= Affair (Big Love) =

- Big Love episode
- Episode no.: Season 1 Episode 5
- Directed by: Alan Taylor
- Story by: Alexa Junge
- Teleplay by: Alexa Junge; Mark V. Olsen; Will Scheffer
- Cinematography by: James Glennon
- Editing by: Carole Kravetz
- Original release date: April 9, 2006
- Running time: 54 minutes

Guest appearance
- Matt Ross as Alby Grant

Episode chronology
← Previous "Eclipse"	Next → "Roberta's Funeral"

"Affair" is the fifth episode of the American drama television series Big Love. The episode was written by co-executive producer Alexa Junge and series creators Mark V. Olsen and Will Scheffer from a story by Junge, and directed by Alan Taylor. It originally aired on HBO on April 9, 2006.

The series is set in Salt Lake City and follows Bill Henrickson, a fundamentalist Mormon. He practices polygamy, having Barbara, Nicki and Margie as his wives. The series charts the family's life in and out of the public sphere in their suburb, as well as their associations with a fundamentalist compound in the area. In the episode, Bill and Barbara decide to have some escapes to a motel, raising Nicki's suspicions that he might have an affair.

According to Nielsen Media Research, the episode was seen by an estimated 4.20 million household viewers. The episode received mostly positive reviews from critics, who praised the performances, although some questioned the characters' decisions.

== Plot ==
After attending a historic preservation event, Bill Henrickson (Bill Paxton) and Barbara (Jeanne Tripplehorn) have sex off the road in their car. This encounter motivates them in seeking a motel to reignite their relationship. Bill's behavior causes Nicki (Chloë Sevigny) to suspect that he might have an affair.

Don (Joel McKinnon Miller) contacts the attorney general's "Polygamy czar", claiming that his mother has been conned by Roman (Harry Dean Stanton) and offers information on Roman to help build a case against him. However, Bill's bookkeeper, Wendy (Jodie Markell), suspects that Don is involved in polygamy. When Bill dismisses her concerns, she confronts Don's wife, Peg (Wendy Phillips), but Peg is not affected by her threat. When Alby (Matt Ross) is unable to find anything incriminating against Bill, he is insulted by Roman and gets into an argument with Rhonda (Daveigh Chase).

Margie (Ginnifer Goodwin) decides to spend more time with Pam (Audrey Wasilewski). She allows her into the house, and lies by claiming that she is a widow. When Barbara and Nicki discover her actions, they scold her for risking their lives as they found errors in her statements. Nicki's suspicions arise when she discovers a hotel soap in her casket, and confides in Barbara that Bill may have an affair. While Bill and Barbara leave for another encounter, Alby shows up at their house to talk to Bill. Nicki makes her brother leave the property, with the latter claiming Bill only married her as a "collateral" for a loan. Having realized that the "affair" was Bill and Barbara, Nicki reunites the family to make an announcement: she wants another baby. Bill happily accepts the news, and while Barbara and Margie are surprised, they also express support for her decision.

== Production ==
=== Development ===
The episode was written by co-executive producer Alexa Junge and series creators Mark V. Olsen and Will Scheffer from a story by Junge, and directed by Alan Taylor. This was Junge's first writing credit, Olsen's fifth writing credit, Scheffer's fifth writing credit, and Taylor's first directing credit.

== Reception ==
=== Viewers ===
In its original American broadcast, "Affair" was seen by an estimated 4.20 million household viewers. This was a 20% increase from the previous episode, which was watched by an estimated 3.50 million household viewers.

=== Critical reviews ===
"Affair" received positive reviews from critics. Michael Peck of TV Guide wrote, "Ah, answered questions. Which wife does Bill love the most? I knew which one he should, of course, but now we see he's got some sense: Barb. It's kind of sweet to see them sneaking off together, ain't it? Provided you're not Nicki or Margene, of course. Then again, "sweet" doesn't apply to Nicki, of course."

Michael Sciannamea of TV Squad wrote, "There were more plot turns in this episode than a ride down San Francisco's Lombard Street, but this seemed to be the best one so far. Bill's fight with Roman is going to get nastier, and all of the attention being paid to polygamy should be coming to a head soon enough." Television Without Pity gave the episode a "B+" grade.
