= Free at Last (Big Love) =

- Big Love episode
- Episode no.: Season 4 Episode 1
- Directed by: Dan Attias
- Written by: Mark V. Olsen; Will Scheffer
- Cinematography by: Anette Haellmigk
- Editing by: Byron Smith
- Original release date: January 10, 2010
- Running time: 54 minutes

Guest appearances
- Bruce Dern as Frank Harlow; Mary Kay Place as Adaleen Grant; Joel McKinnon Miller as Don Embry; Douglas Smith as Ben Henrickson; Adam Beach as Tommy Flute; Anne Dudek as Lura Grant; Charles Esten as Ray Henry; Robert Beltran as Jerry Flute; Ben Koldyke as Dale Tomasson; Katherine LaNasa as Beverly Ford; Wendy Phillips as Peg Embry; Tim Griffin as Ralph

Episode chronology
← Previous "Sacrament"	Next → "The Greater Good"

"Free at Last" is the first episode of the fourth season of the American drama television series Big Love. It is the 35th overall episode of the series and was written by series creators Mark V. Olsen and Will Scheffer, and directed by producer Dan Attias. It originally aired on HBO on January 10, 2010.

The series is set in Salt Lake City and follows Bill Henrickson, a fundamentalist Mormon. He practices polygamy, having Barbara, Nicki and Margie as his wives. The series charts the family's life in and out of the public sphere in their suburb, as well as their associations with a fundamentalist compound in the area. In the episode, Bill prepares for the grand opening of the casino, while authorities look for the whereabouts of Roman Grant.

According to Nielsen Media Research, the episode was seen by an estimated 1.73 million household viewers and gained a 0.8/2 ratings share among adults aged 18–49. The episode received extremely positive reviews from critics, who praised the new storylines and performances.

== Plot ==
Bill (Bill Paxton) has built a church, while getting ready for the grand opening of the Blackfoot Magic Casino. However, Bill and his family are often harassed by the FBI, who raid their houses as they believe they may know the location of Roman, who is reported as missing for the past two months. The FBI is primarily targeting Nicki (Chloë Sevigny), as deposits have been appearing in her bank account on Roman's name.

In Juniper Creek, the FBI is also conducting raids on the Grants. Lois (Grace Zabriskie) has been targeted by Frank (Bruce Dern) for trying to kill him, but she has avoided her attempts. Fed up with him, she offers a percentage of her profits in her parrot smuggling business if she leaves her in peace, which he accepts. Alby (Matt Ross) has a close encounter with Dale Tomasson (Ben Koldyke), the state-appointed trustee of Juniper Creek's assets. When her electricity is cut off, Adaleen (Mary Kay Place) asks Nicki to come and help her get a new generator. She enters her meat locker, and is horrified to discover Roman's corpse. Despite Adaleen's pleas, Nicki tells her to inform the authorities.

Nicki also deals with J.J. (Željko Ivanek) over the custody of Cara Lynn (Cassi Thomson). Eventually, they reach an agreement wherein Cara Lynn can go to school and stay with the Henricksons during weekdays, while staying with J.J. on weekends. However, the grand opening is jeopardized when Roman's body shows up near the area, dropped by Alby. Nicki tries to get rid of the corpse, until she is stopped by Bill. Bill helps her in moving the body back to Alby's house, although this makes them miss the beginning of the grand opening. Despite that, the opening is deemed a success, and Bill forms a prayer circle for himself, Barbara (Jeanne Tripplehorn), Nicki and Margie (Ginnifer Goodwin). Suddenly, Jerry (Robert Beltran) and his son Tommy (Adam Beach) interrupt, revealing that they discovered Roman's hat, asking Bill if this belongs to him.

== Production ==
=== Development ===
The episode was written by series creators Mark V. Olsen and Will Scheffer, and directed by producer Dan Attias. This was Olsen's 18th writing credit, Scheffer's 18th writing credit, and Attias' sixth directing credit.

== Reception ==
=== Viewers ===
In its original American broadcast, "Free at Last" was seen by an estimated 1.73 million household viewers with a 0.8/2 in the 18–49 demographics. This means that 0.8 percent of all households with televisions watched the episode, while 2 percent of all of those watching television at the time of the broadcast watched it. This was a 37% decrease in viewership from the previous episode, which was seen by an estimated 2.73 million household viewers with a 1.3 in the 18–49 demographics.

=== Critical reviews ===
"Free at Last" received positive reviews from critics. Amelie Gillette of The A.V. Club gave the episode a "B" grade and wrote, "Whew. That was an exhausting opener. Sometimes Big Love stretches just a little too far to live up to the "Big" part of its title. How many times do you think they had to send an intern out for more index cards while storyboarding that episode?"

Alan Sepinwall wrote, "I've been pretty clear and consistent about the parts of the show I like (the wives and kids) and the parts I don't care for (Juniper Creek, Bill's businesses)." Nick Catucci of Vulture wrote, "It's a sideshow, to be sure, but if you insist on doing more than simply enjoying it, take it as a wry comment on a show that knows it might just have to go off the tracks. Just don’t ask us to explain why Lois calls her birds “worthless clitorises.”"

Clara Loginov of Slant Magazine wrote, "After watching the beginning of season four of Big Love, I think we can safely give up on ever having a premiere of this show that isn't a busy and exhausting whirlwind." James Poniewozik of TIME wrote, "Bill has elements of both; he has an undeniable work ethic, but central to his belief system is also the idea that he must trust in fate to an extent–that he can take on massive family obligations and God will provide. Big Love, too, takes gambles, trusting that it can risk big and things will fall into place. I've seen this episode and next week’s, and I’m still glad to roll the dice with it."

Allyssa Lee of Los Angeles Times wrote, "At long last, HBO's extended family drama is back: Let's all make like Lura and pop open a contraband can of Coors to celebrate! And this episode, titled “Free At Last,” sure was a doozy. Right off the bat it's clear that this season isn't going to be like the others." TV Fanatic wrote, "It was nice to see Nicki and Bill finally starting to mend their broken relationship. And the scene where Bill has his final moments with Roman spoke volumes. You can see that this man - as much as he hated him, Bill respected him as well." Mark Blankenship of HuffPost wrote, "This week's episode finds every character in some kind of crisis, so the First Wife title goes less to the woman who's got it all together and more to the woman who is the least out of control."
