= Viagra Blue =

- Big Love episode
- Episode no.: Season 1 Episode 2
- Directed by: Charles McDougall
- Written by: Mark V. Olsen; Will Scheffer
- Cinematography by: James Glennon
- Editing by: Carole Kravetz
- Original release date: March 19, 2006
- Running time: 51 minutes

Guest appearances
- Matt Ross as Alby Grant; Tina Majorino as Heather Tuttle

Episode chronology
← Previous "Pilot"	Next → "Home Invasion"

"Viagra Blue" is the second episode of the American drama television series Big Love. The episode was written by series creators Mark V. Olsen and Will Scheffer, and directed by Charles McDougall. It originally aired on HBO on March 19, 2006.

The series is set in Salt Lake City and follows Bill Henrickson, a fundamentalist Mormon. He practices polygamy, having Barbara, Nicki and Margie as his wives. The series charts the family's life in and out of the public sphere in their suburb, as well as their associations with a fundamentalist compound in the area. In the episode, Bill struggles in being present for his wives, while also fearing that Roman could go after him.

According to Nielsen Media Research, the episode was seen by an estimated 3.40 million household viewers. The episode received positive reviews from critics, who expressed interest in its themes and characters.

== Plot ==
Barbara (Jeanne Tripplehorn) is upset when Margie (Ginnifer Goodwin) having sex with Bill Henrickson (Bill Paxton) cuts into her day. Nicki (Chloë Sevigny) decides to talk with Bill over it, and ends up having sex with him, which is accidentally seen by Margie. Bill ignores Margie's concerns, as he is worried over installing a home security system after feeling threatened by Roman (Harry Dean Stanton).

Sarah (Amanda Seyfried) continues hanging out with Heather Tuttle (Tina Majorino) at her job. Heather makes it clear that she knows about her family's polygamy, but that she still wants to be her friend despite disapproving of the concept. Sarah is annoyed by her remark, although she also says she does not like polygamy. Roman visits Frank (Bruce Dern) at the hospital, warning him that Bill is not welcome back at Juniper Creek. Bill decides to visit Frank, and forces him to leave the hospital and bring him home. On their way to the compound, they are cornered by Roman's son, Alby (Matt Ross). Frank is forced to walk the rest of the road home, while Bill returns to Salt Lake City, praying to God for protection.

Bill visits Margie, apologizing for his actions and not always being for her, telling her she is very important to the family. Later, Lois (Grace Zabriskie) angrily calls Bill, as he warned Frank that she might have been involved in his poisoning. Before leaving to meet with Nicki, Bill takes Viagra before entering her house.

== Production ==
=== Development ===
The episode was written by series creators Mark V. Olsen and Will Scheffer, and directed by Charles McDougall. This was Olsen's second writing credit, Scheffer's second writing credit, and McDougall's first directing credit.

== Reception ==
=== Viewers ===
In its original American broadcast, "Viagra Blue" was seen by an estimated 3.40 million household viewers. This was a 26% decrease from the previous episode, which was watched by an estimated 4.56 million household viewers with a 2.2/5 in the 18–49 demographics.

=== Critical reviews ===
"Viagra Blue" received positive reviews from critics. Michael Peck of TV Guide wrote, "So apparently the morals crowd worries about this show, fearing that if we remove even one ounce of taboo from the notion of polygamy, it'll become acceptable, and then we're all on our way to Sinville together. Obviously, they haven't actually watched. Is anyone taking in Viagra-popping Bill's plight of a life and thinking, "Oh, gimme some of that?" Wives battling over whose day it is, who gets what and who's getting more."

Alan Sepinwall wrote, "I've seen the first two, and I'm weirded out by it in a way that I've never been by The Sopranos or Six Feet or Deadwood. I can relate to sociopathic mobsters and emotionally-repressed morticians, you know, but this polygamy culture is so alien to me (not just the three wives thing, but the lack of swearing and the general primness of everyone) that I have trouble relating. It's well done enough that I'll probably give it a few more shots, but I don't want to feel this uncomfortable when I'm watching TV."

Michael Sciannamea of TV Squad wrote, "I realize the show is still finding its sea legs, but it all seems too disjointed. Maybe because we viewers are trying to make sense of how this family situation is deemed normal by those who are in it that we find it so weird. In any case, I think after an extremely fragmented first episode, this one seemed a bit more streamlined (if you can believe that) and there are a few storylines that bear watching." Television Without Pity gave the episode a "B+" grade.
