= Pilot (Big Love) =

- Big Love episode
- Episode no.: Season 1 Episode 1
- Directed by: Rodrigo García
- Written by: Mark V. Olsen; Will Scheffer
- Cinematography by: Xavier Pérez Grobet; James Glennon
- Editing by: Elizabeth Kling; Leo Trombetta; Tanya Swerling
- Original release date: March 12, 2006
- Running time: 57 minutes

Guest appearances
- Mary Kay Place as Adaleen Grant; Matt Ross as Alby Grant; Tina Majorino as Heather Tuttle

Episode chronology
← Previous —	Next → "Viagra Blue"

"Pilot" is the series premiere of the American drama television series Big Love. The episode was written by series creators Mark V. Olsen and Will Scheffer, and directed by Rodrigo García. It originally aired on HBO on March 12, 2006.

The series is set in Salt Lake City and follows Bill Henrickson, a fundamentalist Mormon. He practices polygamy, having Barbara, Nicki and Margie as his wives. The series charts the family's life in and out of the public sphere in their suburb, as well as their associations with a fundamentalist compound in the area.

According to Nielsen Media Research, the episode was seen by an estimated 4.56 million household viewers and gained a 2.2/5 ratings share among adults aged 18–49. The episode received positive reviews from critics, who praised the performances and writing as highlights. For the episode, García received a nomination for Outstanding Directing for a Drama Series at the 58th Primetime Emmy Awards.

== Plot ==
In Salt Lake City, Bill Henrickson (Bill Paxton), a fundamentalist Mormon, lives in a suburb with his three wives, Barbara (Jeanne Tripplehorn), Nicki (Chloë Sevigny) and Margie (Ginnifer Goodwin), staying with a different wife each day. Bill is the successful owner of a hardware superstore, and he is already in the process of opening a second location. Despite their quiet and peaceful life, Bill's wives have their struggles; Barbara is returning to teaching and asks for his help, Nicki needs money and Margie struggles in raising her two children.

The pressure of his second superstore and the needs of his wives cause Bill to suffer erectile dysfunction. One day he is called by his brother, Joey (Shawn Doyle), a former football star. Joey states that their father, Frank (Bruce Dern), is extremely sick. Bill is forced to visit the Juniper Creek compound to visit his father, bringing along a reluctant Nicki and Barbara. They reunite with Bill's mother, Lois (Grace Zabriskie). Bill is shocked to find his father lying on the floor, and secretly gets him into a hospital, despite Lois not wanting to visit hospitals as she fears they might uncover their activities.

Sarah (Amanda Seyfried), the daughter of Bill and Barbara, works at a fast food restaurant. During a shift, she befriends a new employee, Heather Tuttle (Tina Majorino), whose father works in the police force. Back at the compound, Lois discovers that Bill checked Frank into a hospital and angrily tries to take him out, but Bill makes her let Frank rest, as he has been diagnosed to have arsenic in his body. Barbara meets Roman Grant (Harry Dean Stanton), the leader of the compound and Nicki's father. However, Barbara is disgusted by Roman, as he is planning to marry a teenager named Rhonda Volmer (Daveigh Chase).

Bill, Barbara and Nicki return to Salt Lake City, having left Margie to babysit all their children. Margie breaks down while talking to Barbara, feeling that she is unable to keep up and help their families. Barbara, joined by Nicki, console her, telling her they are helping themselves in everything. Bill inaugurates the second superstore, with his wives in attendance. However, he is approached by Roman over sharing profits from the second superstore, which Bill refuses. As he joins Barbara to sleep, Bill wonders if Lois is responsible for his father's condition.

== Production ==
=== Development ===
The episode was written by series creators Mark V. Olsen and Will Scheffer, and directed by Rodrigo García.

== Reception ==
=== Viewers ===
In its original American broadcast, "Pilot" was seen by an estimated 4.56 million household viewers with a 2.2/5 in the 18–49 demographics. This means that 2.2 percent of all households with televisions watched the episode, while 5 percent of all of those watching television at the time of the broadcast watched it.

=== Critical reviews ===
"Pilot" received a positive response from critics. Michael Peck of TV Guide wrote, "I've come to realize that as much as I worry that I watch too much TV to feel adequately optimistic about the medium, I still turn on a new HBO show hoping they've scored another Sopranos or Deadwood and not just an Arliss. Never mind that I want to see Bill Paxton in something good. I have a soft spot for the guy, since pretty much every male of a certain age can, like myself, recite line after line of him as Chet in Weird Science, and as "Game over!" space Marine Hudson in Aliens. And that's not even mentioning other great stuff like One False Move and A Simple Plan. The short version: I'm primed to like this."

Michael Sciannamea of TV Squad wrote, "I wasn't quite sure what to make of Big Love. The acting was good and the dialogue was snappy and to the point. However, I felt incredibly weird after watching it, sort of the same way I felt after watching The Book of Daniel when it was on NBC. Are the writers and producers trying to shock the audience first and somehow develop a story around it?" Television Without Pity gave the episode a "B+" grade.

Maureen Ryan of Chicago Tribune wrote, "Did someone mention Lost? Well, it's a stretch, but one can find parallels between Big Love and that ABC series. You could argue that both serialized, slow-building dramas are about how one defines, and constructs, a family. There are fewer adventures on Big Love, but almost as many confused folks in search of salvation." Lynn Neary of NPR wrote, "Mark Olsen and Will Scheffer, the show's co-creators, say they are not trying to push an agenda with Big Love. They just think of it as a show about what it means to be a family."

=== Accolades ===
For the episode, García received a nomination for Outstanding Directing for a Drama Series at the 58th Primetime Emmy Awards. He would lose to Jon Cassar, who won for directing the episode "Day 5: 7:00 a.m. – 8:00 a.m." for 24.
