= Easter (Big Love) =

- Big Love episode
- Episode no.: Season 1 Episode 8
- Directed by: Steve Shill
- Written by: Mark V. Olsen; Will Scheffer
- Cinematography by: Russ Alsobrook
- Editing by: Carole Kravetz
- Original release date: April 30, 2006
- Running time: 51 minutes

Guest appearance
- Mary Kay Place as Adaleen Grant

Episode chronology
← Previous "Eviction"	Next → "A Barbecue for Betty"

"Easter" is the eighth episode of the American drama television series Big Love. The episode was written by series creators Mark V. Olsen and Will Scheffer, and directed by Steve Shill. It originally aired on HBO on April 30, 2006.

The series is set in Salt Lake City and follows Bill Henrickson, a fundamentalist Mormon. He practices polygamy, having Barbara, Nicki and Margie as his wives. The series charts the family's life in and out of the public sphere in their suburb, as well as their associations with a fundamentalist compound in the area. In the episode, Bill struggles with his family moving in with him after their eviction, while also building a case against Roman.

According to Nielsen Media Research, the episode was seen by an estimated 4.03 million household viewers. The episode received positive reviews from critics, who praised the dinner scene and character development.

== Plot ==
After their eviction, Lois (Grace Zabriskie) and Joey (Shawn Doyle) have moved in with Bill Henrickson (Bill Paxton), along with their families. Frank (Bruce Dern) is also moving in, but he is only allowed to be in the house to eat and shower, with Bill forcing him to sleep in his truck. Bill is building a case against Roman (Harry Dean Stanton), although his lawyer indicates that Roman is willing to settle.

Bill is questioned by Wendy (Jodie Markell) over Alby breaking in the office, as some employees are alarmed that their records would be stolen. When he feels sick, he gets Margie (Ginnifer Goodwin) to take him to the doctor, but he is not diagnosed with anything. However, the doctor notes that Bill has been using Viagra and tells him to stop. He is surprised when Roman decides to send many countersuits, which could also implicate Lois for assaulting one of Roman's employees. Nicki (Chloë Sevigny) contacts Adaleen (Mary Kay Place) to help her debt, only to find that her mother is also indebted. Sarah (Amanda Seyfried) helps Lois in taking a bath, and she decides to cut her hair when she explains her background.

During an Easter dinner, Frank insults Lois' new haircut, and this escalates into more accusations across the family. Joey's wife, Wanda (Melora Walters), storms out and expresses her concerns to Joey that they might move back with his family. As Bill and Joey leave to meet with Roman, Frank calls Roman to warn him that Bill has so much to lose. When Roman does not show up to the meeting, Bill decides to confront him at his house, where he is attacked by his wives until he finally reaches his bedroom. He tells him he will give him 15% of the second store's profits off the books and get his parents back on Juniper Creek, threatening to destroy his prized guitar if he refuses. Bill returns home to tell her mother, only to find that she invited Frank into her bedroom. Bill goes to his bedroom, where he is consoled by Barbara (Jeanne Tripplehorn).

== Production ==
=== Development ===
The episode was written by series creators Mark V. Olsen and Will Scheffer, and directed by Steve Shill. This was Olsen's sixth writing credit, Scheffer's sixth writing credit, and Shill's first directing credit.

== Reception ==
=== Viewers ===
In its original American broadcast, "Easter" was seen by an estimated 4.03 million household viewers. This was a 5% decrease from the previous episode, which was watched by an estimated 4.24 million household viewers.

=== Critical reviews ===
"Easter" received positive reviews from critics. Michael Peck of TV Guide wrote, "Good stuff this week, huh? First off, I couldn't help but be entertained by Bill waking up to a face-licking from his unwanted guests' dog and then knocking the wee pooch off the bed. I used to have a dog, and when you do you either don't mind it licking your face at all, or you can't forget the other things you've seen it do with that mouth and you freak out as much or more than Bill did. When it's not your dog? All bets are off."

Michael Sciannamea of TV Squad wrote, "the signs of Bill and Roman's "battle" all point to a violent confrontation, and the fact that Frank was discovered to be doing Roman's dirty work and spying on Bill makes it even more creepy. All in all, the moral of this story seemed to be that if you invite family over to stay for a while, you will live (or die) with the consequences." Television Without Pity gave the episode a "B+" grade.
