= Eclipse (Big Love) =

- Big Love episode
- Episode no.: Season 1 Episode 4
- Directed by: Michael Spiller
- Story by: David Manson
- Teleplay by: David Manson; Mark V. Olsen; Will Scheffer
- Cinematography by: Russ Alsobrook
- Editing by: Amy E. Duddleston
- Original release date: April 2, 2006
- Running time: 55 minutes

Guest appearance
- Tina Majorino as Heather Tuttle

Episode chronology
← Previous "Home Invasion"	Next → "Affair"

"Eclipse" is the fourth episode of the American drama television series Big Love. The episode was written by consulting producer David Manson and series creators Mark V. Olsen and Will Scheffer from a story by Manson, and directed by Michael Spiller. It originally aired on HBO on April 2, 2006.

The series is set in Salt Lake City and follows Bill Henrickson, a fundamentalist Mormon. He practices polygamy, having Barbara, Nicki and Margie as his wives. The series charts the family's life in and out of the public sphere in their suburb, as well as their associations with a fundamentalist compound in the area. In the episode, Bill is haunted by recurring dreams but finds a solution while he goes hunting, while his wives face different challenges.

According to Nielsen Media Research, the episode was seen by an estimated 3.50 million household viewers. The episode received positive reviews from critics, who praised its writing and character development.

== Plot ==
Bill Henrickson (Bill Paxton) starts experiencing weird dreams, wherein he is haunted by an unseen force. Later, he is visited at his Home Plus store by a representative of Juniper Creek's United Effort Brotherhood, warning him that he plans to audit him. Don (Joel McKinnon Miller) is scared that Roman (Harry Dean Stanton) could ruin their lives, but Bill remains calmed over the situation.

Nicki (Chloë Sevigny) goes on a shopping spree, alerting her credit card companies. She is then entrusted by Barbara (Jeanne Tripplehorn) to watch her kids when Barbara has to work. She in turn decides to pass the task to Margie (Ginnifer Goodwin) as she deals with the companies. Margie is unable to keep up with the kids, and ruins Barbara's daughter Tancy's beauty pageant. Nicki meets up with Roman, who was informed of her credit card. He offers to pay half her debts if she can provide some information about Bill's store, although Nicki claims he never discusses it with her.

After talking with Heather (Tina Majorino), Sarah (Amanda Seyfried) asks Barbara about her family's polygamy's history. Barbara reveals that Roman took ownership of Juniper Creek after kicking the other owner out, and is responsible for Bill's family's poverty. Later, Sarah decides to leave with her friend Donna (Lyndsy Fonseca) to a party, although Heather refuses to accompany her. As Donna makes out with a boy (Ricky Ullman), Sarah gets intoxicated and falls into the grass. To her surprise, Heather shows up and takes her home.

Nicki discovers that her debts now exceed $60,000, and gets into a heated argument with Margie and Barbara over their roles in their lives. Bill takes Ben (Douglas Smith) on a hunting trip with Don and his son. As they finish their trip, a lone wolf approaches them. When the wolf is getting closer to Ben, Bill shoots him. Back home, Bill finds relief after finally facing his own dream, deciding that he needs to fight back against Roman.

== Production ==
=== Development ===
The episode was written by consulting producer David Manson and series creators Mark V. Olsen and Will Scheffer from a story by Manson, and directed by Michael Spiller. This was Manson's first writing credit, Olsen's fourth writing credit, Scheffer's fourth writing credit, and Spiller's first directing credit.

== Reception ==
=== Viewers ===
In its original American broadcast, "Eclipse" was seen by an estimated 3.50 million household viewers. This was a 6% decrease from the previous episode, which was watched by an estimated 3.70 million household viewers.

=== Critical reviews ===
"Eclipse" received positive reviews from critics. Michael Peck of TV Guide wrote, "Ever wonder if we're ever going to get a chance to see Nicki's good side? Keep wondering, then, since we're sure not seeing it this week. Nothing like a shopaholic wife who runs up your bills, ignores collection-agency calls, mistreats your other wives and goes to her evil dad for help, thus exposing you to even more downside. Her one mitigating move for the night is helping Ben with his embarrassing-sheets problem, but I'm betting she'll use that knowledge to some bad end, too."

Michael Sciannamea of TV Squad wrote, "Barb is the most logical and well-grounded of the three wives, and her acceptance of a long-term teaching gig is not sitting well with Nicki and Margene who, as we've seen already, are not exactly the most responsible of people. It's obvious they fear the "Boss Lady" will wield more power over them because she'll be bringing more money into the general pot and is bound to get more of Bill's attention." Television Without Pity gave the episode a "B+" grade.
