= A Barbecue for Betty =

- Big Love episode
- Episode no.: Season 1 Episode 9
- Directed by: Julian Farino
- Story by: Jill Sprecher; Karen Sprecher
- Teleplay by: Jill Sprecher; Mark V. Olsen; Will Scheffer
- Cinematography by: James Glennon
- Editing by: Carole Kravetz; Amy E. Duddleston
- Original release date: May 7, 2006
- Running time: 50 minutes

Guest appearance
- Tina Majorino as Heather Tuttle

Episode chronology
← Previous "Easter"	Next → "The Baptism"

"A Barbecue for Betty" is the ninth episode of the American drama television series Big Love. The episode was written by producer Jill Sprecher and series creators Mark V. Olsen and Will Scheffer from a story by Sprecher and Karen Sprecher, and directed by Julian Farino. It originally aired on HBO on May 7, 2006.

The series is set in Salt Lake City and follows Bill Henrickson, a fundamentalist Mormon. He practices polygamy, having Barbara, Nicki and Margie as his wives. The series charts the family's life in and out of the public sphere in their suburb, as well as their associations with a fundamentalist compound in the area. In the episode, Bill throws a barbecue to celebrate Don's new marriage, but his plans are jeopardized when he learns about Nicki's debts.

According to Nielsen Media Research, the episode was seen by an estimated 4.04 million household viewers. The episode received mostly positive reviews from critics, who praised the conflicts and character development.

== Plot ==
Bill Henrickson (Bill Paxton) and Roman (Harry Dean Stanton) conclude their settlement, and Bill returns Roman's prized guitar as part of the agreement. To celebrate, Bill decides to throw a barbecue for his family, also inviting Don (Joel McKinnon Miller) to celebrate his fourth marriage to a woman named Betty.

After having sex, Nicki (Chloë Sevigny) tells Bill about her credit card debt, and he is angered upon learning she had Roman cover some of the expenses. When he talks with Barbara (Jeanne Tripplehorn) over the problem, Bill is annoyed when Barbara reveals she already knew of her debt. Margie (Ginnifer Goodwin) is surprised when Ben (Douglas Smith) reveals that when Bill wanted to marry her, either Nicki or Barbara opposed to her marriage. Bill and Margie also meet Heather's father, Chuck, and are alarmed when they find that he is a State Trooper. Bill scolds Sarah (Amanda Seyfried) for not telling him about her family.

Margie is tricked by her neighbors into going into a blind date with a man named Chad. While they enjoy a good evening, Margie wants the encounter to stay as a one-off. However, he later shows up at her house and asks for a kiss. Margie gently turns him down by saying she is seeing someone else, and Chad suggests she should not follow that path. At the barbecue, Don reveals that Betty's past was investigated and that his wives are reconsidering his new marriage, so Margie visits Betty to tell her to go forward with the wedding anyway. But the weight of the wives prove too much for Don, who decides not to go forward.

Roman unexpectedly shows up at Home Plus, just as a thunderstorm puts a hole in the store's ceiling, to deliver the files that Alby retrieved. Later, Bill and Don are notified that their plans to build a third store are in jeopardy, as the land is possibly an ancient burial ground and may be in litigation for years. When Barbara reports that Nicki is missing, Bill finds her in a mall applying for a new job. Seeing her struggle, Bill finally forgives her and invites her back in the house. Nicki accepts, and also reveals that Frank didn't kick him out of Juniper Creek, it was Roman himself after he feared that Bill could replace him as the Prophet. When she returns home, she comes clean to Margie by revealing she voted against her as she was scared that she would be overshadowed. Although hurt, Margie forgives her.

== Production ==
=== Development ===
The episode was written by producer Jill Sprecher and series creators Mark V. Olsen and Will Scheffer from a story by Sprecher and Karen Sprecher, and directed by Julian Farino. This was the Sprechers' first writing credits, Olsen's seventh writing credit, Scheffer's seventh writing credit, and Farino's first directing credit.

== Reception ==
=== Viewers ===
In its original American broadcast, "A Barbecue for Betty" was seen by an estimated 4.04 million household viewers. This was a slight increase in viewership from the previous episode, which was watched by an estimated 4.03 million household viewers.

=== Critical reviews ===
"A Barbecue for Betty" received mostly positive reviews from critics. Michael Peck of TV Guide wrote, "I'm having a hard time expressing how much I hate Nicki, and I bet I'm not alone. I almost started to feel a little sorry for her after she told Bill about her nearly 60 large in credit-card debt, and even after she told him she's allowed Roman to make payments on some of it. Never mind that when Barb, whom I love, started pushing for clemency, I was nearly thinking Nicki is human."

Michael Sciannamea of TV Squad wrote, "It seems that Bill is losing control, and to top it off, he can't even throw out the garbage in his own store's garbage dump and eventually leaves it at the ill-fated store site. Even after he reassures Nicki that things will be OK after she runs away for a night, things are not going in the right direction for Bill. Plus, we only saw Roman Grant for only a couple of fleeting moments, and suffice to say his battle with Bill is not over by a long shot." Television Without Pity gave the episode a "B+" grade.
