= Home Invasion (Big Love) =

- Big Love episode
- Episode no.: Season 1 Episode 3
- Directed by: Charles McDougall
- Written by: Mark V. Olsen; Will Scheffer
- Cinematography by: James Glennon
- Editing by: Leo Trombetta; Tanya Swerling
- Original release date: March 26, 2006
- Running time: 48 minutes

Guest appearances
- Mary Kay Place as Adaleen Grant; Matt Ross as Alby Grant

Episode chronology
← Previous "Viagra Blue"	Next → "Eclipse"

"Home Invasion" is the third episode of the American drama television series Big Love. The episode was written by series creators Mark V. Olsen and Will Scheffer, and directed by Charles McDougall. It originally aired on HBO on March 26, 2006.

The series is set in Salt Lake City and follows Bill Henrickson, a fundamentalist Mormon. He practices polygamy, having Barbara, Nicki and Margie as his wives. The series charts the family's life in and out of the public sphere in their suburb, as well as their associations with a fundamentalist compound in the area. In the episode, Bill decides to install a home security system, while Nicki prepares a birthday party for his son Wayne.

According to Nielsen Media Research, the episode was seen by an estimated 3.70 million household viewers. The episode received mostly positive reviews from critics, who praised the character development and performances.

== Plot ==
Bill Henrickson (Bill Paxton) surprises Margie (Ginnifer Goodwin) by giving her a brand new car, and she happily decides to take Ben (Douglas Smith) on a joyride, worrying Barbara (Jeanne Tripplehorn). Bill also announces that he is installing a home security system, although he does not reveal that Roman (Harry Dean Stanton) is the problem.

Nicki (Chloë Sevigny) starts planning her son Wayne's birthday party. She wants a big venue with up to 200 guests, but Bill forbids her from drawing attention to them, forcing her to relocate it to their backyard. Despite installing the home security system, Bill and his colleagues at Home Plus are targeted by Roman's henchmen. His associate, Don Embry (Joel McKinnon Miller), is concerned that the company could expose their polygamy, but Bill dismisses it. Roman, meanwhile, participates in an interview to offer his support towards polygamy, hoping that the Supreme Court will eventually legalize it. However, he draws negative attention when he compares the struggle of accepting polygamy to the struggle of homosexuality. Noticing her new neighbors, Carl (Carlos Jacott) and Pam Martin (Audrey Wasilewski), Barbara decides to establish a friendly relationship with them.

At the birthday party, Lois (Grace Zabriskie) angrily tells Bill that Frank (Bruce Dern) has been very defensive at their home, causing a strain in their marriage. When Roman suddenly arrives, Bill scolds Nicki for inviting him, telling her he is the reason behind the security system. Tensions arise during the party when Lois meets Margie and criticizes Bill for marrying a young woman. This makes Margie defend herself, explaining that she started as a babysitter but that she found happiness with Bill. When Nicki presents Wayne with his gifts, she is scolded by her mother Adaleen (Mary Kay Place) for her materialism, causing her to leave the party humiliated.

Frank unexpectedly arrives at the party, and he gets into an argument with Lois over his poisoning. She finally admits that she is angered because he killed their dog, with Frank justifying the act. Bill finds Nicki laughing with Roman, and after she leaves, Roman warns Bill that he cannot escape him. After the party ends, Bill consoles Nicki, who feels she does not belong in the family. They are interrupted when the home security system alerts them, finding that Wayne's new pony activated it.

== Production ==
=== Development ===
The episode was written by series creators Mark V. Olsen and Will Scheffer, and directed by Charles McDougall. This was Olsen's third writing credit, Scheffer's third writing credit, and McDougall's second directing credit.

== Reception ==
=== Viewers ===
In its original American broadcast, "Home Invasion" was seen by an estimated 3.70 million household viewers. This was an 8% increase from the previous episode, which was watched by an estimated 3.40 million household viewers.

=== Critical reviews ===
"Home Invasion" received mostly positive reviews from critics. Michael Peck of TV Guide wrote, "There comes a point in every new series, one hopes, where it moves from showing potential to actually getting interesting, when you click over from merely being intrigued to feeling something (good or bad) for the characters. I think Big Love hit that mark this week, as we began to see these people fleshed out."

Michael Sciannamea of TV Squad wrote, "Although Big Love is definitely uncoventional viewing, it still is compelling. I can't conceive of any of this story being remotely real, but I can't bring myself to look away, either." Television Without Pity gave the episode a "B+" grade.
