= Home Invasion (disambiguation) =

A home invasion is an illegal and usually forceful entry to an occupied, private dwelling with violent intent to commit a crime against the occupants. It may also refer to:

- Home Invasion (album), fifth solo album by the artist Ice-T
- "Home Invasion" (American Horror Story): second episode of the first season of the television series American Horror Story
- "Home Invasion" (Arrow): twentieth episode of the first season of the television series Arrow
- Home Invasion (Big Love), an episode of the American TV series Big Love
- "Home Invasion" (TMNT Fast Forward), an episode from the television series Teenage Mutant Ninja Turtles
- "Home Invasion" (White Collar episode) an episode from the first season of the television series White Collar
- Home Invasion, a 2012 TV film, starring Haylie Duff and C. Thomas Howell
- Home Invasion (film), a 2016 film
- "Home Invasion" song by horrorcore artist Violent J
