= Eviction (Big Love) =

- Big Love episode
- Episode no.: Season 1 Episode 7
- Directed by: Michael Spiller
- Written by: Mimi Friedman; Jeanette Collins
- Cinematography by: James Glennon
- Editing by: Tanya Swerling
- Original release date: April 23, 2006
- Running time: 53 minutes

Guest appearances
- Matt Ross as Alby Grant; Tina Majorino as Heather Tuttle

Episode chronology
← Previous "Roberta's Funeral"	Next → "Easter"

"Eviction" is the seventh episode of the American drama television series Big Love. The episode was written by supervising producers Mimi Friedman and Jeanette Collins, and directed by Michael Spiller. It originally aired on HBO on April 23, 2006.

The series is set in Salt Lake City and follows Bill Henrickson, a fundamentalist Mormon. He practices polygamy, having Barbara, Nicki and Margie as his wives. The series charts the family's life in and out of the public sphere in their suburb, as well as their associations with a fundamentalist compound in the area. In the episode, Bill finds that Roman is targeting his family, while Nicki confides her secret to Barbara.

According to Nielsen Media Research, the episode was seen by an estimated 4.24 million household viewers. The episode received positive reviews from critics, who praised the writing and plot progression.

== Plot ==
Bill Henrickson (Bill Paxton) starts working on a new ad for Home Plus, hoping to expand its reach within the city. Don (Joel McKinnon Miller) is skeptical of the budget, and fears that their ties to Roman (Harry Dean Stanton) could jeopardize their business, but Bill is certain that Roman will cut ties with them very shortly.

Roman tells Alby (Matt Ross) that he will stop pursuing Bill, and assigns him a new mission. He stops at a store, where he convinces a stranger to accompany him to his motel. When the man suggests having sex, Alby panics, and his behavior prompts the stranger to flee the motel. Two Mormon missionaries visit Nicki (Chloë Sevigny). When she reprimands them, they quickly deduce she practices polygamy. The missionaries eventually leave, claiming they will pray for her salvation. Ben (Douglas Smith) gets involved in a car accident with his friends, traumatizing him. Sarah (Amanda Seyfried) decides to bring Heather (Tina Majorino) to dine with her family, but Bill and Barbara (Jeanne Tripplehorn) are taken aback when she brings up the concept of polygamy.

Barbara is called by Peg (Wendy Phillips), who informs her of Nicki's credit card debt after the Home Plus incident. When she confronts her, Nicki breaks down, lamenting that Bill might leave her when he finds out. Bill visits Juniper Creek, discovering that the United Effort Brotherhood has evicted Lois (Grace Zabriskie) and Frank (Bruce Dern) from their house, and destroyed family properties. He also discovers that Joey (Shawn Doyle) is being targeted by the Attorney General after Roman provided incriminating evidence. He is later called by a Home Plus security guard, who caught Alby breaking into his office. Bill is forced to let him go. Back home, he expresses his concerns to Barbara.

== Production ==
=== Development ===
The episode was written by supervising producers Mimi Friedman and Jeanette Collins, and directed by Michael Spiller. This was Friedman's first writing credit, Collins' first writing credit, and Spiller's second directing credit.

== Reception ==
=== Viewers ===
In its original American broadcast, "Eviction" was seen by an estimated 4.24 million household viewers. This was a 7% increase from the previous episode, which was watched by an estimated 3.94 million household viewers.

=== Critical reviews ===
"Eviction" received positive reviews from critics. Michael Peck of TV Guide wrote, "OK, here's a lesson in winning friends and influencing people. Or, more accurately, how to win sympathy from the audience. On the one hand, we have dutiful Margene, who minds the kids and, as sweetly as possible, tries to get Bill to take her to the big movie theater or someone to go to the mall with her. No scheming, just asking. And you've gotta feel for the poor kid, who naively signed on for this polygamy deal without realizing what she was getting into, but she's doing the best she can."

Michael Sciannamea of TV Squad wrote, "it's obvious that Bill and Barb share a deep affection for each other. It makes you question as to why Bill is even involved with Nikki and Margene. He doesn't even seem to have any relationships with his children by his two younger wives. Is he a polygamist solely because his father is one and doesn't know any other way of life? Bill is having a tough go of it lately, but he's brought a lot of it upon himself, so let's not shed any tears for him." Television Without Pity gave the episode an "A–" grade.
