= Roberta's Funeral =

- Big Love episode
- Episode no.: Season 1 Episode 6
- Directed by: Mary Harron
- Written by: Eileen Myers
- Cinematography by: Russ Alsobrook
- Editing by: Amy E. Duddleston
- Original release date: April 16, 2006
- Running time: 50 minutes

Guest appearance
- Mary Kay Place as Aladeen Grant

Episode chronology
← Previous "Affair"	Next → "Eviction"

"Roberta's Funeral" is the sixth episode of the American drama television series Big Love. The episode was written by Eileen Myers, and directed by Mary Harron. It originally aired on HBO on April 16, 2006.

The series is set in Salt Lake City and follows Bill Henrickson, a fundamentalist Mormon. He practices polygamy, having Barbara, Nicki and Margie as his wives. The series charts the family's life in and out of the public sphere in their suburb, as well as their associations with a fundamentalist compound in the area. In the episode, Bill accompanies Frank in arranging the funeral for his first wife, while Nicki faces problems while visiting Home Plus.

According to Nielsen Media Research, the episode was seen by an estimated 3.94 million household viewers. The episode received mostly positive reviews from critics, who praised the performances and pacing.

== Plot ==
Bill Henrickson (Bill Paxton) and Nicki (Chloë Sevigny) try to conceive a baby, with Barbara (Jeanne Tripplehorn) even suggesting schedules to form a possible pregnancy. Unbeknownst to Barbara, Nicki takes birth control pills. Meanwhile, Lois (Grace Zabriskie) confronts Frank (Bruce Dern) after the death of his first wife, Roberta, demanding to legally become his wife.

Before sending incriminating evidence to the Attorney General, Bill decides to meet with Roman (Harry Dean Stanton) in Juniper Creek. When Roman is unavailable, he visits Lois and she expresses her conflict with Frank. Bill decides to help Frank and Joey (Shawn Doyle) in finding a casket. Ben (Douglas Smith) is entrusted by Bill to watch over his wives, and becomes paranoid when Margie (Ginnifer Goodwin) invites Pam (Audrey Wasilewski) to watch a movie at her house. He chastises her for risking their secret life, but understands her frustration with feeling alone.

Bill meets with Roman, offering a $50,000 settlement to prevent any further contact, but Roman refuses to his terms. Bill once again threatens him with incriminating evidence, also warning him to stay away from his house. At the funeral, Frank humiliates Lois during his eulogy, angering Bill. Bill offers him $5,000 if he agrees to an official marriage, which Frank reluctantly accepts. This delights Lois, although Bill is taken aback when she says Frank will not be around them for long. After a conflict at the Home Plus store, Nicki finally expresses her frustrations with Barbara, and the latter says she supports everything she did. That night, Bill converses with Ben over his desire to finally engage into polygamy, suggesting he is a good man with a possible future.

== Production ==
=== Development ===
The episode was written by Eileen Myers, and directed by Mary Harron. This was Myers' first writing credit, and Harron's first directing credit.

== Reception ==
=== Viewers ===
In its original American broadcast, "Roberta's Funeral" was seen by an estimated 3.94 million household viewers. This was a 7% decrease from the previous episode, which was watched by an estimated 4.20 million household viewers.

=== Critical reviews ===
"Roberta's Funeral" received positive reviews from critics. Michael Peck of TV Guide wrote, "Yup, I still hate Nicki. I wonder what's gonna happen with Lois, who said Frank won't be around much longer, and I wonder, too, what's gonna happen once Bill realizes he was more prescient than he knew when he said Ben has a big heart and they need to keep an eye on it. Oh, yes, they do at that."

Michael Sciannamea of TV Squad wrote, "The next few weeks should see some situations hitting a critical mass. It doesn't look like Margene and Nicki can keep things quiet for too much longer, and Bill and Roman are heading toward some sort of violent clash. If "another soul" were to be brought into this family, that kid may want to run away screaming as soon as it is able to." Television Without Pity gave the episode a "B" grade.
