= The Baptism =

- Big Love episode
- Episode no.: Season 1 Episode 10
- Directed by: Michael Lehmann
- Written by: Dustin Lance Black
- Cinematography by: Russ Alsobrook
- Editing by: Tanya Swerling
- Original release date: May 14, 2006
- Running time: 52 minutes

Guest appearances
- Mary Kay Place as Adaleen Grant; Matt Ross as Alby Grant

Episode chronology
| ← Previous "A Barbecue for Betty" | Next → "Where There's a Will" |

"The Baptism" is the tenth episode of the American drama television series Big Love. The episode was written by Dustin Lance Black, and directed by Michael Lehmann. It originally aired on HBO on May 14, 2006.

The series is set in Salt Lake City and follows Bill Henrickson, a fundamentalist Mormon. He practices polygamy, having Barbara, Nicki and Margie as his wives. The series charts the family's life in and out of the public sphere in their suburb, as well as their associations with a fundamentalist compound in the area. In the episode, Bill tries to find someone who can support his fight against Roman, while Margie decides to take a huge step in her life.

According to Nielsen Media Research, the episode was seen by an estimated 3.80 million household viewers. The episode received positive reviews from critics, with particular praise towards Ginnifer Goodwin's performance.

== Plot ==
Lois (Grace Zabriskie) gets Bill Henrickson (Bill Paxton) to take her back to Juniper Creek to help Wanda (Melora Walters) during her baby's birth. With Bill gone, Barbara (Jeanne Tripplehorn) is visited by her sister Cindy (Judith Hoag), who wants her to reunite with her mother. Despite hesitating, she decides that meeting her mother would be beneficial for their families.

Ben (Douglas Smith) is pressured by his girlfriend Brynn (Sarah Jones) into losing their virginity. To avoid losing her, he reluctantly agrees to have sex with her. While preparing the clothes for Teenie's baptism, Margie (Ginnifer Goodwin) is told by Pam (Audrey Wasilewski) that she suspects Nicki (Chloë Sevigny) is practicing polygamy. As she prepares Teenie, Margie shows her that she is secretly smoking. Discovering this, Nicki scolds Margie for her carelessness. Nicki also decides to kick her sister out of the house when she starts questioning how she chooses to raise her children, as well as taking her name off her will.

At Juniper Creek, Bill works with Joey (Shawn Doyle) in finding help in fighting back against Roman. He considers Ernest Holloway (John Ingle), a former polygamist who appears to have given up on the practice. He offers Ernest enough money to open his P.E. program again, but Ernest refuses to speak badly of Roman. Later, Ernest changes his mind and provides him with a journal detailing Roman's background with Bill's grandfather Orville. Back home, Margie decides to cut ties with Pam and claim that Nicki is a good person. After Bill baptizes Tennie, Margie asks him to baptize her as well, expressing her commitment to her family. As the family celebrates, Ben is shown praying in his bedroom, asking God to forgive him for losing his virginity.

== Production ==
=== Development ===
The episode was written by Dustin Lance Black, and directed by Michael Lehmann. This was Black's first writing credit, and Lehmann's first directing credit.

== Reception ==
=== Viewers ===
In its original American broadcast, "The Baptism" was seen by an estimated 3.80 million household viewers. This was a 6% decrease in viewership from the previous episode, which was watched by an estimated 4.04 million household viewers.

=== Critical reviews ===
"The Baptism" received positive reviews from critics. Michael Peck of TV Guide wrote, "All other plot points don't matter any more than the fact that I actually found someone to hate more than Nicki. And that'd be Cindy, Barb's holier-than-thou sis (tough to do on this show, but she pulls it off. Anyone who's ever had family issues knows how tough it is to confront such situations, and that self-righteous braggart's about as bad as they come.)"

Michael Sciannamea of TV Squad wrote, "As the season enters its final two episodes, we'll have to keep an eye out for Bill in his dealings with "Brother" Holloway and whether this relationship will force Roman to act, and if Bill's family stays united or if Ben and Sarah continue to hear others speak disparagingly of their parents' situation." Television Without Pity gave the episode a "B+" grade.
