= Polygamy czar =

Utah Attorney General position

The Investigator of Crimes within Closed Societies for the Utah Attorney General's Office, informally known as the Polygamy czar, is a dormant position responsible for investigating crimes associated with Fundamentalist Mormon communities that practice plural marriage, including tax evasion, welfare fraud, child abuse, sex abuse and domestic violence in Utah. Established by the Utah State Legislature in 2000, the office has contributed to the prosecutions of polygamists Rodney Holm and Tom Green on child rape and bigamy charges.

== History ==
The office was created by the Utah State Legislature voting in favor of it in 2000 due to the Governor of Utah, Mike Leavitt announcing a crackdown on polygamy within the state. The polygamy czar was to investigate polygamy within the state and the associated welfare fraud and child protection issues. Ron Barton was appointed as the first polygamy czar as Utah's only investigator for polygamy crimes. He received criticism from Fundamentalist Mormons for his style of investigation, including attending funerals of deceased polygamists.

By 2003, Barton revealed that he had only brought two prosecutions as polygamy czar, against Holm and Green, due to the fact that he was focussing on crimes against children whilst leaving fraud investigations to general authorities. Barton resigned as polygamy czar in 2004 and was replaced by Jim Hill. Hill spent most of his time investigating the Latter Day Church of Christ (also known as the Kingston Group). Hill then resigned to take up a crime lab role within the Salt Lake City Police Department.

As of July 2025, the office has not been filled since Jim Hill's resignation. Officials of the Attorney General's office reiterated a policy of not "pursu[ing] cases of bigamy between consenting adults" as early as 2009. In 2017, Parker Douglas, the Utah federal solicitor and assistant counsel to the Attorney General, expressed that the Attorney General was diverting no special resources to pursuing crimes committed by polygamists.

== Officeholders ==
- Ron Barton (2000–2004)
- Jim Hill (2004–2006)
