= Will Scheffer =

American playwright (born 1969)

- Born: September 21, 1969 (age 56)
- Education: State University of New York, Purchase (BFA)
- Occupations: Producer, Playwright
- Notable work: Big Love, Getting On
- Spouse: Mark V. Olsen

Will Scheffer is an American playwright, and was co-creator and executive producer of the television series Big Love and the American remake of Getting On with longtime life partner Mark V. Olsen. He is president and CEO of Anima Sola Productions, which he founded with Olsen in 1992 to create television and film content.

His writing credits include Big Love: In the Beginning, Ellis Island, Duck Town, Easter, In the Gloaming, The Pact, Citizen Baines, and Getting On.

== Life ==
=== Family ===
Scheffer's father, Ben, was a Holocaust survivor, who emigrated from the Netherlands through Ellis Island in 1941. His mother, Sandra, was the daughter of Jews who fled Russia in 1916.

=== Education ===
Scheffer attended State University of New York at Purchase where he earned a Bachelor of Fine Arts with Honors in Theater.

=== Career ===
In 1997, Scheffer received the Variety magazine "One of the Rising Writers to Watch" award. He has also taught and lectured at Bernard M. Baruch College, Lewis and Clark College and School of Visual Arts, Manhattan, New York City.

=== Personal life ===
Scheffer is openly gay; he and Olsen have been married to each other since the early 1990s. About their collaborative process, Scheffer said: "Mark and I talk everything through but don't actually write together. We take turns on drafts, passing them back and forth for multiple revisions. Sometimes I'll write the first draft and he'll revise and sometimes he'll write the first draft. On set it's looser and we'll have to revise together but we prefer to actually write in our own space. The 'fantasy' image of having desks facing each other and tossing lines back and forth doesn't work for us."

== Works ==
- Scheffer, Will (1999). Falling Man, and Other Monologues. New York: Dramatists Play Service. ISBN 082221668X.
- Scheffer, Will (1999). Easter. New York, NY: Dramatists Play Service. ISBN 0822216671.
