= Mark V. Olsen =

American television producer and screenwriter

- Born: 1962 (age 63–64); United States
- Occupations: Producer, Writer, Attorney

Mark V. Olsen (born 1962) is an American television producer and screenwriter. He was the co-creator and executive producer of the HBO series Big Love and Getting On along with his writing partner and husband Will Scheffer. In 2007, Olsen and Scheffer won a TV Writers Guild of America Award for the pilot episode of Big Love.

== Overview ==
Olsen grew up in Hastings, Nebraska. He is also an attorney, and a member of the New York bar.

Olsen is openly gay; since the early 1990s, he and professional partner Will Scheffer have also been married to each other.

Prior to the television show Big Love, Olsen co-produced the independent feature-length movie Easter (2002), which was originally written as a play by Scheffer. Olsen also wrote a six-part miniseries for HBO known as Mary Chestnut's Civil War.
