= Big Love =

American drama television series

- Intertitle (seasons 1–3)
- Genre: Drama
- Created by: Mark V. Olsen; Will Scheffer
- Starring: Bill Paxton; Jeanne Tripplehorn; Chloë Sevigny; Ginnifer Goodwin; Amanda Seyfried; Douglas Smith; Grace Zabriskie; Mary Kay Place; Matt Ross; Cassi Thomson; Shawn Doyle; Mireille Enos; Željko Ivanek; Melora Walters; Joel McKinnon Miller; Daveigh Chase; Jolean Wejbe; Bruce Dern; Harry Dean Stanton
- Opening theme: "God Only Knows" by the Beach Boys (seasons 1–3); "Home" by Engineers (seasons 4–5)
- Composers: Mark Mothersbaugh (season 1); David Byrne (season 2); Anton Sanko (seasons 3–5)
- Country of origin: United States
- Original language: English
- No. of seasons: 5
- No. of episodes: 53 (list of episodes)

Production
- Executive producers: Tom Hanks; Gary Goetzman; Mark V. Olsen; Will Scheffer; Gregg Fienberg; David Knoller
- Running time: 46–58 minutes
- Production companies: Anima Sola Productions; Playtone; HBO Entertainment

Original release
- Network: HBO
- Release: March 12, 2006 – March 20, 2011

Big Love is an American drama television series created by Mark V. Olsen and Will Scheffer that aired on HBO from 2006 to 2011. It stars Bill Paxton as the patriarch of a fundamentalist Mormon family in contemporary Utah that practices polygamy, with Jeanne Tripplehorn, Chloë Sevigny, and Ginnifer Goodwin portraying his wives. The series charts the family's life in and out of the public sphere in their Salt Lake City suburb, as well as their associations with a fundamentalist compound in the area. It features key supporting performances from Amanda Seyfried, Grace Zabriskie, Daveigh Chase, Matt Ross, Mary Kay Place, Aaron Paul, Bruce Dern, Melora Walters, and Harry Dean Stanton.

The series premiered in the United States on March 12, 2006, following the sixth-season premiere of the HBO series The Sopranos. Big Love was a success for HBO, running for five seasons before concluding its run on March 20, 2011.

Big Love received widespread critical acclaim, and earned several major awards and nominations throughout its run. The third season was nominated for the Primetime Emmy Award for Outstanding Drama Series, and the first three were nominated for the Golden Globe Award for Best Television Series - Drama. For acting, Chloë Sevigny won a Golden Globe Award for Best Supporting Actress in the series' third season, and Bill Paxton was nominated three times for his leading role. At the Emmys, Ellen Burstyn, Bruce Dern, Mary Kay Place, and Sissy Spacek were all nominated for their recurring roles, while series' creators Olsen and Scheffer won the Writers Guild of America Award for Television: Episodic Drama.

The series has been the subject of articles in academic journals, including the Columbia Law Review, Law and Contemporary Problems, and Michigan Journal of Gender & Law. Several publications listed the series's first three seasons as among the best television of the decade 2000–09, and its final season ranked among the best-reviewed scripted series of 2011.

== Development ==
=== Concept and writing ===
Big Love was created by Mark V. Olsen and Will Scheffer, who also served as executive producers. Olsen and Scheffer spent nearly three years researching the premise of the show, with the intent of creating a "fair, non-judgmental portrayal of polygamy in America." Olsen said the family dynamics were key to the series' narrative, mixing family affection with tensions. "It's that combustion, negotiating that mix of feelings that I think keeps an audience coming back for more."

The fictional fundamentalist group the United Effort Brotherhood (UEB) has characteristics similar to the United Effort Plan established in 1942 by the Fundamentalist Church of Jesus Christ of Latter Day Saints (FLDS) and taken over by the state of Utah in 2005. The FLDS is a polygamist group and identifies itself as the legitimate successor of the Church of Jesus Christ of Latter-day Saints, which officially discontinued polygamy in 1890.

Creators Olsen and Scheffer included a drive through the twin FLDS towns of Hildale, Utah, and Colorado City, Arizona, as part of their research for the show. The UEB has built its own temple on its Kansas compound. The raid on Juniper Creek is reminiscent of the Short Creek raid in 1953, when Arizona state police and National Guard troops took action against polygamists in Colorado City. Many of the businesses owned by the UEB are similar to businesses formerly run by FLDS members under the non-fictional UEP, which managed financial holdings of the FLDS. The creators read a single 2003 article published in Utah on the Darger family, who are Independent Fundamentalist Mormons.

=== Filming and sets ===
Although set in Utah, the series was primarily filmed at the Santa Clarita Studios in Valencia, California. The location used for filming "Henrickson's Home Plus" scenes was The All American Home Center in Downey, California.

The exterior scenes of the three homes that Bill owns were filmed on location on Shady Lane, in the small town of Fillmore, California.

The mall scenes from season one were filmed in the Fox Hills Mall, in Culver City, California. Other exterior shots were filmed in Downtown Salt Lake City, Utah, and Sandy, Utah, as well as northeast Los Angeles, California.

== Music ==
During the first three seasons, "God Only Knows", by The Beach Boys, played during the opening titles (and a cover version at the end of the series finale). The musical score for the series was composed by Anton Sanko. Mark Mothersbaugh composed music for the first season, while David Byrne was in charge of music during the second season. The theme song for the final two seasons of the series was "Home", by the band Engineers.

== Cast and characters ==
=== Overview ===
= Main cast
= Recurring cast
= Guest cast

Actor	Character	Seasons				
Actor	Character	1	2	3	4	5
Main characters
Bill Paxton	Bill Henrickson	Main	Main	Main	Main	Main
Jeanne Tripplehorn	Barbara Henrickson	Main	Main	Main	Main	Main
Chloë Sevigny	Nicolette Grant	Main	Main	Main	Main	Main
Ginnifer Goodwin	Margene Heffman	Main	Main	Main	Main	Main
Amanda Seyfried	Sarah Henrickson	Main	Main	Main	Main	Guest
Douglas Smith	Ben Henrickson	Main	Main	Main	Recurring (Note: Despite appearing in every episode of season 4, Smith is credited as a guest star.)	Main
Shawn Doyle	Joey Henrickson	Main	Main	Main	Main	
Melora Walters	Wanda Henrickson	Main	Main	Main	Main	
Joel McKinnon Miller	Don Embry	Main	Main	Main	Recurring	Recurring
Daveigh Chase	Rhonda Volmer	Main	Main	Recurring		Recurring
Jolean Wejbe	Tancy "Teenie" Henrickson	Main	Main	Recurring (Note: In season 4, Tancy Henrickson is portrayed by Bella Thorne.)	Recurring	
Grace Zabriskie	Lois Henrickson	Main	Main	Main	Main	Main
Bruce Dern	Frank Harlow	Main	Recurring	Main (Note: In season 3, Dern and Place are credited with the main cast in the episode "Prom Queen"; in all other season 3 appearances they are credited as guest stars.)	Recurring	Recurring
Harry Dean Stanton	Roman Grant	Main (Note: In season 4, Stanton is credited with the main cast in the episodes "The Mighty and Strong" and "Next Ticket Out"; in "Free at Last" and "The Greater Good" he is uncredited and in "Strange Bedfellows" he is credited as a guest star.)	Main	Main	Main	
Matt Ross	Albert "Alby" Grant	Recurring	Main	Main	Main	Main
Mireille Enos	Kathy Marquart / JoDean Marquart		Recurring	Main	Main	
Mary Kay Place	Adaleen Grant	Recurring	Recurring	Main	Recurring	Main
Zeljko Ivanek	J.J. Percy Walker			Recurring	Main	
Cassi Thomson	Cara Lynn Walker			Guest	Main	Main

=== Leading cast ===
- Bill Paxton as Bill Henrickson – Husband to Barb, Nicki, and Margene. He is a practicing polygamist and, at the end of season 4, is elected to the Utah State Senate.
- Jeanne Tripplehorn as Barbara "Barb" Henrickson – Bill's first wife and the only wife to whom he is legally married; mother of Sarah, Ben, and Tancy ("Teeny").
- Chloë Sevigny as Nicolette "Nicki" Grant – Bill's second wife, Barb's former caretaker during her bout with cancer, and Roman Grant's daughter; mother of Wayne and Raymond with Bill, and Cara Lynn with J.J.
- Ginnifer Goodwin as Margene "Margie" Heffman – Bill's third and youngest wife; mother of Aaron, Lester, and Nell.
- Amanda Seyfried as Sarah Henrickson – Bill and Barb's first daughter, struggling with her father's polygamy. She marries ex-Mormon Scott Quittman despite her parents' initial reservations.
- Douglas Smith as Ben Henrickson – Bill and Barb's son. In the third season, he expresses his sexual attraction and love to Margene, his third mother, who pacifies him as she loves him as a son. He has stated his desire to follow The Principle—to practice polygamy, as his father does.

=== Henrickson family and friends ===
- Branka Katić as Ana Mesovich– Bill's fourth wife. She and Bill marry, then she divorces the family.
- Jolean Wejbe (replaced by Bella Thorne for Season 4) as Tancy "Teenie" Henrickson – Bill and Barb's younger daughter.
- Keegan Holst as Wayne Henrickson – Bill and Nicki's older son.
- Garrett Grey as Raymond Henrickson – Bill and Nicki's younger son.
- Hayden Zachery Nelson as Aaron Henrickson - Bill and Margene's son.
- Gavin Kent / Ethan Kent as Lester Henrickson - Bill and Margene's son.
- Ailish (replaced by Julia O'Connor in season 4) as Nell Henrickson – Bill and Margene's daughter.
- Aaron Paul as Scott Quittman – Sarah's boyfriend and eventual husband.
- Tina Majorino as Heather Tuttle – Sarah Henrickson's co-worker and best friend.
- Bonnie Bedelia as Virginia "Ginger" Heffman – Margene's alcoholic mother.

==== Extended Henrickson family ====
- Shawn Doyle as Joey Henrickson – Bill's brother, Wanda's husband. Former professional football player with the Dallas Cowboys. He attempts to enter into polygamy like Bill and his forefathers, albeit reluctantly at first. (Seasons 1–4)
- Melora Walters as Wanda Henrickson – Bill's sister-in-law, wife to Joey Henrickson, and sister of Nicki's first husband, J.J. Wanda's psychological problems surface when she poisons people who cross her or her family. (Seasons 1–4)
- Bruce Dern as Frank Harlow – Bill's abusive and domineering father, who exiled Bill from Juniper Creek at age 14. In a strong, perennial, and sometimes violent feud with his wife Lois.
- Grace Zabriskie as Lois Henrickson – Bill's mother. In a long-time feud against Bill's father, Frank Harlow that included attempted homicide.
- Brian Kerwin as Eddie Henrickson – Lois' younger brother, Bill's maternal uncle.
- Aidan Gonzales and Andrew Gonzales as Joey Henrickson Jr. – Joey and Wanda's son.
- Christopher Randazzo and Zachary Randazzo as Joey Henrickson Jr. – Joey and Wanda's son. (season 4)
- Mireille Enos as JoDean Marquart and Kathy Marquart – Kathy is Joey's second wife-to-be until her death in a car accident while being chased by Roman Grant. She lived in Joey and Wanda's home and assisted with the care of their infant son. Her twin sister, JoDean, marries Frank as his newest wife. (Seasons 3–4)

==== Dutton family ====
- Ellen Burstyn as Nancy Dutton – Barb's semi-estranged mother.
- Judith Hoag as Cindy Dutton-Price – Barb's sister.
- Patrick Fabian as Ted Price – Cindy's husband.
- Philip Baker Hall as Ned Johanssen - Barb's new stepfather.

==== Grant family ====
- Harry Dean Stanton as Roman Grant – Nicki and Alby's father, self-proclaimed Prophet, and leader of the Juniper Creek compound. He is smothered to death by Joey Henrickson to avenge his involvement in the death of Joey's fiancée Kathy.
- Mary Kay Place as Adaleen Hallstrom Grant – Roman Grant's sixth wife, mother of Nicki and Alby. She is Roman's most trusted confidante and is able to influence his political decisions. After Roman's death, Alby sends her to be a wife of J.J.'s against the wishes of Adaleen and Nicki.
- Daveigh Chase as Rhonda Volmer – A teenage sociopath who was to be married to Roman Grant. During Roman's trial, Rhonda was bribed to go away so she could not take the stand and damage the defense's case.
- Matt Ross as Alby Grant – Roman Grant's closeted gay son and the heir-apparent "Prophet" of Juniper Creek. He takes over the compound after Roman dies.
- Anne Dudek as Lura Grant – Third and favorite wife of Alby. She helps Alby try to kill Roman in both the second and third seasons.
- Željko Ivanek as J.J. Percy Walker – Nicki's first husband and father of Nicki's firstborn, daughter Cara Lynn. J.J. is domineering, and with Alby's pull, forces the widowed Adaleen to marry him.
- Cassi Thomson as Cara Lynn Walker - Nicki and J.J.'s daughter.

==== Bill's business partners and associates ====
- Joel McKinnon Miller as Don Embry – Bill's business partner and best friend. A polygamist until two of his wives ran away, leaving him a monogamist both in spirit and in fact. Bill asked him to take a 'bullet'—by confessing his polygamy to a reporter—to allow Bill's state senate candidacy to move forward.
- Wendy Phillips as Peg Embry – Don's wife, Home Plus' head bookkeeper.
- Kyle Gallner as Jason Embry – Don and Peg's son, Ben's best friend. Jason isn't fond of polygamy.
- Annie Fitzgerald as Verna – Don's second wife.
- Renee Albert as Julep ("Jo-Jo") – Don's third wife.
- Lawrence O'Donnell as Lee Hatcher – Bill's attorney.
- Jim Beaver as Carter Reese – Business acquaintance of Bill.
- Jodie Markell as Wendy Hunt – Bill's secretary and the company's junior bookkeeper.
- Adam Beach as Tommy Flute – Jerry Flute's son and a manager of the Blackfoot Casino.
- Luke Askew as Hollis S. Green – Patriarch and proclaimed Prophet of a rival polygamist group. Hollis serves as one of the show's antagonists. His sect frequently uses violence and kidnapping for its ends.
- Sandy Martin as Selma Green – Hollis' first wife and partner, Roman's youngest sister. A masculine-deep-voiced woman who usually wears male clothes and hairstyles.
- Gregory Itzin as Senator Dwyer – The Republican Senate President of the Utah State Senate.
- Sissy Spacek as Marilyn Densham - A powerful political lobbyist who becomes Bill's enemy.

=== Recurring ===
- Robert Patrick as Bud Mayberry – Leader of a polygamist fringe group.
- Mark L. Young as Franky – Frank's son with Nita. Despite the significant age difference between Bill and Franky, Bill considers Franky to be as much his brother as Joey is. Franky is the boyfriend of Rhonda Volmer during the first half of the third season.
- Carlos Jacott and Audrey Wasilewski as Carl Martin and Pam Martin – Neighbors of the Henricksons'.
- Sarah Jones as Brynn – Ben's ex-girlfriend.
- Robert Beltran as Jerry Flute – Business representative of a Native American reservation that wants to build a casino with Bill's collaboration.
- Noa Tishby as Ladonna Flute – Jerry's assertive, opinionated wife.
- Michele Greene as Sheila Jackson White – Channel 9 TV reporter.
- Charles Esten as Ray Henry – Head Prosecutor for the Roman Grant case. Had a flirtation and went on a date with Nicki before he learned of her true identity.
- Ben Koldyke as Dale Tomasson – Alby's lover, who hanged himself after Lura revealed his affair to his wife and family.
- Kevin Rankin as Verlan Walker – Cousin to Cara Lynn. He was kicked out when he became a teenager. It is revealed that he is married to Rhonda Vollmer with whom he has a child.
- Christian Campbell as Greg Ivey – Cara Lynn's high school math teacher and later lover.
- Katherine LaNasa as Beverly Ford, head of the shopping network Margene is on.

=== Family tree ===
Family tree

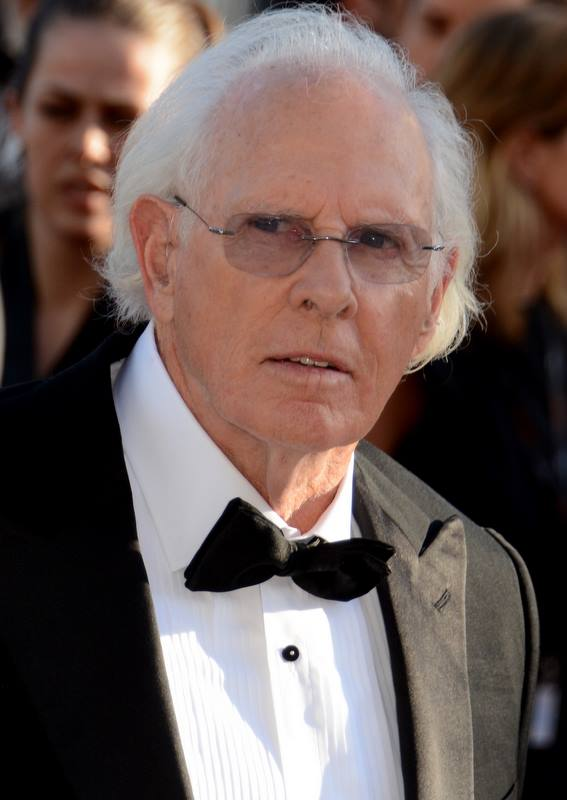
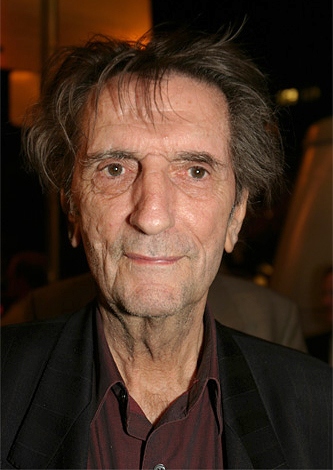
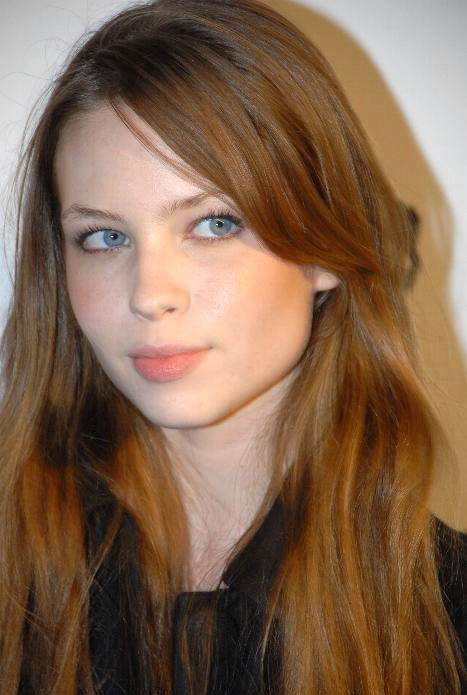
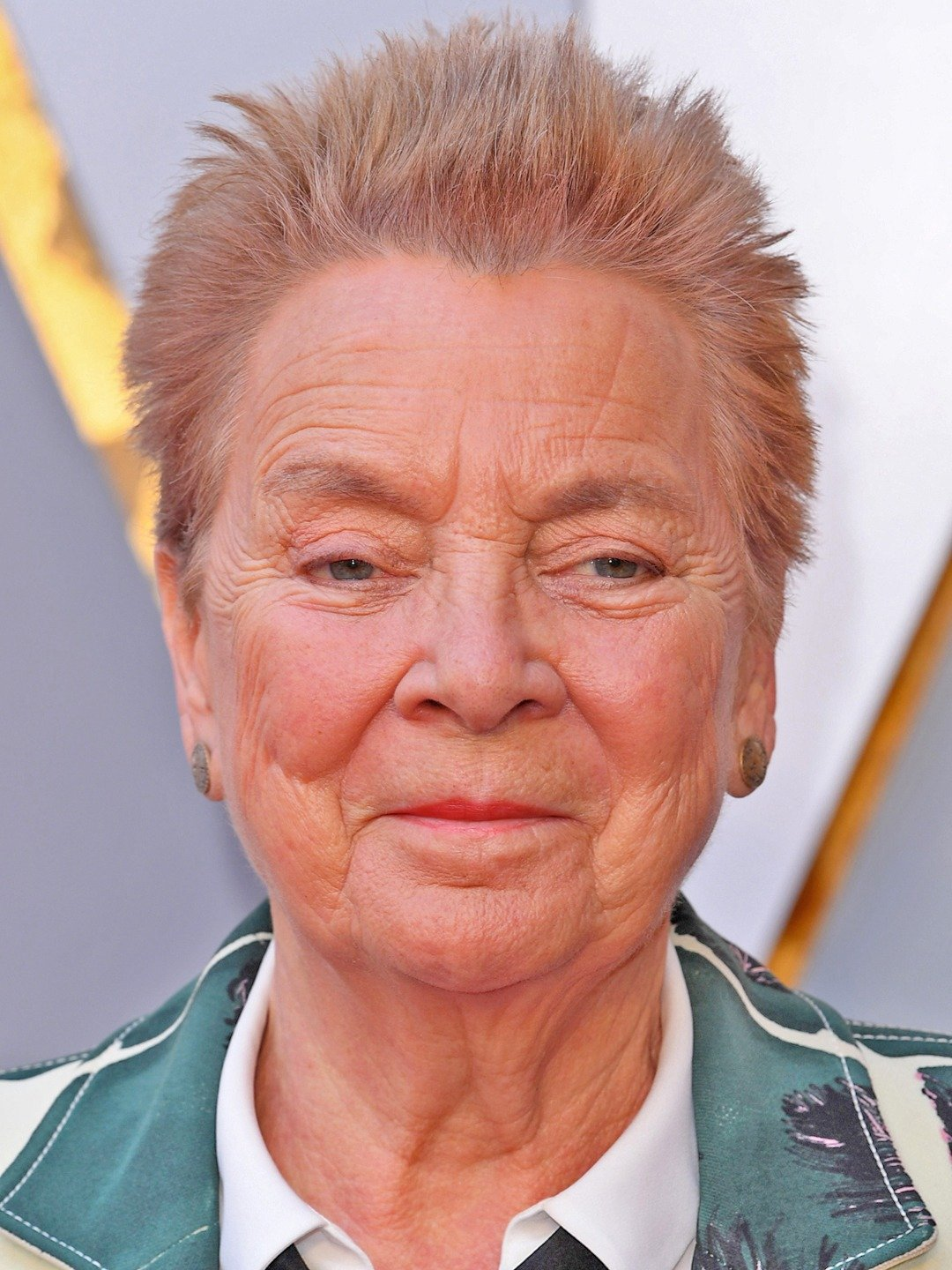
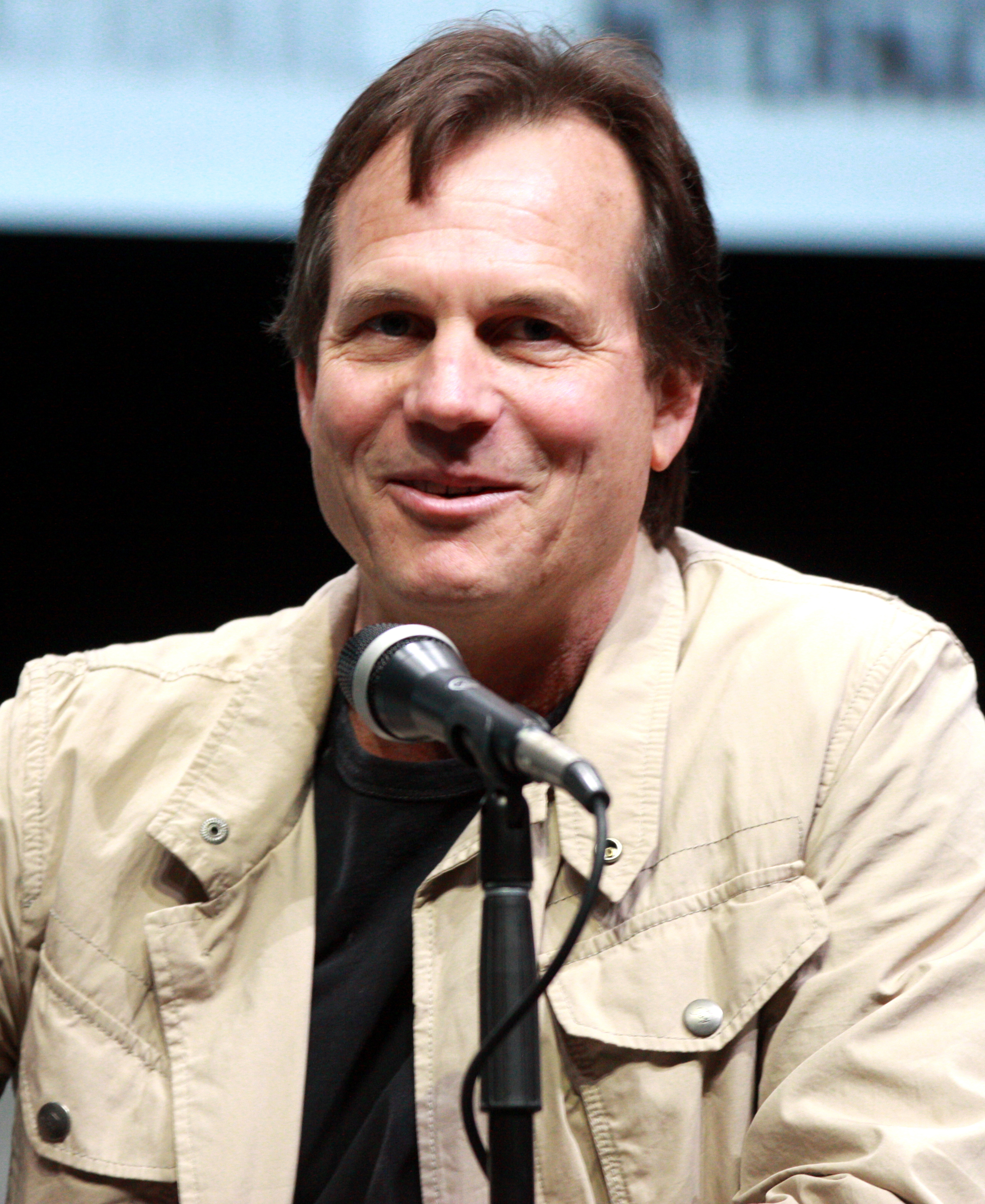
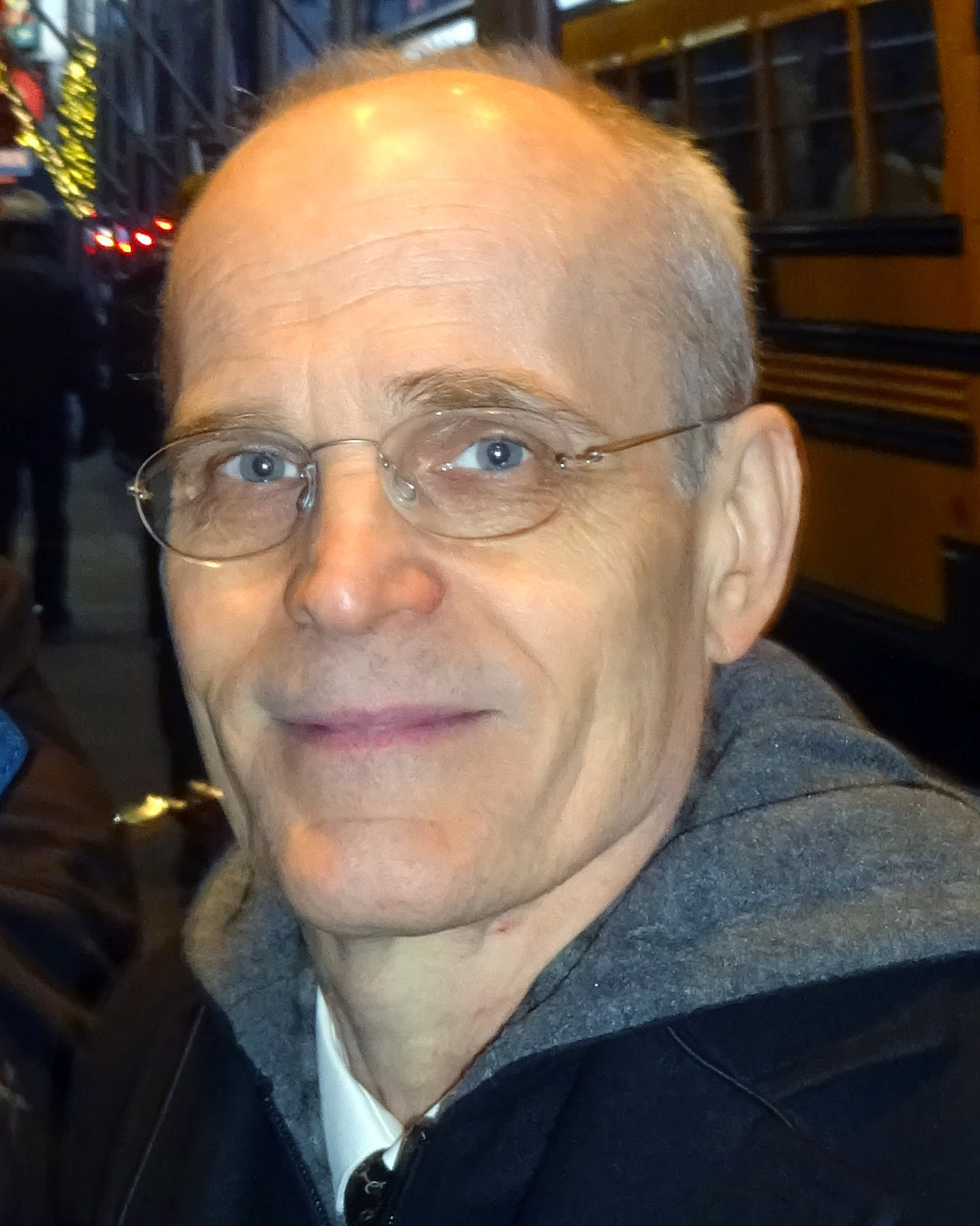
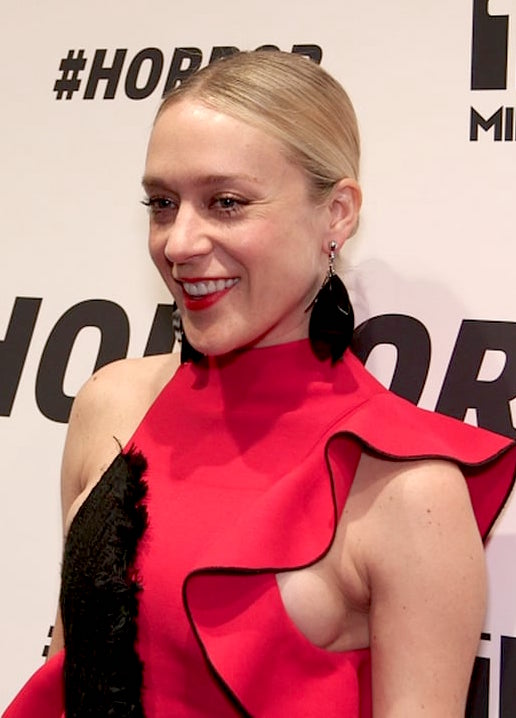
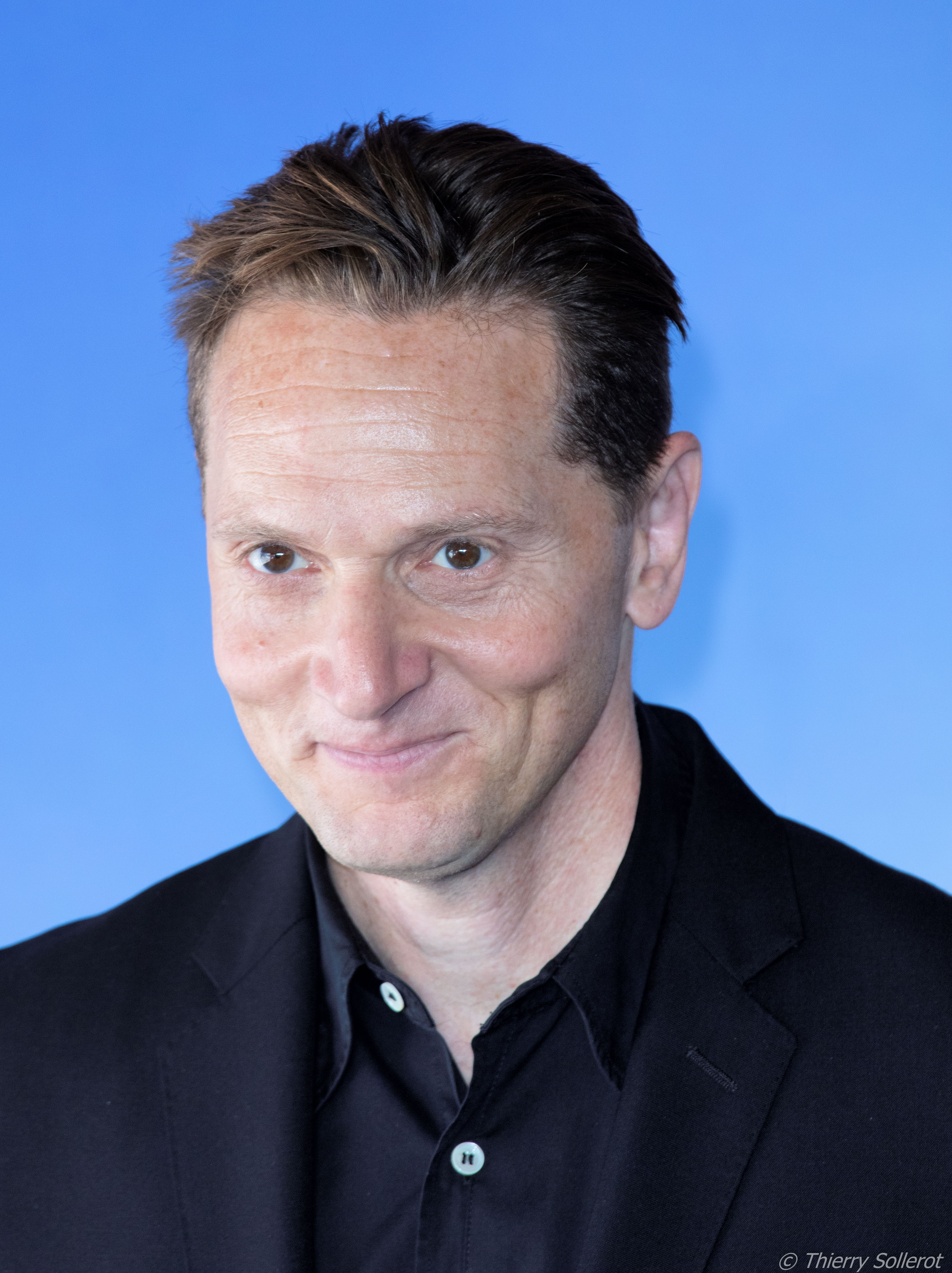
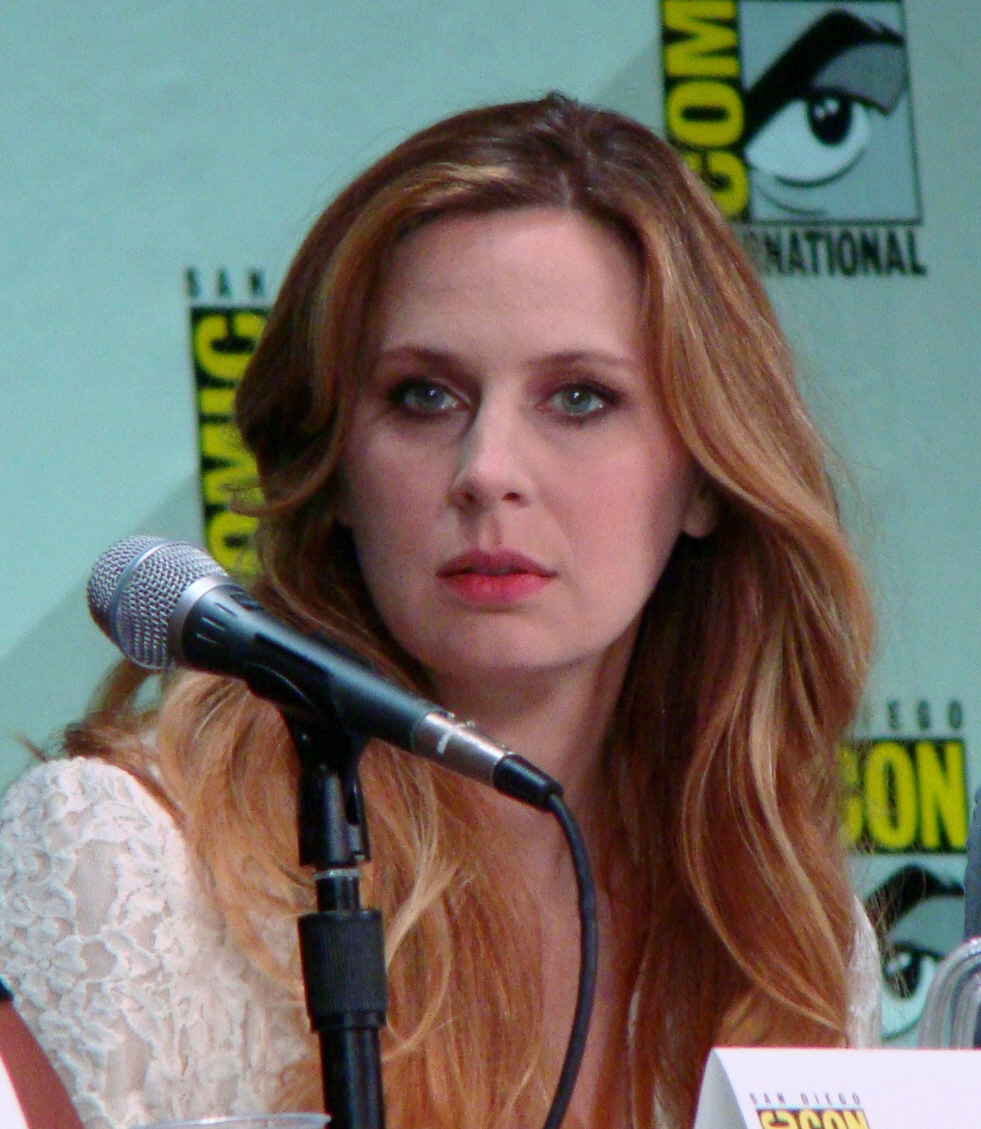
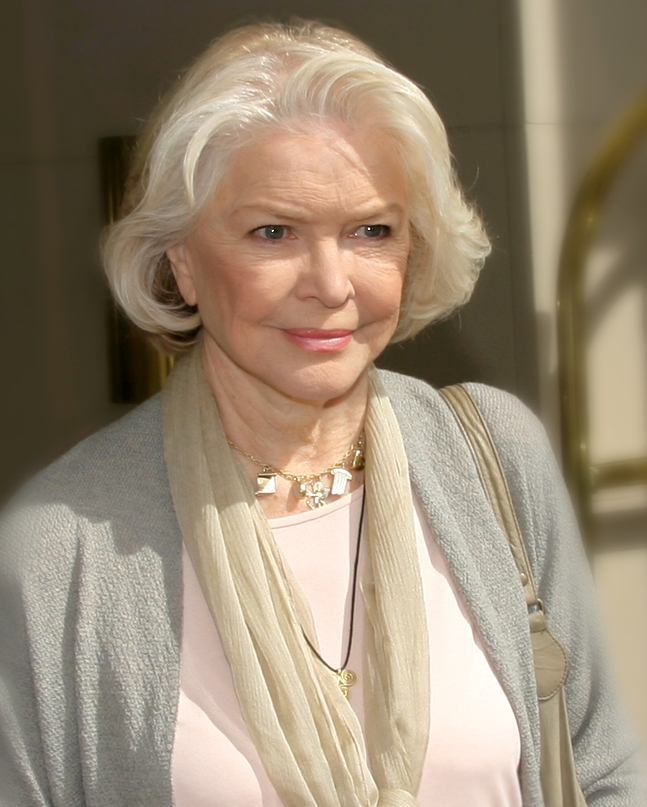
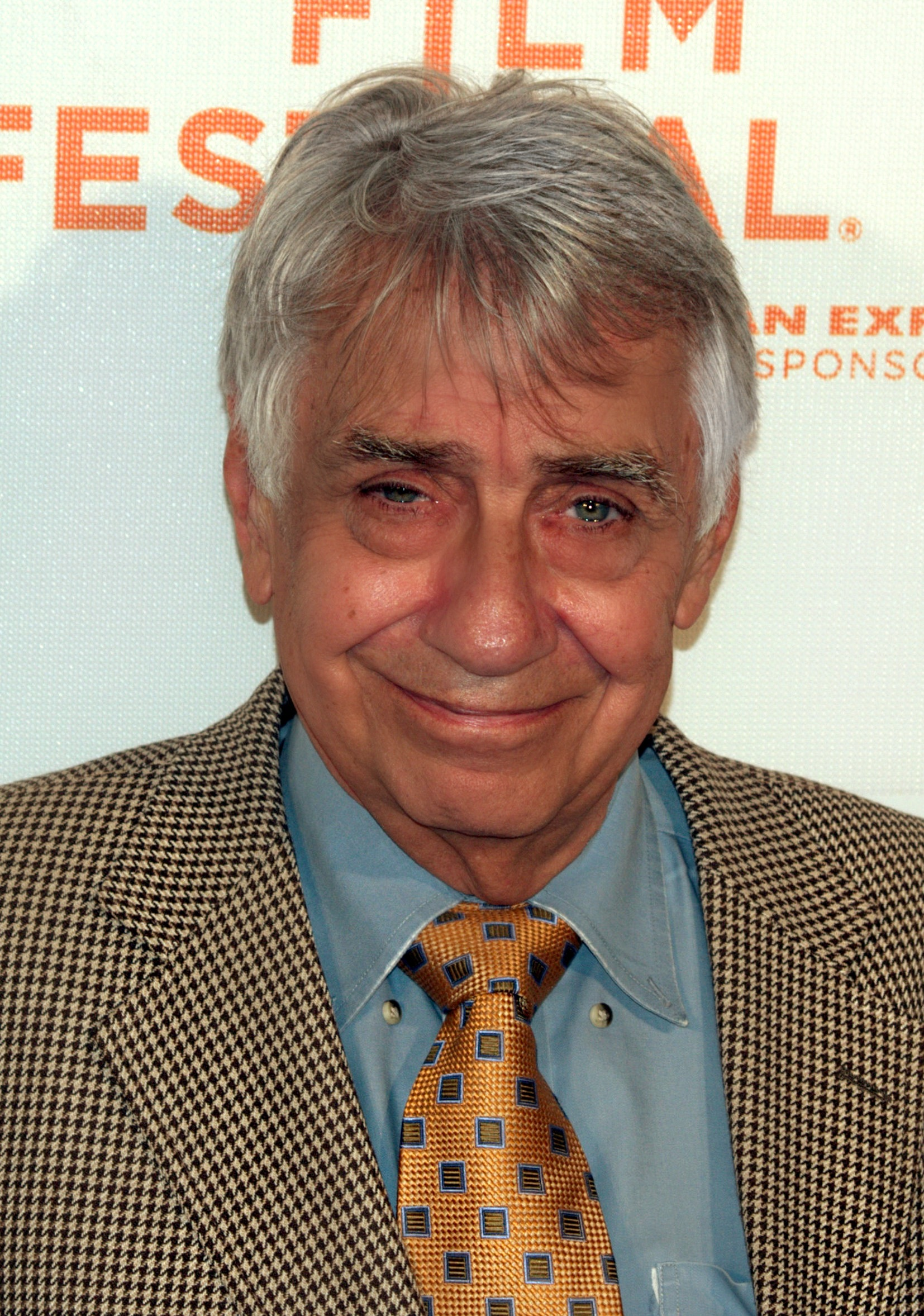
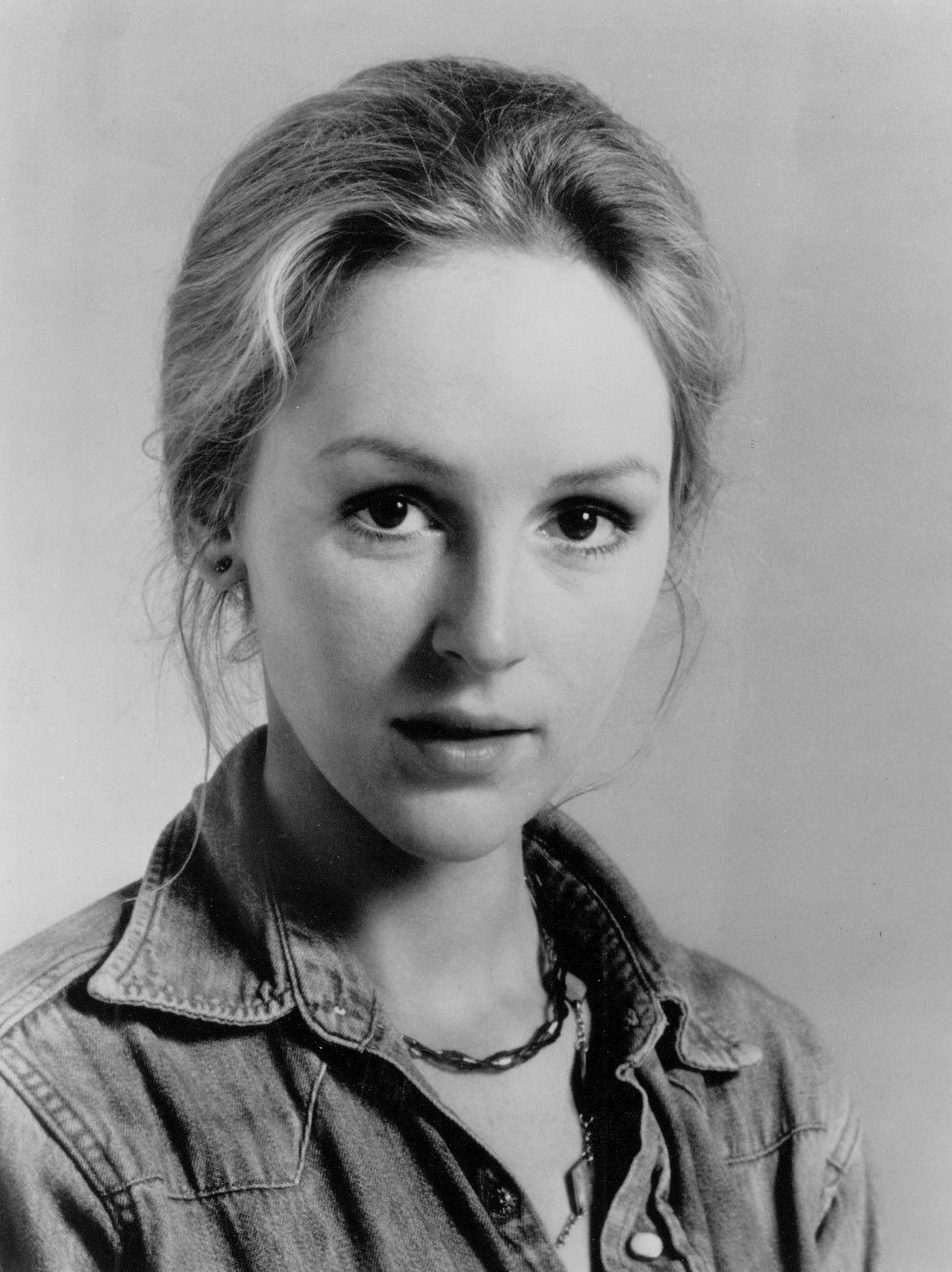
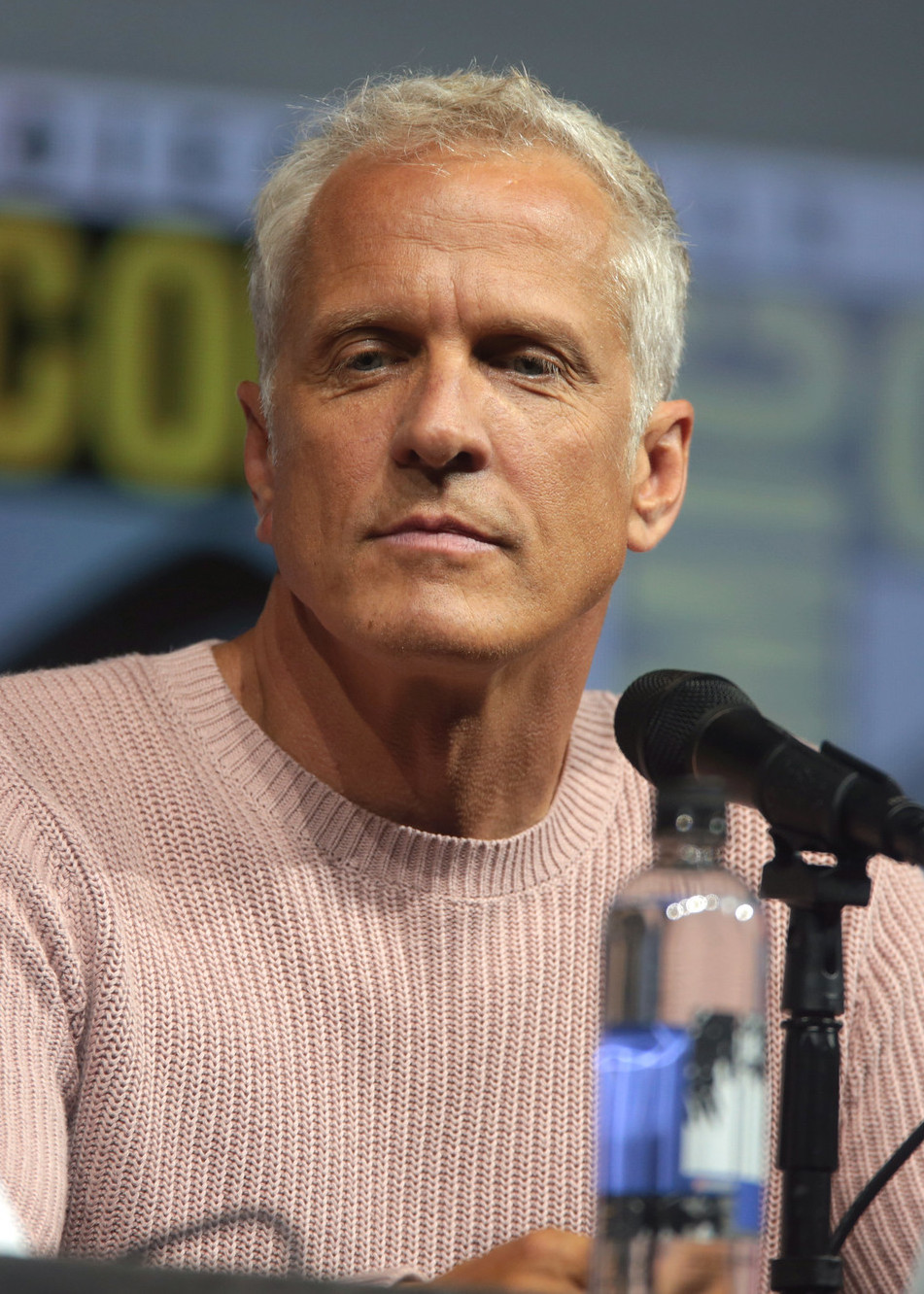
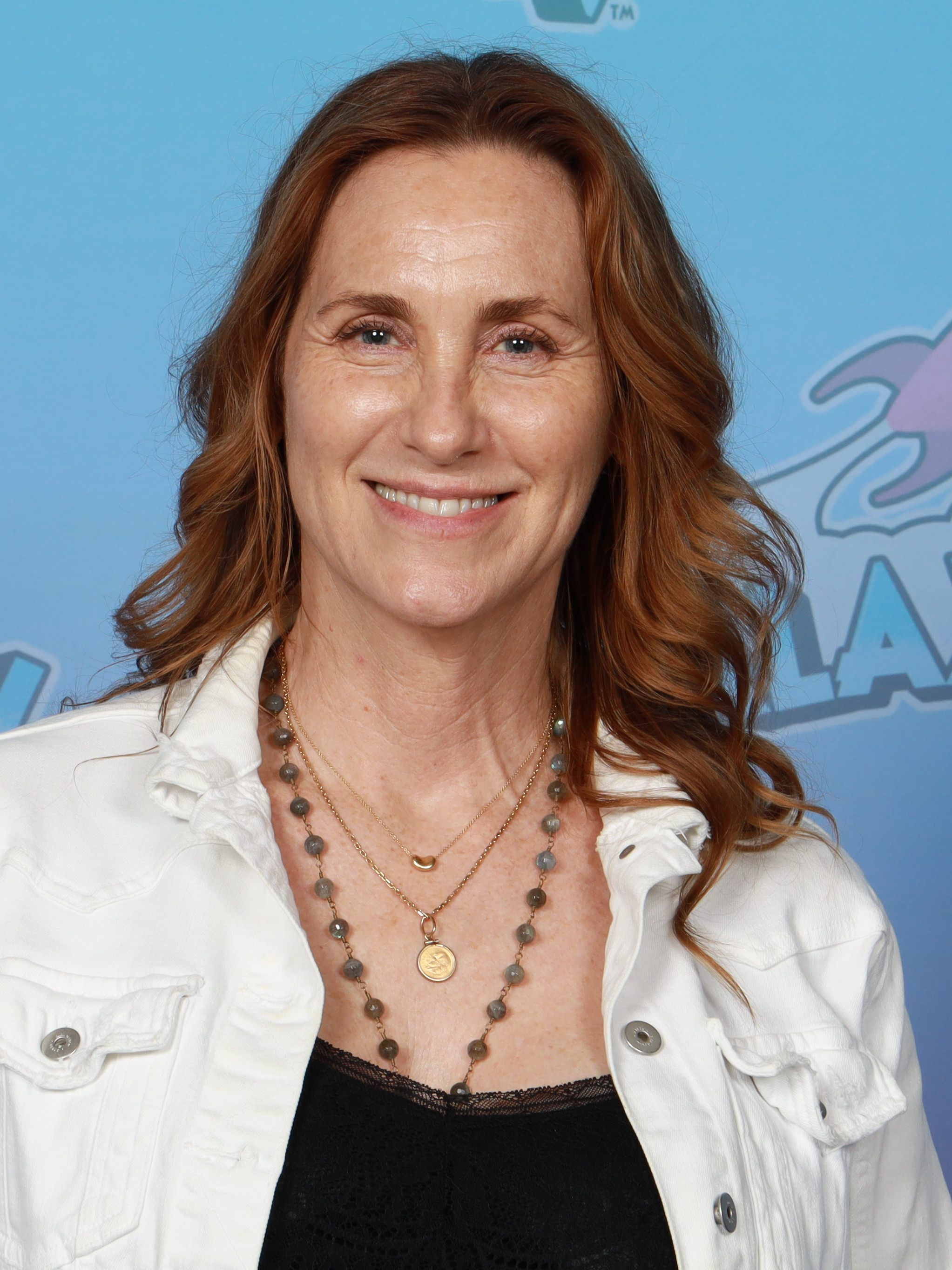
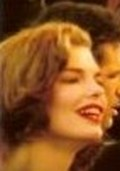
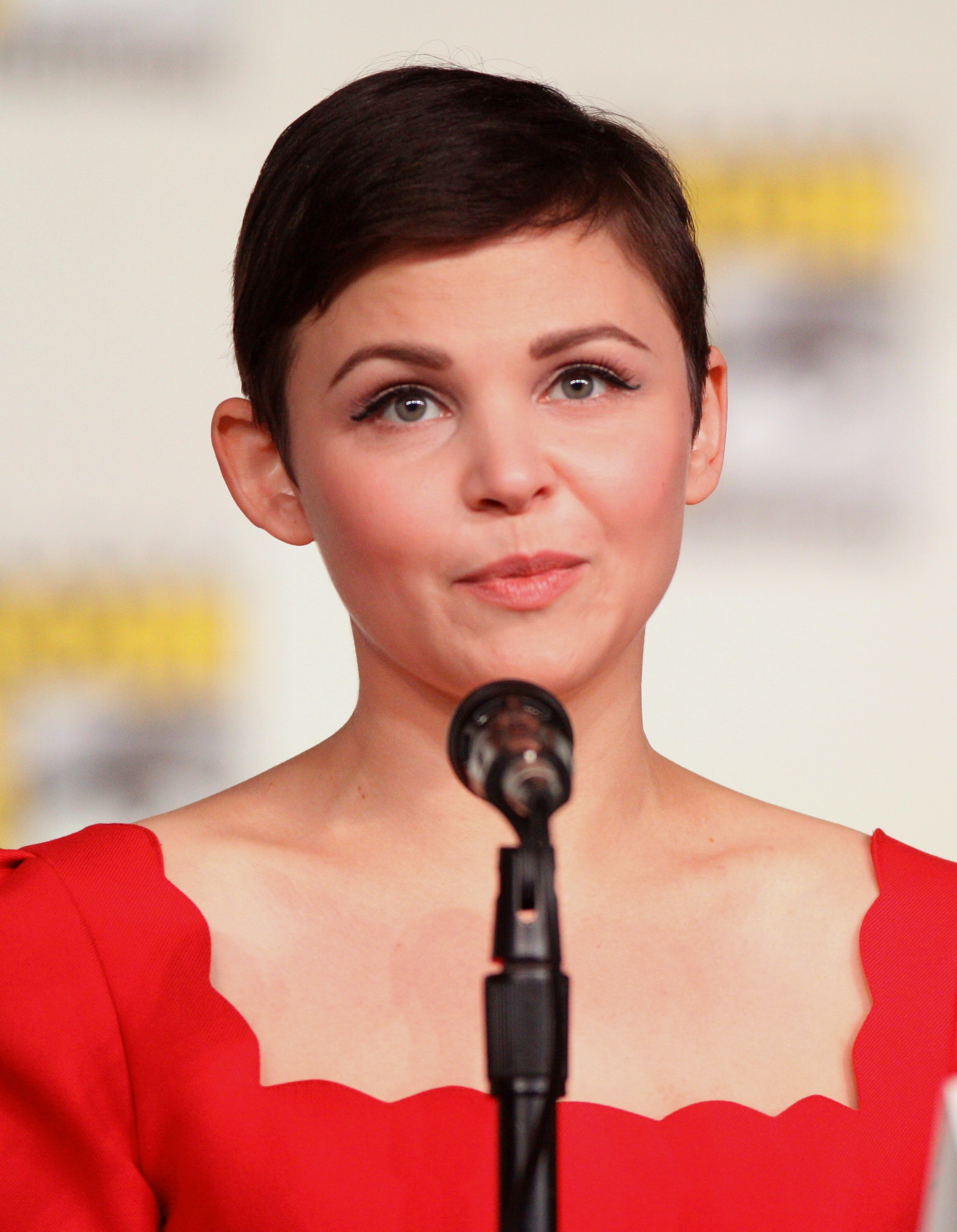
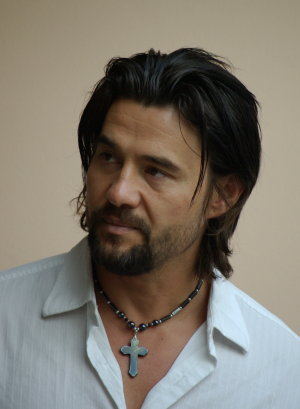
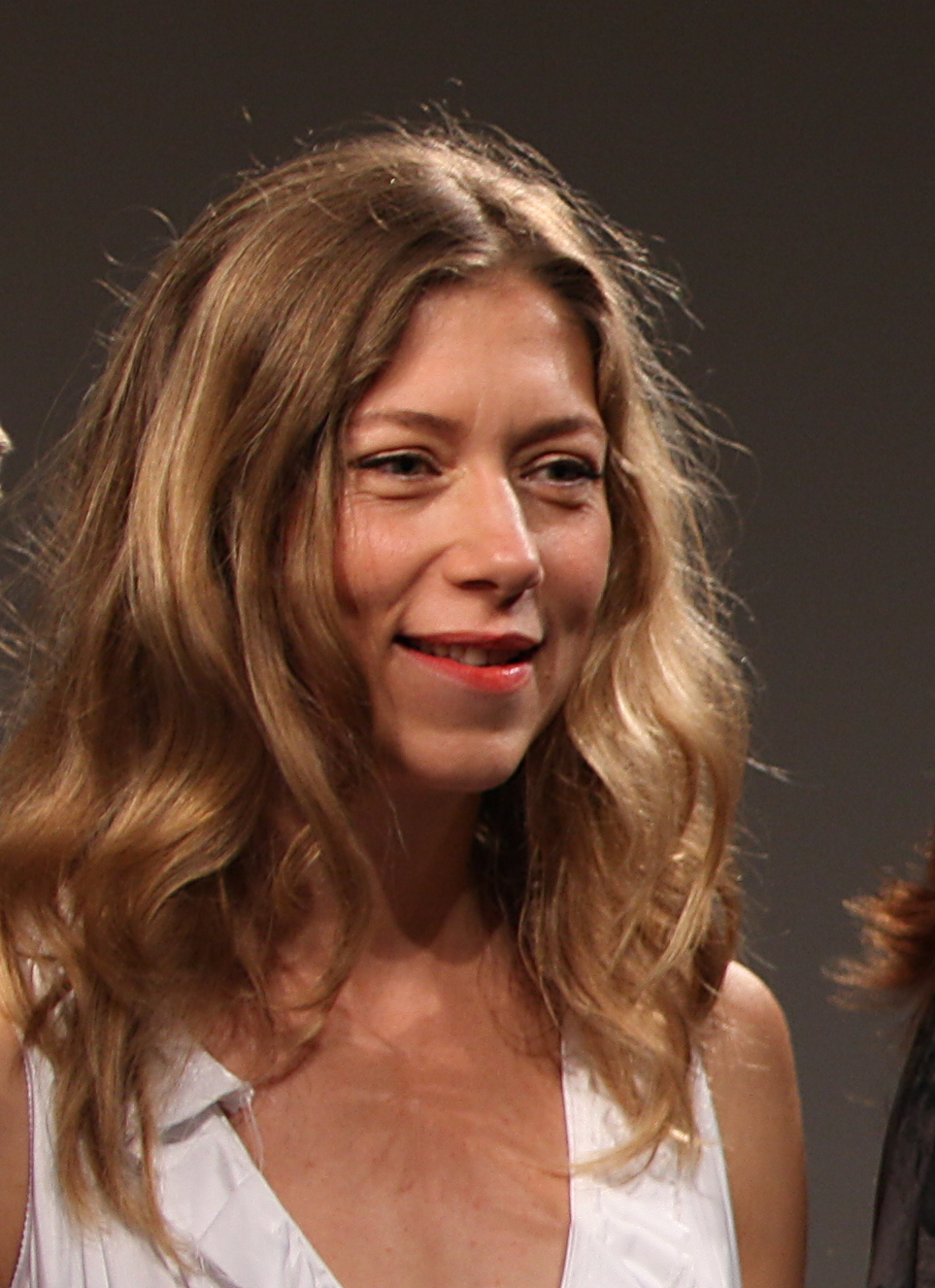
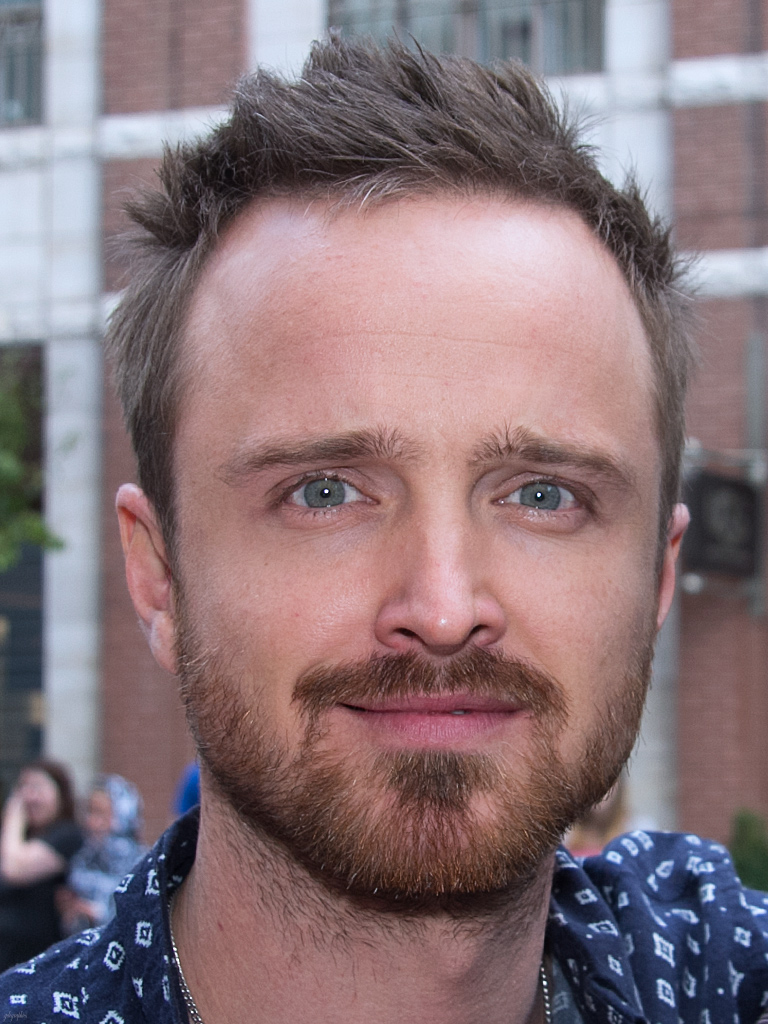
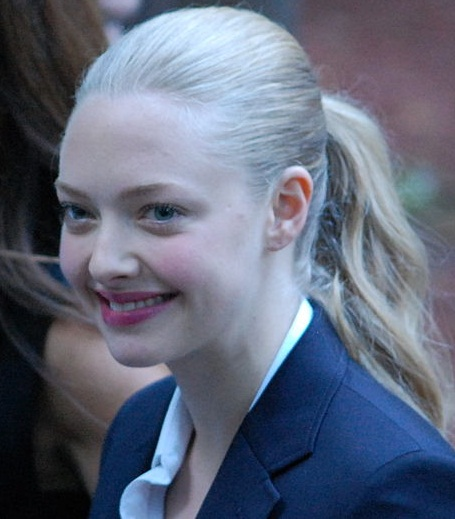
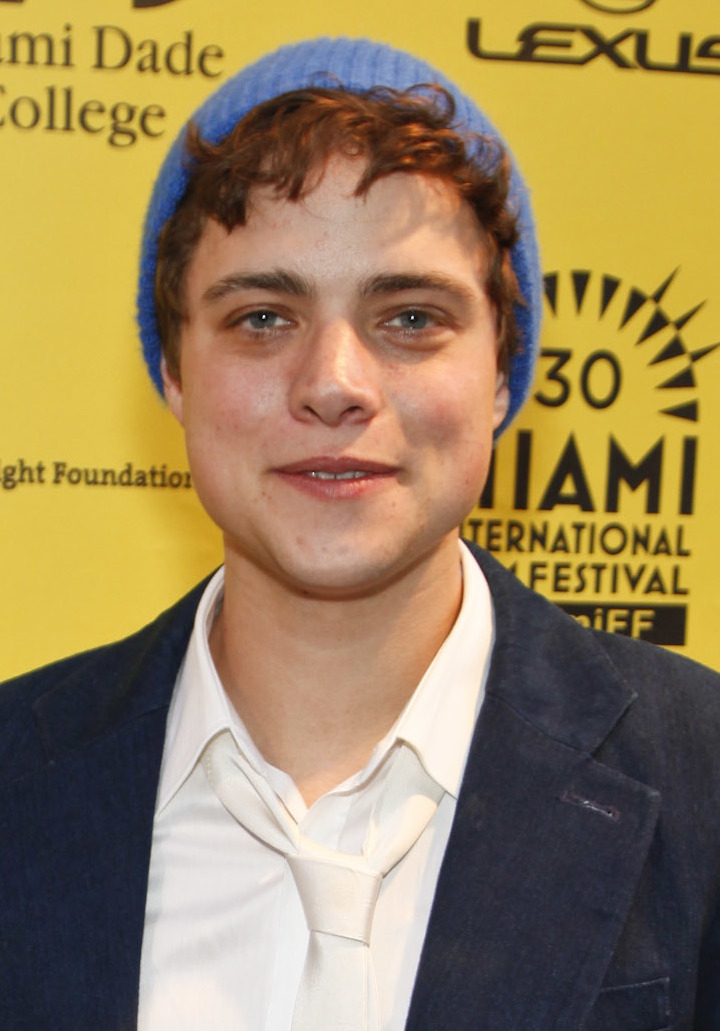
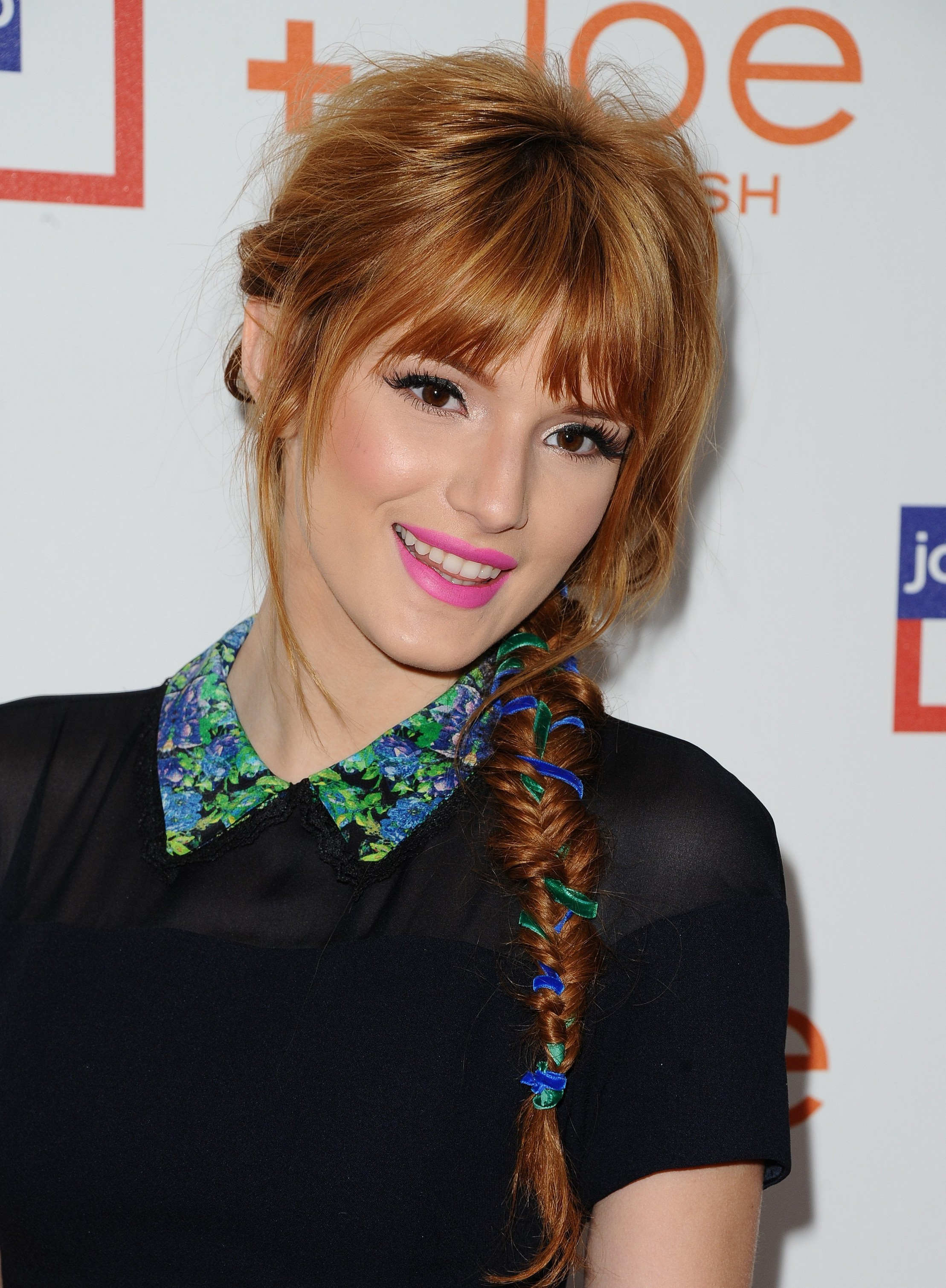
Orville Henrickson (deceased)	Unnamed woman (deceased)	Unnamed Man	Unnamed Woman
Frank Harlow (b. 1941)	Lois Henrickson (b. 1942)	Eddie Henrickson	Rae Henrickson	Unnamed Walker	Unnamed Walker	Adaleen Hallstrom Grant	Roman Grant (b. 1930 – d. 2009)	Rhonda Volmer Walker (b. 1991)	Selma Grant Green	Hollis Singer Green
William Orville "Bill" Henrickson	Margaret "Maggie" Henrickson (deceased) (Note: In season one, episode eight, Lois tells Sarah that Maggie drowned in Lake Mead, Nevada.)	Joseph "Joey" Henrickson (b. 1967)	Wanda Walker Henrickson	J.J. Percy Walker	Nicolette Eugenia "Nicki" Grant	Albert "Alby" Grant (b. 1972)	Lura
Joseph Henrickson Jr.	Cara Lynn Walker	Wayne Grant	Raymond Grant (b. 2002)
Mr. Dutton	Nancy Davis Dutton Johanssen	Ned Johanssen	Unnamed Father	Virginia "Ginger" Heffman (deceased)
Ted Price	Cynthia "Cindy" Dutton Price	Barbara "Barb" Dutton Henrickson	Margene Gretchen "Margie" Heffman	Goran Petrovic	Ana Marković
Kim Lee Price	Scott Quittman	Sarah Henrickson Quittman	Benjamin "Ben" Henrickson (b. 1991) (Note: Ben's sixteenth birthday is referenced in episode three, season two.)	Tancy "Teenie" Henrickson	Aaron Heffman	Lester Heffman	Nell Heffman	Male (name unknown) Henrickson Child

style="border-spacing: 2px; border: 1px solid darkgray;" Key

plural marriage
traditional or legal marriage
former marriage
offspring

== Episodes ==
Season	Episodes	Originally released	
Season	Episodes	First released	Last released
1	12	March 12, 2006	June 4, 2006
2	12	June 11, 2007	August 26, 2007
3	10	January 18, 2009	March 22, 2009
4	9	January 10, 2010	March 7, 2010
5	10	January 16, 2011	March 20, 2011

=== Season 1 ===
In Sandy, Utah, fundamentalist Mormon Bill Henrickson practices a polygamous marriage with his three wives: Barbara "Barb", Nicolette "Nicki", and Margene "Margie". Bill owns and operates Home Plus, a local hardware-store chain which earns the family considerable income and allows him to support his wives and their seven children. Tensions rise within the family amid the wives with the newly-introduced Margene "Margie", an employee at Bill's store and the family's former babysitter—as well as between Bill and Roman Grant, Nicolette's father, who is an influential patriarch and prophet of Juniper Creek, the fundamentalist compound where Nicolette and Bill were raised. Meanwhile, Bill and Barb's eldest children, Ben and Sarah, individually deal with maintaining a façade to conceal their parents' polygamous marriage from their peers and community.

Barb seeks independence by taking a job as a schoolteacher, while Nicki, a compulsive shopper, incurs nearly $60,000 in credit card debt, and Margie struggles to find footing in the family. Bill and his associate Don Embry, also a polygamist, continue to dispute with Roman over business holdings in Home Plus. Roman is aided by his sociopathic teenage bride Rhonda Volmer, as well as his son (Nicolette's older brother) Alby, a closeted homosexual and ardent follower of the United Effort Brotherhood (UEB), the priesthood of Juniper Creek. Bill, who was shunned from Juniper Creek as a teenager, is devastated when he discovers that his shunning was not caused by his parents, Frank and Lois, but by Roman, who feared that Bill would usurp the prophecy.

After deciding to follow through with her baptism, Margie discovers she is pregnant. Shortly after, Barb is awarded the title of "Mother of the Year" by the local government after daughter Teeny nominates her. Flattered, Barb goes to attend the award ceremony at the governor's mansion, but is disqualified before the crowd when the judges are informed that she is a polygamist.

=== Season 2 ===
After the family's exposure, Barb goes into seclusion, and Margie suspects their neighbors, Pam and Carl, were responsible. Home Plus billboards are vandalized, and the tumult within the house results in Bill and Barb forgetting Nicki's anniversary, exacerbating tensions. Barb decides to begin taking classes at the University of Utah to earn a Master's degree. At Juniper Creek, Bill's sister-in-law, Wanda, is tried by the community for attempting to poison Alby to death; Bill's brother Joey, a former NFL player, turns himself in to the police to prevent Wanda from facing prison.

Sarah joins an ex-Mormon support group to voice her frustrations over her family life, and meets Scott, a twenty-something-year-old whom she begins dating. Rhonda escapes Juniper Creek and manipulates her way into staying with Sarah's friend and co-worker, Heather; she then begins manipulating and blackmailing Heather and her family in order to help forge a career as a singer. Wanda is released from a psychiatric institution after Alby's poisoning, and Lois attempts to persuade Joey to take a second wife: Kathy. Meanwhile, Nicki enrolls son Wayne in a Catholic school and grows paranoid that he will be indoctrinated, while Bill develops an attraction to Ana, a Serbian immigrant who works at a local diner; Margie uncovers this and forges a friendship with Ana unbeknownst to Bill. At home, teenage Ben confesses to Bill and Barb that he is having sex with his irreligious girlfriend Bryn and expresses interest in practicing polygamy himself.

Meanwhile, Bill begins a business venture with Weber Gaming, a casino that operates on virtual currency, and is caught in the crossfires of a dispute between the Grant family and the Greenes, an underground polygamist family. Roman is ambushed by the Greenes and critically injured, leaving him hospitalized at the compound; Alby assumes the role of the compound leader and, with the help of wife Lura, extends Roman's convalescence by keeping him sedated. Joey begins to court Kathy, and Nicki holds a party for him, Kathy, and Wanda at their home. Meanwhile, Barb reunites with her estranged mother Nancy and sister Cindy on the occasion of Nancy's remarriage. Adaleen realizes that Alby has been sedating Roman, and brings Roman to Bill's home, seeking safety. Barb and Margie confess to neighbor Pam that they are polygamists.

=== Season 3 ===
After Margie gives birth to Nell, Bill begins dating Ana formally. Roman is indicted on charges of rape and child sex abuse based on claims made by Alby, who is seeking to take his place. Posing as Margie, Nicki takes a job at the district attorney's office to help pay off her credit card debts, meanwhile seeking the state's evidence against her father. While cruising for sex at a rest stop, Alby is attacked by a stranger, and suspects Bill has put a hit on him, but it is revealed to be Adaleen, attempting to dissuade him of his same-sex attractions. Barb becomes concerned that her cervical cancer, treated with a hysterectomy years prior, may have recurred, but test results determine she is still in remission. Bill takes in his younger half-brother, Frankie, who has been kicked out of Juniper Creek, and it is revealed that Nicki has been on birth control for several years; meanwhile, Sarah discovers she is pregnant with Scott's child. Margie's alcoholic mother, Ginger, dies in an accident. Meanwhile, Bill pursues a business venture with Jerry Flute, a member of the Blackfoot tribe, on a casino.

Adaleen bribes Rhonda with $30,000 if she refuses to testify against Roman, and Rhonda takes the money and flees to Los Angeles. Roman is acquitted of the charges. Bill marries Ana, but it is short-lived, as she divorces the family within a matter of days. The family make a cross-country pilgrimage to Cumorah, New York, visiting historical sites associated with Mormon pioneers en route. During the trip, Ginger's ashes are lost, and Barb finds Nicki's birth control pills, which she assumes are Sarah's. Nicki confesses they are hers. That night, Sarah suffers a miscarriage.

Nicki is persuaded to keep her job at the D.A.'s office by Ray, her boss who has a crush on her, but quits when Margie discovers she's using her identity. Sarah and Heather make plans to enroll at Arizona State University, but Sarah eventually backs out. Roman attempts to marry Kathy to Hollis Greene as punishment for her testifying against him. Roman chases her when she flees, and she dies in a car accident while trying to escape. After her death, Bill attempts to get the D.A. to charge Roman with murder. Bill seeks a document legitimizing polygamy in the LDS church from Cindy and Ted. In an investigation into the letter, Barb becomes formally excommunicated from the LDS church.

Lois and Frank attempt to rekindle their tumultuous marriage after Lois's extensive attempts to murder him. Nicki develops romantic feelings for Ray, but he inadvertently discovers she is Roman's daughter, and is married to Bill. Enraged over her dishonesty, Ray threatens to charge Nicki with obstruction of justice, and she goes to stay at the compound. She returns home to mend her marriage with Bill.

=== Season 4 ===
Roman disappears, and the D.A. attempts to dismantle Juniper Creek. Fearing a witch-hunt, Bill decides to run for office against a stark anti-polygamy candidate as an open polygamist. Nicki takes in Cara Lynn, her daughter from a previous arranged marriage on the compound who has been raised by her father, J.J. (brother of Wanda) in Kansas. Alby begins a romantic relationship with Dale, a married attorney negotiating with Juniper Creek on behalf of the state. Sarah is married to Scott by Bill, and reunites with Heather. Adaleen invites Nicki to the compound where she reveals Roman's corpse, which she's been keeping in a meat freezer; Nicki urges her to inform the authorities. Joey and Nicki believe Bill is to be the next prophet of the compound.

Margie begins a jewelry business sold via televised shopping. On the compound, Lois, Ben, and Kathy's sister JoDean begin an illicit business selling exotic birds smuggled from Mexico. Bill, Nicki, and Cara Lynn travel to Washington, D.C. where Bill attempts to get a land endorsement; there, he is met with the ire of Marilyn Densham, a venal lobbyist. Meanwhile, Barb takes over duties at the casino. Marilyn comes to Salt Lake City during the primaries and tries to forge a working relationship with Bill based on his business ventures, and both Margie and Ben are ostracized when it is revealed they have romantic feelings toward one another; Ben flees to the compound and joins Lois, Frank, and JoDean. Frank crashes a political party at Bill's casino, and Bill receives news he has won the nomination.

Bill and the wives find Ana working at an upscale restaurant and discover she is pregnant with Bill's child. Alby's feelings for Dale deepen and he rents an apartment for them to meet in; Lura discovers their affair and informs Dale's wife, leading Dale to commit suicide in the apartment. The Greenes kidnap Lois, Frank, and Ben in Mexico. Meanwhile, Sarah moves with Scott to Portland, Oregon, against Nicki and Barb's wishes. Bill arrives in Mexico to save Lois, Frank, and Ben from execution; Lois attacks Hollis with a machete, cutting off his arm. They drive him to a hospital to save him under the condition that Ben, Frank, and Lois are freed. Bill returns home safely with Ben. Barb discovers that Marilyn is in cahoots with the casino's opposition, leading Bill to confront and fire her. Nicki discovers she is infertile, and Margie marries Goran, Ana's new boyfriend, to prevent him from being deported.

On election day, Bill and Barb dispute over Bill's handling of a drug deal within the casino, and Marilyn discovers Bill is a polygamist. J.J. has a doctor lure Nicki to the compound, claiming she is pregnant. Wanda informs Bill that J.J. has impregnated Adaleen with her and J.J.'s child, and that Nicki is being tricked into having Cara Lynn's egg implanted into her. Adaleen breaks free and interrupts the procedure, and Nicki stabs J.J. with surgical scissors. That evening, Adaleen burns down the compound clinic with J.J. and his wife inside, killing them. Bill wins the election, and announces during a press interview that he is a polygamist, inviting each of the wives onstage.

=== Season 5 ===
After his election, Bill establishes his own church in Sandy, and seeks to reform the Juniper Creek compound and dismantle the UEB against Alby's wishes. Meanwhile, he faces the ire of local government and the public. An open house invitation hosted by Bill and the wives is coldly received, though a group of fellow polygamists arrive at the end of the night. Barb and mother Nancy join a group focusing on Mormon mother-daughter relationships, and Barb comes to believe she possesses the priesthood, which Bill and Nicki vehemently challenge; Barb begins drinking alcohol, which also stuns the family. On Christmas Eve, Margie reveals that she was in fact sixteen when she married Bill, and had concealed her true age. Heather, who attended the holiday dinner with Ben, inadvertently tells her bishop when she returns to college. The bishop being a mandated reporter reports the situation to the police and ultimately Heather's father. Heather's father, in turn, launches an investigation against Bill for statutory rape. Lois is diagnosed with dementia due to an untreated STI and Bill moves her into their home.

Nicki struggles to tell Cara Lynn that her father is dead, and Adaleen reveals she has been impregnated with Cara Lynn and J.J.'s incestuous child. Alby begins a mission to "purify" the compound, leading his wife, Lura, to leave him. Meanwhile, Cara Lynn begins an illicit relationship with her math teacher, Greg, which Margie and Nicki uncover. Rhonda returns to Sandy with her new husband, Verlan, and their infant child. The two attempt to extort money from Alby for the past abuses Rhonda suffered at the hands of Roman, and Verlan begins offering sexual favors to Alby in exchange for money. In an effort to legally adopt Cara Lynn, Nicki requests that Barb formally divorce Bill in order for her and Bill to legally adopt her. Barb reluctantly agrees. Pam confides in Margie that she and Carl may be divorcing.

While ice fishing with his sons, Don is attacked by a masked stranger and nearly dies; it is later revealed to be Verlan, working on behalf of Alby. Nicki decides to devote her time rescuing women from the compound. During a confrontation, Alby kidnaps Nicki and brings her to a secluded location to murder her. Nicki begs for her life, and he instead shoots Verlan to death, sparing Nicki. The wives prepare for the possibility that Bill may be indicted, and Bill is infuriated when he discovers Barb has been attending a reform-LDS church.

Alby attempts to assassinate Bill at the state capitol, but his attempt is thwarted and Alby is imprisoned. As Bill's potential trial looms, Barb decides to join the reform-LDS church, and Margie considers making a mission to South America, leaving Nicki fearful she will be left alone. Meanwhile, Lois's dementia worsens significantly, and she is placed in an assisted living home. Bill proposes the legalization of polygamy in an effort to prevent the covert abuses that have occurred in compounds like Juniper Creek. Bill and Don lose ownership of Home Plus amidst the scandal. Barb is ultimately unable to follow through with her baptism, and instead joins the family at the church where Bill gives an emotional Easter sermon.

While the Henricksons prepare for Easter dinner, Frank helps Lois commit assisted suicide, recounting their life together while she dies in his arms. In his driveway, Bill is confronted by a mentally-ill Carl, who is infuriated over Bill's kind gesture of re-sodding his and Pam's front lawn. Carl shoots Bill in the chest. Barb, Nicki, and Margie rush to his aid, and at Bill's request Barb performs a blessing over him as he bleeds to death on the ground.

Eleven months later, Sarah returns home with Scott and her newborn son, who they've named after Bill for a blessing by Barb. As Sarah and Scott prepare to fly back to Oregon, Margie also prepares to leave on her mission to South America. The wives emotionally embrace as Bill watches from the dining table.

== Music ==
The series' theme song for its first three seasons was "God Only Knows" by The Beach Boys. For the series' fourth and fifth seasons, the song "Home", performed by the British band Engineers, was adopted as the show's theme song along with a new title sequence. "God Only Knows" was covered by Natalie Maines for the closing of the series finale.

David Byrne recorded a complete soundtrack to the second season, released as Big Love: Hymnal on August 19, 2008.

== Home media ==
=== DVD releases ===
DVD name	Region 1	Region 2	Region 4
Season 1	October 17, 2006	April 27, 2007	September 5, 2007
Season 2	December 11, 2007	September 12, 2011	July 2, 2008
Season 3	January 5, 2010	January 23, 2012	March 3, 2010
Season 4	January 4, 2011	April 16, 2012	May 4, 2011
Season 5	December 6, 2011	August 6, 2012	July 11, 2012
Big Love: The Complete Collection	December 6, 2011	August 6, 2012	TBA

== Reception ==
=== Critical opinion ===
Review aggregate Metacritic indicated positive critical response for all five seasons. The average scores for the first through fourth seasons were 72/100, 71/100, 79/100, and 70/100, indicating "generally favorable reviews". The fifth and final season received an average score of 85/100, or "universal acclaim". Based on its overall Metacritic score of 75, Business Insider ranked the series at number 29 in its 2017 list of every HBO series ranked "from best to worst".

Upon its debut, reaction to the series was mixed-to-positive. Initial raves came from publications such as Time magazine, The Wall Street Journal, and New York Daily News. James Poniewozik described it as a "first-rate drama" and Dorothy Rabinowitz said it was "seriously compelling". Publications such as Entertainment Weekly, The New Yorker, Variety, the Boston Globe, and The Hollywood Reporter were all positive as well. Notable detractors included Robert Lloyd of the Los Angeles Times, who said it ultimately "didn't convince"; Doug Elfman of the Chicago Sun-Times, who felt its quality didn't match its concept; and John Leonard of New York magazine, describing it as "more soapy than salacious".

By the second season, critical reception warmed. Maureen Ryan of The Huffington Post and noted critic Alan Sepinwall remained ambivalent towards the show; otherwise critics were uniformly positive. In particular, several critics noted improvements from season one. Gillian Flynn of Entertainment Weekly wrote, "Big Love has dropped the last vestiges of its ostentatious quirkiness and fashioned itself into a rich and grounded family drama", and Diane Werts of Newsday said that "'Big Love' does more this year than you might expect, and more richly, more provocatively, more dramatically and amusingly, too." The second season was cited among the best shows of 2007 by numerous publications, including PopMatters, the San Francisco Chronicle, Time, Entertainment Weekly and NPR.

Season three vaulted Big Love to universal critical acclaim. Notably, Tim Stack of Entertainment Weekly gave the season's early episodes an 'A' grade, and Mary McNamara of the Los Angeles Times said, "If there's a better written, better acted, more originally conceived show on television, I defy you to name it." After two years of popping up spottily on critics' 'Best Of' lists, season three was recognized as one of the top seasons of television from 2009. In aggregating Top 10 lists from every major television critic, Metacritic reported that 10 critics had cited the series, tying for the eighth-most mentions (and, in particular, Big Love ranked third on that list among series in their third season or later).

Though only its first three seasons aired in the 2000s (decade), multiple critics cited Big Love as one of the best series of the decade. They include the Huffington Post, Ain't It Cool News and The A.V. Club, who wrote "Big Love has proved to be one of the most ... earnest studies of religion and morality ever to air on television."

Returning in 2010, Big Love was met with mixed critical response for a shorter fourth season. General consensus dictated that the series was focused too much on plot, with character development suffering as a result. The Washington Post identified a lack of energy in the actors, looking "alternately confused and pooped, empty shells of the characters they used to play". Putting it into perspective, Rob Owen of the Pittsburgh Post-Gazette wrote, "In this new season the show is spinning off into too many directions. None, taken individually, is terrible, but altogether these myriad plots create a lack of focus." The A.V. Club, which a year earlier had cited the drama as one of the previous decade's top 20 shows, described the fourth season after its finale as "The season that virtually obliterated Big Love's dramatic credibility."

When the series returned for its fifth and final season the next year, critical reaction was extremely enthusiastic. Big Love received the best early reviews of its entire run. Mary McNamara wrote, "Big Love quickly reclaims its astonishing ability to balance the insightful and the absurd, hilarity and heartbreak and the personal with the political." Similar raves came from Nancy DeWolf Smith of The Wall Street Journal, who said the final season was "mesmerizing", and the New York Post, which awarded the final season a perfect four out of four stars. Overall, the final season of Big Love tied as the fourth-best reviewed returning show of 2011, trailing only Breaking Bad, Louie and the animated comedy Archer. It was the tenth-best reviewed scripted series of the year overall.

Response to the series finale, "When Men and Mountains Meet", was passionate among top publications. Jace Lacob of the Daily Beast called it the "perfect way to close out this series" and described his reaction to it as "emotional". James Poniewozik wrote for Time magazine that "In the end ... Big Love came back full circle to the core relationships ... We closed on a moving if messy note for a moving if messy series." Mary McNamara, of the Los Angeles Times dubbed it "a perfect finish to an astonishingly ambitious show that often careened through genre, narrative structure and believability like they were false walls on a stage". In her rumination on the finale, Ginia Bellafante of The New York Times noted that Big Love "was always at its most compelling as an indictment of the mindless spiritual avidity and the bizarre displays of self-exoneration that can go on in the name of faith", and celebrated the finale for committing to that theme. She also wrote that the series had "achieved the resonance of [HBO's] other heralded series." Writing for TV Squad, Dr. Ryan Vaughn was less enthusiastic about the finale but said, "I'm not going to let a great series be sullied with a mediocre finale." Finally, Emily St. James of The A.V. Club awarded the series finale, and the series as a whole, a B+, writing that its first three seasons in particular qualified as "remarkable television".

=== LDS Church and others ===
In March 2006, The Church of Jesus Christ of Latter-day Saints (LDS Church), which ended practice of polygamy in 1890 and often distances itself from modern polygamist breakoffs, issued a public statement citing concerns over the program's depiction of abuse, polygamy, use of stereotypes, and television's depiction of moral and civic values in general. Among other things, the church stated, "Despite its popularity with some, much of today's television entertainment shows an unhealthy preoccupation with sex, coarse humor and foul language. Big Love, like so much other television programming, is essentially lazy and indulgent entertainment that does nothing for our society and will never nourish great minds." In March 2009, the LDS Church stated that HBO's writers, producers, and executives were displaying insensitivity to church members by choosing to display simulated segments of the LDS Church's Endowment ceremony in an episode of Big Love. Independent of the church's statement, some members of the LDS Church called for a boycott for ceremony depiction. HBO made a public apology to those offended by the depiction but defended a decision to broadcast it anyway. The network stated the depiction was accurate and done with reverence. The LDS Church also stated that the show had continued to blur the distinction between the LDS Church and "the show's fictional non-Mormon characters".

In contrast to the statement made by the LDS church, several real fundamentalist Mormon polygamists spoke in favor of the series: In a 2006 interview in The New York Times with various polygamist wives, one noted: "It's a more realistic view of a polygamous family that lives out in society than people have known. It can be seen as a viable alternative lifestyle between consenting adults."

=== Academic assessment ===
Since its premiere, Big Love has been the subject of several studies in the humanities and social sciences.

Dr. Cheryl Hanna explored "the problem of categorical exclusions to the consent doctrine in private intimate relationships" through the lens of Big Love, specifically citing its "beautifully explored" tensions between individual autonomy and state interests. In her conclusion, she wrote "the future of feminist legal theory depends on its ability to remain ambivalent about the tensions presented in the consent doctrine as applied to contexts such as polygamy, prostitution, sadomasochistic sex, obscenity, and domestic violence. Big Love seeks to persuade us to accept ambivalence and to be open to changing our minds because of the complicated nature of women's (and men's) lives; feminist legal theory ought to persuade us to do the same."

For the Columbia Law Review, Dr. Adrienne D. Davis assessed legal debates surrounding polygamy after the premiere of Big Love and how it was being likened to same-sex marriage. She wrote, "The highly acclaimed hit series self-consciously invites viewers to consider analogies between same-sex and polygamous families. In the show's much-anticipated second season, the invitation became more pointed and persistent, with intermittent references to 'coming out,' 'closeted families,' and 'the state' as repressively surveilling nonconforming 'big love.'" However, she claimed that Hollywood and television critics' desire to interpret the polygamy in Big Love and beyond as representative of American "quirky families" was a miscue. Ultimately, she argues that the dichotomy presented by Big Love works when viewed in terms of "intimacy liberty, privacy, autonomy, and agency, or even an incipient constitutional respect for 'sexual minorities.'"; the very essence, as Davis notes and commends, of the series' themes.

Dr. Brenda Cossman examined Big Love closely in her study of "migrating marriages" for Law and Contemporary Problems. In addition to asserting that "Just as in Big Love, same-sex marriage is never more than one degree away of separation from polygamy", she found that the series adds crucial insight to the understanding of marriages that exist between legal and cultural recognition. As she explains, "These cases can be seen through the lens of ... Big Love, in which marriages are produced as the culturally real in the here and the now, even when legal recognition remains elusive." By exploring the movement seeking to culturally legitimize same-sex marriage, she concluded Big Love served as a most powerful, unique allegory: "Big Love plays on an even more decisive gap: polygamous marriages are not legal in Utah or anywhere else in the country. Yet the point and the poignancy of the show is to depict a 'real-life' family. Bill Hendrickson and his three wives struggle with all of the daily trials of contemporary family life: parenting, finances, intimacy, and sex. The sympathetic portrayal of their family is as culturally real, although it suffers by virtue of its nonlegal recognition."

Big Love was also studied as a part of Andrew Atkinson's study of HBO programs and the post-secular humanistic themes they elicit. In writing of Big Love, Atkinson too draws on the parallel between gay rights and polygamist rights illuminated by the series, but focuses more on the series' influential humanistic elements. In fact, he somewhat rebuffs earlier assertions made: "The attention that is paid to the minute details of Mormon ritual, theology, and historical disputes demonstrates that HBO's writers are uncomfortable with the supposed dichotomy that constructs homosexuality as by default areligious." Atkinson focuses on the ending, interpreting Barb's blessing of Bill as a "ritual innovation [that] indicates that FLDS Mormonism must shed the trappings of patriarchy if it wants to legitimate polygamy in a post-feminist society", and the fall of Alby, the closet homosexual, as a powerful interpretation of "the future theo-political and sexual tensions that Mormonism, and by extension, the broader American polity, will face as the post-secular matures". In concluding, Atkinson makes the case that Big Love and other HBO shows like The Sopranos, The Wire and Six Feet Under "contribute to a fuller conception of humanity" than other forms of art and entertainment.

== Awards and nominations ==
Series

- Primetime Emmy Award for Outstanding Drama Series - nominated
- Golden Globe Award for Best Television Series - Drama - nominated
- Television Critics Association Award for Best New Program - nominated
- AFI Award Top Television Program - co-winner

Acting

- Bill Paxton for the Golden Globe Award for Best Actor - Television Series Drama - nominated
- Chloë Sevigny for the Golden Globe Award for Best Supporting Actress - Series, Miniseries or Television Film - win
- Ellen Burstyn for the Primetime Emmy Award for Outstanding Guest Actress in a Drama Series - nominated, for season two
- Sissy Spacek for the Primetime Emmy Award for Outstanding Guest Actress in a Drama Series - nominated, for season four
- Mary Kay Place for the Primetime Emmy Award for Outstanding Guest Actress in a Drama Series - nominated, for season four
- Bruce Dern for the Primetime Emmy Award for Outstanding Guest Actor in a Drama Series - nominated, for season five

Directing

- Rodrigo García for the Primetime Emmy Award for Outstanding Directing for a Drama Series - nominated for the pilot

Writing

- Mark V. Olsen & Will Scheffer for the Writers Guild of America Award for Television: Episodic Drama - win for the pilot
- Melanie Marnich for the Writers Guild of America Award for Television: Episodic Drama - nominated for the episode "Come, Ye Saints".

== See also ==
- Portrayals of Mormons in popular media
