= List of Big Love episodes =

Big Love, an American drama television series created by Mark V. Olsen and Will Scheffer, premiered on HBO on March 12, 2006. The series revolves around Bill Henrickson (Bill Paxton), a polygamist living in Sandy, Utah with his three wives, Barb (Jeanne Tripplehorn), Nicki (Chloë Sevigny) and Margene (Ginnifer Goodwin) and their children. Bill struggles to maintain a happy family life whilst keeping their illegal lifestyle a secret. During the course of the series, 53 episodes of Big Love aired over five seasons, between March 12, 2006, and March 20, 2011.

== Series overview ==
Season	Episodes	Originally released	
Season	Episodes	First released	Last released
1	12	March 12, 2006	June 4, 2006
2	12	June 11, 2007	August 26, 2007
3	10	January 18, 2009	March 22, 2009
4	9	January 10, 2010	March 7, 2010
5	10	January 16, 2011	March 20, 2011

== Episodes ==
=== Season 1 (2006) ===
No. overall	No. in season	Title	Directed by	Written by	Original release date	U.S. viewers (millions)
1	1	"Pilot"	Rodrigo García	Mark V. Olsen & Will Scheffer	March 12, 2006	4.56
Polygamist Bill Henrickson tries to satisfy the emotional, romantic, and financial needs of his three wives – Barb, Nicki and Margene — and seven children in suburban Salt Lake City. Bill, a successful businessman launching his second "Home Plus" hardware superstore, hits a roadblock in the person of Roman Grant, the powerful patriarch of the Juniper Creek polygamist commune and father of Nicki, Bill's shopaholic second wife. Also, his estranged brother Joey, a retired football star, calls Bill saying that their father Frank is ill at the home of their mother Lois, Frank's second wife.
2	2	"Viagra Blue"	Charles McDougall	Mark V. Olsen & Will Scheffer	March 19, 2006	3.40
Nicki scolds Bill for disrespecting Barbara by spending time with Margie on Barbara's "day". Worried about Roman's threats, Bill looks into installing a security system at his homes. Frank's hospital convalescence ends after a visit from Roman and a quarrel with Bill which reveals that Frank kicked Bill out of his home when he was 14. Bill's business associate Don Embry, also a polygamist, comes to dinner with his three wives and confides to Bill his expansion plans. Marge presses Bill to give her a car of her own. Sarah forges a new friendship with Heather, a member of LDS. Bill compensates for rising demands at home with Viagra.
3	3	"Home Invasion"	Charles McDougall	Mark V. Olsen & Will Scheffer	March 26, 2006	3.70
Despite her spending being out of control with several cards being maxed out, Nicki tries to throw an extravagant birthday party at a hotel resort for her 5-year-old son Wayne, but she's finally forced to host the party at home, bringing unwanted attention with her large guest list, including her father Roman and many relatives from the compound. Meanwhile, Bill installs a "perimeter of defense" around his home; Barb tries to keep the family's secret hidden from their neighbors; Margene stands up for herself; and Home Plus gets an unwanted visitor.
4	4	"Eclipse"	Michael Spiller	Story by : David Manson; Teleplay by : David Manson and Mark V. Olsen & Will Scheffer	April 2, 2006	3.5
Bill seeks "clarity" after experiencing some unsettling dreams. Later, on a hunting trip with Ben, he gets the answer for which he's been searching. Barb gets a long-term teaching job, putting added pressure on Nicki and Margene back home. Nicki fends off her creditors (barely, but continues to shop on the way home from visiting her father in an emergency meeting about her finances. Joey pays Bill a visit with some revealing news about Roman; Margene has trouble with the new alarm systems when babysitting the other houses and is forced to make the alarm-system attendant drive everyone around town; Heather bails Sarah out of a bad party; and Teenie bangs away the dragons during a lunar eclipse.
5	5	"Affair"	Alan Taylor	Story by : Alexa Junge; Teleplay by : Alexa Junge and Mark V. Olsen & Will Scheffer	April 9, 2006	4.20
Bill and Barb's behavior arouses Nicki's suspicions. Meanwhile, Bill and Don get dirt on Roman after placing an anonymous call to the attorney general's "Polygamy Czar"; a Home Plus employee comes forward with an unsettling accusation; Roman searches for Bill's audited numbers, exposing Alby's limitations and inciting his ire; Margene embraces the friendship of her neighbor Pam, raising concerns from the other wives; and Nicki makes a happy announcement to the family.
6	6	"Roberta's Funeral"	Mary Harron	Eileen Myers	April 16, 2006	3.94
Bill heads to Juniper Creek to attend the funeral of his father Frank's first wife Roberta, and to make Roman a settlement proposal he might or might not be able to refuse; Lois sees Roberta's demise as an opportunity to rise to First Wife; Barb bails Nicki out of a jam at Home Plus; and Ben ponders whether he has what it takes to follow in his father's footsteps.
7	7	"Eviction"	Michael Spiller	Mimi Friedman & Jeanette Collins	April 23, 2006	4.24
Despite his ongoing feud with Roman, Bill considers launching an expensive new marketing campaign for Home Plus. Nicki wards off the advances of a pair of persistent missionaries. Margene is invited to a recital at Pam's church. Ben gets in a minor accident on a road trip with some fellow Seminary students. After being excused from the Henrickson case, Alby invites a homosexual stranger to a hotel room but gets cold feet. Sarah brings home co-worker Heather Tuttle. After bailing out Nicki at Home Plus in the last episode, Peg Embry reveals Nicki's credit problems to Barb. Roman evicts Bill's mother, brother, and sister-in-law. Alby is caught breaking into Home Plus.
8	8	"Easter"	Steve Shill	Mark V. Olsen & Will Scheffer	April 30, 2006	4.03
Having been evicted from their temporary lodgings, Frank and his wives and dog descend on Bill's residence just in time for Easter, as does Joey, who's looking for a fresh start. Meanwhile, Bill finds himself drowning in lawsuits; Nicki learns she's not alone in debt; Sarah unexpectedly bonds with Lois; and Bill surprises Roman with a final settlement offer.
9	9	"A Barbecue for Betty"	Julian Farino	Story by : Jill Sprecher & Karen Sprecher; Teleplay by : Jill Sprecher & Karen Sprecher and Mark V. Olsen & Will Scheffer	May 7, 2006	4.04
Bill celebrates being "free and clear" from Roman, but the prophet makes a surprise visit to the store after a thunderstorm puts a hole in the store's ceiling; Nicki tells Bill about her credit-card debt; Don falls hard for Betty, a potential fourth wife; Bill is angry at Sarah after Heather Tuttle's father, a state trooper, stops by the house; Margene finds out that Nicki initially voted against Bill marrying her, and later she's surprised when her friend Pam arranges a blind date for her. The land for the third store is possibly an ancient burial ground and may be in litigation for years. Nicki reveals to Bill that it was Roman, not Bill's father, who kicked Bill out of the compound, because Roman was afraid that Bill would become the next prophet.
10	10	"The Baptism"	Michael Lehmann	Dustin Lance Black	May 14, 2006	3.80
Barb gets an unwanted visit from her sister Cindy, who strongly disapproves of the family's polygamist lifestyle. Meanwhile, Bill attempts to infiltrate the UEB Priesthood Council as his feud with Roman intensifies; Ben loses his virginity to his girlfriend Brynn; and depressed Margene botches her chores, ends her friendship with Pam, and is transformed at Teeny's baptism, making the decision to get baptized herself.
11	11	"Where There's a Will"	Alan Poul	Story by : Eileen Myers; Teleplay by : Mimi Friedman & Jeanette Collins	May 21, 2006	4.10
Barb finds herself a finalist for Mother of the Year. Bill is asked to become the newest member of the Salt Lake City Leadership League, which he eventually turns down. The wives mull over custody scenarios in their separate wills. Rhonda arrives from Juniper Creek for spring break, prompting sympathy from Sarah and Heather. Ernest Holloway, a polygamist in the compound, goes into exile after Roman finds out that he is helping Bill. Margene announces she is pregnant.
12	12	"The Ceremony"	Julian Farino	Mark V. Olsen & Will Scheffer	June 4, 2006	4.55
Bill and Joey blindside Roman at a UEB Priesthood Council meeting when they take Ernest Holloway's seat. Wanda poisons Alby with antifreeze during his visit to her home. Joey reveals that Wanda had also poisoned Bill's dad, Frank Harlow. After Barb offers to have Rhonda stay at their home, Roman's wife Adaleen puts an abrupt end to Rhonda's thespian sabbatical in Salt Lake City. Barb attends the Mother of the Year award ceremony at the governor's mansion despite Nicki's initial dismay, but she is disqualified at the last minute when the judges are informed that she is a polygamist.

=== Season 2 (2007) ===
No. overall	No. in season	Title	Directed by	Written by	Original release date	U.S. viewers (millions)
13	1	"Damage Control"	Daniel Minahan	Mark V. Olsen & Will Scheffer	June 11, 2007	2.21
After Barb's outing at the governor's mansion, she retreats into seclusion, leaving Nicki and Margene with added responsibilities. Bill tries to find out who is responsible for Barb's humiliation and narrows it down to his assistant Wendy and neighbors Carl and Pam. Wanda faces questioning at Juniper Creek after Alby's poisoning.
14	2	"The Writing on the Wall"	Sarah Pia Anderson	Mark V. Olsen & Will Scheffer	June 18, 2007	1.53
Home Plus billboards are vandalized, and Bill and Don quickly try to replace them. Bill and Barb forget Nicki's anniversary, causing an upset throughout the houses. Ben tells his girlfriend about his family. Joey turns himself in to the authorities so that Wanda does not go to prison.
15	3	"Reunion"	Alan Poul	Dustin Lance Black	June 25, 2007	1.66
Bill and Nicki attend a Grant family reunion at Juniper Creek hoping to repair ties with Roman; Alby reveals that it was Roman who outed Barb at the governor's mansion; Rhonda is forced to vow herself to Roman, but she then escapes the compound by stowing away in Bill and Nicki's trunk; Margene calls Barb's sister Cindy, who meets her with animosity.
16	4	"Rock and a Hard Place"	Adam Davidson	Jeanette Collins & Mimi Friedman	July 2, 2007	1.63
Rhonda vows not to return to the compound and blackmails Nicki into letting her stay at the Henricksons'. Bill is wowed by a new business venture and wishes to invest in it as an insurance police for his family. Authorities from Juniper Creek search Bill's homes hoping to find Rhonda. Nicki is banned from Juniper Creek after accusing her father of outing Barb.
17	5	"Vision Thing"	Burr Steers	Eileen Myers	July 9, 2007	1.86
Bill finds himself attracted to Ana, a waitress at a local diner. Meanwhile, Nicki is upset that Wayne is being taught Catholicism at his parochial school; Joey meets a potential new wife, Kathy, who has been caring for him and the baby; Bill asks his uncle Eddie for a loan so that he can bid on Weber Gaming; Rhonda pays a surprise visit to Sarah at Deb's and asks the Tuttles to take her in.
18	6	"Dating Game"	Jim McKay	Doug Jung	July 16, 2007	1.92
Bill discovers that an underground polygamist family, the Greenes, have returned to Utah to pressure him to give up Weber Gaming. Meanwhile Bill has been secretly dating Ana, the waitress who he believes may have potential to be a fourth wife; Margene purposely befriends Ana and has her oblivious sister-wives meet her; Don is reluctant to give the gambling venture his blessing.
19	7	"Good Guys and Bad Guys"	Michael Lehmann	Mark V. Olsen & Will Scheffer	July 23, 2007	1.87
Margene's mother visits, not knowing that Margie and Bill are polygamists; Barb picks up Wanda from the mental institution to relieve Joey of some stress; Sarah's boyfriend tells Bill that Alby has been stalking them on their dates; Roman calls an emergency UEB meeting about the Greenes; Frank resurfaces and wants a percentage of Lois and Eddie's new business.
20	8	"Kingdom Come"	Dan Attias	Dustin Lance Black	July 30, 2007	2.02
An exhausted Bill wishes to take a night for himself every seventh day. Barb urges the other wives to boycott Bill's suggestion by giving him the cold shoulder. Frank discovers where Lois has been keeping her laundromat money and how Eddie obtained the mone; Bill makes Ben a priesthood holder after he fears that he is becoming a "sexual deviant" and reveals his true feelings about polygamy; Bill remains in a crossfire between the Greenes and Roman over Weber Gaming in the hopes that Roman will defeat them, but Roman is later ambushed by the Greenes while departing from a coffee shop.
21	9	"Circle the Wagons"	John Strickland	Story by : Jennifer Schuur & Doug Stockstill; Teleplay by : Doug Jung	August 6, 2007	N/A
Bill wants Nicki to try to persuade Barb and Margene to vote to keep Weber Gaming, with predictable results. Juniper Creek goes into a panic after Roman's incident with the Greenes; at a testimony meeting, the people choose Alby as their temporary leader; Lois tries to make amends with Bill after her laundromat business fails; Nicki tries to win her mother back over with a refrigerator so that she can see her father; Ben becomes defensive when a Home Plus co-worker says something inappropriate about Margene.
22	10	"The Happiest Girl"	Tom Vaughan	Story by : Doug Stockstill & Jennifer Schuur; Teleplay by : Jeanette Collins & Mimi Friedman and Mark V. Olsen & Will Scheffer	August 13, 2007	N/A
Bill asks Margene to accompany him to a convention in Nevada. After a welcoming party for Joey's future wife Kathy goes sour, Nicki plans to throw a party for them at her home, much to Alby's chagrin. Rhonda blackmails Heather and Sarah into attending her taping of a television news program; Bill outs Margene as his wife (in addition to Barb) to his business partners; Lois wants a divorce from Frank.
23	11	"Take Me As I Am"	Jim McKay	Eileen Myers	August 19, 2007	2.34
Barb reunites with her estranged mother, who is remarrying, and after learning that Ben is dating twins from the compound, she asks her mother if Ben can spend summer vacation with her (but doesn't inform Bill first). Bill makes Alby a proposition regarding Weber Gaming.
24	12	"Oh, Pioneers"	Julian Farino	Dustin Lance Black & Eileen Myers and Mark V. Olsen & Will Scheffer	August 26, 2007	2.88
During Salt Lake City Pioneer Week, Bill devises a plan to fight off his enemies on the UEB by electing a new chairman. After discovering that Alby and his wife have been sedating Roman, Adaleen rushes him to the Henricksons' for refuge. Pam asks Margene to be surrogate mother for her and her husband; Sarah and Heather try to convince Ben not to become a polygamist; Margene comes clean to Ana about her husband.

=== Season 3 (2009) ===
No. overall	No. in season	Title	Directed by	Written by	Original release date	U.S. viewers (millions)
25	1	"Block Party"	Dan Attias	Mark V. Olsen & Will Scheffer	January 18, 2009	1.16
Bill tries to convince Native American businessman Jerry Flute to partner with him in a Mormon-friendly casino outside Salt Lake City, and finds a surprisingly effective ally in Margene. With Roman in jail and incensed at Alby for betraying him, Nicki temps at the DA's office to hunt down state's evidence for Adaleen. After learning that her cancer might have returned, Barb warms to the idea of Ana joining the family, though the waitress is resistant to the family's overtures. Meanwhile, Frank's teenage son Frankie ends up on Bill's doorstep after Frank throws him out; Sarah shatters Heather's dream of attending the same local college; after being roughed up in a bathroom, Alby becomes suspicious of Bill and, later, Adaleen; the annual block party becomes the battleground for Bill to defend his family against neighborhood gossip and for Nicki to defend her lifestyle as Roman Grant's daughter.
26	2	"Empire"	Jim McKay	Story by : Dustin Lance Black; Teleplay by : Dustin Lance Black and Mark V. Olsen & Will Scheffer	January 25, 2009	1.4
Bill and his family test out the group-dating waters with Ana, with mixed results. Bill presses ahead with his unlikely courtship of Jerry Flute, despite a sizable expense, a crisis in Don's family, and an apparent gaffe by Margene; Barb anxiously awaits test results from the hospital, while Nicki goes to a fertility clinic already knowing the result; Scott encounters unexpected resistance from Sarah when he offers to join her in Arizona; Roman puts the squeeze on Bill in an attempt to track down Rhonda, one of his would-be accusers; Frankie reveals a surprising side when he takes Sarah and her friends to a crash pad for wayward young polygamists; Frank visits Lois with new sister-wife Jodean and ends up staying longer than expected.
27	3	"Prom Queen"	David Petrarca	Eileen Myers	February 1, 2009	1.5
As Bill debates what to do with Rhonda, who may or may not testify at Roman's impending trial, another potential witness, Kathy, goes underground with Joey and Wanda; Frank finds himself in a bind and at Lois' mercy, and tries to talk his way out of the predicament, though she is unmoved; a revelation from Ana tests Bill's commitment, especially when he and Barb catch her in a compromising position; Margene gets disturbing personal news, but keeps her emotions in check; Barb's sister Cindy is back in town and heading up an anti-gaming committee that threatens the Henricksons' recent investments; Wanda spills a secret about Nicki's past that even Bill doesn't know, creating an instant rift and further fanning Bill's ire towards Roman; Sarah decides to attend her senior prom with Heather, with Ben and Frankie as their dates.
28	4	"On Trial"	David Knoller	Mark V. Olsen & Will Scheffer	February 8, 2009	1.91
With Roman's trial looming, Nicki struggles with her devotion to her father and her commitment to Bill, who is urging the DA to offer protective custody to witnesses Kathy and Rhonda. Attempting to get Alby to break ranks with Roman, Bill offers him an olive branch and gets an understandably skeptical response; on the lam from Juniper Creek henchmen, a desperate Lois turns to Bill for refuge, if not relief; worried about the family finances, Barb hits up her mother Nancy for a handout; an agitated Sarah considers her prospects, rejecting brother Ben's opinion; Adaleen tracks down Rhonda and offers her compelling reasons not to testify at Roman's trial; Margene takes on a new look in the aftermath of her mother's death; Bill startles Ana, and Nancy, with a bold proposal that could change the face of his family forever; Roman finally has his day in court, with his guilt or innocence hinging on the testimony of Kathy and her twin sister Jodean.
29	5	"For Better or Worse"	Julie Anne Robinson	Roberto Aguirre-Sacasa	February 15, 2009	2.0
Barb, Nicki and Margene bicker over living arrangements in the wake of the Henricksons' recent expansion. In an effort to track down his mother, Frankie makes a dangerous foray, with Sarah, Ben, and Heather, into the heart of Juniper Creek, where Alby has been clamping down with his "God Squads." Roman summons his children to his motel, offering up thinly-veiled threats to the compound's hierarchy; faced with daunting news in his effort to get a bank loan to pay for his casino venture, Bill plays hardball with his brother-in-law Ted, a connected businessman who covets a valuable historical document in Alby's possession;Nicki considers a return to her job with the DA, perhaps for the wrong reasons.
30	6	"Come, Ye Saints"	Dan Attias	Melanie Marnich	February 22, 2009	N/A
The Henricksons embark on a 2,500-mile road-trip pilgrimage to a Joseph Smith shrine in Hill Cumorah, New York, where Bill intends to bury a family time capsule in the sacred earth. Along the way, a series of jarring revelations test the limits of their family bonds – and Bill's faith. In 2009, TV Guide ranked this episode #93 on its list of the 100 Greatest Episodes.
31	7	"Fight or Flight"	Adam Davidson	Patricia Breen	March 1, 2009	2.4
Treading on dangerous ground at home and work, Nicki endures a domestic "intervention" by Bill and Barb, followed by an unwelcome office visit from Margene. At Juniper Creek, Glory, angry at being usurped by Lura and shunned by Alby, smuggles a copy of a potentially-incendiary church document to Bill, who isn’t sure how to handle the discovery. Meanwhile, Joey looks to make a major life change by adding Kathy as a second wife, but Hollis Greene and Roman Roman have other plans.
32	8	"Rough Edges"	Dan Attias	Mark V. Olsen & Will Scheffer	March 8, 2009	N/A
Bill urges the DA’s office to bring a murder charge against Roman, but Ray Henry is distracted by news about Nicki; Bill sends Don on a road trip to investigate a tribal "grudge" involving the casino, but learns that the license hold-up might actually be the fault of his brother-in-law Ted – and the church document he bought from Alby. Having reclaimed her identity from Nicki, Margene decides to launch a start-up business selling bracelets. Nicki seeks refuge in her past; Sarah struggles to map out her future; Bill has a close call with the Greenes.
33	9	"Outer Darkness"	Michael Lehmann	Eileen Myers	March 15, 2009	2.3
Buoyed by a visit from Barb and Margene, Nicki returns home after getting a call from Bill, but her spirits sag when his intentions become clear; Exposed by Cindy and Ted, Barb faces a wrenching excommunication hearing at her former church; Wanda performs a makeover on Jodean that has Joey seeing double; Scott shows up at the Henricksons' and reconnects with Sarah, though not with Ben or Bill; Ted throws Bill a curveball by demanding a piece of the casino project he undermined; a kidnapping involving the Greenes leads Bill to reconsider his hard-line position on Roman, to Joey’s shock and outrage.
34	10	"Sacrament"	Dan Attias	Story by : Coleman Herbert; Teleplay by : Victoria Morrow	March 22, 2009	2.7
Bill convinces Ray Henry to endorse his plan to rescue a kidnapping victim while bringing down the Greenes and Roman, but the Prophet ends up changing the rules; Nicki’s web of secrets gets more tangled when a surprise visitor comes to see her at the compound; worried about Barb’s emotional state, and eyeing a resolution of the casino stalemate, Bill makes an endowment deal that leaves Ted speechless; Alby hatches a deadly plot to consolidate his power; Margene makes the most of her opportunity as a TV pitchwoman; and Sarah shocks the family with a surprise announcement.

=== Season 4 (2010) ===
No. overall	No. in season	Title	Directed by	Written by	Original release date	U.S. viewers (millions)
35	1	"Free at Last"	Dan Attias	Mark V. Olsen & Will Scheffer	January 10, 2010	1.73
With the grand opening of the Blackfoot Magic Casino only days away, the Henricksons make last-minute preparations under the skeptical eye of Tommy Flute, son of Bill's partner Jerry; as the Feds continue to probe unfinished business concerning Roman Grant, Alby has a close encounter with Dale Tomasson, the state-appointed trustee of Juniper Creek's assets; at the compound, Adaleen shares a shocking secret with Nicki, who's under fire for opening a new bank account for Roman. Though her home-shopping business is thriving, Margie makes an on-air slip-up that prompts her boss Beverly to voice concerns about possible burnout; worried for her safety, Lois offers Frank a piece of her fledgling bird-purveying business. Bill and J.J. Walker, Nicki's unpredictable ex, work out an arrangement that allows Cara Lynn to stay at the Henricksons' during the week while attending high school. Ben lands a gig with his Christian rock band and ends up being called into backup duty for another.
36	2	"The Greater Good"	David Knoller	Paul Redford	January 17, 2010	1.54
Ignoring pleas from Nicki to become Juniper Creek's next Prophet, Bill contemplates running for the vacant Utah State Senate seat against ardent polygamy foe Roy Colburn; Joey and Wanda return to Juniper Creek, but a suspicious J.J. is lurking; Sarah and Scott decide to forgo a wedding in Bill's church in favor of a civil ceremony, shocking Barb, who nevertheless takes steps with Bill to be re-admitted to the church that excommunicated them. J.J., making his mark in a UEB satellite compound in Kansas, has a contentious dinner at the Henricksons' with his cancer-ridden wife Malinda; Margene confronts Nicki about her feelings for Ray Henry, who's moving away after losing his case; a reform-minded Dale tries to keep Alby at bay, to little avail.
37	3	"Strange Bedfellows"	Adam Davidson	Roberto Aguirre-Sacasa	January 24, 2010	1.67
Bill, Nicki, and Cara Lynn travel to Washington, D.C., where Bill tries to land an endorsement from Congressman Clark Paley while repairing his relationship with Nicki, but first he must get past his faux pas with Marilyn Densham, Paley’s political crony. Back in Utah, Margene and her "Hearts on a Sleeve" line go prime time, but a case of mistaken identity tempers her on-air triumph. Joined by Sarah, Barb leads a series of seminars on sensitivity training at the casino. Fearing that Wanda spilled the beans about Roman’s murder to J.J., Joey goes to extremes to safeguard their dirty secret. Barb and Sarah hit a young Native American woman with their car, prompting Sarah to personally compensate the victim and her baby. Even as his affection for Dale deepens, Alby is tormented by reminders of his late father’s judgment.
38	4	"The Mighty and Strong"	Dan Attias	Melanie Marnich	January 31, 2010	1.52
When an audit uncovers insurance discrepancies at Home Plus, Bill takes drastic steps to protect his secrets and save his candidacy. J.J. approaches Alby with a partial solution on how to dispose of a "flock cast adrift," flummoxing Nicki. Lois, Frank, and Jodean encounter a border scare in their quest for exotic birds. Sarah gets a taste of motherhood, albeit with someone else’s child. Alby is tormented by his inner Roman, and torn by what he sees as Dale’s betrayal. Troubled by Tancy’s surprising revelation about Margene and Ben, Bill decides that a change of scene might be best for his firstborn son.
39	5	"Sins of the Father"	David Petrarca	Seth Greenland	February 7, 2010	1.31
Bill pulls out all the stops in his efforts to win Paley's support for the state senate nomination, while Nicki relishes her role as his campaign's "secret weapon." Marilyn makes a pitch to represent the casino's interests in Washington, but encounters resistance from Tommy. Frank picks an inopportune moment to drop by the casino with Lois and Jodean. Bill absorbs a last-minute sucker punch from Colburn, but turns the tide by embracing the Lost Boy in himself.
40	6	"Under One Roof"	Dan Attias	Coleman Herbert	February 14, 2010	1.50
Ana resurfaces with a surprise revelation that shakes up the family. Bill tries to get Tommy and Jerry to rebrand the casino and expand its advertising into Idaho; Lois and Frank take Ben and Jodean south of the border to visit bird vendor Don Dona, at their collective peril; Margene worries about the impact of Bill's future outing on her booming business; with a flourish, Bill shows his wives the family's collective future.
41	7	"Blood Atonement"	David Petrarca	Julia Cho	February 21, 2010	1.71
With revenge-minded Joey in tow, Bill makes an emergency trip to Mexico after Lois and Frank's latest smuggling escapade backfires; Nicki is jolted by a doctor's news, but is even more flummoxed by Adaleen's shocking revelation; Margene offers a novel remedy to keep Ana from leaving the country with her fiancé; after a scare at the casino, Barb and Tommy look for culprits — and find some disturbing answers.
42	8	"Next Ticket Out"	David Knoller	Patricia Breen	February 28, 2010	1.92
While Nicki makes an all-out attempt to be the woman that Bill wants her to be, Sarah shakes up the family with an announcement; Margene is put on the defensive when Bill questions her real reasons for getting married; an ill-timed remark at a ladies-only event puts Barb in an unwanted spotlight; Marilyn looks to bring down Bill as his campaign winds down; Barb jolts Nicki with news about Joey that Bill was supposed to deliver; while suspicious Bill looks for clues about J.J. in Kansas, Adaleen finds them closer to home.
43	9	"End of Days"	David Petrarca	Eileen Myers	March 7, 2010	1.71
With the State Senate election only days away, Bill puts the squeeze on Paley in an attempt to protect his candidacy. But Marilyn has an ace up her sleeve that threatens to wreck Bill’s chances, or so it seems. At the casino, Jerry and Tom’s tribal leadership is jeopardized by the illegal actions of family members. Caught in a tangled family web, Margene weighs her allegiance to Bill with her desire to keep Ana and Goran in her life. Desperate to get pregnant, Nicki gets news from Dr. Roquet Walker – J.J.’s son – that seems too good to be true. A late-breaking polygamist scandal in Kansas becomes national news, forcing Bill and his three wives to rethink their bold post-election plans.

=== Season 5 (2011) ===
No. overall	No. in season	Title	Directed by	Written by	Original release date	U.S. viewers (millions)
44	1	"Winter"	David Petrarca	Mark V. Olsen & Will Scheffer	January 16, 2011	1.21
After restful post-election days in the wilderness, reality hits the Henricksons on their return to Salt Lake City. At Home Plus, Bill's attempts to bolster morale in the wake of his polygamist revelation fall on mostly deaf ears, and he faces an uphill battle for his political life even before the swearing-in. At home, he tries to assuage the concerns of his wives and kids, who face psychological—and physical—threats around town. To stem this growing tide of ill will, Bill decides to hold an open house for his 40,000 constituents, some of whom may actually show up. Alby returns from his desert exile with a newfound desire to "purify" the compound, and exact vengeance on Bill.
45	2	"A Seat at the Table"	Adam Davidson	Julia Cho	January 23, 2011	1.12
Bill's attempt to stage a Safety Net meeting for polygamist leaders is hindered by Alby and Home Plus objectors. In an effort to find common ground with her mother, Barb asks Nancy to join her at a symposium focusing on mother-daughter Mormon challenges. Nicki learns the extent of Adaleen's isolation; Marge despairs over the quandary involving Ana and Goran; Cara Lynn impresses her math teacher, Greg.
46	3	"Certain Poor Shepherds"	David Petrarca	Jami O'Brien	January 30, 2011	1.03
The Henricksons try to put on a unified face during Christmas, but are tested amid numbing revelations. Margie admits that she was 16 when she married Bill; Adaleen tells Cara Lynn that she is pregnant with a monster; Lura runs away to a shelter in response to Alby's zealous efforts to "purify" the compound; Lois drifts towards senility; Bill tries to soften up a senator by having his family sing Christmas carols at his office; Ben bonds with Heather. Cara Lynn discovers that her father is dead after a trip to his burned-down clinic.
47	4	"The Oath"	Omar Madha	Melanie Marnich	February 6, 2011	0.77
With his swearing-in ceremony days away, Bill searches for ways to overcome the anti-polygamist sentiment swelling among state officials. Meanwhile, Barb's strategic attendance at a First Ladies' fashion show triggers lingering resentment between Nicki and Margene and between Barb and Nicki. Rhonda and exiled polygamist Verlan try to shake down Alby; Margene and Pam find their niche with Goji Blast and Michael Sainte; Nicki pushes for Cara Lynn's adoption; Lois learns that she has dementia; Ben kisses Heather and thanks her for her sensitivity in understanding his family.
48	5	"The Special Relationship"	David Petrarca	Patricia Breen	February 13, 2011	0.99
Bill makes a deal to ensure "Safety Net" in the Senate, but finds new obstacles to his livelihood being raised by LDS officials who ask that he refrain from referring to himself as a Mormon. Barb becomes fed up with interning. She claims that women are coequal with men in their relationship to God and believes herself to be a priesthood holder. Bill and Nicki cannot adopt Cara Lynn unless they are married, but Barb is reluctant to get a divorce. Margene preaches the Goji gospel; Rhonda encourages Verlan to do whatever Alby wants to get money; Lois longs for her old life with Frank; Don is almost drowned on a family ice-fishing trip as revenge for Bill's actions.
49	6	"D.I.V.O.R.C.E."	Howard Deutch	Mark V. Olsen & Will Scheffer	February 20, 2011	1.04
Barb capitulates on Bill's marital plans, but not on her hopes to attain the priesthood. To shore up her case, she enlists ex-Mormon feminist Renee Clayton, much to her mother Nancy's chagrin. Meanwhile, Bill faces new impeachment pressure in the Senate and scrambles for new clients in the wake of LDS boycotts of his stores. With her eye on a new prize, Nicki chafes at the status quo; Margene eyes a sponsor for her pro-polygamy children's rally; Cara Lynn puts in extra hours with her tutor Greg; Alby vows to combat Safety Net with his own purification program; Bud Mayberry warns Bill of an imminent threat; reunited by Bill, Frank and Lois strike a deal; Heather makes a decision that deflates vulnerable Ben.
50	7	"Til Death Do Us Part"	David Petrarca	Aaron Allen	February 27, 2011	1.05
Bill eyes a wedding as a chance to reseal his commitment to his three wives, though Barb remains skeptical; meanwhile, Nicki looks to take full advantage of her special day. Alby makes a game-changing power play; Lois resists Barb's vision of her future; Margie is cautioned about the financial pitfalls of Goji Blast; Cara Lynn brings a guest to the theater; Heather changes her mind about Ben.
51	8	"The Noose Tightens"	David Knoller	Seth Greenland	March 6, 2011	1.36
Bill looks to Alby's past in an effort to thwart his ambitions, leading Alby to concoct yet another diabolical scheme to bring down the Henricksons. Meanwhile, in the wake of a festering investigation into Bill's private life, an incredulous Barb finds herself targeted as her husband's accomplice; Nicki's "rescue" of a skittish compound wife complicates life at home and lands her in hot water at Juniper Creek; stung by an assertion by Michael Sainte, Margene finds herself at the crossroads in her business with Goji Blast; Don suffers emotional aftershocks that could have a lasting impact on Home Plus; Cara Lynn's secret leaks out; Heather apologizes for spilling the beans about Margene.
52	9	"Exorcism"	Adam Davidson	Roberto Aguirre-Sacasa	March 13, 2011	1.37
With Alby on the run and posing an imminent threat, the Henricksons go into lockdown mode; frazzled though not incapacitated after a near-death experience, Nicki decides to break Cara Lynn's "dependencies" by enrolling her in boarding school; Barb spars with Bill about her new church's stance on polygamy and her commitment to the family; Lois begs Frank to rescue her from confinement; Margene vows to repay Pam for her Goji investment; Ben and Bill debate what to do about Rhonda.
53	10	"When Men and Mountains Meet"	Dan Attias	Mark V. Olsen & Will Scheffer	March 20, 2011	1.57
Alby and Bill are in jail—until Bill is released on bail by his wives; Frank and Lois reminisce in bed after he gives her a lethal injection; Bill is shot in the street and killed by distraught Carl. Several months later, Barb officiates over a christening of Sarah's son, named after his late grandfather, Margene prepares to go on a missionary trip to Central America, and the wives embrace. Bill's spirit can be seen by the audience sitting at the head of the dining room table, smiling at his wives.

== Webisodes: "In the Beginning" ==
Prior to Season 2, HBO aired a series of three Webisodes collectively entitled "Big Love: In The Beginning" which explored how the Henricksons came to be a family. These three short films were also included on the Season 2 DVD release.

No.	Title	Directed by	Written by	Original release date
1	"Post-Partum"	Mark V. Olsen & Will Scheffer	David Knoller	June 4, 2007
Set 5 years prior to season one – shows Nicki worrying about her place in the family after giving birth to son Wayne.
2	"Meet the Babysitter"	Mark V. Olsen & Will Scheffer	David Knoller	June 4, 2007
Set 3 years prior to season one – introduces the clan to Margene, an ex-Home Plus employee who takes a job as the family's babysitter.
3	"Moving Day"	Mark V. Olsen & Will Scheffer	David Knoller	June 4, 2007
Set 14 months prior to season one – finds the three wives teaming up to try to convince Bill to move to a bigger residence.
