= Outer Darkness (Big Love) =

- Big Love episode
- Episode no.: Season 3 Episode 9
- Directed by: Michael Lehmann
- Written by: Eileen Myers
- Cinematography by: Anette Haellmigk
- Editing by: Byron Smith
- Original release date: March 15, 2009
- Running time: 54 minutes

Guest appearances
- Ellen Burstyn as Nancy Dutton; Željko Ivanek as J.J. Percy Walker; Charles Esten as Ray Henry; Aaron Paul as Scott Quittman; Luke Askew as Hollis Green; Robert Beltran as Jerry Flute; Patrick Fabian as Ted Price; Judith Hoag as Cindy Price; Garrett M. Brown as Bishop Devery; Anne Dudek as Lura Grant; Michael Ensign as Ritual Superior; Ben Lemon as Laurel Davis; Sandy Martin as Selma Green; Thomas Kopache as McKonky

Episode chronology
← Previous "Rough Edges"	Next → "Sacrament"

"Outer Darkness" is the ninth episode of the third season of the American drama television series Big Love. It is the 33rd overall episode of the series and was written by co-producer Eileen Myers, and directed by Michael Lehmann. It originally aired on HBO on March 15, 2009.

The series is set in Salt Lake City and follows Bill Henrickson, a fundamentalist Mormon. He practices polygamy, having Barbara, Nicki and Margie as his wives. The series charts the family's life in and out of the public sphere in their suburb, as well as their associations with a fundamentalist compound in the area. In the episode, the Henricksons face struggles after Nicki's absence, while Barbara faces a wrenching excommunication hearing at her old church.

According to Nielsen Media Research, the episode was seen by an estimated 2.30 million household viewers. The episode received critical acclaim, who praised the conflicts, performances and writing as strong points.

== Plot ==
Barbara (Jeanne Tripplehorn) and Margie (Ginnifer Goodwin) ask Bill (Bill Paxton) to contact Nicki (Chloë Sevigny), but he refuses. Bill instead meets with Ted (Patrick Fabian) to address the letter, but is frustrated when he learns that he agreed to licence the casino if he received 10% of profits, which Jerry (Robert Beltran) agreed.

Barbara is visited by Bishop Devery (Garrett M. Brown) and representative Laurel Davis (Ben Lemon), who inform her they are considered severe repercussions due to her act of polygamy, which she confirms. While visiting Nicki, Barbara tells Bill about her possible excommunication. Desperate, she contacts Nancy (Ellen Burstyn) and Cindy (Judith Hoag) for help, asking them to use their connections to get an endowment. During this, Wanda (Melora Walters) decides to comfort Joey (Shawn Doyle) by having Jodean (Mireille Enos) don a similar look to Kathy, but this only angers Joey even more.

Scott (Aaron Paul) returns and tries to talk with Sarah (Amanda Seyfried) over her miscarriage. But he is punched by (Ben Smith), and forced by Bill to not visit her again. At the endowment ceremony, Barbara discovers that Cindy was responsible for informing the church about her acts, and decides to cut all ties to her. Bill asks Nicki for the divorce, shocking her and causing her to return home to talk with Barbara and Margie. But to her surprise, Barbara is seriously considering the divorce after telling them that Cindy was involved. However, they are informed that Ted's and Cindy's daughter has been kidnapped by the Greenes, and they will not release her until Bill gives up the letter.

To get the daughter back, Bill and Roman (Harry Dean Stanton) agree to cooperate, and they make a deal with Ray (Charles Esten); Roman will help in getting the daughter back in exchange for returning to the compound, which will also allow Ray to get information to prosecute Roman. Barbara attends her hearing, and after declaring that she does not neglect her actions, is excommunicated from the church. Bill visits Joey, who has just discovered that Roman and the Greenes were involved in Kathy's death. Bill reveals his partnership with Roman, causing an irate Joey to reprimand him and refuses to acknowledge him as his brother. Bill accidentally falls through the boards, and the episode ends as he stares at the night.

== Production ==
=== Development ===
The episode was written by co-producer Eileen Myers, and directed by Michael Lehmann. This was Myers' seventh writing credit, and Lehmann's third directing credit.

== Reception ==
=== Viewers ===
In its original American broadcast, "Outer Darkness" was seen by an estimated 2.30 million household viewers.

=== Critical reviews ===
"Outer Darkness" received critical acclaim. Amelie Gillette of The A.V. Club gave the episode an "A" grade and wrote, "Joey, still raw with grief and teeming with anger naturally doesn't take the news of Bill's alliance with Roman very well. He cuts his brotherly ties with Bill, who at this point shouldn't worry about being cast into outer darkness. As we saw at the end of the episode, when he was lying on his back in the barn staring up at the dark vast night sky above, he's basically already there."

Emily St. James of Slant Magazine wrote, "“What is it in us, Alby, that makes us the way we are?” Nicki asks early in “Outer Darkness,” Big Love Season Three's penultimate episode. The whole episode hinges on that question and returns to one of Big Love's favorite themes — the uneasy mix between the purity of religious creed and the imperfection of human beings."

James Poniewozik of TIME wrote, "Besides the letter itself, the way its discovery has played out (Barb being excommunicated apparently as punishment for it, and the statement “Some things that are true are not very useful”) has not exactly been flattering to the church. I'd be curious to know what any LDS readers have thought of it." Mark Blankenship of HuffPost wrote, "I loved this episode. I was moved and engaged, which means I am now complicit in turning a sacred ritual into an entertainment product. I need more time to sort out what that means to me."
