= Prom Queen (Big Love) =

- Big Love episode
- Episode no.: Season 3 Episode 3
- Directed by: David Petrarca
- Written by: Eileen Myers
- Cinematography by: Anette Haellmigk
- Editing by: Byron Smith
- Original release date: February 1, 2009
- Running time: 59 minutes

Guest appearances
- Ellen Burstyn as Nancy Dutton; Daveigh Chase as Rhonda Volmer; Charles Esten as Ray Henry; Branka Katić as Ana Mesovich; Patrick Fabian as Ted Price; Judith Hoag as Cindy Dutton; Tina Majorino as Heather Tuttle; Mark L. Young as Frankie; Mark Deklin as Jack; Alan Fudge as Ed Hemenway

Episode chronology
← Previous "Empire"	Next → "On Trial"

"Prom Queen" is the third episode of the third season of the American drama television series Big Love. It is the 27th overall episode of the series and was written by Eileen Myers, and directed by David Petrarca. It originally aired on HBO on February 1, 2009.

The series is set in Salt Lake City and follows Bill Henrickson, a fundamentalist Mormon. He practices polygamy, having Barbara, Nicki and Margie as his wives. The series charts the family's life in and out of the public sphere in their suburb, as well as their associations with a fundamentalist compound in the area. In the episode, Bill tries to get Rhonda to drop out as a witness, while Lois takes Frank as a hostage in her house.

According to Nielsen Media Research, the episode was seen by an estimated 1.50 million household viewers. The episode received critical acclaim, with particular praise towards Chloë Sevigny's performance and character development.

== Plot ==
Frankie (Mark L. Young) is revealed to be living with Rhonda (Daveigh Chase), who is also his girlfriend. Bill (Bill Paxton) arrives, trying to get Rhonda in leaving the city, as her testimony may get her to lose the civil case against Roman (Harry Dean Stanton). He gives her money and sees her boarding a bus to leave the city.

With Wanda (Melora Walters) in trouble with Alby (Matt Ross), Joey (Shawn Doyle), Kathy (Mireille Enos) and Wanda are forced to leave the compound and stay with the Henricksons for a few days. Margie (Ginnifer Goodwin) is informed that her mother has died, but she is unable to think of anything positive about her, as she was absent through her life. Barbara (Jeanne Tripplehorn) is surprised when Nancy (Ellen Burstyn) drops by, informing her that Cindy (Judith Hoag) has moved in with his husband Ted (Patrick Fabian). She decides to visit Cindy, discovering that she is part of an anti-gambling committee, which could jeopardize Bill's Weber Gaming venture.

Lois (Grace Zabriskie) keeps a tied Frank (Bruce Dern) in her shed, making him watch her dig his grave. She subsequently humiliates him and serves him food, before planning to kill him. Bill and Barbara visit Ana (Branka Katić), discovering that she is still seeing a man from her past. Bill calls off his relationship, and Barbara explains the decision to Ana. As Bill helps Joey with his situation, he learns a horrific truth: their sister Maggie was married against her will, and she chose to commit suicide. Nicki (Chloë Sevigny) starts her job at the DA's office, under the supervision of her boss Ray Henry (Charles Esten). However, she is shaken upon learning that Kathy is one of the four witnesses against Roman. She confronts Wanda for not disclosing it, and the family learns that with Rhonda out, Kathy is the only pivotal witness against Roman.

Sarah (Amanda Seyfried) decides to go with Heather (Tina Majorino) to the prompt, with Ben (Douglas Smith) and Frankie (Mark L. Young) as dates. But Sarah and Ben are mocked by many of the students for going together. When Wanda tries to drown herself at the pool, Kathy finally reveals the pressure of her past, having been forced to marry when she was 15. Wanda also reveals that Nicki was similarly married to a man known as J.J. at the same age, surprising Bill. Nicki returns to the office to take out photos of her, where she is consoled by Ray over her problems. As Lois starts killing Frank by putting an air bag over his face, she is called by Bill, who demands to know the truth about Maggie's death. Lois silently confirms it, and she decides to spare Frank. Rhonda visits Roman in prison, demanding $100,000 to not testify, but he refuses. Advised by Barbara, Bill reconciles with Ana. Now alone, Sarah finally reveals to Ben about her pregnancy.

== Production ==
=== Development ===
The episode was written by Eileen Myers, and directed by David Petrarca. This was Myers' sixth writing credit, and Petrarca's first directing credit.

== Reception ==
=== Viewers ===
In its original American broadcast, "Prom Queen" was seen by an estimated 1.50 million household viewers. This was a slight increase in viewership from the previous episode, which was watched by an estimated 1.40 million household viewers.

=== Critical reviews ===
"Prom Queen" received critical acclaim. Amelie Gillette of The A.V. Club gave the episode an "A" grade and wrote, "In this way, Nicki and Rhonda are very similar. They're both special girls: Rhonda because Roman chose to marry her; Nicki because Roman chose to let her out of her marriage. But as Nicki sees while thumbing through the Joy books in the DA's office, there's nothing really special or different about her. She's just another one of her father's victims, just another collection of photos meant to sell her to prospective husbands. And, for the time being at least, like Rhonda she's returned to her abuser."

Nick Catucci of Vulture wrote, "Beautiful as she is, Chloë Sevigny plays Nicki so self-contained that she hardly seems a part of Bill's bedroom buffet. The show loves sex scenes, but her's are the only ones that are properly fraught. Wet with tears, exposed in her business-casual camouflage, she’s so vulnerable that that the lawyer D-bag who discovers her with the “Joy Book” absolutely melts, the way we can never quite believe the women do for Bill. She's finally the center of the show — and she is, rightfully, coming apart."

Emily St. James of Slant Magazine wrote, "If I was so moved by that moment when she broke down in the DA's arms as to analyze why I was so moved, even as I knew how it would play out, it was because there's just something about seeing someone you care for completely fall apart." Mark Blankenship of HuffPost gave the episode an "A+" grade and wrote, "the episode constructs an elegant central theme, then spins endless variations on it. The result is sixty-five minutes of remarkable drama, and frankly, I can't think of a better television episode I've seen this year."

David Petrarca submitted this episode for consideration for Outstanding Directing for a Drama Series, while Eileen Myers submitted it for Outstanding Writing for a Drama Series at the 61st Primetime Emmy Awards.
