= Fight or Flight (Big Love) =

- Big Love episode
- Episode no.: Season 3 Episode 7
- Directed by: Adam Davidson
- Written by: Patricia Breen
- Cinematography by: Anette Haellmigk
- Editing by: Chris Figler
- Original release date: March 1, 2009
- Running time: 54 minutes

Guest appearances
- Mary Kay Place as Adaleen Grant; Charles Esten as Ray Henry; Tina Majorino as Heather Tuttle; Luke Askew as Hollis Green; Anne Dudek as Lura Grant; Patrick Fabian as Ted Price; Judith Hoag as Cindy Price; Sandy Martin as Selma Green; Kate Norby as Glory; Audrey Wasilewski as Pam Martin

Episode chronology
← Previous "Come, Ye Saints"	Next → "Rough Edges"

"Fight or Flight" is the seventh episode of the third season of the American drama television series Big Love. It is the 31st overall episode of the series and was written by co-producer Patricia Breen, and directed by Adam Davidson. It originally aired on HBO on March 1, 2009.

The series is set in Salt Lake City and follows Bill Henrickson, a fundamentalist Mormon. He practices polygamy, having Barbara, Nicki and Margie as his wives. The series charts the family's life in and out of the public sphere in their suburb, as well as their associations with a fundamentalist compound in the area. In the episode, Bill helps Joey and Kathy with their wedding, while Margie discovers Nicki's real job.

According to Nielsen Media Research, the episode was seen by an estimated 2.40 million household viewers. The episode received generally positive reviews from critics, who expressed surprise with the ending.

== Plot ==
Bill (Bill Paxton) and Barbara (Jeanne Tripplehorn) talk with Sarah (Amanda Seyfried) over her miscarriage. Sarah does not express sadness, and wants to move on with her life. Bill is also asked by Joey (Shawn Doyle) and Kathy (Mireille Enos) to officiate their wedding, which he accepts.

Ray (Charles Esten) surprises Nicki (Chloë Sevigny) by asking her out. She declines the invitation, but after the family talks about her birth control pills, she decides to accept it. Alby (Matt Ross) is confronted by one of his wives, Glory (Kate Norby), for not wanting to have children with her. Angered, she steals a valuable letter which contains a statement by Wilford Woodruff endorsing polygamy in the church. She gives the letter to Bill and Joey, but they question if Alby is just playing with them. They also warn Kathy to not get other women in Juniper Creek to turn against Roman (Harry Dean Stanton), as they fear consequences for her actions. Bill tries to get Ted (Patrick Fabian) to check on the letter, but they do not reach a deal.

Margie (Ginnifer Goodwin) surprises Nicki at her job, but gets confused when Ray refers to Nicki as "Margie", and Margie as "Barbara". Privately, Nicki finally reveals the truth: she used her name, and is working at the DA's office. Margie is upset, and orders her to quit or she will tell Bill and Barbara. Margie dyes her hair back to black, and informs Barbara about Nicki quitting her job, upsetting her. Roman meets with Hollis (Luke Askew) and Selma Green (Sandy Martin), forming a truce wherein Hollis will get a new wife. Sarah surprises Barbara by saying she will not go to Arizona State University as planned. When she tells Heather (Tina Majorino), the latter cries and accuses her of manipulating her.

Nicki packs her stuff at the office, and is noticed by Ray as she leaves. When she explains she is leaving, he surprises her by kissing her. Wanda (Melora Walters) finally accepts her role in Joey's life, and asks Kathy to be his first wife, which she gladly accepts. Before the wedding, Kathy leaves for flowers at the farm. However, he is taken by Roman and Adaleen (Mary Kay Place), who brings her to Hollis. Roman states that she will marry Hollis, and then they will both leave for Mexico. Luke stabs Selma and steals a truck to escape, accidentally getting her ponytail trapped in the car's door. Roman gives chase and rams her truck, causing her to crash into a pole and killing her. Roman is horrified upon discovering her corpse.

== Production ==
=== Development ===
The episode was written by co-producer Patricia Breen, and directed by Adam Davidson. This was Breen's first writing credit, and Davidson's second directing credit.

== Reception ==
=== Viewers ===
In its original American broadcast, "Fight or Flight" was seen by an estimated 2.40 million household viewers.

=== Critical reviews ===
"Fight or Flight" received generally positive reviews from critics. Amelie Gillette of The A.V. Club gave the episode a "B" grade and wrote, "Only three episodes left, and by my count this season of Big Love has already had about four mini-season finales. But somehow the drama keeps clip, clip, clipping along. I've often heard Big Love compared to a soap opera, but soap operas are rarely this dense, satisfying, or eventful."

Nick Catucci of Vulture wrote, "It was only the beginning of this season that we acknowledged — in a perfunctory, even jaded manner — that Big Love makes art of male fantasy. Men — so insensitive. This episode, Bill's sister-wives-in-law come to the fore, and even an avowed Brown Bunny fan has to see the show for what it really is: an interrogation into the compromised lives of women." Emily St. James of Slant Magazine wrote, "As if making penance for the last two weeks of limited Juniper Creek storylines, Sunday night's Big Love, “Fight or Flight,” was probably the most Juniper Creek-heavy episode of the season, if not since season one. Some of this was interesting. Some of it wasn't. But pretty much all of it trafficked in the strange weirdness of the setting, and that kept some of the tragic things that happened at Juniper Creek from fully passing over from bizarre to truly affecting."

Mark Blankenship of HuffPost wrote, "And oh, you could see in Ginnifer Goodwin's eyes that she knew exactly what she was doing. Nicky couldn't resist this plan without exposing her D.A. deceit, and so, boom. Margene got her way." Eric Hochberger of TV Fanatic wrote, "Wow was last night's episode of Big Love fill with drama! Bill and Barb were out investigating a secret document that may make polygamy okay in the Church's eye. Meanwhile, Nicki went out on an inappropriate date with her boss."

Adam Davidson submitted this episode for consideration for Outstanding Directing for a Drama Series at the 61st Primetime Emmy Awards.
