= When Men and Mountains Meet =

- Big Love episode
- Episode no.: Season 5 Episode 10
- Directed by: Dan Attias
- Written by: Mark V. Olsen; Will Scheffer
- Cinematography by: Anette Haellmigk
- Editing by: Byron Smith
- Original release date: March 20, 2011
- Running time: 63 minutes

Guest appearances
- Amanda Seyfried as Sarah Henrickson; Aaron Paul as Scott Quittman; Bruce Dern as Frank Harlow; Joel McKinnon Miller as Don Embry; Gregory Itzin as Senator Barn; Carlos Jacott as Carl Martin; Tina Majorino as Heather Tuttle; Rebecca Wisocky as Emma Smith

Episode chronology
← Previous "Exorcism"	Next → —

"When Men and Mountains Meet" is the series finale of the American drama television series Big Love. It is the tenth episode of the fifth season and the 53rd overall episode of the series. The episode was written by series creators Mark V. Olsen and Will Scheffer, and directed by Dan Attias. It originally aired on HBO on March 20, 2011.

The series is set in Salt Lake City and follows Bill Henrickson, a fundamentalist Mormon. He practices polygamy, having Barbara, Nicki and Margie as his wives. The series charts the family's life in and out of the public sphere in their suburb, as well as their associations with a fundamentalist compound in the area. In the series finale, Bill ponders over the future of his family.

According to Nielsen Media Research, the episode was seen by an estimated 1.57 million household viewers and gained a 0.7/2 ratings share among adults aged 18–49. The series finale received generally positive reviews from critics, who deemed the ending as fitting for the series' themes and characters, although some expressed frustration with unresolved subplots and rushed storylines.

== Plot ==
After the shooting, Alby (Matt Ross) is kept at a detention center while Bill (Bill Paxton) is bailed out. Amidst heavy media scrutiny, Barbara (Jeanne Tripplehorn) decides to go forward with her baptism for priesthood, despite knowing her family will not take it well.

Bill discovers a passport for Margie (Ginnifer Goodwin), and she reveals she planned to volunteering on a medical ship while she worked on her Goji venture. Cara Lynn (Cassi Thomson) is informed that her adoption has been delayed, and she debates returning to her old family, worrying Nicki (Chloë Sevigny). Bill dismmisses the criminal charges targeted at him, although he later tells Barbara that the District Attorney has arranged just one year of prison for a guilty plea. Discovering her baptism plans, Bill chooses to move out for the night. Seeing their car's poor condition, Barbara decides to change it for a new Convertible, and she takes Nicki and Margie for a ride. Bill is furious upon learning she changed the car without consulting it with him, also revealing that their financial situation is in trouble as they have lost Home Plus.

At her nursery home, Frank (Bruce Dern) consoles Lois (Grace Zabriskie) before fatally injecting her to end her suffering. At his hearing, Bill shocks the public by suggesting he can legalize polygamy. While Barn (Gregory Itzin) condemns his decision, he is met with immense support by many polygamists. Barbara decides to change her mind and abandons her baptism, joining Bill at his church. As he delivers a sermon, Bill imagines seeing Emma Smith in attendance. Bill decides to sell his casino share, hoping this will mark a new beginning for the family. As he leaves to pick up Lois, unaware of her fate, he is approached by Carl (Carlos Jacott) on the street. Carl pulls out a gun and fatally shoots Bill thrice and leaves the scene. Barbara, Margie and Nicki quickly surround him, and Barbara bless him before he succumbs to his wounds.

Eleven months later, Sarah (Amanda Seyfried) visits her family for her son's christening, named Bill. Barbara now leads Bill's church, Nicki takes more decisions at the house, Margie has taken a new job and occasionally visits the family, and Ben (Douglas Smith) and Heather (Tina Majorino) are back together. Before leaving to go on a missionary trip to Central America, Margie laments that Bill could not see this day. As Barbara, Nicki and Margie embrace, Bill's ghost is seen at the table.

== Production ==
=== Development ===
In October 2010, HBO confirmed that the fifth season would be the series' last. Series creators Mark V. Olsen and Will Scheffer released a statement, "When we created Big Love in 2002, we had a strong conception of the journey the Henrickson family would make over the course of the series, of the story we had to tell. While we were in the writers' room this year shaping our fifth season, we discovered that we were approaching the culmination of that story."

The episode was written by series creators Mark V. Olsen and Will Scheffer, and directed by Dan Attias. This was Olsen's 21st writing credit, Scheffer's 21st writing credit, and Attias' ninth directing credit.

=== Writing ===
On Bill's death, Olsen and Scheffer explained that they wanted to give him a "Gary Cooper exit" but their plans kept changing. They did not want Bill to go out a loser or a failure or an unrepentant fundamentalist, feeling that "the greatest testimony to Bill would be that he had created a family that endured." The choice to have Carl be his killer was because "it is thematically of our world. It is the poor guy who is suffering so much with the pressures of expectations that are placed on men in this culture - it felt like it had some resonance to the material." When he received the script, Bill Paxton was not initially happy with Bill's death. Olsen said, "he feels, rightfully so, that he has husbanded that character for five years, and it hurt him to know that that character was going to die." They said that it took him 1–2 weeks to view things differently. Paxton would later say, "I think at the end of the day, I have to be objective and say they ended it right."

One scene was cut from the episode, wherein Ben made one more "overture" to Heather to apologize. Rhonda would give up with them, and proceed to leave the city to pursue her music career. The scene was cut, not due to time constraints, but "momentum." Olsen said, "By the time that would've come up we were dealing with so many other deeper things that it felt like a frivolous scene. It didn't fit the episode."

== Reception ==
=== Viewers ===
In its original American broadcast, "When Men and Mountains Meet" was seen by an estimated 1.57 million household viewers with a 0.7/2 in the 18–49 demographics. This means that 0.7 percent of all households with televisions watched the episode, while 2 percent of all of those watching television at the time of the broadcast watched it. This was a 14% increase in viewership from the previous episode, which was seen by an estimated 1.37 million household viewers with a 0.6/2 in the 18–49 demographics.

=== Critical reviews ===
"When Men and Mountains Meet" received generally positive reviews from critics. Emily St. James of The A.V. Club gave the episode a "B+" grade and wrote, "“When Men And Mountains Meet” is a mostly satisfactory ending to a flawed season of a flawed series. What holds it back, really, is the fact that the bad stuff is so, so bad, without a real sense of how it will play on TV."

Alan Sepinwall of HitFix wrote, "If you went into the finale with more affection for Bill, and/or the series, perhaps you were more touched by it all. But ultimately, the show I wanted Big Love to be apparently wasn't the show Olsen and Scheffer were making. I can see that quite vividly now." Kristen Baldwin of Entertainment Weekly wrote, "as a fan of the show since day one, I think the writers pulled off an incredible feat by staging a finale that at once shocked viewers while also acknowledging what we've known all along: This show wasn't about Bill Henrickson, it was about his wives. And in the end, those three women found themselves and the meaning of family all on their own — no husband needed. Am I alone in loving it?"

James Poniewozik of TIME wrote, "With Bill’s death, we’ll never really see whether his vision for his family was doomed or sustainable while he lived. Instead, we closed on a moving if messy note for a moving if messy series: a affirmation of love, at least, in bodily form on Earth. As for what comes after? God only knows." Matt Zoller Seitz of Salon.com wrote, "Even when the series got lost in its own often-tangled and distracting subplots, it never relinquished its distinctive viewpoint on religious people living in an increasingly secular nation. We always got the sense that there was a world beyond the one we were looking at, and that everything that happened in this world was affected by, and leading toward, that other existence. Margene's final change of direction in the kitchen was a knockout, and consistent with the series' style and tone over the years."

Aileen Gallagher of Vulture wrote, "Big Love concluded its five-season run last night, with a bang and then a whimper. The closing moments of the show addressed pretty much every plot thread from the last season, but in a way so pat it took some of the fun out of the finale." Allyssa Lee of Los Angeles Times wrote, "it was the concluding sister-wife embrace in Barb’s dining room with Bill looking on, and then the tune of Natalie Maines' lovely version of the Beach Boys' classic, that choked me up in the end. When again will we see and be moved by such an indelibly drawn portrait of a messy, broken, loving family? God only knows."

TV Fanatic gave the episode a 2.5 star rating out of 5 and wrote, ""When Men and Mountains Meet," had some shocking scenes, but overall I felt disappointed with how the show ended. This was the final episode, after all, and I felt that the writers held out in some areas, while rushing to complete other storylines." Mark Blankenship of HuffPost wrote, "My journey with Big Love has been bumpy, but now that the car has stopped and I know we're not going to hit a guardrail, I'm glad I went on the ride. There were problems, yes, and fights, but all in all, the show was always engrossing. If nothing else, it demanded a response, which is more than I can say for most of the stuff on TV."

Ginia Bellafante of The New York Times wrote, "This was a man who couldn't care for his lawn or even a single wife as Bill simultaneously bed-skipped his way through three marriages. Figuratively, though, it was all of us who pulled the trigger, all of us who could never really give over our sympathies to a man who seemed to get way more than he deserved. The dictator had to go." Jace Lacob of the Daily Beast called it the "perfect way to close out this series" and described his reaction to it as "emotional".
