= Sacrament (Big Love) =

- Big Love episode
- Episode no.: Season 3 Episode 10
- Directed by: Dan Attias
- Story by: Coleman Herbert
- Teleplay by: Victoria Morrow
- Cinematography by: Alan Caso
- Editing by: Chris Figler
- Original release date: March 22, 2009
- Running time: 53 minutes

Guest appearances
- Mary Kay Place as Adaleen Grant; Željko Ivanek as J.J. Percy Walker; Charles Esten as Ray Henry; Luke Askew as Hollis Green; Anne Dudek as Lura Grant; Patrick Fabian as Ted Price; Melinda Page Hamilton as Malinda; Judith Hoag as Cindy Price; Ben Lemon as Laurel Davis; Katherine LaNasa as Beverly Ford; Sandy Martin as Selma Green; Kate Norby as Glory; Aaron Paul as Scott Quittman; Cassi Thomson as Cara Lynn Walker

Episode chronology
← Previous "Outer Darkness"	Next → "Free at Last"

"Sacrament" is the tenth episode and season finale of the third season of the American drama television series Big Love. It is the 34th overall episode of the series and was written by Victoria Morrow from a story by Coleman Herbert, and directed by consulting producer Dan Attias. It originally aired on HBO on March 22, 2009.

The series is set in Salt Lake City and follows Bill Henrickson, a fundamentalist Mormon. He practices polygamy, having Barbara, Nicki and Margie as his wives. The series charts the family's life in and out of the public sphere in their suburb, as well as their associations with a fundamentalist compound in the area. In the episode, Bill and Roman collaborate to save a young girl, while Sarah makes a big announcement.

According to Nielsen Media Research, the episode was seen by an estimated 2.73 million household viewers and gained a 1.3 ratings share among adults aged 18–49. The episode received extremely positive reviews from critics, who praised the closure to Roman's character, writing, performances and pacing.

== Plot ==
Bill (Bill Paxton) and Nicki (Chloë Sevigny) begin their separation, with Nicki preparing to leave the house. Later, Bill meets with Ray (Charles Esten) and Roman (Harry Dean Stanton), preparing for their operation to save Ted's and Cindy's daughter from the Greenes. Bill asks Ray to delay Roman's arrest until a certain time, so he cannot flee, which he reluctantly accepts.

While heading to the meeting, Bill discovers that Roman will deviate from their plan, and the meeting will take place in a different location. A confident Roman is certain his plan will work, and gives them the document, but Hollis (Luke Askew) suspects the document is false. When Roman refuses to bow before them, the Greenes refuse to release the daughter and leave the scene. Bill forces Roman to contact Selma (Sandy Martin), who agrees to meet with him to give him the daughter. Sarah (Amanda Seyfried) surprises Scott (Aaron Paul) by proposing marriage, but Barbara (Jeanne Tripplehorn) cannot give them her blessing before consulting with Bill. She is aghast when Bill actually gives them his blessing, expressing her uncertainty over their future.

At the compound, J.J. (Željko Ivanek) surprises Nicki by bringing along a young girl, Cara Lynn (Cassi Thomson), introducing her as their daughter. When Barbara visits, Nicki states that she abandoned Cara Lynn when she ended her marriage to J.J., and she is feeling lost with her new life. Margie (Ginnifer Goodwin) gets a new job as a TV pitchwoman and decides to sell her car to boost her business, angering Bill. To build awareness, she brings Nell to her TV appearance, which makes for a great impression. Bill discovers that the letter was fake, and Ray warns him to stick to the plan or he could face criminal charges.

En route to Selma's location, Bill reveals Ray's plan to Roman and gets him to leave their car to go into Bill's car. Alby (Matt Ross) decides to proceed with his plan in killing Roman, and leaves a bomb outside his hotel room, unaware that he is not inside. As Adaleen (Mary Kay Place) prepares to open, the bomb is accidentally turned on by a maid, fatally hitting Alby. Realizing that Bill knows Roman killed Kathy, she calls Roman, who in turn takes Bill hostage in the car. After getting the daughter back, Roman gets Selma to flee, unaware that Don (Joel McKinnon Miller) is following her and leading to her arrest. Roman flees back to Juniper Creek, and Alby's family quickly leaves the property.

In the aftermath, Bill tells Ted (Patrick Fabian) that he is cutting ties with him on the casino after consulting with the church. In custody, Selma testifies against Roman, finally allowing Ray to charge him with murder. At his home, Roman is shocked to find Joey awaiting him. Joey then suffocates him with a pillow, avenging Kathy's death. Bill returns home, where he gives a statement where he proclaims they are "a new church." Suddenly, Nicki arrives with Cara Lynn, and the family is delighted to see them.

== Production ==
=== Development ===
The episode was written by Victoria Morrow from a story by Coleman Herbert, and directed by consulting producer Dan Attias. This was Morrow's first writing credit, Herbert's first writing credit, and Attias' fifth directing credit.

== Reception ==
=== Viewers ===
In its original American broadcast, "Sacrament" was seen by an estimated 2.73 million household viewers with a 1.3 in the 18–49 demographics. This means that 1.3 percent of all households with televisions watched the episode. This was a 17% increase in viewership from the previous episode, which was seen by an estimated 2.30 million household viewers.

=== Critical reviews ===
"Sacrament" received extremely positive reviews from critics. Amelie Gillette of The A.V. Club gave the episode a "B+" grade and wrote, "Anyone else less than enthralled by this episode's driving narrative force, the kidnapping? The whole thing just seemed like a cheap, and not particularly interesting way of ratcheting up the drama. Though it was fun to see Selma stew with envy about Hollis' "unnatural friendship for the pretty oriental girl.""

Alan Sepinwall wrote, "After the wonderful compound-free detour that was "Come, Ye Saints," the show went very, very heavy on Juniper Creek drama for the rest of the season, and I'm so, so tired of it all. Outside of wanting a bit more backstory on Selma Green (like why Hollis allows her to dress as a man), I'd be happy to never see any of those characters again, and to just deal with the problems Bill and his wives face from the modern world."

Nick Catucci of Vulture wrote, "Bill's triumph is Big Love's triumph: His wild ambitions were like this season's wild ambitions, and somehow, both came unexpectedly to fruition. Underneath that neat bit of symmetry are planted the seeds of a new hubris for Bill; but the show itself seems just about flawless." Emily St. James of Slant Magazine wrote, "The season finales of Big Love often have a bit of an out-of-control feel to them, as though any given season's plotlines have gotten so all-encompassing that it's all the show can do to race just ahead of the giant boulder of story that threatens to overtake it at any moment. “Sacrament” managed this feat more elegantly than last season's finale, and it mostly brought the series's sporadically brilliant third season to a close, even if the finale was, itself, only sporadically brilliant."

James Poniewozik of TIME wrote, "In all, this finale episode wasn’t the emotional powerhouse that the last couple have been, probably because it sought to resolve so much in an hour, but it sets up an interesting premise for season 4." Eric Hochberger of TV Fanatic wrote, "Last night was the much hyped season three finale of Big Love and it delivered everything it promised."

Mark Blankenship of HuffPost wrote, "it's time to say goodbye to another season of the greatest drama currently on television. Yes, you guys. That's exactly what it is, and the finale proved why."
