= The Mighty and Strong =

- Big Love episode
- Episode no.: Season 4 Episode 4
- Directed by: Dan Attias
- Written by: Melanie Marnich
- Cinematography by: Alex Nepomniaschy
- Editing by: Byron Smith
- Original release date: January 31, 2010
- Running time: 59 minutes

Guest appearances
- Bruce Dern as Frank Harlow; Mary Kay Place as Adaleen Grant; Joel McKinnon Miller as Don Embry; Douglas Smith as Ben Henrickson; Adam Beach as Tommy Flute; Aaron Paul as Scott Quittman; Ben Koldyke as Dale Tomasson; Tom Amandes as Roy Colburn; Anne Dudek as Lura Grant; Michele Greene as Sheila Jackson White; Melinda Page Hamilton as Malinda; Bella Thorne as Tancy "Teenie" Henrickson; Thomas F. Wilson as Ricky Jax

Episode chronology
← Previous "Strange Bedfellows"	Next → "Sins of the Father"

"The Mighty and Strong" is the fourth episode of the fourth season of the American drama television series Big Love. It is the 38th overall episode of the series and was written by Melanie Marnich, and directed by consulting producer Dan Attias. It originally aired on HBO on January 31, 2010.

The series is set in Salt Lake City and follows Bill Henrickson, a fundamentalist Mormon. He practices polygamy, having Barbara, Nicki and Margie as his wives. The series charts the family's life in and out of the public sphere in their suburb, as well as their associations with a fundamentalist compound in the area. In the episode, Bill tries to outsmart Colburn as he prepares to announce his candidacy, while Ben and Margie face the aftermath of their TV appearance.

According to Nielsen Media Research, the episode was seen by an estimated 1.52 million household viewers and gained a 0.7/2 ratings share among adults aged 18–49. The episode received extremely positive reviews from critics, who praised the storylines and character development.

== Plot ==
As Bill (Bill Paxton) prepares to announce his candidacy, Colburn (Tom Amandes) surprises him by getting Immigration agents raid his Home Plus store under suspicion of hiding undocumented workers. To complicate matters, the agency has discovered Bill's payroll with his wives' name, although Don (Joel McKinnon Miller) promises to take care of it.

After their appearance on primetime television, Barbara (Jeanne Tripplehorn) confronts Margie (Ginnifer Goodwin) over her status with Ben (Douglas Smith), and Margie claims she "accidentally" kissed him on the lips. When Bill finds out, Margie says that it didn't mean anything, and she returns to television to refer that Ben was just a friend. In Juniper Creek, Nicki (Chloë Sevigny) is angered to discover that J.J. (Željko Ivanek) plans to marry Adaleen (Mary Kay Place). During this, J.J. tells Joey (Shawn Doyle) that he has evidence of him and Wanda (Melora Walters) digging up Roman's body, and forces him to work with him on an unspecified plan.

To help the Native American woman after the car incident, Sarah (Amanda Seyfried) decides to take care of her baby. However, Tommy (Adam Beach) suspects the woman used the Henricksons' money for drugs, alerting Barbara. When Bill discovers this, he forces Sarah and Scott (Aaron Paul) to return the baby. Scott refuses, but Sarah complies, feeling that she only stayed with the baby to cope with the miscarriage. Meanwhile, Frank (Bruce Dern) and Jodean (Mireille Enos) help Lois (Grace Zabriskie) in smuggling birds into Mexico, where they are almost caught by customs officers. Alby (Matt Ross) and Dale (Ben Koldyke) continue their affair, but feels heartbroken when he discovers that Dale is helping Bill, but Dale claims he would never betray his ideas.

Teenie (Bella Thorne) informs Bill and Barbara that she discovered Ben's letter to Margie where he professed his love for her. Bill once again confronts Ben and Margie, but Ben says it was his fault and he got over it. Outside Home Plus, Bill mounts a big ceremony to announce his candidacy, asking Lois to introduce him. However, Nicki, who is working as a spy in Colburn's campaign team, informs him that Colburn is investigating polygamy rumors in his store. In a desperate attempt to cover his lifestyle, Bill asks Don to take the blame for him. Don reluctantly accepts, confessing to his polygamy and resigning from the company to save Bill's campaign. Bill takes over the podium, to confirm his electoral run. That night, Ben decides to leave the house for a while, with Bill supporting the decision.

== Production ==
=== Development ===
The episode was written by Melanie Marnich, and directed by producer Dan Attias. This was Marnich's second writing credit, and Attias' seventh directing credit.

== Reception ==
=== Viewers ===
In its original American broadcast, "The Mighty and Strong" was seen by an estimated 1.52 million household viewers with a 0.7/2 in the 18–49 demographics. This means that 0.7 percent of all households with televisions watched the episode, while 2 percent of all of those watching television at the time of the broadcast watched it. This was a 9% decrease in viewership from the previous episode, which was seen by an estimated 1.67 million household viewers with a 0.8/2 in the 18–49 demographics.

=== Critical reviews ===
"The Mighty and Strong" received extremely positive reviews from critics. Amelie Gillette of The A.V. Club gave the episode a "B+" grade and wrote, "Bill might profess that he doesn't want to be prophet of Juniper Creek, but he's doing an awfully good Roman Grant impression."

Alan Sepinwall wrote, "There are shows with insufferable main characters where the creative teams clearly don't recognize how insufferable those characters have become. The Big Love writers, fortunately, don't have any myopia when it comes to Bill, made abundantly clear by an episode like "The Mighty and the Strong," in which Bill bullies and/or manipulates everyone around him to get what he wants (in this case, his idiotic, obviously doomed plan to run for office so he can come out of the polygamist closet) while his friends and family struggle to keep up with his megalomania." Nick Catucci of Vulture wrote, "For all the tension, awkwardness, and talk of who needs to be gelded — J.J., according to Nicki — this episode delivers on the interpersonal connection, not to mention straight-up intercourse."

James Poniewozik of TIME wrote, "the episode seemed to move forward something like eight or ten plots. But while that can be a problem for Big Love — and the season does seem rushed by its nine-episode order — it was more effective this week than last, partly because the Henricksons were together and able to play off each other." Allyssa Lee of Los Angeles Times wrote, "This episode had more nuttiness than a 10-ton Snickers. And if there really was some rule against being totally bonkers, more than half the characters would definitely be behind bars."

TV Fanatic gave the episode a 4 star rating out of 5 and wrote, "We love HBO and Big Love is one of our favorite shows on TV. But "The Mighty and Strong" had us basically screaming at the set "What?!" and "Why?!" all night long." Mark Blankenship of HuffPost wrote, "I mean it as a compliment when I say that watching Big Love always makes me feel kind of sick. Like, I get so tense every week with all the drama and the fighting and the secret loving that I wonder if I should take an aspirin. Of course, that's what I tune in for, and the latest installment, "The Mighty and the Strong," certainly keeps me in chest pain."

Dan Attias submitted this episode for consideration for Outstanding Directing for a Drama Series, while Mary Kay Place submitted it for Outstanding Guest Actress in a Drama Series at the 62nd Primetime Emmy Awards. Place was nominated, but would lose the award to Ann-Margret for Law & Order: Special Victims Unit.
