= Strange Bedfellows (Big Love) =

- Big Love episode
- Episode no.: Season 4 Episode 3
- Directed by: Adam Davidson
- Written by: Roberto Aguirre-Sacasa
- Cinematography by: Anette Haellmigk
- Editing by: Alan Cody
- Original release date: January 24, 2010
- Running time: 58 minutes

Guest appearances
- Sissy Spacek as Marilyn Densham; Harry Dean Stanton as Roman Grant; Douglas Smith as Ben Henrickson; Adam Beach as Tommy Flute; Perry King as Clark Paley; Melinda Page Hamilton as Malinda; Ben Koldyke as Dale Tomasson; Katherine LaNasa as Beverly Ford; Lawrence O'Donnell as Lee Hatcher; Bella Thorne as Tancy "Teenie" Henrickson; Misty Upham as Leila Stilwell

Episode chronology
← Previous "The Greater Good"	Next → "The Mighty and Strong"

"Strange Bedfellows" is the third episode of the fourth season of the American drama television series Big Love. It is the 37th overall episode of the series and was written by Roberto Aguirre-Sacasa, and directed by Adam Davidson. It originally aired on HBO on January 24, 2010.

The series is set in Salt Lake City and follows Bill Henrickson, a fundamentalist Mormon. He practices polygamy, having Barbara, Nicki and Margie as his wives. The series charts the family's life in and out of the public sphere in their suburb, as well as their associations with a fundamentalist compound in the area. In the episode, Bill and Nicki travel to Washington D.C., while Barbara conducts a series of seminars on sensitivity training at the casino.

According to Nielsen Media Research, the episode was seen by an estimated 1.67 million household viewers and gained a 0.8/2 ratings share among adults aged 18–49. The episode received very positive reviews from critics, although Bill's subplot received mixed reactions.

== Plot ==
Bill (Bill Paxton) and Nicki (Chloë Sevigny) travel to Washington, D.C. to land an endorsement from Congressman Clark Paley (Perry King). Bill hopes the trip can also be a romantic vacation for him and Nicki to repair their relationship, but Nicki surprises by bringing Cara Lynn (Cassi Thomson) along. Bill hopes to enter Paley's fundraiser, but gets into a conflict with a woman (Sissy Spacek) at the reception, and he made rude remarks to her.

Barbara (Jeanne Tripplehorn) conducts a series of seminars on sensitivity training at the casino, accompanied by Sarah (Amanda Seyfried). As they leave, they accidentally hit a young Native American woman and are forced to take her to the hospital. They offer her a job at the casino as compensation, but Tommy (Adam Beach) refuses due to her drug addiction. Alby (Matt Ross) and Dale (Ben Koldyke) have continued their affair, despite Dale's attempts to end it. However, Alby is tormented by the presence of Roman's ghost (Harry Dean Stanton), who admonishes his nature and decisions.

When J.J. (Željko Ivanek) tells Wanda (Melora Walters) that Joey (Shawn Doyle) could be implicated for Roman's death, they decide to exhume his tomb to clean any possible sign of Joey's DNA. J.J. also storms into the Henricksons' houses to look for Cara Lynn, as Nicki didn't inform him of her plan. Ben (Douglas Smith) makes J.J. leave, and stays with Margie (Ginnifer Goodwin) to protect her. J.J. calls Nicki, and both realize that Cara Lynn lied about J.J. giving her permission. This leads to a heated argument between Nicki and Cara Lynn, with the latter saying that Nicki failed as her mother.

Bill discovers that the woman at the reception was Marilyn Densham, Paley's political crony, and his treatment prompts her to not allow him in seeing Paley. Bill crashes an event to talk with Paley, and finally gets Marilyn to support his endorsement after she learns of his casino. The encounter is interrupted when Bill is called to the hotel, as Nicki has been arrested for possessing a gun. Bill convinces the officers in letting her go, and consoles her. Back in Utah, Margie prepares for her primetime debut to promote her "Hearts on a Sleeve" line. As Ben prepares her, she suddenly kisses him in the lips, which is witnessed by Beverly (Katherine LaNasa). During the show, Beverly deviates from the script and has the cameras point to Ben as "Margie's husband", horrifying Margie and Barbara, who was watching the live event from her house.

== Production ==
=== Development ===
The episode was written by Roberto Aguirre-Sacasa, and directed by Adam Davidson. This was Aguirre-Sacasa's second writing credit, and Davidson's third directing credit.

== Reception ==
=== Viewers ===
In its original American broadcast, "Strange Bedfellows" was seen by an estimated 1.67 million household viewers with a 0.8/2 in the 18–49 demographics. This means that 0.8 percent of all households with televisions watched the episode, while 2 percent of all of those watching television at the time of the broadcast watched it. This was a 8% increase in viewership from the previous episode, which was seen by an estimated 1.54 million household viewers with a 0.8/2 in the 18–49 demographics.

=== Critical reviews ===
"Strange Bedfellows" received very positive reviews from critics. Amelie Gillette of The A.V. Club gave the episode a "B+" grade and wrote, "One of the great things about a big, rangy, thick-with-drama show like Big Love is the way that it can sow the seeds of a plotline, then leave that plotline to grow on its own, checking in periodically to see how it's doing until, one episode, we check back in and the plotline is in full, glorious bloom."

Alan Sepinwall wrote, "Tonight's Big Love offered up a whole lot of Bill Henrickson at his most smug, stubborn and irritating, and the return of Teeny in the body of a different actress, but it also had some great interaction between Nicki and Cara Lynn, a great turn by Sissy Spacek as an influential Washington type, and some very interesting developments on the Margene front." Nick Catucci of Vulture wrote, "Game Change this episode was not, but if Bill's to convincingly make headway in this lopsided match, we suppose the show has to drag us through some of the deadly boring how-your-sausage-gets-made."

James Poniewozik of TIME wrote, "“Strange Bedfellows,” featuring Bill's trip with Nicki to Washington to seek a Congressman's endorsement, had each of the wives mostly separate, and maybe as a result, it seemed less focused than last season's outstanding road-trip episode “Come Ye Saints.” But it underscored how, for all their conflicts, each member of this plural marriage draws strength from the others. Here, each spouse, left to deal with a crisis alone, seems at to lack a crucial support." Allyssa Lee of Los Angeles Times wrote, "Sometimes, all it takes is a little connection to get things moving. Characters came together throughout this episode, titled “Strange Bedfellows” — some for the better, and some for the worse, but all of which set forward a nice, exciting momentum for the rest of the season."

TV Fanatic wrote, "Big Love is starting to get pretty crazy! And they really couldn't have picked a better name for this week's installment." Mark Blankenship of HuffPost wrote, "That balance dovetails with one of Big Love's major themes - trying to see the complexity of a different world. "Strange Bedfellows" pushes that notion to new places. Every plotline asks polygamous characters to understand the traditions and rituals of a different culture."
