= The Greater Good (Big Love) =

- Big Love episode
- Episode no.: Season 4 Episode 2
- Directed by: David Knoller
- Written by: Paul Redford
- Cinematography by: Alex Nepomniaschy
- Editing by: Chris Figler
- Original release date: January 17, 2010
- Running time: 56 minutes

Guest appearances
- Mary Kay Place as Adaleen Grant; Joel McKinnon Miller as Don Embry; Douglas Smith as Ben Henrickson; Adam Beach as Tommy Flute; Charles Esten as Ray Henry; Ben Koldyke as Dale Tomasson; Aaron Paul as Scott Quittman; Tina Majorino as Heather Tuttle; Tom Amandes as Roy Colburn; Jenni Blong as Evie; Robert Curtis Brown as Stake President Kennedy; Patrick Fabian as Ted Price; Melinda Page Hamilton as Malinda; Judith Hoag as Cindy Price; Michele Greene as Sheila Jackson White

Episode chronology
← Previous "Free at Last"	Next → "Strange Bedfellows"

"The Greater Good" is the second episode of the fourth season of the American drama television series Big Love. It is the 36th overall episode of the series and was written by co-executive producer Paul Redford, and directed by executive producer David Knoller. It originally aired on HBO on January 17, 2010.

The series is set in Salt Lake City and follows Bill Henrickson, a fundamentalist Mormon. He practices polygamy, having Barbara, Nicki and Margie as his wives. The series charts the family's life in and out of the public sphere in their suburb, as well as their associations with a fundamentalist compound in the area. In the episode, Bill surprises his family with a big announcement, while Sarah and Scott decide to get married immediately.

According to Nielsen Media Research, the episode was seen by an estimated 1.54 million household viewers and gained a 0.8/2 ratings share among adults aged 18–49. The episode received very positive reviews from critics, with Chloë Sevigny receiving praise for her performance.

== Plot ==
Bill (Bill Paxton) and Dale (Ben Koldyke) attend a hearing by State Representative Roy Coburn (Tom Amandes), who sets out to eliminate polygamy and plans to go after Juniper Creek. During a family lunch, Bill surprises the family by announcing that he will run against Coburn for the Utah State Senate. Barbara (Jeanne Tripplehorn) and Margie (Ginnifer Goodwin) oppose to his plans, as they fear this could expose their polygamy status.

As she tries to convince Bill in becoming the new Prophet, Nicki (Chloë Sevigny) discovers that Ray (Charles Esten) has decided to drop the investigation into their family and has given the files to Bill. She visits him to thank him, but is heartbroken to find that he chose to move out of Utah. To get a good image for the Senate run, Bill and Barbara ask the Church to support by claiming they dissolved their relationships. Sarah (Amanda Seyfried) and Scott (Aaron Paul) decide to get married through a justice of the peace. They ask Heather (Tina Majorino) and Ben (Douglas Smith) to serve as their witnesses, but decide not to inform Sarah's family.

Bill invites J.J. (Željko Ivanek) and his wife Malinda (Melinda Page Hamilton) to dine, where Nicki expresses disgust for J.J.'s treatment of his wife. She then surprises her family by revealing she does not plan to attend Roman's memorial. She is scolded by Adaleen (Mary Kay Place), but Nicki reaffirms that Roman was a false prophet. Joey (Shawn Doyle) surprises Bill with his return, and they reconcile after their previous arguments. Joey also tries to convince Bill into becoming the prophet, but Bill is not interested in the position. J.J. also visits Wanda (Melora Walters), revealing that he knows Joey killed Roman and asking for cooperation.

As Sarah and Heather leave for the civil ceremony, Barbara arrives early and is surprised by their plans. Sarah finally admits her marriage, and subsequently tells Bill later on. Bill is upset, but comes to understand that he got his daughter in following his lifestyle by taking this route. That night, Bill tells Barbara, Nicki and Margie that he will still run for Senate, and makes a big announcement: when elected, he will finally reveal their polygamy status, which will allow them to be more content with their lives. Bill then surprises them by revealing that Sarah and Scott will get married at their backyard. As Sarah and Scott are officially married, the family celebrates.

== Production ==
=== Development ===
The episode was written by co-executive producer Paul Redford, and directed by executive producer David Knoller. This was Redford's first writing credit, and Knoller's second directing credit.

== Reception ==
=== Viewers ===
In its original American broadcast, "The Greater Good" was seen by an estimated 1.54 million household viewers with a 0.8/2 in the 18–49 demographics. This means that 0.8 percent of all households with televisions watched the episode, while 2 percent of all of those watching television at the time of the broadcast watched it. This was a 11% decrease in viewership from the previous episode, which was seen by an estimated 1.73 million household viewers with a 0.8/2 in the 18–49 demographics.

=== Critical reviews ===
"The Greater Good" received very positive reviews from critics. Amelie Gillette of The A.V. Club gave the episode a "B+" grade and wrote, "Even if the Henricksons could keep their lifestyle a secret in the heat of a campaign and even if Bill wins, does Bill really think that the people who elected him would be a happy and supportive bunch when they find out they've been lied to? Yes, Bill really does think that. Again, because Bill is a moron. Still, this whole election thing should be pretty fun to watch. Not as fun to watch as Lois and Frank's fictional sitcom spin-off, but fun nonetheless."

Alan Sepinwall wrote, "I'm not going to have a lot to say about Big Love each week, but I thought "The Greater Good" was a really strong showcase for Chloe Sevigny, as she played Nicki's epiphanies about her marriage, her upbringing and her entire outlook on life. At the start of the series, Nicki annoyed me so much (as she was supposed to) that I kept hoping they might find a way to write her out of the show. Now I can't imagine the show without her as one of the most important figures." Nick Catucci of Vulture wrote, "If the season opener was madcap, parading a frozen Roman and culminating in a first-day casino haul to rival a bank heist, episode two gently set us on a long arc, highlighting Bill's next scheme, Margene’s hard-won independence, and Nicki's (perhaps insurmountable) heartbreak."

James Poniewozik of TIME wrote, "That's the larger, great project of Big Love: getting us to understand, in the context of a secular story told for the secular world, the workings and expressions of faith, and take them — however alien to us — seriously and sincerely. It's a tall order, and, I think, part of the reason that Big Love seems too disjointed or weird to some viewers. But it’s a great accomplishment, and it owes a lot to Sevigny, so congratulations." Allyssa Lee of Los Angeles Times wrote, "Sevigny really clinched it in the end, when Nicki, who now knows what it's like to be madly in love with someone, shed tears not so much for Sarah and Scott's union but in mourning for her own misspent life."

TV Fanatic wrote, "We are not saying we do not love the whole Henrickson family unit, but by the look of things, everything is starting to fall apart. Clearly, this season is going to be filled with drama. And we LOVE drama. What girl doesn't?" Mark Blankenship of HuffPost wrote, "can we talk about how funny this episode was? Like, how about when Margene and Barb are cleaning up after the family's oh-so-awkward dinner with J.J. and his cancer-stricken wife? There among the dirty plates, Barb frets about what it would be like to have cancer on a compound, and her main concern for the poor woman outside... is the fact that she has a terrible wig."

David Knoller submitted this episode for consideration for Outstanding Directing for a Drama Series at the 62nd Primetime Emmy Awards.
