= For Better or Worse (Big Love) =

- Big Love episode
- Episode no.: Season 3 Episode 5
- Directed by: Julie Anne Robinson
- Written by: Roberto Aguirre-Sacasa
- Cinematography by: Anette Haellmigk
- Editing by: Chris Figler
- Original release date: February 15, 2009
- Running time: 52 minutes

Guest appearances
- Bruce Dern as Frank Harlow; Mary Kay Place as Adaleen Grant; Charles Esten as Ray Henry; Branka Katić as Ana Mesovich; Anne Dudek as Lura Grant; Patrick Fabian as Ted Price; Robert Beltran as Jerry Flute; Tina Majorino as Heather Tuttle; Mark L. Young as Frankie; Jenni Blong as Evie; Lyndsy Fonseca as Donna; Mike Pniewski as Holy Priest

Episode chronology
← Previous "On Trial"	Next → "Come, Ye Saints"

"For Better or Worse" is the fifth episode of the third season of the American drama television series Big Love. It is the 29th overall episode of the series and was written by Roberto Aguirre-Sacasa, and directed by Julie Anne Robinson. It originally aired on HBO on February 15, 2009.

The series is set in Salt Lake City and follows Bill Henrickson, a fundamentalist Mormon. He practices polygamy, having Barbara, Nicki and Margie as his wives. The series charts the family's life in and out of the public sphere in their suburb, as well as their associations with a fundamentalist compound in the area. In the episode, Bill and Ana officially get married, but Ana feels pressured by the sacrifices needed to make the marriage work.

According to Nielsen Media Research, the episode was seen by an estimated 2.00 million household viewers. The episode received positive reviews from critics, who praised the closure to Ana's story arc.

== Plot ==
The plans for the casino partnership between Bill (Bill Paxton), Don (Joel McKinnon Miller) and Jerry (Robert Beltran) are awaiting approval on the gaming commission to finally start their venture. Ana (Branka Katić) finally accepts Bill's marriage proposal, and the couple gets married the following day. Due to not having planned the arrangements, Ana will have to live with Barbara (Jeanne Tripplehorn) temporarily.

As part of his release, Roman (Harry Dean Stanton) is not allowed to be in Juniper Creek, forcing him to move his family to a motel. Sarah (Amanda Seyfried) and Heather (Tina Majorino) accompany Frankie (Mark L. Young) and Ben (Douglas Smith) to Juniper Creek, so Frankie can confront Frank (Bruce Dern). Along the way, Sarah tells Heather that she plans to keep the baby and raise with Heather's help in Arizona. Reaching Frank's house, Frankie confronts him over Nita (Jenny O'Hara) and turns aggressive when Frank does not disclose details over her location. Evading the police surrounding the area, they flee the compound.

Bill convinces Ted (Patrick Fabian) in dropping anti-gaming support, if he can get Alby (Matt Ross) to sell church documents to one of his friends. He gets Alby to respect part of his deal, and Alby states he will work on it. Alby and Nicki (Chloë Sevigny) also meet with Roman, who threatens Alby in framing him for murder. He also tells Nicki that she must continue working for him, or he will inform Bill that she helped his case. Back home, Bill infuriates his wives when he decides that Ana should live with Nicki as they do not know each other very well. Ana starts to feel agitated when she realizes the amount of tasks and sacrifices she must make to live with them.

Overcome with guilt, Nicki decides to quit her job at the DA's office. To the surprise of Bill and Don, the bank decides to deny their loan. This prompts Bill to force Ted into getting the documents at a higher price, finally allowing the loan to get approved. While Ana and Barbara start to bond, Nicki gets Margie (Ginnifer Goodwin) to confront Ana over another problem, leading to an argument between the wives over how her presence impacts them. As Bill tries to solve the situation, Ana surprises by asking for the divorce.

== Production ==
=== Development ===
The episode was written by Roberto Aguirre-Sacasa, and directed by Julie Anne Robinson. This was Aguirre-Sacasa's first writing credit, and Robinson's first directing credit.

== Reception ==
=== Viewers ===
In its original American broadcast, "For Better or Worse" was seen by an estimated 2.00 million household viewers. This was a slight increase in viewership from the previous episode, which was watched by an estimated 1.91 million household viewers.

=== Critical reviews ===
"For Better or Worse" received positive reviews from critics. Amelie Gillette of The A.V. Club gave the episode a "B+" grade and wrote, "while I don't doubt that we'll most likely see Ana again — even though it feels like this season's already had two season finales, we're only about halfway through, leaving plenty of time for an Ana reappearance cameo — she's gone for now, but not without leaving her mark on the Henrickson industrial marriage complex."

Emily St. James of Slant Magazine wrote, "Few shows on TV have as many scenes that feel like they should be dream sequences but actually turn out to be reality as Big Love does. It's probably because everyone on the show has something of an impulse control problem, so things tend to spin quickly out of control. Another show would have spent most of this week building up to the wedding with Ana, but Big Love dispatched with that in the second scene." Mark Blankenship of HuffPost wrote, "Enjoy your time in the sun, Ana. Odds are you'll be off the show forever soon, but it's cool that you're leaving on top."
