= On Trial (Big Love) =

- Big Love episode
- Episode no.: Season 3 Episode 4
- Directed by: David Knoller
- Written by: Mark V. Olsen; Will Scheffer
- Cinematography by: Alan Caso
- Editing by: Byron Smith
- Original release date: February 8, 2009
- Running time: 54 minutes

Guest appearances
- Ellen Burstyn as Nancy Dutton; Daveigh Chase as Rhonda Volmer; Mary Kay Place as Adaleen Grant; Charles Esten as Ray Henry; Branka Katić as Ana Mesovich; Anne Dudek as Lura Grant; Tina Majorino as Heather Tuttle; Fay Masterson as Sandy; Stephen Spinella as Eric; F. William Parker as Judge; Kate Norby as Glory; Jenny O'Hara as Nita

Episode chronology
← Previous "Prom Queen"	Next → "For Better or Worse"

"On Trial" is the fourth episode of the third season of the American drama television series Big Love. It is the 28th overall episode of the series and was written by series creators Mark V. Olsen and Will Scheffer, and directed by executive producer David Knoller. It originally aired on HBO on February 8, 2009.

The series is set in Salt Lake City and follows Bill Henrickson, a fundamentalist Mormon. He practices polygamy, having Barbara, Nicki and Margie as his wives. The series charts the family's life in and out of the public sphere in their suburb, as well as their associations with a fundamentalist compound in the area. In the episode, Roman's trial is set to begin, and both Bill and Nicki prepare for their respective plans.

According to Nielsen Media Research, the episode was seen by an estimated 1.91 million household viewers. The episode received positive reviews from critics, who praised the conflict in the episode and performances.

== Plot ==
To calm Nicki (Chloë Sevigny) ahead of the trial, Barbara (Jeanne Tripplehorn) and Margie (Ginnifer Goodwin) decide to give their nights with Bill (Bill Paxton) to her until the trial ends. Bill also privately meets Rhonda (Daveigh Chase), convincing her in testifying against Roman (Harry Dean Stanton).

Without informing Nicki, Bill privately meets with Ray (Charles Esten), telling him he can get Alby (Matt Ross) to testify. Ray is interested, and places Rhonda and Kathy (Mireille Enos) on protective custody based on his advice. With Bill's new debts, Barbara contacts Nancy (Ellen Burstyn) for financial help. When Lois (Grace Zabriskie) arrives asking for help in her torture of Frank, Bill convinces Alby in testifying against Roman to drop any possible charges against her. Sarah (Amanda Seyfried) considers leaving the baby in adoption. However, she is not convinced that a couple is adequate, and fights with Heather (Tina Majorino) and Ben (Douglas Smith) over her plans to not get her parents involved.

After obtaining the hotel where Rhonda is staying, Nicki informs Adaleen (Mary Kay Place), who visits Rhonda to blackmail her with $30,000 into leaving. Aware that Roman is now against her, Rhonda accepts and escapes the hotel. Before the trial, Nancy visits the Henricksons to inform Barbara that her husband cannot provide her with the money. When Margie shows up with a dyed blonde hair, Nicki insults her. Angered, Margie finally reveals that the family hates Roman and are working against him. Nancy and Lois also meet Ana (Branka Katić), and are shocked when she introduces herself as Bill's new wife. As they chastise Bill, Barbara proclaims that she supports Ana and wants her to be part of their life.

At the trial, JoDean (Enos) is asked to testify. To the surprise of Bill and Joey (Shawn Doyle), she changes her testimony and claims she and Kathy were adults when they were married. Alby chooses not to testify, which allows Roman to be released on less-severe charges. As he leaves, he meets with Nicki to thank her. As he descends stairs, she pushes him down, causing minor injuries to Roman. Adaleen then presents Jodean with her son, releasing him from their custody. Rhonda is seen leaving the city for Los Angeles, with a trucker driving her.

== Production ==
=== Development ===
The episode was written by series creators Mark V. Olsen and Will Scheffer, and directed by executive producer David Knoller. This was Olsen's 16th writing credit, Scheffer's 16th writing credit, and Knoller's first directing credit.

== Reception ==
=== Viewers ===
In its original American broadcast, "On Trial" was seen by an estimated 1.91 million household viewers. This was a 27% increase in viewership from the previous episode, which was watched by an estimated 1.50 million household viewers.

=== Critical reviews ===
"On Trial" received positive reviews from critics. Amelie Gillette of The A.V. Club gave the episode a "B+" grade and wrote, "As this season of Big Love progresses, and as the grotesque underpinnings of the polygamist system as a whole are exposed in no uncertain terms, Bill is easily becoming the least likable character on this show. Barb's mother Nancy was absolutely right when she told him, "You're a dabbler. A gadfly." Although she also could have added, "A selfish jerk who's expanding his family when he has no money for the family he has now, and also the worst kind of moral relativist.""

Nick Catucci of Vulture wrote, "Oh, Rhonda. “Will it make people like me more?” she asks, wondering whether she should testify against her mummified lover. Then she plays her folk demo (which is pretty good, by the way) for a truck driver taking her in the direction of L.A. If you're cringing for her there, how to describe the feeling when the driver asks her to scoot over, to “come sit by me”?"

Emily St. James of Slant Magazine wrote, "Even in a slightly overstuffed episode like “On Trial” (have this many major plot developments shoehorned themselves into one episode in the series history?), Big Love makes room for the people in your family who are going to speak the unvarnished truth just when you need to hear it." Mark Blankenship of HuffPost gave the episode a "C" grade and wrote, "If this episode of Big Love is a little disappointing, it's partly because last week's installment was so gobsmackingly good. [...] But still, while it has some excellent moments, this episode, "On Trial," lacks the show's usual cohesion. Whereas last week's multiple plot strands were elegantly twisted around a single theme, most of the stories in this segment are sloppy."

David Knoller submitted this episode for consideration for Outstanding Directing for a Drama Series, while Mark V. Olsen and Will Scheffer submitted it for Outstanding Writing for a Drama Series at the 61st Primetime Emmy Awards.
