= Come, Ye Saints =

- Big Love episode
- Episode no.: Season 3 Episode 6
- Directed by: Dan Attias
- Written by: Melanie Marnich
- Cinematography by: Alan Caso
- Editing by: Byron Smith
- Original release date: February 22, 2009
- Running time: 54 minutes

Guest appearances
- Charles Esten as Ray Henry; Robert Beltran as Jerry Flute; Noa Tishby as Ladonna; Charlie Robinson as Baptist; Julia Campbell as Vicky Nabors; James Carraway as Uncle Morris; Miriam Flynn as Aunt Dot

Episode chronology
← Previous "For Better or Worse"	Next → "Fight or Flight"

"Come, Ye Saints" is the sixth episode of the third season of the American drama television series Big Love. It is the 30th overall episode of the series and was written by Melanie Marnich, and directed by consulting producer Dan Attias. It originally aired on HBO on February 22, 2009.

The series is set in Salt Lake City and follows Bill Henrickson, a fundamentalist Mormon. He practices polygamy, having Barbara, Nicki and Margie as his wives. The series charts the family's life in and out of the public sphere in their suburb, as well as their associations with a fundamentalist compound in the area. In the episode, Bill takes his family on a road trip to Hill Cumorah, New York.

The episode received critical acclaim, who praised its single storyline, performances and themes, with many naming it as one of the best episodes of the series. TV Guide ranked the episode No. 93 in its 2009 list of "TV's Top 100 Episodes of All Time".

== Plot ==
The Henricksons embark on a journey towards Hill Cumorah, New York, to attend the Hill Cumorah Pageant and where Bill (Bill Paxton) plans to bury a family time capsule for their future generations. Margie (Ginnifer Goodwin) has brought her mother's ashes in an urn, hoping they can leave them with her uncle within a few miles.

While stopping to visit Carthage Jail, Bill corrects the tour guide on details regarding the death of Joseph Smith. At their rooms, Nicki (Chloë Sevigny) and Bill try to have sex, only to be interrupted by Margie in a bikini, which ruins the experience for Nicki. At her bedroom, a naked Margie walks in just as Ben (Douglas Smith) is also naked, causing an embarrassing encounter. The following day, Nicki and Barbara (Jeanne Tripplehorn) accompany Margie in visiting her uncle, and she inadvertedly reveals that Bill uses Viagra. They reach the house, but Margie decides to keep the ashes when they insult her mother. During this, Sarah (Amanda Seyfried) tells Ben that she plans to raise the baby with Heather in Arizona, worrying Ben as he does not believe Heather is adequate.

Bill visits Jerry (Robert Beltran) at his casino to discuss their partnership. During this, Teenie (Jolean Wejbe) runs into a baptist (Charlie Robinson) and tries to convert him to Mormonism. The baptist turns aggressive, and questions Bill's lifestyle. Margie accidentally drops her mother's ashes in the street, as she was distracted by a note that Ben gave her where he professes his love for her. After baptizing Barbara, the family prepares to leave for the pageant. However, Bill is accidentally left behind in the woods cleaning the time capsule. He is forced to walk until a car finally picks up and reaches the family's hotel.

At the hotel, Barbara discovers Nicki's birth control pills and thinks Sarah is using them. She confronts Sarah, causing her to flee. When Teenie confronts Margie over Ben's note, Margie herself confronts Ben to reiterate they are just family. Bill arrives and as he consoles Barbara, Nicki finally reveals that the pills are hers and that she has been using it for four years. This infuriates Bill, as Nicki has ruined plans for their family. Despite the chaos, Bill still gets his family to bury the capsule in Hill Cumorah. As he prays, the family leaves for the pageant. Bill expresses doubts and uncertainty to God, claiming he is lost. Behind him, an actor playing Angel Moroni is seen performing in the sky. That night, Nicki discovers that Sarah has miscarried her baby. The following day, Nicki and Sarah tell the family of the miscarriage, and they comfort Sarah.

== Production ==
=== Development ===
The episode was written by Melanie Marnich, and directed by consulting producer Dan Attias. This was Marnich's first writing credit, and Attias' third directing credit.

== Reception ==
=== Critical reviews ===
"Come, Ye Saints" received critical acclaim. Amelie Gillette of The A.V. Club gave the episode an "A–" grade and wrote, "In addition to being thoroughly juicy, last night's episode was a great one. In a dense, thorny show like Big Love, where even the subplots have subplots, it was a refreshing change of pace to spend fifty-five minutes almost entirely with the Henricksons."

Alan Sepinwall wrote, "There are episodes of Big Love that I largely suffer through to get to the good stuff. This one (not just the family scenes, but moments like Charles Robinson's cameo as the angry preacher) was all good stuff, from start to finish." Nick Catucci of Vulture wrote, "For a minute there, it looked like Ben might get road head from the one wife who still turns Bill on. And for chrissakes, Nicki put him in a cardigan (like the lawyer's) to get hot. That angel at the end, the only thing rising around here? We're not sure Dustin would have gone with such an obvious metaphor."

Emily St. James of Slant Magazine wrote, "“Come, Ye Saints” has a lot going on, but it never feels overstuffed as some other episodes have this season, perhaps because it doesn't try to shove in a plot at the Juniper Creek compound. It moves with a calm grace of its own as the characters retrace the steps of their ancestors, chased across the country and into the wilderness by angry mobs aplenty. It's a deeply moving tribute to the idea that a big family can be both a hindrance and, in times of trial, a salvation. It's easily Big Love's best episode ever, and, if we're being honest, one of the best television episodes I've seen in a long, long time." Mark Blankenship of HuffPost wrote, ""Come, Ye Saints" is never about power. Instead, playwright Melanie Marnich, writing her first segment for the series, undoes some of the biggest secrets in the Henrickson family. And when they're out in the open, secrets just aren't powerful anymore. When secrets are out in the open, everyone is vulnerable, so everyone is on an equal playing field. Everyone realizes they need each other to survive."

Dan Attias submitted this episode for consideration for Outstanding Directing for a Drama Series, while Melanie Marnich submitted it for Outstanding Writing for a Drama Series at the 61st Primetime Emmy Awards.

The episode was named among the best TV episodes of 2009. The Futon Critic named it the ninth best TV episode, TIME named it the third best, and Entertainment Weekly ranked it first.
