= Exorcism (Big Love) =

- Big Love episode
- Episode no.: Season 5 Episode 9
- Directed by: Adam Davidson
- Written by: Roberto Aguirre-Sacasa
- Cinematography by: Rob Sweeney
- Editing by: Howard Leder
- Original release date: March 13, 2011
- Running time: 57 minutes

Guest appearances
- Bruce Dern as Frank Harlow; Daveigh Chase as Rhonda Volmer; Gregory Itzin as Senator Barn; Audrey Wasilewski as Pam Martin; Jenni Blong as Evie; Christian Campbell as Greg Ivey; Tina Majorino as Heather Tuttle; Sandy Martin as Selma Green; Romy Rosemont as Monica Swanson; Gary Weeks as Sheriff Dent

Episode chronology
← Previous "The Noose Tightens"	Next → "When Men and Mountains Meet"

"Exorcism" is the ninth episode of the fifth season of the American drama television series Big Love. It is the 52nd overall episode of the series and was written by co-producer Roberto Aguirre-Sacasa, and directed by Adam Davidson. It originally aired on HBO on March 13, 2011.

The series is set in Salt Lake City and follows Bill Henrickson, a fundamentalist Mormon. He practices polygamy, having Barbara, Nicki and Margie as his wives. The series charts the family's life in and out of the public sphere in their suburb, as well as their associations with a fundamentalist compound in the area. In the episode, Bill seeks to protect his family while Alby goes on the run, while Nicki and Cara Lynn get into a heated argument.

According to Nielsen Media Research, the episode was seen by an estimated 1.37 million household viewers and gained a 0.6/2 ratings share among adults aged 18–49. The episode received mixed reviews from critics, who questioned the writing and pacing, although some praised the closure to the Juniper Creek's story arc.

== Plot ==
With Alby (Matt Ross) on the run, Bill (Bill Paxton) decides to install security in his house and asks his wives to not leave until the situation is solved. He decides to pull funding from Juniper Creek, and later leads a construction site to tear down the UEB's headquarters.

When Cara Lynn (Cassi Thomson) makes it clear she will not stop contacting Greg (Christian Campbell), Nicki (Chloë Sevigny) considers sending her to a boarding school. Suspecting that Adaleen (Mary Kay Place) is aiding Alby, Nicki asks Evie (Jenni Blong) to spy on her. Margie (Ginnifer Goodwin) tells Pam (Audrey Wasilewski) that she has left Goji, and offers to pay her the money she invested to get her out. However, she is shaken upon learning that Pam and Carl are undergoing a separation. Rhonda (Daveigh Chase) tells Ben (Douglas Smith) they should get married, and later tells Heather (Tina Majorino) about their one night stand. Barbara (Jeanne Tripplehorn) surprises her family by attending a new church as she prepares for her priesthood, with Bill wondering if she is not prioritizing the principle.

Alby is revealed to be hiding at a house provided by Selma Green (Sandy Martin). She offers him and Adaleen a safe passage to Mexico, but Alby plans to exact revenge on Bill first, and he asks Adaleen to kill Bill as she is unsuspected. The Henricksons get into an argument when the boarding school representatives arrive to take Cara Lynn, and Nicki angers Bill by comparing her relationship to Bill's case. Frank (Bruce Dern) visits Lois (Grace Zabriskie) at her nursing home, where she asks him to help her escape. He signs her out and takes her to Alby's house, causing Bill and Barbara to leave for Juniper Creek and get her, where they have another argument over her priesthood.

As they return, Bill and Barbara find Alby and Adaleen at a gas station. Bill chases Alby, but is forced to leave the chase when he hears a gunshot. Barbara has taken the gun from Adaleen, and the latter is arrested. Nicki tells Cara Lynn that Greg has been reported, and calls her a manipulative liar unable to love, causing a heartbroken Cara Lynn to burn her books. Nicki laments having failed as a mother, and Bill comforts her. Later, Barbara, Nicki and Margie visit Bill at the Capitol to dine. Alby enters the building and gunshots are heard. As Bill checks the hallways armed, he finally encounters Alby. Distracted by Margie's presence, Alby shoots at a door, allowing Bill to shoot him in the shoulder. Despite Nicki asking him to kill Alby, Bill spares him and awaits for authorities to arrive.

== Production ==
=== Development ===
The episode was written by co-producer Roberto Aguirre-Sacasa, and directed by Adam Davidson. This was Aguirre-Sacasa's third writing credit, and Davidson's fifth directing credit.

== Reception ==
=== Viewers ===
In its original American broadcast, "Exorcism" was seen by an estimated 1.37 million household viewers with a 0.6/2 in the 18–49 demographics. This means that 0.6 percent of all households with televisions watched the episode, while 2 percent of all of those watching television at the time of the broadcast watched it. This was a slight increase in viewership from the previous episode, which was seen by an estimated 1.36 million household viewers with a 0.6/2 in the 18–49 demographics.

=== Critical reviews ===
"Exorcism" received mixed reviews from critics. Emily St. James of The A.V. Club gave the episode a "B–" grade and wrote, "There are plenty of good moments and storylines in “Exorcism,” but the good half is balanced out by a half that feels sort of like a long, slow exhale, all of the air going out of the show for no particular reason, as though the series ramped up the tension in episode eight, then abruptly realized it had TWO more episodes to fill, not just the one."

Alan Sepinwall of HitFix wrote, "So as I watched the characters go through their familiar patterns, I mainly had to ask myself why I was still watching after all these years and all this frustration. My hope, I guess, is that Bill gets what's coming to him in the finale, but the problem with a character like Bill is that even if he goes to prison for 20 years, he'll just think of himself as a martyr to the cause." James Poniewozik of TIME wrote, "Is there a puddle in front of my TV? “Exorcism” may well qualify as Big Love's cryingest episode of all time; it seemed as if hardly a character managed to get through a scene without red-rimmed eyes. Yet for all the tears, the exceedingly busy episode did not convey a sense of grieving or sadness exactly as of horror and dread: we were looking at characters who feel they may be facing the end, if not already past it. There were tears of frustration and despair and exhaustion, and then that most efficient of catharses: gunfire."

Aileen Gallagher of Vulture wrote, "Before a story resolves, it must climax. With just one episode left of Big Love, the Henricksons' war with the Grant family finally ends with a shoot-out in the state capitol. But even with Alby gone, the Henricksons' future remains uncertain." Allyssa Lee of Los Angeles Times wrote, "It's the second-to-last episode, Big Love fans, and another hour with my stomach spent in knots. This one, called “Exorcism,” was where all the demons came out to play."

TV Fanatic gave the episode a 4 star rating out of 5 and wrote, "Big Love brought all the drama and left very little anticipation for the series finale on "Exorcism," as Alby became a wanted man, but that did not stop him from his one mission: kill Bill." Mark Blankenship of HuffPost wrote, "Those two problems - logical lapses and character inconsistency - plague this episode. They've plagued the entire season, really, but this episode is so frantic, so full of plot lines that have to be wrapped up nownownow that the problems are impossible to ignore. It strikes me that things are happening because the creative team has decided they should happen and not because they flow naturally from the story we've been told."
