= Rough Edges (Big Love) =

- Big Love episode
- Episode no.: Season 3 Episode 8
- Directed by: Dan Attias
- Written by: Mark V. Olsen; Will Scheffer
- Cinematography by: Alan Caso
- Editing by: Chris Figler
- Original release date: March 8, 2009
- Running time: 48 minutes

Guest appearances
- Mary Kay Place as Adaleen Grant; Željko Ivanek as J.J.; Charles Esten as Ray Henry; Luke Askew as Hollis Green; Robert Beltran as Jerry Flute; Garrett M. Brown as Bishop Devery; Anne Dudek as Lura Grant; Patrick Fabian as Ted Price; Judith Hoag as Cindy Price; Sandy Martin as Selma Green

Episode chronology
← Previous "Fight or Flight"	Next → "Outer Darkness"

"Rough Edges" is the eighth episode of the third season of the American drama television series Big Love. It is the 32nd overall episode of the series and was written by series creators Mark V. Olsen and Will Scheffer, and directed by consulting producer Dan Attias. It originally aired on HBO on March 8, 2009.

The series is set in Salt Lake City and follows Bill Henrickson, a fundamentalist Mormon. He practices polygamy, having Barbara, Nicki and Margie as his wives. The series charts the family's life in and out of the public sphere in their suburb, as well as their associations with a fundamentalist compound in the area. In the episode, Bill sends Don on a road trip to investigate a tribal "grudge" involving the casino, while Joey sets out to find the reason behind Kathy's death.

The episode received critical acclaim, who praised the tone, writing and performances.

== Plot ==
Ben (Ben Smith) accompanies Wanda (Melora Walters) and Lois (Grace Zabriskie) in preparing Kathy's body for her funeral. Bill (Bill Paxton) and a grieving Joey (Shawn Doyle) visit Ray (Charles Esten) to prosecute Roman (Harry Dean Stanton) for Kathy's death, but Ray states that the lack of evidence will not get the jury on their side. During this, Bill confesses that he is related to Roman as he is married to Nicki (Chloë Sevigny).

Bill is upset when Jerry (Robert Beltran) says that their plans are in jeopardy as their casino licence has been revoked, as the tribal commission has been in a "grudge" with the Ute people. Without having more details, Bill gets Don (Joel McKinnon Miller) to drive all the way to the reservation and investigate. Don discovers that Ted (Patrick Fabian) is behind the hold-up, as he is not content with Bill's actions. That night, Bill hires two thugs to steal vital documents from Ted's office, which corroborates the existence of the letter. He privately confronts Ted to get him to pull back on the hold-up, or he will expose Ted's involvement in the letter.

Nicki visits Ray (Charles Esten) to apologize for their kiss, but instead lies claiming that her relationship with another man is over. Margie (Ginnifer Goodwin) decides to work with Jerry's wife on a start-up business selling bracelets from the reservation. However, she is taken aback when Ray visits her house with flowers, believing Nicki lives there. Fed up, Margie forces Nicki to come to her house and explain everything. Nicki finally reveals her real name and connection to Roman, disgusting Ray, who immediately deduces Margie is Bill's wife as well. He starts leaving, and he is spotted by Bill and Barbara (Jeanne Tripplehorn). Ray correctly deduces that Barbara is also Bill's wife, and exposes Nicki's role in Roman's release, shocking the family. Despite her pleas, Ray leaves and the Henricksons are angry with Nicki's actions.

The family attends Kathy's funeral in Juniper Creek, where they are joined by Wanda's brother J.J. (Željko Ivanek). At the reception, Bill confronts Alby (Matt Ross) for conspiring with Ted, which he denies. Roman arrives, and Joey openly accuses him of killing Kathy. Nicki asks Roman for help in having Adaleen (Mary Kay Place) speak on her behalf, but he ignores her pleas. As the Henricksons leave, Nicki decides to stay with Joey and Wanda, but Joey refuses to let her stay. At his office, Bill is confronted by Hollis (Luke Askew) and his henchmen over the report. When Bill states the report is missing from his vault, he is estrangled. Don witnesses this and pulls the fire alarm, forcing Hollis and his men to flee. Don tells Bill he took the report, hoping this could win over his wives, but they still rejected him, prompting Bill to console him. Back in Juniper Creek, Nicki decides to stay with Alby at his house.

== Production ==
=== Development ===
The episode was written by series creators Mark V. Olsen and Will Scheffer, and directed by consulting producer Dan Attias. This was Olsen's 17th writing credit, Scheffer's 17th writing credit, and Attias' fourth directing credit.

== Reception ==
=== Critical reviews ===
"Rough Edges" received critical acclaim. Kyle Ryan of The A.V. Club gave the episode an "A" grade and wrote, "Only two episodes remain in Nicki's Season, as I'm hereby labeling Big Love's third. Tonight's episode ended at a critical moment: Will Nicki, who enjoyed a tantalizing taste of normal life via DA Ray, give up or persevere? She's already so ensconced in bitterness that I could easily see her resigning to life on the compound or back with Bill, each soul-crushing in different ways. But Nicki has also shown a strong desire to break from what life has given her — what that would mean for the Henricksons remains to be seen. Damned if it doesn't make for some compelling television."

Nick Catucci of Vulture wrote, "While not exactly apocalyptic in the manner of The Road or CNBC, this episode nevertheless has virtually everyone reverting to savage modes, reconnecting with their fundamental, tribal beings." Emily St. James of Slant Magazine wrote, "“Rough Edges” just plunges forward, pell-mell, not terribly concerned with if it makes a lot of sense (that Woodruff letter storyline still feels dropped in from another series entirely, Mormon content notwithstanding) but having a good time going ahead anyway."

Mark Blankenship of HuffPost wrote, "This week, the show centered less on the fight for control than on families blowing apart. Everywhere you looked, there was fallout, so this week's First Wife is the woman who shoveled the most warheads on the fire." Eric Hochberger of TV Fanatic wrote, "On last night's Big Love, the backdrop for the episode was set at the funeral for Roman's wife-to-be, Kathy. As with the case of any family with as much drama as the Henricksons, the funeral was only a small part of the episode."
