= On Trial =

On Trial may refer to:

- On Trial (1917 film), an American silent film directed by James Young
- On Trial (1928 film), an American film directed by Archie Mayo
- On Trial (1939 film), an American film directed by Terry O. Morse
- On Trial (1954 film), a French-Italian film directed by Julien Duvivier
- On Trial, the original title of 1955-59 American anthology TV series The Joseph Cotten Show: On Trial
- On Trial, a 1914 play by Elmer Rice
- On Trial (Big Love), an episode of the American TV series Big Love
- "On Trial" (Upstairs, Downstairs), the first episode of the British TV series Upstairs, Downstairs, aired 1971
- On Trial UK, an English punk rock band
