= Greater good =

Greater good may refer to:

== Film and television ==
- The Greater Good (film), a 2011 film regarding adverse reactions to vaccines
- Spooks: The Greater Good, a 2015 film based on the Spooks TV series
- The Greater Good (Big Love)
- "Greater Good" (CSI: NY)
- "The Greater Good" (House)
- "The Greater Good" (Lost)
- "The Greater Good" (Stargate Universe)
- "The Greater Good" (Wing and a Prayer)

== Music ==
- The Greater Good, or the Passion of Boule de Suif, an opera by Stephen Hartke
- A Greater Good (History 1998–2008), an album by Neuroticfish
- "The Greater Good", a song by Nine Inch Nails from Year Zero

== See also ==
- Common good
- Greater Good Science Center, a research center at the University of California, Berkeley
- Utilitarianism
