= On Trial UK =

British punk rock band

On Trial UK is an English punk rock band formed in 2004 under the name of On Trial in Wessex, England. They became The On Trial Organisation for a while before settling on the name On Trial UK in 2011. They play in many styles but are generally described as punk sounding and with punk ideologies. They have played live all over the UK and Europe including Spain, the Netherlands and Germany. They have recorded four studio albums and two EPs with a free single CD coming free with one of them.

They joined up with Headcheck Records for the 2014 release of the album The Reward Network, and continued this relationship with the 2016 release of Look Directly into the Sun.

The line ups have changed greatly over the years with only one constant member: Jonny Wah Wah, the front man.

== Current line-up ==
- Jonny Wah Wah- Vocals
- Fuzz - Guitar
- Doug Rosario - Bass
- Bruce - Drums

They have played many festivals including Rebellion Festival Guildford Festival and have been featured in many magazines including Vive Le Rock and Louder Than War.

== Discography ==
- The On Trial Organisation (CD EP) (2004)
- Living in Fear (CD EP) (2007)
- "The Fear" (CD single) (2007)
- "Living Hell" (CD single) (2009)
- Crack in a Box (CD album) (2010)
- Neuro Law (CD album) (2012)
- The Reward Network (CD album) (2014)
- Look Directly into the Sun (CD album) (2016)
