= Melanie Marnich =

American playwright and television writer

- Education: University of Minnesota (BA); University of California, San Diego (MFA)
- Occupations: Television writer, Television producer, Playwright
- Spouse: Lee Blessing
- Writing career
- Notable works: A Sleeping Country, Quake, Big Love, The Affair, The OA

Melanie Marnich is an American television writer-producer and playwright. She co-created and serves as executive producer and co-showrunner for the upcoming Amazon series, The Expatriates. She has written for Big Love on HBO; Her episode, “Come, Ye Saints” for Big Love, earned her a Writers Guild of America Award nomination for best drama episode. It was also named Best Television Episode of 2009 by Entertainment Weekly, rated third in TIME Magazine's list of 10 Best TV episodes of 2009, and ranked in TV Guide's 100 Best Episodes of All Time.

== Early life ==
Marnich was born in Duluth, Minnesota, the only child of Mike and Mary (Fracassi). Her father worked for U.S. Steel, first in the company's Cement Plant, then later in the mines in northern Minnesota. Her mother worked as a secretary, eventually becoming the office manager for the local Teamsters office. Her father's parents immigrated from Yugoslavia. Her mother's parents came from Italy.

Marnich attended the University of Minnesota, Minneapolis, where she earned her bachelor's degree in journalism. After graduation, she worked as an award-winning copywriter in Minneapolis and then Cincinnati. She left her advertising career to attend the University of California, San Diego (UCSD), where she earned her M.F.A. in Playwriting.

== Career ==
After graduating from UCSD, two of Marnich's plays written while she was a graduate student were launched nationally. Her play Quake premiered at the Actors Theatre of Louisville's Humana Festival of New American Plays in 2001. In that same year, her play Blur premiered at Manhattan Theatre Club.

Her plays have been produced at Manhattan Theatre Club, The Kennedy Center, Dallas Theater Center, Baltimore Center Stage, Steppenwolf Theatre Company and The Actors Theatre of Louisville's Humana Festival of New American Plays. She is a member of The Playwrights’ Center and an alumnus of New Dramatists. She also serves on the board of trustees for the Humanitas Foundation.

Her other plays include: Tallgrass Gothic (premiere: Actors Theatre of Louisville's Humana Festival of New American Plays); Cradle of Man (premiere: Victory Gardens Theater); These Shining Lives (premiere: Baltimore Center Stage); and A Sleeping Country (premiere: Cincinnati Playhouse in the Park).

Marnich began writing for television when she joined the HBO drama Big Love as staff writer for the show's third season. She remained on that show through its fifth and final season. Since, she worked on Showtime's The Big C and The Affair (as co-executive producer); and for AMC's Low Winter Sun. She also served as co-executive producer on The OA for Netflix. She has developed work with HBO, AMC, Silver Pictures, Amblin, Scott Free and TNT, and Amazon.

=== Personal life ===
Marnich is married to playwright Lee Blessing. They reside in Los Angeles.

== Filmography ==
=== Television ===
==== Production staff ====
| Year | Title | Role | Notes |
|---|---|---|---|
| 2009 | Big Love | Staff Writer | Season 3 |
| 2010 | Big Love | Story Editor | Season 4 |
| 2011 | Big Love | Co-producer | Season 5 |
| 2011 | The Big C | Co-producer | Season 2 |
| 2012 | The Big C | Producer | Season 3 |
| 2013 | The Big C | Consulting Producer | Season 4 |
| 2013 | Low Winter Sun | Supervising Producer | Season 1 |
| 2014 | The Affair | Co-executive Producer | Season 1 |
| 2016 | The OA | Co-executive Producer | Season 1 |
| 2019 | The Son | Consulting Producer | Season 2 |
| 2024 | Apples Never Fall | Showrunner | Series |

==== Writer ====
| Year | Show | Season | Episode | Episode Number | Original Airdate | Notes |
|---|---|---|---|---|---|---|
| 2009 | Big Love | 3 | "Come, Ye Saints" | 6 | February 22, 2009 | |
| 2010 | Big Love | 4 | "The Mighty And Strong" | 4 | January 31, 2010 | |
| 2011 | Big Love | 5 | "The Oath" | 4 | February 6, 2011 | |
| 2011 | The Big C | 2 | "Cats and Dogs" | 5 | July 25, 2011 | |
| 2011 | The Big C | 2 | "Fight or Flight" | 11 | September 12, 2011 | |
| 2012 | The Big C | 3 | "Face Off" | 5 | May 6, 2012 | |
| 2013 | The Big C | 4 | "You Can't Take It With You" | 2 | May 6, 2013 | Written by Cara DiPaolo & Melanie Marnich |
| 2013 | Low Winter Sun | 1 | "There Was a Girl" | 7 | September 22, 2013 | |
| 2014 | The Affair | 1 | "4" | 4 | November 2, 2014 | |
| 2014 | The Affair | 1 | "8" | 8 | December 7, 2014 | Written by Dan LeFranc & Melanie Marnich |
| 2014 | The Affair | 1 | "9" | 9 | December 14, 2014 | Teleplay by Melanie Marnich & Kate Robin (Story by Dan LeFranc) |
| 2016 | The OA | 1 | "New Colossus" | 2 | December 16, 2016 | |
| 2016 | The OA | 1 | "Forking Paths" | 6 | December 16, 2016 | |
| 2019 | The Son | 2 | "Hot Oil" | 5 | May 25, 2019 | |

== Awards and nominations ==
| Year | Award | Category | Work | Result |
|---|---|---|---|---|
| 2010 | Writers Guild of America Award | Best Episodic Drama | Big Love | Nominated |
| 2015 | Writers Guild of America Award | Best New Series | The Affair | Nominated |
| 2015 | Golden Globe Awards | Best TV Drama | The Affair | Winner |

=== Playwriting awards ===
The Francesca Primus Prize (Denver Center Theatre); the Mickey Kaplan New American Play Prize (Cincinnati Playhouse in the Park); the Carbonell Award for Best New Work of the Year; two McKnight Advancement Grants and two Jerome Fellowships (The Playwrights’ Center); the Melvoin Award (Northlight Theatre); and the Samuel Goldwyn Writing Award.
