= Patricia Breen =

American television writer and producer

- Born: United States
- Occupations: Television writer, producer
- Years active: 2002–present

Patricia Breen is an American television writer and producer, who has worked on a range of shows including Frasier and the acclaimed HBO polygamy drama Big Love.

== Career ==
Breen began her writing career on the tenth season of Frasier. She worked as a story editor on the eleventh and final season while also contributing two scripts. In 2006 she wrote a pilot script for ABC called Pink Collar starring Alicia Silverstone. The pilot was not successful in securing a series order. In 2009 she joined the writing staff of Big Love for its third season. She was a co-producer in season four and a producer in its fifth and final season. She contributed one script each season.

== Television episodes by Breen ==
=== Frasier ===
- We Two Kings (10.10)
- Some Assembly Required (10.19)
- Sea Bea Jeebies (11.10)
- Frasier-Lite (11.12)

=== Big Love ===
- Fight of Flight (3.7)
- Next Ticket Out (4.8)
- The Special Relationship (5.5)

=== Suburgatory ===
- Don’t Call Me Shirley (1.4)
- The Nutcracker (1.9)
- The Body (1.14)
- Entering Eden (1.19)
- Black Thai (2.8)
- T-Ball & Sympathy (2.14)
- Brown Trembler (2.18)

=== Accolades ===
Year	Award	Category	Nominee(s)	Result	Ref.
2022	Peabody Awards	Entertainment	Somebody Somewhere	Nominated	
