= Ben Lemon =

American actor

- Born: Tarrytown, New York, U.S.

Ben Lemon is an American actor. He has worked in film and television since 1989. His most notable role may be in the Star Trek: The Next Generation episode "Violations" as the villainous Jev. His other TV appearances include 90210 (2013), House M.D. (2011), Desperate Housewives (2010), The Practice (1997), and Married... with Children (1990) among others.

== Filmography ==
- Die Hard 2 (1990) - Sergeant (Blue Light Team)
- Hot Shots! Part Deux (1993) - Team 2 Leader
- Weekend at Bernie's II (1993) - New York Cop #2
- Liar Liar (1997) - Randy
- Counting for Thunder (2015) - Dr. Jim
