= David Knoller =

American television producer, director, and writer

David Knoller is a television producer, director and writer who has worked on several TV series including Carnivàle, Power, Big Love, Freaks and Geeks, Lovecraft Country and The Changeling.

== Early life and education ==
David Knoller grew up in Los Angeles, California. He is a graduate of California State University, Northridge.

== Career ==
Knoller has worked on several TV series, including Lovecraft Country, Carnivàle, Power, Big Love, Freaks and Geeks, Alan Ball's Here and Now and is the executive producer of the Apple series 12 12 12 . He received both a CableACE and NAACP Image Award for Best Dramatic Special for the period film America's Dream, along with Golden Globe and Emmy nominations for Big Love.

== Personal life ==
Knoller is married to Emmy Award winning producer Wendy Knoller.
