= Eileen Myers =

American television writer and producer

- Born: United States
- Occupations: Television writer, producer
- Years active: 2006–present

Eileen Myers is an American television writer and producer, who has worked on shows like Big Love, Dark Blue and Hung.

== Career ==
Myers began her television career on Big Love and remained a writer and producer on the series until its fourth season in 2010. She also contributed scripts for the Jerry Bruckheimer series Dark Blue and served as a writer and supervising producer on the HBO comedy-drama series Hung. In recently, she is the co-creator, writer and executive producer of the upcoming MGM+ series American Hostage which will premiere in fall 2026.

== Filmography ==
Key
†	Denotes television productions that have not yet been released

Year(s)	Title	Creator	Writer	Executive Producer	Notes
2006–10	Big Love	No	Yes	Co-producer	
2009	Dark Blue	No	Yes	Producer	
2010–11	Hung	No	Yes	Supervising	
2012	Last Resort	No	Yes	Consulting	
2014	Masters of Sex	No	Yes	Consulting	
2015	Mad Dogs	No	Yes	Co-executive	
2017	When We Rise	No	Story	No	
2026–present	The Night Agent	No	Yes	Co-executive	
2026	American Hostage †	Yes	Yes	Yes	
