= Anette Haellmigk =

German cinematographer

Anette Haellmigk is a German cinematographer who has been nominated for multiple Emmy and ASC Awards. She has been a cinematographer on Game of Thrones, The West Wing, and Insecure, amongst others.

== Career ==
Although having little family background in the creative arts Haellmigk decided to apply to art schools after high school, without success. After finding work in German television documentaries she came to know cinematographer Jost Vacano (an Oscar-nominee for Das Boot,) who became a mentor to her. He brought Haellmigk into the camera departments on The Neverending Story as well as five films directed by Paul Verhoeven.

After working as a second unit director of photography for ten years Haellmigk began working in American television when director Alex Graves hired her as his DP for three episodes of The West Wing. She first worked for HBO on Big Love, where she was tasked with changing the look of the show for its third season. She would work with HBO additionally on Game of Thrones (again with Graves) and Insecure. Her work on Game of Thrones brought her two Emmy nominations and three ASC Award nominations.

In June 2012 Haellmigk received the Kodak Vision Award.
