= James Poniewozik =

American journalist and television critic (born 1968)

- Born: July 12, 1968 (age 58); Monroe, Michigan, U.S.
- Education: University of Michigan; New York University
- Occupations: Journalist; television critic
- Years active: 1997–present

James Poniewozik (/pɒnəˈwɒzɪk/; born July 12, 1968) is an American journalist and television critic. He is the chief TV critic for The New York Times. Earlier in his career, he wrote Time's Tuned In column for 16 years.

== Early life ==
Originally from Monroe, Michigan, Poniewozik's father was Catholic and of Polish descent. His mother was Jewish from a Sephardi background from Morocco. Poniewozik attended the University of Michigan, Ann Arbor, graduating in 1990 with a BA in English. He subsequently attended but did not complete the graduate program in fiction writing at New York University.

== Career ==
Poniewozik has contributed to publications such as The New York Times Book Review, Fortune, and Rolling Stone. From 1997 to 1999, he was the media critic and editor of the media section at Salon.

Poniewozik was Time magazine's television critic from 1999 to 2015. In 2005, he began writing Time's first blog, Tuned In, a commentary on television and related media. His work at Time has been called "one of the most prominent voices analyzing the modern TV revolution today." In August 2015, it was announced that he would join The New York Times's culture desk as chief television critic.

Liveright published his book Audience of One: Donald Trump, Television, and the Fracturing of America in September 2019.

== Personal life ==
Poniewozik lives in Brooklyn. He attended church as a child, and became an atheist as a teenager; he has since described himself as "culturally Jewish".
