= Sarah Henrickson =

- Big Love character
- Portrayed by: Amanda Seyfried
- First appearance: "Pilot" (1.1)
- Last appearance: "Next Ticket Out" (4.8) (as Regular) "When Men and Mountains Meet" (5.10) (as Special Guest Star)
- Created by: Mark V. Olsen
In-universe information
- Other names: Sarah Elizabeth Henrickson (birth name)
- Father: Bill Henrickson
- Mother: Barbara Henrickson
- Stepmother: Nicki Grant; Margene Heffman
- Brothers: Ben Henrickson
- Sisters: Tancy Henrickson
- Half-brothers: Raymond Henrickson; Wayne Henrickson; Aaron Henrickson; Lester Henrickson; Unnamed Half Brother
- Half-sisters: Nell Henrickson
- Spouse: Scott Quittman
- Sons: Bill Quittman
- Other relatives: Joey Henrickson (uncle via Bill); Joey Jr. Henrickson (cousin via Joey); Alby Grant (uncle via Nicki); Cindy Dutton (aunt via Barb); Maggie Henrickson (aunt via Bill)

Wayne Henrickson
In-universe information
- Other names: Wayne Grant
- Father: Bill Henrickson
- Mother: Nicki Grant
- Stepmother: Barbara Henrickson; Margene Heffman
- Brothers: Raymond Henrickson
- Half-brothers: Ben Henrickson; Aaron Henrickson; Lester Henrickson; Unnamed Half Brother
- Half-sisters: Sarah Henrickson; Cara Lynn Walker; Tancy Henrickson; Nell Henrickson

Aaron Henrickson
In-universe information
- Other names: Aaron Heffman
- Father: Bill Henrickson
- Mother: Margene Heffman
- Stepmother: Barbara Henrickson; Nicki Grant
- Brothers: Lester Henrickson
- Sisters: Nell Henrickson
- Half-brothers: Ben Henrickson; Raymond Henrickson; Wayne Henrickson; Unnamed Half Brother
- Half-sisters: Sarah Henrckson; Tancy Henrickson

Sarah Elizabeth Henrickson is a character on the HBO series Big Love. She is portrayed by Amanda Seyfried. Sarah is the eldest child of Bill Henrickson with his first and legal wife Barbara Henrickson. Though only a supporting character in the first two seasons, Sarah became popular in the show in its third season until actress Amanda Seyfried decided to depart the show to focus on her movie career at the end of season four. She returned in the series finale in the last scene.

== Biography ==
=== Season 1 ===
Sarah, age 16 in season 1, struggles with the choices her parents made when she was a child to follow the fundamentalist principle of polygamy. She works in a fast food restaurant and meets Heather, who becomes her best friend who knows her secret. Sarah always hated polygamy and rejects the idea of becoming involved in polygamy in her own romantic relationships. In the season finale, everybody knows about her family secret.

=== Season 2 ===
In the second season she joins a support group for ex-Mormons. There she meets Scott, who is 10 years older than she is, and the two date.

=== Season 3 ===
Sarah and Scott have a rocky relationship. In the second episode she breaks up with Scott and learns she is pregnant, but she doesn't tell him. She eventually wants to go to prom and takes Ben and her young uncle, Frankie, as their dates to her and Heather. In the end of the episode, she tells Ben the truth about her teen pregnancy. Sarah has no idea what to do with the baby. In the sixth episode Come, Ye Saints, when the Henricksons take a trip, Barb accuses Sarah of taking birth control pills. At the end of the episode Sarah miscarries her baby. She decides not to attend college, a decision that ends her friendship with Heather temporarily. In the ninth episode, Scott shows up at her house to try to see her and is told to leave by her father. However, in the season 3 finale, Sarah asks Scott to marry her and he accepts. Margene is excited, Barb and Ben are opposed, and Bill, reluctant at first, eventually agrees to give his blessing, saying he has no other choice.

=== Season 4 ===
Sarah and Scott are married in the second episode, in a secular ceremony in the communal backyard of the Henricksons' homes, conducted by a Justice of the Peace. Scott goes away for business and Sarah takes it upon herself to help a Native American girl who is a drug abuser. She and Scott go on their honeymoon to Portland. In the eighth episode "Next Ticket Out" she shocks the family by telling them that she and Scott will leave Utah to move to Portland to start a new life together. Bill at first doesn't agree, but at the end, he lets her go along with Barb, Nicki and Margene. She left after Teenie's birthday.

=== Season 5 ===
Sarah doesn't return to the fifth season as regular, but returns in the series finale in the last scene of the show. Her appearance was shown 11 months after Bill dies. She and Scott are still married and they have a baby named Bill (in honor of her father).
