= Nicolette Grant =

Character on HBO's Big Love

- Big Love character
- Chloë Sevigny as Nicolette Grant, Season 2.
- First appearance: "Pilot" (2006)
- Created by: Mark V. Olsen
- Portrayed by: Chloë Sevigny

In-universe information
- Alias: Margene Heffman
- Nickname: Nicki, The Braid
- Gender: Female
- Occupation: Wife, mother, Mrs. Fix-It
- Family: Roman Grant (father; deceased); Adaleen Hallstrom Grant (mother); Alby Grant (brother); Evie, Krista (sisters)
- Spouse: Bill Henrickson (husband; deceased); Barbara Henrickson (first sister-wife, with Bill); Margene Heffman (second sister-wife, with Bill), J.J. Walker (ex-husband; deceased); Ana Mesovich (ex-third sister-wife, with Bill)
- Children: Cara Lynn (b. 1995 with J.J.); Wayne and Raymond Henrickson (with Bill); Sarah, Ben and Teeny Henrickson (from Barb and Bill); Aaron, Lester and Nell Henrickson (from Bill and Margie)
- Relatives: Joey Henrickson (brother-in-law via Bill); Joey Jr. Henrickson (nephew via Joey); Maggie Henrickson (sister-in-law via Bill); Wanda Henrickson (sister-in-law via Bill, formerly sister-in-law via J.J.)
- Religion: Fundamentalist Mormon
- Nationality: American

Cara Lynn Walker
In-universe information
- Father: J.J. Walker
- Mother: Nicki Grant
- Stepfather: Bill Henrickson
- Half-brothers: Wayne Henrickson, Raymond Henrickson

Nicolette Eugenia "Nicki" Grant is a character in Big Love, an HBO television series set among contemporary polygamists in Utah. The role is played by Chloë Sevigny. The show focuses on the family of Bill Henrickson; Nicki is the second of Henrickson's three wives, and the mother of three of his children: Cara Lynn (with JJ Walker), Wayne, and Raymond.

== Characterization ==
Nicki tends to be spiteful, selfish, hypocritical, manipulative, dishonest and cold. She often apologizes by saying, “Well, that's just the way it is.” Like her mother Adaleen Hallstrom, she has a nonchalant attitude toward things like guns and fraud (i.e. fake birth certificates). When Margene asks her to ask if her mother can make her a fake driver's license, Nicki says, “It's not that easy. Do you think she just carries the equipment around with her all the time?”

Nicki retains a strong belief in "the principle" of polygamy, as well as modesty in dress and a deep suspicion of the world outside the compound.

The program has often focused on Nicki's internal conflicts of sexuality, particularly with her mixed loyalties to her father and her husband, who themselves are frequently in conflict. Nicki is often hypocritical, prone to pass blame, and incapable of taking responsibility. After accumulating $60,000 in credit card debt, she passes the buck by focusing on the faults of Bill and Barb.

== Biography ==
=== Early life ===
Nicki is the eighth daughter of Roman Grant, patriarch of the compound of polygamous Mormon fundamentalists where Bill Henrickson was also raised, and Adaleen (née Hallstrom), the sixth of Roman's fourteen wives, with whom Nicki has a tense relationship, and who both loves and resents Nicki. Nicki's father, Roman, is revered as "the Prophet" on the compound.

=== Season One ===
A season one plot line, reprised at the end of season two, showed Nicki to be a compulsive shopper who incurred nearly $60,000 in credit card debt, unbeknownst to her husband or sister wives.

Although Nicki is frequently portrayed as cold and unsympathetic, there are many instances where she is shown to be quite passionate about her beliefs and towards her loved ones. Although she has a strained relationship with her family at the Juniper Creek Compound, she is fiercely loyal to them. She has been shown going to some lengths to be a part of their lives and keep them a part of hers, much to the dismay of Bill and Barb.

Nicki is shown to be such a favorite of her father's that it upsets her husband Bill. In one example, during the 5th birthday party of her and Bill's elder son Wayne, Bill walks in on her and Roman holding hands and laughing together on her bed.

=== Season Two ===
It is revealed that Nicki has been taking birth control pills secretly for years. She is ostracized from the Grant family before her father is shot, and she steals from them to get revenge. Though it goes against their rules of morality, Nicki starts gambling at a gaming establishment to which Bill introduced her in an effort to share his new business venture with his wives. She soon begins gambling online at home as well.

Nicki is also very handy—she re-roofs her own home without assistance—and is able to nimbly move large appliances from one area of a home to another. Bill gives Nicki a power tool as an anniversary gift.

=== Season Three ===
Bill, Barb, and Margie become concerned about the fact that Nicki has not conceived and question her. Barb and Margie escort her to the fertility clinic thinking it's a medical issue; it's been 4 years since her younger son's birth and it's technically her turn to have another baby for the family. At the clinic, she gets a prescription for her next supply of birth-control pills.

On a family vacation, Barb finds Nicki's pills and assumes they are her daughter Sarah's. This forces Nicki to confess that they are hers and she's been on birth control for 4 years. Bill, Barb, and Margie are furious; Bill tells her this is the worst thing she could have ever done to him. But Nicki refuses to stop taking the pills.

When Nicki's father, Roman, is in jail awaiting his trial, she is temping at the District Attorney's office (as "Margene Heffman"). The family believes she's working there part-time to help pay off her debts, but Nicki hopes to glean inside information on her father's trial to help her family on the compound. More than that happens, though; she catches her boss's eye and also attracts the Assistant District Attorney, who's set to go up against her father. More shatteringly, the evidence reveals to her that she was in "The Joy Book". She'd always assumed that being the Prophet's daughter put her above most of the women on the compound. She is crushed to discover that her beloved father willingly put her in a book that auctioned off her virginity. She rips her pictures out of "The Joy Book" so the attorneys will not realize who she is. When she quits the job, her former boss, Ray Henry, kisses her goodbye.

Nicki goes on a date with her former boss but fails to tell him her real identity. He discovers her deception after tracking her down at the Henrickson homes in an effort to declare his romantic feelings for her.

It is revealed that Nicki was married to an older man named J.J. Walker (Wanda's brother) when she was fifteen and still living at Juniper Creek. Wanda reminds Nicki of this and how when they were girls Nicki, would tell Wanda how she "hated" J.J. and that the thought of him "made her skin crawl." Nicki and J.J. had a daughter named Cara Lynn, but when Roman finally allows her to become "unsealed," Nicki left her infant daughter behind with J.J. In the Season Three finale, Nicki brings Cara Lynn into the Henrickson household.

Also in the Season Three finale, Bill helps Nicki pack her belongings as she prepares to move with her kids into an apartment owned by Don, Bill's friend and business associate. Bill wants out of the marriage because of the danger she inflicted on it. She pleads with Barb and Margie to save her from the unsealing ceremony, but both sister-wives are on Bill's side and refuse to help her. Elsewhere, the finale shows Alby and Nicki plotting jokingly to kill Roman.

=== Season Four ===
Nicki discovers that her father died and takes time to grieve. She tries to rebuild intimacy with Bill after the family forgives her for having been on birth control. She goes undercover to prevent Bill's political opponent from winning the Republican state senate nomination. After she goes off the pills, she has trouble conceiving; later, she discovers that her mother is pregnant. She decides to visit a fertility specialist, the son of her ex-husband J.J, who is now sealed to her mother. The specialist breaks the news that she is infertile, but he assures her they will attempt to work through it so that she may conceive. This sends Nicki into an identity crisis, wondering if her sole role in life is providing Bill with children and further expanding the Henrickson family. She drastically alters her appearance breaking away from her compound fashion by wearing normal clothes. In the season finale, she cuts her hair, which was always in a compound style braid. Also in the finale, she goes against her characteristically cold demeanour when she informs her sister-wives that she wants Bill all to herself and will stand by him even if they do not.

=== Season Five ===
Due to J.J.'s demise, Cara Lynn goes to live with Nicki and the Henricksons. Bill wants to adopt Cara Lynn, but the only way to do so is if Nicki and Bill are legally married. Barb initially resists seeing that she'd have to divorce Bill, but eventually gives in with hopes that Nicki, Barb, Marge, and Bill can have a resealing ceremony. After Nicki and Bill's wedding, Bill, Nicki, and Marge go into a bedroom and seal themselves, with Barb eavesdropping outside the door.

Nicki is kidnapped by Alby and Verlan in order to execute Nicki to punish Bill. However, Verlan pleads with Alby not to kill his own sister. Nicki reminds Alby he saved her when they were younger. Alby kills Verlan and cries with Nicki.

When Nicki returns home, she discovers Cara Lynn has an inappropriate relationship with her math teacher and tries to send her to boarding school. Cara Lynn runs next door and tells everyone Nicki's plans. Cara Lynn ends up staying, but Nicki tells her that the math teacher was relieved to end the relationship and he "got what he wanted from her." Cara Lynn cries as Nicki tells her she's incapable of giving or receiving love. Nicki breaks down after Cara Lynn has a meltdown in the backyard while burning her textbooks, but Bill busts into Nicki's locked bedroom door to comfort her.
