= Margene Heffman =

Character on TV series Big Love

- Big Love character
- First appearance: "Pilot" (2006)
- Created by: Mark V. Olsen
- Portrayed by: Ginnifer Goodwin

In-universe information
- Occupation: Wife, mother, Shopping Network Salesperson
- Spouses: Bill Henrickson (husband); Barbara Henrickson (first sister-wife, with Bill); Nicolette Grant (second sister-wife, with Bill)
- Children: Sarah, Ben and Teeny Henrickson (from Barb and Bill); Wayne and Raymond Henrickson (from Nicolette and Bill); Aaron, Lester and Nell Henrickson (with Bill)
- Relatives: Virginia "Ginger" Heffman (mother, deceased); Unnamed aunt Morris (mother's uncle); Dot (Uncle Morris's wife)

Nell Henrickson
In-universe information
- Other names: Nell Heffman
- Father: Bill Henrickson
- Mother: Margene Heffman
- Brothers: Aaron Henrickson; Lester Henrickson
- Half-brothers: Ben Henrickson; Raymond Henrickson; Wayne Henrickson; Unnamed Half Brother
- Half-sisters: Sarah Henrickson; Tancy Henrickson

Margene "Margie" Heffman is a character on Big Love, the fictional HBO television series set among contemporary polygamists in Utah. The role is played by Ginnifer Goodwin. The show focuses on the family of Bill Henrickson; Margene is the third of Henrickson's three wives, and the mother of three of Henrickson's children: Aaron, Lester, and Nell.

== Biography ==
Margene is Bill Henrickson's third wife, and his youngest. She was raised by her single mother Virginia Evelyn "Ginger" Heffman in a small town in Colorado, after her father left when she was 3. Later, she and her mother moved to Salt Lake City where she attended a Catholic high school. Margene mentions an aunt who lost everything to a gambling addiction. Her mother had an uncle, Morris, who lived in rural Illinois with his wife, Dot. Morris and Dot's marriage was childless, and they had lost touch with Ginger for 25 years and were unaware of Margene's existence.

After Margene graduated from high school, she began working for Bill at the Home Plus as a customer-service representative. When Bill hired her to babysit his children, she grew close to the family, and soon Bill, Barb, and Nicki made Margene their third sister-wife. She is generally easier for Bill to deal with than his other wives; Nicki has been in trouble several times in several ways, and Barb stands up to Bill more. This changed with the season-five revelation that Margene was underage when she married Bill.

The most sexual and amorous of the three wives, Margene has given birth to three babies, but she yearns for a sense of purpose beyond being sister-wife and mother. In seasons 3-5 she discovers her entrepreneurial talent.

=== Season One ===
Margene becomes friends with their neighbor Pam, who doesn't know she's married to Bill and tries to set her up on a blind date. Margene becomes pregnant for the third time.

=== Season Two ===
Margene becomes friends with Bill's potential fourth wife Ana. Margie's mother visits without knowing that Margie is in a polygamous relationship. Bill outs Margene as his wife to his business partners.

=== Season Three ===
Margene starts a business selling jewelry on a TV shopping channel.

=== Season Four ===
Margene's jewelry business is successful, although it is threatened by Bill's plan to achieve a political position, gain the trust of the people, and then out his family as polygamists in an effort to promote acceptance of polygamy. When Ana, who is pregnant with Bill's child, threatens to leave the country to be with her boyfriend Goran, Margene volunteers to marry Goran so he can stay in the country. They follow through and the marriage is disapproved of by Margene's family, particularly Bill and Barb. She kisses Ben, which leads to his eviction from the house. However, Margene begins to develop feelings for Ana and Goran, leading her to question her marriage to Bill, Barb, and Nicki, although Bill allows Ana and Goran to leave before Margene can decide whether to explore those feelings.

=== Season Five ===
Margene reveals she was 16 when she married Bill, having concealed her true age throughout the courtship. This has the potential for legal fallout for Bill, as the age of consent in Utah is 18. At the end of the season, following Bill's death, Margene is revealed to be spending most of her time doing humanitarian work overseas, returning only for important family occasions.
