= Mark Blankenship =

American writer, critic and editor

- Born: December 9, 1978 (age 47); Chattanooga, Tennessee, U.S.
- Education: Emory University (BA); University of Oxford; Yale School of Drama (MFA)
- Occupations: Writer; critic; blogger

Mark Blankenship (born December 9, 1978) is an American writer, critic and the co-creator and editor-in-chief of the now dormant popular culture blog The Critical Condition. Since June 2021, he has been the New Works Director for the National Alliance for Musical Theatre.

== Life and career ==
Blankenship was born in Chattanooga, Tennessee. He earned a Bachelor of Arts degree from Emory University in Atlanta, Georgia, where he majored in theater studies and minored in English literature. He graduated summa cum laude in 2001, and he is a member of Phi Beta Kappa society. While at Emory, he served as the theatre, film and music critic of the student newspaper, The Emory Wheel. He also studied theater at Oxford University. Blankenship attended Yale School of Drama from 2002–2005 and holds a Master of Fine Arts in Dramaturgy and Dramatic Criticism.

As an undergraduate at Emory, he was a member—and during his sophomore year, president—of Rathskellar, the university's comedy improv troupe. Blankenship also acted in and was dramaturge for several productions at Theater Emory, an Equity theatre

He was a member of the Emory Scholars, and co-founded the Scholarship and Service Summer Program, which places students in summer internships with local non-profits.

While still a senior at Emory, he was hired as Literary Manager of Atlanta's Horizon Theatre Company, a position he held from April 2001—August 2002.

In late 2001, he was cast as the voice of Dooley, the Southern Movie Hound on the short-lived Turner South series The Southern Movie Hound.

While at Yale, Blankenship began writing for Variety, The Village Voice (where he was among the inaugural participants in the publication's University Wits series, and American Theatre. He also served as dramaturg for Yale Repertory Theatre's 2005 production of August Strindberg's Miss Julie.

Notable classmates from Yale School of Drama include Sarah Treem (staff writer for HBO's In Treatment), Rolin Jones (Pulitzer Prize-nominated playwright for The Intelligent Design of Jenny Chow, staff writer for Showtime's Weeds, Roberto Aguirre-Sacasa (staff writer for HBO's Big Love, author of several comic books for Marvel) and Maulik Pancholy (co-star of 30 Rock and Weeds)

He has lived in Park Slope, Brooklyn since 2005. His writing credits include numerous pieces for The New York Times, Variety, New York Daily News, The Village Voice, The Advocate, Time Out New York, The Huffington Post, NPR and American Theatre. He regularly appears as panelist/expert commentator for CBC News: Sunday and CNN.com.

In 2008 Blankenship founded the pop culture blog The Critical Condition with Art Meets Commerce, a New-York based new media advertising and marketing firm. The blog sought to engage readers in dialogue about various aspects of pop culture, acknowledges the impact it has on the larger culture and offers insight and analysis of the ways it is shaped by the changing zeitgeist. As an entity, it also became part of the increasingly interconnected "conversation" that exists among culture bloggers. The blog has officially been on hiatus since February 21, 2012.

Mark and Sarah D. Bunting started the Mark and Sarah Talk About Songs podcast in March 2016, a weekly pop music podcast that contains in-depth and humorous discussions of individual songs chosen by the hosts or the fans. Starting with episode 50 every tenth episode ranks every song on an album. Ranked episodes include Indigo Girls, GHV2, Sgt. Pepper's Lonely Hearts Club Band, Jagged Little Pill, and The Clueless Soundtrack.

== Awards and honors ==
One of seven judges for the 2008 Obie Awards.

Received an American Theatre/Jerome Foundation Fellowship for arts writing.
