= Primetime Emmy Award for Outstanding Guest Actor in a Drama Series =

Annual award

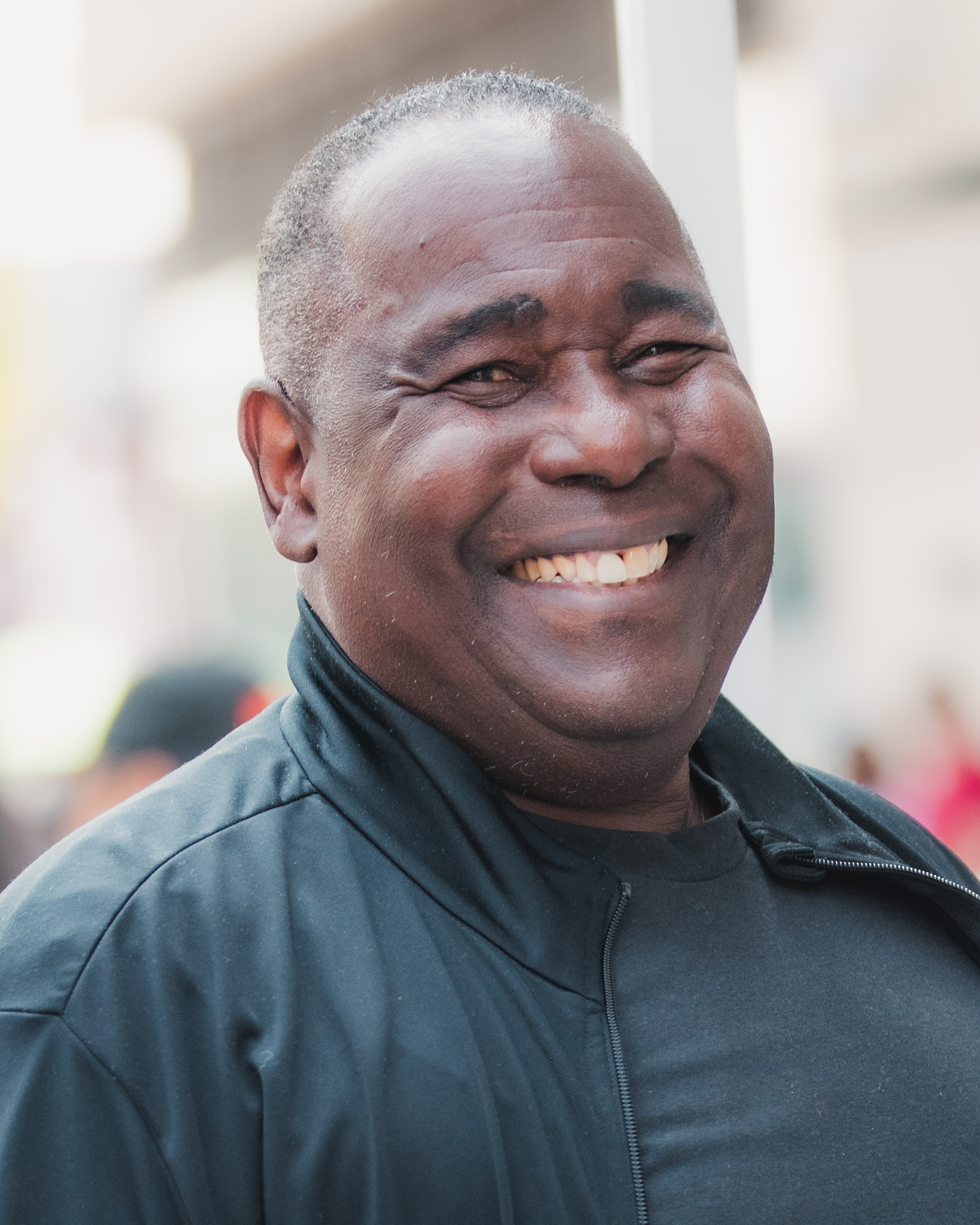
- The 2026 recipient: Ernest Harden Jr.
- Awarded for: Outstanding Performance by a Guest Actor in a Drama Series
- Country: United States
- Presented by: Academy of Television Arts & Sciences
- First award: 1975
- Currently held by: Ernest Harden Jr., The Pitt (2026)
- Website: http://www.emmys.com

The Primetime Emmy Award for Outstanding Guest Actor in a Drama Series is an award presented annually by the Academy of Television Arts & Sciences (ATAS). It is given in honor of an actor who has delivered an outstanding performance in a guest starring role on a television drama series for the primetime network season.

The award was first presented at the 27th Primetime Emmy Awards on May 19, 1975, to Patrick McGoohan for his performance on Columbo: By Dawn's Early Light. It has undergone several name changes, originally honoring leading and supporting actors in single appearances on drama and comedy series through 1978. The award was reintroduced at the 38th Primetime Emmy Awards under the name Outstanding Guest Performer in a Drama Series, honoring actors and actresses in guest starring roles on television drama series. In 1989, the category was split into separate awards for outstanding guest actor and outstanding guest actress. Beginning with the 77th Primetime Emmy Awards, performers are no longer eligible in guest acting categories if they were previously nominated for a lead or supporting award for playing the same character role in the same series.

Since its inception, the award has been given to 36 actors. Charles S. Dutton, John Lithgow, Ron Cephas Jones and Patrick McGoohan have won the most awards in this category with two each. Michael J. Fox has been nominated for the award on seven occasions, the most within the category.

== Winners and nominees ==
Listed below are the winners of the award for each year, as well as the other nominees.

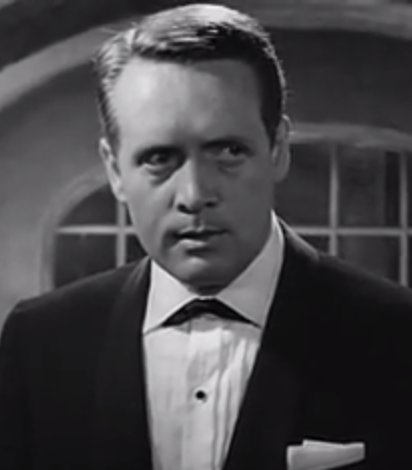
Patrick McGoohan was the first recipient of the award for his guest performance on Columbo: By Dawn's Early Light.

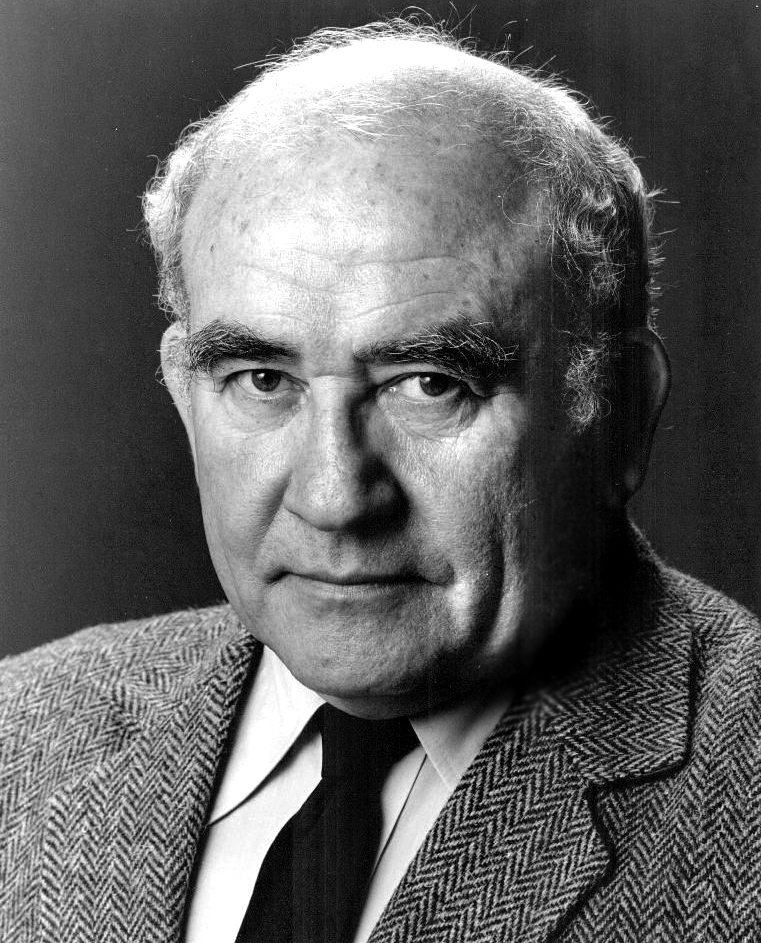
Ed Asner for Rich Man, Poor Man (1976) and Roots (1977).

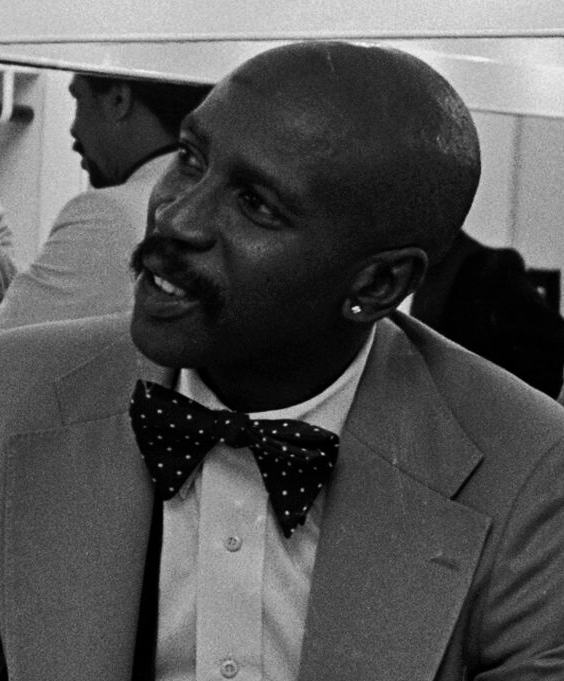
Louis Gossett Jr. won for Roots (1977).

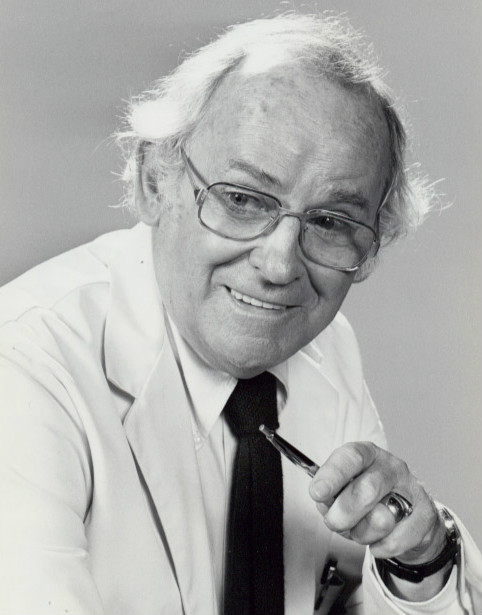
Barnard Hughes won for Lou Grant (1978).

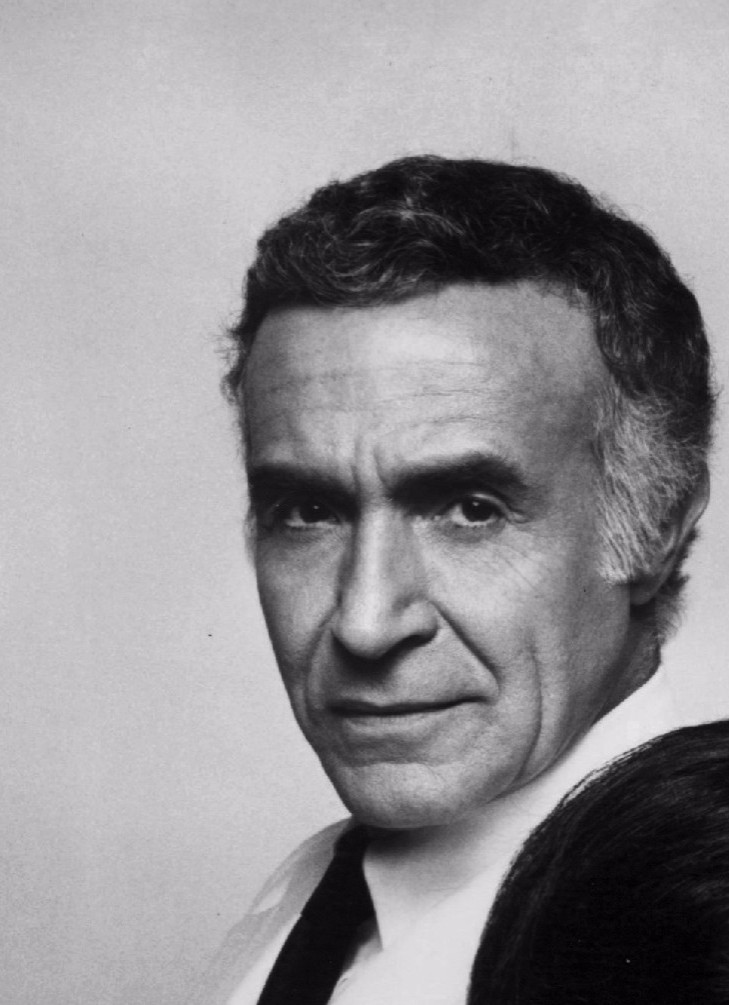
Ricardo Montalban for How the West Was Won (1978)

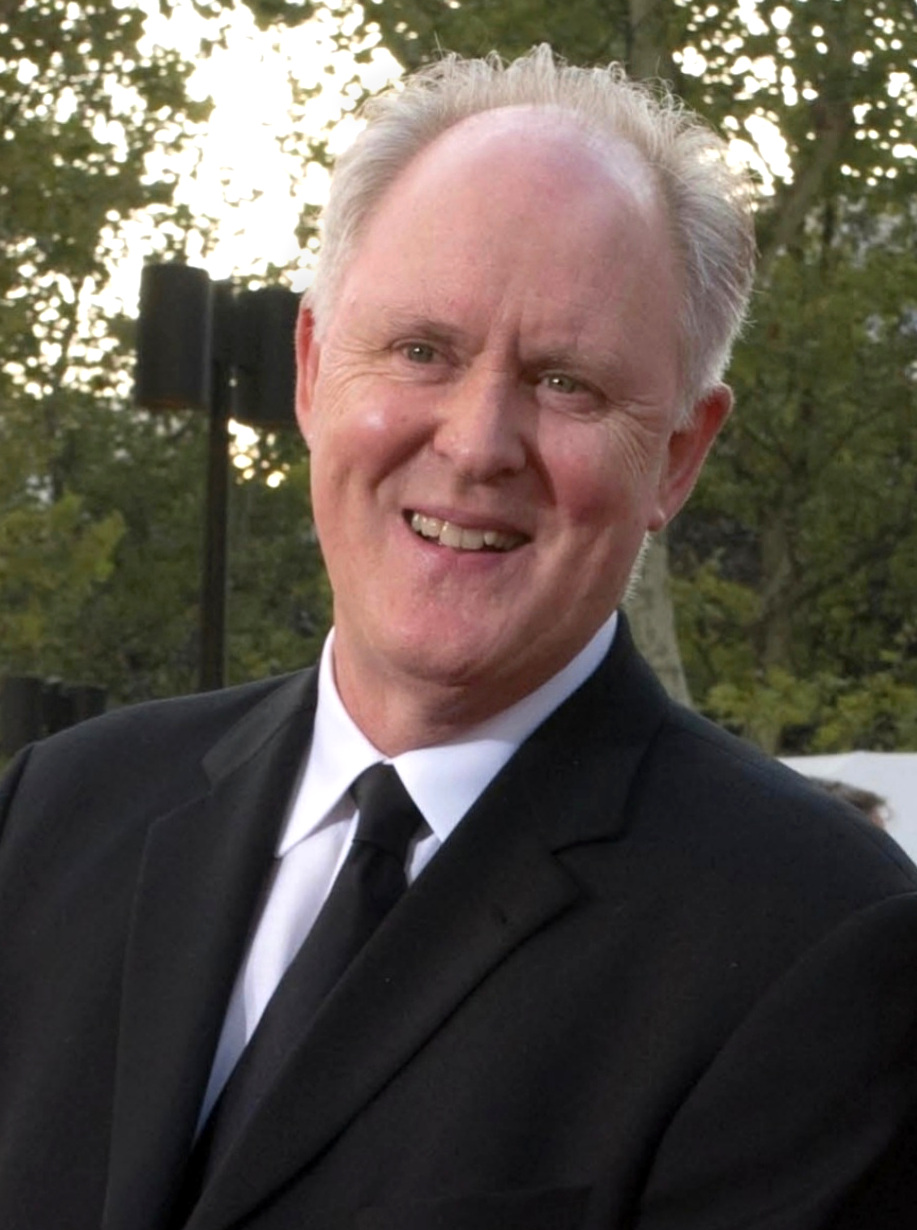
John Lithgow won twice for Amazing Stories (1986) and Dexter (2010).

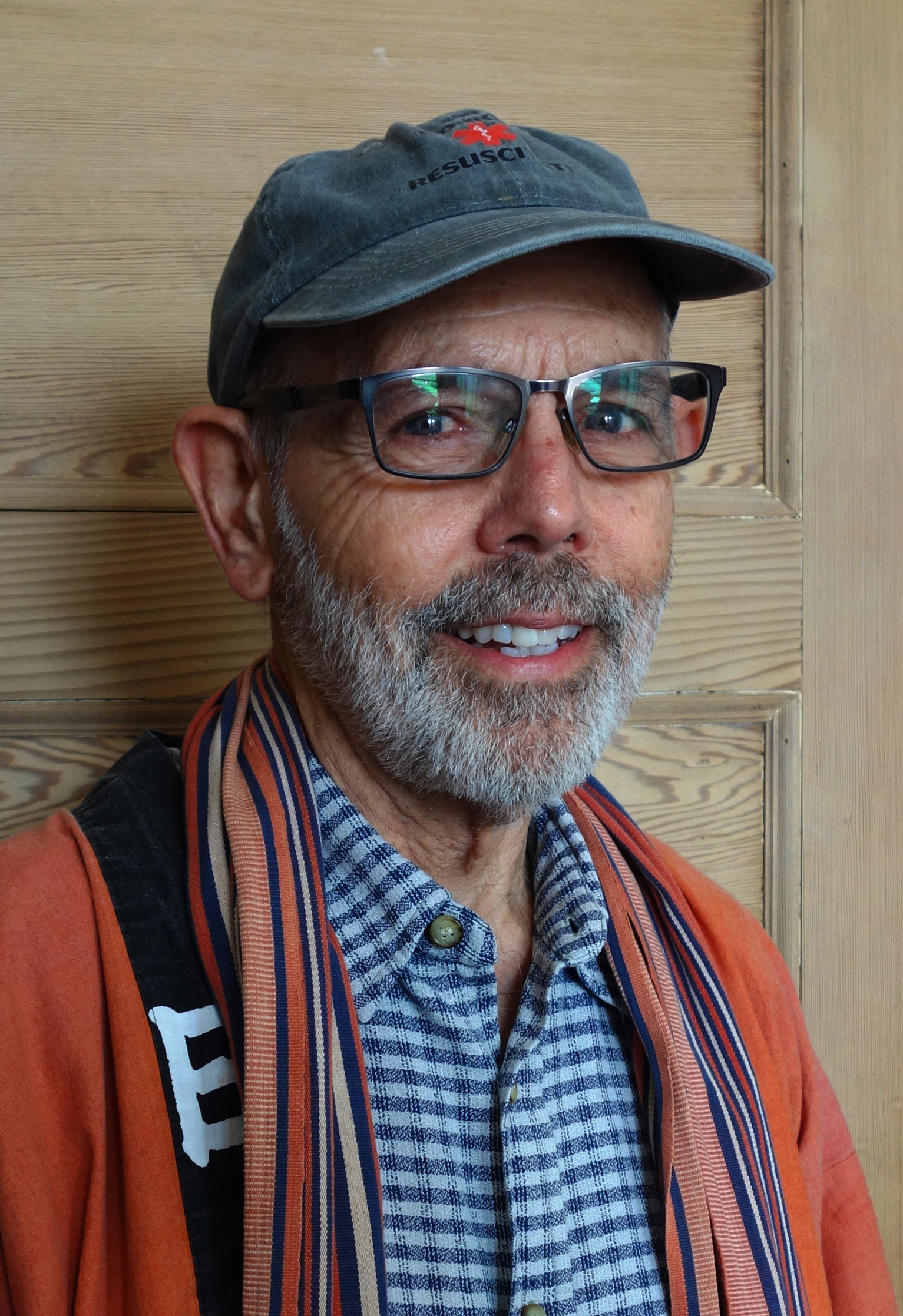
Joe Spano won for Midnight Caller (1989)

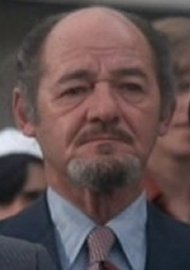
David Opatoshu won for Gabriel's Fire (1990).

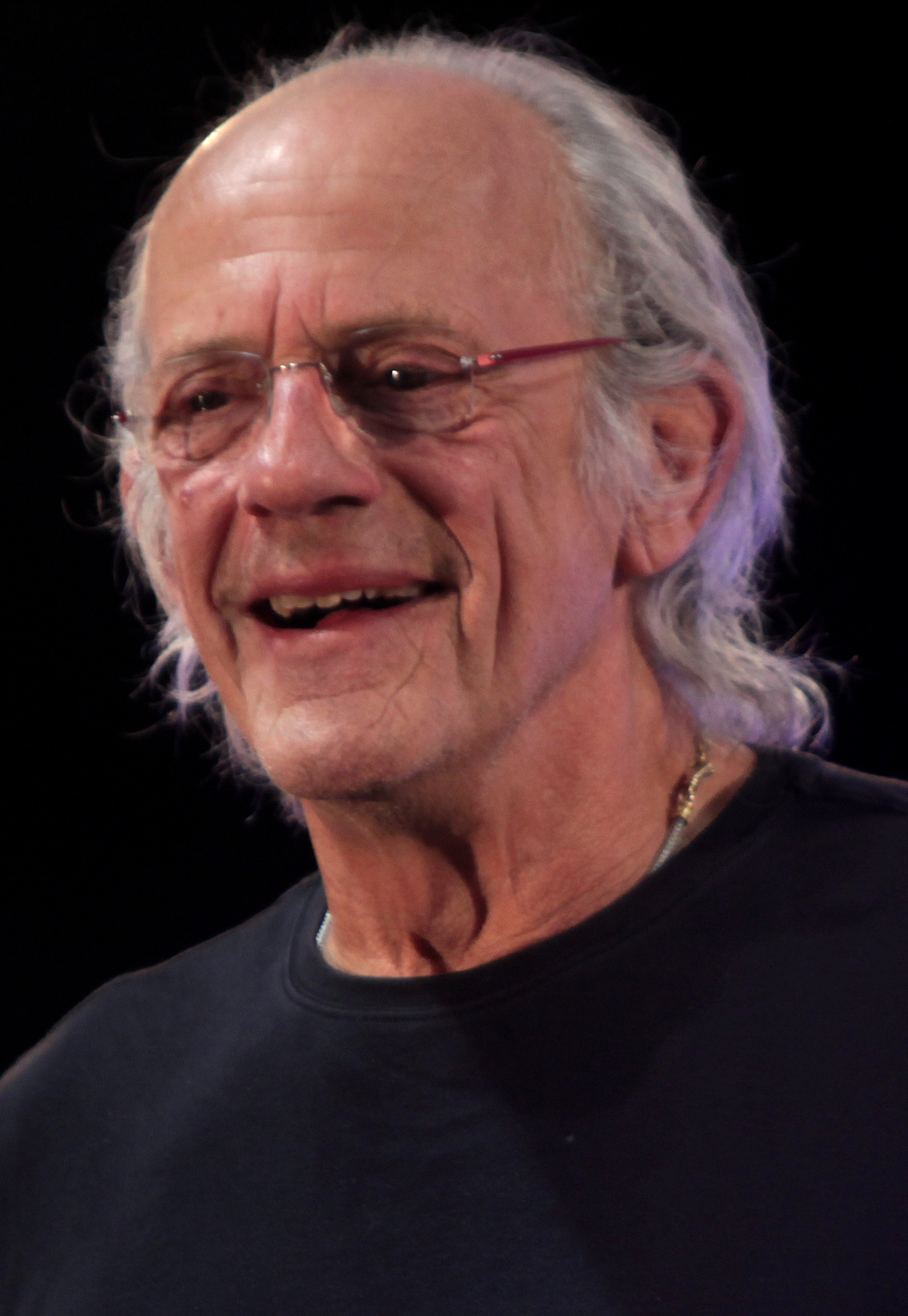
Christopher Lloyd won for Road to Avonlea (1992).

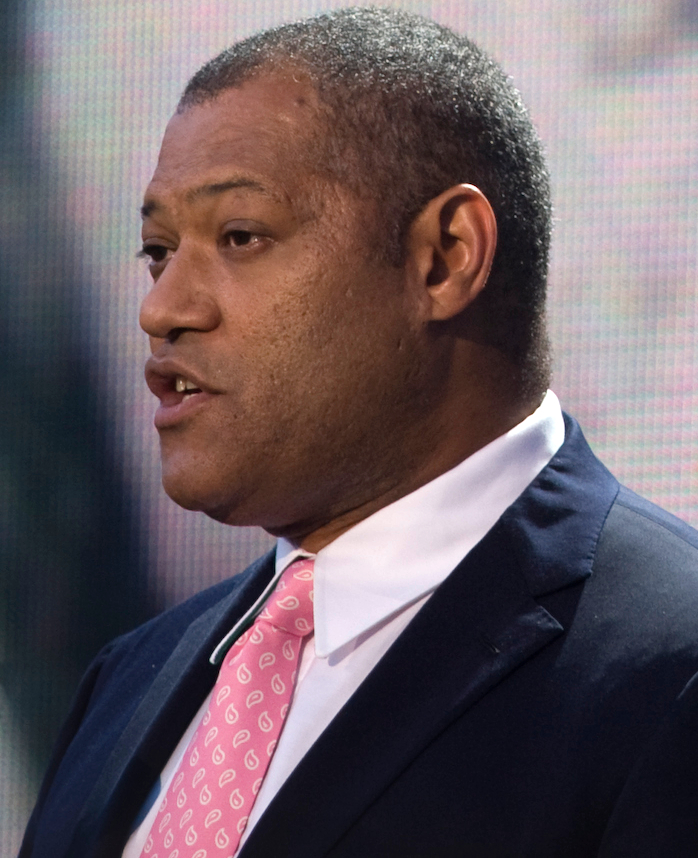
Laurence Fishburne for Tribeca (1993).

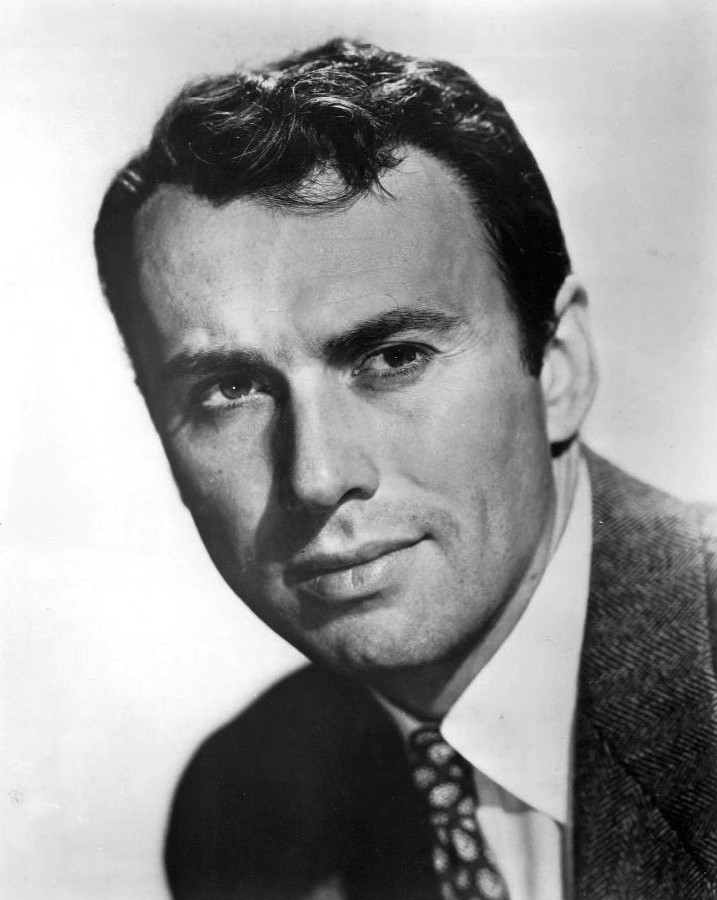
Richard Kiley won for Picket Fences (1994).

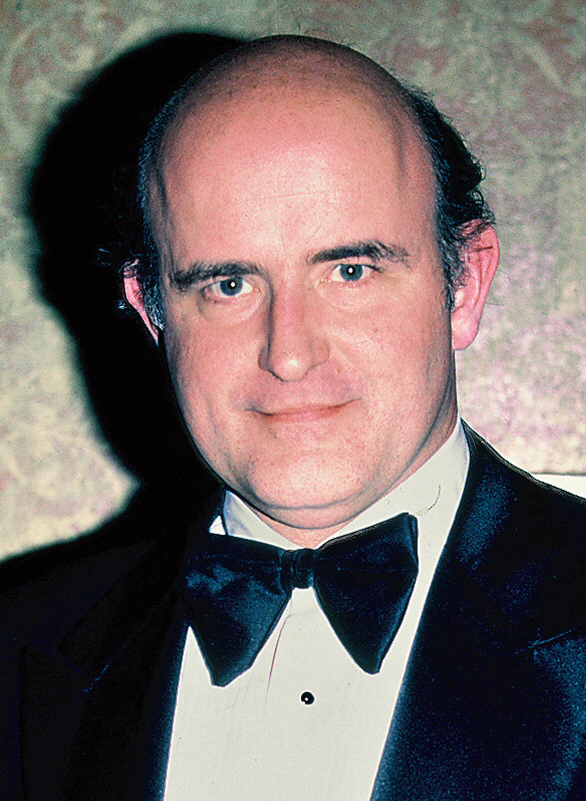
Peter Boyle won for The X-Files.

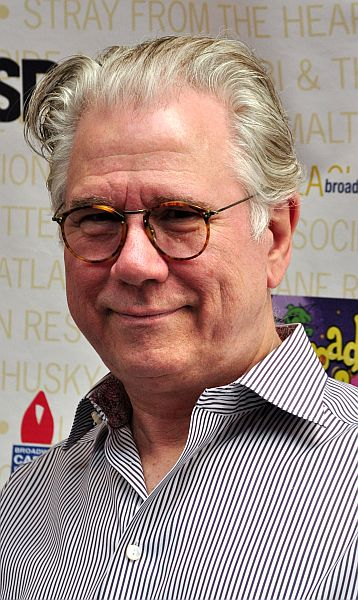
John Larroquette won for The Practice (1998).

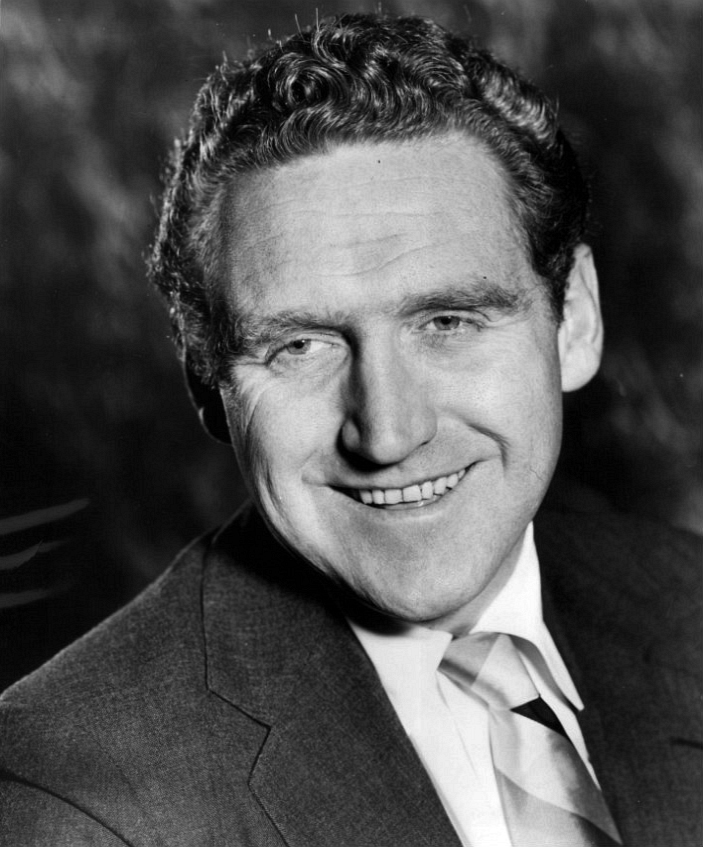
James Whitmore won for The Practice (2000).

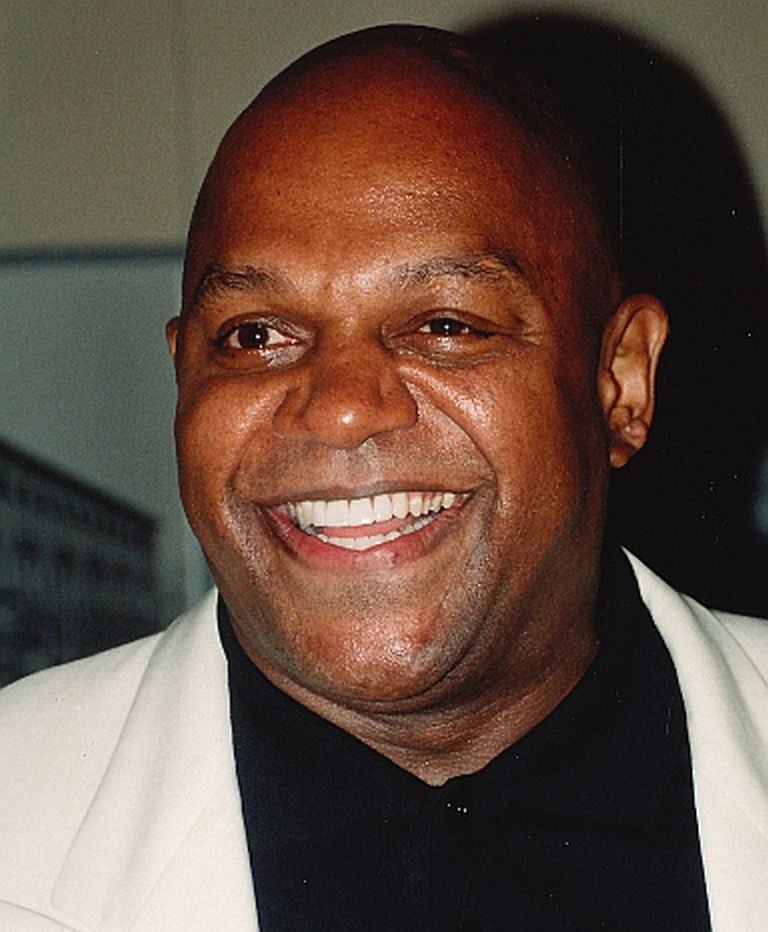
Charles S. Dutton won twice The Practice (2002) and Without a Trace (2003).

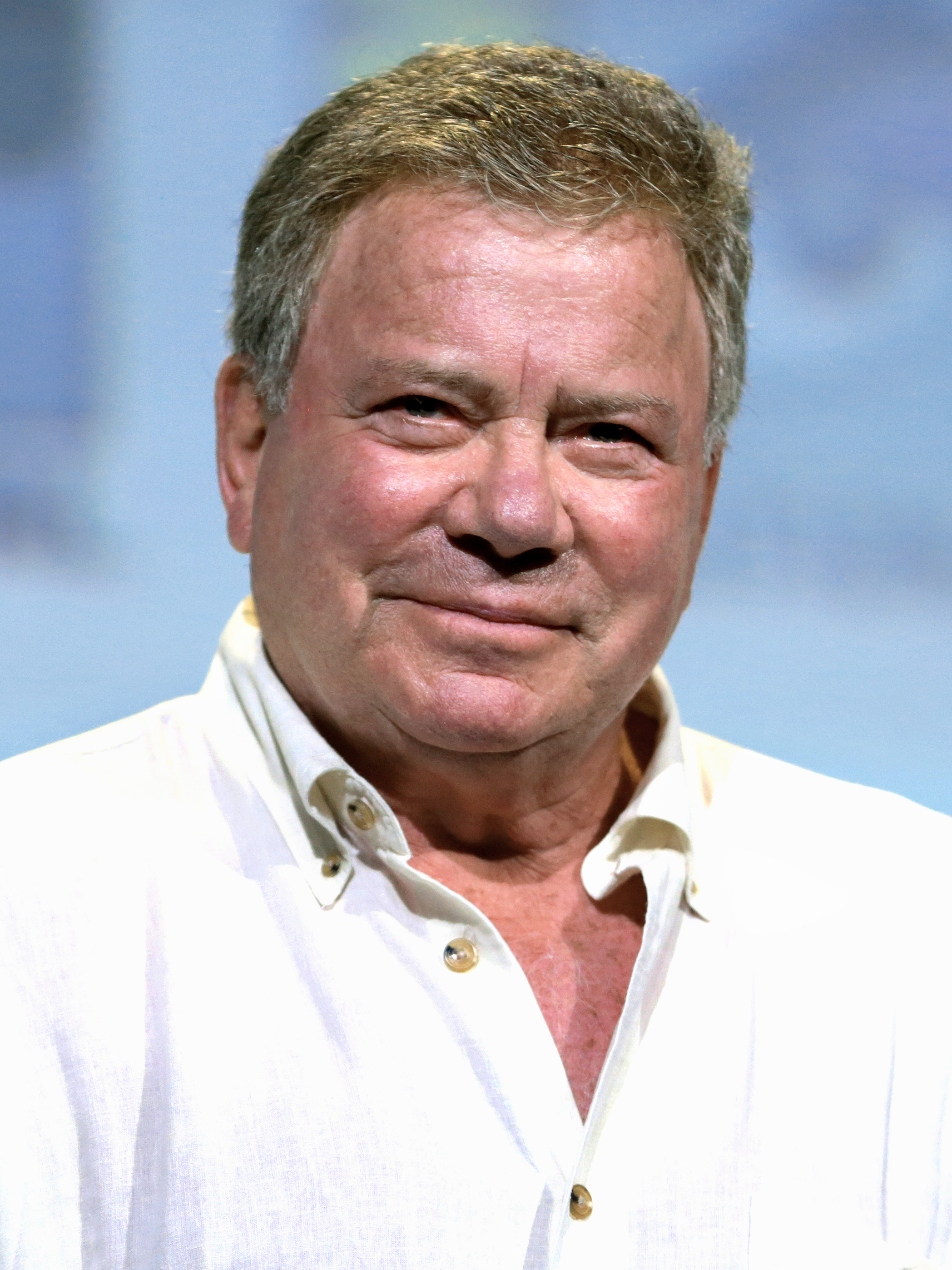
William Shatner won for The Practice (2004).

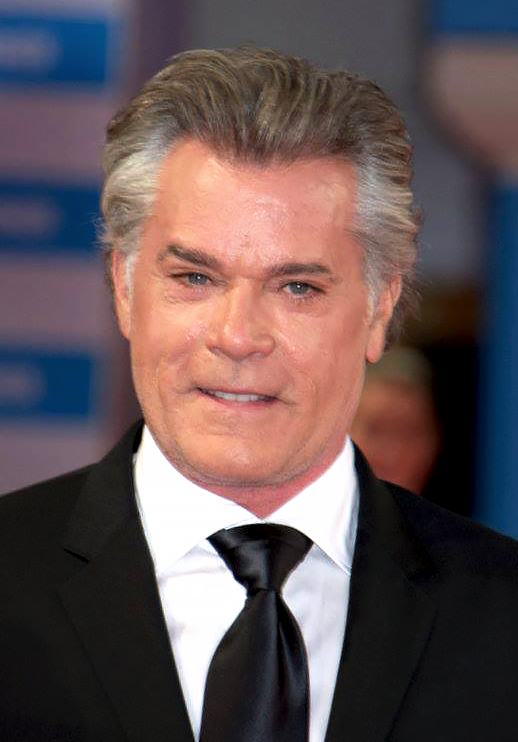
Ray Liotta won for ER (2005).

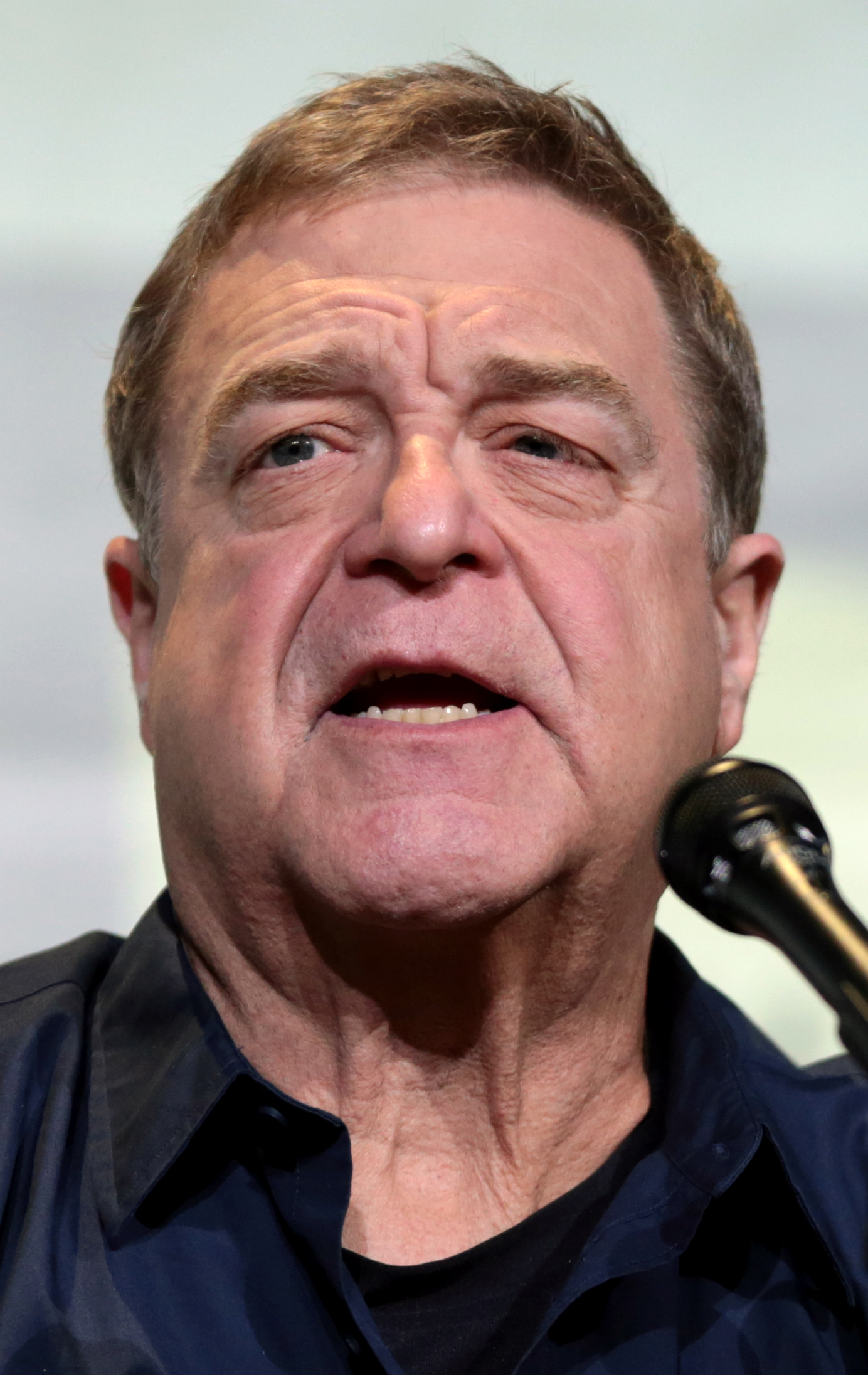
John Goodman won for Studio 60 on the Sunset Strip (2007).

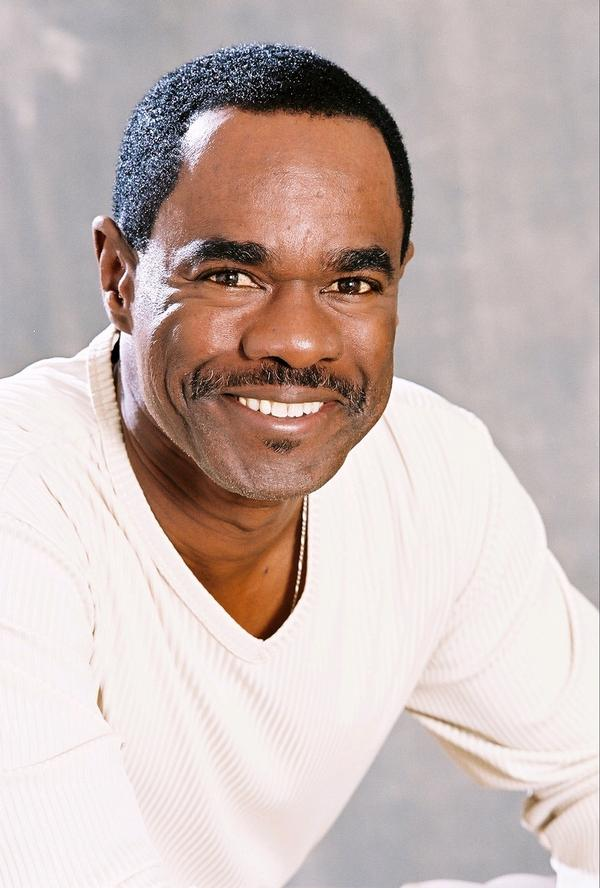
Glynn Turman won for In Treatment (2008).

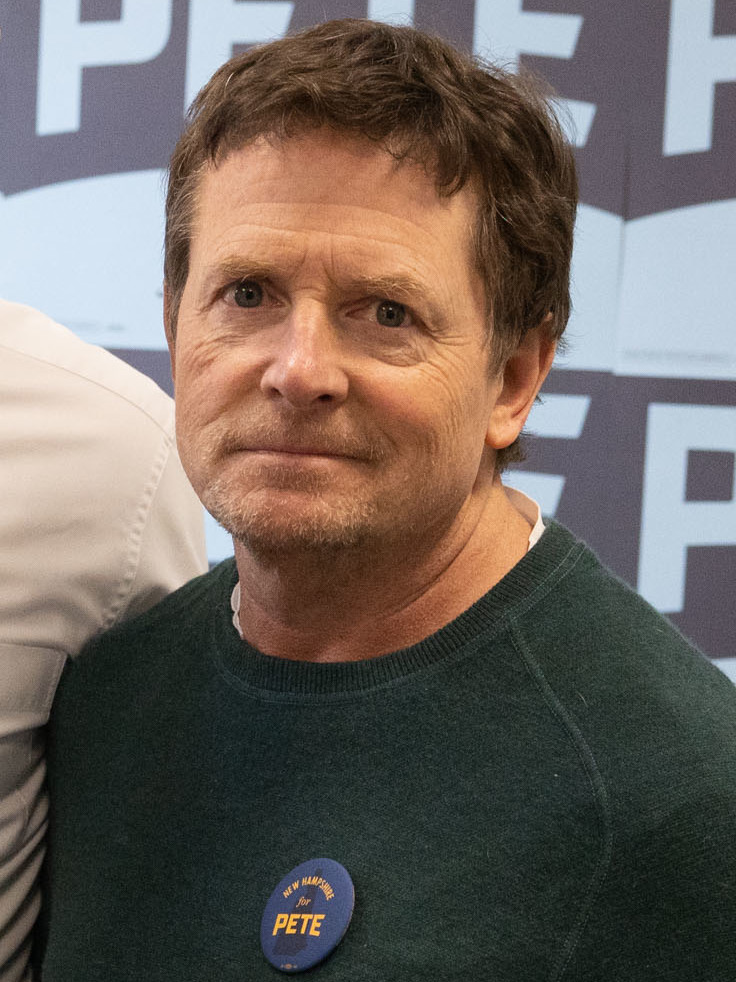
Michael J. Fox won for Rescue Me (2009).

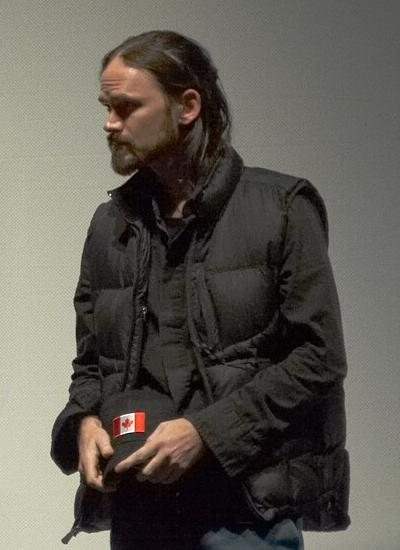
Jeremy Davies won for Justified (2011).

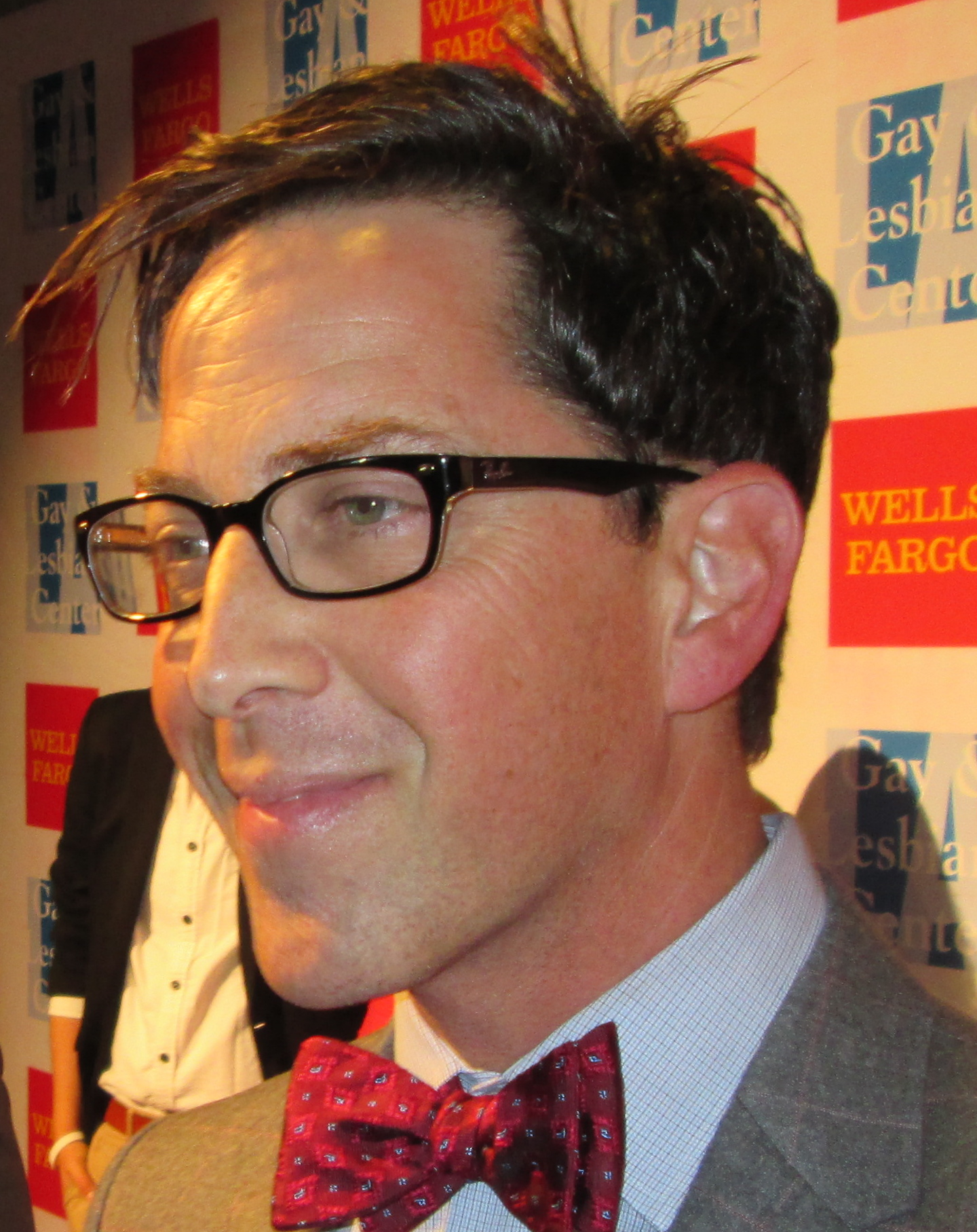
Dan Bucatinsky won for Scandal (2013)

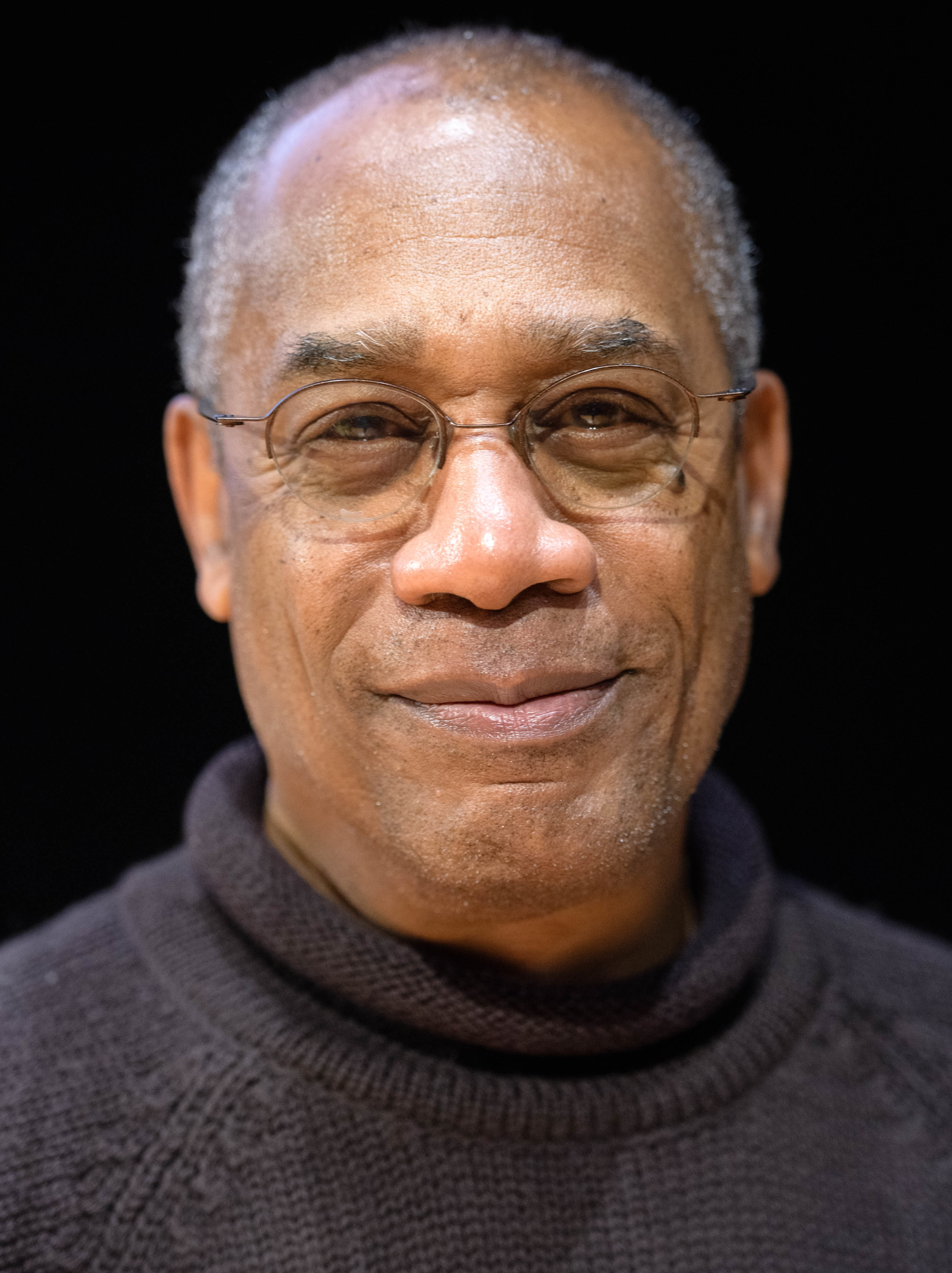
Joe Morton won for Scandal (2014).

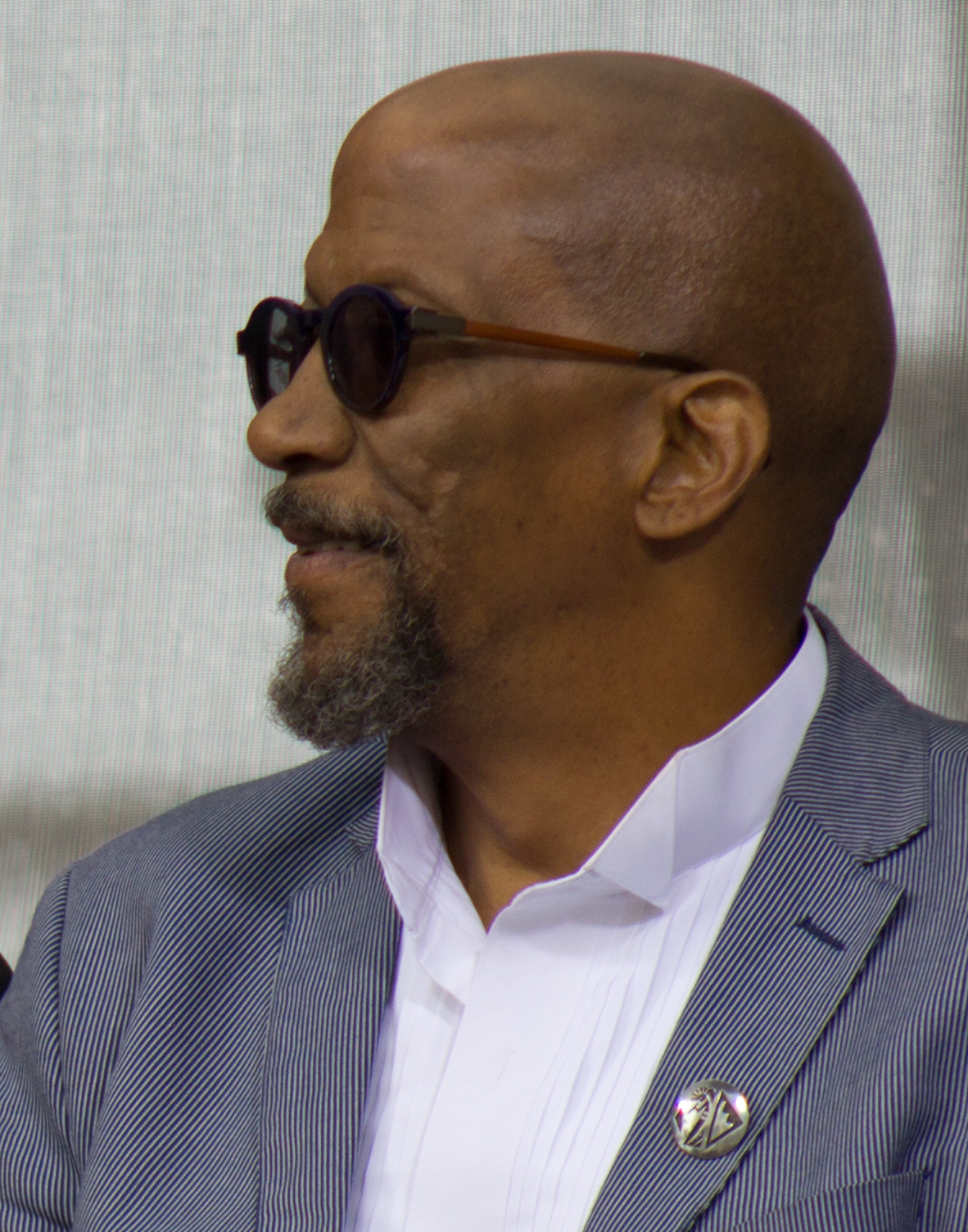
Reg E. Cathey won for House of Cards (2015).

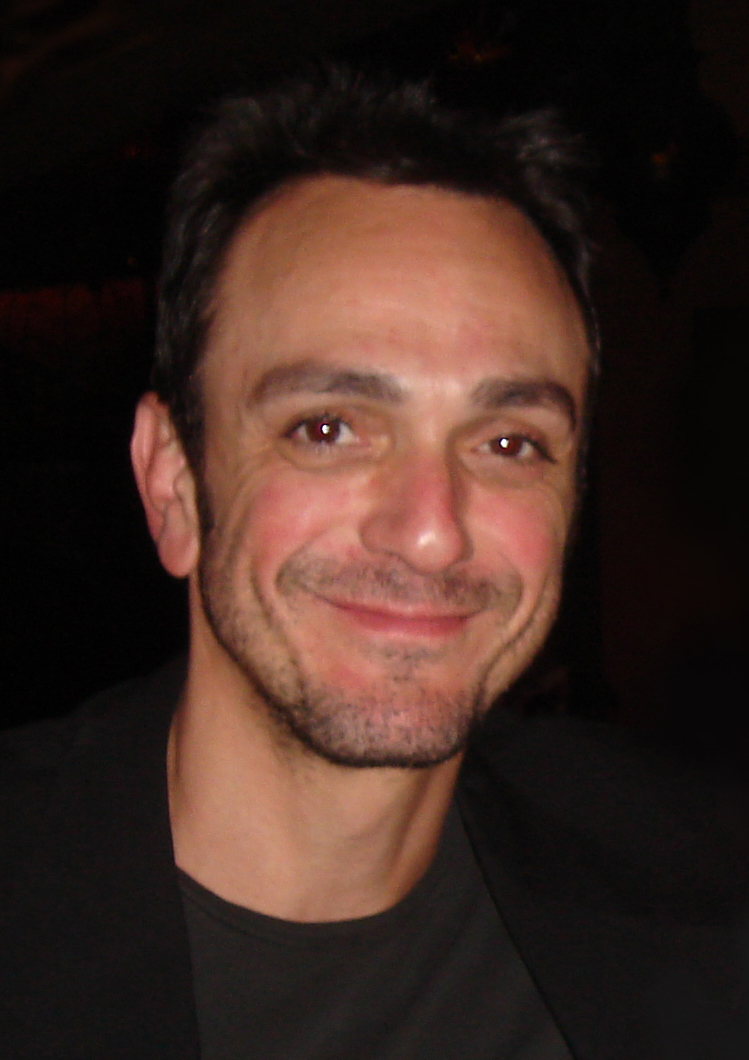
Hank Azaria won for Ray Donovan (2016).

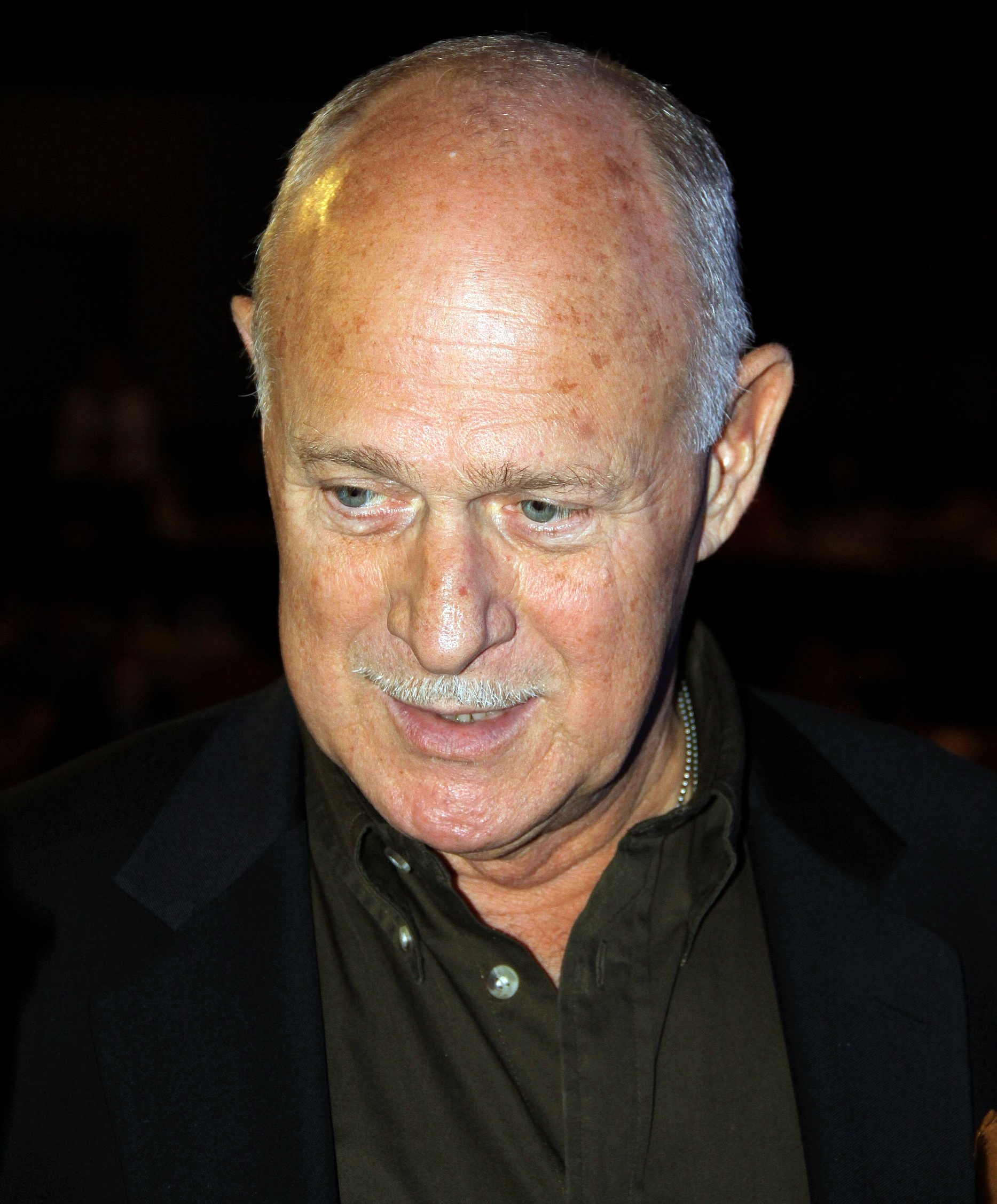
Gerald McRaney won for This is Us (2017).

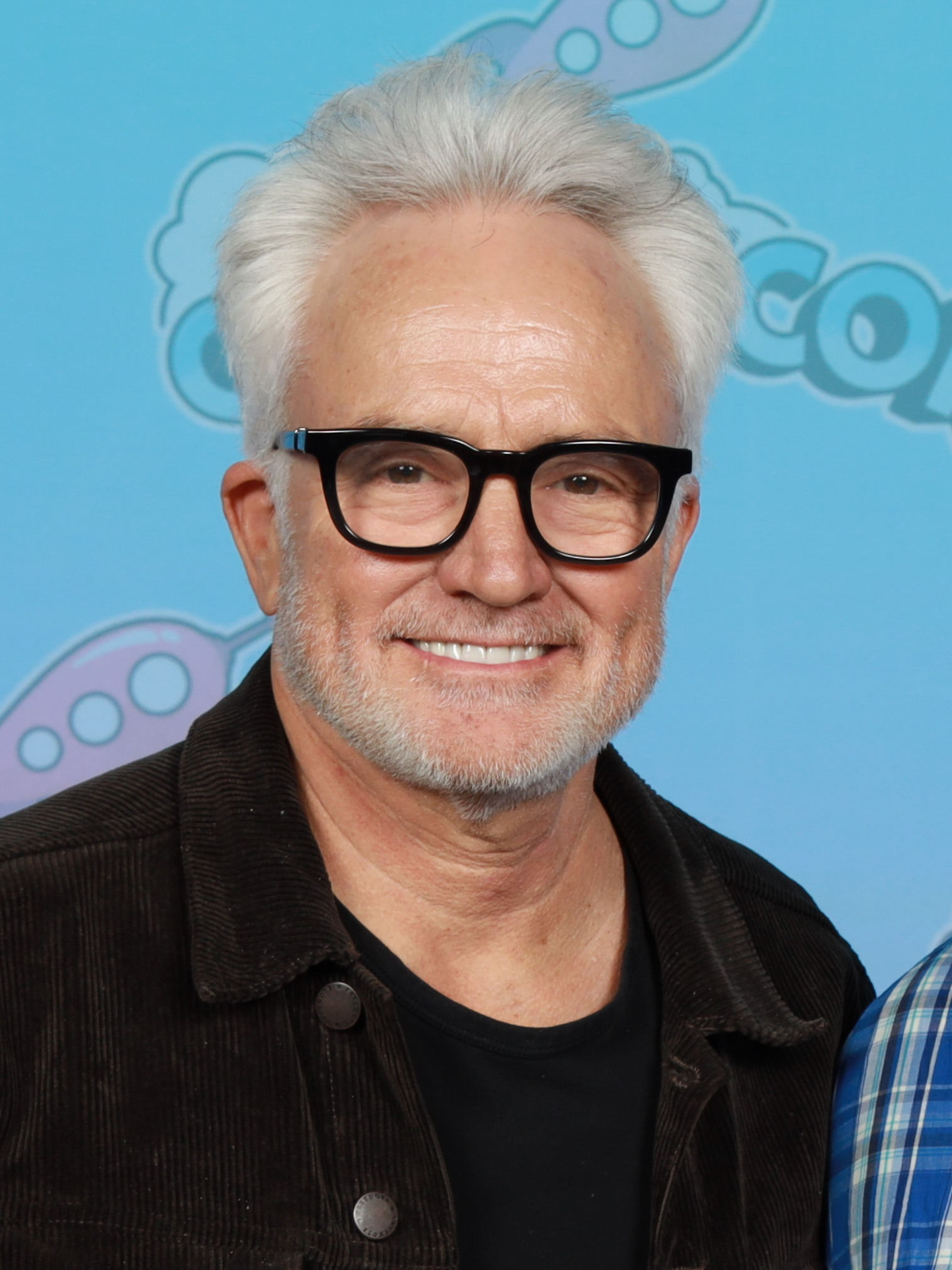
Bradley Whitford won for The Handmaid's Tale (2019).

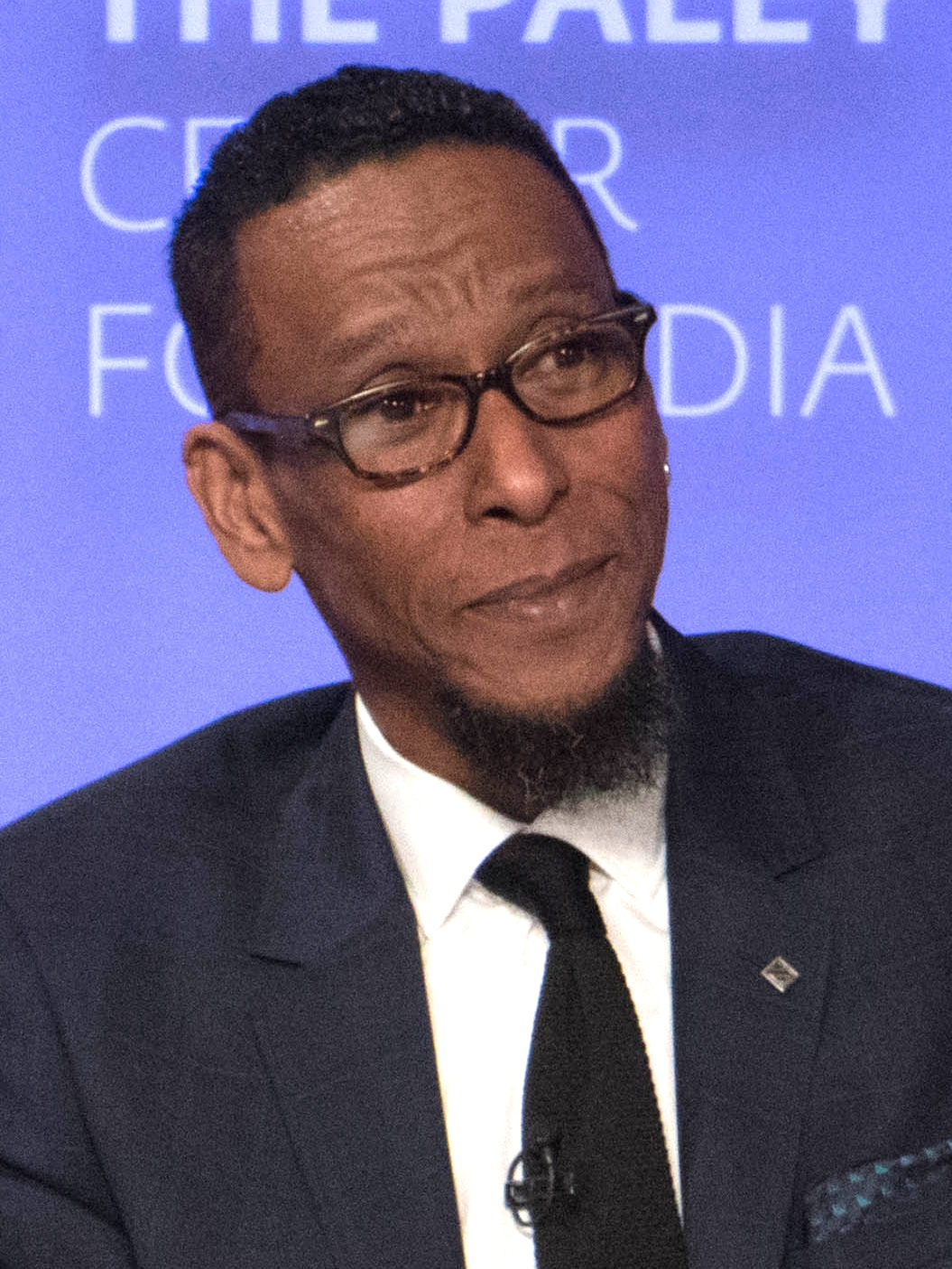
Ron Cephas Jones won twice for This is Us (2018, 2020)

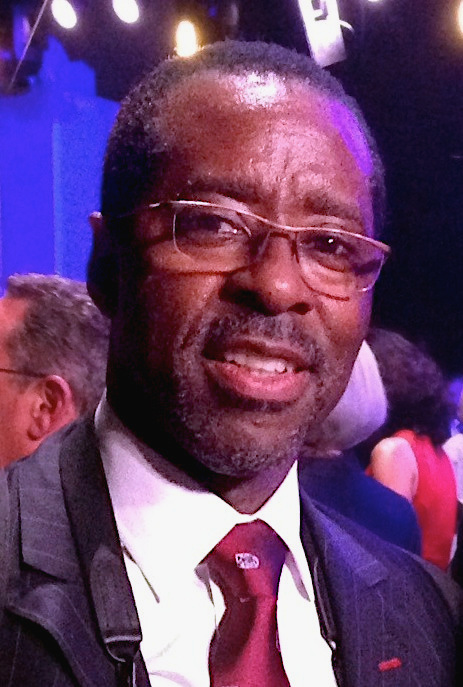
Courtney B. Vance won for Lovecraft Country (2021)

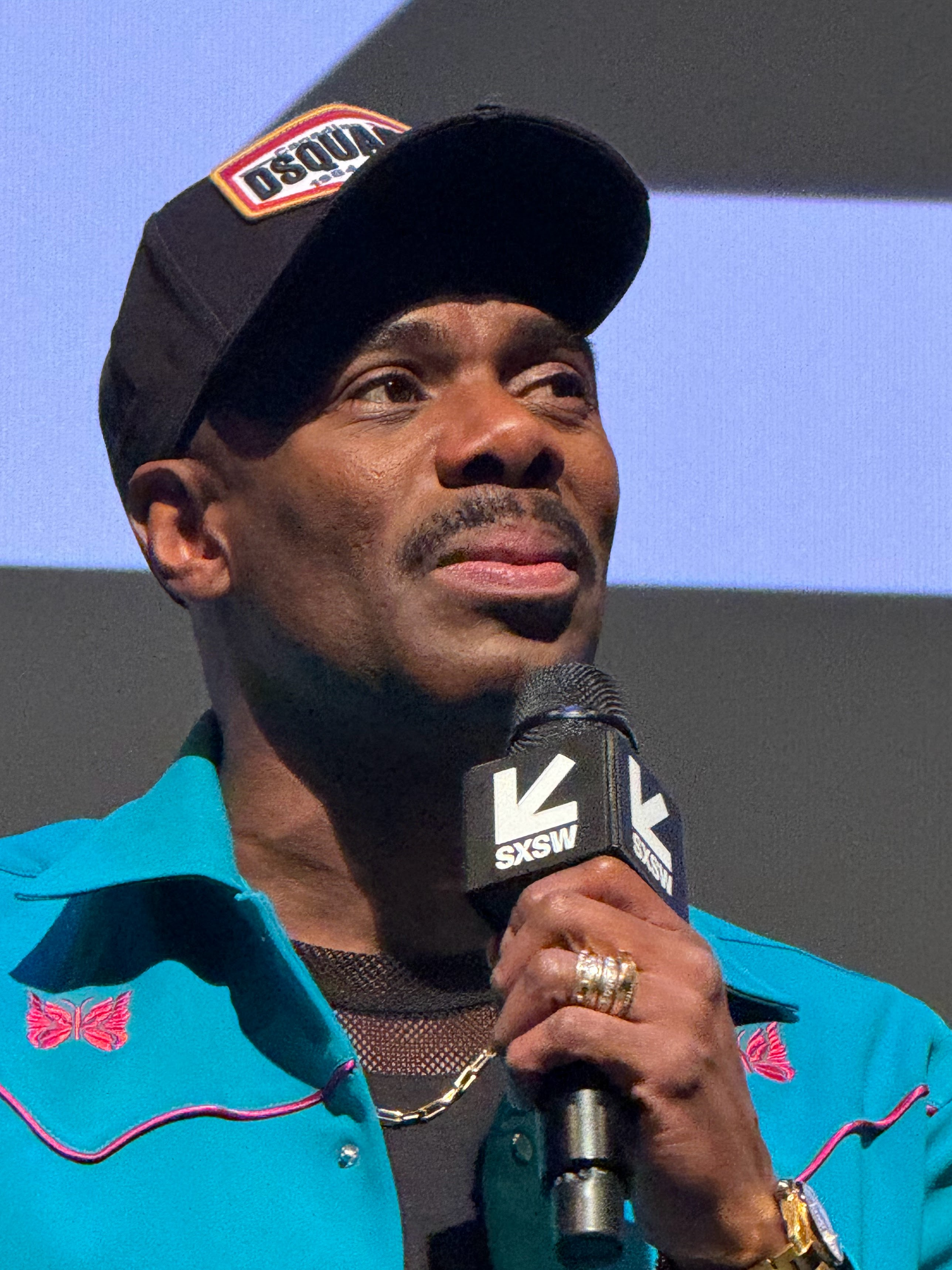
Colman Domingo won for Euphoria (2022)

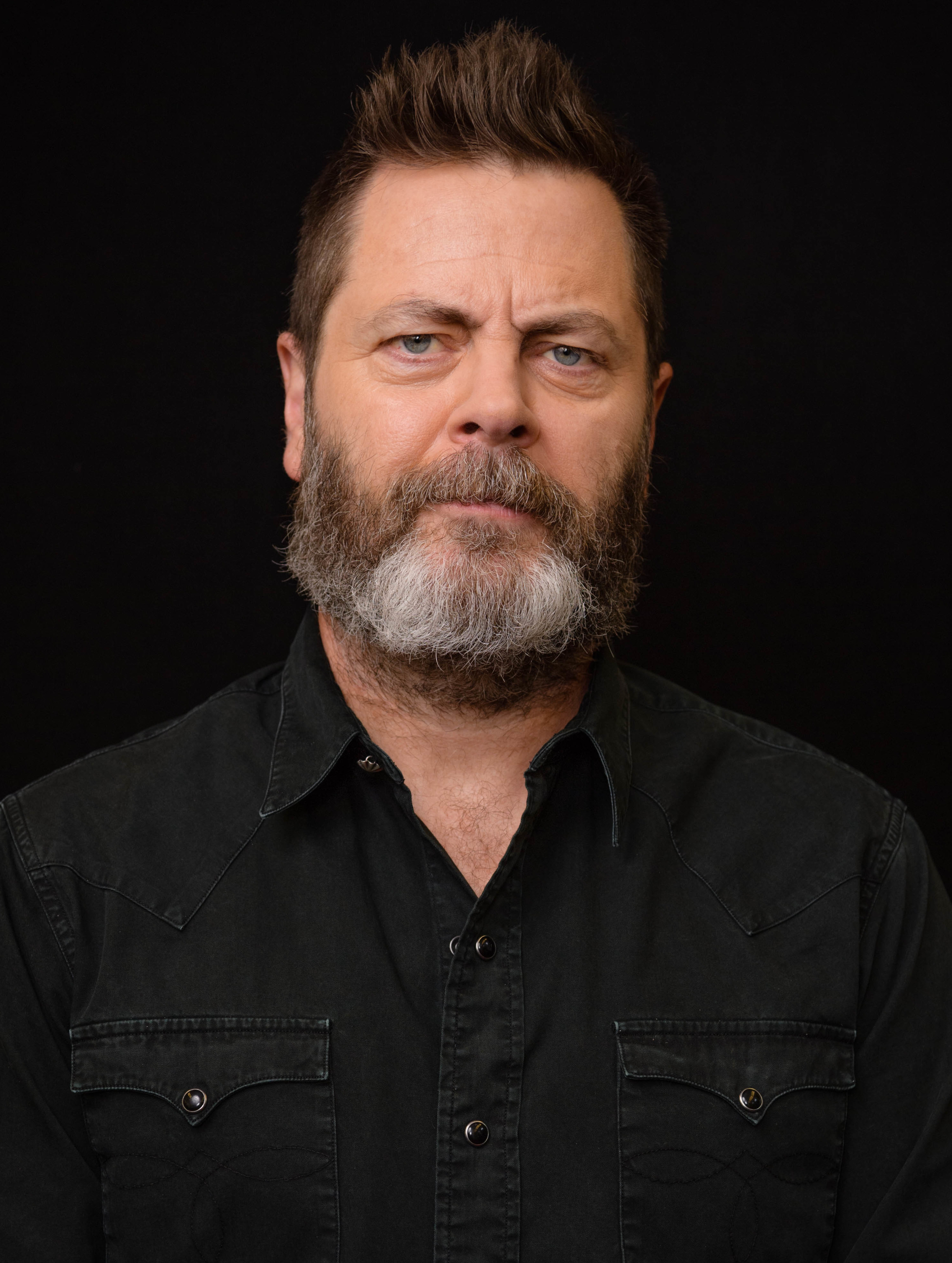
Nick Offerman won for The Last of Us (2023)

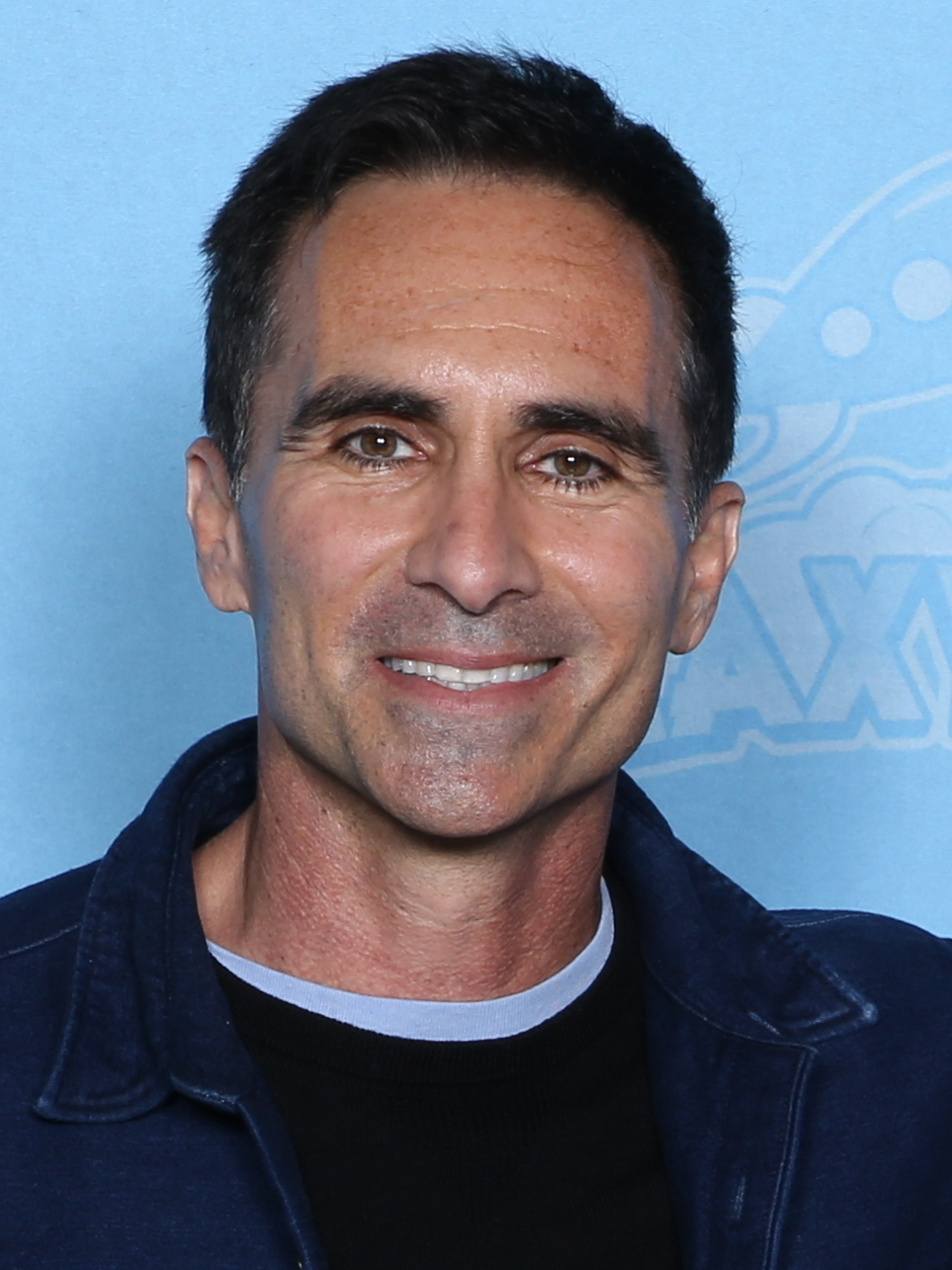
Nestor Carbonell won for Shogun (2024)

Key	Meaning
	Indicates the winning actor.

=== 1970s ===
Year	Actor	Program	Role	Submitted episode(s)	Network
1975 (27th)
1975 (27th)	Patrick McGoohan	Columbo: By Dawn's Early Light	Col. Lyle C. Rumford	"By Dawn's Early Light"	NBC
1975 (27th)	Lew Ayres	Kung Fu	Beaumont	"The Vanishing Image"	ABC
1975 (27th)	Harold Gould	Police Story	Andrea Basic	"Fathers and Sons"	NBC
1975 (27th)	Harry Morgan	M*A*S*H	Maj. Gen. Bartford Hamilton Steele	"The General Flipped at Dawn"	CBS
1976 (28th)
1976 (28th)	Outstanding Lead Actor for a Single Appearance in a Drama or Comedy Series				
1976 (28th)	Ed Asner	Rich Man, Poor Man	Axel Jordache	"Parts I"	ABC
1976 (28th)	Bill Bixby	The Streets of San Francisco	Eric Doyle	"The Police Buff"	ABC
1976 (28th)	Tony Musante	Medical Story	Dr. Paul Brandon	"The Quality of Mercy"	NBC
1976 (28th)	Robert Reed	Medical Center	Dr. Pat Caddison	"John Quincy Adams, Diplomat"	CBS
1976 (28th)	Outstanding Single Performance by a Supporting Actor in a Comedy or Drama Series				
1976 (28th)	Gordon Jackson	Upstairs, Downstairs	Hudson	"The Beastly Hun"	PBS
1976 (28th)	Bill Bixby	Rich Man, Poor Man	Willie Abbott	"Part VI"	ABC
1976 (28th)	Roscoe Lee Browne	Barney Miller	Charlie Jeffers	"The Escape Artist"	ABC
1976 (28th)	Norman Fell	Rich Man, Poor Man	Smitty	"Part V"	ABC
1976 (28th)	Van Johnson	Rich Man, Poor Man	Marsh Goodwin	"Parts VII"	ABC
1977 (29th)
1977 (29th)	Outstanding Lead Actor for a Single Appearance in a Drama or Comedy Series				
1977 (29th)	Louis Gossett Jr.	Roots	Fiddler	"Part IV"	ABC
1977 (29th)	John Amos	Roots	Toby	"Part V"	ABC
1977 (29th)	LeVar Burton	Roots	Kunta Kinte	"Part I"	ABC
1977 (29th)	Ben Vereen	Roots	"Chicken" George Moore	"Part VI"	ABC
1977 (29th)	Outstanding Single Performance by a Supporting Actor in a Comedy or Drama Series				
1977 (29th)	Ed Asner	Roots	Capt. Davies	"Part 1"	ABC
1977 (29th)	Charles Durning	Captains and the Kings	Billy Rice	"Chapter 2"	NBC
1977 (29th)	Moses Gunn	Roots	Kintango	"Part I"	ABC
1977 (29th)	Robert Reed	Roots	Dr. William Reynolds	"Part V"	ABC
1977 (29th)	Ralph Waite	Roots	Third mate Slater	"Part I"	ABC
1978 (30th)
1978 (30th)	Outstanding Lead Actor for a Single Appearance in a Drama or Comedy Series				
1978 (30th)	Barnard Hughes	Lou Grant	Judge Felix Rushman	"Judge"	CBS
1978 (30th)	David Cassidy	Police Woman	Officer Dan Shay	"A Chance to Live"	NBC
1978 (30th)	Will Geer	The Love Boat	Franklyn Bootherstone	"The Old Man and the Runaway"	ABC
1978 (30th)	Judd Hirsch	Rhoda	Mike Andretti	"Rhoda Likes Mike"	CBS
1978 (30th)	John Rubinstein	Family	Jeff Maitland	"And Baby Makes Three"	ABC
1978 (30th)	Keenan Wynn	Police Woman	Ben Fletcher	"Good Old Uncle Ben"	NBC
1978 (30th)	Outstanding Single Performance by a Supporting Actor in a Comedy or Drama Series				
1978 (30th)	Ricardo Montalbán	How the West Was Won	Satangkai	"Part I"	ABC
1978 (30th)	Will Geer	Eight is Enough	Santa Claus	"Yes, Nicholas... There is a Santa Claus"	ABC
1978 (30th)	Larry Gelman	Barney Miller	Edward Sellers	"Goodbye, Mr. Fish"	ABC
1978 (30th)	Harold Gould	Rhoda	Martin Morgenstern	"Happy Anniversary"	CBS
1978 (30th)	Abe Vigoda	Barney Miller	Det. Phil Fish	"Goodbye, Mr. Fish"	ABC

=== 1980s ===
Year	Recipient	Program	Role	Submitted episode(s)	Network
Outstanding Guest Performer in a Drama Series
1986 (38th)
1986 (38th)	John Lithgow	Amazing Stories	John Walters	"The Doll"	NBC
1986 (38th)	Whoopi Goldberg	Moonlighting	Camille	"Camille"	ABC
1986 (38th)	Edward Herrmann	St. Elsewhere	Father Joseph McCabe	"Time Heals"	NBC
1986 (38th)	Peggy McCay	Cagney & Lacey	Mrs. Carruthers	"Mothers and Sons"	CBS
1986 (38th)	James Stacy	Cagney & Lacey	Ted Peters	"The Gimp"	CBS
1987 (39th)
1987 (39th)	Alfre Woodard	L.A. Law	Adrianne Moore	"Pilot"	NBC
1987 (39th)	Steve Allen	St. Elsewhere	Lech Osoranski	"Visiting Daze"	NBC
1987 (39th)	Jeanne Cooper	L.A. Law	Gladys Becker	"Fry Me to the Moon"	NBC
1987 (39th)	Edward Herrmann	St. Elsewhere	Father Joseph McCabe	"Where There's Hope, There's Crosby"	NBC
1987 (39th)	Jayne Meadows	St. Elsewhere	Olga Osoranski	"Visiting Daze"	NBC
1988 (40th)
1988 (40th)	Shirley Knight	thirtysomething	Ruth Murdock	"The Parents Are Coming"	ABC
1988 (40th)	Imogene Coca	Moonlighting	Clara DiPesto	"Los Dos DiPietos"	ABC
1988 (40th)	Lainie Kazan	St. Elsewhere	Frieda Fiscus	"The Abby Singer Show"	NBC
1988 (40th)	Gwen Verdon	Magnum, P.I.	Catherine Peters	"Infinity And Jelly Doughnuts"	CBS
1988 (40th)	Alfre Woodard	St. Elsewhere	Dr. Roxanne Turner	"The Abby Singer Show"	NBC
Outstanding Guest Actor in a Drama Series
1989 (41st)
1989 (41st)	Joe Spano	Midnight Caller	John Saringo	"The Execution Of John Saringo"	NBC
1989 (41st)	Peter Boyle	Midnight Caller	J.J. Kilian	"Fathers and Sins"	NBC
1989 (41st)	Jack Gilford	thirtysomething	The Old Gentleman	"The Mike Van Dyke Show"	ABC
1989 (41st)	Michael Moriarty	The Equalizer	Wayne Virgil	"Starfire"	CBS
1989 (41st)	Edward Woodward	The New Alfred Hitchcock Presents	Drummond	"The Hunted"	USA

=== 1990s ===
Year	Actor	Program	Role	Submitted episode(s)	Network
1990 (42nd)
1990 (42nd)	Patrick McGoohan	Columbo	Oscar Finch	"Agenda for Murder"	ABC
1990 (42nd)	Peter Frechette	thirtysomething	Peter Montefiore	"Strangers"	ABC
1990 (42nd)	Harold Gould	The Ray Bradbury Theatre	The Old Man	"To the Chicago Abyss"	USA
1990 (42nd)	William Hickey	Tales from the Crypt	Carlton Webber	"The Switch"	HBO
1990 (42nd)	Bruce Weitz	Midnight Caller	Sgt. Ed Adderly	"Mercy Me"	NBC
1991 (43rd)
1991 (43rd)	David Opatoshu	Gabriel's Fire	Max Goldstein	"Prayers for the Goldsteins"	ABC
1991 (43rd)	Dabney Coleman	Columbo	Hugh Creighton	"Columbo and the Murder of a Rock Star"	ABC
1991 (43rd)	Peter Coyote	Road to Avonlea	Romney Penhallow	"Old Quarrels, Old Love"	Disney
1991 (43rd)	John Glover	L.A. Law	Dr. Paul Kohler	"God Rest Ye Murray Gentleman"	NBC
1992 (44th)	Christopher Lloyd (Note: Christopher Lloyd won in the category of Outstanding Lead Actor in a Drama Series for his guest appearance on Road to Avonlea.)	Road to Avonlea	Alistair Dimple	"Another Point of View"	Disney Channel
1992 (44th)	Kirk Douglas (Note: Kirk Douglas was nominated in the category of Outstanding Lead Actor in a Drama Series for his guest appearance on Tales from the Crypt.)	Tales from the Crypt	General Calthrob	"Yellow"	HBO
1992 (44th)	Richard Kiley (Note: Richard Kiley was nominated in the category of Outstanding Supporting Actor in a Drama Series for his guest appearance on The Ray Bradbury Theater, but lost to Richard Dysart, who won for his role on L.A. Law.)	The Ray Bradbury Theater	Doug Spaulding	"The Utterly Perfect Murder"	USA
1992 (44th)	Harrison Page (Note: Harrison Page was nominated in the category of Outstanding Lead Actor in a Drama Series for his guest appearance on Quantum Leap.)	Quantum Leap	Reverend Walters	"A Song for the Soul - April 7, 1963"	NBC
1992 (44th)	Jimmy Smits (Note: Jimmy Smits was nominated in the category of Outstanding Supporting Actor in a Drama Series for his guest appearance on L.A. Law, but lost to his co-star, Richard Dysart.)	L.A. Law	Victor Sifuentes	"Steal It Again, Sam"	NBC
1993 (45th)
1993 (45th)	Laurence Fishburne	TriBeCa	Martin McHenry	"The Box"	Fox
1993 (45th)	Adam Arkin	Northern Exposure	Adam	"The Big Feast"	CBS
1993 (45th)	John Glover	Crime & Punishment	Dennis Atwood	"Best Laid Plans"	NBC
1993 (45th)	Michael Jeter	Picket Fences	Peter Lebeck	"Frog Man"	CBS
1993 (45th)	Richard Kiley	Picket Fences	Hayden Langston	"Thanksgiving"	CBS
1994 (46th)
1994 (46th)	Richard Kiley	Picket Fences	Hayden Langston	"Buried Alive"	CBS
1994 (46th)	Tim Curry	Tales from the Crypt	Ma Brackett/Pa Brackett/Winona	"Death of Some Salesman"	HBO
1994 (46th)	Dan Hedaya	NYPD Blue	Lou the Werewolf	"NYPD Lou"	ABC
1994 (46th)	James Earl Jones	Picket Fences	Attorney Bryant Thomas	"System Down"	CBS
1994 (46th)	Robin Williams	Homicide: Life on the Street	Robert Ellison	"Bop Gun"	NBC
1995 (47th)
1995 (47th)	Paul Winfield	Picket Fences	Judge Harold Nance	"Enemy Lines"	CBS
1995 (47th)	Milton Berle	Beverly Hills, 90210	Saul Howard	"Sentenced to Life"	Fox
1995 (47th)	Beau Bridges	The Outer Limits	Simon Kress	"Sandkings"	Showtime
1995 (47th)	Vondie Curtis-Hall	ER	Rena	"ER Confidential"	NBC
1995 (47th)	Alan Rosenberg	ER	Sam Gasner	"Into That Good Night"	NBC
1996 (48th)
1996 (48th)	Peter Boyle	The X-Files	Clyde Bruckman	"Clyde Bruckman's Final Repose"	Fox
1996 (48th)	Danny Glover	Fallen Angels	Philip Marlowe	"Red Wind"	Showtime
1996 (48th)	Michael Jeter	Chicago Hope	Bob Ryan	"A Coupla Stiffs"	CBS
1996 (48th)	Richard Pryor	Chicago Hope	Joe Springer	"Stand"	CBS
1996 (48th)	Rip Torn	Chicago Hope	Warren Schutt	"Hello Goodbye"	CBS
1997 (49th)
1997 (49th)	Pruitt Taylor Vince	Murder One	Clifford Banks	"Diary of a Serial Killer"	ABC
1997 (49th)	Alan Arkin	Chicago Hope	Zoltan Karpathein	"The Son Also Rises"	CBS
1997 (49th)	Louis Gossett Jr.	Touched by an Angel	Anderson Walker	"Amazing Grace"	CBS
1997 (49th)	William H. Macy	ER	Dr. Morgenstern	—N/a	NBC
1997 (49th)	Ewan McGregor	ER	Duncan Stewart	"The Long Way Around"	NBC
1998 (50th)
1998 (50th)	John Larroquette	The Practice	Joey Heric	"Betrayal"	ABC
1998 (50th)	Bruce Davison	Touched by an Angel	Jake	"Elijah"	CBS
1998 (50th)	Vincent D'Onofrio	Homicide: Life on the Street	John Lange	"Subway"	NBC
1998 (50th)	Charles Durning	Homicide: Life on the Street	Thomas Finnegan	"Finnegan's Wake"	NBC
1998 (50th)	Charles Nelson Reilly	Millennium	Jose Chung	"Jose Chung's Doomsday Defense"	Fox
1999 (51st)
1999 (51st)	Edward Herrmann	The Practice	Atty. Anderson Pearson	—N/a	ABC
1999 (51st)	Tony Danza	The Practice	Tommy Silva	—N/a	ABC
1999 (51st)	Charles S. Dutton	Oz	Alvah Case	"The Tip"	HBO
1999 (51st)	John Heard	The Sopranos	Det. Vin Makazian	"Nobody Knows Anything"	HBO
1999 (51st)	Mandy Patinkin	Chicago Hope	Dr. Jeffery Geiger	"Curing Cancer"	CBS

=== 2000s ===
Year	Actor	Program	Role	Network
2000 (52nd)
2000 (52nd)	James Whitmore	The Practice	Raymond Oz	ABC
2000 (52nd)	Alan Alda	ER	Dr. Gabriel Lawrence	NBC
2000 (52nd)	Paul Dooley	The Practice	Judge Philip Swackhein	ABC
2000 (52nd)	Kirk Douglas	Touched by an Angel	Ross Burger	CBS
2000 (52nd)	Henry Winkler	The Practice	Henry Olson	ABC
2001 (53rd)
2001 (53rd)	Michael Emerson	The Practice	William Hinks	ABC
2001 (53rd)	René Auberjonois	The Practice	Judge Mantz	ABC
2001 (53rd)	James Cromwell	ER	Bishop Lionel Stewart	NBC
2001 (53rd)	Patrick Dempsey	Once and Again	Aaron Brooks	ABC
2001 (53rd)	Oliver Platt	The West Wing	Oliver Babish	NBC
2002 (54th)
2002 (54th)	Charles S. Dutton	The Practice	Leonard Marshall	ABC
2002 (54th)	Mark Harmon	The West Wing	Agent Simon Donovan	NBC
2002 (54th)	John Larroquette	The Practice	Joey Heric	ABC
2002 (54th)	Tim Matheson	The West Wing	Vice President John Hoynes	NBC
2002 (54th)	Ron Silver	The West Wing	Bruno Giannelli	NBC
2003 (55th)
2003 (55th)	Charles S. Dutton	Without a Trace	Chet Collins	CBS
2003 (55th)	Don Cheadle	ER	Paul Nathan	NBC
2003 (55th)	James Cromwell	Six Feet Under	George Sibley	HBO
2003 (55th)	Tim Matheson	The West Wing	Vice President John Hoynes	NBC
2003 (55th)	Matthew Perry	The West Wing	Joe Quincy	NBC
2003 (55th)	James Whitmore	Mister Sterling	Bill Sterling Sr.	NBC
2004 (56th)
2004 (56th)	William Shatner	The Practice	Denny Crane	ABC
2004 (56th)	James Earl Jones	Everwood	Will Cleveland	The WB
2004 (56th)	Martin Landau	Without a Trace	Frank Malone	CBS
2004 (56th)	Bob Newhart	ER	Ben Hollander	NBC
2004 (56th)	Matthew Perry	The West Wing	Joe Quincy	NBC
2005 (57th)
2005 (57th)	Ray Liotta	ER	Charlie Metcalf	NBC
2005 (57th)	Red Buttons	ER	Jules 'Ruby' Rubadoux	NBC
2005 (57th)	Ossie Davis	The L Word	Melvin Porter	Showtime
2005 (57th)	Charles Durning	NCIS	Ernie Yost	CBS
2005 (57th)	Martin Landau	Without a Trace	Frank Malone	CBS
2006 (58th)
2006 (58th)	Christian Clemenson	Boston Legal	Jerry Espenson	ABC
2006 (58th)	Kyle Chandler	Grey's Anatomy	Dylan Young	ABC
2006 (58th)	Henry Ian Cusick	Lost	Desmond Hume	ABC
2006 (58th)	Michael J. Fox	Boston Legal	Daniel Post	ABC
2006 (58th)	James Woods	ER	Dr. Nate Lennox	NBC
2007 (59th)
2007 (59th)	John Goodman	Studio 60 on the Sunset Strip	Judge Robert Bebe	NBC
2007 (59th)	Christian Clemenson	Boston Legal	Jerry Espenson	ABC
2007 (59th)	Tim Daly	The Sopranos	J.T. Dolan	HBO
2007 (59th)	David Morse	House	Michael Tritter	Fox
2007 (59th)	Eli Wallach	Studio 60 on the Sunset Strip	Eli Weintraub	NBC
2007 (59th)	Forest Whitaker	ER	Curtis Ames	NBC
2008 (60th)
2008 (60th)	Glynn Turman	In Treatment	Alex Prince Jr.	HBO
2008 (60th)	Charles Durning	Rescue Me	John Gavin Sr.	FX
2008 (60th)	Robert Morse	Mad Men	Bert Cooper	AMC
2008 (60th)	Oliver Platt	Nip/Tuck	Freddie Prune	FX
2008 (60th)	Stanley Tucci	ER	Dr. Kevin Moretti	NBC
2008 (60th)	Robin Williams	Law & Order: Special Victims Unit	Merritt Rook	NBC
2009 (61st)
2009 (61st)	Michael J. Fox	Rescue Me	Dwight	FX
2009 (61st)	Ed Asner	CSI: NY	Abraham Klein	CBS
2009 (61st)	Ernest Borgnine	ER	Paul Manning	NBC
2009 (61st)	Ted Danson	Damages	Arthur Frobisher	FX
2009 (61st)	Jimmy Smits	Dexter	Miguel Prado	Showtime

=== 2010s ===
Year	Actor	Program	Role	Episode	Network
2010 (62nd)
2010 (62nd)	John Lithgow	Dexter	Arthur Mitchell	"Road Kill"	Showtime
2010 (62nd)	Dylan Baker	The Good Wife	Colin Sweeney	"Bad"	CBS
2010 (62nd)	Beau Bridges	The Closer	George Andrews	"Make Over"	TNT
2010 (62nd)	Alan Cumming	The Good Wife	Eli Gold	"Fleas"	CBS
2010 (62nd)	Ted Danson	Damages	Arthur Frobisher	"The Next One's Gonna Go in Your Throat"	FX
2010 (62nd)	Gregory Itzin	24	Charles Logan	"1:00 p.m. – 2:00 p.m."	Fox
2010 (62nd)	Robert Morse	Mad Men	Bert Cooper	"Shut the Door. Have a Seat."	AMC
2011 (63rd)
2011 (63rd)	Paul McCrane	Harry's Law	Josh Peyton	"With Friends Like These"	NBC
2011 (63rd)	Beau Bridges	Brothers & Sisters	Nicholas Brody	"Brody"	ABC
2011 (63rd)	Jeremy Davies	Justified	Dickie Bennett	"Reckoning"	FX
2011 (63rd)	Bruce Dern	Big Love	Frank Harlow	"D.I.V.O.R.C.E."	HBO
2011 (63rd)	Michael J. Fox	The Good Wife	Louis Canning	"Real Deal"	CBS
2011 (63rd)	Robert Morse	Mad Men	Bert Cooper	"Blowing Smoke"	AMC
2012 (64th)
2012 (64th)	Jeremy Davies	Justified	Dickie Bennett	"Coalition"	FX
2012 (64th)	Dylan Baker	The Good Wife	Colin Sweeney	"Marthas and Caitlins"	CBS
2012 (64th)	Ben Feldman	Mad Men	Michael Ginsberg	"Dark Shadows"	AMC
2012 (64th)	Michael J. Fox	The Good Wife	Louis Canning	"Parenting Made Easy"	CBS
2012 (64th)	Mark Margolis	Breaking Bad	Héctor "Tio" Salamanca	"Face Off"	AMC
2012 (64th)	Jason Ritter	Parenthood	Mark St. Cyr	"Politics"	NBC
2013 (65th)
2013 (65th)	Dan Bucatinsky	Scandal	James Novak	"Nobody Likes Babies"	ABC
2013 (65th)	Michael J. Fox	The Good Wife	Louis Canning	"Boom De Ah Dah"	CBS
2013 (65th)	Rupert Friend	Homeland	Peter Quinn	"Q&A"	Showtime
2013 (65th)	Harry Hamlin	Mad Men	Jim Cutler	"A Tale of Two Cities"	AMC
2013 (65th)	Nathan Lane	The Good Wife	Clarke Hayden	"I Fought the Law"	CBS
2013 (65th)	Robert Morse	Mad Men	Bert Cooper	"For Immediate Release"	AMC
2014 (66th)
2014 (66th)	Joe Morton	Scandal	Rowan Pope	"Guess Who's Coming to Dinner"	ABC
2014 (66th)	Dylan Baker	The Good Wife	Colin Sweeney	"Tying the Knot"	CBS
2014 (66th)	Beau Bridges	Masters of Sex	Barton Scully	"Manhigh"	Showtime
2014 (66th)	Reg E. Cathey	House of Cards	Freddy Hayes	"Chapter 22"	Netflix
2014 (66th)	Paul Giamatti	Downton Abbey	Harold Levinson	"Chapter 8"	PBS
2014 (66th)	Robert Morse	Mad Men	Bert Cooper	"Waterloo"	AMC
2015 (67th)
2015 (67th)	Reg E. Cathey	House of Cards	Freddy Hayes	"Chapter 34"	Netflix
2015 (67th)	F. Murray Abraham	Homeland	Dar Adal	"Long Time Coming"	Showtime
2015 (67th)	Alan Alda	The Blacklist	Alan Fitch	"The Decembrist"	NBC
2015 (67th)	Beau Bridges	Masters of Sex	Barton Scully	"Parallax"	Showtime
2015 (67th)	Michael J. Fox	The Good Wife	Louis Canning	"Red Zone"	CBS
2015 (67th)	Pablo Schreiber	Orange Is the New Black	George "Pornstache" Mendez	"40 Oz. of Furlough"	Netflix
2016 (68th)
2016 (68th)	Hank Azaria	Ray Donovan	Ed Cochran	"One Night in Yerevan"	Showtime
2016 (68th)	Mahershala Ali	House of Cards	Remy Danton	"Chapter 44"	Netflix
2016 (68th)	Reg E. Cathey	House of Cards	Freddy Hayes	"Chapter 50"	Netflix
2016 (68th)	Michael J. Fox	The Good Wife	Louis Canning	"Taxed"	CBS
2016 (68th)	Paul Sparks	House of Cards	Thomas Yates	"Chapter 49"	Netflix
2016 (68th)	Max von Sydow	Game of Thrones	The Three-Eyed Raven	"The Door"	HBO
2017 (69th)
2017 (69th)	Gerald McRaney	This Is Us	Dr. Nathan Katowski	"The Big Day"	' NBC
2017 (69th)	Hank Azaria	Ray Donovan	Ed Cochran	"Norman Saves the World"	Showtime
2017 (69th)	Brian Tyree Henry	This Is Us	Ricky	"Memphis"	NBC
2017 (69th)	Ben Mendelsohn	Bloodline	Danny Rayburn	"Part 32"	Netflix
2017 (69th)	Denis O'Hare	This Is Us	Jessie	"Last Christmas"	NBC
2017 (69th)	BD Wong	Mr. Robot	Whiterose	"eps2.3_logic-b0mb.hc"	USA
2018 (70th)
2018 (70th)	Ron Cephas Jones	This Is Us	William Hill	"A Father's Advice"	NBC
2018 (70th)	F. Murray Abraham	Homeland	Dar Adal	"All In"	Showtime
2018 (70th)	Cameron Britton	Mindhunter	Ed Kemper	"Episode 2"	Netflix
2018 (70th)	Matthew Goode	The Crown	Antony Armstrong-Jones	"Matrimonium"	Netflix
2018 (70th)	Gerald McRaney	This Is Us	Dr. Nathan Katowski	"The Car"	NBC
2018 (70th)	Jimmi Simpson	Westworld	William	"Reunion"	HBO
2019 (71st)
2019 (71st)	Bradley Whitford	The Handmaid's Tale	Joseph Lawrence	"Postpartum"	Hulu
2019 (71st)	Michael Angarano	This Is Us	Nick Pearson	"Songbird Road: Part One"	NBC
2019 (71st)	Ron Cephas Jones	This Is Us	William Hill	"A Philadelphia Story"	NBC
2019 (71st)	Michael McKean	Better Call Saul	Chuck McGill	"Winner"	AMC
2019 (71st)	Kumail Nanjiani	The Twilight Zone	Samir Wassan	"The Comedian"	CBS All Access
2019 (71st)	Glynn Turman	How to Get Away with Murder	Nate Lahey, Sr.	"It Was the Worst Day of My Life"	ABC

=== 2020s ===
Year	Actor	Program	Role	Episode	Network
2020 (72nd)
2020 (72nd)	Ron Cephas Jones	This Is Us	William Hill	"After the Fire"	NBC
2020 (72nd)	Jason Bateman	The Outsider	Terry Maitland	"Fish in a Barrel"	HBO
2020 (72nd)	James Cromwell	Succession	Ewan Roy	"Dundee"	HBO
2020 (72nd)	Giancarlo Esposito	The Mandalorian	Moff Gideon	"Chapter 8: Redemption"	Disney+
2020 (72nd)	Andrew Scott	Black Mirror	Chris Gillhaney	"Smithereens"	Netflix
2020 (72nd)	Martin Short	The Morning Show	Dick Lundy	"Chaos Is the New Cocaine"	Apple TV+
2021 (73rd)
2021 (73rd)	Courtney B. Vance	Lovecraft Country	George Freeman	"Whitey's on the Moon"	HBO
2021 (73rd)	Don Cheadle	The Falcon and the Winter Soldier	James Rhodes	"New World Order"	Disney+
2021 (73rd)	Charles Dance	The Crown	Lord Mountbatten	"Gold Stick"	Netflix
2021 (73rd)	Timothy Olyphant	The Mandalorian	Cobb Vanth	"Chapter 9: The Marshal"	Disney+
2021 (73rd)	Carl Weathers	The Mandalorian	Greef Karga	"Chapter 12: The Siege"	Disney+
2022 (74th)
2022 (74th)	Colman Domingo	Euphoria	Ali Muhammad	"Ruminations: Big and Little Bullys"	HBO
2022 (74th)	Adrien Brody	Succession	Josh Aaronson	"Lion in the Meadow"	HBO
2022 (74th)	James Cromwell	Succession	Ewan Roy	"Retired Janitors of Idaho"	HBO
2022 (74th)	Arian Moayed	Succession	Stewy Hosseini	"Retired Janitors of Idaho"	HBO
2022 (74th)	Tom Pelphrey	Ozark	Ben Davis	"You're the Boss"	Netflix
2022 (74th)	Alexander Skarsgård	Succession	Lukas Matsson	"All the Bells Say"	HBO
2023 (75th)
2023 (75th)	Nick Offerman	The Last of Us	Bill	"Long, Long Time"	HBO
2023 (75th)	Murray Bartlett	The Last of Us	Frank	"Long, Long Time"	HBO
2023 (75th)	James Cromwell	Succession	Ewan Roy	"Church and State"	HBO
2023 (75th)	Lamar Johnson	The Last of Us	Henry Burrell	"Endure and Survive"	HBO
2023 (75th)	Arian Moayed	Succession	Stewy Hosseini	"Honeymoon States"	HBO
2023 (75th)	Keivonn Woodard	The Last of Us	Sam Burrell	"Endure and Survive"	HBO
2024 (76th)
2024 (76th)	Néstor Carbonell	Shōgun	Vasco Rodrigues	"Anjin"	FX
2024 (76th)	Paul Dano	Mr. & Mrs. Smith	Harris Materbach	"A Breakup"	Prime Video
2024 (76th)	Tracy Letts	Winning Time	Jack McKinney	"The New World"	HBO
2024 (76th)	Jonathan Pryce	Slow Horses	David Cartwright	"Footprints"	Apple TV+
2024 (76th)	John Turturro	Mr. & Mrs. Smith	Eric Shane	"Second Date"	Prime Video
2025 (77th)
2025 (77th)	Shawn Hatosy	The Pitt	Dr. Jack Abbot	"9:00 P.M."	HBO Max
2025 (77th)	Giancarlo Esposito	The Boys	Stan Edgar	"Beware the Jabberwock, My Son"	Prime Video
2025 (77th)	Scott Glenn	The White Lotus	Jim Hollinger	"Killer Instincts"	HBO
2025 (77th)	Joe Pantoliano	The Last of Us	Eugene	"The Price"	HBO
2025 (77th)	Forest Whitaker	Andor	Saw Gerrera	"I Have Friends Everywhere"	Disney+
2025 (77th)	Jeffrey Wright	The Last of Us	Isaac	"Day One"	HBO
2026 (78th)
2026 (78th)	Ernest Harden Jr.	The Pitt	Louie Cloverfield	"7:00 A.M."	HBO Max
2026 (78th)	Colman Domingo	Euphoria	Ali Muhammad	"In God We Trust"	HBO
2026 (78th)	Jeff Hiller	Pluribus	Larry	"Please, Carol"	Apple TV
2026 (78th)	Jeff Kober	The Pitt	Duke Ekins	"8:00 P.M."	HBO Max
2026 (78th)	Jonathan Pryce	Slow Horses	David Cartwright	"Scars"	Apple TV
2026 (78th)	Bradley Whitford	The Diplomat	Todd Penn	"Amagansett"	Netflix

== Performers with multiple wins ==
2 wins

- Charles S. Dutton (consecutive)
- Ed Asner
- Ron Cephas Jones
- John Lithgow
- Patrick McGoohan

== Programs with multiple wins ==
6 wins

- The Practice (5 consecutive)

3 wins

- This Is Us (2 consecutive)

2 wins

- Columbo
- The Pitt (consecutive)
- Scandal (consecutive)

== Performers with multiple nominations ==
7 nominations

- Michael J. Fox

5 nominations

- Beau Bridges
- James Cromwell
- Robert Morse

4 nominations

- Charles Durning

3 nominations

- Dylan Baker
- Reg E. Cathey
- Charles S. Dutton
- Harold Gould
- Ron Cephas Jones

2 nominations

- F. Murray Abraham
- Alan Alda
- Hank Azaria
- Bill Bixby
- Don Cheadle
- Christian Clemenson
- Ted Danson
- Jeremy Davies
- Colman Domingo
- Giancarlo Esposito
- Will Geer
- Louis Gossett Jr.
- John Glover
- Michael Jeter
- James Earl Jones
- Richard Kiley
- Martin Landau
- John Larroquette
- John Lithgow
- Tim Matheson
- Patrick McGoohan
- Gerald McRaney
- Arian Moayed
- Oliver Platt
- Matthew Perry
- Jonathan Pryce
- Robert Reed
- Glynn Turman
- Forest Whitaker
- Bradley Whitford
- James Whitmore
- Robin Williams

== Programs with multiple nominations ==
14 nominations

- ER

11 nominations

- The Practice

10 nominations

- The Good Wife

8 nominations

- This Is Us

7 nominations

- Mad Men
- Succession
- The West Wing

6 nominations

- The Last of Us
- St. Elsewhere

5 nominations

- Chicago Hope
- House of Cards
- Picket Fences

3 nominations

- Boston Legal
- Homeland
- Homicide: Life on the Street
- L.A. Law
- The Mandalorian
- Midnight Caller
- The Pitt
- thirtysomething
- Touched by an Angel
- Without a Trace

2 nominations

- Cagney & Lacey
- Columbo
- The Crown
- Damages
- Dexter
- Euphoria
- Justified
- Masters of Sex
- Moonlighting
- Mr. & Mrs. Smith
- Ray Donovan
- Rescue Me
- Scandal
- Slow Horses
- The Sopranos
- Studio 60 on the Sunset Strip
- Tales from the Crypt

== See also ==
- TCA Award for Individual Achievement in Drama
- Critics' Choice Television Award for Best Guest Performer in a Drama Series
- Golden Globe Award for Best Supporting Actor – Series, Miniseries or Television Film
- Screen Actors Guild Award for Outstanding Performance by a Male Actor in a Drama Series
