= The Special Relationship (Big Love) =

- Big Love episode
- Episode no.: Season 5 Episode 5
- Directed by: David Petrarca
- Written by: Patricia Breen
- Cinematography by: Rob Sweeney
- Editing by: Chris Figler
- Original release date: February 13, 2011
- Running time: 59 minutes

Guest appearances
- Bruce Dern as Frank Harlow; Daveigh Chase as Rhonda Volmer; Gregory Itzin as Senator Barn; Joel McKinnon Miller as Don Embry; Christian Campbell as Greg Ivey; Robert Clotworthy as Elder McCrackle; Christopher Hanke as Stuart; Cody Klop as Gary Embry; Kevin Rankin as Verlan Walker; Grant Show as Michael Sainte; Audrey Wasilewski as Pam Martin

Episode chronology
← Previous "The Oath"	Next → "D.I.V.O.R.C.E."

"The Special Relationship" is the fifth episode of the fifth season of the American drama television series Big Love. It is the 48th overall episode of the series and was written by supervising producer Patricia Breen, and directed by David Petrarca. It originally aired on HBO on February 13, 2011.

The series is set in Salt Lake City and follows Bill Henrickson, a fundamentalist Mormon. He practices polygamy, having Barbara, Nicki and Margie as his wives. The series charts the family's life in and out of the public sphere in their suburb, as well as their associations with a fundamentalist compound in the area. In the episode, Bill realizes that adopting Cara Lynn will require him to divorce Barbara, while Verlan acts as an enforcer for Alby.

According to Nielsen Media Research, the episode was seen by an estimated 0.99 million household viewers and gained a 0.4/1 ratings share among adults aged 18–49. The episode received mostly positive reviews from critics, who praised the storylines and performances.

== Plot ==
Bill (Bill Paxton) begins his Senate duties. Barn (Gregory Itzin) is willing to move past their previous arguments over the impeachment if Bill avoids another PR disaster. Bill agrees, and also asks for funds for Safety Net, which Barn immediately obtains. Bill decides to let Margie (Ginnifer Goodwin) talk to the press on behalf of their family, confident that she can handle it.

Verlan (Kevin Rankin) visits Alby (Matt Ross) for help, as he is facing a possible manslaughter charge. Alby agrees to help him, but he needs to work as an enforcer for him. To legally adopt Cara Lynn (Cassi Thomson), Bill needs to divorce Barbara (Jeanne Tripplehorn), as he and Nicki (Chloë Sevigny) cannot adopt as they are not legally married. Nicki is delighted upon hearing the news, and despite Bill forbidding her from influencing Barbara, she explains that she needs to stay close to Cara Lynn as she fears that Rhonda (Daveigh Chase) will be a bad influence on her.

On Alby's orders, Verlan attacks Don (Joel McKinnon Miller) during a fishing trip with his family, but Verlan realizes that his job is not finished yet. Lois (Grace Zabriskie) refuses to accept her dementia diagnosis, and calls Frank (Bruce Dern) to get her out of the house. Bill interferes and reveals her diagnosis to Frank, who subsequently leaves without her. Despite her complaints, Bill refuses to let her stay alone or unsupervised. Fearing that her mother is not considering her feelings, Cara Lynn decides to move in with Greg (Christian Campbell). Bill is asked by LDS officials to refrain from referring to himself as a Mormon, as they fear he is tainting their image by linking it to polygamy, but Bill refuses. At an intern mixer, Barbara finally tells Bill that she will agree to the divorce.

== Production ==
=== Development ===
The episode was written by supervising producer Patricia Breen, and directed by David Petrarca. This was Breen's third writing credit, and Petrarca's seventh directing credit.

== Reception ==
=== Viewers ===
In its original American broadcast, "The Special Relationship" was seen by an estimated 0.99 million household viewers with a 0.4/1 in the 18–49 demographics. This means that 0.4 percent of all households with televisions watched the episode, while 1 percent of all of those watching television at the time of the broadcast watched it. This was a 28% increase in viewership from the previous episode, which was seen by an estimated 0.77 million household viewers with a 0.4/1 in the 18–49 demographics.

=== Critical reviews ===
"The Special Relationship" received mostly positive reviews from critics. Emily St. James of The A.V. Club gave the episode a "B+" grade and wrote, "Every season of Big Love, there's an episode or two that goes in for red, hot doctrinal differences, and “The Special Relationship” was that episode for this season. These episodes are always best when they tie those ideas in to some sort of personal relationship between the characters (since doctrinal differences so rarely make for satisfying drama), and “Relationship” struggled with that until, somewhat predictably at this point, the last half."

Alan Sepinwall of HitFix wrote, "Tonight's episode at least dealt with some interesting issues, with the “priesthood holder” issue moving to the forefront, Margene's ambition colliding with her reputation and Bill perhaps taking Barb a bridge too far with his latest request." James Poniewozik of TIME wrote, "His first wife may have come to plural marriage later in life, but it’s clear here that she has convictions about it as deep as his, even if they are not the same as his own. And as they find in more than one way, making a seemingly symbolic gesture — being ending a legal marriage or making a semantic deal with the LDS — is no small thing. They call it the Principle for a reason."

Megan Angelo of The Wall Street Journal wrote, "All is well in this episode of Big Love - for about five minutes, anyway. And then we're swiftly deposited back into the endless bickering match that is this final season." Aileen Gallagher of Vulture wrote, "Barbara Henrickson long seemed like the only sane member of her family, the only one who wasn't damaged goods from the start. On last night's Big Love, we saw her stand up for herself at last. Never have we cheered at a divorce announcement."

Allyssa Lee of Los Angeles Times wrote, "We've reached the halfway point of Big Love's final season, folks. And for a hot second during this episode, titled “The Special Relationship,” it almost looked like things were looking up for the Henricksons." Mark Blankenship of HuffPost wrote, "This whole series is about special relationships, really, and the right to declare them, and I give props to writer Patricia Breen for corralling so many into an hour."
