= The Oath (Big Love) =

- Big Love episode
- Episode no.: Season 5 Episode 4
- Directed by: Omar Madha
- Written by: Melanie Marnich
- Cinematography by: Anette Haellmigk
- Editing by: Byron Smith
- Original release date: February 6, 2011
- Running time: 58 minutes

Guest appearances
- Daveigh Chase as Rhonda Volmer; Gregory Itzin as Senator Barn; Joel McKinnon Miller as Don Embry; Tina Majorino as Heather Tuttle; Christian Campbell as Greg Ivey; Christopher Hanke as Stuart; Judith Hoag as Cindy Price; Cody Klop as Gary Embry; Kevin Rankin as Verlan Walker; Daniel Roebuck as Jeff; Cristine Rose as Evelyn Linton; Audrey Wasilewski as Pam Martin; Thomas F. Wilson as Ricky Jax; Rebecca Wisocky as Emma Smith

Episode chronology
← Previous "Certain Poor Shepherds"	Next → "The Special Relationship"

"The Oath" is the fourth episode of the fifth season of the American drama television series Big Love. It is the 47th overall episode of the series and was written by co-producer Melanie Marnich, and directed by Omar Madha. It originally aired on HBO on February 6, 2011.

The series is set in Salt Lake City and follows Bill Henrickson, a fundamentalist Mormon. He practices polygamy, having Barbara, Nicki and Margie as his wives. The series charts the family's life in and out of the public sphere in their suburb, as well as their associations with a fundamentalist compound in the area. In the episode, Bill prepares to be sworn in, while Cara Lynn reunites with her cousin.

According to Nielsen Media Research, the episode was seen by an estimated 0.77 million household viewers and gained a 0.4/1 ratings share among adults aged 18–49. The episode received positive reviews from critics, although some criticized its pacing.

== Plot ==
With a few days before being sworn in, Bill (Bill Paxton) makes some appearances to boost his image. After Margie (Ginnifer Goodwin) revealed her real age, Nicki (Chloë Sevigny) grants her a fake birth certificate to avoid more problems with the family.

Barbara (Jeanne Tripplehorn) decides to attend a First Ladies' fashion show, surprising Cindy (Judith Hoag). Bill is informed by Barn (Gregory Itzin) that he is losing support in the Capitol, and suggests that he might even be impeached on his inauguration. Nicki decides that Bill should adopt Cara Lynn (Cassi Thomson), who has been distracted over her father's fate during her sessions with Greg (Christian Campbell). Nicki also has to deal with Adaleen (Mary Kay Place) constantly surveilling the Safety Net reunions, with Alby (Matt Ross) supporting Adaleen's actions.

Bill tells Lois (Grace Zabriskie) that she has been diagnosed with dementia, and he blames Frank for her condition as he gave her herpes a few years ago. He and Don (Joel McKinnon Miller) manage to recoup their shares from the casino, but Don is infuriated upon learning about Margie's real age. Cara Lynn and Gary (Luke Klop) go to the mall with Ben (Douglas Smith) and Heather (Tina Majorino). There, Cara Lynn reunites with her cousin, Verlan (Kevin Rankin). However, Verlan introduces his wife, Rhonda (Daveigh Chase), surprising them. Rhonda claims she has changed and apologizes for her actions, but Ben and Heather remain skeptical.

Tensions continue arising between Margie and the rest of the family, with Barbara ignoring her and Nicki insulting her. Per Bill's insistence, Margie and Nicki go to meet Barbara at the fashion show, where Nicki says Barbara is to blame for Margie's seduction, something that Barbara confesses. Margie confronts Bill outside the Capitol, and demands an explanation. When Bill does not answer, Margie accidentally him with the car. At the hospital, Bill dreams that he interacts with Emma Smith (Rebecca Wisocky). Despite his condition, the Senate looks to move up the swearing to discredit Bill. Bill decides to leave the hospital, and with the help of his wives, makes it in time. The episode ends as Bill officially swears in.

== Production ==
=== Development ===
The episode was written by co-producer Melanie Marnich, and directed by Omar Madha. This was Marnich's third writing credit, and Madha's first directing credit.

== Reception ==
=== Viewers ===
In its original American broadcast, "The Oath" was seen by an estimated 0.77 million household viewers with a 0.4/1 in the 18–49 demographics. This means that 0.4 percent of all households with televisions watched the episode, while 1 percent of all of those watching television at the time of the broadcast watched it. This was a 26% decrease in viewership from the previous episode, which was seen by an estimated 1.03 million household viewers with a 0.4/1 in the 18–49 demographics.

=== Critical reviews ===
"The Oath" received positive reviews from critics. Emily St. James of The A.V. Club gave the episode a "B" grade and wrote, "If you believe in God, sometimes all you want is to be certain He doesn't exist. I often feel that way about the characters on Big Love, particularly the ones in “The Oath,” which mixes some sublime moments of often raw power and doubt with, well, with Bill getting applauded by a handful of people in the state Senate chamber after he makes a valiant stand for his right to be sworn in."

James Poniewozik of TIME wrote, "Whatever message Bill takes from that, as he wakes and takes the oath of office, one thing is clear: people may die off, but lies, and their effects, outlive them." Megan Angelo of The Wall Street Journal wrote, "Tonight's episode found the Henricksons still reeling from Margene's admission - Nicki especially. Though, ever-resourceful, Nicki has procured Margene a new birth certificate that officially makes her five years older, she's still gunning for the youngest wife."

Aileen Gallagher of Vulture wrote, "Bill Henrickson barely managed to get sworn in to the Utah State Senate last night on Big Love, but it was the women in his life who steered the episode. Last week's revelation that Margene was 16 when she married Bill may stay out of public view, but this bit of youthful dirty laundry threatens the family's core convictions." Allyssa Lee of Los Angeles Times wrote, "It was another jam-packed week as January finally arrived in Sandy, and Bill prepared to be sworn into office. This episode, called ‘The Oath,’ mixed hallowed words with primal actions in a button-pushing hour that touched on topics such as patriarchal church culture, revisionist history and women's rights."

TV Fanatic gave the episode a 2.5 star rating out of 5 and wrote, "With this being the last season and all, I guess I am just expecting more out of each character and I feel like they just aren't bringing it. Don't get me wrong, I am thoroughly entertained with each episode that passes, but I keep pondering more and more how the writers will be able to really tie everything up." Mark Blankenship of HuffPost considered that the episode "has considerable highs and considerable lows."
