= Certain Poor Shepherds =

- Big Love episode
- Episode no.: Season 5 Episode 3
- Directed by: David Petrarca
- Written by: Jami O'Brien
- Cinematography by: Rob Sweeney
- Editing by: Louise A. Innes
- Original release date: January 30, 2011
- Running time: 59 minutes

Guest appearances
- Gregory Itzin as Senator Barn; Christian Campbell as Greg Ivey; Anne Dudek as Lura Grant; Carlos Jacott as Carl Martin; Cody Klop as Gary Embry; Tina Majorino as Heather Tuttle; Audrey Wasilewski as Pam Martin; Kate McNeil as Sister Mary; Kate Norby as Glory; Hank Cheyne as Austin Buttercup

Episode chronology
← Previous "A Seat at the Table"	Next → "The Oath"

"Certain Poor Shepherds" is the third episode of the fifth season of the American drama television series Big Love. It is the 46th overall episode of the series and was written by Jami O'Brien, and directed by David Petrarca. It originally aired on HBO on January 30, 2011.

The series is set in Salt Lake City and follows Bill Henrickson, a fundamentalist Mormon. He practices polygamy, having Barbara, Nicki and Margie as his wives. The series charts the family's life in and out of the public sphere in their suburb, as well as their associations with a fundamentalist compound in the area. In the episode, Bill tries to host a heartwarming Christmas with his family, but revelations and conflicts prevent it.

According to Nielsen Media Research, the episode was seen by an estimated 1.03 million household viewers and gained a 0.4/1 ratings share among adults aged 18–49. The episode received mostly positive reviews from critics, who praised the revelations and character development.

== Plot ==
The Henricksons prepare for Christmas, while Alby (Matt Ross) is less thrilled with the holiday in Juniper Creek. Cara Lynn (Cassi Thomson) lies to skip classes with Greg (Christian Campbell), instead hanging out with Gary (Luke Klop). Ben (Douglas Smith) is surprised when Heather (Tina Majorino) returns, and decides to spend more time with her.

Fed up with Alby's methods, Lura (Anne Dudek) flees Juniper Creek with her children. She asks Bill (Bill Paxton) for help, and he gets them to stay at a family shelter. Alby also kicks out Adaleen (Mary Kay Place) out of her house, forcing her to stay with Nicki (Chloë Sevigny). When neither Adaleen nor Nicki open up about J.J.'s whereabouts, Cara Lynn decides to go to Juniper Creek to find out the truth. With Gary's help, they reach the clinic, and Cara Lynn is devastated to find the dilapidated state. When she confronts Adaleen over the truth, Adaleen finally admits about his experiments and his death.

Bill faces pressure when a doctor tells him that Lois (Grace Zabriskie) is diagnosed with dementia, and also discovers that the Blackfoot Magic Casino has been remodeled without his permission under new leadership. Bill also surprises his wives by giving them permissions to carry guns, which is why he was constantly asking Margie (Ginnifer Goodwin) for her driver's licence, and this draws mixed reactions from them. During Christmas' Eve dinner, Bill once again asks for her licence and she finally reveals to the family that she lied to everyone about her age; she and Bill actually married when she was sixteen, shocking them as the age of consent in the state is eighteen. Bill, Nicki and Barbara (Jeanne Tripplehorn) subsequently sideline Margie, devastating her.

On Christmas morning, the Henricksons volunteer at a shelter. During this, Cara Lynn confronts Nicki over her discovery, and Nicki breaks down over the tragic events. Alby tries to take Lura and his family back to Juniper Creek, until Bill attacks him and orders him to leave. That night, Bill and his family find that Barbara has been drinking, lamenting her situation. Adaleen returns to Juniper Creek, having thrown away her pregnancy medication, and is welcomed back by Alby.

== Production ==
=== Development ===
The episode was written by Jami O'Brien, and directed by David Petrarca. This was O'Brien's first writing credit, and Petrarca's sixth directing credit.

== Reception ==
=== Viewers ===
In its original American broadcast, "Certain Poor Shepherds" was seen by an estimated 1.03 million household viewers with a 0.4/1 in the 18–49 demographics. This means that 0.4 percent of all households with televisions watched the episode, while 1 percent of all of those watching television at the time of the broadcast watched it. This was a slight decrease in viewership from the previous episode, which was seen by an estimated 1.12 million household viewers with a 0.5/1 in the 18–49 demographics.

=== Critical reviews ===
"Certain Poor Shepherds" received mostly positive reviews from critics. Emily St. James of The A.V. Club gave the episode a "B+" grade and wrote, "“Certain Poor Shepherds” definitely has a chaotic first half, where it seems like the show has temporarily taken leave of its sanity, but once the second half rolls around, the dominoes fall in such a satisfying fashion that it's easy enough to forget all of the misgivings and just go with some of the more implausible stuff."

Alan Sepinwall of HitFix wrote, "I thought there were some strong performances from Ginnifer Goodwin and Jeanne Tripplehorn, and I liked the Alby/Lura subplot, but mostly I feel about the show the way some people started to feel about Lost in its final seasons, which is that I'm fed up of the writers continually adding new problems to solve without having dealt with any of the pre-existing ones. Particularly since the never-ending plot engine keeps getting in the way of the character moments." James Poniewozik of TIME wrote, "The first two episodes of Big Love this season were a pretty grim affair, as the repercussions of problems and bad decisions from last season walloped the Henricksons repeatedly. “Certain Poor Shepherds” was — well, pretty grim as well, as the family was walloped by some new problems and the repercussions of another bad decision from the past. It was also, however, an emotionally focused and powerful episode that recalled some of the series' best days."

Aileen Gallagher of Vulture wrote, "The spirit of Christmas did not stop at the Henrickson's house(s) this season. Instead, a cloud of doom hangs over the family. In this episode alone, viewers are treated to dementia, maternal drunkenness, statutory rape, abortion, and murder. Bill appears unable to lead his flock, which may well be dissolved by series' end. It's all a little much, but we've come to expect excess from Big Love." Allyssa Lee of Los Angeles Times wrote, "As if there wasn't enough sugar hitting the fan this season, the Christmas episode, titled “Certain Poor Shepherds,” dropped so many bombs that the whole landscape has started to resemble a battle zone."

TV Fanatic gave the episode a 4 star rating out of 5 and wrote, "Although there were many shocking situations that went down on this week's episode, "Certain Poor Shepards," nothing was more surprising than finding out that Margene was only 16 when she married Bill, Barb, and Nikki." Mark Blankenship of HuffPost wrote, "Predictably enough, this episode plays like a launching pad for the rest of season, stuffing the plot with convenient revelations that can play out for the rest of series. On every HBO drama I watch, the third or fourth episode of the year always feels like it was written by Johnny Appleseed, tossing handfuls of storylines into the ground and leaving us to watch them grow."
