= D.I.V.O.R.C.E. (Big Love) =

- Big Love episode
- Episode no.: Season 5 Episode 6
- Directed by: Howard Deutch
- Written by: Mark V. Olsen; Will Scheffer
- Cinematography by: Rob Sweeney
- Editing by: Chris Figler
- Original release date: February 20, 2011
- Running time: 59 minutes

Guest appearances
- Ellen Burstyn as Nancy Dutton; Bruce Dern as Frank Harlow; Daveigh Chase as Rhonda Volmer; Joel McKinnon Miller as Don Embry; Robert Patrick as Bud Mayberry; Judith Ivey as Renee Clayton; Kevin Rankin as Verlan Walker; Christian Campbell as Greg Ivey; Judith Hoag as Cindy Price; Carlos Jacott as Carl Martin; Cody Klop as Gary Embry; Tina Majorino as Heather Tuttle; Wendy Phillips as Peg Embry; Grant Show as Michael Sainte; Audrey Wasilewski as Pam Martin

Episode chronology
| ← Previous "The Special Relationship" | Next → "Til Death Do Us Part" |

"D.I.V.O.R.C.E." is the sixth episode of the fifth season of the American drama television series Big Love. It is the 49th overall episode of the series and was written by series creators Mark V. Olsen and Will Scheffer, and directed by Howard Deutch. It originally aired on HBO on February 20, 2011.

The series is set in Salt Lake City and follows Bill Henrickson, a fundamentalist Mormon. He practices polygamy, having Barbara, Nicki and Margie as his wives. The series charts the family's life in and out of the public sphere in their suburb, as well as their associations with a fundamentalist compound in the area. In the episode, Barbara gets into a conflict with her mother and sister over the priesthood, while Bill seeks to maintain control within the compounds.

According to Nielsen Media Research, the episode was seen by an estimated 1.04 million household viewers and gained a 0.5/1 ratings share among adults aged 18–49. The episode received mostly positive reviews from critics, who praised the conflicts and second half of the episode.

== Plot ==
As she prepares her divorce with Bill (Bill Paxton), Barbara (Jeanne Tripplehorn) goes to the University of Utah to talk with ex-Mormon feminist Renee Clayton (Judith Ivey), hoping to help her case of priesthood. Margie (Ginnifer Goodwin) assembles a pro-polygamy children's rally, and asks Michael Sainte (Grant Show) to sponsor the rally.

After discovering that Don (Joel McKinnon Miller) is still alive, Alby (Matt Ross) demands that Verlan (Kevin Rankin) return the money. When Verlan cannot complete the debt, he instead kisses Alby to settle his debt. Bill is later called by Bud Mayberry (Robert Patrick), who reveals that Alby will no longer cooperate with the State and plans to "abolish" Bill from his "purist" compound. Nicki (Chloë Sevigny) is worried over Cara Lynn (Cassi Thomson) spending more time with Greg (Christian Campbell), unaware that they have started a secret relationship. Despite Bill's insistence, Lois (Grace Zabriskie) decides to move back with Frank (Bruce Dern), but the latter is angry that his wives left him after Barbara told them he gave herpes to Lois. Lois makes Frank promise to kill her

Concerned over her meeting with Renee, Nancy (Ellen Burstyn) and Cindy (Judith Hoag) talk with Barbara, and Nancy even suggests Barbara is having an affair with Renee. They subsequently have dinner with her, and Renee makes another suggestion at lesbianism. Bill and Don meet with Alby, and Bill threatens to pull funding from Juniper Creek if he leaves the Safety Net, but Alby is still not scared. Later, Bill and Barbara talk to Nicki, revealing that while Nicki will now be his legal wife, Barbara will still be in charge of the family's finances, leading to a severe argument between Nicki and Barbara. Bill and Barbara also have another argument over her priesthood, and Barbara decides that she cannot attend his church as she no longer believes in its foundation. Ben (Douglas Smith) goes to a strip club bar, discovering that Rhonda (Daveigh Chase) works as a pole dancer.

== Production ==
=== Development ===
The episode was written by series creators Mark V. Olsen and Will Scheffer, and directed by Howard Deutch. This was Olsen's 20th writing credit, Scheffer's 20th writing credit, and Deutch's first directing credit.

== Reception ==
=== Viewers ===
In its original American broadcast, "D.I.V.O.R.C.E." was seen by an estimated 1.04 million household viewers with a 0.5/1 in the 18–49 demographics. This means that 0.5 percent of all households with televisions watched the episode, while 1 percent of all of those watching television at the time of the broadcast watched it. This was a slight increase in viewership from the previous episode, which was seen by an estimated 0.99 million household viewers with a 0.4/1 in the 18–49 demographics.

=== Critical reviews ===
"D.I.V.O.R.C.E." received mostly positive reviews from critics. Emily St. James of The A.V. Club gave the episode a "B+" grade and wrote, "“D.I.V.O.R.C.E.,” like every episode of Big Love this season, veers wildly from what seems like it's going to develop into the best episode of the season to incredibly awful, sometimes within the same scene. But by the end of it, I was filled with an intense desire to see next week's episode and if nothing else, that has to count for something."

Megan Angelo of The Wall Street Journal wrote, "Clearly Mr. Ivey is one of the few employees of the school system who doesn't know Nicki's wrath. But we bet he'll find out soon."

Aileen Gallagher of Vulture wrote, "Big Love caught its breath this week, easing us back into the discord with some hot divorce sex between Barb and Bill. The plot inched forward in a few places, but mostly we were treated to a tedious survey of nearly every relationship on the show to frame the arc for the final four episodes." Allyssa Lee of Los Angeles Times wrote, "As we continue through the second half of the season and the rift within the family became more and more pronounced, it’s as if a bleak chill has descended upon the households and settled into their very being."

TV Fanatic gave the episode a 4 star rating out of 5 and wrote, "There's only so many more episodes left of Big Love and I found it very surprising that the writers would take this unique show and bring in an overplayed plot line on TV these days. I'm referring to the overused and quite morally wrong student/teacher relationship that is blooming between Carolynn and her math teacher." Mark Blankenship of HuffPost wrote, "Do you guys remember that old SNL commercial for Bad Idea Jeans? Many characters in tonight's segment, "D.I.V.O.R.C.E." could front their new ad campaign. And for once on this show, most of the dunderheads are teenagers, not grown-ass men."
