= List of Zeke and Luther episodes =

The following is a list of episodes for the Disney XD sitcom Zeke and Luther. The series premiered on June 15, 2009, and concluded on April 2, 2012. The episodes are arranged in broadcast order.

== Series overview ==
| Season | Episodes | Originally released | |
| Season | Episodes | First released | Last released |
|---|---|---|---|
| 1 | 21 | June 15, 2009 | February 1, 2010 |
| 2 | 26 | March 15, 2010 | December 6, 2010 |
| 3 | 26 | February 28, 2011 | April 2, 2012 |

== Episodes ==
=== Season 1 (2009–10) ===
| No. overall | No. in season | Title | Directed by | Written by | Original release date | Prod. code | US viewers (millions) |
|---|---|---|---|---|---|---|---|
| 1 | 1 | "Bros Go Pro" | Joe Menendez | Jason Jordan | June 15, 2009 | 108 | 0.8 |
Ginger books Zeke and Luther to perform a skateboarding stunt for a local mattress salesman, by skating off a ramp and jumping over four king-size mattresses (approx. 30 feet). But when Zeke gets his toe stuck in a shower faucet and Luther sprains his neck playing video games, they nearly miss the event. This was the fourth episode made, but premiered as the first. Guest stars: John Kapelos as Discount Dave, Steve Purnick as Syd and Jake Short as Kenny Coffey
| 2 | 2 | "Donut Jockey" | Gregory Hobson | Boyd Hale | June 22, 2009 | 105 | 0.9 |
Zeke and Luther get jobs as delivery men at Don's Donuts, in order to pay for new skateboard parts. Luther gets hustled by bratty young children for free donuts, while Zeke makes frequent deliveries to an obsessed girl named Lisa Grubner who has a crush on him. Eventually, Zeke sets Lisa straight and Luther gets his "revenge" on the children. Guest stars: David Ury as Don, Abigail Mavity as Lisa Grubner, Bodhi Schultz as O'Malley #1, Kai Schultz as O'Malley #2 Absent: Daniel Curtis Lee as Kojo, Ryan Newman as Ginger
| 3 | 3 | "Crash and Learn" | Savage Steve Holland | Tom Burkhard | June 29, 2009 | 110 | 0.8 |
Zeke and Luther accidentally destroy the garden of their grumpy neighbor, Jumpsuit Johnson. They leave Kojo with the blame after his teethmarks were found on a piece of beef jerky. After an escapade involving disguises and being invited to dinner by their neighbor (which causes both a large amount of guilt), the two confess that they destroyed the garden and accept the punishment. Guest stars: A.D. Miles as Deputy Korn, Lawrence A. Mandley as Jumpsuit Johnson Absent: Ryan Newman as Ginger
| 4 | 4 | "Pilot" | Fred Savage | Matt Dearborn & Tom Burkhard | July 6, 2009 | 101 | N/A |
In this prequel episode, Zeke and Luther try to get skateboarding sponsorship. Zeke arranges for the two to skateboard into the "Tunnel of Terror" to impress his British neighbor, but Luther drops out when the two get in a fight. When Zeke does not return from the tunnel, Luther goes in to find him, and the two learn that the tunnel was not as dangerous as they thought. Zeke and Luther reconcile, and get a sponsorship and new skateboards. This episode was made to be first, but it premiered as the fourth episode. Guest stars: David Ury as Don, Juliet Holland-Rose as Olivia, Will Schaub as Diamond Jim Dantley
| 5 | 5 | "Cape Fear" | Gregory Hobson | Matt Dearborn | July 13, 2009 | 104 | N/A |
Zeke wants to have his own trademark skateboarding costume feature. Olivia volunteers to make him something, and gives him a cape, which he secretly does not like. Zeke feels obliged to wear it, not wanting to hurt her feelings. Meanwhile, Ozzie copies Luther's helmet style. Zeke eventually is forced to tell Olivia the truth after an incident involving an ice cream truck and Luther makes Ozzie a helmet of his own. Guest stars: Juliet Holland-Rose as Olivia, Nate Hartley as Ozzie
| 6 | 6 | "Skate Camp" | Roger Nygard | Devin Bunje & Nick Stanton | July 20, 2009 | 112 | N/A |
The guys open up a skateboarding camp to encourage children to take up the sport and Ozzie enrolls, but shows a lack of enthusiasm. He also shows a fear of getting hurt. Zeke and Luther try to make him realize that getting hurt is just part of skateboarding. Meanwhile, Ginger and Lisa plan a flute-playing competition. Zeke eventually helps Ozzie to overcome his fears, and Ginger and Lisa come to a draw in their competition. Guest stars: David Ury as Don, Nate Hartley as Ozzie, Abigail Mavity as Lisa Grubner Absent: Daniel Curtis Lee as Kojo
| 7 | 7 | "Luck Be a Rodent Tonight" | Sean McNamara | Matt Dearborn & Tom Burkhard | July 27, 2009 | 102 | 0.6 |
Zeke and Luther try to make a skateboarding video after Kojo gets his mom to film one. They convince Garrett "Stinky Cast" Delfino, who has a crush on Ginger, to film it, and come out with a great video, but Luther's "good luck charm" rat (named Lucky) eats the tape on the night that Zeke and Luther plan to present it to a large audience. The audience then walks out, leaving the two humiliated. Zeke gets angry at Luther, and makes him stop using good luck charms. However, Zeke and Luther are not done with Lucky, who winds up in the hands of Jumpsuit Johnson. The two then sneak into his garage in ninja uniforms and steal the rat back. Guest stars: Juliet Holland-Rose as Olivia, Lawrence A. Mandley as Jumpsuit Johnson, Andy Pessoa as Stinky Cast
| 8 | 8 | "The Big Red Stacking Machine" | Joe Menendez | Matt Dearborn | August 3, 2009 | 109 | N/A |
Zeke and Luther are preparing to set a new two-man butt-boarding record. And things seem set until their training gets interrupted by Luther's new-found fascination with cup stacking. Possessing a natural talent for the sport, Luther fakes a stomach ache so he can get out of butt-board training with Zeke and enter a local cup stacking tournament. After learning that Luther has won the cup stacking tournament, Zeke enlists Stinky Cast to be his new butt-boarding partner. Guest stars: Ian Reed Kessler as Johnnie Lee Onion, David Ury as Don, Andy Pessoa as Stinky Cast, Ron Fassler as Dale Davis Absent: Daniel Curtis Lee as Kojo, Ryan Newman as Ginger
| 9 | 9 | "Summer School" | Sean McNamara | Devin Bunje & Nick Stanton | August 10, 2009 | 106 | 0.4 |
Zeke must sit through summer school with his algebra teacher, who does not like Zeke. He later learns that he was once an avid skateboarder and challenges him to a skateboarding competition to get out of taking classes for the rest of the summer. Meanwhile, Stinky Cast tries his best to impress Ginger, but ends up humiliating her instead. Guest stars: Damon Jones as Mr. Rucker, Andy Pessoa as Stinky Cast
| 10 | 10 | "Haunted Board" | Savage Steve Holland | Boyd Hale | October 5, 2009 | 111 | N/A |
Zeke and Luther are haunted when a cool looking board they bought off the internet turns out to be the legendary cursed "Eye of the Cat", which appears to be possessed and have a mind of its own. Every boarder who has ever ridden it has experienced an unfortunate accident, with one guy being instantly vaporized into a cloud of smoke. In the meantime, Stinky Cast strikes a deal with Ginger in which he bets that he can truly frighten her. Guest stars: David Ury as Don, Andy Pessoa as Stinky Cast, John Fleck as Gravedigger, Adam Chambers as Wheelz
| 11 | 11 | "Road Trip" | Sean McNamara | Tom Burkhard | October 19, 2009 | 103 | N/A |
Zeke and Luther's favorite skate boarder of all time is Tony Hawk, and they find themselves on a trip to his childhood home. They return home with an unlikely souvenir, a pair of Tony's boxers. The two boys fight over who gets to keep the boxers. Meanwhile, Ginger and her best friend Poochie McGruder (who is introduced in this episode) plan the ultimate prank on Zeke. Guest stars: John Farley as Lenny, Lily Jackson as Poochie
| 12 | 12 | "Luther Leads" | Sean McNamara | Bernie Ancheta | October 26, 2009 | 107 | 3.0 |
Zeke and Luther celebrate their tenth anniversary of skateboarding together and find a security video from Donut Don that shows Luther was the first to ride a skateboard that the two of them found ten years ago, contradicting their memory of Zeke being the first. After seeing the video, Luther becomes confident and believes that he should lead the skateboarding routes, but his clumsiness leads Zeke into falling into the ocean and subsequently being detained by a lifeguard. Meanwhile, Ginger wins a contest at Don's Donuts that promises her to own the establishment when Don retires. Guest stars: Bob Koherr as Rex, David Ury as Don
| 13 | 13 | "Soul Bucket" | Roger Nygard | Bernie Ancheta & Jason Jordan | November 2, 2009 | 113 | N/A |
During one of Luther's frequent visits to his grandmother Nana's retirement home, she requests that his rock band, Soul Bucket, perform for her. Luther is in a dilemma due to fact that he made up stories about the so-called rock band because her life was boring. Luther along with Zeke quickly come up with a plan to convince her that the band is genuine. After a disastrous lip-syncing performance at the retirement home, it is up to Zeke to convince her that she is not too old to have fun. Meanwhile, Ginger holds open auditions for a new best friend to replace Poochie. Guest stars: Marianne Muellerleile as Nana, John Schuck as Carl, Lily Jackson as Poochie, Sam Looc as Manny Absent: Daniel Curtis Lee as Kojo
| 14 | 14 | "Not My Sister's Keeper" | Joe Menendez | Matt Dearborn | November 9, 2009 | 114 | N/A |
A contest is held at Don's Donuts in which participants must keep their hand on a rare skateboard, which will be awarded to the last person with their hand on it. Zeke plans to enter the contest with Luther, but Zeke's parents go out of town, requiring him to watch after Ginger. Zeke enters the contest anyway, believing that Ginger will be okay and stay out of trouble. When Zeke learns that Ginger is missing from the house, he reluctantly exits the contest, leaving Kojo as the winner. On their way to find Ginger, Zeke and Luther encounter the Plunk brothers, who enjoy giving children unwanted haircuts. The Plunks, who have their own little sister, decide to let Zeke and Luther go when they learn that Ginger is missing. Zeke and Luther discover that Ginger was at Poochie's house. Guest stars: Brad Raider as Diamond Jim Dantley, David Ury as Don, Nate Hartley as Ozzie, Lily Jackson as Poochie, Chris Zylka as Doyce Plunk, Reid Ewing as Charlie Plunk
| 15 | 15 | "Rollerdorks" | Joe Menendez | Tom Burkhard | November 16, 2009 | 115 | N/A |
A feud breaks out between the skaters and a gang of disco dancing roller bladers known as the "Rollerdorks" when they show up and try to take over "Ramps", the skaters' favorite hangout spot, located behind several businesses. This ends up in an all out waffle fight. Things only get worse when Luther begins dating one of the dorks, Charlene. Zeke and the others force Luther to break up with Charlene. It all ends with a race between Zeke and Rollerdorks leader Ramone, the winner getting Ramps. Zeke wins, but when he sees Luther and Charlene say goodbye, he changes his mind and suggests that they all share Ramps, Meanwhile, when Ginger learns that Poochie's bird only defecates on bullseye targets, she plans to use the bird in a revenge plot against Zeke by putting a target on his skate helmet. Guest stars: Nate Hartley as Ozzie, Lily Jackson as Poochie, Brianna McCracken as Charlene, Hector Bucio as Ramone
| 16 | 16 | "Crash Dummies" | Gregory Hobson | Bernie Ancheta & Jason Jordan | November 23, 2009 | 116 | N/A |
Zeke and Luther send a video to a television show that features stunts performed on skateboards. They are picked to join the show, and end up tied with Goose, a rival skater on the show. They later come up with another stunt in which they skate off a ramp while their pants are filled with helium, making them float through the sky. Zeke and Luther win a self-serve ice cream machine for their video. Meanwhile, Ginger plans her own "surprise" birthday party. At the event, she wears high heels to impress Hart Hamlin, a boy who likes only girls who are taller than him. Guest stars: Ron Fassler as Dale Davis, Andy Pessoa as Stinky Cast, Lily Jackson as Poochie, Jareb Dauplaise as The Goose; Absent: Daniel Curtis Lee as Kojo Uncredited: Leo Howard as Hart Hamlin
| 17 | 17 | "Adventure Boy" | Gregory Hobson | Boyd Hale | November 30, 2009 | 117 | 0.2 |
Zeke hopes to win Olivia over before she falls for Rutger Murdock, the handsome host of a television show titled Adventure Boy, in which he travels around the world. Zeke eventually exposes Rutger as a fake who does not actually travel around the world. Meanwhile, Luther takes care of a dog named Rufus that causes trouble, unaware that the list that he used to take of the dog is actually for his elderly owner named Bernie, with Luther thinking that the dog's name is Bernie. Guest stars: Juliet Holland-Rose as Olivia, David Ury as Don, Scott Beehner as Deputy Dingle, Austin Butler as Rutger Dundee Absent: Ryan Newman as Ginger
| 18 | 18 | "I, Skatebot" | Savage Steve Holland | Devin Bunje & Nick Stanton | January 4, 2010 | 118 | N/A |
Mr. Fitzle, the owner of a store near Ramps, does not like the presence of skateboarders behind the store. He eventually calls the police on the skaters, after making repeated threats in the past to do so. Officer Dingle declares that the skaters may continue skateboarding because Ramps is public property. Fitzle then creates a robot to scare away the skateboarders, but it eventually disobeys and attacks Fitzle. Zeke and Luther later destroy the robot by wedging a soda can between a pair of mini doors on its front, causing it to explode. Fitzle decides that the skateboarders are not so bad and that they can continue skateboarding at Ramps. 'Guest stars: Curtis Armstrong as Clarence Fitzle, Nate Hartley as Ozzie, Scott Beehner as Deputy Dingle, David Gore as Kirby Cheddar Absent: Ryan Newman as Ginger
| 19 | 19 | "Law and Boarder" | Matt Dearborn | Danny Warren | January 18, 2010 | 119 | N/A |
Ginger opens a potato wedge stand business in front of her house, but it is disrupted when Zeke and Luther crash into a customer with their skateboards. Ginger gets revenge by having the neighborhood association implement strict skateboarding rules. Zeke and Luther get revenge by having food stands banned in the neighborhood. Jumpsuit Johnson, the leader of the neighborhood association, then starts implementing bans on various things in the neighborhood, which upsets the children. Zeke and Ginger agree to work together to create a plan that will end the bans. Zeke sneaks into Johnson's house and replaces his jumpsuit with a pair of saggy pants, which were banned by him. The children place a flier at Johnson's house advertising a jumpsuit sale, and they alter his car so it will not start. A skateboard is pushed towards his house, which entices him to use it to get to the advertised sale. Officer Dingle arrests Johnson for wearing saggy pants and skateboarding. Johnson then ends all the neighborhood bans and skateboarding rules. Guest stars: Lawrence A. Mandley as Jumpsuit Johnson, Scott Beehner as Deputy Dingle, Rick Dano as Bus Driver, David Gore as Kirby Cheddar
| 20 | 20 | "A Very Hairy Problem" | Savage Steve Holland | Steven Judd | January 25, 2010 | 120 | 0.6 |
Zeke and Luther audition for roles in a new film starring Sammy, a movie gorilla who has appeared in multiple films. Zeke gets a part as Sammy's stunt double, and Luther sneaks into Sammy's set trailer to meet him. Sammy follows Luther home from the set, and Luther later concludes that Sammy wants to return to Ape Mountain Reserve where he was raised, based on drawings that the gorilla keeps making. Zeke reluctantly agrees to help Luther get Sammy to the reserve. Luther's grandmother drives them, but Officer Dingle locates them and attempts to retrieve Sammy. Zeke distracts Dingle by disguising himself as Sammy, while the others flee to the reserve. Luther discovers that Sammy actually just wanted a hamburger. Guest stars: Marianne Muellerleile as Nana, Scott Beehner as Deputy Dingle, Amir Talai as Dex Bratner
| 21 | 21 | "Skate Squad" | Matt Dearborn | Matt Dearborn & Tom Burkhard | February 1, 2010 | 121 | N/A |
Zeke and Luther are tired of their school P.E. class, which consists of violent dodgeball games. Along with Kojo and Ozzie, they decide to form a school varsity skateboarding team, which will exempt them from gym classes. Miss Aldretti, the vice principal at Buzz Johnson High School, approves their school skate team, named the Woodpeckers. Zeke, the team coach, is surprised to learn that his team receives a $400 check, which is given to every new school team as start-up money. The team spends the money on new clothing and food. Later, Aldretti informs Zeke that Yuba Tech has its own school skateboarding team, the Yuba Tech Honkers, which wants to challenge his team to a relay skate race. When Zeke questions whether his team is capable of winning a race, Aldretti tells him that declining to race will require that he repay the $400 check, which has already been spent. Zeke agrees to the race, and makes Luther the anchor skater for the competition, which puts pressure on Luther to succeed. Zeke is surprised at how well Ozzie skates, until discovering that he has been cheating with the use of solar panels attached to his board. Not being allowed to cheat, Ozzie loses the desire to race. Kojo wants to quit the race when cheerleader Monica Lopez ends their relationship, as she considers him too needy. Zeke apologizes for putting pressure on Luther, and convinces Kojo and Ozzie to race. The Woodpeckers ultimately win the race. Guest stars: Nate Hartley as Ozzie, Paula Sorge as Miss Aldretti, Tristan Mays as Monica Lopez

=== Season 2 (2010) ===
| No. overall | No. in season | Title | Directed by | Written by | Original release date | Prod. code | US viewers (millions) |
|---|---|---|---|---|---|---|---|
| 22 | 1 | "Zeke Jumps the Shark" | Eyal Gordin | Tom Burkhard | March 15, 2010 | 201 | 0.8 |
Zeke and Luther survive a shark attack while fishing for shrimp in Gilroy Bay one night. The next morning, they learn that the shark was captured after it attacked neighborhood boy Kirby Cheddar. News reporter Dale Davis is covering the story at the hospital, where Zeke and Luther go to visit Kirby. After their visit, Dale asks during a live newscast if Kirby had anything to say; Luther tells him that Kirby said, "Jump the shark," leading Dale to believe that Kirby wanted one of them to skateboard over the captive shark. Zeke reluctantly agrees to perform the stunt. The shark is held in a 25-foot outdoor tank at a rescue center for marine animals. During another hospital visit, Kirby tells Luther that he actually said, "Bump the cart," in reference to Luther almost bumping into Kirby's food cart. Despite the mix-up, Zeke remains committed to the stunt, believing that it could be his defining moment. Although Zeke becomes nervous and uncoordinated, he manages to complete the stunt. Meanwhile, Ginger is upset at Zeke for not cleaning up after himself in their bathroom, but becomes happy when she learns that Zeke will be performing such a dangerous stunt. She hires a boy named Monty Wiggin, who she trains to be her perfect replacement brother, believing that Zeke will not survive his stunt. However, she is disappointed when she insults Monty and he does not do the same to her. She realizes Monty is too nice and fires him in favor of her real brother. Guest stars: Ron Fassler as Dale Davis, Aloma Wright as Nurse, David Gore as Kirby Cheddar, Austin Wells as Monty
| 23 | 2 | "Tall Stack of Waffles" | Joe Menendez | Matt Dearborn & Tom Burkhard | March 22, 2010 | 204 | N/A |
During a medical examination, Dr. Chili Ricardo determines that Luther will grow to be seven feet tall, based on his current height and family history. Luther realizes that there are no seven-foot-tall professional skateboarders, and when he begins believing that his eventual height will make it difficult to skateboard, he decides to retire and find a new hobby. Zeke locates a man named Ken Tuckie, the world's fattest Motocross rider, who overcame a teenage addiction to cream puffs and became a skilled rider. To inspire confidence in Luther, Zeke has Ken demonstrate a stunt in which he rides his motorcycle off a ramp and through the fiery ring of doom. The stunt does not go as planned, as the ramp collapses while Ken is riding over it. Luther decides to try the stunt on his skateboard and is successful, convincing him to stick with skateboarding. Dr. Ricardo later informs Luther that he made a mistake and Luther will only grow to a normal height. Guest stars: Carlos Lacamara as Dr. Ricardo, David Gore as Kirby Cheddar, James Price as Ken Tuckie
| 24 | 3 | "Airheads" | Gregory Hobson | David Regal | March 29, 2010 | 205 | 0.3 |
Zeke and Luther, having difficulty maintaining their focus while skateboarding, take advice from Tony Hawk's biography, which states that skateboarders should take an occasional break from skating in order to be good at it. They decide to start an air rock band with Kojo and Ozzie, but Zeke believes that Luther has taken the idea too far when he gets the band a gig at the Yolo County fair. Luther kicks Zeke out of the band for calling it stupid, and then replaces Zeke with Kirby Cheddar. Kojo and Ozzie quit the band just before the performance because Luther becomes controlling. Luther demands that Kirby take over for Kojo and Ozzie, but Kirby is scared by Luther and quits because Luther reminds him of a monster. With the band broken up, Luther attempts to entertain the crowd with a sock puppet, but he is unsuccessful. Zeke, who initially believed that revenge would be nice, decides to join Luther on-stage for an air band performance. Kojo and Ozzie also decide to rejoin the band during the performance, which receives positive feedback from the crowd. Afterwards, Zeke and Luther notice a significant improvement in their skateboarding skills. Meanwhile, with help from Poochie, Ginger plans to win every ribbon at the county fair, after nearly doing so the previous year with the exception of losing the pie competition. After Ginger rejects Poochie's suggestion to add nutmeg to her pie, Poochie decides to enter her own pie in the county fair against Ginger's. They sabotage each other's pies, but Ginger realizes that Poochie's pie tastes good, and the two decide to team up for next year's competition. Guest stars: Nate Hartley as Ozzie, David Gore as Kirby Cheddar, Lily Jackson as Poochie
| 25 | 4 | "Luther Unleashed" | Eyal Gordin | Matt Dearborn | April 5, 2010 | 202 | N/A |
Luther becomes frustrated with Ozzie "posing" as a skater and wants him to stop once and for all. So Zeke encourages Ozzie to try skate photography. When the photos are taken, Ozzie purposely photoshops his head onto Luther's body when he performs a great skateboarding move. Luther becomes upset by this and challenges Ozzie to a mixed martial arts match, not realizing that Ozzie only did that to impress his older and more talented brother, brigadier general Hootie Kephart, who attends a military school. Meanwhile, Zeke and Ginger pull bathroom pranks on each other and Kojo tries to impress his girlfriend, Monica, with his singing. Guest stars: Nate Hartley as Ozzie, Tristin Mays as Monica Lopez, H Michael Croner as Hootie
| 26 | 5 | "Old Nasty" | Savage Steve Holland | Bernie Ancheta | April 12, 2010 | 207 | N/A |
Zeke is astonished when Ginger takes up interest in skateboarding after Luther secretly gives her lessons in exchange for helping him fill out a video game rental form. Zeke later finds out that the only reason why Ginger is interested in the sport is because of her having a crush on Deuce, the new skateboarding boy in town. Ginger becomes depressed when she thinks Deuce might not be interested in her. Although Zeke and Ginger do not get along, he decides to help her by inviting Deuce to a party where they can socialize. Ginger, who is willing to do anything to impress Deuce, later decides to skateboard on "Old Nasty", a dangerous skating contraption Zeke and Luther helped build at "Ramps". Deuce is injured when Old Nasty collapses and crushes him, after which he is placed into a full-body cast. Ginger ends their new relationship because she does not want to take care of Deuce while he recovers. Guest stars: Ryan Ochoa as Deuce, Tommy Hinkley as Agent Absent: Daniel Curtis Lee as Kojo
| 27 | 6 | "Double Crush" | Savage Steve Holland | Matt Dearborn | May 3, 2010 | 208 | N/A |
Zeke and Luther realize that professional skaters have girlfriends, so they decide to go on dates with two girls recommended by Kojo. Zeke goes on a date with Allie, who has a high-pitched laugh that annoys him, while Luther dates a girl named Lorna, who has a long facial hair that disgusts him. Neither of the boys' dates end well, but the next day, they meet a BMX biker girl named Dani and become instantly attracted to her. Kojo offers to play matchmaker and oversee a series of dates with them to determine which skater boy Dani likes best. Guest stars: Danielle Campbell as Dani, Kelly Heyer as Lorna, Chelsea Tavares as Bonita; Co-star: Bayley Jane Corman as Allie Absent: Ryan Newman as Ginger
| 28 | 7 | "Plunk Hunting" | Joe Menendez | Tom Burkhard | May 10, 2010 | 203 | N/A |
Doyce and Charlie Plunk steal Nana Waffles' wig, and Zeke, Luther and Kojo try to retrieve it from them. After the Plunk brothers are found, they retreat on their skateboards, and Zeke, Luther and Kojo chase after them on their own skateboards. The chase leads them through an abandoned store, where Luther slips on scattered bolts; one of them is injected into his rear end. Luther visits Dr. Ricardo to have the bolt removed, but he decides against the removal after realizing it is too painful. Zeke searches the Internet hoping to find the Plunks' weakness, and he learns that they are afraid of doctors. Zeke and Luther dress up as doctors in an attempt to get the wig back, but the Plunks eventually realize who they are. Zeke then decides to remove the bolt, causing Luther to experience excruciating pain that sends him into a rage. The Plunks, terrified by Luther, return the wig. Guest stars: Marianne Muellerleile as Nana, Carlos Lacamara as Dr. Ricardo, Reid Ewing as Charlie Plunk, Chris Zylka as Doyce Plunk
| 29 | 8 | "Kojo's BFF" | Eyal Gordin | Jason Jordan | May 17, 2010 | 209 | N/A |
For an upcoming team skateboarding contest, Kojo offers to let Zeke join his team, but Zeke has already partnered with Luther. Instead, Kojo teams up with his old friend, Tiki Delgado, who is a famous professional skater. Meanwhile, Luther gets a psychic reading from a man named Swami Steve, who operates his business from within a van. After Steve tells Luther to beware of a banana, Luther begins seeing a man dressed in a large banana costume. Luther is paranoid that he is being stalked by the banana, which disappears whenever he tries to show it to Zeke. Luther and Zeke learn that Kojo has faked his relationship with Tiki, who is being paid to be friends with him and compete in the contest. Kojo eventually admits the truth to Zeke and Luther, and reveals that Tiki is a jerk. During the contest, Luther encounters the banana again and discovers it is actually Steve in disguise. Steve wanted Luther's future to come true, hoping that Luther would then tell his friends about Steve's business. Tiki glues Zeke's buttocks to a chair in the audience, in an attempt to keep him from skating. When it is Zeke's turn to skate, he removes his pants and skates while wearing makeshift pants made of cotton candy. Zeke and Luther win the contest with the highest score, and they share their award with Kojo. Guest stars: Diego Boneta as Tiki Delgado, Brad Carter as Steve Absent: Ryan Newman as Ginger
| 30 | 9 | "One Strange Night" | Eyal Gordin | Devin Bunje & Nick Stanton | May 24, 2010 | 210 | N/A |
Zeke and Luther borrow a snow cone machine from Kirby Cheddar for an all-night party celebrating Tony Hawk's half birthday. Zeke decides to invite Kirby because he has never been invited to a sleepover. Kirby's mother, Mrs. Cheddar, is strict and overprotective, but she allows him to attend the sleepover party. For the snow cone machine, Kojo brings 10-year expired snow cone syrup, but the side effects include erratic behavior and short-term memory loss. After a wild night of partying, the boys wake up the next morning unaware of Kirby's whereabouts and with no memory of what happened the previous night. Zeke, Luther, and Kojo search throughout the city for Kirby, whose mother will be picking him up later for his solo trombone recital. Hoping to learn clues about Kirby's possible location, they meet with various individuals, including Jumpsuit Johnson, Lisa Grubner, and pawn shop owner Sleazy Steve. They eventually learn that they went to a bus station the previous night to skateboard, so they go there to search for Kirby. The boys only manage to find Kirby's trombone, which is crushed by a bus. After a long search, Zeke and Luther realize that Kirby was playing hide and seek, and that he has been hiding in Zeke's closet all night. Zeke then returns to Steve's shop and exchanges his skateboard for a trombone for Kirby, who arrives on time for his recital. Guest stars: Lawrence A. Mandley as Jumpsuit Johnson, David Gore as Kirby Cheddar, Abigail Mavity as Lisa Grubner, Brad Carter as Steve, Anoush NeVart as Mrs. Cheddar
| 31–32 | 10–11 | "Luther Waffles and the Skateboard of Doom" | Roger Nygard | Tom Burkhard & Matt Dearborn | June 21, 2010 | 211–212 | 0.7 |
Zeke and Luther get summer jobs plucking chickens on Ken Tuckie's farm, so Luther can pay to help rebuild Nana and Carl's summer cabin, which he accidentally blew up while making pancakes. The boys are fired because of their inadequate work and then apply for jobs as skateboard testers for Garoosh Industries, a manufacturer of skateboard gear. Company owner Garm Garoosh is an ex-professional skater whose career ended when he fell during a skate trick on a loop ramp at the X Games, where Zeke and Luther had front-row seats to the incident. Garm hires the boys, but they need to get to the company's headquarters in Hidden Palms, California. They decide to use Ginger's car, which she won in a Junior Scout contest. Ginger accompanies the boys so she can propose a business venture to Garm for her Wedge-O-Matic potato wedge maker. Meanwhile, Nana and Carl are staying in Luther's room and decide to throw a party, but Nana wrecks the room while trying to smash a piñata. Ginger and the boys get lost after taking a shortcut and wind up at Area 57, a location where aliens are rumored to be held. They encounter aliens who turn out to be people in costumes, led by Ozzie as the alien leader, as part of a game. In exchange for directions, Luther agrees to lend Ozzie his World of Battlecraft virtual reality video game. Ozzie goes to Luther's house to retrieve the game, and he, Nana and Carl decide to play the game together, but they wind up further wrecking his room with their game swords. Ginger and the boys arrive at Garoosh Industries, where Zeke and Luther are to test a computerized skateboard for Garm. Meanwhile, through a live broadcast, Ginger markets the Wedge-O-Matic with Neils, the eccentric head of the company's home shopping division. However, his erratic behavior results in no sales. Zeke learns that Garm wishes to kill Luther, who was responsible for his X Games failure by taking a picture, with the camera flash blinding Garm. Zeke is apprehended after learning of Garm's revenge plan, but he escapes with Kojo's help. Luther, unaware of Garm's plot, is testing the new skateboard, not realizing that it is rigged to explode. Zeke, Ginger, and Kojo catch up to Luther in the car and help him remove his shoes, which are magnetically locked to the skateboard. Garm is arrested and his company is shut down, but the boys still receive payment to rebuild the cabin and Luther's room. Guest stars: French Stewart as Garm Garoosh, Marianne Muellerleile as Nana, Nate Hartley as Ozzie, John Schuck as Carl, Mark Teich as Neils, James Price as Ken Tuckie
| 33 | 12 | "Crouching Zeke, Dancing Luther" | Savage Steve Holland | Jason Jordan | June 28, 2010 | 213 | N/A |
Zeke has a dream where he manages a nearly impossible skateboard trick that he has named the Frozen Freaky, in which he balances atop his board while it stands vertically. Also in the dream is an Asian man who in reality is his mailman and a karate master named Mr. Ng. Hoping to achieve the Frozen Freaky, Zeke asks Ng for help, and he agrees. After various teachings, Zeke attempts and fails the Frozen Freaky. Ng then tells Zeke that he must find a magical mountain quail egg that will help him achieve the trick. Zeke, with help from Ozzie, climbs Mount Gilroy in search of the egg. After finding it, Zeke successfully achieves the Frozen Freaky. Ng then uses the egg to make an omelet, and tells Zeke that the egg had no powers and that he only needed to believe in himself. Meanwhile, Luther's mother has signed him up for dance classes, and he winds up with Lisa Grubner as his partner. Lisa promises to help Luther pass the class if he gives Zeke a scrapbook that she made with pictures of Zeke. Luther declines to give Zeke the scrapbook, and Lisa becomes a difficult dance partner in retaliation. Miss Cordova, the dance instructor, passes Luther and gives him his certificate to avoid having to teach him any further, as he is not a good dancer. Guest stars: Keone Young as Mr. Ng, Nate Hartley as Ozzie, Abigail Mavity as Lisa Grubner, Patricia Rae as Miss Cordova Absent: Ryan Newman as Ginger
| 34 | 13 | "Luther Waffles: Skate Cop" | Savage Steve Holland | Bernie Ancheta | July 5, 2010 | 214 | N/A |
Zeke and Luther pose as construction workers and trick a cement truck driver into filling a hole at Ramps, but they are busted by Deputy Dingle, who forces the boys to participate in a police ride-along program to see how difficult it is being a police officer. At one point, Zeke and Luther visit the house of Dingle's mother, where he lives along with his cat. Zeke takes note of Dingle's swimming pool and imagines it being drained so he can skateboard in it, an idea that he mentions to Luther. After having fun accompanying Dingle, Luther decides to become a junior deputy. When Dingle's pool is drained, he tasks Luther with finding the culprit. Luther finds Zeke's skate key near the pool drain valve, but Zeke says he is innocent and that he must have dropped the key there on the previous day. It is discovered that Dingle's mother drained the pool after throwing a shoe at his cat to quiet it down, with the shoe hitting the drain valve. Meanwhile, Ginger is on a date with Hart Hamlin and is about to have her first kiss, but Stinky Cast intervenes and is kissed by Ginger instead, which disgusts her. Afterward, Stinky Cast tells students at school that he and Ginger are together, but he agrees to stop after Ginger proposes kissing him one more time. Guest stars: Scott Beehner as Deputy Dingle, Andy Pessoa as Stinky Cast, Lily Jackson as Poochie, Leo Howard as Hart Hamlin, Gil Glasgow as Driver; Co-star: Marcia Ann Burrs as Dingle's Mom Absent: Daniel Curtis Lee as Kojo
| 35 | 14 | "Treasure" | Rick Weis | Tom Burkhard | July 12, 2010 | 217 | N/A |
Luther realizes that he has an unpaid bill of more than $300 owed to Don's Donuts, so he and Zeke decide to work for Don to pay it off. While dumping a drum of old grease, the boys discover a satchel on the drum's bottom containing a metal handle and a key. Also found is a 1959 boat ticket addressed to D.B. Foxwell, a banjo player who robbed a Gilroy bank of $20,000 and then disappeared along with the money, which the boys now intend to find. Their search for the money leads them to the pier, where they use the key to open a locker containing pairs of underpants, each one marked with a letter. Zeke realizes that the letters spell "John", leading him to speculate that the money is hidden in a bathroom. Accompanied by Luther's newly hired butler, Snotsworth, the boys check the bathroom at Don's Donuts and attach the metal handle to a broken toilet, opening a hidden passageway leading to a treasure chest. Ginger and Kojo simultaneously find the chest, and the four work together to open it by playing several banjo strings which unlock it. Don then takes the money for himself, resulting in a chase across the city that ends with everyone fighting over the money. Zeke then suggests that they donate the money to charity, to which everyone agrees. Guest stars: David Ury as Don, Ted Rooney as Snotsworth
| 36 | 15 | "Rocket Men" | Gregory Hobson | Devin Bunje & Nick Stanton | July 19, 2010 | 216 | N/A |
Zeke and Luther, hoping to be featured in a skateboarding magazine, attempt a trick involving a board with an attached high-powered fan, on which the boys spent all their money. When the fan is damaged, the boys work for Jumpsuit Johnson to raise money. Later, they learn that Jumpsuit keeps a rocket in his garage. They sneak into the garage to take the rocket so they can build a rocket board out of it for their skateboard trick. Jumpsuit catches the boys in his garage, and agrees to teach them how to use the rocket after they convince him that it should be used in some way. The boys learn that Jumpsuit is frequently mocked by two former astronauts who traveled to the moon, while he did not get to go because he was late after they gave him the wrong launch time. The boys add a bicycle seat to their rocket board so Jumpsuit can join them during their stunt, which the trio perform successfully. Meanwhile, Ozzie is upset at Ginger for selling him fake dinosaur eggs during her yard sale, so she sells him a top hat instead, telling him that it makes him look like a millionaire. Although the price tag says the hat is $5, Ginger says that is an error and charges Ozzie $50. Afterward, she is visited by local historian William Cadbury, who wants to pay thousands of dollars for the hat because he believes it is Abraham Lincoln's missing hat. Ginger pays Ozzie all of her yard sale money to get the hat back, but Cadbury reveals he is actually Ozzie's brother, Hootie, and that the hat is worthless. The Kepharts reveal that this was their revenge against her for scamming Ozzie. Guest stars: Lawrence A. Mandley as Jumpsuit Johnson, Nate Hartley as Ozzie, H Michael Croner as Hootie/Antique Collector, Chris Ellis as Buzz Absent: Daniel Curtis Lee as Kojo
| 37 | 16 | "Board in Class" | Gregory Hobson | David Regal | July 26, 2010 | 215 | N/A |
Nana Waffles is packing for a vacation aboard a cruise ship, and Zeke and Luther make Carl worried that she may meet another man on the ship. The boys convince Carl to propose marriage to Nana, but in response, she cheerfully tells Carl to not be ridiculous. Nana leaves for her vacation, and Carl becomes depressed, believing that Nana has rejected him. Carl is the boys' woodworking class teacher, and he threatens to give them a bad grade for suggesting the failed marriage proposal. Zeke and Luther decide to complete and varnish Carl's wooden longcase clock, which he planned to give to Nana upon its completion. The boys only anger Carl further when Luther puts the clock through a woodchipper, believing it is a varnish drier. The boys then construct a giant skateboard as a last attempt to get a good grade, but Carl gives them an "F" because the skateboard is unusable due to its size. When Carl hurts his back, the boys use the skateboard to transport him to a hospital, after which he decides to give the boys an "A-plus." When Nana returns, Carl asks why she turned down his proposal, and she reminds him that they already got married 10 years ago at a drive-through wedding chapel in Las Vegas. Meanwhile, Ginger and Poochie discover that a cereal brand is falsely advertising dolphin-shaped pieces in every bite, while each box actually contains only nine dolphin pieces. Ginger aggressively complains to the cereal company, which eventually names a cereal after her: Ginger O's. Guest stars: Marianne Muellerleile as Nana, John Schuck as Carl, Lily Jackson as Poochie, Henry Dittman as Sumner Hathaway Absent: Daniel Curtis Lee as Kojo
| 38 | 17 | "Local Heroes" | Millicent Shelton | David Regal | August 9, 2010 | 220 | N/A |
To pay for skateboarding gear, Zeke and Luther get jobs at a video game retail store, where they work as temporary sales associates to their boss, Brad. Zeke and Luther work late one night while Brad goes home. A man enters the store as a customer with his dog, and Zeke and Luther mistakenly believe that he is robbing the store after they overhear him telling the dog to behave. Zeke and Luther, unaware of the dog's presence, insist that the man take $600 worth of video game merchandise. After learning from security footage that the man had been talking to his dog, Brad demotes Zeke and Luther to junior temporary sales associates for giving away free merchandise. The boys become the laughing stock of Gilroy. To end their humiliation, Zeke and Luther arrange for Ozzie to pose as a robber, allowing them to scare him off so they can be hailed as heroes. A real robber arrives at the store and is initially mistaken for Ozzie, until Ozzie actually arrives as the fake robber. Zeke and Luther then apprehend the real robber after chasing him on their skateboards. Meanwhile, to complete her collection of limited-edition stuffed animals, Ginger becomes obsessed with winning a stuffed beaver toy from a claw machine at Don's Donuts. Guest stars: Nate Hartley as Ozzie, Dustin Ingram as Brad, George Ketsios as Ski-mask Man, Camila Banus as Big Sister, Charles Halford as Man
| 39 | 18 | "Super Shredder" | John Putch | Story by : David Rothenberg; Teleplay by : David Regal | August 16, 2010 | 222 | N/A |
Zeke and Luther meet Mitch, a man who had to give up skateboarding for his job, which he dislikes. They convince Mitch to quit his job so he can skateboard again. Meanwhile, a professional wrestling match between Death Ripper and heel wrestler Raw Dog is being held in Gilroy. Zeke and Luther are disappointed to learn that Death Ripper, their favorite wrestler, has suddenly quit. When the boys discover that Mitch has Death Ripper's wrestling costume, they are surprised to learn that he actually is the wrestler. After confronting a possum that has been stealing his stuff, Luther experiences newfound confidence that inspires him to fill in for Mitch as Death Ripper. Meanwhile, Ginger becomes Raw Dog's manager and attempts to make him more dog-like so he can live up to his name. She teaches him to bark instead of roar and later has him on a leash prior to the wrestling match. When Zeke learns that Luther is taking over as Death Ripper, he tries to talk Mitch into returning to his old job, to which Mitch eventually agrees. After Luther gets beaten by Raw Dog, Mitch enters the ring under the new wrestling name of Super Shredder and beats his opponent. Meanwhile, Kojo scalps tickets to the match. Guest stars: Regan Burns as Mitch, Stacey Hinnen as Raw Dog, Peter Hulne as Dave Prescott, Rey Mysterio as himself
| 40 | 19 | "Little Bro, Big Trouble" | Millicent Shelton | Tom Burkhard | August 23, 2010 | 219 | N/A |
Luther and his young brother Roy never spend time together, so their parents contact Hootie through the Big Brother Association to have him be a role model for Roy. Luther decides that he should be the one to spend time with his own brother, after Zeke convinces Luther that Roy could turn out to be as weird as Hootie if they spend time together. Roy rarely leaves his bedroom and spends nearly all his time playing video games. After managing to get Roy out of his room, Zeke and Luther attempt several activities with him, none of which impress him. Meanwhile, Don is preparing a large order of pastry items for the U.S. president, who is in Gilroy for a luncheon. Roy becomes increasingly interested in the Plunk brothers and the three of them eventually form a friendship, despite Luther's warnings about the Plunks' bad behavior. Zeke and Luther learn that Roy and the Plunks are plotting to steal the pastry items before they arrive at the president's luncheon. Zeke and Luther foil the Plunks' plot and prevent Roy from being caught. Meanwhile, Zeke makes an effort to be a nice sibling to Ginger, but she is only annoyed by his attempts, which include an unwanted meat bouquet, and leaving gummy candies on her pillow which end up getting stuck in her hair. Guest stars: David Ury as Don, Reid Ewing as Charlie Plunk, Chris Zylka as Doyce Plunk, H Michael Croner as Hootie, Davis Cleveland as Redd Waffles Absent: Daniel Curtis Lee as Kojo
| 41 | 20 | "Robo-Luth" | John Putch | Devin Bunje & Nick Stanton | October 18, 2010 | 221 | N/A |
Luther attempts to break a local skateboarding record by skating off a ramp and over a row of 13 water jugs, but he fails the stunt and injures his knee. Zeke and Luther visit Dr. Blitz, who performs an experimental knee surgery that has only a minor recovery period. After Luther has recovered, he discovers that his new knee is capable of great strength, which allows him to break the water jug record. Dr. Blitz tells Luther that he implanted his knee with experimental robotic micro hydraulics, resulting in his new strength. A sinkhole, approximately 30 feet long, opens in Gilroy, which commonly gets sinkholes. Luther decides he will skate off a ramp and cross over the sinkhole. When Zeke discourages Luther from performing the stunt, Luther believes that Zeke is worried about losing his own sinkhole skating record. After successfully skating over the sinkhole, Luther's knee malfunctions and he inadvertently kicks Zeke into the sinkhole. Zeke hangs on to a pipe in the sinkhole, while Luther lowers his leg for Zeke to grab onto, thereby harming the knee and going against Blitz's advice to save it. Meanwhile, Zeke has told Ginger that he recently let out a large sneeze in her room, but he declines to specify what he sneezed on, leading her into a frenzy to clean her entire room. Ultimately, Ginger disposes of nearly everything in her room, at which point Zeke says that he sneezed on the gloves that she had used to clean the room. Guest stars: Daniel Riordan as Dr. Blitz, David Gore as Kirby Cheddar
| 42 | 21 | "The Bro List" | Matt Dearborn | Jessica Glassberg | October 25, 2010 | 225 | N/A |
Luther tells Zeke that his turtle, Terrence, has died. Luther, realizing how short life can be, insists to Zeke that they complete the "Bro List", a list of 10 things they agreed to do together at some point in their lifetime. Their list includes eating a giant donut at Don's Donuts, pranking Ginger, and helping Luther get a kiss from student Holly Hendricks. When Luther becomes oddly insistent on completing the Bro List as soon as possible, Zeke becomes suspicious and sneaks into Luther's room to investigate. When Zeke discovers that Terrence is actually still alive, Luther reveals that he lied and used the death as an excuse to complete the Bro List before his family moves to Topeka, Kansas the next day. Wishing to make their final day together a memorable one, they visit Gilroy Swamp hoping to encounter Tony Hawk, who they learned would be fishing at an unspecified location. The boys spend the night in the wilderness while avoiding the Psycho Scout, who, according to legend, is a Junior Scout who roams the swamp after having his face fall off as the result of coming into contact with poison ivy. The boys learn that the Psycho Scout who had been terrorizing them was actually Ginger in disguise. The next day, the boys encounter Tony Hawk at Don's Donuts, and the three spend several hours together. After the boys say goodbye to each other, Luther learns he is actually moving to Topeka Road, which is one street away from his old house. Special guest star: Tony Hawk as himself Guest star: Chelsea Ricketts as Holly Hendricks
| 43 | 22 | "Seoul Bros" | Gregory Hobson | Devin Bunje & Nick Stanton | November 1, 2010 | 206 | N/A |
Zeke and Luther encounter Max Randall, who is a manager of the world's top skateboarders, but he declines to consider managing the two boys. Zeke and Luther learn that Max will be attending a party, so they compile their greatest skateboarding tricks onto a DVD and sneak into the party, which they learn is a birthday party for Max's 90-year-old grandmother. Luther replaces a video of the grandmother's life with the skating DVD, which piques Max's interest. Max agrees to have a discussion with the boys, but he concludes that it will be another five years before they are mature enough for him to manage. Zeke and Luther learn that two of Max's skaters have become sick and can no longer appear in a South Korean commercial. The boys then convince Max to give them a chance with the commercial, claiming that they can speak Korean. Zeke and Luther go to South Korea for the commercial shoot, which is to promote Kimchi Water, a beverage brand owned by Mr. Park. Although Zeke and Luther do not understand the language, they star in the commercial without any problems. However, during a press conference for Kimchi Water, Luther drinks some of the beverage and subsequently vomits on Mr. Park, who ends their deal. Max also decides not to manage the boys for the time being. Guest stars: Skyler Stone as Max Randall, Peter Choi as Mr. Park, Peggy Miley as Irma Absent: Ryan Newman as Ginger
| 44 | 23 | "Sludge" | Eyal Gordin | Bernie Ancheta & Jason Jordan | November 15, 2010 | 223 | N/A |
Zeke's cousin, Mia, visits him from Turlock but Luther holds a grudge against her because she won the position of muskrat mascot years earlier while they attended junior high school together. Kojo and Mia fall in love with each other after going on a date. When Zeke learns of their new relationship, he tells Mia about Kojo's black book, which contains the names of the many girls Kojo has dated along with miscellaneous information about each one. Mia ends the relationship upon learning about the black book, as she is convinced that he will eventually move on to a different girl. Kojo becomes depressed over the breakup and disposes of his black book in a small pool of mysterious goo referred to as sludge, which began oozing out of the ground years ago. Kojo decides that he will skate off a ramp and over the sludge pool to prove his love for Mia and win her back. Zeke convinces Mia that Kojo really does love her, and they rush to the sludge pool to stop him from going through with his stunt, but they are too late. Kojo successfully skates over the sludge, and he and Mia reconcile afterwards. Guest stars: Lili Simmons as Mia, Jazzlyn Marae as Janet Absent: Ryan Newman as Ginger
| 45 | 24 | "Goin' Zoomin'" | Eyal Gordin | Tom Burkhard | November 22, 2010 | 224 | N/A |
Zeke and Luther receive skateboarding sponsorship offers from two individuals: Dino Coletti of Riot Skates, and Mr. White of Fun Corp. Dino offers the boys their own specially designed skateboard to sponsor, while Mr. White offers them that and plenty of skateboarding gear. The boys sign with Fun Corp. but are disappointed with their new skate outfits and helmets, which are part of the company's new Goin' Zoomin' skateboarding product line. The boys are also disappointed that Mr. White has ignored their design ideas for their ideal skateboard; their new skateboards are cheaply made and poorly designed. During the launch event for Goin' Zoomin', Zeke and Luther tell the audience not to buy the product line, and they eventually end their deal with Fun Corp. The boys then sign with Dino, who allows them to sponsor skateboards with their own design. Meanwhile, Kojo agrees to help Ozzie train for an upcoming strongman competition so he can win back his girlfriend Kamiko, who views Ozzie as weak. In exchange, Ozzie agrees to have his parents' locksmith company, Kephart Keys, sponsor Kojo as a skateboarder. With motivation from Kojo, Ozzie wins the competition and reconciles with Kamiko. Kojo is then given a key shaped skateboard to sponsor Kephart Keys. Guest stars: Nate Hartley as Ozzie, Jay Brian Winnick as Mr. White, Dave Sheridan as Dino Coletti
| 46 | 25 | "Ball of Trash" | Matt Dearborn | Matt Dearborn | November 29, 2010 | 218 | N/A |
Because Ramps is located behind a mini mall, garbage frequently builds up in the area. Years ago, the skateboarders made an agreement with Dottie, an aerobics instructor, to clean up the trash. In exchange, Dottie allows the skateboarders to skate in the area behind the mall. Zeke and Luther eventually began compiling the garbage into a giant trash ball because they thought it would be funny, but it has now become a public nuisance. Zeke and Luther try to sell the trash ball, but they ultimately decide to pay a young man named Bob $50 to dispose of it for them. Bob dumps the trash ball off of a Gilroy pier, and the trash begins washing up on a beach by the next morning. A teen activist group, which includes Lisa Grubner, has volunteered to clean up the garbage and find clues regarding the culprits. Because the trash includes items from Zeke and Luther with their names on it, they volunteer for the group so they can retrieve their items and avoid suspicions that they were the ones who dumped the trash into the ocean. After the cleanup, Lisa and the boys are invited onto Dale Davis' talk show to discuss the activist group's interest in an endangered lizard. When the lizard spits on the boys, they reveal that they do not care about the animal and wind up admitting that they were partially responsible for the trash mess. Meanwhile, Kojo allows Ozzie to try out his new body spray, but Ozzie experiences an allergic reaction to the spray, which harms Kojo's attempts to market it. Guest stars: Nate Hartley as Ozzie, Ron Fassler as Dale Davis, Abigail Mavity as Lisa Grubner, Valorie Hubbard as Dottie Pepper, Eric Nelsen as Bob Absent: Ryan Newman as Ginger
| 47 | 26 | "Bro-ho-ho" | Matt Dearborn | Matt Dearborn | December 6, 2010 | 226 | 0.5 |
Zeke and Luther no longer enjoy Christmas because of the unexciting presents that they have received in recent years. This year, they want the new Turf Monster skateboard. When Luther accidentally causes a mall Santa to crash his vehicle, he and Zeke bring the Santa to Zeke's house to rest and recover. Zeke and Luther decide to fill in as Santa and his elf respectively for a children's event at a mall. Meanwhile, Ginger is selling Pootie Poo dolls at an increased price, after buying them all up from stores in July. Kirby Cheddar and his mother attend the mall event, and his mother asks Luther to write down whatever Christmas presents that Kirby requests from Santa. Luther decides to write down two Turf Monsters as part of a plan to fulfill his and Zeke's Christmas desire, as they believe Kirby is already spoiled enough. The next morning, the boys retrieve the Turf Monsters from Mrs. Cheddar by saying that they are collecting unwanted Christmas gifts for needy children. However, the boys feel bad when they learn how upset Kirby is about not receiving a Pootie Poo toy for Christmas. The boys, on their skateboards, chase after a delivery truck that has purchased the last of Ginger's Pootie Poo stock, but they are unsuccessful. Meanwhile, Ginger has made plans for a spa weekend, which she intends to pay for with the money from the toy sales. However, the mall Santa convinces Ginger that Christmas is a time for giving, which inspires her to pay for a Christmas party at Don's Donuts. During the party, Kirby receives a Pootie Poo toy, after which the mall Santa flies away in a sleigh. Guest stars: Nate Hartley as Ozzie, David Gore as Kirby Cheddar, Anoush Nevart as Mrs. Cheddar, Donovan Scott as Santa, Dana Michael Woods as Elf, Mason Cook as Kid; Absent: Daniel Curtis Lee as Kojo Last appearance as a main character: Ryan Newman as Ginger

=== Season 3 (2011–12) ===
| No. overall | No. in season | Title | Directed by | Written by | Original release date | Prod. code | US viewers (millions) |
|---|---|---|---|---|---|---|---|
| 48 | 1 | "Zeke's Last Ride" | Paul Hoen | Bernie Ancheta | February 28, 2011 | 302 | 1.8 |
Zeke and Luther meet Eddie Coletti, the representative for Riot Skates who has a severe sweating problem. Eddie tells the boys that the company is having an upcoming skate jam to promote the brand. For the skate jam, Luther volunteers Zeke to perform a skateboarding trick known as the 540 McTwist, which he has never done before. Despite Zeke's confidence in achieving the trick, he falls while attempting the landing on a vert ramp and is subsequently hospitalized for severe injuries. A doctor tells Luther that Zeke will never be able to skate again, and Eddie signs Kojo to be Luther's partner in sponsoring Riot Skates. When Zeke learns of the doctor's prognosis, he leaves the hospital in a wheelchair and winds up flying off a ramp and performing a mid-air flip before landing. It helps him realize the correct method to achieve the 540 McTwist. Although Luther is initially reluctant, he agrees to help Zeke restore the use of his legs so he can attempt to perform the risky trick again. Zeke makes a full recovery in two days and successfully executes the 540 McTwist during the skate jam. Guest stars: Paul Tei as Eddie Coletti, Dana Pacheco as Dr. Linda Fontaine
| 49 | 2 | "The Unusual Suspects" | Paul Hoen | Matt Dearborn | March 7, 2011 | 301 | 2.1 |
To get away from Ginger, Zeke moves into his family's garage and hires Ozzie to give it a redesign. When Zeke moves Ginger's Junior Scout chocolates out of the garage, they wind up melting, which angers her. Meanwhile, an old kindergarten friend of Luther's named Paulie Glover has returned and wants to be friends again with Luther, who is frightened by Paulie's creepy and obsessive personality. Simultaneously, Lisa Grubner has become a nuisance to Zeke with her crush on him. Zeke tells Paulie that Luther already has Zeke as a friend, and Luther tells Lisa to leave Zeke alone. Paulie and Lisa are upset by what they are told. That night in the garage, Zeke is hit on the head with a wrench and wrapped into a rug before being dumped off of a pier. Zeke returns the next day, and he and Luther question Paulie, Lisa and Ginger to determine who tried to harm Zeke. The group eventually learns that Ozzie had snuck into Zeke's garage the night before so he could remove a rug that Ozzie disliked, believing that it did not go well with his redesign. Ozzie accidentally knocked the wrench against Zeke's head and was unaware that Zeke had fallen onto the rug because he was in such a hurry to get rid of it. Special guest star: Ryan Newman as Ginger; Guest stars: Nate Hartley as Ozzie, Abigail Mavity as Lisa Grubner, Caden Michael Gray as Paulie Glover Absent: Daniel Curtis Lee as Kojo
| 50 | 3 | "Two Guys, a Car, and a Wild Bear" | Neal Israel | Tom Burkhard | March 14, 2011 | 303 | N/A |
Riot Skates gives Zeke and Luther a car with the company name on it as part of the boys' sponsorship deal. Zeke spends his and Luther's money on giant speakers for the vehicle, an idea that Luther later criticizes. Later, Zeke name-calls Luther for driving recklessly, which upsets Luther. The vehicle eventually runs out of gas, and the boys cannot afford to refuel it, so Zeke and his neighbor convert the vehicle to run on restaurant grease, which Luther also criticizes. The grease eventually attracts a wild bear which has come from the forest in search of food and a mate. Hiding in Zeke's house, the boys agree to new friendship rules: Zeke will no longer name-call Luther when he makes a mistake, and Luther will no longer criticize Zeke's ideas. The bear falls asleep on Zeke's bed, which the boys then tow to the forest so they can return the animal. Afterwards, the boys agree that exceptions can apply to their new rules. Meanwhile, Ginger is upset to have received a "B" in her school gym class because one of her push-ups was considered incorrect by Coach Carp. Ginger and Carp then engage in a prank war, ultimately resulting in Carp giving Ginger an "A". Special guest star: Ryan Newman as Ginger; Guest stars: Kevin Farley as Coach Carp Absent: Daniel Curtis Lee as Kojo
| 51 | 4 | "Hyp-Bro-Tized" | Paul Hoen | David Regal | March 28, 2011 | 305 | N/A |
A troublesome motorcycle gang known as the Road Scabs, which travels through Gilroy once a year, has arrived in the city. Meanwhile, Luther likes a waitress at Don's Donuts named Bridget, but he becomes nervous whenever he is around her. To help himself, Luther contacts the Date Helpers service and learns that his grandmother works as a volunteer for the service. Nana is unable to teach Luther the proper way to act on a date, so Zeke arranges for Dr. Chili Ricardo to give Luther one of his hypnosis sessions to make him more confident. Luther's new confidence is activated by saying the word "taco", while "burrito" returns him to normal. While on a date with Bridget, Luther's new personality causes him to fall in love with Rhonda, a member of the Road Scabs who had a fight with her boyfriend, Turk. Although Turk is initially upset at Luther, he and the other members decide to welcome Luther into the Road Scabs. As Luther is being initiated into the gang, Zeke arrives and brings him out of his hypnotic state. Later, Luther spends time with Bridget and realizes that he simply needed to relax and be himself around her. Guest stars: Marianne Muellerleile as Nana Waffles, Carlos LaCamara as Dr. Ricardo, Claudia Lee as Bridget, Christiann Castellanos as Rhonda, Greg Roman as Turk
| 52 | 5 | "Daredevils!" | Paul Hoen | Jason Jordan | April 4, 2011 | 306 | N/A |
Bobby Dicey, the world's greatest daredevil, is retiring and has planned one final stunt, to be held in Gilroy. Bobby invites several people – including Zeke, Luther and Kojo – to compete in a series of tests to determine who will get to join the team for his stunt. At the end of the tests, Bobby tells everyone that none of them won the competition because they do not have what it is for which he is looking. Zeke and Luther are intrigued by what Bobby is storing inside a large building, so they sneak in and find that he is planning a human cannonball stunt. When Bobby finds the boys, he declares them the winners of the contest for their ill-advised and bold decision to sneak in. Zeke and Luther help Bobby plan the stunt, in which he will shoot himself through a small hole in each of several wall panels arranged in a row. Watermelon-headed dummies are shot out of the cannon as a test, and they indicate that the stunt needs adjustments so Bobby does not hurt himself. Zeke and Luther become worried that Bobby is not thinking clearly about the stunt, so they visit his hotel room to have him call it off. However, they learn that Bobby has an engineering degree and has been thoroughly researching the stunt to ensure its success. Luther accidentally knocks Bobby out of his hotel window, and he is subsequently hospitalized. Bobby decides to let Zeke pose as him and perform the stunt. After Zeke succeeds, Bobby becomes inspired to continue his daredevil career. Guest stars: Jimmy Shubert as Bobby Dicey, Ron Fassler as Dale Davis
| 53 | 6 | "Sibling Rivalries" | Jonathan Judge | Devin Bunje & Nick Stanton | April 11, 2011 | 309 | N/A |
Eddie tells Zeke and Luther that they will appear in a new television series for Skate TV titled Skate Cribs, which provides viewers with tours of skateboarders' houses. Ahead of filming, the boys meet the show host, Dezzy McCarthy, who wants to include the boys' mean siblings on the show. When Ginger and Roy refuse to behave for the show, the boys hold auditions for stand-in siblings who will not embarrass them. Lisa Grubner is chosen to fill in as Ginger, while Kojo is chosen as Roy. The boys' real siblings are locked up just before filming, but they escape and secretly disrupt the boys' activities to embarrass them on the show. Ginger and Roy eventually reveal themselves and tell Dezzy the truth. Eddie then tells the boys that their sponsorship deal will have to be ended because of their inability to do a basic television appearance. Eddie and the others then reveal to the boys that they are on You Been Got, a prank television series. Special guest star: Ryan Newman as Ginger Guest stars: Davis Cleveland as Roy Waffles, Abigail Mavity as Lisa Grubner, Paul Tei as Eddie Coletti, Grace Parra as Dezzy McCarthy
| 54 | 7 | "Luther Turns 4" | Neal Israel | Devin Bunje & Nick Stanton | April 18, 2011 | 304 | N/A |
Luther, who was born on Leap Day, celebrates his fourth birthday. For his birthday, Zeke and Luther stuff popcorn kernels inside an abandoned car and wait for the heat of the sun to turn the kernels into popcorn. Deputy Dingle apprehends the boys for their popcorn idea and as punishment makes them coach a team of young basketball players, the South Gilroy Slugs, who have never won a game. Luther eventually discovers a Junior Basketball loophole which states that people may play until their ninth birthday, thereby allowing him to play with the South Gilroy Slugs. Although they win the game, the young teammates are disappointed because they did not have any fun, as Luther won the game all on his own. Luther, who initially disliked being born on Leap Day, decides to start playing in other youth activities (Fencing, Wrestling & Badminton) against children half his age to become the most dominant four-year-old. Luther wins multiple trophies, although Zeke believes that he should act mature for his age and stop playing against younger children. Skunk, the leader of the South Gilroy Slugs, challenges Luther to a banned activity in which size does not matter: a shopping cart duel, in which they race their own carts down a hill. Deputy Dingle discovers the race and arrests Skunk rather than Luther because he considers Skunk to be older and therefore he should have known better than to participate in the race. Luther, feeling bad for Skunk, accepts responsibility for the race and becomes so infatuated with truth-telling, that he discloses several instances in which he and Zeke caused trouble. As punishment, the boys are required to clean up highway trash. Guest stars: Scott Beehner as Deputy Dingle, Hayden Byerly as Skunk Absent: Daniel Curtis Lee as Kojo
| 55 | 8 | "Head of Skate" | Gregory Hobson | Devin Bunje & Nick Stanton | April 25, 2011 | 313 | 0.3 |
Don's twin brother, Ron Donaldson, is the mayor of Gilroy and is running unopposed for re-election. Upon winning the election next week, Ron intends to demolish the Gilroy pier, which includes Don's Donuts, and replace it with condominiums. Zeke and Luther are upset by Ron's plan to demolish their childhood hangout spot, where they have had many memories. Because Gilroy has a law allowing 16-year-olds to run for mayor, Zeke declares his candidacy so he can save the pier and Don's Donuts. Zeke wins, and makes Luther his deputy mayor. Luther is upset because Zeke did not make him Director of Bulldozers, and because the deputy mayor does not have a single job duty. When Luther spots a bulldozer on the pier, he decides to take control of it, deeming it a safety hazard. Luther accidentally crashes into Don's Donuts just after Zeke has declared it a historic building. Luther is sent to jail for damaging the building, and later works with Ron to expose Zeke's birthplace as Japan, thereby making him ineligible to serve as mayor, which local law requires to be a Gilroy-born citizen. Ron reclaims the title of mayor, and Zeke's laws are nullified, but Luther reveals that the deputy mayor shall take over in the event that the initial mayor is removed from office. Luther becomes the new mayor and reveals that Ron paid him to oust Zeke. Luther gives the money to Don to repair the donut shop. Because Luther's parents do not want him to be mayor, he is forced to name a replacement. Guest stars: David Ury as Don and Ron, Ron Fassler as Dale Davis, Craig Gellis as Chuck Stabswell
| 56 | 9 | "Zeke, Luther and Kojo Strike Gold" | Gregory Hobson | Tom Burkhard | May 2, 2011 | 308 | 0.3 |
Zeke and Luther get detention for not doing their history reports, and Kojo must join them after Zeke says that he only cares about skateboarding. Meanwhile, the world's largest gold nugget, Sutter's Nugget, is on display at the boys' school for two days. The nugget is being monitored by a security guard named Stan, with Ozzie as a volunteer student security guard. New Vice Principal Novotna wants Zeke, Luther and Kojo to steal the nugget as a way of testing the security. In exchange, Novotna will erase the boys' permanent record. After the boys steal the nugget and give it to Novotna, they learn that she is a wanted thief. The boys then realize that many students are anxious to see the nugget. Zeke and Luther learn that the last person to try to steal the nugget was Yuri Popovich, a Russian billionaire who escaped without the nugget. Poochie's uncle, who is a Hollywood make-up artist, transforms Luther into Yuri with a mask. Zeke arranges for Yuri and himself to meet Novotna at Don's Donuts, where Yuri will purchase the nugget. After their transaction, Novotna is arrested and the nugget is returned to the school. Guest stars: Nate Hartley as Ozzie, Lori Lively as Vice Principal Novotna, Geno Segers as Stan the Agent, Leslie Odom Jr. as Mr. Arliss Bunnyson, Mark Hutter as Yuri Popovich
| 57 | 10 | "Zeke and Lu's New Crew" | Jonathan Judge | Matt Dearborn | May 9, 2011 | 310 | 1.1 |
Zeke and Luther star in a commercial for a leather store and subsequently gain a posse made up of three fans: Paulie Glover, who keeps their skate gear clean; Teddy, who provides fruits from his father's fruit stand; and Omar, who acts as their bodyguard. Meanwhile, Ozzie is playing five separate roles in Bridget's new musical play. After Ozzie annoys the boys, Omar hangs him by his underwear, resulting in a severe wedgie injury that prevents him from appearing in the play. Zeke, Luther, and their posse agree to fill in for Ozzie, despite prior plans to attend a monster truck rally in Reno, Nevada. During rehearsal, Luther and the posse become disinterested in the play, and Luther decides to take them to the monster truck rally instead, leaving Zeke to play the five roles. On the way to Reno, Luther has second thoughts and decides to return to Gilroy, where he arrives in time to star in the play's dance finale, as Zeke is a poor dancer. Afterwards, Zeke and Luther tell the posse that they need to move on and do something for themselves instead of following Zeke and Luther everywhere. Paulie gets a job at a car wash, Teddy opens a fruit stand, and Omar joins a football team. Guest stars: Nate Hartley as Ozzie, Claudia Lee as Bridget, Caden Michael Gray as Paulie Glover, Calum Worthy as Teddy, Troy Romzek as Omar, Lorelle Billingslea as Nicole Absent: Daniel Curtis Lee as Kojo
| 58 | 11 | "Skater Girl Island" | Neal Israel | David Regal | May 23, 2011 | 316 | 0.5 |
Eddie unveils his idea for Riot Skates' new advertising campaign: Roll Into Summer, a two-week promotional tour. Eddie wants Zeke and Luther to locate a girl skater to become a co-sponsor and accompany them on the tour. The boys pursue the local legend of Skater Girl Island, a location where only girl skaters are allowed. Zeke and Luther discover Skater Girl Island, proving that the legend is true. The girls there agree to spread the word about the Roll Into Summer tour on the condition that the boys never return to Skater Girl Island. Many girls audition for the part, including Martha Plunk, one of the troublesome Plunk siblings. Luther owes a favor to Charlie and Crowbar Plunk, who demand that he make Martha the new Skate Girl, even though he and Zeke consider her to be disgusting. Eddie, Zeke and Luther interview the finalists, and Luther is unsuccessful in convincing the others that Martha should be chosen. When Zeke learns of the Plunks' plot, he and Crowbar agree to a skateboarding challenge at Skater Girl Island, where the girls have granted temporary access to the boys. Zeke and Crowbar must each grind across a rail located above muck, and if Crowbar loses, then he and his siblings must stop bullying other children. Crowbar falls into the muck, and Zeke is declared the winner. Afterwards, a girl named Suzi is chosen as the ideal Skate Girl. Guest stars: Paul Tei as Eddie Coletti, Reid Ewing as Charlie Plunk, Hayley Kiyoko as Suzi, Aimee Carrero as Tasha, Rakefet Abergel as Martha, Joe Davis Massingill as Crowbar
| 59 | 12 | "DJ PJ" | Jon Rosenbaum | Bernie Ancheta | July 11, 2011 | 311 | 0.6 |
Before Nana goes out of town for the week with Luther's parents, she leaves Zeke specific instructions for babysitting Luther. On the first night, Zeke protects Luther as he sleepwalks into Don's Donuts during a singing contest and takes the stage to rap. After Luther impresses everyone with his skills and he finds out Zeke was asked to babysit him, he becomes totally disobedient and winds up getting into a rap battle with the best rapper in town, Master Nasty. Luther accidentally bets the Riot Skates car against Master Nasty's car in a rap battle, with the winner taking both cars. However, Luther is only good at rapping when he is sleepwalking. As according to Nana's instructions, Zeke reads Luther a bedtime story, which helps him fall asleep. While sleepwalking, Luther beats Master Nasty in the rap battle and wins the vehicles. However, Zeke and Luther reject Master Nasty's car when they learn it is an old hatchback that does not run. Guest stars: Marianne Muellerleile as Nana Waffles, Lawrence Mandley as Jumpsuit Johnson, Abner Genece as Master Nasty, Linda Kerns as Bernyce
| 60 | 13 | "Trucky Cheese" | Jon Rosenbaum | Jason Jordan | July 18, 2011 | 317 | 0.8 |
After Zeke and Luther destroy Carl's new scooter, they decide to repay their debt by cleaning out Carl's storage unit. In the parking lot, they find Carl's old food truck, where he used to sell liver before going out of business. Zeke and Luther decide to sell cheese smoothies out of the food truck. Carl approves the idea, but warns the boys that they will be competing with the onion ring truck connoisseur, Johnnie Ray King, for food truck turf. After a successful day against the onion ring food truck, Johnnie sabotages the brakes and steering on Carl's food truck, and the boys wind up crashing it. Carl then reveals a longtime feud between the Waffles and the Kings, revealing Johnnie was the reason he went out of business. Luther tells Johnny that the boys have given up their food truck business, and then begs for a job in Johnnie's food truck. Johnnie hires Luther, allowing the boys to sabotage his onion ring business. Carl then purchases Johnny's business and retains him as an employee to sell cheesy onion rings. Guest stars: John Schuck as Carl, Brendan Hunt as Johnnie Ray King, Evan Lai as Louie
| 61 | 14 | "Ice Heist Baby" | Matt Dearborn | Devin Bunje & Nick Stanton | July 25, 2011 | 324 | 0.7 |
With a heat wave in Gilroy, Nana sends Zeke and Luther to the store for ice, but when the store is all out, they are sent to see the ice man, Mr. Montoya, who is selling bags of ice for twenty dollars. Zeke and Luther attempt to escape his prices by creating a wall of air conditioners, but after it comes crashing down, they must find another way to stop Mr. Montoya's control over the ice and save Gilroy from overheating. Zeke and Luther sneak into Montoya's ice facility, located in front of Ramps. The boys cause the facility to emit snow onto Ramps, where Zeke then engages Montoya in a snowball fight, in which he happily participates. Zeke realizes that Montoya simply needed to have fun after experiencing a dull childhood working for his father in the ice business. Guest stars: Nate Hartley as Ozzie, Marianne Muellerleile as Nana Waffles, Paul Tei as Eddie Coletti, Ron Fassler as Dale Davis, Eric Steinberg as Mr. Montoya, Claudia Lee as Bridget Absent: Daniel Curtis Lee as Kojo
| 62 | 15 | "Skate Troopers" | Jon Rosenbaum | David Regal | August 1, 2011 | 312 | 0.6 |
The masked stars of a television show called Skate Troopers are injured, and Zeke and Luther are hired to take their place. The show involves costumed skateboarders fighting evil alien characters known as Dorlocks. Luther, who is a big fan of the show, has a grudge against an actor named Phil because he portrays a Dorlock named Zorn. Luther and Phil's feud causes problems on the set, including an instance in which Luther objects to a script featuring the Dorlocks beating the Skate Troopers in battle, something that has never happened in the show's 23-year history. After Luther objects to the script, series creator and director Wesley Mandrake is convinced to let the Skate Troopers win in the episode. Later, Luther and Phil's feud intensifies when Luther gives Phil a fake peace offering in the form of a prune Danish that he made with the Guatemalan devil prune, the strongest prune available. After Phil experiences stomach problems from the Danish, he challenges Luther to a fight at Don's Donuts. Phil arrives to the fight with help from two cast members, and Zeke arrives after learning about the fight. During their fight, Luther and Phil become friends after learning they are both members of the Secret Brotherhood of Gork. Guest stars: Eric André as Zorn, Dan Donohue as Wesley Mandrake, Sammie Abrigo as Campfire Scout Absent: Daniel Curtis Lee as Kojo
| 63 | 16 | "Bro, Where's Our Car?" | Gregory Hobson | Matt Dearborn | August 8, 2011 | 314 | 0.5 |
Zeke and Luther arrange dates with Monica and Bridget for the beach, then learn that they have to meet with Eddie and Riot Skates CEO Jackson Cuplic at Don's Donuts. The boys attempt to have their dates and the meeting, alternating between the two. For promotional purposes, Jackson plans to have the boys drive the Riot Skates car around a baseball field during a game. However, the boys return to the beach and discover the car has been stolen. When the boys inform Jackson of the stolen car, he fires Eddie. Later, the boys learn that Jumpsuit Johnson had the car towed away. They retrieve the car from an impound lot and drive it around the baseball field as planned. Afterwards, Eddie is rehired as the boys' skateboarding manager. Guest stars: Lawrence Mandley as Jumpsuit Johnson, Paul Tei as Eddie Coletti, Scott Beehner as Deputy Dingle, Gary Grubbs as Jackson Cuplic, Claudia Lee as Bridget, Tristin Mays as Monica Lopez Absent: Daniel Curtis Lee as Kojo
| 64 | 17 | "Lie Hard" | Gregory Hobson | Jason Jordan | August 22, 2011 | 307 | 0.6 |
Luther enrolls in a foreign family adoption program so he can receive free gifts from a family in the fictional country of Naplandia. Zeke initially considers the idea dishonest, but he soon joins Luther in accepting the gifts after their new adoptive parents, Baron and Bubby, come to visit the boys in Gilroy. The boys keep their ruse going and continue to receive gifts from Baron and Bubby, who feel sorry for them. However, Baron and Bubby eventually decide to have the boys move with them to Naplandia immediately. To avoid moving, Zeke and Luther join the Civilian Auxiliary Brigade, which is led by Hootie. Baron and Bubby are upset but supportive of the boys' decision to stay in Gilroy so they can remain committed to the brigade. Because of snow moose attacks in Canada, the boys and others in the brigade are ordered to go there and herd the animals back to the wilderness. Nana, Baron and Bubby arrive as Zeke and Luther are about to embark, and the boys decide to tell the truth about their scheme. Guest stars: Marianne Muellerleile as Nana Waffles, H Michael Croner as Hootie, Alan Blumenfeld as The Baron, Miriam Flynn as Bubby Absent: Daniel Curtis Lee as Kojo
| 65 | 18 | "Bro'd Trip" | Savage Steve Holland | Bernie Ancheta | September 26, 2011 | 320 | 0.4 |
Zeke and Luther are competing in the Tempe Skate International Tournament in Arizona. To get there, Harrison Gilroy – whose family founded the city – lends the boys an RV. Zeke feels pressured by Harrison Gilroy to win the gold medal at the tournament on behalf of the city. Luther brings his pet piglet Bacon along for the trip, and Ozzie hides in the RV to get away from his obsessive and unwanted girlfriend, Martha Plunk, who follows him along the way with the help of a tracking device. On their way to the tournament, Zeke meets CJ Stone, his top skateboarding competitor in the event. However, Zeke is mocked by Stone and is embarrassed by Luther, Bacon, and Ozzie. Despite the pressure of competing against Stone, Zeke wins the gold medal at the tournament. Stone then reveals that he mocked Zeke in order to increase Zeke's confidence in winning. Guest stars: Nate Hartley as Ozzie, Jeff Doucette as Harrison Gilroy, Rakefet Abergel as Martha, Ahmed Best as Sal Sackelson, James Ryen as CJ Stone, Lorelle Billingslea as Nicole Absent: Daniel Curtis Lee as Kojo
| 66 | 19 | "The Gingernator" | Savage Steve Holland | Ethan Banville & Tom Burkhard | October 3, 2011 | 319 | 0.5 |
Zeke has become tired of Ginger's pranks on him. Zeke and Luther learn that Ozzie has developed a behavior modification microchip and applied it to his hamster, making it behave nicely. Zeke and Luther steal one of Ozzie's microchips and apply it to Ginger, which makes her behave as a nice sister to Zeke. However, when Zeke is not around, Ginger tells Luther that she is Zeke's new best friend. Ginger warns Luther to stay away from Zeke, but Zeke does not believe Luther when he is told about Ginger's threat. Luther tells Ozzie about Ginger's modification microchip, and he advises Luther to remove it, but Luther is unsuccessful. When Ozzie's hamster becomes jealous of Ozzie's mailman friend, it goes into a destructive rage, leading Ozzie to realize that the microchip produces extreme jealously in its subjects. Zeke, Luther and Ozzie team up and capture Ginger, and restore her to normal. Special guest star: Ryan Newman as Ginger; Guest star: Nate Hartley as Ozzie Absent: Daniel Curtis Lee as Kojo
| 67 | 20 | "Skate Video Awards" | Neal Israel | Tom Burkhard | November 28, 2011 | 315 | N/A |
Eddie Coletti gives Zeke and Luther the Riot Skates credit card to pay for a video to compete in the Skate Video Awards. Zeke and Luther spend exorbitant amounts of money to create an action video with various special-effects and a leprechaun, but when they show it to Eddie, he makes them realize that there is no skateboarding in their video, a necessity for competing in the award show. With little time left, the boys create a basic video of them skateboarding. Meanwhile, for the award show, Kojo and Ozzie attempt to film a skateboarding video with singer Lady Lucy, but she has no desire to be in it. Ozzie manages to film Kojo skateboarding beside Lady Lucy, and Ozzie then edits the video to give the appearance that she is skateboarding with Kojo. Zeke and Luther's video wins the award. Guest stars: Nate Hartley as Ozzie, Paul Tei as Eddie Coletti, Dana Michael Woods as Leprechaun, Jackie Tohn as Lady Lucy, Meagan Tandy as Supermodel Host
| 68 | 21 | "Skate or Swim" | Rick Weis | Lindsay Gelfand | March 5, 2012 | 322 | N/A |
Zeke and Luther decide to become skateboard managers to a boy named Spencer Spatz, who is a very talented skateboarder. Spencer signs a contract with the boys for them to officially become his manager, but they later learn that he is more interested in becoming a synchronized diver. Through the contract, Zeke and Luther are required to help Spencer fulfill his career dream, despite that they are not interested in synchronized diving. Spencer eventually removes the boys as his manager because of their lack of interest in helping him train for an upcoming diving showcase. When Spencer's diving partner, Kimmy, quits to team up with her sister for the showcase, Zeke and Luther decide to help Spencer by alternating as his partner. The boys train together ahead of the showcase, and they eventually face tough rivals once the competition begins. In their last chance to win the showcase, Zeke and Spencer perform a trick in which they skateboard off their diving boards. The trick is deemed too dangerous, but the trio still win an audience participation trophy. Spencer decides that he no longer needs managers, and Zeke and Luther decide to tear up the contract, a decision that they later regret when Spencer becomes the richest and most famous diver in history. Guest stars: Paul Tei as Eddie Coletti, Lance Chantiles-Wertz as Spencer Spatz, Beth Crosby as Coach Duffy, Bob Glouberman as Elliot Flipton, Emily Holt as Kimmy Raker, Eduardo Terry as Delivery Guy Absent: Daniel Curtis Lee as Kojo
| 69 | 22 | "Inside Luther's Brain" | Troy Rowland | Michael Carrington | March 12, 2012 | 323 | N/A |
Eddie Coletti suspends Zeke and Luther's skateboarding sponsorship and takes away their Riot Skates gear until they can improve their school grades. Zeke improves his grades, but Luther is unsuccessful in passing Mr. Phipps' English class. Luther blames his "brain guys," which are versions of himself that live in his brain and control everything he does from the pupil of his eye. In addition to teaching, Phipps is also the host of a local game show titled Gilroy Brain Busters. Zeke convinces Phipps to let the boys compete on his show, and if they win, he must pass Luther. Zeke and Luther compete on Gilroy Brain Busters against Ginger and Lisa Grubner. Luther fails to correctly answer a single question, and he and Zeke have nearly lost the competition until their competing team incorrectly answers the final question and loses all their points after betting them all. Zeke speaks into Luther's ear and orders the "brain guys" to start focusing, which results in Luther correctly answering the final question. Zeke and Luther win the game show, and Luther becomes a sponsored skater with Riot Skates again. Special guest star: Ryan Newman as Ginger; Guest stars: Paul Tei as Eddie Coletti, Abigail Mavity as Lisa Grubner, Brian Palermo as Mr. Phipps Absent: Daniel Curtis Lee as Kojo
| 70 | 23 | "Kojo Loses His Mojo" | Rick Weis | Jessica Glassberg | March 19, 2012 | 321 | 0.6 |
Kojo and Zeke are preparing to compete against each other in the upcoming Crosstown Showdown, in which skateboarders race across Gilroy. Kojo won the competition last year and continually brags about his win. Zeke hires Ken Tuckie to physically train him for the competition. When Kojo is struck by lightning, he ends his obnoxious and egotistical behavior and becomes overly friendly. Kojo also decides to drop out of the Crosstown Showdown, but Zeke eventually convinces him to participate after telling Kojo that he is a good skater. Zeke wins the competition. Meanwhile, Luther had agreed to housesit Jumpsuit Johnson's house while he was away on vacation for three weeks, but Luther has completely forgotten until now. Luther cleans up the house but accidentally damages a chandelier; to replace it, Luther gets a job at Don's Donuts. Luther learns that defective donuts can be consumed by employees, and he eventually gains weight from eating too many donuts. Guest stars: Lawrence Mandley as Jumpsuit Johnson, David Ury as Don, James Price as Ken Tuckie
| 71 | 24 | "Accidental Hero" | Jon Rosenbaum | Matt Dearborn | March 26, 2012 | 318 | 0.6 |
Luther feels like he is living in Zeke's shadow. When Zeke and Luther see a baby boy in a runaway stroller, they attempt to rescue him. Luther puts his helmet on backwards and winds up falling down while Zeke rescues the boy, who is named Jarvis and is the son of Jumpsuit Johnson. Jarvis is returned to Jumpsuit during Dale Davis' live news broadcast, and Dale mistakenly believes that Luther is the one who rescued the baby. As Luther is about to correct Dale, Zeke interrupts and acknowledges Luther as the hero so he can have some glory for a change. Luther subsequently achieves instant popularity until Jarvis reveals on a talk show that Zeke was the one who rescued him. Luther loses his fame for lying, and he decides to move to Devil Mountain, where he plans to live in a tent. Zeke goes to Devil Mountain and attempts to convince Luther to return home. While at Devil Mountain, Zeke falls and a large rock crushes his leg. Luther rescues Zeke, and his heroics are caught on tape during Dale Davis' live weather newscast, making Luther a true hero. Guest stars: Lawrence Mandley as Jumpsuit Johnson, Ron Fassler as Dale Davis, Laurel Coppock as Bambi McFadden, Kevin Kirkpatrick as Buddy Love Co-stars: Ethan Coach and Justin Coach as Jarvis
| 72 | 25 | "There's No Business Like Bro Business" (Part 1) | Neal Israel | Tom Burkhard & Matt Dearborn | April 2, 2012 | 325 | 0.6 |
Zeke and Luther send an embarrassing video of themselves to a national television show which offers $5,000 for the most embarrassing video. The show invites Zeke and Luther to Hollywood after receiving their video. Ozzie comes with the boys in hopes of becoming a Hollywood movie star. Zeke leaves Kojo in charge of Ramps, and Kojo is determined to prove that he can handle the job. After Zeke and Luther's video loses to a competitor, they decide to see the Hollywood Walk of Fame before returning home. The boys wind up meeting actor Vin Jackman, who is impressed with their skateboarding skills and invites them to his house to discuss a skateboarding stunt in his new action film, The Masked Avenger. Meanwhile, Ozzie meets Arnie Lipp, a man who claims to be a talent scout who can make Ozzie a Hollywood star for $1,000. Lacking the necessary funds, Ozzie instead pays Arnie with the boys' Riot Skates car, which he intends to buy back the next day after becoming a star. Ozzie realizes he has been conned, although he tells Zeke and Luther that he is having the car waxed. The boys learn that Vin is dating his co-star, Courtney Mills, but asks that they keep the relationship secret because gossip magazines would pay large amounts of money for a photograph of them kissing. Ozzie overhears this and plans to get such a photograph to buy back the car. During a party at Vin's house, Luther accidentally damages the music equipment and begins rapping to entertain the guests. Three J, a music producer, is impressed with Luther and wants him to perform with another rapper in a music studio. Later, Zeke and Luther meet the film director, Quentin Del Toro, and Zeke is unimpressed by the planned skateboarding scene, which involves jumping over a car. Zeke volunteers as the stuntman for a more dramatic skateboarding scene, but he learns that Quentin's new plans involve Zeke jumping from a building approximately 100 feet high and landing on a skateboard. Special guest star: Debby Ryan as Courtney Mills Guest stars: Nate Hartley as Ozzie, Steven Krueger as Vin Jackman, Philip Anthony-Rodriguez as Quentin Del Toro, Perry Anzilotti as Arnie Lipp, Jacory Gums as Three J, Tucker Albrizzi as Fish Belly
| 73 | 26 | "There's No Business Like Bro Business" (Part 2) | Neal Israel | Tom Burkhard & Matt Dearborn | April 2, 2012 | 326 | 0.7 |
Zeke has doubts about the skateboarding stunt, but decides to go through with it. Meanwhile, Luther meets his rap partner, a critical dog puppet named Chill E. Dog. Vin, who is busy playing a video game, has Zeke take Courtney on a date for him. Ozzie, thinking that Zeke is Vin, gets a photograph of Zeke and Courtney from an angle that makes it look as if the two are kissing. The photograph is sold to a magazine, and Ozzie buys back the car. Zeke successfully performs the stunt. When Vin thinks that Zeke kissed Courtney, he attempts to hurt Zeke and instead injures himself. Quentin hires Zeke to film Vin's final scene as the Masked Avenger, in which the character is unmasked by Courtney's character. While shooting the scene, Zeke decides he does not want to become famous and drops out of the project. Meanwhile, Luther ends his music deal because of his dislike for Chill E. Dog. The boys return to Gilroy. Various problems have occurred at Ramps under Kojo's leadership, and he has Zeke resume control upon returning from Hollywood. Later, Zeke, Luther and Kojo receive a preview copy of The Masked Avenger, and they are surprised to see that Ozzie was chosen for the film's unmasking scene. In shock, they refuse to acknowledge it and leave to go to Ramps. Special guest stars: Tony Hawk as himself, Debby Ryan as Courtney Mills Guest stars: Nate Hartley as Ozzie, Steven Krueger as Vin Jackman, Philip Anthony-Rodriguez as Quentin Del Toro, Jacory Gums as Three J, Tucker Albrizzi as Fish Belly, Kevin Carlson as Chill E. Dog (puppeteer), Donald Faison as Chill E. Dog (voice)
