= Ryan Whitney =

Ryan Whitney may refer to:

- Ryan Whitney (ice hockey) (born 1983), American ice hockey player
- Ryan Whitney (actress) (born 1998), American actress, singer, and model
