= Zeke and Luther =

American sitcom

- Created by: Matt Dearborn; Tom Burkhard
- Starring: Hutch Dano; Adam Hicks; Daniel Curtis Lee; Ryan Newman
- Opening theme: performed by Hutch Dano, Adam Hicks and Daniel Curtis Lee
- Composers: Christopher Brady; Chris Alan Lee
- Country of origin: United States
- Original language: English
- No. of seasons: 3
- No. of episodes: 73 (list of episodes)

Production
- Executive producers: Matt Dearborn; Tom Burkhard
- Camera setup: Single-camera film
- Running time: ~23 minutes
- Production company: Turtle Rock Productions

Original release
- Network: Disney XD
- Release: June 15, 2009 – April 2, 2012

Zeke and Luther is an American teen sitcom created by Matt Dearborn and Tom Burkhard. The show aired on Disney XD from June 15, 2009 to April 4, 2012. It tells the story about two best friends setting their sights on becoming the world's greatest skateboarders. The show stars Hutch Dano, Adam Hicks, Daniel Curtis Lee, and Ryan Newman. Zeke and Luther is set in the northern part of Gilroy, California, specifically in the fictional area of Pacific Terrace, which is stated frequently throughout the series. Gilroy was also mentioned occasionally in the Disney Channel series Even Stevens, which was also created by Zeke and Luther co-creator Matt Dearborn.

The series premiered on Disney XD on June 15, 2009, though the episode "Bros Go Pro" was made available to download for free on iTunes two weeks before the series' television premiere. On August 2, 2010, it was announced that Zeke and Luther had been renewed for a third season which premiered on February 28, 2011. In a June 2011 interview with Deadline Hollywood, Matt Dearborn confirmed that the show's third season would be its last. The one-hour, two-part series finale aired on April 2, 2012.

== Cast ==
The cast of Zeke and Luther (from left to right), Hutch Dano, Ryan Newman, Daniel Curtis Lee, and Adam Hicks.

=== Main ===
- Hutch Dano as Ezekiel ”Zeke” Falcone. Zeke was born in Japan, as revealed in the episode "Head of Skate". He was born on April 7 as revealed in "Not My Sister's Keeper" and lives in Gilroy, California. He is smarter than Luther, but still he is a C− student and only got an A+ once in the episode, "Board in Class". His biggest weakness however is his crush on Olivia Masterson, his neighbor from across the street, but later on in the series really does not care for girls much and thinks that the only "perfect girl" is his skateboard, as he says in the episode "Double Crush." His last name is revealed to be Falcone in the episode "The Bro List". As of mid-season 2 and 3 he and Luther become sponsored by Riot Skates.
- Adam Hicks as Luther Jerome Waffles. Luther was born in Don's Donuts, as revealed in the episode "Head of Skate". He was born on February 29, as revealed in the episode "Luther Turns 4". Best friends to Zeke, cup stacking champion, turkey jerky enthusiast, he can be a bit of an airhead sometimes and is an excessive gamer. He adopted a rat and named it Lucky because he believed it to be a good luck charm, but it was captured by his neighbor, "Jumpsuit" Johnson. Luther is also a C− student in class but in the episode "Summer School", Luther gets an A+ by filling in the circles on his ScanTron test sheet in such a way that it resembles a T. rex. He and Zeke become sponsored by Riot Skates as of mid-season 2.
- Daniel Curtis Lee as Kornelius "Kojo" Jonesworth. Kojo is kind of a friend to Zeke and Luther but also a rival for the reputation of best skater in town. In the beginning of the series he disliked Zeke and Luther equally and referred to them as losers but later on they worked it out. He is full of himself to the point of him having his own calendar. He is sponsored by "Dastardly Skate". Kojo calls his girlfriends "female ladies". It is revealed in the episode "Luck Be a Rodent Tonight" that his mother's name is Nancy. He also thinks he is a better skater than both Zeke and Luther. When something goes well for him he will usually say "Watch out!", and then slaps his buttocks. Kojo had a crush on Zeke's cousin Mia. However, since Mia stayed in Gilroy for only a few days, he dated an extremely tall (yet pleasant and helpful) blonde model in the episode "Daredevils". As revealed in the episode "Kojo's BFF", Kojo is also a big fan of turkey jerky.
- Ryan Newman as Ginger Falcone (seasons 1–2 main; season 3 recurring). She is Zeke Falcone's younger sister and the main antagonist of the series. In the episode "Bros Go Pro", she uses the boys to make money. She is smart and constantly looks for ways to torture Zeke, like telling Olivia he likes her and ratting Zeke and Luther out when they hid in the episode "Bros Go Pro". She also has a habit for making stands such as a falafel stand in the pilot episode and a lemonade stand in the episode "Bros Go Pro". She stresses personal hygiene and having a clean and sanitary surrounding as seen in the episode "Robo-Luth" She is also an accomplished flutist and can also tumble as shown in the episode "Skate Camp".

=== Recurring characters ===
- Nate Hartley as Oswald "Ozzie" Kepphart, a local power walker and a nerd who wears large glasses. He used to hate skateboarding but became a part-time skater, the first sport he did not quit after a day, and eventually became a skater, though not a very good one. He occasionally sticks his butt out as a rude gesture, which annoys Luther. When he skates, he flaps his arms as if he is attempting to fly.
- David Ury as Donald "Don" Donaldson, the owner and proprietor of Don's Donuts, Zeke and Luther's favorite hangout. In the episode "Luther Leads", Luther realizes that Don is the only one that works at Don's Donuts, although he hires more people in later episodes.
- Marianne Muellerleile as Dorothy Joanne "Nana" Waffles, Luther's grandmother. Nana lives in an apartment with her husband Carl. She often inspires Luther because he does not want to disappoint her loft view of him, and the boys often come to her aid when she is in trouble.
- Abigail Mavity as Lisa Grubner, a young, geeky girl who has an overwhelming crush on Zeke. She lives in a pink dollhouse in her parents' driveway and is an avid flautist and tumbler. Her first appearance was in the episode "Donut Jockey".
- Scott Beehner as Deputy Dingle, a bumbling police officer who is always onto Zeke and Luther's shenanigans, but is easily bribed by turkey jerky as seen in "Bro, Where's Our Car?". Although an officer, he is very stupid, and also can be strict.
- Lawrence Mandley as Reginald "Jumpsuit" Johnson, Zeke and Luther's cranky ex-astronaut neighbor who commonly growls and has a gravity simulator in his garage. His nickname is because he wears a jumpsuit every day. He once called Luther a menace but made no comment about Zeke.
- Ron Fassler as Dale Davis, a local television news reporter always on the scene of a big event.
- Tristin Mays as Monica Lopez, Kojo's on-and-off cheerleader girlfriend. She also appears in the episode "Bro, Where's Our Car?" as a Junior Miss Gilroy candidate who, alongside Bridget, is taken to the beach by Zeke and Luther in an attempt to woo them.
- Lily Jackson as Poochie McGruder (seasons 1–2), Ginger's cheerful friend who helps her to prank Zeke. She likes clapping at anything Ginger says or does, and her catchphrase is "Yay!". She wears glasses.
- Juliet Holland-Rose as Olivia Masterson (season 1). Formerly the olive girl for the "Langley Olives" company, she was once Zeke's next door neighbor and crush. She tried designing him a skater look in the episode "Cape Fear", but only for it to fail, mainly to a large cape that became a safety hazard. It is noted that she has a crush on Zeke. She did not know that he liked her back until the episode "Adventure Boy". She likes brave guys.
- Andy Pessoa as Garrett "Stinky Cast" Delfino (seasons 1–2), a local boy who constantly wears the same sleeveless white shirts, jean shorts and trademark cast on his arm. He is Zeke and Luther's camera guy. He has the hugest crush on Ginger which Zeke uses as leverage to pay for Stinky Cast's videos. He had his cast removed in the episode "The Big Red Stacking Machine" which he was upset about due to losing his trademark. He then proceeded to try to injure himself to get a new cast and succeeded, thus restoring his name.
- David Gore as Kirby Cheddar (seasons 1–2). He lives near Zeke and Luther. He plays the airdrums and the trombone. His mother is very overprotective.
- Reid Ewing and Chris Zylka as Charlie and Doyce Plunk (entire run and seasons 1–2, respectively). Brothers that are always ready to give Zeke and Luther a hard time, and they are their archrivals. They come from a family of barbers and they play pranks on other teens by cutting their hairs.
- Davis Cleveland as Roy Waffles (seasons 2–3), Luther's younger and rarely mentioned brother. He is obsessed with playing video games and stays in his room so much that he did not even know what the sun was when Zeke and Luther took him outside. When someone takes his video game away from him, he gets "Roy Rage" and becomes super strong, allowing him to bend metal bars and lift a car. He has appeared in the episodes "Little Bro, Big Trouble" and "Sibling Rivalries".
- Carlos Lacámara as Dr. Ricardo (season 2–3), a doctor who Zeke and Luther regularly visit who sometimes does not give the best prescriptions.
- Paul Tei as Eddie Coletti (season 3), the owner of Riot Skates, the company who Zeke and Luther are sponsored by. He is known to have a major sweating problem.
- Claudia Lee as Bridget (season 3), a waitress at Don's Donuts and Luther's love interest. She is a sensible person who is surrounded by idiots.

=== Notable guest stars ===
- Eric André as Zorn
- Curtis Armstrong as Clarence Fitzle
- Ahmed Best as Sal Sackelson
- Diego Boneta as Tiki Delgado
- Austin Butler as Rutger Dundee
- Tony Hawk as himself
- Brendan Hunt as Johnnie King
- John Kapelos as Discount Dave
- Hayley Kiyoko as Suzi Vandelintzer
- Rey Mysterio as himself
- Leslie Odom Jr. as Mr. Arliss Bunnyson
- Debby Ryan as Courtney Mills
- Lili Simmons as Mia
- French Stewart as Garm Garoosh

== Episodes ==
Season	Episodes	Originally released	
Season	Episodes	First released	Last released
1	21	June 15, 2009	February 1, 2010
2	26	March 15, 2010	December 6, 2010
3	26	February 28, 2011	April 2, 2012

== Broadcast ==
The show is broadcast worldwide on Disney Channel and Disney XD. Some episodes are also available on the DisneyXD and DisneyNow apps, and all episodes are available for purchase on iTunes. As of 2019, the entire series is available for streaming on Disney+.

=== Season 1 ===
Season 1 premiered on August 15, 2009, in Australia and New Zealand, on September 20, 2009, in Canada, on October 3, 2009, in the United Kingdom and Ireland, on November 15, 2009, in India, and on December 13, 2009, in Singapore, Hong Kong, the Philippines, and Romania.

=== Season 2 ===
Season 2 premiered on June 28, 2010, in Australia and New Zealand, on March 12, 2010, in Canada, on September 18, 2010, in the United Kingdom and Ireland, on June 15, 2010, in India, and on April 17, 2011, in Singapore, Hong Kong, the Philippines, and Romania.

=== Season 3 ===
Season 3 premiered on February 28, 2011, and ended on April 2, 2012. Season 3 was the series' final season.

== Reception ==
The show has been compared both favorably and unfavorably to the Nickelodeon sitcom Drake & Josh.
