= Douglas Smith (actor) =

Canadian actor

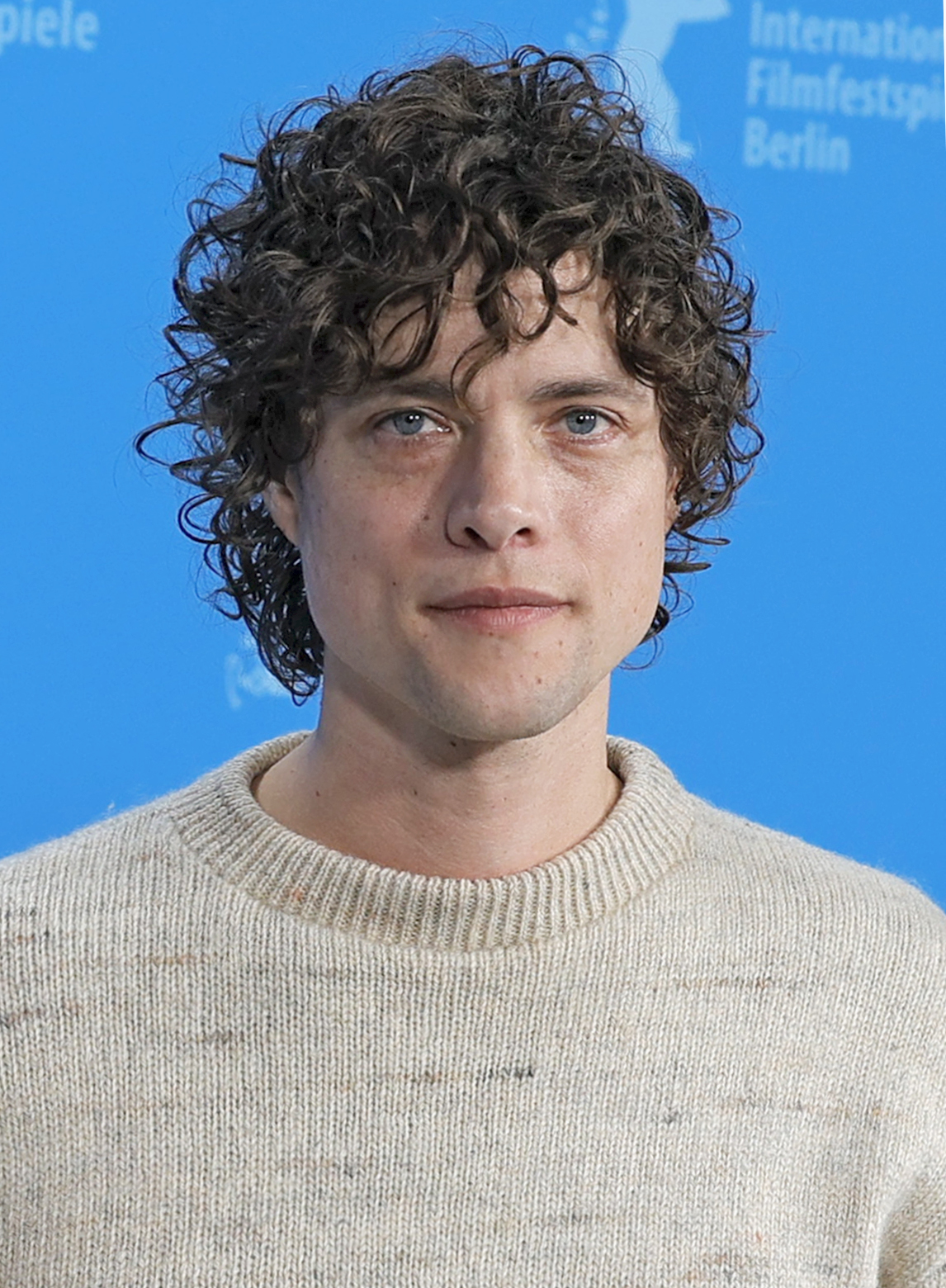
- Smith in 2024
- Born: Douglas Alexander Smith; June 22, 1985 (age 41); Toronto, Ontario, Canada
- Occupation: Actor
- Years active: 1996–present
- Relatives: Gregory Smith (brother)

Douglas Alexander Smith (born June 22, 1985) is a Canadian actor known for his work on the HBO series Big Love as Ben Henrickson. His other work includes Santa's Slay (2005), Percy Jackson: Sea of Monsters (2013), Terminator Genisys (2015), Vinyl, Miss Sloane (both 2016), When We Rise (2017), The Alienist (2018–2020), and the second season of HBO's Big Little Lies (2019).

== Early life ==
Smith was born in Toronto, Ontario, Canada, the son of Terrea (née Oster), an American-born schoolteacher, and Maurice Smith, a producer of low-budget films who is originally from England. Smith's mother appeared in several of the films that his father produced during the 1980s. He is the younger brother of actor Gregory Smith.

== Career ==
Smith has been acting since he was cast as Malvolio in his fourth grade production of Shakespeare's comedy Twelfth Night. His first film role was playing a young version of Brendan Fraser's character in Blast from the Past (1999). As a teenager, he went to Australia to play the lead role as an American boy living in Australia in a series called Out There. Early in his career, Smith made several appearances on television procedurals, including CSI: Crime Scene Investigation, CSI: Miami, Close to Home, Family Law, The X-Files, Crossing Jordan, and Cold Case.

Smith is known for his regular role as Ben Henrickson on the HBO series Big Love, which aired for five seasons. He also played the role of Edward Porris in Brandon Cronenberg's directorial debut, Antiviral. The film competed in the Un Certain Regard section at the 2012 Cannes Film Festival and took home the award for Best First Canadian Feature at the 2012 Toronto International Film Festival. In late 2012, Smith filmed the musical comedy-horror film Stage Fright. He played the roles of both Metal Killer and Buddy, performing two musical numbers in the film. Stage Fright premiered at the 2014 SXSW Film Festival and was released by Magnolia Pictures. In 2013, he starred as Tyson, the cyclops half-brother of Percy Jackson, in the film Percy Jackson: Sea of Monsters. He also began production on the horror film Ouija for Universal and Platinum Dunes.

An alumnus of RADA's Shakespeare Summer School, Smith made his off-Broadway debut in 2014, starring in the New York premiere of Simon Stephens' Punk Rock at the Lucille Lortel Theatre in the West Village. He played William Carlisle. The production and Smith's performance received favorable reviews. David Rooney of The Hollywood Reporter wrote, "In such an exemplary cast, it's unfair to single out any one of the seven principal actors for special praise. But Smith, best known for HBO's Big Love, is sad, scary and transfixing." The production was nominated for both OBIE and Drama League Awards.

In 2015, Smith played a minor role in Terminator Genisys. He had a significant arc on HBO's Vinyl in 2016. He then returned to the horror genre in The Bye Bye Man, where he starred in the role of Elliot. In 2017, he portrayed Dustin Lance Black in When We Rise, an eight-part docudrama based on the memoirs of LGBT activist Cleve Jones and directed by Gus Van Sant, Dustin Lance Black, Dee Rees and Thomas Schlamme. Soon after, Smith joined the cast of The Alienist, a 19th-century crime drama created by Cary Fukunaga based on the 1994 novel The Alienist. His turn as one half of the darkly comedic Isaacson duo earned praise from critics like David Nevins of The Guardian who, in his review of the show, wrote: "Two of the best performances, though, are those of Matthew Shear and Douglas Smith as the brothers Isaacson, two bright and innovative Jewish forensic science specialists who stick out like sore thumbs in the very Irish-Catholic environs of Manhattan law enforcement."

In 2019, Smith played an integral role in the second season of HBO's Big Little Lies as Corey Brockfield, a co-worker and love interest of main character Jane Chapman. He, along with the rest of the cast, were nominated for the Screen Actors Guild Award for Outstanding Performance by an Ensemble in a Drama Series. In 2020, he reprised his role as Marcus Isaacson in the second season of The Alienist. In 2022, he played the supporting role of Bill Johnson in Olivia Wilde's film Don't Worry Darling. He also starred in the musical drama The Swearing Jar, which premiered at the 2022 Toronto International Film Festival. Smith appeared in Atom Egoyan's film Seven Veils, which made its premiere at the 2023 Toronto International Film Festival. He plays a supporting role in Kevin Costner's Horizon: An American Saga – Chapter 1 which premiered at the 2024 Cannes Film Festival, and guest-starred as Jimmy Olsen in the final season of Superman & Lois.

== Personal life ==
He married Patricia Travis in April 2018.

== Filmography ==
=== Film ===
Year	Title	Role	Notes
1999	Blast from the Past	Adam Webber (age 11)	
2002	Trancers 6	Punk #1	
2002	Partners in Action	Teddy	
2003	Hangman's Curse	Elijah Springfield	
2004	Sleepover	Gregg	
2004	State's Evidence	Scott	
2005	Rock the Paint	Josh	
2005	Santa's Slay	Nicolas Yuleson	
2006	Citizen Duane	Duane Balfour	
2007	Remember the Daze	Pete	
2012	Antiviral	Edward Porris	
2013	Treading Water	Mica	Also titled The Boy Who Smells Like Fish
2013	Percy Jackson: Sea of Monsters	Tyson	
2014	Stage Fright	Buddy Swanson	
2014	Hard Drive	Ditch	
2014	Ouija	Pete	
2015	Terminator Genisys	Eric Thompson	
2015	Evan's Crime	Evan White	
2016	Miss Sloane	Alex	
2017	The Bye Bye Man	Elliot	
2017	Bottom of the World	Alex	
2022	Don't Worry Darling	Bill Johnson	
2022	The Swearing Jar	Owen	
2023	Exposure	Tanner	
2023	Seven Veils	Luke	
2024	All the Lost Ones	Ethan	
2024	Horizon: An American Saga – Chapter 1	Sig	
2024	Horizon: An American Saga – Chapter 2	Sig	
2024	Die Alone	Ethan	
2026	Lunar Sway	Stew	

=== Television ===
Year	Title	Role	Notes
1996	The Death Game	Tristan	TV film
1996	The X-Files	The Pitcher	Episode: "Home"
1998	The Outer Limits	Douglas	Episode: "In to Zone"
2001	Family Law	Patrick Samson	Episode: "Sex, Lies, and Internet"
2003	Out There	Reilly Evans	Main role
2003	Stuck in the Middle with You	Sam	TV film
2003	Cold Case	16-year-old Ryan Bayes	Episode: "Churchgoing People"
2004	Everwood	Gavin Curtis	Episode: "Controlling Interest"
2004	Joan of Arcadia	Daniel Shoalar	Episode: "State of Grace"
2004	The Guardian	Jay	Episode: "Without Consent"
2004	CSI: Miami	Jason Henderson	Episode: "Invasion"
2006	Crossing Jordan	Steven Reynolds	Episode: "Mysterious Ways"
2006	Close to Home	Colin Parks	Episode: "The Shots"
2006–2007	CSI: Crime Scene Investigation	Marlon West	Episodes: "The Unusual Suspect" & "Goodbye and Good Luck"
2006–2011	Big Love	Ben Henrickson	Main role
2009	Hawthorne	Curtis	Episode: "Night Moves"
2010	Flashpoint	Carlton Hayward	Episode: "Whatever it Takes"
2011	Margene's Blog	Ben Henrickson	Episode: "Girls Gotta Dance"
2013	Rookie Blue	Chuck	Episode: "You Are Here"
2013	Drop Dead Diva	Kieran	Episode: "Trust Me"
2014	Betas	Zack Casper	2 episodes
2016	Vinyl	Gary / Xavier	3 episodes
2016	Motive	Dave Briggs Jr.	Episode: "Remains to Be Seen"
2016	12 Deadly Days	Sammy	Episode: "Love Bites"
2017	When We Rise	Young Man	3 episodes
2018–2020	The Alienist	Marcus Isaacson	Main role
2019	Big Little Lies	Corey	Recurring role
2021	Clarice	Tyson Conway	Recurring role
2024	Superman & Lois	Jimmy Olsen	Episode: "A Regular Guy"
2025	Will Trent	Special Agent Gross	2 episodes

== Awards and nominations ==
Year	Award	Category	Work	Result
2020	Screen Actors Guild Awards	Outstanding Performance by an Ensemble in a Drama Series	Big Little Lies	Nominated
2005	Young Artist Award	Best Performance in a Feature Film	Sleepover	Nominated
