= Exposure (2023 film) =

- Release poster
- Directed by: Peter Cannon
- Written by: Peter Cannon
- Produced by: Jordan Michaud-Scorza; Tanner Sawitz
- Starring: Douglas Smith; Margo Harshman; Abraham Rodriguez; Ryan Whitney; Alex Feldman; Kevin McCorkle; Gary Poux; Chanel Minnifield
- Cinematography: Michelle Kwong
- Edited by: Joel Blacker
- Music by: Miller Wrenn
- Production company: Leviathan Filmworks
- Distributed by: Gravitas Ventures
- Release dates: October 17, 2023 (Newport Beach Film Festival); July 9, 2024 (United States)
- Country: United States
- Language: English

Exposure is a 2023 American psychological thriller film written and directed by Peter Cannon. It stars Douglas Smith, Margo Harshman, Abraham Rodriguez, Ryan Whitney, Alex Feldman, Kevin McCorkle, Gary Poux and Chanel Minnifield.

Exposure had its world premiere at the Newport Beach Film Festival on October 17, 2023, and it was released on digital on July 9, 2024.

== Cast ==
- Douglas Smith as Tanner
- Margo Harshman as Nicole
- Abraham Rodriguez as Ezekiel
- Ryan Whitney as Izzy
- Alex Feldman as Charlie
- Kevin McCorkle as Pat
- Gary Poux as Angelo
- Chanel Minnifield as Lily

== Production ==
In October 2023, a psychological thriller film written and directed by Peter Cannon titled Exposure had its world premiere at the Newport Beach Film Festival, with Douglas Smith, Margo Harshman, Abraham Rodriguez, Ryan Whitney, Alex Feldman, Kevin McCorkle, Gary Poux and Chanel Minnifield rounding out the main cast.

== Release ==
Exposure was released in the United States on digital on July 9, 2024.
