= Tom Burkhard =

American television producer and writer

- Born: Thomas Harold Burkhard; April 4, 1963 (age 63); Chicago, Illinois, U.S.
- Occupations: Television producer, writer
- Years active: 1990–present
- Known for: Zeke and Luther

Tom Burkhard (born April 4, 1963) is an American television producer and writer. He has written and produced for the television series Full House, Caroline in the City, Even Stevens, Phil of the Future, Living with Fran and Zeke and Luther which he co-created with Matt Dearborn.

Burkhard was born in Chicago, Illinois. The family later moved to Trenton, Michigan where he graduated from Trenton High School. He later graduated from Oklahoma Christian University receiving a Bachelor of Arts in Marketing. He currently resides in Mar Vista, Los Angeles.
