= Matt Dearborn =

American screenwriter

- Born: Boulder, Colorado, United States
- Occupations: Television director, producer, writer
- Years active: 1988–present

Matthew "Matt" Dearborn is an American television producer, writer and director.

== Career ==
Dearborn has written over 100 produced episodes of television, including, Beverly Hills, 90210, Eerie, Indiana, Parker Lewis Can't Lose, The Secret World of Alex Mack, Sliders, Phil of the Future and Even Stevens which he created. In 2008, he and Tom Burkhard created the series Zeke and Luther for Disney XD. On a dare from a friend, Dearborn auditioned for a recurring part on the short-lived series TV 101. He got the part, and also ended up writing three episodes for the series.

For creating Even Stevens, Dearborn received three consecutive Emmy Award nominations for Outstanding Children's series. In 2001, Even Stevens won the BAFTA Award for Outstanding International Children's series.

He graduated from California State University, Sacramento in 1982, majoring in Communication Studies.

He was previously married to former Miss USA contestant and actress Kelli McCarty from July 7, 2000, until 2006, but their divorce was finalized on March 9, 2009.
