= Ryan Whitney (actress) =

American actress (born 1998)

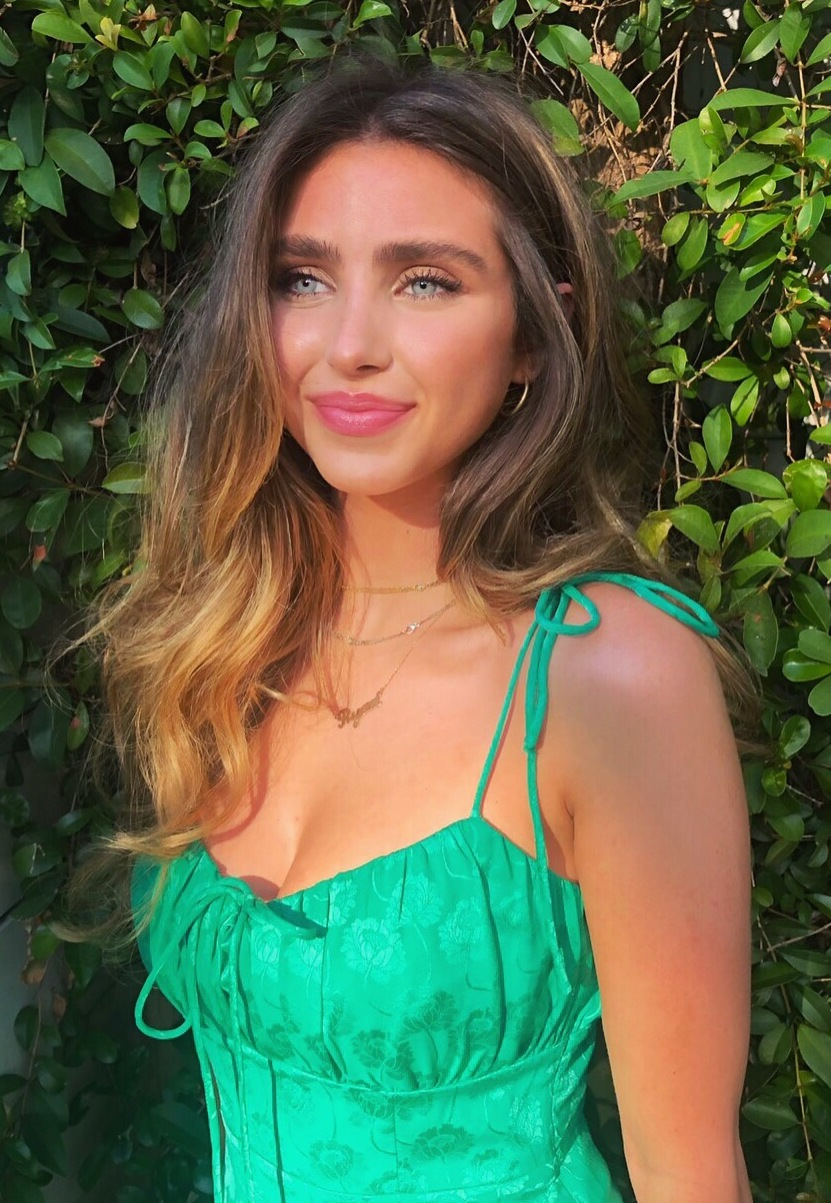
- Whitney in 2019
- Born: Ryan Whitney Newman; April 24, 1998 (age 28); New York, U.S.
- Other name: Ryan Newman
- Education: University of California, Los Angeles (BA)
- Occupation: Actress
- Years active: 2006–present
- Spouse: Griffin Levitan (m. 2026)

Ryan Whitney Newman (born April 24, 1998), known as Ryan Whitney (previously Ryan Newman) is an American actress. She is known for her roles as Ginger Falcone in Disney XD's Zeke and Luther, Allison in The Thundermans, Cindy Collins in Zoom and Emily Hobbs in See Dad Run.

== Early life and education ==
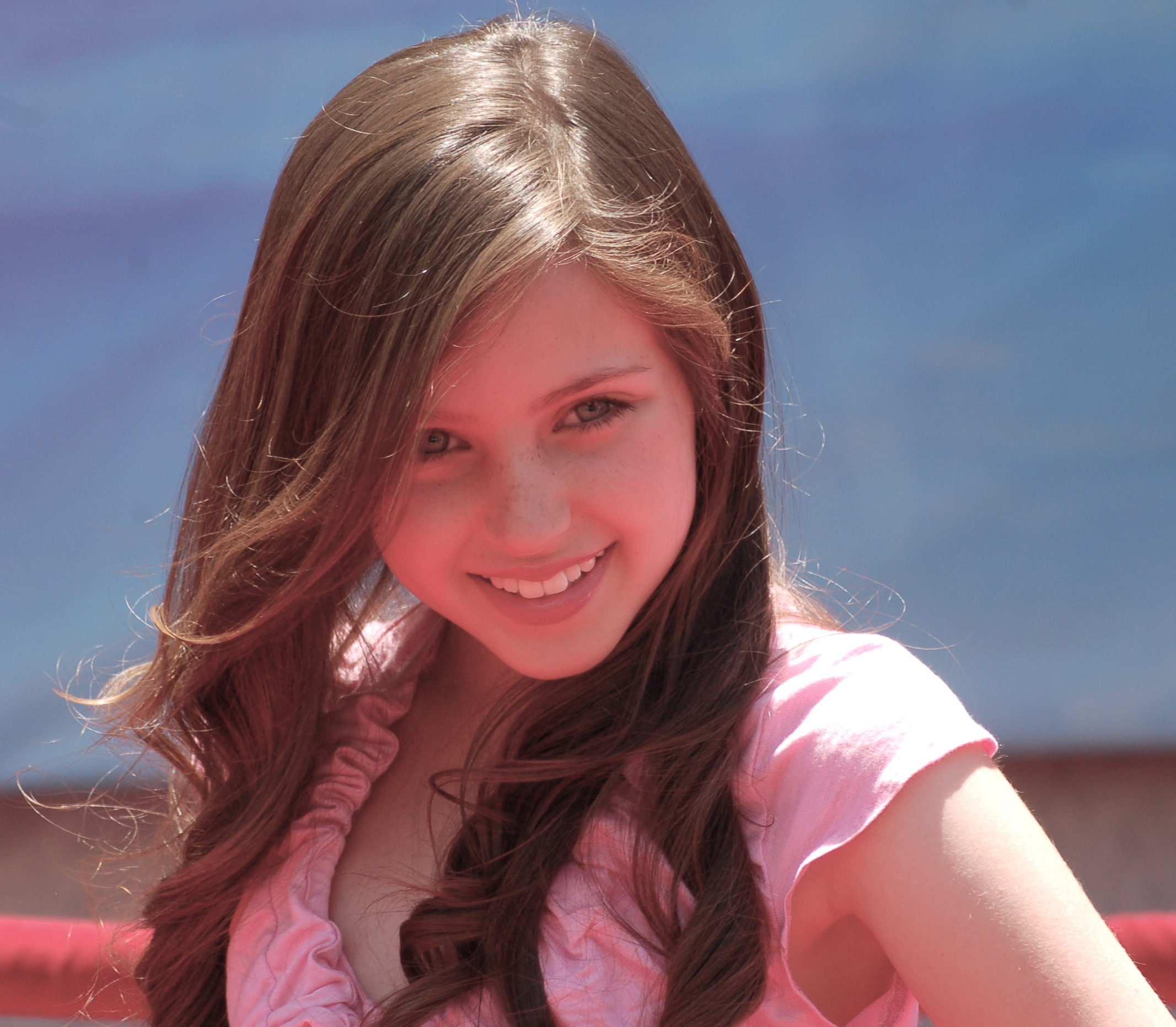
Whitney in 2009

She attended UCLA and graduated summa cum laude in 2019 with a BA in psychology.

== Career ==
Whitney made her debut film appearances in the 2006 films Monster House and Zoom. In television, she appeared in several seasons of Disney's hit show Hannah Montana as a young Miley as well as in the Disney Channel Original Series Good Luck Charlie. Later, she appeared as the antagonist Ginger Falcone in Zeke and Luther. In 2010, Whitney won the Young Artist Award for Best Performance in a TV Series by a Leading Actress

In 2012, Whitney was cast as Emily Hobbs on See Dad Run, which premiered on Nick at Nite on October 6, 2012. See Dad Run ran three seasons before ending in 2015. At the end of July 2014 she traveled to Cambodia, supporting Heifer International. In 2015, Whitney was cast in Sharknado 3: Oh Hell No! playing the role of Claudia Shepard, which she took over from Aubrey Peeples, who played the role in Sharknado.

== Filmography ==
=== Film ===
Year	Title	Role	Notes	Ref(s)
2006	Monster House	Elizabeth (as Ryan Whitney)		
2006	Zoom	Cindy Collins/Princess	Also known as Zoom: Academy for Superheroes	
2008	Lower Learning	Carlotta (as Ryan Newman)		
2012	The Call	Becky (as Ryan Newman)	Short	
2016	How We Work 2	Ryan (as Ryan Newman)	Short	
2016	Super Novas	Marcie (as Ryan Newman)		
2016	The Thinning	Sarah Foster (as Ryan Newman)		
2017	Alexander IRL	Lo (as Ryan Newman)		
2023	The Man in the White Van	Young mother		
2023	Exposure	Izzy		
2024	Reagan	Margaret "Mugs" Cleaver		

=== Television ===
Year	Title	Role	Notes	Ref(s)
2004	Blue's Clues	Joe's Friends	Episode: "Skidoo Adventure"	
2007	Hannah Montana	Young Miley Stewart	Episodes: "I am Hannah, Hear Me Croak", "Smells Like Teen Sellout"	
2007	The Suite Life of Zack & Cody	Camper Girl (uncredited)	Episode: "Graduation"	
2009–2012	Zeke and Luther	Ginger Falcone	Main role	
2010	Good Luck Charlie	Kit (as Ryan Newman)	Episode: "Kit and Kaboodle"	
2012–2015	See Dad Run	Emily Hobbs	Main role	
2013	Big Time Rush	Herself	Episode: "Big Time Dreams"	
2015	Sharknado 3: Oh Hell No!	Claudia Shepard	Television film	
2015–2017	The Thundermans	Allison	Recurring role (seasons 3–4)	
2016	Bad Sister	Zoe Brady	Television film	
2016	Sharknado: The 4th Awakens	Claudia Shepard	Television film	
2016	Paradise Run	Herself	Contestant; episode: "Thundermans in Paradise"	
2018	The Last Sharknado: It's About Time	Claudia Shepard	Television film	

=== Music videos ===
Year	Song	Artist	Notes	Ref(s)
2010	"Happy Universal Holidays"	Adam Hicks (feat. Ryan Newman)		
2010	"Summertime"	Adam Hicks and Daniel Curtis Lee		
2011	"If Earth Could Speak"	James Asher / Sandeep Raval		

== Awards and nominations ==
Year	Award	Category	Work	Result	Ref(s)
2007	Young Artist Award	Best Performance in a Feature Film – Age Ten or Younger	Cindy Collins on Zoom	Nominated	
2008	Young Artist Award	Best Performance in a TV series – Recurring Young Actress	Young Miley Stewart on Hannah Montana	Nominated	
2011	Young Artist Award	Best Performance in a TV series (Comedy or Drama) – Leading Young Actress	Ginger Falcone on Zeke and Luther	Won	
