= Third Man Out =

2005 gay-themed mystery film

- Written by: Mark Saltzman; Richard Stevenson
- Directed by: Ron Oliver
- Starring: Chad Allen; Sebastian Spence; Jack Wetherall; Woody Jeffreys; Sean Young
- Music by: Ronnie Way; Bill Buckingham
- Countries of origin: Canada; United States
- Original language: English

Production
- Running time: 98 minutes

Original release
- Release: 2005

Third Man Out is a 2005 gay-themed mystery film. It is the first film adaptation of a Richard Stevenson novel featuring fictional detective Donald Strachey.

== Plot ==
At the home of John Rutka and Eddie Santin, Rutka is apparently shot. Later, private eye Donald Strachey arrives at a hospital to meet with a client. While there, he sees his partner, Tim Callahan, escorting his boss, a prominent New York State senator who is there for a photo op with the comatose Catholic Bishop McFee. Santin reveals that the client is Rutka, whom Strachey despises for his activities outing prominent local closeted homophobes. Strachey initially declines the assignment, but later accepts after Rutka is attacked and offers a large retainer.

Rutka shows Strachey his files on outing targets, one of which is Bruno Slinger, a prominent state politician who has voted against gay rights. When a fire breaks out at Rutka's house, Strachey puts it out. As he investigates, Strachey becomes convinced that Rutka and Santin are staging the various attacks, quits the case, and returns the unused portion of the retainer. The next morning, a news program reports Rutka's death. When Santin indignantly calls him, Strachey apologizes, returns with Santin to retrieve Rutka's files for safekeeping, and retakes the case. Santin identifies three upcoming targets: Slinger, children's show host Ronnie Linklater, and an unidentified man.

Strachey finds a torn-off mudflap and initials for three persons Rutka paid off. Strachey tracks the first two to local hotel owners who spied on their guests for Rutka. They reveal that Slinger was sexually connected to Linklater and that Linklater had weekly sex with another man who possibly accidentally died. Strachey traces a license plate to Art Murphy, a used car dealer, who refuses to cooperate. The man who visited Rutka's hospital room attacks Callahan at their home. Strachey arrives in time to drive him away, but Callahan is hospitalized. The experience shakes Strachey enough to consider abandoning the case until Callahan, who has had a change of heart about Rutka, convinces him to continue.

Strachey interviews Linklater, but Linklater denies that either he or Slinger had any involvement in Rutka's death. Linklater refuses to identify the unknown man, but Strachey believes he survived. As Strachey leaves, the man who attacked Callahan ambushes him, knocking him unconscious. When he wakes, he is greeted by the man's boss, Slinger, who also denies involvement in Rutka's murder and demands that he hand over Rutka's file on him. Slinger allows Strachey to leave unharmed but tells him only that Linklater and Rutka were both involved in St. Michael's choir.

As Callahan is discharged, the couple comes across Art Murphy and his wife, visiting Bishop McFee. Callahan learns Murphy is McFee's brother-in-law and driver, and McFee is Linklater's injured lover. Callahan uses his seminary contacts to identify Father Morgan, the priest at St. Michael's when Rutka was in the choir. Strachey identifies Murphy's car, which is missing a mudflap, as the one used by McFee. Morgan is arrested for covering up McFee's sex crimes and Rutka's murder. At Rutka's funeral, Santin offers Strachey the remaining fee for his work. The name on Santin's proffered business card matches that of the final unidentified Rutka contact, David Resuto, the Rutka family's lawyer. Strachey asks Rutka's sister Ann why Resuto received such a large payoff, and she reluctantly explains that it was for a life insurance policy; Santin is the beneficiary.

Suspicious, Strachey follows Santin to an airport, only to find that Rutka is alive. Rutka explains that he faked his death, framed Father Morgan, and exposed McFee as a pedophile to use the life insurance money to fund cheap drugs for AIDS patients in Mexico. Strachey is outraged until Rutka reveals he was a victim of McFee's molestation. Strachey protests that Morgan will go to prison for a murder he did not commit, and Rutka agrees that Strachey can tell the authorities he is still alive. Strachey allows them to leave, and, later, Strachey and Callahan conclude that the world is not as black and white as they previously thought. As they toast their new perspective, they destroy a file Rutka kept on Strachey, who escaped controversy when his gay lover was made a scapegoat by the U.S. military.

== Cast ==
Actor	Role
Chad Allen	Donald Strachey
Sebastian Spence	Timmy Callahan
Jack Wetherall	John Rutka
Woody Jeffreys	Eddie Santin
Sean Young	Ann Rutka
April Telek	Alice Savage
John Moore	Bishop McFee
Alf Humphries	Father Morgan
P. Lynn Johnson	Senator Dianne Glassman
Guy Fauchon	Newspaper Photographer
James Michalopolous	Dark Glasses
Moneca Delain	Nurse
Kirsten Williamson	Meredith
David Palffy	Bruno Slinger
Colin Lawrence	Cole
Mary Belle McDonald	Eleanor
Anthony O'Clery	Redd Koontz
Daryl Shuttleworth	Detective Sean "Bub" Bailey
Andrew Moxham	Dark Figure #1
Warren Takeuchi	Dark Figure #2
Sean Carey	Ronnie Linklater
Claudine Grant	Newscaster
Matthew Rush	Dik Steele
Mark Acheson	Fake Dik Steele Male
Lisa Dahling	Fake Dik Steele Female
Nelson Wong	Kenny Kwon
Kevin Blatch	Nathan Zenck
Richard Cox	Howie Glade
Giuseppe Abbruzzese	Man In Video
Carrie Patershuck	Woman In Video
Kevin O'Grady	Man #2
Scott Swanson	Art Murphy
Sonja Bakker	Joan
Kwesi Ameyaw	Reporter #1
Nicola Crosbie	Reporter #2
Rob deLeeuw	Puppeteer
Sibel Thrasher	Diva Singer
Carl McDonald	Drag Queen

=== Continuity ===
This film reveals that before becoming a private investigator, Donald was in the armed services, but was forced out because of the ban on gay servicemembers. This subplot is explored further and in much more depth in the sequel, Shock to the System.

== Production notes ==
Although this was the first film adaptation of one of Richard Stevenson's books about the gay private eye, Donald Strachey, it was not the first of his novels to be published. It appears then that the order of the films differs from that of the books, as characters such as Detective Bub Bailey and Kenny Kwon are introduced to Strachey in this film, and he sees them again in On the Other Hand, Death and Ice Blues, even though the novels the latter two are adapted from took place chronologically before the book version of Third Man Out.

In addition, some minor details have been changed from the books. Since the internet was not widely known the year Third Man Out (the novel) was published, Queerscreed, which is the name of John Rutka's publication from which he outs prominent closeted homophobes, is something he passes out solely in print in the book version, while in the film it's renamed The Rutka Report and is also available on the web.
