= Chad Allen (actor) =

American actor and psychologist

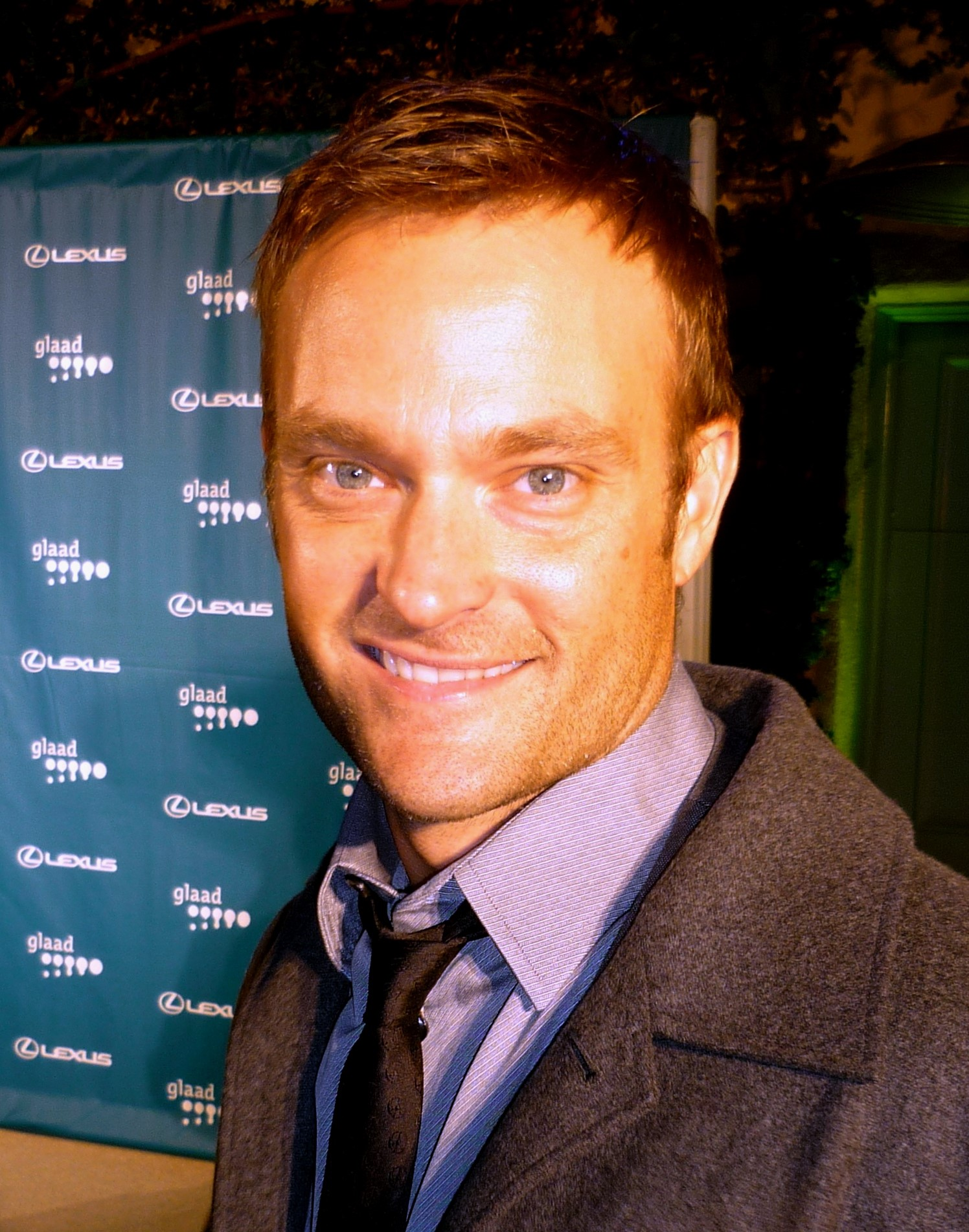
- Allen in 2009
- Born: Chad Allen Lazzari; June 5, 1974 (age 52); Cerritos, California, U.S.
- Education: University of California, Los Angeles; Antioch University New England
- Occupations: Actor, psychologist
- Years active: 1981–2015

Chad Allen (born Chad Allen Lazzari; June 5, 1974) is an American psychologist and retired actor. Having begun his career at the age of seven, Allen is a three-time Young Artist Award winner and GLAAD Media Award honoree. He was a teen idol during the late 1980s as David Witherspoon on the NBC family drama Our House and as Zach Nichols on the NBC sitcom My Two Dads. Allen later moved on to a career in adult roles, starring as Matthew Cooper on the CBS western drama Dr. Quinn, Medicine Woman. He announced his retirement from acting in April 2015.

== Early life ==
Allen was born Chad Allen Lazzari on June 5, 1974 in Cerritos, California. He grew up in Artesia. Allen has a twin sister named Charity and a brother named Steve Lazzari who works for Union Pacific Railroad. He is of predominantly Italian origin, with a "dose" of German ancestry. Allen has stated that he was raised in a "strict" Roman Catholic household and regards himself as being a "deeply spiritual person" because of his upbringing. He attended St. John Bosco High School in Bellflower, California.

== Career ==
Allen guest-starred on several prime time series, including an early episode of Airwolf for which he was nominated as "Best Young Actor: Guest in a Series" at the 6th Youth in Film Awards and St. Elsewhere, in which he played autistic child Tommy Westphall (1983–88). The series' final episode, "The Last One", ends with the indication that all of its storylines occurred in Tommy's imagination. In 1983, he appeared on Cutter to Houston, playing "a kid who got hurt and had to be given mouth-to-mouth and carried to the waiting chopper by Dr. Hal Wexler (Alec Baldwin)". "I thought it was the greatest job I had ever gotten," he later stated. Allen's first regular role was as David Witherspoon on Our House (1986–88).

On November 5 of that year, the three-part mini series Straight Up premiered, where he co-starred with Louis Gossett Jr. In it Allen plays a teen tempted by drugs, while Gossett plays a magical character who operates the "fate elevator", so that each time Allen is tempted by a substance Gossett takes him on an elevator ride which shows the consequence of that substance.

In 1989–90, he had a recurring role as Zach in My Two Dads. Allen's next contract role was Matthew Cooper in Dr. Quinn, Medicine Woman alongside Jane Seymour (1993–98). During the final season of his run on St. Elsewhere, Allen was teamed with his sister Charity Allen on an episode of NBC's Saturday morning children's game show I'm Telling!.

Starting with Third Man Out (2005), Allen starred as Donald Strachey, a gay private detective in a monogamous relationship, in a series of television movies for the here! network based on novels by Richard Stevenson. The sequel, Shock to the System (2006), was followed by On the Other Hand, Death (2008) and Ice Blues (2008). Allen noted that Strachey was the first gay character he had ever played outside of theater and that, though his career is "different" since coming out, he finds it "more interesting and fun for me than it has ever been."

When Allen was cast as real-life Christian missionary Nate Saint in the docudrama End of the Spear (2006) some conservative Christians lashed out at producers for casting an openly gay man in the role.

In 2007, Allen starred in the film Save Me. Developed and produced by Allen, the film was directed by Robert Cary and written by Robert Desiderio. Save Me, a film exploring the ex-gay movement, premiered at the 2007 Sundance Film Festival and was later picked up for distribution by independent studio First Run Features.

From June through August 2008, Allen appeared with Valerie Harper in Looped, a play based on an afternoon looping session with Tallulah Bankhead for the film Die! Die! My Darling!, at the Pasadena Playhouse in Pasadena, California.

Starting on September 23, 2008, Allen portrayed the love interest of Dr. Kyle Julian for five episodes of the prime time SOAPnet serial General Hospital: Night Shift, a spin-off of the ABC Daytime soap opera General Hospital.

In April 2015, Allen confirmed in a YouTube video that he had quit his acting career to become a clinical psychologist.

== Personal life ==
In 1996, at age 21, Allen was outed as gay when the US tabloid The Globe published photos of him kissing another man in a hot tub at a party. The photos were sold by someone who claimed to be a friend of the couple. Allen has since become an activist for the LGBT community in addition to his continuing acting and producing career. On January 17, 2006, Allen appeared on CNN's Larry King Live with then-mayor of San Francisco Gavin Newsom to represent his viewpoint in a debate over same-sex marriage. Allen thanked Newsom for his attempts to legalize same-sex marriage in the city. Allen has been featured in The Advocate magazine multiple times and has appeared on three of its covers.

In November 2006, The Los Angeles Daily News wrote in passing that Allen's partner, Jeremy Glazer, was also in the film Save Me. In a September 2008 interview with Out.com, Allen stated that he was currently in a three-year relationship and had been sober for eight years. In October 2008, AfterElton.com stated his boyfriend to be Glazer. In May 2009, Allen was the recipient of a GLAAD Media Award: the Davidson/Valentini Award. In his acceptance speech he said he had met Glazer, his partner, exactly four years earlier. They broke up in 2015.

Allen graduated from the University of California, Los Angeles in June 2015 with a bachelor of arts in psychology. He graduated from the Psy.D. program in clinical psychology at Antioch University New England in 2020.

== Filmography ==
Year	Title	Role	Notes
1981	Simon & Simon	Boy	Episode: "A Recipe for Disaster"
1983–1988	St. Elsewhere	Tommy Westphall	17 episodes: Recurring Role
1984	Airwolf	Ho Minh Truong	Episode: "Daddy's Gone a Hunt'n"
1985	Matt Houston	Patrick	Episode: "The Nightmare Man"
1985	Not My Kid	Bobby	Television movie
1985	The Bad Seed	Mark Daigler	Television movie
1985	Hotel	Bobby Cowley	Episode: "Sleeping Dogs"
1985	A Death in California	Glenn	2 episodes
1985	Code of Vengeance	A.J. Flowers	Episode: "Code of Vengeance"
1985	The New Leave It to Beaver	Doug Williams	2 episodes
1985–1986	Webster	Rob Whitaker	7 episodes
1985–1988	Punky Brewster	Conrad; Brian	2 episodes
1986	Happy New Year, Charlie Brown!	Charlie Brown	Voice role
1986	The Magical World of Disney	Coop	Episode "Help Wanted: Kids"
1986	TerrorVision	Sherman Putterman	Theatrical Release
1986–1988	Our House	David Witherspoon	46 episodes: Main Role
1987	Tales from the Darkside	Sandy	Episode: "The Milkman Cometh"
1988	I'm Telling!	Celebrity Guest Contestant	Teamed with his sister, Charity Allen
1988	Straight Up	Ben	2 episodes
1988	Highway to Heaven	Ricky Diller	Episode: "The Whole Nine Yards"
1988	Hunter	Danny Sanderson	Episode: "Heir of Neglect"
1989–1990	My Two Dads	Zach Nichols	26 episodes: Main Role
1990	Camp Cucamonga	Frankie Calloway	Television movie
1990	Star Trek: The Next Generation	Jono/Jeremiah Rossa	Episode: "Suddenly Human"
1991	The Wonder Years	Brad Patterson	Episode: "The Yearbook"
1991	DEA	Michael Stadler	2 episodes
1991	Murder in New Hampshire: The Pamela Wojas Smart Story	William Flynn	Television movie
1992	ABC Weekend Special	Sean	Episode: "Choose Your Own Adventure: The Case of the Silk King"
1993	Praying Mantis	Bobby McAndrews	
1993	In the Heat of the Night	Matt Skinner	Episode: "Every Man's Family"
1993–1998	Dr. Quinn, Medicine Woman	Matthew Cooper	146 episodes: Main Role
1998	The Love Boat: The Next Wave	Pete Dougherty	Episode: "How Long Has This Been Going On?"
1999	Total Recall 2070	Eddie Miller	Episode: "First Wave"
1999 & 2004	NYPD Blue	Tommy Ibarra; Kyle Tanner	2 episodes
2001	What Matters Most	Lucas Warner	
2001	A Mother's Testimony	Kenny Carlson	
2001	Do You Wanna Know a Secret?	Brad Adams/Bradley Clayton	
2002	Sexy	Voice 1	
2002	Getting Out	Steve	
2003	Paris	Jason Bartok	
2004	Downtown: A Street Tale	Hunter	
2005	Cold Case	Monty Fineman 1985	Episode: "Kensington"
2005	Third Man Out	Donald Strachey	
2005	Charmed	Emrick	Episode: "Hulkus Pocus"
2005	End of the Spear	Nate Saint/Steve Saint	
2006	The Pool 2	Mark Casati	
2006	Criminal Minds	Jackson Cally	Episode: "The Tribe"
2006	Shock to the System	Donald Strachey	
2007	Save Me	Mark	
2007	Terra	Terrian Scientist	Voice
2008	On the Other Hand, Death	Donald Strachey	
2008	Ice Blues	Donald Strachey	
2008	CSI: Miami	Barry/Stan Carlyle	Episode: "Bombshell"
2008	General Hospital: Night Shift	Eric Whitlow	5 episodes
2009	Hollywood, je t'aime	Ross	
2009	Fright Flick	Brock	
2010	Spork	Loogie	
2010	Dexter	Lance Robinson	Episode: "Everything is Illumenated"
2010	For Better or for Worse		
2012	Hollywood to Dollywood	Himself	
