= Ice Blues =

- Written by: Ron McGee
- Directed by: Ron Oliver
- Starring: Chad Allen; Sebastian Spence; Brittney Wilson; Sebastien Roberts; Nelson Wong; Daryl Shuttleworth; Sherry Miller
- Countries of origin: Canada; United States
- Original language: English

Production
- Producer: James Shavick
- Cinematography: C. Kim Miles
- Editor: Tony Dean Smith
- Production company: Shavick Entertainment

Original release
- Network: Super Channel
- Release: June 2008
- Network: Here TV
- Release: September 5, 2008

Ice Blues is a 2008 gay-themed mystery television film starring Chad Allen and Sebastian Spence, and directed by Emmy-nominated Canadian-born director Ron Oliver. featuring fictional detective Donald Strachey. It is the third adaptation of a Richard Stevenson novel, though it was the fourth to be released.

Ice Blues was screened in select markets in Canada in the summer of 2008 on the pay station Super Channel, but did not premiere in the United States until September 5, 2008 on here! TV network. The film was nominated for the GLAAD Media Award for Outstanding TV Movie or Limited Series.

== Cast ==
Actor	Role
Chad Allen	Donald Strachey
Sebastian Spence	Timmy Callahan
Nelson Wong	Kenny Kwon
Daryl Shuttleworth	Detective "Bub" Bailey
Brittney Wilson	Lilah / Amy
Spencer Maybee	Eric Lenigan
Myron Natwick	Brian Lenigan
Sebastien Roberts	Frank Zaillian
Jason Poulsen	Jake Lenigan
Ulla Friis	Kelly
Sherry Miller	Joan Lenigan
Adrian Holmes	Somerville
P. Lynn Johnson	Senator Lauren Platt
Taras Kostyuk	Darwin
Christian Tessier	Skopes
Gordon Tipple	Arnie Targeson
Alfonso Quijada	Director
Michael Jonsson	Officer Morris
Chantal Forde	Annette
Reese Alexander	Police Officer
Joe Dall'Antonia	Pilot

== Production notes ==
=== Release order ===
According to Ken Clark, the webmaster of fan site Chad Allen Online, there were a couple of reasons that On the Other Hand, Death was released before Ice Blues. One was script quality; the producers felt that the adaptation of the novel needed substantial revisions to the overall plot. The other was the desired weather conditions for shooting, as Ice Blues was meant to take place in winter, so plans to shoot in May 2007 were shelved and filming was postponed until December of that year or the winter season of 2008.
