= Donald Strachey =

- Chad Allen as Donald Strachey in the 2005 TV movie Third Man Out.
- First appearance: Death Trick (novel); Third Man Out (film)
- Created by: Richard Stevenson
- Portrayed by: Chad Allen

In-universe information
- Gender: Male
- Occupation: Private investigator
- Spouse: Timothy Callahan
- Nationality: American

Donald "Don" Strachey is a fictional character who appears in novels by mystery writer Richard Stevenson.

Strachey, a gay man, lives in Albany, New York, with his partner Timothy Callahan. Don's clients often feel that his sexual orientation gives him an edge when called upon to investigate cases that involve Albany's gay community.

Shavick Entertainment has adapted four of the Donald Strachey books into films for the LGBT television network Here!. The films have starred gay actor Chad Allen as Strachey.

== Supporting characters ==
=== Timothy Callahan ===
Timothy "Tim" Callahan is a legislative aide to a New York state senator, and Strachey's life partner. He is the only character besides Strachey to have appeared in all the novels and the films, in the latter of which he is portrayed by actor Sebastian Spence. In Ice Blues, Tim recalls how his sister Kelly was forced out of their home because of an estrangement between her and their parents. Tim and Kelly hadn't talked for years because of this, but at the end of the film, Donald manages to use his P.I. abilities to locate her, reuniting them.

=== Detective Sean 'Bub' Bailey ===
Detective Bailey meets Strachey in Third Man Out, wherein he tries to convince Strachey to persuade gay rights activist John Rutka to leave Albany. In Ice Blues, Bub is revealed to have had an affair with Joan Lenigan after she killed her husband. He is portrayed in the films by Daryl Shuttleworth. The character in the novels most analogous to him is Detective Sergeant Ned Bowman, but it is arguable whether they can be considered "the same" due to the substantial differences between the two characters.

=== Kenny Kwon ===
An original character developed for the films, Kenny Kwon is played by Nelson Wong. Strachey first meets him at the Parmalee Plaza Hotel, and trashes Kwon's boss's office while working on a case to find out who might have killed Rutka. In Shock to the System, Kwon tracks down Strachey and reveals that he was fired shortly after that incident, and lays the blame at Strachey's feet. Donald agrees to give him a job as Strachey Investigations' receptionist. In On the Other Hand, Death, Kenny reveals that he is taking class to get a P.I. license of his own, and Strachey sends him out to tail a corrupt cop so he can fulfill the field experience requirements to obtain it.

== Donald Strachey mysteries ==
- Stevenson, Richard (1981), Death Trick, Los Angeles, CA: Alyson Publications, ISBN 1-55583-387-X, OCLC 36021089
- Stevenson, Richard (1984), On the Other Hand, Death, New York: Penguin Books, ISBN 0-14-008319-7, OCLC 12052183
- Stevenson, Richard (1986), Ice Blues, New York: St. Martin's Press, ISBN 0-312-40379-8, OCLC 12722011
- Stevenson, Richard (1992), Third Man Out, New York: St. Martin's Press, ISBN 0-312-07110-8, OCLC 24667956
- Stevenson, Richard (1995), A Shock to the System, New York: St. Martin's Press, ISBN 0-312-13610-2, OCLC 32856586
- Stevenson, Richard (1996), Chain of Fools, New York: St. Martin's Press, ISBN 0-312-14563-2, OCLC 34912753
- Stevenson, Richard (1998), Strachey's Folly, New York: St. Martin's Press, ISBN 0-312-18669-X, OCLC 38286505
- Stevenson, Richard (2003), Tongue Tied, New York: St. Martin's Minotaur, ISBN 0-312-30974-0, OCLC 223305701
- Stevenson, Richard (2008), Death Vows, Albion, New York: MLR Press, ISBN 978-1-934531-33-4, OCLC 233637323
- Stevenson, Richard (September 2009), The 38 Million Dollar Smile, Albion, New York: MLR Press, ISBN 978-1-60820-013-9, OCLC 427868303
- Stevenson, Richard (2010), Cockeyed, Albion, New York: MLR Press, ISBN 978-1-60820-096-2, OCLC 663950797
- Stevenson, Richard (2011), Red White Black And Blue, Albion, New York: MLR Press, ISBN 978-1-60820-362-8, OCLC 758871656
- Stevenson, Richard (2012), The Last Thing I Saw, Albion, New York: MLR Press, ISBN 978-1-60820-706-0
- Stevenson, Richard (2015), Why Stop at Vengeance, Albion, New York: MLR Press, ISBN 978-1-60820-977-4
- Stevenson, Richard (2016), www.dropdead, Albion, New York: MLR Press, ISBN 978-1-94477-042-6
- Stevenson, Richard (2019), Killer Reunion, Albion, New York: MLR Press, ISBN 978-1-64122-244-0

== Films ==
- Third Man Out (2005)
- Shock to the System (2006)
- On the Other Hand, Death (2008)
- Ice Blues (2008)
