= Awakening the Zodiac =

- Directed by: Jonathan Wright
- Written by: Jennifer Archer; Mike Horrigan; Jonathan Wright
- Produced by: Michael Baker; Jeff Sackman
- Starring: Shane West; Leslie Bibb
- Cinematography: Boris Mojsovski
- Edited by: Mark Arcieri
- Music by: Mark Korven
- Production companies: Bunk 11 Pictures; TAJJ Media
- Distributed by: Sony Pictures Worldwide Acquisitions; Vertical Entertainment
- Release date: 9 June 2017 (United States)
- Running time: 100 minutes
- Country: Canada
- Language: English

Awakening the Zodiac is a 2017 Canadian mystery crime drama film directed by Jonathan Wright and starring Shane West and Leslie Bibb.

== Premise ==
A couple buy a storage unit, finding evidence of the Zodiac Killer and try to solve the case.

== Cast ==
- Shane West as Mick Branson
- Leslie Bibb as Zoe Branson
- Matt Craven as Harvey
- Kenneth Welsh as Ben
- Nicholas Campbell as Ray
- Stephen McHattie as "Zodiac"
- John Bregar as Adam
- Eva Link as Lula
- Jennie Esnard as Tina
- Douglas Kidd as Officer
- Sandra Wilson as Front Desk Woman

== Production ==
Although the film is set in Virginia, the film was shot in Ontario, especially in Almonte, outside of Ottawa.

== Reception ==
The film has 45% rating on Rotten Tomatoes. Barry Hertz of The Globe and Mail awarded the film one star out of four.
