= Volition (film) =

Canadian science fiction thriller film

- Directed by: Tony Dean Smith
- Written by: Tony Dean Smith; Ryan W. Smith
- Produced by: Tony Dean Smith; Ryan W. Smith
- Starring: Adrian Glynn McMorran; Magda Apanowicz; John Cassini; Frank Cassini; Aleks Paunovic; Bill Marchant
- Cinematography: Byron Kopman
- Edited by: Tony Dean Smith
- Music by: Matthew Rogers
- Production companies: Paly Productions; Smith Brothers Film Company
- Distributed by: Giant Pictures; Levelfilm
- Release date: March 15, 2019
- Running time: 91 minutes
- Country: Canada
- Language: English

Volition is a 2019 Canadian science fiction thriller film written by Tony and Ryan W. Smith and directed by Tony Dean Smith. The film stars Adrian Glynn McMorran, Magda Apanowicz, John Cassini, Frank Cassini, Aleks Paunovic, and Bill Marchant. The film premiered at the 2019 Philip K. Dick Science Fiction Film Festival.

== Plot ==
Jimmy is a reformed ex-criminal living a low-key existence. He uses his gift of clairvoyance to make small bets on sports matches. While walking home, he spots two men harassing a woman in an alley and he picks a fight with them. Though they beat him up and flee, the woman is flattered by his chivalry and introduces herself as Angela. Jimmy has a vision of Angela showing up at his apartment with a case of beer, laughing and flirting together. He tells her where he lives if she'd ever like to visit.

Sal, an old friend recently released from jail, reacquaints Jimmy with their mutual friend, drug trafficker Ray. Ray wants Jimmy to fence millions of dollars in stolen diamonds in exchange for a cut. Jimmy hesitates, but he sees a vision of himself accepting the deal. Believing he cannot change the future no matter what choice he makes, he agrees to take the diamonds.

Angela shows up at his apartment with beer, just as Jimmy saw. As they talk, he shares that his mother died when he was young and he is no longer in touch with his foster dad; Angela says she's estranged from her parents as well.

Meanwhile, Sal and his goon Terry plan to double-cross Ray and steal the diamonds for themselves. They break into Jimmy's apartment as Jimmy and Angela flee in her car. Terrified, Angela demands to know what's going on. Jimmy explains his clairvoyance and says he had a vision of his mother's death in a car accident when he was a child. Since then, he's felt hopeless and believes he has no free will as his future is already pre-planned. Jimmy panics when he has a vision of himself being killed.

Jimmy has a vision of Elliot, his quantum physicist foster dad. Jimmy and Angela drive to Elliot's but are interrupted when Sal, Ray, and Terry break into Elliot's house and Sal accuses of Jimmy of double-crossing them. Ray and Terry quietly threaten Jimmy not to expose their plot. A scuffle ensues and Ray fatally shoots Angela. Hiding in a closet, Elliot injects Jimmy with a syringe and Jimmy passes out.

Jimmy wakes in the same closet but the house, and Elliot, look different. Elliot explains that Jimmy has been injected with a time travel drug and the year is now 1994. Elliot explains that the ability to travel through time and return to the present is what enables his clairvoyance. With the ability to time travel, Jimmy is determined to return to the present, refuse the diamond deal, and save Angela. He takes another dose and returns to the present day. He manages to intercept Sal and Terry's robbery and takes the diamonds to Elliot's. He hides in the bushes as he sees a second Jimmy arrive. The original Jimmy witnesses the fight and watches Ray shoot Angela again. An unknown assailant shoots original Jimmy. With his last breath, he injects himself with another dose of the time travel drug. Jimmy starts to "fragment" as the mental and physical exhaustion of time travel take a toll on him. He sees himself as the thug harassing Angela and the drunk guy he bumped into on the street earlier that day.

Back at Elliot's house one more time, Jimmy fights with Terry in the backyard and Terry's gun accidentally goes off, shooting the version of him in the bushes. Jimmy enters the house and is shot by Ray, fulfilling his earlier vision. As he's bleeding out, he tells Ray about the double-crossing plot. Terry kills Ray and flees with Sal.

Jimmy travels back in time and appears in Elliot's lab years before they meet. Confused but willing to help this dying stranger, Elliot starts treating him and notices the silver liquid of the time travel drug leaking out of his body. Elliot realizes that in the future, he has successfully perfected the time travel drug he's currently working on. Jimmy tells Elliot to go to the foster home and adopt James Odin—his younger self.

A version of Jimmy witnesses the fight at Elliot's home in the present day, but in this timeline, Angela is shot in the shoulder instead of the chest. He rushes over to her, knowing he has saved her life and he has the ability to change the future with his choices.

== See also ==
- List of films featuring time loops
