= Leah Gibson =

Canadian actress

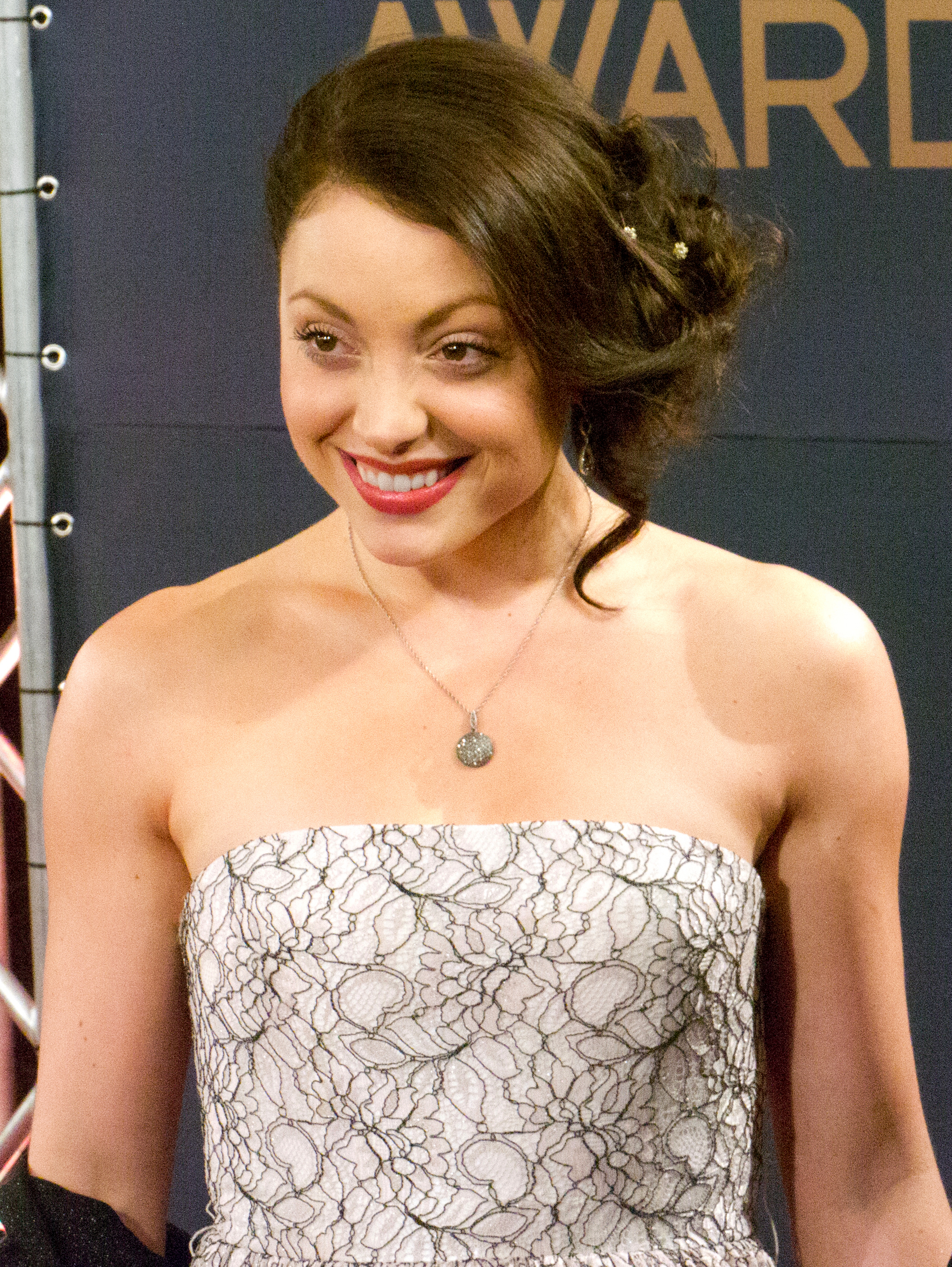
- Gibson at the 2012 32nd Genie Awards
- Born: Leah Diane Gibson; January 3, 1985 (age 41); Victoria, British Columbia, Canada
- Occupation: Actress
- Years active: 2007–present

Leah Diane Gibson is a Canadian actress.

== Early life ==
Leah Gibson was born in Victoria, British Columbia. She has a twin sister named Erin. She began dancing at the age of four, which led to training and performance in vocational interests, such as ballet and many forms of jazz. In early years of dancing and singing, she discovered musical theatre. She transferred to a high school that specialized in fine arts, maintaining honor-roll grades and graduating at the top of her class.

Gibson studied psychology at the University of Victoria and was among the select few who were asked to study under the UVic honours program. She was simultaneously cast in her first professional theatre production and withdrew from university. The touring company lost its funding within two months, resulting in the show being cancelled. Gibson consequently moved to Vancouver in pursuit of a career in film acting.

== Career ==
In 2007, Gibson began her acting career in television, appearing on Psych, in the television film Second Sight, and on the miniseries Tin Man. She also played Penelope in Odysseus: Voyage to the Underworld (2008). Gibson's very first lead role in a feature film, namely Amy Singer in The Devil's Ground (2009), was booked within six months of signing an agent. That same year, she portrayed the supporting role of Silhouette's Girlfriend in Zack Snyder's Watchmen, as well as a role in Happy to Be Here (2009). She continued her television career in Stranger with My Face (2009), and appeared as the character Hannah in two episodes of Riese (2009).

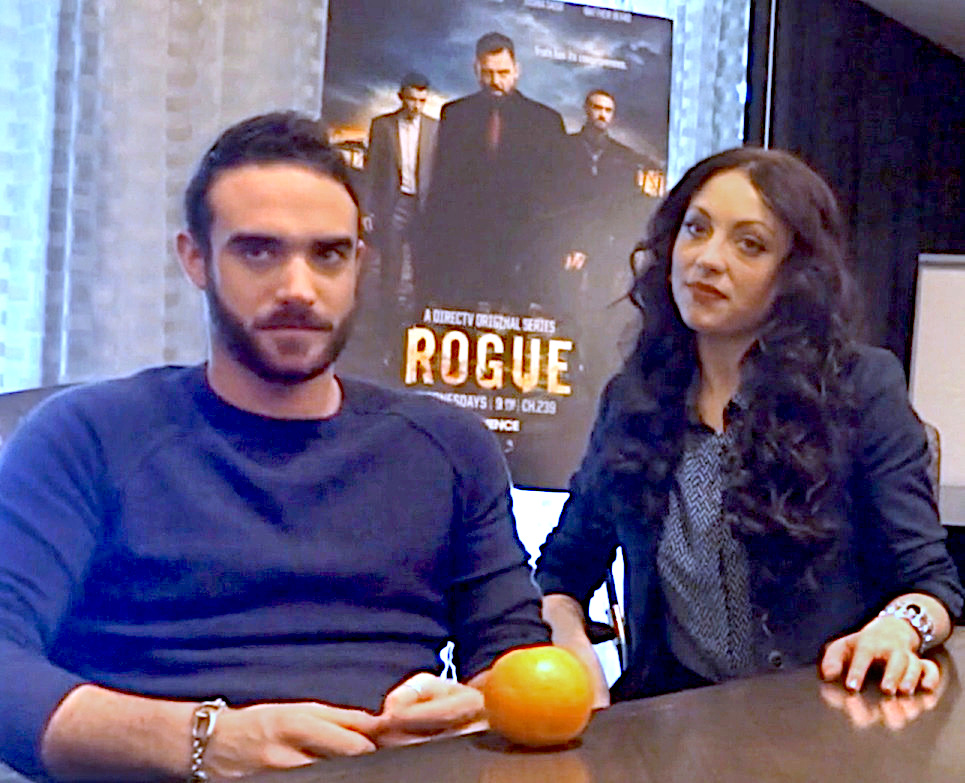
Gibson with Rogue "screen husband" Joshua Sasse (2013)

In 2010, Gibson played Nettie in The Twilight Saga: Eclipse, and was also attached to the cast of A Night for Dying Tigers. From 2010 to 2011, she starred in the two short films The Metal Box (2010) and The Fence (2011). In 2010, she also played a minor character in the TV movie called Betwixt. Gibson portrayed the avatar Emmanuelle on Caprica (2010), which accredited three episodes. She then made a guest appearance as Palomino on Supernatural in the episode "Two Minutes to Midnight". In 2011, she was credited in Rise of the Planet of the Apes as playing Alyssa Williams. Subsequent television credits included He Loves Me (2011) and Soldiers of the Apocalypse (2011). She played supporting characters in Kill for Me (2013) as Natalie Ross, Indie Jonesing (2012) as Gina, and lead role in the short film Leave Us Alone (2012). In the course of five episodes, she has played Candi Lussier in a recurring role on Arctic Air (2012–2013). Gibson's work for the rest of 2012 consisted of episodes on The True Heroines, and the unsold pilot for American Housewife. In 2013 she joined the cast for the first season of Rogue.

== Filmography ==
Key
†	Denotes films that have not yet been released

Film roles
Year	Title	Role	Notes
2008	Odysseus: Voyage to the Underworld	Penelope	
2009	The Devil's Ground	Amy Singer	
2009	Watchmen	Silhouette's Girlfriend	
2009	Happy to Be Here	Barbara	
2010	The Metal Box	Anna	Short film
2010	The Twilight Saga: Eclipse	Nettie	
2010	A Night for Dying Tigers	Carly	
2011	The Fence	Autumn	Short film
2011	Rise of the Planet of the Apes	Alyssa Williams	
2012	Indie Jonesing	Gina	
2013	Kill for Me	Natalie Ross	
2013	Crook	Tricky	
2013	Leave Us Alone	Sam	Short film
2014	What an Idiot	Grace	
2016	Lost Solace	Betty	
~~2022~~	~~Gutshot~~	~~Kate~~	~~canceled project~~
2023	Mercy	Michelle	
2024	The Painter	Lucy	
2024	Winner	Jennifer Solari	

Television roles
Year	Title	Role	Notes
2007	Psych	Slut	1 episode
2007	Second Sight	Nicole Smittz	TV movie
2007	Tin Man	Twister Dancer	Miniseries
2009	Stranger with My Face	Lia's Nurse	TV movie
2009	Riese	Hannah	2 episodes
2010	Betwixt	Emily	TV movie
2010	Caprica	Emmanuelle	3 episodes
2010	Supernatural	Palomino	1 episode
2011	He Loves Me	Sophie Hawkins	TV movie
2011	Soldiers of the Apocalypse	Ella Sticks	1 episode
2012–13	Arctic Air	Candi Lussier	5 episodes
2012	The True Heroines	Ruby Fitzgerald	2 episodes
2012	Dark Universe	Chloe Banks	Miniseries
2012	American Housewife	n/a	Unsold pilot
2013	Eve of Destruction	Chloe Banks	Miniseries
2013–2014	Rogue	Cathy Laszlo	Main cast (season 1), guest (1 episode, season 2)
2014	Once Upon a Time in Wonderland	Nyx	3 episodes
2015	The Returned	Lucy McCabe	Recurring role
2015	Seeds of Yesterday	Melodie	TV movie
2015	The Christmas Note	Melissa McCreary	TV movie
2016	The 100	Gina Martin	2 episodes
2016–17	Shut Eye	Sylvia Haverford	7 episodes
2018	Jessica Jones	Inez Green	Main cast (season 2)
2020	Manifest	Tamara	Recurring role (season 2)
2021	Batwoman	Tatiana/The Whisper	Recurring role (season 2)
2024	Earth Abides	Ann	Episode: "Alone"
2025	Tracker	Bruna Pryor	Season 3 Episode 15: "No Good Deed"

== Awards and nominations ==
Year	Award	Category	Work	Result	Ref
2017	Leo Awards	Best Supporting Performance by a Female in a Motion Picture	Lost Solace	Won	
