= Shock to the System (2006 film) =

2006 Canadian-American film

- Written by: Ron McGee; Richard Stevenson
- Directed by: Ron Oliver
- Starring: Chad Allen; Sebastian Spence; Michael Woods; Daryl Shuttleworth; Morgan Fairchild
- Countries of origin: Canada; United States
- Original language: English

Production
- Running time: 91 minutes
- Production companies: Shavick Entertainment; Insight Film Studios here! Films

Original release
- Release: 2006

Related
- Third Man Out; On the Other Hand, Death

Shock to the System is a 2006 gay-themed mystery film. It is the second film adaptation of a Richard Stevenson novel featuring fictional detective Donald Strachey. The film premiered at the 2006 Outfest film festival before going into rotation on the here! television network.

== Plot ==
Late one night, Donald Strachey is meeting a new client in a dark alley—one Paul Hale. Hale is very nervous, and before Strachey can calm what seems like paranoia, an incoming van approaches. Hale hands the private eye a $5,000 check for a retainer just before the speeding van separates the two. The next night, however, Paul Hale turns up dead. Both the coroner and Detective Bailey rule his death a suicide due to apparent evidence of alcohol and drugs nearby his body and in his bloodstream, but neither Donald nor Paul's mother are convinced of this. Phyllis Hale believes Paul was murdered. Strachey is determined to find out the truth about Paul's death. On the way to work the next morning, Strachey accosts someone who he believes is breaking into his office, but it turns out to be Kenny Kwon, who was fired during a confrontation between Strachey and his boss Nathan Zenck during a prior case. Kenny convinces Donald to hire him as Strachey Investigations' new office manager.

Strachey's lover Timmy Callahan is able to provide the firm a lead on Paul Hale—before he died, he was the spokesman for the Phoenix Foundation, which practices ex-gay conversion therapy. Strachey goes undercover into the Foundation as "Kyle". In his undercover persona, the detective introduces himself to Dr. Trevor Cornell, the Foundation's director. "Kyle" tells Cornell a story about a former soldier who was discharged for being gay—a story Strachey draws upon from his own past in his bid to be believable as an aspiring ex-gay.

Cornell isn't the only one who believes that being gay is a choice determined only by how much willpower a person exerts to "change". Phyllis, in her quest to blame homosexuals for Paul's death, deflects responsibility towards an openly gay friend of his from college, Larry Phelps, whom she suggests might have killed him for his attempts to become straight. Donald attempts to talk to Larry, but he assumes Strachey is dangerous. The P.I. gives chase, but Phelps manages to elude him. Then called to the police station, he is given a copy of the autopsy report by Bailey. It turns out the drugs found in Paul Hale's system were phenelzine, even though the bottles of pills found around his body contained Xanax. Hale didn't have a prescription for either drug, but Bailey won't investigate where Paul got the drugs, as he refuses to believe it was anything other than suicide.

Later, "Kyle" goes to a conversion therapy group, meeting the other participants in the ex-gay program. Among them are Grey, an attractive athletic type that is in a heterosexual marriage with a child, and Katie, who says she's working on being less tomboyish and was even engaged to Paul Hale. The longer "Kyle" spends time with Trevor and the recipients of his therapy, the more details he gets about the estrangement between them and Paul that occurred shortly before his death, but the undercover assignment takes its toll on Strachey's confidence in his openly gay identity, particularly during "Kyle"'s individual sessions with Cornell. Finally, in one session Strachey explodes into a confrontational tone, blowing his cover. Before Donald cuts ties with the ex-gays for good, Grey gives him two things—a DVD that will shed light on Paul's murder and an offer of extramarital sex. Strachey accepts the former, but declines the latter with great difficulty and mixed emotions.

At the office, Donald watches the DVD, which features a recording of Paul describing in vague terms what his experiences with the Phoenix Foundation did to change him—but not in the way he expected. Strachey is able to determine that Larry Phelps was the one who recorded Paul's appearance on the DVD, and knows whatever Paul did. Strachey tracks Larry down and convinces him that he means him no harm, and is not associated with the Phoenix Foundation. Larry informs Strachey that he and Paul secretly taped many of Cornell's individual sessions with his patients, but before he is able to tell Strachey everything he knows, an unknown assailant murders Phelps.

At home, Donald's conversations with Timmy become strained. Even broken away from Cornell's harmful messages, his influences as "Kyle" still weigh heavy in his heart, making him doubtful of what kind of future and possibilities an openly gay person can have in mainstream society, even implying to Timmy that he feels "trapped" in their relationship. Finally, one evening, Donald breaks down and tells Timmy about his past in the army and how he and his fellow soldier and lover of 4 months—Kyle Griffin—were discovered during a moment of intimacy. In the course of the investigation, Strachey caved to the pressure his military superiors were putting on him and told them the truth, something that devastated Kyle and their relationship. Donald confesses that the day they were both discharged, Kyle committed suicide.

The next morning, Cornell is taken into custody and charged with Larry Phelps' murder—because of evidence so convenient for an arrest warrant and open and shut prosecution, that Tim and Don are convinced that Cornell is being framed. With Trevor's reluctant blessing, Strachey convinces his wife Lynn to let him help her clear her husband of the serious charges he's facing. Strachey discovers a hidden camera in Cornell's office that transmitted movie files to a nearby computer in another room, which they uncover and then find out the truth. Katie is not a lesbian and has been sexually involved with Cornell, especially during their individual sessions, and it was she that put a lethal mix of phenelzine in Paul Hale's bourbon the night of his death, murdering both him and Larry Phelps. Katie turns up at the Foundation, holding both Strachey and Lynn Cornell at gunpoint, but he manages to disarm her. Cornell is freed, at the expense of his relationship with not only the now clearly insane Katie, but also his wife, and his program as well. Having nothing else to lose, Cornell tells Strachey why he was hired by Paul. He was hoping that the P.I. could track down Paul's father, who like his son, was gay, having been discovered by Paul's mother with another man, and facing Phyllis' intense disapproval. Strachey makes Phyllis realize how much damage her homophobia has caused her entire family, and he can now declare this case closed.

== Cast ==
Actor	Role
Chad Allen	Donald Strachey
Sebastian Spence	Timmy Callahan
Michael Woods	Dr. Trevor Cornell
Daryl Shuttleworth	Detective "Bub" Bailey
Morgan Fairchild	Phyllis Hale
Anne Marie DeLuise	Lynn Cornell
Rikki Gagne	Katey Simmons
Stephen Huszar	Grey
Nelson Wong	Kenny Kwon
Ryan Kennedy	Walter
Jeffrey Bowyer-Chapman	Levon
Shawn Roberts	Larry Phelps
Gerry Morton	Jefferson Lewis
Morgan Brayton	Hannah
Leanne Adachi	Dr. Sung
Jared Keeso	Paul Hale
Shawn Reis	Detective Stenski
Robert Kaiser	Tobias
Giles Panton	Bartender
Levi James	Clark
Dany Papineau	Kyle
Darrin Maharaj	Reporter
Sibel Thrasher	Lounge Singer
Joshua Dave Tynchuh	Naked Jock 1
Jon Johnson	Naked Jock 2

=== Continuity ===
The film continues the subplot that explores Strachey's past in the armed services, started in Third Man Out.
