= Odysseus and the Isle of the Mists =

- Promotional poster
- Directed by: Terry Ingram
- Written by: Brook Durham; Kevin Leeson
- Produced by: Jamie Goehring; Kirk Shaw
- Starring: Arnold Vosloo; Steve Bacic; J. R. Bourne; Randal Edwards
- Cinematography: C. Kim Miles
- Edited by: Gordon Williams
- Music by: Michael Richard Plowman
- Production company: Plinyminor
- Distributed by: Omni Releasing
- Release date: February 15, 2008 (United States)
- Running time: 92 minutes
- Countries: United Kingdom; Romania; Canada
- Language: English

Odysseus and the Isle of the Mists is a 2008 feature film directed by Terry Ingram and produced by Plinyminor in association with the Sci Fi Channel in Vancouver, B.C.

King Odysseus has been away from Ithaca for twenty years. The first ten he spent fighting the Trojan War; the last ten he spent fighting to get home. Among his adventures is the tale Homer felt was too horrible to tell, the missing book of the Odyssey known as "The Isle of the Mists". Here the Warrior King and his men face the Goddess of the Underworld and her winged horrific creatures, intent on bringing death and destruction to humanity.

== Plot ==
An elderly Homer (Perry Long) sits down in his home and begins writing a lost installment of the Odyssey, the tale of the Isle of the Mists, a story he felt was too terrible to tell before.

Years prior, Homer (Randal Edwards) is a member of Odysseus's (Arnold Vosloo) crew as they sail back to Ithaca following the Trojan War. The crew also includes Perimedes (JR Bourne), Eurylochus (Steve Bacic), Christos (Michael Antonakos) and others. During their travels, they become lost in a deep fog and encounter strange flying creatures who kill several men and drink their blood. The only thing that can kill the creatures is a wooden stake through the heart. In disarray, the crew lands at an island, the fabled Isle of the Mists, to repair their ships and recover from the attack.

After more encounters with the winged creatures, the crew meets a mysterious woman (Stefanie von Pfetten) who takes them to her refuge in the woods. Much to their surprise, the creatures seemingly ignore her and do not invade her sanctuary. Some of the crew remains suspicious even as they accept food and shelter from the woman. They learn of the Hellfire Cross, a mystical sword sealed by the gods on the island, that they come to believe can help them survive. The remaining crew decide to recover the Hellfire Cross as part of their plan to relaunch their ship.

After receiving visions from Athena (Sonya Salomaa), Odysseus realizes the mysterious woman is not what she seems. She uses her powers to transform into Odysseus's wife Penelope (Leah Gibson) and seduces him. Her failure to account for Penelope aging since the last time Odysseus saw her makes him realize the illusion, but only after he has sex with her. Odysseus and his remaining men realize her true identity: Persephone, the wife of Hades who has been banished to the Isle of the Mists and sealed there by the Hellfire Cross. Persephone reveals that the winged creatures are her children by Hades, and that she plans to escape the island with them to rule the world. Furthermore, she is now pregnant with a son by Odysseus.

Odysseus and his men escape to the cave where the Hellfire Cross is sealed and obtain it, but all except Odysseus and Homer die. They are confronted by Persephone, who thanks them for her freedom and attempts to convince Odysseus to serve her, as the Hellfire Cross cannot be wielded by a god. When he refuses, she tells them she will merely wait until her mortal son is born and ages instead. She starts to set the winged creatures free on the world and attempts to force Odysseus to cut his own throat, but he overcomes her power and impales her through the stomach, killing Persephone, their son and all the creatures. Some time after Persephone's death, Odysseus and Homer return to the sea and continue back to Ithaca.

Completing his story, the aged Homer muses about the origins of the winged creatures, how they could only be killed by a stake through the heart, and how they fear the sign of the cross. On the Isle of the Mists, Eurylochus - who was attacked by the creatures in the cave - has transformed into one of the creatures and flies off freely into the world.

== Cast ==
- Arnold Vosloo as Odysseus
- Randal Edwards as Homer
  - Perry Long as Elderly Homer
- Steve Bacic as Eurylochus
- JR Bourne as Perimedes
- Stefanie von Pfetten as Persephone
- Michael Antonakos as Christos
- Sonya Salomaa as Athena
- Leah Gibson as Penelope
