= Mercy (2023 film) =

- Theatrical release poster
- Directed by: Tony Dean Smith
- Written by: Alex Wright
- Produced by: Charles Cooper
- Starring: Leah Gibson; Jonathan Rhys Meyers; Jon Voight; Keith Lukowski; Agung Gede; Cliff Cash; Wendy Morgan; Jay A. Wollin; Brenda Rickert
- Cinematography: Adam Sliwinski
- Edited by: Shaun Lang
- Music by: Matthew Rogers
- Production companies: Mercy Road; Front Street Pictures
- Distributed by: Paramount Global Content Distribution
- Release date: May 12, 2023
- Running time: 85 minutes
- Country: United States
- Language: English

Mercy is a 2023 American action film written by Alex Wright, directed by Tony Dean Smith and starring Leah Gibson, Jonathan Rhys Meyers, and Jon Voight. It follows the doctor, a former military, who must protect the patient when the Irish mob takes over the hospital to go after the latter.

Mercy was released theatrically on May 12, 2023 in the United States. The film is panned by critics.

== Plot ==
Two years ago, Michelle Miller's husband Jeffrey died in a bomb explosion in front of her while serving in Afghanistan. She now works as a casualty surgeon at Mercy Hospital, and lives with her son Bobby.

Meanwhile, FBI agents McBride and Ellis have arrested Ryan Quinn, a member of the Irish mob the Quinn Gang Brotherhood. His brother Sean and father Patrick "Paddy" and family are responsible for committing a series of crimes in the United States.

While bringing Ryan into custody, Sean and his henchmen – Johnno, Danny, and Mick – ambush the convoy, killing most of the agents and wounding McBride. Sean shoots Ryan twice at close range. Ellis escapes and brings McBride and Ryan to the hospital.

The Quinns go to the hospital to get Ryan out. As they arrive, they kill the receptionist and take the visitors and staff hostage, while Michelle hides Bobby inside her locker. Ellis manages to hide Ryan in the upper floor of the building. While searching for Ryan, Sean kills McBride by disconnecting his ventilator.

The police arrive at the scene but Sean threatens to kill every hostage if they attempt to storm the hospital. Using her combat skills, Michelle kills Mick after a struggle. Bobby is found and is taken hostage. Paddy calls Michelle to exchange Ryan for Bobby. Sean puts a bomb vest on Michelle's friend Dr. Terrance and relays the message to the police not to intervene before Sean activates the bomb, killing Dr. Terrance.

Paddy confronts Sean for jeopardizing the job. So he reveals to his father that Ryan has tipped off their illegal business to the FBI, hence he's going after Ryan. Michelle finds Danny making a bomb and, after a struggle, kills him.

Michelle exchanges Ryan for Bobby in the morgue, soon having Bobby back in her arms. Ryan reveals to Paddy that Sean shot him point blank. Their father confronts Sean about it, stating that he will never forgive him. Then Sean blames him for his mother's death, which was due to his negligence. Paddy attacks Sean, who shoots his father in the abdomen. Before losing consciousness, Paddy repents failing Sean as a father. The police storm the building, kill the remaining henchmen and rescue the hostages.

Ellis kills Johnno after the latter attempts to catch Bobby, who escapes into the tunnel. Sean shoots Michelle, knocking her unconscious momentarily, before activating the timed bomb and escaping. Recovering, she defuses it before heading to the tunnel where Sean has taken Bobby hostage. Bobby stomps on Sean's feet and runs, allowing Michelle to kill him.

Ryan and Paddy are taken to another hospital, and Ellis commends Michelle for her bravery before she heads home with Bobby.

== Cast ==
- Leah Gibson as Michelle
- Jonathan Rhys Meyers as Sean Quinn
- Jon Voight as Patrick "Paddy" Quinn
- Sebastien Roberts as Ellis
- Anthony Konechny as Ryan Quinn
- Patrick Roccas as Johnno
- Anthony Bolognese as Bobby
- Bradley Stryker as Mick
- Caitlin Stryker as Agent Cruz
- Mark Masterton as Danny
- Ryan Russell as Nurse Kevin
- Bobby Stewart as Dr. Terrence
- Marc-Anthony Massiah as Frank

== Release ==
The film was released in theaters on May 12, 2023, and digitally on May 19, 2023. It was also released on demand on June 2, 2023. It was originally going to be released in theaters on May 19.

== Reception ==
Jeffrey M. Anderson of Common Sense Media awarded the film two stars out of five.

=== Accolades ===
At the 44th Golden Raspberry Awards, Jon Voight won Worst Actor.
