= Trapped (2001 film) =

2001 television film by Deran Sarafian

- Italian DVD cover
- Genre: Action drama
- Written by: Michael Vickerman
- Directed by: Deran Sarafian
- Starring: William McNamara; Parker Stevenson; Callum Keith Rennie; Suki Kaiser; Stefanie von Pfetten
- Music by: Bill Brown
- Country of origin: United States
- Original language: English

Production
- Executive producer: Wili Baronet
- Producer: Anthony Santa Croce
- Cinematography: Jon Joffin
- Editor: Katina Zinner
- Running time: 90 minutes
- Production companies: WilMark Entertainment; Playa Inc.

Original release
- Network: USA Network
- Release: July 24, 2001

Trapped is a 2001 American action drama television film directed by Deran Sarafian, written by Michael Vickerman, and starring William McNamara, Parker Stevenson, Callum Keith Rennie, and Meat Loaf. It premiered on the USA Network on July 24, 2001.

== Plot ==
A group of guests must escape a Las Vegas hotel that is on fire.

== Cast ==
- William McNamara as C. Whitmore Evans
- Parker Stevenson as Oliver Sloan
- Callum Keith Rennie as Anthony Bellio
- Suki Kaiser as Susan Bellio
- Stefanie von Pfetten as Rachel
- Natassia Malthe as Marisa
- Meat Loaf as Jim Hankins

== Reception ==
David Nusair from Reel Film Reviews gave Trapped only one star out of five, he stated: "Trapped doesn't really work, especially since we know exactly how these folks are going to get out of the burning building (c'mon, would it even be possible not to realize that Meat Loaf's ride is going to work its way back into the plot?) and the characters are straight out of a how-to-create-a-disaster-movie handbook. And for a flick with this many characters, remarkably few of them wind up charred corpses." Jules Faber from DVD.net gave the film 7 out of 10 stars, concluding: "Trapped is perhaps one of this new breed of film with some decent performances and clever, well-executed special effects. While a far cry from Oscar-winning portrayals, this is nonetheless a surprisingly good production, regardless of the rather tacked on ‘arsonist’ subplot."
