= John Bregar =

Canadian actor

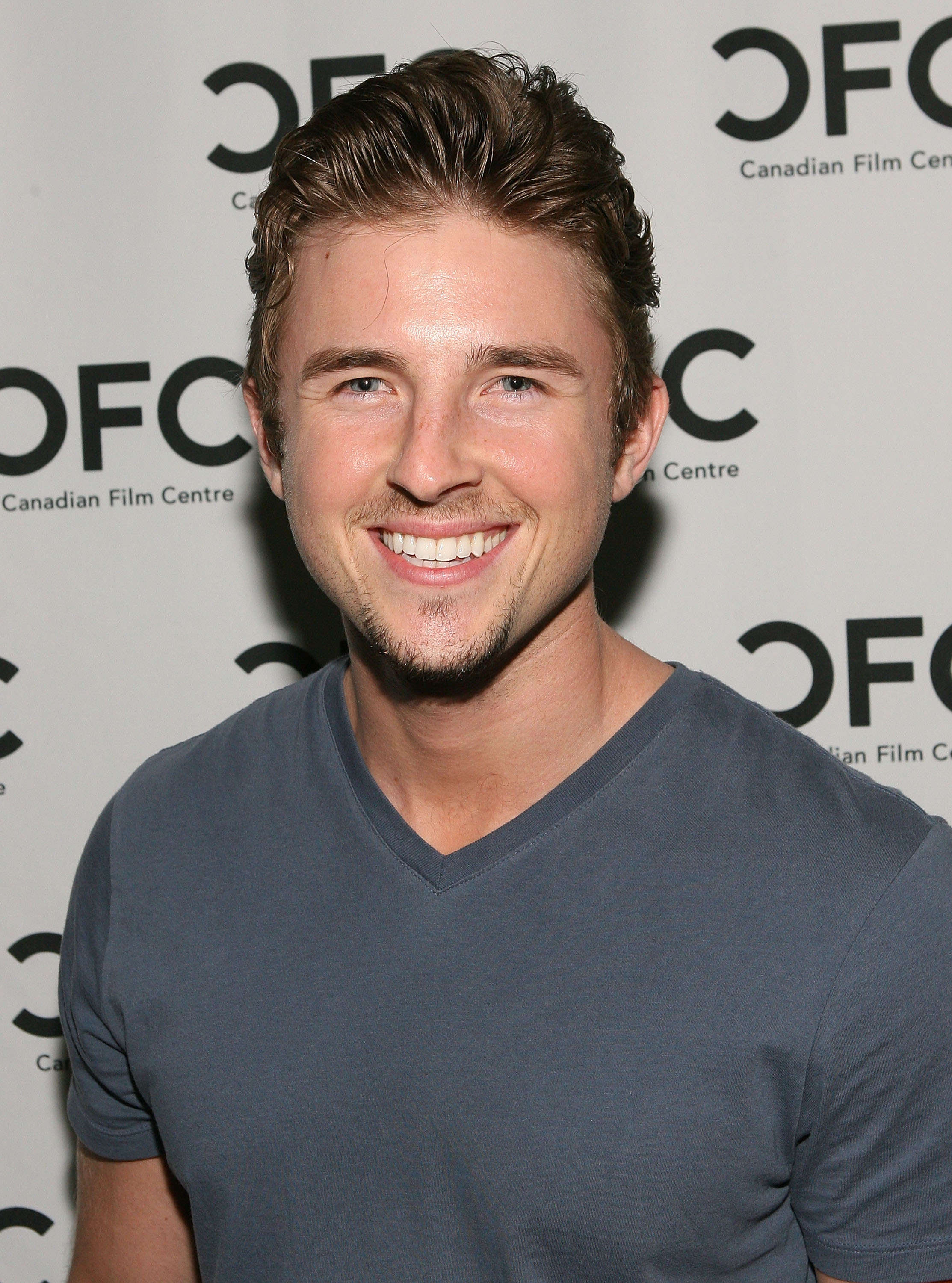
- Bregar in Beverly Hills, California, March 9, 2011
- Born: March 1, 1985 (age 41); North York, Ontario, Canada
- Years active: 2003–present

John Francis Bregar (born March 1, 1985) is a Canadian actor best known for his role as Dylan Michalchuk on Degrassi: The Next Generation. He also played Cody Flowers in Family Biz.

His professional acting debut was starring in the music video "Father" by Knights of the Realm. He played Jason Valentine in the Canadian Film Center short film, Todd And The Book Of Pure Evil. He and Adamo Ruggiero were nominated for a GLAAD Media Award at the 15th Annual GLAAD Media Awards and featured in The Advocate for their roles in Degrassi: The Next Generation as Dylan Michalchuk and Marco Del Rossi.

== Other work ==
Bregar also played Bobby Clarke in the made-for-TV movie Canada Russia '72.

Bregar also played Cody in the lifetime movie Dead At 17 (2008).

Bregar starred the film Verona with fellow Degrassi star Shannon Kook. The film was released in winter 2012 by Canadian Filmmakers Distribution Centre.

In 2009 Bregar portrayed the role of Scott Mink in CBS's show Flashpoint, along with Calum Worthy and Alexia Fast. He also portrayed an FBI agent in CBS's The Mentalist, in the episode "Red John", which aired on November 24, 2013.

Bregar guest starred in an episode of Murdoch Mysteries that aired March 18, 2013, playing a character named Alvin Storey. He appeared in an episode of Saving Hope that aired November 26, 2015, playing a husband of a pregnant woman in the hospital. Bregar also played a character named Trent Harris in two episodes of the third season in the US version of the supernatural TV show Being Human as a human and then a ghost after accidentally being killed by one of the leading characters.

== Filmography ==
=== Film ===
Year	Title	Role	Notes
2003	Todd and the Book of Pure Evil	Jason Valentine	Short
2006	It's a Boy Girl Thing	Richard	
2007	Left for Dead	Freddy	
2009	The Lesson	John	Short
2010	New Year	Tyler O'Neill	
2010	Verona	Brandon	Short
2011	Servitude	Tommy	
2011	The Entitled	Jeff Vincent	
2012	Bloodwork	Rob Jeffries	
2017	Awakening the Zodiac	Adam	
2018	TMI Crossing the Threshold	John Birch	

=== Television ===
Year	Title	Role	Notes
2003–2007	Degrassi: The Next Generation	Dylan Michalchuk	Recurring role (seasons 3–6)
2005	Darcy's Wild Life	Troy	"Cuz in Trouble"
2006	Canada Russia '72	Bobby Clarke	"1.1", "1.2"
2007	The Jane Show	Jimmy Whitton	"Voices from the Past"
2008	Dead at 17	Cody Masterson	TV film
2009	Being Erica	Barrett	"What I Am Is What I Am"
2009	Taking a Chance on Love	David	TV film
2009	The Best Years	Lou	"Dangerous Liaisons"
2009	Flashpoint	Scott Mink	"Perfect Storm"
2009	Family Biz	Cody Flowers	Recurring role (14 episodes)
2011	Jack of Diamonds	Campbell Lassiter	TV film
2011	Rookie Blue	Aaron Samuels	"Brotherhood"
2011	Desperately Seeking Santa	Neal McCormick	TV film
2013	Being Human	Trent Harris	"(Dead) Girls Just Wanna Have Fun", "The Teens, They Are a Changin'"
2013	Murdoch Mysteries	Alvin Storey	"Twisted Sisters"
2013	Satisfaction	Quinn	"Confrontations"
2013	The Mentalist	FBI Agent Mullins	"Red John"
2013	Fir Crazy	Lance	TV film
2014	Chop Shop	Porter	Recurring role
2015	Saving Hope	Adam Hart	"Shattered", "Emotional Rescue"
2018	iZombie	Max Roberts	"Don't Hate the Player, Hate the Brain"
