= Canada Russia '72 =

2006 Canadian ice hockey TV miniseries

- Written by: Barrie Dunn; Malcolm MacRury
- Directed by: T. W. Peacocke
- Starring: Booth Savage; Judah Katz; Mark Owen; Sonia Laplante; David Berni; Gabriel Hogan; Mike Dopud; Sebastien Roberts; Louis Philippe Dandenault; Jeff Roop; Hugh Thompson; David Alexander Miller; Gerry Dee; Chris Szarka; John Bregar; Yuriy Sobeshchakov; Daniel Matmor; Walter Learning
- Country of origin: Canada

Production
- Executive producer: Timothy M. Hogan
- Producers: Barrie Dunn; Rick LeGuerrier; Michael Volpe
- Running time: 180 minutes (in 2 parts)

Original release
- Network: CBC
- Release: April 9 – April 10, 2006

Canada Russia '72 is a 2006 Canadian docudrama miniseries about the 1972 Summit Series, a series of exhibition ice hockey games between state amateurs of the Soviet Union and professional players from Canada. The two-part miniseries was directed by T. W. Peacocke and written by Barrie Dunn and Malcolm MacRury. Canada Russia '72 first aired on CBC on April 9–10, 2006.

The title is historically inaccurate as the Union of Soviet Socialist Republics was the official name of the country until 1991. During the Soviet era, the Russian Soviet Federative Socialist Republic, was just one of 15 constituent republics of the country.

== Plot ==
=== Part 1 ===
The miniseries begins in medias res on September 8, 1972, as Team Canada takes the ice for Game 4 of the series in Vancouver. The team is shocked from the boos they receive from their home crowd and the cheers for the Soviet team. The film then cuts back five months earlier to April 1972 with Alan Eagleson meeting with Gabrielle Fournier, an official with External Affairs Canada, and the heads of the Soviet and Canadian ice hockey programmes (respectively headed by Alexander Gresko and by Joe Kryczka and Charles Hay) in Prague, Czechoslovakia. They finalize the deal for an eight-game hockey series between the USSR and a team compiled of the best Canadian NHL players.

Eagleson travels to Rochester to seek out former Boston Bruins coach Harry Sinden and convinces Sinden to coach the team. Sinden's interview with the Hockey Canada brass does not go well because of Kryczka's doubt of his capabilities and disagreement over wanting John Ferguson as an assistant coach, but Eagleson convinces them to hire Sinden, claiming he's the coach the players want. Sinden announces the roster of "Team Canada" in July at a press conference in Toronto. The roster includes notable players Phil Esposito, Paul Henderson, Ken Dryden, Vic Hadfield, Rod Gilbert, Bobby Clarke, Gary Bergman, Frank Mahovlich and Peter Mahovlich.

Team Canada's training camp begins in August, with many of the players arriving out of shape and not taking the camp seriously. In the weeks before the series begins, it becomes increasingly clear that most Canadians expect an eight-game sweep. Shortly prior to Game 1, Sinden privately confesses to Eagleson that he doesn't think the team is ready. Team Canada's scout reports to Sinden and Ferguson that the Soviets are a slow, poorly skilled team with the exception of one player, Valeri Kharlamov ("Karla-something") and that their goalie, Vladislav Tretiak (mispronounced "Tet-tri-ak"), couldn't stop a bus. Some of the Canadian players attend a Soviet practice and spend it laughing at the Soviet players, until Kharlamov shoots a puck into the stands at them, creating instant hostility between the teams.

Game 1 in Montreal starts out as expected, with Esposito scoring less than 30 seconds into the game. Five minutes later, Henderson scores to give the Canadians a 2–0 lead. However, the Soviets quickly respond back and tie the game 2–2 before the first period is over. The Canadian players become fatigued by the rising temperature in the Montreal Forum, making it continuously more difficult for them to play. Kharlamov scores twice on Dryden in the second period, giving the Soviets a 4–2 lead. Throughout the game, Tretiak proves to be impregnable as a goalie, and the fatigue of the Canadian players is noticeably shown. The Soviets defeat the Canadians 7–3 in Game 1.

Team Canada and the country are left in shock after their defeat, and the team begins to receive large amounts of criticism. For Game 2 in Toronto, Sinden takes the GAG line out of the lineup and replaces them with grinders (Wayne Cashman, J. P. Parise and Bill Goldsworthy). Vic Hadfield does not take the decision lightly and invades Sinden's dressing room to express his disapproval. Also, Tony Esposito replaces Dryden in net. During the practice, Frank Mahovlich notices politician Robert Stanfield in the stands wearing a Team Canada jersey and talking with Alan Eagleson. Frank complains about this to Sinden, claiming they're not playing the series for the politicians. Frank then leaves the practice in protest. Before Game 2, Frank privately confesses to Pete his fear of losing the series to Communists.

Team Canada wins Game 2 4–1, tying the series. After the game, frustrated Soviet coach Vsevolod Bobrov invades the officials dressing room, angrily complaining about their officiating and Team Canada's play.

In Winnipeg, Gresko and Bobrov request that the referees who officiated Game 2 not officiate again and that the referees who officiated Game 1 work Game 3 and 4. Although initially objecting due its violation of the series contract, Eagleson agrees to the request, thinking the Soviets will know they owe them one. Much to his frustration, Hadfield sits out Game 3 too. In Game 3, Team Canada builds a 3–1 lead, but the Soviets come back and the game ends in a 4–4 tie. While sitting in the airport before a flight to Vancouver, Frank expresses his paranoia about the Soviets further to Serge Savard.

As they prepare for Game 4 in Vancouver, Sinden and Ferguson decide to put Dryden and the Hadfield line back in the lineup. When Team Canada takes the ice for the game, they are booed by the Vancouver fans. Seconds later, the Soviets take the ice and are cheered by the Vancouver fans, leaving the team shocked and frustrated. In the first five minutes of the game, Goldsworthy takes 2 penalties, both resulting in goals for the Soviets. Trailing after the second period, Esposito tells Henderson that he wants to give the fans a piece of his mind. Team Canada loses the game 5–3, falling behind in the series 2 games to 1 (with one tied) going to Moscow. As the team is booed off the ice, Esposito stays back for an interview. Esposito emotionally remarks on his disappointment in the Canadian crowd, and claims that they're only playing because they love Canada.

=== Part 2 ===
Part 2 begins with Alan Eagleson being interviewed on the CBC TV show Front Page Challenge, in which Eagleson comments on his disapproval of the Vancouver fans. While waiting in the Vancouver airport, Eagleson receives news that Frank Mahovlich will not be travelling to Sweden for their exhibition game due to allergies. At a reception with the Canadian ambassador in Stockholm, Sinden states their game against the Swedish national team will just be "a friendly game of shinny". However, the game turns into a brutal one. Sinden and Ferguson become aggravated by the officiating of Josef Kompalla and Franz Baader. During the game, a Swedish player slashes Cashman in the mouth and slices his tongue, in which no call is made and a fight ensues. After the game, Sinden and Ferguson follow the officials to their dressing room, angrily complaining about Cashman's cut. Back at the hotel, Hadfield has a private conversation with Eagleson, in which he expresses his concern of Sinden's coaching. The next day, Frank Mahovlich rejoins the team, which Hadfield takes as a sign that he will not play. It is also there that Eagleson informs the team that there will be no room in the hotel in Moscow for the players' wives. Esposito, fed up with all the bad press, ridicule, and contempt that the team has received during the series, leads the team in threatening to not go to the Soviet Union if their wives don't.

As they arrive at the hotel in Moscow, Gabrielle Fournier warns the team about getting in trouble in the Soviet Union. Before practice, Hadfield sees that he is not playing in Game 5. A frustrated Hadfield has an argument with Sinden during practice, which subsequently results in Hadfield leaving the team and going back to Canada, along with a few other players.

Team Canada builds a 4–1 lead in the 3rd period of Game 5. During the celebration of Canada's fourth goal, a Soviet soldier pulls a Canadian fan who was making noise by blowing into a plastic horn out of the crowd and drags him into a backroom. Ms. Fournier runs after them and gets Gresko to go talk to the police. Gresko tells her that he is being arrested for assault. As Ms. Fournier waits for the police to come out, she hears the crowd roar several times. She finally goes back in to check the score and it's 4–4. The Soviets then score another goal and win the game 5–4, scoring four unanswered goals in the third period. The next morning, Fournier makes a deal with the Soviet police to free the Canadian fan on the condition that he leaves the country immediately. The now fully shaved fan confesses to Fournier that the police took his clothes, hung him by his ankles, and tattooed his heels.

Back at the hotel, Cashman, Esposito, and Bergman decide to search Bergman's room for listening devices. Thinking they have found something under the carpet, they unscrew a box and hear a noise from below. They go to the lobby and see they unscrewed the system that was holding up a chandelier, thus causing the chandelier to shatter all over the floor.

For Game 6, Sinden puts Dryden back in net. During the warm-ups for the game, Sinden and Ferguson notice that Baader and Kompalla, the "two clowns" from Sweden are officiating. The two referees call penalties against the Canadians all game long. At one point, Esposito collides with a Soviet player, cutting him below his eye. Although no penalty is called, Bobrov tells the player to show Kompalla the blood. After seeing the player's cut, Kompalla gives Esposito a 5-minute major penalty. Sinden angrily objects, claiming it a penalty for bleeding. As Kharlamov continues to dominate the game, Ferguson leans over and whispers something in Bobby Clarke's ear. Henderson, who is sitting next to Clarke, is shocked at what he overhears, although he says nothing. On his next shift, Clarke comes up behind Kharlamov and aggressively slashes him on the ankle, injuring him. Henderson scores later in the game and the Canadians hold on for a 3–2 win. After the game, Gresko and Bobrov express their anger to the camera crew about Clarke's slash. Fournier confronts Ferguson about the slash, to which Ferguson replies he doesn't care how his team wins, just as long as they win.

The next day Sinden, Ferguson, and Eagleson meet with Gresko about Baader and Kompalla. Gresko agrees that they will not officiate again in the series on several conditions that Sinden objects to, but they accept anyway. For Game 7, Kharlamov sits out due to his ankle injury. During the game, a fight breaks out between the teams. During the fight, Soviet player Boris Mikhailov kicks Bergman with his skate. Late in the game, Henderson dekes several defensemen and scores, giving Team Canada a 4–3 lead and the win. In the dressing room after the game, Bergman shows the team his blooded shin pad as a result of Mikhailov's kick. Ferguson takes the shin pad and shows it to Fournier.

The next day, Gresko goes back on his promise and says Badder and Kompalla will officiate Game 8. Ferguson threatens they will not play if they do. Eagleson and the coaches hold out their decision to not play, until the next day when Fournier suggests a deal in which both teams pick one referee. The teams agree to the compromise. The Soviets choose Kompalla. However, the referee the Canadians choose surprisingly is sick, so the Canadians go with another referee. Sinden informs the team that the game is on. They also inform Dryden that he will be starting, leaving Dryden visibly shaking as he leaves the table.

Before the game, the Canadian dressing room is silent, and Dryden claims he cannot stop shaking. Sinden tells the team winning is now the only thing that matters, and that by winning the series they will vindicate themselves. The Canadian team is surprised to see Kharlamov is playing despite his severe injury. In the first minutes, the Canadians receive questionable penalties from Kompalla. With the advantage, the Soviets score a powerplay goal to give them a 1–0 lead. Shortly after, Parise is given a penalty on what appears to be an obvious dive. The Canadians' emotions quickly boil over, and Parise nearly swings his stick at Kompalla. As a result, Parise is given a game misconduct and a match penalty. A highly tempered Sinden and Ferguson throw a stick and a chair onto the ice in frustration. Esposito later scores to tie the game. However, the Soviets build a 5–3 lead before the 2nd intermission. In the dressing room, a determined Esposito claims they will not lose. Esposito goes to Sinden and suggests he make a change to his line. Sinden has Peter Mahovlich take his brother's place on the line.

The Canadians quickly score in the 3rd period to make it 5–4. Later in the game, Yvan Cournoyer scores to tie the game. Eagleson notices from the stands that the goal light did not go on and storms to the timekeeper's box. Eagleson is subdued by the Soviet guards and appears to be being arrested. Team Canada, led by Pete Mahovlich, storm the area and rescue Eagleson from the guards. As he's being walked backed to the Canadian bench, an angered Eagleson shoves his fist to the crowd. At the Canadians' bench, Eagleson tells Sinden that he noticed the goal light didn't go on and went to the timekeeper's box to make sure the Soviets didn't cheat them out of a goal. Late during the game, Gresko comes to the Canadian bench and informs Eagleson that if the game ends in a tie, the Soviets will win the series based on goal differential (the Soviets had two more goals than the Canadians). Esposito overhears the conversation, and becomes more determined to win the game, even refusing to get off the ice despite being fatigued. In the last minute of the game, Henderson calls Pete Mahovlich off the ice and skates to the net. Though he doesn't score, Esposito shoots the puck at Tretiak. Henderson picks up the rebound and scores to give the Canadians a 6–5 lead with 34 seconds left in the game. The Canadians clear the bench and crowd Henderson in celebration. Team Canada holds the lead and wins the game, thus winning the series. As the game ends, one of the Canadian players picks up the game-winning puck (the camera does not show the player's face or number, therefore leaving the player's identity unknown.)

As the Canadians proudly celebrate in the dressing room, Alexander Yakushev gifts the team with a samovar from the Soviets. Esposito accepts the samovar, and gives Yakushev a hockey stick and a beer in return on behalf of the team. As the team continues celebrating, Sinden and Ferguson quietly sit in their room. Ferguson asks Sinden if he wants to join them. Sinden says he needs a few minutes to "take this all in". A handshake between the two follows, as they continue to sit silently in their room (In the extended version, Sinden leaves and Ferguson breaks down in tears).

The miniseries ends with several players of the team going onto the ice one more time. The team stand and sit on the ice in silence, absorbing the series and their experience as a whole. (This concluding moment was the one scene in the mini-series that liberally interpreted the truth and perhaps was the most dramatized. The players did not go back on the ice, but this coda was based on an interview with defenseman Gary Bergman, who said that he stopped before leaving the ice for the final time and took in the "old barn" (Luzhniki Ice Palace).

== Cast ==
Actor	Role
Booth Savage	Harry Sinden
Judah Katz	Alan Eagleson
Mark Owen	John Ferguson
Sonia Laplante	Gabrielle Fournier (a fictional character)
David Berni	Phil Esposito
Gabriel Hogan	Ken Dryden
Mike Dopud	Vic Hadfield
Tyson Waye	Red Berenson
Sebastien Roberts	Rod Gilbert
Louis-Philippe Dandenault	Yvan Cournoyer
Jeff Roop	Frank Mahovlich
Hugh Thompson	Gary Bergman
David Alexander Miller	Paul Henderson
Gerry Dee	Wayne Cashman
Chris Szarka	Peter Mahovlich
John Bregar	Bobby Clarke
Marc Savard	Serge Savard
Jason Thibodeau	Jean-Paul Parise
Rob Brydges	Bill Goldsworthy
Yuriy Sobeshchakov	Vsevolod Bobrov
Daniel Matmor	Alexander Gresko
Leo Vernik	Vladislav Tretiak
Joel Cousins	Valeri Kharlamov
Gary Levert	Joe Kryczka
Walter Learning	Charlie Hay
Eugene Lipinski	Anatoly Tarasov

== Production ==
The docudrama was produced by Barrie Dunn and Michael Volpe for Halifax-based Summit Films and Timothy M. Hogan and Rick LeGuerrier for Moncton-based Dream Street Pictures, with a budget of $7.8 million. It received financial assistance from Telefilm Canada, the Canadian Television Fund, New Brunswick Film, and a distribution deal with Maple Pictures. The docudrama was written by Dunn and Malcolm MacRury.

Dunn began pitching the project in the early 2000s, though he was unable to secure financing from the Nova Scotia Film Development Corporation, he was soon contacted by three other provinces who wished to secure the production. Dunn and Volpe met Hogan and LeGuerrier at the 2004 Banff Television Festival and quickly made plans to begin production in New Brunswick. The docudrama was filmed in 2005 over 36 days in Fredericton and Saint John. Post-production was completed at Power Post in Halifax.

The cast were chosen for acting and skating ability, and resemblance to the people they were portraying. Hockey tryouts were held in Halifax and Fredericton for non-leading roles, drawing from players with junior ice hockey or higher experience. The cast performed their own skating and a hockey choreographer trained them to recreate key on-ice moments.

All on-ice recreations of the games used the audio from the original telecast of the Summit Series, featuring play-by-play commentary by Foster Hewitt and colour commentary by Brian Conacher. The scenes in which only Soviet representatives appear were shown in black-and-white.

== Music ==
There is no official soundtrack or musical score for the miniseries. The following is a list of the songs featured in the miniseries. All of the songs are contemporary to the period by Canadian musicians, and most of them are used more than once.

In order of appearance:

- "No Sugar Tonight" – The Guess Who
- "Oh, What a Feeling" – Crowbar
- "Runnin' Back to Saskatoon" – The Guess Who
- "No Time" – The Guess Who
- "One Fine Morning" – Lighthouse
- "Absolutely Right" – Five Man Electrical Band
- "Signs" – Five Man Electrical Band
- "The Weight" – The Band
- "Where Evil Grows" – The Poppy Family
- "Avalanche" – Leonard Cohen

== Analysis ==
With previous extant documentaries about the Summit Series and no new details revealed in the programme, sport historian Russell Field contends that the docudrama is not about explaining the series but "an argument about how the series should be remembered." In the CBC's role (defined in the Broadcasting Act of 1991) to contribute to a "shared national consciousness and identity", the docudrama attempts to bring the touchstone of the Summit Series to new and young Canadians. Field suggests that the docudrama is a "heritage narrative", using a variety of devices to promote a unified national identity. He notes that by opening with Game 4 and Esposito's interview, the docudrama frames Team Canada as heroic and patriotic underdogs rather than overconfident and spoiled elites. The Soviets, on the other hand, are depersonalized and marginalized through the black-and-white scenes.

== Release ==
=== Promotion ===
Marketing for the docudrama targeted sports fans, with teasers on Hockey Night in Canada, advertisements in Sports Illustrated and daily papers, and promotional spots at stadiums.

=== Home video ===
On 3 October 2006, a three-disc DVD set of the docudrama was released by Maple Pictures, with producer/director commentary and a commentary by Team Canada coach Harry Sinden and Hockey Canada director Alan Eagleson.

== Reception ==
=== Ratings ===
The docudrama received an average audience of 814,000 on 9 April and 771,000 on 10 April, falling short of the network's programming goal of one million viewers for dramas.

=== Critical response ===
William Houston wrote for the Globe and Mail that the film was "entertaining [while making] no attempt to romanticize Canada's come-from-behind triumph". He felt that the retelling could be controversial for its portrayals of the hockey icons as childish and arrogant.

=== Awards and nominations ===
Award	Category	Recipients and nominees	Result
Gemini Awards	Best Performance by an Actor in a Featured Supporting Role in a Dramatic Program or Mini-Series	Judah Katz	Won
Gemini Awards	Best Picture Editing in a Dramatic Program or Series	Dean Soltys	Won
Gemini Awards	Best Achievement in Casting	Marjorie Lecker; Donna Rae Gibbs; Sheila Lane	Nominated
Gemini Awards	Best Direction in a Dramatic Program or Mini-Series	T. W. Peacocke	Nominated
Directors Guild of Canada	Outstanding Picture Editing – Television Movie/Mini-Series	Dean Soltys	Won
Directors Guild of Canada	Outstanding Television Movie/Mini-Series	Canada Russia '72	Nominated
