= Black Swarm =

- Teaser Poster
- Written by: Todd Samovitz; Ethlie Ann Vare
- Directed by: David Winning
- Starring: Sebastien Roberts; Sarah Allen; Robert Englund; Rebecca Windheim
- Theme music composer: Mario Sévigny
- Country of origin: Canada
- Original language: English

Production
- Producers: Irene Litinsky; Ric Nish
- Cinematography: Daniel Vincelette
- Editor: Simon Webb
- Running time: 90 minutes
- Production companies: RHI Entertainment; Muse Entertainment

Original release
- Release: 7 December 2007

Black Swarm is a 2007 Canadian suspense film directed by David Winning. Actor Robert Englund plays a mysterious beekeeper who has a secret to hide in the small town of Black Stone. It is the ninth film in the Maneater film series.

== Plot ==
A widow, Deputy Sheriff Jane Kozik, moves from Manhattan to Black Stone, New York with her nine-year-old daughter Kelsey Kozik. There, she expects to find a safe place to live. The day after moving, a homeless man is found dead in the tool shed of Jane's blind friend Beverly Rowe. Devin Hall and the entomologist Katherine Randell are summoned to help with the investigation. Devin is Jane's brother-in-law and former boyfriend, and Jane still has a crush on him. Meanwhile, Kelsey befriends the scientist Eli Giles, who has developed genetically modified wasps for the army as a weapon, and now he is trying to revert the process. When the wasps attack Black Stone, Jane, Devin and Eli team-up to attempt to destroy the swarm.

== Cast ==
- Sebastien Roberts as Devin Hall
- Robert Englund as Eli Giles
- Sarah Allen as Jane Kozik
- Rebecca Windheim as Kelsey Kozik
- Jayne Heitmeyer as Katherine Randell

== Production ==
The movie was filmed in Montreal and surrounding small towns in July and August 2007. It is the 9th film of the Maneater Series.

== Release ==
It was released on DVD by Genius Entertainment on February 3, 2009.

== Reception ==
Scott Foy of DreadCentral rated it 3.5 out of 5 and called it "an above average effort from the Sci-Fi Channel that never insults your intelligence even though it does have its fair share of logic gaps". Laura Burrows of IGN rated it 4 out of 10 and called it "an awful film" with "terrible CGI". Patrick Bromley of DVD Verdict describes it as having "terrible CGI effects" and "cheesy plotting and non-existent acting". Justin Felix of DVD Talk called it a "celluloid atrocity", though he stated that it has a "certain Ed Wood B-movie charm to it".
