= Tommy Westphall =

Fictional TV character

- St. Elsewhere character
- Chad Allen as Tommy in "The Last One" (1988)
- First appearance: "All About Eve"; December 14, 1983
- Last appearance: "The Last One"; May 25, 1988
- Portrayed by: Chad Allen

In-universe information
- Gender: Male
- Relatives: Dr. Donald Westphall (father)

Tommy Westphall, portrayed by Chad Allen, is a minor character from the drama television series St. Elsewhere, which ran on NBC from 1982 to 1988. His father is Dr. Donald Westphall (played by Ed Flanders), who has a leading role in the series.

Tommy, who is autistic, played an expanded role in St. Elsewhere's final episode, "The Last One". The most widely accepted interpretation of the episode is that the whole storyline of St. Elsewhere took place entirely within Tommy Westphall's imagination. As characters from St. Elsewhere have appeared on other television shows and those shows' characters appeared on more shows, and so on, a "Tommy Westphall Universe" hypothesis (postulated by Dwayne McDuffie) argues that a significant amount of fictional episodic television exists within a fictional universe imagined by Tommy Westphall.

== "The Last One" ==
In the last episode's final two scenes, Donald Westphall—having just returned to St. Eligius—is shown in Dr. Auschlander's office pondering the recent death from stroke of his colleague and mentor. With the aria "Chi il bel sogno di Doretta" (Doretta's Beautiful Dream) from Puccini's opera La Rondine playing, Tommy Westphall enters the office and runs to the window, where he looks at the snow falling outside St. Eligius. An exterior camera shot of the hospital cuts to Tommy Westphall sitting in the living room of an apartment building alongside his grandfather, now being portrayed by Norman Lloyd (aka "Daniel Auschlander"). Tommy's father, still being portrayed by Ed Flanders (aka "Donald Westphall") arrives at the apartment wearing a hard hat. The following exchange occurs:

Father: "Hi Pop, how you doing?"

Grandfather: "Good. How was your day up on the building?"

Father: "Well, we finally topped off the 22nd story. And I'm beat. How's he been? (referring to Tommy) He give you any trouble?"

Grandfather: "He's been sitting there ever since you left this morning, just like he does every day. World of his own."

Father: "I don't understand this autism thing, Pop. Here's my son, I talk to him, I don't even know if he can hear me. He sits there, all day long, in his own world, staring at that toy. What's he thinking about?"

Tommy, who is shaking a snow globe, is told by his father to come and wash his hands. As they leave the living room, Tommy's father places the snow globe upon a television set. The camera slowly zooms in on the snow globe, which is revealed to contain a replica of St. Eligius hospital inside of it.

The foremost interpretation of this scene is that the entire series of events in St. Elsewhere were dreamt by Tommy Westphall, and thus, products of his imagination. According to Lindsey Freeman, the narrative framing of Tommy's imagination as within a snow globe occurs because, as an "oneiric and mnemonic gadget", a snow globe "often finds itself as a companion piece to the dream sequences found in television and movies". He adds that, "while a controversial and maddening ending for some loyal viewers, the final episode of St. Elsewhere illustrates the rich and often blurred boundaries in how we experience the world."

== Tommy Westphall universe hypothesis ==
The Tommy Westphall universe hypothesis makes the claim that not only does St. Elsewhere take place within Tommy's mind, but so do numerous other television series which are directly and indirectly connected to St. Elsewhere through fictional crossovers and spin-offs, resulting in a large fictional universe taking place entirely within Tommy's mind. This hypothesis was originally put forward by comic book and TV writer Dwayne McDuffie in a 2002 blog post titled Six Degrees of St. Elsewhere as a reductio ad absurdum argument against making strong statements about fictional continuity based upon guest appearances.

In a 2003 article published on BBC News Online, St. Elsewhere writer Tom Fontana was quoted as saying "Someone did the math once... and something like 90 percent of all [American] television took place in Tommy Westphall's mind. God love him."

=== An example of crossover ===
The St. Elsewhere characters Dr. Roxanne Turner (Alfre Woodard) and Dr. Victor Ehrlich (Ed Begley Jr.) appeared on Homicide: Life on the Street. Fontana was the executive producer and showrunner for Homicide for the entirety of its seven-year run.

Proponents of the Tommy Westphall Universe argue that because of this fictional crossover, the two series exist within the same fictional universe, and within Tommy Westphall's mind because of the final episode of St. Elsewhere; by extension this hypothesis can be extended to include the science fiction program The X-Files and the Law & Order franchise (due to various crossovers with characters from Homicide, in particular Det. John Munch). Law & Order creator Dick Wolf is close friends with Fontana and frequently crossed Homicide characters over into his own series.

=== Objections ===
There are other possible interpretations of Tommy's "vision" which may suggest something other than the entire series being his dream. For instance, it may be the other way around, and the snow globe scene may itself be the dream. Brian Weatherson, then professor of philosophy at Cornell University, wrote a piece, "Six Objections to the Westphall Hypothesis", which challenges the logical, factual, and philosophical basis for the existence of the "universe".

=== Homages ===
When directing episodes for the eighth series of the revived Doctor Who in 2014, Ben Wheatley had the art department create a replica of Tommy Westphall's snowglobe, which Wheatley placed in the TARDIS set as a reference to the hypothesis.

NewsRadio episode "Daydream" (season 3 episode 7) ends with Jimmy James staring into a snow globe that appears to contain a miniature version of the WNYX office, thus seeming to indicate that Jimmy James has imagined the entire episode.

The final scene of 30 Rock opens with a view of the eponymous building, which fades into a model of the same, in a snow globe, observed by NBC president Kenneth Parcell roughly a century into the future, as flying cars whiz past his window. The entire series is revealed to have been based on the stories Liz Lemon told her great-granddaughter, a future television writer, and as remembered by the more-or-less immortal Parcell.

Dr Pepper includes an homage to Tommy Westphall's snowglobe in its 2021 advertising campaign. The commercial titled "Off Season" features the cast of the mock sitcom "Fansville" discussing their purpose after the conclusion of the college football season. After the "Fansville" characters exchange meta-humorous existential comments, the camera pans out to show that the characters in fact exist in a snowglobe sitting on Larry Culpepper's desk. Therefore, the commercial also does homage to the Newhart finale, as Larry Culpepper's presence from a previous Dr Pepper ad campaign references Bob Newhart's psychiatrist from The Bob Newhart Show appearing in "The Last Newhart".

An episode of Strong Medicine shows with an autistic girl gazing into a snow globe of Rittenhouse Hospital, where the series is set.

The series finale of The Late Show with Stephen Colbert ended with a wormhole sucking up the Ed Sullivan Theater turning it into a snowglobe, in a parody of the St. Elsewhere finale.

In the Homestar Runner holiday cartoon "Which Ween Costumes?", the character Pom Pom wears a costume of a festive snowglobe containing a replica of the character lineup seen in the cartoon, to which Homestar Runner quips "oh, Begley, Pom Pom, that is the best last-episode-of-St. Elsewhere costume I have ever seen", referencing both the St. Elsewhere finale and actor Ed Begley Jr., who played Dr. Victor Ehrlich on the show.

== See also ==
- List of autistic fictional characters
- Shared universe
- Six Degrees of Kevin Bacon
