= Daryl Shuttleworth =

Canadian actor (born 1960)

- Born: July 22, 1960 (age 66); Vancouver, British Columbia, Canada
- Occupation: Actor
- Years active: 1988–present

Daryl Shuttleworth (born July 22, 1960) is a Canadian actor. He has had numerous small roles in a wide variety of North American television shows and films over the years, but is best known for his role as Detective Sean "Bub" Bailey in the gay-themed Donald Strachey mystery films.

Shuttleworth is the former president of the Canadian Virtual Airlines, a roleplaying simulation about piloting airplanes. He played two different roles in the Stargate SG-1 television series. He has appeared in 6 TV pilots.

== Filmography ==
=== Film ===
Year	Title	Role	Notes
1989	Millennium	TV Reporter: Crash Site	
1992	Killer Image	Cop #1	
1997	One of Our Own	Base Guard	
1999	Turbulence 2: Fear of Flying	Captain Reynolds	
2001	Replicant	Uniform Foyer Cop	
2002	Black Point	Fed #1	
2003	Water's Edge	Sheriff Dodd	
2006	Shock to the System	Detective "Bub" Bailey	
2008	Chaos Theory	Officer Fields	
2008	On the Other Hand, Death	Detective "Bub" Bailey	
2008	Lost Boys: The Tribe	McGraw	
2008	Ice Blues	Detective "Bub" Bailey	
2009	Watchmen	Jon's Father	
2009	On the Run	Detective	
2010	Dear Mr. Gacy	Thompson	
2013	Suddenly	Nate	
2018	In God I Trust	John	

=== Television ===
Year	Title	Role	Notes
1988	Friday the 13th	Keith Fielding	1.24 "Pipe Dream"
1988	War of the Worlds	Signal Corps Technician	1.1 "The Resurrection"
1993	Ordeal in the Arctic	Ground Commander	TV movie
1993–1997	North of 60	Arthur Curtis / FBI Agent #2	8 episodes
1996	Viper	Officer Harding	1.1 "Winner Take All"
1997	The Hired Heart	Jimmy Rawlinbow	TV movie
1997	Honey, I Shrunk the Kids	Ghost	1.3 "Honey, I'm Haunted"
1998	Cold Squad	Jacob Knewling	1.1 "Christopher Williams"
1998	Ebenezer	Fred, Ebenezer's Nephew	TV movie
1998	Millennium	Brian Dixon	2.23 "The Time is Now"
1998	The Wonderful World of Disney	Non-Believer	Episode: "Noah"
1999	Atomic Train	Desk Sergeant	2 episodes
1999	The Outer Limits	Burns	5.1 "Alien Radio"
1999	Mentors	Ted Sampson	2 episodes
2000–2002	Stargate SG-1	Commander Tegar / Commander Rigar	2 episodes
2001	Mentors	Ted Sampson	2.10 "The Fire Ship"
2002	Door to Door	Larry	TV movie
2002	Smallville	Vice Principal Gibbons	2.4 "Red"
2003	Andromeda	Bettor #1	4.4 "Double or Nothingness"
2004	The L Word	Dan Foxworthy	3 episodes
2004	The 4400	Announcer One	1.1 Untitled Pilot
2004	Dead Like Me	Coach Henson	2.6 "In Escrow"
2005	The Magic of Ordinary Days	Reverend Dunne	TV movie
2005	Supervolcano	First Officer	TV movie, Uncredited
2005	Third Man Out	Detective "Bub" Bailey	TV movie
2005	The L Word	Dan Foxworthy	2.9 "Late, Later, Latent"; 2.10 "Land Ahoy" (scenes with Shuttleworth deleted)
2005–2009	Supernatural	Sheriff Rick Carnegie / Chuck Lambert	2 episodes
2005	Da Vinci's City Hall	Sandy Dandrige	1.3 "Isn't Very Pretty But You Can Smoke It"
2006	Flight 93	Boston Supervisor	TV movie
2006	Saved	Mulholland	1.2 "The Lady & The Tiger"
2006	The Dead Zone	Bob Westerfield	5.6 "Lotto Fever"
2006	Eureka	Global Security Tactical Commander	1.4 "Alienated"
2006	Men in Trees	Doug	2 episodes
2007	Anna's Storm	Pastor Evan Ford	TV movie
2007	Masters of Science Fiction	Otis Brill	1.5 "Little Brother"
2008–2009	The L Word	Dan Foxworthy	2 episodes
2009	Revolution	Fred Allard	TV movie
2014	Happy Face Killer	Sheriff J. D. Cotton	TV movie
