= April Telek =

Canadian actress

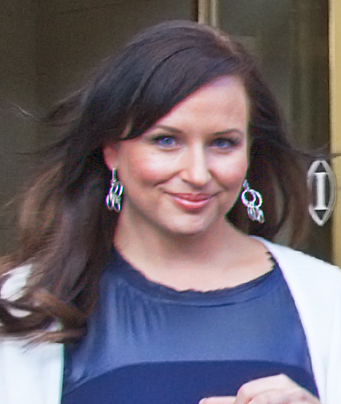
- Telek at the 2010 Toronto International Film Festival
- Born: April Amber Telek; April 29, 1975 (age 51); Vancouver, Canada
- Other name: April A. Telek
- Occupation: Actress
- Years active: 1995–present
- Spouse: Jamie Campbell
- Children: 1

April Amber Telek (born April 29, 1975) is a Canadian actress.

== Early life ==
Telek was born and raised on the North Shore of Vancouver, British Columbia. In Japan, she pursued her modelling career and won a Shiseido Cosmetics contract for Asia from 1989 to 1990. In April 1994, she won the title of Miss Canada and represented Canada in several international pageants.

== Career ==
She is known for portraying Denise in George Lopez's Mr. Troop Mom.

Telek won the coveted Women In Film and Television Award of Artistic Merit at the Vancouver International Film Festival 2010 for her portrayal of Jana (loosely based on Lana Clarkson) in Amazon Falls. In June 2011, she also won the Leo Award, Best Performance by a Female in a Leading Role for a Feature Film, for Amazon Falls. In 2016, she was a voice performer in the video game Dead Rising 4 as a survivor. In 2017, she received another Leo Award nomination for Best Guest Performance by a Female in a Dramatic Series for her role as Donna Williams in the TV series Rogue.

== Personal life ==
April is married to Jamie Campbell and has one daughter, Ava (b. November 8, 2006), who is also an actress, from a previous relationship with Gaming Executive Joe LaCascia.

=== Rape accusation against Peter Nygard ===
In 2020, Telek claimed she was raped by fashion mogul Peter Nygård. She made the claim soon after Nygård was accused of child sex trafficking. Telek told CBC's The Fifth Estate that in November 1993, she was contacted to model a new line of Nygard's clothing in Winnipeg. She stated that after arriving at Nygard's executive suite, he exposed himself, asked her for oral sex, and after she declined, he raped her several times over a two day period. Lawyers for Nygard said he denied any sexual assaults of anyone, and further said sworn statements from two witnesses disputed Telek's allegations.

== Filmography ==
=== Film ===
Year	Title	Role	Notes
1995	Deadlocked: Escape from Zone 14	Blonde Singer	TV movie
1995	Deadly Sins	Gwendolyn 'Gwen' Jones	
1996	A Kidnapping in the Family	Marlee	TV movie
1996	Ski Hard	Samantha	
1996	Fall into Darkness	Flight Attendant	TV movie
1997	Echo	Stu's Date	TV movie
1997	Volcano: Fire on the Mountain	Brenda Webb	TV movie
1997	Dead Man's Gun	Brittany	TV movie
1997	Dad's Week Off	Bikini Girl	TV movie
1997	Bounty Hunters 2: Hardball	Fiona	Video
1997	Masterminds	Sexy Girl	
1997	Excess Baggage	News Reporter	
1997	When Danger Follows You Home	Pam	TV movie
1998	Voyage of Terror	Rhonda Rowan	TV movie
1999	Y2K	Chloe	
1999	Freeway II: Confessions of a Trickbaby	Mrs. Wilson	
1999	My Father's Angel	-	
1999	Little Boy Blue	Hotty Cashier	
2000	The Spring	Emma Baker	TV movie
2000	Screwed	News Reporter	
2001	Camouflage	Stage Woman	
2001	Replicant	Downtown Mother Victim	
2001	Seeking Winonas	Winona #1	Video
2003	Before I Say Goodbye	Bank Manager	TV movie
2004	Man Without a Name	Martina Schick	
2004	Walking Tall	Casino Waitress	
2004	Man in the Mirror: The Michael Jackson Story	Debbie Rowe	TV movie
2005	White Noise	John's Secretary	
2005	The Brotherhood IV: The Complex	Captain Arabella Morrissey	Video
2005	Behind the Camera: The Unauthorized Story of Mork & Mindy	Woman In Bungalow 5	TV movie
2005	Third Man Out	Alice Savage	TV movie
2005	Two for the Money	Young Woman	
2005	His and Her Christmas	Sarah	TV movie
2006	Flight 93	Lyz Glick	TV movie
2006	Gray Matters	Lana Valentine	
2009	Mr. Troop Mom	Denise	TV movie
2009	The Building	Maria	TV movie
2010	Growing the Big One	Marie	TV movie
2010	Amazon Falls	Jana	
2011	Taken from Me: The Tiffany Rubin Story	Elle	TV movie
2012	Radio Rebel	Delilah	TV movie
2012	Duke	Cami	TV movie
2012	How to Fall in Love	Meredith	TV movie
2012	Love at the Thanksgiving Day Parade	Donna	TV movie
2013	She Made Them Do It	Mimi	TV movie
2013	Stalkers	Anita	TV movie
2013	Midnight Rider	Belinda Chaney	
2013	Leap 4 Your Life	Maureen	
2013	Christmas Bounty	Gale Bell	TV movie
2014	Happy Face Killer	Wanda	TV movie
2014	Signed, Sealed, Delivered for Christmas	Miss Hodges	TV movie
2014	Santa Hunters	Natasha	TV movie
2014	Earthlickers	Goddess C	Short
2015	The Unauthorized Beverly Hills, 90210 Story	Casting Director	TV movie
2016	Bei Jing yu shang Xi Ya Tu 2	Mrs. Taylor	
2016	Unclaimed	Roxy	TV movie
2016	A December Bride	Darcy	TV movie
2017	Little Pink House	Nurse	
2017	Limina	Thelma	Short
2017	Big Fat Liar 2	Judy	
2017	The Cannon	Tess Ollarch	
2017	Medical Drama	-	Short
2017	Heart of Clay	Corrine	
2018	Reap What You Sew: An Aurora Teagarden Mystery	Nicole Wilson	TV movie
2018	Bella Ciao!	Professor	
2018	Mingle All the Way	Erica Fielding	TV movie
2019	Love and Sunshine	Donna	TV movie
2019	Holiday Date	Emily's Mother	TV movie
2019	It's Beginning to Look a Lot Like Christmas	Maureen	TV movie
2020	Chris Watts: Confessions of a Killer	Amber	TV movie
2020	Not Your Average Bear	Woman	Short
2020	A Babysitter's Guide to Monster Hunting	Zellman's Secretary	
2020	Christmas She Wrote	Amy	TV movie
2021	Ann Rule's Circle of Deception	Janice	TV movie
2021	A Cinderella Story: Starstruck	Valerian	
2021	Time for Them to Come Home for Christmas	Roberta	TV movie
2022	Brazen	Lisa Clark	
2022	Cut, Color, Murder	Olivia Stevens	TV movie
2022	Just One Kiss	Sheila	TV movie
2022	Big Sky River	Kendra	TV movie
2023	Love on Your Doorstep	Michelle Woodford	TV movie
2023	A Picture of Her	Claire	TV movie
2023	Boy in the Walls	Chief Watkins	
2023	Big Sky River: The Bridal Path	Kendra	TV movie
2023	A World Record Christmas	Jane Gulsvig	TV movie
2024	Gilded Newport Mysteries: Murder at the Breakers	Aunt Alice	TV movie
2024	Spread	Deb	
2025	Final Destination Bloodlines	Brenda Campbell	

=== Television ===
Year	Title	Role	Notes
1995	The Marshal	Verona	Episode: "The Show"
1996	Sliders	Honey Sue	Episode: "The Good, the Bad and the Wealthy"
1996	Highlander: The Series	Roxanne	Episode: "Dramatic License"
1996	Viper	Amanda	Episode: "Talk Is Cheap"
1996	The Outer Limits	Young Lucy	Episode: "Paradise"
1996	Millennium	Calamity	Episode: "Pilot"
1997	Dead Man's Gun	Brittany	Episode: "The Great McDonacle"
1997	Viper	Hostess	Episode: "Black Box"
1997	Madison	Daisy Lamont	Episode: "Opportunity Knocks"
1997–1998	Super Dave's All Stars	Miss Super Dave Contestant	Recurring Cast
1998	The Sentinel	Susan Tanner	Episode: "Neighborhood Watch"
1998	Sleepwalkers	Kimberly Daniels	Episode: "A Matter of Fax"
1998	Cold Squad	Doreen Nolan	Episode: "Merv Doucette"
1998	The Net	Greta	Episode: "Lucy's Life"
1999	The New Addams Family	Alex Banning	Episode: "Green Eyed Gomez"
1999	The Outer Limits	Shirley Baxter	Episode: "What Will The Neighbors Think"
1999	The Crow: Stairway to Heaven	Lily	Episode: "Brother's Keeper"
1999	Millennium	Elizabeth 'Liddy' Hooper	Episode: "Nostalgia"
1999	Beggars and Choosers	Fran	Recurring Cast: Season 1
2000	The Hunger	Alissa Dunlap	Episode: "Approaching Desdemona"
2000	Secret Agent Man	Charlene/Lucy	Episode: "WhupSumAss" & "Sleepers"
2000	Hollywood Off-Ramp	Naughty Rosemary Riding Hood	Episode: "Lights, Camera, Reaction"
2000–2001	The Immortal	Dr. Sara Beckman	Main Cast
2001	First Wave	Gibson	Episode: "Black Box"
2002	Special Unit 2	Miss Understanding	Episode: "The Piper"
2002	Body & Soul	Shoshana White Deer	Episode: "Saviors"
2004	Dead Like Me	Elvira Mom	Episode: "Haunted"
2005	Young Blades	Maid Isabelle	Episode: "Four Musketeers and a Baby"
2005	Stargate SG-1	Sallis	Episode: "Avalon: Part 2" & "Origin"
2006	The Collector	Darla Gunn	Episode: "The Chef"
2006	Whistler	Rose	Episode: "Scratching the Surface"
2007	The L Word	Nell	Episode: "Lassoed"
2007	Tin Man	Prostitute	Episode: "Into the Storm"
2007–2008	Aliens in America	Leslie Becker	Recurring Cast
2007–2008	Robson Arms	Sasha Kowalski	Recurring Cast: Season 2, Guest: Season 3
2008	Men in Trees	Pushy Broad	Episode: "Get a Life"
2009	Reaper	Phyllis	Episode: "My Brother's Reaper"
2010	Shattered	Donna Bishop	Episode: "The Sins of Fathers"
2011	Endgame	Lilly Palmera	Episode: "Turkish Hold'em"
2011	Health Nutz	German Woman	Episode: "Good News, Bad News"
2011	R.L. Stine's The Haunting Hour	Female TV Host	Episode: "Sick"
2011	Supernatural	Darla	Episode: "Frontierland"
2011–2012	Hell on Wheels	Nell	Recurring Cast: Season 1-2
2013–2020	Garage Sale Mysteries	Various Roles	Recurring Cast
2014	Strange Empire	Constance Fogg	Recurring Cast
2014–2017	Rogue	Donna	Recurring Cast: Season 2-4
2016	Supernatural	Etta Fraser	Episode: "The Chitters"
2017	Frequency	Christa Hurley	Recurring Cast
2017	Date My Dad	Claire	Recurring Cast
2018	Sacred Lies	Dawn Matthews	Recurring Cast: Season 1
2019	Project Blue Book	Dorothy York	Episode: "The Scoutmaster"
2019	Pup Academy	Headmistress Felicia	Episode: "Kitten Academy"
2020	Picture Perfect Mysteries	Sara Khan	Episode: "Exit, Stage Death"
2021	Scaredy Cats	Sneak	Main Cast
2022	Phantom Pups	Mom (Baddies)	Recurring Cast
2023	Fire Country	Dolly Burnett	Episode: "Mama Bear"

=== Video game ===
Year	Title	Role
2016	Dead Rising 4	Survivors - Female (voice)
