= Happy Face Killer (film) =

2014 film about serial killer Keith Jesperson

- Genre: True crime
- Written by: Richard Christian Matheson
- Directed by: Rick Bota
- Starring: David Arquette; Gloria Reuben; Daryl Shuttleworth; Stefanie von Pfetten; Josh Blacker
- Theme music composer: Hal Beckett; Marc Baril
- Countries of origin: United States; Canada
- Original language: English

Production
- Producers: Tom Patricia; Harvey Kahn
- Cinematography: Adam Sliwinski
- Editor: Gordon Rempel
- Running time: 83 minutes
- Production companies: Happy Face Productions; Front Street Pictures

Original release
- Network: Lifetime
- Release: March 1, 2014

Happy Face Killer is a 2014 television film inspired by real-life events of the hunt and capture of serial killer Keith Hunter Jesperson. The film premiered on March 1, 2014, on the Lifetime network and starred David Arquette as Jesperson. Gloria Reuben played Melinda Gand, the lead FBI case investigator.

== Plot ==
Over the course of two years, Keith Jesperson (David Arquette), a long-haul truck driver, kills at least eight women, following his failed marriage and an injury which prevented him from joining the Royal Canadian Mounted Police. He meets his first victim in a Portland, Oregon bar and kills her after an argument in his rented home. When Delores Parnicke falsely confesses to committing the murder with her boyfriend, Jesperson sends disturbing letters to the press and even writes confessions on the wall of a highway rest stop and at the body dumps. He signs his notes with a smiley face, earning himself the nickname, "Happy Face Killer", as he resumes his killing spree.

Jesperson is being tracked by FBI Agent Melinda Gand (Gloria Reuben) and Ruskin County Sheriff (Daryl Shuttleworth), with little help from the district attorney after Parnicke confesses to the first murder. It is not until a young mother comes forward to say Jesperson assaulted her, and his new fiancée Diane Loftin (Stefanie von Pfetten) disappears, that he can finally be apprehended. (Note: This film was "inspired by" Jesperson's story. All the names, except his, are fictional.)

== Cast ==
=== Main ===
- David Arquette as Keith Jesperson
- Gloria Reuben as FBI agent-in-charge Melinda Gand
- Daryl Shuttleworth as Sheriff J. D. Cotton, the Ruskin County, Washington, sheriff
- Stefanie von Pfetten as Diane Loftin, Keith's fiancée and last victim
- Josh Blacker as Peter Anselo, Gand's fellow FBI agent

=== Supporting ===
- Melissa Montgomery as Felicia Boones, Cotton's administrative assistant
- Emily Haine as Sissy Peyton, Keith's first victim
- Jordana Largy as Candy Smith, a young mother who was released by Keith
- Mittita Barber as Summer Northern, Keith's second victim
- Kelly-Ruth Mercier as Delores Parnicke
- David Pearson as Dez Whitman, Keith's dispatcher
- Vanessa Walsh as Taffy Billings, who teased Keith at a truck stop and later became his seventh victim
- Peter Flemming as John Jesperson, Keith's brother
- Spencer Drever as young Keith Jesperson
- Kurt Evans as District Attorney Levi Mayford
- Karyn Mott as Becky Sue Bailing, Keith's fourth victim
- Darren McGee as Bud Skinner, Delores's boyfriend
- Jodi Thompson as Cora Jesperson, Keith's ex-wife and mother of his children
- April Telek as Wanda, Dez's administrative assistant

== Production ==
The film is produced by Happy Face Productions/Front Street Pictures, executive produced by Tom Patricia and produced by Harvey Kahn. The script was written by Richard Christian Matheson and directed by Rick Bota.

In October 2013, David Arquette was cast in the lead role of serial killer Keith Hunter Jesperson. Filming began in Vancouver, British Columbia, Canada, in November 2013. In a Lifetime interview, Arquette spoke about getting into character to portray Jesperson: "I got into character by researching of course but also by tapping into that dark side of mankind. It's all around us so it's easy to see and feel. I would try to understand why he did certain things the way he would. For instance, if someone is rude or belittles you, most people would get upset or yell back at them, Keith would lash out. There were times while filming when something like that would happen and I could picture what he would have done and that becomes very scary to know that people like that are out there and think in those terms".

== Reception ==
=== Ratings ===
In its original airing on March 1, 2014, Happy Face Killer was watched by 2.02 million viewers and received a 0.46 rating in the 18-49 age demographic.

=== Critical reception ===
Jean Bentley of Zap2it's "From Inside the Box" called Happy Face Killer "truly disturbing". She added, "As far as Lifetime movies go, this one was pretty middle-of-the-road. No performances were outrageously campy — though all low-budget thrillers on this network seem to have some level of cheesiness to them. Gloria Reuben was certainly believable as a tough FBI investigator chasing after Jesperson, and the scenes of David Arquette strangling women were truly terrifying".
