= Sebastian Spence =

Canadian actor

- Born: December 9, 1969 (age 56); St. John's, Newfoundland, Canada
- Occupation: Actor
- Years active: 1992–present

Sebastian Spence (born December 9, 1969) is a Canadian actor. He played the lead role of Cade Foster in the Space Channel science fiction television series First Wave (1998–2001).

== Early life ==
Spence was born in St. John's, Newfoundland, to Michael Cook and Janis Spence, both playwrights. His first professional acting job was at age 16, in a play written by his mother.

== Career ==
Spence's first on-camera role was in second part of the Canadian television miniseries The Boys of St. Vincent, which was well-received by critics. His next role was in the trilogy of A Family of Cops television films with Charles Bronson, playing Eddie Fein the younger son of Bronson's character.

Spence's first film role was in the futuristic Anchor Zone, which was filmed in his native Newfoundland. He performed in a substantial role in the film Drive, She Said in 1997; the film's storyline and staging were criticized by reviewers. Spence's first leading role was as Cade Foster, in the Space Channel (and later Sci-Fi Channel) original series First Wave, which ran between 1998 and 2001.

Spence played the role of Cliff Harting on the Hallmark Channel drama Cedar Cove, between 2013 and 2015.

== Filmography ==
=== Television ===
Year	Title	Role	Notes
1993	The Boys of St. Vincent: 15 Years Later	Kevin Reevey age 25	Television miniseries (Part 2)
1994–1995	Madison	Cal Sharpe	4 episodes
1995	Robin's Hoods		Episode: "Rock and a Hard Place "
1996	The Outer Limits	Young Gerry	Episode: "Paradise"
1996	The X Files	Deputy Barney Paster	Episode: "Home"
1997	Dead Man's Gun	Willy	Episode chapter: "My Brother's Keeper"; Television film & backdoor pilot
1997	Poltergeist: The Legacy	Noah Wilkes	Episode: "The Devil's Lighthouse"
1997–1998	Fast Track	Stevie Servine	23 episodes
1998–2001	First Wave	Cade Foster	66 episodes
2001	Dark Angel	Charles Smith	Episode: "Hit a Sista Back"
2001	Special Unit 2	Ian	Episode: "The Rocks"
2001	Strange Frequency	Brad	Episode: "Don't Fear the Reaper"
2002	Dawson's Creek	Professor Matt Freeman	5 episodes
2002	Glory Days	Greg Embry	Episode: "The Lost Girls"
2003	Mutant X	Noel	Episode: "Under the Cloak of War"
2003	Andromeda	Patrius	Episode: "Conduit to Destiny"
2004	Stargate SG-1	Delek	Episode: "Death Knell"
2004	Bliss	Cable Guy	Episode: "Penelope and Her Suitors"
2005	The Collector	The Devil/Dr. Burruss	Episode: "The Pharmacist"
2005	Young Blades	Don Marco	Episode: "Four Musketeers and a Baby"
2005	Category 7: The End of the World	FPS Agent Gavin Carr	Television miniseries
2005–2006	G-Spot	Paul	9 episodes
2005–2009	Battlestar Galactica	Noel "Narcho" Allison	9 episodes
2006	Supernatural	Tom	2 episodes
2010	Republic of Doyle	Bobby Maher	Episode: "Blood is Thicker Than Blood"
2011	Smallville	Ted Kord	Episode: "Booster"
2013	Psych	Mayor Gavin Channing	Episode: "Santa Barbarian Candidate"
2013–2015	Cedar Cove	Cliff Harting	29 episodes
2018	Taken	Senator Warren	Episode: "Charm School"
2019–2023	Murdoch Mysteries	Allen Templeton	4 episodes
2024	Mayday	NTSB Investigator	Episode: "Deadly Departure"

=== Film ===
Year	Title	Role	Notes
1994	Anchor Zone	Duke	
1995	Family of Cops	Eddie Fein	TV film
1997	Drive, She Said	Jonathan Evans	
1997	Breach of Faith: A Family of Cops II	Eddie Fein	TV film
1998	Firestorm	Cowboy	
1999	Family of Cops III: Under Suspicion	Eddie Fein	TV film
1999	Little Boy Blues	That Guy	
2002	First Shot	Owen Taylor	TV film
2003	A Crime of Passion	Dale	TV film
2003	The Lone Ranger	Harmon Hartman	TV film, series pilot
2004	The Clinic	Kyle Southern	TV film
2004	Eve's Christmas	Scott	TV film
2005	Criminal Intent	Devon Major	TV film
2005	Cerberus	Jake Addams	TV film
2005	Paper Moon Affair	Vern Staub	
2005	Third Man Out	Timmy Callahan	TV film
2006	A Bug and a Bag of Weed	Frehley	
2006	Shock to the System	Timmy Callahan	TV film
2006	The Obsession	Reed Halton	TV film
2006	To Have and to Hold	Tom Davidson	TV film
2007	Crossing	Daniel Cimmerman	Also known as Dress to Kill
2007	Uncaged Heart	Robert Moss	Television film; also known as Passion's Web
2008	Daniel's Daughter	Connor Bailey	TV film
2008	On the Other Hand, Death	Timmy Callahan	TV film
2008	Ice Blues	Timmy Callahan	TV film
2008	NYC: Tornado Terror	Jim Lawrence	TV film
2009	Dr. Dolittle: Million Dollar Mutts	Chad Cassidy	Direct-to-video
2011	Crash Site	Daniel Saunders	Also known as Crash Site: A Family in Danger
2012	Battlestar Galactica: Blood & Chrome	Lt. Jim "Sunshine" Kirby	TV film
2012	A Mother's Nightmare	Steve	TV film
2013	12 Rounds 2: Reloaded	Governor Devlin Weaver	Direct-to-video
2013	Stonados	Lee Carton	TV film
2013	Wolverine: Origin	John Howlett Jr. (voice)	Direct-to-video
2013	Ultimate Wolverine vs. Hulk	Dr. Bruce Banner	Direct-to-video
2014	My Mother's Future Husband	Andrew	TV film
2014	Stolen from the Womb	Rob King	TV film
2015	Accidental Obsession	Ray Johnson	TV film
2015	Driven Underground	Tom Wilcox	TV film
2016	A Wife's Suspicion	Kyle	TV film
