= Sebastien Roberts =

Canadian actor

- Born: Sébastien Robert; Montreal, Quebec, Canada
- Occupation: Actor
- Years active: 2000–present
- Children: 1

Sebastien Roberts is a French-Canadian actor of television and film, working in both French and English projects since 2000.

== Acting work ==
Film appearances include the TV series Northern Rescue on CBC Television and Netflix and Mary Kills People on Hulu. Roberts also works in French productions, his latest being four seasons of the TV show O; as well as a new character introduced in season five of the hit French series, Unité 9. His role as a rapist, Anthony Burk, in the English/German film One Way (2006) with Til Schweiger, Eric Roberts and Michael Clarke Duncan caught people's attention due to the graphic rape scenes. He made appearances in the films Lucky Number Slevin (2006) and Black Swarm (2007); the TV-mini-series documentary, Canada Russia '72 (2006) as Rod Gilbert; and the made for TV mystery, Ice Blues (2008).

== Filmography ==
Year	Film	Role	Other notes
2001	La journée avant	Max	
2005	The Rocket	Bob Fillion	(billed as Sébastien Roberts)
2006	The Last Sect	Sam	
2006	One Way	Anthony Birk	
2006	Lucky Number Slevin	The Guy	
2008	Ice Blues	Frank Zaillian	
2010	L'anniversaire	Cole	(Short)
2011	Faces in the Crowd	Stranger / Lurker at start-up party	
2011	Hellraiser: Revelations	Peter Bradley	
2012	Two Hands to Mouth	Derek Whitefield	
2015	19-2: 10-4 Over	Robin Beaucage	(Video short)
2016	Ainsi soit-elle (Be her)	Paul	(Short)
2023	Mercy	Ellis	
Year	Television series	Role	Other notes
2001	Tribu.com	Bobby	TV series, 1 episode
2002	Lance et compte - Nouvelle génération	Roberts	TV series, 1 episode
2003	L'auberge du chien noir	Angelo	TV series, 3 episodes
2004	15/Love	Francois Cochet	TV series, 1 episode
2004	False Pretenses	Assistant	(TV movie)
2004	Virginie		TV series, 1 episode
2004	Lance et compte: La reconquête	Roberts	TV series, 1 episode
2004	Temps dur		TV series, 1 episode
2004	The Last Casino	Orr's Bouncer	(TV movie), billed as Sébastien Roberts
2004	Fries with That?		TV series, 1 episode
2004-2005	Les Bougon: C'est aussi ça la vie	Policier	TV series, 2 episodes
2005	Les ex	Benoit	TV series, 1 episode
2005-2006	Providence	Francois Berthier or François Berthier	TV series, 37 episodes
2006	Canada Russia '72	Rod Gilbert	TV series, 1 episode
2006	Naked Josh	Jeremey Falcon	TV series, 1 episode
2006	G-Spot	Gary	TV series, 2 episodes, billed as Sébastien Roberts
2007	Black Swarm	Devin Hall / Dan Hall	(TV movie)
2009	Encounter with Danger	Carter	(TV movie), billed as Sébastien Roberts
2009	Final Verdict	Ray Voss	(TV movie)
2010	Nikita	Daniel Monroe	TV series, 2 episodes
2010-2011	Mauvais Karma	Shawn Parker	TV series, 21 episodes
2011	30 Vies	Russel Belanger	TV series, 5 episodes
2011	Mirador	Russell Dayan	TV series, 1 episode, billed as Sébastien Roberts
2011	Against the Wall	Jeff Briggs	TV series, 1 episode
2011	The Listener	Dr. Shane Lawson	TV series, 1 episode
2012	Republic of Doyle	Guy Racicot	TV series, 1 episode
2012	Being Human	Will	TV series, 1 episode
2012-2016	O'	Jean-Seb	TV series, 47 episodes
2013	Played	Joe Kane	TV series, 1 episode
2013	Le gentleman	Ludger Forget	TV series, 4 episodes
2013	Seed	Aaron	TV series, 1 episode
2014	Trauma	Derek Perreault	TV series, 9 episodes
2015	Good Witch	Mark	TV series, 2 episodes
2015	19-2	Robin Beaucage	TV series, 3 episodes
2016	19-2	Dr. James Conroy	TV series, 2 episodes
2017	Unité 9	Patrick	TV series, 3 episodes
2017-2018	Mary Kills People	Kevin	TV series, 9 episodes
2018	Mr. D	Donald T. Franklin	TV series, 1 episode
2019	Private Eyes	Riley Larson	TV series, 1 episode
2019	Northern Rescue	Alex / Alex Turner	TV series, 8 episodes
