= Deadly Sins (film) =

- Directed by: Michael Robison
- Written by: Malcolm Barbour; John Langley
- Produced by: James Shavick
- Starring: David Keith; Alyssa Milano
- Distributed by: WarnerVision Films
- Release date: October 17, 1995
- Running time: 98 minutes
- Countries: United States; Canada
- Language: English

Deadly Sins is a 1995 American-Canadian slasher film directed by Michael Robison, and stars David Keith and Alyssa Milano. It had a limited VHS release. In Germany, the film was released on VHS under the title Sins.

== Plot ==
The story begins with the discovery of Gwendolyn 'Gwen' Jones (April Telek), a student at an Eau Claire, Wisconsin Catholic school, who is found dead, hanged from the church bells. Over the last five years, eleven girls have disappeared from the school under mysterious circumstances. Deputy Sheriff Jack Gates (David Keith) is sent from Seattle to investigate the growing string of deaths. Upon his arrival, Jack is frustrated to learn that the body of Gwen has already been examined by the inexperienced local doctor, and it has been quickly removed.

Cristina Herrera (Alyssa Milano), the school’s secretary and history teacher, is assigned by Mother Superior (Pamela Perry) to assist Jack with the investigation. Jack becomes especially interested in a stolen cross that was reported along with Gwen's death, as well as the strange rumors surrounding the school’s history and the mysterious figure of Mother Bernadette, the former mother superior, whose spirit is said to haunt the place.

As the investigation progresses, Jack uncovers the disturbing history of the school. He learns that the spirit of Mother Bernadette is kept alive by the school's teachings, and that the girls are taught she "is always with them." The school’s staff, including Headmaster Charles Gray (Peter Hanlon), and the students' behavior raise more questions than answers. Jack also learns of Beth (Corrie Clark), a popular but bullying student, who accuses Gray of impregnating Gwen. Meanwhile, other students, including Suzy Carroll (Jennifer Copping) and Marie (Heidi Lenhart), are stalked and murdered.

Jack begins to suspect that Headmaster Gray might be connected to the deaths, especially after discovering disturbing sex tapes of the missing girls. However, before Gray can be arrested, he kills himself. Jack is led to believe that the case is solved—until a new murder turns the investigation on its head.

As more murders occur, it becomes clear that the true killer is not Gray, but Emily (Ann Warn Pegg), the school’s cook. Cristina and Jack discover that Emily was trying to protect herself from the guilt of the school's "good girls," who she believed were being punished by the spirit of Mother Bernadette for their innocence.

The final twist occurs when Jack and Cristina uncover a hidden secret tunnel behind the confessional, leading them to a gruesome scene: the corpses of Mother Bernadette and the missing girls arranged in a macabre imitation of the Last Supper. As Jack is attacked and stabbed by Emily, Cristina manages to rescue him by dropping a cross from above, which kills Emily.

In the aftermath, Jack and Cristina conclude that Gwen’s death was indeed a suicide, and she was not a victim of Emily. The film ends with the disturbing realization that Emily’s motivations stemmed from the trauma of her stillborn child and her twisted view of protecting the girls from sin.

== Cast ==
- David Keith as Jack Gates
- Alyssa Milano as Cristina Herrera
- Terry David Mulligan as "Doc"
- Corrie Clark as Elizabeth "Beth"
- Heidi Lenhart as Marie
- Pamela Perry as Mother Superior
- Ann Warn Pegg as Emily
- Peter Hanlon as Headmaster Charles Gray
- Oliver Becker as Father Anthony
- Joely Collins as Polly
- Jennifer Copping as Suzy Carroll
- Jo Bates as Rita
- April Telek as Gwendolyn "Gwen" Jones
- Robert Jones as Billy
- Steve Bacic as Eric
- Mary McDonald as Mrs. Gray

== Production ==
The film was shot between August 20 and September 10, 1994.
