= Judah Katz =

Canadian actor

Judah Katz (born 23 June 1960) is a Canadian actor born in Montreal, Quebec. He has worked in Toronto and Los Angeles for more than 40 years, appearing in both TV series and films.

Winning a national "ACTRA Award" (now called a Canadian Screen Award) for his very first foray in front of a camera in 1983 as "best new actor in Canadian Television", he also received a Gemini Award (now called a Canadian Screen Award) for "best supporting actor" for his role as Alan Eagleson in the CBC mini-series Canada Russia '72.

Katz studied acting for two years at Vanier College and a further three years at the Dome Professional Theatre School. He has also studied at the Banff School of Fine Arts and with the "voice doctor" Robert Easton of Los Angeles. Method acting from 1992-1995 in the Master class and then privately with late renowned film and television acting coach and teacher David Rotenberg.

== Filmography ==
Year	Title	Role	Notes
1985	Movers & Shakers	Freddie	
1988	Switching Channels	Tillinger Sound Man	
1995	Moonlight and Valentino	Marc	
1996	Crash	Salesman	
1996	The Long Kiss Goodnight	Harry (Perkin's Aide)	
1996	Goosebumps	Dr. Brewer/Dr. Brewer's Clone	1 episode, Stay Out of the Basement
1999	Boy Meets World	Chadookie (uncredited)	2 episode, The Honeymooners
2000, 2002	Queer as Folk	Pancho Ryder, Marty Ryder	4 episodes
2001	XChange	Lister	
2003	Owning Mahowny	Broker	
2003	Spinning Boris	Michael Kramer	
2005	Cinderella Man	Reporter #4	
2006	Canada Russia '72	Alan Eagleson	TV miniseries
2010	Casino Jack	Abbe Lowell	
2011	Breakaway	Smitty	
2012	Wrath of Grapes: The Don Cherry Story II	Alan Eagleson	
2012	Blood Pressure	Mike Trestman	
2013	Jack	Brian Topp	
2014	Dr. Cabbie	James Whilcher	
2015	Gridlocked	Bill	
2016	Private Eyes	Jack Cutler	The Money Shot
2016, 2019, 2020	Mayday	Captain Yitzhak Fuchs, NTSB Investigator, TSB Investigator Cunningham	3 episodes, High Rise Catastrophe, Nuts and Bolts, Atlantic Ditching
2017	High-Rise Rescue	Clay Pellington	
