= Stefanie von Pfetten =

Canadian born actress (born 1973)

- Born: November 25, 1973 (age 52); Vancouver, British Columbia, Canada
- Occupation: Actress
- Years active: 1998–present

Stefanie Christina Baroness von Pfetten (born November 25, 1973) is a German-Canadian film and television actress.

== Early life ==
Stefanie von Pfetten was born in Vancouver, British Columbia. Her parents are Baron Hermann von Pfetten, from a line of German nobility, and his third wife, Heidrun Reel.

After high school, she went to Vienna, Austria. Later, she studied art history in Munich, Bavaria. For a short time, she worked for Sotheby's in Vienna. Back in Vancouver, she decided to become an actress.

== Acting career ==
While primarily appearing in television movies and single episodes of various series, von Pfetten may be best known for her main cast role as Dr. Daniella Ridley, in the first season of the CBC Television drama Cracked (2013).

== Filmography ==
=== Film ===
Year	Title	Role
1999	Little Boy Blues	Odette
2002	Posers	Love
2003	The Invitation	Anne Prescott
2004	Decoys	Lilly Benson
2004	Superbabies: Baby Geniuses 2	Jennifer Kraft
2006	One Way	Judy Birk
2008	Ba'al: The Storm God	Carol
2008	Odysseus and the Isle of the Mists	Persephone
2010	Icarus	Joey
2010	Percy Jackson & the Olympians: The Lightning Thief	Demeter
2015	Numb	Dawn
2016	Heaven's Floor	Carolyn
2017	While You Were Dating	Julia
2018	Welcome to Marwen	Wendy

=== Television ===
Year	Title	Role	Notes
1998	Welcome to Paradox	Julia	Episode: "Research Alpha"
1999	The Sentinel	Molly	Episode: "The Waiting Room"
1999	First Wave	Samantha Ray	Episode: "Deepthroat"
2001	Death Train to the Pacific		TV film
2001	These Arms of Mine	Lisa Patrick	2 episodes
2001	Seven Days	Camilla	Episode: "Sugar Mountain"
2001	Trapped	Rachel	TV film
2001	Strange Frequency	Nichole	Episode: "Soul Man"
2001	The Wedding Dress	Cass	TV film
2001	Point of View	Jane Bole	TV film
2002	Cabin Pressure	Brandee Caulfield	TV film
2002	The Twilight Zone	Nancy O'Brien	Episode: "Gabe's Story"
2002	Beyond Belief: Fact or Fiction		Episode: "Second Sight"
2003	A Date with Darkness: The Trial and Capture of Andrew Luster	Teri	TV film
2003	Jeremiah	Sandra	Episode: "The Past Is Prologue"
2004	Call Me: The Rise and Fall of Heidi Fleiss	Michelle	TV film
2004	CSI: Miami	Laurie Cofield	Episode: "The Oath"
2004	Andromeda	Nema	Episode: "Time Out of Mind"
2004	The Twelve Days of Christmas Eve	Rhianna	TV film
2005	Confessions of a Sociopathic Social Climber	Dove Greenstein	TV film
2005	Cool Money	Sabine Moreau	TV film
2005	The L Word	Kelly	Episode: "Lagrimas de Oro"
2005	Murder at the Presidio	Fran Atkins	TV film
2006	Battlestar Galactica	Capt. Marcia 'Showboat' Case	Episode: "The Captain's Hand"
2006	Meltdown: Days of Destruction	Carly	TV film
2007	Dragon Boys	Andrea	2 episodes
2007	Termination Point	Claire Smith	TV film
2007	Eureka	Wendy Whiticus	Episode: "Unpredictable"
2007	Battlestar Galactica: Razor	Capt. Marcia 'Showboat' Case	TV film
2007	Christmas Caper	Holly Barnes	TV film
2007	Holiday Switch	Sheila	TV film
2008	Ba'al	Carol	TV film
2008	Flirting with Forty	Nicole	TV film
2008	The Call	Anna Danville	TV film
2009	NCIS	Sara Korby	Episode: "Code of Conduct"
2009	Too Late to Say Goodbye	Jenn Corbin	TV film
2010	Better Off Ted	Greta	Episode: "Lust in Translation"
2011	Seeds of Destruction	Jocelyn	TV film
2012	Goodnight for Justice: The Measure of a Man	Callie Donohue	TV film
2013	Cracked	Dr. Daniella Ridley	Main cast (season 1)
2014	Happy Face Killer	Diane Loftin	TV film
2014	Far from Home	Libby Wainscott	TV film
2015	The Gourmet Detective: A Healthy Place to Die	Evelynn	TV film
2015–16	The Man in the High Castle	Katharina Wegener	2 episodes
2016	Shooter	Kasper	2 episodes
2017	Deadly Secrets by the Lake	Jennifer Riley	TV film
2017	The Last Tycoon	Marlene Dietrich	Episode: "Burying the Boy Genius"
2022	Legends of Tomorrow	Dr. Irina Petrov	Episode: "Paranoid Android"
2023	When Calls the Heart	Madeleine Saint John	Recurring role (season 10)
2024	Tracker	Rebecca Pendergast	Episode: "Missoula"
