= Richard Lipez =

American novelist (1938–2022)

- Born: Richard Stevenson Lipez; November 30, 1938; Lock Haven, Pennsylvania, U.S.
- Died: March 16, 2022 (aged 83); Becket, Massachusetts, U.S.
- Occupation: Novelist
- Spouse(s): Hedy Lipez (19??-1989; divorced) Joe Wheaton (m. 2004)
- Children: 2
- Writing career
- Pen name: Richard Stevenson
- Genres: Mystery, Detective fiction, Journalist, Columnist

Richard Stevenson Lipez (November 30, 1938 – March 16, 2022), commonly known by his pen name Richard Stevenson, was an American journalist and mystery author, most recently residing in Massachusetts. He was best known for his Donald Strachey mysteries.

Lipez was openly gay, and married his husband Joe Wheaton in 2004. He died from pancreatic cancer on March 16, 2022, at the age of 83.

== Awards ==
Year	Title	Award	Result	Ref.
1993	Third Man Out	Lambda Literary Award for Gay Mystery	Finalist	
1996	Shock to the System	Lambda Literary Award for Gay Mystery	Finalist	
1999	Strachey’s Folly	Lambda Literary Award for Gay Mystery	Finalist	
2011	Cockeyed	Lambda Literary Award for Gay Mystery	Finalist	
2011	Cockeyed	TLA Gaybie Award for Best Gay Mystery	Finalist	
2012	Red White Black and Blue	Lambda Literary Award for Gay Mystery	Winner	

== Publications ==
- Grand Scam, with Peter Stein (1980)

=== Donald Strachey Mysteries ===
1. Death Trick (1981)
2. On the Other Hand, Death (1984)
3. Ice Blues (1986)
4. Third Man Out (1992)
5. Shock to the System (1995)
6. Chain of Fools (1996)
7. Strachey's Folly (1998)
8. Tongue Tied (2003)
9. Death Vows (2008)
10. The 38 Million Dollar Smile (2009)
11. Cockeyed (2010)
12. Red White Black and Blue (2011)
13. The Last Thing I Saw (2012)
14. Why Stop at Vengeance (2015)
15. WWW.Dropdead (2016)
16. Killer Reunion (2019)
17. Chasing Rembrandt (2023)

Clifford Waterman

1. Knock Off the Hat (2022)

== Filmography ==
- Third Man Out (2005)
- Shock to the System (2006)
- On the Other Hand, Death (2008)
- Ice Blues (2008)
