= On the Other Hand, Death =

- Written by: Gillian Horvath; Ron McGee
- Directed by: Ron Oliver
- Starring: Chad Allen; Sebastian Spence; Margot Kidder; Daryl Shuttleworth
- Music by: Peter Allen
- Countries of origin: Canada; United States
- Original language: English

Production
- Producers: Paul Colichman; Stephen P. Jarchow; James Shavick
- Cinematography: C. Kim Miles
- Running time: 85 minutes
- Budget: Gross: $2,892

Original release
- Release: 2008

Related
- Shock to the System; Ice Blues

On the Other Hand, Death is a 2008 gay-themed mystery film. It is the third film adaptation of a Richard Stevenson novel featuring fictional detective Donald Strachey. The film was screened at several LGBT film festivals, including the New York Lesbian, Gay, Bisexual, & Transgender Film Festival, 2008 before going into rotation on the here! television network. The film was nominated for the GLAAD Media Award for Outstanding TV Movie or Limited Series.

== Plot ==
Private Investigator Donald Strachey is under the impression he is tailing an unfaithful housewife for evidence that she is cheating on her husband, but it turns out that the "housewife" is actually an undercover cop who promptly arrests him. After six hours of questioning, the cop, Officer Gina Santer, and Detective 'Bub' Bailey let him go, but instruct him to turn over any information he obtains on the client that claimed Santer was his wife. Most of the info on file at Strachey Investigations about this mystery client is fake. Meanwhile, at the home of Dorothy 'Dot' Fisher and her partner Edith Strong, Dorothy chases out a vandal after he breaks into their home and spray paints homophobic graffiti on their wall. The next day, Andrew McWhirter, close friend of Fisher and Strong—and Timmy Callhan's former boyfriend—introduce Donald and Timmy to the lesbian couple after a contentious school board meeting at which Dorothy, a guidance counselor at the school, is placed on paid leave due to objections from a homophobic parent whose gay son Derek has been counseled by Fisher. The two are invited by the women and houseguest Andrew back to their home in Hollis, but the socialization is interrupted when the returning vandal throws a brick through the window. Strachey chases him back to his car, but the license plate is obscured by mud.

The following day, Kenny gives Don pictures he obtained of the mysterious "client", and his e-mail address, the one piece of info he offered about himself that is at least a marginal lead. With no other pressing cases, Strachey returns to Hollis, investigating motives for the vandalism. Dorothy suspects the homophobic Joey Deems, who attends the school he works at, but his father Carl tells Donald that he believes the motive is more likely a resentful backlash against Fisher's decision not to sell her house to Millipond Realty, who wants to build a large mall along Moon Road, the street the Deems, Dot & Edith, and other residents, who all received offers on their properties, live on.

Strachey manages to discover a connection between Millipond and Colter Investigations, a rival P.I. firm. That night, after an abortive attempt by Andrew to seduce Donald, close to the Fisher home, a fire breaks out inside their barn. Upon investigation, Donald also discovers a body in the barn, which later turns out to be that of Leo Colter, the head of the aforementioned P.I. firm. Strachey sneaks into the Colter offices and purloins some sensitive files. Later, he exchanges the faux client's e-mail address for a copy of the autopsy report on Colter's body, courtesy of Bailey.

In Hollis, a distraught Derek visits Dorothy in a desperate plea for help, but his father Jonas arrives, and informs Fisher she can now expect to have her position with the school fully terminated. Donald discusses the results of the autopsy report with Dorothy and warns her that he suspects foul play, and that Dorothy may have to contend with even more than the loss of her job and the barrage of vandalism and arson. Strachey's visit is cut short by a call from Kenny, who has been tailing Santer as part of his field experience requirements. He discovers that Santer has been having coffee with the same mysterious "client" that hired Donald to track her under false pretenses. Donald returns to Albany in time to observe both participants in the coffee date going their separate ways. Kenny manages to stick with Santer, but Strachey's attempts to tail the mystery guy are derailed by one of his former disgruntled clients. Coming up with a Plan B, Donald joins Kenny at Sturgis Development, which was Santer's destination. She is working undercover, investigating allegations of fraud. She tells him his mystery client's name-Peter Garritty, who is also in the real estate business.

Sensing that things aren't adding up, Donald interrupts a lunch date between Tim and his former flame, outright accusing Andrew of being involved in the shady dealings he's uncovered. A defensive McWhirter denies knowing Garritty, and shoots back that Donald is still pissed for the pass Andrew made earlier. Tim, who was unaware of the incident until now, runs out of his office, but Donald assures him that the attraction—and "action" the previous night—weren't mutual, and that he doesn't even trust McWhirter, let alone like him.

Back in Hollis, Strachey presses Dorothy on the lack of records about "Edith Strong" before 1972. Later, Strachey talks to "Edith" alone; she breaks down and confesses the details of her past to him. Her birth name was Laura Whitaker. As a young girl, she, like Dorothy, was an activist. During an attempt to protest the Vietnam War, a planned bombing of an empty courthouse went terribly wrong, accidentally killing a close friend of Laura's. Furthermore, Edith/Laura knows that Joey Deems has been vandalizing her and Dorothy's home—because she asked him to do it. Not too long ago, a man called her and threatened to expose her to the police and Dorothy if she failed to convince her stubborn partner to sell their home. Later, Edith finds out that Dorothy has already known about her past as Laura for some time now, and it changed nothing as far as Dot's feelings for her or their relationship was concerned. Dot suddenly yells for help, letting Strachey know that Andrew has apparently been kidnapped, as per a video clip e-mailed to her showing him being held hostage and ending with a demand for a $500,000 ransom. Strachey, with Santer's assistance, arranges for Sturgis to buy out Dot and Edith's home at the steeply overvalued price of half a million dollars, which would enable the couple to meet the ransom demand.

Strachey then breaks into Garritty's office, uncovering a much broader conspiracy that is appearing to link all the players he has met so far in some way, one centered on various parties outmaneuvering each other until the winner is able to cash in on the lucrative deal to sell all the properties along Moon Road—a deal worth a total of $40 million—but his research is interrupted by Garritty's arrival. Strachey surprises Garritty and persuades him to answer many of his questions, but this is also interrupted—by gunshots fired by an unknown assailant. Garritty uses the distraction to evade further interrogation by the P.I.

After another session with Carl Deems in which he is more forthcoming about his frustration with Fisher's resistance to the Moon Road real estate deal, blocking his ambition to sell his own property, Donald discovers Carl's clearly closeted son Joey being intimate with his openly gay classmate Derek. Joey confesses to vandalizing Dorothy's house, but truthfully denies being involved with the later fire, let alone Colter's murder.

Game time arrives. As the midnight deadline for the ransom money approaches, Santer arrives at Dot and Edith's place with the money in cash, courtesy of Sturgis. Strachey catches Santer off guard, tricking her into admitting (with a nearby Garritty listening) that she plans to cut him out the profitable real estate deal. Garritty emerges from hiding amongst the bushes, objecting to the ad hoc ruse, after which Santer reveals herself as an undercover cop. Strachey then confronts her with his knowledge of her attempt on Garritty's life hours earlier, as well as her murdering of Colter. The P.I. then exposes Andrew's collusion with Garritty as well, having unearthed that the kidnapping was entirely staged, leading McWhirter, who is also hiding nearby, to show himself. The greedy Santer and Garritty, both armed, shoot each other, leaving McWhirter to take the cash. Strachey chases him into the barn and confronts him for hurting Dot and Edith—he was the mystery blackmailer. McWhirter gets the drop on Strachey and is about to shoot him, but Dot is close by, and hits him from behind with a softball bat.

The next day Donald finally breaks through to Jonas by showing him autopsy pictures of young suicides, warning him that Derek could wind up the same way without his help. Strachey gives him a card for The Trevor Project, which Jonas rejected as a recruiting tool for homosexuals when Dot referred Derek to it earlier, but now accepts as a valid source of psychological assistance, leading him and his son to reconcile and likely avoiding the fate Donald warned of. Back home, as Donald and Tim put this latest case behind them, they discuss Dot's reinstatement to her position at the school and a plea bargain that should make it so the worst Edith will have to endure is a year of house arrest, which she will get through fine with Dot by her side.

== Cast ==
- Chad Allen as Donald Strachey
- Sebastian Spence as Timmy Callahan
- Nelson Wong as Kenny Kwon
- Daryl Shuttleworth as Detective "Bub" Bailey
- Margot Kidder as Dorothy Fisher
- Damon Runyan as Andrew McWhirter
- Lori Ann Triolo as Gina Santer
- Gabrielle Rose as Edith Strong / Laura Whitaker
- David Orth as Peter Garrity
- Kerry James as Joey Deems
- Barclay Hope as Carl Deems
- William MacDonald as Jonas Baskin
- Ralph Alderman as Sheriff Reg Howard
- Keegan Macintosh as Derek Baskin
- Sean Allen as Crane Sturgis
- Lisa Bunting as School Board Member
- Cali Boyle as Sturgis Receptionist

== Continuity ==
The setting for much of this film, Hollis, is a fictional town presumably located 20–25 miles from Albany. In the original novel the movie was adapted from, Moon Road was located in West Albany (which is not actually part of Albany proper). Hollis is meant to be a modern-day rural town that is meant to hold onto the conservative social conditions (which would have been found in the mid-1990s), combined with the sense of declining population and industry actually found in reality in West Albany which was ripe for the investment deal that made up the bulk of the premise the story's plot hinges on.
