= Tony Dean Smith =

South African film director (born 1977)

- Born: 12 October 1977; Johannesburg
- Citizenship: South Africa
- Occupation(s): screenwriter, film director and editor

Tony Dean Smith (born 12 October 1977) is a screenwriter, director and editor for film and television.

Smith was born in Johannesburg, South Africa. He currently lives in Vancouver, British Columbia.

An award-winning graduate of the Vancouver Film School, he was selected to be one of five directors for the Directors Guild of Canada 'KickStart' 2003 program, resulting in Best Short Film Leo Award for his film, Reflection, 2004.

Smith has directed numerous episodes for the television series Robson Arms, written and directed the Whistler Webisodes and co-directed the comedy Summerhood (written and directed by Jacob Medjuck).

He is the director and co-writer of the science-fiction feature film Volition.

As a picture editor for film, TV and music videos, Smith's editing has received awards, nominations and numerous festival entries.

Starting from the third installment, he has edited or co-edited every installment of the Signed, Sealed, Delivered movie series.

== Filmography ==
- The Other Side of Being (2000)
- Reflection (2004)
- Summerhood (2008) (Co-Director)
- The Christmas Train (2017) (television film)
- The Killer Downstairs (2019) (television film)
- Love Under the Rainbow (2019) (television film)
- Volition (2019)
- Aurora Teagarden Mysteries: How to Con a Con (2021) (television film)
- Mercy (2023)
- Strangers (2025)
