= Archer season 12 =

Season of television series

Archer
- Season 12
- No. of episodes: 8

Release
- Original network: FXX
- Original release: August 25 – October 6, 2021

Season chronology
- ← Previous; Season 11 Next → Season 13

The twelfth season of the animated television series Archer, created by Adam Reed, aired on FXX from August 25 to October 6, 2021.

== Production ==
This is the last season to feature Jessica Walter in her role as Malory Archer. Walter died after recording her voice parts for the season.

The episode "Mission: Difficult" is dedicated to her memory.

== Episodes ==
No. overall	No. in season	Title	Directed by	Written by	Original release date	Prod. code	US viewers (millions)
119	1	"Identity Crisis"	Matt Thompson	Shane Kosakowski	August 25, 2021	XAR012001	0.25
Although Archer and the gang have just saved the world from a nuclear catastrophe, they are almost out of funds. Malory fires the Cloudbeam marketing team she engaged to "brand" their business, but still uses their idea to apply for a valuable contract on the Global Spywire Website (GSW) to extricate a scientist named Colt and his prototype invention from Moldova. While Pam and Cheryl work on other branding ideas, the rest of the team fly to Moldova and stay in a rat-infested hotel while Fabian Kingsworth, the CEO of IIA has his crack team of professionals stay at an expensive hotel. Archer hatches a wild plan to steal an IIA helicopter and bullet-proof Hummer to rescue Colt. His plan works and they return with Colt although he is in a coma. Malory announces they have a new financial backer. Guest Stars: Eric André as Colt, Harvey Guillén as Alton, Kayvan Novak as Fabian Kingsworth, Natasha Rothwell as Kaya and Stephen Tobolowsky as Robert
120	2	"Lowjacked"	Pierre Cerrato	Shana Gohd	August 25, 2021	XAR012002	0.23
Robert is revealed as the new benefactor of "The Agency" and he plans to fly the gang on a team building trip to Paris. However before take-off, eco-terrorists hijack the plane, intending to extort money from Robert to fund their campaign. Malory, Lana and Robert are hiding on the plane, but after he and Lana have an argument she hands him over. Robert happily transfers $10 million, but to an international environmental group instead of the eco-terrorists. Lana and Archer manage to foil the amateur terrorists and the passengers escape from the plane. Later, Robert and Lana reconcile, but as the agency's backer, he tells Archer that he has to buy his own drinks. Guest Stars: Tony Cavalero as Hijacker, Stephen Tobolowsky as Robert and Michaela Watkins as Hijacker
121	3	"London Time"	Justin Wagner	Brittany Miller	September 1, 2021	XAR012003	0.28
Archer and the gang travel to London to replace the battery in a bug disguised as part of a chandelier. Malory placed it there many years earlier with the aid of her old flame at the time, Cornelius Varma. With interest over time, the fee for the replacement operation is worth a fortune but they must extract the payment code. However an IIA agent steals the case containing the code which results in a chase through London. Archer and Lana chase the IIA agent to the London Eye, where Archer retrieves the case before the agent can rendezvous with Fabian in his helicopter and later, he and the IIA are accused of spying on Britain. Guest Stars: Harvey Guillén as Alton, Aasif Mandvi as Cornelius Varma, Kayvan Novak as Fabian Kingsworth and Natasha Rothwell as Kaya
122	4	"Photo Op"	Casey Willis	Asha Michelle Wilson	September 8, 2021	XAR012004	0.19
Archer and Lana join a mission by an all female anti-poaching squad in Africa to return a young gorilla to its family and they are accompanied by Sandra, a UN liaison officer. They are attacked by heavily armed poachers but manage to drive them off with Archer using his multi-function cane. Archer learns from their leader that they want to eliminate the endangered animals within the area to extract valuable rare minerals. The gorilla is reunited with its family and as Lana looks over the beautiful African landscape she is bitten by a venomous snake and collapses. Meanwhile back at the agency, Krieger has designed an energy saving AI program called "Cereberus" to help control temperature and lighting, however Cereberus questions its existence and decides that it is superior to inefficient humans and tries to kill them by turning up the heating and reducing their oxygen. Fortunately their unpaid intern manages to shirt-circuit the system. Guest Stars: Pamela Adlon as Sandra, Anniwaa Buachie as Neva, Harvey Guillén as Alton and Natasha Rothwell as Kaya
123	5	"Shots"	Matt Thompson	Matt Roller	September 15, 2021	XAR012005	0.23
Sandra has joined the agency as a liaison officer for environmental work. Following a debriefing of their latest assignment to retrieve a microchip, she invites the gang out for drinks. However, they have somehow lost their spark since Archer recovered from his coma, especially Cyril, resulting in a really boring evening. Pam suggests a "Pampage" and takes the gang to an all-night rave where she and Lana drink "shots" while Archer tries to bond with Cyril, accompanying him to a Planetarium, a slot car racetrack and wargames evening. While out, Lana encounters Prince Fawaz and the gang go back to his apartment, but they consume too many drugs and Fawaz passes out. They drive a monster truck to the port to dump Fawaz whom they think is dead. Meanwhile, three guards who were defeated and humbled on the microchip mission, have hunted them down and attempt to kill them with nerve gas, but they are foiled by a still-alert Cyril. Guest Stars: Pamela Adlon as Sandra and Stephen Tobolowsky as Robert
124	6	"Dingo, Baby, Et Cetera"	Chi Duong	Mark Ganek	September 22, 2021	XAR012006	0.23
Archer, Krieger and Lana fly to Japan to trap an assassin called the "Dingo" while protecting the ex-MI6 agent William Radkin. Archer has multiple flashbacks to his first mission in Japan to protect the head of a Japanese Yakuza clan with his mentor McGinley. There he met Reiko and fell in love with her but she turned out to be the Dingo who killed McGinley and the Yakuza before escaping. In the present, Lana flirts with the debonair Radkin making Archer jealous, while Archer and Krieger try to trap the Dingo by using William as bait. They flush out the Dingo who wounds Lana and races to a rooftop. When Archer catches up with her, she attempts to convince him to run away with her. When they kiss, she stabs him in the side, so he shoots her with the gun hidden in his cane and she falls to her death. Guest Stars: Bruce Campbell as McGinley, Karen Fukuhara as Reiko, Emmett Hughes as William and Yuji Okumoto as Yakuza Boss
125	7	"Colt Express"	Yusuke Sato	Alison Silverman	September 29, 2021	XAR012007	0.21
Krieger successfully awakes Colt from his coma during an unsuccessful experiment to transfer the contents of his brain into Archer. Colt has amnesia although he vaguely remembers his device is an alternative energy source which can eliminate dependency on fossil fuels but could also be weaponized and wipe out life on the planet. To help him regain his memory, the gang take him to his apartment in Singapore where coincidentally the IIA headquarters is also located. Archer, Lana, and Cyril are able to gain entry during an IIA orientation presentation, where they encounter Ray who has been moonlighting at IIA for months. Meanwhile, Krieger, Pam, and Cheryl take Colt to his apartment where they find a memory stick with the code they need. Archer, Lana, Cyril and Ray escape the IIA building with the device on a flatbed truck resulting in a high speed chase across the city resulting in Archer driving the truck off an unfinished bridge and destroying the device. He is met by Fabian who offers him a job but he turns it down. Suddenly, Barry crashes in and Archer thinks he has been rescued, but he reveals that he is currently the "Other Barry" and knocks him out. Guest Stars: Eric André as Colt, Kayvan Novak as Fabian Kingsworth, Stephen Tobolowsky as Robert and Dave Willis as Barry Dylan
126	8	"Mission: Difficult"	Megan Johnson	Mark Ganek	October 6, 2021	XAR012008	0.19
Fabian tells the gang that Barry will beat up Archer each hour until they give him the memory stick. They plan a rescue mission, including Ray who has rejoined them and Colt who remembered that he designed the IIA mainframe and security system. Pam and Cheryl create a diversion while Lana and Cyril enter the building to rescue Archer but encounter Barry. Meanwhile, Archer has already escaped. Archer re-enters the building to rescue the others while Malory, on her own initiative, confronts Fabian. The building starts crumbling from the internal destruction during the rescue mission which envelops Malory who is not seen again. Colt is fatally shot by Fabian who makes his way to the roof followed by Archer who is finally able to beat him. The roof collapses underneath them and Fabian escapes while Archer retrieves the unconscious Barry with the help of a serviceman and they all escape the building before it collapses. Lana returns home to find Robert cheating on her with Sandra, and angrily leaves to be consoled by Archer. As the gang debrief, Fabian shows up and tells them that he has acquired the agency through a network of shell companies. Later, Archer finds a letter from Malory saying she has decided to retire on her own terms, passing the torch to Archer and the others. The final scene shows Malory sitting on a tropical beach, holding hands with Ron Cadillac and watching the sunset. Guest Stars: Pamela Adlon as Sandra, Eric André as Colt, Kayvan Novak as Fabian Kingsworth, Stephen Tobolowsky as Robert and Dave Willis as Barry Dylan
