= Jean-Luc Bilodeau =

Canadian actor (born 1990)

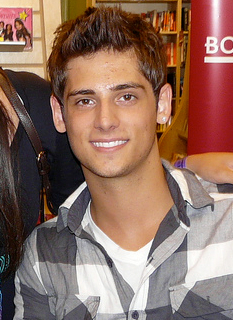
- Bilodeau at 16 Wishes event at Borders in 2010
- Born: November 4, 1990 (age 35); Vancouver, British Columbia, Canada
- Occupation: Actor
- Years active: 2004–present
- Spouse: Elise LeBlanc (m. 2025)

Jean-Luc Bilodeau (born November 4, 1990) is a Canadian actor. He is best known for his role as Ben Wheeler in the ABC Family channel program Baby Daddy. Bilodeau has also appeared in films and television series such as Ill Fated, Trick 'r Treat, 16 Wishes, Kyle XY, No Ordinary Family and Best Player. He was also in Emmalyn Estrada's music video "Don't Make Me Let You Go", and plays Jeremy in the film LOL.

== Early life ==
Bilodeau is the son of Raymond and Barbara Bilodeau, and has a sister, Danielle Bilodeau, who is a talent agent in Vancouver, British Columbia. Before becoming an actor, he was a dancer for almost a decade but dropped dancing because of his busy film schedule. He is of French Canadian descent.

== Career ==
Bilodeau began his acting career in his early teen years, when he has appeared in the television series Supernatural, The Troop, No Ordinary Family, R. L. Stine's The Haunting Hour: The Series and Girlfriends' Guide to Divorce. Bilodeau made his film debut in the dramedy film Ill Fated, playing the younger version of costar John Callander's character Bobby. He made his television debut in the sci-fi teen drama series Kyle XY as Josh Trager for all three seasons on ABC Family.

Bilodeau appeared as the protagonist's best friend Jay in the Disney Channel Original movie 16 Wishes, starring Debby Ryan, and as Ash alongside Jennette McCurdy and Jerry Trainor in the Nickelodeon Original movie Best Player. He also played a small supporting role in the coming-of-age film LOL which starred Miley Cyrus. He appeared in the 3D horror comedy film Piranha 3DD, where he played the role of Josh.

Bilodeau played the lead role of Ben on the successful ABC Family series Baby Daddy co-starring Tahj Mowry, which aired its series finale in May 2017, he won the Choice TV Actor: Comedy at the 2017 Teen Choice Awards. He appeared in the voice role of Barry in the drama film Axis starring Irish actor Emmett Hughes, which premiered at the 19th annual Sarasota Film Festival on April 7, 2017, and was released via video-on-demand on April 10, 2018. From 2019 to 2020, Bilodeau starred as Daniel on the short-lived CBS sitcom Carol's Second Act.

In 2023, Bilodeau was cast as Ronnie in the romantic comedy series The Holiday Shift, which was broadcast on The Roku Channel.

== Personal life ==
In June 2024, Bilodeau announced his engagement to photographer Elise LeBlanc. They were married on October 12, 2025, in Indio, California.

== Filmography ==
Film roles
Year	Title	Role	Notes
2004	Ill Fated	Young Bobby	
2007	Trick 'r Treat	Schrader	
2009	Spectacular!	Star Spangled Boy	Television film
2010	16 Wishes	Jay Kepler	Television film
2010	Strange Brew	Michael	Television film
2010	Debby Ryan: A Wish Comes True Everyday!		Short film
2011	Best Player	Ash	Television film
2012	LOL	Jeremy	
2012	Piranha 3DD	Josh	
2013	Love Me	Harry Townsend	
2014	Expecting Amish	Samuel	Television film
2015	All in Time	Clark	
2016	Casa Vita	Early Lindstrom	Television film
2017	Axis	Barry	Voice role

Television roles
Year	Title	Role	Notes
2006–2009	Kyle XY	Josh Trager	Main role
2008	Supernatural	Justin	Episode: "It's the Great Pumpkin, Sam Winchester"
2009	The Troop	Lance Donovan	Episode: "Tentacle Face"
2010	No Ordinary Family	Bret Martin	Episodes: "No Ordinary Mobster" and "No Ordinary Accident"
2011	R.L. Stine's The Haunting Hour	Eric	Episode: "Scary Mary"
2012–2017	Baby Daddy	Ben Wheeler	Lead role
2015	Girlfriends' Guide to Divorce	Adam	Episode: "Rule No. 8: Timing Is Everything"
2019–2020	Carol's Second Act	Dr. Daniel Kutcher	Main role
2023	The Holiday Shift	Ronnie	Main role
2024	Tracker	Jason	Episode: “Trust Fall”

== Awards ==
In 2017, Jean-Luc Bilodeau won the Teen Choice Awards in the category Choice TV Actor Comedy for his role in Baby Daddy.
