= Girl on Guy =

Comedy podcast

- Genre: Comedy
- Language: English

Creative team
- Created by: Aisha Tyler

Cast and voices
- Hosted by: Aisha Tyler

Music
- Theme music composed by: DJ iLL Media

Production
- Length: 60–120 Minutes

Publication
- No. of episodes: 222
- Original release: August 2, 2011 – December 28, 2016

Reception
- Cited as: 2011 iTunes Best New Comedy Podcast

Related
- Website: girlonguy.net

Girl on Guy is an audio podcast launched in 2011 by Aisha Tyler, in which she interviews various celebrities about their lives and careers. Self-described as "guy-centric", the podcast is a show about "stuff guys love", namely "culture, booze, comedy, family, physical injuries, psychological bruises, action movies, rock music, ninjas, zombies, failure, success, sacrifice, video games, and blowing shit up." In 2012 the podcast passed the milestone of four million downloads. Tyler's book Self-inflicted wounds is drawn from a segment on the podcast wherein guests discuss mistakes they made earlier in life. Although Girl on Guy is one of the several jobs Tyler juggles, she posits that the benefit of podcast hosting is that fans "become evangelists for you."

Tyler both records and produces the podcast herself using Shure microphones and Final Cut Pro. The podcast was nominated in 2012 as one of Stitcher's best new podcasts and was recognized as iTunes best new comedy podcast of 2013. The podcast was also 2013 recipient of a Webby Award in the field of radio and podcasts.

== Episodes ==
=== Series overview ===
Season	Episodes	Originally released	
Season	Episodes	First released	Last released
1	59	July 25, 2011	August 7, 2012
2	45	September 17, 2012	July 30, 2013
3	46	September 16, 2013	July 29, 2014
4	45	September 23, 2014	July 29, 2015
5	15	September 23, 2015	December 29, 2015

=== Season 1 (2011–12) ===
No.	Guest(s) and/or Title	Tagline	Original release date
1	Jon Benjamin	Honeyed tones, granite stones	July 25, 2011
2	Brett Elrich	Infomania, Rotten Tomatoes, Viral Video Film School	August 2, 2011
3	Adam Reed	Archer, Frisky Dingo, Sealab 2021	August 9, 2011
4	Adam Carolla	The Adam Carolla Show	August 16, 2011
5	Zachary Levi	Chuck, The Nerd Machine	August 19, 2011
6	Bill Burr	Chappelle's Show, Opie And Anthony, 'Why Do I Do This'. 'Let It Go	August 23, 2011
7	Paul F. Tompkins	The Pod F.tompkast, The Best Week Ever, Mr Show With Bob And David	August 30, 2011
8	Jackie Kashian	The Dork Forest, Comey Central, Bob And Tom Show	September 2, 2011
9	Chris Hardwick	The Nerdist, Web Soup, Attack Of The Show	September 6, 2011
10	Chris Parnell	Saturday Night Live, 30 Rock, Archer	September 13, 2011
11	Cliff Bleszinski	Design Director, Epic Games	September 20, 2011
12	Maggie Q	Nikita, Priest, Die Hard 4, Mission Impossible 3	September 23, 2011
13	Judy Greer and Amber Nash	Archer	September 26, 2011
15	Randy and Jason Sklar	Sklarbro Country, Cheap Seats, The Jim Rome Show	October 7, 2011
16	Ben Gleib	Chelsea Lately, The Late Late Show, Last Call With Carson Daly	October 10, 2011
17	Adam Savage	Mythbusters	October 17, 2011
18	Sal Masekela	Espn X-games, The Daily 10	October 24, 2011
19	The Luna Brothers	Girls, Ultra, The Sword, Spider-woman	October 31, 2011
20	Neil Fallon of Clutch	TBA	November 6, 2011
21	Army Corporal Jeremy Kuehl	TBA	November 10, 2011
22	Robert Kirkman	Creator, The Walking Dead	November 13, 2011
23	Travis Rice	World Champion Snowboarder	November 22, 2011
24	Tom Morello	The Nightwatchman, Rage Against The Machine, Audioslave, Street Sweeper Social Club	November 30, 2011
25	Jean Grae	Indie Mc Extraordinaire	December 6, 2011
26	Silversun Pickups	La Indie Rock Phenoms	December 11, 2011
27	World Poker Champion Joe Hachem	TBA	December 21, 2011
28	George Stroumboulopoulos	Strombo Tonight On The Cbc	January 3, 2012
29	Touré	Author, Music Critic, Novelist, Enfant Térrible	January 10, 2012
30	Margaret Cho	Comedian, Actress, Singer, Hell-raiser	January 16, 2012
31	Andy Richter	Late Night Monster Talent	January 23, 2012
32	Greg Proops	Standup, Improv Comic, Smartest Man In The World	February 1, 2012
33	Comedian Dwayne Perkins	TBA	February 7, 2012
34	Tom Lennon and Ben Garant	The State, Viva Variety, Reno 911	February 15, 2012
35	Peter Facinelli	Actor, Writer, Producer, Vampire Patriarch	February 21, 2012
36	Gary Anthony Williams	The Boondocks, Malcolm In The Middle, Boston Legal, Harold And Kumar	February 28, 2012
37	Rich Eisen	Espn, Nfl Network, Your Mom’s House	March 8, 2012
38	Jimmy Pardo	Never Not Funny Podcast, Conan, Name Hubris	March 12, 2012
39	Dana Gould	Comic Supernova	March 21, 2012
40	Evan Glodell	Mad Scientist, Wild-eyed Dreamer, Director (bellflower)	March 27, 2012
41	Chef David Myers	Comme ça, David Myers Café, Chef Ablaze	April 3, 2012
42	Baratunde Thurston	Digital Director, The Onion; Author, How To Be Black; Vigilante Pundit	April 10, 2012
43	Comedian Retta	Comedy Central, Parks And Recreation	April 17, 2012
44	Jay Mohr	Mohr Stories, A Crapload Of Movies And Tv	April 23, 2012
45	Wayne Brady	Whose Line Is It Anyway, The Wayne Brady Show, How I Met Your Mother, Let’s Make A Deal	May 1, 2012
46	Scott Thompson	The Kids In The Hall, Larry Sanders	May 9, 2012
47	Time Columnist Joel Stein	TBA	May 15, 2012
48	Anthony Bourdain	No Reservations, The Layover, Your Mom’s Kitchen	May 22, 2012
49	Comedian Jo Koy	Chelsea Lately, Tonight Show, Comedy Central	May 30, 2012
50	Talib Kweli	Virtuoso Emcee	June 5, 2012
51	Jonathan Silverman	Everything. Seriously.	June 10, 2012
52	Cedric Yarbrough	Reno 911, The Boondocks, Black Dynamite	June 19, 2012
53	Ken Marino	Burning Love, Children’s Hospital, The State	June 27, 2012
54	Lisa Kudrow	Comedy Phd	July 3, 2012
55	Chuck Klosterman	Live From St. George	July 11, 2012
56	Dana White	President, Ultimate Fighting Championship	July 18, 2012
57	Rupaul Charles	Rupaul’s Drag Race, Drag U, Supermodel Of The World	July 25, 2012
58	Jay Chandrasekhar	Broken Lizard, Super Troopers, The Babymakers	July 31, 2012
59	Chris Henchy	Funny Or Die, Gary Sanchez, The Campaign	August 7, 2012

=== Season 2 (2012–13) ===
No.	Guest and/or Title	Tagline	Original release date
60	Nathan Fillion	Actor, Gamer, Gentleman Rogue	September 17, 2012
61	Shirley Manson	Rock And Roll Whirlwind	September 27, 2012
62	Jared Padalecki	Nice Guy Demon Hunter	October 1, 2012
63	Kevin Heffernan	Comedy Powerhouse, Human Jelly Donut	October 9, 2012
64	Jim Rash	Southern Gentleman, Rabble Rouser	October 15, 2012
65	Matt Iseman	Medical Doctor, Dorito Lover, Go-to Guy	October 24, 2012
66	Tom Papa	Wild-eyed Dreamer, Comedy Machine	October 30, 2012
67	Saul Williams	Poet. Artist. Emcee. Amethyst Rock Star.	November 6, 2012
68	Kevin Allison	Story Teller, Risk Taker	November 13, 2012
69	Dave Attell	Comedy Sharpshooter. Porn Connoisseur. Teatime Delight.	November 19, 2012
70	Ryan Sickler	Live From The La Podcast Fest	November 26, 2012
71	Felicia Day	Writer. Producer. Actor. Gamer. Very Full Bunny.	December 4, 2012
72	Seth Green	Futuristic Hustler	December 10, 2012
73	Rove Mcmanus	Aussie Late Night Phenom	December 20, 2012
75	The First Annual Awesome Listener Question Show	Querypocalypse	December 31, 2012
76	Kunal Nayyar	Big Bang Theorist	January 8, 2013
77	Top Chef Antonia Lofaso	Black Market Liquor Bar; Culinary All-star	January 17, 2013
78	Comedian Eddie Ifft	Shit Talker	January 21, 2013
79	Chris D’elia	Ninja Leading Man Bear Cub	January 28, 2013
80	Eugene Mirman	Underground Comic Scientist	February 4, 2013
81	W. Kamau Bell	Bespectacled Provocateur, Powerpoint Maven, Late Night Subversive	February 12, 2013
82	Sam Ross	Shitkicking Cocktail Cowboy	February 19, 2013
83	Comedian Cash Levy	Cashing In With Tj Miller	February 27, 2013
84	Kevin Smith	Supreme Commander Of The Smodstar	March 5, 2013
85	Maria Bamford	Whirling Comedy Dervish	March 12, 2013
86	Jesse Williams	Good Guy Done Way Better	March 20, 2013
87	Minnesota Viking Chris Kluwe	Beautifully Unique Sparklepony	March 27, 2013
88	Steven Yeun	Post-apocalyptic Badass	April 1, 2013
89	Richard Roeper	Movie Man	April 10, 2013
90	Comedian Ron Funches	Adorably Hilarious Chocolate Chip Comedy Cookie	April 17, 2013
91	Oscar Nuñez	Hilarious Sexy Latin Bastard	April 23, 2013
92	Carlton Cuse	International Mind Of Mystery	April 30, 2013
93	Rob Delaney	Twitter Joke Ninja	May 8, 2013
94	Matt Walsh	Upright Citizen Brigadier And Gentleman Gingernut	May 13, 2013
95	Marcus Samuelsson	Culinary Powerhouse	May 21, 2013
96	Ty Pennington	Dream Builder; One Man Wrecking Crew	June 5, 2013
96	Henry Rollins (Aisha Has A Cold)	Dream Builder; One Man Wrecking Crew	May 28, 2013
97	Joe Manganiello	Alpha Dog	June 11, 2013
98	Comedian Michael Kosta	Comedy Pro	June 18, 2013
99	Chef Edward Lee	Bourbon-loving Southern Gentleman	June 26, 2013
100	Jeri Ryan	Brilliant Intergalactic Fox	July 3, 2013
101	Chris Rock	Monster Of Rock	July 10, 2013
102	Kumail Nanjiani	Indoor Kid	July 18, 2013
103	Chali 2na of Jurassic 5	Fish Out Of Water	July 25, 2013
104	Levar Burton	Intergalactic Groundbreaker	July 30, 2013

=== Season 3 (2013–14) ===
No.	Guest and/or Title	Tagline	Original release date
105	Jack Osbourne	Rock Royalty, Adrenaline Junkie Gone Zombie Huntin	September 16, 2013
106	Josh Radnor	Actor, Director, Kindness Jedi	September 24, 2013
107	Greg Miller	Game Over, Greggy	October 1, 2013
108	Jared Padalecki 2	The Padaleckalypse	October 8, 2013
109	Greg Grunberg	Big Ass TV Star, Super Nice Hero Guy	October 15, 2013
110	Nick Kroll	TBA	October 22, 2013
111	Gabrielle Reece	Badass Fox In The Middle	October 29, 2013
112	David Wain	Cocksure Somnolent Prolific Funny Man	November 5, 2013
113	Dan Bucatinsky	Television Gladiator	November 12, 2013
114	Matt Mira	Four Eyes And A Bearded Trekkie	November 19, 2013
115	Cheyenne Jackson	Small Town Boy Made New	November 26, 2013
116	Owen Benjamin	6'7" Passionate Male Seeks Woman With Tomatoes	December 3, 2013
117	Dan Savage	American Savage	December 10, 2013
118	Kii Arens	Rock N' Roll Kid	December 17, 2013
119	Adam Shankman	Dance Machine	December 24, 2013
120	The Second Annual Awesome Listener Question Show	Querypocalypse Ii	December 31, 2013
121	Rob Corddry	Mind Like Water	January 7, 2014
122	Harold Perrineau	Real Life Operator	January 15, 2014
123	Jason Somerville	Poker Phenom Uncaged	January 22, 2014
124	Constance Zimmer	Reluctant Cable Darling	January 28, 2014
125	Misha Collins	Fallen Angel	February 4, 2014
126	Andrew Rannells	Hello!!!	February 11, 2014
127	Mehcad Brooks	More Than Just Eggs	February 19, 2014
128	Scott Foley	Out Of The Hole And Back On Top	February 25, 2014
129	Paul Gilmartin	Free From The Jaws Of The Beast	March 4, 2014
130	Comedian Dave Anthony	Still Walking The Room	March 11, 2014
131	The Late Late Show’s Bob Oschack	Misunderstood Dabbler	March 18, 2014
132	John Cho	Intergalactic Planetary	March 25, 2014
133	Jake Johannsen	Jake This	April 1, 2014
134	Ryan Stiles	Charming Curmudgeon	April 8, 2014
135	Rick Fox	Saintly Beast	April 15, 2014
136	Charles Michael Davis	Completely Original	April 22, 2014
137	Malik Yoba	Undercover Brother	April 29, 2014
138	Tig Notaro	Inimitable. Indefatigable.	May 6, 2014
139	Paris Barclay	Groundbreaker. Barrier Breaker. Rulebreaker.	May 13, 2014
140	Carol Leifer	Easy Hang	May 20, 2014
141	Blaine Capatch	Slender But Deadly	May 27, 2014
142	Sara Gilbert	Nature Breaker	June 3, 2014
143	Carlos Ferro	Digital Badass	June 11, 2014
144	Dan Hay	Executive Producer, Far Cry 4	June 17, 2014
145	TJ Miller	Golden Boat Captain	June 24, 2014
146	Bert Kreischer	Coming In Hot	July 1, 2014
147	Adam Rodriguez	Straight Outta Yonkers	July 8, 2014
148	Wil Wheaton	Lovable Nemesis	July 15, 2014
149	Jenna Ushkowitz	Gleeful	July 22, 2014
150	Russell Peters	Big In Japan	July 29, 2014

=== Season 4 (2014–15) ===
No.	Guest and/or Title	Tagline	Original release date
151	Jesse Tyler Ferguson	A Very Modern Man	September 23, 2014
152	Corey Stoll	Tragic Hero	September 30, 2014
153	Stephen Amell	Utterly Sincerious	October 7, 2014
154	Steve Rannazzisi	Unlikely Mvp	October 14, 2014
155	Kristen Schaal	Wildly Delightful	October 21, 2014
156	Marc Maron	Live From La Podfest	October 28, 2014
157	Shane West	Extraordinary Gentleman	November 4, 2014
158	Kristin Bauer Van Straten	True Blue	November 11, 2014
159	Billy Gardell	Standup Guy	November 18, 2014
160	Scott Gimple	Walking Amongst The Dead	November 25, 2014
161	Joshua Morrow	Young And Somewhat Restless	December 2, 2014
162	Steve Byrne	American Son	December 9, 2014
163	Kristen Johnston	Walking On The Sun	December 16, 2014
164	Joel Mchale	Soup To Nuts	December 23, 2014
165	The Third Annual Awesome Listener Question Show	Querypalooza Iii: The Querying	December 30, 2014
166	Todd Glass	Live From Maui Comedy Fest	January 6, 2015
167	Director James Byrkit	Director Of "coherence"	January 13, 2015
168	Derek Lee (Afflicted)	Actor/writer/director/madman "afflicted"	January 20, 2015
169	Jesse Thorn	Maximum Funster	January 28, 2015
170	Sarah Colonna	In Search Of Pants	February 3, 2015
171	Romany Malco	Madly Introspective	February 10, 2015
172	Dan St. Germain	Lone Wolf	February 17, 2015
173	Amber Tamblyn	Breakneck Poet	February 25, 2015
174	Dean Winters	Calculated Mayhem	March 3, 2015
175	John Ridley	American Polymath	March 10, 2015
176	Leland Orser	Wild At Art	March 17, 2015
177	Jessalyn Gilsig	Northern Light	March 24, 2015
178	Frank Bruni	New York Times' Man On Top	April 2, 2015
179	David Benioff	Watch The Throne	April 6, 2015
180	Chris Daughtry	Rock N' Roll Idol	April 14, 2015
181	Jesse L. Martin	A Beautiful Mind	April 21, 2015
182	Thomas Q. Jones	Consensus All-American	April 29, 2015
183	Jaime Camil	Southern Son	May 7, 2015
184	Tony Goldwyn	Prodigal Son	May 13, 2015
185	Emily Bett Rickards	Smoakin' Hot	May 19, 2015
186	Jerry Ferrara	Out Of His Shell	May 26, 2015
187	Sam Rockwell	Got To Give It Up	June 2, 2015
188	Alison Rosen	Your New Best Friend	June 9, 2015
189	Robert Lasardo	Live Through This	June 18, 2015
190	Michael Voltaggio	Inked	June 23, 2015
191	Adam Rodriguez 2	Back To The Grind	June 30, 2015
192	Milo Ventimiglia	Heroic	July 7, 2015
193	Kevin Durand	Live From Comic Con2015	July 16, 2015
194	Steve Mazan	Dying to do Letterman	July 22, 2015
195	LL Cool J	Authentic	July 29, 2015

=== Season 5 (2015) ===
No.	Guest and/or Title	Tagline	Original release date
196	Horatio Sanz	Live from LA Podfest	September 23, 2015
197	Andre Royo	From The Wire to Empire	September 29, 2015
198	Grant Gustin	Don't Blink	October 5, 2015
199	Daniel Gillies	Beyond Original	October 12, 2015
200	Kelly Carlin	Chip off the Legendary Block	October 20, 2015
201	Jay Larson	Beyond the Bar	October 28, 2015
202	Novelist Brad Meltzer	No Regrets	November 3, 2015
203	Travis Van Winkle	Crystal Clear	November 11, 2015
204	Joe Mantegna	A Beautiful Mind	November 18, 2015
205	Robert Patrick	Unstoppable	November 24, 2015
206	Bokeem Woodbine	Kissing the Sky	December 8, 2015
207	Comedian Wayne Federman	Catiously Optimistic	December 13, 2015
208	Sarah Burns	Fast Learner	December 16, 2015
209	Omar Benson Miller	Ballin'	December 22, 2015
210	Awesome Listener Question Show 2015	Querynado'	December 29, 2015
