= Archer season 11 =

Season of television series

Archer
- Season 11
- No. of episodes: 8

Release
- Original network: FXX
- Original release: September 16 – October 28, 2020

Season chronology
- ← Previous; Archer 1999 Next → Season 12

The eleventh season of the animated television series Archer, created by Adam Reed, aired on FXX from September 16 to October 28, 2020.

== Production ==
The eleventh season was scheduled to premiere on May 6, 2020, but was postponed until September 16 amidst the COVID-19 pandemic.

The episode "Bloodsploosh" is dedicated to the memory of Ron Leibman (voice of Ron Cadillac), who died on December 6, 2019 from pneumonia before this episode aired.

== Synopsis ==
The season begins with Archer waking up from his coma, returning to the real world of his career as a spy. As dysfunctional as ever, Archer finds it hard to adjust to a world that doesn't need him, while the rest of the ISIS team, now called "The Agency", find their lives and dynamics thrown into chaos by Archer's return. Cyril is a competent and muscular field agent, Cheryl/Carol is remarkably stable and an efficient secretary, Ray excels as the group's jack-of-all-trades, Krieger's mad science finally has a stable outlet, and Malory is finally the eager spymaster she always wanted to be. Lana, as competent as ever, has married a wealthy philanthropist named Robert and has sent her daughter, AJ, to boarding school in Switzerland.

The setting is once again New York, following the seventh season (the last season before Archer's coma) which took place in Los Angeles.

== Episodes ==
No. overall	No. in season	Title	Directed by	Written by	Original release date	Prod. code	US viewers (millions)
111	1	"The Orpheus Gambit"	Chad Hurd	Mark Ganek	September 16, 2020	XAR011001	0.38
While on a covert mission, the team receives a call from Malory who says that Archer has awoken from his three-year coma. Upon returning to their headquarters, Archer is surprised to find that everyone has changed and that he is no longer the linchpin of their operations. Because he is weak from inactivity, Krieger presents him with a multifunctional tactical cane. Archer joins them on their next mission - guarding the statue known as Weeping Orpheus from the art thief known as "Peregrine". At the gallery, and to his dismay, Archer discovers that Lana has married the balding Robert. When the statue is stolen from under their noses, the Interpol agent Bruchstein berates them for their incompetence. However, Archer has deduced that she is actually Peregrine which leads to a pursuit and shootout. Archer foils her getaway with his cane and later receives a grudging compliment from Malory. Guest Stars: Jamie Lee Curtis as Peregrine and Stephen Tobolowsky as Robert
112	2	"Bloodsploosh"	Pierre Cerrato	Mike Arnold	September 16, 2020	XAR011002	0.31
Archer and the gang attend a martial arts tournament to capture an international arms dealer, Win Li. As part of the plan, Cyril competes in the tournament. The plan takes longer than expected and Cyril gets severely beaten, prompting Pam to step in and floor his opponent. She is then matched with Dragon Fire who turns out to be Conway Stern and as they fight, they manage to weave the names of Glenn Close films into their jibes. They are interrupted when Lana and Archer fall through the skylight resulting in the venue being trashed and Conway Stern having his left foot amputated by a piece of glass. In the ensuing chaos, Malory tasers Win Li with Archer's tactical cane. Guest Stars: Coby Bell as Conway Stern and Bowen Yang as Win Li
113	3	"Helping Hands"	Casey Willis	Shana Gohd	September 23, 2020	XAR011003	0.24
Cyril and Lana break into the secret vault of a reclusive and crippled inventor, Hands, only to find Archer already there in a bid to prove his ability. He accidentally locks them in the vault which contains a selection of collector's items. He starts touching them which sets off a series of alarms and booby traps. He accidentally frees himself and meets Hands who invented an exoskeleton so she can move without pain. Pam and Krieger arrive to rescue Cyril and Lana but become pinned down by gunmen from Juno, a rival organization planning to steal the invention. Meanwhile, Hands has offered Archer an opportunity to try the device and he uses it to overcome the Juno gunmen and save the team. However, when he tries to walk out with it, Hands takes control of it with a remote control and painfully contorts his body. Guest Star: D'Arcy Carden as Hands
114	4	"Robot Factory"	Matt Thompson	Matt Roller	September 30, 2020	XAR011004	0.29
Archer is horrified that Barry has now joined the team and that he will accompany him, Lana, and Cyril on a mission. They plan to shut down a Russian robot factory that is using Barry’s schematics to create exact versions of him, including his red jumpsuit. Meanwhile, Malory is trying to find a valet whom Archer can live with. After parachuting near the robot factory, the team infiltrates the facility. While Lana uploads a virus to shut down the robots, Archer, Barry, and Cyril fight an army of robotic Barrys. When they are confronted by a heavily armed robot, Barry self-destructs to save the others. By now Archer believes Barry is not a traitor and mourns his loss, only to discover that Barry transferred his consciousness into one of the robot clones before the explosion. Back at headquarters, Malory believes she has found the perfect valet, Aleister. Guest Star: Simon Pegg as Aleister
115	5	"Best Friends"	Chi Duong Sato	Matt Roller	October 7, 2020	XAR011005	0.31
Archer is supremely impressed by his new valet Aleister. Meanwhile, Ray is supposed to be on a mission in Africa and calls in for help, but it is a ruse to invite Krieger and Lana to join him on a holiday in Fiji - Pam and Cheryl secretly tag along. After many deadly mishaps in the company of Cyril, Archer deduces that someone is trying to kill him and he suspects Aleister. He confronts Aleister who knocks him out and ties him up. When Archer awakens, Aleister explains that he was tasked to kill the world's greatest spy, Cyril, who was highly effective while Archer was in a coma. Archer tries to prove he is a better spy than Cyril, and in a duel, he kills Aleister, the valet he grew to admire and depend on in a very short time. Guest Star: Simon Pegg as Aleister
116	6	"The Double Date"	Marcus Rosentrater	Shane Kosakowski	October 14, 2020	XAR011006	0.36
Archer goes on a double date with Lana and Robert accompanied by his new girlfriend and scientist, Gabrielle. The small talk goes badly with Archer managing to offend almost everyone including the waiter. When Gabrielle and Lana visit the ladies' restroom, Gabrielle discovers that Lana is AJ's mother. Malory and Cyril arrive and remind Archer that he is supposed to be surveilling the Russian hacker, Victor Chernenko. While Cyril opportunistically takes out Chernenko's bodyguard, the rest of the group follows the Russian and his girlfriend on foot. Along the way, Archer gradually disgraces himself with Gabrielle who gets on quite well with Lana. Archer, Gabrielle, and Lana follow Chernenko into a subway station where they see his girlfriend push him in front of a train. Gabrielle leaves Archer and walks off, meanwhile, Lana arrives home and finds Malory and Robert happily enjoying TV together like best buddies. Guest Stars: Nicole Byer as Gabrielle and Stephen Tobolowsky as Robert
117	7	"Caught Napping"	Justin Wagner	Mark Ganek	October 21, 2020	XAR011007	0.33
After a drunken night, Archer wakes up in Robert's private plane with the gang and Robert informs him that Abbiejean (AJ) has been kidnapped for a ransom of $100 million. They trace the kidnappers to Switzerland and discover Peregrine is behind the kidnapping. A shootout and a chase follow where the gang rescue AJ and then Lana takes out her revenge by shooting Peregrine with all the ammunition she has. Later, Lana introduces AJ to Archer for the first time and she tells him that her mother referred to him as a "sperm delivery device". Guest Stars: Flula Borg as Gerswan Ramschluss, Jamie Lee Curtis as Peregrine, and Stephen Tobolowsky as Robert
118	8	"Cold Fusion"	Casey Willis	Mark Ganek	October 28, 2020	XAR011008	0.31
Wealthy investor, Trip, takes the crew to an Antarctic research base he has been funding to investigate a murder and possible sabotage of a transmission antenna. During their investigation, Maddox, Trip's second in command, is murdered. The station scientists have discovered a flaw in the ice sheets which could cause sea levels to rise dramatically if they break. Archer extracts a confession from Rex, the chief of the station, that someone had dropped a hydrogen bomb by parachute. When Maddox went to investigate, they found Bob was sabotaging the antenna and Rex killed him. Archer postulates that Trip had the bomb delivered so that he could use it to destroy the ice sheet, causing sea levels to rise and thus make a fortune selling his floating mini-cities. The gang manages to stop Trip, and Archer almost suffers from hypothermia when he dives into the icy water to booby-trap Trip's submarine and prevent his escape. After he's rescued, Lana berates Archer for his recklessness, but Archer, having had enough of everyone blaming him for their behavior, calls them out for using him as an excuse to be their worst selves. Guest Stars: Kayvan Novak as Rex, Tiffany Morgan as Maddox and Pamela Adlon as Sandra

== Reception ==
On the review aggregator website Rotten Tomatoes, 80% of 5 critics' reviews are positive, with an average rating of 9.00/10.
