= 16 Wishes =

TV film

- DVD cover
- Genre: Comedy; Fantasy; Teen
- Written by: Annie DeYoung
- Directed by: Peter DeLuise
- Starring: Debby Ryan; Jean-Luc Bilodeau; Karissa Tynes; Anna Mae Routledge
- Composer: James Jandrisch
- Countries of origin: United States; Canada
- Original language: English

Production
- Executive producers: Ron French; Michael Jacobs; Fernando Szew
- Producers: Robyn Snyder; Ron French
- Cinematography: Michael R. Lohmann
- Editor: Richard Schwadel
- Running time: 90 minutes
- Production company: Unity Pictures

Original release
- Network: Disney Channel
- Release: June 25, 2010
- Network: Family
- Release: July 16, 2010

16 Wishes is a 2010 teen fantasy-comedy television film directed by Peter DeLuise and written by Annie DeYoung, starring Debby Ryan, Jean-Luc Bilodeau, Karissa Tynes and Anna Mae Routledge. It premiered on June 25, 2010, on Disney Channel in the United States and on July 16, 2010, on Family Channel in Canada. The film was the most watched cable program on the day of its premiere on Disney Channel. In addition, 16 Wishes introduced Ryan to new audiences, such as the contemporary adult audiences since the movie received high viewership in the adults demographic (18–34). The film was the second most watched program on cable during the week of its premiere.

It was the second film to be released on Disney Channel in 2010 that was not promoted as a "Disney Channel Original Movie" (after Harriet the Spy: Blog Wars) and is a co-production between Disney Channel, Family Channel, Unity Pictures of Vancouver and MarVista Entertainment in Los Angeles. In other countries, it was advertised as a Disney Channel Original Movie. It was planned to have its UK premiere on November 19, 2010, on Disney Channel UK, but was replaced with Starstruck, which had already been shown in May; it was later shown in December 2010 in the UK.

== Plot ==
Abby Jensen has been planning her sweet sixteen since she was a little girl and keeps a list of wishes that she wants to come true. When her sixteenth birthday finally arrives, she adds her crush, Logan, as her sixteenth and final wish to the list. Throughout the day, Abby is visited by a peculiar woman named Celeste. Celeste first appears as an exterminator when the Jensens' house is swarmed by wasps from a nest that had been building up for 16 years. Celeste saves Abby's list, but the family is unable to return inside until the wasps are exterminated.

Abby meets her best friend, Jay Kepler, at the bus stop, where he gives her a necklace as a birthday gift. Celeste returns, dressed as a mailwoman, and gives Abby 16 candles and a matchbox. Abby lights the first candle, and her first wish—meeting celebrity Joey Lockhart—is fulfilled. Realizing that the numbers on the candles correspond to the numbers of the wishes on her list, Abby lights the eighth candle, granting her wish for a car. When Celeste emerges from the car, Abby deduces that Celeste is a magical being, as she appears every time a wish is granted.

Abby unsuccessfully attempts her third wish. Celeste warns her that there is a limit to how many wishes can be granted within an hour and that at midnight, the wishes she made will become permanent. Throughout the school day, Abby uses the candles to beat her rival, Krista Cook (who has the same birthday), in a volleyball match and to become student body president.

Jay agrees to take Abby shopping for a dress for her party but drops his wallet. They are followed by Krista, who convinces the clerk to eject them. Abby uses the ninth candle to make a wish to be treated like an adult, creating consequences of adulthood that she did not previously consider: Abby is suddenly 22 years old and no longer in high school. None of her classmates remember her, and she cannot live with her parents due to the ongoing wasp infestation in their home. She has an apartment, but the landlord is ready to evict her for nonpayment of rent. Desperate for an explanation, Abby makes a wish to beckon Celeste. Celeste arrives and reveals that the candles grant her wishes literally, as shown when her wish to be treated like an adult physically turned her into one.

Abby unsuccessfully tries to alter and add to her wish list. When she makes a wish for her parents to understand her, it is granted, but her parents only understand her under the impression that she is an adult. Finding Jay at Krista’s sweet sixteen, she manages to restore his memories of their friendship by showing him the necklace he gave her, but he remains unable to help her. After talking to Krista, Abby learns that the two are on good terms in adulthood and that Jay wanted to be student body president.

Abby returns to her apartment, where she meets Celeste and laments her selfishness. Celeste reveals that because the photo of Logan was attached to the list using chewed gum, it technically does not count and can be changed. Abby swaps out the photo for one of herself taken that morning and wishes to return to that morning right before midnight strikes.

With her life back to normal, Abby throws away her wish list and gives her money to her brother, Mike, for a guitar. Abby realizes that Krista dislikes her because she felt Abby took Jay away from her as a friend. The two reconcile and work together to make Jay student body president, fulfilling his dream. At Abby and Krista’s joint birthday party, Krista and Logan become a couple, as do Jay and Abby. As all four dance in celebration, Celeste turns into a fairy and flies away.

== Cast ==
- Debby Ryan as Abigail "Abby" Jensen
  - Kailey Cross as young Abby
- Jean-Luc Bilodeau as Jay Kepler
  - Mitch Duffield as young Jay
- Anna Mae Routledge as Celeste
- Karissa Tynes as Krista Cook
  - Alyssa Wellington as young Krista
- Keenan Tracey as Logan Buchanan
- Joel Semande as Joey Lockhart
- Cainan Wiebe as Mike Jensen
- Patrick Gilmore as Bob Jensen
- Kendall Cross as Sue Jensen
- Jesse Reid as Theodore Hope
- Brenda Crichlow as Miss Duffy
- Patricia Isaac as Snooty Sales Woman
- Gary Jones as Principal Smith

== Production ==
Some scenes were filmed at Walnut Grove Secondary School in Langley, British Columbia.

== Soundtrack ==
16 Wishes

Soundtrack album by Various artists
- Released: June 15, 2010
- Recorded: 2010
- Genre: Soundtrack
- Length: 28:32
- Label: MarVista Entertainment
- Producer: Various artists

16 Wishes is the soundtrack album for the film of the same name, released on June 15, 2010, by MarVista Entertainment.

=== Track listing ===
No.	Title	Performer(s)	Length
1.	"A Wish Comes True Everyday"	Debby Ryan	3:10
2.	"No One's Fool"	Keith & Renee	3:15
3.	"Princess Girl"	Minutes	3:21
4.	"Bad Momma"	Chad Gendason	2:19
5.	"Saying Goodbye" (feat. Michaele Popp & Aaron Harvey)	Chase Ryan	2:44
6.	"Picture Perfect"	Jennifer Cathcart	3:14
7.	"The Way It Used To Be"	Not by Choice	4:05
8.	"Vertigo"	Willknots	3:38
9.	"Overreaction"	Chad Gendason	3:15
10.	"Open Eyes"	Debby Ryan & Chase Ryan	4:06
11.	"Don't Wanna Grow Up"	Willknots	3:53
Total length:			28:32

== Reception ==
The movie garnered over 5.6 million viewers in its first showing. The film went on to become the most watched cable program on the day of its premiere on Disney Channel. The Sunday airing of the film received over 4.0 million viewers.
