= Axis (film) =

- Film poster
- Directed by: Aisha Tyler
- Screenplay by: Emmett Hughes
- Story by: Emmett Hughes; Stephen Morrissey
- Produced by: R. Vaughn Gill; Vertel Scott; Barry Sonders; Aisha Tyler
- Starring: Emmett Hughes; Emily Bett Rickards; Amber Nash; Paula Malcomson; Jonathan Sadowski; Jean-Luc Bilodeau
- Cinematography: Lowell A. Meyer
- Edited by: John Quinn; Aisha Tyler
- Music by: Silversun Pickups
- Production company: Hot Machine
- Distributed by: Giant Interactive
- Release date: April 7, 2017
- Running time: 85 minutes
- Country: United States
- Language: English

Axis is a 2017 drama film written by and starring Emmett Hughes. The film marks the feature film directorial debut of Aisha Tyler, who raised funds for the project through a Kickstarter campaign. The film premiered at the 19th annual Sarasota Film Festival in April 2017.

== Premise ==
On the day he is set to star in a career-changing film, an Irish actor with a self-destructive past confronts a series of events that threaten his sobriety, his loved ones, and his life.

== Cast ==
- Emmett Hughes as Tristan Blake
- Emily Bett Rickards as Caitlin (voice)
- Amber Nash as Radio Host (voice)
- Paula Malcomson as Gráinne (voice)
- Jonathan Sadowski as Hemingway (voice)
- Jean-Luc Bilodeau as Barry (voice)
- Ciarán Hinds as Jim (voice)
- Paget Brewster as Dr. Lynch (voice)
- Aisha Tyler as Louise (voice)
- Thomas Gibson as Joseph (voice)
- Kirsten Vangsness as Heather (voice)
- Kevin Pollak as Cru (voice)
- Bronagh Waugh as Siobhán (voice)
- Lucky Yates as Radio Host (voice)
- Caroline Morahan as Susan (voice)
- Nelson Estevez as Gio (voice)
- Fionn William O'Brien as Declan (voice)
- Sam Rockwell as himself (voice)
- Jerry Ferrara as himself (voice)

== Development ==
=== Background ===
Having worked together in 2015 to produce the Irish language short film Ar Scáth le Chéile, written by and starring Hughes and directed by Tyler, the pair decided to collaborate on a full feature length film, with Hughes again writing and starring, Tyler directing and both of them acting as producer.

=== Kickstarter Campaign ===
Tyler launched a Kickstarter campaign in April 2016. Part of her motivation for using Kickstarter as a means to raise funds for the project was the limited time scale she had available. With a short break available in her schedule in 2016, Tyler wished to bypass the lengthy process of studio funding, and get her project moving as quickly as possible. The campaign initially aimed to raise $150 000 in order to greenlight the project, secure cast and crew and begin the ADR process, which would enable Tyler to approach additional funding sources for assistance. Overall, the campaign raised over $193 000.

== Production ==
The film was shot in Los Angeles. Filming began on May 28, 2016 and took place over the following seven days. The film was shot almost entirely from inside the principal character Tristen's (Hughes) car, which allowed Tyler to shoot the film, in her words, "like a play" - recording the whole script daily. The additional voice dialogue provided by the rest of the cast was recorded prior to filming, both in person and remotely.

== Release ==
The film premiered at the 19th annual Sarasota Film Festival on April 7, 2017, where it competed in the "Independent Visions" section of the competition. Tyler also took part in the festival's "In Conversation With.." series. It was also an official selection of the 18th Annual Newport Beach Film Festival in April 2017, where Tyler was honored with the "Artist of Distinction Award" and the film was awarded the "Outstanding Achievement in Filmmaking:Feature Film" award at the festival.

Axis was released via video-on-demand on April 10, 2018.

== Awards and nominations ==
| Award / Film Festival | Category | Result | Ref |
|---|---|---|---|
| Nashville Film Festival | New Directors Competition: Aisha Tyler | Nominated | |
| Sarasota Film Festival | Independent Visions Award | Nominated | |
| Newport Beach Film Festival | Outstanding Achievement in Filmmaking: Feature Film | Won | |
