= Jarod Joseph =

Canadian actor (born 1985)

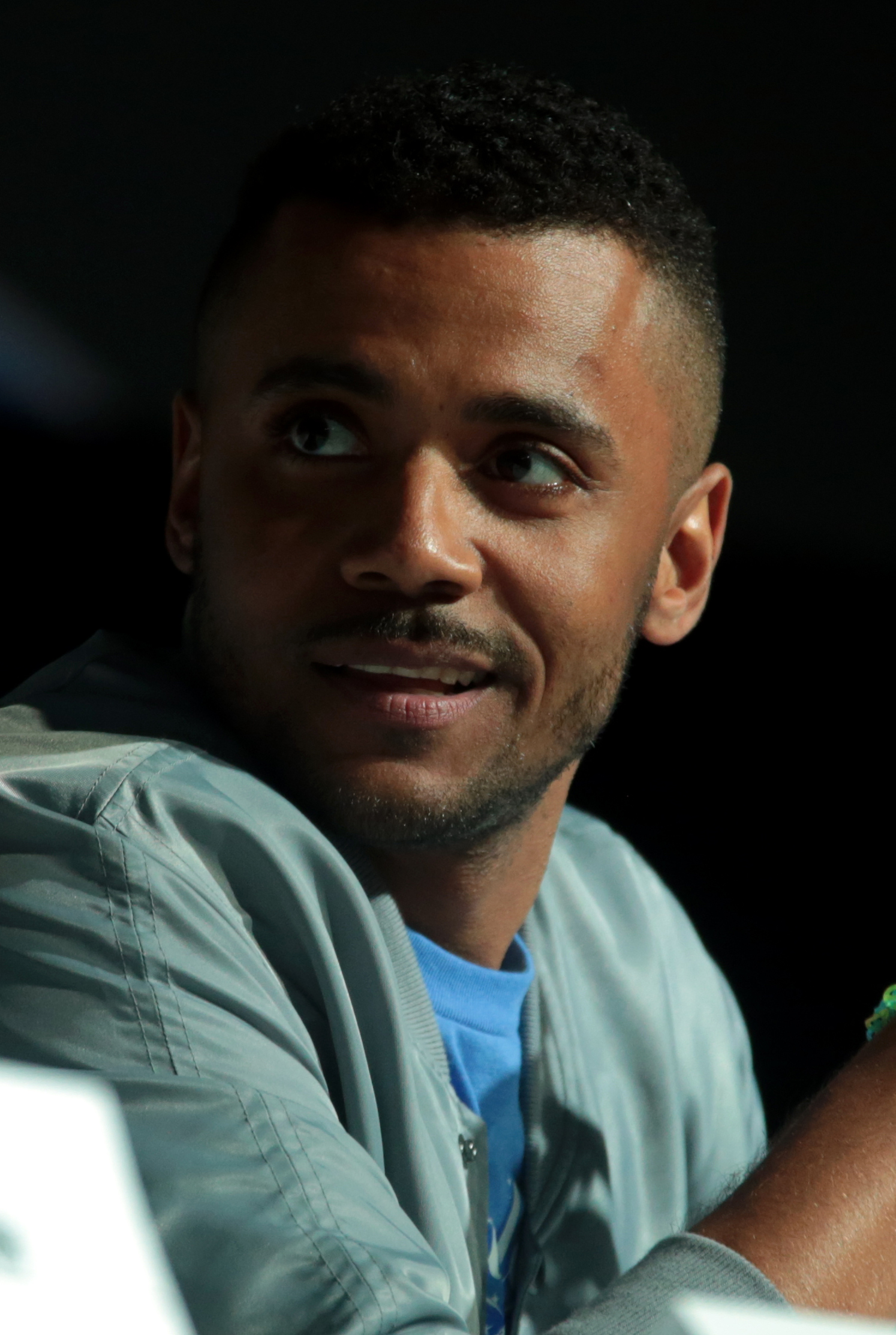
- Jarod Joseph at WonderCon 2018
- Born: October 9, 1985 (age 40); Calgary, Alberta
- Occupation: Actor
- Years active: 2010-present

Jarod Joseph (born October 9, 1985) is a Canadian actor who has had roles as Nathan Miller in The 100, Nicholas Fleming in Rogue, Wilson Corvo in Mistresses, and Cas Isakovic's dead brother in Another Life.

== Biography ==
Jarod Joseph grew up in Calgary and was initially interested in sports. Jarod considered taking on basketball or hockey, but abandoned these goals as he felt the need to focus on his grades instead. At the suggestion of a friend, Jarod decided to pursue acting and drove out to Vancouver to look for jobs. He eventually auditioned for a role in Percy Jackson & the Olympians: The Lightning Thief. Though the role was small, it was a major motion picture and it was enough to interest him in continuing a career.

Immediately afterwards, Jarod found himself thrown into television roles over the next several years. He was cast as Detective Nicholas Fleming in Rogue a role that made him nervous as it was his first time as a regular. "My first day on the job was actually a week-and-a-half after most of the cast and crew had already begun working together. There was an established dynamic and rapport that I wasn’t privy to, so I was a little worried about blending in with everyone and doing my thing." While filming Rogue, Jarod began working in recurring roles as Gus / Billy in Once Upon a Time and FBI Agent Tim in Fringe and made guest roles in Arrow, Motive, V, Showcase’s Endgame and AMC’s The Killing.

Jarod was cast as Nathan Miller in The CW TV series The 100 of which he is a major recurring character.

== Television ==
Year	Title	Role	Notes
2010	Percy Jackson & the Olympians: The Lightning Thief	College Buddy	Movie
2010	Tower Prep	Howard Gilmore	Episode: "Monitored"
2010	Human Target	Guard (Larry)/Cop	2 episodes
2010	Smoke Screen	Clerk	TV movie
2010-2012	Fringe	FBI Agent Tim	6 episodes
2011	Taken from Me: The Tiffany Rubin Story	Marine Guard	TV movie
2011	V	Med Tech	Episode: "Uneasy Lies the Head"
2011	Endgame	Sister's Boyfriend	Episode: "The Other Side of Summer"
2011	Chasing Mood	Melrick Jr.	Recurring
2011	The Killing	Muhammed Hamid	Episode: "Undertow"
2011	A Mile in His Shoes	Pee Wee	TV movie
2011	Innocent	Orestes Mauro	TV movie
2011-2016	Once Upon a Time	Gus / Billy	6 episodes
2012	The L.A. Complex	Christopher Taylor	Recurring
2012	Echos	Tracey	TV movie
2013	Arrow	Alan Durand	3 episodes
2013	Rogue	Nicholas Fleming	Main cast
2013	The Tomorrow People	Juergens	Episode: "Limbo"
2014	Sea of Fire	Dep. Ray Halverson	TV movie
2014	Signed, Sealed, Delivered	Cameron	Episode: "To Whom It May Concern"
2014–2020	The 100	Nathan Miller	Recurring
2015	Backstrom	Charles Turner	Episode: "Charles Turner"
2015	Away and Back	Tim McMurray	TV movie
2015	Wayward Pines	Jimmy	Episode: "Where Paradise Is Home"
2015	Coded	Shae	Recurring
2015	My One Christmas Wish	Trevor	TV movie
2015-2016	Mistresses	Wilson Corvo	Recurring
2016	Star Trek Beyond	Control Tower Technician	Movie
2016–2018	You Me Her	Andy Cutler	Recurring
2017	Saving Hope	Dr. Emmanuel Palmer	Recurring
2018	The Christmas Pact	Ben	TV movie
2020	The Christmas Aunt	Drew	TV movie
2021	Another Life	Anthony Isakovic	Episode: "My Own Worst Enemy"
2024	Sight Unseen	Matt Alleyne	Recurring
