= Rogue (TV series) =

2013 Canadian-British police drama television series

- Genre: Crime drama; Police procedural; Thriller; Action
- Created by: Matthew Parkhill
- Starring: Thandiwe Newton; Sarah Jeffery; Kavan Smith; Ian Tracey; Marton Csokas; Joshua Sasse; Matthew Beard; Leah Gibson; Ian Hart; Jarod Joseph; Claudia Ferri; Cole Hauser; Andrea Roth; Clare Higgins; Alec Newman; Brendan Fletcher; Cindy Sampson; Sarah Carter; Derek Luke; Bianca Lawson; Michael Murphy; Richard Schiff; Ashley Greene; Sergio Di Zio; Meaghan Rath; Neal McDonough; Kristin Lehman
- Opening theme: "Too Tough to Die" by Martina Topley-Bird (season 1) "Sorrowing Man" by City and Colour (season 2) "Top Shelf Drug" by Ryan Bingham (season 3)
- Composer: Jeff Toyne
- Countries of origin: Canada; United Kingdom; United States
- Original language: English
- No. of seasons: 4
- No. of episodes: 50 (list of episodes)

Production
- Executive producers: John Morayniss; Michael Rosenberg; Nick Hamm; Steven Marrs; Matthew Parkhill
- Production location: Vancouver, British Columbia
- Production companies: Entertainment One Television; Greenroom Entertainment (Seasons 1-2); Momentum Pictures; Mookville (Season 4)

Original release
- Network: Audience; The Movie Network; Movie Central
- Release: April 3, 2013 – May 24, 2017

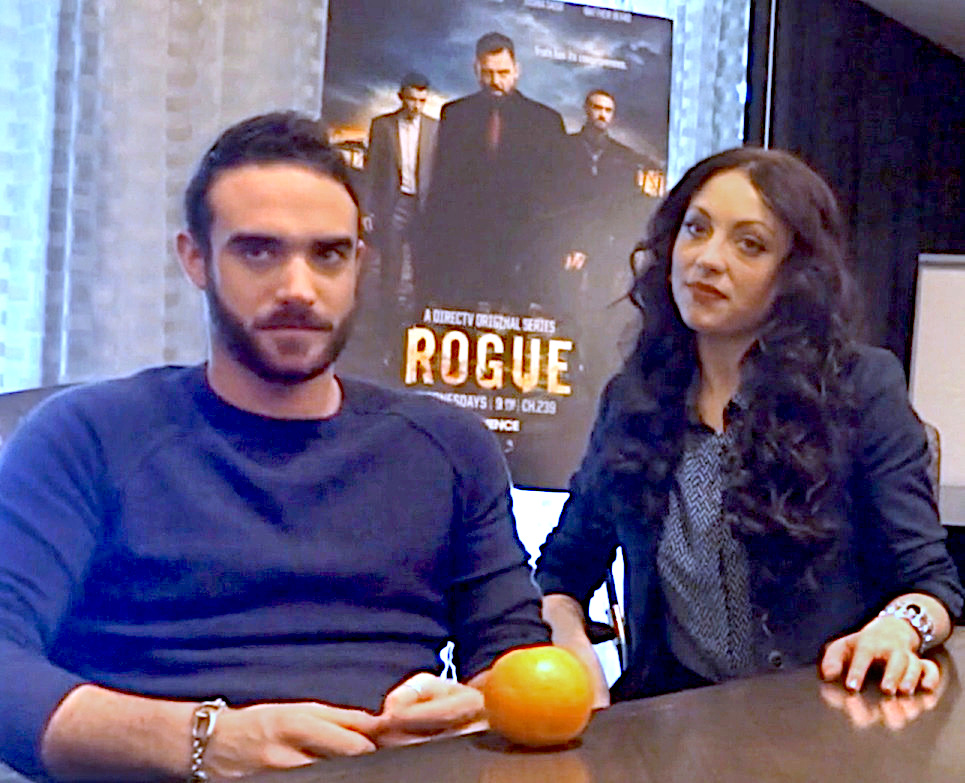
Rogue Interview with Joshua Sasse and Leah Gibson 2013

Rogue is a police drama television series created by Matthew Parkhill and starring Thandiwe Newton. The series is a Canadian-British-American co-production, which was co-commissioned by DirecTV's Audience network and the Canadian premium services The Movie Network and Movie Central. The series aired from April 3, 2013 to May 24, 2017. A total of 50 episodes were produced.

The series is set in San Francisco Bay Area and Chicago, but it was filmed in Vancouver.

== Premise ==
Grace Travis begins as a San Jose police officer working undercover in Oakland to bring down Jimmy Laszlo's criminal enterprise. After Grace's son is murdered, she and Jimmy discover they have a common purpose.

In the second season, Grace takes a new job as a handler for an FBI task force investigating corporate espionage in San Francisco. When a female undercover operative goes missing, Grace is forced undercover where she meets Ethan, a charming and enigmatic security consultant who might be responsible for the disappearance, or even death, of the operative.

In the third season, Grace is convinced that Ethan is key to her survival and goes to Chicago. There, Ethan infiltrates the firm of notorious attorney and power broker Marty Stein, whose dealings are shown to extend into one of Chicago's most feared gangs. Meanwhile, Ethan meets Marlon Dinard, a respectable, high-end store owner, who also seems to have more going on than meets the eye. Ethan tracks him and his half-sister Talia. When a reporter who nearly discovers the depths of Marty's empire winds up dead, federal agent Harper Deakins investigates his death. Grace and Ethan work together to bring down those who murdered her son and have Ethan under their thumb. A powerful conspiracy that connects the white-collar boardrooms to the gangs of Chicago is ultimately revealed.

== Episodes ==
Season	Episodes		Originally released	
Season	Episodes		First released	Last released
1	10		April 3, 2013	May 29, 2013
2	10		May 28, 2014	July 30, 2014
3	20	10	June 24, 2015	August 26, 2015
3	20	10	March 23, 2016	May 25, 2016
4	10		March 22, 2017	May 24, 2017

== Cast and characters ==
=== Main ===
- Thandiwe Newton (credited as Thandie Newton) as Grace Travis (main seasons 1–2, recurring season 3): a rogue undercover cop whose career path has taken a toll on her personal life. She is Evie's mother and estranged wife of Tom.
- Sarah Jeffery as Evie Travis (main seasons 1–2, recurring season 3): Grace's feisty but caring teenage daughter.
- Kavan Smith as Tom Travis (seasons 1–2): Grace's ex-husband.
- Ian Tracey as Lucas "Mitch" Mitchel (season 1): Detective of the Santa Fe PD investigating Sam Travis death. He helps her investigate "off-book", and is one of Grace's only long-term friends.
- Marton Csokas as Jimmy Laszlo (season 1): Head of the Laszlo family, and known mob leader.
- Joshua Sasse as Alec Laszlo (season 1, recurring season 2): First son of Jimmy Laszlo with a violent history.
- Matthew Beard as Max Laszlo (season 1): Jimmy Laszlo second son, business school graduate, just released from prison.
- Leah Gibson as Cathy Laszlo (season 1): Wife of Alex Laszlo.
- Ian Hart as Buddy Wilson (season 1): An Oakland PD detective with an unconventional investigating method who helps Grace and Mitch.
- Jarod Joseph as Nicholas Fleming (season 1): A young detective of the Oakland Police Department.
- Claudia Ferri as Sophia Hernandez (season 1): Lieutenant of the Oakland Police Department.
- Cole Hauser as Ethan Kelly (seasons 2–4): a college-educated ex-soldier who, as an overseas military contractor, was the leader of a gang of four who stole a large sum of money from the U.S. government. At the end of series two he is blackmailed by the general who catches him and decides to work for the general (series three) rather than confess and expose the conspiracy. In the fourth season he falls into a hellish labyrinth of criminality and betrayal by the police.
- Andrea Roth as Leni Kastner (season 2): An FBI Special Agent and second in command in the task force, she is Grace's handler. She continues to believe in Grace and is instrumental in exposing the conspiracy. Ultimately she turns against Grace, deciding to not expose the conspiracy and cover-up.
- Clare Higgins as Vivian Travis (season 2): Grace's estranged mother.
- Alec Newman as Ray Williams (season 2): A member of Ethan Kelly's platoon.
- Brendan Fletcher as Brian "Spud" Cacelle (season 2): A member of Ethan Kelly's platoon, he has PTSD.
- Cindy Sampson as Sophie Hale (season 3).
- Sarah Carter as DEA Agent Harper Deakins (season 3): A member of a federal task force formed to control Chicago's gang problem whose unwillingness to back down exposes a vast conspiracy. She is killed by Mia.
- Derek Luke as Marlon Dinard (season 3): a respectable owner of a chandelier store who is also the head of a Chicago gang
- Bianca Lawson as Talia Freeman (season 3): Marlon's half-sister who seeks to make a name for her own self, but her rash behavior constantly draws Marlon's attention
- Michael Murphy as George Kelly (season 3): Ethan's father.
- Richard Schiff as Marty Stein (main season 3, recurring season 4): a powerful Chicago lawyer that represents CEOs, judges, the Chicago Bulls, and mobsters, while having them all in his back pocket.
- Ashley Greene as Mia Rochland (seasons 3–4): in season four Mia seeks revenge and will stop at nothing to make Ethan pay for double-crossing her. She was shot by Sadie and later killed by Patrick.
- Sergio Di Zio as Patrick Finnegan (seasons 3–4): A Chicago police detective, Harper Deakins' partner on the federal task force. Seeks revenge on Mia for Harper's death.
- Meaghan Rath as Clea Annou (season 4): a sharp San Francisco police detective with relentless dedication to her job and her family.
- Neal McDonough as Casey Oaks (season 4): a dirty detective in San Francisco, working in support of Ombello.
- Kristin Lehman as Theresa Archer (season 4): Ombello's CEO, a management consultant firm who provides trafficked girls to their clients.

=== Recurring ===
- Martin Donovan as Richard Campbell (seasons 1–3): A corrupt Deputy Chief of Police, he plays the gangs against each other.
- Aleksa Palladino as Sarah Finnelly (seasons 2–3): An undercover agent who disappears at the start of season two. It's then discovered that she stole a large amount of cash from her mark after her superiors force her to have sex with him. She manages to leverage the government to keep her freedom and her job. During season three, she helps Grace.
- Clayne Crawford as Danny 'Cheat' Chetowski (season 2): The first of the gang to die. His drug use and his spending of the money risks blowing the gang’s cover.
- Rupert Evans as Elliot Howe (season 2): Head of the task force investigating Excelsior Intelligence. He cannot reconcile not knowing why they are investigating, with his position in the "need to know" chain.
- Brian Markinson as Lloyd Roberts (season 3): senior aide to DOD General Howard and his handler for Ethan.
- April Telek as Donna Williams (seasons 2–4): Ray's wife.
- Kevin Hanchard as Nate Lowry (seasons 3–4): Deakins and Finnegan's superior officer.
- Peter James Bryant as Captain Frank Sleader (season 4): Clea Annou's superior officer, a captain in San Francisco police.
- Tom Butler as Monty Annou (season 4): Clea Annou's father who owns a restaurant.
- Emmanuelle Vaugier as Regan Faulkner (season 4): Ethan's longtime friend, she is assistant district attorney.
- Eve Harlow as Sadie (season 4): Mia's ex-lover who resides in San Francisco. It is revealed that she had helped Mia hack into the NSA. Sadie is offered a plea deal for a sentence of just probation if she will testify to Mia’s involvement in the hacking. She refuses to snitch on Mia and is sent to jail for 16 months. She is raped during her time in jail. Sadie eventually sides with Ethan and betrays Mia. She shoots Mia in the back and leaves her to be murdered by Patrick Finnegan.

== Production ==
The series' ten-episode second season aired from May 28 through July 30, 2014. On August 12, 2014, DirecTV renewed the series for 20 additional episodes. On August 1, 2016 Rogue was renewed for a fourth and final season by Audience, which premiered March 22, 2017.

Thandie Newton discussed her traumatic experiences with Rogue in Vulture in 2020; she was upset by being the token Black person for a show set in Oakland, California, was forced into a topless scene, and wasn't released from her second-season contract. When Newton declined to do the nude scene, she stated that Matthew Parkhill, the showrunner and executive producer, asked her scene partner to pull down her top forcibly without consent. Newton was written off the show in the third season, with her character's body in a "Westworld Garbage Disposal" container, a nod to her next show, Westworld'.

== Reception ==
Rogue received mixed reviews. Metacritic gave the first season a "mixed or average" score of 47 out of 100, based on 14 critics. On Rotten Tomatoes, it held a 38-percent rating with an average rating of 4.9 out of 10, based on eight reviews.

== Broadcast ==
In the United States, the show aired on Audience from April 3, 2013 to May 24, 2017. In Canada, it aired on The Movie Network and Movie Central and on Super Écran, on Investigation and on Series+ in French-speaking Canada.

The series was then sold to many other broadcasters. In Australia, the series premiered on 3 August 2015 on SoHo, while in Bulgaria it premiered on 11 April 2017 on VIVACOM Arena, VIVACOM's own 24/7 movie channel. The show also aired on Filmbox in Hungary and on Fox Crime in Asia. Episodes were also dubbed in Poland, Czech and Latin America. It was dubbed into Germany somewhere in 2015.

== Home media and streaming ==
In the United States and Canada, Entertainment One released the first season on a four-disc DVD set on March 11, 2014, containing all 10 episodes of the first season, and also includes a Script to Screen: Behind-the-Scenes Featurette and the webisodes of Rogue Files: Reparation, which is not shown on television. On the Canadian release of the DVD, it also has a French audio track that was seen on Super Écran. The second season was released on DVD on May 19, 2015, also in a four-disc set. All four seasons of the series was surprisingly released on Blu-ray in Germany.

In the United States, the episodes of the series were previously made available for free on Tubi from 2023 to 2024. Currently, the series is available on FreeTV in the United States, which also includes a Spanish audio track. Some episodes of the series are available on Amazon Prime Video, Roku Channel and Amazon Freevee In the United Kingdom, it is available on Pluto TV.
