= Anna Mae Wills =

Canadian actress

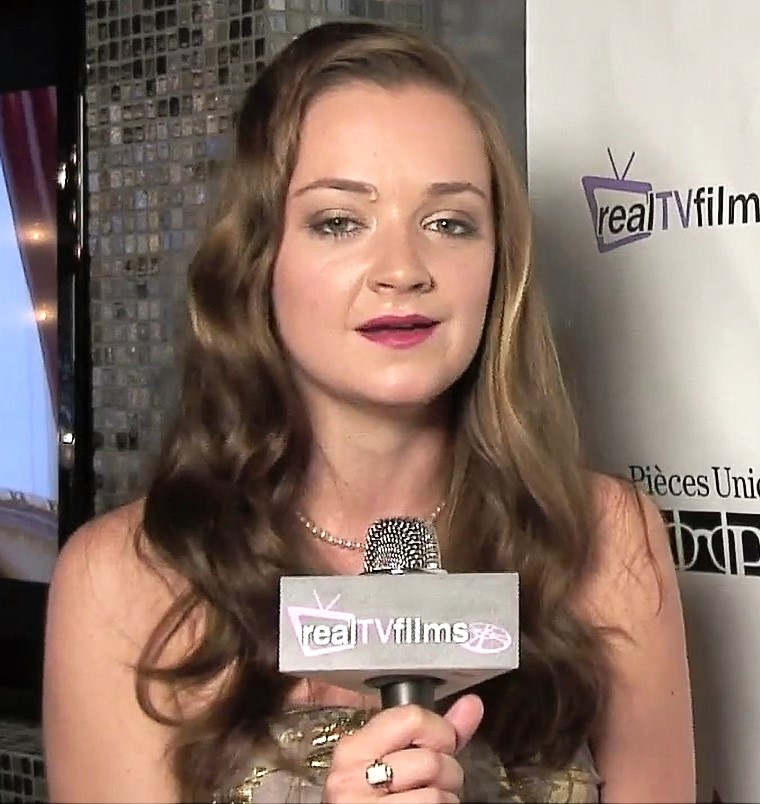
- Routledge at the Toronto International Film Festival in 2010
- Born: Anna Mae Routledge; March 31, 1982 (age 44); Calgary, Alberta, Canada
- Other name: Anna Routledge
- Education: University of Windsor (BFA)
- Occupation: Actress
- Years active: 2006–2015
- Spouse: Akshay Kanwar (m. 2018)
- Children: 1

Anna Mae Wills (born Anna Mae Routledge; March 31, 1982) is a Canadian former actress. She is best known for her role as Celeste in 16 Wishes.

== Early life and education ==
Wills was born in Calgary, Alberta. She graduated from the University of Windsor in 2004 with a BFA.

== Career ==
Wills appeared in CBS's Harper's Island in the recurring role of Kelly Seavers. She was also in Hallmark Hall of Fame's A Dog Named Christmas, starring Bruce Greenwood, and has been in episodes of Life Unexpected, Smallville, Supernatural and Psych.

Her feature film credits include 2012, directed by Roland Emmerich, and I Love You, Beth Cooper, directed by Chris Columbus.

== Filmography ==
Film
Year	Film	Notes
2008	Another Cinderella Story	extra (uncredited)
2009	I Love You, Beth Cooper ++	as Patty Keck
2009	Harper's Island ++	as Kelly Seaver (TV series, 3 episodes)
2009	2012 ++	as Arc Naval Officer
2010	16 Wishes ++	as Celeste
2010	Amazon Falls ++	as Li
2011	A Mile in His Shoes ++	as Lacey
2013	The Killing	as Skanky Girl (TV series, 1 episode)

++ - credited as Anna Mae Routledge

== Personal life ==
On June 16, 2018, Wills married her husband Akshay Kanwar. On December 25, 2020, Wills announced she was pregnant with their first child. Their first child, a daughter, was born two weeks later on January 8, 2021.

Together, they reside in Vancouver, British Columbia, Canada with their dog named Yoshi whom they adopted in 2016.

In November 2018, Wills revealed she has suffered from epilepsy for most of her life.

Wills is an advocate for Mental Health Awareness.
