= A Mile in His Shoes =

- Film poster
- Screenplay by: Jason Koornick
- Story by: Frank Nappi (The Legend of Mickey Tussler)
- Directed by: William Dear
- Starring: Dean Cain; Luke Schroder
- Music by: Stu Goldberg
- Country of origin: Canada
- Original language: English

Production
- Producers: Tara Cowell-Plain; Dureyshevar; Jason Koornick; Jack Nasser; Joseph Nasser; Dan Spilo; Danny Webber
- Cinematography: C. Kim Miles
- Running time: 89 minutes

Original release
- Release: September 5, 2011

A Mile in His Shoes is a 2011 Canadian made-for-television sports drama film directed by William Dear and starring Luke Schroder, George Canyon and Dean Cain. It was based on the 2008 novel The Legend of Mickey Tussler by Frank Nappi. The setting was changed from Ohio in 1948 in the novel to Bargersville, Indiana in 2002 in the film.

== Plot ==
The film centers on Mickey Tussler (Luke Schroder), an 18-year-old from Indiana with Asperger syndrome. Arthur Murphy (Dean Cain) who sees Mickey pitching apples in his backyard recognizes that the boy has a lot of potential as a pitcher. He convinces Mickey's parents to let him come with him to be a part of "the River Rats", a semi-professional baseball team. He pairs Mickey with a teammate named Pee Wee who takes Mickey under his wing.

Mickey is accepted by most of the team, except the top pitcher who feels threatened by Mickey's growing competence on the mound. With the help of the coach and Pee Wee, Mickey learns to manage the sensory overload he experiences on the field and pitch well through it.

Eventually, through his success on the field, Mickey proves to himself and to his parents that he has talent, he has a voice, and his autism cannot stop him from achieving his dreams.

== Cast ==
- Luke Schroder as Mickey Tussler
- Dean Cain as Arthur "Murph" Murphy
- George Canyon as Clarence
- Chilton Crane as Molly Tussler
- Jarod Joseph as Pee Wee
- Jesse Hutch as George "Lefty" Rogers
- Andrew Wheeler as Warren Dennison
- Jaren Brandt Bartlett as Raymond "Boxcar" Miller
- Anna Mae Wills as Laney Juris
- Matthew Robert Kelly as Chip McNally
- Lee Tichon as Rocco Hightower
- Kenneth W. Yanko as Sheriff Billings
- Paul Jarrett as Pastor Bob

== Background ==
The movie is adapted from the 2008 novel The Legend of Mickey Tussler by Frank Nappi, which was the first of a series. The subsequent novels, "Sophomore Campaign" and "Welcome to the Show", delve deeper into the mind and experiences of Mickey, as well as those closest to him.

== Reception ==
A Mile in His Shoes was reviewed by Common Sense Media and Dove.org, both of which felt favorably about the film. Jonathan Plummer commented upon the film, praising it for its "positive view of someone who is neurologically diverse and is made believable and watchable by the script, direction, and performances".

== See also ==
- List of baseball films
