= List of Rogue (TV series) episodes =

Rogue, a police crime drama television series, premiered on DirecTV's Audience network on April 3, 2013, and ended on May 24, 2017. The series stars Thandie Newton and was filmed in Vancouver, British Columbia, Canada.

During the course of the series, 50 episodes of Rogue aired over four seasons.

== Series overview ==
| Season | Episodes | | Originally released | |
| Season | Episodes | | First released | Last released |
|---|---|---|---|---|
| 1 | 10 | | April 3, 2013 | May 29, 2013 |
| 2 | 10 | | May 28, 2014 | July 30, 2014 |
| 3 | 20 | 10 | June 24, 2015 | August 26, 2015 |
| 3 | 20 | 10 | March 23, 2016 | May 25, 2016 |
| 4 | 10 | | March 22, 2017 | May 24, 2017 |

== Episodes ==
=== Season 1 (2013) ===
| No. overall | No. in season | Title | Directed by | Written by | Original release date |
|---|---|---|---|---|---|
| 1 | 1 | "The Aquarium" | Brian Kirk | Matthew Parkhill | April 3, 2013 |
Undercover in Oakland as "Jackie", San Jose police detective Grace Travis arranges a meeting with Russian drug smuggler Gridenko and crime boss Jimmy Laszlo. Before any deals can be made, the police arrive and all parties scatter. Grace is told that her son has been killed from a drive-by shooting at school. Four months later, on leave, she cannot use police facilities to investigate. However, Detective "Mitch" Mitchell gives her a clue regarding the ammo used. Meanwhile, Jimmy wants go legit and get out of the business, but his accountant is killed. Against her boss's wishes, Grace wants back in Jimmy's crew, and Jimmy allows it. They set up another meeting with Gridenko, and Grace is shot trying to protect Jimmy. Another detective learns of this and Grace must give him information about the shooting. The bullet from Grace is the same as the one that killed her son. While Grace realizes Gridenko's family is in mourning and cannot be responsible for her being shot, Jimmy meets with a mole from the police department. As she is packing up her cover apartment, Jimmy arrives to take her for a ride. He calls her by her actual name and she knows her cover is blown.
| 2 | 2 | "Fireball" | David Frazee | Jesse McKeown | April 3, 2013 |
In order to save her own life, Grace reveals to Jimmy the connection between his accountant and her son's death – the bullets that killed both are homemade. Someone is moving against Jimmy. While he frantically checks out his crew, including the empty bank account his own accountant failed to maintain, Grace gets suspended with pay, pending a psychiatric evaluation and investigation. Mitch checks Jimmy's files, while two of his detectives get caught in a fire investigating the tag number Grace provided. Jimmy invites her to a family party welcoming home his former prisoner son, Max. There, Jimmy tells Grace that she was right. He has a traitor in his crew, but doesn't know who it is. He makes a deal with her: he helps find her son's killer and she helps find his traitor.
| 3 | 3 | "Cathy's Song" | Larysa Kondracki | Angus Fraser | April 10, 2013 |
The Oakland police believe Jimmy Laszlo's syndicate set the restaurant fire that injured two cops, out of retaliation for the accountant's death. Jimmy informs his son Alec, who had the fire set, that his intended target, the Lee brothers, had nothing to do with recent events. Grace suggests Jimmy offer the police his full cooperation. He agrees, but only if she first ensures they have nothing on him. She later reports to Jimmy that he is clear. While he goes to the station, she collects his crew's cell phones from his office drawer. She gives them to Mitch, who doesn't take them until she suggests a cop nearly got her killed. In interrogation, Jimmy expresses remorse for the firebombing, adding he doesn't want a war started. Upon the suggestion of retribution, Jimmy offers faith the police will solve the accountant's murder. Campbell orders a search of Jimmy's office, but nothing is found. When Jimmy realizes the phones are missing, Grace panics, insisting Mitch puts a rush on scrubbing them. A meeting is held with the Lee family. They want money or blood in the truce. Jimmy doesn't have the amount requested, so they are given the heads of the two firebombers. Mitch plots a map from the cell phones. None were used near where Grace's son was killed, but he does see a pattern.
| 4 | 4 | "Sweet and Sour" | Jon Jones | Lizzie Mickery | April 17, 2013 |
Grace and Jimmy meet. He doesn't care about the raid; he only wants the phones returned. She tells him a member of his crew has been receiving empty texts from untraceable numbers, signaling the recipient to come to a specific location. Grace tells him Charlie is text recipient, but adds he is just a foot soldier. They need the mastermind. Lt. Hernandez appears to be letting up on Jimmy, possibly signifying she is the mole. After Jimmy tries to scare Charlie by driving by his meeting spot, Grace suggests doing things her way. Jimmy tells Max about the missing money, which was intended to go toward purchasing a bank. Max promises checking into it. Charlie meets Grace at a bar. After exchanging histories, including that he is deep in debt, he asks if she is after Jimmy's money. She says no. She later tells Jimmy about Charlie's debt and has possibly turned. Mitch then informs her that a text was sent near her son's school to Charlie on the day of the shooting. She and Jimmy visit Charlie at his house, where she attacks him and must be led out by Jimmy, who then tells Charlie to come to him for anything. They try to bait Charlie into a meeting, but later find he has shot and killed himself.
| 5 | 5 | "Hawala" | Mike Barker | Matthew Parkhill | April 24, 2013 |
Grace refuses to believe Charlie committed suicide. She and Jimmy survey the contents of his safe, which creates a pseudo-partnership between them. They chat about their respective families, until she suggests Alec's decision to firebomb the restaurant was to damage his father's reputation. This suggestion angers Jimmy. Max tells Jimmy some of the accountant's receipts found were from a hawala transaction involving international money transactions. The two go to a laundromat, which is a cover for the hawala business. There, they learn the accountant made several five-million-dollar transactions out of the country. Alec takes it upon himself to manage Charlie's business. Max tells Jimmy he saw the two men talking, and, suspicious, Jimmy gives the business to Max. Grace asks Mitch to trace the money from Charlie's safe. He tells her the money was loaned from the U.S. Treasury to undercover federal agent Michael Chen, who killed himself four months ago when discovered to be a dirty cop. Grace recalls Chen never showing for a meeting with her, set up by Wilson. She suspects Chen's and Charlie's suicides are related. Wilson says Hernandez wanted him to meet Chen, but he made Grace do it. Chen was investigating money laundering, when he came across Jimmy's name. After meeting with Chen's widow, Grace is forced off the road by an armed motorcyclist. Jimmy comes to her rescue. She calls her husband to check on him, and he is revealed to be having an affair with their daughter's teacher. At a hotel, Grace and Jimmy kiss after he tends her wounds.
| 6 | 6 | "The Second Amendment" | Peter Howitt | Michelle Paradise | May 1, 2013 |
Grace admits to Jimmy that she is no longer a cop, but still has inside help. She calls Mitch to tell him about the motorcyclist and that it must be linked to Chen. They are being monitored. Jimmy says he no longer trusts his police mole and accidentally mentions his stolen money. Disguised as a neighborhood watch member, Jimmy gets invited by Tom into the Travis family home, where he meets Grace's daughter. Alec finds Max at Jimmy's desk, checking recent tax returns. Charlie's business has received inexplicable income. Alec tells him to get out of Jimmy's chair and they fight. Grace tells Mitch that the mole is not Hernandez, but a man. He shows her the evidence from Chen's death. The bullets match those used in Sam's and the accountant's deaths. The casings were also marked and could be traced. Jimmy informs Max that Charlie took money from Chen. He asks Max to see if the accountant was also involved. Grace updates Jimmy about Chen and that the bullets were traced to a shooting range. There, a guard tells them a survivalist collects the shell casings. In the woods, they find Jonah Mann. Jimmy must rough him up to hear he sold bullets to Charlie. Grace finds fast food wrappers and recalls Max saying he drove a long way to get a hamburger. Max and Jonah know each other. They served time together in jail, where Grace learns the accountant visited Max before Chen's and his own death. Max is sent a picture of Grace with a warning she asked about him at the jail. She meets him at a bar, and Mitch calls to tell her Max is on to her. She tries to run from Max.
| 7 | 7 | "Rumpus" | Larysa Kondracki | Lizzie Mickery | May 8, 2013 |
Max abandons pursuing Grace, now on a public street. He calls and meets his police mole, Deputy Chief Campbell, who tells him "Jackie" is no longer a cop. Her actions are her own. The Max/Campbell partnership becomes clear. Campbell turned from Jimmy when Chan told the Oakland PD the accountant laundered his money. Campbell allied with Max, now in possession of it. He orders Max to kill Grace. Mitch and Grace discuss Max and to whom he reports. She insists Jimmy needs to know; Mitch cautions her. When she tells Jimmy, he is upset with her suggesting Max is involved. Max tells Alec about Grace, and they are concerned for Jimmy. He also tells him she knows who torched the restaurant. Alec needs to silence her. He tells Jimmy what Max has said. Upset, Jimmy thinks Alec is just jealous of Max. When he asks who else know about "Jackie", Alec realizes the truth and feels betrayed. Jimmy questions Max about the accountant visiting him in prison. Max says it regarded starting a new business of his own. He also believes Grace is playing them, adding that he has been going against his father. Jimmy is distraught. The FBI tells Mitch where Chen was operating. The location was where Grace was supposed to meet him. They go there and she sees a billboard for Dragon Brewery. She recalls Sam, who was with her that day, drew pictures of a dragon afterwards, only adding a star around its neck. Campbell issues a warrant for Max's arrest to protect him. Mitch tracks Max to the docks and Grace heads there alone. When she arrives, a sniper shoots up her car and it crashes. Max finds an empty car. She ambushes him, asking why he had her son killed. Max is upset that this was all over a kid. He claims innocence and she hesitates shooting him. A struggle ensues, and he is accidentally shot in the head and dies.
| 8 | 8 | "A House Is Not a Home" | Nick Murphy | Daniel Goldfarb | May 15, 2013 |
Grace douses Max's body with gasoline and sets the pier on fire. She showers at the motel and Jimmy arrives. He is distraught over failing Max, and she is fearful of Jimmy learning she has killed him. The pier fire becomes known. A body, believed to be a vagrant, is found, but Jimmy worries when he cannot reach his sons. Grace gets reinstated at her probation hearing in San Jose. Jimmy enters the Oakland PD, looking for answers. He asks Hernandez to view the charred remains from the pier. The body is unidentifiable, but he recognizes a watch belonging to either of his sons. He visits Alec's house, but his wife hasn't seen him. Alec, who has been camping, arrives and Jimmy knows Max is dead, but he thinks Alec killed him. A weapon is found at the burned pier, while Grace visits Jimmy. She tells him to not seek revenge. The prints on the weapon match hers, and Mitch calls her about it. Jimmy meets with Campbell, who tells him about Grace's prints. Grace spends some time with her daughter and arrives home before she is arrested in front of her family.
| 9 | 9 | "Chasing the Dragon" | Larysa Kondracki | Jesse McKeown | May 22, 2013 |
Grace is processed at Oakland PD, where Fleming finds a crumpled drawing of a dragon with a star around its neck among her possessions. Jimmy wants to make peace with Alec, who hates Jimmy for bringing Grace into the business. He also thinks Jimmy believes the wrong son died. Mitch is given five minutes with Grace, who tells him to walk away and not get taken out as she will be. He promises to find the mole. Grace's lawyer advises her confession and plea of manslaughter. Jimmy, Tom and his daughter arrive at the station. She recognizes Jimmy from meeting him. Tom asks a policeman who Jimmy is and is told he's a crime boss whose son has just been murdered. Mitch sees Wilson steal evidence from Max's case box. Wilson says he is also trying to find the mole. Hernandez interviews Jimmy about Grace, who was fixated on her son's death and convinced Max was responsible. Jimmy also alludes to their relationship. In a separate interview, Tom refuses to turn against his wife, even upon learning of her affair with Jimmy. At the office, Jimmy orders a hit on Grace. His men know someone on the inside who can do it. Fleming takes Grace to general holding and asks about the dragon drawing, but she has yet to figure it out. While in holding, a woman fights with her when it is learned she is a cop. Grace is beaten unconscious. Mitch learns Fleming and Max were childhood friends. Alec pleads with his crew to no longer trust Jimmy. At the hospital, Grace wakes and attempts to escape, but Fleming approaches her and starts choking her. He wears his five-star badge around his neck. She loses consciousness, possibly fighting the dragon that Sam saw.
| 10 | 10 | "Killing Grace" | Nick Hamm | Matthew Parkhill | May 29, 2013 |
It's five months ago and Grace is set to meet with Chen. Sam is left in the car, next to the Dragon Brewery sign, while she runs inside. However, Chen is ambushed by Charlie and Fleming on his way to the meeting. Fleming shoots Chen in the head and puts his body in a van. He then notices Sam has just witnessed the entire murder. Fleming approaches him and threatens to kill his parents if he says anything. Sam notes the star on Fleming's chest. In the present, a nurse walks in on Fleming choking Grace, who is able to escape. When she cannot locate Mitch, she goes to Wilson, who helps her. He tells her Max and Fleming were working together to secure Max's turn from Jimmy. Campbell and Fleming also collaborated on Chen's murder. Grace and Wilson find Mitch's apartment wiped clean. She fears he is dead, takes his gun, and visits Fleming's grandmother. Jimmy arranges a deal with the Chinese, his shipping lanes for their muscle. Wilson meets with Jimmy to dissuade him off of Grace. He should be after Fleming, who was working with Max and shot Charlie and the accountant. Alec finds the Chinese has taken over the docks. His father wants a war. Fleming explains to Jimmy what has happened. It was all Max's idea to run Oakland like Jimmy and Campbell, suggesting Fleming become a cop. Fleming killed Chen when Campbell learned Chen was aware of the money laundering. Fleming finds out Grace has visited his grandmother, who is fine but says the woman is at the old Laszlo place. There, Grace subdues him but Jimmy pulls a gun on her. She only wants Fleming to admit killing Sam, which he does. She kills him and later turns herself in. Campbell tells Jimmy he thought he was being cut out of the bank purchase. He wants Jimmy out of Oakland and Alec won't be bothered. Campbell visits Grace, thanking her for taking down the rogue Fleming. He wants her on his team. She reluctantly agrees.

=== Season 2 (2014) ===
| No. overall | No. in season | Title | Directed by | Written by | Original release date |
|---|---|---|---|---|---|
| 11 | 1 | "Sex, Drugs, Rock 'N Roll" | Nick Hamm | Matthew Parkhill | May 28, 2014 |
Grace is on a special FBI task force investigating a prostitution ring. Her home life is complicated by her mother, Vivian, who shows up after a prolonged absence. Tom has something to tell Grace. Ethan and his team negotiate their first contract.
| 12 | 2 | "Saints of the Dead" | Larysa Kondracki | Michelle Lovretta | June 4, 2014 |
Grace confronts Elliot and Leni about looking for Sarah. Evidence is uncovered. Detective Lee becomes a liaison. Elliot reveals to Leni the true nature of their investigation. Ethan, Ray and Spud find out about Cheat and take action.
| 13 | 3 | "You Just Get Used to It" | Larysa Kondracki | Avrum Jacobson | June 11, 2014 |
Grace discovers Ethan hasn't been truthful about the night Cheat died. Leni reaches out to a Pentagon contact to discover how Ethan and his team met. Detective Lee follows Ethan, who, along with his team, feels endangered. Billy and Evie grow closer.
| 14 | 4 | "Hooker" | Julian Jarrold | Story by : Tracey Forbes; Teleplay by : Ira Parker | June 18, 2014 |
Grace contemplates Elliot's proposal that she go undercover. Elliot confronts Leni about speaking to her Pentagon contact. Billy gets into a fight. Spud and Ray find a potential asset who can help them. Ethan meets with a contact to ask about Nina.
| 15 | 5 | "Cruising" | Anand Tucker | Matthew Newman | June 25, 2014 |
Someone from Grace's past visits her, which creates a problem with Ethan. Leni's Pentagon contact reveals new information. Grace finds out about Billy's fight. The taskforce plants a bug to spy on Ethan and his team.
| 16 | 6 | "Killing an Arab" | John Alexander | Matt Jones | July 2, 2014 |
A panicked Spud seeks Ethan's and Ray's help and hatches a plan for leaving town. Grace shares what she learned about Ethan with Leni and Elliot. Alec attempts to alter his deal with Campbell. Elliot makes an arrest which creates problems.
| 17 | 7 | "The Last Supper" | Paul A. Kaufman | Daniel Goldfarb | July 9, 2014 |
Ethan tells Grace they borrowed money from the wrong men. Suspicious, he checks out her background. She tries to help Billy but it backfires. Ray realizes something is wrong with Spud, and they have a heart-to-heart talk.
| 18 | 8 | "Better Red than Dead" | John Alexander | Michelle Lovretta | July 16, 2014 |
Ethan and Ray are forced to decide what to do about Spud. Leni and Grace speculate about the money Ethan has given away. Ethan tracks Grace. Billy tries to win Evie back, and she confronts Grace, who finds a new clue in the search for Sarah.
| 19 | 9 | "Oh Sarah" | Martin Donovan | Matthew Parkhill | July 23, 2014 |
Leni and Grace make a surprise discovery in Vancouver. The truth about Cheat's death is revealed. Ethan and Ray follow their own leads to Vancouver and disagree about what to do with the money. Evie decides to stay with Tom.
| 20 | 10 | "Coup de Grace" | Larysa Kondracki | Matthew Parkhill | July 30, 2014 |
Ethan and Ray fight. Grace apologizes to Evie. Leni and Grace discover the original source of Ethan's money. Sarah and Grace team up to track Ethan and Ray. Grace receives pushback when filing her report. Ethan is visited by high-ranking official. Grace is tasered and abducted, and Evie calls out for her, yielding no response.

=== Season 3 (2015–16) ===
| No. overall | No. in season | Title | Directed by | Written by | Original release date |
|---|---|---|---|---|---|
Part 1
| 21 | 1 | "The White Guy" | Wayne Rose | Matthew Parkhill | June 24, 2015 |
Grace is still missing. Ethan heads to Chicago to investigate notorious attorney Marty Stein. DEA Agent Harper Deakins' investigation into one of Chicago's deadliest gangs takes a turn when a routine stakeout goes wrong.
| 22 | 2 | "The Chandelier Man" | Wayne Rose | Michael S. Chernuchin | July 1, 2015 |
Grace works to escape. Ethan reconnects with his father. Escalating gang warfare spills into the suburbs. Ethan investigates Marty's leak at a party, where he meets Marlon Dinard, who is not what he seems.
| 23 | 3 | "Justice" | Clement Virgo | Lawrence Kaplow | July 8, 2015 |
Grace heads to Chicago to work with Ethan. Marlon appears on Harper's DEA radar. Harper's CI, Lobo, is made. Ethan finds Marty's leak.
| 24 | 4 | "Dirty Laundry" | Clement Virgo | Ira Parker | July 15, 2015 |
Lobo's death hits Harper hard. Ethan confesses to Marty why he's really in Chicago. Talia causes problems for Marlon. Grace and Ethan spy on Marty and the General, hoping for leverage. Grace follows a dangerous lead that results in her death (this was Thandie Newton’s final appearance).
| 25 | 5 | "The Fountain" | Paul Kaufman | Allison Intrieri | July 22, 2015 |
Talia is arrested, which causes a headache for Marty; Harper uncovers another clue in Hutchings' death; and Ethan searches for Grace and tries to rescue his father before it's too late.
| 26 | 6 | "Lights Out" | Martin Donovan | David Handelman | July 29, 2015 |
Ethan and George work on their relationship while hiding from Roberts; Marlon strives to regain control following Cups' death; Talia tries a fresh start; and Harper follows the money trail, which leads her to Marlon.
| 27 | 7 | "Mea Culpa" | Jeremiah Chechik | Jason Grote | August 5, 2015 |
Task force Det. Patrick Finnegan investigates who shot at Harper, while she tries to trap Marlon. When this fails, she tries to flip Talia. Ethan turns himself in, but has an exit strategy in play. Harper's relationship comes undone.
| 28 | 8 | "Oysters But No Pearls" | Jeremiah Chechik | Michael S. Chernuchin & Lawrence Kaplow | August 12, 2015 |
Ethan is stuck in prison. Roberts is arrested. Marty and the General have a sparring match over dinner. Harper leaves Jack and stays with Patrick, leading her to a few revelations. Marty makes a deal with Cynthia to hang it all on Roberts. Talia plans her next move after a fight with Marlon.
| 29 | 9 | "Chicagoland" | Larysa Kondracki | Matthew Parkhill & Ira Parker | August 19, 2015 |
Marlon's business is in jeopardy and Marty refuses to help. Harper questions Patrick. A free man, Ethan needs to decide what's next. Talia sets up Marlon. Marty learns of the sting and rushes to stop Marlon before it's too late.
| 30 | 10 | "Beyond Judgment" | Larysa Kondracki | Matthew Parkhill | August 26, 2015 |
Harper keeps Patrick contained. Marlon is arrested for Talia's murder, with Marty coming to his defense. Ethan strikes a new deal with Marty, who learns Marlon betrayed him. Harper breaks the Hutchings' murder case wide open.
Part 2
| 31 | 11 | "New Shooter" | Clement Virgo | Lawrence Kaplow & Michael S. Chernuchin | March 23, 2016 |
Ethan searches for a missing woman; Harper tries to turn Marlon; and Marty plots Marlon's prison release.
| 32 | 12 | "Hardboiled" | Clement Virgo | Ira Parker | March 30, 2016 |
Ethan searches for Mia; Harper contemplates going rogue; Marty tries to have the warrant for his DNA tossed; and Marlon seeks revenge against Marty.
| 33 | 13 | "Baggage" | Jeff Renfroe | Lawrence Kaplow & Michael S. Chernuchin | April 6, 2016 |
Ethan contemplates if he can trust Mia while dealing with an unexpected gunman. Marty does damage control after the audio tape of Talia's death is released. Harper tries to hide her involvement in leaking the tape.
| 34 | 14 | "Halfway Burnt" | Jeff Renfroe | Ira Parker & Matthew Parkhill | April 13, 2016 |
Ethan and Mia learn the identity of the assassin. Marlon considers starting over and forgoing illegal activity. Marty fights the court of public opinion regarding Talia's death. Harper harasses Marty's clients for dirt on him.
| 35 | 15 | "The Dime Tour" | Jeremiah Chechik | Allison Intrieri & Jason Grote | April 20, 2016 |
Ethan discovers that the Russian mob was hired to kill Mia; Patrick agrees to help Harper investigate Greg Barrett's murder; and Marlon tries to get his assets back.
| 36 | 16 | "Choking the Root" | Jeremiah Chechik | Lawrence Kaplow & Michael S. Chernuchin | April 27, 2016 |
Ethan questions why Marty wants Mia dead; Jen is kidnapped; Harper searches for Patrick, who's missing; and Marlon lies to Zipporah while continuing to help Ethan.
| 37 | 17 | "The Wheelbarrow" | Jason Stone | Ira Parker & Matthew Parkhill | May 4, 2016 |
Harper and Lowry interrogate Russian mobsters hoping to find Mia, but find clues about Patrick instead. Ethan and Jen conduct their own investigation into Mia's kidnapping. Marlon attempts to hide his bullet wound from Zipporah.
| 38 | 18 | "Close to Heaven" | Shaun Piller | Lawrence Kaplow & Michael S. Chernuchin | May 11, 2016 |
Ethan discovers Tilda's plan to kill him, but gets the upper hand, interrogates her, and learns the truth. Marty forces a captured Mia to use the flash drive. Harper deals with the aftermath of the task force being shot up.
| 39 | 19 | "How to Treat Us" | Robert Lieberman | Matthew Parkhill | May 18, 2016 |
Ethan, Marty, and Mia scramble to get enough money to keep the Russian mob off their back. Harper and Patrick's investigation leads them to Tilda's dead body and Marty. Marlon fights for his relationship with Zipporah.
| 40 | 20 | "A Piece of Wood" | Robert Lieberman | Matthew Parkhill | May 25, 2016 |
When Harper finds out Mia's true identity and her part in a computer hack of the National Security Agency, she tries to leverage this to make Mia turn on Marty. Ethan must decide if he trusts Mia and Marty while the three pull a $30 million heist together. As they complete the heist, Ethan betrays Mia to Patrick. Marlon turns back to his old gang lifestyle, ending up before newly appointed Federal Judge Marty.

=== Season 4 (2017) ===
| No. overall | No. in season | Title | Directed by | Written by | Original release date |
|---|---|---|---|---|---|
| 41 | 1 | "Maria, Full of Grace" | Jeremiah Chechik | Matthew Parkhill | March 22, 2017 |
Ethan returns to San Francisco hoping for a fresh start with his share from the heist. He buys an old bar and helps out platoon buddy Ray's wife and two young daughters. Ray's brother asks Ethan for help with his own troubled situation. Mia needs Marty's help to get her off a murder charge. Detective Clea Annou catches a businessman's murder and his killer's (Maria) subsequent murder, taking her down a rabbit hole associated with dirty cop Casey Oaks.
| 42 | 2 | "How the Light Gets In" | Jeremiah Chechik | Michael S. Chernuchin | March 29, 2017 |
Ethan has to navigate Oaks. Having escaped from federal custody, Mia's on the hunt for Ethan and her share of their Chicago heist, unaware that Patrick is on her trail. Clea investigates Maria's murder.
| 43 | 3 | "Lost Hope" | Jeff Renfroe | David Maples | April 5, 2017 |
Ethan tracks down Clea while getting dragged deeper into Oaks' crime world. Clea investigates Oaks' possible involvement in Maria's murder. Mia reconnects in a bar with Sadie, her former lover and accomplice from the computer hack of the National Security Agency. Patrick still struggles at coming to terms with Harper's death.
| 44 | 4 | "The Determined and the Desperate" | Jeff Renfroe | Robert Munic | April 12, 2017 |
Ethan scrambles to raise money to pay off the debt with Mia, who pressures him by targeting Ray's kids, convincing Sadie to help. Clea searches for the trafficked girls, and teams up with Ethan and Regan investigating Oaks. Patrick surveils Ethan in the hopes of catching Mia.
| 45 | 5 | "Pool Boy" | Jeremiah Chechik | Allison Intrieri | April 19, 2017 |
Ethan robs Oaks' associates and the consequences culminate in Theresa Archer, CEO of all Ombello's businesses (legal and illegal), ordering the death of Oaks' and three others at a warehouse – though only Oaks and two of the others are found. After Mia gets Sadie to injure Ray's daughter in a hit-and-run, the lovers argue over how far they'll go for money. Clea tries to protect Pham, one of the young trafficked girls she rescued. Patrick finally catches up with Ethan.
| 46 | 6 | "Elk" | Jeremiah Chechik | William Schmidt | April 26, 2017 |
To protect her trafficked girls/microchips business, Archer pressures Ethan to bug the phones and laptops of Clea and assistant district attorney Regan Faulkner. Searching for clues after the disappearance of Pham, Clea finds a microchip that had been implanted in the girl's brain. Ombello has retrieved their money from Ethan, so his only defence from Mia is for he and Patrick to investigate the hit-and-run—revealing Sadie to them. Ethan delays the payment to Mia, forcing her and Sadie to go on the run while they await the money.
| 47 | 7 | "Bifocals" | Michael DeCarlo | Michael S. Chernuchin | May 3, 2017 |
Clea figures out the identity of the missing man killed at the warehouse, a neurosurgeon associated with the microchip implanted in Pham's brain. Ethan helps Clea with her case but later drugs her and steals the microchip. Ethan and Patrick find Sadie. Ethan, Mia (with Sadie) and Marty join forces again to sell the microchip for $10 million. The sale is a setup, with Mia and Ethan killing the buyers, keeping the money and the microchip. Sadie betrays Mia, keeping all the money while allowing Patrick to get his final revenge for Harper.
| 48 | 8 | "Sunny Side Down" | Michael DeCarlo | Matthew Parkhill | May 10, 2017 |
Clea wakes up from the narcotics and after make amends with Ethan, work together with Regan to discover who's behind the conspiracy. Archer reveals herself as the leader of the conspiracy and hires Ethan as the new Casey Oaks. Clea follows a seemingly innocent bookseller and is kipnapped by him who is a contract killer from Ombello group. Ethan does Theresa's bidding; an explosion occurred in the Hoover building and in the television news blame Ethan.
| 49 | 9 | "The Third Man" | Robert Lieberman | Matthew Parkhill | May 17, 2017 |
After going out in the news and being the main suspect on the bombing of the Federal Building, Ethan goes into hiding. Laurie Gage, the bookseller holds Clea captive and torture her, after a fight Clea kills Gage. Theresa scrambles to tie up loose ends in her hunt for Ethan. Regan agrees to assist Ethan and Clea, and when she was about to give information to Clea, she was murdered.
| 50 | 10 | "A Good Leaving Alone" | Robert Lieberman | Matthew Parknill | May 25, 2017 |
After discovering what happened to Regan, Ethan and Clea rescue Ben Olson, the accountant who works for the office for budget management in the federal building that was bombed. Ethan and Clea then send a message to Nicholas Brady, a government official and the real leader of Ombello group. Brady sends hit men to kill them, but they only find the evidence against the activities of Ombello, so Brady decides shut it down everything and clean house by eliminating the Ombello leadership, including Theresa Archer. Before Theresa can be assassinated, Ethan saves her, and with Clea and Olson they hide from the hit men in Theresa's panic room. Clea offers Theresa protective custody if she turns state evidence and she accepts the deal. Ethan records her testimony on his phone in the panic room. Clea phones her partner and a swat team rescues them. As the group is leaving the house, one of Brody`s agents tries to kill them; Ethan alerts Clea, who shoots the agent and causes crossfire in which Captain Sleader and Detective Bethany die. Brady is later arrested on charges of racketeering, while Ethan is exonerated of all charges relating to the bombing. Agent Butler is the new officer in charge and while he reviews a list of their west coast operations, a subordinate asks him what they should do about Ethan Kelly. The series ends with Ethan in his bar looking contemplative.

== Home media ==
| Season | Episodes | DVD release dates | | | |
| Season | Episodes | Region 1 | Region 2 | Region 4 | Discs |
