= Sight Unseen (TV series) =

2024 crime drama television series

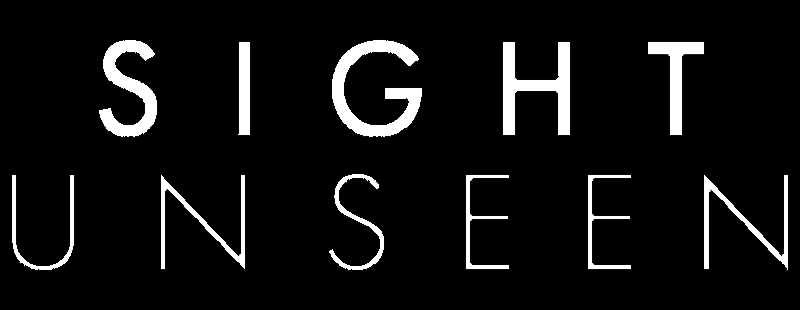
- Genre: Crime drama
- Created by: Karen Troubetzkoy; Nikolijne Troubetzkoy
- Starring: Dolly Lewis; Agam Darshi; Daniel Gillies
- Opening theme: "In the Shadows" by Amy Stroup
- Countries of origin: Canada; United States
- Original language: English
- No. of seasons: 2
- No. of episodes: 20

Production
- Executive producers: John Fawcett; Karen Troubetzkoy; John Morayniss; Carolyn Newman; Virginia Rankin; Charles Cooper; Derek Schreyer; Nikolijne Troubetzkoy
- Production companies: Blink49 Studios; Front Street Pictures; Sisters Troubetzkoy Productions; Bell Media

Original release
- Network: CTV (Canada); The CW (United States)
- Release: January 21, 2024 – March 24, 2025

Sight Unseen is a crime drama television series created by Karen Troubetzkoy and Nikolijne Troubetzkoy and co-produced by CTV in Canada and the CW in the United States. It premiered in Canada on January 21, 2024, and in the U.S. on April 3, 2024. The second season premiered on January 20, 2025. In February 2026, the series was confirmed to have been canceled after two seasons.

== Premise ==
Tess Avery is a former homicide detective in Vancouver, Canada, who, in the middle of a case, suddenly starts losing her vision. Within days, she is forced to leave her job after being diagnosed as clinically blind, due to the fast-onset genetic condition Leber's hereditary optic neuropathy (LOHN). Through the help of her visual guide Sunny, who works for a visual assistance app, she continues to help the police department solve crimes.

Tess tries to remain as independent as possible, while trying to navigate the world with her severe scotoma-type low vision as a consultant.

== Cast and characters ==
=== Main ===
- Dolly Lewis as Tess Avery, a former homicide detective living in Vancouver who is vision impaired and consulting for the police
- Agam Darshi as Sunny Patel / Sunita Sharma, an agoraphobic woman who lives 3,000 miles away in New York City
- Daniel Gillies as Jake Campbell, Tess' former homicide partner

=== Supporting ===
- Jarod Joseph as Matt Alleyne, Tess' childhood friend who is a tech-savvy professor
- Alice Christina-Corrigan as Mia Moss, a blind woman who helps Tess adjust to her low-vision situation
- Tony Giroux as Leo Li, a detective
- Roger Cross as Bennett, a police superintendent
- Alec Santos as Lucas Avery, Tess' brother
- Ennis Esmer as Kye, Sunny's doorman and love interest
- Tegan Moss as Rae

== Episodes ==
=== Series overview ===
Season	Episodes	Originally released	
Season	Episodes	First released	Last released
1	10	January 21, 2024	March 25, 2024
2	10	January 20, 2025	March 24, 2025

=== Season 1 (2024) ===
No. overall	No. in season	Title	Directed by	Written by	Canadian air date	U.S. air date	U.S. viewers (millions)	Rating/share (18–49)
1	1	"Tess"	John Fawcett	Karen Troubetzkoy & Nikolijne Troubetzkoy	January 21, 2024	April 3, 2024	0.34	0.05/1
2	2	"Sunny"	Jem Garrard	Nikolijne Troubetzkoy	January 29, 2024	April 10, 2024	0.36	0.03/0
3	3	"Jake"	John Fawcett	Russ Cochrane	February 5, 2024	April 17, 2024	0.33	0.05/1
4	4	"Mia"	Jem Garrard	Lisa Codrington	February 12, 2024	April 24, 2024	0.35	0.05/1
5	5	"Matt"	Sharon Lewis	Derek Schreyer	February 19, 2024	May 1, 2024	0.37	0.04/0
6	6	"Lucas"	Sharon Lewis	Chris Roberts	February 26, 2024	May 8, 2024	0.28	0.03/0
7	7	"Leo"	John Fawcett	Damon Vignale	March 4, 2024	May 15, 2024	0.27	0.02/0
8	8	"Fluffed"	John Fawcett	Lynne Kamm	March 11, 2024	May 22, 2024	0.28	0.03/0
9	9	"Burn Notice"	Bruce McDonald	Derek Schreyer	March 18, 2024	May 29, 2024	0.35	0.03/0
10	10	"Razor's Edge"	Bruce McDonald	Karen Troubetzkoy	March 25, 2024	June 5, 2024	0.34	0.03/0

=== Season 2 (2025) ===
No. overall	No. in season	Title	Directed by	Written by	Canadian air date	U.S. air date	U.S. viewers (millions)	Rating/share (18–49)
11	1	"Runaway Bride"	Unknown	Unknown	January 20, 2025	TBA	N/A	TBA
12	2	"About a Boy"	Unknown	Unknown	January 27, 2025	TBA	N/A	TBA
13	3	"Chain Reaction"	Unknown	Unknown	February 3, 2025	TBA	N/A	TBA
14	4	"Murder on the Dance Floor"	Unknown	Unknown	February 10, 2025	TBA	N/A	TBA
15	5	"Girls Like Us"	Unknown	Unknown	February 17, 2025	TBA	N/A	TBA
16	6	"Lost in Translation"	Unknown	Unknown	February 24, 2025	TBA	N/A	TBA
17	7	"Papa Don't Preach"	Unknown	Unknown	March 3, 2025	TBA	N/A	TBA
18	8	"Don't Look Back"	Unknown	Unknown	March 10, 2025	TBA	N/A	TBA
19	9	"Strangers in a Game"	Unknown	Unknown	March 17, 2025	TBA	N/A	TBA
20	10	"Rekindling"	Unknown	Unknown	March 24, 2025	TBA	N/A	TBA

== Development ==
Lewis herself has severe night blindness, and her retinas are detaching. She said that the producers of the show had been aware of this, and "I think they were looking to specifically cast somebody that has real life experience with" vision issues.

== Release ==
The series was ordered to series by both CTV and the CW and premiered on January 21, 2024, on CTV, as a special event following that day's NFL Divisional Playoff game.

The show's focus on a visually impaired woman received some attention as a significant advance for media representation of people with disabilities, as it premiered around the same time as One More Time, a Canadian comedy series on CBC Television about a hearing-impaired retail manager.

On June 6, 2024, CTV reported that the show had been renewed for a second season. The second season premiered on January 20, 2025, in Canada.

== Reception ==
=== Ratings ===
Viewership and ratings per episode of Sight Unseen
No.	Title	Air date	Rating (18–49)	Viewers (millions)	DVR (18–49)	DVR viewers (millions)	Total (18–49)	Total viewers (millions)
1	"Tess"	April 3, 2024	0.1	0.34	0.1	0.22	0.2	0.58
2	"Sunny"	April 10, 2024	0.0	0.36	0.0	0.16	0.0	0.51
3	"Jake"	April 17, 2024	0.1	0.33	TBD	TBD	TBD	TBD
4	"Mia"	April 24, 2024	0.1	0.35	TBD	TBD	TBD	TBD
5	"Matt"	May 1, 2024	0.0	0.37	TBD	TBD	TBD	TBD
6	"Lucas"	May 8, 2024	0.0	0.28	TBD	TBD	TBD	TBD
7	"Leo"	May 15, 2024	0.0	0.27	TBD	TBD	TBD	TBD
8	"Fluffed"	May 22, 2024	0.0	0.28	TBD	TBD	TBD	TBD
9	"Burn Notice"	May 29, 2024	0.0	0.35	TBD	TBD	TBD	TBD
10	"Razor's Edge"	June 5, 2024	0.0	0.34	TBD	TBD	TBD	TBD
