= Aisha Tyler =

American actress and talk show host

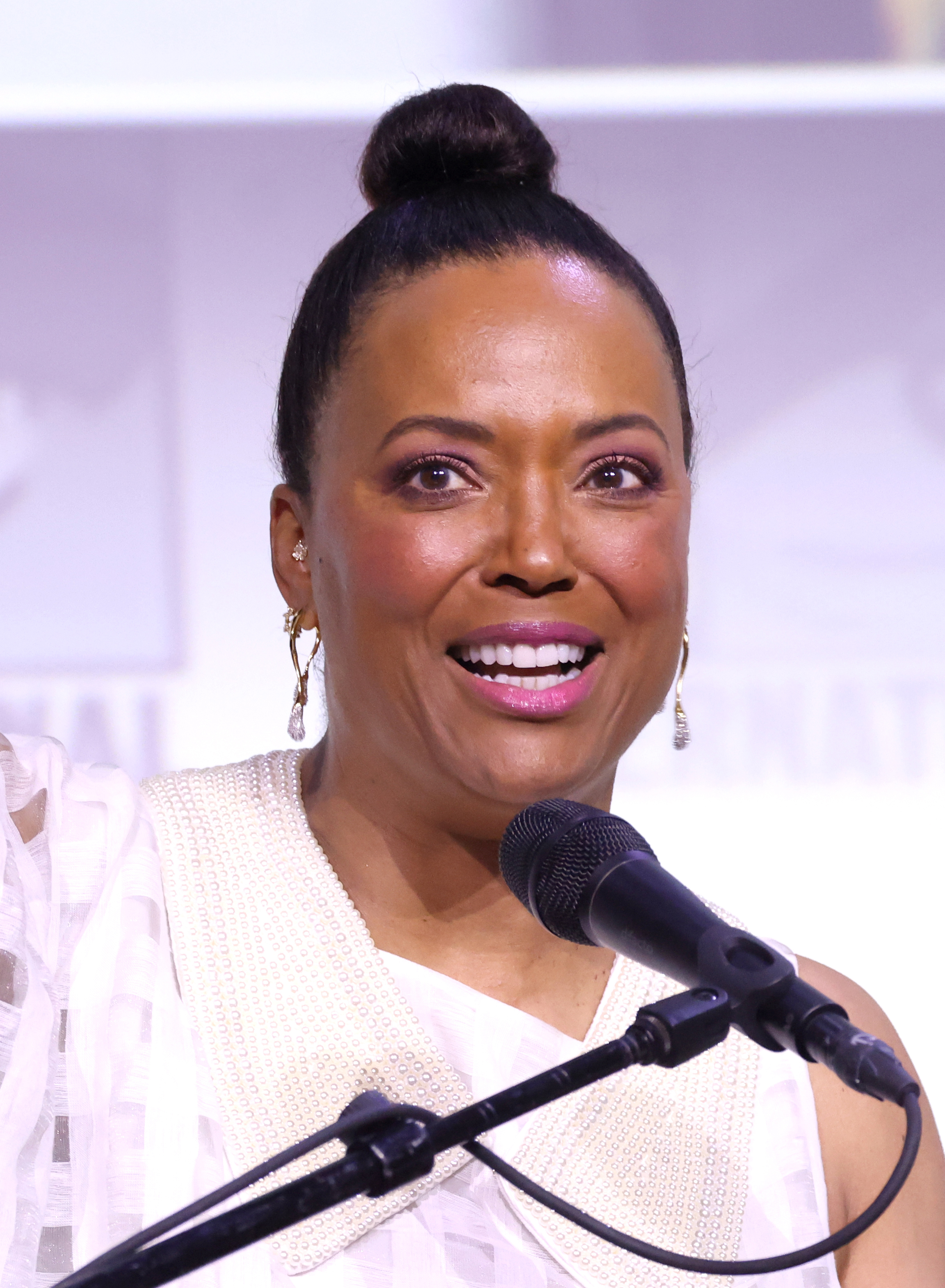
- Tyler in 2025
- Born: September 18, 1970 (age 56); San Francisco, California, U.S.
- Education: Dartmouth College
- Occupations: Actress, talk show host, director
- Years active: 1996–present
- Spouse: Jeff Tietjens (m. 1992; div. 2017)

Aisha Tyler (born September 18, 1970) is an American actress, talk show host and director. She is known for playing Andrea Marino in the first season of Ghost Whisperer, Dr. Tara Lewis in Criminal Minds since 2015, Mother Nature in the final two The Santa Clause films, and voicing Lana Kane in Archer. She also had recurring roles on CSI: Crime Scene Investigation, Talk Soup, and Friends.

She co-hosted seasons two through seven of CBS's The Talk, for which she won a Daytime Emmy Award for Outstanding Entertainment Talk Show Host. She has hosted Whose Line Is It Anyway? since 2013. She also hosted Ubisoft's E3 press conferences and has lent her voice to the video games Halo: Reach, Gears of War 3, and Watch Dogs.

== Early life ==
Tyler was born on September 18, 1970, in San Francisco, California, the daughter of Robin Gregory, a teacher, and James Tyler, a photographer. The family spent one year in Ethiopia and later spent time living in an ashram in Oakland, California. Her parents separated when she was ten years old, after which her father raised her. Her maternal great-grandfather was Thomas Montgomery Gregory, a dramatist and educator, and her great-great-grandfather was Howard University professor James Monroe Gregory. She explained on The Howard Stern Show that she was raised in a black neighborhood but went to a predominantly white private school which led to being teased by kids in her neighborhood with names like 'whitey'.

She pursued an early interest in comedy at McAteer High School in San Francisco, which had a special program called School of the Arts, now named Ruth Asawa San Francisco School of the Arts. Tyler attended high school with Sam Rockwell and Margaret Cho. She had a crush on Rockwell and followed him into acting class one day, leading to her interest in improv and sketch.

Tyler graduated from Dartmouth College in 1992. She was a member of The Tabard, a co-ed fraternity. At Dartmouth, she co-founded and sang in the Dartmouth Rockapellas, an all-female a cappella group devoted to spreading social awareness through song.

After briefly working for a San Francisco advertising firm, she toured the country pursuing a comedy career then moved to Los Angeles in 1996.

== Career ==
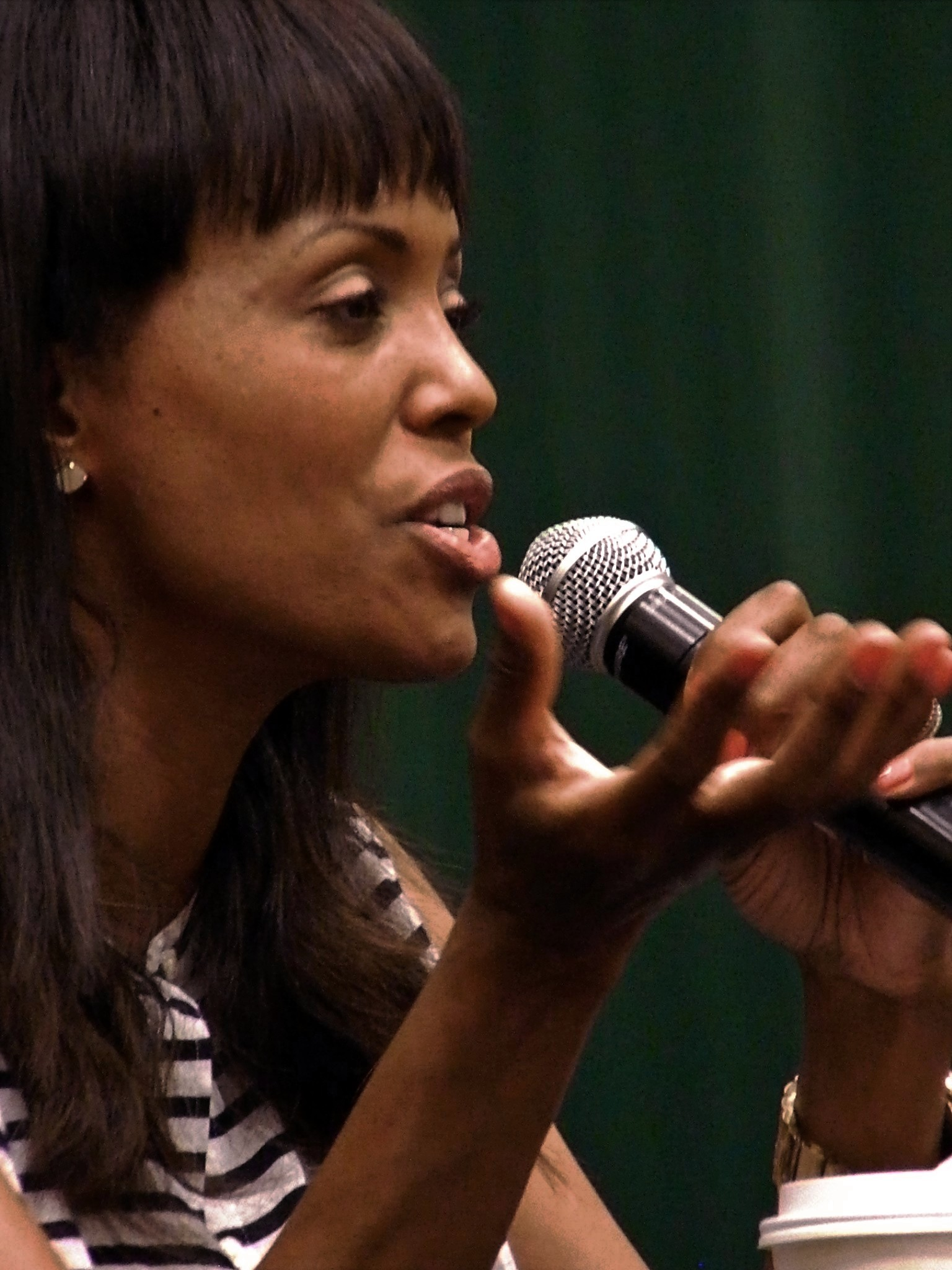
Tyler signing at a Barnes & Noble bookstore in New York

Tyler's career in television took off in 2001 with jobs as the host of Talk Soup and the reality-dating series The 5th Wheel, although Talk Soup was canceled the following year and Tyler left The 5th Wheel in 2002 to pursue other interests. Tyler has devoted a significant amount of her time to independent projects, including a role in the play Moose Mating, for which she received an NAACP Image Award. She also wrote, directed, and starred in the independent short film The Whipper. Moving into acting, Tyler featured in Friends as Dr. Charlie Wheeler where she was Joey's and then Ross's girlfriend in the ninth and tenth seasons. She followed this up with guest spots on CSI: Miami and Nip/Tuck, as well as balancing season-long recurring roles on both CSI: Crime Scene Investigation and 24 during the 2004–2005 television season. She also filmed her own talk show pilot for ABC and a sitcom pilot for CBS, neither of which was picked up. She has guest-starred on MADtv.

Following her regular role on the CBS series Ghost Whisperer during its first season, Tyler appeared in several films, including The Santa Clause 2, The Santa Clause 3: The Escape Clause, .45, the comedy Balls of Fury and the Lifetime drama film For One Night alongside Raven-Symoné. In 2007, she filmed the thriller Death Sentence and the crime drama Black Water Transit. She also continues to appear on television, with appearances on Boston Legal, Reno 911!, The Boondocks, and as a guest film critic on several episodes of At the Movies with Ebert & Roeper, filling in for the absent Roger Ebert while he recuperated from surgery.

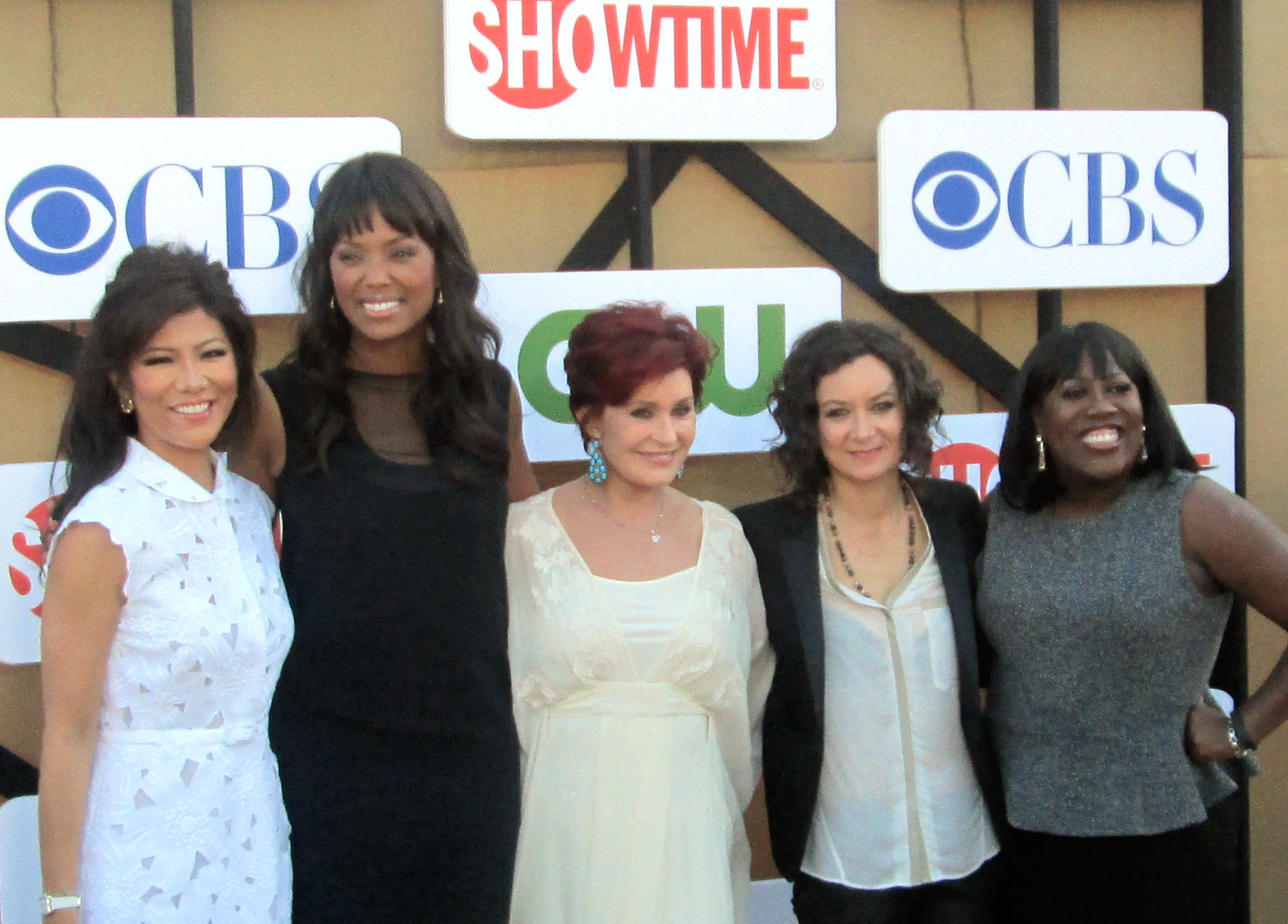
The Talk co-hosts Julie Chen Moonves, Aisha Tyler, Sharon Osbourne, Sara Gilbert, and Sheryl Underwood in 2012

Tyler has moved into print media as a regular contributor to Glamour, Jane, and Entertainment Weekly magazines. Her first book, Swerve: A Guide to the Sweet Life for Postmodern Girls, was released in January 2004. Tyler plays on the World Poker Tour in the Hollywood Home games for the Futures Without Violence charity. She also made a guest appearance on Kanye West's single "Slow Jamz", which featured Twista and Jamie Foxx. Philanthropy and charity work are very important to Tyler, and she regularly does volunteer work for the American Red Cross, The Trust for Public Land, Planned Parenthood Federation of America, and the International Rescue Committee.

Tyler appeared in a nude pictorial, along with other celebrities, in the May 2006 issue of Allure. The annual Nude Issue raises money to combat skin cancer.

In May 2009, it was announced that ABC had given Tyler her own talk show pilot, The Aisha Tyler Show. In early May 2010, she presented the "Welcome to the Beta" video for Halo: Reach. She also voiced a minor character in the game.

In 2009, she began her starring role voicing Lana Kane in the FX series Archer, which premiered on January 14, 2010 and ran for a total of 14 seasons, ending in 2023. In August 2010, Tyler began appearing in a recurring guest spot on The Stephanie Miller Show. The segment is named "Tuesdays With Tyler". Tyler appears either in-studio or via phone when she is not otherwise committed to one of her acting roles. While Hal Sparks was out of the country, Tyler filled in as the third member of the Stephanie Miller Sexy Liberal Comedy Tour on three shows in August 2011.

Also in 2009, Tyler performed her stand-up comedy routine live at the Fillmore Theatre.

On July 26, 2011, Tyler premiered her own weekly podcast, Girl on Guy, where she interviews her favorite celebrity friends and discusses topics guys love. The show launched as the No. 4 comedy podcast on iTunes. The first weekly installment of Girl on Guy featured guest H. Jon Benjamin (her costar on Archer); the second featured the host of Current TV's former show InfoMania, Brett Erlich, on August 1, 2011; and the third featured Archer creator Adam Reed on August 9, 2011. She hosted the show until 2017.

In October 2011, it was announced that Tyler would join the cast of The Talk as a permanent co-host, replacing Holly Robinson Peete. Her first full week as a co-host was from October 24 through October 28, 2011. Tyler is known for being expressive and outspoken on The Talk, especially about African American culture and stereotypes, LGBT rights, and women's rights. Tyler presented Ubisoft's press conference at E3 2012 in June, which received some backlash from fans who didn't believe Tyler was a gamer. This caused Tyler to respond with a poem about how she has been playing video games "since you were a twinge in the left side of your daddy's underoos." She returned to host the publisher's press conference the following year. Tyler's second book, Self-Inflicted Wounds: Heartwarming Tales of Epic Humiliation, debuted in July 2013, later becoming a New York Times bestseller; it was inspired by questions asked of guests on Girl on Guy.

In March 2013, Tyler was confirmed to be the new host of the American version of Whose Line Is It Anyway?. She also appears briefly as herself in the video game Watch Dogs and is featured in the music video for the "Weird Al" Yankovic song "Tacky". Tyler was also the original voice for the character Daisy Fitzroy in the 2013 video game BioShock Infinite, but her recordings were not used and the role went to Kimberly Brooks. She was nominated for Personality of 2014 in Golden Joystick Award 2014.

In June 2015, it was announced that Tyler landed a recurring role on the eleventh season of Criminal Minds as Dr. Tara Lewis. Although she served as a temporary replacement for Jennifer Love Hewitt, who was on maternity leave, her status was elevated to a main cast member in season 12.

In 2016, Tyler started a Kickstarter campaign to fund her directorial feature film debut, Axis. The film was shot over seven days in May 2016. Axis premiered at the 2017 Sarasota Film Festival and was an official selection at seven other major US festivals, winning Outstanding Achievement at the Newport Beach Film Festival. Axis was released via video-on-demand on April 10, 2018.

On the June 15, 2017, episode of The Talk, Tyler announced that she would be leaving the show at the end of the seventh season due to her busy schedule with three other television shows and directing films. She said she would return as a guest host and promote her various projects.

In 2023, she co-starred in the hit Apple TV+ limited series The Last Thing He Told Me, opposite Jennifer Garner.

== Personal life ==
Tyler married attorney Jeff Tietjens in 1992 or 1994 (sources differ). The pair separated in January 2015 and Tietjens filed for divorce in April 2016. The divorce was finalized in May 2017.

== Filmography ==
=== Film ===
Year	Title	Role	Notes
2000	Dancing in September	Woman with Weave	
2001	Moose Mating	Josie	
2002	The Santa Clause 2	Mother Nature	Cameo
2003	One Flight Stand	Alexis	
2004	Never Die Alone	Nancy	
2006	The Santa Clause 3: The Escape Clause	Mother Nature	
2006	.45	Liz	
2007	Death Sentence	Detective Wallis	
2007	Balls of Fury	Mahogany	
2007	The Trap!	Angela	
2008	Meet Market	Jane	
2008	Bedtime Stories	Donna Hynde	
2009	Black Water Transit	Casey Spandau	
2010	The Babymakers	Karen	
2017	Axis	Louise (voice)	Also director and producer Newport Beach Film Festival for Feature Film; Newport Beach Film Festival for Outstanding Achievement in Filmmaking – Feature; Nominated – Nashville Film Festival for New Directors Competition; Nominated – Portland Film Festival for Best Feature Film; Nominated – Sarasota Film Festival for Best Film
2020	Bad Therapy	Roxy	
2020	Friendsgiving	Lauren	
2021	Untitled Horror Movie	Bobbie Brower	

=== Television ===
Year	Title	Role	Notes
1996	Nash Bridges	Reporter	Episode: "High Impact"
1996	Grand Avenue	Girl #1	Television film
1999	The Pretender	Angela Somerset	Episode: "PTB"
2001	Curb Your Enthusiasm	Shaq's Girlfriend	Episode: "Shaq"
2001	The Weakest Link	Herself	Episode: "Comedians Special"
2001	Talk Soup	Herself (host)	19 episodes
2001	Off Limits	Cast	
2001-02	The 5th Wheel	Herself (host)	5 episodes
2002	The Sausage Factory	Jamie	Episode: "Purity"
2003	Friends	Dr. Charlie Wheeler	9 episodes Nominated – Teen Choice Award for Choice TV Breakout Star, Female
2003	CSI: Miami	Janet Medrano	Episode: "Body Count"
2004	My Life, Inc.	Melanie Haywood	Television film
2004	MadTV	Bride of Frankenstein	Episode: "9.14"
2004	Nip/Tuck	Manya Mabika	Episode: "Manya Mabika"
2004-05	CSI: Crime Scene Investigation	Mia Dickerson	13 episodes
2005	24	Marianne Taylor	7 episodes Nominated – NAACP Image Award for Outstanding Supporting Actress in a Drama Series (2006)
2005-06	Ghost Whisperer	Andrea Marino	23 episodes
2006	For One Night	Desiree Howard	Television film Nominated – NAACP Image Award for Outstanding Actress in a Television Movie, Miniseries or Dramatic Special
2007	Boston Legal	A.D.A. Taryn Campbell	Episode: "Trial of the Century"
2007	The Boondocks	Luna (voice)	Episode: "Attack of the Killer Kung-Fu Wolf Bitch"
2008	Million Dollar Password	Herself	Contestant
2008	Reno 911!	Befany Dangle	Episode: "Befany's Secret Family"
2009	Aisha Tyler Is Lit: Live at the Fillmore	Herself	Stand-up special
2009-23	Archer	Lana Kane (voice)	145 episodes Nominated – Behind the Voice Actors Awards for Outstanding Vocal Ensemble in a Television Series, Comedy/Musical (2013, 2014); Nominated – NAACP Image Award for Outstanding Actress in a Comedy Series (2014); Nominated – NAACP Image Award for Outstanding Character Voice-Over Performance (Television or Theatrical) (2016); Nominated – Online Film & Television Association Award for Best Voice-Over Performance in an Animated Program (2017)
2010	Chelsea Lately	Herself	1 episode
2010	The Forgotten	Lydia Townsend	Episode: "Designer Jane"
2011-12	XIII: The Series	Major Jones	15 episodes
2011	RuPaul's Drag Race	Herself	Season 3, Episode 6: "The Snatch Game"
2011-17	The Talk	Herself (co-host)	Won – Daytime Emmy Award for Outstanding Entertainment Talk Show Host (2017); Nominated – Daytime Emmy Award for Outstanding Talk Show Host (2014); Nominated – Daytime Emmy Award for Outstanding Entertainment Talk Show Host (2015, 2016, 2018)
2011-17	Talking Dead	Herself	4 episodes
2012	Glee	Jake Puckerman's Mother	Episode: "Glee, Actually"
2013-24	Whose Line Is It Anyway?	Herself (host)	Season 9–present
2013	Hawaii Five-0	Savannah Walker	Episode: "Imi Loko Ka 'Uhane"
2013	The Getaway	Herself	Episode: "Aisha Tyler in Paris"
2014	Modern Family	Wendy	Episode: "Spring-a-Ding-Fling"
2014	The Mind of a Chef	Herself	
2014	Two and a Half Men	Allison	Episode: "The Ol' Mexican Spinach"
2014	Hell's Kitchen	Herself	Episode: "Winner Chosen"
2014-15	BoJack Horseman	Sextina Aquafina (voice)	2 episodes
2015–2020; 2022–present	Criminal Minds	Dr. Tara Lewis	121 episodes Recurring role (season 11); Main cast (season 12–present)
2016	Lip Sync Battle	Herself	Episode: "Shaquille O'Neal vs. Aisha Tyler"
2016	Supergirl	Herself	Episode: "Falling"
2016-17	@midnight	Herself	2 episodes
2018	Unapologetic with Aisha Tyler	Herself (host)	9 episodes
2020	Diary of a Future President	Alicia	Episode: "Hello World"
2021-present	Monsters at Work	Millie Tuskmon (voice)	Recurring role
2021	RuPaul's Drag Race All Stars	Herself (guest judge)	Season 6, Episode 5: "Pink Table Talk"
2021	Robot Chicken	Angela Abar, Carole Baskin (voice)	Episode: "May Cause Random Wolf Attacks"
2021	Fear the Walking Dead	Mickey	Episode: "Till Death"; Nominated – Saturn Award for Best Guest-Starring Performance in a Network or Cable Television Series (2022)
2022	The Boys Presents: Diabolical	Nubia (voice)	Episode: "Nubian vs Nubian"; also writer
2022	The Boys	Herself	Episode: "Herogasm"; cameo
2022	Celebrity Jeopardy!	Herself	
2023	The Last Thing He Told Me	Jules	Miniseries
2025-present	Harley Quinn	Lena Luthor (voice)	

=== Video games ===
Year	Title	Role	Notes
2010	Halo: Reach	Female Trooper #2	
2011	Gears of War 3	Walker	RAAM's Shadow DLC
2014	Watch Dogs	Herself	Also likeness

=== Web ===
Year	Title	Role
2011-2016	Girl on Guy – Podcast	Host
2012	E3 – Electronics Entertainment Expo	Ubisoft Press Conference Host
2013	E3 – Electronics Entertainment Expo	Ubisoft Press Conference Host
2014	E3 – Electronics Entertainment Expo	Ubisoft Press Conference Host
2014	The GameOverGreggy Show	Guest
2015	Table Top: Cards Against Humanity	Guest
2015	E3 – Electronics Entertainment Expo	Ubisoft Press Conference Host
2016	E3 – Electronics Entertainment Expo	Ubisoft Press Conference Host
2020	Prime Rewind: Inside the Boys	Aftershow Host

=== Music videos ===
Year	Title	Artist	Notes
2003	"Slow Jamz"	Twista featuring Kanye West and Jamie Foxx	
2009	"Nowassitall"	Herself	From her DVD Aisha Tyler Is Lit
2013	"Simmer"	Silversun Pickups	Also director and editor
2013	"Crucial Velocity"	Clutch	Also director
2014	"Tacky"	"Weird Al" Yankovic	
2016	"Gone Cold"	Clutch	

=== Director ===
Year	Title	Notes
2010	Committed	Short; Also writer, editor and producer
2015	Ar Scath Le Chelie	Short
2017	Axis	Also producer
2017–2025	Criminal Minds	5 episodes
2019	Hipsterverse	2 episodes
2020	Roswell, New Mexico	Episode: "The Diner"
2021	Fear the Walking Dead	Episode: "J.D."
2021	The Walking Dead: World Beyond	2 episodes
2022	Evil	Episode: "The Demon of Parenthood"
2022	The Wonder Years	Episode: "Jobs and Hangouts"
2022	The Walking Dead	Episode: "What's Been Lost"

== Awards and nominations ==
Year	Award	Category	Project	Result	Ref.
2003	Teen Choice Award for Choice	TV Breakout Star, Female	Friends	Nominated	
2006	NAACP Image Award	Outstanding Supporting Actress in a Drama Series	24	Nominated	
2007	NAACP Image Award	Outstanding Actress in a Television Movie, Miniseries or Dramatic Special	For One Night	Nominated	
2013	Behind the Voice Actors Awards	Outstanding Vocal Ensemble in a Television Series, Comedy/Musical	Archer	Nominated	
2014	Behind the Voice Actors Awards	Outstanding Vocal Ensemble in a Television Series, Comedy/Musical	Archer	Nominated	
2014	Daytime Emmy Award	Outstanding Talk Show Host	The Talk	Nominated	
2014	NAACP Image Award	Outstanding Actress in a Comedy Series	Archer	Nominated	
2015	Daytime Emmy Award	Outstanding Entertainment Talk Show Host	The Talk	Nominated	
2016	Daytime Emmy Award	Outstanding Entertainment Talk Show Host	The Talk	Nominated	
2016	NAACP Image Award	Outstanding Actress in a Comedy Series	Archer	Nominated	
2017	Online Film & Television Association Award	Best Voice-Over Performance in an Animated Program	Archer	Nominated	
2017	Daytime Emmy Award	Outstanding Entertainment Talk Show Host	The Talk	Nominated	
2017	Newport Beach Film Festival	Feature Film	Axis	Won	
2017	Newport Beach Film Festival	Outstanding Achievement in Filmmaking – Feature	Axis	Won	
2017	Nashville Film Festival	New Directors Competition	Axis	Nominated	
2017	Portland Film Festival	Best Feature Film	Axis	Nominated	
2017	Sarasota Film Festival	Best Film	Axis	Nominated	
2018	Daytime Emmy Award	Outstanding Entertainment Talk Show Host	The Talk	Won	
2022	Saturn Award	Best Guest-Starring Performance in a Network or Cable Television Series	Fear the Walking Dead	Nominated	
2023	Black Reel Awards	Outstanding Supporting Performance in a TV Movie or Limited Series	The Last Thing He Told Me	Nominated	

== Published works ==
- Tyler, Aisha (2005). Swerve. Plume. ISBN 978-0452286320.
- Tyler, Aisha (2013). Self-Inflicted Wounds: Heartwarming Tales of Epic Humiliation. It Books. ISBN 978-0062223777.

Media offices
Preceded by Holly Robinson Peete	The Talk co-host 2011-2017	Succeeded by Eve
