= Emmett Hughes =

Irish actor, writer and producer (born 1987)

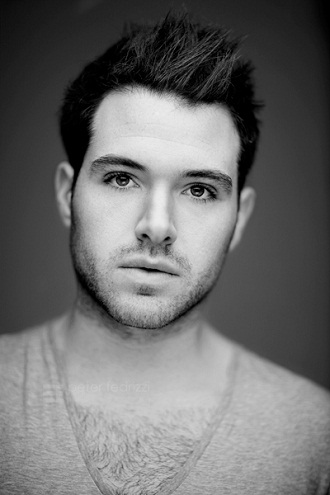
- Emmett Hughes, actor, writer and producer
- Born: 28 January 1987 (age 39); Headford, Galway, Ireland
- Citizenship: Ireland
- Occupations: Actor, writer, producer
- Years active: 2013–present

Emmett Hughes (born 28 January 1987 in Headford, Galway) is an Irish actor, writer and producer. He has worked in Dublin, London, Sydney and Los Angeles.

== Career ==
Emmett played the role of Gareth O'Brien in The O'Briens and as William Cullen in Ar Scáth le Chéile. He wrote, starred and produced both films. He wrote and starred in the 2017 independent thriller Axis, which marked Aisha Tyler's feature film directorial debut.

In 2023, he wrote and starred in the feature film Advent, which premiered at the 2023 Newport Beach Film Festival.

== Filmography ==
=== Films ===
Year	Title	Role	Notes
2013	The O'Briens	Gareth O'Brien	Feature Film; Writer; Producer
2014	Stuck	Glen	Short Film
2015	Ar Scáth le Chéile	William Cullen	Short Film; Writer; Producer
2015	Dying to Stay	Alex Joyce	Short Film
2017	Axis	Tristan Blake	Feature Film; Writer
2023	Advent	Samuel	Feature Film; Writer and lead actor

=== Television ===
Year	Title	Role
2015	Exiles: Vancouver	Emmett Hughes
2015	Hipsterverse	Movember Hipster
2021	Archer	William
