= Son Sook =

South Korean actress (born 1944)

- 손숙
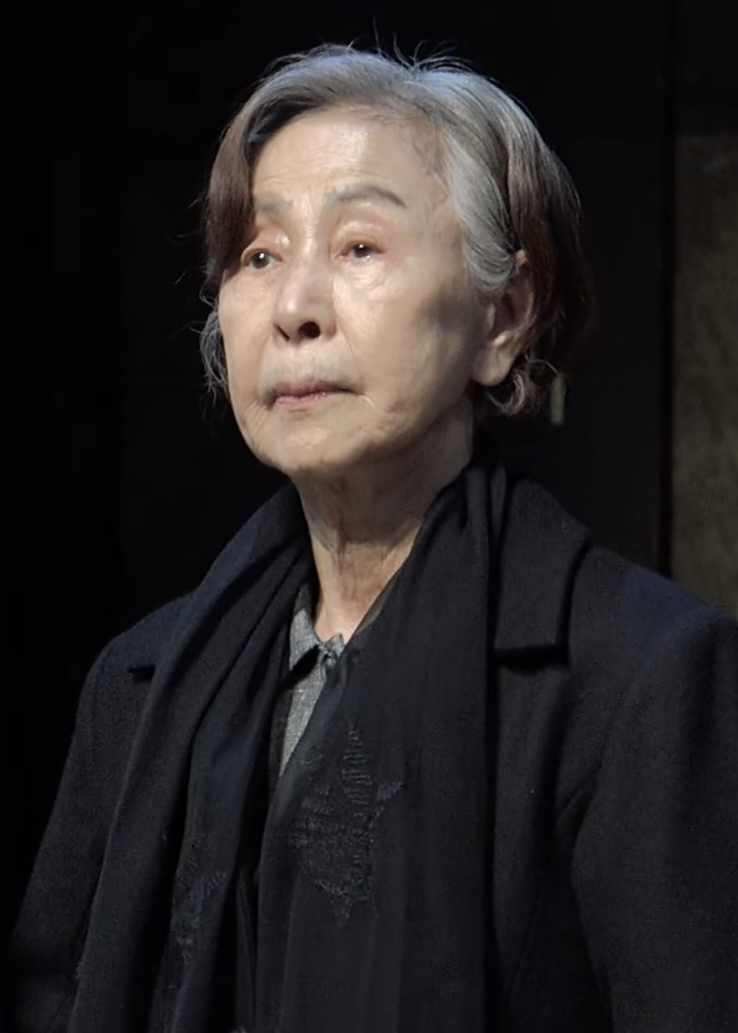
- Son in April 2025
- Born: May 13, 1944 (age 82); Miryang, South Gyeongsang Province, Korea
- Other name: Sohn Sook
- Education: Korea University Department of History (dropout)
- Occupation: Actress
- Years active: 1963–present
- Agent: Big Boss Entertainment
- Spouse: Kim Seong-ok (m. 1964; died 2022)
- Relatives: Yerin Ha (granddaughter)
- Honours: Eun-gwan Order of Cultural Merit (2012)

Korean name
- Hangul: 손숙
- Hanja: 孫淑
- RR: Son Suk
- MR: Son Suk

Son Sook (Korean: 손숙; born May 13, 1944) is a South Korean actress and former politician. In her first year at Korea University, she made her debut as the protagonist in the play Samgakmoja, commemorating the 60th anniversary of the school's founding. In 1969, she became a founding member of the theater group Sanwoollim, and in 1971, she joined the National Theater, working with renowned directors of the time such as Lee Hae-rang.

Starting with MBC's Women's Era in 1989, she has been hosting radio broadcasts for over 20 years. In 1999, she was the co-representative of the Environmental Movement Union and later became the Minister of Environment. In addition, she has been involved in volunteer activities in various social organizations, including as co-representative of "Beautiful Store" in 2002.

She has received the Baeksang Arts Award for Best Theater Actress three times for her performances in Volcano (1975), Guest (1979), and Mother (1999). She has also received awards such as the Korea Theater Festival Best Actress Award (1986), Lee Hae-rang Theater Award (1997), and the Eungwan Cultural Medal (2012). Her published works include Living Together, Crying and Laughing, People Son Sook Met, Women's Notebook, and The Island Village Boy, Former President Kim Dae-jung.

== Early life and education ==
Son was born in Dajuk-ri Jukseo Village, Sanoe-myeon, Miryang-gun (present-day Miryang-si, Gyeongsangnam-do), during the period of Japanese rule. Her primary education in Miryang was disrupted by the outbreak of the Korean War. Following the requisition of her school for use as a military hospital, students were displaced and forced to attend classes in various provisional locations. These makeshift educational settings included outdoor lessons by the riverside using pine trees as chalkboards and winter sessions held in borrowed storage facilities. During this period, students received milk powder and school supplies via American military transport. Despite the prevalence of cold, hunger, and the visible displacement of war refugees, Son later characterized her rural upbringing during the conflict as a formative experience.

Following a six-month period at Busan Girls' Middle School, Son relocated to Seoul with her mother and younger sibling, to pursue better educational opportunities. Son's mother had married at sixteen, though her husband had subsequently moved to Japan for his studies, leaving her to manage the household independently. Upon arriving in Seoul, the family settled in Donam-dong, where they initially faced difficulties adjusting to the urban environment and the social perception of their rural origins.

While attending Pungmoon Girls' High School, Son aspired to become a writer. She won several writing competitions and organized "Night of Literature" events with students from neighboring schools, including future prominent authors Hwang Seok-young and Jo Hae-il. Influenced by French poets such as Charles Baudelaire and Paul Valéry, she spent much of her time discussing poetry at a music hall in Jongno 2-ga and made multiple attempts to enter the annual "New Spring Literary" competition. During her final year of high school, Son experienced a life-changing performance of Eugene O'Neill's play Long Day's Journey Into Night at the Namsan Drama Center. Directed by Haehyang and featuring acclaimed actors Hwang Jung-soon, Jang Min-ho, and Yeo Woon-gye, the production deeply captivated her and altered her career trajectory toward the theater.

In May 1963, while majoring in history at Korea University, Son was cast in the lead female role of The Three-Cornered Hat by Spanish playwright Alarcón y Ariza. The production commemorated the 60th anniversary of the university. The male lead was portrayed by Kim Sung-ok, a senior member of the university drama club. Their professional collaboration developed into a romantic relationship, and they married two years later in 1965.

== Career ==
=== Career in Dongin Theater, Sanullim Theater and National Theater ===
In 1968, she joined the theater group Dongin Theater and started her career as a professional actress, taking on the role of Electra in Eugene O'Neill's play Mourning Becomes Electra. In the following year, She joined Sanullim Theater, which was founded in 1969. During her time in the troupe, She formed a lasting relationship with director Lim Young-woong, whom she regarded as a lifelong mentor. Two years later, she joined the National Theater Company and encountered director Haehyang Sunsaeng, which brought new vitality to her life. Reflecting on her theatrical journey, she said, "I dedicated my youth to Sanullim and the National Theater Company." She cited unforgettable productions such as Dress the Woman, Hong Dangmu, and Silence of the Sea from her years at Sanullim, as well as Faust, Love and Hate, and Look Homeward, Angel from her tenure at the National Theater Company. While she valued the opportunity to work with esteemed mentors and senior actors during her fifteen years at the National Theater, she also noted the artistic constraints within the troupe. Over time, she found herself increasingly at odds with the institutional atmosphere, leading to professional conflicts.

In 1989, during a challenging period in her life, Son was contacted by a producer and asked to read a letter for a potential role. Moved to tears by the writing, she accepted the position and became the host of the MBC radio show Women's Era with Son Sook and Kim Seung-hyun. The program addressed issues such as marital conflict, financial struggles, and personal hardship. Son's empathy and personal experiences resonated deeply with the audience, contributing significantly to the show's success.

Son Sook's Mother was first performed at the Jeongdong Theater in 1998. It was written and directed by Lee Yun-taek, and received a warm response from audiences. Inspired by the success, Jeongdong Theater director Hong Sa-jong, Lee Yun-taek, and Son Sook at the time promised to make Son Sook's Mother a regular repertoire at Jeongdong Theater for the next 20 years, but this did not materialize.

=== Back to theater ===
In November 1999, Son Sook appeared in the play That Woman, directed by Lim Young-woong, which premiered at the Sanullim Small Theater in Seoul at 3 pm on the 16th. That Woman is a one-person play that presents a new stage adaptation of Simone de Beauvoir's Woman in Desperate, portraying the despair of a woman who believes she has achieved success in life and love, only to discover her husband's infidelity. This was performed until January 23, 2000.

In the year 2000, Son Sook performed at the Towol Theater at the National Theater of Korea with the play Mother, running from December 7 to 31. This production, written by Lee Youn-taek, was its third staging, following earlier performances in 1996 and 1999. Son Sook's return to the role of Mother after her previous performance in Moscow, along with the controversy surrounding the termination of the play's 20-year contract with Jeongdong Theater, generated considerable buzz.

"Theater is a live art form where actors and the audience breathe together. It is an extraordinary experience when actors and the audience meet each other's gaze and share the same breath. Moreover, unlike screens or TV dramas, theater often provides healing for the audience. Despite the challenging environment in theater, I love it and transcend all of that for the love of theater."

In 2004, Son Sook's Mother was performed in COEX Art Hall.

In 2007, after 15 years, Son and Park Jeong-ja, who had previously worked together in 1992, reunited for the play Agnes of God. This play revolves around the character of Agnes, a young nun, and explores the intense psychological conflicts and confrontations between the senior nun and the psychiatrist. Since its South Korean debut in 1983, Agnes of God has enjoyed immense popularity, consistently selling out every performance.

== Other activities ==
On May 24, 1999, Son was appointed the 6th Minister of Environment, a position she held for less than a month. Following a performance at the Taganka National Theatre in Moscow, on May 30, she received $20,000 from the Federation of Korean Industries. While Son defended the payment as a traditional gesture of encouragement for theater professionals, the transaction drew immediate public scrutiny as regulations prohibited public officials from accepting gifts exceeding 50,000 won. Son clarified that the ministerial offer had arrived just one week before the Russian performance, which proceeded due to prior international commitments. She stated that the funds were presented on stage, received by the theater director, and used to cover penalty fees for canceled regional shows and crew compensation. Despite this explanation, the incident was characterized as a bribe in media and political spheres, leading Son to resign on June 25, 1999, while citing a profound sense of injustice.

Prior and after her brief ministerial position, Son has held several leadership roles in the arts and humanitarian sectors. In 1998, Son was a member of the Women's Special Committee and as a non-standing director of the Arts Council Korea. In March 2006, she was appointed a visiting professor in the Department of Theater and Film at Dankook University. In 2014, She was the chairperson of the Ethiopian Korean War Veterans Support Association. From April 2013 to May 2020, she was the director of the Mapo Cultural Foundation. From September 2018 to September 2021, she was director of the Arts Council.

== Philanthropy ==
In 2002, she became a co-representative of the Beautiful Store. Beautiful Store cleans donated used goods such as used clothes, used home appliances, and used books and sells them at low prices. It uses the proceeds to help the less fortunate. It was started with the opening of its first store in Anguk-dong, Jongno District, Seoul on October 18, 2002. In 2003, it sold recycled products provided by over 10,900 individual donors over the course of a year. A total of 55 million won was provided to 52 organizations.

Son and Kim Seung-hyun's Letter Show was attracting attention by having Radio Beautiful Shop that helps neighbors in need through auctions of stars' cherished items.

== Personal life and death ==
Son Sook married Kim Sung-ok in 1965 after meeting in their university drama club. Their relationship developed while they performed the lead roles in the play The Three-Cornered Hat. Kim later was the artistic director of the Mokpo Municipal Theater. The couple had three daughters. Among their descendants, only their granddaughter, Australian actress Yerin Ha, followed their career path into acting. In December 2022, Kim died at the age of 87. At the time she was the CEO of the theater company Shinhyup.

== Filmography ==
=== Film ===
Film appearances
Year	Title		Role	Note	Ref.
Year	English	Korean	Role	Note	Ref.
1990	Only Because You're a Woman	단지 그대가 여자라는 이유만으로	Female lawyer		
1995	Rehearsal	리허설	A	Cameo	
1995	Afternoon of a Bitchy Day	개같은 날의 오후	Kim Kyung-sook		
2005	Tale of Cinema	극장전	mother of the theatre mother	Cameo	
2006	Gift from Summer	여름이 준 선물		Cameo	
2011	Fighting Spirit	투혼	Noodle Restaurant Grandma	Cameo	
2012	Juri	주리	Woman	Cameo	
2014	Awaiting	민우씨 오는 날	Yeonhee		
2016	Spirits' Homecoming	귀향	Yeongok (Younghee)		
2016	Familyhood	굿바이 싱글	Drama Leading Middle-aged Actor		
2017	I Can Speak	아이 캔 스피크	Moon Jeong-shim	Cameo	
2018	Champion	챔피언	Mark's Mom	Cameo	
2020	Vocalist	소리꾼	Old woman	Cameo	
2021	Flower hand	꽃손	Okdan		
2022	When Spring Comes	봄날			

=== Television series ===
Television appearances
Year	Title		Role	Note	Ref.
Year	English	Korean	Role	Note	Ref.
1996	One of a Pair	짝	Park Wol-rye	Cameo	
2002	Hyunjung, I Love You	현정아 사랑해	Son Jeong-im		
2002	My Name is Princess	내 이름은 공주	Jeong Seon-hee		
2005	TV Literature Centre: "The House Where I Lived"	TV 문학관 - 내가 살았던 집	mother		
2007	It's Good Though	그래도 좋아	Kwon Eun-shim		
2015	Blood	블러드	Ansilvia		
2016	Blow Breeze	불어라 미풍아	Sunok		
2018	The Beauty Inside	뷰티 인사이드	Daily Hansegae		
2018	Room No. 9	나인룸	Kim Mal-bun		
2018	Suits	슈츠	Baejuja	Special appearance	
2018	My Mister	나의 아저씨	Lee Bong-ae: Lee Ji-an's deaf grandmother		
2019	Arthdal Chronicles	아스달 연대기	Asasakan	Special appearance	
2020	KBS Drama Special	KBS 드라마 스페셜	Geum Young-ran		
2020	Birthcare Center	산후조리원	Kim Nam-rye	Special appearance	
2020	When My Love Bloom	화양연화	Lee Kyung-ja	Special appearance	
2021	Idol: The Coup	아이돌: 더 쿠데타	Oh Hyun-ji's grandmother	supporting actor	
2022	May It Please the Court	변론을 시작하겠습니다	Noh Chung-hee's grandmother		
2022	Glitch	글리치	Baek Yoon-sun		
2022	The Glory	더 글로리	Grandmother (Pan-Geum)		
2023	The Glory 2	더 글로리	Grandmother (Pan-Geum)		

=== Radio programs ===
Year	Title	Role	Notes	Ref.
1990–1999	Women's Generation	Radio DJ	MBC 표준FM	
1999	Son Sook's Beautiful World	Radio DJ	SBS FM	
2005	Son Sook, Kim Beom-soo's Beautiful World	Radio DJ	SBS FM	
2005	Kim Seung-hyun, Son Sook's letter show	Radio DJ	SBS FM	
2008–2015	Son Sook, to the country of happiness of Han Dae-soo	Radio DJ	CBS 표준FM	
	Radio Novels (Take Care of Mom)	Radio DJ	EBS FM	
2016	EBS Reading Radio Reading Series	Radio DJ	EBS FM	

== Stage ==
=== Musical ===
Musical plays performances
Year	Title		Role	Theater	Date	Ref.
Year	English	Korean	Role	Theater	Date	Ref.
1994	Guys and Dolls	아가씨와 건달들		Opera Theater of the Seoul Arts Center	January 21 – February	

=== Theater performances (60s to 90s) ===
Theater plays performances
Year	Title		Role	Theater	Date	Ref.
Year	English	Korean	Role	Theater	Date	Ref.
1964	Mourning Becomes Electra	상복을 입은 엘레크라	Electra	—N/a		
1969	Dress the Girl	그 여자에게 옷을 입혀라	Han Seol-hee	National Theater Grand Theater	May 12–27	
1970	R.U.R. (Russum's Universal Robots)	인조인간	Moon Jeong-sook	Myeongdong Arts Theatre	Nov 11–15	
1971	Shilla Line	신라인		Myeongdong Arts Theatre	March 3–7	
1971	Moon House	달집	Won-shik's wife	Myeongdong Arts Theatre	Sep 14–19	
1972	Fantasy Travel	환상여행	Sun Woo-ryeong	Myeongdong Arts Theatre	Feb 1–7	
1972	Prisoners of War	포로들	gyeonghwa	Myeongdong Arts Theatre	May 16–22	
1972	The Colorful Funeral Bier	꽃상여	Daughter-in-law	Myeongdong Arts Theatre	Nov 4–6	
1972	Songhak-jung Pavilion	송학정	Yeong-ran	Myeongdong Arts Theatre	Dec 26–28	
1973	Admiral Yi Sun-sin	성웅 이순신	Sun-hwa	National Theater Grand Theater	October 17–28	
1974	The Active Volcano	활화산	Kim Jeong-sook	National Theater Grand Theater	February 26 – March 6	
1974	Admiral Yi Sun-sin	성웅 이순신	Sun-hwa	National Theater Grand Theater	April 27–28	
1975	Jingbirok	징비록	Lady Jang (Yu Seong-ryong's concubine)	National Theater Grand Theater	March 1–9	
1975	Wilhelm Tell	빌헬름 텔	Bertha	National Theater Grand Theater	November 27 – December 1	
1976	Peer Gynt	페르귄트	Anitra	National Theater Grand Theatre	September 24–28	
1976	A Graveyard Looking Northward	북향묘	Young-bi	National Theater Grand Theatre	November 25–29	
1977	Chorip-dong (Boy with a Straw Hat)	초립동	Princess Wolsan	National Theater Grand Theatre	March 2–6	
1977	Sontag Hotel	손탁호텔	Hyun-joo	National Theater Grand Theatre	June 10–13	
1977	Silence of the Sea	바다의 침묵	Catherine	Cecil Theater	May 6–13	
1977	Faust	파우스트	Gretchen	National Theater Grand Theatre	June 29 – July 3	
1977	Blush	홍당무	Hong Dang-mu	National Theater Grand Theatre	September 1–7	
1978	Forest of Massacre	학살의 숲	Lee Sook	National Theater Grand Theatre	November 24–28	
1978	Emile Bell	에밀레종	Jin-hee	National Theater Grand Theatre	March 1–5	
1978	Look Homeward, Angel: a Story of the buried life	천사여 고향을 보라	Laura	National Theater Small Theatre	April 19–28	
1978	Look Homeward, Angel: a Story of the buried life	천사여 고향을 보라	Laura	National Theater Small Theatre	June 30 – July 3	
1978	Splash	물보라	Nampodaeg	National Theater Small Theatre	September 15–24	
1978	Splash	물보라	Nampodaeg	National Theater Small Theatre	November 8–12	
1979	Guest House	객사	Byeok Soon	National Theater Grand Theatre	February 28 – March 4	
1979	Becket	베케트	Gwendron	National Theater Grand Theatre	June 26 – July 2	
1979	Adult at Puberty	사추기	Sook	National Theater Grand Theatre	December 12–18	
1980	Sansuyu	산수유	Aunt	National Theatre of Korea Grand Theatre	December 2–8	
1981	Splash	물보라	Nampodaeg	National Theatre of Korea Grand Theatre	March 9–16	
1981	King Sejong the Great	세종대왕	Park Sang-gung	National Theatre of Korea Grand Theatre	June 16–22	
1981	King Sejong the Great	세종대왕	Park Sang-gung	National Theatre of Korea Grand Theatre	October 6–9	
1982	Puss in Boots	고양이	Hintz	National Theatre of Korea Small Theatre	May 17–26	
1982	The Season of the North Wind	삭풍의 계절	Mister Woo	National Theatre of Korea Grand Theatre	Sep 30 – Oct 6	
1982	The Season of the North Wind	삭풍의 계절	Mister Woo	National Theatre of Korea Grand Theatre	Oct 23–26	
1983	Princess Paridogi	바리더기	A shaman, the person who leads the boat of paradise	National Theater Small Theatre	March 9 – April 1	
1983	The Third God	제3의 신	롱	National Theater Small Theatre	June 15 – July 8	
1983	Naraesom	나래섬	수례	National Theater Grand Theatre	Oct 16–19	
1983	A Public Woman	공녀 아실	Old woman	National Theater Small Theatre	Nov 17 – Dec 2	
1984	A Burning Stream	불타는 여울	Jeong Soo-mi	National Theater Grand Theater	May 10–13	
1984	A Burning Stream	불타는 여울	Jeong Soo-mi	National Theater Grand Theater	June 16–18	
1984	Faust	파우스트	Gretchen	National Theater Grand Theater	Oct 26–31	
1985	Shoo Shoo Once upon a Time	옛날 옛적에 훠어이 훠이	Wife	National Theater Small Theater	March 8–17	
1985	Tomorrow and Again Tomorrow	내일 그리고 또 내일	Hwa-sil	National Theater Grand Theater	Aug 17–23	
1985	Tomorrow and Again Tomorrow	내일 그리고 또 내일	Hwa-sil	National Theater Grand Theater	Dec 16–23	
1986	Life of Submission	인종자의 손	Eun-joo	National Theater Small Theater	March 7–13	
1986	Bi-ong Sa-ong	비옹사옹	Woman	National Theater Grand Theater	August 28–29	
1986	Bi-ong Sa-ong	비옹사옹	Woman	National Theater Grand Theater	September 23–27	
1986	Uncle Vanya	봐냐 아저씨	Sonya	National Theater Small Theater	Dec 13–22	
1987	Heaven in a Dream	꿈하늘	Park Ja-hye	National Theatre of Korea Small Theatre	March 18–27	
1987	Heaven in a Dream	꿈하늘	Park Ja-hye	National Theatre of Korea Small Theatre	May 1–15	
1987	The Wild Duck	들오리	Gina Exdal	National Theatre of Korea Small Theatre	June 21–25	
1987	Heaven in a Dream	꿈하늘	Park Ja-hye	National Theatre of Korea Small Theatre	August 25–28	
1987	The Wild Duck	들오리	Gina Exdal	National Theatre of Korea Small Theatre	October 4–11	
1987	Sea of Silence	침묵의 바다	Eumjeonne	National Theatre of Korea Small Theatre	December 17–22	
1988	Taming the Shrew	말괄량이 길들이기	Woman	Seoul National University	April 23	
1988	Thunderstorm	뇌우		National Theater Grand Theater	Oct 16–25	
1989	Thunderstorm	뇌우		National Theater Grand Theater	Jan 25	
1989	Splash	물보라	Nampodaeg	National Theater Small Theater	March 6–15	
1989	Peace Under Heaven	태평천하	Seoul lady	National Theater Grand Theater	Aug 25–27	
1989	Shoo Shoo Once upon a Time	옛날 옛적에 훠어이 훠이	Wife	National Theater Small Theater	Oct 13–18	
1989	Intrigue and Love	간교와 사랑	Luise Miller	National Theater Grand Theater	Nov 25–30	
1990	The Misunderstanding	오해	Malta	Culture and Arts Center Grand Theater	May 30 – June 5	
1990	The House of Bernarda Alba	베르나르다 알바의 집	Bernarda Alba	National Theater Small Theater	April 5–19	
1990	Intrigue and Love	간교와 사랑	Luise Miller	National Theater Grand Theater	Sep 21–25	
1990	King Oedipus	오이디프스 왕	Jocasta	National Theater Grand Theater	Dec 3–8	
1991	Seed of Soul	넋씨	Mother	National Theater Grand Theater	April 3–8	
1991	Revizor (The Inspector General)	검찰관	Blacksmith's Wife	National Theater Grand Theater	Nov 6–12	
1992	The Wedding Day	맹진사댁 경사	Nurse	National Theatre Grand Theater	Feb 10–15	
1992	Agnes of God	신의 아그네스	dr. Martha Louise Livingston	Small Theater Sanwoolim Seoul	April 4–19	
1992	Agnes of God	신의 아그네스	dr. Martha Louise Livingston	Small Theater Sanwoolim Seoul	June 1 – August 3 – October 12	
1992	Measure for Measure	법에는 법으로	Mistress Overdone	National Theatre Small Theater	Nov 12–25	
1993	Agnes of God	신의 아그네스	Dr. Martha Louise Livingston	Daegu Arts Center	Jan 30–31	
1993	Agnes of God	신의 아그네스	Dr. Martha Louise Livingston	Busan Citizens Center	February 6–7	
1993	Agnes of God	신의 아그네스	Dr. Martha Louise Livingston	Daejeon Woosong Arts Center	Feb 13–14	
1993	Agnes of God	신의 아그네스	Dr. Martha Louise Livingston	Jeju Arts Center on the	Feb 20–21	
1994	Shirley Valentine	셜리 발렌타인 - 그 여자의 자리	Shirley Valentine	Experimental theatre	June 21	
1995	King Lear	미친 리어왕		Seoul Art Center	August 11 – September 14	
1995	Woman in Crisis	위기의 여자	Woman	Small Theater Sanwoolim	Aug 17 – Sep 8	
1998	'night, Mother	연극열전2 여덟번째 작품: 잘자요, 엄마	Thelma "Mama" Cates	Small Theater Sanwoolim	May 19 – June 26	

=== Theater performances (2000s) ===
Theater plays performances
Year	Title		Role	Theater	Date	Ref.
Year	English	Korean	Role	Theater	Date	Ref.
1999	Son Sook's Mother	손숙의 어머니	Mother	Jeongdong National Theater	February	
1999	Son Sook's Mother	손숙의 어머니	Mother	Takanka Theater in Moscow	May 29–30	
1999–2000	That Woman	그여자	Woman	Small Theater Sanwoolim	Nov 17 – Jan 19	
2000	Son Sook's Mother	손숙의 어머니	Mother	Seoul CJ Towol Theater	December 8–31	
2003–2004	The Bridges of Madison County	매디슨 카운티의 추억	Francesca	Small Theater Sanwoolim	Dec 16 – Feb 1	
2004	Son Sook's Mother	손숙의 어머니	Il-soon	COEX Art Hall	Sep 10 – Oct 2	
2005	Shirley Valentine	셜리 발렌타인	Shirley Valentine	Woorim Cheongdam Theatre	Aug 13 – Sep 11	
2006	Love, Smile	사랑아 웃어라		COEX art hall	Feb 9 – Apr 9	
2007	Agnes of God	신의 아그네스	Dr. Martha Livingston	National Jeongdong Theatre Seoul	Jan 9 – Feb 7	
2007	Agnes of God	신의 아그네스	Dr. Martha Livingston	Seongnam Art Center	March 2–4	
2007	Woman in Crisis	위기의 여자	Woman			
2007	Road	길		Daehakro Arts Promotion Center Arts Theater	April 14–19	
2007	Agnes of God	신의 아그네	Dr. Martha Livingston	Seoul Arts Center Jayu Small Theater	Dec 8–30	
2008	Aloes Wood	침향	Aesook (Jangsu's wife)	Arko Arts Theatre Grand Theatre	June 11–29	
2008–2009	'night, Mother	연극열전2 여덟번째 작품: 잘자요, 엄마	Thelma Cates	Wonder Space Square Theater	Aug 29 – January 4	
2009	Son Sook's Mother	손숙의 어머니	Mother	Dongguk University Lee Hae-rang Theater	April 25	
2009	Long Day's Journey into Night	밤으로의 긴 여로	Mary	Myeongdong Arts Theatre	Sep 10 – Nov 11	
2009	Autumn Sonata	가을소나타	Mother	Daehakro Arts Theater	December 10	
2010	Wife's Outing	아내들의 외출	Lim Moon-kyung	Oriental Arts Theatre 1 (former. Art Centre K Nemo Theatre)	April 3–11	
2010	Please Look After Mom	엄마를 부탁해	Mom	National Museum of Korea theatre	Oct 30 – Dec 31	
2010	Driving Miss Daisy	드라이빙 미스 데이지		Myeongdong Arts Theater	August 20 – September 12	
2011	Please Look After Mom	엄마를 부탁해	Mom	Theater M of Sejong Center for the Performing Arts	January 28 – March 6	
2011	Please Look After Mom	엄마를 부탁해	Mom	Cheongju Arts Centre	January 15–16	
2011	Please Look After Mom	엄마를 부탁해	Mom	Grand Performance Hall of Incheon Culture and Arts Centre	January 22–23	
2011	Please Look After Mom	엄마를 부탁해	Mom	Korean Sori Culture Centre Moakdang Jeonju	February 19–20	
2011	Please Look After Mom	엄마를 부탁해	Mom	Gunpo Culture and Arts Centre Suri Hall (Daegong Hall)	March 19	
2011	Please Look After Mom	엄마를 부탁해	Mom	Changwon Seongsan Art Hall Grand Theatre	March 12	
2011	Please Look After Mom	엄마를 부탁해	Mom	Daejeon Arts Centre Art Hall	March 5–6	
2011	Please Look After Mom	엄마를 부탁해	Mom	Seoul Arts Center CJ Towol Theater My mother in the play.	March 25 – April 17	
2011	Wife's Outing	아내들의 외출	Lim Moon-kyung	COEX art hall	April 1–17	
2011	Please Look After Mom	엄마를 부탁해	Mom	Gwangju 5.18 Cultural Centre Democratic Hall	April 23	
2011	Please Look After Mom	엄마를 부탁해	Mom	Daegu Suseong Art Pia Paper Hall	May 5–8	
2011	Please Look After Mom	엄마를 부탁해	Mom	Busan Civic Center Grand Theater	May 7–8	
2011	Please Look After Mom	엄마를 부탁해	Mom	MBC Hall in Changwon, South Gyeongsang Province	May 14–15	
2011	Wife's Outing	아내들의 외출	Lim Moon-kyung	Goyang Aram Nuri Sarasae Theatre	June 3–12	
2011	Shirley Valentine	셜리 발렌타인	Shirley Valentine	Seoul Arts Centre Free Small Theatre	November 18 – December 4	
2012	Wife's Outing	아내들의 외출	Lim Moon-kyung	Chungmu Art Hall Small Theater Blue	March 23 – April 15	
2012	I Miss Your Parents' Faces	니 부모 얼굴이 보고 싶다	Lee Ye-rim's Grandma	Sejong Center for the Performing Arts M Theater	June 24 – July 29	
2012	My most favourite guinee	나의 가장 나종 지니인 것		Chungmu Art Centre Middle Theatre Black	Aug 24 – Sep 23	
2013	Son Sook's Mother	손숙의 어머니	Il-soon	Daehakro Arts Theater	February 1–17	
2013	My Ecstatic Disappearance	나의 황홀한 실종기손숙, 연기 50주년 기념	Yoon Geum-sook	Sanullim small Theater	Apr 12 – May 12	
2013	Son Sook's Mother	손숙의 어머니	Il-soon	Goyang Aram Nuri Sarasae Theater	May 23–26	
2013	Hello My Butterfly	안녕, 마이 버터플라이	Theater Actress	Seoul Arts Centre Free Small Theater	July 5–28	
2013	Son Sook's Mother	손숙의 어머니	Il-soon	Bupyeong Art Centre Haenuri Theatre	September 6–7	
2013	With Father, I and Hong-mae	아버지와 나와 홍매와	Mother	White Bul Bul-Art Centre White Hall	September 10 – October 6	
2013	Son Sook's Mother	손숙의 어머니	Mother	Hanam Culture and Arts Centre Grand Theatre (Geumdan Hall)	Oct 5	
2013	Son Sook's Mother	손숙의 어머니	Mother	Busan Citizen's Centre Grand Theatre	Nov 2–3	
2013	Son Sook's Mother	손숙의 어머니	Mother	Pyeongtaek Nambu Culture and Arts Centre	Nov 23	
2014	Son Sook's Mother	손숙의 어머니	Mother	Suncheon Culture and Arts Centre Grand Theatre	Feb 7–8	
2014	With Father, I and Hong-mae	아버지와 나와 홍매와	Mother	National Theater of Korea Daloreum Theater	March 2–30	
2014	Son Sook's Mother	손숙의 어머니	Mother	Seongnam Art Centre Opera House	May 8–9	
2014	Son Sook's Mother	손숙의 어머니	Mother	Grand Performance Hall of Incheon Seo-gu Cultural Centre	May 24	
2014	Please Look After Mom	엄마를 부탁해	Mother	Seoul Arts Center CJ Towol Theater	June 7–29	
2014	Please Look After Mom	엄마를 부탁해	Mother	Gimhae Culture Center Maru Hall	July 5–6	
2014	Autumn Sonata	가을소나타	Charlotte	Daehak-ro Arts Theatre Grand Theatre	Aug 22 – Sep 6	
2014	Hello My Butterfly	안녕, 마이 버터플라이	Theater Actress	Mapo Art Centre Art Hall Mac	September 19–20	
2015	Mother	어머니	Mother	Myeongdong Arts Theatre	Jan 31 – Feb 16	
2015	Snow in March	3월의 눈	Lee Soon	National Theater of Korea Daloreum Theater	March 13–29	
2015	Snow in March	3월의 눈	Lee Soon	Cheonan Arts Center	April 3–5	
2015	Korea University Theater, 110th anniversary performance The Cherry Orchard	고대극회, 개교 110주년 기념공연 '벚꽃동산'	Madame Lyubov Andreievna Ranevskaya	Sejong Center for the Performing Arts M Theater	August 25–30	
2015	The 1st Monodrama Festival - Soon Sook	제1회 모노드라마 페스티벌 - 손숙	Soon Sook	Namhansanseong Art Hall Small Theatre	September 4–5	
2015	Three Tall Women	키 큰 세 여자	B	Myeongdong Arts Theatre	Oct 3–25	
2015	Soon Sook Woman	손숙의 그여자	Woman	Sanwoolim Small Theater	November 12 – December 6	
2016	With Father, I and Hong-mae	아버지와 나와 홍매와	Mother	National Theatre Daloreum Theatre	April 9–24	
2016	Hamlet	햄릿	Actor 2	National Theater Haeoreum Theater	July 12 – August 7	
2016	Soon Sook Woman	손숙의 그여자	Woman	Myeongin Hall, Korea Sori Cultural Centre	August 19	
2016	Soon Sook Woman	손숙의 그여자	Woman	Mapo Art Centre Play Mac	August 28	
2016	Soon Sook Woman	손숙의 그여자	Woman	Busan Haeundae Cultural Centre Haeundae Hall (large performance hall)	August 31	
2016	Love Song	사랑별곡	Sun-ja	Dongguk University Lee Haerang Arts Theater	September 4	
2016	Love Song	사랑별곡	Sun-ja	Incheon Culture & Arts Center Grand Hall	October 22–23	
2016	Death of a Salesman	세일즈맨의 죽음		Asian Culture Center	December 3–4	
2016	Death of a Salesman	세일즈맨의 죽음		Arko Arts Theater	December 13–22	
2016	Soon Sook Woman	손숙의 그여자	Woman	Gyeongnam Gyeongsangnam-do Culture and Arts Center Grand Performance Hall	November 4	
2017	Death of a Salesman	세일즈맨의 죽음		Daejeon Seoul Arts Centre Ensemble Hall	January 13–14	
2017	Death of a Salesman	세일즈맨의 죽음		Uijeongbu Arts Centre Grand Theatre	February 10–12	
2017	Death of a Salesman	세일즈맨의 죽음		Suwon SK Atrium Grand Performance Hall	February 17–18	
2017	Death of a Salesman	세일즈맨의 죽음		Ulsan Culture and Arts Centre Small Performance Hall	February 24–25	
2017	Death of a Salesman	세일즈맨의 죽음		Gyeongju Arts	February 28 – March 1	
2017	Son Sook's mono drama <My most Najong Ginny>	손숙의 모노드라마<나의 가장 나종 지니인 것>		Asia Culture Center Theater 1	May 27–28	
2017	Story of three girls	세 여자 이야기		Myeongju Art Center	June 3–8	
2017	Love Song	사랑별곡	Sun-ja	Boseong-gun	September 7	
2017	Love Song	사랑별곡	Sun-ja	Changnyeong-gun Culture and Arts Center	September 9	
2017	Love Song	사랑별곡	Sun-ja	Eumseong Culture	September 15	
2017	Jangsu Sanghoe	장수상회	Im Geum-nim	National Theater of Korea Daloreum Theater	September 15 – October 8	
2017	Love Song	사랑별곡	Sun-ja	Gwangju Namhansanseong Art Hall Grand Theatre	September 17	
2017	Love Song	사랑별곡	Sun-ja	Gwangju Grand Performance Hall of Yeoncheon Sureul Art Hall	September 23	
2017	(2017) SPAF Seoul International Performing Arts Festival: White Rabbit Red Rabbit <Lee Ho-jae>	(2017) SPAF 서울국제공연예술제: 하얀 토끼 빨간 토끼 <이호재>	herself	Arko Arts Theater small theater	September 24	
2017	Son Sook Plays About Life - Uijeongbu	손숙 연극 인생을 이야기하다 - 의정부해피토크콘서트		Uijeongbu Arts Centre Grand Theatre	September 27	
2017	Love Song	사랑별곡	Sun-ja	Iksan Arts Centre Grand Performance Centre	October 13–14	
2018	Snow in March	3월의 눈	Lee Soon	Myeongdong Arts Theatre	Feb 7 – March 11	
2018	Jangsu Sanghoe	장수상회	Im Geum-nim	Asan Lifelong Learning Center	June 26	
2018	Jangsu Sanghoe	장수상회	Im Geum-nim	Incheon Namdong Sorae Art Hall	August 18	
2018	Jangsu Sanghoe	장수상회	Im Geum-nim	Daehangno Uniplex 1	September 7 – October 9	
2018	Love Song	사랑별곡	Sun-ja	Gimpo Art Hall	October 13	
2018	Love Song	사랑별곡	Sun-ja	Jung-gu Cultural Center Incheon	October 26–27	
2018	Love Song	사랑별곡	Sun-ja	Inje Haneulnaerin Center Grand Hall	November 11	
2018	Jangsu Sanghoe	장수상회		Iksan Arts Center Grand Hall	November 24–25	
2018	Jangsu Sanghoe	장수상회		Cheongju Arts Center Grand Hall	December 1–2	
2018	Jangsu Sanghoe	장수상회		Daegu EXCO Auditorium	December 15–16	
2018	Jangsu Sanghoe	장수상회		Suwon SK Atrium Grand Performance Hall	December 21–22	
2018	Jangsu Sanghoe	장수상회	Im Geum-nim	Gwangju Culture	December 28–29	
2018–2019	I Love You	사랑해요, 당신	Pretty Song	Daehangno Art One Theater 1	Dec 6 – Feb 10	
2019	Jangsu Sanghoe	장수상회	Im-geum-nim	Suncheon Culture	January 26	
2019	Jangsu Sanghoe	장수상회	Im-geum-nim	3.15 Art Centre Grand Theatre	February 9–10	
2019	I Love You	사랑해요, 당신	Pretty Song	Ulsan Culture and Arts Centre Small Performance Hall	February 16–17	
2019	Jangsu Sanghoe	장수상회	Im-geum-nim	Grand Performance Hall of Cheonan Arts Centre	February 23–24	
2019	Jangsu Sanghoe	장수상회	Im Geum-nim	Bupyeong Art Centre Haenuri Theatre	March 16–17	
2019	Jangsu Sanghoe	장수상회	Im Geum-nim	Wonju University, Gangneung Haeram Cultural Centre	March 9–10	
2019	Jangsu Sanghoe	장수상회	Im Geum-nim	Goyang Eoullim Nuri Oullim Theatre	March 30–31	
2019	Jangsu Sanghoe	장수상회	Im Geum-nim	Grand performance hall of Gyeongju Arts Centre	April 12–13	
2019	I Love You	사랑해요, 당신	Pretty Song	Gyeongsan Citizens' Center	April 14	
2019	Jangsu Sanghoe	장수상회	Im Geum-nim	Sejong Culture and Arts Centre	April 18	
2019	Jangsu Sanghoe	장수상회	Im Geum-nim	Anseong-dul Art Hall Grand Performance Hall	May 3–4	
2019	Jangsu Sanghoe	장수상회	Im Geum-nim	Gumi Culture and Arts Centre Grand Performance Hall	May 17–18	
2019	Jangsu Sanghoe	장수상회	Im Geum-nim	Gangdong Art Centre Grand Theatre Han River	May 25 to 26	
2019	I Love You	사랑해요, 당신	Pretty Song	Andong Culture and Arts Centre Ungbu Hall	June 1	
2019	Jangsu Sanghoe	장수상회	Im Geum-nim	Busan Cultural Center Central Theater	July 5–6	
2019	I love you - Miryang	그대를 사랑합니다 - 밀양	Pretty Song	Miryang Arirang Art Centre Grand Theatre	August 6	
2019	Jangsu Sanghoe	장수상회	Im Geum-nim	Gwanglim Art Centre Jangcheon Hall	August 30 – September 22	
2019	Jangsu Sanghoe	장수상회	Im Geum-nim	Geumn Narae Art Hall	November 1–2	
2019	Jangsu Sanghoe	장수상회	Im Geum-nim	Gyeonggi Art Centre Grand Theatre	November 30–December 1	
2019	Jangsu Sanghoe	장수상회	Im Geum-nim	Suseong Artpia Paper Hall	December 14	
2019	Jangsu Sanghoe	장수상회	Im Geum-nim	Gyeongnam Culture and Arts Centre	December 21–22	
2019–2020	I Love You	그대를 사랑합니다	Pretty Song	SKON1, Seogyeong University Performing Arts Centre	Nov 22 – Feb 2	
2020	Jangsu Sanghoe	장수상회	Im Geum-nim	Seongnam Art Centre Opera House	January 18–19	
2020	Jangsu Sanghoe	장수상회	Im Geum-nim	Grand performance hall of Gyeongnam Culture and Arts Centre	January 21–22	
2020	Jangsu Sanghoe	장수상회	Im Geum-nim	Gyeonggi-do Gwangjumun Arts Centre	February 1–2	
2020	With my father and me, Hongmae	아버지와 나와 홍매와	Mother	S Theatre, Sejong Centre for the Performing Arts	February 14–29	
2020	Jangsu Sanghoe	장수상회	Im Geum-nim	Ulsan Culture and Arts Centre	June 7	
2021	The 5th anniversary of the Jangsu Sangho	연극 장수상회 5주년 특별공연	Im Geum-nim	Seoul Arts Center CJ Towol Theater	March 19 – Apr 11	
2021	Jangsu Sangho	장수상회	Im Geum-nim	Gimcheon	August 4–5	
2021	Jangsu Sangho	장수상회	Im Geum-nim	Yangcheon Cultural Centre Grand Theatre	September 21–22	
2021	Jangsu Sangho	장수상회	Im Geum-nim	Hanam Culture and	September 25–26	
2021	Jangsu Sangho	장수상회	Im Geum-nim	Centum City Sohyang Theater Shinhan Card Hall	October 2–3	
2021	Jangsu Sangho	장수상회	Im Geum-nim	GS Caltex Yeulmaru	October 9	
2021	Jangsu Sangho	장수상회	Im Geum-nim	Chonbuk National	October 16	
2021	Water Station	물의 정거장		Daehak-ro Arts Theatre Small Theatre	October 21–24	
2021	Jangsu Sangho	장수상회	Im Geum-nim	Ulsan Culture	October 23	
2021	Jangsu Sangho	장수상회	Im Geum-nim	Bucheon Civic Centre Grand Performance Hall	Nov 27–28	
2021	Jangsu Sangho	장수상회	Im Geum-nim	Yeungnam University	December 25	
2022	Jangsu Sangho	장수상회	Im Geum-nim	Nowon Culture and Arts Centre Grand Performance Hall	February 19	
2022	Merry Christmas, Mom	제6회 늘푸른연극제 메리크리스마스 엄마	Mother	JTN Art Hall	February 24–27	
2022	Jangsu Sangho	장수상회	Im Geum-nim	Grand Performance Hall of Dangjin Arts Centre	April 23–24	
2022	Jangsu Sangho	장수상회	Im Geum-nim	Ansan Culture and Arts Center	May 7–8	
2022	Jangsu Sangho	장수상회	Im Geum-nim	Jeju Art Center	May 14	
2022	Jangsu Sangho	장수상회	Im Geum-nim	Suwon SK Atrium Grand Performance Hall	May 27–29	
2022	Jangsu Sangho	장수상회	Im Geum-nim	Cheonan City Hall Bongseo Hall	June 10–11	
2022	Hamlet	햄릿	Actor 2	National Theater Haeoreum Theater	July 13 – August 13	
2022	Jangsu Sangho	장수상회	Im Geum-nim	Yongsan Art Hall Grand Theatre Mir	Sep 17–18	
2023	Tocatta	토카타	Female	LG Arts Center Seoul U+ Stage	August 19 – September 10	

== Bibliography ==
- Love Out
- Smile, love (2006)
- There is no one without scars in their heart
- Looking at the sky from the edge of a cliff
- What makes me so
- Crying and laughing and living together
- A very special interview with Son Sook (2007)

== Accolades ==
=== Awards and nominations ===
Awards and nominations received
Year	Award ceremony	Category	Nominee / Work	Result	Ref.
1972	8th Baeksang Arts Awards	Reader Popularity Award	Soon Sook (Note: Tied with Ahn Eun-suk, Baek Sung-hee, Lee Soon-jae, Oh Hyeon-kyung.)	Won	
1975	11th Baeksang Arts Awards	Best Actress Award in Theatre	Active Volcano	Won	
1977	13th Baeksang Arts Awards	Best Actress Award in Theatre	Hong Dang-moo	Won	
1979	15th Baeksang Arts Awards	Best Actress Award in Theatre	Guest	Won	
1983	19th Baeksang Arts Awards	Best Actress Award in Theatre	Puss in Boots	Won	
1986	Korean Theatre Festival	Best Actress Award in Theatre	Soon Sook	Won	
1990	11th Blue Dragon Film Awards	Best Supporting Actress Award	Just Because You Are a Woman	Won	
1991	Hankook Ilbo Theater and Film Awards	Best Actress Award	Soon Sook	Won	
1993	MBC Drama Awards	Radio Grand Prize	Women's Age	Won	
1996	Korean Literary Association	Best Literary Award — Theatre and Film	Soon Sook	Won	
1997	Baekjo Award	Best Dressed	Soon Sook	Won	
1997	7th Lee Hae-rang Theater Award	Main Award	Soon Sook	Won	
1998	Korean Theatre Actors Association	Actress of the Year Award	Soon Sook	Won	
1999	35th Baeksang Arts Awards	Best Actress Award in Theatre	Mother	Won	
2013	3rd Beautiful Artist Award	Best Actress Award in Theatre	Soon Sook	Won	
2020	2020 KBS Drama Awards	One-act Play Award	Drama Special Women's Streak	Won	

=== State honors ===
Name of country, award ceremony, year given, and name of honor
Country	Award Ceremony	Year	Honor	Ref.
South Korea	The Ministry of Culture and Sports Award Ceremony	1998	Presidential Commendation	
South Korea	Korean Popular Culture and Arts Awards (Note: Honors are given at the Korean Popular Culture and Arts Awards, arranged by the Korea Creative Content Agency and hosted by the Ministry of Culture, Sports and Tourism. They are awarded to those who have contributed to the arts and South Korea's pop culture.)	2012	Eungwan Order of Cultural Merit (2nd Class)	

=== Listicles ===
Name of publisher, year listed, name of listicle, and placement
Publisher	Year	Listicle	Placement	Ref.
Asia Today	2013	Actors in their 60s and 70s who dominate the theater stage	Top 3	
Book & People (written by Jang Won-jae)	2015	Who is an actor	Top 15	
Korean Theater (Note: Jeong Jin-soo, a theater director and former professor at Sungkyunkwan University and the head of the People's Theater Company, says about those who represent Korean theater. Representative Jeong collects the lives of 34 leading Korean theater artists and publishes 'The Life of a Theater Artist - A Biography of Korea's Representative Theater Artists.' The book is a compilation of interviews with 34 theater artists from the content serialized by the author in the magazine 'Korean Theater'.)	2019	34 Leading Korean Theater Artist	Top 34	

== Others ==
- In 1995, KBS 1TV's Human Theatre aired "Actor's Notebook" about Son Sook's diary, and actor Heo Yoon-jung's main characters Son Sook and Park Seung-ho appeared as Son Sook's husband Kim Seong-ok.
