= Pete McCormack =

Canadian author, filmmaker, screenwriter and musician

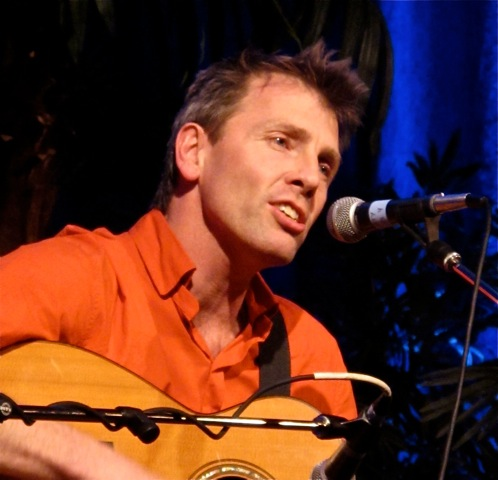
- McCormack performing in June 2010
- Born: January 27, 1965 (age 61); Thetford, Norfolk, England
- Occupations: Author; filmmaker; screenwriter; musician
- Website: petemccormack.com

Pete McCormack (born January 27, 1965) is a Canadian author, filmmaker, screenwriter and musician. He directed the Academy Award short-listed documentary Facing Ali and the Leacock Award-nominated novel Understanding Ken. He is the creator of the HBO Canada documentary television series Sports on Fire.

== Film ==
In 2003, McCormack directed and wrote his first feature film, the award-winning See Grace Fly, starring Paul McGillion and Gina Chiarelli. Chiarelli won multiple awards and was nominated for a Genie Award for her role as Grace McKinley, a woman suffering from schizophrenia.

In 2006, McCormack wrote and co-directed (with Jesse James Miller) the award-winning documentary Uganda Rising, about the plight of the people of Northern Uganda. The film was narrated by Academy Award-winner Kevin Spacey. For UNICEF in 2007, McCormack wrote and co-directed (with Tim Hardy) the 25-minute Pierce Brosnan-narrated short film Hope in the Time of AIDS about the HIV and AIDS in sub-Saharan Africa, and the potential of antiretroviral drugs.

In 2009, McCormack directed the documentary Facing Ali. The film was short-listed in the 2010 Academy Awards' category for best full-length documentary. In October 2009, the film won the Audience Choice award for Best Documentary at the Vancouver International Film Festival.

In 2011, McCormack directed I Am Bruce Lee, a biographical documentary of Bruce Lee. Its debut on Spike TV was the highest rated documentary in the station's history, reaching 1.4 million viewers. Spike's previous record-holder was McCormack's 2009 documentary, Facing Ali.

In 2015, McCormack created, directed and executive produced the HBO Canada documentary television series Sports On Fire. In 2016, his film Spirit Unforgettable, a profile of the rock band Spirit of the West on their final concert tour, premiered at the Hot Docs Canadian International Documentary Festival.

Screenplays:

- Whirlygirl, 2006, directed by Academy Award Winning producer Jim Wilson (Dances With Wolves)
- Plague City: SARS in Toronto (TV movie), 2005
- The Blue Butterfly, 2004, directed by Léa Pool and starring Academy Award winner William Hurt.

== Novels ==
McCormack's first novel, Shelby, about a university drop-out who falls for an exotic dancer near the end of her career, was published in 1994.

McCormack's second novel, Understanding Ken, was released in 1998. The novel focused on a young boy who creates a mythology around hockey, the Montreal Canadiens and Ken Dryden in order to deal with the trauma of his parents' divorce.

In 1999, the novel was nominated for the Stephen Leacock Award for Canadian Humour, and named one of the 10 best books of the year by the Ottawa Citizen.

== Music ==
McCormack has released three independent CDs. His debut CD, Breathe, was released in 1995. Paul Hyde of Payola$ fame, and members of Spirit of the West, Geoffrey Kelly, Hugh MacMillan and drummer and producer Vince Ditrich played on the CD. Renowned jazz musician and two-time Juno Award winner Brad Turner played the trumpet solo on the opening track "Stay With Me."

McCormack released a second CD, Trust, in 1998. The track, "Be Brave Tonight", was screen-tested in Los Angeles as the proposed song to close the Kevin Costner-film Message in a Bottle. The song was ultimately not chosen because the screen-test audience reportedly found the song combined with the film's ending "too depressing."

McCormack recorded an unplugged third album, Wide Open, in 2008.

In 2009, he contributed the closing song to the Academy Award-shortlisted documentary, Facing Ali, which he also directed.
