= Park Jeong-ja (actress) =

South Korean actress (born 1942)

- 박정자
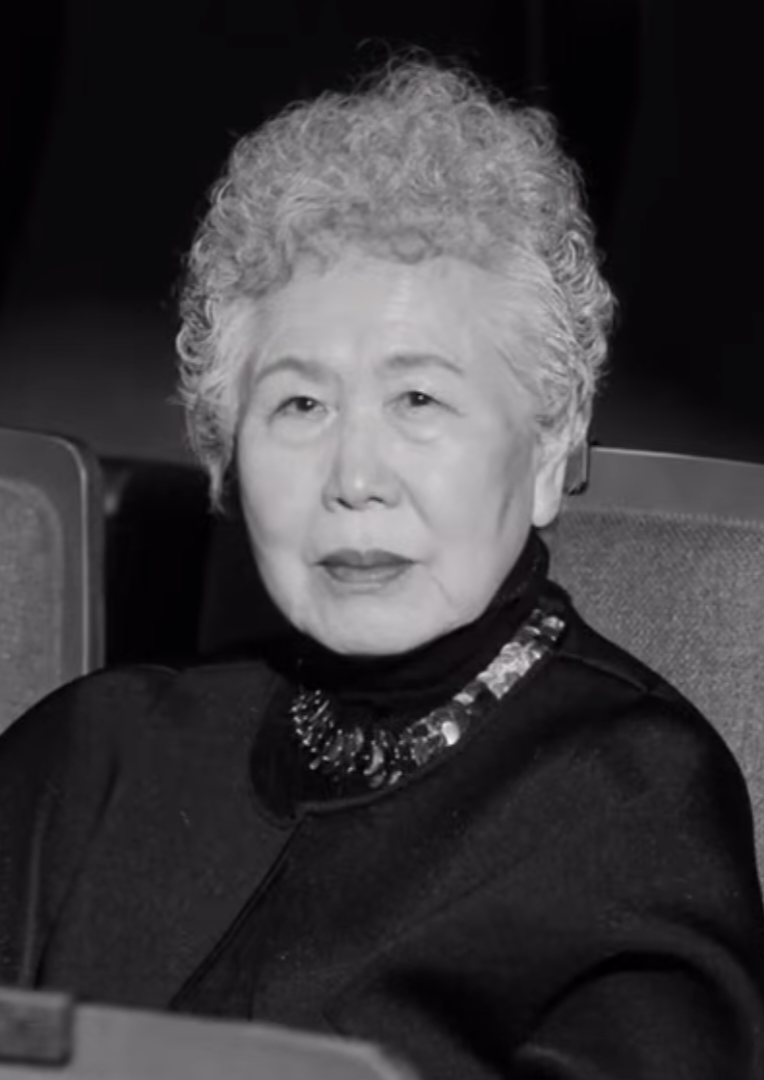
- Park in 2026
- Born: 12 March 1942 (age 84); Incheon, Korea, Empire of Japan
- Other name: Park Masako
- Education: Ewha Womans University Honour Diploma
- Occupation: Actress
- Years active: 1962–present
- Organization: National Academy of Arts of Korea
- Relatives: Park Sang-ho (brother); Park Seong-jun (nephew)
- Awards: Lee Hae-rang Theater Award
- Honours: Bogwan Order of Cultural Merit (2007)

Korean name
- Hangul: 박정자
- Hanja: 朴正子
- RR: Bak Jeongja
- MR: Pak Chŏngja

Park Jeong-ja (Korean: 박정자, born March 12, 1942) is a South Korean actress. She made her debut as a theater actor in 1962. She became the first actress to receive the Lee Hae-rang Theatre Award in 1997, a prominent Korean theater award. She is also the only actress to have won the Dong-A Theatre Award for Best Actress three times: for her lead role as Ondal's mother in Where and How Shall We Meet? (1971, 7th edition); and for supporting roles as the second wife in The Egg and the aunt in A Country as Far as the Sky (1986, 22nd edition), as well as Monique in Women in Crisis (1987, 23rd edition).

Park Jeong-ja has also achieved significant recognition as a film actress. She received the Grand Bell Awards for Best Supporting Actress twice: in 1975 for director Kim Ki-young's The Promise of the Flesh, and in 1985 for director Jeong Jin-woo's The MA-NIM. Her other notable film appearances include Growing Generously, Anemone, and Widow's Dance.

Since its establishment in 2005, Park Jeong-ja has served as chairman of the board of directors for the Korea Activist Welfare Foundation, supporting medical and living expenses for theater practitioners. In 2007, the government awarded her the Bogwan Order of Cultural Merit. In 2008, She was granted membership in the National Academy of Arts of Korea.

== Early life and education ==
Park Jeong-ja, the youngest of five children, was born on March 12, 1942, in Sorae Port, Namdong District, Incheon, Korea, Empire of Japan. Her father was a native of Incheon, while her mother originated from Ganghwa Island. Her Japanese name was Masako (正子). Her father selected Chinese character "Baaljeong (正)" as the middle character for her name. Reflecting on her name, Park later commented, "It is uncommon for a woman's name to include the character 'Baaljeong.' However, I believe that 'brightness' has been a guiding force in my life, bringing me to where I am today."

During her childhood in Seaside Town, she was surrounded by salt farms and narrow-gauge trains. Her father ran a brewery wholesale business called Cheonil Sanghoe in Sorae Port and also served as the village head. In the wake of Korea's liberation in 1945, her family moved to Sinheung-dong, Incheon, settling in a Jeoksan House previously occupied by Japanese residents. However, that same year, her father fell ill and died. Following his death, Park's family relocated to Yongsan, Seoul. There, her mother opened a textile factory to support her five children.

It was in Seoul that Park first encountered the world of theater. In April 1950, she witnessed the play "Wonsullang" at Bumin-gwan, a theater then located where Seoul City Hall now stands. She was able to attend plays thanks to her older brother, Park Sang-ho, who worked as a research student at Shinhyup Theater Company. In that era, television was non-existent, and radios were only found in one out of every ten households, making the opportunity to attend live theater a privilege.

I saw my first play when I was nine years old (Korean Age). In April 1950, before the June 25 Incident occurred, at the theater now called Bumin-gwan. My brother appeared in a minor role in 'Wonsulang' written and directed by Yoo Chi-jin (柳致眞, 1905-1974). I was ecstatic. Even now, I still remember that scene. Kim Dong-hoon (金東勳) plays the lead role of Won-sullang, Kim Seon-yeong (金仙英) plays Jin Dal-rae, the girl who follows Won-sullang, and Baek Seong-hee (白星姬) plays the princess who is Won-sullang's fiancée. Kim Sun-young was a North Korean actress during the June 25 Uprising. She was short, had a sonorous voice, and was an impressively tall actress.

Following the outbreak of the Korean War on June 25, on June 25, Park Jeong-ja's older brother fled to Daegu with the Shinhyup Theater Company. He enlisted locally and participated in consolation performances as a member of the military art corps. Meanwhile, her mother took her four young daughters to seek refuge in her hometown, Ganghwa Island. After the January 4, 1951, retreat, her family relocated again, this time to Jeju Island. Park distinctly recalls embarking on a US military ship, the LST, from Wolmido to Jeju Island. During their stay, her mother frequently traveled between Jeju, Daegu, and Mokpo, buying and selling various goods to make a living. These memories have led Park to consider Jongdal-ri, Gujwa-eup, Jeju, as another hometown. She occasionally visits to reminisce about those days, especially when she misses her mother.

After three years of war, an armistice was declared, and Park's family returned to Incheon. She transferred to the 4th grade at Parkmun Elementary School, continuing her education in her hometown until the beginning of the 6th grade. During her time at Parkmun Elementary School, each grade had only one class, and all students were female. The school was situated within Dapdong Cathedral, leading her to spend significant time in the church's front yard. She also appeared in a Sunday school play, which led her to wonder why such an enjoyable activity occurred only once a year on Christmas. After returning to Seoul, Park engaged in various activities during her middle and high school years at Jinmyeong Girls' Middle and High School. She participated in oratory, choir, and Korean dance. The stage became her calling, and she embraced every opportunity to perform, showcasing her talent and dedication.

During her university entrance exam preparations, Chung-Ang University established a Theater and Film Department. Park, however, chose not to apply, instead unexpectedly pursuing Journalism at Ewha Womans University. In her freshman year, Park intentionally avoided theater, deeming her prior experiences sufficient. She found university theater somewhat juvenile and uninteresting, thus neither auditioning nor participating. By her sophomore year, however, theater's pull became irresistible. In 1962, during her second year, Park auditioned for Jean Racine's Phèdre, produced by The Ewha Womans University College of Liberal Arts Theater Department (이화여대 문리대 연극부). A series of humbling experiences followed: despite her confidence in securing the lead role of Phaedra, Park was cast as Panov, a maid with only 16 lines. Her onstage stiffness and a mistake led to a scolding from director.

Starting in 1962, Park actively participated in three plays during her university years. The following year, she performed in The House of Bernarda Alba, directed by Heo Gyu (許珪, 1934–2000). She received rave reviews for her role as an 80-year-old woman, with one critic commenting that "college plays threaten established plays." These experiences laid a solid foundation for her career, largely due to the unique nature of The Ewha Womans University College of Liberal Arts Theater Department (이화여대 문리대 연극부). It functioned beyond a typical club or departmental project, embodying a "college of arts play" concept. Performances occurred at prestigious venues like the Drama Center and Myeongdong Art Theater, not just the university auditorium. Renowned professional directors guided the productions, resulting in significant acclaim.

== Career ==
=== Beginning as voice actress ===
Park's passion for acting motivated her to pursue a career in voice acting, as radio was the primary form of entertainment before widespread television access. In 1963, during her third year of university, Dong-A Broadcasting was established and announced open recruitment for voice actors. Despite fierce competition—approximately 150 applicants per position—Park applied. She successfully passed the first, second, and third rounds of exams. However, a university prohibition on students appearing in broadcasts created a dilemma, and Park ultimately chose to drop out.

During her time as a voice actor, Park worked alongside classmates and other theater actors who also ventured into radio voice acting, including Sami-ja, Jeon Won-ju, and Kim Moo-saeng. She also collaborated with established theater actors like Jang Min-ho and Na Ok-ju. This experience helped her further develop her theater acting skills, including improving her pronunciation.

Upon the request of university president Kim Gap-soon (1914–2005), Park continued to practice theater with students after work and perform on stage. In 1964, they staged Federico García Lorca's play Blood Wedding at the National Theater of Korea in Myeongdong. It was during this period that she met director Kim Jeong-ok, who later became her lifelong theater companion. Kim Jeong-ok was a prominent director from the Minjung Theater. In addition to teaching and directing at The Ewha Womans University College of Liberal Arts Theater Department (이화여대 문리대 연극부), he was also a professor of Theater and Film Studies at Chung-Ang University.

=== Career as member of Jayu Theater ===
In 1966, Kim Jeong-ok and Lee Byung-bok established Jayu Theater, inviting actors from the "Minjung Theater" such as Na Ok-ju, Kim Hye-ja, Ham Hyun-jin, and Choi Sang-hyun as founding members. Na Ok-ju recommended Park to join. Park agreed, pleased to work in the same troupe with Kim Jeong-ok. Subsequently, the company expanded its roster to include actors Kim Yong-rim, Yoon So-jung, Kim Gwan-soo, Choi Bul-am, Moon Oh-jang, and even film director Kim Hong-sik.

In March 1966, they gathered at "Hyangwon," a renowned restaurant in Jingogae. Following the founding meeting, with Lee Byung-bok as the representative, Jayu Theater was officially established on April 29. Jayu's inaugural performance was The Feast of the Followers, an Italian farce by Eduardo De Filippo (original title: Poverty and Nobility) about poor servants disguising themselves as nobles. At Kim Jeong-ok's suggestion, Jayu Theater initially planned to stage Friedrich Dürrenmatt's The Physicists. However, due to its difficulty and philosophical nature, they changed the play to The Feast of the Followers. With less than a month until the performance date, they felt pressure and urgency. They rehearsed tirelessly in Lee Byung-bok's reception room in Jangchung-dong. Despite the challenging start, the performance was well-received, particularly for the actors' strong acting. This successful production marked the beginning of Jayu Theater's journey.

Like the saying 'There must be a small hill for a cow,' I, too, had a definite small hill in my life. Established in June 1966, the theater company called "Jayu" (Freedom) has one of the longest histories in the Korean theater industry. To me, Jayu was not just a simple hill, but a place that felt like home. Jayu was the starting point where I, Park Jeong-ja, an aspiring actress, could have the space and time to become a star in the theater world.

During her time with Jayu, Park participated in notable productions including The Feast of the Followers, The Diver Ashore, Murder Fantasy, Marius, The Medal of the Dead, Song of the Sad Cafe, Confessions for a Black Prostitute, Where and What Will We Become?, Couple Practice, and approximately 30 other works.

After years on stage with Jayu, some productions intertwine with Park's personal history, notably Where and How Shall We Meet?, written by Choi In-hoon and directed by Kim Jeong-ok. In the original 1970 production at Myeongdong National Theater, and its 1974 and 1986 revivals, Park portrayed On Dal's Mother. Throughout the play, she remained silent until her son, On Dal, died in battle and her daughter-in-law, Princess Pyeonggang, lost her life opposing the rival political faction. Left alone onstage, she delivered a soliloquy, saying, "Is it snowing...? Why is he so late?" It was during this production in 1970 that Park received her first Dong-A Theatre Award. During the 1974 performance, Park took to the stage in her final term of pregnancy. In an early scene where she had to lie on the floor upon meeting the princess, she worried the fetus might shift. The baby moved so much that she was concerned about such an occurrence. In the dressing room, she gasped for breath, barely making it onto the stage to endure each day's performance.

Park had an opportunity to reprise her role as Mother in Federico García Lorca's play Blood Wedding during an outdoor performance at the Malaga International Theatre Festival in Spain, the playwright's hometown. The audience was enthralled even without translation. Local newspapers ran headlines such as, "Lorca was not betrayed." In response to the assessment that the actress playing the mother was a world-class performer, the excited interpreter relayed Kim Jeong-ok's words, softly but earnestly: "Park Jeong-ja is already a world-class actress. Her fame has simply not reached Spain yet."

=== Works with Sanullim Theater ===
Park first work with director Lim Young-woong CEO of Sanullim Theater, was play in 'A Country As Far As the Sky'. She acted alongside Jeon Jeon-song, Joo Ho-seong, Jo Myeong-nam and Baek Seong-hee. In January 1986, Park won her second Dong-A Theatre Award for her performance.

In 1986, Lim Young-woong planned Korean adaptations of Simone de Beauvoir's play Women in Crisis to commemorate the first anniversary of Sanullim Theater's opening. As CEO Lim sought an actress for the female lead, he asked Park for recommendations. Park suggested Kim Hye-ja and Kim Min-ja, but both were unavailable. Park then recommended herself. CEO Lim initially rejected the idea, expecting a more established actress, which wounded Park's pride. Eventually, CEO Lim approached her, handed her the script, and suggested she join the production.

The play was a success. From the VIP performance on March 30, the response was exceptional. Lee Byeong-bok, CEO of Jayu Theater Company, told director Lim, "Thank you for making Park Jeong-ja a woman." From the next day, housewife audiences flocked to Sanullim Small Theater. Audiences reacted strongly to lines spoken by Cho Myeong-nam, who played her husband, and when Park Jeong-ja's character complained, many housewives sobbed. The play's popularity was such that it was covered in the social section of newspapers rather than the cultural section. Park described it as a work that drew a large audience and marked a significant moment in Korean theater. For her role as Monique, Park received the Dong-A Theatre Award, Baeksang Arts Award, and Seoul Drama Critics Group Award, achieving a triple crown in the theater industry.

However, that year coincided with the 20th anniversary of the Jayu Theater Company, which chose Where and How Shall We Meet?, based on Choi In-hoon's work, for its commemoration. A strained relationship developed between two prominent Korean theater directors, Kim Jeong-ok and Lim Young-woong, as neither wanted to relinquish Park. Park stated that the clash between the two directors made her feel trapped, marking it as the most challenging moment in her career. Women in Crisis continued to play to packed houses daily throughout the summer. While an unprecedented hit had emerged after a long time, its lead actress was contemplating stepping down, torn between the two theater companies. After much negotiation, Park chose Jayu's production. Women in Crisis continued its run with a change in its lead actress. Kim Jeong-ok avoided making eye contact with Park for sometime, but he finally praised her after her first performance saying that Park shines onstage.

In 1990, Park had a notable moment in her acting career during the performance of Marsha Norman's play 'night, Mother. Park portrayed a mother desperately trying to dissuade her daughter from suicide. The play climaxed in the final conversation, where the daughter hinted at her intentions before retreating to her room, locking the door with a pistol. In a monologue before the locked door, Park's character alternated between soothing, pleading, shouting, venting anger, and ultimately collapsing in despair when gunshots rang out. This sequence, traversing a wide spectrum of emotions and personalities in just over a minute, exemplified Park's talent. Park won Grand prize and Best Actress Award in 8th Baeksang Arts Awards for her performance. When asked about reprising this performance, Park humbly responds, "That's high praise. However, I have no plans to revisit play 'night, Mother. I don't believe I can surpass what I accomplished back then. Nevertheless, there are a few other works that offer similar depth and challenges."

In 1991, Park worked again with Sanullim Theater with the play Mom Discovered the Sea at Fifty. It was performed for almost a year and attracted more than 50,000 audiences, and set a record of winning four categories including Best Picture, Best Actor, Best Director, and Best Translation in the free entry section of the Seoul Theater Festival.

In the same year, the "Flower Bouquet Society" was established with 17 members who appreciated Park's notable plays such as Mom Discovered the Sea at Fifty and Woman in Crisis. Twelve of these members had already formed a group as early as 1987. The members chose the name "Flower Bouquet" to symbolize the desire to spread the subtle and lasting fragrance of culture, akin to the scent of dried flowers in a sachet. Members pay an entrance fee of one million won and purchase four theater tickets per person for each of Park's performances, with attendance being mandatory. The collected entrance fees fund the Society's activities or are donated to other organizations in its name.

In 1992, Sanullim Theater relocated to Dongsung-dong. Its previous small theater in Unni-dong had to close as part of the Seoul Metropolitan Government's initiative to restore Daewongun's private residence. To celebrate the move, a performance of their popular experimental repertoire, Agnes of God, was staged in April. Park played the role of the head nun, while Son Sook portrayed Dr. Livingstone. Shin Ae-ra and Jung Soo-young alternated in playing the character of Agnes.

In 2003, Park Jeong-ja took on the role of Maude in the second encore performance of 19 and 80. Originally titled Harold and Maude by Colin Higgins, the play premiered in Korea in 1987 with Kim Hye-ja and Kim Joo-seung. Directed by Jang Doo-yi, the story follows Maude, an eccentric 80-year-old grandmother who dreams of becoming an astronaut, and her relationship with 19-year-old Harold, who helps her discover her own strength. Park performed in 19 and 80 five times (in 2003, 2004, 2006, 2008, and 2012), each time with different co-stars. The 2008 version was adapted into a musical. Park personally produced all five productions.

== Other activities ==
In May 2005, the Theater People's Welfare Foundation was established, with Park assuming the role of its inaugural president. The is to support the stability of actors' lives in retirement and scholarship programs for their children. Initially hesitant about creating an organization for the theater, Park was eventually persuaded by her colleagues. Park also believed that she had benefited greatly from theater and should contribute back to the theater community.

== Personal life ==
Park met her future husband through her friend Lee Ji-seon, a reporter for Women Donga. Lee Ji-seon sought Park's help to organize a consolation performance for a military unit in Gangwon Province, where her brother, Lieutenant Lee Ji-song, was stationed. During Lieutenant Lee Ji-song's break from duty, Park and Lee Ji-seon met to discuss the upcoming performance. Alongside their colleagues Choo Song-woong and Ham Hyun-jin, members of the theater group Jayu, they passionately planned and performed the play Friendship. This collaboration and shared experience forged a deep bond, leading to a relationship between Park and Lieutenant Lee Ji-song.

The couple faced opposition from both families due to their four-year age gap, with Park being older. Lee's mother, in particular, strongly objected to their relationship. She was concerned about Lee's career transition from interior design to the advertising industry, believing his decision was solely motivated by his desire to marry Park. This intensified her worries about the perceived instability of his profession. Despite this familial opposition, Park and Lee remained steadfast, marrying in 1972 when Park was 30 and Lee was 26. They had a son and a daughter during their marriage.

In 1973, after graduating from the Department of Western Painting at Hongik University, Lee Ji-song entered the advertising industry. He worked as a commercial director at Manbosa, Yonhap Advertising, Sejong Culture, and Cheil Worldwide, among other companies like Bravocon and Young Age. He became known for creating successful commercials, including one for Ghana Chocolate.

== Filmography ==
=== Film ===
Film appearances
Year	Title		Role	Note	Ref.
Year	English	Korean	Role	Note	Ref.
1972	The Insect Woman	충녀	Madame	supporting actor	
1975	Promise of the Flesh	육체의 약속	Female prison guard	Main Role	
1977	Io Island	이어도	Shaman		
1977	The Reincarnation, Hanne's Moonlight	한네의 승천			
1978	Yeo-su	여수			
1978	The Guest in Room Guest and Mother	사랑방 손님과 어머니	Housekeeper, Ahn Seong-daek	Main Role	
1978	Once Upon a Long Time	옛날 옛적에 훠어이 훠이		Main Role	
1978	Rainy Season	장마		supporting actor	
1978	Soil	흙		supporting actor	
1979	Paljunochopanambo	빨주노초파남보		Main Role	
1981	Ban Geum-ryun	반금련			
1981	Mandala	만다라			
1982	Come Low Unto Us	낮은 데로 임하소서		Bit Role	
1984	Widow Dancing	과부춤	Director of a marriage counseling center	Main Role	
1985	The MA-NIM	자녀목	Nomanim	Main Role	
1986	Lee Jang-ho's Foreign Team	이장호의 외인구단		Bit Role	
1987	Flowers are blooming in a windy day	바람 부는 날에도 꽃은 피고			
1987	Pillar of Mist	안개 기둥		supporting actor	
1989	I Give You Everything	아낌없이 주련다		supporting actor	
1993	Western Avenue	웨스턴 애비뉴		supporting actor	
1995	Sea Anemone	말미잘		Main Role	
2013	Applause	박수건달	Wang Mudang		
2015	Invited	초대	Grandmother	Short film	
2016	Master	마스터	Shin Seon-saeng	Special appearance	
2018	Herstory	허스토리	Mrs. Hong of the brothel	Special appearance	
2021	Love to See	보는 것을 사랑한다	My Role	Special appearance	

=== Television series ===
Television series appearances
Year	Title		Role	Note	Ref.
Year	English	Korean	Role	Note	Ref.
1987	Eolgureomneun Moksori	얼굴없는 목소리		MBC	

=== Radio program ===
Radio program
Year	Title	Role	Note	Ref.
2015	EBS Book Reading Radio Reading Series	Announcer	EBS Korea Educational Broadcasting Corporation	

== Stage ==
=== Concert ===
Appearances in music concerts, poetry reading and talk shows
Year	Title		Role	Theater	Date	Ref.
Year	English	Korean	Role	Theater	Date	Ref.
2010	Heavenly Concert Where the Poem Flows	시가 흐르는 천상음악회	Poetry reading	Uijeongbu Arts Centre Grand Theatre	April 24	
2018	March 2018, "Noon Concert"	2018 <정오의 음악회> 3월	Host	National Theatre Sky Theatre	May 19	
2018	2018 Gangneung Seamarq Festival— Summer Praise with Actress Park Jeong-ja	2018 강릉 씨마크 페스티벌 " 연극배우 박정자와 함께하는 여름 예찬"	Poetry reading	Seamark Hotel in Gangneung	August 11	
2018	September 2018, "Noon Concert"	2018 <정오의 음악회> 9월	Host	National Theatre Sky Theatre	September 5	
2018	The 3rd M-PAT Classical Music Festival: Read Aloud Classic	제3회 M―PAT(엠팻) 클래식 음악축제: 책 읽어주는 클래식	Poetry reading	Mapo Central Library	September 20	
2018	October 2018, "Noon Concert"	2018 <정오의 음악회> 10월	Host	National Theatre Sky Theatre	October 17	
2018	November 2018, "Noon Concert"	2018 <정오의 음악회> 11월	Host	National Theatre Sky Theatre	November 7	
2019	March 2019, "Noon Concert"	2019 <정오의 음악회> 3월	Host; Poetry reading	National Theatre Sky Theatre	March 6	
2019	April 2019, "Noon Concert"	2019 <정오의 음악회> 4월	Host; Poetry reading	National Theatre Sky Theatre	April 10	
2019	May 2019, "Noon Concert"	2019 <정오의 음악회> 5월	Host; Poetry reading	National Theatre Sky Theatre	May 22	
2019	June 2019, "Noon Concert"	2019 <정오의 음악회> 6월	Host; Poetry reading	National Theatre Sky Theatre	June 26	
2019	Gangneung sings a movie: Park Jung-ja's poet who loved movies	강릉, 영화를 노래하다: 박정자의 영화를 사랑한 시인	Presenter	Gangneung Arts Center Small Performance Hall	November 9	
2020	Masterpiece reading brunch concert 'Actor who reads books'	명작 낭독 브런치 음악회 '책 읽어주는 배우'	Narrator	Raum Art Center	March 10	

=== Creative musical Theater ===
Creative musical plays performances
Year	Title		Role	Theater	Date	Ref.
Year	English	Korean	Role	Theater	Date	Ref.
1994	Park Jung-ja's November Waltz	박정자의 11월의 왈츠	Park Jeong-ja	Sanullim Theater	October 27	
2009	Do you like Brahms by Park Jeong-ja	박정자의 브람스를 좋아하세요	Park Jeong-ja	Jeongmiso, Daehak-ro Installation Theatre	Feb 7–28	
2009	Do you like Brahms by Park Jeong-ja	박정자의 브람스를 좋아하세요	Park Jeong-ja	Auditorium of the National Museum of Korea	April 2–23	
2012	Park Jeong-ja's November Waltz	박정자의 11월의 왈츠	Park Jeong-ja	Cheonan Arts Center Grand Hall	Nov 24–25	
2013	Park Jeong-ja's November Waltz	박정자의 11월의 왈츠	Park Jeong-ja	Yeoju Cultural Center	Jan 31	
2013	Park Jeong-ja's November Waltz	박정자의 11월의 왈츠	Park Jeong-ja	Uijeongbu Arts Center Small Theater	March 8–9	
2014	Park Jeong-ja's November Waltz	박정자의 11월의 왈츠	Park Jeong-ja	Icheon Art Hall Small Performance Hall	Sep 27	
2014	Take Care of Mom	친정엄마	Mother	Bupyeong Art Center Dalnuri Theater	March 27	
2020	Park Jeong-ja's Actor Theory: Speak Like a Song	박정자의 배우론: 노래처럼 말해줘	Park Jeong-ja	Seoul Arts Centre Free Small Theatre	Feb 6–16	
2021	Park Jeong-ja's musical play: Speak Like a Song- Goyang	박정자의 노래대화극: 노래처럼 말해줘－고양	Park Jeong-ja	Sarasae Theater in Aram Nuri, Goyang	July 31	

=== Musical ===
Musical plays performances
Year	Title		Role	Theater	Date	Ref.
Year	English	Korean	Role	Theater	Date	Ref.
1993	Romantic comedy musical midsummer night's dream	로맨틱코메디 뮤지컬 한여름밤의 꿈		Sejong Center for the Performing Arts Fountain Outdoor Stage	Sep 7–16	
1998	Nunsense	넌센스	Nun	Sejong Center for the Performing Arts Main Auditorium	Jan 31 – Feb 5	
2008	19 and 80	19그리고80	Maude	Seoul Arts Centre Free Small Theatre	Jan 19 – Mar 5	
2011	Mother's Song	어머니의 노래	Mother	Arko Arts Theater Grand Theater	Aug 22–24	
2011	Mother's Song	어머니의 노래	Mother	Incheon Culture and Arts Center Main Performance Hall	Oct 19–20	
2017–2018	Billy Elliot	빌리 엘리어트	Billy's Grandma	Daesung D Cube Art Center	Nov 28 – May 7	
2021–2022	Billy Elliot	빌리 엘리어트	Billy's Grandma	Daesung D Cube Art Center	Aug 31 – Feb 13	

=== Theater ===
Theater plays performances
Year	Title		Role	Theater	Date	Ref.
Year	English	Korean	Role	Theater	Date	Ref.
1962	Phèdre	페드라	Panov			
1963	The House of Bernarda Alba	베르나르다 알바의 집	Maria Josefa	National Theatre (Myeongdong)		
1964	Blood Wedding	피의 결혼	Mother	National Theatre (Myeongdong)		
1965	Evil Spirit	악령				
1965	Faust	파우스트				
1966	The Feast of the Followers	따라지의 향연(饗宴)	Concetta	National Theatre (Myeongdong)	June 16–19	
1966	Agent of God	신의 대리인		National Theatre (Myeongdong)	Nov 17–21	
1967	Haenyeo Come Ashore	해녀 뭍에 오르다	Haenyeo	National Theatre (Myeongdong)	Apr 28 – May 4	
1968	Operation Picnic	픽크닉 작전		National Theatre (Myeongdong)	April 9–14	
1968	Murder Fantasia	살인환상곡		National Theatre (Myeongdong)	Oct 26–30	
1969	La Cantatrice Chauve	대머리 여가수	Echo	Café Teatre (the first small theater in Korea, 24-1 Chungmuro 1-ga)	April	
1969	Friendship	우정	Sushi Couple (female)	Café Teatre (the first small theater in Korea, 24-1 Chungmuro 1-ga)	April	
1969	Sunny morning	햇빛 밝은 아침		Café Teatre (the first small theater in Korea, 24-1 Chungmuro 1-ga)	April	
1969	Marius	마리우스		National Theatre (Myeongdong)	Jun 12–16	
1969	Passing for Black	흑인 창녀를 위한 고백	Nancy Manigo	National Theatre (Myeongdong)	Sep 17–21	
1970	Medal of the Lion	사자의 훈장		National Theatre (Myeongdong)	Feb 20–26	
1970	Forest Fire	산불	Byeong-gyeok's Wife	National Theatre (Myeongdong)	Jun 26 – Jul 1	
1970	Where and How Shall We meet?	어디서 무엇이 되어 만나랴	Ondal's mother	National Theatre (Myeongdong)	Nov 18–22	
1971	The School for Wives	아가씨 길들이기		National Theatre (Myeongdong)	March 9–14	
1971	Women in the Net	그물안의 여인들		National Theatre (Myeongdong)	May 26–30	
1971	The Ballad of the Sad Café	슬픈 까페의 노래	Amelia Evans	National Theatre (Myeongdong)	Sep 2–6	
1972	Fantasy Travel	환상여행	Yoon Geum-bong	National Theatre (Myeongdong)	Feb 1–7	
1972	The Feast of the Followers	따라지의 향연(饗宴)	Concetta	National Theatre (Myeongdong)	Sep 14–18	
1973	Cat on a Hot Tin Roof	뜨거운 양철지붕위의 고양이		Art Theater	Dec 20–24	
1974	Leather Beoseon	가죽버선		Korea Culture and Arts Foundation Theater Hall	July 5–7	
1974	The Legend of a River that Doesn't Flow	흐르지 않는 강의 전설		Unsul Theater	Oct 10–14	
1975	Faust	파우스트		Myeongdong Arts Center	June 5–6	
1975	Woman and Suin	여인과 수인	Woman	Myeongdong Arts Center	July 9–14	
1976	Tango in Your Pocket	주머니속에서 탱고를	Malt	Civic Center Annex	June 17–21	
1978	Passing for Black	흑인 창녀를 위한 고백	Nancy Manigo	Theatre Hall Sesil Theatre	Feb 15–21	
1978	The Bald Soprano - 100th episode	대머리 여가수 - 100회째	Echo	Theatre Hall Sesil Theatre	May 31 – Jun 6	
1978	What Will Becomes?	무엇이 될고하니		Theatre Hall Sesil Theatre	Oct 27 – Nov 1	
1978	The Bald Soprano	대머리 여가수	Echo	El Canto Arts Theater	Dec 14–31	
1979	That Woman Catches Someone	그 여자 사람 잡네		El Canto Arts Theater	Feb 13 – March 4	
1980	Baekyang Island's Desire	백양섬의 욕망	Bia	El Canto Arts Theater	Feb 17 – March 13	
1982	Blood Wedding	피의 결혼	Mother	Culture and Arts Center Grand Theater	June 1 – July 12	
1982	Evening Primrose	달맞이꽃		National Theater Small Theater	June 11–16	
1983	Blood Wedding	피의 결혼	Mother	Culture and Arts Center Grand Theater	May 3–9	
1984	Flowers Bloom Even on Windy Days	바람부는 날에도 꽃은 피네		Munyae Theater Seoul	Feb 16–22	
1984	Blood Wedding; Flowers Bloom Even on Windy Days	피의 결혼 바람부는 날에도 꽃은 피네	Mother	Cultural Center-Seoul	June 1 – July 12	
1984	Blood Wedding; Flowers Bloom Even on Windy Days	피의 결혼 바람부는 날에도 꽃은 피네	Mother	National Theater-Seoul	June 1 – July 12	
1984	Blood Wedding; Flowers Bloom Even on Windy Days	피의 결혼 바람부는 날에도 꽃은 피네	Mother	Theater des Nations, Nancy, Epinal, Metz	June 1 – July 12	
1984	Blood Wedding; Flowers Bloom Even on Windy Days	피의 결혼 바람부는 날에도 꽃은 피네	Mother	Maison des Cultures du Monde, Paris	June 1 – July 12	
1984	Blood Wedding; Flowers Bloom Even on Windy Days	피의 결혼 바람부는 날에도 꽃은 피네	Mother	Festival International du Theater Hamamett, Tunisie	June 1 – July 12	
1984	Blood Wedding; Flowers Bloom Even on Windy Days	피의 결혼 바람부는 날에도 꽃은 피네	Mother	Festival International du Theater, Asti, Italy	June 1 – July 12	
1984	Flowers Bloom Even on Windy Days	바람부는 날에도 꽃은 피네	Mother	Literary Theater	June 1–18	
1984	Flowers Bloom Even on Windy Days	바람부는 날에도 꽃은 피네	Mother	Theater des Nations, Nancy, Epinal, Metz	June 18–22	
1984	Flowers Bloom Even on Windy Days	바람부는 날에도 꽃은 피네	Mother	Maison des Cultures du Monde, Paris	June 24–27	
1984	Flowers Bloom Even on Windy Days	바람부는 날에도 꽃은 피네	Mother	Festival International du Theater Hamamett, Tunisie	July 1–6	
1984	Flowers Bloom Even on Windy Days	바람부는 날에도 꽃은 피네	Mother	Festival International du Theater, Asti, Italy	July 9–12	
1985	Blood Wedding	피의 결혼	Mother	Calazon Theater Festival in France		
1985	Blood Wedding	피의 결혼	Mother	Barcelona Theater Festival in Spain		
1985	Flowers Bloom Even on Windy Days	바람부는 날에도 꽃은 피네	Mother	Munyae Theater Seoul	June 12–15	
1985	Flowers Bloom Even on Windy Days	바람부는 날에도 꽃은 피네	Mother	Japan	June 16–20	
1985	Flowers Bloom Even on Windy Days	바람부는 날에도 꽃은 피네	Mother	Barcelona Theater Festival in Spain	June 16–20	
1985	Flowers Bloom Even on Windy Days	바람부는 날에도 꽃은 피네	Mother	Calazon Theater Festival in France	June 16–20	
1985	A Country as Far Away as the Sky	하늘만큼 먼 나라		Culture and Arts Center Grand Theater	Sep 12–17	
1985	A Country as Far Away as the Sky	하늘만큼 먼 나라		Culture and Arts Center Grand Theater	Oct 20	
1985	Egg	달걀	Margis (second wife)	Culture and Art Hall Small Theater	Oct 18–31	
1986	Women in Crisis	위기의 여자	Monique	Small Theater Sanullim	April 1–30	
1986	Where and How Shall We meet?	어디서 무엇이 되어 만나랴	Ondal's mother	Culture and Art Hall Grand Theater	Oct 8–12	
1986	Where and How Shall We meet?	어디서 무엇이 되어 만나랴	Ondal's mother	Jeonbuk Student Centre	Nov 5	
1987	Impossible Impossible	불가불가	actor in the play	Culture and Art Hall Small Theater	Sep 7 – Oct 3	
1988	If the Rooster Doesn't Crow, Even a Hen	수탉이 안 울면 암탉이라도		Culture and Art Hall Small Theater	May 4–10	
1988	Blood Wedding	피의 결혼	Mother	Culture and Art Hall Small Theater	Aug 27 – Sep 5	
1988	Blood Wedding	(1988) 문화예술축전 서울국제연극제; 피의 결혼	Mother	Wonju KBS Public Hall	Oct 15–28	
1989	Defeating the Mount Geumgang Tiger	금강산 호랑이 물리치기	Korean dance instructor	Culture and Art Hall Small Theater	Aug 13–16	
1989	Thieves' Carnival	도적들의 무도회		Ho-am Art Hall	Oct 20–29	
1990	'night, Mother	굿나잇, 마더	Selma Cates (Mother)		Feb 6 – March 10	
1990	Thieves' Carnival	도적들의 무도회		Lotte World Arts Theater	March 3–17	
1990	The House of Bernarda Alba	베르나르다 알바의 집	Bernarda Alba	National Theater Small Theater	April 5–19	
1990	Chuseok is Bright and Sweet	한가위 밝은 달아	Mother	Culture and Art Hall Grand Theater	Sep 1–6	
1990	The Bald Soprano	대머리 여가수	Echo	Culture and Art Hall Small Theater	Oct 5–18	
1991	The Feast of the Followers	따라지의 향연(饗宴)	Echo	Grand Theater of the Arts Center	Feb 1–7	
1991–1992	Mom Discovered the Sea When She Was Fifty	엄마는 오십에 바다를 발견했다	Mother	Small Theater Sanullim	Dec 24 – Feb 9	
1992	Agnes of God	신의 아그네스	Director Miriam	Small Theater Sanullim	April 4–19	
1993	Hamlet	햄릿	Clown	the Jayu Theater Company	March 13–21	
1993	Hamlet	햄릿	Clown	France's Rollpoint Theater	April	
1993	Hiroshima My Love	내사랑 히로시마	Female	Hyundai ToArt Hall	Oct 13 – Nov 21	
1994	What happened to that sister?	그 자매에게 무슨 일이 일어났나?	Jane Hutson	Hakjeon Small Theater	Feb 24 – March 31	
1994	Shaman Island	무녀도	Shaman	Seoul Arts Center CJ Towol Theater	July 2–17	
1994	Park Jung-ja's November Waltz	박정자의 11월의 왈츠		Experimental Theater in Apgujeong-dong	Oct 27	
1995	Blood Wedding	피의 결혼	Mother	Seoul Arts Center Jayu Theater	May 13–21	
1995	Blood Wedding	피의 결혼	Mother	Sambaek Theater in Tokyo, Japan	June 7–11	
1995	Blood Wedding	피의 결혼	Mother	Wilshire Ebell Theater in LA, USA	June 13–14	
1995	Blood Wedding	피의 결혼	Mother	Caracas World Theater Festival in Venezuela	June 23–25	
1995–1996	Teresa's dream	테레사의 꿈	Teresa	Small Theater Sanullim	Dec 1 – Feb 4	
1996	The Feast of the Followers	따라지의 향연	Concetta	Yonkang Hall	Mar 10 – Jun 16	
1997	The woman, the strong mother	그 여자 억척어멈	Mother	Academic Blue	April 8 – July 6	
1998	Citizen's Theater - Special Feature: Korean Ahn Jung-geun	시민연극 - 특집·대한국인 안중근	Jo Maria	Culture and Arts Center Grand Theater	Oct 2–3	
1998	Mom Discovered the Sea When She Was Fifty	(제1회) 엄마는 오십에 바다를 발견했다	Mother	Naju Dongshin University	Oct 28 – Nov 2	
1998	Mom Discovered the Sea When She Was Fifty	(제1회) 엄마는 오십에 바다를 발견했다	Mother	Namdo Culture and Arts Center	Oct 28 – Nov 2	
1998	A Story of Success	출세기2	Park Jeong-ja	Daehakro Arts Center Grand Theater	Dec 12–20	
1999	Mom Discovered the Sea When She Was Fifty	엄마는 오십에 바다를 발견했다	Mother	Small Theater Sanullim	Jan 21 – March 28	
1999	Phèdre	페드라	Phèdre	Small theater of Daehakro Arts Center in Seoul.	June 1–27	
1999	(23rd) Seoul Theater Festival: Lee Byung-bok's Ot-Gut - Sal	(제23회) 서울연극제 : 이병복의 옷굿 - 살	Ophelia	Culture and Arts Center Grand Theater	Oct 2–3	
1999	Lee Byung-bok's Ot-Gut - Sal	이병복의 옷굿 - 살	Ophelia	Culture and Arts Center Grand Theater	Oct 2–3	
1999	The Bald Soprano	대머리 여가수	Echo	Human Theater	Oct 22 – Nov 28	

=== Theater (2000–present) ===
Theater plays performances
Year	Title		Role	Theater	Date	Ref.
Year	English	Korean	Role	Theater	Date	Ref.
2003	19 and 80	19 그리고 80	Maude	Jeongmiso, Daehak-ro Installation Theatre	Jan 9 – April 20	
2003	Mom Discovered the Sea When She Was Fifty	엄마는 오십에 바다를 발견했다	Mother	Sanullim Small Theater	Sep 25 – Nov 23	
2004	19 and 80	19 그리고 80	Maude	Jeongmiso, Daehak-ro Installation Theatre	Jan 9 – April 29	
2004	Blood Wedding	피의 결혼	Mother	Dongsung Hall of the Dongsung Art Center in Daehakro, Seoul	Dec 3–31	
2005	Woodangtangtang, Grandma's Room	우당탕탕, 할머니의 방	Grandma	National Jeongdong Theatre (Seoul)	April 15 – May 15	
2005	Mom Discovered the Sea When She Was Fifty	엄마는 오십에 바다를 발견했다	Mother	Sanullim Small Theater	Aug 2 – Sep 25	
2005	Woodangtangtang, Grandma's Room	우당탕탕, 할머니의 방	Grandma	Seongnam Arts Center Ensemble Theater	October 27–30	
2006	19 and 80	19 그리고 80	Maude	Woorim Cheongdam Theatre	Jan 9 – Feb 19	
2006	The feast of the following: original title Miseria e nobiltà	따라지의 향연:원제 Miseria e nobiltà	Biase	Arko Grand Theater in Dongsung-dong, Daehakro, Seoul	Jun 28 – July 9	
2006	Mom Discovered the Sea When She Was Fifty	엄마는 오십에 바다를 발견했다	Mother	Sanullim Small Theater	July 25 – Aug 27	
2007	Agnes of God	신의 아그네스	Mother Miriam Ruth (Anna Maria Burchetti)	National Jeongdong Theatre Seoul	Jan 9 – Feb 7	
2007	Agnes of God	신의 아그네스	Mother Miriam Ruth (Anna Maria Burchetti)	Seongnam Art Center	March 2–4	
2007	Mom Discovered the Sea When She Was Fifty	엄마는 오십에 바다를 발견했다	Mother	Sanullim Small Theater	April 12 – May 27	
2007	Agnes of God	신의 아그네스	Mother Miriam Ruth (Anna Maria Burchetti)	Seoul Arts Center Jayu Small Theater	Dec 8–30	
2008	Agarwood	침향 (沈香)	Old mother	Arko Arts Theatre Grand Theatre	June 11–29	
2009	Mom Discovered the Sea When She Was Fifty	엄마는 오십에 바다를 발견했다	Mother	Sanullim Small Theater	May 7 – Jun 6	
2009	Where and What to Meet	어디서 무엇이 되어 만나랴	Ondal's mother	Myeongdong Arts Theatre	July 10–26	
2009	Mom Discovered the Sea When She Was Fifty	엄마는 오십에 바다를 발견했다	Mother	Pyeongchon Art Hall	Oct 29–31	
2010	Mom Discovered the Sea When She Was Fifty	엄마는 오십에 바다를 발견했다	Mother	Sanullim Small Theater	May	
2010	I Am You	나는 너다	Maria Jo	National Theater Sky Theater	July 21 – August 22	
2011	Oedipus	오이디푸스	Dysart	Myeongdong Arts Center	January 20 – February 13	
2011	I Am You	나는 너다	Maria Jo	Seoul Arts Center CJ Towol Theater	May 17 – June 6	
2011	I Am You	나는 너다	Maria Jo	Jeju Art Center	June 24–25	
2011	World National Theater Festival - Sand Station	모래의 정거장		National Theater KB Youth Sky Theater	Oct 7–8	
2011	Sand Station	모래의 정거장		Busan LIG Art Hall	Oct 15–16	
2011	Sand Station	모래의 정거장		National Theater Company Baek Seong-hee and Jang Min-ho Theater	Oct 22–23	
2011	Oedipus	오이디푸스	Dysart	Myeongdong Arts Center	November 8–27	
2012	19 and 80	19 그리고 80	Maude	Samil-ro Warehouse Theater	Dec 14–30	
2013	Antigone	안티고네	Tyresias Beater	Seoul Arts Center CJ Towol Theater	April 15–28	
2013	Chekhov in 14 — Swansong	14인 체홉 — 백조의 노래	Vasily Vasilyevich Svetlovidov	Project box view	June 18 – July 7	
2013	Chekhov in 14 — Swansong	14인 체홉 — 백조의 노래	Vasily Vasilyevich Svetlovidov	Daehakro Arts Theater Small Theater	Aug 17–22	
2013	Dante's New Song	단테의 신곡	Francesca	National Theater of Korea Haeoreum Theater	Nov 2–9	
2014	Eternal Goodbye Spirit Goodbye	영영이별 영이별	Queen Jeongsun	Gangdong Arts Center Small Theater Dream	Feb 21	
2014	Dante's New Song	단테의 신곡	Francesca	National Theater Haeoreum Theater	Oct 31 – Nov 8	
2015	Harold and Maude	해롤드 & 모드	Maude	National Theatre Daloreum Theatre	Jan 9 – Mar 1	
2015	Forever Farewell, Forever Farewell	영영이별 영이별	Queen Jeongsun	Sanullim Small Theater	July 16–26	
2015	The 1st Monodrama Festival: Forever Farewell, Forever Farewell	제1회 모노드라마 페스티벌	Queen Jeongsun	Namhansanseong Art Hall Small Theatre	September 11	
2015	Three Tall Women	키 큰 세 여자	A	Myeongdong Arts Theatre	October 3–25	
2016	Hamlet	햄릿	Actor 2	National Theater Haeoreum Theater	July 12 – August 7	
2017	Forever Farewell, Forever Farewell	영영이별 영이별	Queen Jeongsun	Asian Culture Centre Theatre 1	May 27–28	
2017	The Story of Three Women - Gangneung	세 여자 이야기－강릉	Women	Myeongju Art Madang	June 3–8	
2017	Forever Farewell, Forever Farewell	영영이별 영이별	Queen Jeongsun	Munhwa Station Seoul 284 3rd class waiting room	June 15–16	
2018	Forever Farewell, Forever Farewell	영영이별 영이별	Queen Jeongsun	main auditorium of Government Complex Building 6 at Sejong Government Complex	Feb 27	
2018	The Andersen's fairy tale play "Mother's Story"	안데르센 동화연극 "엄마 이야기"	Mother	Gwangmyeong	November	
2019	In My Dream, I Was Tender	꿈속에선 다정하였네	Lady Hyegyeonggung	Guro Art Valley Arts Theatre	March 21–23	
2019	Forever Farewell, Forever Farewell	영영 이별 영 이별	Queen Jeongsun	JCC Art Centre Concert Hall	April 13	
2019	The drama concert of actress Park Jeong-ja, titled "In My Dream, I Was Tender"	연극배우 박정자의 드라마 콘서트 "꿈속에선 다정하였네"	Lady Hyegyeonggung	Jeongmiso, an installation theatre	March 2–12	
2019	The drama concert of actress Park Jeong-ja, titled "In My Dream, I Was Tender"	연극배우 박정자의 드라마 콘서트 "꿈속에선 다정하였네"	Lady Hyegyeonggung	Ewha Womans University Samsung Hall	December 5	
2021	Harold and Maude	해롤드 & 모드	Maude	Daechi Art Hall, KT&G Sangsang Madang, Daechi-dong, Gangnam District, Seoul	May 1 to 23	
2021	In My Dream, I Was Tender	꿈속에선 다정하였네	Lady Hyegyeonggung	Ansan Arts Center	May 29	
2022	Merry Christmas, Mom	메리크리스마스, 엄마	Son	JTN Art Hall 1	February 24–27	
2022	Hamlet	햄릿	Actor 2	National Theater Haeoreum Theater	July 13–August 13	
2022	In My Dream, I Was Tender	꿈속에선 다정하였네	Lady Hyegyeonggung	Incheon Three Bowl	Sep 28	
2022	In My Dream, I Was Tender	꿈속에선 다정하였네	Lady Hyegyeonggung	National Theater Daloreum Theater	Oct 26	
2022	Love Letter	러브레터	Melissa	Seoul Arts Center Jayu Theater	Oct 6 – Nov 13	
2023	Jangsu Store	장수상회	Im Geum-nim	Doosan Art Center Yonkang Hall	April 21 – May 21	
2023	Jangsu Store	장수상회	Im Geum-nim	Jeju Arts Center Grand Theater	July 15	
2023	Jangsu Store	장수상회	Im Geum-nim	Incheon Art Hall Grand Performance Hall	Dec 8–9	

== Accolades ==
=== Awards and nominations ===
Award and nomination received
Year	Award ceremony	Category	Nominee / Work	Result	Ref.
1970	6th Baeksang Arts Awards	Best Actress Award — Theater	Passing for Black	Won	
1970–1971	7th Dong-A Theatre Award	Best Actress	Where and How Shall We meet?	Won	
1972	8th Baeksang Arts Awards	Grand Prize — Theater	The Ballad of the Sad Café	Won	
1975	1st Younghee Theater Award	Best Actress	Park Jeong-ja	Won	
1975	14th Grand Bell Awards	Best Supporting Actress	Promise of the Flesh	Won	
1984	23rd Grand Bell Award	Best Supporting Actress	The MA-NIM	Won	
1985–1986	22nd Dong-A Theatre Award	Best Actress Award	Jayu Theater's play "Egg" and Sanullim's play "As Far as the Sky"	Won	
1986	8th Seoul Dramatic Evaluation Group Award	Best Actress Award	Jayu Theater's play "Egg" and Sanullim's play "As Far as the Sky"	Won	
1986–1987	23rd Dong-A Theatre Award	Best Actress Award	Sanullim's play Woman in Crisis	Won	
1987	23rd Baeksang Arts Awards	Best Actress Award in Theatre	Sanullim's play Woman in Crisis	Won	
1987	9th Seoul Dramatic Evaluation Group Award	Best Actress Award in Theatre	Sanullim's play Woman in Crisis	Won	
1988	Korean Theater Arts Award	Best Actress Award in Theatre	Blood Marriage	Won	
1989	25th Baeksang Arts Awards	Popularity Award — Theatre	Blood Marriage	Won	
1990	26th Baeksang Arts Awards	Theatre Grand Prize	'night, Mother	Won	
1990	26th Baeksang Arts Awards	Best Actress Award	'night, Mother	Won	
1991	Seoul Theater Festival	Best Actress Award	Mom Discovered the Sea at 50	Won	
1991	Love Play Festival	Best Actress Award	Mom Discovered the Sea at 50	Won	
1997	7th Lee Hae-rang Theatre Award	Theatre Award	Park Jeong-ja	Won	
2000	Ewha Womans University Department of Media and Public Relations Film Award	Proud Media and Public Relations Video Award	Park Jeong-ja	Won	
2001	Jinmyeong Girls' High School Alumni Association	Proud Jinmyeong Impression Award	Park Jeong-ja	Won	
2001	MBC Hall of Fame	Theatre Artist Award	Park Jeong-ja	Won	
2005	14th Seoul Children's Theater Awards	Best Actress Award	You Are Special	Won	
2011	Korea Theater Award	4th Special Award	Park Jeong-ja	Won	
2012	Paradise Awards (Note: The Paradise Award, sponsored by Paradise Group, is a combination of the 2003 'Woo-kyung Welfare Award' of the Paradise Welfare Foundation and the 'Woo-kyung Culture and Arts Award' of the Paradise Cultural Foundation.)	8th Culture and Arts Category	Park Jeong-ja	Won	
2013	Samsung Happiness Awards (Note: Samsung Happiness Awards is organized by Samsung Life Public Welfare Foundation.)	Women's Creation Award	Park Jeong-ja	Won	
2016	Shining Ewha	Impression Award	Park Jeong-ja	Won	
2014	4th Beautiful Artist Award (Note: The Beautiful Artist Award Theater Artist Award is hosted by Shin Young-kyun Culture and Arts Foundation since 2011.)	Theatre Artist Award	Park Jeong-ja	Won	
2020	7th E-Daily Culture Awards	Achievement Award	Park Jeong-ja	Won	
2020	3·1 Culture Award for Art		Park Jeong-ja	Won	
2023	21st Proud Ewha People		Park Jeong-ja	Won	

=== State honors ===
Name of country, award ceremony, year given, and name of honor
Country	Award Ceremony	Year	Honor	Ref.
Seoul Metropolitan City	Seoul Metropolitan City Cultural Award	1998	Cultural Award — Theater	
South Korea	Culture Day Ceremony	2007	Bogwan Order of Cultural Merit	

=== Listicle ===
Name of publisher, year listed, name of listicle, and placement
Publisher	Year	List	Placement	Ref.
Dong-a Ilbo	2003	Plays and Musicals – Best Actress	1st	
Asia Today	2013	Actors in their 60s and 70s who dominate the theater stage	Top 3	
Book & People (written by Jang Won-jae)	2015	Who is an actor	Top 15	
Korean Theater (Note: Jeong Jin-soo, a theater director and former professor at Sungkyunkwan University and the head of the People's Theater Company, says about those who represent Korean theater. Representative Jeong collects the lives of 34 leading Korean theater artists and publishes 'The Life of a Theater Artist - A Biography of Korea's Representative Theater Artists.' The book is a compilation of interviews with 34 theater artists from the content serialized by the author in the magazine 'Korean Theater'.)	2019	34 Leading Korean Theater Artist	Top 34	
