= Facing Ali =

- DVD cover
- Directed by: Pete McCormack
- Produced by: Derik Murray
- Starring: Muhammad Ali (archive); George Chuvalo; Sir Henry Cooper; Howard Cosell (archive); George Foreman; Joe Frazier; Larry Holmes; Sonny Liston (archive); Ron Lyle; Ken Norton; Earnie Shavers; Leon Spinks; Ernie Terrell; Malcolm X (archive)
- Edited by: Jesse James Miller
- Music by: Schaun Tozer
- Release date: May 29, 2009 (SIFF)
- Running time: 100 minutes
- Country: United States
- Language: English

Facing Ali is a 2009 documentary directed by Pete McCormack about Muhammad Ali (born Cassius Marcellus Clay Jr. in Louisville, Kentucky) as told from the perspectives of ten opponents he faced during his career: George Chuvalo, Sir Henry Cooper, George Foreman, "Smokin'" Joe Frazier, Larry Holmes (also a former sparring partner of Ali), Ron Lyle, Ken Norton, Earnie Shavers, Leon Spinks and Ernie Terrell.

Production is credited to Canadian producer Derik Murray and his company, Network Entertainment, and to Lions Gate Entertainment and Spike Sports in association with Muhammad Ali Enterprises.

The fighters discuss their bouts against Muhammad Ali as well as their own lives and careers; Ali's fights against other opponents; his conversion to Islam and the assumption of the name Muhammad Ali; his relationship with the Nation of Islam organization (frequently referred to as the "black Muslims"), its leader, Elijah Muhammad (who bestowed Ali with his new name after he was briefly called Cassius X), and the Nation of Islam's most prominent minister, Malcolm X; Ali's refusal to be inducted into the United States Army to serve in the ongoing Vietnam War in 1967 on moral and religious grounds; the decision by the New York State Athletic Commission to strip him of his championship; his legal case and his reinstatement after the favorable June 28, 1970 decision by the Supreme Court of the United States. The Justices decided 8–0 (with Thurgood Marshall abstaining), that "... for the reasons stated, that the Department [of Justice] was simply wrong as a matter of law in advising that the petitioner's beliefs were not religiously based and were not sincerely held".

Sonny Liston, who died in 1970, appears in archival footage. Liston and Ali fought in two notable matches in 1964 and 1965, respectively. The cover art for the DVD is Neil Leifer's iconic photograph from their controversial second fight in Lewiston, Maine in which many, such as George Chuvalo, allege that Sonny Liston deliberately lost.

== Muhammad Ali's present medical condition ==
Former British champion Sir Henry Cooper briefly discusses the cumulative effects of boxing on Muhammad Ali's health. He states that Ali actually has "Parkinson's syndrome" rather than Parkinson's disease and that Ali's doctor had personally told him that the cause was Ali taking frequent punches to the back of his neck, and that these blows killed brain cells which trigger the release of an important chemical. George Chuvalo stated that he believes Ali's condition was caused either by boxing and or a predisposition for the disease.

== Awards ==
Although eligible for nomination for an Academy Award in the documentary feature category, it was not so honored. However, it won awards at the Vancouver Film Critics Circle and the Vancouver International Film Festival.

== DVD fault ==
Some copies of the UK DVD release ARTF0158 have the disc chapters playing out of sequence, together with chapter selections which begin during a chapter, sections which are repeated and even one section which is missing altogether.

== See also ==
- List of boxing films
