= Plague City: SARS in Toronto =

- Written by: Collin Friesen; Pete McCormack
- Directed by: David Wu
- Starring: Kari Matchett; Ron White; Rick Roberts
- Music by: Lawrence Shragge
- Country of origin: Canada
- Original language: English

Production
- Producer: Wendy Grean
- Cinematography: David Herrington
- Editor: David Wu
- Running time: 93 minutes
- Production companies: Lionsgate Television; Slanted Wheel Entertainment

Original release
- Network: CTV
- Release: May 29, 2005

Plague City: SARS in Toronto is a 2005 medical thriller television movie directed by David Wu, set during the 2003 outbreak of severe acute respiratory syndrome (SARS) in Toronto. The locations and characters were composite characters or fictionalized versions of actual Toronto medical personnel and facilities.

Produced by CTV as part of its "Signature Series" of television films dramatizing significant Canadian news stories, it was filmed in Toronto and Hamilton. It was written by Collin Friesen and Pete McCormack.

The film aired on May 29, 2005, on CTV.

== Cast ==
- Kari Matchett as Amy
- Ron White as Dr. Royce
- Rick Roberts as Dr. Jeremy Neville
- Lannette New as Rosie
- Rahnuma Panthaky as Laura Weston
- Merwin Mondesir as Rob Connell
- George Chiang as Tom Kwan
- Brian Markinson
- James Gallanders
- Leslie Carlson
- Alina Lee as Rosie's Mother
- Grace Lynn Kung as April
- James McGowan as Ed
- Grahame Wood as Paul

== Critical response ==
John Doyle of The Globe and Mail wrote that the film "is in some ways, absurdly ambitious. It tries to capture an entire city's plight while sticking to the facts. It has many mundane TV-movie moments, but it's a grimly compelling production."

== Awards ==
Award	Date of ceremony	Category	Nominees	Result	Reference
Directors Guild of Canada	2006	Outstanding Direction - Television Movie/Mini-Series	David Wu	Nominated	
Directors Guild of Canada	2006	Outstanding Sound Editing - Television Movie/Mini-Series	Richard Calistan, Rob Hegedus, Kevin Howard	Nominated	
Gemini Awards	November 4, 2006	Best Photography in a Dramatic Program or Series	David Herrington	Nominated	
