= I Am Bruce Lee =

- Directed by: Pete McCormack
- Written by: Pete McCormack
- Produced by: Derik Murray; John Barbisan
- Release date: February 9, 2012
- Country: United States
- Language: English

I Am Bruce Lee is a 2012 American documentary film directed and written by Pete McCormack. The film documents the life of Bruce Lee, the famous actor and martial artist, featuring interviews with his widow Linda Emery, and daughter, Shannon Lee. It won a Leo Award in 2012.

== Reception ==
On Rotten Tomatoes, the film has an aggregate score of 75% based on 9 positive and 3 negative critic reviews.
