= Gina Chiarelli =

Canadian actress

Gina Chiarelli is a Canadian actress. Most associated with stage roles in Vancouver, British Columbia, she received a Genie Award nomination as Best Actress at the 26th Genie Awards in 2006 for her performance in the film See Grace Fly.

== Early life and education ==
Chiarelli was raised in East Africa while her parents were working as missionaries. She moved to Ontario at age 11 and later attended a boarding school. She graduated from the New School of Drama in Toronto and moved to Vancouver in 1989.

== Career ==
As a stage actress, Chiarelli won a Jessie Richardson Theatre Award in 1999 for her performance in Agnes of God, in 2006 for The Diary of Anne Frank, and in 2013 for Master Class. She has also had recurring roles in the television series Cold Squad, Da Vinci's Inquest and The Dead Zone, and appeared in the films Noroc, Deadly Little Secrets and Numb.

== Filmography ==
=== Film ===
Year	Title	Role	Notes
1993	Look Who's Talking Now	Young Rosie	
1999	Noroc	Halina	
2000	Beautiful Joe	Pauline	
2000	Trixie	Casino Security	
2000	Cinderella; Single Again	Drewcella	
2001	Lola	Boutique Owner	
2002	Deadly Little Secrets	Interrogator	
2003	Little Brother of War	Maria	
2003	See Grace Fly	Grace	Also producer
2008	Another Cinderella Story	Paula Pinella	
2010	Guido Superstar: The Rise of Guido	Acting Teacher	
2015	Numb	Officer Stevens	
2017	Hollow in the Land	Helen Balkoff	
2017	Prodigals	Anita	

=== Television ===
Year	Title	Role	Notes
1997	Millennium	Killean Marie Haskell	Episode: "The Wild and the Innocent"
1997	Police Academy: The Series	Maria	Episode: "Dead Man Talking"
1997, 2000	The Outer Limits	Eileen Bowman / Doctor #2	2 episodes
1998	Every Mother's Worst Fear	Travel Manager	Television film
1998	Night Man	Woman	Episode: "The People's Choice"
1998	The Net	Agent Mary Ann Hubble	Episode: "Lucy's Life"
1999	Two of Hearts	Linda	Television film
1999	Hope Island	Sheila Matthews	Episode: "Batten Down the Hatches"
1999–2000	Cold Squad	Tina Coscarella	4 episodes
1999–2001	You, Me and the Kids	Sharon	5 episodes
2001	Mysterious Ways	Madeline	Episode: "Wonderful"
2001	The Miracle of the Cards	Radiographer	Television film
2001–2003	Da Vinci's Inquest	Gina Otaviani	4 episodes
2002	The Dead Zone	Nurse Elaine MacGowan	3 episodes
2006	Cries in the Dark	Rosa	Television film
2007	Jeff Ltd.	Interrogator	2 episodes
2007	Masters of Science Fiction	Allison	Episode: "The Discarded"
2009	The L Word	Dr. Mandy	Episode: "Least Likely"
2009	Do You Know Me?	Tina Marsaretti	Television film
2009–2010	Riese: Kingdom Falling	Cacilia	5 episodes
2010	Shattered	Irene Stanwood	Episode: "Sound of a Strap"
2011	Hunt for the I-5 Killer	Brostowicz	Television film
2011, 2013	The True Heroines	Doris Worthington	3 episodes
2012	The Killing	Nurse Ellen	Episode: "72 Hours"
2015	Supernatural	Susie	Episode: "Angel Heart"
2016	Bates Motel	O'Sullivan	Episode: "There's No Place Like Home"
2018	All of My Heart: The Wedding	Florist	Television film
