= See Grace Fly =

2003 film directed by Pete McCormack

- Film poster
- Directed by: Pete McCormack
- Written by: Pete McCormack
- Produced by: Pete McCormack; Paul McGillion; Gina Chiarelli
- Starring: Gina Chiarelli; Paul McGillion; Tom Scholte; Benjamin Ratner; Jennifer Copping; Megan Leitch
- Cinematography: Larry Lynn
- Edited by: Jesse James Miller
- Music by: Dennis Burke
- Release dates: September 1, 2003 (Montréal World Film Festival); December 3, 2004
- Running time: 91 minutes
- Country: Canada
- Budget: CA$63,000

See Grace Fly is a 2003 independent film directed and written by Pete McCormack and starring Gina Chiarelli and Paul McGillion.

== Plot ==
Grace McKinley is a brilliant 38-year-old woman with schizophrenia. When her mother dies, Grace's actions become increasingly erratic. She takes two weeks to report the death, and in that time is sent a shattering message that only she can decipher.

Grace's younger brother Dominic is a repressed yet courageous missionary working in war-ravaged Sierra Leone. Called home to arrange his mother's funeral, he is at the same time forced to deal with Grace's uncertain future and their forgotten past. The problem is, wanted by the police for questioning, and with her life threatened, Grace has disappeared onto the streets of Vancouver, fuelled by an indomitable will to spread her secret to the masses.

Kate Wilkens — Dominic's past love interest and Grace's psychiatrist — and Dominic's childhood buddy James, a priest, combine with Grace's fiercely loyal best friend Gigi and her punchy husband Ralph to round out those searching for Grace. But in the days leading up to the funeral the question of who actually needs to be saved becomes less and less clear, and the truth of Grace's convictions threaten to shatter all Dominic's beliefs, and both of their lives, to where death may be the only way to freedom.

== Cast ==
- Gina Chiarelli as Grace McKinley
  - Tatiana Stellingwerff – Young Grace
- Paul McGillion as Dominic McKinley
  - Jackson-Day Washington – Young Dominic
- Jennifer Copping as Kate Wilkins
- Tom Scholte as Father James
- Benjamin Ratner as Ralph Devito
- Megan Leitch as Gigi Devito
- Frank Borg – Bubba Binski
- Garvin Cross – Walt
- Rick Dobran – Sammy
- Mike Dopud – Steve
- Matt Hill – Leo
- Michael Kopsa – Mr. McKinley
- Edith Lando – Connie
  - Marcy Goldberg – Young Connie
- David Lewis – Gerry
- David Lovgren – Terry
- Jade Shaw – Cheryl
- Matt Hill – school security guard
- Michael P. Northey – CBS security guard
- Wesley Salter – Chicken Boy
- Christopher Shyer – bloody-nosed transvestite
- Linden Banks – principal
- Brendan Beiser – funeral director

== Reception ==
=== Critical reception ===
Andrea Gill, in a brief review for The Globe and Mail, praised the film, noting a production budget of only CA$63,000 and stating that Gina Chiarelli's performance in particular was deserving of accolades. Liam Lacey, reviewing for the same publication, rated the film two and a half stars, pointing out the problems with the film's themes – specifically the concept of mental health, and schizophrenia in particular, being pushed as a potential avenue of spiritual communication rather than a medical issue. Lacey also noted the character Kate's comparison of science and religion and the use of her dialogue to make the comments about schizophrenia and God.

Dennis Harvey, reviewing for Variety, disliked the pacing, but approved of the film's story and the lead performances – though he found the film "interesting if not altogether successful". Other than the resolution of the film, Harvey mentioned no fault with the technical side of the film.

=== Accolades ===
The film received a special citation at the 2003 Vancouver International Film Festival for Best Feature Film, and Chiarelli won the Women in Film and Video Vancouver Artistic Merit Award. At Portugal's Fantasporto 2004, See Grace Fly won the audience award for Best Film. At the 2004 Leo Awards, Chiarelli won Best Performance by a Lead Female. The film also received nominations in eight other categories: Best Feature Length Drama; Best Overall Sound; Pete McCormack for Best Direction and Best Screenwriting; Paul McGillion for Best Lead Performance by a Male; Tom Scholte for Best Supporting Performance by a Male; Larry Lynn for Best Cinematography; and Dennis Burke for Best Musical Score.

Chiarelli also received a nomination at the 2006 Genie Awards for Best Performance by an Actress in a Leading Role.

Accolades for See Grace Fly
| Year | Ceremony | Award | Nominee | Result | Ref. |
|---|---|---|---|---|---|
| 2003 | Vancouver International Film Festival | Best Feature Film | —N/a | Special Citation | |
| 2003 | Vancouver International Film Festival | Women in Film and Video Vancouver Artistic Merit Award | Gina Chiarelli | Won | |
| 2004 | Fantasporto | Best Film, Audience Award | —N/a | Won | |
| 2004 | Leo Awards | Best Feature Length Drama | Pete McCormack; Paul McGillion; Gina Chiarelli; Paul Armstrong (producer); Jena Niquidet (producer); Robert French (producer) | Nominated | |
| 2004 | Leo Awards | Best Direction, Feature Length Drama | Pete McCormack | Nominated | |
| 2004 | Leo Awards | Best Screenwriting, Feature Length Drama | Pete McCormack | Nominated | |
| 2004 | Leo Awards | Best Cinematography, Feature Length Drama | Larry Lynn | Nominated | |
| 2004 | Leo Awards | Best Overall Sound | John Ritchie; Ken Biehl; Mario Loubert; Michael P. Keeping; Hennie Britton; Matt Gionet; Tony Gronick; Derick Cobden; Jo Rossi | Nominated | |
| 2004 | Leo Awards | Best Musical Score, Feature Length Drama | Dennis Burke | Nominated | |
| 2004 | Leo Awards | Best Supporting Performance by a Male, Feature Length Drama | Tom Scholte | Nominated | |
| 2004 | Leo Awards | Best Lead Performance by a Male, Feature Length Drama | Paul McGillion | Nominated | |
| 2004 | Leo Awards | Best Lead Performance by a Female, Feature Length Drama | Gina Chiarelli | Won | |
| 2006 | Genie Awards | Best Performance by an Actress in a Leading Role | Gina Chiarelli | Nominated | |
