= Sports on Fire =

Canadian television documentary series

- Genre: Sports documentary
- Created by: Pete McCormack
- Country of origin: Canada
- No. of seasons: 1
- No. of episodes: 6

Production
- Executive producers: Pete McCormack; Andrew Barnsley; Jeff Aghassi; Kimberly Arnott; Kevin Foley
- Production companies: Project 10 Productions; Two 4 The Money Media

Original release
- Network: HBO Canada
- Release: January 9 – February 13, 2015

Sports on Fire is a Canadian television documentary series, which aired on HBO Canada in 2015. Created and produced by Pete McCormack, the six-episode series explored the historical, political and social context of several important moments in sports history.

The series garnered a Canadian Screen Award nomination for Best Sports Program or Series at the 4th Canadian Screen Awards in 2016.

== Episodes ==
No.	Title	Directed by	Original release date
1	"A Cold War"	Pete McCormack	9 January 2015
1972 Summit Series
2	"Born on the Bottle"	Pete McCormack	16 January 2015
How running moonshine led to NASCAR
3	"Terrorlympics"	Pete McCormack	23 January 2015
1972 Munich Massacre
4	"She Runs Like a Man"	Pete McCormack	30 January 2015
Caster Semenya and gender testing of female athletes
5	"The Race for Race"	Pete McCormack	6 February 2015
Jesse Owens at the 1936 Summer Olympics
6	"All the Rage"	Pete McCormack	13 February 2015
Steroids in elite sport.
