= Numb (2015 film) =

- Directed by: Jason R. Goode
- Written by: Andre Harden
- Produced by: Dylan Jenkinson
- Starring: Jamie Bamber Marie Avgeropoulos Stefanie von Pfetten Aleks Paunovic
- Cinematography: Jan Kiesser
- Edited by: Kye Meechan
- Music by: Alain Mayrand
- Production companies: Hope of Glory Pictures, Jenkinson/Goode Productions
- Release date: October 2015 (Busan International Film Festival)
- Country: Canada

Numb is a 2015 Canadian thriller from director Jason R. Goode, and produced by Jenkinson/Goode Productions

== Plot ==
Husband and wife Will and Dawn have driven from their home in Vancouver to a distant town in pursuit of a job for Will. The couple have money troubles, are facing foreclosure on their home, and owe a debt to Dawn's unsympathetic father.

After Will fails to land the job, they start the long drive back home. In below-freezing conditions, they see two inadequately-dressed hitchhikers, siblings Lee and Cheryl, and give them a lift. Lee is friendly but Cheryl is hostile from the start; both make no secret of their shady past and moral ambiguity.

Night falls and Will, who is driving, is the only person awake in the car. Suddenly a man staggers into the path of the vehicle. Will narrowly avoids a collision by braking sharply. The man turns out to be severely hypothermic; he is ushered into the car and an ambulance is called but he dies before its arrival. Lee picks the dead man's pocket, helping himself to a large amount of cash which he sees as a karmic reward, and noticing from his ID that his name was Cormac Leith. Cheryl finds a written note in Cormac's pocket which Will identifies as geographical coordinates.

The police speak to the four travellers who deny knowledge of the dead man's name and feign ignorance about his lack of personal effects. Unable to resume their journey immediately because black ice has closed the highway, they hole up in a motel for the night. Over drinks in the bar there, Cheryl looks up Cormac Leith online and discovers that he was recently released from a lengthy prison sentence and is the sole survivor of a bank robbery that netted millions of dollars' worth of gold coins. The four surmise that Cormac met his death attempting to retrieve the loot from the coordinates written on the note. Cheryl steals a GPS device and they realise the coordinates denote a spot only 30 miles away.

Lee and Cheryl are immediately keen to go after the gold. Will and Dawn are more hesitant but eventually come to see it as a route out of their crushing debt. The next morning, and initially gung-ho about their chances, the four drive to the closest bit of road to the coordinates and then embark on a long hike to the site.

Quickly their energy is sapped by inadequate clothing, mutual distrust, unexpected terrain and a frightening encounter with a hostile stranger. As the temperature drops and their chances of survival dwindle, they disagree on whether and how to continue. After a night spent in an improvised shelter, Will recognises that he is starting to die from frostbite and hypothermia, following an argument with Dawn, turns back on his own. She continues towards the treasure with Cheryl and Lee and the three eventually find the gold coins and fill their clothes with as much as they can carry.

Dawn fights with an increasingly irrational Cheryl and sets off alone to try to find her way back to the highway. Cheryl insists on trying to pull a heavy chest of coins, slowing her and Lee down.

Will makes his way back to the relative shelter of a cabin where it becomes apparent that Cheryl earlier murdered the trapper who lived there. Suddenly terrified for his wife, Will seizes the trapper's gun and snowmobile and sets off to try to rescue her.

Cheryl loses consciousness and is on the point of death. Furious that Dawn refused to help Cheryl at the end, Lee, who is armed with a knife, leaves Cheryl's body and pursues Dawn across a frozen lake.

Will reaches a cliff edge where he can see Lee chasing Dawn in the distance below. He attempts to shoot Lee using the trapper's gun but misses. Will uses the last of his strength to try to abseil down the cliff but falls and is knocked out.

Lee catches Dawn and attacks her. She manages to knock him over; he bangs his head and dies. Dawn, seeming to experience the paradoxical heat sensation of late stage hypothermia, removes her clothing, guaranteeing her death. She collapses.

Will comes round at the base of the cliff. He fires his gun into the air. Dawn fires a flare gun in response. In this way they achieve a final communication but neither has the strength to reach the other.

Will is rescued: the flare his dying wife fired alerted authorities to his plight. He wakes up in hospital with severe frostbite injuries and learns that his wife is dead. A police officer asks him why he went into the frozen wilderness. Will replies 'we were looking for gold - did they find it?'. The police officer shakes her head but, having left Will weeping in his bed, confides in a phone call that gold was discovered with the bodies of Lee, Cheryl and Dawn and that 'there's more out there'. She discloses that Cormac Leith is being cremated as an unidentified John Doe and makes a plan to go after the gold.

== Cast ==
- Jamie Bamber - Will
- Marie Avgeropoulos - Cheryl
- Aleks Paunovic- Lee
- Stefanie von Pfetten - Dawn
- Colin Cunningham - Loner
- Paul McGillion - Pete
- Gina Chiarelli - Officer Stevens
- Veena Sood - Dr. Reese
- Craig Erickson - Officer Alvin
- John Hainsworth - Cormac Leith

== Reception ==
Numb received mixed reviews and currently has a 50% score on Rotten Tomatoes. Justin Chang, writing in Variety, praised the film for "Admirably avoiding cheap 'gotcha' scares" but criticised the lack of "mounting suspense and tension over the long haul". Ken Eisner praised the film's twists and impressive handling by director Jason R. Goode and writer Andre Harden, although he had some criticism of the lack of character development given to the female characters. Jill Wilson states that the film "can’t decide if it’s a winter-survival movie or a buried-treasure movie" being better at the former than the latter.

Numb and its team however received 12 Leo Award nominations in 2016, including Best Motion Picture, Best Direction, Best Cinematography, Best Sound, Best Musical Score, Best Production Design, Best Costume Design, Best Makeup, Best Casting, Best Supporting Performance by a Female, Best Lead Performance by a Male, and won for Best Visual Effects.

Alain Mayrand received a Canadian Screen Award nomination for Best Original Score at the 5th Canadian Screen Awards in 2017.

== Film Festivals and Distribution ==
Numb premiered in the Midnight Passion selection at the Busan International Film Festival in 2015, before unspooling as the Closing Gala at the 2015 Whistler Film Festival It went on to play the high-profile Shanghai and Beijing International Film Festivals, amongst others.

The film was distributed in Canada by A71 Entertainment. It had a successful theatrical release, initially as part of the Canadian Indie Film Series with screenings in 16 Landmark Cinemas across Canada, before platforming to additional weekly stints in theatres across Canada. Numb is distributed in the US by Sony Pictures Home Entertainment, and has been released in 40+ international territories (including UK, Germany, Japan, Middle East, Spain, etc.).
