= Fighting Spirit =

Fighting Spirit may refer to:

- Fighting Spirit (manga) (Hajime no Ippo), a boxing anime and manga series
  - Victorious Boxers 2: Fighting Spirit, a boxing video game for the PlayStation 2 based on the anime/manga series
- "Fighting Spirit" (Power Rangers), the 27th episode of the American children's television series Power Rangers: Dino Thunder
- Fighting Spirit Magazine, a monthly professional wrestling and mixed martial arts magazine
- "Fighting Spirit", a bonus track on the 2005 Madonna album Confessions on a Dancefloor
