= Paul McGillion =

British-Canadian actor

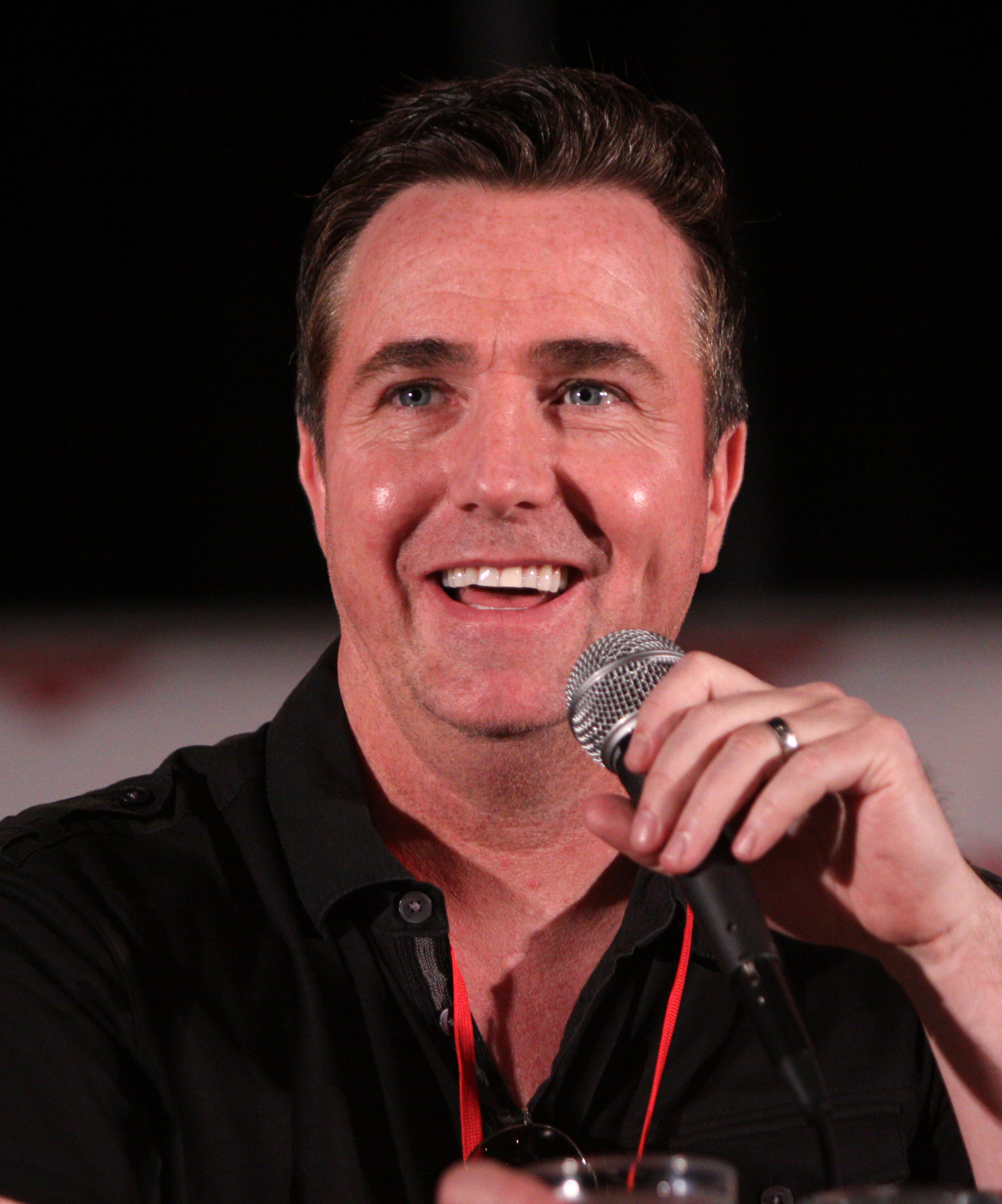
- McGillion at the 2011 Phoenix Comicon
- Born: January 5, 1969 (age 57); Paisley, Renfrewshire, Scotland
- Occupation: Actor
- Years active: 1994–present
- Children: 1
- Website: paulmcgillion.com

Paul McGillion (born January 5, 1969) is a Canadian actor, who has worked in television, film and theatre. He appeared on the television series Stargate Atlantis as Dr. Carson Beckett.

== Early life ==
McGillion was born on January 5, 1969 in Paisley, Renfrewshire, Scotland. His family moved to Canada when he was two years old. McGillion returned to Scotland with his family during his early teens, for a few years, while his father worked on the Shetland oil rigs. He is the sixth of seven children. He has a degree in teaching and while studying at Brock University, was part of their national championship-winning wrestling team. After graduating, McGillion began his career teaching theatre in Toronto, squeezing in time to attend auditions. He finally made the move to Vancouver, where he has worked extensively in film, TV and theatre.

== Career ==
McGillion taught scene study at the Vancouver Film School in 1998 and 1999. McGillion played young Ernest Littlefield in Stargate SG-1's first season, in the episode "The Torment of Tantalus", the first Tau'ri to have passed through the Stargate after its burial. In 2004, McGillion was cast in the science fiction series Stargate Atlantis as the Scottish medical doctor, Carson Beckett. He was initially cast as a recurring guest, but his character appeared so frequently in the show's first season, he was promoted to main character for seasons two and three. Dr. Beckett went back to a recurring character for seasons four and five, where he appears as the clone of the now-deceased Beckett.

McGillion has appeared in films, The Traveler with Val Kilmer, Confined with Emma Caulfield, and The Deal with Christian Slater. And has starred in the 2003 multi-award-winning film See Grace Fly. He stars in the short film A Fine Young Man, which premiered at the Toronto International Film Festival to rave reviews and won the Leo Awards for Best Short Film and Lead Actor for McGillion.

McGillion expressed great interest in auditioning for the role of Montgomery Scott in the 2009 eleventh Star Trek film. "I grew up watching Star Trek and Scotty was my favourite character. It would be a great honour to follow in James Doohan's footsteps," McGillion said. He had the endorsement of Chris Doohan, the son of original Scotty actor James Doohan, to play the role of Scotty in the film. Though the part ultimately went to Simon Pegg, McGillion still appeared in the film in a different role.

McGillion appeared in season 7 on the TV series 24 as Dr. Levinson, a doctor who tried to extract a dangerous pathogen from Jack Bauer's bloodstream.

McGillion appeared as the husband of a dying patient, in a season 3 episode of The Good Doctor.

== Filmography ==
=== Film ===
Year	Title	Role	Notes
1995	The Final Goal	Jeff Conway	
1995	Crying Freeman	Detective Andrews	
1998	Sploosh	Angus	Short film
1999	Something More	Andrew	
2000	Skullduggery	Marlon Carlson	
2000	Dangerous Attraction	Phillip Broger	
2000	My 5 Wives	Paul the Waiter / Danny	
2001	Replicant	Hal the Captain	
2002	Lonesome Joe	Coffee Shop Man	Short film
2003	A Guy Thing	Curt	
2003	See Grace Fly	Dominic McKinley	
2005	The Deal	Richard Kester	
2007	A Dog's Breakfast	Ryan	
2009	Star Trek	Barracks Leader	
2010	The Traveler	Deputy Jerry Pine	
2010	Confined	Detective Chris Cornell	
2010	A Fine Young Man	Mr. Grant	Short film
2012	Hit 'n Strum	Christopher	
2013	Yellowhead	Inspector	Short film
2015	Tomorrowland	English Teacher	
2015	Numb	Pete	
2015	Mr. Richard Francis	Mr. Richard Francis	Short film
2016	The Assignment	Paul Wincott	
2016	Hello Destroyer	Ron Burr	
2017	Death Note	Principal	
2017	Bigger Fatter Liar	Tom Shepherd	
2017	Heartbeats	Richard Andrews	
2017	Joe Finds Grace	Guitar Gene	
2018	Midnight Sun	Blake Davis	
2018	Before the Day	Ray	Short film
2018	Tom and Grant	Cop 1	Short film
2018	Skyscraper	On Scene Commander	
2018	O.I.	Det. Dirk	Short film

=== Television ===
Year	Title	Role	Notes
1994	The Commish	Officer Lee Burnett	Episode: "Ghost"
1994, 1997	The X-Files	Agent Comox / Fred Neiman	Episodes: "Duane Barry" & "Small Potatoes"
1995	Robin's Hoods	George Cranshaw	Episode: "Rock and a Hard Place"
1996	Sliders	First Officer	Episode: "Obsession"
1996	Have You Seen My Son	Mr. McQuinn	TV movie
1996	She Woke Up Pregnant	Marshall	TV movie
1997	Stargate SG-1	Young Ernest Littlefield	Episode: "The Torment of Tantalus"
1997	NightScream	Deputy Nance	TV movie
1998	The Sentinel	Boz Tate	Episode: "Love Kills"
1998	Mercy Point	Private Bane	Episode: "New Arrivals"
1998	First Wave	Raphael	Episode: "Lungfish"
1998, 2002, 2004	Cold Squad	Conrad / Neil Cranston / Constable Bacon	4 episodes
1999	Viper	John Kane	Episode: "Seminar from Hell"
1999	A Cooler Climate	Young Police Officer	TV movie
2000	Seven Days	Brandon	Episode: "Playmates and Presidents"
2000	Higher Ground		Episode: "Our Strongest Link"
2000	Strange World	Frank	Episode: "Food"
2001	Da Vinci's Inquest	Constable Kozak	Episode: "The Sparkle Tour"
2001	Love and Treason	Richard Keith	TV movie
2002	Just Cause	Earl Wenk	Episode: "Code of Silence"
2003	Smallville	Lex's Lackey	Episode: "Insurgence"
2003	The Twilight Zone	George	Episode: "It's Still a Good Life"
2003	Jake 2.0	Earl Wenk	Episode: "The Prince and the Revolution"
2003	Thanksgiving Family Reunion	Sheriff Kirkland	TV movie
2004	Romeo!	The Director	Episode: "Hack Came, Hacksaw, Hack Conquered"
2004	NTSB: The Crash of Flight 323	Joe	TV movie
2004	Jack	Bob	TV movie
2004	The Life	Jerry	TV movie
2004–2009	Stargate: Atlantis	Carson Beckett	62 episodes
2006	Engaged to Kill	Lester Denton	TV movie
2007, 2010	Sanctuary	Terrance Wexford	5 episodes
2008	Beyond Loch Ness	Michael Marshall	TV movie
2008	Mom, Dad and Her	Ben	TV movie
2009	24	Dr. Levinson	Episode: "Day 7: 6:00 a.m.–7:00 a.m."
2009, 2015	Supernatural	Jim Grossman / Peter Harper	Episodes: "Fallen Idols" & "There's No Place Like Home"
2010	V	Lawrence Parker	Episode: "Fruition"
2010	Shattered	Victor Hugo	Episode: "She Had You Fooled"
2010	A Trace of Danger	Mike	TV movie
2011	Endgame	Sebastian Wilks	Episode: "Deadman Talking"
2011	Against the Wall	Sam Burns	Episode: "Boys Are Back"
2011	Metal Shifters	Sheriff	TV movie
2011	Magic Beyond Words	Pete Rowling	TV movie
2011	Finding a Family	Jim Bante	TV movie
2011	Christmas Magic	Scott	TV movie
2012	Alcatraz	Alan Sylvane Jr.	Episode: "Pilot"
2012	True Justice	Magellan / Magellion	2 episodes
2012	Fringe	Edwin Massey	Episode: "The Recordist"
2012	Once Upon a Time	Knave of Hearts	2 episodes
2012	Witchslayer Gretl	Hansel	TV movie
2012, 2014	R.L. Stine's The Haunting Hour	Dad	2 episodes
2013	Cult	Glen Nash	Episode: "The Prophecy of St. Clare"
2013	The Killing	Andrew Clarke	Episode: "Eminent Domain"
2013	Delete	Raymond Vince	2 episodes
2013	Baby Sellers	Special Agent Holmes	TV movie
2014	Spooksville	Commodore Whalepanz	Episode: "Shell Shock"
2014	Signed, Sealed, Delivered	Henry Barrett	Episode: "The Masterpiece"
2014	Far from Home	Graham Westlake	TV movie
2015	The Whispers	Paul Wheeler	Episode: "Meltdown"
2015	When Calls the Heart	Floyd Conklin	Episode: "Heart and Soul"
2015	All of My Heart	Chef Oliver	TV movie
2015	Reluctant Witness	Warren Cooper	TV movie
2015	Ice Sculpture Christmas	Frank Shaw	TV movie
2015–2016	Girlfriends' Guide to Divorce	Gil	3 episodes
2016	Rescue Me	Larry	TV movie
2016	Unclaimed	Peter Ritchie	TV movie
2018	The Bletchley Circle: San Francisco	Howard Williams	2 episodes
2018	Darrow & Darrow	Coach Reed	2 episodes
2018	Frontier	Major Vinnicombe	3 episodes
2018	Time for Me to Come Home for Christmas	Lionel	TV movie
2018–2019	The Flash	Earl Cox	3 episodes
2019	Unspeakable	J.C.W. Weber	2 episodes
2019	The Good Doctor	Leo Adan	Episode: "Moonshot"
2019–2020	Picture Perfect Mysteries	Nick Carlin	3 episodes
2021	A Million Little Things	Dr. Anton	Episode: "Not Alone"
2021	Ann Rule's Circle of Deception	Russell Douglas	TV movie
2021	An Unexpected Christmas	Tom	TV movie
2021	Christmas in Tahoe	Archie Donaldson	TV movie
2021–2023	Firefly Lane	Bud	12 episodes
2021–2026	Family Law	Chip Crombie	6 episodes
2022	So Help Me Todd	Trevor Rapp	Episode: "Second Second Chance"
2023	Fargo	Captain Muscavage	2 episodes
2025	Happy Face	William	2 episodes
