= Agnes of God =

1979 play by John Pielmeier

- Written by: John Pielmeier
- Characters: Agnes; Mother Miriam Ruth; Dr. Martha Livingstone
- Date premiered: 1979
- Place premiered: Eugene O'Neill Theater Center
- Original language: English
- Subject: Drama
- Setting: A convent

Agnes of God is a 1979 play by American playwright John Pielmeier which tells the story of a novice nun who gives birth but does not believe she has. After the child is found dead, a psychiatrist and the mother superior of the convent clash during the resulting investigation. The title is a pun on the Latin phrase Agnus Dei ("lamb of God").

== Characters ==
The play has only three roles: Martha, the psychiatrist; the Mother Superior; and Agnes, the novice. All three are considered demanding for the actors playing them. Martha covers the full gamut of emotion during the play, from antagonist to nurturer, from hard nosed court psychiatrist and atheist to faith-searching healer. She is always on stage and has only three small respites from monologues or dialogue while Agnes and the Mother Superior enact flashbacks to events at the convent. The Mother Superior must expound the possibilities of miracles while recognizing the realities of today's world. Agnes is a beautiful but tormented soul whose abusive upbringing has affected her ability to think rationally.

== Historical casting ==
Character	1979 Eugene O'Neill cast	1980 Louisville cast	1982 Broadway cast	1983 1st National tour cast	1983 London cast	1985 Film cast
Mother Miriam Ruth	Jacqueline Brookes	Anne Pitoniak	Geraldine Page	Mercedes McCambridge	Honor Blackman	Anne Bancroft
Dr. Martha Livingstone	Jo Henderson	Adale O'Brien	Elizabeth Ashley	Elizabeth Ashley	Susannah York	Jane Fonda
Sister Agnes	Dianne Wiest	Mia Dillon	Amanda Plummer	Maryann Plunkett	Hilary Reynolds	Meg Tilly

== Production history ==
The play first was staged at the Eugene O'Neill Theater Center in Waterford, Connecticut in 1979. In 1980, it was further developed at the Actors Theatre of Louisville. Pielmeier had been an actor at both of these venues and had turned to playwriting; he began writing Agnes of God in the summer of 1978.

The play opened on Broadway on March 30, 1982 at the Music Box Theatre and closed on September 4, 1983 after 599 performances. Amanda Plummer received the Tony Award for Best Featured Actress in a Play, and Page was nominated for Best Actress in a Play. The director was Michael Lindsay-Hogg.

During the run, Elizabeth Ashley was succeeded in her role by Diahann Carroll and Amanda Plummer by Mia Dillon, Carrie Fisher and Maryann Plunkett. Lee Remick played the psychiatrist in the show's pre-Broadway run in Boston and was advertised for the New York run but left the show before the New York opening. A national tour was launched in 1983.

In 1983, the play was staged in London at the Greenwich Theatre. A production also was staged at the Center Stage Theatre in Baltimore, Maryland, starring Tania Myren-Zobel as Agnes.

In 1984, the play was staged in Mexico City. The production starred Marga López, María Teresa Rivas and Blanca Guerra in the main roles.

The National Tour starred Ashley, Plunkett, and Mercedes McCambridge. There were also two summer stock productions, one starring Sandy Dennis and Geraldine Page, and the other starring Peggy Cass and Susan Strasberg.

== Film adaptation ==
The 1985 film adaptation was directed by Norman Jewison, with a script also written by Pielmeier. It garnered three Academy Award nominations: Meg Tilly was nominated for the Academy Award for Best Supporting Actress, Anne Bancroft for Lead Actress for her performance as Mother Miriam, and Best Score. Anne Pitoniak, who played Miriam Ruth in the 1980 cast, also appears in the film, this time as the mother of Dr. Livingston.

== Background ==
Pielmeier was inspired to write the play after seeing an article in a newspaper about an event that occurred in a convent in Brighton, New York, just outside the city limits of Rochester. Sister Maureen Murphy, a thirty-six-year-old Montessori teacher, was found bleeding in her room by the other sisters of the convent after she did not come down for meals. Sister Maureen denied she had given birth; when examined by medical staff, she said she could not remember being pregnant. She had covered up the pregnancy by wearing the traditional nun's habit. The baby was found dead in her small convent room in a waste basket, asphyxiated.

The police found ticket stubs and other information in the nun's room indicating that precisely nine months earlier she had traveled out of state to an educational conference. During the trial, the father of the baby was never named.

At her trial, Sister Maureen waived her right to a jury, and Judge Hyman Maas presided. The trial was over in ten days, and Maas found the nun not guilty of all charges by reason of insanity in March 1977. The convent where the incident occurred is adjacent to the still-functioning suburban parish and school. The convent is used to house Nazareth University students. The girls' high school, St. Agnes, where some of the nuns taught, is closed.
