= Winter (Big Love) =

- Big Love episode
- Episode no.: Season 5 Episode 1
- Directed by: David Petrarca
- Written by: Mark V. Olsen; Will Scheffer
- Cinematography by: Rob Sweeney
- Editing by: Byron Smith
- Original release date: January 16, 2011
- Running time: 59 minutes

Guest appearances
- Gregory Itzin as Senator Dwyer; Joel McKinnon Miller as Don Embry; Steve Bacic as Goran; Anne Dudek as Lura Grant; Gary Hershberger as Bob Chetney; Carlos Jacott as Carl Martin; Branka Katić as Ana Mesovich; Cody Klop as Gary Embry; Katherine LaNasa as Beverly Ford; J. C. MacKenzie as Superintendent Buckland; Marianne Muellerleile as Principal Scanlon; Lenny Schmidt as Stuff Member; Grant Show as Michael Sainte; Audrey Wasilewski as Pam Martin; Kirk B. R. Woller as Fred Zurick

Episode chronology
← Previous "End of Days"	Next → "A Seat at the Table"

"Winter" is the first episode of the fifth season of the American drama television series Big Love. It is the 44th overall episode of the series and was written by series creators Mark V. Olsen and Will Scheffer, and directed by David Petrarca. It originally aired on HBO on January 16, 2011.

The series is set in Salt Lake City and follows Bill Henrickson, a fundamentalist Mormon. He practices polygamy, having Barbara, Nicki and Margie as his wives. The series charts the family's life in and out of the public sphere in their suburb, as well as their associations with a fundamentalist compound in the area. In the episode, the Henricksons face their new reality after their polygamy finally comes to light.

According to Nielsen Media Research, the episode was seen by an estimated 1.21 million household viewers and gained a 0.5/1 ratings share among adults aged 18–49. The episode received positive reviews from critics, who praised the new storylines and setting.

== Plot ==
Bill (Bill Paxton) takes his family to camp in the wilderness, just a few days after winning the election. When they return to their house, the family faces media scrutiny after Bill exposed their status. The Blackfoot Magic Casino has refused to pay their percentage to Bill, Margie (Ginnifer Goodwin) is fired from her job, and Wayne is bullied at school.

Don (Joel McKinnon Miller) has been re-hired into Home Plus, but some employees are now considering quitting after feeling Bill lied to them to win the election. Bill also moves into his Capitol office, but realizes that his only ally in the building was forced to resign after a DUI incident. He meets his colleague, Senator Dwyer (Gregory Itzin), but soon realizes he has no support within the hall. As Margie cries as she packs her stuff, she is approached by a self-help guru, Michael Sainte (Grant Show), who gives her a DVD to help her. Nicki (Chloë Sevigny) confronts Wayne's bully in school, but the kid accidentally breaks his teeth as he runs away from her. To help ease tension, Bill decides to host an open house in Margie's house for his 40,000 constituents, hoping at least a few show up.

After staying in the desert for a few days, Alby (Matt Ross) returns to Juniper Creek, but does not talk to his family. He later confides in Lura (Anne Dudek) that he plans to take revenge on Bill, while Adaleen (Mary Kay Place) is finally allowed to leave the cellar where she is imprisoned. With their status known, Margie and Goran (Steve Bacic) divorce, giving him and Ana (Branka Katić) two months to leave the United States. When a Home Plus employee makes a joke on underage marriage in the Church, Bill fires him, with Don opposing as they do not have enough support. Bill and his family attend a meeting with the school's board to discuss Wayne's bullying, where the bully identifies Nicki as the woman who attacked him. As they leave, Nicki reveals that Barbara (Jeanne Tripplehorn) has resorted to alcoholism, upsetting Bill.

Cara Lynn (Cassi Thomson) starts working at Home Plus, where she becomes smitten with Don's son, Gary (Cody Klop). When Nicki finds out, she scolds her for dating an adult man. Their conversation reveals that Nicki has not informed her of J.J.'s plans, as Nicki feels she is not ready. That night, the family hosts the open house, but no one shows up. Don confronts Bill over his decisions, asking for some respect in the decisions for the store, and Bill apologizes for his actions. Suddenly, a few constituents show up, and Bill welcomes them in the house.

== Production ==
=== Development ===
The episode was written by series creators Mark V. Olsen and Will Scheffer, and directed by David Petrarca. This was Olsen's 19th writing credit, Scheffer's 19th writing credit, and Petrarca's fifth directing credit.

== Reception ==
=== Viewers ===
In its original American broadcast, "Winter" was seen by an estimated 1.21 million household viewers with a 0.5/1 in the 18–49 demographics. This means that 0.5 percent of all households with televisions watched the episode, while 1 percent of all of those watching television at the time of the broadcast watched it. This was a 30% decrease in viewership from the previous episode, which was seen by an estimated 1.71 million household viewers with a 0.8/2 in the 18–49 demographics.

=== Critical reviews ===
"Winter" received positive reviews from critics. Emily St. James of The A.V. Club gave the episode a "B" grade and wrote, "It would be forced to focus on the character stuff it's always done so well, instead of the soapy plotting that so often threatened to sink it (and eventually did). Add on to that the news that this is to be the final season, and there was a good sense that Big Love could right its course. Does it? Not yet, but the season premiere is a good step in the right direction. For one thing, “Winter” is a surprisingly slow-moving episode, for the show."

Alan Sepinwall of HitFix wrote, "This final season takes some steps in the right direction away from the disaster of season four. I'm just not sure it takes enough of those steps."

James Poniewozik of TIME wrote, "The premiere episode, while not stellar, did a good job tightening the story's focus to show how badly Bill's strategy and its consequences have hit the family's sense of security and confidence." Megan Angelo of The Wall Street Journal wrote, "while newly minted state senator Bill Hendrickson outed himself as a polygamist, introducing Barb, Nicki and Margene to the world, behind the scenes the family was starting to splinter."

Aileen Gallagher of Vulture wrote, "This season, all the main characters are alone. We know this because the words "alone" or "on your own" or other synonyms are all over this episode. Parsing television for meaning has never been easier." Allyssa Lee of Los Angeles Times wrote, "After a frenzied Season 4 that seemed crammed tighter than a size 8 in size 2 skinny jeans, it now seems that the show has taken some lung-clearing deep breaths out in the desert and returned for Season 5 — its last — in top form."

TV Fanatic gave the episode a 4 star rating out of 5 and wrote, "The fourth season of Big Love ended in a major cliffhanger. Bill and his three wives publicly admitted to living a polygamist lifestyle. This was quite the ground-breaking moment. "Winter" brings us back into the aftermath of that momentous event, as each character handles the situation differently." Mark Blankenship of HuffPost wrote, "I'd much rather see the Henricksons leave with a complete story under their Garments than see them get axed in the middle of an unfinished plot. Plus, if the season opener, "Winter," is any indication, the imminent end of the series has also reinvigorated the creative team."
