= Blood Atonement (Big Love) =

- Big Love episode
- Episode no.: Season 4 Episode 7
- Directed by: David Petrarca
- Written by: Julia Cho
- Cinematography by: Anette Haellmigk
- Editing by: Byron Smith
- Original release date: February 21, 2010
- Running time: 57 minutes

Guest appearances
- Bruce Dern as Frank Harlow; Mary Kay Place as Adaleen Grant; Douglas Smith as Ben Henrickson; Adam Beach as Tommy Flute; Branka Katić as Ana Mesovich; Luke Askew as Hollis Green; Steve Bacic as Goran; Paul Ganus as American Counsel; Matthew Humphreys as Ron Reed; Eric Ladin as Dr. Roquet Walker; Sandy Martin as Selma Green; Mel Rodriguez as Don Dona; James Shanklin as Doctor; Thomas F. Wilson as Ricky Jax

Episode chronology
← Previous "Sins of the Father"	Next → "Next Ticket Out"

"Blood Atonement" is the seventh episode of the fourth season of the American drama television series Big Love. It is the 41st overall episode of the series and was written by Julia Cho, and directed by David Petrarca. It originally aired on HBO on February 21, 2010.

The series is set in Salt Lake City and follows Bill Henrickson, a fundamentalist Mormon. He practices polygamy, having Barbara, Nicki and Margie as his wives. The series charts the family's life in and out of the public sphere in their suburb, as well as their associations with a fundamentalist compound in the area. In the episode, Bill and Joey travel to Mexico to save Ben, Lois and Frank, while Margie tries to convince Ana to stay in the country.

According to Nielsen Media Research, the episode was seen by an estimated 1.71 million household viewers and gained a 0.8/2 ratings share among adults aged 18–49. The episode received mixed reviews from critics, with many criticizing the writing and logic.

== Plot ==
Bill (Bill Paxton) lies to his family by claiming he is going to Seattle for a business meeting, when he is actually going to Mexico with Joey (Shawn Doyle) to save Ben (Douglas Smith), Frank (Bruce Dern), Lois (Grace Zabriskie). They meet up with Jodean (Mireille Enos), who reveals that Frank was smuggling weapons, and Joey plans to use this to kill the Greenes to avenge Kathy's death.

Margie (Ginnifer Goodwin) visits Ana (Branka Katić) to talk about her baby, but discovers that she and Goran (Steve Bacic) plan to leave the country, as Goran will have his passport expired soon. To get her to stay, Margie offers to marry Goran through name so he can stay, and they agree to her plans. Nicki (Chloë Sevigny) is shocked when Adaleen (Mary Kay Place) claims she is pregnant. She is unable to believe it, until she corroborates the test herself. She goes to talk to Margie, but discovers her taking pictures with Goran to claim they were together for years. Nicki scolds her, also revealing that she is infertile and asking her not to tell anyone.

Bill discovers about Dean's suicide just as Hollis (Luke Askew) calls him up, as his name appeared as the new trustee head of UEB in newspapers. Hollis wants him in his compound, or he will execute Ben, Frank and Lois. The following day, Jodean sneaks into the compound and gets Bill to talk to his family through the phone, but she is captured by Hollis. This prompts him to move up "the trial" where he will order their deaths, but Ben convinces him in filing an appeal, giving them a one-hour heads-up. As Bill and Joey prepare to enter, Bill forces Joey at gunpoint to stay behind, having learned of his plan to kill the Greenes instead of focusing on saving his family. Back in Utah, Barbara (Jeanne Tripplehorn) and Tommy (Adam Beach) face problems at the casino when they are notified of a possible bomb threat. When they suspect Evangelical Ron Reed (Matthew Humphreys) is responsible, they realize that Reed is working alongside Marilyn and Paley.

At the Mexican compound, Frank finally expresses remorse for his actions, lamenting having to exile Bill because Roman ordered him. Bill manages to release them, but he and Ben are forced to carry Frank as he lost his medication. As they near their car, Joey arrives with a shotgun, preparing to kill the Greenes. Bill tries to reason with Joey, until Joey finally reveals that he killed Roman. Hollis and his henchmen arrive, ordering everyone to return. Bill offers himself up in exchange for his family, and Hollis accepts and orders his death. However, Lois chops off Hollis' right arm with a machete, causing him to faint. As Selma (Sandy Martin) tries to stop the bleeding, she allows Bill and his family to leave while she takes Hollis to a hospital. They return to Utah, where Ben is reunited with Barbara at home.

== Production ==
=== Development ===
The episode was written by Julia Cho, and directed by David Petrarca. This was Cho's first writing credit, and Petrarca's third directing credit.

== Reception ==
=== Viewers ===
In its original American broadcast, "Blood Atonement" was seen by an estimated 1.71 million household viewers with a 0.8/2 in the 18–49 demographics. This means that 0.8 percent of all households with televisions watched the episode, while 2 percent of all of those watching television at the time of the broadcast watched it. This was a 14% increase in viewership from the previous episode, which was seen by an estimated 1.50 million household viewers with a 0.6/2 in the 18–49 demographics.

=== Critical reviews ===
"Blood Atonement" received mixed reviews from critics. Amelie Gillette of The A.V. Club gave the episode a "B" grade and wrote, "Big Love still has about 75 plots to conclude, augment, embellish, or complicate — and the show is adding more all the time! Case in point: Tonight's episode was mainly focused on Bill's efforts to rescue Ben, Frank, and Lois (but mostly Ben) from Hollis Green's Mexican compound, Ciudad Green. While it was fun to see how the Greens live and adjudicate in Mexico, personally I didn't find this plotline nearly as interesting as the writers apparently did."

Alan Sepinwall wrote, "We're in the home stretch for this season of Big Love, and things continue to feel much too busy to me." Nick Catucci of Vulture wrote, "It was one wacky episode of Big Love this week, and we're not certain that’s a bad thing. With all the simmering tension this season, the lid had to be blown off at some point, right? Still, the sheer ridiculousness of it all is unprecedented. And it left us wondering just how much any of this mattered."

James Poniewozik of TIME wrote, "“Blood Atonement” — which indeed earned the “blood” portion of its title — was perhaps the most ludicrous, over-the-top episode of Big Love yet, and that's saying something. From the family home to Juniper Creek to the lurid Ciudad Greene compound, the show went full-on into daytime-soap mode: there was a violent cult, a bomb threat, a surprise pregnancy, a surprise wedding, histrionic family showdowns, abductions, near-executions and a confession of murder. This may sound like an insult, but “Blood Atonement” was really a thing of garish, baroque beauty." Allyssa Lee of Los Angeles Times wrote, "After last week's great churning drama, this episode, titled “Blood Atonement” took a detour south of the border, off the map and into a heart of darkness that set up the third and final act of this season. And though the Mexican aviary plot was all a bit too out there and fringey for my taste, I was glad to see it made a bloody show of tying up the telenovela bird-smuggling Hollis Greene entanglement and transported the family out of Mexico and back to Utah. Not to mention that it set forward Marilyn's true motives for getting involved with the casino."

TV Fanatic gave the episode a perfect 5 star rating out of 5 and wrote, "Many can argue that they thought that the episode was too busy, but we thought it was the perfect example of why we love this show so much. Chaos! Madness! And just plain ridiculousness!" Mark Blankenship of HuffPost wrote, "I feel Big Love changing, and while I'm not quite ready for a divorce, our marriage is certainly in trouble. Every week, you see, the series looks more like a grotesque soap opera. Every call from God and bomb in the casino makes it harder to feel like I'm watching the lives of people who might actually exist."

Julia Cho submitted this episode for consideration for Outstanding Writing for a Drama Series, while Sandy Martin and Bruce Dern submitted it for Outstanding Guest Actress and Outstanding Guest Actor at the 62nd Primetime Emmy Awards.
