= End of Days (Big Love) =

- Big Love episode
- Episode no.: Season 4 Episode 9
- Directed by: David Petrarca
- Written by: Eileen Myers
- Cinematography by: Anette Haellmigk
- Editing by: Byron Smith; Alan Cody
- Original release date: March 7, 2010
- Running time: 59 minutes

Guest appearances
- Sissy Spacek as Marilyn Densham; Mary Kay Place as Adaleen Grant; Joel McKinnon Miller as Don Embry; Douglas Smith as Ben Henrickson; Adam Beach as Tommy Flute; Perry King as Clark Paley; Amy Aquino as Leslie Usher; Steve Bacic as Goran; Anne Dudek as Lura Grant; Margaret Easley as April Blessing; Graham Hamilton as Westlake; Melinda Page Hamilton as Malinda; Matt Kaminsky as Winston Kandinsky; Branka Katić as Ana Mesovich; Larry King as Himself; Eric Ladin as Dr. Roquet Walker; Bella Thorne as Tancy "Teenie" Henrickson; Misty Upham as Leila Stilwell; Tom Virtue as TV Moderator

Episode chronology
← Previous "Next Ticket Out"	Next → "Winter"

"End of Days" is the ninth episode and season finale of the fourth season of the American drama television series Big Love. It is the 43rd overall episode of the series and was written by Eileen Myers, and directed by David Petrarca. It originally aired on HBO on March 7, 2010.

The series is set in Salt Lake City and follows Bill Henrickson, a fundamentalist Mormon. He practices polygamy, having Barbara, Nicki and Margie as his wives. The series charts the family's life in and out of the public sphere in their suburb, as well as their associations with a fundamentalist compound in the area. In the episode, Bill prepares for elections, just as he is pressured into thinking over what his family needs.

According to Nielsen Media Research, the episode was seen by an estimated 1.71 million household viewers and gained a 0.8/2 ratings share among adults aged 18–49. The episode received mixed reviews from critics; while many were divided over the closure to the storylines, some praised its ending as a new potential storyline for the series.

== Plot ==
Adaleen (Mary Kay Place) is reported missing, just as Kansas starts opening an investigation into Juniper Creek. Bill (Bill Paxton) visits Alby (Matt Ross) to question his involvement, but Alby denies the rumors. Alby states he supports Bill's election, but becomes upset when Bill asks if he will continue the works of Dale.

Barbara (Jeanne Tripplehorn) finds that the drug addicted Native American woman returned, and asks Tommy (Adam Beach) for help. However, she is shocked when Tommy finally reveals that the woman is his niece; he and Jerry have been covering many drug businesses in the reservation and lied to the DEA. Barbara promises to help him in his situation. Ana (Branka Katić) confronts the Henricksons over Margie (Ginnifer Goodwin) divorcing Goran (Steve Bacic), as it will dampen their citizenship. Privately, Margie finally confesses that she wanted the divorce as she also has feelings for Goran, and Ana supports her decision.

When a news reporter warns Bill that his child with Ana will be announced at a later broadcast, Bill visits Marilyn (Sissy Spacek) to get her to drop the story. She agrees, if he stops meeting with Paley (Perry King) to stop her influence. The story is not published, but Barbara reveals that she was the one who leaked it to the press, fearing that the public will not approve their polygamy style. Furious, Bill has Tommy and Jerry fired from the tribal council to avoid any possible drug scandal, upsetting her. As she is looking for Adaleen, Nicki (Chloë Sevigny) is called by a Juniper Creek doctor, who surprises her with a reveal: she is pregnant, and he wants her to come to his clinic.

Marilyn later visits Bill at his house; Tommy confessed that he is a polygamist, and she plans to destroy his career. Bill is also visited by Wanda (Melora Walters), who reveals that Nicki is in danger and that J.J. (Željko Ivanek) has impregnated Adaleen with her and J.J.'s child, and that Nicki is being tricked into having Cara Lynn's egg implanted into her. At the clinic, the doctor sedates Nicki, and J.J. prepares to place the egg. However, Adaleen escapes from her room and attacks J.J., allowing Nicki to stab him in the back. As Adaleen chases J.J. out of the clinic, Bill arrives to save Nicki.

The Henricksons console Nicki at their house, when Bill is called by Ben (Douglas Smith); he has won the election. As he prepares to deliver a speech, Barbara suggests she might divorce him, feeling that she does not need him. Back at Juniper Creek, Adaleen traps J.J. and his wife in the clinic, and then kills them by setting it on fire. On the State Capitol, Bill delivers his speech to thank his supporters. Suddenly, he finally reveals he is a polygamist, causing many of the spectators to walk out and others to boo him. He then invites Nicki, Margie and Barbara to join him, presenting them as his wives.

== Production ==
=== Development ===
The episode was written by Eileen Myers, and directed by David Petrarca. This was Myers' eighth writing credit, and Petrarca's fourth directing credit.

== Reception ==
=== Viewers ===
In its original American broadcast, "End of Days" was seen by an estimated 1.71 million household viewers with a 0.8/2 in the 18–49 demographics. This means that 0.8 percent of all households with televisions watched the episode, while 2 percent of all of those watching television at the time of the broadcast watched it. This was a 11% decrease in viewership from the previous episode, which was seen by an estimated 1.92 million household viewers with a 0.8/2 in the 18–49 demographics.

=== Critical reviews ===
"End of Days" received mixed reviews from critics. Amelie Gillette of The A.V. Club gave the episode a "C+" grade and wrote, "I'd forgive the writers that cheap cop out if it meant we could all just pretend this whole unbelievable, moronic state senate plot never happened and get back to the dramatically sound Big Love of yore. The Big Love that was more concerned with characters than with plot. The Big Love that stuck close to home and the Henricksons, with a little of the Juniper Creek compound thrown in for good measure. The Big Love that might have a Tetherball For Your Wife battle, but that definitely wouldn't include a Mexican getaway/kidnapping rescue and a state senate run."

Alan Sepinwall wrote, "The acting by many of the female castmembers is still great, even if the characters' journeys only sometimes make sense. That, plus my vague curiosity at seeing how much ruin descends on the family now that Bill has stupidly come out of the closet, may keep me watching through gritted teeth next season. But this year was a pretty spectacular creative failure, and I hope the creative team is more capable of learning from its mistakes than Bill is."

James Poniewozik of TIME wrote, "Bill took his stand, apparently oblivious to the anxiety in the eyes of the wives he pressured into the spotlight with him. Bad idea or not, the die is cast, the stakes are set and the focus is (I hope) back on the relationships that matter in this show. Let's hope in season 5, Bill's terrible idea turns out to be a good one for Big Love." Nick Catucci of Vulture wrote, "There's no negotiating with him over business or visitation, like there was with Roman and J.J. Bill caught between brother and sister, in exile from his life of upper-middle-class striving — that would make for an excellent season five."

Emily St. James of HitFix wrote, "Big Love ends a frustrating, flawed season with what might be its best season finale yet. There will likely be a hue and cry from people who just don't buy that Bill would ever get so far as to out his family as a polygamist one on the steps of the state capitol, and I suppose I can see the point of view that Bill's wives, who are clearly uneasy about this whole turn of events, should have struck back harder, should have killed this idea dead. But I'm still on board." Allyssa Lee of Los Angeles Times wrote, "Well, he did it. This episode was called “End of Days,” but really, this Season 4 finale just set up the series for a whole new beginning. Not to say that there weren't more than a couple moments in this jam-packed episode that made it seem like the apocalypse was nigh. But the big game-changer, of course, was that Bill made good on his word and announced that he was a polygamist after winning his bid for Utah State Senate."

TV Fanatic gave the episode a 4.5 star rating out of 5 and wrote, "We were happy that many loose ends were tied up, but one thing is certain, next season will be filled with all sorts of craziness! We can't wait to see how all of their lives will change now that the cat is out of the bag." Mark Blankenship of HuffPost wrote, "let's assume that Big Love is going to emerge from the wreckage of this terrible season with a new sense of purpose. But as we're being hopeful, let's also be frank: Girl, this show gone crazy. Can we get security?"

Sissy Spacek submitted this episode for consideration for Outstanding Guest Actress in a Drama Series at the 62nd Primetime Emmy Awards. Spacek was nominated, but would lose the award to Ann-Margret for Law & Order: Special Victims Unit.
