= Next Ticket Out =

- Big Love episode
- Episode no.: Season 4 Episode 8
- Directed by: David Knoller
- Written by: Patricia Breen
- Cinematography by: Alex Nepomniaschy
- Editing by: Chris Figler
- Original release date: February 28, 2010
- Running time: 57 minutes

Guest appearances
- Sissy Spacek as Marilyn Densham; Mary Kay Place as Adaleen Grant; Douglas Smith as Ben Henrickson; Adam Beach as Tommy Flute; Amy Aquino as Leslie Usher; Steve Bacic as Goran; Robert Beltran as Jerry Flute; Jason Brooks as Attorney; Anne Dudek as Lura Grant; Judith Hoag as Cindy Price; Chane't Johnson as INS Agent; Matt Kaminsky as Winston Kandinsky; Branka Katić as Ana Mesovich; Eric Ladin as Dr. Roquet Walker; Peggy Miley as June Walker; David Naughton as Mr. Usher; Matthew Humphreys as Ron Reed; Dan Sachoff as Kurt Rainer; Bella Thorne as Tancy "Teenie" Henrickson; Audrey Wasilewski as Pam Martin

Episode chronology
← Previous "Blood Atonement"	Next → "End of Days"

"Next Ticket Out" is the eighth episode of the fourth season of the American drama television series Big Love. It is the 42nd overall episode of the series and was written by producer Patricia Breen, and directed by executive producer David Knoller. It originally aired on HBO on February 28, 2010.

The series is set in Salt Lake City and follows Bill Henrickson, a fundamentalist Mormon. He practices polygamy, having Barbara, Nicki and Margie as his wives. The series charts the family's life in and out of the public sphere in their suburb, as well as their associations with a fundamentalist compound in the area. In the episode, Bill and Barbara confront Marilyn over her true motives, while Nicki discovers the truth behind her father's death.

According to Nielsen Media Research, the episode was seen by an estimated 1.92 million household viewers and gained a 0.9/2 ratings share among adults aged 18–49. The episode received positive reviews from critics, who deemed the episode as more focused than the previous episodes.

== Plot ==
During a family dinner, Sarah (Amanda Seyfried) reveals she and Scott plan to move to Portland, shocking the family. Barbara (Jeanne Tripplehorn) tells Bill (Bill Paxton) that she discovered that Marilyn (Sissy Spacek) is working with the Evangelists and confesses that she hired her at the casino, prompting Bill to fire Barbara from the casino. The following day, Bill and Tommy (Adam Beach) fire Marilyn from the casino and retrieve information from her computer.

Bill wants to tell Nicki (Chloë Sevigny) that Joey (Shawn Doyle) is responsible for Roman's death, but is unable to say anything as she is struggling with her infertility. Bill also faces a PR nightmare when Barbara attends an event, and suggests that married women rely on prescription drugs in their lives. This allows his opponent, Leslie Usher (Amy Aquino), to use it against him in a debate, and Bill demands that Barbara recant her statement. Bill also learns that Margie (Ginnifer Goodwin) is marrying Goran (Steve Bacic) and confronts her at her casino office. During this, they share a kiss, which is overseen by Marilyn. Marilyn confronts Bill and Barbara, believing that he is having an affair and planning to reveal it to the public to ruin his image.

Alby (Matt Ross) is questioned over Dale's suicide, and he suggests the apartment was bought by Dale but does not disclose his relationship. He is later visited by Nicki, who asks him to leave Juniper Creek. During this, he sees Roman's ghost (Harry Dean Stanton) scolding him, and he refuses Nicki's offer. After being told by Barbara that Joey was involved in her father's death, Nicki angrily takes Wanda (Melora Walters) and her kids to her house, avoiding J.J. (Željko Ivanek) at all costs. Nicki angrily confronts Bill for not revealing it, although they reconcile later that night when Bill says he was just waiting for the right moment.

Margie starts reconsidering her marriage with Goran after he starts developing feelings for her, but she still moves him into her house to help build their "marriage". Seeing him, Bill decides to play tetherball with him, where he turns aggressive and manages to punch Goran in the face. Barbara is called by Marilyn, who has deduced that she is lying over her relationship with Bill and Margie, but Barbara denies it. Bill also visits Sarah at her apartment, telling her he will not intervene in her plans and supports her decision. On a TV appearance with their children, Bill and Barbara deflect Barbara's comment, but Bill surprises by supporting his wife's comments. Later, the Henricksons throw a birthday party for Teenie (Bella Thorne), while also giving a quilt to Sarah before she leaves.

== Production ==
=== Development ===
The episode was written by producer Patricia Breen, and directed by executive producer David Knoller. This was Breen's first writing credit, and Knoller's third directing credit.

== Reception ==
=== Viewers ===
In its original American broadcast, "Next Ticket Out" was seen by an estimated 1.92 million household viewers with a 0.9/2 in the 18–49 demographics. This means that 0.9 percent of all households with televisions watched the episode, while 2 percent of all of those watching television at the time of the broadcast watched it. This was a 12% increase in viewership from the previous episode, which was seen by an estimated 1.71 million household viewers with a 0.8/2 in the 18–49 demographics.

=== Critical reviews ===
"Next Ticket Out" received positive reviews from critics. Amelie Gillette of The A.V. Club gave the episode a "B+" grade and wrote, "We've only got one more episode of Big Love to go, and so tonight's jaunt through the many, many unresolved plotlines felt, well, like a jaunt through the many unresolved plotlines—a quick ratcheting up of the intensity before next week's big, official season finale."

Alan Sepinwall wrote, "Well, nothing on tonight's penultimate episode of Big Love season four was as gonzo or ridiculous as last week's Mexican adventure, but there's still too much going on and I have yet to see anything to convince me that Bill's political campaign isn't the most credibility-damaging storyline on a previously-good drama since the Dillon Panthers' backup tight end went on a 12-state killing spree. On the plus side? Tetherball fights always remind me of good times at summer camp." Nick Catucci of Vulture wrote, "The truth, of course, is that Bill had actually challenged Goran — Margie's deliciously European groom-to-be — to a tetherball match, finally besting the non-American with a knock to his artfully unshaven face. Whatever it says about Bill, this little set piece felt like recess from all the big-dawg drama — a few fleeting moments of exhilarating fun. Loved it."

Emily St. James of HitFix wrote, ""Next Ticket Out" is another deeply flawed episode of Big Love, but at least it's not as bottom-scraping as last week's episode. Indeed, the whole thing moves with the illogic and terror of a nightmare, with all the strengths and weaknesses that that implies." Allyssa Lee of Los Angeles Times wrote, "It's the penultimate episode in this fourth season, Big Love fans, and after last week's crazy, south-of-the-border detour, it's nice to see all the action has been brought back to Salt Lake City and focused squarely on the family."

TV Fanatic gave the episode a 4.5 star rating out of 5 and wrote, "All things considered, this episode definitely makes us anxious to see all the craziness that will happen next week. It's kind of like the feeling you have right before you are about to kiss someone for the first time - the butterflies, and the anticipation of whether it will be good or be a total plane crash." Mark Blankenship of HuffPost wrote, "This is the clearest the show has ever been about how Bill's faith or hubris or whatever has warped him into a self-centered, self-righteous, and immature hypocrite with a raging God complex. He may believe he gets his instructions from The Principle or from God, but he interprets those instructions to mean that everyone in his family should do exactly what he says at all times."
