= List of awards and nominations received by Arnold Schwarzenegger =

Arnold Schwarzenegger awards and nominations
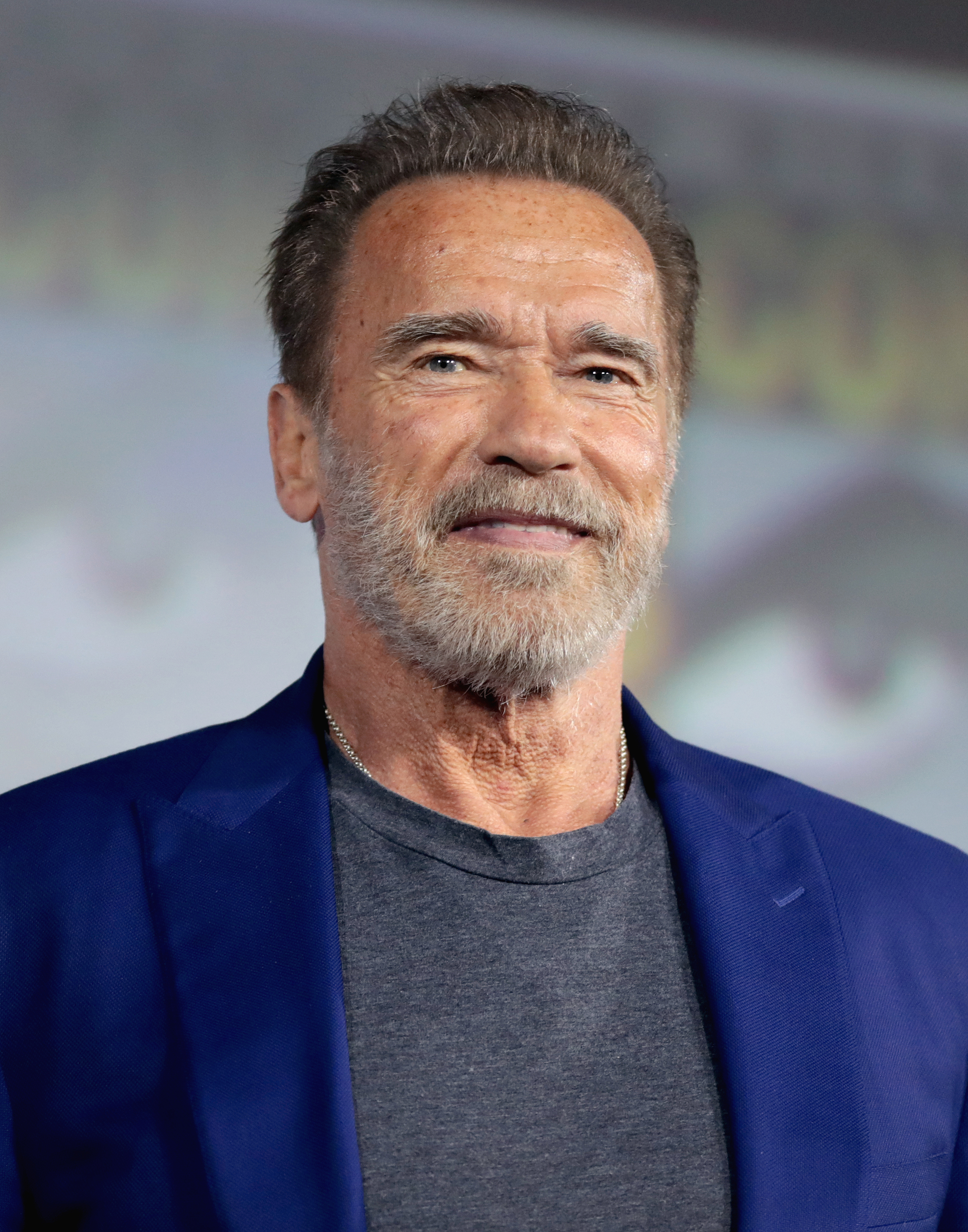
- Schwarzenegger in 2019
Awards and nominations
Award	Wins	Nominations
Emmy Awards	1	1
Golden Globes	1	2

Totals (Note: Certain award groups do not simply award one winner. They acknowledge several different recipients, have runners-up, and have third place. Since this is a specific recognition and is different from losing an award, runner-up mentions are considered wins in this award tally. For simplification and to avoid errors, each award in this list has been presumed to have had a prior nomination.)
- Wins: 32
- Nominations: 37

This article is a List of awards and nominations by Arnold Schwarzenegger

Arnold Schwarzenegger is an Austrian-American actor, businessman, film producer, politician, and former professional bodybuilder. He has gained recognition as a film icon for his leading roles in action films. He has received various accolades including a Golden Globe Award, a Primetime Emmy Award, three Nickelodeon Kids' Choice Awards, and an MTV Movie Award as well as nominations for seven Saturn Awards. He has received various honorary awards including a Motion Picture star on the Hollywood Walk of Fame in 1987, Goldene Kamera awards in 1997 and 2015, Empire's Action Hero of Our Lifetime Award in 2014, GQ Magazines' Legend of the Century Award in 2017.

Schwarzenegger won the Golden Globe Award for New Star of the Year – Actor for the Bob Rafelson directed comedy-drama Stay Hungry (1976). He was nominated for the Golden Globe Award for Best Actor in a Motion Picture – Musical or Comedy for his comedic role as a scientist who undergoes a male pregnancy in the Ivan Reitman directed comedy Junior (1994). He was nominated for the Primetime Emmy Award for Outstanding Documentary or Nonfiction Series for the Showtime / National Geographic documentary series Years of Living Dangerously (2014–2016).

He has received seven Saturn Award for Best Actor nominations for his performances as the title role in James Cameron's The Terminator (1984), Terminator 2: Judgment Day (1991), and Harry Tasker in True Lies (1994), as well as for Alan "Dutch" Schaefer in the science-fiction horror film Predator (1987), Douglas Quaid / Hauser in Paul Verhoeven's Total Recall (1990), an LAPD officer in the action comedy Last Action Hero (1993), and Adam Gibson in the science fiction action film The 6th Day (2000). He won three Kids' Choice Awards for Favorite Movie Actor for his performances in the buddy comedy Twins (1988), the action comedy Kindergarten Cop (1990), and Terminator 2 (1991).

As a professional bodybuilder, he has been named a Seven-time Mr. Olympia winner, a Four-time Mr. Universe winner, and the World Amateur Bodybuilding Champion in 1969. Schwarzenegger has also was inducted into the International Sports Hall of Fame in 2012 and the WWE Hall of Fame in 2015. He received the Medal for Humanitary Merit of the Austrian Albert Schweitzer Society in 2011.

As a politician, he has received the Muhammad Ali Humanitarian Award in 2002, the Governors Arts Leadership Award in 2009, and the Benchmark Mineral Intelligence Lifetime Achievement Award in 2023. He was named a Cavalier (2011) and Commander (2017) of the French Legion of Honor. He has also received numerous Honorary doctorates from institutions from the United States, Berlin and Belfast.

== Major associations ==
=== Emmy Awards ===
Year	Category	Nominated work	Result	Ref.
Primetime Emmy Awards
2014	Outstanding Documentary or Nonfiction Series	Years of Living Dangerously	Won	

=== Golden Globe Awards ===
Year	Category	Nominated work	Result	Ref.
1977	New Star of the Year – Actor	Stay Hungry	Won	
1995	Best Actor in a Motion Picture – Musical or Comedy	Junior	Nominated	

== Other film awards ==
Organizations	Year	Category	Work	Result	Ref.
MTV Movie Awards	1992	Best Male Performance	Terminator 2: Judgment Day	Won	
MTV Movie Awards	1995	Best Kiss (with Jamie Lee Curtis)	True Lies	Nominated	
MTV Movie Awards	1995	Best Dance Sequence (with Tia Carrere)	True Lies	Nominated	
Nickelodeon Kids' Choice Awards	1988	Favorite Movie Actor	The Running Man	Nominated	
Nickelodeon Kids' Choice Awards	1989	Favorite Movie Actor	Twins	Won	
Nickelodeon Kids' Choice Awards	1991	Favorite Movie Actor	Kindergarten Cop	Won	
Nickelodeon Kids' Choice Awards	1992	Favorite Movie Actor	Terminator 2: Judgment Day	Won	
Saturn Awards	1985	Best Actor	The Terminator	Nominated	
Saturn Awards	1988	Best Actor	Predator	Nominated	
Saturn Awards	1991	Best Actor	Total Recall	Nominated	
Saturn Awards	1992	Best Actor	Terminator 2: Judgment Day	Nominated	
Saturn Awards	1994	Best Actor	Last Action Hero	Nominated	
Saturn Awards	1995	Best Actor	True Lies	Nominated	
Saturn Awards	2001	Best Actor	The 6th Day	Nominated	
Teen Choice Awards	2004	Choice Movie Actor – Drama/Action Adventure	Terminator 3: Rise of the Machines	Nominated	

== Honorary awards ==
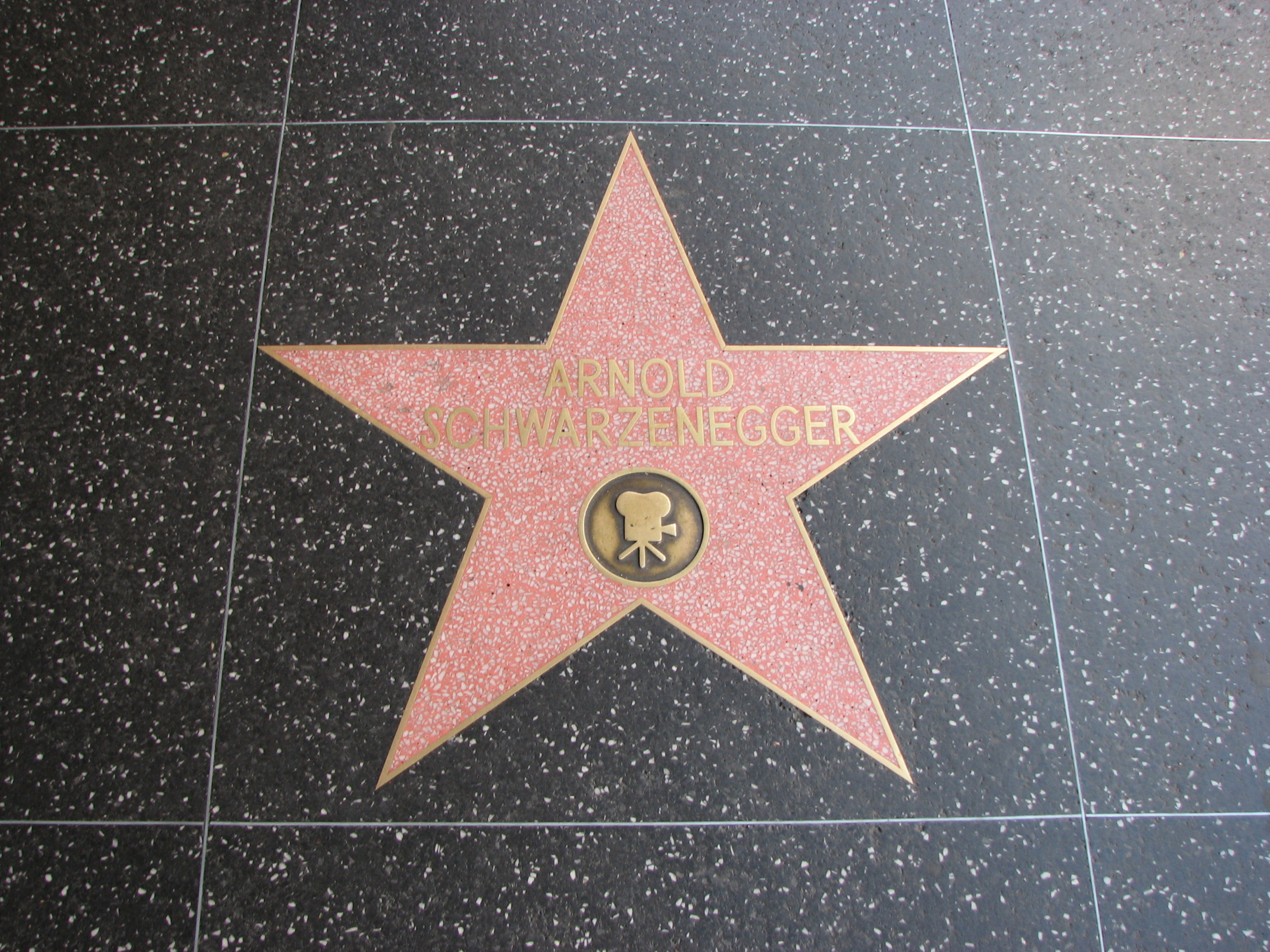
Schwarzenegger's star on the Hollywood Walk of Fame

"I do movies people like to see. It's that simple. You try to make sure the movies are memorable. Not just another movie. You've got to have a feeling for hipness. You milk certain lines. 'Hasta la vista, baby,' or, 'I lied.' You go a little over the top. People love it. Kids love it. And you do some athletic stuff, some fitness, and people think you're cool."

— Schwarzenegger reacting to his career as an actor.

"If anybody asked me about getting to the top in acting and making movies – becoming like a Clint Eastwood or a Warren Beatty or a Burt Reynolds – people would say, 'Do you know what it takes to get there? How are you going to do it?' I didn't have an answer. But something was in me that made me feel like it was going to happen."

— Schwarzenegger on his desire to become an actor.

Year	Organization	Award
1985	ShoWest Convention	Special Award – International Star of the Year
1987	Hollywood Walk of Fame	Motion picture camera star (1,847th star)
1992	The Saturn Awards	Life Career Award
1992	Nickelodeon Kids' Choice Awards	Hall of Fame
1993	ShoWest Convention	Special Award – International Star of the Decade
1996	Bambi	Film – International
1996	Golden Apple Awards	Male Star of the Year
1996	University of Wisconsin–Superior	Doctor of Humane Letters
1997	ShoWest Convention	Humanitarian Award
1997	Goldene Kamera	Best International Actor
1998	American Cinematheque Gala Tribute	American Cinematheque Award
1998	Blockbuster Entertainment Awards	World Artist Award
2001	Taurus World Stunt Awards	Taurus Honorary Award
2004	Cinequest Film Festival	Maverick Tribute Award
2006	University of Southern California	Doctor of Humane Letters
2010	Emory University	Doctor of Laws
2014	Empire Awards	Action Hero of Our Lifetime Award
2015	WWE Hall of Fame	Hall of Fame Class (2015)
2015	Goldene Kamera	International Lifetime Achievement Award
2017	University of Houston	Doctor of Humane Letters
2017	GQ Men of the Year Awards	Legend of the Century
2026	Ulster University	Doctor of the University

== Miscellaneous awards ==
=== Bodybuilding ===
- Seven-time Mr. Olympia winner
- Four-time Mr. Universe winner
- 1969 World Amateur Bodybuilding Champion

=== Halls of Fame ===
- International Sports Hall of Fame (class of 2012)
- WWE Hall of Fame (class of 2015)
- Medal for Humanitary Merit of the Austrian Albert Schweitzer Society (2011)
- Star on the Hollywood Walk of Fame

=== State/local ===
- Public art mural portrait "Arnold Schwarzenegger" (2012) by Jonas Never, Venice, Los Angeles
- Schwarzenegger Institute for State and Global Policy (part of the USC Price School of Public Policy at the University of Southern California) named in his honor.
- Arnold's Run ski trail at Sun Valley Resort named in his honor. The trail is categorized as a double black diamond, or most difficult, for its terrain.

=== International ===
- Grand Decoration of Honour for Services to the Republic of Austria in Gold (1993)
- Cavalier (2011) and Commander (2017) of the French Legion of Honor
- Honorary Ring of the Federal State of Styria (Austria, June 2017)
- "A Day for Arnold" on July 30, 2007, in Thal, Austria. For his 60th birthday, the mayor sent Schwarzenegger the enameled address sign (Thal 145) of the house where Schwarzenegger was born, declaring "This belongs to him. No one here will ever be assigned that number again".
- "Honor et Gloria" White Cross (No.179) – 2023; Ukrainian non-state decoration bestowed by the VGO "Kraina" (NGO) at the request of Mr Anatoliy Ostapenko (member of the Verkhovna Rada)
- Honorary doctorate from Stockton University (United States, 2023).
- Honorary doctorate from the Hertie School (Berlin, 2024), for achievements in governance and climate action.
- Honorary doctorate from Ulster University (Belfast, Northern Ireland, 2026), for contributions to public service, environmental issues, and the arts.

== See also ==
- Arnold Schwarzenegger filmography
