= A Seat at the Table (disambiguation) =

A Seat at the Table is a studio album by American singer-songwriter Solange.

A Seat at the Table may also refer to:

- "A Seat at the Table" (Big Love), a 2011 television episode
- "A Seat at the Table" (The Morning Show), a 2019 television episode
- "A Seat at the Table" (New Amsterdam), a 2019 television episode
- "A Seat at the Table" (The Offer), a 2022 television episode

== See also ==
- Seat at the Table with Anand Giridharadas, a television talk show
