= Under One Roof =

Under One Roof may refer to:

In television:

- Under One Roof (1985 TV series), an American teen sitcom previously titled Spencer
- Under One Roof (1993 TV series), a Japanese series generally known under the title Hitotsu Yane no Shita
- Under One Roof (Singaporean TV series), a 1995–2003 Singaporean sitcom
- Under One Roof (1995 TV series), an American drama series
- Under One Roof (2002 TV series), an American reality series
- Under One Roof (2008 TV series), an American comedy series
- Under One Roof (Big Love), an episode of the American TV series Big Love

In other media:

- Under One Roof (album), a 1998 album by Hunters and Collectors
- Under One Roof (film), a 2002 gay-themed romantic comedy-drama
- Under One Roof, a 1946 documentary short film directed by Lewis Gilbert
- Under One Roof, a 1917 novel by Mary Cholmondeley
- Under One Roof, a 1976 song by The Rubettes
