= Sins of the Father (Big Love) =

- Big Love episode
- Episode no.: Season 4 Episode 5
- Directed by: David Petrarca
- Written by: Seth Greenland
- Cinematography by: Anette Haellmigk
- Editing by: Chris Figler
- Original release date: February 7, 2010
- Running time: 56 minutes

Guest appearances
- Sissy Spacek as Marilyn Densham; Bruce Dern as Frank Harlow; Douglas Smith as Ben Henrickson; Adam Beach as Tommy Flute; Perry King as George Paley; Tom Amandes as Roy Colburn; David Andriole as Political Strategist; Robert Curtis Brown as Stake President Kennedy; Patrick Fabian as Ted Price; Michele Greene as Sheila Jackson White; Judith Hoag as Cindy Price; Bella Thorne as Tancy "Teenie" Henrickson

Episode chronology
← Previous "The Mighty and Strong"	Next → "Under One Roof"

"Sins of the Father" is the fifth episode of the fourth season of the American drama television series Big Love. It is the 39th overall episode of the series and was written by co-producer Seth Greenland, and directed by David Petrarca. It originally aired on HBO on February 7, 2010.

The series is set in Salt Lake City and follows Bill Henrickson, a fundamentalist Mormon. He practices polygamy, having Barbara, Nicki and Margie as his wives. The series charts the family's life in and out of the public sphere in their suburb, as well as their associations with a fundamentalist compound in the area. In the episode, Bill hosts a party to support his state senate nomination, while the family debates over Ben's absence.

According to Nielsen Media Research, the episode was seen by an estimated 1.31 million household viewers and gained a 0.6/1 ratings share among adults aged 18–49. The episode received mixed reviews from critics, with critics polarized over Bill's storyline.

== Plot ==
Bill (Bill Paxton) and Barbara (Jeanne Tripplehorn) host many events to support his electoral run. However, Barbara discovers that Margie (Ginnifer Goodwin) admitted to have true romantic feelings for Ben (Douglas Smith), straining their relationship. Ben, in turn, has moved in with Sarah (Amanda Seyfried).

As the Henricksons prepare to attend a party event at school, tensions arise between Barbara and Margie when the former accuses her of causing Ben to leave the house. While Paley (Perry King) endorses Bill's candidacy, Colburn (Tom Amandes) gives a speech condemning the Lost Boys, a gang from Juniper Creek which had Bill in his youth. However, Marilyn (Sissy Spacek) unexpectedly shows up and asks Bill for a place in his casino to get more endorsements. Bill reluctantly takes her to the casino, introducing her to Tommy (Adam Beach). However, Tommy surprises Marilyn by dismissing all her propositions. Seeing Barbara's stress, Tommy decides to take her to his sweat lodge, where he opens up about the death of his wife and children and how he moved on with his life.

At the casino, Bill is annoyed to see that Frank (Bruce Dern) and Lois (Grace Zabriskie) have decided to make a quick stop, and Frank ends up getting into a fight with Joey (Shawn Doyle). Bill takes him outside and attacks his father, causing Lois to scold him for his actions. She also reveals that she knows he banished Ben, horrifying Joey, who condemns him as this was the exact same actions that happened to Bill in his youth. Bill then leaves the casino and goes to the morgue, deciding to pay for the burial of a deceased Lost Boy who was condemned by Colburn.

Bill and Barbara return to the school, discovering mugshots of a young Bill arrested. This shocks Sarah and Teenie (Bella Thorne), who were unaware of their father's young life. Before a debate, Bill apologizes to Margie for his treatment, but is disappointed when Ben does not show up. At the debate, Colburn uses the mugshots to speak badly of Bill. Bill acknowledges his past, but uses his speech to ask for help for similar Lost Boys, hoping they can get a better life than his past. Later, Bill is informed that he won the nomination. However, he is visited by Marilyn, who discovered that Bill talked badly of her to Tommy, but promises to be part of the casino. Bill is also told by Sarah that Ben chose to leave with Lois, devastating him and Barbara.

== Production ==
=== Development ===
The episode was written by co-producer Seth Greenland, and directed by David Petrarca. This was Greenland's first writing credit, and Petrarca's second directing credit.

== Reception ==
=== Viewers ===
In its original American broadcast, "Sins of the Father" was seen by an estimated 1.31 million household viewers with a 0.6/1 in the 18–49 demographics. This means that 0.6 percent of all households with televisions watched the episode, while 1 percent of all of those watching television at the time of the broadcast watched it. This was a 14% decrease in viewership from the previous episode, which was seen by an estimated 1.52 million household viewers with a 0.7/2 in the 18–49 demographics.

=== Critical reviews ===
"Sins of the Father" received mixed reviews from critics. Amelie Gillette of The A.V. Club gave the episode a "C+" grade and wrote, "This week's episode didn't venture into Juniper Creek, Sarah's marriage and sundry subplots, JJ's machinations and at-home biopsy services, or Dale & Alby's grape jelly exchanges. Instead it was centered on the Henricksons' rangy immediate family — a narrowing of focus that is usually welcome in a rangy show like Big Love. Except this episode zeroed in mainly on Bill and his beyond moronic run for state senate, so there was a lot left to be desired."

Nick Catucci of Vulture wrote, "So, at what point does Bill pinch Christopher's nose shut, letting him choke to death, after their SUV goes off the road? And is the official reminder that Bill is a Republican, and not some successful polyamorous bohemian like we wish we were, supposed to help clue us blue-staters in to the fact that he is a bad, bad man? Because we're feeling kind of over Bill." Allyssa Lee of Los Angeles Times wrote, "Can you believe we're already more than halfway through the season, Big Love fans? And this episode, appropriately titled “Sins of the Father,” brought it all back to Bill: His lost-boy past, his current state as a husband and a father and so-called reformer, and whether he was doomed to repeat his father's transgressions by banishing his own son."

TV Fanatic gave the episode a 4.5 star rating out of 5 and wrote, "Big Love makes us feel as if we are on a speeding train that is going over 450 mph - without brakes. Only one thought keeps playing out in our minds: How will this end? Only tragically, we imagine." Mark Blankenship of HuffPost wrote, "I love this show? And I look forward to it? But this episode is not my favorite. Even though they drop Alby and Adaleen and Ghost Prophet and Wanda's CukooBananaPants Revue for a week, the writers still shove too much story in a tiny, tiny hour. Massive developments flicker by in a second, barely registering before they make way for the next crisis, and because there are so many big events, there's no sense of pacing or focus. It's just one heart attack after another."

David Petrarca submitted this episode for consideration for Outstanding Directing for a Drama Series at the 62nd Primetime Emmy Awards.
