= Under One Roof (Big Love) =

- Big Love episode
- Episode no.: Season 4 Episode 6
- Directed by: Dan Attias
- Written by: Coleman Herbert
- Cinematography by: Alex Nepomniaschy
- Editing by: Alan Cody; Byron Smith
- Original release date: February 14, 2010
- Running time: 60 minutes

Guest appearances
- Sissy Spacek as Marilyn Densham; Bruce Dern as Frank Harlow; Mary Kay Place as Adaleen Grant; Douglas Smith as Ben Henrickson; Adam Beach as Tommy Flute; Ben Koldyke as Dale Tomasson; Luke Askew as Hollis Green; Steve Bacic as Goran; Robert Beltran as Jerry Flute; Anne Dudek as Lura Grant; Melinda Page Hamilton as Malinda; Branka Katić as Ana Mesovich; Sandy Martin as Selma Green; Jim Metzler as Dick Lesterson; Peggy Miley as June Walker; William R. Moses as LDS Bishop; Mel Rodriguez as Don Dona

Episode chronology
← Previous "Sins of the Father"	Next → "Blood Atonement"

"Under One Roof" is the sixth episode of the fourth season of the American drama television series Big Love. It is the 40th overall episode of the series and was written by Coleman Herbert, and directed by producer Dan Attias. It originally aired on HBO on February 14, 2010.

The series is set in Salt Lake City and follows Bill Henrickson, a fundamentalist Mormon. He practices polygamy, having Barbara, Nicki and Margie as his wives. The series charts the family's life in and out of the public sphere in their suburb, as well as their associations with a fundamentalist compound in the area. In the episode, the Henricksons reunite with a pregnant Ana, while Ben accompanies his grandparents to Mexico.

According to Nielsen Media Research, the episode was seen by an estimated 1.50 million household viewers and gained a 0.6/2 ratings share among adults aged 18–49. The episode received mostly positive reviews from critics, who praised the storylines and ending.

== Plot ==
While dining, Bill (Bill Paxton) and Barbara (Jeanne Tripplehorn) are surprised to find Ana (Branka Katić) working as a waitress. They are shocked to find her pregnant, and she confirms Bill is the father. Barbara wants to get involved to financially support her, but Nicki (Chloë Sevigny) is convinced that Ana is trying to con the family. Bill visits Ana to ask to be in his child's life, but she hesitates.

In Mexico, Ben (Douglas Smith) accompanies Frank (Bruce Dern), Lois (Grace Zabriskie) and Jodean (Mireille Enos) in their bird smuggling business. As they await for their supplier to hand over the birds, they are called by Bill, who demands to talk with Ben. Lois refuses, and lies by claiming they are heading for Wyoming. They go back to meet with the supplier, Don Dona (Mel Rodriguez), but he gets into an argument with Frank. However, they are ambushed by Hollis (Luke Askew) and Selma Green (Sandy Martin), who was released from prison. Having set them up, the Greenes take Ben, Frank, Lois and Jodean hostage.

Bill hopes to expand the Blackfoot Magic Casino into Idaho, but neither Jerry (Robert Beltran) nor Tommy (Adam Beach) are convinced. Marilyn (Sissy Spacek) gets an opportunity to make a pitch meeting, but Bill makes it clear he will not support her. He also meets with Dale (Ben Koldyke), questioning him if he has been seeing Alby (Matt Ross). Dale confirms it, and Bill tells him that he needs to stop as Alby is dangerous. Just as Alby buys a department for sex encounters with Dale in the city, Lura (Anne Dudek) discloses their relationship to the public and Dale's wife, causing Dale to quit from the UEB board. Nicki crashes the hotel where Adaleen (Mary Kay Place) and J.J. (Željko Ivanek) to rescue Cara Lynn (Cassi Thomson) from getting engaged to an older man, threatening to kill J.J. if he contacts her again.

Ana contacts Bill, offering him right to constantly visit his child if he can financially help her. Bill agrees to her terms, but Ana makes it clear she only wants to see him and not get involved with his wives. Barbara confronts her, finding that she is staying with her fiancé Goran (Steve Bacic). Ana then reveals that while the baby is Bill's, it was conceived before their marriage, horrifying Barbara. She signs Marilyn's contract to get her hired, as Marilyn wins over the Flutes by claiming she can help them in convincing the Evangelicals in legalizing gambling. When Barbara scolds him for just thinking on himself, Bill takes her, Nicki and Margie (Ginnifer Goodwin) to a large house where he plans for his whole family to live together without fear. Alby arrives at the department to meet with Dale, but is horrified to discover that Dale has committed suicide.

== Production ==
=== Development ===
The episode was written by Coleman Herbert, and directed by producer Dan Attias. This was Herbert's second writing credit, and Attias' eighth directing credit.

== Reception ==
=== Viewers ===
In its original American broadcast, "Under One Roof" was seen by an estimated 1.50 million household viewers with a 0.6/2 in the 18–49 demographics. This means that 0.6 percent of all households with televisions watched the episode, while 2 percent of all of those watching television at the time of the broadcast watched it. This was a 14% increase in viewership from the previous episode, which was seen by an estimated 1.31 million household viewers with a 0.6/1 in the 18–49 demographics.

=== Critical reviews ===
"Under One Roof" received mostly positive reviews from critics. Scott Tobias of The A.V. Club gave the episode an "A–" grade and wrote, "“Under One Roof” didn't exactly cut the calories — in fact, it added yet another major headache for Bill and the wives — but it did give the right scenes the weight they deserved, and packed a serious emotional wallop in the end."

Alan Sepinwall wrote, "Gotta say that the show at the moment is feeling way, way too busy for me, with Bill's idiotic political campaign on top of the casino problems, whatever JJ's up to, Alby, and tonight's return of several old characters."

Nick Catucci of Vulture wrote, "this episode, Bill proves himself a true politician, making every easy, flawed compromise, grabbing for money, vindictively lashing out, and woodenly apologizing for his sexual misadventures. But others actually dominate this terrific, messy ep, which sees the past burbling up like so much swamp gas — and a semi-shocking end to this season's most intriguing story line." Allyssa Lee of Los Angeles Times wrote, "maybe the writers were trying to give us the best Presidential Olympic Valentine Year of the Tiger gift ever, because “Under One Roof” was pretty great – it fired on all cylinders and had a super strong finish."

TV Fanatic gave the episode a 4.5 star rating out of 5 and wrote, "We loved that Bill was able to show his family his big dream house. We've always felt that his intentions were pure, but why the sneakiness? What a tangled web Bill weaves. Bill is clearly not the only guy with his hands full. It seemed like everyone in "Under One Roof" had so much drama to deal with." Mark Blankenship of HuffPost wrote, "After the overpacked clown car that was last week's installment, "Under One Roof" is a relief. There's still a whole lot of shakin' goin' on, but it's easier to tell whose hips are whose."

Coleman Herbert submitted this episode for consideration for Outstanding Writing for a Drama Series at the 62nd Primetime Emmy Awards.
