= The Colt (film) =

2005 American television movie

- Written by: Mikhail Sholokhov; Stephen Harrigan
- Directed by: Yelena Lanskaya
- Starring: Ryan Merriman; Phyllis George; Steve Bacic; William MacDonald; Steve Martin; Darcy Belsher
- Country of origin: United States
- Original language: English

Production
- Producer: Matthew O'Connor
- Running time: 120 minutes

Original release
- Network: Hallmark Channel
- Release: February 6, 2005

The Colt is a 2005 television movie made for Hallmark Channel. The film is set during the American Civil War, and is based on the short story (Жеребёнок, Zherebyonok) by Nobel Prize winner Mikhail Sholokhov.

== Plot ==
In 1864, an American Civil War troop struggles to survive when young Union soldier Jim Rabb (Ryan Merriman) discovers that his mare has given birth to a colt. A superior officer orders Jim to shoot the foal because it may become a burden, but Jim - seeing the colt as a sign of hope and a reminder of the beauty of life - refuses. The colt remains with the men as they battle. When Confederates overtake the camp and steal the colt, Jim must risk his life retrieving it.

== Cast ==
- Ryan Merriman as Jim Rabb
- Steve Bacic as Sgt. Longacre
- William MacDonald as Sgt. Woodruff
- Darcy Belsher as Convington
- Scott Heindl as Lt. Hutton

== Critical reviews ==
Hal Erickson of All Movie Guide called the film "an uplifting tale of unassailable innocence in the midst of America's bloodiest war."

South Coast Today praised the film, saying its "symbolism is never so heavy-handed as to obscure an intelligent film filled with fine performances."

== Awards ==
=== Won ===
- 2005 FAIF International Film Festival, Judges Choice Award for Best Feature Film
- 2005 LA Femme Film Festival, Best Director
- 2005 WorldFest Houston, Special Jury Award for Feature Made for Television/Cable

=== Nominated ===
- 2006 Humanitas Prize, 90 Minute or Longer Category
- 2006 Writers Guild of America, USA, WGA Award (TV) Long Form - Adapted

== See also ==
- List of films about horses
