= Arnold Schwarzenegger filmography =

Performances by Austrian and American actor

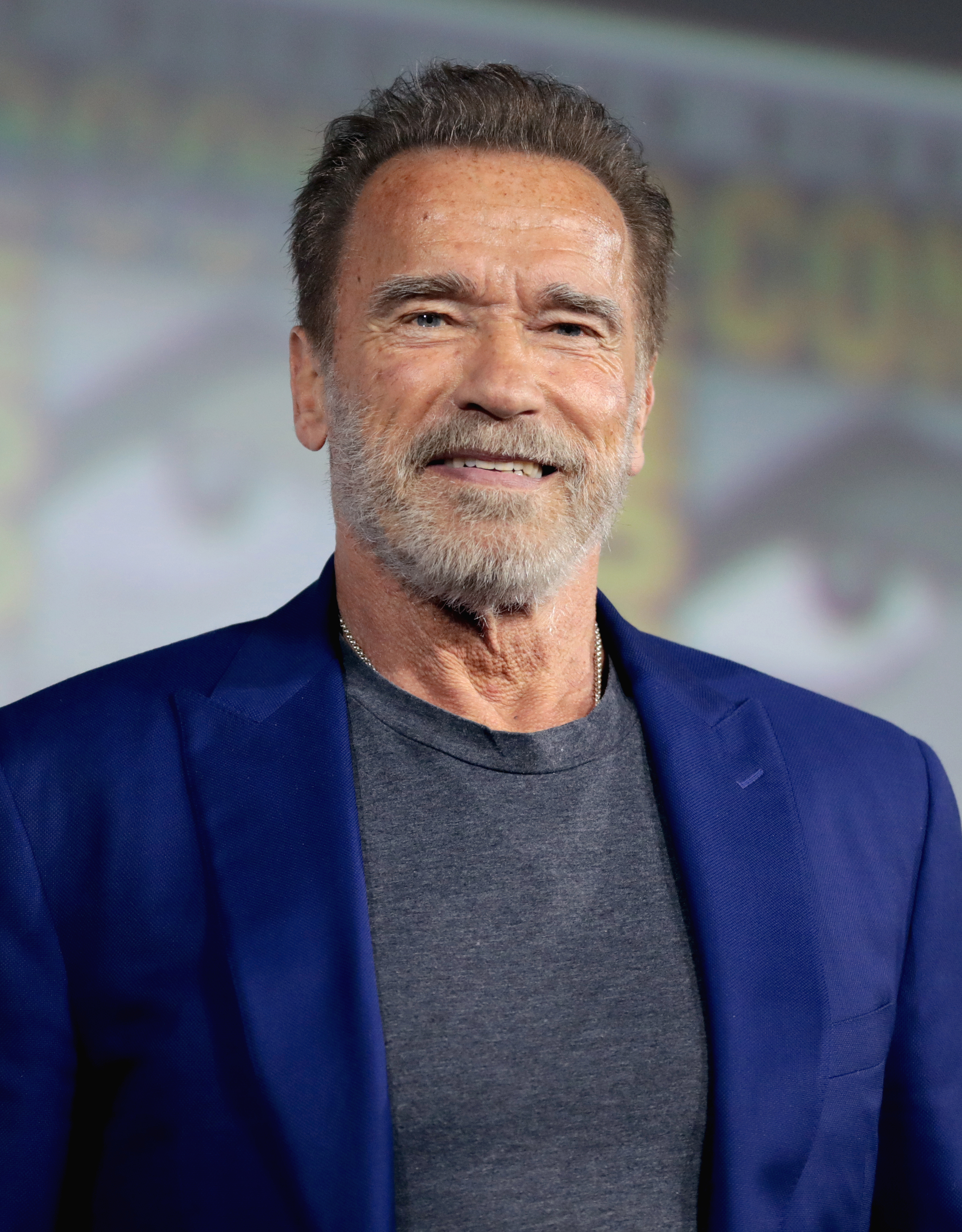
Schwarzenegger at the 2019 San Diego Comic-Con

Austrian and American actor, film producer, businessman, retired professional bodybuilder and politician Arnold Schwarzenegger has appeared in over 51 films, and has also ventured into directing and producing. He began his acting career primarily with small roles in film and television starting in 1969. For his first film role, he was credited as "Arnold Strong", but was credited with his birth name thereafter. He has appeared mainly in action and comedy films. In addition to films and television, he has appeared in music videos for AC/DC, Bon Jovi, and Guns N' Roses.

In the 1980s, Schwarzenegger became his primary character in two film franchises: as Conan in the Conan series and as The Terminator in the Terminator series. His other film roles include Commando, The Running Man, Predator, Total Recall, Last Action Hero and True Lies. Although Schwarzenegger's acting career was put on hiatus due to his position as governor of California, he also made several cameos in various films while in office, including The Kid & I and The Expendables. On February 11, 2011, just over a month after leaving office, Schwarzenegger announced he would return to acting.

Schwarzenegger has received several awards and nominations for his work in films. In Stay Hungry, one of his early roles, he won a Golden Globe Award for Best Acting Debut in a Motion Picture. He has also been nominated for various awards for his roles in Terminator 2: Judgment Day, Junior, and True Lies. According to Box Office Mojo, a box office revenue tracking website, films in which Schwarzenegger has acted have grossed a total of more than $1.7 billion within the United States, with an average of $67 million per film and total $4.0 billion worldwide. According to The Numbers, another box office revenue tracking website, films in which Schwarzenegger has acted have total grossed around $4.5 billion worldwide.

== Film ==
Year	Title	Role	Notes	Ref.
1970	Hercules in New York	Hercules	Credited as Arnold Strong "Mr. Universe"	
1973	The Long Goodbye	Hood in Augustine's Office	Uncredited	
1976	Stay Hungry	Joe Santo		
1977	Pumping Iron	Himself		
1979	The Villain	"Handsome Stranger"		
1979	Scavenger Hunt	Lars		
1982	Conan the Barbarian	Conan		
1984	Conan the Destroyer	Conan		
1984	The Terminator	The Terminator		
1985	Red Sonja	Lord Kalidor		
1985	Commando	Colonel John Matrix		
1986	Raw Deal	Sheriff Mark Kaminsky / Joseph P. Brenner		
1987	Predator	Major Alan "Dutch" Schaefer		
1987	The Running Man	Captain Benjamin Stuart "Ben" Richards		
1988	Red Heat	Captain Ivan Danko		
1988	Twins	Julius Benedict		
1990	Total Recall	Douglas "Doug" Quaid / Agent Carl Hauser		
1990	Kindergarten Cop	LAPD Detective John Kimble		
1991	Terminator 2: Judgment Day	The Terminator		
1993	Dave	Himself	Cameo	
1993	Last Action Hero	Detective Jack Slater / Himself / Hamlet	Also executive producer	
1993	Beretta's Island	Himself	Direct-to-video; cameo	
1994	True Lies	Agent Harry Tasker / Harry Rehnquist		
1994	Junior	Dr. Alexander "Alex" Hesse		
1996	T2-3D: Battle Across Time	The Terminator	Theme park attraction	
1996	Eraser	U.S. Marshal John "Eraser" Kruger		
1996	Jingle All the Way	Howard Langston		
1997	Batman & Robin	Dr. Victor Fries / Mr. Freeze		
1999	End of Days	Detective Jericho Cane		
2000	The 6th Day	Adam Gibson / Adam Gibson Clone	Also producer	
2001	Dr. Dolittle 2	Arctic Wolf (voice)	Uncredited	
2002	Collateral Damage	Captain Gordon "Gordy" Brewer		
2003	Terminator 3: Rise of the Machines	The Terminator		
2003	The Rundown	Bar Patron	Uncredited cameo	
2004	Around the World in 80 Days	Prince Hapi		
2005	The Kid & I	Himself	Cameo	
2009	Terminator Salvation	The Terminator	Likeness only	
2010	The Expendables	Trent "Trench" Mauser	Uncredited cameo	
2012	The Expendables 2	Trent "Trench" Mauser		
2013	The Last Stand	Sheriff Ray Owens		
2013	Escape Plan	Emil Rottmayer / Victor X. Mannheim		
2014	Sabotage	Agent John "Breacher" Wharton		
2014	The Expendables 3	Trent "Trench" Mauser		
2015	Maggie	Wade Vogel	Also producer	
2015	Terminator Genisys	Terminator / Guardian		
2017	Aftermath	Roman Melnyk	Also producer	
2017	Wonders of the Sea 3D	Himself - Narrator	Documentary film; also producer	
2017	Killing Gunther	Robert "Gunther" Bendik	Also executive producer	
2018	The Game Changers	Himself	Documentary film; also executive producer	
2019	Viy 2: Journey to China	Captain James Hook	Also executive producer	
2019	Terminator: Dark Fate	T-800 / Carl		
2025	Predator: Killer of Killers	Major Alan "Dutch" Schaefer	Cameo; likeness only	
2026	The Man with the Bag †	Santa Claus	Post-production	
TBA	Kung Fury 2 †	"The President"	Completed	
TBA	The Kellys †	TBA	Filming	

Key
†	Denotes films that have not yet been released

== Television ==
Year	Title	Role	Notes	Ref.
1974	Happy Anniversary and Goodbye	Rico	Television film	
1977	The Streets of San Francisco	Josef Schmidt	Episode: "Dead Lift"	
1977	The San Pedro Beach Bums	Muscleman	Episode: "Lifting Is My Life"	
1980	The Jayne Mansfield Story	Mickey Hargitay	Television film	
1990	Tales from the Crypt	X-Con / Himself	Episode: "The Switch"; uncredited cameo; also director	
1992	Christmas in Connecticut	Man in Chair in Front of Media Truck	Television film; uncredited cameo; also director	
1992	Lincoln	John George Nicolay (voice)	Television film	
2002–2003	Liberty's Kids	Baron Friedrich Wilhelm von Steuben (voice)	2 episodes	
2014–2016	Years of Living Dangerously	Himself	2 episodes; documentary series; also executive producer	
2015	Two and a Half Men	Lieutenant Wagner	Episode: "Of Course He's Dead: Part 1 & 2"	
2015	Epic Rap Battles of History	Terminator Announcer (voice)	Episode: "Terminator vs. RoboCop"; uncredited cameo	
2017	The New Celebrity Apprentice	Himself - Host	8 episodes; also executive producer	
2021	Superhero Kindergarten	Arnold Armstrong / Captain Fantastic (voice)	26 episodes; also executive producer	
2022	Little Demon	Game Show Host (voice)	Episode: "Everybody's Dying for the Weekend"	
2023	Arnold	Himself	3 episodes; documentary series	
2023–2025	FUBAR	Luke Brunner	16 episodes; also executive producer	
2024	Secret Level	King Aelstrom (voice)	Episode: "New World: The Once and Future King"	

== Commercials ==
Year	Title	Role	Notes	Ref.
1990-1991	Nissin Cup Noodle	Himself		
1996	Terminator 2 3D: Battle Across Time Commercial	The Terminator		
2014	Bud Light: Ian Up for Whatever	Himself		
2015	WWE 2K16 - Arnold Schwarzenegger Terminator Commercial	The Terminator		
2022	BMW: Zeus & Hera	Thunder Zeus		
2022	World of Tanks: Holiday Ops	Himself		
2023	Netflix	Himself		
2023	Parkside	Himself		
2024	Agent State Farm	Agent State Farm/Himself		
2025	Parkside	Himself		

== Music videos ==
Year	Title	Role	Performer	Notes	Ref.
1982	"Don't Call It Love"	Bodybuilder	Girlschool	Cameo	
1985	"Stop the Madness"	Himself	Tim Reid	Cameo	
1991	"You Could Be Mine"	T-800	Guns N' Roses		
1993	"Big Gun"	Himself	AC/DC		
2000	"Say It Isn't So"	Himself	Bon Jovi	Uncredited cameo	
2019	"Pump It Up (The Motivation Song)"	Himself	Andreas Gabalier Feat. Arnold Schwarzenegger		

== Soundtrack appearances ==
Year	Title	Song	Notes	Ref.
2017	Killing Gunther	"Earthquake Love"		
2017	Kain's Quest	"Main Title (Terminator 2 Theme)"	Episode: "The Terminator"; uncredited	

== Video games ==
Year	Title	Role	Notes	Ref.
1991	Terminator 2: Judgment Day	The Terminator		
2003	Terminator 3: Rise of the Machines	The Terminator		
2003	Terminator 3: War of the Machines	The Terminator		
2003	Terminator 3: The Redemption	The Terminator		
2014	Family Guy: The Quest for Stuff	Himself (voice)		
2019	Mortal Kombat 11	The Terminator	Playable DLC character; Likeness only	
2020	Predator: Hunting Grounds	Major Alan "Dutch" Schaefer (voice)		
2022	Call of Duty: Vanguard	The Terminator	Likeness only	
2025	Mortal Kombat 1	Conan the Barbarian	Playable DLC character; Likeness only	
2025	Call of Duty: Black Ops 6	The Terminator	Likeness only	
2026	The Man with the Bag - Naughty or Nice	Santa Claus	AI voice and likeness only	

== See also ==
- List of awards and nominations received by Arnold Schwarzenegger
