= She Made Them Do It =

2013 television film

- Directed by: Grant Harvey
- Starring: Jenna Dewan; Mackenzie Phillips; Steve Bacic

Original release
- Network: Lifetime
- Release: December 2012

She Made Them Do It is a Canadian telefilm based on the true story of American murderer Sarah Jo Pender. It was directed by Grant Harvey and stars Jenna Dewan, Mackenzie Phillips and Steve Bacic. It premiered on the Lifetime Network in December 2012.

== Plot ==
In Indiana, Sarah Jo Pender, a student, is sent to prison after her two roommates were murdered by her boyfriend Rick. She claims her innocence. After one of her appeals is denied, she escapes with the help of prison guard Scott Spitler and her friend Jamie Long. The Marshall Sean Harlan unsuccessfully pursues her and has to rely on the help of TV show America's Most Wanted. After Pender is captured by local police officers, he picks her up and drives her back to prison.

== Cast ==
- Jenna Dewan-Tatum: Sarah Jo Pender
- MacKenzie Phillips: Jamie Long
- Steve Bacic: Marshall Sean Harlan
- Nels Lennarson: Scott Spitler Sr
- Greyston Holt: Rick
- John Walsh: himself
