= A Seat at the Table (Big Love) =

- Big Love episode
- Episode no.: Season 5 Episode 2
- Directed by: Adam Davidson
- Written by: Julia Cho
- Cinematography by: Anette Haellmigk
- Editing by: Chris Figler
- Original release date: January 23, 2011
- Running time: 58 minutes

Guest appearances
- Ellen Burstyn as Nancy Dutton; Gregory Itzin as Senator Barn; Joel McKinnon Miller as Don Embry; Robert Patrick as Bud Mayberry; Steve Bacic as Goran; Christian Campbell as Greg Ivey; Mariette Hartley as Major; Branka Katić as Ana Mesovich; Cody Klop as Gary Embry; Kate McNeil as Sister Mary; Lenny Schmidt as Stuff Member; Amy Sloan as Mitch

Episode chronology
← Previous "Winter"	Next → "Certain Poor Shepherds"

"A Seat at the Table" is the second episode of the fifth season of the American drama television series Big Love. It is the 45th overall episode of the series and was written by Julia Cho, and directed by Adam Davidson. It originally aired on HBO on January 23, 2011.

The series is set in Salt Lake City and follows Bill Henrickson, a fundamentalist Mormon. He practices polygamy, having Barbara, Nicki and Margie as his wives. The series charts the family's life in and out of the public sphere in their suburb, as well as their associations with a fundamentalist compound in the area. In the episode, Bill summons the polygamist leaders to form a project, while Barbara convinces her mother in accompanying her to an event.

According to Nielsen Media Research, the episode was seen by an estimated 1.12 million household viewers and gained a 0.5/1 ratings share among adults aged 18–49. The episode received very positive reviews from critics, who praised the conflicts and writing on the episode.

== Plot ==
Bill (Bill Paxton) creates a Safety Net project to unite other polygamist leaders in the area, hoping to build more awareness and support. Barbara (Jeanne Tripplehorn) visits Nancy (Ellen Burstyn), asking her to accompany her to a mother-daughter symposium. Despite her reservations, she agrees to go, although she is mad that the symposium revolves around excommunication.

Worried that Ana (Branka Katić) and Goran (Steve Bacic) are becoming a bad influence on Margie (Ginnifer Goodwin), Bill decides to help their transition easier by buying them plane tickets. As Margie tries to get Ana to stay, she accidentally causes her to fall, although she is fine. Bill hosts the first meeting with the leaders, joined by Alby (Matt Ross) through videochat. However, Alby causes a huge argument over the education of girls, and Bill loses support as they feel he is not honest over his plans. At the symposium, Barbara and Nancy get into a conflict when Nancy blames Barbara's polygamy for her life falling apart, and angrily leaves the symposium.

Cara Lynn (Cassi Thomson) wins a local math competition, and Nicki (Chloë Sevigny) decides to have her spend more time studying with her teacher, Greg Ivey (Christian Campbell), hoping she stops seeing Gary (Luke Klop). Bill is disappointed to learn that his only interested colleague in the Capitol chose to pass the polygamy legislation, angering his supporters even more. Discovering that Barbara gave Cara Lynn a copy of Our Bodies, Ourselves, Nicki insults her. She later reconciles with her, and they dance during a class. Ana and Goran leave the country, but Margie ultimately decides it was the best choice.

== Production ==
=== Development ===
The episode was written by Julia Cho, and directed by Adam Davidson. This was Cho's second writing credit, and Davidson's fourth directing credit.

== Reception ==
=== Viewers ===
In its original American broadcast, "A Seat at the Table" was seen by an estimated 1.12 million household viewers with a 0.5/1 in the 18–49 demographics. This means that 0.5 percent of all households with televisions watched the episode, while 1 percent of all of those watching television at the time of the broadcast watched it. This was a slight decrease in viewership from the previous episode, which was seen by an estimated 1.21 million household viewers with a 0.5/1 in the 18–49 demographics.

=== Critical reviews ===
"A Seat at the Table" received very positive reviews from critics. Emily St. James of The A.V. Club gave the episode an "A–" grade and wrote, "After a season premiere that was pretty good but not as good as this show is capable of, it was a relief to see that “A Seat At The Table,” despite being slightly too overstuffed, was a reminder of just how good Big Love can be when it’s being good."

Alan Sepinwall of HitFix wrote, "I'll note is that this is the second episode in a row to climax with Bill seeming to accept that his decisions in life may not have been the wisest. (Here it was in his offer to Margene.) I still wonder how sincere any of it is, though."

James Poniewozik of TIME wrote, "It's at times like this when a family needs to pull together, but it's not clear that the Henricksons, and their own various families, can do that. As Barb's mother says, “There’s a vast difference between ‘I need you, Mommy’ and ‘I need something from you.'” But either way, in this episode, those requests, over and over again, went unfulfilled." Megan Angelo of The Wall Street Journal wrote, "Just two episodes in, it's clear that unhappy faces are the official theme of the show's final season. Tonight, Bill made lots of wide, horrified eyes. Barb glared; Nicki grimaced; Margene bawled."

Aileen Gallagher of Vulture wrote, "The writers of Big Love dipped deep into their anguish well to craft last night's crushing episode. Last week the Henricksons were all alone, and this week they sought solace outside the family only to find rejection and threats of dissolution. This center cannot hold." Allyssa Lee of Los Angeles Times wrote, "So everyone's growing, and it's like all the members of the family, as they evolve and change, need to re-learn how to deal and be with one another. So how fitting was it that Nicki, in an effort to make peace with Barb, visited her in her fortress of solitude, the dance studio, and allowed Barb to lead and show her how to move to the music? Let's hope these are the baby steps to a new and improved partnership."

TV Fanatic gave the episode a 4 star rating out of 5 and wrote, "Only two episodes into the final season and so much has already happened. I know we are just at the tip of the iceberg with everything and can't wait to see what happens next week." Mark Blankenship of HuffPost wrote, "This week's episode, "A Seat At The Table," rivals "Come, Ye Saints" from Season Three as the most elegant and satisfying in the series. Like the older installment - which included landmines like Sarah's miscarriage - this one uses major events to tease out larger themes. It succeeds both as character-driven drama and spiritually resonant rumination."
