= The 6th Day =

2000 film directed by Roger Spottiswoode

- Theatrical release poster
- Directed by: Roger Spottiswoode
- Written by: Cormac Wibberley; Marianne Wibberley
- Produced by: Jon Davison; Mike Medavoy; Arnold Schwarzenegger
- Starring: Arnold Schwarzenegger; Michael Rapaport; Tony Goldwyn; Michael Rooker; Sarah Wynter; Robert Duvall
- Cinematography: Pierre Mignot
- Edited by: Michel Arcand; Mark Conte; Dominique Fortin
- Music by: Trevor Rabin
- Production companies: Phoenix Pictures; Columbia Pictures
- Distributed by: Sony Pictures Releasing
- Release dates: October 28, 2000 (Tokyo); November 17, 2000 (United States)
- Running time: 124 minutes
- Country: United States
- Language: English
- Budget: $82 million
- Box office: $96 million

The 6th Day is a 2000 American science fiction action film directed by Roger Spottiswoode, and starring Arnold Schwarzenegger, Tony Goldwyn, Michael Rapaport, Michael Rooker, Sarah Wynter, Robert Duvall, and Terry Crews in his film debut. In the film, a family man of the future is illegally cloned by accident as part of a vast conspiracy involving a shady billionaire businessman and is thrust into a struggle to clear his name and protect his family from the conspirators who seek to keep the cloning a secret.

The title refers to the Genesis creation narrative shared among the Abrahamic religions, where God created humanity on the sixth day of the universe's existence.

Schwarzenegger received a salary of $25 million for his role in the film. The film received mixed reviews and grossed $96 million worldwide on a total budget of $82 million.

== Plot ==
Following the successful cloning of Dolly the sheep in the 1990s, artificial cloning of animals has become commonplace by 2015. Human cloning is prohibited by "Sixth Day" laws, following a botched attempt.

Charter pilot Adam Gibson is hired for a snowboarding excursion by Michael Drucker, billionaire owner of cloning corporation Replacement Technologies, who requires him to undergo a seemingly routine drug test. When Adam's wife informs him that their daughter's dog has died, he reluctantly visits one of Drucker's “RePet” cloning stores, while his partner Hank poses as Adam and flies Drucker to the mountains, where they are killed by an assassin, Tripp.

Buying a life-size animatronic “SimPal” doll for his daughter instead, Adam returns home to discover a clone of himself with his family. Before he can intervene, Adam is abducted by Marshall, Drucker's head of security, and his agents Talia, Vincent, and Wiley. Adam escapes, killing Talia and Wiley, and goes to the police but is believed to be an escaped mental patient.

Drucker, somehow alive, assures reporters that he does not intend to have the Sixth Day laws repealed. However, he and his chief scientist, Dr. Griffin Weir, have secretly already perfected illegal human cloning and revive clones of Talia and Wiley. Adam breaks out of the police station and is forced to kill Wiley again, before finding Hank at his apartment, still alive. He brings Hank to his house and contemplates killing his clone but has second thoughts and reconsiders. Marshall and Talia arrive, forcing Adam to pose as his clone to send them away.

Returning to his apartment, Hank is again killed by Tripp, who is shot by Adam. A dying Tripp reveals he is an anti-cloning extremist who assassinated Drucker, the latter being subsequently cloned along with Hank. Marshall and Talia arrive, but Adam escapes in their vehicle after shooting off Talia's fingers, taking her thumb to bypass the car's biometric lock. Adam uses the thumb to sneak into Replacement Technologies and confronts Dr. Weir, whose pursuit of cloning is driven by his wife Katherine's cystic fibrosis. She reveals to her husband that she knows she is the latest in a series of clones he has made in an attempt to cure her.

Weir explains that the blood and vision tests Adam underwent scanned his DNA and memories — captured as a “syncording” — in the event he needed to be cloned. He reveals Drucker was secretly cloned after dying years earlier to maintain control of his fortune, as clones have no legal rights. Believing both Adam and Hank were killed alongside Drucker, Weir cloned them to return to their lives and cover up Drucker's murder and second cloning. Weir gives Adam the syncording proving Drucker has been cloned, warning that he may go after Adam's clone and family.

Adam races to Clara's school recital, where Talia and Vincent have already abducted his wife and daughter. Coming face-to-face with his own clone, Adam reveals their situation and agrees to deliver the incriminating syncording to Drucker in exchange for his family. Weir confronts Drucker, who engineered the clones, including Katherine, with shortened lifespans as an insurance policy against betrayal. Drucker kills Weir, promising to resurrect him and Katherine as clones.

Sending a decoy helicopter to be destroyed, Adam lands on Drucker's helipad and wreaks havoc until he is captured. Drucker reveals that Adam is actually the clone, proven by a marking inside his eyelid, but realizes the real Adam has also infiltrated the building. While the original Adam rescues his family, his clone fights off Drucker's agents, hanging Talia and drowning Marshall while Drucker himself kills Wiley for accidentally shooting him. The mortally wounded Drucker clones himself again, but the malfunctioning equipment creates a deformed, incomplete body. Adam and his clone escape in the helicopter with his family, destroying the facility and all its syncordings as Drucker's newest clone falls to his death.

The real Adam arranges for his clone, who is discovered to not have a shortened lifespan like the other clones, to start a new life in Argentina, running a satellite office of their charter business. As a parting gift, the clone gives the family Hank's RePet cat, and the real Adam gives his clone a flying send-off.

== Cast ==
- Arnold Schwarzenegger as Adam Gibson / Adam Gibson Clone
- Tony Goldwyn as Michael Drucker, the CEO of Replacement Technologies
- Michael Rapaport as Hank Morgan, Adam's best friend
- Michael Rooker as Robert Marshall, a Millennium security agent and Drucker's right-hand man
- Sarah Wynter as Talia Elsworth, an assassin working for Drucker
- Wendy Crewson as Natalie Gibson, Adam's wife
- Rodney Rowland as P. Wiley, an assassin working for Drucker
- Terry Crews as Vincent Bansworth, an assassin working for Drucker
- Ken Pogue as Speaker Day
- Colin Cunningham as Tripp, a religious fundamentalist strongly against cloning
- Robert Duvall as Dr. Griffin Weir, Drucker's scientist in charge of the cloning
- Wanda Cannon as Katherine Weir, Griffin's wife
- Taylor Anne Reid as Clara Gibson, Adam's daughter
- Jennifer Gareis as Virtual Girlfriend
- Andrea Libman as the voice of SimPal Cindy
- Steve Bacic as Johnny Phoenix, a football player who is cloned after dying in game

== Production ==
Joe Dante was initially attached to direct the film, before Arnold Schwarzenegger signed on to star.

The 6th Day was filmed in Vancouver, British Columbia, Canada and Toronto, Ontario, Canada.

== Release ==
=== Theatrical ===
The 6th Day premiered at the Tokyo International Film Festival. It was released theatrically on November 17, 2000.

=== Home media ===
The 6th Day was released on VHS and DVD in the United States and Canada on March 27, 2001. The film was released on video on the following dates:

Release date	Territory	Format	Notes
January 22, 2002	U.S. and Canada	DVD	Special Edition
October 28, 2003	U.S. and Canada	DVD	Schwarzenegger Action Pack: The 6th Day and Last Action Hero

A Blu-ray version was released in the United States and Canada on April 8, 2008. It includes two featurettes but lacks the commentary from the DVD release.

== Reception ==
=== Box office ===
The film opened at #4 behind How the Grinch Stole Christmas, Charlie's Angels and Rugrats in Paris: The Movie, grossing $13 million in its opening weekend. It eventually grossed $57 million in North America (including Mexico) and $96 million worldwide, while Variety reports $116 million. The film grossed $126.3 million (worldwide) on its first release and $18 million on its re--release increasing the total to $144.3 million.

=== Critical response ===
On Rotten Tomatoes, the film has an approval rating of 40% based on reviews from 117 critics, with a rating of 5.9/10. The site's consensus reads: "This offering from Arnold Schwarzenegger contains an intriguing, disturbing premise, but the film's execution is too routine and formulaic to make good use of it." On Metacritic, the film has a score of 49 out of 100 based on reviews from 30 critics. Audiences polled by CinemaScore gave the film an average grade of "C" on an A+ to F scale.

Roger Ebert of the Chicago Sun-Times gave The 6th Day three out of four stars, remarking that it is not in the same league as Total Recall and Terminator 2: Judgment Day, but that it nevertheless qualifies as a serious science fiction film. He also found problems with the cloning as depicted in the film, saying that "[his] problem with both processes is that while the resulting clone ... might know everything I know ... I myself would still be over here in the old container." Kenneth Turan of the Los Angeles Times disliked the generic appearance of the film and Schwarzenegger's typecasting as an action hero. He gave the film two out of five stars. Todd McCarthy of Variety called it: "A mostly standard-issue latter-day Arnold Schwarzenegger actioner spiked with a creepily plausible cloning angle." Steve Murray of Atlanta Journal-Constitution gave the film a "C+", describing it as "a clone itself, borrowing elements from Arnold's Total Recall, plus a few ideas from Blade Runner and Face/Off, all of which are much better movies."

=== Accolades ===
The 6th Day earned three Razzie Award nominations for Schwarzenegger: Worst Actor (as the real Adam), Worst Supporting Actor (as the clone of Adam) and Worst Screen Couple (Schwarzenegger as Adam and Schwarzenegger as the clone), but lost all three to Battlefield Earth. The film was also nominated four times at the 27th Saturn Awards, but lost to X-Men for Best Actor and Best Science Fiction Film, Hollow Man for Best Special Effects and How the Grinch Stole Christmas for Best Make-Up.

== See also ==
- List of American films of 2000
- Arnold Schwarzenegger filmography
