= Down the Shore =

Down the Shore may refer to:

- Down the Shore (TV series)
- Down the Shore (film)
