= David Petrarca =

American director and producer

- Born: November 10, 1965 (age 61); Warwick, Rhode Island, U.S.
- Occupations: Television director, Television producer, Theatre director, Film director, Producer, Writer
- Years active: 1985–present

David Petrarca (born November 10, 1965) is an American director and producer of theatre, television and film.

He was a director at the Goodman Theatre in Chicago from 1988 until 2005. His work as a director includes HBO's Boardwalk Empire, Game of Thrones, Big Love, Hung, and True Blood. Before for Apple TV, as well as Marco Polo, Jessica Jones and numerous other projects for Netflix. Other recent projects include The Alienist and Warrior. He worked as an executive producer on Death and Other Details, Those Who Kill, ABC series Eli Stone and Drop Dead Diva.

He was the recipient of a TCG/NEA Director Fellowship and has served as associate artistic director for the Cincinnati Playhouse in the Park and the Chelsea Theatre Centre in New York City, and on the NEA Theatre Panel.

He has taught at Maine Media Workshops, the University of North Carolina School of the Arts, the O'Neill Center and Northwestern University and has developed new work for New York Stage and Film and the Bread Loaf Writers' Conference.

In 1996, Petrarca was chosen by the Chicago Tribune as a "Chicagoan of the Year".

In 2006, he completed filming Save the Last Dance 2 for Paramount Pictures. As of mid-2017, he was working on the screenplay of Wendy MacLeod's Schoolgirl Figure, a film adaptation of David Lindsay-Abaire's Fuddy Meers, as well as a film about the legendary mime, Marcel Marceau.

== Selected works ==
=== As film director ===
- Save the Last Dance 2 (2006)

=== As television executive producer ===
- Death and Other Details (2024-)
- Those Who Kill (2014)
- Drop Dead Diva (2009)
- Eli Stone (2008–2009)
- Everwood (2004–2005)

=== As television director ===
- 68 Whiskey (episode #6: "Fight or Flight")
- The Alienist (episode #8: "Psychopathia Sexualis")
- Before 2 episodes
- Big Love (8 episodes)
- Boardwalk Empire (episode #14 "Ourselves Alone")
- Brothers & Sisters (episode #11: "Family Day")
- Cupid (episode #10: "Hung Jury")
- Dawson's Creek (7 episodes)
- Dirty Sexy Money (episode #6: "The Game")
- Doc (episode #22 "Inquisition")
- Drop Dead Diva (3 episodes)
- Early Edition (episode #61: "Number One with a Bullet")
- Eli Stone (7 episodes)
- Everwood (12 episodes)
- Felicity (episode #70: "The Last Thanksgiving")
- Full Circle (2 episodes)
- Game of Thrones (2 episodes)
- Gilmore Girls (episode #11: "Paris Is Burning")
- Glory Days (episode #7: "There Goes the Neighborhood")
- Gracepoint (2 episodes)
- Happy! (episode #6: "The Scrapyard of Childish Things")
- Hemlock Grove (episode #21: "Unicorn")
- Hung (2 episodes)
- Jack & Bobby (4 episodes)
- Jack & Jill (4 episodes)
- Jack Ryan (2 episodes)
- Jessica Jones (2 episodes)
- Joan of Arcadia (episode #6: "Bringeth It On")
- Knightfall (2 episodes)
- The Last of Us (TV series) (1 episode)
- Life on Mars (1 episode)
- Magic City (2 episodes)
- The Man In The High Castle (1 episode)
- Marco Polo (4 episodes)
- Memory of a Killer (2 episodes)
- Nashville (1 episode)
- No Ordinary Family (1 episode)
- Nothing Sacred (1 episode)
- On The Verge (3 episodes)
- Pan Am (1 episode)
- Pasadena (1 episode)
- Political Animals (2 episodes)
- The Politician (1 episode)
- Popular (1 episode)
- Powers (2 episodes)
- Six Degrees (2 episodes)
- State of Mind (1 episode)
- Studio 60 on the Sunset Strip (1 episode)
- Summerland (1 episode)
- The Expanse (2 episodes)
- Tom Clancy's Jack Ryan ( 2 episodes)
- To Have & to Hold (1 episode)
- Those Who Kill (3 episodes)
- True Blood (3 episodes)
- Tyrant (2 episodes)
- Warrior (4 episodes)
- Wayward Pines (1 episode)

=== As theatre director ===
- Away
- The Beard of Avon
- Current Events by David Marshall Grant ^{†}
- Dark Rapture
- Deep in a Dream of You ^{†}
- Design for Living
- Dinah Was ^{†}
- Down the Shore by Tom Donaghy ^{†}
- Fuddy Meers by David Lindsay-Abaire ^{†}
- The House of Martin Guerre ^{†}
- Juvenilia by Wendy MacLeod ^{†}
- Kimberly Akimbo by David Lindsay-Abaire ^{†}
- Light Up The Sky
- Lloyd's Prayer by Kevin Kling
- Lovers and Friends by Michael John LaChiusa ^{†}
- Marvin's Room (Directed the premiere in New York City as well as the West End of London)
- A Midsummer Night's Dream
- Mill Fire by Sally Nemeth ^{†}
- Northeast Local by Tom Donaghy ^{†}
- Nothing Sacred by George F. Walker
- Peacekeeper by Keith Reddin
- Red by Chay Yew ^{†}
- Richard II
- Sin by Wendy MacLeod ^{†}
- The Skin of Our Teeth
- Somebody Else's House by David Cale ^{†}
- Three Postcards by Craig Carnelia and Craig Lucas
- The Tooth of Crime by Sam Shepard
- The Visit
- The Water Children by Wendy MacLeod ^{†}
- Twelfth Night
- A Year with Frog and Toad on Broadway (Tony Award Nomination for Best Musical)

^{†} indicates a premiere.
