= Steve Bacic =

Canadian actor (b. 1965)

- Bacic in 2026
- Born: Lisičić, SR Croatia, Yugoslavia
- Occupation: Actor
- Years active: 1991–present

Steve Bacic (/ˈbeɪsɪk/ BAY-sik; Croatian: Bačić pronounced [ˈbatʃitɕ]) is a Canadian actor. He is known for playing the characters Gaheris and Telemachus Rhade on the Sci-Fi series Gene Roddenberry's Andromeda. After guest starring in seasons 1–3 as both characters, he joined the cast early in season 4 as Telemachus. In total, he was in 44 of the 110 Andromeda episodes. Beginning in 2013, he co-starred as Jason in the Hallmark Movies & Mysteries channel Garage Sale Mysteries series of TV films.

== Biography ==
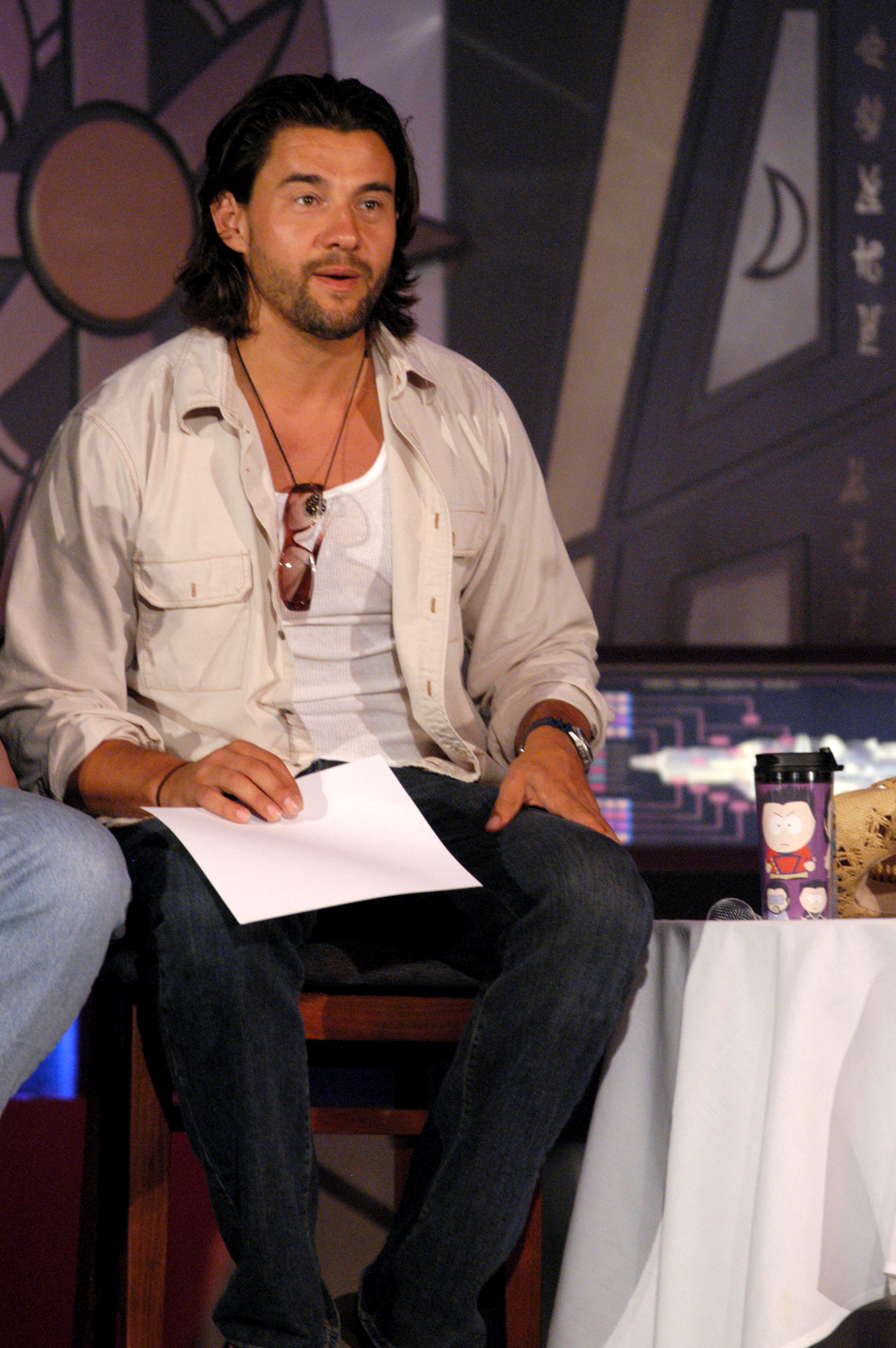
Bacic at Gatecon

Bacic was born in Lisičić, a village in Croatia, and raised in Windsor, Ontario, Canada.

In his mid-twenties, a road trip with friends led to settling into Vancouver, British Columbia, where, intrigued by all the television and film production going on there, he decided to stay and took acting classes. He read for a bit part in the 5th season of 21 Jump Street but instead landed the lead guest-starring role.

His television roles have included appearances on Street Justice, The Outer Limits, Highlander, Stargate SG-1, Smallville, ER, Republic of Doyle and The X-Files where he played a SWAT officer who douses himself with gasoline in a memorable episode. His film appearances include The 6th Day, Threshold, X2 and the Hallmark Channel film The Colt, and Deck the Halls, Safe Harbor and She Made Them Do It on Lifetime.

Bacic also played Prince Barin in the 2007 Flash Gordon TV series. His TV series The Guard premiered January 22, 2008 on Global Television Network in Canada. He plays Miro Da Silva, one of the four leads. The series is a drama series about the Canadian Coast Guard. He was cast as "Dark Archer" in the ninth season of Smallville in episode 10 called "Disciple". He played Goran on the HBO series Big Love, season 4. He also plays the character Trevor Wilson (formerly Bobby) in season one of Julie and the Phantoms.

== Filmography ==
=== Film ===
Year	Title	Role	Notes
1993	Another Stakeout	Frank	
1995	Deadly Sins	Eric	
1997	Bounty Hunters 2: Hardball	Carlos	Direct-to-video
2000	The 6th Day	Johnny Phoenix	
2001	L.A.P.D.: To Protect and to Serve	Richard Wade	Direct-to-video
2001	The Shipment	Jimmy	
2002	Ballistic: Ecks vs. Sever	FBI Agent Fleming	
2003	X2	Hank McCoy	Cameo
2003	Firefight	Jonas	
2006	John Tucker Must Die	Skip #1	
2007	Good Luck Chuck	Howard	
2007	Afghan Knights	Pepper	
2008	Odysseus and the Isle of the Mists	Eurylochus	
2008	Stargate: Continuum	Camulus	
2010	The Final Storm	Tom Grady	
2011	Tactical Force	Officer Blanco	
2013	A Haunting at Silver Falls	Kevin Sanders	
2013	5 Souls	Sam	Direct-to-video
2013	Suddenly	Dan Carney	
2015	Go with Me	Fitzgerald	
2017	Cold Zone	Dr. Tim Hughes	
2017	Killing Gunther	Max	
2017	Wonder	Mr. Albans	
2018	Lemonade	Moji	
2020	2 Hearts	Jose Bolivar	

=== Television ===
Year	Title	Role	Notes
1991	21 Jump Street	Tommy Boylan Jr.	Episode: "Wasted"
1991–1992	Street Justice	"Loco" Louis Parades	3 episodes
1993	Born to Run	Groom	Television film
1994	The Commish	Tito Muniz	Episode: "Father Eddie"
1994	M.A.N.T.I.S.	Aquino	Episode: "Tango Blue"
1995	The Marshal	Peter	Episode: "Little Odessa"
1995	She Stood Alone: The Tailhook Scandal	Boomer	Television film
1995–1996	The X-Files	Officer #2; Agent Collins	2 episodes
1996	In the Lake of the Woods	Lieutenant	Television film
1996	Viper	Dirk Minyard; Parker	2 episodes
1996	Highlander: The Series	Luke Sarsfield	Episode: "Little Tin God"
1996–1997	The Outer Limits	Roy; Griffin "Griff"	2 episodes
1996–1997	Profit	Seth	2 episodes
1997	Millennium	Deputy Kevin Reilly	Episode: "Covenant"
1998	The Sentinel	Joe Brock	Episode: "Finkelman's Folly"
1998	The X-Files	SWAT Commander	Episode: "Folie a Deux"
1998	Voyage of Terror	Alex Reid	Television film
1998	Da Vinci's Inquest	Police Constable #3	Episode: "Little Sister: Part 2"
1998	The Net	Cam Waverly	Episode: "Harvest"
1998	First Wave	Paul	Episode: "Undesirables"
1999	Night Man	Raul Marquez	Episode: "NightWoman Returns"
1999	Heaven's Fire	Rudy	Television film
1999	Honey, I Shrunk the Kids: The TV Show	Freddie	Episode: "Honey, Name That Tune"
1999	Cold Feet	Chipper Smith	Episode: "A Thong, a Potty and a Napoleon"
2000-	Earth: Final Conflict	Scott Pierce	Episode: "Through Your Eyes"
2000-2004	Stargate SG-1	Major Michael Patrick Coburn/ Camulus	12 episodes
2000	Quarantine	Joe Blake	Television film
2000	Call of the Wild	Oscar Deville	Episode: "Molly Brown"
2000–2001	Gene Roddenberry's Andromeda	Gaheris Rhade; Telemachus Rhade	5 episodes
2001	Beastmaster	Kim	Episode: "Tao's Brother"
2001	Dark Angel	Soldier 2	Episode: "Meow"
2001	Smallville	Garage Worker	Episode: "Pilot"
2001	Los Luchadores	Rodney the Ranger	2 episodes
2001	Night Visions	Handyman	Episode: "My So-Called Life and Death"
2001–2002	Just Deal	Coach	4 episodes
2002	The Associates	Mark	2 episodes
2002	Mysterious Ways	Ralph	Episode: "Something Fishy"
2002	Jeremiah	Gregory	Episode: "Ring of Truth"
2002	Beyond Belief: Fact or Fiction	Dirk Sidwell	Episode: "The Wealthy Widow, The Witness, The Accident, Bad Dreams & Mental"
2002	Body & Soul	Dr. Leslie Thomas	Episode: "Letting Go"
2002	Adventure Inc.	Stefan George	Episode: "Bride of the Sun"
2002	Just Cause	Al Sutherland	Episode: "Lama Hunt"
2003	Mutant X	Nick Maddox	Episode: "Within These Walls"
2003	The Twilight Zone	Ted Saicheck	Episode: "How Much Do You Love Your Kid?"
2003	Threshold	Frank Hansen	Television film
2003	Black Sash	Hector	Episode: "Jump Start"
2003	Out of Order	Phillip	6 episodes
2003	Encrypt	Lapierre	Television film
2003–2005	Gene Roddenberry's Andromeda	Gaheris Rhade; Telemachus Rhade	40 episodes
2004	Deception	Max	Television film
2004	Stargate SG-1	Camulus	2 episodes
2005	The Colt	Sgt. Longacre	Television film
2005	Deck the Halls	Nickolas St. Clair	Television film
2006	Masters of Horror	John Ralston	Episode: "Haeckel's Tale"
2006	Safe Harbor	Sam Wyatt	Television film
2006	Romeo!	Mitch Sullivan	Episode: "Tee'd Off"
2006	Blade: The Series	Frederick	2 episodes
2006	Whistler	Adam Lawson	3 episodes
2006	Psych	David Morrison Wilcroft	Episode: "Woman Seeking Dead Husband: Smokers Okay, No Pets"
2006	Three Moons Over Milford	Chet	Episode: "Goodnight Moon"
2006	All She Wants for Christmas	James Emerson	Television film
2007	ER	Derek Marshak	Episode: "Photographs and Memories"
2007	CSI: Miami	Rod Vickers	Episode: "Rush"
2007	Supernatural File	Pastor Joe Robles	Television film
2007	Flash Gordon	Prince Barin	4 episodes
2007	Blood Ties	Paul "Dirty" Deeds	Episode: "D.O.A."
2007	Battlestar Galactica: Razor	Colonel Jurgen Belzen	Television film
2008–2009	The Guard	Miro Da Silva	Lead role (22 episodes)
2009	Supernatural	Dr. Sexy	Episode: "Changing Channels"
2009	Cra$h & Burn	Pavel Korkov	9 episodes
2010	Smallville	Vordigan / Dark Archer	Episode: "Disciple"
2010	NCIS: Los Angeles	Ruman Marinov	Episode: "Burned"
2010–2011	Big Love	Goran	6 episodes
2011	Ghost Storm	Carl	Television film
2011	Endgame	Steven MacDonald/Abramyk	Episode: "The Other Side of Summer"
2011	The Listener	Luke Cassel	Episode: "Reckoning"
2011	To the Mat	Scottie Durkan	Television film
2012	Arctic Air	Rafael Silva	Episode: "All In"
2012	True Justice	Eli Cohen	Episode: "Vengeance is Mine"
2012	XIII: The Series	Andrej Kalishkanov	Episode: "Gauntlet"
2012	Flashpoint	Sergeant Robert Gray	Episode: "We Take Care of Our Own"
2012	The Selection	Mylan	Television film
2013	Cracked	Miller Branson	Episode: "How the Light Gets In"
2013	Nearlyweds	Mark	Television film
2013	She Made Them Do It	Sean	Television film
2013	Fatal Performance	Mark Thomas	Television film
2013	Profile for Murder	Sam	Television film
2013	Once Upon a Time in Wonderland	The Grendel	Episode: "Forget Me Not"
2013	Rita	Tom	Television film
2013–2014	Spooksville	George Freeman	7 episodes
2013–2014	Republic of Doyle	Inspector Craig Smallwood	6 episodes
2014	When Calls the Heart	Charles Spurlock	4 episodes
2014	My Gal Sunday	Claudus Jovanet	Television film
2014	The 100	Caliban	Episode: "The Calm"
2014	The Haunting Hour: The Series	Dad	Episode: "Return of the Pumpkinheads"
2014–2019	Garage Sale Mystery	Jason Shannon	15 episodes
2015	The Whispers	Reid	Episode: "Meltdown"
2015	Sugar Babies	Leo Granger	Television film
2015	Stolen Daughter	Jack Tripping	Television film
2015	The Bridge	Wade Callens	Television film
2016	Get Out Alive	James Raymond	Television film
2016	Second Chance	Bennet	3 episodes
2016	The Bridge Part 2	Wade Callens	Television film
2016	Aftermath	Jeff Cottrell	2 episodes
2016	A Christmas to Remember	Brad	Television film
2017	Deadly Sorority	Professor Justin Miller	Television film
2017	Ring of Deception	Martin Hale	Television film
2017	All for Love	Colin Kelly	Television film
2017	Hit the Road	Werner Skelter	Episode: "Gone, Daddy, Gone"
2017	A Joyous Christmas	Stuart Ryan	Television film
2017–2018	Arrow	Sean Sonus	2 episodes
2018	Taken	Augustin Vikhrov	Episode: "Render"
2018	Once Upon a Christmas Miracle	Jack	Television film
2019	Ransom	Alexei Smirnov	Episode: "Prima"
2020	Mystery 101	Mac McKinnon	Episode: "An Education in Murder"
2020	Motherland: Fort Salem	General Voronin	Episode: "A Biddy's Life"
2020	The Order	Malachai	2 episodes
2020	Julie and the Phantoms	Trevor Wilson	2 episodes
2020	Supernatural	Pastor Joe	Episode: "Gimme Shelter"
2020	Christmas with the Darlings	Charles Darlington	Television film
2020–present	Virgin River	Wesley Logan, Vince Logan (identical twins)	5 episodes
2021	Two Sentence Horror Stories	Sheriff Stone	Episode: "Manifest Destiny"
2021	Debris	Beck	1 episode
2021	Nancy Drew	Daniel West	1 episode
2021	Van Helsing	Emmett's Dad	1 episode
2021	DC's Legends of Tomorrow	Doc	1 episode
2021	Maid	Micah	2 episodes
2022	Love, Classified	Brian	Television film
2022	Time for Him to Come Home for Christmas	Carter	Television film
2023	Aurora Teagarden Mysteries: Something New	Detective Cook	Television film
2023	Fourth Down and Love	Richard	Television film
2023	Wilderness	Elliot	2 episodes
2025	Sight Unseen	Damien Sumner	1 episode

== Awards ==
Year	Group	Award	Work	Result	Refs
2008	Leo Awards	Best Lead Performance by a Male in a Dramatic Series	The Guard	Nominated	
2009	Leo Awards	Best Lead Performance by a Male in a Dramatic Series	The Guard	Nominated	
