= List of Catfish: The TV Show episodes =

Catfish: The TV Show is an American television series that began airing on MTV on November 12, 2012. The second season began airing on June 25, 2013. Season 3 and Season 4 premiered respectively on May 7, 2014, and February 25, 2015. Season 5 began airing on February 24, 2016. Season 8 premiered on January 8, 2020. The second part of the eighth season premiered on August 5, 2020, and featured the first episodes of the series where the hosts only interacted online instead of in person because of the COVID-19 pandemic.

== Series overview ==
Season	Episodes	Originally released	
Season	Episodes	First released	Last released
1	12	November 12, 2012	February 25, 2013
2	16	June 25, 2013	October 15, 2013
3	10	May 7, 2014	July 9, 2014
4	19	February 25, 2015	August 30, 2015
5	20	February 24, 2016	September 21, 2016
6	20	March 1, 2017	August 30, 2017
7	40	January 3, 2018	August 29, 2019
8	99	January 8, 2020	May 14, 2024
9	11	April 30, 2024	July 16, 2024

== Episodes ==
=== Season 1 (2012–2013) ===
No. overall	No. in season	Title	Original release date	U.S. viewers (millions)
1	1	"Sunny & Jamison"	November 12, 2012	2.68
Nursing student Sunny met and fell in love with model "Jamison" or "RJ" while chatting on Facebook, but they hadn't met after eight months of talking. "Jamison" was using the real photos of model RJ King on his profile. When Nev finally introduces Sunny to "Jamison", he turns out to be a girl named Chelsea who originally created the profile for revenge on a former friend. Chelsea shows no remorse and says that she has no feelings for Sunny. Later they talk and Chelsea admits that she is bisexual and has feelings for Sunny. They decide to be real friends. Chelsea eventually admits remorse for creating the fake profile and reveals that she used to be bullied. She decides to delete the fake profile and start helping other bullied kids. At the end of the episode, Nev and Max introduce Sunny to the real RJ King on a Skype call.
2	2	"Trina & Scorpio"	November 19, 2012	2.74
Exotic dancer Shawnise aka Trina the Natural, met fellow exotic dancer Lee aka "Scorpio" on MySpace and hasn't met him in person after over a year of talking. Nev does some online investigating and find that the pictures of "Scorpio" belong to Atlanta model Larry Drummer. When Nev introduces Shawnise to Lee, he tells her the truth: he's 32 instead of 27 and has 4 children instead of 2. Nev introduces Shawnise to the real Larry "Scorpio" Drummer in the end. Lee says he's happy to be friends with Trina but still hopes that romance will blossom between them someday. Trina has quit dancing and is pursuing other career opportunities.
3	3	"Kim & Matt"	November 26, 2012	2.61
Kim had been talking to Matt for over 10 years when she contacted Nev for help to meet him. She is in a relationship with a man named Scott, who knows about Matt. Kim opens up to Nev that the love of her life Steven committed suicide and that Matt helped her through the grief. She meets Matt at his home, where he reveals he has refused to meet her because he is ashamed of his weight. In the epilogue, Matt continues to diet and exercise every day, and since filming ended, he has lost another 20 pounds. Kim went home and broke up with Scott, and she and Matt remain best friends. Kim is finally taking the time to deal with the loss of Steven, but she's not yet ready to think about starting a new romance.
4	4	"Jasmine & Mike"	December 3, 2012	2.23
Jasmine had been texting "Mike" for two years, though they had never met or talked on the phone. Mike turns out to be a girl named Mhissy whom Jasmine knew in real life. Mhissy and Jasmine used to be friends until they had a fight when they found out they were seeing the same guy. Mhissy said she created the fake profile to get revenge on Jasmine for not leaving Mhissy's boyfriend Josh aka Triggs alone after they hooked up. In the epilogue, Jasmine has put her interest on finding romance on hold since filming ended, instead focusing on school and spending time with her son. Mhissy has made the decision to adopt her niece and become her legal guardian and says she has no plans to create fake profiles.Jasmine and Mhissy have had no contact since they appeared in this episode.
5	5	"Jarrod & Abby"	December 10, 2012	2.41
Jarrod is a divorced father from Georgia who fell for a blonde girl on Facebook, "Abby". Jarrod told Nev that he had even proposed to Abby and she said yes. She also promised to move in with him but never did. When Nev finally introduces them after a year and a half of talking, "Abby" turns out to be an obese girl named Melissa whose low self-esteeem led her to create the fake profile. In the epilogue, Jarrod has put his romantic pursuits on hold and is focusing on music since filming ended. He and Melissa continued to talk to each other every day. Melissa had deactivated her Abby profile and also lost 15 pounds. She is glad Jarrod has kept her in his life and hopes that love could still blossom between them.
6	6	"Kya & Alyx"	December 17, 2012	2.07
When Kya first met Alyx online, she used a fake name and fake pictures. She later told him the truth and Alyx forgave her. Nev helps Kya finally meet Alyx, who she says she has fallen in love with but has never actually met. When they meet, Alyx turns out to be a transgender man. They decide to stay a couple after Kya learns the truth. In the epilogue, Alyx is continuing hormone replacement therapy and saving up for gender-reassignment surgery.
7	7	"Joe & Kari Ann"	January 7, 2013	2.52
Nev helps Joe meet the girl he's been talking to who says she is former Miss United States Teen 2003 Kari Ann. Kari Ann agrees to meet Joe at his farm...and turns out to be Rose, a former high-school classmate who has always had feelings for him. She apologizes but admits that she had "mastered" being a catfish after having been one for years, In the end, Rose moves to California to live with the boyfriend she met through the fake "Kari Ann" profile; he was surprised when he found out the truth but accepted her anyway. Joe and Rose haven't talked since filming ended.
8	8	"Tyler & Amanda"	January 14, 2013	2.17
Tyler has fallen for Amanda when he asks Nev for help. When Tyler tells his friends about her, they are all surprised that it was an online woman. When he goes to Amanda's house, "Amanda" is revealed to be Aaron, a teenage boy struggling with his sexuality. In the epilogue, Tyler now attends Western Michigan University in Kalamazoo. Aaron recently moved to New York City, and he said that he's staying offline for now and actually starting to go out on dates.
9	9	"Rod & Ebony"	January 21, 2013	2.75
In the 4 years they've been talking, Rod hasn't been honest with Ebony about what he looks like or his name, which he told her is "KJ". Ebony is transgender and said she couldn't meet up in the beginning because she had cancer. Rod wants to tell her the truth but is afraid that Ebony might be lying to him too. Ebony turns out to be a cisgender woman who has been a lesbian for 15 years and has a child; she lied about being transgender. In the epilogue, Rod and Ebony are still friends, but they communicate only a few times a week now. Rod says he's not ready to meet people online right now and needs time to think about what he wants. Ebony is staying offline as well and has instead been enjoying the Atlanta nightlife and found romance with a woman.
10	10	"Rico & Ja'mari"	January 28, 2013	2.27
Rico lives in the U.S. but is torn: should he consider his online relationship with a man named Ja'mari or move to England to be with his ailing mother? When Rico meets Ja'mari, he finds out that the pictures he saw were real, but Ja'mari's real name is James and he's a bus drover instead of a model like he told Rico. Nev and Rico do more research and find that James has a criminal record, but when they ask him about it, he explains that it was a case of mistaken identity that took him over 2 years to clear his name successfully. on whether or not to continue his online relationship with a man named Ja'mari or move to England to be with his ailing mother. When Rico meets Ja'mari, he finds out that the pictures he saw were real but also discovers that Ja'mari's real name is James and that he is a bus driver instead of a model like he told Rico. Nev and Rico do more research and discover that James has a criminal record, and James explains that it was a mistaken-identity case and it took 2 years to clear his name successfully. In the epilogue, Rico's mother's health has improved since filming ended and he has decided to stay in the U.S. to continue his relationship with James. They haven't seen each other in the past month but plan to get together soon.
11	11	"Mike & Felicia"	February 18, 2013	2.37
Mike and Felicia met online and soon hit it off. After agreeing to meet, Felicia stood Mike up, offering only thin excuses. Nev and Max do some research and find that she supposedly lives in Jersey City, though she claims that she opened a store in Orlando. They contact her friend and learn that she has previously lied to people on the Internet. When Mike meets Felicia he finds that the pictures were real, but she lied about the store in Orlando, but still lives there. Mike is hurt that she lied but agrees to meet with her to talk about their future. Two months later, Mike is still living with his parents and has found a job installing irrigation systems and hopes to move to his own place soon. Felicia continues to live in Orlando and go to school. Grateful that Mike had given her a second chance, she says she's being 100% truthful with him and doing her best to be honest with everyone else in her life as well. She also says she's planning to move back to New Jersey in six months, because when she went to visit Mike, they officially became a couple. Felicia later said on Twitter that Mike stood her up by not meeting her at the airport, and their relationship ended.
12	12	"Stephanie & David"	February 22, 2013	N/A
-	-	"The Reunion Show"	February 25, 2013	1.95
Participants from Catfish: The TV Show reunite in MTV's Times Square studio to answer questions from fans. The show is hosted by Nev and Max, and SuChin Pak. Sunny and Chelsea have not remained in contact. Trina and Lee remain good friends, as do Kim and Matt, and Jarrod and Melissa (who appear via webcam unlike all other participants). Joe remains bitter about Rose's online relationship with him as Kari Ann and they do not talk. Jasmine and Mhissy break out into an argument over an insulting Facebook post from Jasmine to Mhissy.

=== Season 2 (2013) ===
No. overall	No. in season	Title	Original release date	U.S. viewers (millions)
13	1	"Cassie & Steve"	June 25, 2013	1.75
Cassie's life was on a downward spiral of alcohol, drug abuse, and promiscuity after her father's brutal murder. Then one day she received a Facebook message from Steve and he became the positive influence she needed, teaching her to love herself and improve her lifestyle. Their relationship intensified and Cassie even asked Steve to marry her—and Steve accepted. Cassie desperately wants to meet her fiancé, but Steve is always too busy to video chat, let alone get together with her. They find out that Steve is actually Cassie's best friend Gladys, and Gladys' cousin, who wanted to help get Cassie's life back on track after all other efforts failed. In the epilogue, Cassie has put her dating life on hold and is currently devoting most her time working at the radio station and keeping up with her studies for school. Gladys deactivated Steve's profile and has not started any others, and she is hopeful that she and Cassie will grow close again.
14	2	"Anthony and Marq"	July 2, 2013	2.15
Anthony is a decorated Iraq War veteran who wears his Purple Heart on his sleeve. Over a year ago, he bonded online with caring, emotionally-available Marq. Today, they're head over heels in love—yet Anthony has already caught Marq in troubling lies. It turned out that Marq is really a man named Framel. In the epilogue, Anthony has put his romantic life on hold while he recovers from losing Marq. Anthony has not spoken to Framel since filming ended.
15	3	"Ramon & Paola"	July 9, 2013	2.12
Ramon spends most of his time in a dead-end job in a town that he's struggling to escape. His one glimmer of happiness is Paola, a girl he met on Facebook; they have established an exclusive online relationship. After many failed attempts to video-chat, Paola finally relented and connected with Ramon briefly, but he saw a completely-different-looking girl on his video screen before she hung up, and he's been baffled ever since. When Ramon and "Paola" finally meet, it's revealed that she tried to come clean multiple times, but he refused to accept the truth. Nev looks at the real Paola's Facebook and finds that she used some of the money Ramon sent her to buy herself an engagement ring. She says she feels guilty and is slowly repaying Ramon.
16	4	"Lauren & Derek"	July 16, 2013	1.91
Lauren met Derek on MySpace nearly eight years ago. Since then she's relied on him for everything—Derek's funny and fresh, and he even supported Lauren after she had a baby with a now-former boyfriend. Lauren knows that Derek is the man of her dreams and she can't wait to take the next step with him. The only problem is, they've never met in real life or even video-chatted. Every time she's tried to see Derek he's always had an excuse. Lauren strongly believes that Derek could be her future husband and she feels that he can be a good father to her three-year-old son. In the end, this became the first case in which the "Catfish" turned out to be fully genuine and did not lie. An aftershow, filmed in front of an audience and featuring host SuChin Pak, was broadcast following the episode to celebrate this.
17	5	"Dorion & Jeszica"	July 23, 2013	2.19
Dorion is torn between two women—his current girlfriend Raffinee and his online love of over two years, Jeszica. Dorion was introduced to Jeszica on Facebook while she was dating one of his friends. They quickly started texting and talking on the phone, and now he's completely fallen for her. Dorion has even shared his darkest secrets with Jeszica. He says that he trusts her completely, but every time he's tried to meet her, she ends up blowing him off. Dorion is willing to give up everything for Jeszica, including his relationship with Raffinee. Jeszica turned out to be a fake profile made by a girl named Alexis. Alexis believes she is in love with Dorion. After they meet, and she finds out about Raffinee, Dorion decides to prioritize his relationship with Raffinee, and to not maintain contact with Alexis. Alexis accepts this and deleted the fake profile.
18	6	"Jen & Skylar"	July 30, 2013	2.06
Having dealt with a number of bullies in her past, teenager Jen relies on online communities to establish relationships. Jen has many friends around the world, but Skylar is by far the most special one to her. After meeting on a gaming site, in a flash, Jen and Skylar went from innocent online bantering to constant flirtatious texting. Now, Jen is ready to take things to the next level, but she's never met Skylar in person and has only two pictures of him. Jen is scared to push the reticent Skylar too hard, but she's desperate to know if he could really be her first true love. When they go to meet Skylar, he turns out to be somebody named Bryan who had no feelings towards Jen and also did not feel his actions were cruel. He says was trying to "give her a gift". Later, he reveals that he was hurt in a previous relationship and turned to the Internet to cope with his pain. Nev and Max instruct him not to contact Jen again.
19	7	"Mike & Kristen"	August 6, 2013	1.77
Three and a half years ago, Mike met his ultimate mystery girl, Kristen, on Facebook. They quickly forged a deep connection, exchanging "I love yous" and carrying on a turbulent on-again/off-again relationship. But although they live only 40 miles apart, Mike's frequent efforts to meet Kristen have been futile. Mike believes that she's afraid of rejection due to a permanent injury from a car accident, but he's convinced that she's real and they could live "happily ever after" together if they could only meet. Kristen turns out to be not the girl in the photos, although the rest of her story is real, including that she lost an eye in a car accident. While he is angry at first, Mike accepts her apology, and they stay in contact but only as acquaintances.
-	-	"Midseason Reunion"	August 13, 2013	0.97
20	8	"Jesse & Brian"	August 20, 2013	1.82
When Jesse was introduced to Brian on Facebook, she thought she'd hit the jackpot. Brian is a former Marine, a true gentleman, and handsome! They made plans to meet and Jesse drove hundreds of miles to see him, but Brian never showed up and stopped answering her calls. The next day, Jesse begged Brian to explain why he stood her up, but he refused. Now, three years later, Brian has asked her to move halfway across the country to live with him. Jesse feels that Brian could be the perfect guy for her and she's ready for a fresh start. Note: Brian died in a motorcycle accident near Birmingham, Alabama, on December 7, 2016.
21	9	"Artis & Jess"	August 27, 2013	2.10
Artis' life changed five months ago when he met sexy blonde beauty Jess on Facebook. Although Artis and Jess were in other relationships, still living with their significant others, they still believed they had found the true love they so desperately wanted. Even though Artis has seen only one photo of Jess, he's willing to risk everything to be with her and is ready to meet Jess in person. Jess turns out to be a strange man called Justin. In the epilogue, Justin and Artis have had no communication since filming ended. Artis explained everything that happened with Justin to the mother of his children. His willingness for being honest and to be open with her has greatly improved their relationship. Justin refused to comment to the producers.
22	10	"Ashley & Mike"	September 3, 2013	1.74
For over seven years, Ashley has sent dramatically altered photos of herself to her soul mate, Mike, to make her look thinner and more attractive to him. Mike, who appears to be an extraordinarily fit and handsome young man, lives several states away in New Jersey. Saddled by insecurities around her weight and a fear of going out in public, Ashley has become more reliant on her online connection to Mike with each passing year, but has always found an excuse not to meet up with him. Mike has always been there for Ashley, consoling her through the period after her father's sudden death and becoming an intensely positive force in her life. Now Ashley feels ready to come out of hiding to show her true self to Mike. Nev and Max discover that Mike may not be the person in the photos, and when they go to meet him, he turns out to be overweight. However, unlike Ashley's pictures, Mike's are of a completely different person. By the end of the episode, they are shown to remain in contact and on good terms. Note: Mike died of a pulmonary embolism in Hartford, Connecticut, on October 12, 2013, Ashley of a suspected drug overdose in Hoover, Alabama, on April 30, 2016.
23	11	"Aaliyah & Alicia"	September 10, 2013	1.61
Times have been tough for Aaliyah, a resident of Oakland, California. Recently, her family was evicted from their home and she's been couch-surfing at different friends' houses while she completes her education. Throughout this difficult period, Aaliyah has found comfort in her relationship with Alicia, a young woman she met online. Alicia is Aaliyah's first real girlfriend; they text each other all day long and talk on the phone until late into the night, often falling asleep on the phone together. However, Alicia lives just 70 blocks from Aaliyah and is refusing to meet her in the flesh. Alicia claims that she's not yet ready to come out to her friends and family, and therefore unwilling to take things further. When they meet, Alicia is cold and mocking. She says she has no romantic feelings for Alicia and that she only pursued the online relationship because Aaliyah gave her money and gifts. She later admits she does think of Aaliyah as a friend, and that she realizes she needs to re-evaluate how she relates to people. In the epilogue, we learn that Alicia has contacted Aaliyah, but Aaliyah has decided not to respond.
24	12	"Nick & Melissa"	September 24, 2013	1.21
Nick and Melissa met in a Tila Tequila fan chat room when they were 12 years old, and they have been talking for six years. There's only one problem: Melissa now lives with her boyfriend Olin but tells Nick she would ideally be with him. Melissa turns out to be broadly telling the truth. She is living with her ex-boyfriend Olin and his mother. Her photos are all similarly posed to disguise her weight. Melissa fluctuates between wanting Olin, wanting Nick, wanting both of them, and wanting neither. She and Nick meet, and they get along fine, but she stays with Olin.
25	13	"Derek & Kristen"	October 1, 2013	0.95
Derek is a veteran and a single father who was cheated on by his ex-wife. He is in an online relationship with Kristen, who is quickly revealed to be lying about her appearance, as she uses photos of three different women on her profile, which Derek had not noticed. When they meet, she is revealed to be called Chasity, and is none of the women in the photos. She explains that she started the profile to keep tabs on whether her children's father is doing anything illegal or suspicious.
26	14	"Keyonnah & Bow Wow"	October 8, 2013	1.08
Keyonnah has been a fan of the rapper Bow Wow since she was growing up. She messages him one day and is shocked when he messages her back. They have been talking for four months, but Keyonnah is suspicious when he refuses to video-chat. 'Bow Wow' had even sent Keyonnah $10,000 to aid her financial troubles. Bow Wow is revealed to be a female called Dee, who says she uses the profile to meet girls and become romantically involved with them, although some of them don't realize that she's a woman. Keyonnah had been speaking on the phone with Dee's cousin Fred, whom she also meets in the episode.
-	-	"Catfish Season 2: Last Hooks"	October 13, 2013	0.81
27	15	"Mike & Caroline"	October 15, 2013	1.28
Mike, a struggling artist from Pensacola, Florida, fell in love online with a beautiful redhead named Caroline over a year and a half ago. But as their connection grew, so did Mike's suspicions, since they live in the same city and Caroline has continually evaded his attempts to meet. Strangely, Caroline often makes her presence known by sending Mike pictures of the exterior of his workplace and has even left a note on his car when it was parked in front of his house. Regardless, Mike continues to grow more invested in his relationship with Caroline, especially when he learned that she was diagnosed with colon cancer and needs his support. Mike can't tear himself away from this intensely bizarre love affair, but does wonder if he's being preyed upon by a stalking catfish. When they finally meet, Caroline turns out to be a woman named Heather, who lied about having cancer and had an online relationship with Mike prior to filming with a different fake account created to help her best friend see if her partner was cheating on her.
28	16	"Catfish: The Reunion Show 2"	October 15, 2013	1.25

=== Season 3 (2014) ===
No. overall	No. in season	Title	Original release date	U.S. viewers (millions)
29	1	"Craig & Zoe"	May 7, 2014	2.02
Craig, a 24-year-old man from Pittsburgh, Pennsylvania, has been in a tumultuous relationship with a girl named Zoe from Shelby, North Carolina who is apparently a friend of his sister Mariah. He states that Zoe has given him all the love he should have but never received, and has also rendered him financial assistance. However, when asked by Craig to send him a new picture of herself, she turned irritable. She has complete access to Craig's social-media accounts, and on several occasions, has misused them along with her own by uploading raunchy pictures of mutual friends of Craig and Mariah, owing to the dissolution of relationships and friendships. On tracing her number, it is shown to correspond with a Mary Ann Razmus from Shelby, North Carolina and the catfish is discovered to be her daughter Cassandra, who once sent her picture to Craig under the impersonation of Zoe. When confronted, she is initially impassive, but later breaks down and admits to being bullied and creating Zoe's profile just to "put people on blast". Craig has since severed all contact with Cassandra who has been rebuilding her life.
30	2	"Antwane & Tony"	May 14, 2014	1.55
Carmen contacted Nev and Max to aid her cousin Antwane from Cincinnati, Ohio, who has been pursuing a relationship via chat-line with a man named Tony for three years without knowledge of his surname, his location, or his appearance. Apparently, Tony is a construction worker from Atlanta, Georgia, whose hectic schedule forbids him to meet with Antwane. Tony's number is then traced to a Diana Thomas in whose family is an Anthony Thomas who was serving time in prison. After hitting three possible local addresses listed under Diana Thomas' name, Carmen reveals in an anticlimax that she is Tony. She illumines the fact that she is a habitual catfish and takes pride in it, and that she has made reprisals with Antwane over a public jest he made about her three years ago. In the end, it is seen that Carmen has quit her practice of catfishing and has reached out to Antwane, but to no avail.
31	3	"Antoinette & Albert"	May 21, 2014	1.70
Antoinette of Dallas, Texas, an avidly followed member of Instagram initiated contact with rapper, T-Lights of the band The Twentys from Boca Raton, Florida. T-Lights always cooks up excuses when asked to video chat. The phone number that he uses to contact Antoinette is discovered to be registered to a Carmen Essaye, mother to sons Joseph and Albert (T-Lights). The catfish is initially assumed to be Joseph, who is married and assists his brother in the handling of his Instagram account, as the manager of The Twentys dismissed the number as not having belonged to Albert. Nev and Max accompany Antoinette to a show of the band where they catch up backstage where the authenticity of the relationship between Albert and Antoinette is established. But due to the brewing concerns over jobs and attachment, they decided to not pursue a romantic relationship but kept their friendship intact. Antoinette has since been dating someone else.
32	4	"Lucille & Kidd Cole"	May 28, 2014	1.38
Lucille became affiliated with apparent recording artist Kidd Cole (who claims to have ties with Kanye West and his record label) and his co-manager Miguel who implicate her in a series of events that involve fat payments to the parties concerned. On the pretext of a financial lockdown, the financing is shouldered by Lucille and Miguel went off the radar. It is discovered that Kidd Cole's music on SoundCloud is not original material, and when they meet with Loretta, another victim of his scams, it is revealed that he has had a criminal record for felony and fraud. Nev, Max and Lucille meet up with Kidd Cole who is evidently lying, and in the heat of the moment, Nev tosses Kidd's cell phone into the water. The following day, they arrange to meet in a recording studio where Kidd's friend claims to be a sound engineer, but the truth is unveiled when he confesses to the producer that he was just playing the part. Two months later, it is seen that Lucille is pursuing criminal justice in college while Kidd Cole refused the follow-up interview and has not turned a new leaf since.
33	5	"Tracie & Sammie"	June 4, 2014	1.56
Tracie Thoms is an actress from Los Angeles, California who has encountered a super-crazy fan called Samantha on Twitter who creates fake profiles to garner more attention. She also initiated contact with a couple of other stars named Lotti and Marissa, using her bogus accounts under the name of Reese, a cancer patient. Sammie informs Tracie and the others of Reese's apparent death which leaves them in dismay. It is later discovered that Reese's funeral footage was that of Sammie's cousin. When they meet with Marissa, she shows Nev and Max fan mail and a poetry by Sammie with romantic undertones. It is then discovered that Sammie is a bisexual woman with a child. When Tracie meets with Sammie, she admits without any issue. In the follow-up, Tracie says that she would like to read Sammie's books in the event of them being published. Sammie has since quit stalking celebrities and is focusing on living her life with her son.
34	6	"John & Kelsey"	June 11, 2014	1.26
John met Kelsey Beelzebub, whose voice he has heard only once and whom he has never video chatted with, in a psychology chat room. Kelsey claims to have body dysmorphic disorder and anxiety. It is eventually known that a girl and a guy, Ellie and Adam, from the same chat room are in a parallel relationship with Ellie never having seen Adam. John admits that he was, at some point, interested in Ellie. Kelsey agrees to meet John at a local café, but he sends them to a fake address and admits to being in a casino. Kelsey is revealed to be Adam who uncouthly reveals that he takes pride in catfishing and has done it to roughly 30-40 people. He created Kelsey's account with the intent of keeping John out of Ellie's way. The next day, Nev, Max, and John meet with Adam, who is more apologetic and confesses to Ellie via Skype. Two months later, Adam has reconstructed his life after moving to Los Angeles to pursue a career in writing and has deactivated Kelsey's profile. He has also renewed his relationship with Ellie. Meanwhile, John has taken the time to visit a female friend in Illinois and is on amicable terms with Adam.
35	7	"Solana & Elijah"	June 18, 2014	1.13
Solana has been in a five-year relationship with Elijah, whom she met on MySpace, since she was 14. Elijah was her rock when she was coming to terms with her parents' divorce, but he abruptly goes off the radar. Around a couple of years later, he reaches out to her via a Facebook message, when Solana is in a relationship with Danny, but says that his gadget does not facilitate phone calls or video chat,so her must resort to a texting app. Elijah's number is traced to a 33-year-old Denise. On conducting a Facebook search, myriad Facebook profiles pop up with Elijah's name, pictures or both. Eventually, it is learned that he has a YouTube channel on which he uploads self-filmed footage of himself. On arriving at Elijah's residence, a man named Joshua answers the door and invites Nev, Max, and Solana inside to meet Elijah who appears after a few moments. Solana is at a paradox and eventually settles for a friendship with Elijah after she marries Danny. Elijah continues to remain in contact and respects her decision.
36	8	"Miranda & Cameryn"	June 25, 2014	1.59
Miranda met has been in a relationship with Cameryn for three years. Cameryn cooks up several excuses when meeting in person or video-calling is suggested. Miranda eventually learned that Cameryn's supposed actual name was James when she came across pictures of him tagged as someone named Josh. His phone number traces to a woman named Hang, who has a son named James (who has no affiliation with the story whatsoever). When called, James is tentative but ultimately agrees to meet up with Miranda. Nev, Max and Miranda fly to Marietta, Georgia to be told by James that family pressure obstructed him from seeing Miranda and proposes a Skype call through which James/Cameryn is revealed to be Gabby, an 18-year-old girl who is confounded about her sexuality. They set up a meeting the next day. Gabby bails, leaving Miranda stricken. Over time, Gabby felt remorse and wished to make it up to her and she revealed that she reconnected with her. Miranda stated that she has forgiven Gabby, but reveals that her talks with her have a flirtatious undertone.
37	9	"Jeff & Megan"	July 2, 2014	1.18
Jeff is a Navy sailor who encountered Megan from Florida who claims to be a registered nurse. Their friendship was born out of an accidental friend request on Facebook. The pair have neither met nor video-chatted. Jeff disclosed that he once traveled to Texas to meet Megan, but was stood up. On running Megan's phone number, it returns a hit- brandy from Texas. On inspection of Brandy's Facebook profile, Nev and Max note that it coincides everywhere with Megan's profile. Owing to his job, Jeff is unable to head to Texas which sends Max flying solo. After stalking Brandy at her apartment, he finally manages to convince her to accompany him. On meeting with Jeff, Megan reveals to him that she works at a dispatch company and created the Megan profile to escape her memories of an abusive past relationship. Although Jeff is disappointed initially, he is empathetic. A month later, Jeff is still in contact with Brandy but has reenlisted in the Navy. Brandy says that they speak daily and she is looking forward to the future and attending counseling.
-	-	"Blake & Kiersten (aka Blake & Kendra)"	July 8, 2014	1.32
The stars of love were hardly ever aligned for Blake until he met Kiersten on Twitter who is apparently a model who works for a professional sports company and who claims to be David Hasselhoff's goddaughter. Blake made numerous futile attempts to meet Kiersten in person. A revelation is made when Kiersten tells Blake that her given name is actually Kendra and she has a son. Kendra's pictures are discovered to be those of a Sara Grace who tearfully tells Nev and Max that Kendra had been using her pictures to manipulate men while employing the picture of a Sarah Ordo on her Facebook profile. When Kendra is met with, she turns out to be an obese woman who is emotionally unstable and tetchy with Max. She persists in her lies, but gradually confesses in part. A month later, we see that Blake has been on a few dates, but is still single and has disconnected from Kendra. Meanwhile, Kendra is uninterested in pursuing a friendship with Blake, but is glad that she came clean.
38	10	"Bianca & Brogan"	July 9, 2014	1.07
Bianca, a lesbian, met Brogan via Facebook. The pair had never video-chatted, but when the subject was broached, Brogan vanished out of the blue and deleted her Facebook account. A year later, she reactivated and reconnected with Bianca. Brogan Acaster is then traced to a blog with shots of a pregnant woman with the same tattoos that Bianca had seen through pictures. Brogan is eventually revealed to be Tia, who confessed to creating the profile with no motive, but eventually getting immersed in it. She discloses that she was sexually assaulted at 14. In the follow-up, Bianca wasn't ready to let Tia into her life meaningfully, while Tia is repentant and hopes for a reconciliation. Special Guest Star: Selita Ebanks

=== Season 4 (2015) ===
Note: Max Joseph is absent for episodes 1-5 and 17-18 due to his work on his film, We Are Your Friends.

No. overall	No. in season	Title	Original release date	U.S. viewers (millions)
39	1	"Miracle & Javonni"	February 25, 2015	1.41
At the beginning of the episode, Max reveals that he won't be joining Nev right away this season as he is working on a film with Zac Efron called We Are Your Friends; Charlamagne tha God fills in for him as 26-year-old Miracle from Milwaukee, Wisconsin contacts Nev to help her connect with Javonni, whom she believes to be the love of her life. Javonni claimed to be a music producer. When Nev and Charlamagne take Miracle to meet Javonni, he is revealed to be Kara. Kara created the Javonni profile to help out a friend who thought her boyfriend was cheating on her. Kara continued to talk to Miracle because she was lonely and bored after complications with lupus kept her homebound. Miracle and Kara agree to be friends. In the epilogue, Kara has not replied to Miracle's Facebook messages, but says she plans to do so. Special Guest Star: Charlamagne tha God
40	2	"Courtney & Issak"	March 4, 2015	0.96
Nev enlists the help of Cassidy Wolf to help Courtney find out the true identity of a catfish who wrote into the show pretending to be her. She met him on a dating website. The two were supposed to meet, but she called off the meeting and ended all contact after she realized he had been using a fake picture. At the meetup, he is revealed to be an asexual man who was uncomfortable sharing information on the internet which is why he used a fake picture. The two come to an agreement that they will never have contact again in the future. In the epilogue, he has had no contact with her and has had some luck dating as himself. The "hopeful" has chosen to focus on her family and stick to traditional dating. Special Guest Star: Cassidy Wolf
41	3	"Harold & Armani"	March 11, 2015	1.03
Nev is joined by Angel Haze to help Harold meet Armani. Harold has seen only one picture of Armani over a span of four years and he reveals that Armani has mothered a child after being impregnated by a jailbird. A web search for Armani's e-mail username pops up a basketball recruitment page with a girl named Tamila on it. When met with, Tamila is uncovered as the catfish who, hand-in-glove with her friend, monitor the Armani page while corroborating the facts to unsuspecting males. Tamila is light-hearted about the situation, but reveals the next day that she is insecure. She and Harold part on an unpromising note. Neither appeared in the follow-up interview, but it is seen that Tamila has failed to elicit a response from Harold who says he has forgiven her, but is not interested in reestablishing contact with her. The Armani Brown page had yet to be deleted. Special Guest Star: Angel Haze
42	4	"Daisy & Marcus"	March 18, 2015	1.35
Tyler Oakley and Nev help Daisy meet Marcus, whom she met through Instagram. Marcus has been the recipient of numerous gifts from Daisy, including a camera of $1000. Marcus is a video producer, but declines offers to chat with Daisy. With much ado over not wanting his private life to be in the public eye, Marcus finally agrees to meet with Daisy. He is genuine, but is not completely open about his feelings towards her. Ultimately, Daisy revealed that Marcus will always be significant to her while he says that he is not ready to pursue a romantic relationship, but they continue to remain great friends. Special Guest Star: Tyler Oakley
43	5	"Chitara & Priscilla"	March 25, 2015	1.09
Alex Shaffer joins Nev in this episode. Chitara is a 28-year-old mother of two who has fallen in love with 22-year-old Priscilla, a professional nurse, on MocoSpace. Chitara's plans to meet or video chat with Priscilla did not materialize. Six months into the relationship, Priscilla reveals that her mother died and shortly after, she states that she has moved on from Chitara and fallen in love with a male. On investigating Priscilla's MocoSpace profile, suggestive comments are found to have been posted by a female named Kiloni who states that she is a lesbian. Kiloni has multiple counterfeit profiles across the internet. When contacted on the phone, Priscilla suggests that Chitara should move on with her life just as she did, but agrees to meet with her. Priscilla is revealed to be an 18-year-old girl named Ashanti who states that she has been using fake profiles since she was 13 as an escape from her depressing reality. Two months later, it is seen that Chitara is focusing on raising her children and has terminated contact with Ashanti, who refused the follow-up interview. The Priscilla profile has not been active since. Special Guest Star: Alex Shaffer
44	6	"Felipe & Jasmin"	April 1, 2015	1.13
Felipe, a father of one, met Jasmin on Facebook and they've been in a Facebook relationship for 8 months. Jasmin says that she is a 22-year-old model who has no phone. When Felipe insists on meeting, she abruptly becomes unavailable indefinitely. The picture she uses is discovered to belong to a Paris Roxanne who was once a victim of serious blackmail. When contacted, Jasmin challenges Nev's identity, but agrees to meet. Jasmin is revealed to be Luis, best friend of Felipe's one-time girlfriend Alex. Luis reveals that the fake account was created as an escape and a release from hatred and anger as he was molested by a teacher at a young age. In the follow-up, Luis reveals that he is repentant and says that he wishes for a friendship with Felipe, who has forgiven Luis and is in a relationship.
45	7	"Whitney & Bre"	April 12, 2015	1.00
Whitney met Bre, an exotic dancer from California, on an internet dating site and they have been in a relationship for four and a half years. Bre constantly fabricates excuses to evade video-chatting and Facebook and cites financial issues. Whitney says that she has only a limited number of pictures of Bre who claims to not have WiFi but has a VoIP number. Bre's pictures are revealed to be those of a girl named Kash. Bre's Twitter account comes with a different picture but she is proved to be from L.A. When Kash is contacted, she discloses that Bre is her friend who has misused her pictures on a prior occasion. On logging into Whitney's Facebook account Nev and Max learn that she has a close-knit relationship with a girl named Luscious which she had informed them was the word "Bre" had tattooed on her leg. In a Catfish first, Nev and Max uncover that Whitney's motive was to get a free plane ticket to meet Bre. Envisaging the episode to compromise the show, an MTV executive was consulted who advised them to use their discretion. Bre apologizes over the phone and Whitney is taken to LA. In the follow-up, both Whitney's and Bre's financial situations have ameliorated and they have become a couple with visitation plans.
-	-	"Stephanie & David"	April 8, 2015	1.03
In a previously-unaired episode from Season 1, Stephanie has been talking to David on Facebook for 7 months. Both of them are Los Angeles residents, but Dave cooks up excuses when a meet-up is proposed. A Google Image search pops up numerous results for the pictures being employed by Dave and they are of a man named Cayron. Dave is fickle minded about meeting Stephanie, but finally gives in. He is revealed to be a man named Dawuan who lied about his looks and job. Stephanie is highly offended and is blatant about her feelings. Dawuan discloses that he created the fake profile to stalk his ex and it also stemmed from a low self-esteem issue. Stephanie terminated contact with him after the incident and has been dating somebody else since.
46	8	"Jamey & Ari"	April 22, 2015	1.15
Jamey met Ari on a dating site and they have had exchanges over five months. Ari told Jamey that she would like to meet him on Catfish as a secret of hers needed disclosure, thus prompting her to contact the show. They have seen each other's faces via Skype and Ari possesses both a YouTube channel and a Google Plus account, none of which points at her being phony. However, a Facebook post that mentions her "in-laws" and her "man" engendered the possibility that she is married. Jamey is aware that she was once involved with a man called Caz. Ari first meets Nev and Max alone and divulges that she is transgender. On meeting with Jamey, she repudiates Jamey's attempt to communicate and walks away. In the follow-up, Jamey admits that he maintains sporadic contact with Ari while exploring the Houston nightlife. Ari has had an arduous time acclimatizing herself to her loss, but allows herself to be incentivized by other transgender women who have found love.
47	9	"Blaire & Markie"	April 29, 2015	0.92
Blaire, recently rendered homeless, met Markie on Instagram. A week prior to their arranged meeting, Markie alleges that she was kidnapped; a week later she calls Blaire claiming to be in a psychiatric hospital, then renounces her romantic feelings for Blaire, but still exercises control over her. Blaire called it quits as she still harbored feelings for a former lover. Nev and Max deduce that her Facebook activity is normal despite the supposed abduction, but find her Instagram details disturbing. Over the phone, Markie's acquaintances confirm her to be a compulsive liar with one stating that she actually ran away from home to get attention and recently received a suspension from school for carrying a switchblade. In their first attempt to meet Markie in person, she is stated as having gone away with friends indefinitely, but she later meets Blaire and confesses that she was browbeaten and inveigled into the kidnapping by an undisclosed male companion and Nev reproves her for employing smooth-operating tactics with Blaire. In the epilogue, Markie states that she has tweaked her honesty and maintains contact with Blaire who is moving to Florida and no longer has amorous sentiments for Markie.
48	10	"Steven & Samm"	May 6, 2015	0.93
Steve's mother contacts the show to ensure that the girl Samm with whom Steve is in love is genuine. When she is contacted, she states that she has something to disclose to Steve. On meeting him, it is shown that her pictures and her identity were not deceitful, but she has been involved in similar relationships with other men. An emotional ending ensued, after which Steve let go of the relationship.
-	-	"Where Are They Now?"	May 13, 2015	0.82
49	11	"Tiana & James"	July 8, 2015	1.02
Tiana, a 21-year-old woman from North Carolina, met her first love on Myspace three years prior to contacting Nev and Max. James is a 24-year-old who also lives in North Carolina, which raises a red flag as to why they live in the same state but haven't met in three years. Tiana has not revealed to James that she has a 3-year-old daughter, who was born just before they started talking. James and Tiana rely on text-messaging and phone calls since James claims that he can't video-chat. When Nev and Max look up "James Sloan" on Facebook, they find a middle-aged white man whom Max describes as "your worst nightmare" when it comes to meeting people online. Tiana and the crew, along with Tiana's best friend Aisha, go to meet James. They arrive at a mechanic shop about 10 minutes from Tiana's house, and she says that this is the shop of her baby's father's cousin. The person, however, ends up being Trez, the father of Aisha's baby. Tiana believes that Aisha had set this up all along, so Tiana and Aisha are no longer friends and still had not made up months later, nor has Tiana spoken to Trez since the incident.
50	12	"Falesha & Jacqueline"	July 15, 2015	0.73
Falesha's name and pictures were stolen by a fake profile that nearly ruined her life. She thought her troubles were behind her, but four years later her past comes back to haunt her.
51	13	"Prophet & Trinity"	July 22, 2015	0.94
A Grammy-nominated rapper is duped into believing he's talking to a beautiful girl named Trinity, but the image is really of model Jasmine Sanders and the person behind the photo is someone he never expected.
52	14	"Thad & Sara"	July 29, 2015	1.06
Thad sought refuge from his struggling marriage through an online relationship with Sara, but when she starts telling strange tales of seizures and kidnappings, Thad starts to question her true identity.
53	15	"Andria & David"	August 5, 2015	0.90
David is the only love Andria has ever known and she lives for his passionate love letters and voice-messages, but after 10 years they still have never met. Andria needs to know what David is hiding.
54	16	"Ayissha & Sydney"	August 12, 2015	0.50
Sydney and Ayissha were in an online romance for years before Sydney revealed she is not who she says. Although she continues to lie about her identity, Aiyssha is still in love with Sydney.
55	17	"Hundra & Emily"	August 19, 2015	0.96
Hundra never planned to fall in love with a girl, and now she is risking coming out on national TV to learn if her love with Emily is for real. Special Guest Star: Machine Gun Kelly
56	18	"Devan & Rylan"	August 26, 2015	0.98
For shy Devan, meeting Rylan was love at first click and she wants to believe, so needs to find out, if Rylan is marriage material. Special Guest Star: Todrick Hall
57	19	"Brittany & Bryon"	August 30, 2015	0.90
When single mom Brittany finds love online with Bryon, a Marine who may get deployed to Iraq again, she seeks Nev and Max's help before she runs out of time.

=== Season 5 (2016) ===
No. overall	No. in season	Title	Original release date	U.S. viewers (millions)
58	1	"Dejay, Malik & Josiah"	February 24, 2016	0.77
A catfish first: Two men may be dating the same catfish. Nev and Max bring them together to find out who they have both been in a relationship with for several years.
59	2	"Jeanette & Derick"	March 2, 2016	0.76
Mother doesn't always know best. Concerned daughter Shuntay enlists the help of Nev and Max after her mother Jeanette starts talking about marriage and uprooting her family to be with a man who refuses to meet her in person.
60	3	"Leuh & Justin"	March 9, 2016	0.83
Since Leuh saw surfer Justin it's been insta-love! But after 2 failed attempts to meet up, she's desperate to figure out if Justin really is the man of her dreams or if she's one in a long line of online lovers.
-	-	"Best Moments Ever"	March 16, 2016	0.43
61	4	"Brendan & McKenna"	March 17, 2016	0.77
Brandon loves McKenna, but failed attempts to connect has left him wondering if McKenna is for real. Nev teams with social-media sensation Karrueche Tran to help Brandon uncover the shocking truth of his true love. Special Guest Star: Karrueche Tran
62	5	"Jaylin & Ja'la"	March 23, 2016	1.00
Jaylin is prepared to sacrifice a lifelong friendship and a promising videogame career to be with a woman he's never even spoken to on the phone. Nev and Max help him discover that sometimes the truth is stranger than fiction.
63	6	"Michael & Chanelle"	March 30, 2016	0.82
Michael felt that he had no time for a relationship, but love appeared in a DM. Chanelle is the light he's needed in his life, but out of the blue she's disappeared, leaving only Nev and Max to help him find his missing love.
64	7	"Ray & Lexi"	April 6, 2016	0.93
Ray is determined to finally meet Lexi, his online love of four years. But after learning that Lexi's sister has meddled in the relationship in the past, Nev and Max find themselves with more questions than answers.
65	8	"Joanna & Bo"	April 13, 2016	0.98
Tattoo model, Joanna, was about to meet her online love in the flesh, but a crazy night in Vegas caused the whole relationship to go sour. Now she's enlisted Nev and Max to help track down her former flame and make things right.
66	9	"Tyreme & Tomorrow"	April 20, 2016	0.90
Tyreme met the beautiful Tomorrow online over 9 months ago. They share a deep bond and Tyreme is ready to uproot his life to be with her. Will Nev and Max be able help Tyreme finally meet his Tomorrow?
-	-	"The Ones That Got Away"	April 20, 2016	0.72
67	10	"Kayla & Courtney"	April 27, 2016	1.01
When Kayla was two, her father killed her mother and later committed suicide. Years later, Kayla is sent a message from Courtney, a woman claiming to be channeling her dead father's spirit.
68	11	"Paris & Tara"	May 4, 2016	0.76
Paris enlists Nev and Max to help her figure out who has been catfishing her for the past four years. But as the guys investigate, they make a shocking discovery that casts suspicion onto Paris herself!
69	12	"Vince & Alyssa"	May 11, 2016	0.66
Vince can't seem to escape his online ex Alyssa, whose stalking has caused his real-life girlfriend Liz to break up with him. Nev and Max help him confront Alyssa so he can try to salvage a future with Liz.
70	13	"Lucas & Many"	August 10, 2016	0.90
Former Playboy model Jayme, has learned that her online boyfriend is not only fake, but also appears to be catfishing other women! She enlists Nev and Max to help find the catfish and put an end to his perverted deception.
71	14	"Larissa & Anthony"	August 10, 2016	0.81
Larissa was in an online relationship for three years with a man named " Jose", which later turned out to be her friend pretending to be a man since she herself was in love with Larissa. After the heartbreaking truth was revealed she found comfort in her online friend Anthony. They soon began dating but his strange behavior had Larissa wondering if she was once again being catfished. So she called Nev and Max to help her find out the truth about Anthony.The most worrisome part was that Larissa had sent him 500 dollars. Upon some initial research by Nev and Max they find out that most of the information Anthony gave Larissa was truthful, he was from California, and he had worked at a car rental shop and later went to Alaska to work at a cannery. When they call the car rental shop to confirm his identity they find out his name is not Anthony but in a strange twist is actually Jose. The photos he was using actually belonged to someone he knew that stole his girlfriend at the time. When confronted in Alaska he admits that he used Larissa for money and to him it was a game but he then thought of her as a friend. He's in Alaska to restart his life after getting into legal trouble. When talking to Larissa he admits that he only said hurtful things to her to make her leave him so he didn't have to face the truth. He always runs away from his problems instead of facing them. In the catch up Larissa reveals Jose was in prison and had reached out to her to try and rekindle their relationship.
72	15	"Spencer & Katy"	August 17, 2016	0.74
Spencer has been having an online relationship for 6 years with who he claims is the actual singer Katy Perry. He says they met on a messenger app and have been speaking on and off ever since. He says that she sends him songs before they are even released but when Nev and Max look at the links they are from random Youtube videos that are no longer available. Spencer has also made a ring for Katy using his great-grandmother's emerald stone. When Nev and Max search the phone number and email address Spencer had for "Katy Perry", they find the number linked to a Canadian phone which Spencer claims was the number Katy used while in Canada. When they search for the email they find it linked to a girl named Harriet, on her profile she lists herself as being from Canada and is a huge Katy Perry fan. Harriet moved from Canada to the UK. Even with the evidence shown to him, he still believes that he is talking to Katy and Harriet is a fake profile that Katy herself made 6 years ago to hide their relationship. They reach out to a girl named Amy that was commenting on Harriets Facebook page, she says that she was actually Harriet's ex-girlfriend and Harriet herself is a lesbian. That leads Spencer to further believe he couldn't have been talking to Harriet but instead the real Katy Perry. Harriet herself comes to the hotel that Nev and Spencer are staying to meet Spencer and the team. Even being face to face with Harriet and she confirms that it was her on the app and in the emails, she even gives details that were in the messages but Spencer still refuses to believe that it was not really Katy that he spent the last 6 years with. Nev and Max have to use tough love to try and get Spencer to accept that it's not actually Katy he's been in love with but Harriet. Even after the trip he still had doubts and emailed Harriet as if she was still Katy. He later claimed to have accepted that it was actually Harriet, not Katy.
73	16	"Candic & Titus"	August 24, 2016	0.88
After months of intimate text exchanges with a man she met online, named Titus, Candic has decided to finally stop and fess up to her husband. But before she does, she needs Nev and Max to help her find out who Titus really is!
74	17	"Andrea, Alex & Andrea"	August 31, 2016	0.65
Fans of popular YouTube star, Andrea Russett, summon Nev and Max to help catch a potential stalker who is impersonating Andrea's family online. The guys soon uncover a web of fake profiles much larger than they thought possible.
75	18	"Catherine & Graham"	September 7, 2016	0.77
Long Islander Catherine has fallen deeply in love with country boy Graham from Tennessee. She's ready to uproot her life to be a country girl with him, but Nev and Max uncover that Graham's not everything he claims to be.
76	19	"Luis & Sydney"	September 14, 2016	0.66
Luis has fallen in love with a single mom who is down on her luck and now he's ready to take their online relationship to the next level. But first, Nev and Max must help him make sure that she is who she says she is!
77	20	"Andrew & Zack"	September 21, 2016	0.62
Andrew thought he met the perfect Tinder match in Zack until a text-message from a friend reveals shocking new information. As Nev and Max look into the case, they suspect Zac could be keeping a very big secret.

=== Season 6 (2017) ===
Note: Nev Schulman is absent in episodes 5-6 due to paternity leave.

No. overall	No. in season	Title	Original release date	U.S. viewers (millions)
-	-	"Top Ten Holy Shit Catfish Moments"	February 25, 2017	0.40
-	-	"Hooked On Love"	February 25, 2017	0.38
78	1	"Shawny & Jack"	March 1, 2017	0.83
79	2	"Alante & Nevaeh"	March 8, 2017	0.66
80	3	"Danny & Rosa"	March 15, 2017	0.68
81	4	"Telizza & Shai"	March 22, 2017	0.65
82	5	"Marvin & Austin"	March 29, 2017	0.65
83	6	"Mecca & Tanner"	April 5, 2017	0.61
84	7	"Yasmine & Lewis"	April 12, 2017	0.57
85	8	"Kailani & Sam"	April 19, 2017	0.63
86	9	"Ari & Lanum"	April 26, 2017	0.52
87	10	"Dylan & Ally"	May 3, 2017	0.69
88	11	"Colleen & Tony"	May 10, 2017	0.76
89	12	"Open Investigation"	May 17, 2017	0.65
-	-	"Still Hooked"	May 24, 2017	0.52
-	-	"The Untold Stories"	May 31, 2017	0.53
-	-	"The Untold Stories"	June 7, 2017	0.49
-	-	"It's a Cat Cat Cat Catfish World"	June 28, 2017	0.41
90	13	"Johnny & Connor"	June 28, 2017	0.58
91	14	"Kelsie & Brandon"	July 5, 2017	0.87
92	15	"April & Dean"	July 12, 2017	0.70
93	16	"Robert & Ashleigh"	July 19, 2017	0.83
94	17	"Robin & Wayne"	July 26, 2017	0.61
-	-	"Liar Liar Catfish On Fire"	August 2, 2017	0.55
-	-	"When Catfish Broke The Internet"	August 9, 2017	0.50
95	18	"Nicole & Nicole"	August 16, 2017	0.62
96	19	"Jose & Jay"	August 23, 2017	0.57
97	20	"Caitlyn & Kenton"	August 30, 2017	0.69
-	-	"What Kind of Catfish Are You?"	September 6, 2017	0.46

=== Season 7 (2018–2019) ===
No. overall	No. in season	Title	Original release date	U.S. viewers (millions)
-	-	"To Catch A Catfish"	December 27, 2017	0.41
98	1	"Sheklia & Talli"	January 3, 2018	0.59
99	2	"Alyssa & Tyler"	January 10, 2018	0.72
100	3	"Kim & Matt"	January 17, 2018	0.66
101	4	"Lawrence & Cierra"	January 24, 2018	0.68
102	5	"Mary & Adam"	January 31, 2018	0.53
103	6	"Zak & Garrett"	February 7, 2018	0.60
104	7	"Traves & Candy"	February 14, 2018	0.53
105	8	"Mandy & Jose"	February 21, 2018	0.65
106	9	"Infiniti & Dave"	February 28, 2018	0.54
107	10	"Dylan & Savenia"	March 7, 2018	0.66
-	-	"Catfish Keeps it 100: Dear Nev & Max"	March 14, 2018	0.33
-	-	"Catfish Keeps it 100: The Young and the Catfished"	April 4, 2018	0.39
-	-	"Catfish Keeps it 100: Catfish Breaks the Internet Again"	April 11, 2018	0.26
-	-	"Catfish Keeps it 100: The Aftershock"	April 18, 2018	0.38
-	-	"Catfish Keeps it 100: Top 10 Most Wanted"	April 25, 2018	0.28
-	-	"Catfish Keeps it 100: Charlamagne's Favorite Fucking Catfish Moments"	May 4, 2018	0.19
-	-	"Catfish Keeps it 100: Creepy Catfish Countdown"	May 11, 2018	N/A
108	11	"Kiaira & Cortney"	July 11, 2018	0.74
109	12	"Nina & Jon"	July 11, 2018	0.62
110	13	"Angel & Jordan"	July 18, 2018	0.66
Guest co-host: Laura Perlongo.
-	-	"Catfish: Trolls"	July 18, 2018	0.57
111	14	"Breana & Josh"	July 25, 2018	0.66
112	15	"Chelsea & Charles"	August 1, 2018	0.58
113	16	"Nae & Brandon"	August 8, 2018	0.60
114	17	"Derek & Annabelle"	August 15, 2018	0.63
Guest co-host: Laura Perlongo
-	-	"Catfish Keeps it 100: Where Are They Now?"	August 22, 2018	0.50
115	18	"Nick & Jasmine"	August 29, 2018	0.64
Note: Max Joseph's last episode
116	19	"Mike & Joey"	September 22, 2018 (Netherlands & Flanders); November 28, 2018 (US)	0.51
Guest co-host: Jane Carrey
117	20	"Rachael & Vance"	December 5, 2018	0.58
Guest co-host: Kamie Crawford
118	21	"Sheila & Rich Dollaz"	December 12, 2018	0.61
Guest co-host: Nick Young
119	22	"Chelsea & Lennie"	December 19, 2018	0.54
Guest co-host: Tallulah Willis
120	23	"Truth & Ray'Quan"	December 26, 2018	0.59
Guest co-host: Zeke Thomas
121	24	"Shakinah & Chris"	January 2, 2019	0.56
Guest co-host: Kamie Crawford
122	25	"Dallas & Safari"	January 2, 2019	0.52
Guest co-host: Tallulah Willis
123	26	"Aubri & Brian"	January 9, 2019	0.53
Guest co-host: Slick Woods
124	27	"Nique & Alice"	January 16, 2019	0.50
Guest co-host: Elle King
125	28	"Deven & James"	January 23, 2019	0.45
Guest co-host: Rashad Jennings
126	29	"Mathan & Leah"	June 12, 2019	0.54
Guest co-host: Kamie Crawford
127	30	"Kristina & Faith"	June 19, 2019	0.49
Guest co-host: Tallulah Willis
128	31	"Oceanna & Nelly"	June 26, 2019	0.34
Guest co-host: Slick Woods
129	32	"Angel & Remy"	July 3, 2019	0.41
Guest co-host: Elle King
130	33	"Kaden & Adriana"	July 10, 2019	0.48
Guest co-host: Kamie Crawford
131	34	"Taylor & Christian"	July 17, 2019	0.62
Guest co-host: Tallulah Willis
132	35	"Matthew & Chance"	July 24, 2019	0.57
Guest co-host: Kimiko Glenn
133	36	"Shirlene & James"	July 31, 2019	0.55
Guest co-host: Kamie Crawford
134	37	"CJ & Shana"	August 7, 2019	0.52
Guest co-host: Justin Combs
135	38	"Tristyn & Lara"	August 7, 2019	0.54
Guest co-host: Kamie Crawford
136	39	"Cherie & Avion"	August 14, 2019	0.56
Guest co-host: Justin Combs
137	40	"Angel & Antonio"	August 21, 2019	0.44
Guest co-host: Laura Perlongo

=== Season 8 (2020–2024) ===
No. overall	No. in season	Title	Original release date	U.S. viewers (millions)
138	1	"Red & Jalissa"	January 8, 2020	0.48
Red started talking to Jalissa through mutual friends, but they have yet to meet in person.
139	2	"Antonnio & Alfred"	January 15, 2020	0.46
Alfred just broke up with Antonnio for an online match: Adonis.
140	3	"Sparkayla & Maritha"	January 22, 2020	0.46
Maritha claims to be Sparkayla's lost half-sister, but Sparkayla's wife is afraid she is hiding her real identity.
141	4	"Jesus & Alexis"	January 29, 2020	0.50
Jesus is in a relationship with Alexis, but an anonymous source that calls herself "Baby A" informs him that his girlfriend does not exist.
142	5	"Joseph & Sabrina"	February 5, 2020	0.39
Joseph has financially helped a woman he met online after a devastating loss in her life, but the lack of video chat sparks suspect in Joseph's sister.
143	6	"William & Jamie"	February 12, 2020	0.41
Akirra contacts Nev and Kamie claiming that his boyfriend, William, is being harassed by a past online lover. William does not mind the attention, especially since Jamie is also sending him money.
144	7	"Danielle & BJ"	February 19, 2020	0.43
Danielle has been in an online relationship with BJ for the past six years, but after being found, BJ tells her that she was talking to his married brother Devon for the last two years.
145	8	"DeJohn & Cashay"	February 26, 2020	0.43
DeJohn is in an online relationship with Cashay and plans on proposing to her, even though they only saw each other through video chat.
146	9	"Aaliyah & Jaquan"	March 4, 2020	0.40
Aaliyah has been talking with Jaquan for a year, but the two have yet to meet and, after Nev and Kamie find out Jaquan's secret Facebook page, she starts being doubtful.
147	10	"Gemini & Myranda"	March 11, 2020	0.42
Gemini found an online friend in Myranda. Nev and Kamie discover that it is another identity of an already known catfish.
148	11	"Jason & Keith"	August 5, 2020	0.46 (MTV); 0.14 (VH1)
Jason has been in contact with Keith for 2 years, but the two have yet to see each other via video chat, despite Jason sending Keith a new phone. Nev and Kamie find out the truth after analyzing Keith's Instagram profile.
149	12	"Kristen & Sarah"	August 12, 2020	0.30
Recovering from a divorce, Kristen has been in contact with Sarah, but the latter always refuses video chats and phone calls. A third person, Chloe, contacts Nev and Kamie, claiming that her and Kristen have been in contact as well, and that she is using the situation to get closer to her.
150	13	"Dre & Casey"	August 19, 2020	0.36
Despite being in a relationship with Rebecca, Dre has been flirting with Casey via Instagram. Kamie suspects Dre's girlfriend is the one behind the catfish.
151	14	"Dustin & Keegan"	August 26, 2020	0.34
Since his stepfather never accepted his homosexuality, Dustin relied on Keegan after meeting him through Facebook.
152	15	"Kirsten & Alex"	September 2, 2020	0.36
153	16	"Stephanie & Danny"	September 9, 2020	0.38
Stephanie first met Danny on Facebook in 2010, but has yet to meet him in person. She remains hopeful because his Instagram profile seems real.
154	17	"Zay & Jayda"	September 16, 2020	0.35
155	18	"Ryan & Micah"	September 23, 2020	0.37
Ryan has been in contact with Micah for a month. Nev and Kamie discover that the pictures he has been receiving are from Micah's OnlyFans account and suspect a third person is subscribed to Micah's account and sending Ryan the pictures.
156	19	"Dianela & Jose"	October 7, 2020	0.35
Dianela and Jose have been in an online relationship for almost four years. At the time they were both in Venezuela, but now that they moved in the United States, Dianela hopes that they will be able to finally see each other.
157	20	"Brooklyn & Jason"	October 14, 2020	0.48
158	21	"Jay & Anna"	October 28, 2020	0.36
159	22	"Jeanette, Kiara & Patrick"	November 4, 2020	0.35
160	23	"Jake & Taylor"	November 11, 2020	0.41
161	24	"Tony & Tiana"	November 18, 2020	0.35
162	25	"Eric & Lianna"	December 1, 2020	0.39
163	26	"Scooba & Renae"	December 8, 2020	0.28
164	27	"DeJuan & Tynea"	December 15, 2020	0.37
165	28	"Michael & Julia"	December 22, 2020	0.31
166	29	"Jason & Mar"	December 29, 2020	0.42
167	30	"Will & Cherry"	January 5, 2021	0.34
168	31	"Tam & Jamena"	January 12, 2021	0.32
169	32	"Paul & Caitea"	January 19, 2021	0.39
170	33	"Tyler & Stefany"	May 4, 2021	0.49
171	34	"Courtney & Chris"	May 11, 2021	0.43
172	35	"Imari & ?"	May 18, 2021	0.41
173	36	"Bryn & Stephanie"	May 25, 2021	0.37
174	37	"Apryl & Daryl"	June 1, 2021	0.32
175	38	"Michael & Dustin"	June 8, 2021	0.38
176	39	"Jeremiah & Linda"	June 15, 2021	0.29
177	40	"Aaliyah & Paula"	June 22, 2021	0.29
178	41	"Nyhjee & Cianna"	June 29, 2021	0.39
179	42	"Aaron & Treyvon"	July 6, 2021	0.36
180	43	"Alexis & Jaymes"	July 13, 2021	0.37
181	44	"Deonn & Lanise"	July 20, 2021	0.26
182	45	"Zark & Roger"	July 27, 2021	0.40
183	46	"Brittany & Mark"	August 3, 2021	0.37
184	47	"Dey & Cody"	August 10, 2021	0.36
185	48	"Kailan & Jordan"	August 17, 2021	0.41
186	49	"Diamond & Steve"	August 24, 2021	0.32
187	50	"Vonni & Andrew"	August 31, 2021	0.40
188	51	"Myldred, India & KJ"	January 5, 2022	0.37
189	52	"Tracii & Ace"	January 12, 2022	0.40
Tracii wants to fly to Miami to meet model Ace Davis, but finds out later on with the help of Catfish Investigators Nev and Kamie that Ace's real name is Tyrone Evans Clark.
190	53	"Romeo & Michael"	January 19, 2022	0.33
191	54	"Adam & Mercy"	January 26, 2022	0.36
192	55	"Emma & EJ"	February 9, 2022	0.31
193	56	"Gabby & Kendrick"	February 16, 2022	0.32
194	57	"William & Breezy"	February 23, 2022	0.36
195	58	"Hayley & Britani"	March 2, 2022	0.35
196	59	"Pamela & Fernando"	March 9, 2022	0.30
197	60	"Onyx & Lola"	March 16, 2022	0.37
198	61	"Victoria & Anthony"	May 31, 2022	0.44
199	62	"Nick & England"	June 7, 2022	0.38
200	63	"Ivy & Dante"	June 14, 2022	0.41
Guest co-host: Max Joseph
201	64	"Keontae & Tyler"	June 21, 2022	0.38
202	65	"Kaycee & Mike"	June 28, 2022	0.38
203	66	"Reese & Jesica"	July 5, 2022	0.46
204	67	"Kimberly & Flavour"	July 12, 2022	0.41
205	68	"Charles & Nikki"	July 19, 2022	0.44
206	69	"Rudy & Tyrell"	July 26, 2022	0.46
207	70	"John & Megan"	August 2, 2022	0.37
208	71	"Mark & Taylor"	August 9, 2022	0.45
209	72	"Angel & Sharon"	August 16, 2022	0.41
-	-	"Making Waves: 10 Years of Catfish"	August 23, 2022	N/A
-	-	"Catfish: Sweet and Sour"	August 30, 2022	N/A
210	73	"Malcolm & Missy"	February 28, 2023	0.40
When Malcolm was in jail, he was thrilled to get emotional support from his online gf Missy. But once he got out, Missy became elusive! Were Missy's affections a scam? Or can team Catfish help Malcolm meet the love of his life?
211	74	"Motherwolff & David"	March 7, 2023	0.42
After 20 years, Motherwolff, a devout satanist and witch, is now ready for her true love David. Guest co-host: Dylan Sprayberry
212	75	"Shay & Ceejay"	March 14, 2023	0.33
An online love story between Shay and Ceejay turned dark after Ceejay insisted Shay have a baby with her, tracking her every move; Nev and Tallulah help Shay get answers so she can move on from the eight-year grip of Ceejay. Guest co-host: Tallulah Willis
213	76	"Angela & Justin"	March 21, 2023	0.39
After splitting from her husband of 20 years, Angela reinvented herself and is excited by her new TikTok love interest Justin; he's been dodgy about meeting, but she's ready for something real. Guest co-host: Shannon Boodram
214	77	"Sham & Phillip"	March 28, 2023	0.36
Sham has been swept off her feet by an Instagram Arab prince named Phillip, but lately Phillip's been acting shady.
215	78	"Jaquan & Shantel"	April 4, 2023	0.37
Nev and Kamie go to Rochester, New York to meet with social media video creator Jaquan, who suspects his online love interest Shantel could be a catfish. But Nev and Kamie are suspicious that he and his content co-creator Justyn are using this scenario as a publicity stunt.
216	79	"Erika & Jermaine"	April 11, 2023	0.41
"Selfie queen" Erika, who lives in Texas, has been chatting online with film producer Jermaine and wants to move to Los Angeles to be with him. However, Jermaine seems to be elusive about meeting up and disclosing any of his personal life and family status.
217	80	"Jacob & Stephanie"	April 18, 2023	0.38
Jacob's tough life turned bright the day Stephanie popped into his livestream; now, with all his hopes hanging on Stephanie, Nev and Kamie struggle with an impossible decision as they fear Stephanie may be too good to be true.
218	81	"William & Carmella"	April 25, 2023	0.42
William falls hard for Carmella, but after spending hours on the phone, sharing the most intimate details together, Carmella won't meet up or even videochat; Nev and Kamie help William figure out what secrets Carmella is hiding.
219	82	"Shi & Mira"	October 3, 2023	0.32
Shi is convinced his online love Mira also lives in Philadelphia, but after months, she's dodgy about meeting. When Nev and Kamie discover she might live just five blocks away, they hit the streets of Philly looking for answers.
220	83	"Cody & Brittany"	October 10, 2023	0.30
Cody claims he met Brittany in real life and that she tracked him down on Snapchat. He's deep in love and has sent her thousands of dollars. Cody's concerned grandmother calls for Nev and Kamie's help in hunting down Brittany.
221	84	"Jasmine & Ryan"	October 17, 2023	0.41
Jasmine has dealt with hardship and loss at every step of her life, that is until she met Ryan. He's perfect, but never shows up! His excuses of why he cannot meet have Nev and Kamie wondering if Ryan might be lying.
222	85	"Tee & Ibraheem"	October 24, 2023	0.34
Tee and Ibraheem are so deeply in love that Ibraheem decided to get a neck tattoo of her name. The only problem-Tee lied about her name when they first met! If Ibraheem and his tattoo are real, will their love survive the fallout?
223	86	"Matt & Elise"	October 31, 2023	0.31
Matt's smitten with TikToker Elise, but Nev and guest host Devyn Simone see red flags on the horizon. When asked to meet, Elise says she's worried about upsetting Nev! Who is this mystery girl and what's her connection to Nev? Guest co-host: Devyn Simone
224	87	"Moses & Krystal"	November 7, 2023	0.37
After a tough divorce, Moses found new hope in Krystal. But despite living close by, Krystal won't meet up. The more Nev and Kamie dig into 'Krystal' the more shocked and determined they are to find answers to this bizarre case.
225	88	"Zach & Lexi"	November 14, 2023	0.39
When Zach matched with Lexi online, he couldn't believe his luck - it seemed like a lifetime of dating woes might be over. Now Nev and Kamie can't believe it either as they dig deeper to discuss Lexi might be too good to be true.
226	89	"Jass & Kayla"	November 21, 2023	0.43
After Jass got Lillian's name tattooed on her, Jass discovered that Lillian's pictures were fake and that her name is really Kayla. Nev and Kamie help Jass find out who she's really been talking to and if her name is even Kayla.
227	90	"Eli & Boulevard"	November 28, 2023	0.47
Nev and Laura Perlongo go on a wild ride to help Eli, who fell so hard for fellow gamer Boulevard, that he moved from Alaska to Chicago to be with her. Guest co-host: Laura Perlongo
228	91	"LaDaris & Julie"	December 5, 2023	0.38
Iraq veteran LaDaris has been in love with Julie for years, despite her cancelling plans to meet several times; she has a mysterious twin sister getting in between them, so Nev and Kamie help LaDaris figure things out.
229	92	"Genesis & Jerison"	December 12, 2023	0.40
Comedian Percy Rustomji joins Nev in helping Genesis find Jerison, a man she met 12 years ago on Facebook and recently reconnected with. Guest co-host: Percy Rustomji
230	93	"Ciatta & Juan"	December 19, 2023	0.29
Ciatta has a bright family future planned with her perfect man Juan. But before Nev and Kamie give their blessings on Ciatta's move to LA to be with him, they uncover details on Juan that her life plans into question.
231	94	"Sasha & Essence"	December 26, 2023	0.41
Sasha is in a wild flirtationship with Essence, and is ready for the next level; Essence says she's in an open relationship with her man, but Sasha feels like she is keeping a secret. Guest co-host: Elle King
232	95	"Leanna & Jordan"	January 2, 2024	0.45
Leanna fell so hard for Jordan that she sent him thousands of dollars! Though she's never met Jordan in person she did meet his cousin. Armed with only a sketch, Nev and Kamie go on a manhunt searching for the cousin.
235	96 (Note: While MTV list this episode as part of season 8, it aired during a timeframe where season 9 was already airing)	"Mohammed & Ashley"	May 7, 2024	N/A
236	97	"Joey & Marrissa"	May 7, 2024	N/A
237	98	"Alaysia & Qua"	May 14, 2024	N/A
238	99	"LeeAndre & Russia"	May 14, 2024	N/A

=== Season 9 (2024) ===
No. overall	No. in season	Title	Original release date	U.S. viewers (millions)
233	1	"Jeni & Elijah"	April 30, 2024 (Note: While MTV list this episode as part of season 9, it aired before some of the episodes in season 8)	N/A
234	2	"Kay & Tyreek"	April 30, 2024	N/A
239	3	"Arturo & Laura"	May 21, 2024	N/A
240	4	"Zahra & T"	May 28, 2024	N/A
Guest co-host: Max Joseph
241	5	"Cristian & Chantel"	June 4, 2024	N/A
242	6	"Kash & Kenya"	June 11, 2024	N/A
243	7	"Jeremy & Alex"	June 18, 2024	N/A
244	8	"Ayla & Gabby"	June 25, 2024	N/A
245	9	"Omar & Iris"	July 2, 2024	N/A
246	10	"Sebastian & Allison"	July 9, 2024	N/A
247	11	"Reign & Piers"	July 16, 2024	N/A
