= RJ King =

American model (born 1992)

- Born: Robert Jackson King III; April 1, 1992 (age 34); Columbia, Missouri, U.S.
- Modeling information
- Height: 6 ft 2 in (188 cm)
- Hair color: Blonde
- Eye color: Hazel
- Agency: Wilhelmina Models (New York, Los Angeles, London); Bananas Models (Paris); Elite Model Management (Milan); Kult Australia (Sydney); Sight Management Studio (Barcelona); Scoop Models (Copenhagen); Modelwerk (Hamburg); MP Management (Stockholm); Nest Model Management (Berlin)

Robert Jackson "RJ" King III (born April 1, 1992) is an American male model. He has appeared on the cover of Vogue Italia twice.

== Early life ==
He was born in Columbia, Missouri, on April 1, 1992. His sisters Meghan King Edmonds, Julie King, and Caitlin King are also in the entertainment or sports industries.

== Career ==
He is represented by IMG Models. King was discovered at a mall in St. Louis.

King has modeled for Tommy Hilfiger, Michael Kors, Dolce & Gabbana, Uniqlo, Max Mara, Samsung, Armani Exchange, Prada (as an exclusive), Hermès, John Varvatos, Yves Saint Laurent, Louis Vuitton, Moncler, Salvatore Ferragamo, J. Crew, Carven, and Banana Republic, Rag & Bone, Brooks Brothers, and DSquared2 among others. His first job was for i-D magazine. He has also appeared in W and GQ Germany.

In 2012, King was featured in the first episode of Catfish: The TV Show. 18 year old bisexual woman Chelsea Browning had used King's photos to catfish a 23 year old heterosexual woman, Sunny Cross. King himself made an appearance at the end of the episode and was introduced to Cross by hosts Nev Schulman and Max Joseph via a Skype call.
