= Nobody's Fool (2018 film) =

- Theatrical release poster
- Directed by: Tyler Perry
- Written by: Tyler Perry
- Produced by: Mark E. Swinton; Will Areu
- Starring: Tiffany Haddish; Tika Sumpter; Omari Hardwick; Mehcad Brooks; Amber Riley; Whoopi Goldberg
- Cinematography: Richard J. Vialet
- Edited by: Larry Sexton
- Music by: Philip White
- Production companies: Paramount Players; Tyler Perry Studios; BET Films
- Distributed by: Paramount Pictures
- Release date: November 2, 2018 (United States)
- Running time: 110 minutes
- Country: United States
- Language: English
- Budget: $19 million
- Box office: $33.7 million

Nobody's Fool is a 2018 American romantic comedy film written and directed by Tyler Perry. It stars Tiffany Haddish, Tika Sumpter, Omari Hardwick, Mehcad Brooks, Amber Riley and Whoopi Goldberg, and follows a recently paroled woman (Haddish) who tries to help her sister (Sumpter) with a man who may be catfishing her. The film marks Tyler Perry's first time involved in an R-rated comedy, as well as his first film not to be distributed by Lionsgate.

Produced by Paramount Players (as the studio's first film), Tyler Perry Studios, and BET Films, Nobody's Fool was released in the United States on November 2, 2018, by Paramount Pictures. It received negative reviews, but some praise for Haddish and Goldberg's performances. It grossed $33 million worldwide, making it one of Perry's lowest-grossing films.

== Plot ==
Danica (Tika Sumpter) is a successful worker at a marketing firm, and has been in a relationship with "Charlie" (Mehcad Brooks), a man she met online a year ago but has never seen in real life.

When she is sent to go pick up her recently paroled sister Tanya (Tiffany Haddish) from prison, her mother Lola (Whoopi Goldberg) also tells Danica that Tanya must stay at her house. Tanya is amazed by Danica's apartment, and discovers that Danica's ex-fiancé Bailey (Adrian Conrad) left her for another woman. Tanya thinks Danica is being catfished since she has never seen Charlie in person.

The next day, Tanya and Danica stop by the Brown Bean, a coffee shop next to Danica's work. Frank (Omari Hardwick), the shop's owner, who is in love with Danica, insists that he will let Tanya work at the shop. When Danica goes to pick up Tanya from work that night she accidentally walks in an AA meeting that is being held in the store and overhears that Frank used to abuse alcohol and discovers that he was in prison for seven years. Tanya contacts the reality show Catfish via email that Frank let her use. Danica receives news that Charlie now has Wi-Fi and is going to FaceTime her. The Catfish crew comes over to her house without her knowledge.

After Tanya finds out that "Charlie" is actually a man named Lawrence (Chris Rock), Danica says negative things to Tanya which upsets Tanya so much that she decides to move out and go to their mother's house. Danica shows up to work tired and unprepared to present a campaign she had been working on and gets suspended.

Tanya, Danica, and Danica's friend Kalli (Amber Riley) track down Lawrence, a man with a Jheri curl who uses a wheelchair, though is revealed to be faking his disability; Tanya sets his hair on fire, for lying to Danica.

The next day, Frank stops by to cheer up Danica, and they end up talking about their past relationships, only to end up having sex. Now, feeling weirded out by what just happened, Danica calls Kalli and tells her that she just slept with Frank and claims she doesn't find him attractive because of his criminal past, not knowing that he is still in her apartment. Now feeling guilty for hurting Frank's feelings, Danica realizes that she does like him and wants to give him a second chance. She apologizes at the coffee shop and then they have sex again. They begin to date afterwards.

Three months later, Danica and Kalli find out that Charlie is real and his account got hacked by Lawrence, Charlie's old college coach. Charlie shows up to Danica's office. Frank sees Danica leaving her job with Charlie and breaks up with her. Danica goes on an awful date with Charlie and realizes he isn't the one for her after all, and goes to win Frank back. Frank is reluctant to let Danica in his house until she sings "On Bended Knee" in the rain, something he told her he once did, and they reunite as a couple. In an end tag, Tanya, just for the fun of it, crashes Bailey's wedding as payback for him hurting her sister.

== Cast ==
- Tiffany Haddish as Tanya
- Tika Sumpter as Danica
- Omari Hardwick as Frank Johnson
- Whoopi Goldberg as Lola
- Amber Riley as Kalli
- Mehcad Brooks as Charlie
- Missi Pyle as Lauren Meadows
- Chris Rock as Lawrence
- Michael Blackson as Thug
- Jon Rudnitsky as Benji
- Adrian Conrad as Bailey
- Courtney Henggeler as Hillary
- Nev Schulman as himself
- Max Joseph as himself
- PJ Morton as himself

== Production ==
In March 2018, it was announced Tiffany Haddish, Tika Sumpter and Omari Hardwick had been cast in the film, then titled The List, with Tyler Perry writing and directing, as well as serving as a producer under his Tyler Perry Studios banner. That same month, Whoopi Goldberg, Amber Riley, and Missi Pyle also joined the cast. Later, the film was retitled Nobody's Fool.

Principal photography began in April 2018, in Atlanta, Georgia.

== Release ==
The film was released in the United States on November 2, 2018, by Paramount Pictures.

=== Home media ===
Nobody's Fool was released on Digital download by Paramount Home Entertainment on January 29, 2019, with a Blu-ray and DVD released on February 12, 2019.

=== Box office ===
Nobody's Fool grossed $31.7 million in the United States and Canada, and $1.8 million in other territories, for a total worldwide total of $33.5 million.

In the United States and Canada, Nobody's Fool was released alongside The Nutcracker and the Four Realms and Bohemian Rhapsody, and was projected to gross $12–14 million from 2,468 theaters in its opening weekend. It made $4.8 million on its first day, including $600,000 from Thursday night previews. It went on to debut to $14 million, finishing third at the box office, and ranking among the lowest opening weekends of a Perry-directed film. The film fell 53% in its second week to $6.5 million, finishing seventh.

=== Critical response ===
On Rotten Tomatoes, the film has an approval rating of 26% based on 43 reviews, with an average rating of 4.2/10. The website's critical consensus reads, "Nobody's Fool has a pair of strong leads and a smattering of scenes that highlight Tiffany Haddish's talents—all of which only make the uninspired end results more frustrating." On Metacritic, the film has a weighted average score of 39 out of 100, based on 11 critics, indicating "generally unfavorable reviews". Audiences polled by CinemaScore gave the film an average grade of "A−" on an A+ to F scale, while PostTrak reported filmgoers gave it 4 out of 5 stars.

Owen Gleiberman of Variety praised the performances of Haddish and Goldberg but wrote, "...in Nobody's Fool, Tiffany Haddish is just furious and funny enough to make you wish that the rest of the movie wasn't a droopy romantic comedy without the comedy."
