= Paranormal Activity 3 =

2011 film by Henry Joost and Ariel Schulman

- Theatrical release poster
- Directed by: Henry Joost; Ariel Schulman
- Written by: Christopher Landon
- Based on: Paranormal Activity by Oren Peli
- Produced by: Jason Blum; Oren Peli; Steven Schneider
- Starring: Lauren Bittner; Chris Smith; Chloe Csengery; Jessica Tyler Brown; Katie Featherston
- Cinematography: Magdalena Górka
- Edited by: Gregory Plotkin
- Production companies: Blumhouse Productions; Solana Films; Room 101, Inc.
- Distributed by: Paramount Pictures
- Release dates: October 14, 2011 (Festival do Rio); October 21, 2011 (United States)
- Running time: 84 minutes
- Country: United States
- Language: English
- Budget: $5 million
- Box office: $207 million

Paranormal Activity 3 is a 2011 American found footage supernatural horror film directed by Henry Joost and Ariel Schulman and written by Christopher Landon. It is the third in the Paranormal Activity film series. The film stars Lauren Bittner, Christopher Nicholas Smith, Chloe Csengery, Jessica Tyler Brown, and Katie Featherston.

The film follows young sisters Katie and Kristi as their family begins experiencing escalating paranormal activity linked to an entity known as "Tobi", prompting their mother’s boyfriend to install home video cameras that capture the disturbances and uncover connections to a wider coven.

Paranormal Activity 3 premiered at Festival do Rio on October 14, 2011, and was released in the United States by Paramount Pictures on October 21. Made on a budget of $5 million, the film was a major commercial success, grossing $207 million and setting then-record opening figures for a horror film in U.S. It received mixed reviews from critics and was followed by Paranormal Activity 4 (2012).

== Plot ==
In March 2005, Katie delivers a box of old videotapes to her pregnant sister Kristi Rey and her husband Daniel, which holds footage of young Katie and Kristi with their mother, Julie, and her boyfriend Dennis. A year later, Kristi and Daniel's house is ransacked and the tapes are missing (Note: As depicted in Paranormal Activity 2 (2010).). The VHS footage, filmed in 1988, makes up the rest of the film.

A young Katie and Kristi are living with their mother Julie and her boyfriend Dennis. Dennis notices that since Kristi's imaginary friend "Tobi" appeared, strange things have been happening around the house. Dennis and Julie attempt to film a sex tape, but an earthquake interrupts them. After reviewing the footage and noticing an invisible figure revealed by falling dust, Dennis is advised by his friend Randy to place cameras throughout the house. Dennis and Julie hire a babysitter named Lisa to watch the kids, but she becomes desperate to leave due to several terrifying incidents. The following night, Kristi tells Tobi they are not friends anymore.

Dennis discovers a strange symbol in the girls' closet and finds the same symbol in a book about demonology. When Kristi becomes mysteriously ill, Julie and Dennis take her to the hospital. When Katie is left home with Randy, they are attacked by a black figure which violently flings furniture across the room and scratches Randy on his torso. When Julie and Dennis return home, he informs her that the symbol belonged to a witches' coven that brainwashed girls of child-bearing age into having sons, then forced them to give up their sons and forget everything afterward, but Julie dismisses his claim.

The demon harms Katie until Kristi agrees to do what it asks. She asks her mother to take them to her grandmother Lois's house in Moorpark, California, and Julie agrees after encountering frightening activity herself. At 1:00 am in Moorpark, Julie and Dennis are awoken by loud disturbances and Julie goes to investigate. When she fails to return, Dennis goes to look for her. He finds occult imagery on the walls, including the symbol from the girls' room, and discovers several women, including Lois, dressed in black. He flees back to the house, with the women in pursuit, and finds Julie's limp body levitating above the ground before it is thrown at Dennis. Dennis hides with Kristi in a closet before walking into the kitchen, where Dennis, from a window, sees the women circling around a bonfire outside. Katie and Lois, in the same room as Julie's body, kill Dennis. Lois then beckons to Kristi and Katie and tells them to get ready. Before they head upstairs, Kristi calls for Tobi and growling sounds are heard upstairs until the camera cuts out and the film ends.

== Cast ==
- Chris Smith as Dennis
- Lauren Bittner as Julie
- Chloe Csengery as young Katie
  - Katie Featherston as adult Katie
- Jessica Tyler Brown as young Kristi
  - Sprague Grayden as adult Kristi
- Dustin Ingram as Randy Rosen
- Hallie Foote as Grandma Lois
- Johanna Braddy as Lisa
- Brian Boland as Daniel Rey
- Bailey Brown as Bailey

== Production ==
Principal photography began on June 6, 2011, and ended on August 5. At the time during production, the film was under the name "Sports Camp". The film was directed by Henry Joost and Ariel Schulman (who both directed the documentary Catfish). Jason Blum, Oren Peli and Steven Schneider produced, along with Akiva Goldsman serving as executive producer. With a script written by Christopher Landon, the prequel was released on October 21, 2011.

Once again using unique social media strategy after the success of the first two films, Paranormal Activity 3 created the "Tweet Your Scream" campaign on Twitter in preparation for the release and Paranormal Activity 3 Demon Summoner app.

== Reception ==
=== Box office ===
The film performed even better than its predecessors, grossing $8 million from midnight showings, setting yet another record for a horror film. Its total Friday gross was an estimated $26.2 million, which was the best opening day gross for a 2011 film since Harry Potter and the Deathly Hallows – Part 2 in July. Bringing its total to $52.6 million, it set a new record for the franchise, surpassing Paranormal Activity 2's $40.6 million. At the time of its release, it also set new opening weekend records for a film released in the month of October, as well as the fall season (later surpassed by Gravity in 2013 with a weekend gross of $55.8 million).

Paranormal Activity 3 grossed $104,028,807 in the United States and Canada, along with $101,675,011 in other countries, for a worldwide total of $205,703,818, making it the highest-grossing film in the Paranormal Activity series.

=== Critical response ===
On Rotten Tomatoes, the film has an approval rating of 67%, based on reviews from 123 critics, with an average rating of 6.1/10. The website's consensus is, "While the jolts and thrills are undeniably subject to the diminishing returns that plague most horror sequels, Paranormal Activity 3 is a surprisingly spine-tingling treat." Metacritic gives the film a weighted average score of 59 out of 100, based on reviews from 25 critics, indicating "mixed or average reviews". CinemaScore polls reported that the average grade moviegoers gave the film was a "C+" on an A+ to F scale.

Roger Ebert of the Chicago Sun-Times gave the film a single star out of four, stating that "the appeal has worn threadbare", but predicted that the film would fare well at the box office nevertheless. Kim Newman of Empire gave it 3 out of 5, writing, "If you don't expect innovation from a part three, then this won't disappoint: it may be hokey, but the scares still work."

=== Home media ===
Paranormal Activity 3 was released on DVD/Blu-ray and video on demand/pay-per-view on January 24, 2012, and includes an unrated director's cut, "lost tapes" (deleted scenes), theatrical version, and digital copy. In January 2012, the first three films in the series were edited in chronological order and released as a single film on digital platforms under the title Paranormal Activity: The Chronology. A one-disc theatrical version of the movie was released on DVD on February 14, 2012. The film grossed $3.6 million in home sales.

== Sequel ==
In January 2012, Paramount announced there would be a fourth film in the franchise. It was to be directed by Henry Joost and Ariel Schulman, the directors of the third film. Filming started in late June. The film was released on October 19, 2012. On August 1, 2012, the first trailer was released, teasing this film with the tagline, "all the activity has led to this".
