= Hooked on Love =

Hooked on Love may refer to:

== Music ==
=== Albums ===
- Hooked on Love, a 1987 album by Clarence Carter

=== Songs ===
- "Hooked on Love" (Dead or Alive song), from the album Mad, Bad and Dangerous to Know
- "Hooked on Love" (Grand Funk Railroad song), from the album Closer to Home
- "Hooked on Love", a song by Bananarama, from the album True Confessions
- "Hooked on Love", a song by Glenn Campbell, from the album Somethin' 'Bout You Baby I Like
- "Hooked on Love", a song by Schon & Hammer, from the album Untold Passion
- "Hooked on Love", a song by Benny Tipene, from the album Bricks
- "Hooked on Love", a song by Ian Gomm

== Television ==
- "Hooked on Love", a season six episode of Catfish
