= Adonis Bosso =

Ivorian-Canadian male model

- Born: 10 July 1990 (age 36); Ivory Coast
- Occupations: Model, musician
- Children: 1
- Modelling information
- Height: 188 cm (6 ft 2 in)
- Hair colour: Black
- Eye colour: Brown
- Agency: DNA Models (New York); MP Management (Paris); I Love Models Management (Milan) d1 Model Management (London); Sight Management Studio (Barcelona); IMG Models (Los Angeles); Stockholmsgruppen (Stockholm)

Adonis Bosso (born 10 July 1990) is an Ivorian-Canadian model.

== Early life ==
Bosso was born in the Ivory Coast and raised in Montreal, Quebec. He is the oldest of 6 siblings.

== Career ==
Bosso was discovered in 2009, when he accompanied a girlfriend to a modeling agency; he was signed on the spot. Bosso had intended to become a childcare worker for children with special needs.

Bosso has modeled for brands including Dolce & Gabbana, H&M, Armani Exchange, Belstaff, Gap Inc., Levi's, TOM FORD, Yeezy, Vivienne Westwood, Banana Republic, and Thom Browne. Bosso was brought to mainstream recognition by fashion executive Nick Wooster.

Bosso currently ranks as a "Money Guy" on models.com. He formerly ranked on their "Top 50 Men" list.

== Personal life ==
Bosso has a son with American model and actress Slick Woods. Bosso identifies as sexually fluid.
