= Catfishing (video game) =

2006 browser game

- Developers: Kevan Davis, Matthew
- Platform: Web browser
- Release: Web: 2006
- Genre: Trivia
- Mode: Single-player

Catfishing is an online trivia game in which players guess the names of Wikipedia articles from category tags. The game was invented by Suman Harihareswara and written by Kevan Davis. It was later re-released in 2024 by a developer identified as "Matthew".

== Gameplay ==
Every day, ten Wikipedia articles are chosen, and players attempt to guess each article's title given only certain selected categories of the article. A typical question for an article offers multiple categories, such as Bob Dylan which includes "20th century musicians", "21st century musicians", "American folk musicians", and "people born in Minnesota". After all ten questions are done, the player's score is given out of 10. Correct answers are denoted by a cat emoji, wrong answers with a fish emoji, and answers that are deemed "close enough" by the user with an egg emoji.

Categories that would give away the answer are not shown in the question. The website offers a new game of 10 questions each day. On average, players correctly guess 3.7 of them.

== Development ==
The game was invented in 2006 by Sumana Harihareswara, a programmer and project manager, and developed for the web by Kevan Davis, a British web developer and game designer. In 2024, a developer identified as "Matthew" created the current version at catfishing.net.

The original version was named "Catfishing" in 2006, "several years before the word meant anything else." The name combined "categories" with "fishing for the answer." The more common contemporary definition of catfishing—the act of deceiving someone online with a false persona—was introduced in 2010 by the American documentary film Catfish.

== Reception ==
In 2026, Catfishing was featured on NPR's Pop Culture Happy Hour. Linda Holmes, host of NPR’s Pop Culture Happy Hour, wrote that Catfishing is, "without a doubt, the hardest game I play regularly. … my average score is about four, and the highest I've ever gotten is eight."

== See also ==
- Catfishing, a form of online deception
- Wordle, an online word game
