= Kamie Crawford =

American TV host and pageant queen (born 1992)

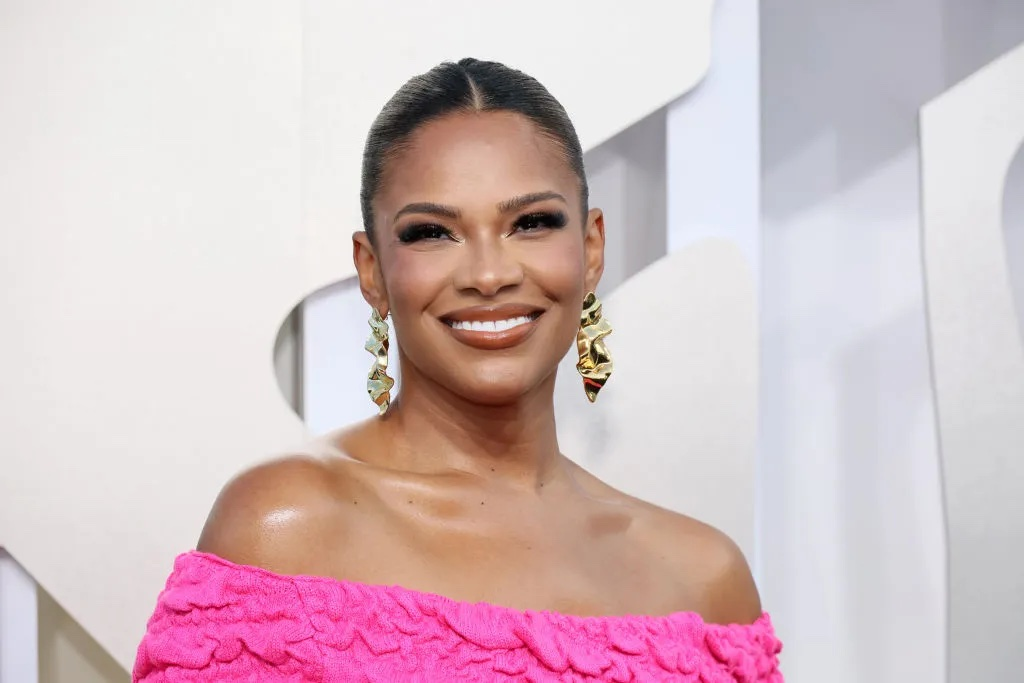
- Crawford in 2022
- Born: Kameran Crawford; October 25, 1992 (age 33); Cleveland, Ohio, U.S.
- Education: Fordham University (BA)
- Height: 5 ft 9 in (1.75 m)
- Beauty pageant titleholder
- Title: Miss Maryland Teen USA 2010; Miss Teen USA 2010
- Hair color: Brown
- Eye color: Brown
- Major competitions: Miss Teen USA 2010 (Winner)

Kameran "Kamie" Crawford Champagne (born October 25, 1992) is an American television and podcast host, Sports Illustrated Swimsuit model and former beauty queen who was crowned Miss Teen USA 2010 on July 24, 2010, at the Atlantis Paradise Island Resort in The Bahamas. Crawford was the co-host of Catfish: The TV Show until 2024. She also hosted season 9 of Are You the One? on Paramount+ and season 6 of MTV's Ex On The Beach as well as her own relationship advice podcast, Relationsh*t.

== Early life and education ==
Crawford was born on October 25, 1992, in Cleveland, Ohio. She moved to Maryland after the first grade and graduated from Winston Churchill High School in Potomac, Maryland in 2010 where she was captain of the varsity cheerleading team. Prior to winning Miss Teen USA, she was selected into the medical program for the Congressional Student Leadership Conference at Georgetown University. In September 2010, Crawford enrolled in classes at the New York Film Academy while taking some core classes at a local college. She began her freshman year of college at The University of Alabama where she was enrolled in the pre-med program, originally wanting to pursue a career in dermatology. She transferred to Fordham University and graduated in 2015 with a Bachelor of Arts degree in communications and a double concentration in television and digital media. While in college, Crawford began a career in television and hosting in the tri-state area.

== Career ==
=== Pageantry ===
Crawford won the Miss Maryland Teen USA 2010 title on November 1, 2009, competing in her first pageant. Crawford spent 5 months training for the Miss Maryland Teen USA pageant and decided to enter after a talk with her friend. "I decided to enter the Miss Maryland Teen USA pageant after a friend, who had competed two years before me, encouraged me to take part. She thought I would be successful and have fun. After winning the state pageant, the winner represents the state at the national competition, Miss Teen USA," she said. She also won the Miss Photogenic award. She had been trained by LauRen Merola, Miss Pennsylvania USA 2008.

On July 24, 2010, Crawford represented Maryland in the Miss Teen USA 2010 pageant where she made history by being the first contestant from Maryland to win the title. Crawford was the fourth Black person to win the title of Miss Teen USA after Janel Bishop in 1991, Ashley Coleman in 1999, and Marissa Whitley in 2001.

=== Modeling ===
Crawford signed with JAG Models in 2013. In 2022 she was honored as one of Sports Illustrated's Swimsuit Rookies alongside cover stars Kim Kardashian and Ciara and has been featured in the last three consecutive issues. In 2024, she was featured in Sports Illustrated's Swimsuit 60th Anniversary Issue. In addition to being highlighted in the celebratory issue, Crawford walked their iconic runway show during Miami Swim Week in 2023 and 2024 with additional brand regulars and rookies alike including Alix Earle, Brooks Nader and Lauren Chan.

=== Television Hosting ===
Throughout 2018, she served as part of a panel of rotating hosts for the second part of season 7 of the television series Catfish, along with singer Elle King, basketball player Nick Young, actress Kimiko Glenn, model Slick Woods and football player Justin Combs, after Max Joseph's departure from the series. In 2019, she became the permanent co-host of the MTV series. On October 3, 2024, she announced her departure from the show after six years.

She also hosted the reunion episode of Issa Rae's reality show Sweet Life: Los Angeles. In 2022, Crawford inked an overall deal with MTV Entertainment Studios in January and has since been named as the host of Paramount+'s Are You the One? and MTV's Ex on the Beach.

=== Podcast ===
In September 2021, Crawford launched her relationship advice podcast, “Relationsh*t with Kamie Crawford”. It has been named One of the 17 Best Podcasts for Women by Women by The Today Show. In 2024, Crawford was featured in the LA Woman issue of Los Angeles Magazine.

== Personal life ==
Crawford is the daughter of Victor and Carla Crawford and is the oldest of six girls, Milan, Victoria, Karynton, and twins, Kenadi and Kendal. In late September 2025, Crawford got engaged to her longtime partner Xavier Champagne. In August 2026, she and Champagne married.

Awards and achievements
Preceded by (Tennessee) Stormi Henley	Miss Teen USA; 2010	Succeeded by (Texas) Danielle Doty
Preceded by Kasey Staniszewski	Miss Maryland Teen USA; 2010	Succeeded by Kristen Nicholson
