= Ariel Schulman =

American filmmaker and actor (born 1981)

- Born: Marek Ariel Schulman; October 2, 1981 (age 44); New York City, U.S.
- Relatives: Nev Schulman (brother)

Marek Ariel Schulman (born October 2, 1981) is an American filmmaker and actor.

He starred in, produced, and directed the 2010 documentary Catfish, and co-directed Paranormal Activity 3 (2011), Paranormal Activity 4 (2012), Nerve (2016) and Project Power (2020) with Henry Joost.

== Career ==
Schulman has directed the movies Catfish, Paranormal Activity 3, Paranormal Activity 4, and Nerve alongside Henry Joost. He graduated from the Tisch School of the Arts' film program in 2004. Schulman and Joost founded the production company Supermarché.

In 2017, Schulman and Joost were hired to write and direct an adaptation of Mega Man for 20th Century Fox. In 2019, following Disney's acquisition of 21st Century Fox's assets, the film along with numerous video game based movies in development at Fox were cancelled. However, this turned out to be untrue, with Capcom confirming that the film was still in development. In 2020, it was revealed that Mattson Tomlin had been hired to help co-write the screenplay.

In 2018, Schulman co-directed the Netflix sci-fi superhero thriller film Project Power alongside Joost from a screenplay by Mattson Tomlin.

== Personal life ==
His younger brother is Nev Schulman, the host of MTV's Catfish: The TV Show and the subject of his premiere documentary, Catfish. They are both of German-Jewish, Russian-Jewish, Polish-Jewish, and Romanian-Jewish descent.

== Filmography (with Henry Joost) ==
Film

Year	Title	Director	Writer
2011	Paranormal Activity 3	Yes	No
2012	Paranormal Activity 4	Yes	No
2016	Nerve	Yes	No
2016	Viral	Yes	No
2020	Project Power	Yes	No
2022	Secret Headquarters	Yes	Yes
TBA	Untitled Weezer film	Yes	Yes

Documentary film

Year	Title	Director	Producer	DoP	Himself	Notes
2010	Catfish	Yes	Yes	Yes	Yes	
2011	Metropolis II	Yes	Yes	Yes	No	Documentary short
2012	A Brief History of John Baldessari	Yes	Yes	No	No	Documentary short
2021	Unknown Dimension: The Story of Paranormal Activity	No	No	No	Yes	

Television

Year	Title	Director	Writer	Executive Producer	Notes
2011	3x3	Yes	No	No	TV movie
2012–2016	Catfish: The TV Show	No	Yes	Yes	

== Acting roles ==
Year	Title	Role	Notes
2005	The Adventures of Slaters's Friend	Slater	Short
2006	If You See Something, Say Something	Commuter	Short
2007	Jerry Ruis, Shall We Do This?	Jerry Ruis	Short
2007	Tight Shots		TV series
2008	The Pleasure of Being Robbed	Boyfriend	
2009	Family Tree		Short
2024	Queer	Tom Weston	
