= Nev Schulman =

American television host and producer (born 1984)

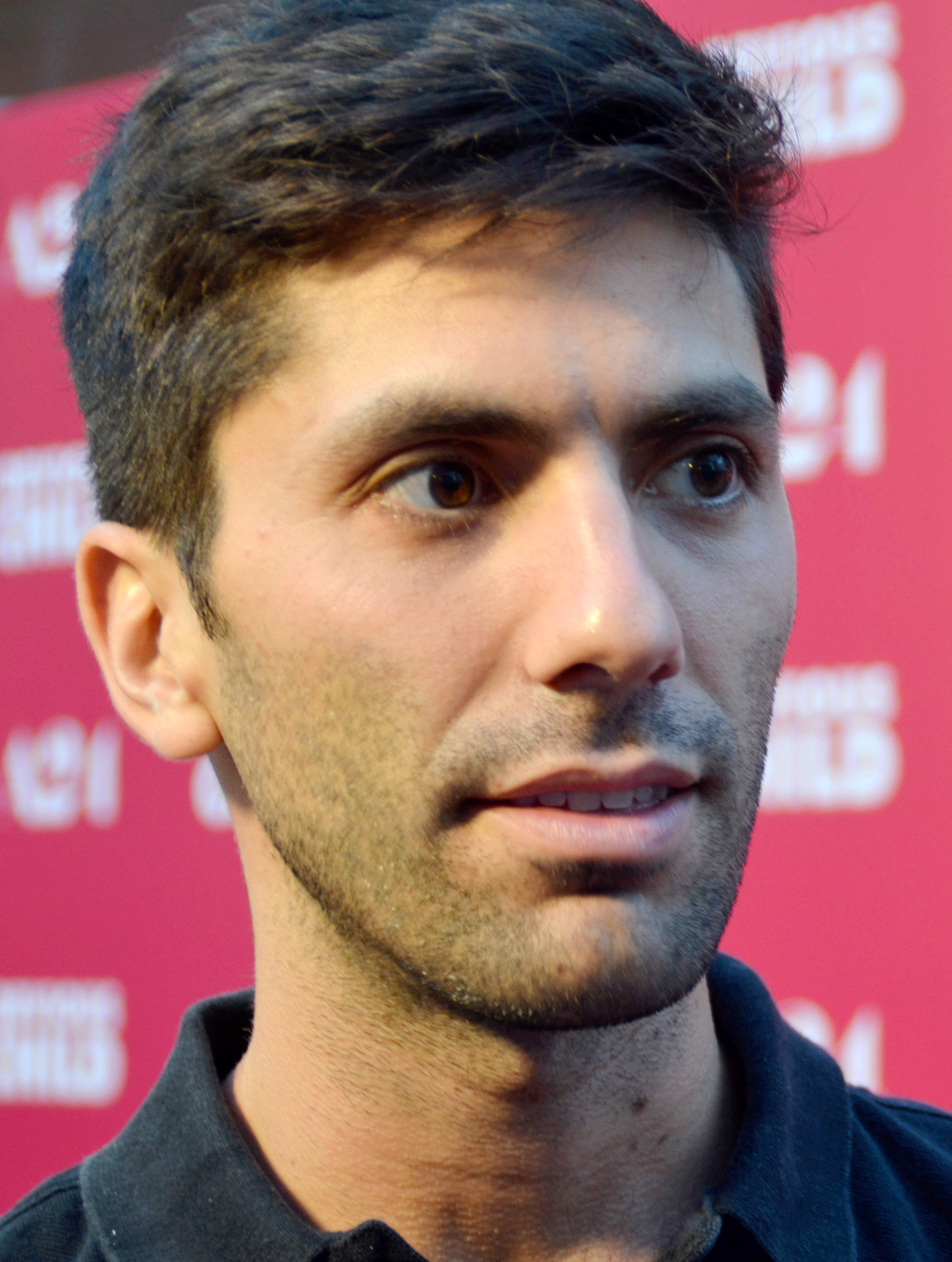
- Schulman at the Obvious Child premiere in June 2014
- Born: September 26, 1984 (age 42); New York City, U.S.
- Occupations: Producer, photographer, TV host
- Known for: Catfish
- Spouse: Laura Perlongo (m. 2017)
- Children: 3
- Relatives: Ariel Schulman (brother)
- Website: nevschulman.com

Yaniv "Nev" Schulman (/ˈniːv/ NEEV; born September 26, 1984) is an American TV host and producer. He is best known for the 2010 documentary film Catfish and the follow-up TV series Catfish: The TV Show on MTV of which he is the host and executive producer.

== Early life ==
Schulman was born in New York City to a Jewish family. He has an older brother, Ariel Schulman, who is an actor and filmmaker.

Schulman started taking pictures and became involved with photography after having studied dance for five years. He attended Sarah Lawrence College, studying photography and dance from 2004 to 2006. Schulman admitted that he was expelled from Sarah Lawrence College after punching a female student whom he allegedly mistook for male.

== Career ==
At age 19, he and his brother Ariel started a film and photography production company. In 2004, Schulman started photographing dance as he became involved with the contemporary ballet community in New York City. He is a founding member of the Young Leadership Committee for the youth organization, Leave Out Violence.

In 2010, Schulman became the subject of the documentary Catfish, filmed by Ariel and business partner Henry Joost, in which Schulman met and fell in love with a woman he met online. The premise followed Schulman on the journey of falling in love with a woman he meets on the Internet, but later finds out that she may not be exactly who she claimed to be.

In 2012, Schulman became the host and executive producer of the follow-up show Catfish: The TV Show for MTV, with his filmmaking partner Max Joseph, where he introduces couples in real life who have fallen for each other online but have yet to meet. In 2018, production was suspended following an accusation of sexual misconduct. Soon after, upon an investigation, the report of sexual misconduct was found to be "not credible" and the suspension was lifted.

Schulman has written a book, In Real Life: Love, Lies & Identity in the Digital Age (2014). In it, he gives both personal history and observations gleaned from his work on Catfish.

He appeared in the 2018 film Nobody's Fool playing himself together with Max.

On September 2, 2020, Schulman was announced as one of the celebrities competing on the 29th season of Dancing with the Stars. Schulman and his partner Jenna Johnson came in second place to season 29 winner Kaitlyn Bristowe and her partner Artem Chigvintsev. On August 31, 2026, Schulman was part of Dancing with the Stars: The Next Pro, paired with season one winner Adele Zaikman.

== Personal life ==
Schulman met Laura Perlongo via Instagram when he messaged her inviting her for a date on his motorcycle. They dated briefly before he ended things but they soon got back together. It was during this time that Laura got pregnant "accidentally on purpose" with the couple's first child, as she had written in an article published during her pregnancy. Schulman and Perlongo became engaged on May 26, 2016. Perlongo gave birth to their daughter, Cleo James, on October 21, 2016. On July 22, 2017, Schulman and Perlongo married. On January 9, 2019, Perlongo gave birth to the couple's second child, Beau Bobby Bruce. On September 25, 2021, she gave birth to the couple's third child, Cy Monroe.
