= We Are Your Friends (film) =

2015 American music drama film directed by Max Joseph

- Theatrical release poster
- Directed by: Max Joseph
- Screenplay by: Max Joseph; Meaghan Oppenheimer
- Story by: Richard Silverman
- Produced by: Tim Bevan; Eric Fellner; Liza Chasin
- Starring: Zac Efron; Emily Ratajkowski; Shiloh Fernandez; Alex Shaffer; Jonny Weston; Wes Bentley
- Cinematography: Brett Pawlak
- Edited by: Terel Gibson; David Diliberto
- Music by: Stewart Copeland
- Production companies: Anton Capital Entertainment; Working Title Films
- Distributed by: Warner Bros. Pictures (United States); StudioCanal (International)
- Release dates: August 11, 2015 (London); August 28, 2015 (United States)
- Running time: 96 minutes
- Countries: United States; United Kingdom
- Language: English
- Budget: $2 million
- Box office: $11.1 million

We Are Your Friends is a 2015 drama film directed by Max Joseph (in his feature directorial debut). The screenplay, written by Meaghan Oppenheimer and Joseph, was adapted from a story by Richard Silverman. The film stars Zac Efron, Emily Ratajkowski, and Wes Bentley, and follows a young Los Angeles DJ trying to make it in the music industry and figure out life with his friends.

The film was released in the United States by Warner Bros. Pictures on August 28, 2015. Its financier, StudioCanal, distributed it internationally, including France, the United Kingdom, Germany, the Netherlands, Australia, and New Zealand. The film received mixed reviews and grossed $11 million.

== Plot ==
Cole Carter, a San Fernando Valley native, former track star, college dropout, and struggling 23-year-old DJ in the electronic dance music (EDM) scene, dreams of becoming a major record producer. Cole's friends Mason (an aspiring club runner), Ollie (an aspiring actor), and Squirrel (gifted with math) partner up to canvas for a nightclub. With Mason's help, Cole was able to perform that night, where he meets the headliner, a once-innovative DJ, James Reed. James invites Cole to a party, where Cole hallucinates because a spliff they shared contained Phencyclidine (PCP). The morning after, Cole wakes up at James' lavish home, where he is introduced to Sophie, James' girlfriend and personal assistant, who drives him home. Unhappy with their earnings from canvassing, Cole and his friends seek employment with Paige Morrell, who manages a real estate solutions firm, providing promising income.

Later, James employs Cole to DJ for a house party and is impressed by his performance. Mason, Ollie, and Squirrel show up and after a party-goer insults Mason; a physical dispute takes place. The group is forcefully escorted out of the gathering. However, James sees the potential in Cole and takes him as his student; focusing on organic originality, increasing the number of performances and earnings. One night, Cole was invited to escort Sophie to her college soirée – where it was revealed that Sophie dropped out due to humiliation after being sexually exploited. Cole defends her and Sophie expressed her and James’ appreciation for his demeanor and artistry. One weekend, Cole and his friends head to Las Vegas for an electronic music festival, where he meets up with Sophie, whom James ditched. Sophie gives Cole MDMA – both leave the festival for the Las Vegas Strip in which a one-night stand ensues. Back in Los Angeles, James provides Cole with new equipment and presented the opportunity to open for him at an upcoming music festival in Downtown Los Angeles called ‘SummerFest’. Cole graciously accepts the offer. One day, Cole and Paige meet up with Tanya Romero, whose house is in the process of being foreclosed. During the negotiation, Paige buys her house and rents it back to her, intending to sell it quickly at a higher price, which angers Cole. Despite a brief confrontation, Paige substantially pays Cole for his assistance in the acquisition. Amidst relationship problems, James finds out about Cole and Sophie's relationship – forcing him to cut ties with them.

Returning to his three friends, it is revealed that Squirrel had been looking for better job opportunities, wanting to expand his horizons outside of the San Fernando Valley. Using his earnings, Mason enthusiastically reveals to Cole, Ollie, and Squirrel that he rented out a house intending for them to live and grow in their respective paths. Following an intense night of partying with alcohol, drugs, and music; Squirrel is found unconscious the next morning, eventually passing from an overdose. After the funeral, the remaining friends begin to question their future. Ollie comes to a realization that they are unable to actualize their goals. The confrontation briefly turns violent as Mason blames Ollie for the drugs that killed Squirrel, causing Ollie to leave the group. Cole visits James, whose alcoholism has completely consumed him, to let him know of Squirrel's death and that it could possibly have been his fault. James consoles him and mentions that Sophie moved to the San Fernando Valley and works at a local coffee shop, where he later visits.

During a run, Cole begins to notice the natural sounds of his surroundings, which inspires him to record samples and integrate them into his long-awaited track. Cole tells James that he is ready and has something for SummerFest – James gives him another chance. The festival is set outside the American Apparel building in Los Angeles. Cole plays his track, which contains soundbites of conversations with Sophie and Squirrel. When the song ends, Cole is met with enthusiastic acclaim from the audience and James. The film concludes with a montage of the characters venturing out into their respective paths of life: Ollie prepares for an audition, Mason running operations at the nightclub, and Cole remains positive about his future and creating a proper relationship with Sophie, who returned to school.

In the mid-credits scene, Tanya opens her front door to an Adidas shoebox that Cole has been saving his earnings in throughout the film.

== Cast ==
- Zac Efron as Cole Carter
- Emily Ratajkowski as Sophie
- Shiloh Fernandez as Ollie
- Alex Shaffer as "Squirrel"
- Jonny Weston as Dustin Mason
- Wes Bentley as James Reed
- Joey Rudman as Joey
- Jon Bernthal as Paige Morrell
- Vanessa Lengies as Mel
- Brittany Furlan as Sara
- Jon Abrahams as A Club Promoter
- Alicia Coppola as Tanya Romero
- Korrina Rico as Crystal
- Nicky Romero as Himself (Cameo)
- Dillon Francis as Himself
- Alesso as Himself
- DallasK as Himself
- Them Jeans as Himself
- Zach Firtel as DJ Sweet Baby Ray's
- Andy Ward as DJ Xochil
- Hayden Fein as DJ DK
- Jacob Epstein as DJ Bald Dad
- King Bach as Himself (cameo)

== Production ==
=== Development ===
On June 6, 2014, Efron entered negotiations to star in an untitled film about a DJ, which was set to be directed by Max Joseph. The film is Joseph's debut. On July 31, 2014, Ratajkowski joined the cast of the film, which by then had been given the title We Are Your Friends, and had a start date of August 18 announced for principal photography. The name came from the 2006 Justice vs. Simian song "We Are Your Friends". Jon Abrahams joined the cast on August 5, Alicia Coppola on August 14, and Wes Bentley on August 18. By that point, Jonny Weston, Shiloh Fernandez, and Alex Shaffer had also signed on to star. In late September, the film cast background actors.

=== Filming ===
Principal photography began on August 18, 2014, in the San Fernando Valley. Joseph co-wrote the adapted screenplay with Meaghan Oppenheimer, based on a Richard Silverman story. Working Title Films partners Tim Bevan and Eric Fellner co-produced the film, which was financed by StudioCanal. Silverman was an executive producer. StudioCanal is the worldwide distributor. The promotional tour for the film included stops in London, Paris, and six cities in North America (Toronto, Miami, New York, Chicago, Los Angeles, and San Francisco).

=== Animation ===
A critically noted scene in the film involves animation depicting Cole's PCP hallucinations at a swanky LA art gallery. Rotoscoping was used to achieve this effect.

== Release ==
In November 2014, Warner Bros. Pictures acquired the film's North American distribution rights. Two weeks later, StudioCanal announced that international distribution had been sold in several markets. On April 28, 2015, Warner Bros. set the film for an August 28, 2015 release. The film was only released on DVD on November 17, 2015, in North America. The Blu-ray was only released in region B (UK, Europe, Oceania, Middle East, Africa) on December 17, 2015.

== Reception ==
=== Box office ===
We Are Your Friends grossed $3.6 million in North America and $7.5 million in other territories for a total gross of $11.1 million.

It made $1.8 million in its opening weekend, finishing 14th at the box office. Box Office Mojo reports with a 2,333 theater count, the film grossed an average $758 from each venue, making it the fourth worst debut for a film with a 2,000+ theater average. It was surpassed later in the year by Rock the Kasbah ($731 average) and Jem and the Holograms ($570), both of which opened on October 23, 2015.

=== Critical response ===
On the review aggregator website Rotten Tomatoes, 40% of 135 critics' reviews are positive. The website's consensus reads: "We Are Your Friends boasts magnetic stars and glimmers of insight, but they're lost in a clichéd coming-of-age story as programmed as the soundtrack's beats." Metacritic, which uses a weighted average, assigned the film a score of 46 out of 100, based on 32 critics, indicating "mixed or average" reviews. Audiences polled by CinemaScore gave the film a grade of "C+" on an A+ to F scale.

The Hollywood Reporter named Efron's performance as Cole Carter their 2nd-favorite film performance of 2015, behind only Christopher Abbott as the title character of James White. The magazine stated, "And while the picture's box-office returns didn't exactly pump up the volume, this 28-year-old Tyrone Power clone increasingly ranks among the most exciting American actors of his generation." Bilge Ebiri of Vulture.com noted that Ratajkowski's role takes a back seat to the love triangle's central Efron/Bentley relationship.

The movie is the subject of the third season of the podcast The Worst Idea of All Time, in which two New Zealand comedians watch the same movie every week for a whole year, and discuss it each week.

== See also ==
- XOXO (2016), a film with a similar premise
