= Henry Joost =

American film director

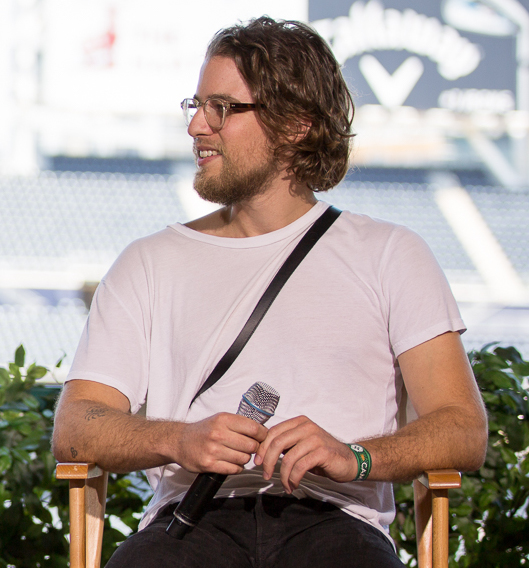
- Joost at the 2016 San Diego Comic-Con
- Born: October 30, 1982 (age 43); Frankfurt, Germany
- Occupation: Filmmaker
- Spouse: Sofia Black-D'Elia (m. 2021)
- Children: 1

Henry Joost (born October 30, 1982) is an American filmmaker, whose work includes directing, with Ariel Schulman, the films Catfish, Paranormal Activity 3, Paranormal Activity 4, Nerve and Project Power. Henry is married to actress Sofia Black-D'Elia.

== Career ==
Joost briefly attended Columbia University. In 2006, he became a finalist in the Scion Xpress Fest, a film school competition, where he directed a music video for an indie band Palomar. In 2018, Joost co-directed the Netflix sci-fi superhero thriller film Project Power alongside Ariel Schulman from a screenplay by Mattson Tomlin. The film stars Jamie Foxx, Joseph Gordon-Levitt and Dominique Fishback. It was released on August 14, 2020.

== Filmography (with Ariel Schulman) ==
Film

- Paranormal Activity 3 (2011)
- Paranormal Activity 4 (2012)
- Nerve (2016)
- Viral (2016)
- Project Power (2020)
- Secret Headquarters (2022) (Also writer)

Documentary film

Year	Title	Director	Producer	DoP	Himself	Notes
2010	Catfish	Yes	Yes	Yes	Yes	
2011	Metropolis II	Yes	Yes	Yes	No	Documentary short
2012	A Brief History of John Baldessari	Yes	Yes	Yes	No	Documentary short
2021	Unknown Dimension: The Story of Paranormal Activity	No	No	No	Yes	

Television

Year	Title	Director	Writer	Executive Producer	Notes
2011	3x3	Yes	No	No	TV movie
2012–2024	Catfish: The TV Show	No	Yes	Yes	
