= Nick Wooster =

American fashion consultant (born 1960)

Nickelson Wooster
- Born: July 2, 1960 (age 66); Salina, Kansas, United States
- Education: University of Kansas
- Occupations: Model, Fashion consultant, free agent and internet personality
- Height: 1.68 m (5 ft 6 in)

Nickelson Wooster (born July 2, 1960) is an American fashion consultant who has worked with Barneys New York, Bergdorf Goodman and Neiman Marcus chain stores, as well as Calvin Klein, Polo Ralph Lauren and Thom Browne. He is best known for his street style.

== Biography ==
Nick Wooster (Nickelson Wooster) was born in Salina, Kansas on July 2, 1960. At a very young age he was into fashion and never wanted to wear the same thing twice. When he went into middle school and high school, he noticed the richer kids had nicer clothes, and he constantly told his mom "I want that." And his mom said, "Great. Then go get a job and make money and buy that, because we're not buying it for you."

Nick Wooster was born in a middle-class family. At 16, he began working at a local clothing store Joseph P. Roth and Sons. He entered the University of Kansas in 1978, where he studied journalism and advertising. After graduation in 1982, Wooster moved to New York City, where he took a job at advertising agency. In 1985 he started selling advertising space at New York Magazine. He got fired, because the company found out his drug addiction. Saatchi & Saatchi. Later he became an assistant department manager for the Saks Fifth Avenue store chain, and in 1984-1985 he worked as account executive at New York Magazine.

From 1987 to 1993, Wooster was a buyer, first for Barneys New York store chain, and then for Bergdorf Goodman chain. On September 3, 1995 Wooster became sober completely. In 1993-1995 he worked as director of retail merchandising at the Calvin Klein fashion house, and in 1995-1996 as the design director of the Polo Ralph Lauren brand. In 1996 he became president of the American brand John Bartlett. Wooster left John Bartlett in 2001 and founded own agency, Wooster Consultancy. In the fall of 2001, Wooster struggled financially and did anything he could to stay afloat. Wooster moved to Miami, working in a car dealership before moving to Los Angeles, having a couple of false starts, working on the floor of Barneys in Beverly Hills, and then, eventually, working for two companies for a few years. In 2005 he became general merchandising manager for the brand Rozae Nichols, and in 2007 he moved to the position of creative services director of the Splendid/Ella Moss brand.

Later, in the fall of 2009, Tommy Fazio had left the men's fashion director job at Neiman Marcus and Bergdorf Goodman. In 2010, Wooster became men's fashion director at the Neiman Marcus store chain, but was fired in year and a half after a very frank interview with GQ. In 2010–2012, he was a consultant for the Thom Browne brand and for online clothing store Gilt Groupe. In 2012–2013, he served as senior vice president of JCPenney retail chain.

== Personal life ==
Wooster does not drink but he says he is addicted to coffee. His daily routine involves waking up at five in the morning and follows a strict diet preferring food cooked in olive oil. He exercises regularly to maintain his physique and cycling and cardio being his favorite exercise.

== Clothing collections ==
In 2012, Wooster designed a collection of shirts for the American brand Hamilton 1883. In 2014–2015, he created two joint collections with Japanese brand United Arrows. Also in 2014, Wooster designed a collection with the Italian house Lardini, presented at the men's fashion exhibition Pitti Uomo in Florence. In 2015, he designed a capsule collection of clothes from merino wool in cooperation with the Swedish brand The White Briefs, also presented at Pitti Uomo.

== Personal style ==
Wooster is known for tailored blazers, handlebar mustache and tattoo sleeves. He got his first tattoo in 1994; about five years later, he had a three-quarter sleeve done on his left arm. Upon completion of his left arm he had a sleeve done on his right arm. He also has one tattoo on his right leg. He is also known particularly for his silver hair sporting a pompadour.
