= Slick Woods =

American model

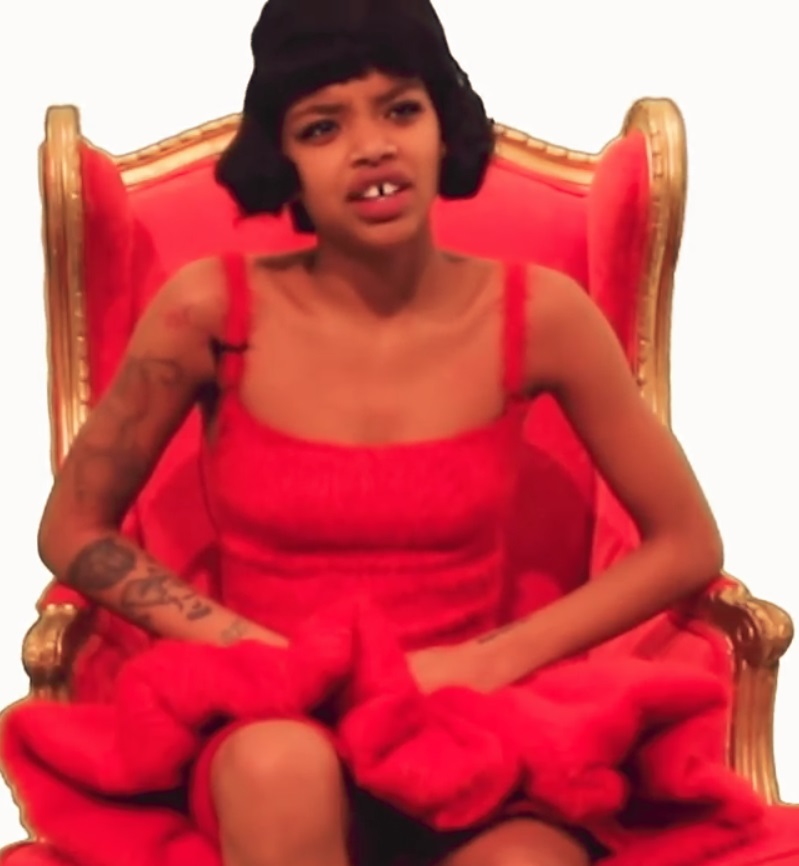
- Slick Woods for Love magazine in 2017
- Born: Simone Thompson; August 13, 1996 (age 30); Minneapolis, Minnesota, U.S.
- Partner: Micky Munday (2018–2019)
- Children: 1
- Modeling information
- Height: 1.77 m (5 ft 9 1/2 in)
- Hair color: Dark brown
- Eye color: Brown
- Agency: CAA (New York, Los Angeles)

Simone Marie Thompson (born August 13, 1996), better known as Slick Woods, is an American fashion model, known for her bald head, gapped teeth, and tattoos. Woods is a part of the "Social Media Modeling" or "Instagirl" movement as she has followers in the six-figure range.

Kanye West is credited with helping to launch Woods's career. She has most notably modeled for Rihanna and Marc Jacobs. She has appeared in several international editions of Vogue and a campaign for Calvin Klein. She was featured in the 2018 Pirelli calendar alongside celebrities such as Naomi Campbell, Lupita Nyong'o, and Diddy. As of February 2018, Woods is ranked on the Top 50 Models list on models.com.

== Early life ==
Simone Thompson was raised in Los Angeles, California. "Slick Woods" is a nickname given to her by her friends. She was raised by her grandmother, as her mother was incarcerated when Woods was four years old. Her mother was released in February 2019.

== Career ==
Woods was discovered by model Ash Stymest. She has done campaigns for Moschino and Calvin Klein. She has appeared in runway shows for Fenty x Puma, Yeezy, Fendi, Marc Jacobs, Miu Miu and Jeremy Scott. In magazines, she has been in American Vogue, Vogue Italia, Vogue Japan, Glamour, i-D, Jalouse, Porter, Dazed, V and Love. In commercial work she has modeled for Urban Outfitters.

In September 2017, Woods was revealed to be one of the faces of Rihanna's makeup brand, Fenty Beauty.

She appeared in the 2020 film Goldie, in which she was praised for "a stunning debut performance". For the leading role, Woods was introduced to director Sam de Jong at a strip club by casting director Damian Bao, who street scouted her in 2016.

Woods appeared on the sixth season of Love & Hip Hop: Hollywood.

== Personal life ==
Woods is an avid marijuana smoker and has been rejected from some brands because of it.

She has a son with model Adonis Bosso. She gave birth to her son in September 2018, shortly after appearing in Rihanna's SavagexFenty fashion show.

Woods mentioned while co-hosting an episode of Catfish: The TV Show that she had once been homeless for 12 years.

In November 2019, Woods stated that she was undergoing chemotherapy for stage 3 melanoma, but did not want to be treated "like a victim".

Woods is bisexual.
