= Catfish: The TV Show =

American reality-based documentary television series

- Genre: Reality
- Based on: Catfish by Henry Joost and Ariel Schulman
- Developed by: Ariel Schulman; Nev Schulman; Max Joseph
- Presented by: Nev Schulman; Max Joseph; Kamie Crawford
- Country of origin: United States
- Original language: English
- No. of seasons: 9
- No. of episodes: 242 (list of episodes)

Production
- Executive producers: Andrew Jarecki; Ariel Schulman; Eddie Schmidt; Eric Rosenbaum; Kim Rosenbaum; Brad Bishop; David Metzler; Henry Joost; Jonathan Karshis; Julie Link Steffens; Marc Smerling; Marshall Eisen; Nev Schulman; Guillermo Bonilla; Nomi Ernst Leidner; Tom Forman; John Maroney; Greg Nash
- Cinematography: John DeTarsio; Max Joseph
- Camera setup: Multiple; Webcam
- Running time: 41 to 42 minutes
- Production companies: Catfish Picture Company; Relativity Media; Critical Content; MTV Entertainment Studios

Original release
- Network: MTV
- Release: November 12, 2012 – July 16, 2024

Related
- Ghosted: Love Gone Missing; Help! I'm in a Secret Relationship!

Catfish: The TV Show (often shortened to Catfish) is an American reality-based documentary television series airing on MTV about the truths and lies of online dating. The series, which premiered on November 12, 2012, is based on the 2010 film Catfish. On September 22, 2025, it was announced that the series had been cancelled after nine seasons.

== Premise ==
The show presents the "hopeful" as the one who initiates contact in an attempt to discover the true identity of their online romance, or "catfish". Some of the show's casting calls solicit stories from hopefuls. Casting director Michael Esposito has said that the show has received more than 100 applications a day.

They used to tank cod from Alaska all the way to China. They'd keep them in vats in the ship. By the time the codfish reached China, the flesh was mush and tasteless. So this guy came up with the idea that if you put these cods in these big vats, put some catfish in with them and the catfish will keep the cod agile. And there are those people who are catfish in life. And they keep you on your toes. They keep you guessing, they keep you thinking, they keep you fresh. And I thank God for the catfish because we would be ... boring and dull if we didn't have somebody nipping at our fin.

— Nev Schulman (Catfish, the film)

The term "catfish" originated as the title of a 2010 documentary in which filmmaker Schulman discovers that the woman with whom he'd been having an online relationship had not been honest in describing herself. The term has since come to be used to refer to someone who creates a fake personal profile on social sites using someone else's pictures and false biographical information to pretend to be someone else, usually intending to trick someone into falling in love with them.

In each episode, Schulman and his co-host, first receive a request by someone who is emotionally entangled with someone they have never met in real life. Then they usually travel to the person's residence and do online research to try to uncover the truth about whether the other participant in the virtual relationship is legitimate or a "catfish", and make them meet either way. During the COVID-19 pandemic, the show was filmed online and instead of an in-person meeting, participants met through Zoom. Some of these couples have been communicating for a few months—others, for years. Schulman has said that the show is not all about pulling the rug out from under people, explaining:

Whether or not two people are totally lying to each other and it turns out to be a huge disaster, that's only the first part of the story. We then want to know why they are doing it, who they are, what they are feeling, what led them to this place, and why that resonates with thousands of other young people who have the same feelings, who don't have someone to talk to or don't know how to express themselves.

— Nev Schulman, August 2012 Zap2It article

As explained in 2014 reports on Hollywood.com and Vulture, it is usually the catfish who makes the first contact with MTV. Producers then proceed to gather information about the deception from the catfish and contact the hopeful afterwards. For legal reasons, everyone involved in the series signs a contract agreeing to appear on camera before the episode enters production. In Season 3's Miranda and Camryn episode, the catfish changed their mind about meeting the hopeful, and appeared only by Skype.

The hosts are given no information about the catfish. In 2023, Kamie Crawford told Popculture

I think people have this misconception that Nev and I are in on something before we go into filming. We have no idea what is happening ever. We literally open the laptop and read the email, and that's our first time hearing about anyone or knowing anything.

Nev Schulman has explained that while the catfish has agreed to appear on the show, they do not know when or how the hosts will be looking for them.

A lot of the stories that we get come from the catfish side of things. People who feel so terrible [...] that they've been lying to a friend or a lover on the internet for a long time. They want to come clean, but they fear if they simply told the truth, the other person would [...] be very upset that they've been lied to and deceived, and likely discard them. And so they're hopeful that by coming on the show [...] maybe we can facilitate some kind of amicable exchange, that they can be heard, explain themselves in a more objective and non-judgmental way. So [the producers] orchestrate very delicately, and staying out of it as much as possible, a scenario by which [...] the hopeful reaches out to me [...]. And so [the hosts] just pick up from there. [The hopeful has] no idea of course that the other person's already expressed interest in meeting. And the [catfish] doesn't know that we're actually doing it. They just sorta think maybe it could happen. So they don't know when or why or how. So it's tricky, but everything is real. The feelings are real, the relationships are real. We haven't created any scenarios, we don't tell people what to say or do. It's very unpredictable.

== Presenters ==
In its first seven seasons, the show was hosted by Nev Schulman and Max Joseph. Seeking to pursue a directing career, Joseph left the series and his last episode aired on August 22, 2018. For the remaining episodes of the seventh season that aired in 2019, he was replaced by alternate presenters, including singer Elle King, model Selita Ebanks, basketball player Nick Young, actress Kimiko Glenn, model Slick Woods, actress Tallulah Willis, rapper Machine Gun Kelly, and presenter Kamie Crawford. Eventually, Crawford was selected to officially become part of the hosting duo in the show's eighth season alongside Schulman.

== Production ==
In May 2018, filming of season seven was suspended due to sexual misconduct allegations against Schulman. The suspension was lifted after the allegations were found to be "not credible".

In early January 2024, the show was renewed for its ninth season by MTV, which premiered on April 30, 2024. It was announced that Joseph would return this season to host an episode. In September 2025, MTV canceled the series after nine seasons.

== Series overview ==
Season	Episodes	Originally released	
Season	Episodes	First released	Last released
1	12	November 12, 2012	February 25, 2013
2	16	June 25, 2013	October 15, 2013
3	10	May 7, 2014	July 9, 2014
4	19	February 25, 2015	August 30, 2015
5	20	February 24, 2016	September 21, 2016
6	20	March 1, 2017	August 30, 2017
7	40	January 3, 2018	August 29, 2019
8	99	January 8, 2020	May 14, 2024
9	11	April 30, 2024	July 16, 2024

=== Spin-offs ===
There have been two Catfish spin-offs. The first, Catfish: Trolls, was hosted by media personality Charlamagne tha God and featured online personalities confronting trolls who had been harassing them online. It aired for three-episodes in 2018. The second spinoff, Ghosted: Love Gone Missing, is hosted by The Bachelorette Rachel Lindsay and celebrity rapper Travis Mills and features stories about people trying to find former friends or romantic partners after having been ghosted.

=== Podcast ===
In 2020, MTV and Wondery began releasing episodes as podcasts under the title Catfish: The Podcast, with the first episode released on November 26, 2020.

== Reception ==
The film Catfish was criticized and its authenticity questioned. Executive producer Tom Forman stressed that the TV version wouldn't just tell "stories of deception. We've also stumbled into some love stories. We found people who are exactly who they say they are. We are putting those on television, too. We find people who are willing to get past an initial deception and really do make a connection at the end—in person and in real life. That's been really heartwarming. So, I think, when we set out, we really don't know how it's going to end: good, bad, or in the middle somewhere".

== International versions ==
Country	Name	Host(s)	Channel	No. of seasons	Broadcast
Colombia	Catfish Colombia	Diego Saenz, Sebastián Parra	MTV	2	September 10, 2014 – November 5, 2015
Chile	Espías del Amor	Julio César Rodríguez (1–3), Andrés Alemparte (1–3), César Antonio Campos (3), Marcelo Arismendi (1–2)	Chilevisión	3	October 27, 2015 – Not renewed
Brazil	Catfish Brasil	Ciro Sales, Ricardo Gadelha	MTV	3	August 31, 2016 – October 10, 2018
Mexico	Catfish Mexico	Chapu Garza, José Luis Badalt	MTV	1	March 1, 2018 – Not renewed
United Kingdom	Catfish UK	Julie Adenuga (1), Oobah Butler (1-3), Nella Rose (2-3)	MTV	3	April 21, 2021 – March 8, 2023

In January 2016, MTV began casting a proposed British version of the show through online ads that specifically targeted the catfish, not the hopeful: "Tired of keeping secrets from your online love? Come clean" and "Are you a secret Catfish? It's time to come clean". The project was cancelled, but Schulman has said he would like to make a pan-European version.

In August 2019, Network 10 chose to cancel its Australian version of Catfish, which was going to be hosted by Casey Donovan.

In January 2024, Catfish UK host Oobah Butler announced that the show was not renewed for a fourth season.

== See also ==
- Catfish effect
