= Max Joseph =

American filmmaker and television host

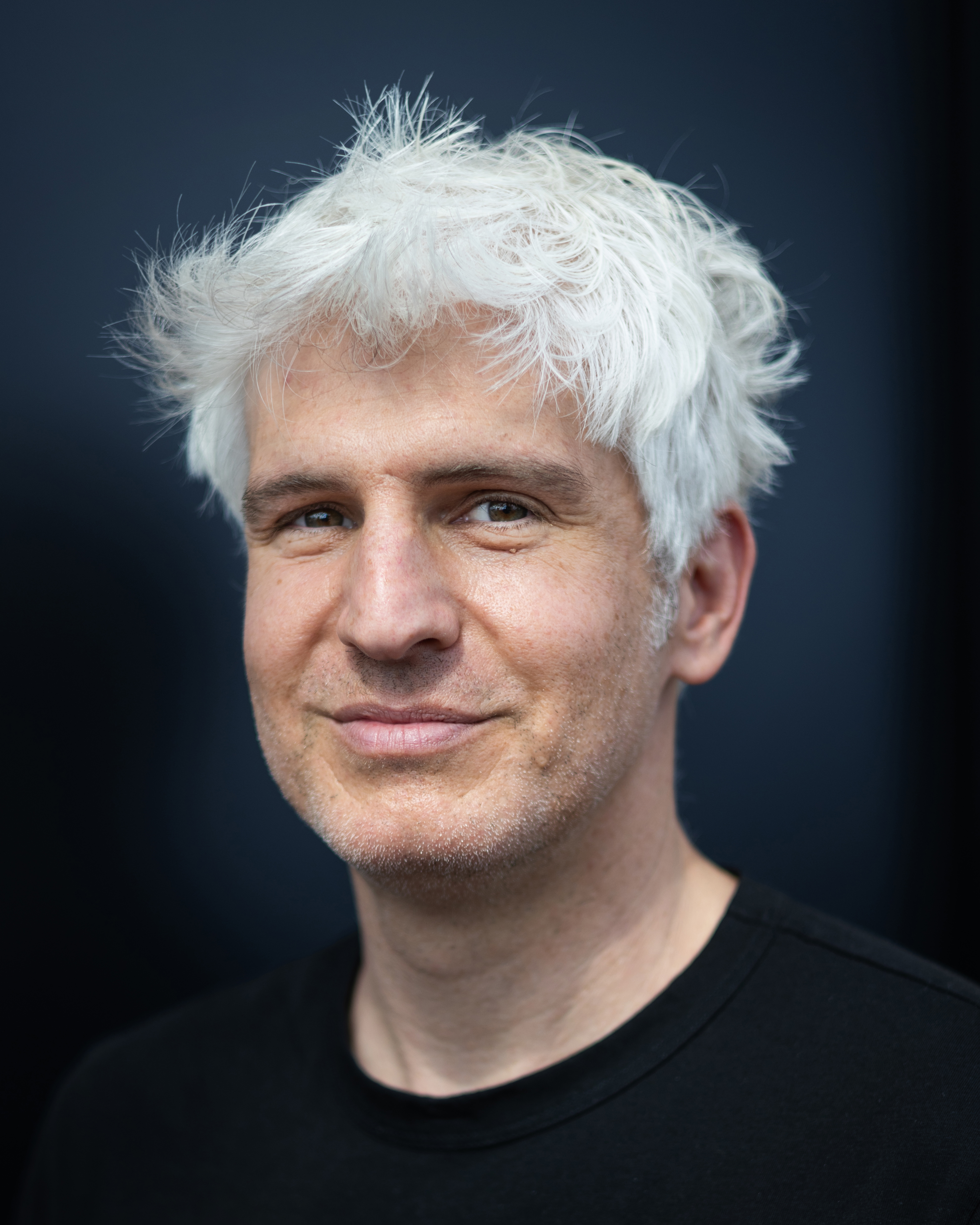
- Born: H. Maxwell Joseph; January 16, 1982 (age 44); New York City, U.S.
- Education: Brown University (BA)
- Occupations: Filmmaker, television host
- Television: Catfish: The TV Show
- Spouse: Priscila Joseph (m. 2012)

H. Maxwell Joseph (born January 16, 1982) is an American filmmaker and a television host.

For seven seasons, he was a host and cameraman for Catfish: The TV Show. He was absent from Catfish for several episodes in the fourth season to make his feature film debut, We Are Your Friends, starring Zac Efron. Joseph announced that he was leaving Catfish: The TV Show in 2018, and in 2020 he was replaced by Kamie Crawford.

Joseph has directed several films, including 12 Years of DFA: Too Old to Be New, Too New to Be Classic, Garden of Eden, and several other productions.

In 2024, it was announced that Joseph would return to host an episode in the ninth season of Catfish: The TV Show.

== Filmography ==
Films directed
Year	Film	Type	Notes
2008	State of the Economy: Oil Addiction	Documentary	
2008	Good: Water	Documentary	
2008	Good: Immigration	Documentary	
2008	Good: Education	Documentary	
2008	Good: Alcohol Olympics	Documentary	
2009	Good: Atomic Alert	Documentary	
2009	Good: The Green Hotel	Video short	
2009	Good: Animal Guns	Video short	
2010	Saab Story	Documentary	
2012	Garden of Eden	Video short	
2013	12 Years of DFA: Too Old To Be New, Too New To Be Classic	Documentary	
2015	We Are Your Friends	Drama	
2017	DICKS: Do you need to be one to be a successful leader?	Documentary	
2019	BOOKSTORES: How to Read More Books in the Golden Age of Content	Documentary	
2021	15 Minutes of Shame	Documentary	

Television
Year	Film	Role	Notes
2012–2018	Catfish: The TV Show	Co-host and cinematographer	Absent for 5 episodes due to We Are Your Friends

== Awards and nominations ==
Award	Year	Category	Work	Result	Ref.
Teen Choice Award	2014	Choice TV Personality: Male	Catfish: The TV Show	Nominated	
