= Paranormal Activity: Next of Kin =

2021 film by William Eubank

- Promotional release poster
- Directed by: William Eubank
- Written by: Christopher Landon
- Based on: Paranormal Activity by Oren Peli
- Produced by: Jason Blum; Oren Peli
- Starring: Emily Bader; Roland Buck III; Dan Lippert; Henry Ayres-Brown
- Cinematography: Pedro Luque
- Edited by: Todd E. Miller
- Production companies: Paramount Players; Blumhouse Productions; Solana Films; Room 101, Inc.
- Distributed by: Paramount+
- Release date: October 29, 2021
- Running time: 98 minutes
- Country: United States
- Language: English

Paranormal Activity: Next of Kin is a 2021 American supernatural horror film directed by William Eubank, written by Christopher Landon, and produced by Jason Blum and series creator Oren Peli. Serving as a reboot and the seventh of the Paranormal Activity series, the film stars Emily Bader, Roland Buck III, Dan Lippert, Henry Ayres-Brown, and Tom Nowicki, and follows a group who attempt to make a documentary on an Amish community, only for them to discover the horrific secrets the town holds.

Although Paranormal Activity: The Ghost Dimension was promoted as the final installment in the original series, Paramount Pictures announced in June 2019 that a seventh installment and stand-alone sequel was in development, with Blum and franchise creator Peli returning as producers. Landon was hired to write the script in early 2020, with Eubank set to direct in February 2021. Principal photography was wrapped by July 2021.

Paranormal Activity: Next of Kin was released in the United States on Paramount+ on October 29, 2021. The film received generally negative reviews from critics and grossed $81,596 in home sales. In December 2025, it was announced that an eighth film was in development, and is scheduled to be released in May 2027.

== Plot ==
Margot and her cameraman friend Chris want to make a documentary about Margot's past. Her mother, Sarah, abandoned her outside a hospital, and she wonders what drove Sarah to make such a decision. Through a genetics site, she and Chris meet her blood relative Samuel, who is an Amish currently going through his rumspringa. The team is joined by Dale, their documentary's soundman. Samuel leads them to Beiler Farm, where he and Margot's mother came from.

Jacob, the patriarch of the commune and Sarah's father and Margot's grandfather, welcomes the team, and they find lodging. Strange events occur; Margot finds a little girl brushing her doll's hair in the barn. The doll is named Sarah, and the girl cryptically says that Sarah is "still there." Margot later hears sounds from her mother's old room and sees a spirit.

The group interviews Jacob. He tells them about the free-spirited Sarah, who defied their practices by sleeping with a boy and getting pregnant. Instead of being forced to give up Margot to an adoptive family, Sarah instead left her at a hospital before disappearing, and is now presumed dead. Margot's team finds a church that Jacob prevents them from entering. That night, the team follow a group of commune residents to the barn, and covertly observe a strange ritual in which a newborn two-headed goat is sacrificed.

Determined to find out the commune's secrets, Margot and Chris break into the church. They discover paintings depicting the demonic figure Asmodeus, as well as a deep pit. Margot sneaks into Jacob's room the next day, where she finds a hidden laptop and discovers that he and Samuel had already known about her being Sarah's daughter and had orchestrated her arrival. A ghoulish being attacks Margot that night. The next day, Chris and Dale find her catatonic with her sheets soaked with blood.

Chris and Dale hitch a ride into town to buy a replacement battery for their car, and are informed by the mailman that the people at Beiler Farm are not Amish. After researching on the Internet, they learn that according to myth, the Norwegian village of Beskytter suffered a massacre believed to be caused by Asmodeus. They trapped the demon inside the body of a woman, and the demon continues to be passed from mother to daughter in the bloodline. Margot is next in line, which is why Sarah sent her away and why she was brought to the settlement.

When Chris and Dale return to the commune, Margot has disappeared. While Dale installs the new car battery so they can escape, Chris enters the church to search for Margot. After encountering and killing Jacob, Chris rescues Margot from the bottom of the pit, but they are pursued by a skeletal creature. The creature kills Dale and pursues Margot and Chris into the barn. Margot, realizing that the creature is Sarah possessed by Asmodeus, calls her by her name, which confuses her. Taking advantage of her mother's weakened state, Margot sends Sarah falling to her death onto a spiked row of farm tools.

Following Sarah's death, Asmodeus is unleashed upon Beiler Farm, causing chaos as the residents turn on one another, and both livestock and homes go up in flames. Margot and Chris escape in their car. Some time later, two police officers arrive on the scene, discover the aftermath of the massacre, and find a demonically-possessed Samuel mimicking a baby's cry. Samuel compels the officers to take their own lives, before he drives away in their car.

== Cast ==
- Emily Bader as Margot
- Roland Buck III as Chris
- Dan Lippert as Dale
- Jaye Ayres-Brown as Samuel Beiler
- Tom Nowicki as Jacob Beiler
- Kyli Zion and Kirby Johnson as the demon

== Production ==
On June 19, 2019, Paramount Pictures announced that a seventh installment of the film series was in development, with Jason Blum and franchise creator Oren Peli. In February 2020, Blum revealed that Christopher Landon was writing the script. On February 12, 2021, it was announced that William Eubank was attached to direct the film, with the film also confirmed to be a reboot rather than a continuation of the previous films. On February 24, the film was announced to be in production with The In Between and an untitled Pet Sematary film for Paramount+. In March, Emily Bader, Roland Buck III, Dan Lippert, and Henry Ayres-Brown were cast in undisclosed roles.

Principal photography concluded in July. In September, the film's title was officially revealed to be Paranormal Activity: Next of Kin. In October, Tom Nowicki was revealed as part of the cast.

== Release ==
Paranormal Activity: Next of Kin was released in the United States on Paramount+ on October 29, 2021. The film was originally set for a theatrical release on March 19, 2021, but was delayed to March 4, 2022, due to the COVID-19 pandemic. Instead of the theatrical release, the film was released exclusively on Paramount+. ViacomCBS CEO Robert Bakish said the film would premiere before the end of 2021. The film's release was officially moved up to October 29, 2021.

== Reception ==
=== Critical response ===
On the review aggregator website Rotten Tomatoes, 32% of 47 critics' reviews are positive, with an average rating of 4.9/10. The website's consensus reads: "Paranormal Activity: Next of Kin gives the long-running found-footage franchise a new level of visual polish; unfortunately, effective scares are few and far between." On Metacritic, the film has a score of 37 out of 100 based on reviews from 13 critics, indicating "generally unfavorable reviews".

== Future ==
In December 2025, a new installment in the Paranormal Activity franchise was reported to be in development. According to The Hollywood Reporter, the project marks a renewed effort by Paramount Pictures to continue the series following the release of Paranormal Activity: Next of Kin in 2021.

The film is being developed with James Wan serving as a producer alongside Jason Blum and Oren Peli, the creator of the original 2007 film. Paramount has described the project as a "priority theatrical release," suggesting a return to cinemas for the series rather than a streaming-only debut. Ian Tuason (Undertone) was later announced as director. The film is scheduled to be released on May 21, 2027. Chase Yi, Sonia Mena and Mara da Costa joined the cast. Filming began in Toronto on July 13, 2026, and wrapped on August 26, 2026.
