= Paranormal Activity 2: Tokyo Night =

2010 film by Toshikazu Nagae

- Theatrical release poster
- Directed by: Toshikazu Nagae
- Written by: Toshikazu Nagae
- Based on: Paranormal Activity by Oren Peli
- Produced by: Yasutaka Hanada; Takeshi Kase; Kenichi Nakayama
- Starring: Aoi Nakamura; Noriko Aoyama
- Cinematography: Tōru Hirao
- Production company: Presidio Corporation
- Distributed by: Presidio Corporation
- Release date: November 20, 2010 (Japan)
- Running time: 90 minutes
- Country: Japan
- Language: Japanese
- Budget: ¥1.3 million
- Box office: ¥41.7 million

Paranormal Activity 2: Tokyo Night (Japanese: パラノーマル・アクティビティ 第2章 TOKYO NIGHT, Hepburn: Paranōmaru Akutibiti Dai Nishō Tōkyō Naito) is a 2010 Japanese supernatural horror film written and directed by Toshikazu Nagae. Commissioned by the Japanese distributor Presidio Corporation, the film is based on the 2007 American film Paranormal Activity by Oren Peli and documents events that follow from the original film.

== Plot ==
In March 2007, during a stay in San Diego, California (the setting of the first movie), Japanese student Haruka Yamano (Noriko Aoyama) is involved in a car accident that breaks both of her legs. She returns to her home in Tokyo in the care of her 19-year-old brother Koichi (Aoi Nakamura) after her father Shigeyuki leaves for a business trip abroad.

One morning, Haruka discovers that her wheelchair has moved even though the wheels were locked. Koichi suspects it to be a paranormal force and places a mound of salt in Haruka's room, which becomes scattered the next day. Despite Haruka being dismissive, Koichi investigates further, and eventually, she lets him continue filming after a glass cup spontaneously breaks during dinner. Soon, they notice that multiple objects around the house have moved on their own from the camera footage. On the day when Koichi's friend Jun Nagoshi (Kōsuke Kujirai) visits with his girlfriend and her friend Misuzu Kure, Misuzu screams and foams at the mouth while examining Haruka's room.

Koichi contacts a Shinto priest for a purification ceremony, and after the priest has done so, he tells the siblings that the presence has calmed down. After two days with no incidents, their father Shigeyuki returns home. On night 12, Haruka's wheelchair moves toward the camera and cuts it off, making the siblings realize that the presence is still in the house. Koichi tries contacting the Shinto priest but is told the priest died of a heart attack after leaving them. The incidents begin to worsen in violence, as Haruka is dragged out of bed by her hair. Haruka tries to contact Shigeyuki but he does not answer his call.

Haruka recalls Katie (from the first movie), a woman involved in the same car accident that cut her trip short. After researching her online, she believes that the demon that had possessed Katie is now targeting them. She reveals to Koichi that she experienced similar strange phenomena while recuperating in the hospital in America. That night, she shows him a strange bite mark on her arm before losing consciousness. In the morning, Koichi places a crucifix in her hand. After he leaves, Haruka drops the crucifix, and it combusts, with windows breaking. Upon discovering the scorched crucifix and broken glass, Koichi becomes shocked and devastated.

On night 15, Haruka wakes up at 1 AM and stands by Koichi's bedside, staring at him for two hours while he is asleep. She then walks downstairs and screams. Alarmed, Koichi runs down and discovers Shigeyuki's corpse in the closet. A possessed Haruka becomes violent, causing Koichi to flee and board a taxi. As he escapes, Haruka appears in front, and the taxi strikes into her before crashing.

Through security footage at a funeral home, Koichi arrives to pay his respects to Haruka, who is believed to have died in the crash. When he removes the sheet, he is shocked to see it is the body of the taxi driver. Koichi is suddenly dragged into the darkness screaming and the camera cuts. When it runs again, Haruka is staring at it with a demonic grin, and a growl is heard. An epilogue text states that Koichi and Shigeyuki were found dead and Haruka is missing.

== Cast ==
- Aoi Nakamura as Koichi Yamano
- Noriko Aoyama as Haruka Yamano
- Kazuyoshi Tsumura as Shigeyuki Yamano
- Kōsuke Kujirai as Jun Nagoshi
- Maaya Morinaga as Mai Yaguchi
- Ayako Yoshitani as Misuzu Kure
- Tōze Yamada as the Exorcist
- Shinji Matsubayashi as the Exorcist's Assistant

== Release ==
=== Theatrical ===
Paranormal Activity 2: Tokyo Night was released on November 20, 2010, in Japan.

=== Home media ===
Paranormal Activity 2: Tokyo Night was released onto rental DVD and Blu-ray on March 4, 2011. It was then released for home entertainment in Japan on April 5, 2011, and internationally on-demand by AMC Theatres on September 13, 2022, as part of a bundle with the rest of the English language film series.
