= Ashley Palmer (actress) =

American actress and singer (born 1978)

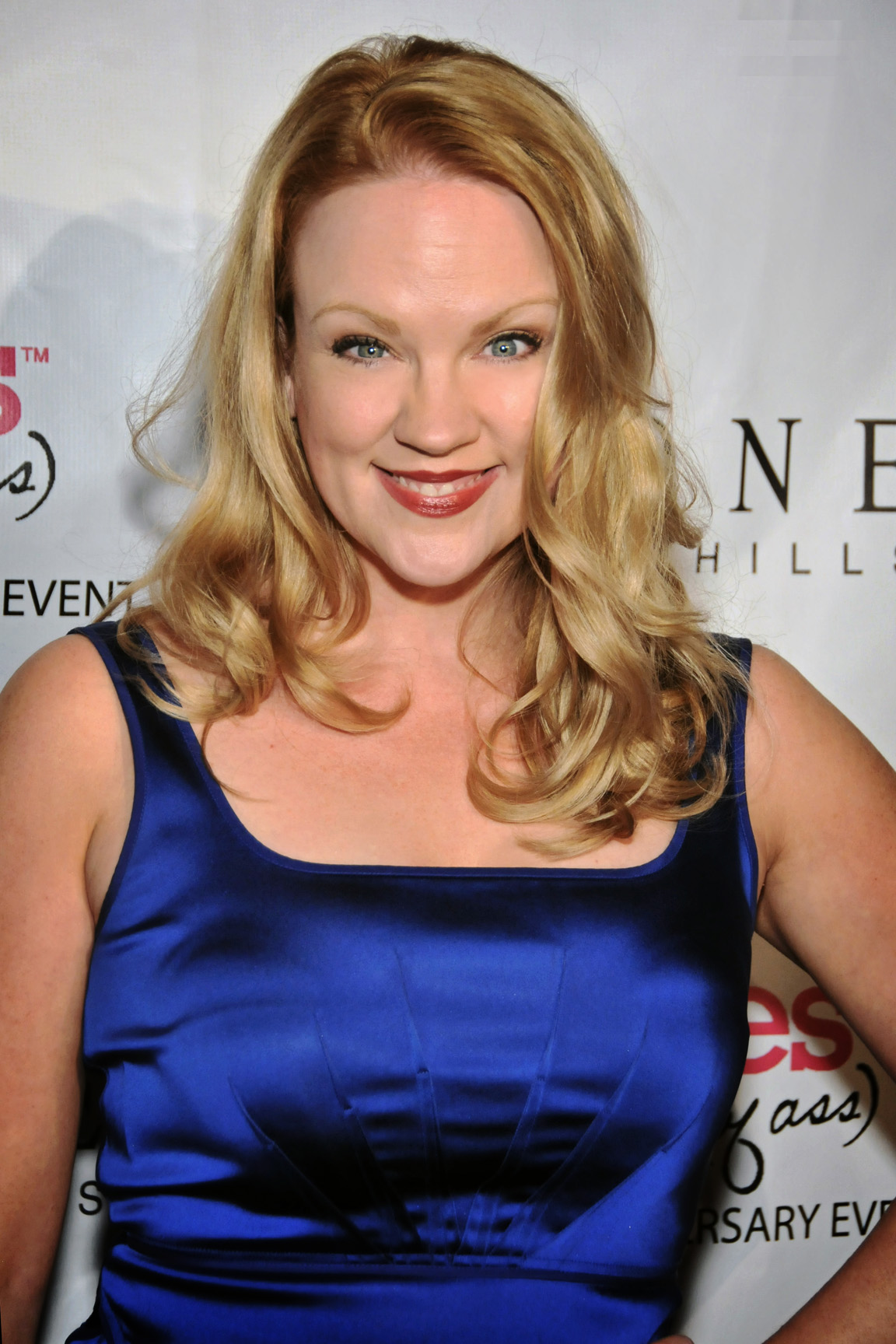
- Ashley Palmer, Hollywood, California on March 28, 2013
- Born: November 13, 1978 (age 47); Naperville, Illinois, U.S.
- Education: Otterbein College (BFA)
- Occupation: Actress

Ashley Elizabeth Palmer (born November 13, 1978) is an American actress and singer best known for her appearance in the 2007 hit horror film, Paranormal Activity.

== Early life and education ==
Palmer starred in her first play at age 5 while growing up in Naperville, Illinois, and spent her childhood performing and studying theater, dance and music. Before high school, her family relocated to Loveland, Ohio. While attending Loveland High School, she also studied singing, dancing and acting at the University of Cincinnati – College-Conservatory of Music prep program.

Her first professional acting job was in 1995 when, at age 16, she played the lead role of Polly Browne in The Boy Friend on the showboat Majestic. The following year she played Luisa in The Fantasticks at a historic Over-the-Rhine theater. She earned several scholarships to study musical theatre, and graduated cum laude with a Bachelor of Fine Arts from Otterbein College in Westerville, Ohio.

== Career ==
In 2000, Palmer moved to New York City where she worked in summer stock, regional and children's touring theatre and independent film before being selected for the original cast of the Off-Broadway show Pieces (of Ass). Despite her part getting cut in her first TV job, a restaurant hostess in the final season of Sex and the City, she relocated to Los Angeles in 2004 to pursue film and television work.

Once in Hollywood she studied film acting and also took improv classes at the famed Upright Citizens Brigade Theatre. In 2005 was cast in the pilot episode of Kitchen Confidential, which was based on the life of Anthony Bourdain, and could be seen canoodling with the star Bradley Cooper. She performed with a comedy group and played funny roles in several web series before being considered for the lead role in the hit horror film Paranormal Activity, which she had submitted herself to, hoping to combine her improv skills with dramatic acting.

In 2007, when she didn't land the role played by Katie Featherston, Oren Peli offered Palmer the memorable part of Diane, who is seen in an online video having the same demonic possession as the main character. The role was gory and intense which drew attention at Screamfest Horror Film Festival and Slamdance Film Festival but was shortened significantly in the changes made by Steven Spielberg and Paramount Pictures before the film's theatrical release in 2009.

In 2010, she played Marla in the poker movie Hitting the Nuts, and appeared in on television on Criminal Minds, Desperate Housewives, State of the Union and Big Love. In 2011, Palmer was seen as a dancer in Water for Elephants and a young mom on NBC's Love Bites and shot the feature film A Strange Brand of Happy with Rebecca St. James and Shirley Jones, released in 2013. When not acting she hosts shows and events, conducts red carpet interviews and does travel writing.

== Filmography ==
=== Film ===
- Water for Elephants (2011)
- Hitting the Nuts (2010)
- Saving Rent (2009)
- Paranormal Activity (2007)
- Heights (2005)
- Crocodile (2000)

=== Television ===
- Straight on till Morning (2011)
- Love Bites (2011)
- Desperate Housewives (2010)
- State of the Union (2010)
- Criminal Minds (2010)
- Big Love (2010)
- Happy Hour (2008)
- The Chelsea Handler Show (2006)
- Kitchen Confidential (2005)
- Sex and the City (2003)

== Stage Work ==
=== Off-Broadway ===
- Pieces (Of Ass) Ashley (2003)

=== Regional Theatre ===
- And the Winner Is Serenity (2009)
- Olympic Spirit Helena (2002)
- Singin' in the Rain (musical) Lina Lamont (2001)
- Man of La Mancha Fermina (2001)
- Saturday Night (musical) Florence (2001)
- King Island Christmas Ensemble (2000)
- You're a Good Man, Charlie Brown Sally (2000)
- Lysistrata Lysistrata (2000)
- Six Degrees of Separation (play) Elizabeth (1999)
- Camelot (musical) Lady Sybil (1998)
- A Chorus Line Barbara (1998)
- Cinderella (Rodgers and Hammerstein musical) Cinderella (1997)
- The Importance of Being Earnest Cecily (1997)
- Sweet Charity Ursula (1996)
- The Fantasticks Luisa (1996)
- The Boy Friend Polly Browne (1995)
