= Area 51 (film) =

2015 American found footage horror film by Oren Peli

- Theatrical release poster
- Directed by: Oren Peli
- Written by: Oren Peli; Christopher Denham
- Produced by: Jason Blum
- Starring: Reid Warner; Darrin Bragg; Ben Rovner; Jelena Nik
- Cinematography: Oren Peli
- Edited by: Blake Maniquis; Jake York
- Production companies: Insurge Pictures; Blumhouse Productions; IM Global; Incentive Filmed Entertainment; Solana Films; Room 101, Inc.
- Distributed by: Paramount Pictures
- Release date: May 15, 2015
- Running time: 91 minutes
- Country: United States
- Language: English
- Budget: $5 million
- Box office: $7,556

Area 51 is a 2015 American found footage science fiction horror film directed and shot by Oren Peli and co-written by Peli and Christopher Denham. The film stars Reid Warner, Darrin Bragg, Ben Rovner, and Jelena Nik. The film was produced by Jason Blum under his Blumhouse Productions banner, and was released in a limited release and through video on demand on May 15, 2015, by Paramount Insurge. It is the second and most recent film directed by Peli, and unlike the original Paranormal Activity film, it was panned by both critics and audiences.

== Plot ==
Three close friends, Reid, Darrin, and Ben, attend a party, during which Reid disappears. Unable to find him, Ben and Darrin leave, but on the drive home they nearly hit Reid, who is standing dazed in the middle of a dark, secluded road.

Afterwards, Reid becomes obsessed with aliens and Area 51, spending three months planning to infiltrate the base and uncover its secrets. His research isolates him from his family and costs him his job. He recruits Darrin and Ben, as well as Jelena, a fellow conspiracy theorist whose deceased father worked at Area 51. Equipped with signal jammers, night vision goggles, Freon-laced jumpsuits, and pills to mask their ammonia levels, they plan to enter the base. Jelena believes her father was murdered for learning too much and suggests investigating a senior base official. Ben, Reid, and Darrin follow the man home and steal his security badge.

That night, Ben leaves Reid, Darrin, and Jelena in the desert and waits for them to return. The trio bypass the base's defences and use the stolen badge to enter. Deep underground, they discover a laboratory containing anti-gravity material and a lifelike liquid substance, as well as an alien spacecraft that only Reid can enter or interact with. They reach the secretive 'S4' level, but trigger an alarm and are pursued by guards. Darrin becomes separated, narrowly escaping a predatory alien before retreating to the upper levels.

Reid and Jelena descend further and discover a cavern beneath Area 51 containing articles of clothing, toys and pods filled with human blood and organs. They encounter a colony of sleeping aliens, one of which awakens and chases them into another part of the complex. In a white chamber, Reid examines alien symbols while an unseen force drags Jelena away. He finds her unresponsive and apparently in a trance. The chamber then loses gravity, revealing that they are aboard a silver alien spacecraft; Reid's camera falls from it to the ground.

Darrin escapes and discovers that the base personnel are evacuating Area 51. He returns to the desert and finds Ben, explaining that the group was separated and urging him to leave. Their car's engine dies, and the camcorder records their abduction.

In a post-credits scene, an old man previously interviewed by the group finds Reid's camcorder, which is still recording.

== Cast ==
- Reid Warner as Reid
- Darrin Bragg as Darrin
- Jelena Nik as Jelena
- Ben Rovner as Ben
- Sandra Staggs as Mother
- Roy Abramsohn as Father
- Frank Novak as himself
- David Saucedo as Town Local
- Glenn Campbell as himself
- Jamel King as Jamel Bragg
- Nikka Far as Nikki
- Norio Hayakawa as himself

== Production ==
Production for the film began in the fall of 2009. In April 2011, CBS Films hired director and actor Christopher Denham to do some rewrites on Area 51. Peli filmed re-shoots in 2013. In August 2013, Jason Blum stated that the film had finished production and that Peli was "tinkering" with the film in post production. On March 14, 2015, Blum confirmed that the film was officially done and would perhaps be released on VOD. On April 23, 2015, it was announced the film would open exclusively in Alamo Drafthouse theaters and through video on demand platforms on May 15, 2015.

== Release ==
=== Box office and sales ===
The film was released in Alamo Drafthouse theaters exclusively for a weekend-long-run, and on video on demand platforms beginning on May 15, 2015, courtesy of Paramount Insurge and Blumhouse Tilt. The film made a total of $7,556 for its weekend long-run.

=== Reception ===
Area 51 was heavily panned by critics. On Rotten Tomatoes, it has an approval rating of 13% based on reviews from eight critics.

Brian Tallerico writing for RogerEbert.com gave the film one and half stars and mainly criticized the film's generic plot and pacing. A. A. Dowd from The A.V. Club gave Area 51 a 'C'-rating and criticized the film's originality when compared to Oren Peli's previous film, Paranormal Activity. James Shotwell of Under the Gun Review gave the film a D−. In a review where he gave the film no stars, Bob Brinkman of HorrorNews.net wrote: "Area 51 is an interesting concept, with mediocre delivery, and a scare factor of zero. It is lazy film making at its worst, and it is easy to understand why the movie sat in the can so long (six years) prior to being released. It was not worth the wait."
