= Eventful =

American events discovery website

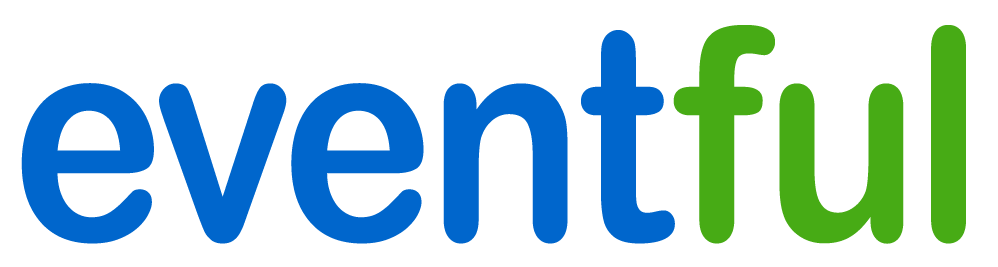
- Type: Subsidiary
- Industry: Social networking; Events discovery
- Founded: 2004; 22 years ago
- Founder: Brian Dear
- Headquarters: San Diego, California, US
- Parent: Audacy, Inc.
- Website: audacy.com/eventful

Eventful is an online calendar and events discovery service owned by Audacy, Inc. The service allows users to search for and track upcoming entertainment events in their area (such as concerts, festivals, and film presentations) involving specific performers, indicate and share their intent to attend certain events, and indicate their "demand" for certain acts to appear in their region. As of February 2021, the site has been replaced by a link to Entercom's radio.com site, which includes a limited music-event-listing functionality.

== Functionality ==
Users can search for events worldwide by time, location, performer, and descriptive keyword. Users can create private or public calendars, including "smart" calendars which automatically update when events matching search criteria are added or existing events are modified. As of July 2007, the company claimed it had approximately 4 million future events in its search engine index. Users can optionally share their intention of attending an event with friends, and designate their favorite performers and venues to be used for recommendations.

Eventful Demand allows users to declare an event or performance they would like to see locally, and then campaign for others to join their "demand". Statistics from "demands" can be used by event organizers to gauge interest in holding an event in that location.

An API is provided to use Eventful information in other programs and websites, such as mashups, as well as to load new or modify existing data about events, venues, or performers.

== History ==
Eventful was founded as EVDB, Inc. in January 2004 in La Jolla, California, by Brian Dear, a veteran of eBay, the late-90s MP3.com, and early consumer-Linux startup Eazel. A public beta test under the name EVDB.com was launched in March 2005, and the service changed its name to Eventful.com that September.

In 2008, a number of notable users of the Demand system began to emerge; various campaigns during the presidential election used the system, most notably John Edwards. In 2009, Eventful was notably used in relation to the film Paranormal Activity; its director Oren Peli invited users to vote for where the film would be screened next on its limited release by utilizing the Demand system. Twelve of the thirteen venues sold out.

By June 2012 the service had grown to over 20 million users. In July 2014, Eventful was acquired by CBS Corporation through its Local Media division for an undisclosed amount. The purchase aligned the service with the company's radio station group and its own local event strategies. The service was then spun off with the rest of CBS Radio into CBS Radio's merger with Entercom.

In January 2024, Eventful's parent company Audacy filed for Chapter 11 bankruptcy protection. As part of the bankruptcy reorganization, Audacy made a deal with its creditors to transfer control to them while cutting approximately $1.6 billion of its debt.

== See also ==
- Upcoming
