= Jason Blum =

American film producer (born 1969)

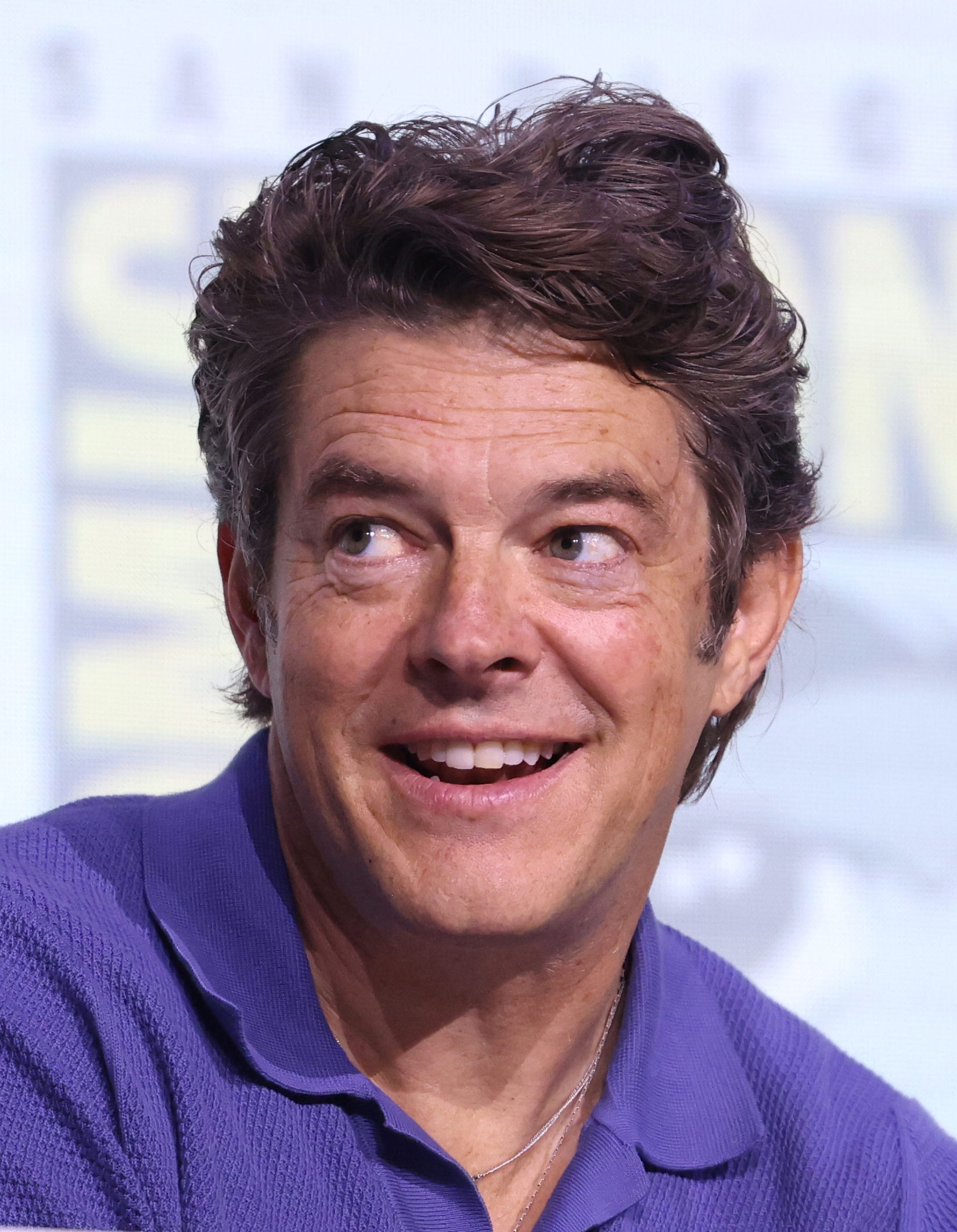
- Blum at the 2025 San Diego Comic-Con
- Born: February 20, 1969 (age 57); Los Angeles, California, U.S.
- Occupation: Producer
- Years active: 1995–present
- Spouse: Lauren A. E. Schuker (m. 2012)
- Children: 3
- Parents: Irving Blum (father); Shirley Neilsen Blum (mother)

Jason Ferus Blum (/blʌm/; born February 20, 1969) is an American producer. He is the founder and CEO of Blumhouse Productions, best known for horror franchises including Paranormal Activity (2007–2021), Insidious (2010–present), The Purge (2013–2021), and Halloween (2018–2022).

Blum was nominated to receive the Academy Award for Best Picture for Whiplash, Get Out, and BlacKkKlansman. He won a Primetime Emmy Award for Outstanding Television Movie for the drama film The Normal Heart (2014) and a Primetime Emmy Award for Outstanding Documentary or Nonfiction Series for the documentary miniseries The Jinx (2015). He also received a nomination for the Tony Award for Best Musical for Death Becomes Her (2024).

== Early life ==
Jason Ferus Blum was born in Los Angeles on February 20, 1969, the son of art professor Shirley Neilsen Blum (née Neilsen) and independent art dealer Irving Blum. His father served as director of the Ferus Gallery. He graduated from New York's Vassar College in 1991. He was a roommate of future filmmaker Noah Baumbach during his time there, and later produced Baumbach's first film Kicking and Screaming (1995).

== Career ==
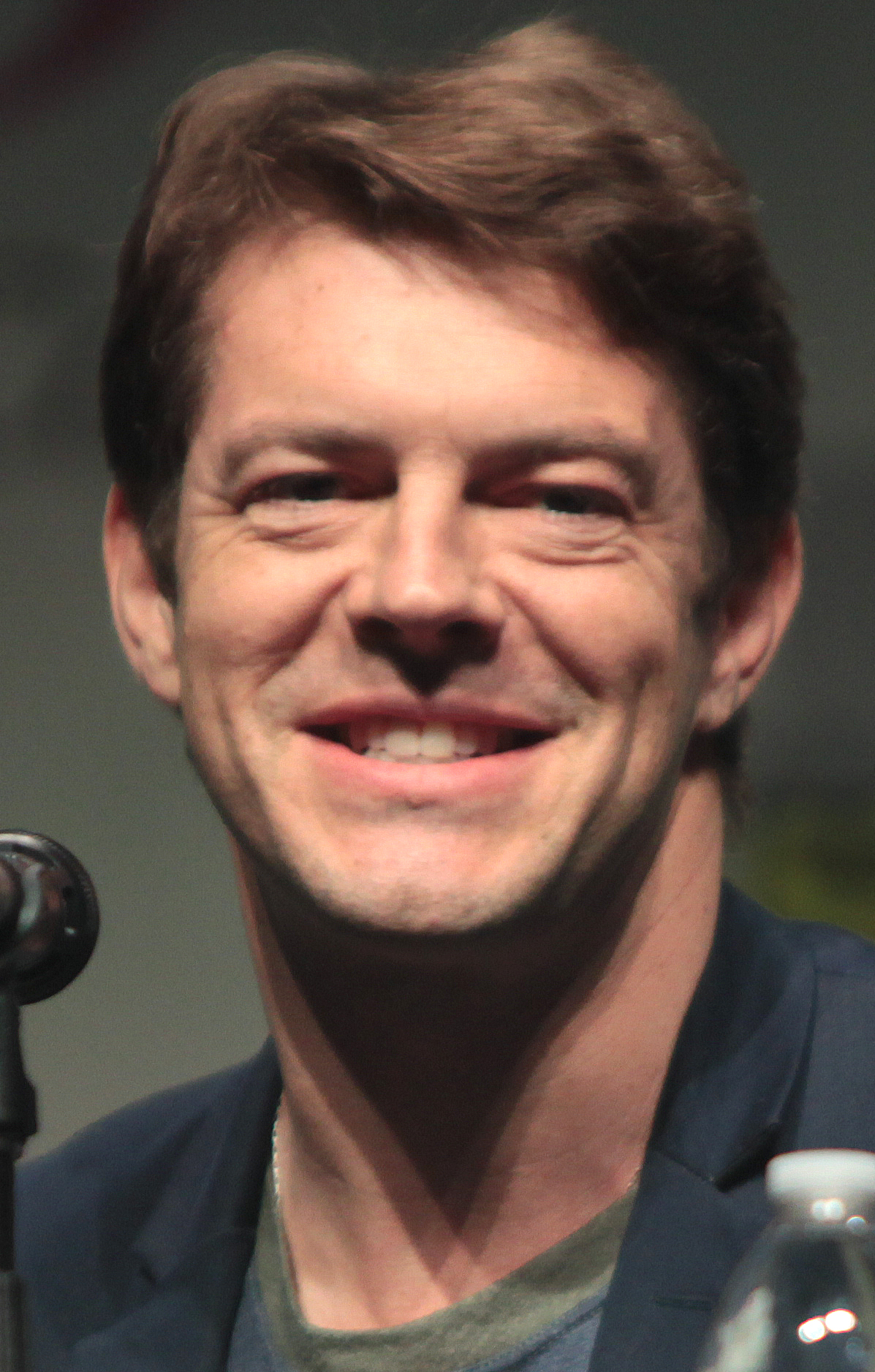
Blum at the 2015 Wondercon

Blum found work as an executive for Bob and Harvey Weinstein at their production company Miramax, and later as an independent producer for Paramount Pictures. Prior to his tenure at Miramax, he was a producing director at the Malaparte theater company in New York. He is a member of the board of trustees of the Academy Museum of Motion Pictures. He obtained financing for his first film as producer, Kicking and Screaming (1995), after asking family friend Steve Martin to read the script and write a letter endorsing it if he enjoyed it. After Martin obliged, Blum replaced the title page of the script with copies of Martin's letter before he sent the script to Hollywood executives.

In 2000, Blum founded Blumhouse Productions, which is known for producing micro-budget films that give directors full creative control. Bloomberg News praised him for making "blockbusters for pennies", the first example of which came with the horror film Paranormal Activity (2007), which became one of the most profitable films of all time as it grossed nearly $200 million on a $15,000 budget. In addition, Planet Money released a special podcast episode about the company's methods, referring to Blum as the "business genius behind Get Out".

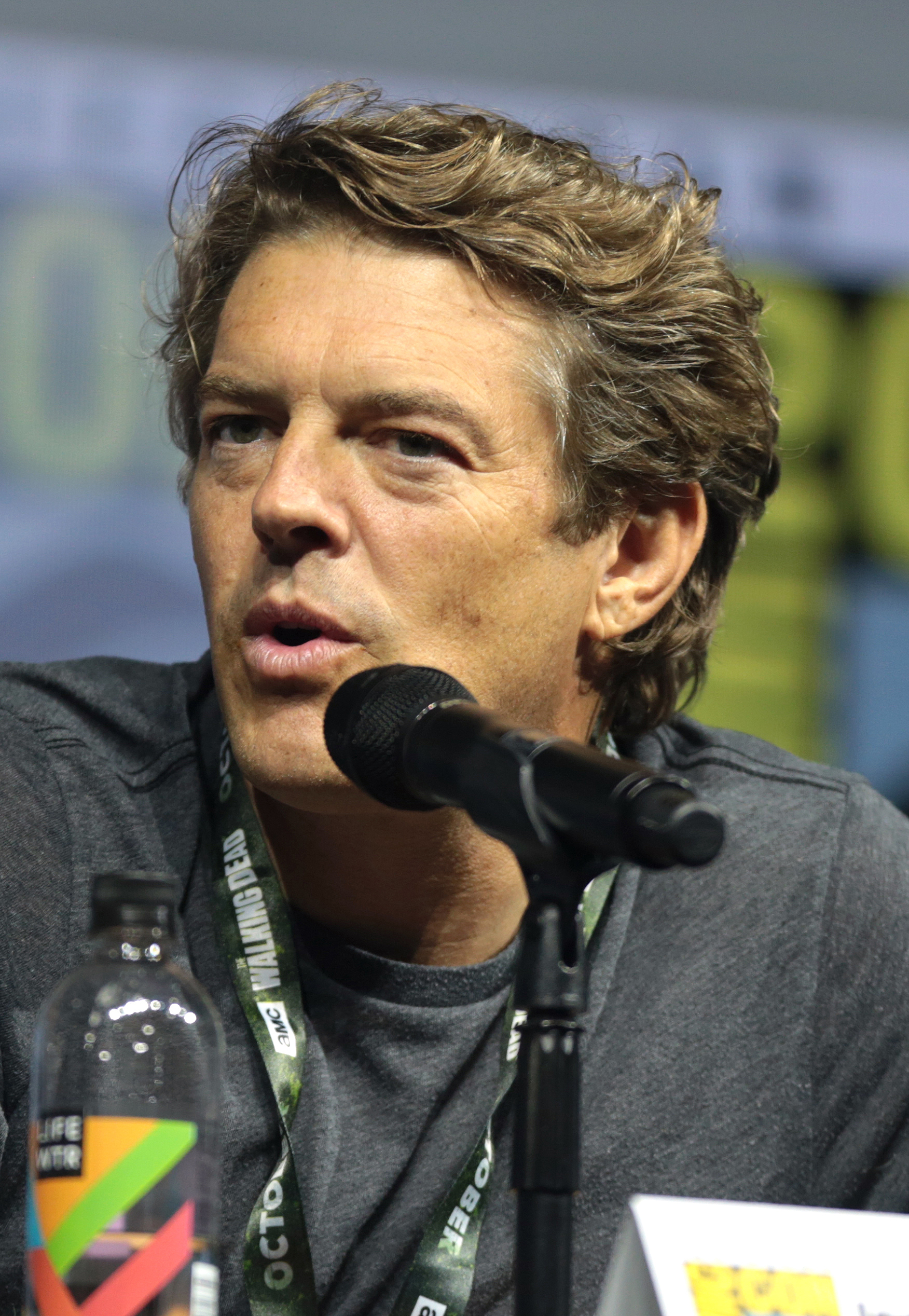
Blum at the 2018 San Diego Comic-Con

Blum also produced Insidious (2010), Sinister (2012), The Purge (2013) and Happy Death Day (2017), as well as their sequels. In 2014, he served as executive producer for the television film The Normal Heart, which went on to win the Primetime Emmy Award for Outstanding Television Movie. In 2015, he won an Emmy Award for Outstanding Documentary or Nonfiction Series for HBO's The Jinx. BlacKkKlansman, Whiplash, and Get Out, all produced by Blum, were nominated for the Academy Award for Best Picture.

In 2018, Blum said in an interview that the reason no woman had ever directed a Blumhouse horror film was that "there are not a lot of female directors [...] and even less who are inclined to do horror", but said that he hoped to one day achieve this goal. After much criticism on social media, in which lists of such directors were widely circulated, he apologized for what he called his "dumb comments". Sophia Takal co-wrote and directed the Blumhouse horror remake Black Christmas (2019), the studio's first theatrically released film by a female director.

== Other ventures ==
=== Political views ===
In June 2018, Blum told Variety that his upcoming prequel The First Purge would deal with racial tensions in the U.S. and said that all of the films in The Purge franchise have a political slant, giving examples such as the first film primarily being a parable about gun control and the third film addressing class warfare. He said, "[Horror] reaches an audience in which politics may not be front of mind and it makes politics front of mind. The Purge reaches an audience that isn't thinking of gun control every day and might start thinking of gun control. If every time there's a shooting in the United States, the government's answer is put more guns in people's hands, then what The Purge is showing doesn't seem all that crazy. Donald Trump keeps saying 'give teachers guns'. I could see him saying 'let people shoot whoever they want to for 12 hours a year'."

In November 2018, Blum (who is of Jewish heritage) attended the Israel Film Festival in Los Angeles to accept an award for Achievement in Film and Television. In his acceptance speech, he said, "A lot is on the line [in the midterms]. The last two years have been hard for all of us who cherish the freedom as citizens of this country. The great thing about this country is that you can like Trump, but I don't have to, and I can say what I feel about it—and I don't like it." He was heavily booed, to which he responded, "As you can see from this auditorium, it's the end of civil discourse. We have a president who calls the press the enemy of the people. Thanks to our president, antisemitism is on the rise." Yossi Dina tried unsuccessfully to pull Blum off the stage. Blum later tweeted the full speech, which said in part, "Nationalism is surging. Dog whistle politics are rampant and antisemitism is on the rise in ways my generation never thought imaginable." He received support from fellow Jews such as Judd Apatow and Jamie Lee Curtis, while festival director Meir Fenigstein stated that the audience "greatly lacked respect" and "turned an evening of celebration and recognition into something else" by booing him.

=== Business ===
On August 14, 2020, Daily Front Row listed Blum as one of a group of high-profile investors who purchased failing fashion magazine W. After appearing on an episode of Shark Tank, Blum made a deal with American Immersion Theater, the leading immersive theater company in the U.S.

=== Philanthropy ===
In 2022, Blum donated $10 million to Vassar College, which was noted as the largest gift ever given to the college from a male alumnus. Blum sits on the boards of the Public Theater in New York, the Sundance Institute, Vassar College, and the Academy Museum of Motion Pictures.

== Personal life ==
Blum married journalist Lauren A. E. Schuker in Los Angeles on July 14, 2012. The couple has two daughters (born 2015, 2021) and one son (born 2018). They currently reside in a townhouse in Brooklyn Heights, which he purchased for $9.8 million in 2019.

== Filmography ==
=== Film ===
==== Universal Pictures ====
Producer

Year	Title	Director	Notes
2013	The Purge	James DeMonaco	
2014	Not Safe for Work	Joe Johnston	
2014	The Purge: Anarchy	James DeMonaco	
2014	Mockingbird	Bryan Bertino	
2014	Mercy	Peter Cornwell	
2014	Stretch	Joe Carnahan	
2014	Ouija	Stiles White	
2015	The Boy Next Door	Rob Cohen	
2015	Visions	Kevin Greutert	
2015	The Visit	M. Night Shyamalan	
2015	Curve	Iain Softley	
2015	Jem and the Holograms	Jon M. Chu	
2016	The Veil	Phil Joanou	Direct-to-video
2016	The Purge: Election Year	James DeMonaco	
2016	Split	M. Night Shyamalan	
2016	Ouija: Origin of Evil	Mike Flanagan	
2017	Get Out	Jordan Peele	
2017	Stephanie	Akiva Goldsman	
2017	The Keeping Hours	Karen Moncrieff	
2017	Happy Death Day	Christopher Landon	
2018	Insidious: The Last Key	Adam Robitel	
2018	Unfriended: Dark Web	Stephen Susco	Through OTL Releasing
2018	Upgrade	Leigh Whannell	Through OTL Releasing
2018	Truth or Dare	Jeff Wadlow	
2018	Delirium	Dennis Iliadis	Direct-to-video
2018	The First Purge	Gerard McMurray	
2018	Halloween	David Gordon Green	
2018	Seven in Heaven	Chris Eigeman	
2019	Glass	M. Night Shyamalan	
2019	Don't Let Go	Jacob Aaron Estes	Through OTL Releasing
2019	Sweetheart	J. D. Dillard	
2019	Happy Death Day 2U	Christopher Landon	
2019	Us	Jordan Peele	
2019	Ma	Tate Taylor	
2019	Black Christmas	Sophia Takal	
2020	The Invisible Man	Leigh Whannell	
2020	The Hunt	Craig Zobel	
2020	You Should Have Left	David Koepp	
2020	Freaky	Christopher Landon	
2021	The Forever Purge	Everardo Gout	
2021	This Is The Night	James DeMonaco	
2021	Halloween Kills	David Gordon Green	
2022	Firestarter	Keith Thomas	
2022	The Black Phone	Scott Derrickson	
2022	Halloween Ends	David Gordon Green	
2023	M3GAN	Gerard Johnstone	
2023	The Exorcist: Believer	David Gordon Green	
2023	Five Nights at Freddy's	Emma Tammi	
2024	Night Swim	Bryce McGuire	
2024	Speak No Evil	James Watkins	
2025	Wolf Man	Leigh Whannell	
2025	The Woman in the Yard	Jaume Collet-Serra	
2025	Drop	Christopher Landon	
2025	M3GAN 2.0	Gerard Johnstone	
2025	Black Phone 2	Scott Derrickson	
2025	Five Nights at Freddy's 2	Emma Tammi	
2026	Soulm8te	Kate Dolan	
2026	The Last Kiss	Yoko Okumura	
2027	The Exorcist: Martyrs	Mike Flanagan	Post-production
TBA	Merrily We Roll Along	Richard Linklater	Filming, until at least 2040

Executive producer

- Unfriended (2014)
- River (2026)

==== Paramount Pictures ====
Producer

Year	Title	Director	Notes
2007	Paranormal Activity	Oren Peli	
2010	Paranormal Activity 2	Tod Williams	
2011	Paranormal Activity 3	Henry Joost; Ariel Schulman	
2012	Paranormal Activity 4	Henry Joost; Ariel Schulman	
2014	Paranormal Activity: The Marked Ones	Christopher Landon	
2015	Area 51	Oren Peli	
2015	Paranormal Activity: The Ghost Dimension	Gregory Plotkin	
2021	Paranormal Activity: Next of Kin	William Eubank	Via Paramount+
2027	Paranormal Activity	Ian Tuason	

Executive producer

- A House on the Bayou (2021)
- American Refugee (2021)
- Torn Hearts (2022)
- Unhuman (2022)
- The Visitor (2022)
- There's Something Wrong with the Children (2023)
- Unseen (2023)
- The Passenger (2023)

==== Lionsgate Films ====
Year	Title	Director	Notes
2012	Sinister	Scott Derrickson	
2012	The Bay	Barry Levinson	With Roadside Attractions
2014	Jessabelle	Kevin Greutert	
2019	The Gallows Act II	Chris Lofing; Travis Cluff	
2024	Imaginary	Jeff Wadlow	

==== Focus Features ====
Producer

Year	Title	Director	Notes
2015	Insidious: Chapter 3	Leigh Whannell	With Gramercy Pictures
2015	Sinister 2	Ciarán Foy	With Gramercy Pictures
2016	In a Valley of Violence	Ti West	
2018	BlacKkKlansman	Spike Lee	
2022	Vengeance	B. J. Novak	
2026	The Uprising	Paul Greengrass	
2027	Anything but Ghosts	Curry Barker	Post-production

Executive producer

- Bathtubs Over Broadway (2018)
- Obsession (2025)
- Play House (2026)

==== Sony Pictures Releasing ====
Year	Title	Director	Notes
2014	Whiplash	Damien Chazelle	Through Sony Pictures Classics
2020	Fantasy Island	Jeff Wadlow	
2020	The Craft: Legacy	Zoe Lister-Jones	
2023	Insidious: The Red Door	Patrick Wilson	
2024	Afraid	Chris Weitz	
2026	Insidious: Out of the Further	Jacob Chase	

==== Netflix ====
Producer

Year	Title	Director	Notes
2016	Hush	Mike Flanagan	
2018	Benji	Brandon Camp	
2022	Our Father	Lucie Jourdan	Documentary
2022	Mr. Harrigan's Phone	John Lee Hancock	

Executive producer

- A Secret Love (2020) (Documentary)
- Pray Away (2020) (Documentary)

==== Amazon MGM Studios ====
Executive producer

- Black Box (2020)
- Evil Eye (2020)
- Nocturne (2020)
- Bingo Hell (2021)
- Black as Night (2021)
- Madres (2021)
- The Manor (2021)
- Nanny (2022)
- The Bondsman (2025)

Producer

- The Lie (2018)
- Run Sweetheart Run (2020)
- Totally Killer (2023)

==== FilmDistrict ====
Producer

Year	Title	Director	Notes
2010	Insidious	James Wan	
2013	Insidious: Chapter 2	James Wan	
2016	The Darkness	Greg McLean	Through High Top Releasing; With BH Tilt
2016	Incarnate	Brad Peyton	Through High Top Releasing; With BH Tilt

Executive producer

- The Green Inferno (2013)
- Sleight (2016)
- Birth of the Dragon (2016)

==== The Weinsteins ====
Producer

Year	Title	Director	Notes
2013	Dark Skies	Scott Stewart	Through Dimension Films and The Weinstein Company
2016	Viral	Henry Joost; Ariel Schulman	Through Dimension Films and RADiUS-TWC
2017	Amityville: The Awakening	Franck Khalfoun	Through Dimension Films and RADiUS-TWC

Executive producer

- Hamlet (2000)
- The Adventures of Tom Thumb and Thumbelina (2002)
- The Reader (2008)
- Lawless (2012)
- 13 Sins (2014)

==== Other ====
Producer

Year	Title	Director	Distribution	Notes
1995	Kicking and Screaming	Noah Baumbach	Trimark Pictures	Associate producer
2003	Easy Six	Chris Iovenko		
2006	The Darwin Awards	Finn Taylor	Metro-Goldwyn-Mayer; Icon Productions	
2006	Griffin & Phoenix	Ed Stone	Metro-Goldwyn-Mayer	
2008	The Accidental Husband	Griffin Dunne	Yari Film Group	
2010	Tooth Fairy	Michael Lembeck	20th Century Fox	
2012	The Babymakers	Jay Chandrasekhar	Millennium Entertainment	
2012	The Lords of Salem	Rob Zombie	Anchor Bay Entertainment	
2013	Plush	Catherine Hardwicke	Millennium Entertainment	
2013	Best Night Ever	Jason Friedberg; Aaron Seltzer	Magnolia Pictures	
2014	Creep	Patrick Brice	The Orchard	
2014	The Town That Dreaded Sundown	Alfonso Gomez-Rejon	Orion Pictures	
2015	The Lazarus Effect	David Gelb	Relativity Media	
2015	The Gallows	Chris Lofing; Travis Cluff	Warner Bros. Pictures	
2015	The Gift	Joel Edgerton	STX Entertainment	
2015	Martyrs	Kevin Goetz; Michael Goetz	Anchor Bay Entertainment	
2016	Lowriders	Ricardo de Montreuil	BH Tilt	
2017	Creep 2	Patrick Brice	The Orchard	
2018	Bloodline	Henry Jacobson	Momentum Pictures	
2019	Adopt a Highway	Logan Marshall-Green	RLJE Films	
2019	Prey	Franck Khalfoun	Cinedigm	Direct-to-video
2021	Groomed	Gwen van de Pas	Discovery+	Documentary
2021	Dashcam	Rob Savage	Momentum Pictures	
2022	They/Them	John Logan	Peacock	
2025	The Lost Bus	Paul Greengrass	Apple TV+	
2026	Lee Cronin's The Mummy	Lee Cronin	Warner Bros. Pictures	
2026	Strung	Malcolm D. Lee	Peacock	

Executive producer

- One Way Out (1996)
- Graduation (2007)
- The FP (2011)
- Oculus (2013)
- Exeter (2015)
- Fifteen (2015) (Short film)
- Stockholm (2018)
- The Vigil (2019)
- Pharma Bro (2021) (Documentary)
- Exposure (2022)
- Soft & Quiet (2022)

Actor

- Unknown Dimension: The Story of Paranormal Activity (2021) (Documentary film, himself)

=== Television ===
Executive producer

Year	Title	Notes
2002	Hysterical Blindness	TV movie
2004	The Fever	TV movie
2012	The River	8 episodes
2013	Stranded	6 episodes
2014	The Normal Heart	TV movie
2014	Ascension	Miniseries
2015	Eye Candy	10 episodes
2015	The Jinx	Miniseries
2015	South of Hell	8 episodes
2015	Hellevator	12 episodes
2015–2016	#15SecondScare	14 episodes
2016	Judgment Day: Prison or Parole?	3 episodes
2016	12 Deadly Days	12 episodes
2017	Election Day: Lens Across America	TV movie
2017	Cold Case Files	10 episodes
2018	Run for Your Life	TV pilot
2018	Ghoul	Miniseries
2018	Sharp Objects	Miniseries
2018	Sacred Lies	20 episodes
2018	Tremors	TV pilot
2019	Smiley Face Killers: The Hunt for Justice	6 episodes
2019	The Loudest Voice	Miniseries
2019	No One Saw a Thing	6 episodes
2019	Liberty: Mother of Exiles	TV movie
2018–2021	Into the Dark	22 episodes
2018–2019	The Purge	20 episodes
2020	Kill Chain: The Cyber War on America's Elections	TV movie
2020	Betaal	4 episodes
2020	A Wilderness of Error	5 episodes
2020	The Good Lord Bird	Miniseries
2022	The Thing About Pam	
2023	The Horror of Dolores Roach	8 episodes
2025	The Rainmaker	
2025	Nightmares of Nature	
2026	Scarpetta	
2026	Worst Neighbor Ever	

Producer

Year	Title	Notes
2009	Washingtonienne	TV pilot

== Awards and nominations ==
Year	Association	Category	Work	Result
2010	25th Independent Spirit Awards	Best First Feature	Paranormal Activity	Nominated
2014	66th Primetime Emmy Awards	Outstanding Television Movie	The Normal Heart	Won
2015	72nd Golden Globe Awards	Best Miniseries or Television Film	The Normal Heart	Nominated
2015	26th Producers Guild of America Awards	Best Long-Form Television	The Normal Heart	Nominated
2015	26th Producers Guild of America Awards	Best Theatrical Motion Picture	Whiplash	Nominated
2015	4th AACTA International Awards	Best Film	Whiplash	Nominated
2015	30th Independent Spirit Awards	Best Film	Whiplash	Nominated
2015	87th Academy Awards	Best Picture	Whiplash	Nominated
2015	67th Primetime Emmy Awards	Outstanding Documentary or Nonfiction Series	The Jinx	Won
2016	27th Producers Guild of America Awards	Best Non-Fiction Television	The Jinx	Won
2017	Gotham Independent Film Awards 2017	Best Feature	Get Out	Nominated
2018	75th Golden Globe Awards	Best Motion Picture – Musical or Comedy	Get Out	Nominated
2018	29th Producers Guild of America Awards	Best Theatrical Motion Picture	Get Out	Nominated
2018	33rd Independent Spirit Awards	Best Film	Get Out	Won
2018	90th Academy Awards	Best Picture	Get Out	Nominated
2018	Gotham Independent Film Awards 2018	Breakthrough Series – Long Form	Sharp Objects	Nominated
2019	76th Golden Globe Awards	Best Motion Picture – Drama	BlackKklansman	Nominated
2019	76th Golden Globe Awards	Best Miniseries or Television Film	Sharp Objects	Nominated
2019	30th Producers Guild of America Awards	Best Limited Series Television	Sharp Objects	Nominated
2019	30th Producers Guild of America Awards	Best Theatrical Motion Picture	BlackKklansman	Nominated
2019	72nd British Academy Film Awards	Best Film	BlackKklansman	Nominated
2019	91st Academy Awards	Best Picture	BlackKklansman	Nominated
2019	71st Primetime Emmy Awards	Outstanding Limited Series	Sharp Objects	Nominated
2020	77th Golden Globe Awards	Best Miniseries or Television Film	The Loudest Voice	Nominated
2021	41st Golden Raspberry Awards	Worst Picture	Fantasy Island	Nominated
2022	75th Locarno Film Festival	Premio Raimondo Rezzonico (Best Independent Producer)	Himself	Won
2024	44th Golden Raspberry Awards	Worst Picture	The Exorcist: Believer	Nominated
2025	78th Tony Awards	Best Musical	Death Becomes Her	Nominated
