= NFL Xtreme =

1998 video game

- Developer: 989 Sports
- Publisher: Sony Computer Entertainment
- Platform: PlayStation
- Release: NA: July 13, 1998; UK: January 1999
- Genre: Sports
- Modes: Single-player, multiplayer

NFL Xtreme is an American football video game developed by 989 Studios and published by Sony Computer Entertainment for the PlayStation. The game was intended to be a competitor to Midway Games' NFL Blitz series. The cover athlete is Tampa Bay Buccaneers fullback Mike Alstott.

== Gameplay ==
Unlike real football, each game is a five-on-five matchup and every player is an eligible receiver. In addition, there are no boundaries or penalties, and a first down is 20 yards.

The game also offers standard football video game features such as create-a-player, draft picks, and season play, and includes full NFL licensing with real NFL teams and schedules.

== Development ==
NFL Xtreme was built on the same game engine as NFL Gameday '98. However, because the game uses a much smaller number of players - five on each side - the developers were able to use more polygons in each player without taxing the hardware, allowing more detailed players.

Film director Oren Peli, best known for the 2007 found footage film Paranormal Activity, was a programmer for NFL Xtreme.

== Reception ==
Reception

Aggregate score
Aggregator	Score
GameRankings	56%

Review scores
Publication	Score
AllGame	2.5/5
Electronic Gaming Monthly	4.5/10
Game Informer	6.5/10
GameFan	90%
GamePro	4.5/5
GameRevolution	C
GameSpot	3.5/10
IGN	5/10
Next Generation	2/5
Official U.S. PlayStation Magazine	2/5

The game received "mixed" reviews according to the review aggregation website GameRankings. Next Generation said that the game was "no NFL Blitz. NFL Mel-O would have been a more apt title." GameFan gave the game universal acclaim, over a month before it was released Stateside.

== Sequel ==
A sequel to Xtreme, NFL Xtreme 2, was released the following year, and as of 2026 is the final game in the series.
