= Paranormal Activity (franchise) =

American supernatural horror franchise

- Created by: Oren Peli
- Original work: Paranormal Activity (2007)
- Owners: Paramount Pictures; Blumhouse Productions
- Years: 2007–present

Films and television
- Films: Paranormal Activity (2007); Paranormal Activity 2 (2010); Paranormal Activity 3 (2011); Paranormal Activity 4 (2012); Paranormal Activity: The Marked Ones (2014); Paranormal Activity: The Ghost Dimension (2015); Paranormal Activity: Next of Kin (2021); Paranormal Activity (2027)

Theatrical presentations
- Play: Paranormal Activity (2024)

Paranormal Activity is an American supernatural horror franchise consisting of seven films and additional media. Created by Oren Peli, the original film of the same name premiered in 2007 and was widely released in 2009. The latest film, Paranormal Activity: Next of Kin, was released in 2021. An eighth film is in production.

The films are typically based around various families who become haunted by an evil demon known as "Tobi" that stalks, terrifies, and ultimately murders several members of the family and other bystanders during the course of the films. The series makes use of production cameras set up as security cameras or other recording devices in an attempt to present the films as found footage.

The series has received overall mixed reviews across all films. The first and third films received generally positive critical reception, the second film received mixed reviews, and the fourth, fifth, sixth, and seventh films received generally negative reviews. The series was financially successful, making strong profits based on return on investment. The series as a whole has grossed over thirty times the overall budget.

== Films ==
Paranormal Activity films
Film	U.S. release date	Directed by	Screenplay by	Story by	Produced by
Original series
Paranormal Activity	September 25, 2009	Oren Peli	Oren Peli	Oren Peli	Oren Peli, Jason Blum & Steven Schneider
Paranormal Activity 2	October 22, 2010	Tod Williams	Tom Pabst, Michael R. Perry & Christopher Landon	Michael R. Perry	Oren Peli & Jason Blum
Paranormal Activity 3	October 21, 2011	Henry Joost & Ariel Schulman	Christopher Landon	Christopher Landon	Oren Peli, Jason Blum & Steven Schneider
Paranormal Activity 4	October 19, 2012	Henry Joost & Ariel Schulman	Christopher Landon	Chad Feehan	Oren Peli & Jason Blum
Paranormal Activity: The Marked Ones	January 3, 2014	Christopher Landon	Christopher Landon	Christopher Landon	Oren Peli & Jason Blum
Paranormal Activity: The Ghost Dimension	October 23, 2015	Gregory Plotkin	Jason Pagan, Adam Robitel, Gavin Heffernan & Andrew Deutschman	Brantley Aufill, Jason Harry Pagan & Andrew Deutschman	Oren Peli & Jason Blum
Paranormal Activity	October 22, 2027	Ian Tuason	Ian Tuason	Ian Tuason	Oren Peli, Jason Blum & James Wan
Reboot series
Paranormal Activity: Next of Kin	October 29, 2021	William Eubank	Christopher Landon	Christopher Landon	Oren Peli & Jason Blum

Paranormal Activity story chronology
Original continuity
- Paranormal Activity 3 (2011)
- Paranormal Activity 2 (2010)
- Paranormal Activity (2007)
- Paranormal Activity 4 (2012)
- Paranormal Activity: The Marked Ones (2014)
- Paranormal Activity: The Ghost Dimension (2015)
Reboot continuity
- Paranormal Activity: Next of Kin (2021)

=== Original series ===
==== Paranormal Activity (2007) ====
Set in October 2006, a young couple, Katie and Micah, who have recently moved to a new house in San Diego, California, are terrorized by a demon that has stalked Katie since childhood. The film is designed to look like a found footage-styled film with Micah filming the activity in their house.

==== Paranormal Activity 2 (2010) ====
Set in August to October 2006, beginning two months before the events of the first film, Katie's sister Kristi and her family reside in Carlsbad, California, where they experience strange activity after her baby, named Hunter, is born. The film uses security cameras and in some scenes, a hand-held camera to film the activity in the house.

==== Paranormal Activity 3 (2011) ====
Set in September 1988, it focuses on a younger Katie and Kristi, who live with their mother Julie and her boyfriend, Dennis, in Santa Rosa, California. They experience sightings and then encounter "Tobi" the demon for the very first time. Concerned, Dennis decides to set up a few cameras around the house with the help of his friend Randy, who also encounters "Tobi" as well. There are many cameras set around the house, one of which is attached to a small oscillating fan that moves the camera back and forth from the kitchen area to the living room and vice versa. The film also uses a hand-held camera handled mainly by Dennis.

==== Paranormal Activity 4 (2012) ====
Set in November 2011, the film focuses on Alex Nelson and her family residing in a neighborhood in Henderson, Nevada. The family began to experience hauntings, concerning Alex's adopted brother, Wyatt, after Katie and her mysterious son, Robbie, move in across the street. Alex is helped by her boyfriend, Ben, to film the activity via MacBook webcams, a video camera, an iPhone camera and Kinect technology.

==== Paranormal Activity: The Marked Ones (2014) ====
Set in June 2012, the film follows a Latino community in Oxnard, California, where a group of high school graduates deal with the demon of a mysterious cult which has "marked" one of them. They document their experiences using basic tools of recording and with clues from the previous films to try to understand what is happening to them. The Marked Ones is the last film in the series to feature Katie Featherston.

==== Paranormal Activity: The Ghost Dimension (2015) ====
Set in December 2013, the film follows the Fleeges, a family of three who, after having relocated to a house in Santa Rosa, California, discover several tapes, set in 1992, that show Katie and Kristi in the midst of their initiation ritual to enter a demonic coven. The family begins to be haunted by the demon when the daughter, Leila, is targeted as she was born on the same date as Hunter from Paranormal Activity 2. Along with normal recorders, the family also discovers a unique video recorder that can visibly show supernatural happenings, which they use to record the increasing paranormal activities.

==== Paranormal Activity (2027) ====
In December 2025, a new installment in the Paranormal Activity franchise was reported to be in development. According to The Hollywood Reporter, the project marks a renewed effort by Paramount Pictures to continue the series following the release of Paranormal Activity: Next of Kin in 2021.

The film is being developed with James Wan serving as a producer alongside Jason Blum and Oren Peli, the creator of the original 2007 film. Paramount has described the project as a "priority theatrical release," suggesting a return to cinemas for the series rather than a streaming-only debut. Ian Tuason (Undertone) was later announced as director. In June 2026, Chase Yi and Sonia Mena was cast in the lead roles. The next month, Maya da Costa joined the cast. Filming began in Toronto on July 13, 2026, and is expected to wrap on August 26, 2026. The film is scheduled to be released on October 22, 2027. The film was previously scheduled to release on May 21, 2027.

=== Reboot ===
==== Paranormal Activity: Next of Kin (2021) ====
A seventh installment, Next of Kin, was directed by William Eubank with a script by Christopher Landon. Originally scheduled for release on March 19, 2021, the film was delayed to October 29. Due to the negative impact of the COVID-19 pandemic on cinema, the project skipped its theatrical release and was instead released via streaming, as a Paramount+ exclusive film. Set in March 2021, it follows a young woman named Margot who, alongside her small film crew, attempts to make a documentary on an Amish community to try and find out more about Margot's mysterious past, only for them to discover the horrific secrets the town holds.

== Cast ==
List indicators
- A dark grey cell indicates that the character was not in the film or that the character's presence in the film has yet to be announced.
- An ^{A} indicates an appearance through archival footage or stills.
- A ^{C} indicates a cameo role.
- A ^{I} indicates an infant version of the character.
- A ^{T} indicates a toddler version of the character.
- A ^{M} indicates mentioned characters only.
- A ^{U} indicates an uncredited role.
- A ^{V} indicates a voice-only role.
- A ^{Y} indicates a younger version of the character.

Character	Films							Web series	Video game
Character	Paranormal Activity	Paranormal Activity 2	Paranormal Activity 3	Paranormal Activity 4	Paranormal Activity: The Marked Ones	Paranormal Activity: The Ghost Dimension	Paranormal Activity: Next of Kin	Paranormal Activity: The Jacob Degloshi Tapes	Paranormal Activity: The Lost Soul
Character	2007	2010	2011	2012	2014	2015	2021	2012	2017
Asmodeus "Tobi" of the Book of Tobit	Katie Featherston	Katie Featherston	Unseen	Katie Featherston	Andrew Jacobs Katie Featherston^{A}	Mark Steger	Kirby Johnson Kyli Zion Henry Ayres-Brown	Mentioned	Jessica Belkin^{V} Palmer Naftal^{V}
Katie Featherston	Katie Featherston	Katie Featherston	Chloe Csengery^{Y} Katie Featherston^{C}	Katie Featherston	Katie Featherston^{C}^{A} Chloe Csengery^{Y}^{C}	Chloe Csengery^{Y}^{A}		Chloe Csengery^{Y}^{A}	
Micah Sloat	Micah Sloat	Micah Sloat			Micah Sloat^{C}				
Dr. Fredrichs	Mark Fredrichs								
Amber	Amber Armstrong								
Diane	Ashley Palmer								
Kristi Rey (née Featherston)	Mentioned	Sprague Grayden	Jessica Tyler Brown^{Y} Sprague Grayden^{C}	Sprague Grayden^{A}	Jessica Tyler Brown^{Y}^{C}	Jessica Tyler Brown^{Y}^{C}		Sprague Grayden^{A}	
Daniel Rey		Brian Boland	Brian Boland^{C}	Brian Boland^{A}		Mentioned		Brian Boland^{A}	
Ali Rey		Molly Ephraim			Molly Ephraim^{C}			Molly Ephraim^{A}	
Hunter Rey Wyatt Nelson		Jackson Xenia Prieto^{I} William Juan Prieto^{T}		Aiden Lovekamp William Juan Prieto^{U}^{A}^{T}		Aiden Lovekamp^{C}			
Martine		Vivis Cortez							
Dennis			Chris Smith			Chris Smith^{A}		Chris Smith^{A}	
Julie Featherston	Mentioned		Lauren Bittner		Lauren Bittner^{P}	Lauren Bittner^{A}		Lauren Bittner^{A}	
Lois Featherston			Hallie Foote		Hallie Foote^{P}^{U}	Hallie Foote^{C}		Hallie Foote^{A}	
Randy Rosen			Dustin Ingram						
Lisa			Johanna Braddy						
Alexandra "Alex" Nelson				Kathryn Newton		Mentioned			
Doug Nelson				Stephen Dunham		Mentioned			
Holly Nelson				Alexondra Lee		Mentioned			
Ben				Matt Shively					
Robbie				Brady Allen					
Sarah Degloshi				Georgica Pettus				Georgica Pettus	
Jacob Degloshi								Matthew Jaeger	
Jesse Arista					Andrew Jacobs				
Hector Estrella					Jorge Diaz				
Marisol Vargas					Gabrielle Walsh				
Irma Arista					Renée Victor				
Arturo Lopez					Richard Cabral				
Ryan Fleege						Chris J. Murray			
Emily Fleege						Brit Shaw			
Mike Fleege						Dan Gill			
Leila Fleege						Ivy George			
Skyler						Olivia Taylor Dudley			
Margot							Emily Bader		
Chris							Roland Buck III		
Dale							Dan Lippert		
Samuel Belier							Jaye Ayres-Brown		
Jacob Belier							Tom Nowicki		
Kat Thomas									Jessica Belkin^{V}
Blake Thomas									Palmer Naftal^{V}
The Witch									Emily O'Brien^{V}

== Production ==
=== Development ===
First-time director Oren Peli had been afraid of ghosts his whole life, even fearing the comedy film Ghostbusters, but intended to channel that fear into something positive and productive. Peli took a year to prepare his own house for shooting, going so far as to repaint the walls, add furniture, put in a carpet, and build a stairwell. In this time, he also did extensive research into paranormal phenomena and demonology stating, "We wanted to be as truthful as we could be." The decision to make the supernatural entity in the story a demon was a result of the research pointing to the most malevolent and violent entities being "demons."

The phenomena in the film take place largely at night—the vulnerability of being asleep, Peli reasoned, taps into a human being's most primal fear, stating, "If something is lurking in your home there's not much you can do about it."

Attempting to focus on believability rather than action and gore, Peli chose to shoot the picture with a home video camera. In deciding on a more raw and stationary format (the camera was almost always sitting on a tripod or something else) and eliminating the need for a camera crew, a "higher degree of plausibility" was created for the audience and they were "more invested in the story and the characters". Peli says that the dialogue was "natural" because there was no real script. Instead, the actors were given outlines of the story and situations to improvise, a technique known as "retroscripting" used in the making of The Blair Witch Project.

In casting the movie, Peli auditioned "a few hundred people" before finally meeting Katie Featherston and Micah Sloat. He originally auditioned them individually and later called them back to audition together. Peli was impressed with the chemistry between the actors, saying, "If you saw the footage, you would've thought they had known each other for years." During a guest appearance on The Jay Leno Show on November 3, 2009, Sloat and Featherston explained they each saw the casting call on LACasting. Featherston noted they were originally paid $500 for their work. The film was shot out of sequence due to Peli's self-imposed seven-day shooting schedule, though Peli would have preferred the story unfold for the actors as he had envisioned it. Sloat, who controlled the camera for a good deal of the film, was a former cameraman at his university's TV station. "It was a very intense week", Peli recalled, stating that the film would be shot day and night, edited at the same time, and would have the visual effects applied to it as the acting footage was being finalized.

Paramount and DreamWorks hired screenwriter Michael R. Perry to create Paranormal Activity 2. Oren Peli, the director of the first film, served as a producer for this prequel. Kevin Greutert, director of Saw VI, was initially hired to direct the prequel; however, Lions Gate Entertainment exercised a clause in Greutert's contract to have him direct the final film in the Saw film series. Both of the actors from the first film, Katie Featherston and Micah Sloat, reprise their roles in the prequel. Tod Williams directed Paranormal Activity 2, which started production in May 2010 and was released in October the same year.

Paranormal Activity 3 and 4 were directed by Henry Joost and Ariel Schulman, documentary filmmakers who were well known for their feature debut Catfish. Production on the third entry began in June 2011, with a release October 21 of the same year. Filming for the fourth film commenced in June 2012, with a release of October 19.

A Latin American-themed fifth film, Paranormal Activity: The Marked Ones was released on January 3, 2014. Oren Peli, the creator of the franchise, returned to produce the film, while Christopher Landon, a screenwriter who had worked on the prior three entries in the series, served as the writer and director.

The sixth film in the series, Paranormal Activity: The Ghost Dimension, was announced to be released on October 25, 2013. However, in August 2013, the release date was pushed back to October 24, 2014. On September 17, 2014, the film's title was finalized and the release date was set on March 27, 2015, later changed to October 23, 2015.

In September 2013, it was confirmed that Gregory Plotkin, a film editor who had edited every release in the series since Paranormal Activity 2, would make his directorial debut with the sixth film. Oren Peli, the creator of the franchise, and Jason Blum would return to produce the sixth film. In late September 2013, Paramount hired Project Almanac writers Jason Pagan and Andrew Deutschman to write the screenplay. Though series writer Christopher Landon said that several sequels would follow The Ghost Dimension to wrap up the story, producer Jason Blum later confirmed that the film would indeed be the last in the series.

He said:

"It's coming to an end. This is it, the finale. We're saying it before the movie opens. We're not going to grind this horror franchise into the ground. This will keep Paranormal Activity as part of this culture and this particular time in a really fantastic way… All the questions that everyone has asked from the past 'Paranormal Activity' films: What does Tob- look like? What's the backstory to the families? These questions have been teased out. Now they will be answered."

A seventh film was released on October 29, 2021.

In December 2025, an eighth film was reported to be in development. Ian Tuason is set to direct, with James Wan, Blum and Peli producing, and is set to release in theaters on May 21, 2027.

== Reception ==
=== Box office performance ===
Films	U.S. release date	Box office gross			Box office ranking		Budget	Ref.
Films	U.S. release date	North America	Other territories	Worldwide	All-time North America	All-time worldwide	Budget	Ref.
Paranormal Activity	September 25, 2009	$107,918,810	$86,264,224	$194,183,034	#486		$15,000	
Paranormal Activity 2	October 22, 2010	$84,752,907	$92,759,125	$177,512,032	#687		$3 million	
Paranormal Activity 3	October 21, 2011	$104,028,807	$103,011,037	$207,039,844	#514	#528	$5 million	
Paranormal Activity 4	October 19, 2012	$53,900,335	$88,917,657	$142,817,992	#1,253		$5 million	
Paranormal Activity: The Marked Ones	January 3, 2014	$32,462,372	$58,442,482	$90,904,854	#2,142		$5 million	
Paranormal Activity: The Ghost Dimension	October 23, 2015	$18,300,124	$60,603,000	$78,903,124	#3,288		$10 million	
Paranormal Activity: Next of Kin	October 29, 2021	—N/a	—N/a	—N/a	—N/a		—N/a	
Total		$401,363,355	$489,997,525	$891,360,880			$28,015,000	
List indicator: A dark grey cell indicates the information is not available for the film.

=== Critical and public response ===
Film	Rotten Tomatoes	Metacritic	CinemaScore
Paranormal Activity	82% (209 reviews)	68 (24 reviews)	—N/a
Paranormal Activity 2	58% (138 reviews)	53 (23 reviews)	B
Paranormal Activity 3	68% (124 reviews)	59 (25 reviews)	C+
Paranormal Activity 4	23% (111 reviews)	40 (22 reviews)	C
Paranormal Activity: The Marked Ones	40% (82 reviews)	42 (19 reviews)	C−
Paranormal Activity: The Ghost Dimension	16% (75 reviews)	30 (13 reviews)	C
Paranormal Activity: Next of Kin	32% (47 reviews)	37 (13 reviews)	—N/a (Note: This film was released on streaming service Paramount+; CinemaScore only provides ratings for films released in theaters.)

== Other media ==
=== Digital comic ===
In December 2009, a short digital comic entitled Paranormal Activity: The Search for Katie was released for the iPhone. It was written by Scott Lobdell and features art from Mark Badger.

=== Web series ===
As part of the promotional campaign for Paranormal Activity 4, the studio created a group of online accounts, including a YouTube account under the name "Jacob Degloshi". In a series of posted videos set a year after the events of the film, Alex Nelson's friend Sarah, who appears in the film itself, is chased by Tobi while her father researches VHS tapes that include previously unreleased footage from the second and third films.

=== Video games ===
An augmented reality game called Paranormal Activity: Sanctuary developed by Ogmento, was released in 2011. This mobile game was the first location-based augmented reality game ever produced, and combined vision-based AR with user-generated content and geo-social elements.

A video game called Paranormal Activity: The Lost Soul was released on August 15, 2017, for Microsoft Windows and PS4. The game was engineered for VR and made use of the PlayStation VR for the PlayStation as well as Oculus Rift and HTC Vive for Windows, but VR was not required for play. The game was nominated for "Best Sound Design for an Indie Game" at the 16th Annual Game Audio Network Guild Awards.

A video game titled Paranormal Activity: Threshold, developed by DarkStone Digital and published by DreadXP, was announced in 2024 for release in 2026. The game was cancelled in May 2026.

=== Documentary ===
A documentary about the making of the films called Unknown Dimension: The Story of Paranormal Activity, was released on October 29, 2021.

=== Related film ===
A Japanese-language Paranormal Activity sequel was released in 2010. It follows Haruka Yamano, who was in a car accident that broke her legs. She stayed home with her brother while their father was away as strange activity started happening in the house.

=== Stage play ===
A stage play based on the films also called Paranormal Activity written by Levi Holloway and directed by Felix Barrett premiered at the Courtyard at Leeds Playhouse on July 4, 2024, for a limited run until August 3. A US tour began in October 2025, prior to a 12-week run in London's West End from 5 December 2025 at the Ambassadors Theatre.

=== Podcast ===
Paranormal Activity: True Tales of Possession was released in July 2024 on Audible in collaboration with Paramount Pictures Audio, where the lead actors of the first film Katie Featherston and Micah Sloat examining real-life stories of demonic possession, tracing the phenomenon from its earliest known accounts to its modern-day headlines.
