= Kōsuke Kujirai =

Japanese actor, voice actor and singer (born 1987)

Kousuke Kujirai
- 鯨井 康介
- Born: July 20, 1987 (age 39); Saitama Prefecture, Japan
- Occupations: Actor, voice actor
- Years active: 2004–present
- Agent: Production Ogi
- Height: 178 cm (5 ft 10 in)
- Website: Official profile

Kousuke Kujirai (鯨井 康介, Kujirai Kōsuke; born July 20, 1987) is a Japanese actor, voice actor and singer. He is known for his role as Jenath Dira in the Get Ride! Amdriver anime series and Kaoru Kaido and The Prince of Tennis musical series, Tenimyu, and the live film adaptation, and as Panther in Eyeshield 21. He is currently employed by Production Ogi. His blood type is B.

== Career ==
He works primarily in stage productions, but has appeared in a few movies and television series and has lent his voice to a few anime series.

=== As Jenath Dira in Get Ride! Amdriver ===
In 2004, Kujirai earned his first acting role, voicing the main character, Jenath Dira, in the anime television series Get Ride! Amdriver.

He then later released a CD single for the series when he performed the second opening theme song to the show called READY?.

=== As Kaoru Kaidoh in The Prince of Tennis Musicals ===
Kujirai won the role of Kaoru Kaidoh, the viper-like 2nd year regular of Seigaku Middle School's tennis club, in the Prince of Tennis musical series, Tenimyu. From 2005 to 2006, he became the second actor to play Kaidoh as a member of the second generation Seigaku cast. He made his debut as Kaidoh on January 8, 2005, in the Side Yamabuki performance in Osaka. That same year, his role as Kaidoh was carried into the live adaptation film of the manga. On March 29, 2006, in the Dream Live 3rd live concert, he, along with the majority of the Seigaku cast, graduated from their roles.

However, Kujirai returned to play Kaidoh for the slated August 2006 Advancement Match Rokkaku musical, because actor Takahiro Tasaki, who was originally slated to play Kaidoh in the Rokkaku musical, left the production to pursue other opportunities; Kujirai was brought back as Tasaki's substitute. Afterwards, the role of Kaidoh was played by Tomo Yanagishita, Yuuichirou Hirata, and by Akihiro Hayashi. Kujirai and Tomo have played Kaidoh the longest.

=== As Kaoru Kaidoh in The Prince of Tennis Live-Action Film ===
Kujirai was able to carry on his role from the musicals to the live-adaptation film of the manga series of The Prince of Tennis. He, along with most of the principal cast members for the Seigaku Regulars, were able to reprise their roles in the movie. The only major casting change was the casting of Kanata Hongo as Ryoma Echizen, the main protagonist.

The Prince of Tennis was released on May 13, 2006, and opened on the tenth spot in the Japanese Box Office.

=== In the Byakkotai TV Drama ===
Kujirai appeared in the TV Asahi movie drama, Byakkotai, starring Yamashita Tomohisa and Tanaka Koki which was broadcast on January 6 and 7, 2007.

=== In Arakure KNIGHT ===
In 2007, Kujirai appeared in the film, Arakure KNIGHT (荒くれKNIGHT), the live-action movie adaptation of the 1982 to 1988 manga series, Aratanaru Shobaku by Satosi Yoshida. The film was released in April 2007.

Kujirai once again appeared alongside former Tenimyu castmates, Yuu Shirota, Masaki Kaji, Yoshikazu Kotani, and Kenta Kamakari.

== Personal life ==
Kujirai keeps a personal blog, which he updates regularly.

== Filmography ==
Year	Title	Role	Other notes
2004–2005	Get Ride! Amdriver	Jenath Dira	Anime Series
2004	The Place Promised in Our Early Days	Male Student	Anime film
2005	Eyeshield 21	Panther	Anime Series
2005	Onegai My Melody	Shinichi Uchida	Anime Series
2006	The Prince of Tennis	Kaoru Kaidoh	Film
2007	Byakkotai	Touzaburou Adachi	Television film
2007	Arakure KNIGHT	N/A	Film
2007	Jikuu Keisatsu Wecker Signa	Akira Makoto	Television series
2008	Tomica Hero Rescue Force	Ryuji	Television series (guest appearance – episode 4 & 46)
2008	Gokusen 3	Kousuke Oohira	Television series
2008	Katekyoo Hitman Reborn! Fate of Heat	Albito	Game
2009	Gokusen	Kousuke Oohira	Gokusen Theatrical Film
2009	Samurai Sentai Shinkenger	Shintaro	Television series (guest appearance – episode 35)
2010	Q10		Television series
2011	Paranormal Activity 2: Tokyo Night	Jun Nagoshi	Film
2016	Yowamushi Pedal Live Action	Junta Teshima	Television series
2019	Tokyo Wine Party People		Film

== Discography ==
=== Album ===
Kujirai released a mini-album on October 6, 2004, called Ready? for the anime television show, Get Ride! Amdriver. The song, Ready?, was recorded for the show's second opening theme song.

Album Stats

Album was released for the Get Ride! Amdriver anime television show in Japan (JPN), only.

Year	Cover	Info	Chart positions
Year	Cover	Info	JPN
2004		Ready?: Release date: October 6, 2004; 1st Studio album; Formats: CD	N/A

Track Listings

Track Listings for the Ready? Album:

1. "Ready?"
2. "Vivid"
3. "Ready? (Karaoke)"
4. "Vivid (Karaoke)"

== Stage ==
- 2006 as Ishimori Kenkichi in Yoisho! no Kamisama
- 2006 as Hibino Shuuichi in *pnish* vol. 7 [Treasure Box]

=== Musicals ===
TENIMYU: THE PRINCE OF TENNIS MUSICAL SERIES (as Kaoru Kaido)

- The Prince of Tennis Musical: Side Yamabuki feat. St. Rudolph (In Winter of 2004–2005)
- The Prince of Tennis Musical: Dream Live 2nd (2005)
- The Prince of Tennis Musical: The Imperial Match Hyotei Gakuen (2005)
- The Prince of Tennis Musical: The Imperial Match Hyotei Gakuen in Winter (In Winter of 2005–2006)
- The Prince of Tennis Musical: Dream Live 3rd (2006)
- The Prince of Tennis Musical: Advancement Match Rokkaku feat. Hyotei Gakuen (2006)

MUSICAL DEAR BOYS (as Osamu Igarashi)

- Musical Dear Boys (2007)
- Musical Dear Boys – VS East Honmoku (2008)

Rock Musical BLEACH (as Renji Abarai)

- Rock Musical BLEACH (scheduled for July 2011)

== See also ==
- Tenimyu
- The Prince of Tennis Movie
- The Place Promised in Our Early Days
- The Prince of Tennis
- Kaoru Kaidoh
