= Maya da Costa =

Canadian actor and dancer

- Born: 2005 or 2006 (age 20–21)
- Occupations: Actor; Dancer

Maya da Costa (born 2005 or 2006) is a Canadian actress and dancer of Portuguese and Vietnamese descent. She is known for starring as Coley in Girls Like Girls, a 2026 American coming-of-age romantic drama film directed by Hayley Kiyoko.

== Career ==
Da Costa trained in acting and dance, including at Harbour Dance Centre's Intensive Training Program.

Da Costa had a recurring role as Maya Longette in the Hulu limited series Under the Bridge in 2024.

Da Costa made her feature-film debut as Coley in Girls Like Girls, which was released in the United States on June 19, 2026.

In interviews, da Costa discussed preparing for the emotional scenes in Girls Like Girls, portraying first love and identity through the character of Coley, and the importance of queer representation in the film.

Da Costa was also cast in Aaron Sorkin's film The Social Reckoning.

In July 2026, Deadline Hollywood reported that da Costa had joined the cast of the next Paranormal Activity film, directed by Ian Tuason and scheduled for release in May 2027.

== Reception ==
Several critics discussed da Costa's lead performance in Girls Like Girls. Reviewing the film for TheWrap, William Bibbiani described da Costa's work as a breakout performance in her big-screen debut as Coley. Writing for Variety, Guy Lodge called her performance "wonderful", noting that it conveyed Coley's depth of feeling while allowing the character moments of silliness and petulance. Jourdain Searles of RogerEbert.com described da Costa's performance as refreshingly authentic. In the Los Angeles Times, Robert Abele described da Costa as an appealing newcomer and wrote that she realized Coley's journey with unforced naturalism. Emma Madden of The Guardian, while critical of the film, wrote that Molloy and da Costa's performances exceeded the script.
