= Ian Tuason =

Canadian director

- Born: Montreal, Quebec, Canada
- Occupations: Filmmaker; author
- Years active: 2009–present
- Notable work: Undertone
- Website: iantuason.com

Ian Tuason is a Canadian filmmaker and author. He is known for writing and directing the horror film Undertone (2025).

== Life and Career ==
Ian Tuason was born in Montreal, Quebec, Canada and started his career directing a number of short films in the 2010s, but was forced to put his career on hold for a time in the early 2020s to care for his parents after they were both diagnosed with cancer. The original concept for Undertone began as a radio play before being turned into a film screenplay that incorporated some of his own experiences during this era, using the unconventional narrative technique of conveying horror themes entirely through sound design.

In 2025, Tuason made his directorial debut with the horror film Undertone, which premiered on July 27, 2025 at the 29th Fantasia International Film Festival, where it won the gold audience award for Canadian films. It was released in the United States on March 13, 2026 by A24.

On December 12, 2025, it was announced that Tuason would write and direct the horror film Paranormal Activity, a reboot and the eighth installment in the Paranormal Activity franchise. Jason Blum, James Wan and Oren Peli will serve as producers through their Blumhouse Atomic, Solana Films banners, respectively, alongside Room 101, Inc. The film is scheduled to be released on October 22, 2027 by Paramount Pictures.

On April 9, 2026, it was announced that Tuason is developing a prequel film to Undertone for A24. It will be the second installment in a planned trilogy.

== Filmography ==
Short film

Year	Title	Director	Writer	Producer
2009	Continuity Problems	Yes	Yes	No
2011	Pirates Are Bad People	Yes	Yes	Executive
2011	Extreme Close Up	Yes	Yes	Yes
2014	Erased	Yes	Yes	Yes
2016	The Closet	Yes	Yes	No
2018	The Occurrence on Hollow Road	Yes	Yes	Yes

Feature film

Year	Title	Director	Writer	Producer
2025	Undertone	Yes	Yes	Executive
2027	Paranormal Activity	Yes	Yes	No

== Bibliography ==
- Everyone and No One (2022)
- Five Deadly Rebels: Volume 1 (2023)
- Five Deadly Rebels: Volume 2 (2023)
- Five Deadly Rebels: Volume 3 (2023)
- Five Deadly Rebels: Volume 4 (2023)
- Five Deadly Rebels: Volume 5 (2023)
