= Girls Like Girls (film) =

2026 film by Hayley Kiyoko

- Theatrical release poster
- Directed by: Hayley Kiyoko
- Screenplay by: Hayley Kiyoko; Stefanie Scott
- Story by: Hayley Kiyoko; Chloe Okuno
- Based on: Girls Like Girls by Hayley Kiyoko
- Produced by: Marc Platt; Katie McNicol; Adam Siegel; Dee Best; Michael Phillip; Jason Moring; Richard Alan Reid
- Starring: Maya da Costa; Myra Molloy; Levon Hawke; Zach Braff
- Cinematography: Sonja Tsypin
- Edited by: Christine Armstrong; Sabine Hoffman
- Music by: Jessica Rose Weiss
- Production company: Marc Platt Productions
- Distributed by: Focus Features
- Release dates: June 9, 2026 (Coolidge Corner Theatre); June 19, 2026 (United States)
- Running time: 95 minutes
- Country: United States
- Language: English
- Box office: $2.8 million

Girls Like Girls is a 2026 American coming-of-age romantic drama film directed by Hayley Kiyoko, based on her 2023 book of the same name. The film stars Maya da Costa, Myra Molloy, Levon Hawke, and Zach Braff.

Girls Like Girls was released in the United States on June 19, 2026. The film received positive reviews from critics.

== Premise and Background ==
Set during the summer of 2006, the story centers on Coley (Maya da Costa), who moves to a small Oregon town to live with her estranged father Curtis (Zach Braff) after losing her mother. She grows close to Sonya (Myra Molloy), leading to complicated feelings, self-doubt, and emotional growth.

== Plot ==
In the summer of 2006, 17-year-old Coley has moved to rural Oregon to live with Curtis, her estranged father. At a restaurant, a local girl named Sonya invites her to sit with her and her friends, including Alex, a boy who comments that he thinks Coley's cute; Trenton, Sonya's casual boyfriend; and SJ. The group goes to a local lake, where Trenton throws Coley into the water in spite of her protests. Sonya catches Coley before she leaves, and the two argue over Sonya not stopping Trenton. Eventually, Sonya apologizes, and she gives Coley her AIM ID.

The next day, the two girls shoplift alcohol and go to Sonya's house. Sonya tells Coley about her experiences as a competitive dancer and performs a routine for her, before Coley jokingly dances herself. Sonya begins to vomit in the bathroom, citing the alcohol. The girls continue to spend time together, and a close friendship forms as Trenton becomes increasingly more possessive of Sonya and hostile towards Coley. Sonya leads Coley to her "secret spot" by the railroad tracks, where Coley reveals that Curtis left her and her mother when she was little, and that the reason she lives with him now is because her mother died by suicide. As Sonya comforts Coley, the two passionately kiss and fall asleep in each other's arms. When they wake up, Sonya abruptly hurries home, and ignores Coley's AIM messages.

At a party, Coley learns that Sonya is leaving for an intensive dance camp. Coley asks Sonya if they'll talk while she's gone, to which Sonya replies that she won't have time and that she can't handle Coley. She immediately apologizes and leads Coley to a bedroom, where the two dance together and almost kiss. They're interrupted by Trenton, whom Sonya leaves with. Coley catches the two making out, much to her dismay. She shares a drink with Alex, abruptly kissing him and then crying. He offers his condolences on her mother's death, implying that Sonya gossiped about it.

The next day, Coley confronts Sonya about their attraction to each other. Sonya denies having feelings for her, claiming that she's similarly affectionate with all of her friends. Heartbroken, Coley falls into a depression. She befriends Blake, a convenience store cashier, who invites Coley to her house to smoke marijuana. The two have sex, with Coley impassive and imagining Blake as Sonya.

When Coley returns home the next morning, Curtis says he was worried about not knowing where she's been. Coley claims that he doesn't care about her, citing his absence in her childhood. Curtis reveals that Coley's mother was the one who left him and that he wanted to stay with the two of them. Later, Coley opens up to him about feeling unwanted by everyone; including her mother, implying that she blames herself for her death. Curtis denies these assertions and the two agree to start over. They spend more time together as the summer goes on, bonding over old family photographs.

Coley gets a job at a local restaurant and runs into Sonya while working. Sonya tells Coley that she does have feelings for her, but that she's not ready to be open about them. A few days later, SJ runs into Coley at the lake. She tells Coley that Sonya privately told her about her mother's death to seek advice on how to best support Coley, and that Trenton overheard and told everyone else. She then invites Coley to a party at her house. There, Coley overhears Sonya breaking up with Trenton. Sonya sits alone by the pool, and when Coley approaches she tells her she's tired of running. Coley tells her that she could stop, and Sonya agrees. In a post-credits scene, Sonya stops Coley on her way home and the two kiss in the street.

== Cast ==
- Maya da Costa as Coley
- Myra Molloy as Sonya
- Levon Hawke as Trenton
- Zach Braff as Curtis
- Alozie LaRose as Alex
- Sierra Sidwell as SJ
- Hunter Dillon as Goose
- Sophia Carriere as Brooke
- Alexa Mareka as Blake
- Maya Ford as Tracy
- Remy Marthaller as Emma
- Kareem Malcolm as Kendrick
- Olly Atkins as Tye

== Production ==
On May 30, 2023, Kiyoko released her first novel, Girls Like Girls, an adaptation of her 2015 single "Girls Like Girls"; she also co-directed the music video with Austin S. Winchell. In May 2022, she discussed a desire to turn the story of the song into a feature-length film. The film adaptation is written by Kiyoko and Stefanie Scott. It is produced by Focus Features. The cast is led by Myra Molloy and Maya da Costa.

Principal photography took place in Kelowna in British Columbia, Canada from July 3, 2024, to August 2, 2024, with Sonja Tsypin as the cinematographer.

Tsypin decided to keep the 2015 Girls Like Girls music video’s sun-drenched warmth and intimate camera, but the feature needed a wider palette and more contrast so the look could cover grief as well as first love.

With production designer Lindsey Moran and costume designer Kelli Dunsmore, Tsypin limited the design to “off-wheel” colors (for example periwinkle instead of purple, salmon instead of pink). The palette was planned as a sine wave with Coley’s arc: warm gold, peach, and lime, then jewel tones, cyan, and muted steel blue in the loss passages, then a return toward the opening hues. Colorist Ryan Croft graded the film with Tsypin. They aimed to get each scene as close as possible in camera to the intended look, while still leaving room for joy and vibrancy as the girls grow closer, and more weight and contrast in heartbreak. Warmth from the music video was applied selectively (red/salmon versus yellow/gold and warm lime) rather than as a wash; red was pushed into the low end and slightly into the midtones to take the edge off sunlit greenery without lowering saturation.

The film was shot on an Arri Alexa Mini LF with Canon K35 primes, some FD-X focal lengths, and one Arri Signature Prime used for a few moments that needed higher detail. Tsypin tested both cleaner modern glass and sets with more pronounced vintage artifacts. She chose the K35s for warmth, halation, highlight roll-off, and flares that avoided a sterile digital image and provided a sense of nostalgia, while keeping center sharpness on eyes and enough color for the shifting palette. Large format was used so intimate frames still felt slightly larger than life, matching how high the stakes feel to the teenagers, and so shallow depth of field could hold the audience on whatever Coley is locked onto. First AC Josh Crippen and Tsypin increased depth of field as Coley’s world opened, especially toward her father.

Budget pushed the lighting toward tungsten, which also matched the “hot” brief. Gaffer Rory Soderman and key grip Alex Simon built around Fresnel, PAR, ellipsoidal, and open-face tungsten fixtures. The remaining package supplemented those fixtures in cramped interiors and provided RGB capability. Interiors were lit from outside where possible so the floor stayed clear for blocking. Tsypin favored hard, directional light—often bare 20-kilowatt Fresnels—for geometry in the frame, for nostalgia, and to draw the eye to Sonya as Coley idolizes her; that quality also echoed the desert sun on exteriors. Coley’s bedroom was the hardest interior: an A-frame whose highest point was about five feet and which had glossy wood from floor to ceiling. Tungsten posed a fire hazard, while bouncing compact LEDs off the varnish produced crude reflections. Arri Orbiters with projection optics kept the fixtures cool and put a tightly controlled beam into the wood so the reflected light picked up the surface’s warmth without creating a broad specular highlight.

Jessica Rose Weiss composed the score for the film. Christine Armstrong and Sabine Hoffman edited the film.

== Release ==
Girls Like Girls premiered at the Coolidge Corner Theatre in Brookline, MA on June 9, 2026. It then premiered at the Universal Cinema AMC in Universal City, California on June 15. It was then screened at the Frameline Film Festival on June 18, being releasing in the United States the following day. In December 2024, it was announced that Focus Features had acquired worldwide rights to the film. The film is available to stream on Peacock exclusively beginning on August 14, 2026.

== Reception ==
On the review aggregator website Rotten Tomatoes, 88% of 64 critics' reviews are positive, with an average rating of 6.9/10. The website's consensus reads: "Bracingly personal and finely acted, Hayley Kiyoko's Girls Like Girls is a gently moving tale of queer love that's elevated by striking visual flair." Metacritic, which uses a weighted average, assigned the film a score of 70 out of 100, based on 17 critics, indicating "generally favorable" reviews.

Alison Foreman of IndieWire gave the film a B− and wrote, "If Girls Like Girls gives queer cinephiles an excuse to kiss at the movies in 2026, then Coley and Sonya may have finally accomplished what they set out to do."
