= Myra Molloy =

Thai-American singer, actress

Myra Molloy มณีภัสสร มอลลอย
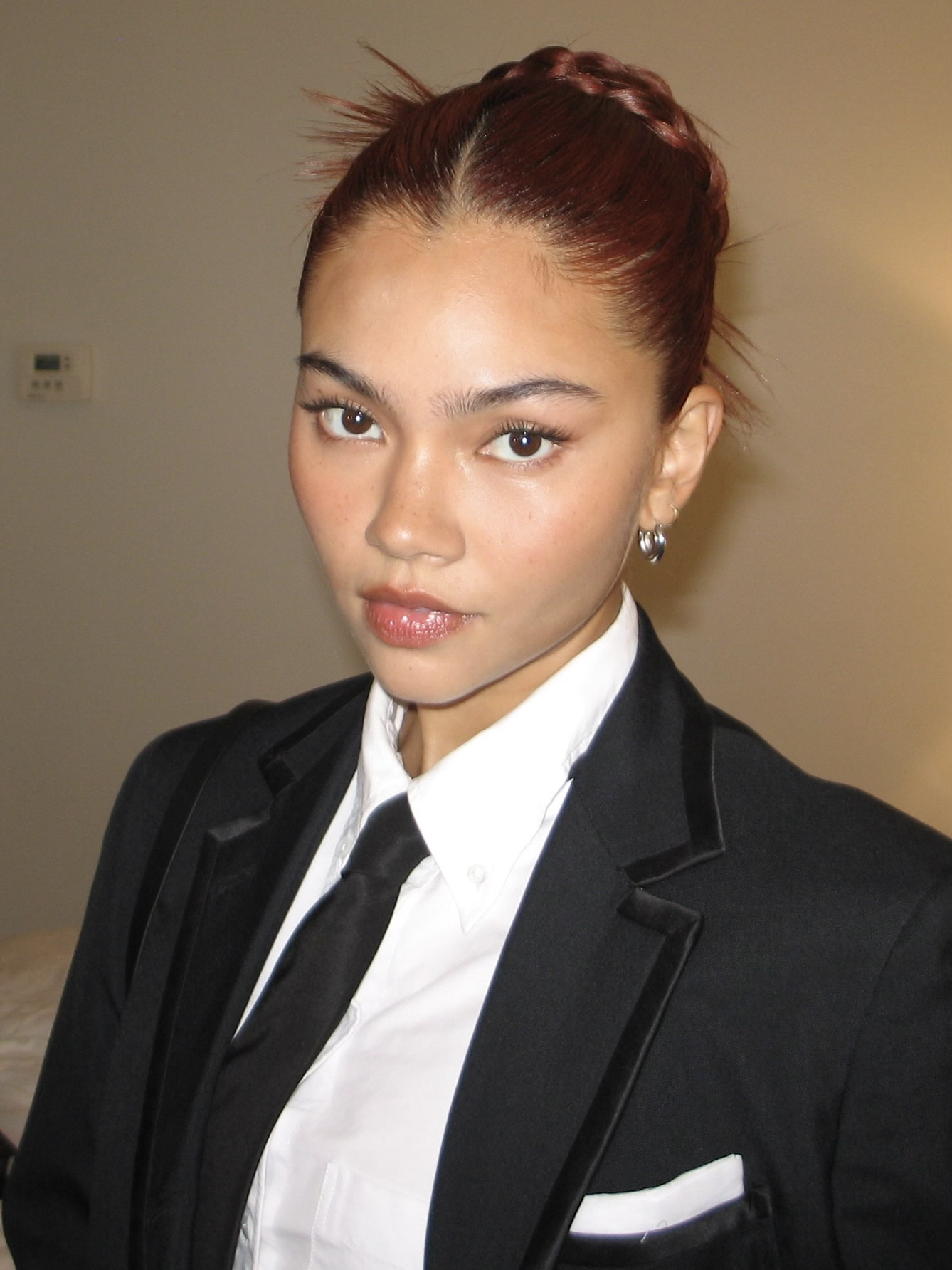
- Myra Molloy before the Girls Like Girls Premiere

Background information
- Born: Maneepat Myra Molloy; September 18, 1997 (age 29); Bangkok, Thailand
- Genres: Pop; classical crossover
- Occupations: Actress; Singer; Songwriter
- Website: Official website

Maneepat Myra Molloy (Thai: มณีภัสสร มอลลอย; RTGS: Maneepatsorn; born 18 September 1997), nicknamed Myra (ไมร่า), is a Thai-American actress, singer and songwriter. She is the winner of the first season of Thailand's Got Talent at age 13 and a Top 6 finalist on ABC's American spinoff of Rising Star. Molloy was the alternate for Kim in the 2018-2019 Broadway touring production of Miss Saigon. She made her Broadway debut as Eurydice in Hadestown on May 6, 2025. Molloy also appeared in the 2021 film He's All That and the 2026 film Girls Like Girls.

== Early life, education, and personal life ==
Molloy was born and raised in Bangkok, Thailand to a Thai mother and an American father. She has a younger sister, Nina. From an early age, Molloy made frequent trips to New York City. She was fascinated by The Phantom of the Opera, on more than one occasion standing through the entire performance with her $26 standing-room ticket. She still tries to attend every musical that she possibly can.

Molloy started playing violin when she was 5, later switching to the viola. She was a member of her school orchestra, as well as senior and chamber choirs. Molloy was the first vocal scholar at Shrewsbury International School Bangkok at age 9.

Beyond acting, Molloy is a professional music producer and engineer. A graduate of Berklee College of Music, she frequently contributes to the creative and musical direction of her international film and television projects. Molloy graduated summa cum laude from Berklee College of Music in Boston Massachusetts, majoring in singing and songwriting. She was a merit scholarship student.

== Career ==
In 2011, when Molloy was 13, she entered the first season of Thailand's Got Talent. In the competition, she sang "Time to Say Goodbye," "Think of Me," "Pie Jesu," and the Thai pop song "Star." The founder of Bangkok Grand Opera said he opened his new production company based on the increased interest in Western classical music as a direct result of Molloy’s performances.

Since winning the competition in 2011, Molloy has performed regularly with the Siam Sinfonietta Orchestra and Bangkok Opera. She regularly sings at major events including The Thai National Film Awards, The British Embassy Celebration of Queen Elizabeth II's birthday, The Asia-Pacific ICT Awards, numerous music festivals and concerts, and regularly at corporate events for major international companies including Rolls-Royce, Samsung, Johnson & Johnson, Shiseido, and many more.

Molloy has performed in Paris, China, Singapore, Thailand, and the United States singing in different languages including English, Thai, Chinese, German, French, Italian, Spanish, and Latin. She enjoys singing classical, pop, musical theatre, and jazz.

In 2012, she landed her first major theatrical role, the young Reya in Reya the Musical.

Molloy placed sixth in Season 1 of Rising Star USA on August 17, 2014, at age 16.

In 2016, Molloy played the character Wish in HBO Asia's original series Halfworlds II. She also co-wrote and performed several songs for the series.

In November 2016, Molloy performed the speaking and singing voice of the title character in the Thai version of the 2016 film Moana. In 2024, she reprised the role in its sequel.

Molloy was the alternate for Kim in the 2018–19 US Broadway Tour of Miss Saigon. She played Mara Chamberlain on the Freeform series The Bold Type and Quinn in the Netflix film He's All That.

On April 1, 2025, Myra was cast as Eurydice in the critically acclaimed musical Hadestown at the Walter Kerr Theatre in New York. Myra began her run on May 6, 2025. Molloy was the first Thai person cast to play a leading role in a Broadway musical.

In 2026, Molloy was cast as Sonya, one of the lead roles in Hayley Kiyoko's film Girls Like Girls. The film was released in June 2026.

In February 2026, Netflix announced that Molloy joined the cast of the mystery-thriller series Untamed (TV series) for its second season, playing Addy Hale, a recurring character.

=== Rising Star ===
Stage	Song	Original artist	Result
Audition Week 1	"Time to Say Goodbye"	Andrea Bocelli and Sarah Brightman	Safe (73% / 75%)
Duels Week 6	"Gravity" (vs. Morgan Higgins)	Sara Bareilles	Safe (66% / 66%)
Top 13 Week 7	"Stars"	Grace Potter and the Nocturnals	Safe (68% / 70%)
Top 8 Week 8	"Your Song"	Elton John	Saved (46% / 55%)
Top 6 Week 9	"Chandelier"	Sia	Eliminated (27% / 34%)

== Work ==
=== Movies and television ===
- The Winner Thailand's Got Talent (2011)
- Final 6 on ABC Network, USA Rising Star (2014)
- Moana (Thai version, voice role)(Disney, 2016)
- Halfworlds II, an HBO Asia original series (2016)
- The Bold Type (HULU, 2020)
- He's All That (Netflix, 2021)
- Moana 2 (Thai version, voice role) (Disney, 2024)
- Girls Like Girls (Focus Features, 2026)
- Untamed Season 2 (Netflix, 2026)

=== Theater and opera ===
- 2006 Molloy sang in the children's choir in the Bangkok Opera production of Ayodhya by Somtow Sucharitkul
- 2012 Molloy as Tiger in "A Boy and a Tiger" by Bruce Gaston at Impact Arena
- 2012 Molloy as the young Reya in Reya the Musical
- 2016 The 33 Gods, an opera by Somtow Sucharitkul
- 2016 Dracula, Blood is Life. Molloy played Lucy in the Bangkok theatrical production
- 2018-2019 Kim (alternate), Miss Saigon US national tour
- February 2025 – August 2025 Eurydice, Hadestown Broadway

=== Recordings ===
- 2011: Serment au Clair de Lune from the concert A Tout Jamais, a collection of H.M. The King of Thailand's songs translated into French.
- 2012: Why Can't I Dream from Reya The Musical
- 2014: Chandelier on Capitol Records, USA
- 2014: Your Song on Capitol Records, USA
- 2014: Stars on Capitol Records, USA
- 2014: Gravity on Capitol Records, USA
- 2014: Time to Say Goodbye on Capitol Records, USA
- 2015: Could It Be You on Chillin' Groove Records
- 2016: Blood Is Life on Ewing Entertainment
- 2016: How Far I'll Go (Moana Thai Original Motion Picture Soundtrack) on Walt Disney Records
- 2024: Beyond, Beyond (End Credit Version), Beyond (Reprise), We Know The Way, We’re Back, What Could Be Better Than This?, (Moana 2 Thai Original Motion Picture Soundtrack) on Walt Disney Records

== Awards ==
- 2014 Top 6 in America's ABC "Rising Star"
- 2011 Winner premier season Thailand's Got Talent
- 2008 First prize trophy from HRH The Thai Princess Future Park Junior Talent Award 2008
- 2008 Winner Dutchmill Kids Star Talent Contest 2008
- 2008 Winner Fairbairn Exhibition Scholarship (Shrewsbury International School)
- 2007 Winner Nescafe My Cup Fantasia 2
- 2006 Winner MIFA Singing Contest 2006 (at age 8)
