= Noriko Aoyama =

Japanese actress and model

- Born: 29 December 1978 (age 47); Chiba, Chiba, Japan
- Occupations: Model, actress
- Years active: 2002–present

Noriko Aoyama (青山倫子, Aoyama Noriko; born 29 December 1978) is a former model and a Japanese actress. She has appeared in more than 20 films since 2002.

== Selected filmography ==
Film
Year	Title	Role	Notes
2010	Paranormal Activity 2: Tokyo Night	Haruka Yamano	
2008	Legendary Assassin		
2022	The World with Maki		
2024	Anje Noir ( filming )	Saki	

TV
Year	Title	Role	Notes
2011	Full Throttle Girl		
2015	Kabukimono Keiji		
