= Paranormal Activity (2027 film) =

Upcoming film by Ian Tuason

- Directed by: Ian Tuason
- Written by: Ian Tuason
- Based on: Paranormal Activity by Oren Peli
- Produced by: Jason Blum; James Wan; Oren Peli
- Starring: Chase Yi; Sonia Mena; Maya da Costa
- Production companies: Blumhouse Atomic; Solana Films; Room 101, Inc.
- Distributed by: Paramount Pictures
- Release date: October 22, 2027
- Country: United States
- Language: English

Paranormal Activity is an upcoming American supernatural horror film written and directed by Ian Tuason. It is the eighth installment in the Paranormal Activity franchise. It stars Chase Yi, Sonia Mena, and Maya da Costa. Jason Blum, James Wan and Oren Peli serve as producers under their Blumhouse Atomic and Solana Films banners, respectively, alongside Room 101, Inc.

The film is scheduled to be released by Paramount Pictures in the United States on October 22, 2027.

== Cast ==
- Ari Millen
- Chase Yi
- Sonia Mena
- Drew Nelson as Self
- Maya da Costa
- Seled Calderon as Esther

== Production ==
In December 2025, a new installment in the Paranormal Activity franchise was reported to be in development. According to The Hollywood Reporter, the project marks a renewed effort by Paramount Pictures to continue the series following the release of Paranormal Activity: Next of Kin in 2021. The film was produced by James Wan, Jason Blum and Oren Peli, the creator of the original 2007 film. Paramount described the project as a "priority theatrical release". That same month, Ian Tuason signed on as director and writer. In June 2026, Chase Yi and Sonia Mena were cast in the lead roles. The next month, da Costa joined the cast.

Principal photography began in Toronto on July 13, 2026, and wrapped on August 26, under the working title Bavarian.

== Release ==
Paranormal Activity is scheduled to be released in the United States by Paramount Pictures on October 22, 2027. The film was previously scheduled to release on May 21, 2027.
