= Thailand's Got Talent =

Thai reality television series

- Also known as: ไทยแลนด์ก็อตทาเลนต์, TGT
- Created by: Simon Cowell
- Presented by: Krit Sripoomseth (2011-2012); Kathsepsawad Palakawong na Ayuthaya (2011-2018); Sudarat Butrprom (2013)
- Judges: Yo Pinyo (2011—2013); Benz Pornchita (2011—2015); Ning Nirut (2011); Joe Jirayut (2012—2013); Ben Chalatit (2014—2016); Kalamare(2014—2016); Dee Nitipong (2014—2016); Mam Kathaleeya (2016); Aof Pongsak (2018); Cris Horwang (2018); Jennifer Kim (2018); Tom Yuhtlerd (2018)
- Country of origin: Thailand
- No. of seasons: 7
- No. of episodes: 86

Production
- Production locations: Auditions: Various; Live shows: Workpoint Studio
- Running time: 60–120 minutes
- Production companies: Workpoint Entertainment (2011-2018); Fremantle Asia; Sony Music Thailand (2012-2016); Unilever Thailand (2012-2016); Motion Content Group

Original release
- Network: THAITV CH3 (2011-2016); Workpoint TV (2018)
- Release: 6 March 2011 – 12 November 2018

Thailand's Got Talent (Thai: ไทยแลนด์ก็อตทาเลนต์) (also known as TGT), is a Thai reality television series on the television network, and part of the global British Got Talent series. It is a talent show that features singers, dancers, sketch artists, comedians and other performers of all ages competing for the advertised top prize of 10,000,000 Baht (approximately $325,000). The show debuted in March 2011 with Thailand as the fifth country in Asia to license the Got Talent series. The most recent line-up of judges included Pongsak Rattanaphong, Cris Horwang, Jennifer Kim, and Yuhtlerd Sippapak alongside host Kathsepsawad Palakawong na Ayuthaya.

The winner of the first season was Myra Maneepatsorn Molloy, a 13-year-old singer who took home the first place prize of 10,000,000 Baht (approximately $325,000).

== Presenters and judges ==
=== Presenters ===
Presenter	1	2	3	4	5	6	7
Kathsepsawad Palakawong na Ayuthaya							
Sudarat Butrprom							
Krit Sripoomseth							

=== Judging ===
Judge	1	2	3	4	5	6	7
Pinyo Ruedhamma							
Pornchita na Songkhla							
Nirut Sirijanya							
Jirayut Watthanasin							
Chalatit Tantiwut							
Patcharasri Benjamas							
Nitipong Hornak							
Kathaleeya McIntosh							
Pongsak Rattanapong							
Cris Horwang							
Jennifer Kim							
Yuthlert Sippapak							

== Show format ==
Contestants must showcase their ability within 2–4 minutes. As the judges watch the performance, they may hit their buzzer (which lights up forms an X) if they aren't satisfied. With four Xs, an audition can immediately be stopped. Otherwise, the judges typically deliberate if a performer should go through.

In season 4, a new rule was introduced that required performers to receive at least 3 yes votes from the judges in order to move on to the next round.

== Season overview ==
=== Season 1 (2011) ===
The first season of Thailand's Got Talent premiered 6 March 2011 on THAITV CH3. The winner was Myra Maneepatsorn Molloy, a 13 year old singer who performed a combination of cross-over classical and Broadway songs.

=== Season 2 (2012) ===
The second season started on 3 June 2012. It was the first season without judge Nirut Sirijanya, who was replaced with radio personality Jirayut Watthanasin. The winner was aerial acrobat Leng Rajanikara Keawdee. Season 2 featured a major controversy.

=== Season 3 (2013) ===
The third season began 2 June 2013 and included an additional host, Sudarat Butrprom. There was also a scandal while this season was airing.

=== Season 4 (2014) ===
The fourth season ran from 15 June 2014 to 31 August 2014. Kathsepsawad Palakawong na Ayuthaya returned as the only host alongside new judges such as Chalatit Tantiwut, Patcharasri Benjamas, and Nitipong Hornak.

=== Season 5 (2015) ===
The fifth season started on 7 June 2015 and finished on 30 August 2015.

=== Season 6 (2016) ===
The sixth season began on 12 June 2016. Judge Pornchita na Songkhla was replaced by newcomer Kathaleeya McIntosh.

=== Season 7 (2018) ===
The seventh season premiered on 6 August 2018 on Workpoint TV. It featured an entirely new line-up of judges, such as Pongsak Rattanaphong, Cris Horwang, Jennifer Kim, and Yuhtlerd Sippapak.
