= Micah Sloat =

American actor

- Born: 1980 or 1981 (age 43–44); Westport, Connecticut, U.S.
- Occupation: Actor
- Years active: 2002–present

Micah Sloat (/ˈmiːkə/; born 1980 or 1981) is an American actor. He played Micah in the 2007 horror film Paranormal Activity and its 2010 sequel Paranormal Activity 2, and had a cameo in the spin-off film Paranormal Activity: The Marked Ones in 2014.

== Life and career ==
Sloat was born in Westport, Connecticut, as the oldest of six siblings. He obtained his bachelor's degree in Philosophy from Skidmore College in 2004.

Sloat plays both rock and blues on the guitar and also sings with the world champion Westminster barbershop chorus. In 2005, Sloat moved to Los Angeles and attended the Musicians Institute in Hollywood and began studying acting.

He was still taking classes when he noticed a casting advertisement for Paranormal Activity in the spring of 2006. The ad asked for unknown actors with the ability to improvise who could work during the night without knowing what the next scene would entail.

Released widely in 2009, Paranormal Activity proved to be an unexpected hit at the box office, grossing more than $190 million worldwide. He returned to the Paranormal Activity franchise in the film's prequel, and had a cameo appearance in the series' spin-off, Paranormal Activity: The Marked Ones, in 2014.

== Filmography ==
=== Film ===
Year	Title	Role	Notes
2007	Paranormal Activity	Micah	2010 Teen Choice Awards Nominated – Choice Movie Actor Horror/Thriller
2010	Paranormal Activity 2	Micah	
2014	Paranormal Activity: The Marked Ones	Micah	
2021	Unknown Dimension: The Story of Paranormal Activity	Himself	Documentary film

=== Other ===
Year	Title	Role	Notes
2024	Paranormal Activity: True Tales of Possession	Himself	Podcast
