= Undertone (film) =

2025 film by Ian Tuason

- Theatrical release poster
- Directed by: Ian Tuason
- Screenplay by: Ian Tuason
- Produced by: Dan Slater; Cody Calahan
- Starring: Nina Kiri; Adam DiMarco
- Cinematography: Graham Beasley
- Edited by: Sonny Atkins
- Music by: Shanika Lewis-Waddell
- Production companies: Black Fawn Films; Slaterverse Pictures; Spooky Pictures; DimensionGate; KINO Studios; Feel Everything
- Distributed by: A24 (through VVS Films)
- Release dates: July 27, 2025 (Fantasia); March 13, 2026 (United States)
- Running time: 94 minutes
- Country: Canada
- Language: English
- Budget: $500,000
- Box office: $21.6 million

Undertone (stylized in lowercase) is a 2025 Canadian supernatural horror film written and directed by Ian Tuason, in his directorial debut. The film stars Nina Kiri as Evy, a woman who hosts a paranormal podcast with her friend Justin (Adam DiMarco), where she is the skeptic to his believer. After Evy moves back home to become the caregiver to her dying mother (Michèle Duquet), she and Justin are sent recordings of a married couple (Keana Lyn Bastidas and Jeff Yung) experiencing paranormal noises in their home, drawing Evy into fear and paranoia.

Evy and her mother are the only characters shown on-screen in the film. All other characters are heard as off-screen voices, thus conveying the film's horror through its sound design. Undertone premiered at the Fantasia International Film Festival on July 27, 2025, and was theatrically released in the United States by A24 on March 13, 2026, and by VVS Films in Canada. The film received generally positive reviews from critics and was a box office success, grossing $21.6 million against a budget of $500,000.

== Plot ==
Evangeline "Evy" Babic is a young woman with a Catholic upbringing, living alone with her comatose mother, for whom she provides care. She and her friend Justin run The Undertone, a horror podcast where they report on supernatural occurrences, which Evy dismisses as hoaxes while Justin fully believes they are real. One day, Justin is sent an anonymous email containing a seemingly random string of letters and ten audio files, which they play on the podcast.

The files were recorded by a couple named Mike and Jessa, the latter of whom talks in her sleep, which Mike hopes to capture evidence of. In the first recording, Jessa sings "London Bridge" in her sleep, which Justin then plays backwards and insists he can hear her saying "Mike, kill all". This inspires Evy to research hidden messages in children's songs; she becomes disturbed when she discovers that playing "Baa, Baa, Black Sheep", her favorite childhood song, in reverse reveals the message "lick the blood off".

Evy later discovers that she is six weeks pregnant by her boyfriend, Darren. At her mother's bedside, Evy informs her of the pregnancy, but then confesses that she feels unfit to be a mother. She later schedules an appointment at a local women's clinic. Playing additional recordings from Mike and Jessa reveal Jessa speaking what at first sounds like gibberish, but when played backwards reveals "come in, Abyzou". Through research, Evy and Justin learn that Abyzou is a demon in Mediterranean and European folklore who was said to cause miscarriages and drive mothers to murder their own children out of jealousy, as she herself was infertile. Evy notices increasingly strange phenomena around her, such as her still-unconscious mother moving on her own, lights flickering, and a statue of the Virgin Mary that Evy placed in the closet reappearing in other parts of the house.

In the final recording, Jessa insists she has to "warn" someone who is "listening", presumably referring to Evy. Justin attempts to respond to the sender, only for the email to be automatically sent back to him. A caller claiming to be Mike and Jessa's neighbor reveals that the couple was found dead in their home with plastic bags over their heads and crayon drawings of babies all over their walls; the autopsy revealed that Jessa was pregnant at her time of death. Another caller demands to speak to "Mary"—the name Evy previously said she had always wanted to give her hypothetical child—and does not relent when Justin insists there is nobody there by that name. Another caller informs Justin and Evy that they should not have called out Abyzou or listened to all ten of the clips.

A final caller named Abby begs for help in calming her incessantly crying child, ultimately murdering the infant despite Evy and Justin pleading with her not to. Evy then confesses that her mother has died, which she feels inadvertently responsible for by refusing to pray for her. Evy rushes upstairs, where her walls are now covered in crayon drawings of Abyzou and dead, bloodied infants. She sees her mother standing in the bathroom and is seemingly attacked while screaming for her to stop, then utters "come in, Abyzou."

== Cast ==
- Nina Kiri as Evangeline "Evy" Babic
- Adam DiMarco as the voice of Justin Manuel
- Michèle Duquet as Mama
- Keana Lyn Bastidas as the voice of Jessa
- Jeff Yung as the voice of Mike
- Sarah Beaudin as the voice of Abby
- Brian Quintero as the voice of Dr. Ram

== Production ==
The film was inspired in part by Tuason caring for his parents in the early 2020s as they faced terminal cancer. It began as a radio play before evolving into a film screenplay that incorporated some of Tuason's own experiences, and was shot in his own childhood home. The film was shot in February 2025 with production taking place in Rexdale, a neighbourhood in Toronto, Canada. Tuason said, "I'm relying entirely on the audience to make that up in their own head. Because I thought about hiding stuff like Mike Flanagan does. But then I watched The Babadook, and I just saw a jacket hanging on an old rack, and I said, 'That's enough. I won't do anything. I'll just hang a jacket on a chair.'"

== Release ==
Undertone premiered at the 29th Fantasia International Film Festival on July 27, 2025, where it won the gold audience award for Canadian films. The film was also screened at the 2026 Sundance Film Festival. In August 2025, A24 acquired worldwide distribution rights to the film in a seven-figure deal, and it was released in the United States and Canada on March 13, 2026. Canadian distribution rights were acquired by VVS Films in January 2026. In March 2026, Vertigo Releasing and Rialto Distribution acquired the distribution rights for the United Kingdom and Australia, respectively, with the former releasing it in the United Kingdom on April 10, and the latter releasing it a day prior.

== Reception ==
=== Box office ===
Undertone has grossed $19.9 million in the United States and Canada and $1.4 million in other territories as of May 2026. In its opening weekend, it was released alongside Reminders of Him, and was projected to gross around $7 million from 2,500 theaters in its opening weekend. The film made $4.37 million on its first day, including $1.05 million from Thursday box office previews. It went on to overperform, grossing $9.34 million in the United States and Canada during its opening weekend. The film remained inside the top 10 for three weeks, grossing $3,015,003 in its second weekend and $1,651,762 in its third weekend. In its fourth weekend, it fell to number 13, grossing $379,248. The film expanded internationally in April 2026, with opening weekend grosses of $365,227 in the UK, $156,530 in Australia, and $17,452 in New Zealand.

=== Critical response ===
On the review aggregator website Rotten Tomatoes, 74% of 194 critics' reviews are positive, with an average rating of 6.8/10. The website's consensus reads: "Masterfully using negative space and unsettling audio to build its creeping dread, Undertone erupts as a diabolically immersive aural nightmare." Metacritic, which uses a weighted average, assigned the film a score of 64 out of 100, based on 32 critics, indicating "generally favorable" reviews. Audiences polled by CinemaScore gave the film an average grade of "C" on an A+ to F scale, while 41% surveyed by PostTrak said they would definitely recommend it.

John Nugent of Empire gave the film a score of 4/5 stars, writing, "While it may trade in somewhat unoriginal genre tropes — the haunted house, the evil demons, the creepy children's songs, the jump scares — its form and its function feel fresh, fluent and flippin' frightening. At the very least, it is a deeply unsettling sensory experience." The Observer's Wendy Ide wrote, "This chilling horror is further proof that all you need to create a terrifying film is an actor, a computer screen and some creatively unsettling sound design." The Irish Times's Tara Brady gave it a score of 3.5/5 stars. She noted the film's similarities to the 2020 horror film Relic, and said, "The real stars of this clever one-location set-up are sound designer David Gertsman and mixer Jon Lawless, a team who manage to wring a jump-scare out of a dripping tap. Kiri gives a layered performance that foregrounds the strain that eclipses grief for a long-time carer. The coda veers into the conceptual chaos of weaker, later Paranormal Activity instalments, but it's a promising start for the director's proposed trilogy."

Benjamin Lee of The Guardian gave the film 2/5 stars, saying it "has elements of Paranormal Activity, Session 9, Hereditary, The Ring, The Blair Witch Project and The Exorcist, enough sighs of familiarity to give horror fans a scary case of deja vu. It's not that total originality is expected at this particular moment... but given the genre's overcrowd, it's hard to see what pushes Undertone above the noise." Richard Lawson of The Hollywood Reporter said, "Undertone makes one yearn for an official moratorium on its many reappropriated tropes, so that aspiring horror directors might finally be once again inspired to find new scary stories to tell in novel ways."
