= Katie Featherston =

American actress (born 1982)

- Born: October 20, 1982 (age 44); Arlington, Texas, U.S.
- Education: Southern Methodist University (BFA)
- Occupation: Actress
- Years active: 2005–present

Katie Featherston (born October 20, 1982) is an American actress. She played Katie in the Paranormal Activity horror film series.

== Early life and career ==
Featherston was born and raised in Arlington, Texas, where she attended Bowie High School and participated in numerous drama activities. She went on to study acting at Southern Methodist University, graduating with a bachelor's degree of fine arts in 2005 before moving to Los Angeles.

She played Katie in the film Paranormal Activity, which was made in 2007 and released theatrically in the United States in 2009. She reprises her role in the film's sequels, including the spin-off Paranormal Activity: The Marked Ones, where she makes a cameo appearance.

== Filmography ==
=== Film ===
Year	Title	Role	Notes
2005	Private Lives	Shannon	
2005	The Scorekeeper	Sally	
2006	Mutation	Melissa	
2007	Paranormal Activity	Katie	Screamfest Horror Film Festival for Best Actress (2007); Nominated – MTV Movie Award for Best Frightened Performance (2010)
2007	The Distance from Here	Jenn	
2010	Psychic Experiment	Elspeth Thompson	
2010	Paranormal Activity 2	Katie	
2010	First Light	Cynthia	
2011	Paranormal Activity 3	Adult Katie	Cameo
2012	Paranormal Activity 4	Katie	
2013	The Newest Testament	Deborah	Short film
2014	Paranormal Activity: The Marked Ones	Katie	Cameo
2016	Becoming	Sarah	Short film Also director and producer
2019	The Lonely Host	Gloria	Short film
2019	In Search of Darkness	Herself	Documentary film
2020	In Search of Darkness: Part II	Herself	Documentary film
2021	Unknown Dimension: The Story of Paranormal Activity	Herself	Documentary film

=== Television ===
Year	Title	Role	Notes
2012	The River	Rosetta "Rabbit" Fischer	Recurring role; 3 episodes
2013	Act-Anon	Hope	Main role; 6 episodes Web series
2017	Solace for the Unloved	Mary Ellen	Main role; 20 episodes Short-form series Also director and producer
2019	Big Little Lies	Lilah LaPlant	Episode: "What Have They Done?"

=== Other ===
Year	Title	Role	Notes
2024	Paranormal Activity: True Tales of Possession	Herself	Podcast
