= Paranormal Activity =

2007 film by Oren Peli

- Theatrical release poster
- Directed by: Oren Peli
- Written by: Oren Peli
- Produced by: Jason Blum; Oren Peli
- Starring: Katie Featherston; Micah Sloat
- Cinematography: Oren Peli
- Edited by: Oren Peli
- Production companies: Solana Films; Blumhouse Productions
- Distributed by: Paramount Pictures
- Release dates: October 14, 2007 (Screamfest); September 25, 2009 (United States)
- Running time: 86 minutes
- Country: United States
- Language: English
- Budget: $15,000–$450,000
- Box office: $194.2 million

Paranormal Activity is a 2007 American supernatural horror film produced, written, directed, photographed, and edited by Oren Peli. It centers on a young couple (Katie Featherston and Micah Sloat) who are haunted by a supernatural presence inside their home. They then set up a camera to document what is haunting them. The film uses found-footage conventions that were mirrored in the later films of the series.

Originally developed by Peli as an independent feature and given film festival screenings in 2007, the film was shot for $15,000. It was then acquired by DreamWorks Pictures, then a Paramount Pictures subsidiary, who modified the film, particularly with a new ending that cost an additional $200,000. It was given a limited U.S. release on September 25, 2009, and then a nationwide release on October 16, 2009. The film earned nearly $108 million at the U.S. box office and a further $85 million internationally for a worldwide total of $194 million. Paramount would then solely acquire the U.S. rights for $350,000. It is often cited as the most profitable film ever made, based on proportionate return on investment, although such figures are difficult to verify independently as this is likely to exclude marketing costs.

The film is the first installment in the Paranormal Activity film series. A prequel, Paranormal Activity 2, was released in 2010.

== Plot ==
Katie drives up to a house in San Diego as her boyfriend and housemate Micah records her from the driveway using his new video camera. Katie claims that an evil presence has been haunting her since she was a child and suspects it may be responsible for strange happenings in their home, so Micah sets up the camera in their bedroom to record any paranormal activity that occurs while they sleep. Psychic Dr. Fredrichs visits the couple at Katie's request and after a conversation suggests that she is being haunted by a demon that feeds off of negative energy and is intent on tormenting her. He advises them not to communicate with the demon and recommends they contact a demonologist to handle matters, but Micah is dismissive of this advice and continues to film and provoke the presence over the next few weeks.

The camera captures many strange occurrences at night: minor noises, flickering lights, and door movements, soon escalating into loud thuds, violent door slamming, and demonic grunts and screeches. One night, Katie gets out of bed appearing to be in a trance, stands beside the bed staring at Micah for two hours, and then goes outdoors where Micah later finds her, none of which she recalls the next day.

Katie is increasingly irritated by Micah's flippant and dismissive behavior about the strange activity. Micah brings home a Ouija board against Katie's wishes. When the couple leaves the house for a night out, the camera records the board's planchette moving by itself before the board spontaneously catches fire. Katie pleads with Micah to contact a demonologist but he refuses and continues his efforts to document events. The couple wakes one night to find non-human footsteps in baby powder Micah sprinkled in the hallway; they lead to an open attic hatch. Micah discovers a burnt photograph in the attic which features a young Katie, though the photo was thought to have been destroyed in a house fire over a decade prior. After Katie finally reaches out to the demonologist and learns he is out of the country, psychic Dr. Fredrichs returns but is alarmed by the energy of the home and flees. The next night, Katie is pulled out of bed and tormented by an unseen force. The next morning, Micah photographs a bite mark on Katie's back, motivating him to prepare to get them out of the house, but Katie, now showing signs of a possession, abruptly changes her mind and insists that they stay.

On Night #21, Katie gets out of bed again in a trance and stares at Micah for hours before going downstairs. Shortly thereafter, she screams for Micah, who frantically rushes to help her. Loud thuds are heard downstairs and Micah screams in pain. A few minutes later, Micah's body is hurled at the camera and Katie is revealed standing in the doorway with blood on her shirt. She crawls to Micah's body and sniffs it, then looks up at the camera with a grin, lunging at the camera with a demonic snarl on her face before the scene cuts to black. The epilogue text states that Micah's body was discovered by the police days later, and Katie's whereabouts are unknown.

=== Various endings ===
Once DreamWorks/Paramount acquired the film, the original ending was shown at only one public viewing before being scrapped; two new endings were developed, one theatrically released above and the other available as an alternate ending on home releases.

==== Original ending ====
Katie returns to the bedroom alone, covered in blood and holding a large kitchen knife. She sits on the floor against the bed and rocks back and forth. The next day, a friend of hers leaves a concerned message at 2pm. At 9pm, she visits the house; meanwhile, Katie stops moving. When her friend discovers Micah's body downstairs and runs away in panic, Katie resumes rocking back and forth. Thirty minutes later, two police officers enter the house and reach the bedroom where they find the possessed Katie with the knife. She stands up, returns to her normal state and asks for Micah. After the attic door slams by itself, one of the officers panics and shoots and kills Katie. The camera fades to black as the police officers continue searching for the source of the slamming sound. An epilogue text appears, dedicating the film to the memory of Micah and Katie.

This ending was exclusively shown at the 2007 Screamfest Film Festival and was never released officially by Paramount or Blumhouse in any capacity, save for the documentary Unknown Dimension: The Story of Paranormal Activity (2021) in which a snippet of the ending was presented. Second Sight Films released a special edition Blu-ray of the film for the UK under license from its regional distributor Icon Productions, and included the full original ending as a special feature. The original cut of the film (dubbed the "Festival Cut") would later leak on various forums.

==== Alternate ending #1 ====
After killing Micah off-screen, Katie comes back upstairs alone holding a knife in her hand. She closes and locks the bedroom door, approaches the camera, and after smiling, she slits her throat before collapsing dead. The scene then fades to black.

== Cast ==
- Katie Featherston as a fictionalized version of herself
- Micah Sloat as a fictionalized version of himself
- Mark Fredrichs as Dr. Fredrichs
- Amber Armstrong as Katie's friend

Credits adapted from TV Guide.

== Production ==
Attempting to focus on believability rather than action and gore, Peli chose to shoot the picture with a home video camera. In deciding on a more raw and stationary format (the camera was almost always sitting on a tripod or something else) and eliminating the need for a camera crew, a "higher degree of plausibility" was created for the audience as they were "more invested in the story and the characters". Peli says that the dialogue was "natural" because there was no real script. Instead, the actors were given outlines of the story and situations to improvise, a technique known as "retroscripting" also used in the making of The Blair Witch Project. In casting the movie, Peli auditioned "a few hundred people" before finally meeting Katie Featherston and Micah Sloat. He originally auditioned them individually and later called them back to audition together. Peli was impressed with the chemistry between the actors, saying, "If you saw the [audition] footage, you would've thought they had known each other for years." During a guest appearance on The Jay Leno Show on November 3, 2009, Sloat and Featherston explained they each saw the casting call on LACasting. Featherston noted they were originally paid $500 for their work.

Principal photography took place at a private residence in Rancho Peñasquitos, San Diego. The film was shot out of sequence due to Peli's self-imposed seven-day shooting schedule. Sloat, who controlled the camera for a good deal of the film, was a former cameraman at his university's TV station. "It was a very intense week," Peli said, stating that the film was shot day and night, edited at the same time, and had visual effects applied as the acting footage was being finalized. Multiple endings were conceived, but not all of them were shot, and the final publicly released ending added by the studio after rights to the film were obtained.

The film was screened at 2007's Screamfest Horror Film Festival, where it impressed Kirill Baru, an assistant at the Creative Artists Agency, to the extent that CAA soon signed on to represent Peli. Attempting to find a distributor for the film and/or directing work for Peli, the agency sent DVDs of the movie to as many people in the industry as they could, and it was eventually seen by Miramax Films Senior Executive Jason Blum, who thought it had potential. He worked with Peli to re-edit the film and submitted it to the Sundance Film Festival, but it was rejected. The DVD also impressed DreamWorks executives Adam Goodman, Stacey Snider, and finally Steven Spielberg, who cut a deal with Blum and Peli.

DreamWorks' plan was to remake the film with a bigger budget and with Peli directing, and only to include the original version as an extra when the DVD was eventually released. "They didn't know what to do with [the original]", said Blum; they just wanted to be "in business" with Peli. Blum and Peli agreed, but stipulated a test screening of the original film before going ahead with the remake, believing it would be well received by a theatrical audience.

During the screening, people began walking out and Goodman thought the film was bombing, until he learned that the viewers were actually leaving because they were so frightened. He then realized a remake would be unwise and unnecessary. Paramount Pictures, which acquired DreamWorks in 2005, bought the domestic rights to the film, and worldwide rights to any sequels, for US$350,000. When the film was taken in by Paramount, several changes were made. Some scenes were cut, others added, and the original ending was scrapped, with two new endings being shot. The ending shown in theaters during the film's worldwide release is the only one of the three to feature visual effects, and it differs from the endings previously seen at the Screamfest and Burbank screenings. The theatrical release was delayed while Paramount initially put all DreamWorks productions on hold; however, a screening for international buyers resulted in the sale of international rights in 52 countries. Only after Goodman became production chief at Paramount in June 2009 did the film finally get slated for a Fall release.

== Release ==
Paranormal Activity premiered at Screamfest Horror Film Festival in North America on October 14, 2007, was shown at the Slamdance Film Festival on January 18, 2008, and screened at the 36th Annual Telluride Film Festival on September 6, 2009.

The version with the new ending made after Paramount acquired the film was screened on September 25, 2009, in twelve college towns across the United States; the venues included Boulder, Colorado; Columbus, Ohio; Madison, Wisconsin; and Seattle, Washington. Eleven of the twelve venues sold out with State College, Pennsylvania being the only exception due to a Penn State football game that was held the same night. On September 28, Paramount issued a press release on Peli's website, announcing openings in 20 other markets on October 2, including larger market cities such as New York and Chicago.

On October 3, it was reported that a total of 33 screenings in all 20 markets had sold out and that the film had earned $500,000 domestically. A day later, Paramount announced that the film would have a full limited release in 40 markets, playing at all hours (including after-midnight showings). On October 6, Paramount announced that the movie would be released nationwide if the film received one million "demands" on Eventful. The full limited release of the film started on October 9. On October 10, the Eventful.com counter hit over one million requests. Paramount announced soon after that the film would get a wide domestic release on October 16 and expand to more theaters on October 23. By November, it was showing in theaters worldwide.

=== Marketing ===
Initial trailers featured clips of audiences reacting to scenes in the film. In these trailers, a night-vision camera mounted in a movie theater showed a montage of movie-goers screaming and jumping after being scared. On his website, director Oren Peli invited internet users to "demand" where the film went next by voting on Eventful. This was the first time a major motion picture studio used the service to virally market a film. In addition to the "Demand It!" campaign, allowing fans to bring the film to their local movie theater, there was also a "TweetYourScream" campaign on Twitter, resulting in many videos of audience reactions becoming popular.

=== Home media ===
Paranormal Activity was not released on DVD or Blu-ray until December 29, 2009, more than two years after the film was made. The home release includes one alternate ending to the theatrical version. It was released in the United Kingdom on March 22, 2010, on DVD and Blu-ray with some specials. In the Netherlands, the movie received a release on VHS in 2010. The film grossed $22.1 million in home sales.

Additionally, at the end of the film, 15 minutes worth of names were added to some editions of the DVD release, as part of a special promotion. A notice was sent to fans that had clicked the "Demand It" button for their theater asking permission to include their name in the credits. Within 24 hours, Paramount received more 170,000 submissions of fans who wished for their names to be included. The message that popped up before this said: "The fans who "demanded" the film were asked by email if they wanted to have their name appear as a thank you for the film's success". In January 2012, the first three films in the series were edited in chronological order and released as a single film on digital platforms under the title Paranormal Activity: The Chronology.

== Reception ==
=== Box office ===
The film opened on September 25, 2009, to twelve theaters and took $36,146 on its opening day and $77,873 on its first weekend for an average of $6,489 per venue. It had more success when it opened to 33 theaters on October 1, 2009, doubling the box-office reception, grossing $532,242 for an average of $16,129 per venue, bringing the 10-day total to $776,763.

As it expanded to 160 theaters on the October 9–11 weekend, the film grossed $2.7 million on that Friday, having a per-theater average of $16,621. It went on to gross $7.9 million. Over the weekend, the film reached the week's highest per-theater average of $49,379, coming in at fourth for the weekend, behind Couples Retreat, Zombieland, and Cloudy with a Chance of Meatballs. Over the weekend of October 16, 2009, Paranormal Activity expanded to 600 more theaters, grossing $19.6 million with $25,813 per theater average gross, and bringing the total gross to $33.2 million. On the weekend of October 23, 2009, Paranormal Activity rose to first, beating out Saw VI, earning $21,104,070, expanding to 1,945 theaters for an average of $10,850 per theater, compared with the $14.1 million gross from 3,036 theaters, and $4,650 average for Saw VI. The film went on to gross $107.9 million domestically and $86.3 million in foreign markets, with a total gross of $194.2 million. The Hollywood Reporter estimated the film made a net profit of $78 million.

=== Critical response ===
On review aggregator Rotten Tomatoes, the film has an overall approval rating of 82% based on 209 reviews, with an average rating of 7.2/10. The website's critical consensus reads, "Using its low-budget effects and mockumentary method to great result, Paranormal Activity turns a simple haunted house story into 90 minutes of relentless suspense." On Metacritic, the film has a weighted average score of 68 out of 100 based on 24 critics, indicating "generally favorable reviews".

Film critics James Berardinelli and Roger Ebert each awarded it 3.5 stars out of a maximum of 4 stars. Ebert stated in his review, "It illustrates one of my favorite points, that silence and waiting can be more entertaining than frantic fast-cutting and berserk f/x. For extended periods here, nothing at all is happening, and believe me, you won't be bored." Entertainment Weekly critic Owen Gleiberman gave Paranormal Activity an A− rating and called it "frightening...freaky and terrifying" and said that "Paranormal Activity scrapes away 30 years of encrusted nightmare clichés." Bloody Disgusting ranked the film 16th in their list of the "Top 20 Horror Films of the Decade", with the article saying, "Peli deserves props for milking the maximum amount of tension out of the spare, modern setting—an ordinary, cookie-cutter tract home in San Diego. It doesn't sound very scary, but Peli manages to make it terrifying. If you aren't white-knuckling your armrest at least once or twice while watching it, you probably don't have a pulse."

However, some critics disliked the film. Michael Carter of The Breeze summed up the film as "alright", though denouncing its reliance on "cheap jump scares and an even cheaper 'found footage' style". David Stratton of the Australian television series At the Movies said that "it was extremely unthrilling, very obvious, very clichéd. We've seen it all before." Marc Savlov of The Austin Chronicle called it "an excruciatingly tedious YouTube gag cleverly marketed to go viral". Bill Gibron of PopMatters listed the film as the second worst horror film of all time, writing that it lacked "anything remotely redeeming for the seasoned fright fan", and was "a waste of time in both concept and execution".

=== Accolades ===
The film was nominated for Best First Feature in the Independent Spirit Awards 2009.

== Legacy ==
The monetary success of Paranormal Activity compared to its budget made it the most profitable film of all time, surpassing The Blair Witch Project (1999). The film's low budget and easy to replicate style directly led to found footage becoming a horror movie trend for years, with The Last Exorcism, Apollo 18, The Devil Inside, and the V/H/S series arriving in its wake.

The film's marketing strategy inspired subsequent horror films to use similar methods. Audience reaction movie trailers were used to advertise films The Woman in Black and World War Z.

Mockbuster group The Asylum created their take on the film, titled Paranormal Entity, which would later spawn a series of its own. In Japan, a sequel entitled Paranormal Activity 2: Tokyo Night was released in 2010. On March 7, 2010, Alec Baldwin and Steve Martin performed a spoof of the film as part of the 82nd Academy Awards. A Haunted House, a parody film, was released in 2013.

=== Media tie-ins ===
In December 2009, a short digital comic entitled Paranormal Activity: The Search for Katie was released for the iPhone. It was written by Scott Lobdell and features art from Mark Badger.

A video game called Paranormal Activity: The Lost Soul was released by VRWerx for the Oculus Rift, HTC Vive and PlayStation 4. The PlayStation 4 version can be played in both PlayStation VR and regular mode.

== Sequels, prequel and reboots ==
A parallel sequel and prequel, Paranormal Activity 2, was released in 2010. The success of the first two films would spawn additional films in the series: the prequel Paranormal Activity 3 in 2011, and Paranormal Activity 4 (the sequel to the second installment) in 2012. The fifth installment and spin-off, The Marked Ones, was released in 2014, and the sixth installment, The Ghost Dimension, was released in 2015. A seventh mainline installment, titled Next of Kin, which served as a reboot, was released in October 2021 to the Paramount+ streaming service. An eighth installment and a second reboot simply titled, Paranormal Activity, is currently being filmed with a release date May 21, 2027.

In Japan, a sequel/spin-off "not-official" to the first film was released in 2010, titled Paranormal Activity: Tokyo Night.

== See also ==
- List of media set in San Diego
