= Oren Peli =

Israeli filmmaker

- אורן פלי
- Born: January 21, 1970 (age 56); Ramat Gan, Israel
- Occupations: Film director, producer, screenwriter
- Years active: 2007–present
- Known for: Paranormal Activity

Oren Peli (Hebrew: אורן פלאי / אורן פלי; born January 21, 1970) is an Israeli filmmaker, best known for writing and directing the 2007 horror film Paranormal Activity. He acted as producer on subsequent films in the franchise, as well as on the first five films in the Insidious franchise.

== Early life ==
Peli was born in Ramat Gan, Israel, to a Jewish family. At the age of 19, he moved to the United States.

== Career ==
Peli began as a computer software programmer, and was one of the developers behind Photon Paint, a bitmap graphics program for the Amiga. He is also credited for developing the networking code for the home console versions of Mortal Kombat 3, during his work at Sculptured Software.

His first film Paranormal Activity was inspired by Peli moving into his first house alone and without family nearby. Peli heard creaks and knocks in the night, which laid the groundwork for a film about a family running around with cameras trying to catch what was going on in the house.

After the success of Paranormal Activity, Peli worked with James Wan and Leigh Whannell to develop Insidious. Peli also produced and wrote the 2012 horror film Chernobyl Diaries, based on the Chernobyl disaster and on his story The Diary of Lawson Oxford. The film followed "a group of friends who, while vacationing in Europe, find themselves stranded in the abandoned city of Prypiat, Ukraine only to discover that they are not alone."

=== Television ===
In 2012, The River premiered on ABC, a paranormal/action/horror television series about a group of people on a mission to find a missing TV explorer in the Amazon. Peli co-created the show with Michael R. Perry, who co-wrote Paranormal Activity 2.

=== Films ===
Peli is writer and director of Area 51, a story about three friends who want to discover the secrets of the fabled Area 51. Peli is also the producer of all films in the Paranormal Activity & Insidious franchises and The Lords of Salem.

== Filmography ==
Year	Film	Director	Producer	Writer	Notes
2007	Paranormal Activity	Yes	Yes	Yes	Also cinematographer and editor
2010	Insidious	No	Yes	No	
2010	Paranormal Activity 2	No	Yes	No	
2011	Paranormal Activity 3	No	Yes	No	
2012	The River	No	Executive	Story	Creator and executive producer (8 episodes) Story for episode: "Magus"
2012	Chernobyl Diaries	No	Yes	Yes	
2012	The Lords of Salem	No	Yes	No	
2012	The Bay	No	Yes	No	
2012	Paranormal Activity 4	No	Yes	No	
2013	Insidious: Chapter 2	No	Yes	No	
2014	Paranormal Activity: The Marked Ones	No	Yes	No	
2015	Area 51	Yes	Executive	Yes	Also cinematographer
2015	Insidious: Chapter 3	No	Yes	No	
2015	Paranormal Activity: The Ghost Dimension	No	Yes	No	
2018	Insidious: The Last Key	No	Yes	No	
2021	Paranormal Activity: Next of Kin	No	Yes	No	
2023	Insidious: The Red Door	No	Yes	No	
2026	Insidious: Out of the Further	No	Yes	No	
2027	Paranormal Activity	No	Yes	No	

== Actor ==
- Unknown Dimension: The Story of Paranormal Activity (2021) (Documentary film, himself)

== Video games ==
- 1994: WWF Raw (programmer)
- 1998: NFL Xtreme (programmer)
- 2019: Night Terrors: Bloody Mary (executive producer)
