= Marquise Vilsón =

American actor

Marquise Vilsón (born 1981) is an American actor and activist. A veteran of the Ballroom community in New York, Vilsón's first acting role was in 2016 and was followed by appearances in the television series A League of Their Own and Tom Swift (both 2022) and the documentaries No Ordinary Man and Disclosure (both 2020). Vilsón is one of the subjects of the 2005 documentary The Aggressives (2005), which covers his personal experiences as a Black and masculine-presenting youth in New York from 1997 to 2001.

== Life and career ==
=== Early life ===
A native New Yorker, Vilsón was born in 1981 and grew up in the Bronx in poverty. He was brought up during the HIV/AIDS pandemic and crack epidemic, and at seven years old, he attended the funeral of his father, who was murdered at 29 years old. A transgender man, he came out as trans to his family and stopped going to school at 16 years old. He mostly discovered white trans forebears, but also looked up to men such as Willmer Broadnax and Reno Prestige Wright, the latter of whom is involved in the Ballroom community in New York and whom Vilsón referred to as "a living legend." One impactful media depiction of trans people in particular was an episode of the Jerry Springer show titled "My boyfriend is a girl", which Vilsón recalls: "... it was the first time, clearly, that I was seeing somebody Black and transmasculine on television".

=== Ballroom scene and activism ===
Starting in 1995, Vilsón participated and performed in the Ballroom scene, after he was introduced to the scene by a youth mentor who was a member of the ball house named the House of Chanel. He began participating in the Latex Balls hosted by the New York–based organization Gay Men's Health Crisis in 1996 and joined the House of Balenciaga. He also served in the military shortly after the September 11 attacks in 2001.

Vilsón agreed to be filmed from 1997 to 2001 by director Daniel Peddle for his 2005 documentary The Aggressives, which focuses on six young, Black and Brown masculine-presenting and -identifying people in New York City. The film depicts Vilsón's progress in starting medical care for his gender transition and later joining the military, after which he disappears. Academics Chase Joynt and Morgan M. Page analyze, in their book Boys Don't Cry, that the film "struggles to reconcile [Vilsón's choice to access medical transition] with its project of depicting butchness, ultimately abandoning his storyline midway through". Peddle directed a sequel to the 2005 film, Beyond the Aggressives: 25 Years Later, which features many of the subjects of the previous film, but Vilsón did not make an appearance.

Around this period, Vilsón became involved in activism and worked as a sexual health coordinator for Safe Horizon's Streetwork Project.

=== Acting career ===
Vilsón first started acting in 2016, with a role in a web series. His next role was a part in the Off-Broadway production of the play Charm, after which he began considering acting as his career, and then a role in Ben Is Back (2018) with Julia Roberts. In a 2018 episode of Law & Order: Special Victims Unit, Vilsón played the role of a military sergeant who reluctantly gives witness testimony about his identity as a transgender man in a court case. Vilsón and Garcia made an appearance in Netflix's 2019 series Tales of the City, during a year in which, according to scholar Tre'vell Anderson, there was a "shift" in trans visibility as trans men were cast into higher-profile roles.

In the 2020 documentary on transgender jazz musician Billy Tipton, titled No Ordinary Man, Vilsón features with academics Stephan Pennington, C. Riley Snorton, and Susan Stryker, and artist Zackary Drucker, among other trans public figures. CBC Music described the film as "a moving and vulnerable portrayal". He was also in the 2020 documentary Disclosure, which discusses depictions of transgender people in American media.

Vilsón starred in the 2022 television shows A League of Their Own and Tom Swift, for Amazon Prime Video and the CW, respectively. He noted that, in the latter series, he had worked with two writers who were trans people of color, which stood out from his previous experiences.

== Filmography ==
=== Film ===
Year	Title	Role	Notes
2005	The Aggressives	Self	Documentary film; footage recorded from 1997 to 2001
2018	Ben Is Back		
2020	No Ordinary Man	Self	Documentary film
2020	Disclosure	Self	Documentary film
2021	B-Boy Blues		
2024	The Lost Holliday		

=== Television ===
Year	Title	Role	Notes
2018	Law & Order: Special Victims Unit	Jim Preston	Episode: "Service"
2019	Tales of the City		
2022	A League of Their Own	Red Wright	
2022	Tom Swift	Isaac Vega	
