= Anh Vo =

Vietnamese-American dancer (born 1995)

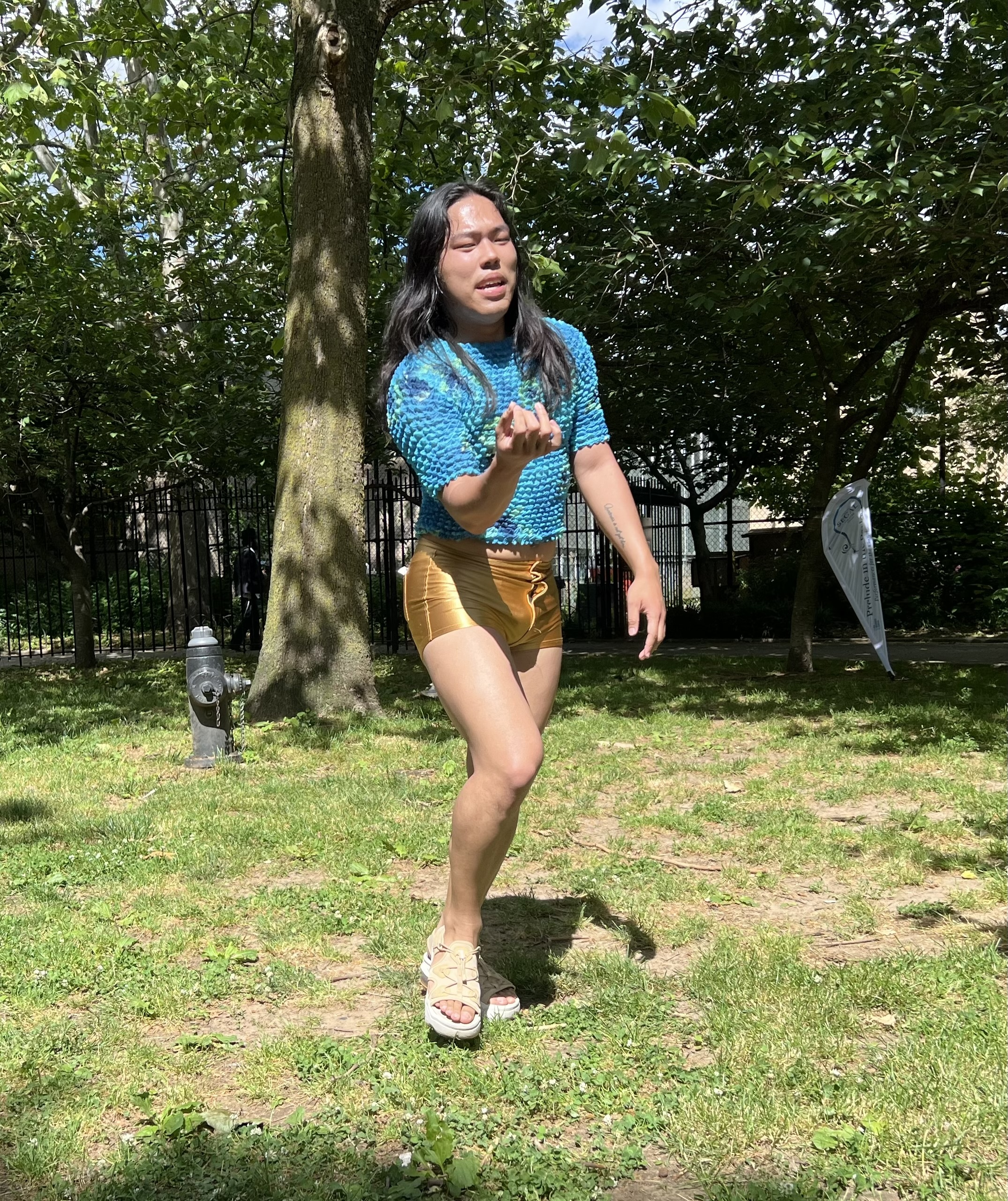
- Anh Vo in Brower Park, Brooklyn, June 2024
- Born: 1995 (age 30–31); Hanoi, Vietnam
- Education: Atlantic College, Brown University, New York University
- Website: https://www.anhqvo.com

Anh Vo (born 1995) is a dancer, choreographer, and writer based in Brooklyn, New York and born in Hanoi, Vietnam. Vo's work has related to themes of conceptualizing wandering ghosts in Vietnamese metaphysics, queer performance, and decolonial engagement with ritual.

In 2012, Vo went to United World College (UWC) Atlantic College in Wales, England, graduating in 2014. In 2014, Vo went to Brown University, for a bachelor in Performance Studies. Vo went to New York University for a Masters of Arts in Performance Studies, graduating in 2019.

== Selected works and performances ==
- Interbeing (2016), Production Workshop, Providence, RI
- 69 Views from the Bottom (2017), Brown University, Providence, RI
- BABYLIFT (2021), Target Margin Theater, Brooklyn, NY
- Yellow for Love (2022), as part of the Octopus series, Performance Space New York, New York City, NY
- non-binary pussy (2023), as part of the Test Pattern series, Institute for Contemporary Art, Richmond, Virginia Commonwealth University, Richmond, VA
- Introjective exhibition (2024), as part of the Queer Durations symposium, Brown Arts Institute, Providence, RI
- Common Fetish (2024), as part of the Means of Production exhibition, Shisanwu Warehouse, Glendale, NY
- Possessed by Capital (10 June, 2025), Downtown Brooklyn (public space), Brooklyn, NY

== Selected publications ==
- "Choreographing Trauma: Abstraction and Awakening in Juliana May’s Folk Incest. Women & Performance, 31(1), 84–87.
- "Secreting the Dreamscape of Capitalism." (2021) Recess Art.
- "A Love Letter to Dance—A Sacrificial Practice." (2022) Imagining: A Gibney Journal, Issue #9.
- “A Força Aparicional da Dança." (2023). Translated by João Dos Santos Martin. Coreia No. 08.
- "Some Hypotheses on Being Possessed: The Body as a Vessel.” TDR:The Drama Review 68, no. 3 (2024): 2–3.
