= Beyond the Aggressives: 25 Years Later =

- Directed by: Daniel Peddle
- Produced by: Robert A. Maylor; Tiq Milan; Stephen Friedman; Jacqueline Woodson; Kristen Wolf; Gerald Herman
- Cinematography: Daniel Peddle; Jeanny Tsai
- Edited by: Yvette Wojciechowski
- Music by: Aidan Salier
- Distributed by: Showtime
- Release date: 2023
- Running time: 80 minutes
- Country: United States
- Language: English

Beyond the Aggressives: 25 Years Later is a 2023 American documentary film by Daniel Peddle. It is a sequel to the 2005 film The Aggressives and reconnects to some of the masculine of center New York-based lesbians of color interviewed in the original. Beyond the Aggressives won the 2024 GLAAD Media Award for Outstanding Documentary.

== Synopsis ==
The film is a sequel to the 2005 film The Aggressives and follows the lives of four of the masculine of center lesbians from the original, known as "aggressives" or "AGs". The sequel includes footage shot from 2018 to 2023. The interview subjects are Kisha Batista, Trevon Haynes, Octavio Sanders and Chin Tsui, three of whom transitioned before or during the second film.

== Production ==
The film was directed by Daniel Peddle, who directed the original film The Aggressives (2005). Its executive producers are Robert A. Maylor, Tiq Milan, Stephen Friedman, Jacqueline Woodson, Kristen Wolf, and Gerald Herman. It was edited by Yvette Wojciechowski. The film was shot from the years 2018 to 2023.

On October 17, 2023, Showtime acquired the rights to the film.

== Release ==
Beyond the Aggressives had its world premiere at NewFest on October 18, 2023. It was released on streaming on Showtime in spring 2024.

== Reception ==
The documentary received positive critical reception. Lisa Kennedy of Variety reviewed the film positively: "If the sequel is resolutely authentic, it's because that quartet remains so. Now in their middle years, the subjects face the typical hurdles of adulthood: loss of loved ones, relationship bumps, health care scares. It's that minuet that makes the film both specific and deeply humane. These journeys haven't been smooth, but many of the challenges are those of growing older and a little wiser." In a review for IndieWire, Ryan Lattanzio rated the film a B+ and praised the focus: "And this time around, the documentary is less infused with the inherent pain of queerness after the millennium and since and more buoyed by the joys of gender expression and wresting oneself from the fictions of institution." Teo Bugbee selected Beyond the Aggressives as a critic's pick for the New York Times.

=== Awards and nominations ===
==== 2024 ====
- Winner, GLAAD Media Award for Outstanding Documentary
- Nominee, Dorian Award for Best LGBTQ Documentary or Documentary Series
