= Gunitsky =

Gunitsky (Russian: Гуницкий) is a Russian surname. Notable people with the surname include:

- Anatoly Gunitsky (1953–2025), Russian writer, journalist, and poet
- Seva Gunitsky, Soviet-born American political scientist

== See also ==
- Grunitzky, people with this surname
