= Kara Keeling =

American humanities academic

Kara Keeling is an American humanities academic. She is professor of American Studies and Ethnicity and chair of Cinema & Media Studies at the USC School of Cinematic Arts.

== Early life and education ==
Keeling was born in 1971. Her father was Rudy Keeling, a basketball coach at Emerson College. She received her PhD in Critical and Cultural Studies from the University of Pittsburgh.

== Research and publications ==
Her research focuses on African American cinema, feminist film theory, critical theory, cultural studies, and gender and sexuality studies.

In 2007, Duke University Press published Keeling's first book, The Witch's Flight: The Cinematic, the Black Femme, and the Image of Common Sense. In this book, Keeling argues that cinema's ability to structure social reality, thus producing and reifying racism, homophobia, and misogyny, can be disrupted by the figure of the Black femme; despite its lack of representation in hegemonic imagery of race and gender, this figure constantly threatens to make visible alternative social arrangements.

Kara Keeling has also written influential articles such as "Looking for M-: Queer Temporality, Black Political Possibility, and Poetry from the Future", published in GLQ in 2009 and "Queer OS", published in Cinema Journal in 2014.

=== "Looking for M-: Queer Temporality, Black Political Possibility, and Poetry from the Future" ===
In her article "Looking for M-: Queer Temporality, Black Political Possibility, and Poetry from the Future", Keeling discusses the temporality and spatiality the Black queer experience through films such as Looking for Langston, Brother to Brother, and The Aggressives. Keeling goes on to talk about the disappearance of one individual, M-, and addresses the fact that the ways in which society functions in the temporal and spatial might not always be ideal for those labeled as the "Other", such as M-.

== Selected works ==
- Queer Times, Black Futures. New York University Press, 2019.
- "Queer OS." Cinema Journal, 2014.
- "Two. I = Another: Digital Identity Politics." in Strange Affinities. Duke University Press, 2011.
- "LOOKING FOR M—: Queer Temporality, Black Political Possibility, and Poetry from the Future." GLQ, 2009.
- "Passing for Human: Bamboozled and Digital Humanism." Women & Performance: A Journal of Feminist Theory, 2008.
- The Witch's Flight: The Cinematic, the Black Femme, and the Image of Common Sense. Duke UP, 2007.
- "'Joining the Lesbians': Cinematic Regimes of Black Lesbian Visibility." in Black Queer Studies. Duke UP, 2005.
- "'Ghetto Heaven': Set It Off and the Valorization of Black Lesbian Butch-Femme Sociality." The Black Scholar, 2003.
- "'In the Interval': Frantz Fanon and the 'Problems' of Visual Representation." Qui Parle, 2003.
- "'A Homegrown Revolutionary'?: Tupac Shakur and the Legacy of the Black Panther Party." The Black Scholar, 1999.
