= The Aggressives =

The Aggressives may refer to:

- The Aggressives (2005 American film), documentary directed by Eric Daniel Peddle
- The Aggressives (2005 South Korean film), directed by Jeong Jae-eun
