= Daniel Peddle =

American film director

Eric Daniel Peddle
- Born: March 8, 1970 (age 55); Winston-Salem, North Carolina, United States
- Occupations: Screenwriter, film director, author, artist

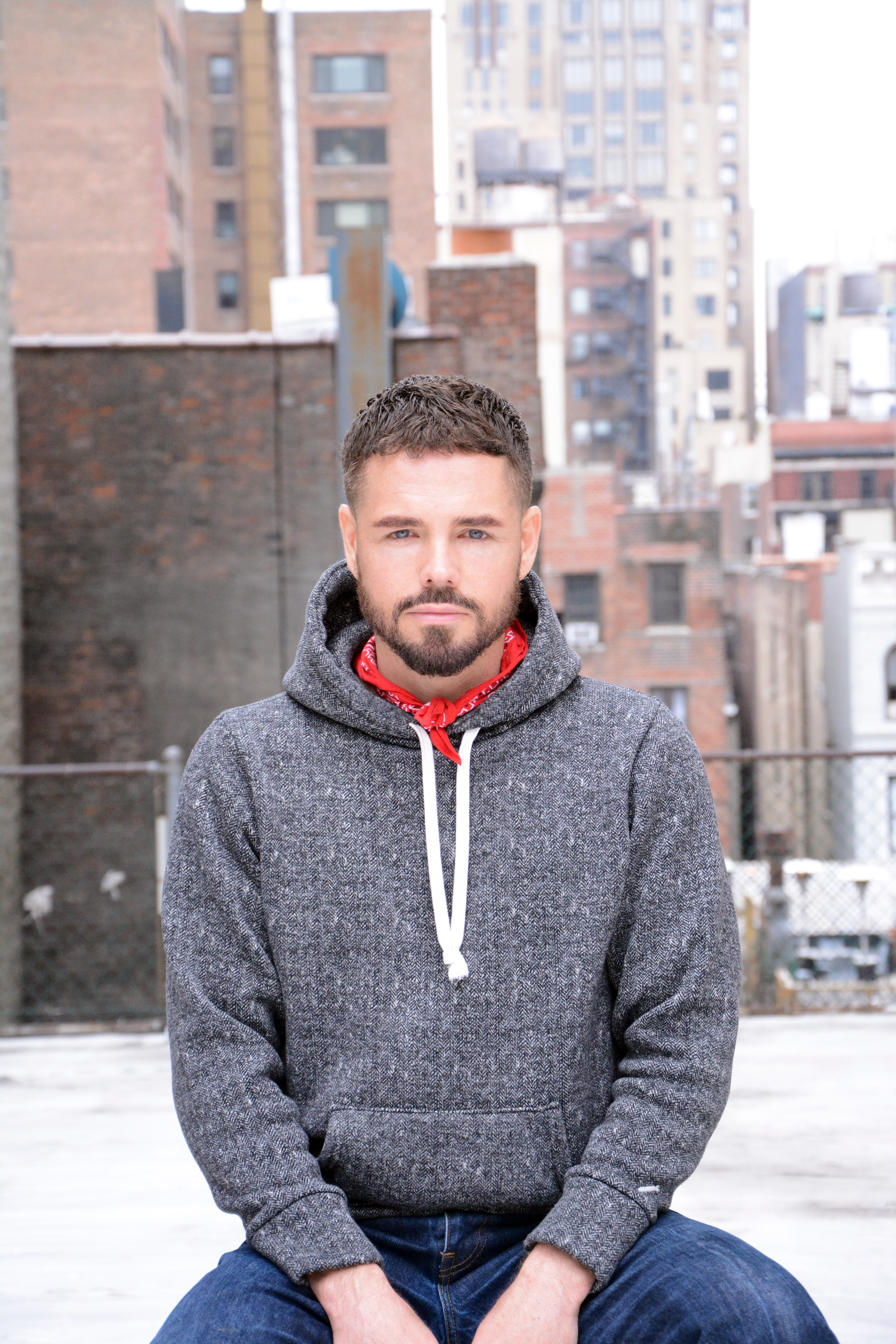
Daniel Peddle on the roof of The Secret Gallery, April 2018

Eric Daniel Peddle (born March 8, 1970) is an American screenwriter, film director, casting director, author, and artist.

== Early life ==
Daniel Peddle was born in Winston-Salem, North Carolina, the son of Betty and Larry Peddle. He graduated from the University of North Carolina at Chapel Hill with a bachelor's degree in Anthropology and RTVMP (Radio, Television and Motion Pictures). While attending graduate film school at NYU, Peddle worked as a “street scout” finding undiscovered talent for his student films. This means of casting evolved into a fashion casting company with an international clientele including Comme des Garçons, Phillip Lim, and Givenchy. His discoveries range from Donald Cumming, former lead singer of "The Virgins", to Academy Award winner Jennifer Lawrence, who he discovered near Union Square, NYC when she was fourteen-years-old, to rising star and top model Mitchell Slaggert.

== Career ==
Peddle formed The Secret Gallery Inc. with partner Drew Dasent in 2001. The company works with international modeling and talent agencies and casts for worldwide print advertising, magazine editorials, runway shows, TV commercials, independent films, and digital media.

It was through street casting that Peddle first encountered the subjects of his debut feature documentary film The Aggressives (2005). The film was awarded the Kinsey Honor from the Kinsey Institute and numerous “Best of” awards at documentary film festivals worldwide. Peddle's essays and photography on The Aggressives was published by PowerHouse Books in the sociocultural anthology, Transculturalism: How The World Is Coming Together, edited by Claude Grunitzky.

Peddle's second documentary, Trail Angels, was released in October 2014 on the Documentary Channel. The film follows four working class "trail angels" who help the annual pilgrimage of thru hikers along the Appalachian Trail.

In 2014, Peddle completed his first narrative feature, Sunset Edge, which had its world premiere at Museum of the Moving Image (New York City). The film was released by Kino International in 2015. Part gothic thriller, part coming-of-age tale, Sunset Edge upends teenage horror films.

Garden of the Peaceful Dragon (2016), Peddle's third feature documentary, is an intimate and transformative portrait of an elderly African-American veteran, Mr. Burley Luvell Benford III, who occupies an abandoned piece of government property in Hawaii. The film premiered at the Harlem International Film Festival as the opening night feature and won the Best Documentary award.

Moss(2018), Peddle's second narrative feature, premiered at the LA Film Festival and stars a cast discovered by Peddle including Mitchell Slaggert and Christine Marzano. The film explores death and isolation in rural America, the creation of "outsider art", gender roles of traditional folklore, and the psychedelic experience as a rite of passage.

Between 2018 - 2023, Peddle shot and finished Beyond The Aggressives: 25 Years Later, a followup to his debut film which revisits four of the original subjects from The Aggressives. The sequel also delves into how much the language, culture, and visibility of the transgender, non-binary, and gender-nonconforming community has evolved, and grapples with the many complexities of gender identity, expectations, and expression. Beyond The Aggressives: 25 Years Later was produced by Wellington Love and acquired by Showtime in 2023.

Peddle's debut solo painting show, “Undertow”, at Envoy Enterprises in 2012, was named “Critic’s Pick” by New York Arts Magazine and garnered national praise.

Doubleday published Peddle's Snow Day, a wordless children's book in 2000. Following Snow Day, Peddle self-published his illustrated wordless books Daisy Diary and Sand Stars, as well as, When Mr. Grand Flew, The Back Talk Trio, Ooooh Baby! and Close Your Eyes: A Bedtime Meditation – all written and illustrated by Peddle. His photography books include Clyde's Dogs and Children of Cumbria. He also authored If, illustrated by Neithard Horn, and The Little Plane That Wouldn't, illustrated by Andy Foltz.

== Filmography ==
- The Aggressives (2005)
- Trail Angels (2010)
- Sunset Edge (2014)
- Garden of The Peaceful Dragon (2017)
- Moss (2018)
- Beyond The Aggressives: 25 Years Later (2023)
