= The Lost Holliday =

2024 American film by Jussie Smollett

- Directed by: Jussie Smollett
- Written by: Jussie Smollett; Jerrell Chesney
- Produced by: Jussie Smollett; Tressa Azarel Smallwood; Mona Scott-Young
- Starring: Vivica A. Fox; Jussie Smollett; Jabari Redd; Marquise Vilsón; Brittany S. Hall; Miriam A. Hyman; Gina Belafonte; Leslie David Baker
- Cinematography: Joe 'Jody' Williams
- Edited by: Jake Smollett
- Music by: Shajuan Andrews
- Production companies: A SuperMassive Movie; MegaMind Media; Monami Entertainment
- Distributed by: AMC Theatres Distribution
- Release dates: June 2024 (American Black Film Festival); September 27, 2024
- Running time: 101 minutes
- Country: United States
- Language: English

The Lost Holliday is a 2024 American drama film directed by Jussie Smollett and written by Smollett and Jerrell Chesney. Smollett also recorded a soundtrack album for the movie.

The film premiered at the 28th annual American Black Film Festival in June 2024. It was released in selected theatres on September 27, 2024, by AMC Theatres. It was also released on Amazon Prime on May 9, 2025.

== Plot ==
The film follows Cassandra Marshall (Vivica Fox), who travels to Los Angeles to plan the funeral of her estranged son, Damien (Jabari Redd). Upon her arrival, Cassandra discovers that the funeral arrangements are already being handled by her son's husband, Jason (Jussie Smollett).

== Cast ==
- Vivica A. Fox as Cassandra Marshall
- Jussie Smollett as Jason Holliday
- Jabari Redd as Damien Holliday
- Marquise Vilsón as DeSean 'Duck' Adesina
- Brittany S. Hall as Cheyenne Holliday
- Miriam A. Hyman as Katia Del Gado
- Gina Belafonte as Meredith Clayton-Perrineau
- Leslie David Baker as Dr. Blevins
- Londyn Carter as Arielle Adams-Holliday
- Memphis Cade as Garland Kirby IV
- Cynthia Bailey as Victoria Van Der Poole

== Reception ==
On film rating website IMDb the film has a 1.9/10 average rating from 557 reviews.
