= I'm from Rolling Stone =

Television series

I'm from Rolling Stone is a MTV reality television show directed by Norman Green. It began airing in January 2007 and was planned for ten episodes. Six aspiring music journalists were given the summer internships in hopes of getting a contributing editor position at Rolling Stone magazine.

The contestants included six twenty-somethings that applied through a write-in contest: Krishtine de Leon is a local hip-hop magazine editor from San Francisco, CA; Peter Maiden, an Australian college student at UC Berkeley; Tiq Milan, a queer poet and freelance journalist from Brooklyn; Russell Morse, a former juvenile delinquent turned reporter for a local San Francisco newspaper; Krystal Ann Simpson from Salinas with a love for classic rock; and Colin Stutz, a 20-year-old University of Southern California student from Oregon.

The show was co-produced by Yolo Films, Rolling Stone, Maverick Films, Vertigo Entertainment, and MTV.

== Results ==
Later it was revealed that the winner of the year-long contributing editor position was Krishtine de Leon. It was speculated that her extensive understanding of hip-hop music and culture and her ability to turn in usable, relevant material was what catapulted her over the top.

== After I'm from Rolling Stone ==
Krishtine de Leon became a full-time artist under the stage name Rocky Rivera and has released multiple music projects over the years. She no longer does music journalism but currently writes for KQED under her column Frisco Foodies. Her first book Snakeskin: Essays by Rocky Rivera was published in 2021.

Peter Maiden is now a video editor for Rolling Stone. He is also a bartender in New York.

Tiq Milan became a freelance writer for a new magazine called Dapper, before coming out as a trans man.

Russell Morse returned to San Francisco and his position at New American Media. He now works as an Outreach Coordinator at a Youth Development Organization called The Door in Manhattan.

Krystal Ann Simpson currently splits her time between Los Angeles and New York designing, modeling, and writing for her social commentary blog WhatisRealityAnyway.com.

Colin Stutz returned to Los Angeles to complete his junior year at USC and work as the editorial assistant at Filter Magazine.

== Viewership ==
The show was plagued by low ratings, getting only 369,000 viewers for the premiere episode. To further exacerbate the problem, the show's time slot was also pushed back to 11 PM. The show was generally considered a flop due to very little promotion and its aim towards an older demographic, thus it was not renewed for a second season.
