= Tom Lipinski =

American actor (born 1982)

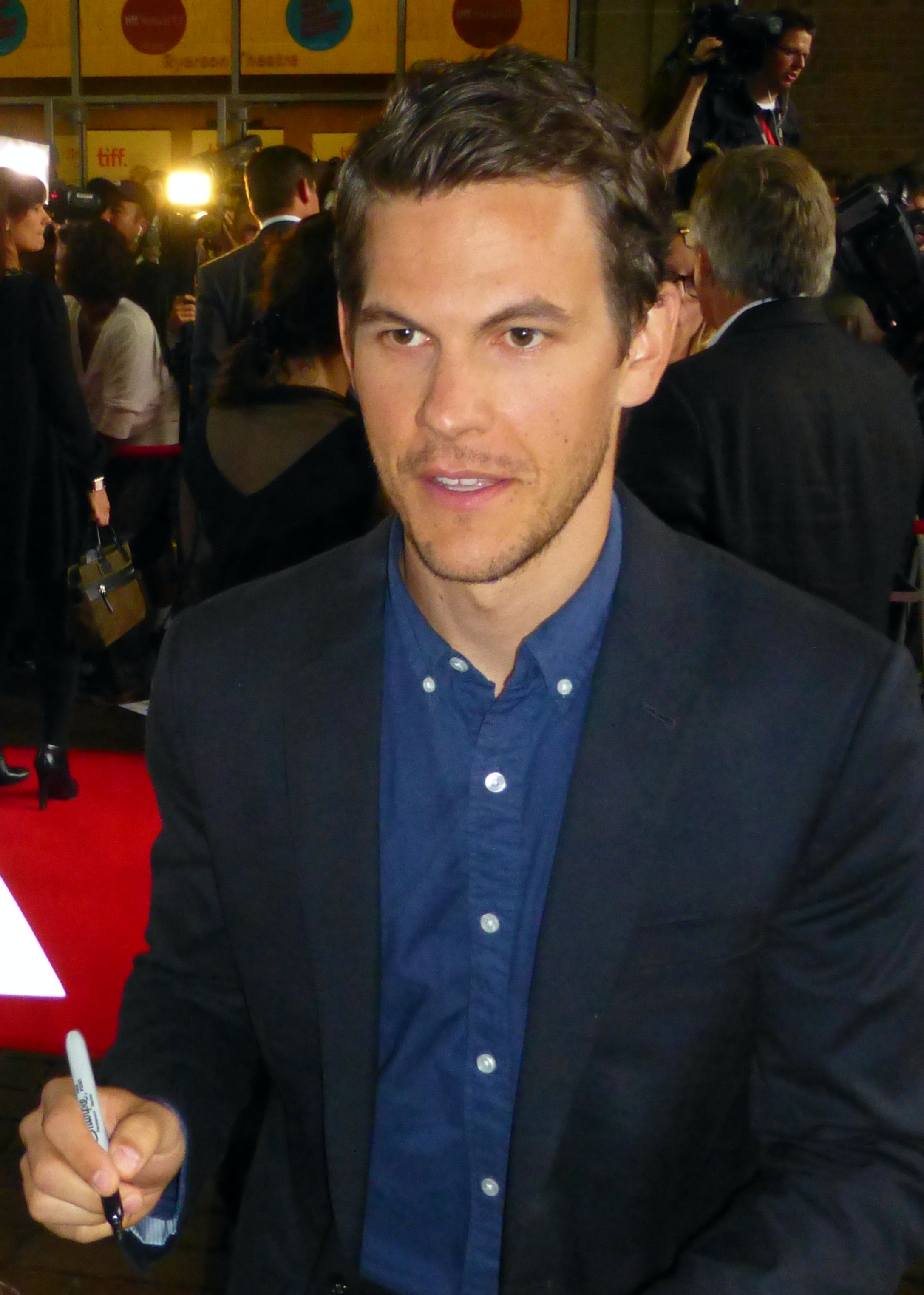
- Tom Lipinski at the Labor Day premiere, Toronto Film Festival 2013
- Born: June 25, 1982 (age 44); Boston, Massachusetts, U.S.
- Education: Concord - Carlisle High School; Brown University
- Occupation: Actor
- Years active: 2009–present
- Spouse: Shannon Gillen (m. 2012)
- Parents: Joseph Lipinski (father); Edith Lipinski (mother)
- Awards: Edward R. Murrow Award

Tom Lipinski (born June 25, 1982) is an American actor, writer, director and producer known for many recurring television roles, and perhaps best known for his role as Trevor Evans on Suits.

== Early life and education ==
Lipinski was an All-American athlete in high school but did not pursue it as a career. Lipinski's father Joseph hoped his son would enter into the medical profession, but Tom became interested in the performing arts while in an experimental theater troupe at Brown University, where he majored in history from 2000 to 2004. After earning a degree, Lipsinki explored experimental stage performance at The Theatre of the Two-Headed Calf in Rhode Island, among other venues. During his early acting career, he worked as a building manager at Limewire in Tribeca.

== Career ==
Lipinski's first film role in The Wrestler (2008) was cut, after which he appeared in a few short films in 2009. Beginning in 2010, his career gained traction with a television debut in the Law & Order franchise (Law & Order and Law & Order: Criminal Intent), and the TV movie The Wonderful Maladys.

Prominent directors under which Lipsinki has worked include Jason Reitman, Steven Soderbergh, and Paolo Sorrentino.

Besides acting, Lipsinki has become a writer, director, and producer, making his directorial debut in Ben, a 2013 short film. In 2021, he co-created and produced twenty-one episodes of Gone South, a journalism podcast series that has investigated high-profile cases, such as the unsolved murder of a New Orleans Assistant District Attorney.

== Awards ==
The podcast Gone South, which Lipinski co-created and produced, was given an Edward R. Murrow Award by the Radio Television Digital News Association in 2022.

== Filmography ==
=== Film ===
Tom Lipinski film credits
Year	Title	Role	Notes	Ref.
2011	Certainty	Dom McGuire		
2013	Labor Day	Young Frank		
2015	Dial a Prayer	Chase		
2015	Don't Worry Baby	Lenny		
2015	Youth	Screenwriter in Love		
2016	Blood Stripe	The Fisherman		
2021	The Spine of Night	Falconhawk (voice)		
2023	Nobody's Home	Carl		
2024	Dark My Light	Dreyfus Trier		

=== Television ===
Tom Lipinski television credits
Year	Title	Role	Notes	Ref.
2010	Law & Order	Derek Fanning	Episode: "Blackmail"	
2010	Law & Order: Criminal Intent	Dr. Maynard Curtis / Andy Quinn / Tommy	Episode: "Three-In-One"	
2010	The Wonderful Maladys	Seth	TV movie	
2011	A Gifted Man	Hank	1 episode	
2011	Blue Bloods	Johnny Tesla	Episode: "Moonlighting"	
2011	Suits	Trevor	11 episodes	
2013	Deception	Ben Preswick	8 episodes	
2013	The Following	Charlie Mead	4 episodes	
2014	Pan Am	Stefan	Episode: "New Frontiers"	
2014	Broad City	Ben	Episode: "Stolen Phone"	
2014–2015	The Knick	Phillip Showalter	11 episodes	
2015	The Key of Awesome	Boyfriend	1 episode	
2016–2020	Blindspot	Cade	4 episodes	
2016	Madoff	Mark Madoff	TV mini series	
2016	Bull	Dr. Terrence Robeson	Episode Bedside Manner	
2017	Orange is the New Black	Reg King	2 episodes	
2017	Odd Mom Out	Lockhart	Episode: "Children in the Corn Pudding"	
2018	Billions	Tim Dones	6 episodes	
2018–2019	Tell Me a Story	Bruce	3 episodes	
2019	The Blacklist	Marcus Duncan	1 episode	
2019	The Code	Capt. William Dyer	Episode: "Above the Knee"	
2019	When They See Us	Detective Farrell	TV mini series	
2021–2022	Snowpiercer	Kevin McMahon	9 episodes	
2023	Chicago P.D.	Borkowski	Episode: "This Job"	
2025	FBI: Most Wanted	Patrick Henderson	Episode: "68 Seconds"	
2025	Tires	Brock Majors	1 Episode	
2026	Law & Order: Special Victims Unit	Joseph Dahlsonn	Season 27, Episode 9	
