= Rocky Rivera =

Filipina-American rapper and journalist (born 1982)

Rocky Rivera (born Krishtine de Leon; December 1, 1982) is a Filipina-American rapper and journalist from San Francisco, CA. She is a member of the hip-hop label Beatrock Music, where she gained recognition for her socially conscious lyrics and advocacy for social justice. Her style can be described as "militant feminist Hip Hop." The subject matter in her music often touches on issues of sexism, racism, women empowerment, gentrification, systematic oppression, motherhood, capitalism, religion and politics.

== Early life ==
Rivera was born in Angeles City, Philippines as the youngest of three sisters. Her family immigrated to the United States when she was four years old. As a military child, she grew up on Treasure Island for the majority of her childhood when it was still a naval base. Once the naval base closed down in 1997, her family moved into the Excelsior District where she would attend and graduate from Balboa High School. After graduation, she would then go on to enroll at San Francisco State University to major in journalism.

== Journalism career ==
As a journalist, Rivera has written for major publications like Rolling Stone, The Source, and XXL.

From 2004 to 2006, Rivera was the editor-in-chief and writer for the now defunct hip-hop magazine Ruckus while she was a 22 year old journalism student.

In 2021, Rivera released her first book, "Snakeskin: Essays by Rocky Rivera," and hosted a virtual book release party on Twitch alongside hip-hop journalism veterans Jeff Chang, Davey D. Cook and Rob Kenner.

Although she no longer covers music journalism, she still contributes articles regularly to KQED and writes the column, Frisco Foodies.

== "I'm From Rolling Stone" ==
In 2007, Rivera became one out of six contestants in MTV's reality show “I'm From Rolling Stone” after seeing postings about auditions for the show on Myspace. She felt being a part of the show was an opportunity to highlight the Bay Area hip-hop scene that wasn't being recognized for their contributions to the greater culture of hip-hop.

Despite the glamorous, celebrity-filled perception of the pop-culture music magazine, she described the experience as a summer intern at Rolling Stone on the show like "any other office [job] with cubicles."

She ended up winning the year-long contributing editor position at Rolling Stone, but eventually went on to pursue music full-time as Rocky Rivera after the contract was over. A big reason for her transition from journalism and into making music, “trading her Moleskines for microphones” as she puts it, was the racism and sexism she faced while on national television. As a result, one of her goals as a rapper is to combat industry misogyny.

== Music career ==
Rocky Rivera grew up listening and looking up to artists like Queen Latifah, Salt n’ Pepa, and MC Lyte.

Her stage name is derived from the book authored by Jessica Hagedorn, "Gangster of Love." The main character Raquel, or Rocky Rivera, is a Filipino girl who moves to San Francisco from Manila, Philippines. She chose the stage name as a homage to her Filipina and San Francisco roots.

In 2004, Rivera founded the Filipina-American rapper collective the Rhapsodistas where she went by the alias EyeASage. The members included spoken-word artist Irene “Shortyrocwell” Duller, Valerie “Sho Shock” Francisco and Natasha “Sola” Pineda who they met through San Francisco State University's League of Filipino Students. A fifth member, Liezel “Zelstarrr” Rivera, joined the group later on as a singer.

By 2006, the collective would slowly disband as the members naturally grew apart with life responsibilities of school, careers, political organizing and raising families. Only Rocky Rivera would move on to take music seriously as a professional artist where she released her first mixtape Married to the Hustle in 2008 and debut solo album, "Rocky Rivera" in 2010.

Her most notable song from her self-titled album, "Heart", speaks on the lives of Angela Davis, Gabriela Silang, and Dolores Huerta. Rivera felt these three important women of color should be more well known alongside the Cesar Chavez's, Malcolm X's and Martin Luther King's because they were fighting not only for Third World liberation and people of color but also for women.

She released her second solo album, "Gangster of Love" in 2013 and followed in 2015 with her EP, "Nom De Guerre."

In 2016, she released the single "Busy Gyal" with Singapore-based DJ Perk Pietrek under Far East Movement’s label, Brednbutter. This fast-paced EDM track was unlike anything she had released in the past, but it became one of her most streamed songs and used in the TV shows "Queen of the South" on TBS and "S.W.A.T." on CBS.

In 2018, she collaborated with Women's Audio Mission to record her third solo album, "Rocky's Revenge."

In 2024, she released a collaborative album with emcee/producer Otayo Dubb titled "Long Kiss Goodnight."

In October of 2026, she released a five-song EP with long time collaborator/producer Fatgums titled "The Craft." This project traces the experiences, influences, and memories that shaped Rivera as an artist, from finding her voice to claiming her place in hip-hop.

== Activism and community organizing ==
In addition to her music career, Rocky Rivera has worked with organizations such as the League of Filipino Students at SFSU, Filipino Community Center of the Excelsior, and Oakland Kids First.

During her time at Oakland Kids First from 2012 to 2017, her role as an afterschool program leader involved organizing students at underserved high schools to fight against punitive discipline and for restorative justice.

== Discography ==
- The Craft (2026)
- Long Kiss Goodnight (2024)
- Rock & Roz Vol. #10: ROCK & ROZ FOREVER (2022)
- Rock & Roz Vol. #9: Blue Bird (2021)
- Rock & Roz Vol. #8: Up All Nite (2020)
- Rocky's Revenge (2018)
- Rock & Roz Vol. #7: Winter in AmeriKKKa (2017)
- Rock & Roz Vol. #6: Morning After Mixtape 3 (2016)
- Nom de Guerre (2015)
- Rock & Roz Vol. #5: Rose Gold (2015)
- Gangster of Love (2013)
- Rock & Roz Vol. #4: Morning After Mixtape 2 (2013)
- Rock & Roz Vol. #3: Morning After Mixtape (2012)
- Pop Killer Mixtape (2011)
- Rock & Roz Vol. #2: Friday 420 Mixtape (2011)
- Rocky Rivera (2010)
- Rock & Roz Vol. #1: Hearts + Minds Mixtape (2010)
- Married to the Hustle Mixtape (2008)
