= Tod Williams (filmmaker) =

American director and producer

- Born: Tod Culpan Williams; September 27, 1968 (age 57); Manhattan, New York, U.S.
- Other name: Kip Williams
- Occupations: Director; producer; screenwriter
- Years active: 1998–present
- Notable work: Paranormal Activity 2
- Spouses: Famke Janssen (m. 1989; div. 2000) Gretchen Mol (m. 2004)
- Children: 2
- Family: Rachel Williams (sister)

Tod Culpan "Kip" Williams (born September 27, 1968) is an American filmmaker. He is best known for directing the 2010 horror film Paranormal Activity 2.

== Life and career ==
Williams, born in Manhattan in 1968, is the son of architect Tod Williams and dancer Patricia Agnes Jones. His parents divorced when he was three years old, and he and his older sister, model Rachel Williams, lived with their mother in the West Village in Lower Manhattan. After his mother's remarriage in the late 1970s, they moved to Woodstock, New York.

Williams studied painting and literature at Bard College and Columbia University before finding work as a stringer for the New York Times, Los Angeles bureau. Next, he attended the American Film Institute.

On March 27, 2010, he was named as the director of Paranormal Activity 2; he replaced Kevin Greutert, who was originally set to direct.

Williams was married to actress Famke Janssen from 1989 to 2000. He has been married to actress Gretchen Mol since June 1, 2004. Their first child, a son, was born in September 2007. Their second child, a daughter, was born in February 2011.

== Filmography ==
- The Adventures of Sebastian Cole (1998)
- The Door in the Floor (2004)
- Wings Over the Rockies (2009)
- Paranormal Activity 2 (2010)
- Cell (2016)
- Unknown Dimension: The Story of Paranormal Activity (2021) (Documentary film, actor - himself)
