= Rudy Keeling =

American college basketball coach and administrator

Biographical details
- Born: March 14, 1947
- Died: July 6, 2013 (aged 66); Londonderry, New Hampshire, U.S.
- Education: Quincy

Coaching career (HC unless noted)
- 1977–1980: Bergan HS
- 1980–1986: Bradley (assistant)
- 1986–1988: Marquette (assistant)
- 1988–1996: Maine
- 1996–2001: Northeastern

Administrative career (AD unless noted)
- 2002–2007: Emerson
- 2007–2013: ECAC (Commissioner)

Head coaching record
- Overall: 154–214 (college)

Harold Rudolph Keeling (March 14, 1947 – July 6, 2013) was an American college basketball coach and administrator. He was a Division I head basketball coach at the University of Maine and Northeastern University, before becoming Athletic Director at Emerson College and commissioner of the Eastern College Athletic Conference (ECAC).

Keeling attended Bishop Dubois High School and Quincy University, where he played basketball and graduated in 1970. In 1977, he began his coaching career as head coach of Bergan High School in Peoria, Illinois. In 1980, he was hired as an assistant at Bradley University by head coach Dick Versace. After a stint at Marquette, Keeling was named head coach at Maine in 1988 – the school's first African-American head coach. In eight seasons at Maine, he compiled a record of 106–122 and led the school to its first 20 win season. From there, Keeling was named head coach at Northeastern, where in five seasons he went 48–92.

In 2002, Keeling was named athletic director at Emerson College, where in his five years he added five varsity sports. In 2007, he left to become commissioner of the ECAC, the first African-American commissioner of a major conference.

Keeling died on July 6, 2013, in Londonderry, New Hampshire. His daughter is Kara Keeling, a film and gender studies academic. Other children include, Harold Keeling, David Keeling, Lisa Keeling, Christopher "Kip"Keeling, Tina Keeling, and Cory Keeling.

== Head coaching record ==
=== College ===
Record table
Season	Team	Overall	Conference	Standing	Postseason
Maine Black Bears (North Atlantic Conference) (1988–1996)
1988–89	Maine	9–19	7–11	6th	
1989–90	Maine	11–17	6–6	4th	
1990–91	Maine	13–16	7–3	2nd	
1991–92	Maine	17–15	8–6	3rd	
1992–93	Maine	10–17	4–10	5th	
1993–94	Maine	20–9	11–3	2nd	
1994–95	Maine	11–16	6–10	8th	
1995–96	Maine	15–13	11–7	3rd	
Maine:		106–122 (.465)	60–56 (.517)		
Northeastern Huskies (America East Conference) (1996–2001)
1996–97	Northeastern	7–20	6–12	7th	
1997–98	Northeastern	14–14	9–9	7th	
1998–99	Northeastern	10–18	6–12	7th	
1999–00	Northeastern	7–21	5–13	9th	
2000–01	Northeastern	10–19	8–10	6th	
Northeastern:		48–92 (.343)	34–56 (.378)		
Total:		154–214 (.418)			
