= Molly Ephraim =

American actress (born 1986)

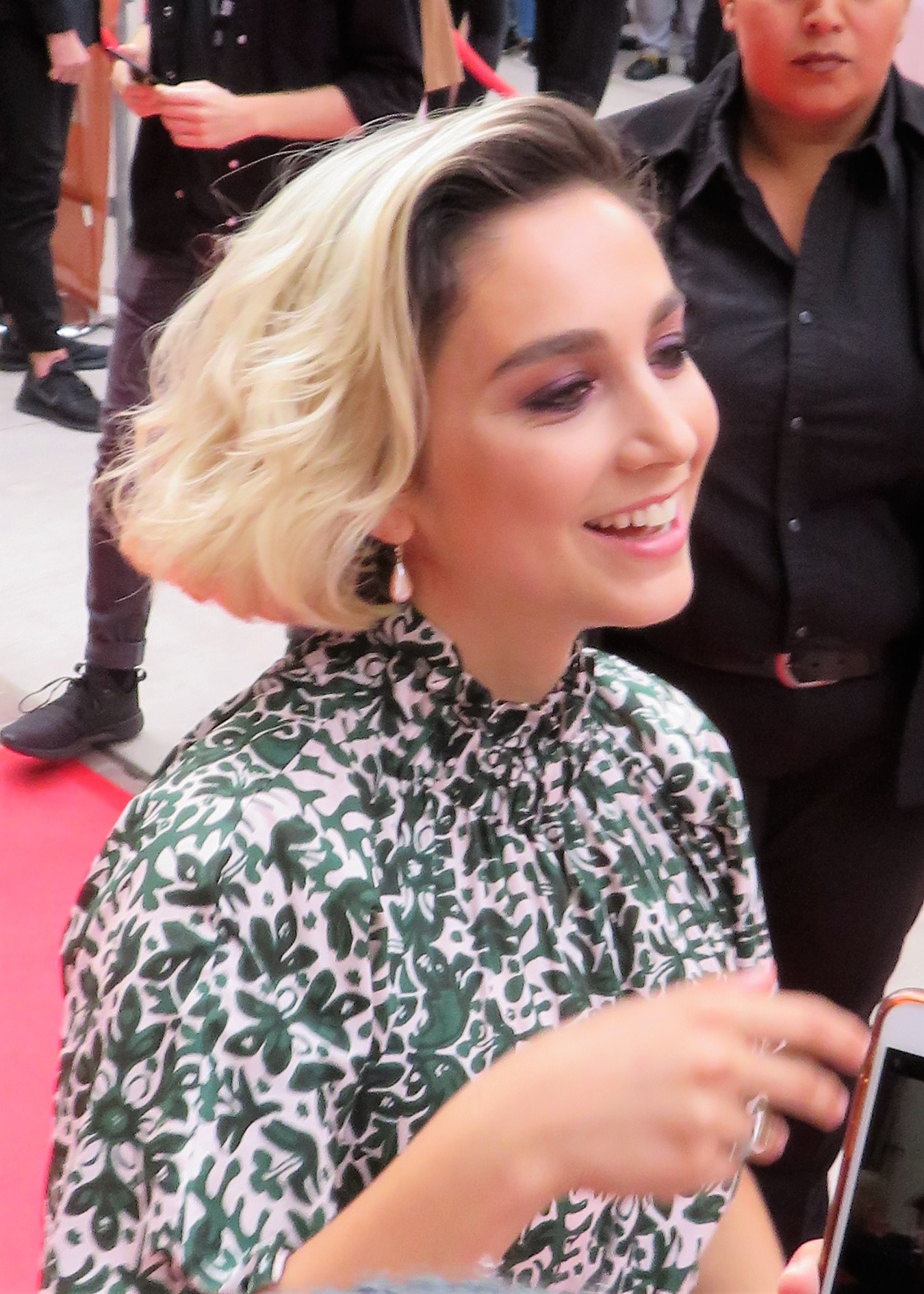
- Ephraim at the premiere of Front Runner, 2018 Toronto Film Festival
- Born: May 22, 1986 (age 40); Philadelphia, Pennsylvania, U.S.
- Education: Princeton University (BA)
- Occupation: Actress
- Years active: 2002–present
- Known for: Last Man Standing; Paranormal Activity 2
- Spouse: Evan (m. 2021)
- Children: 1

Molly Ephraim (born May 22, 1986) is an American actress who has appeared in films, television, and Broadway, Off-Broadway, and regional theater productions. She is best known for her role as Mandy Baxter on the ABC/Fox sitcom Last Man Standing during its original run (2011–2017) before its move to Fox after its sixth season. Ephraim has also appeared on a number of other TV series, including Brockmire (2017), Halt and Catch Fire (2017), and Casual (2018). Ephraim portrayed Irene Kelly in the Hugh Jackman movie The Front Runner (2018), her second collaboration with her Last Man Standing co-star Kaitlyn Dever. She also appeared on HBO's Perry Mason as Della Street’s lover Hazel Prystock. She played Maybelle Fox on the Amazon series A League of Their Own.

== Early life ==
Ephraim was born in Philadelphia, Pennsylvania. She is Jewish. She grew up in Bucks County, Pennsylvania. Ephraim performed in shows at the Bucks County Playhouse, and in professional productions at the Prince Music Theater and at the Arden Theatre Company in Philadelphia.

In 2008, Ephraim graduated from Princeton University with a B.A. in Religious Studies, after going to Central Bucks East High School. At Princeton she was a member of the Triangle Club and performed in and choreographed various shows for Princeton University Players and Theatre Intime.

== Career ==
=== Theater ===
Ephraim made her Broadway debut as Little Red Riding Hood in the Broadway revival of Into the Woods in 2002, receiving a Drama League Award nomination. She later played Bielke in a Broadway revival of Fiddler on the Roof (2004). Off-Broadway, Ephraim played Rachel Stein in End Days at the Ensemble Studio Theatre in 2009. She played Olive in The 25th Annual Putnam County Spelling Bee at the Barrington Stage Company in 2008, in a remounting of the production with new direction by Jeremy Dobrish, and at the North Shore Music Theatre. In 2010, she played Anne Frank in The Diary of Anne Frank at the Westport Country Playhouse.

In 2015, Ephraim appeared as "Daphna Feygenbaum" in Joshua Harmon's Bad Jews at the Geffen Playhouse in Los Angeles.

=== Film and television ===
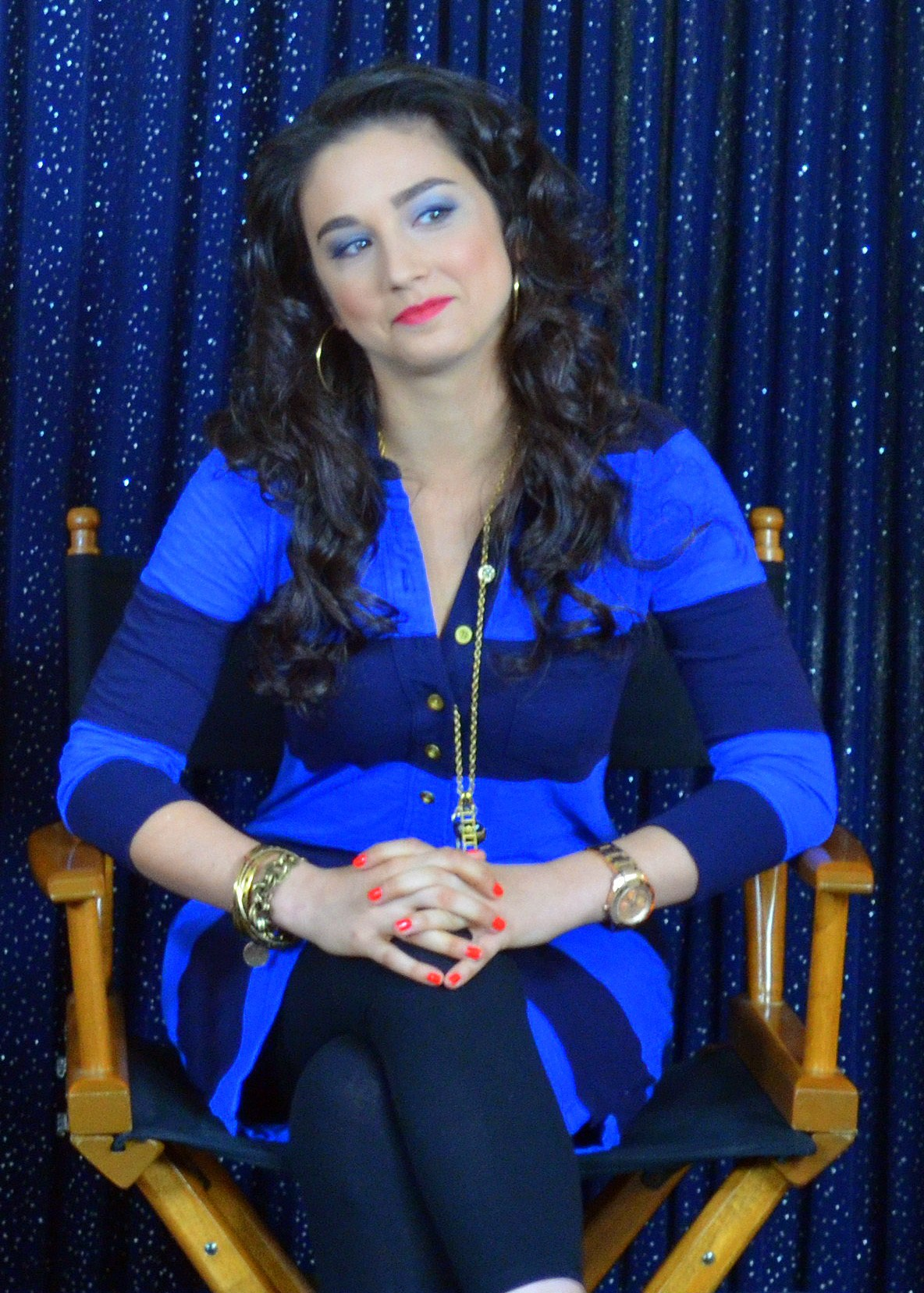
Ephraim in 2012

Ephraim appeared as a series regular in the role of Mandy Baxter, daughter of series' lead Mike Baxter (portrayed by Tim Allen), on the ABC sitcom Last Man Standing, which premiered on October 11, 2011 and originally ended in March 2017, canceled after six seasons. The series was revived by Fox in May 2018, but Ephraim opted not to return for the show's seventh season, with Molly McCook recast in the role.

Ephraim has appeared on several other television series, including Royal Pains (2009), Law & Order (2008), the Michael J. Fox-produced pilot Hench at Home (2003), the HBO pilot The Wonderful Maladys (2009), and has had recurring roles on Brockmire (2017), Halt and Catch Fire (2017), Casual (2018) and Perry Mason (2020).

Ephraim portrayed Wendy Greenhut in the film College Road Trip (2008) and Ali Rey in the film Paranormal Activity 2 (2010) and the spin-off film Paranormal Activity: The Marked Ones (2014). Ephraim appeared in a supporting role in the 2018 biographical political drama The Front Runner, portraying Irene Kelly. She also played Gypsy Rose Blanchard's attorney in The Act on Hulu.

Ephraim played Maybelle Fox on the Amazon series A League of Their Own.

== Personal life ==
Ephraim married in September 2021. Her husband, Evan, works at a software company. On December 1, 2021, Ephraim gave birth to the couple's first child, daughter Zia.

== Filmography ==
=== Film ===
Year	Title	Role	Notes
2008	College Road Trip	Wendy Greenhut	
2010	Paranormal Activity 2	Ali Rey	
2014	Paranormal Activity: The Marked Ones	Ali Rey	
2015	Gravy	Cricket	
2018	The Front Runner	Irene Kelly	
2021	Unknown Dimension: The Story of Paranormal Activity	Herself	Documentary film

=== Television ===
Year	Title	Role	Note(s)
2003	Hench at Home	Ally Hench	Unsold ABC pilot
2008	Law & Order	Anne-Marie Liscomb	Episode: "Tango"
2009	Royal Pains	Beth Samuels	Episode: "It's Like Jamais Vu All Over Again"
2010	The Wonderful Maladys	Emo Girl	Unsold HBO pilot
2011–2017	Last Man Standing	Mandy Baxter	Main role, 130 episodes
2017	Brockmire	Bartender	Recurring role, 5 episodes
2017	Halt and Catch Fire	Alexa Vonn	Recurring role (season 4), 5 episodes
2018	Casual	Jess	3 episodes
2019	The Act	Kate	Episode: "Free"
2019	Modern Family	Libby	Episode: "Snapped"
2020	Perry Mason	Hazel Prystock	Episode: "Chapters 4-8"
2021	Pretty Smart	Margot Wainwright	Episode: "Did you hear?! Chelsea ran into Margot!"
2022	Angelyne	Wendy Wallach	2 episodes
2022	A League of Their Own	Maybelle Fox	8 episodes
2025	The Paper	Summer Cooper	
