= Noemi Gonzalez =

American actress (born 1988)

- Born: Noemi Artemisa Gonzalez; July 3, 1988 (age 38)
- Education: University of California, Santa Barbara (BFA)
- Occupation: Actress
- Years active: 2011–present

Noemi Artemisa Gonzalez (born July 3, 1988) is an American actress. She portrayed Soli Gomez in the Hulu series East Los High and portrayed the character of Mia Rosales on CBS Daytime soap opera The Young and the Restless from 2018 to 2019.

== Early years and career ==
Gonzalez was raised in Desert Hot Springs, California, and is of Mexican descent. Gonzalez graduated from Desert Hot Springs High School. She then attended the University of California, Santa Barbara, where she earned a bachelor of fine arts in 2010. In 2013, Gonzalez was cast as Soli Gomez on Hulu's drama series East Los High. Gonzalez continued to appear in many different roles on television, including the FOX drama series Rosewood, as well as film, such as 2014's Paranormal Activity: The Marked Ones and 2020's The Tax Collector. On October 26, 2018, Gonzalez was announced as being cast as Mia Rosales on CBS's American television soap opera The Young and the Restless. On November 12, 2019, Netflix announced the cast to their upcoming Selena: The Series, based on legendary Tejano artist Selena Quintanilla, which included Gonzalez as the eponymous character's sister, drummer, and the producer of the show, Suzette.

== Filmography ==
Film
Year	Title	Role	Notes
2011	Talker	Fernanda	Short film
2011	Blackbird	Lana	Short film
2014	Paranormal Activity: The Marked Ones	Evette Arista	Theatrical release
2015	Cobalt 60	Esme	Short film
2015	The Vatican Tapes	Maria	Theatrical release
2017	The Good Nanny	Marie	Television Movie
2017	Traces	Kate	
2020	The Tax Collector	Delia Cuevas	
2022	The Valet	Clara	
2022	Undercover Holiday	Jaylen Rodriguez	Television Movie
2025	A Working Man	Carla Garcia	

Television
Year	Title	Role	Notes
2013	East Los High	Soli Gomez	27 episodes (Season 1); Reprised her role for the series finale in 2017
2014	Gang Related	Olivia	Episode: "El Buey y El Alacran"
2015	The Kicks	Coach Maria Flores	Two Episodes: "Pilot" and "There's No I in Team"
2016	Rosewood	Leticia Covarrubias	Episode: "Prosopagnosia & Parrotfish"
2018–2019	The Young and the Restless	Mia Rosales	30 episodes
2019	Dark/Web	Molly	3 episodes
2020–2021	Selena: The Series	Suzette Quintanilla	
