= The Wonderful Maladys =

- Genre: Comedy drama
- Created by: Charles Randolph
- Directed by: Alan Taylor
- Starring: Sarah Michelle Gellar; Nate Corddry; Molly Parker; Adam Scott; Zak Orth
- Country of origin: United States

Production
- Executive producers: Charles Randolph; Sarah Michelle Gellar
- Production location: New York City
- Editor: Tim Squyres
- Camera setup: Single camera
- Running time: 30 minutes

Original release
- Network: HBO
- Release: June 4, 2010

The Wonderful Maladys is a HBO television pilot written by Charles Randolph, directed by Alan Taylor, and starring Sarah Michelle Gellar. HBO did not pick up the series.

== Plot ==
The show was to have followed three adult siblings in New York City after their parents' deaths. Alice (Sarah Michelle Gellar) found refuge in alcohol and aggressiveness. Mary (Molly Parker) found refuge in her work as a therapist, despite being unable to follow advice she gives to her clients. The last one, Neil (Nate Corddry), found refuge in "weirdness".

== Production ==
The pilot starred Sarah Michelle Gellar, who also served as an executive producer.

On May 11, 2009, the pilot began shooting at midday in New York City. Outside shots were filmed and recorded at 113th and Riverside Drive two days later, on May 13, 2009.

The pilot also starred Nate Corddry as Gellar's younger "bookish grad student" brother, Molly Parker as her older therapist sister, Adam Scott as Alice's ex, and Zak Orth as her sister's husband.

The pilot was not picked up by HBO.

== Cast ==
- Sarah Michelle Gellar as Alice Malady
- Adam Scott as Alice's ex-boyfriend
- Molly Parker as Mary Malady
- Nate Corddry as Neil Malady
- Zak Orth as Mary's playwright husband
- Justine Cotsonas as Bali
- Tom Lipinski as Seth
- Molly Ephraim as Emo Girl
- Adam Driver as Zed
- Derek Milman as Jeffery
- Stephanie Ellis as Silka Copans
- Pia Shah as Ruchi
- Shoshanna Withers as Flight Attendant
- Monica Kapoor as Pregnant Hostess
