= Paranormal Activity: The Marked Ones =

2014 film by Christopher Landon

- Theatrical release poster
- Directed by: Christopher Landon
- Written by: Christopher Landon
- Based on: Paranormal Activity by Oren Peli
- Produced by: Jason Blum; Oren Peli
- Starring: Jorge Diaz; Andrew Jacobs; Gabrielle Walsh; Richard Cabral; Noemi Gonzalez; Carlos Pratts; David Saucedo; Renée Victor; Micah Sloat; Katie Featherston
- Cinematography: Gonzalo Amat
- Edited by: Gregory Plotkin
- Production companies: Blumhouse Productions; Solana Films; Room 101, Inc.
- Distributed by: Paramount Pictures
- Release date: January 3, 2014 (United States)
- Running time: 84 minutes
- Country: United States
- Language: English
- Budget: $5–9.2 million
- Box office: $90.9 million

Paranormal Activity: The Marked Ones is a 2014 American found footage supernatural horror film written and directed by Christopher Landon. It is a spin-off and the fifth in the Paranormal Activity film series. The film stars Andrew Jacobs, Jorge Diaz, Gabrielle Walsh, Richard Cabral, Noemi Gonzalez, and Renée Victor, with Micah Sloat and Katie Featherston reprising their roles from earlier films.

Set in 2012 in Oxnard, California, the film follows teenager Jesse Arista as he becomes "marked" after investigating the death of a neighbor and a series of occult artifacts, leading to escalating paranormal events tied to a witches' coven. The story connects to the broader franchise mythology and culminates in events that intersect with the conclusion of the first film.

Paranormal Activity: The Marked Ones was released in the United States on January 3, 2014 by Paramount Pictures. Made on a budget of $5–9.2 million, it grossed $91 million and received mixed reviews from critics. It was followed by Paranormal Activity: The Ghost Dimension (2015).

== Plot ==
In June 2012, 18-year-old high school graduate Jesse Arista lives with his family in Oxnard, California. In the apartment below lives a mysterious woman named Ana Sanchez, who everyone believes to be a witch. When Ana is found murdered, Jesse and his best friend Hector spot classmate Oscar running from the scene. The two investigate the apartment, where they find black magic items, VHS tapes, and a journal of spells.

After Jesse, Hector and their friend Marisol try out a ritual, paranormal occurrences take place in Jesse's apartment. One night, the trio communicates with an unknown entity through a Simon game. Jesse finds a bite mark on his arm and discovers he has superhuman abilities such as levitation. He later encounters Oscar, who has black eyes and the same bite mark on his arm. Oscar tells Jesse that "something inside them" will take over, and they will harm those they love before disappearing. Oscar then commits suicide.

The group discovers a trapdoor in Ana's apartment, where they find a witch altar and photos of Jesse, his pregnant mother, Ana, Oscar, and Lois. (Note: As depicted in Paranormal Activity 3 (2011).) Jesse encounters the younger versions of Katie and Kristi before being attacked by an unknown force.

Following this, he gradually becomes suicidal and violent, which disturbs Hector and Marisol. The pair meets Arturo, Oscar's criminal brother, who puts them in contact with a girl Oscar had been talking to, Ali Rey. Ali had researched demons after her father Daniel and stepmother Kristi were killed and half-brother Hunter was kidnapped by a possessed Katie (Note: As depicted in Paranormal Activity 2 (2010).). She tells them that Jesse has been "marked" by a worldwide coven of witches called "The Midwives", who have been brainwashing women to give up their firstborn sons to create an army of possessed young men. She gives them an address to where a final ritual is supposed to take place and warns that Jesse will no longer exist if the ritual is completed.

Jesse pushes his grandmother down the stairs, hospitalizing her before he is later kidnapped. Hector, Marisol, Arturo, and his friend Santo go to the address, which turns out to be Lois' house. Coven members attack, but Arturo shoots them as Hector and Marisol run inside, leaving Arturo's fate unknown. Santo and Marisol are killed. Hector is chased by a possessed Jesse, forcing him to go through a strangely marked door.

The door sends Hector back in time to the household of Katie and Micah (Note: As depicted in Paranormal Activity (2007).). Upon seeing Hector in the kitchen, Katie screams for Micah, who assumes the former is an intruder and tackles him. Katie attacks Micah, then stabs him to death with a kitchen knife, therefore showing how the first film ends. While trying to escape the house, Hector is presumably killed by a demonic Jesse. A witch then picks up the camera and turns it off.

=== Original ending ===
The franchise documentary revealed the original ending, which was changed to a new ending in the same house that appeared in the conclusion of Paranormal Activity 3 (2011). After surviving the uproar in the house of Lois, Hector, Arturo and Marisol took Jesse to an abandoned church, from where he supposedly successfully exorcised the demon. But then they are attacked by members of the coven. Minutes later, a police officer arrives there to investigate the disturbances. Jesse suddenly appears with a shotgun and the police shoot him, while the whereabouts of Hector, Marisol and Arturo are unknown.

== Cast ==
- Andrew Jacobs as Jesse Arista
- Jorge Diaz as Hector Estrella
- Gabrielle Walsh as Marisol Vargas
- Renée Victor as Irma Arista
- Noemi Gonzalez as Evette Arista
- David Saucedo as Cesar Arista
- Gloria Sandoval as Ana Sanchez
- Richard Cabral as Arturo Lopez
- Carlos Pratts as Oscar Lopez
- Juan Vasquez as Santo
- Molly Ephraim as Ali Rey
- Katie Featherston as Katie
  - Chloe Csengery as young Katie
- Micah Sloat as Micah
- Jessica Tyler Brown as young Kristi
- Catherine Toribio as Penelope

== Production ==
=== Development and writing ===
The film was set to take place in June 2012 but announced in April 2012, and was first teased in the post-credits scene of Paranormal Activity 4, a scene only presented in theaters. Though the film is targeted to the Latino market, most of its dialogue is not in Spanish. Christopher Landon, who wrote the screenplay for 2007's Disturbia, as well as the three Paranormal Activity sequels, was announced to write and direct the project, which has been described as a "cousin" to the series as opposed to a direct sequel, prequel, or reboot. The film maintains the look of found footage, a style used throughout the Paranormal Activity series.

There are nods to previous Paranormal Activity films. Ali (Molly Ephraim), teenage daughter from the second film, makes a cameo here, as does the box of videotapes featuring childhood footage of the main protagonists in the series, sisters Katie (Katie Featherston) and Kristi (Sprague Grayden), whose lifelong experiences are with a poltergeist-like demon.

=== Filming ===
Filming finished in late July, after producer by Jason Blum confirmed that the film was almost finished shooting. This resulted in the film getting its release date pushed from October 25, 2013, to January 3, 2014.

=== Campaign ===
The studio was running a promotion for users to record their reactions to a video on the site for a chance to win an Xbox One console.

== Release ==
=== Theatrical ===
Paranormal Activity: The Marked Ones was released on January 3, 2014, in U.S., Mexican, and Canadian theaters. The release date was pushed to January due to its longer and larger production.

=== Home media ===
An unrated/extended version, along with the theatrical cut, of The Marked Ones was released on DVD, Blu-ray and Digital HD on April 8, 2014. The unrated cut is roughly 17 minutes longer. The film grossed $2.6 million in home sales.

== Reception ==
=== Box office ===
Despite predictions suggesting that The Marked Ones would open at No. 1 in its debut weekend, the film took a close second to Frozen (in its seventh week) with $18,343,611 at the North American box office.

By the end of its theatrical run, The Marked Ones grossed $32.5 million in North America and $58.4 million in other territories for a worldwide total of $90.9 million.

=== Critical response ===
On Rotten Tomatoes, the film has an approval rating of 40%, based on 82 reviews with an average score of 4.70/10. The site's consensus states: "A change of setting breathes some new life into the franchise, but Paranormal Activity: The Marked Ones fails to provide enough consistent thrills to justify a fifth film in the series". On Metacritic, the film has a score of 42 out of 100, based on 19 reviews, indicating "mixed or average reviews". Audiences polled by CinemaScore gave the film an average grade of "C−" on an A+ to F scale.

The change of setting and tone was primarily praised by critics. Mark Olsen of the Los Angeles Times praised the film, saying that it "feels like a fresh start". Variety critic Andrew Barker celebrated the "welcome diversity and humor" of the film as did Richard Corliss of Time magazine who summarized that the film "provided the familiar cheap thrills but with a salsa tang." Filmink Magazine critic Eden Caceda applauded the humor and action, but claimed that the spinoff "lacks the memorable scares required for this to rate any higher than an above average horror film."

Eric Goldman of IGN wrote that "The Marked Ones is another enjoyable chapter", while HorrorNews.net praised the lead characters, writing "With an appealing pair of friends in the lead, [the film] provides the audience with a cast that they can root for, care for and fear for which serves the story and the series well".

Evan Dickson of Bloody Disgusting was the first to give his impressions on the film, giving it a positive review of 4/5. Stating, "Fun, scary and remarkably cinematic within the found footage conceit, The Marked Ones might be the first Paranormal Activity movie that feels like an event film while you're watching it". Dickson also stated that it was "neck and neck with Paranormal Activity 3".

== Sequel ==
Paranormal Activity: The Marked Ones was followed by Paranormal Activity: The Ghost Dimension, released in 3D on October 23, 2015.
