= A League of Their Own (2022 TV series) =

American television series

- Official promotional poster
- Genre: Comedy drama
- Created by: Will Graham & Abbi Jacobson
- Based on: A League of Their Own by: Lowell Ganz & Babaloo Mandel (Screenplay); by Kim Wilson & Kelly Candaele (Story)
- Starring: Abbi Jacobson; Chanté Adams; D'Arcy Carden; Gbemisola Ikumelo; Roberta Colindrez; Kelly McCormack; Priscilla Delgado; Molly Ephraim; Melanie Field; Kate Berlant
- Music by: We Are Dark Angels; Zachary Dawes and Nick Sena
- Country of origin: United States
- Original language: English
- No. of seasons: 1
- No. of episodes: 8

Production
- Executive producers: Will Graham; Abbi Jacobson; Hailey Wierengo; Jamie Babbit; Desta Tedros Reff
- Producers: Michael Cedar; James Dodson; Michelle Badillo
- Cinematography: Jeffrey Waldron; Dagmar Weaver-Madsen; Cybel Martin
- Editors: Peter CabadaHagan; Jessica Brunetto; Aleshka Ferrero
- Running time: 46–60 minutes
- Production companies: Tender Pictures; Field Trip; Amazon Studios; Sony Pictures Television Studios

Original release
- Network: Amazon Prime Video
- Release: August 12, 2022

A League of Their Own is an American sports comedy drama television series co-created by Will Graham and Abbi Jacobson, who also stars. It is an adaptation of the 1992 film of the same name with new characters and storylines, about the formation of a World War II-era women's professional baseball team. Chanté Adams, D'Arcy Carden, Roberta Colindrez, Gbemisola Ikumelo, Kelly McCormack, Molly Ephraim, Melanie Field, and Priscilla Delgado also star. The series premiered with 8 episodes on August 12, 2022. The series was renewed in March 2023 for a four-episode final season, but in August 2023, Amazon announced that the second season would be scrapped due to delays caused by the WGA strike.

== Premise ==
The series, set in 1943, is about the formation of the Rockford Peaches, a women's team in the nascent All-American Girls Professional Baseball League. While her husband is away at war, Carson Shaw leaves her small town life to pursue her dream of playing professional baseball. Maxine Chapman is an African-American woman obsessed with baseball, who cannot even get people to allow her to try out and struggles to get considered for any baseball team.

== Cast ==
=== Main ===
- Abbi Jacobson as Carson Shaw, the team's catcher. She has an on-going clandestine affair with Greta.
- Chanté Adams as Maxine "Max" Chapman, a talented pitcher trying to break into professional baseball. She hides her lesbian sexuality from friends and family.
- D'Arcy Carden as Greta Gill, a glamorous player of the Rockford Peaches. She encourages Carson to become confident in her sexuality, and in coaching the team.
- Gbemisola Ikumelo as Clance Morgan, Max's best friend and a comic book artist
- Roberta Colindrez as Lupe García, the team's Mexican-American pitcher, referred to as the "Spanish Striker"
- Kelly McCormack as Jess McCready, a hyper-competitive Canadian player. She is constantly being fined by Beverly for wearing pants in public.
- Priscilla Delgado as Esti González, a young Cuban player who speaks almost no English
- Molly Ephraim as Maybelle Fox, a feisty player
- Melanie Field as Jo DeLuca, a fun-loving player and Greta's best friend
- Kate Berlant as Shirley Cohen, a highly anxious player

=== Recurring ===
- Alex Désert as Edgar Chapman, Maxine's supportive father
- Saidah Arrika Ekulona as Toni Chapman, Maxine's mother and a hair salon owner who does not support her dreams to play baseball
- Nat Faxon as Marshall
- Dale Dickey as Beverly, the Rockford Peaches' chaperone
- Aaron Jennings as Guy, Clance's husband
- Kendall Johnson as Gary
- Lea Robinson as Bert Hart, Max's trans man uncle and Toni Chapman's sibling
- Patrice Covington as Gracie, Bert's romantic partner

=== Guest starring ===
- Kevin Dunn as Morris Baker
- Nancy Lenehan as Vivienne Hughes
- Marinda Anderson as Leah
- Nick Offerman as Casey "Dove" Porter, the coach of the Rockford Peaches and a former professional baseball player
- Patrick J. Adams as Charlie, Carson's husband and a soldier on active duty in World War II
- Rosie O'Donnell as Vi, the owner and bartender of an underground gay bar
- Andia Winslow as Esther, a pitcher in Red Wright's All-Stars Negro League
- Marquise Vilsón as Red Wright
- Michael Hitchcock as Tom

In addition, Don Fanelli co-stars as Alan Baker, Lil Frex co-stars as Ana, and Rae Gray co-stars as Terri.

== Episodes ==
No.	Title	Directed by	Written by	Original release date
1	"Batter Up"	Jamie Babbit	Will Graham & Abbi Jacobson	August 12, 2022
In 1943, housewife Carson Shaw arrives in Chicago to try out for the newly formed All-American Girls Professional Baseball League, and meets fellow hopefuls Greta and Jo, friends from New York City. Maxine, an exceptional black pitcher from nearby Rockford, is turned away, and commiserates with her best friend Clance. Drawn to Greta, Carson reveals that she fled her small Idaho town for try-outs after learning her husband Charlie will be returning from the war. Sensing Carson's unease with her marriage, Greta convinces her to drunkenly send Charlie a letter. Teams are announced, with Carson, Greta, and Jo playing for the Rockford Peaches. Working in her mother Toni's salon, Maxine is forced to agree that her dream of playing baseball is unrealistic. In Rockford, the Peaches share a house and bond during a night out on the town. At the same bar, Maxine confronts Gary, a suitor who has joined a local factory's baseball team. Greta kisses Carson, revealing Carson's unspoken secret desire, but leaves with a man despite Carson's attempts to persuade her not to, all witnessed by Maxine. As the Peaches celebrate together, Maxine practices pitching alone.
2	"Find the Gap"	Jamie Babbit	Abbi Jacobson	August 12, 2022
The Peaches begin practice the day before their first game and meet their coach, former Chicago Cubs pitcher Casey "Dove" Porter. Carson wonders if Greta is antagonizing her, and her sister calls to chastise her for running away. Carter confides to Shirley that she feels destined to play baseball. Cosmetics mogul Vivienne Hughes administers "beauty lessons" to the team, explaining that conformity is the price of freedom in a man's world, and cuts players who do not meet standards of femininity. Greta tells Carson that the makeovers are so the team doesn't "look like a bunch of queers," and together they save Jess from being cut by Vivienne. Determined to join Gary's team, the Screws, Maxine tries to apply for a job at the factory but is rebuffed, despite the Roosevelt Order. She helps Clance find crab for a party, which leads them to a White grocery store, where they are ignored until Maxine runs into Carson and demands service. At their first game, the Peaches are forced to endure a catcaller; they lose and Carson overhears Dove disparage the team. Maxine convinces Gary to get her hired at the factory, and at the salon after hours, she welcomes customer Mrs. Turner, with whom she is having an affair.
3	"The Cut Off"	Jamie Babbit	Desta Tedros Reff	August 12, 2022
A sex dream involving Charlie and Greta leaves Carson conflicted. Dove insists that starting pitcher Lupe throw his signature "forkball", despite it straining her arm. Carson leads nightly practices without the injured Lupe, which pays off against the Racine Belles, and she rejects Greta's advances, declaring herself "normal". Maxine and her family attend revival meetings with Mrs. Turner, the preacher's wife. Clance collapses, leading her husband Guy to believe she is pregnant, but she reveals she hid his draft notice. Hired at the factory, Maxine sneaks out for night shifts and ingratiates herself to the Screws' pitcher, who has her join him on the day shift. Before Maxine can tell her family, her mother reveals an expensive neon sign for the salon with both their names. Maxine lashes out at Mrs. Turner, and tearfully admits to her mother that she has a new job. Benched by Dove after Lupe discovers the secret practices, Carson confronts him for not recognizing the team's potential. After chaperoning Greta on a date and receiving a call from Charlie, Carson acts on her feelings, sneaking away with Greta for a passionate embrace.
4	"Switch Hitter"	Ayoka Chenzira	Michelle Badillo	August 12, 2022
Carson and Greta continue their trysts as the Peaches embark on a series of away games. Greta, experienced with married women, assures Carson that their time together is temporary. The Peaches win against the Kenosha Comets, but Dove leaves suddenly, and team chaperone Sgt. Beverly appoints Carson and Lupe as substitute coaches. When the Peaches flounder in their first night game, Carson realizes the Comets are cheating by turning off outfield lights, and Lupe's rulebook knowledge forces the umpire to intervene. Clance joins the factory, and the Screws' coach agrees to let Maxine try out. However, she learns Gary is already the new pitcher, and overhears her parents argue that she may become an "invert" like her estranged aunt, Bertie. Maxine fails to impress the Screws, while Clance comforts Guy on his last night before shipping out. The Peaches struggle against the Blue Sox, bringing Lupe and Carson to blows; Beverly forfeits the game, and reveals Dove left to coach the Baltimore Orioles. Back in Rockford, Carson is kept at a distance by Greta and is confronted by Maxine, who has not forgotten her and Greta's first kiss.
5	"Back Footed"	Katrelle Kindred	Mfoniso Udofia	August 12, 2022
Maxine blackmails Carson into testing her pitching, but is still struggling. In the wake of the Peaches' brawl, Carson is named the new coach, and she diverts Shirley's homophobic suspicions about Jo. Maxine leaves home to stay with Clance, helping her cope with Guy's absence. Carson offers to coach Maxine, suggesting she is experiencing the yips. Visiting her aunt, Maxine is overwhelmed to find Bertie living as a man, married to Maxine's new coworker Gracie. Carson's attempt to unite the Peaches backfires, and she cries in front of the team, prompting Beverly to guide her toward becoming a stronger leader. Grappling with her identity, Maxine allows her mother to style her hair, and has disappointing sex with Gary. A newly assertive Carson takes charge of the Peaches, but they lose against the Blue Sox, and she confides her feelings for Greta to Maxine, who remains frustrated by her lack of opportunity. Carson speaks honestly to her team, bringing them closer together, and a motivated Lupe pitches a winning game. With Jo's encouragement, Greta rekindles her relationship with Carson. Maxine visits Bertie and Gracie, asking for a short haircut.
6	"Stealing Home"	Will Graham	Will Graham	August 12, 2022
The Peaches enjoy their fans' support, but must sweep their remaining games to reach the championships. The Major Leagues may shut down, with the Girls League taking over their ballparks. However, the league's owner wants to trade the Peaches' best players to the more likely championship teams. Maxine spends time with Gracie and Bertie, who makes Maxine a men's suit, but she is unable to hide her shame about his identity. Appealing to the owner's nephew Alan not to break up the Peaches, Carson suspects Lupe is arranging to be traded. She follows her to a secret gay bar, only to realize Lupe is on a date with a rival player, accompanied by fellow queer teammate Jess. Meeting the establishment's owner Vi and her wife, Carson marvels at the community built by "friends of Dorothy". The team enjoys a winning streak, and Carson takes Greta on a date. After a heartfelt conversation with Carson, Maxine wears the suit in her own fashion to Bertie and Gracie's party of likeminded friends. Greta and Carson bring Jo to Vi's bar, which is violently raided by police, and Carson narrowly escapes with a deeply shaken Greta.
7	"Full Count"	Silas Howard	Sanaz Toossi	August 12, 2022
Jo is beaten and arrested, and Beverly has her traded to the Blue Sox, who will face the Peaches in the championships. Maxine discovers Esther — a woman she connected with at Bertie's party — is the pitcher for the All-Stars, a barnstorming team playing against the Screws. The All-Stars have been paid to lose, but Esther fakes an injury, allowing Maxine to replace her on the mound. Maxine throws an impressive game, sharing a secret kiss with Esther, and is invited to join the All-Stars on the road. Lupe and Jess track down the missing Esti, their oft-excluded teammate from Cuba, convincing her to return. Carson is surprised by the arrival of Charlie, and joins him at his hotel for a warm but awkward reunion. She finds her letter outlining her unhappiness with their marriage, which he had claimed he never received, and he reveals that he was hospitalized with effort syndrome. They reach an understanding about their life together, but Carson leaves to find Greta at the train station. She convinces her to stay for the Peaches' sake, but Shirley has found the farewell letter Greta left for Carson.
8	"Perfect Game"	Anya Adams	Abbi Jacobson & Will Graham	August 12, 2022
With the championship series underway, Carson asks Charlie to return to Idaho, promising to rejoin him in a week. Maxine's success appears in The Chicago Defender, and she and Carson share a goodbye game of catch. Carson rallies the Peaches, who inscribe their names in the locker room; no longer concerned about her secret, she urges Shirley to confront her narrow-mindedness. Vivienne Hughes offers Greta an offseason job in her New York office, while Shirley reconciles with Carson, overcoming several of her anxieties. Maxine remains at odds with her mother, who is later confronted by Bertie, urging her to let Maxine live her own life. Departing with Esther and her new team, Maxine bids farewell to Clance, who chooses not to reveal she is pregnant, with Toni's support. In the final game, Jo hits the series-winning home run, but is injured at first base. Her former teammates help her round the bases in a victory for the Blue Sox, but a joyous last reunion for the Peaches. Carson shares a final kiss with Greta, deciding not to go with her but promising to see each other next season, only to find Charlie was watching.

== Production ==
=== Development ===
In 2017 Abbi Jacobson and Will Graham approached Sony Pictures with the idea to reboot the late Penny Marshall's 1992 film A League of Their Own. Graham loved the film growing up and approached Jacobson with the idea for a contemporary reboot, expanding it to explore race and sexuality. Graham and Jacobson contacted Marshall (before her death in 2018) and Geena Davis to ask for their blessing before moving forward with the project.

Graham and Jacobson decided to expand the topics explored to include racism in the league as well as the stories of queer players. They hired a researcher to gather detailed information about the All-American Girls Professional Baseball League, and met with surviving players. Max's character is an amalgamation of three real-life Black women players from the Negro leagues: Toni Stone, Mamie Johnson, and Connie Morgan.

In March 2018, it was announced that the series was in development at Amazon. It is the second television adaptation of A League of Their Own, following a short-lived 1993 CBS series.

Jamie Babbit directed the pilot episode, which was shot in southern California. Babbit, Hailey Wierengo, and Elizabeth Koe are executive producers along with writer-producers Graham and Jacobson, who also co-stars. The series is Jacobson's second major project following Broad City, which ran for five seasons.

On August 6, 2020, it was announced that Amazon had ordered the one-hour comedy series. On March 14, 2023, Amazon Prime Video renewed the series for a four-episode second and final season. On August 18, 2023, Amazon scrapped the second season, citing the 2023 Writers Guild of America strike as their reason.

=== Casting ===
On February 14, 2020, D'Arcy Carden, Chanté Adams, Roberta Colindrez, Gbemisola Ikumelo, Kelly McCormack, Melanie Field, and Priscilla Delgado were announced. Nick Offerman was cast in June 2021 as Casey "Dove" Porter, the team's coach. Molly Ephraim and Kate Berlant were cast in recurring roles. In July 2021, Rosie O'Donnell announced she is set to guest star as a bartender at a local gay bar in the series. On July 6, 2021, Saidah Ekulona was announced as a recurring cast member. In September 2021, Patrick J. Adams, Patrice Covington, Lea Robinson, Andia Winslow, Rae Gray, and Lil Frex were cast in recurring capacities. On November 8, 2021, it was announced that Nat Faxon, Kevin Dunn, Marquise Vilsón, Marinda Anderson, Don Fanelli, and Nancy Lenehan were cast in recurring roles.

=== Filming ===
After the pilot was shot in Los Angeles, filming was delayed due to the onset of the COVID-19 pandemic. Production took place in Pittsburgh, Pennsylvania, from mid-July through October 2021. Filming officially began on July 11, 2021, on the south side of Pittsburgh in the old Schwartz Market. Additional filming locations included Ambridge, the Fifth Street Park, Aliquippa at Morrell Field, and the city of Greensburg's Amtrak train station.

== Release ==
A world premiere screening took place at Tribeca Film Festival on June 13, 2022. To promote the show, a 30th anniversary screening of the original film was held in Los Angeles by Cinespia on August 7. The series premiered on Prime Video on August 12, 2022.

== Reception ==
The review aggregator website Rotten Tomatoes gave the show an approval rating of 94% based on reviews from 83 critics, with an average rating of 7.7/10. The website's critics consensus reads, "A League of Their Own puts some spin on its pitch, lobbing a serialized expansion that swerves dangerously close to anachronism but hits home thanks to a roster filled with all-stars and a field rich with possibilities." Metacritic gave the series a weighted average score of 70 out of 100 based on 32 critics, indicating "generally favorable reviews".

Jenna Scherer rated the series an A− for The A.V. Club and stated: "That the show effortlessly weaves this diverse tapestry of women's stories is no easy feat. But League is funny as hell to boot, using a quasi-contemporary conversation style and modern slang ("Fucking fuckers!") that feels oddly at home in the 1940s setting." Autostraddle critic Kayla Kumari Upadhyaya wrote positively about the LGBTQ+ content in the series: "Thirty years after the original, this story finally gets to be as gay as it should be...And it's not just the sheer number of queer characters but also the great space and weight given to queerness within just about every single plotline and subplot of this new A League of Their Own that truly makes up for the lack of explicitly gay content in the original movie — and then some." Daniel D'Addario of Variety wrote that the show "feels a bit overextended" but hailed the acting: "there are strong performances throughout a deep ensemble and a winning eagerness to be openly, earnestly emotional." Linda Holmes of NPR also praised the acting and noted: "D'Arcy Carden, who a lot of TV audiences will mostly know as Janet ("not a robot" but ... kind of a robot) on The Good Place, is warm and bold and quite dreamy in this role — deeply human, in fact." In a less positive review, Ben Travers rated A League of Their Own a B− in IndieWire and wrote that splitting the narrative between two parallel story lines "creates pacing issues where things like the team's inaugural baseball game gets surprisingly short shrift" but also noted "most of its first season problems are common issues for freshman TV shows, and the Prime Video original smooths out with each passing episode." Peter Travers of ABC News also stated that the series "lacks the warm, gooey center of Marshall’s feel-good movie" but praised it as "refreshingly queer and diverse".

== Awards and nominations ==
- 2022 – Honoree, Critics Choice Association Women's Committee Seal of Female Empowerment in Entertainment
- 2022 – Honoree, Human Rights Campaign National Visibility Award
- 2022 – Honoree, National Council of La Raza Voice and Visibility Award (for Abbi Jacobson)

Year	Award	Category	Nominee(s)	Result	Ref.
2023	GLAAD Media Awards	Outstanding New TV Series	A League of Their Own	Won	
2023	Independent Spirit Awards	Best Supporting Performance in a New Scripted Series	Gbemisola Ikumelo	Nominated	
2023	NAACP Image Awards	Outstanding Costume Design (Television or Film)	Trayce Gigi Field	Nominated	
