= Trace (magazine) =

TRACE magazine
- Type: Quarterly Transcultural Styles & Ideas
- Format: Magazine
- Editor-in-chief: Claude Grunitzky
- Founded: 1997
- Language: English
- Headquarters: New York City
- Price: US$7.99 £3.95
- Website: Trace magazine

Trace is a quarterly, internationally distributed magazine with the tagline, "transcultural styles + ideas". It focuses on urban culture. It was founded in 1996 by Claude Grunitzky and sold to Alliance Trace Media in 2003.

== History ==
Trace magazine was the successor to True magazine, which the Togo-born Grunitzky had started in 1995. When True failed after less than a year, Grunitzky, then aged 25, launched Trace, choosing the name for its inquisitive connotations and its similarity to the word "race".

The magazine featured on its cover some of the most high-profile black celebrities of the day, including Snoop Dogg, Mary J. Blige, Biggie Smalls, Diddy, Iman, and Naomi Campbell.

The first cover featured Snoop Dogg and was distributed in the UK, France, Germany, Sweden, the US, Australia and Japan. In 1998, after 15 UK issues, Trace moved its headquarters to the US. Grunitzky cited at least part of the reason for this as the desire for a more accessible and dynamic kind of publication than was possible in London at that time.

The magazine struggled initially; at one point, financial backing for the cash-strapped publication came via a $110,000 cheque from The RZA of the Wu-Tang Clan. However, it has since become a well-respected voice within the urban style scene. Its cover stars have included celebrities including the models Naomi Campbell, Devon Aoki, Iman and Tyra Banks, the actresses Thandiwe Newton and Rosario Dawson, the boxer Mike Tyson, and the musicians Diddy, Common, IAM, DMX, Erykah Badu, Kelis, Lauryn Hill, Missy Elliott, Foxy Brown, Omega Sirius Moon, Gwen Stefani, Notorious BIG, Sean Paul, Rihanna, Mary J. Blige, Lenny Kravitz, Alicia Keys, Mariah Carey, Sisqo, Eve and Snoop Dogg. It has featured photography by Marc Baptiste, Ellen Von Unwerth, Albert Watson and Juergen Teller.

It is credited with being amongst the first publications to have discovered the artists Mary J. Blige, Alicia Keys, Rosario Dawson and Tiffany Limos.

In November 2007, Trace marked its tenth anniversary with an issue published with three different covers.

== Features ==
In its early years, Trace focused principally on hip hop culture, reflected in the large number of rap, hip-hop and R&B artists featured on and within its covers. Around the early 1990s, it shifted to a broader approach, incorporating more high-fashion and travel features, and appealing to a wider range of racial and cultural backgrounds. Grunitzky cited his growing interest in the concept of "transculturalism", a term denoting the increasing prominence of individuals who "transcend their initial culture, in order to explore, examine and infiltrate foreign cultures". Accordingly, later issues included "Brasil 2000", "Destination: Japan" and "High on Mexico". Nonetheless, since 1998 it has devoted one issue per year to the catchphrase "Black Girls Rule!".

In 2003, Grunitzky sold the magazine to Alliance Trace Media (ATM) that was funded by the Goldman Sachs Group and individual investors. ATM was organized with 2 divisions: the magazine division led by Grunitzky and the audiovisual division led by Olivier Laouchez. Richard Wayner, former banker at Goldman Sachs joined ATM to lead the holding and support the magazine division. In April 2003, the first Trace branded TV network was launched by Olivier Laouchez. Then, in 2004 and 2005, Grunitzky and Wayner left ATM and Laouchez was appointed chairman & CEO of the Group with the mission to develop the audiovisual and digital activities worldwide.

== Mentions in pop culture ==
- Trace appears in Quentin Tarantino's 2007 film Grindhouse. Someone goes into a store to buy a copy of Vogue and as they browse they shelves the camera pans past the Alicia Keys Trace issue.
- Trace was featured prominently in the Spike Lee movie She Hate Me.
