= Grunitzky =

Grunitzky is a Slavic masculine surname, its feminine counterpart is Grunitzka or Grunitzkaya. Notable people with the surname include:

- Claude Grunitzky (born 1971), Togolese journalist, editor and entrepreneur, relative of Nicolas
- Nicolas Grunitzky (1913–1969), Togolese politician of German and Togolese descent
