= Paranormal Activity 2 =

2010 film by Tod Williams

- Theatrical release poster
- Directed by: Tod Williams
- Screenplay by: Michael R. Perry; Christopher Landon; Tom Pabst
- Story by: Michael R. Perry
- Based on: Paranormal Activity by Oren Peli
- Produced by: Jason Blum; Oren Peli
- Starring: Sprague Grayden; Brian Boland; Molly Ephraim; Seth Ginsberg; Micah Sloat; Katie Featherston
- Cinematography: Michael Simmonds
- Edited by: Gregory Plotkin
- Production companies: Blumhouse Productions; Solana Films; Room 101, Inc.
- Distributed by: Paramount Pictures
- Release date: October 22, 2010
- Running time: 91 minutes
- Country: United States
- Language: English
- Budget: $3 million
- Box office: $177.5 million

Paranormal Activity 2 is a 2010 American found footage supernatural horror film directed by Tod Williams, and written by Michael R. Perry, Christopher Landon and Tom Pabst. It is the second installment of the Paranormal Activity film series. The film mostly acts as a prequel to the 2007 film Paranormal Activity, beginning two months before the events depicted in the original film, although it is set over a longer period of time and eventually concludes after the first film's ending.

The film stars Sprague Grayden, Brian Boland, Molly Ephraim, Seth Ginsberg, Micah Sloat and Katie Featherston, the latter two reprising their roles as Micah and Katie from the first film. The film follows the family of Katie's sister Kristi, who start suspecting that a supernatural entity is tormenting them.

Paranormal Activity 2 was released in theaters at midnight on October 22, 2010, in the United States, the United Kingdom, Canada, Mexico, Brazil, Argentina, Poland and Ireland. It received mixed reviews from critics and was a box-office success, grossing over $177 million against a $3 million budget. An unrated version of the film was also released.

== Plot ==
In August 2006, a "burglary" occurs at the home of Kristi and Daniel Rey, trashing their house and leaving only their infant son Hunter's bedroom untouched. The only thing stolen is a necklace that Kristi's sister, Katie, gave to her. Despite this, the family contact a home security company and have them install security cameras around the house. Martine, the Latin American family housekeeper and nanny, senses "evil spirits" in the house and burns sage to rid the house of them, and Daniel fires her for doing so.

Kristi also believes that the house is haunted, and she and Katie talk about being tormented by a demon when they were children. Daniel, however, initially dismisses her claim despite footage of strange occurrences around the house. Daniel's daughter from a prior marriage, Ali, begins investigating the mysterious happenings; she discovers that humans can make deals with demons for wealth or power by forfeiting the soul of their first-born son, but if the deal is not fulfilled, the demon will remain attached to the family until a son is born. She also learns that Hunter is the first male to be born in Kristi's family since the 1930s.

The violence escalates, as the family's German Shepherd, Abby, is attacked by the demon and apparently suffers from a seizure. As Daniel and Ali take Abby to the veterinarian, Kristi is attacked and dragged into the basement by the demon, who possesses her. The following day, Ali is left home with Kristi, unaware she is possessed. Soon, Ali hears a scratching sound from the basement door and opens it to find scratches and sees a word, meus (Latin for "Mine"), etched into it. A strange bite mark on her leg and the footage of Kristi's attack motivates Daniel to contact Martine for assistance, and she prepares a cross to exorcise the demon; Kristi will have no memory of having been possessed. Daniel plans to pass the demon onto Katie so that Kristi and Hunter will be saved, despite Ali's protests.

That night, when Daniel tries to use the cross on Kristi, she attacks him and the house lights all go out. Using the handheld camera's night vision, he walks around the shaking house into the basement, where he is attacked by Kristi; he retaliates against her with the cross, causing her to collapse and the house to shake violently before settling down. Daniel puts Kristi to bed and with Martine, burns a photo of a young Katie, passing the demon onto her.

Three weeks later, Katie visits and explains that strange things have begun happening at her house. On October 9, the night after Katie's boyfriend Micah is killed, (Note: As depicted in Paranormal Activity (2007).) a possessed and bloodstained Katie breaks into the Rey house, kills Daniel and Kristi, and abducts Hunter. A title card explains that Ali found her parents' bodies when she came home from a school trip, and that Katie and Hunter have vanished.

== Cast ==
- Sprague Grayden as Kristi Rey
- Brian Boland as Daniel Rey, Kristi's husband
- Molly Ephraim as Ali Rey, Dan's daughter
- Katie Featherston as Katie, Kristi's older sister
- Micah Sloat as Micah, Katie's boyfriend
- Seth Ginsberg as Brad, Ali's boyfriend
- Vivis as Martine, the nanny / housekeeper
- Jackson Xenia Prieto and William Juan Prieto as Hunter Rey, Dan and Kristi's infant son

== Production ==
=== Development ===
Coming after the box office success of Paranormal Activity, distributor Paramount Pictures quickly pursued a sequel. Kevin Greutert, director of Saw VI, was slated to direct while Michael R. Perry was set to write the film in January 2010. Oren Peli, the writer and director of the first film, was not expected to be directly involved with the sequel, but approved of Perry's story. Days after his hiring, Greutert was suddenly pulled from the project after Twisted Pictures and Lionsgate used a clause in Greutert's contract to direct Saw 3D; only two weeks away from filming. Peli, who remained on board as a producer, was ruled out as a viable replacement due to his obligations to Area 51. Brian De Palma and Akiva Goldsman were early candidates for the directors chair. Goldsman instead became involved as an executive producer and would help shape the story, while De Palma met with Perry and Jason Blum. Circumstances changed and De Palma moved on, leading to Paramount looking toward Brad Anderson and Greg McLean. By March 2010, Katie Featherston and Micah Sloat were expected to reprise their roles. By the end of the month, Tod Williams was tapped to direct the film with production set to begin that May.

=== Filming ===
Production on Paranormal Activity 2 began without a completed script. Three weeks into filming, the footage was said to be "disastrous"; leading to a writer's room being assembled and production shutting down. Christopher Landon, one of the writers brought in, gave notes on the footage which prompted a studio executive to hire Landon and another unnamed writer to write half of the film. The pair's screenplay failed to satisfy the studio, and one final attempt by Landon alone was enough to reinvigorate the production.

== Marketing ==
In a special promotion set up by the film's producers, participants had a chance to win a free movie ticket if they were in the top twenty cities to demand the film, via Eventful.com. The teaser trailer was shown with The Twilight Saga: Eclipse upon its release on June 30, 2010. Cinemark pulled the trailer from several Texas theaters after receiving complaints that it was too frightening. A second theatrical trailer was released in October 2010 and was attached to Devil, My Soul to Take and Jackass 3D.

== Release ==
The film was released in the United States on October 22, 2010. The film was made available in IMAX format as well as standard.

=== Critical response ===
On Rotten Tomatoes, the film has an approval rating of 58% based on reviews from 138 critics, with an average rating of 5.6/10. The consensus states that "Paranormal Activity 2 doesn't cover any new ground, but its premise is still scary—and in some respects, it's a better film than the original." On Metacritic, the film has received an weighted average score of 53 out of 100, based on reviews from 23 critics, indicating "mixed or average reviews". Audiences polled by CinemaScore gave it a grade B.

Artistdirect called it "one of the scariest films of all time". Entertainment Weekly said the film "blends [shock and suspense] into what might be called shockpense"; reviewer Owen Gleiberman called it a "shivery-skillful, highly worthy fear-factor sequel" and wrote, "The images all point down, which is subtly disquieting, and each one is composed with enough wide-angle space and distance, and enough nooks and crannies, so that even when nothing is happening, the often dead-silent shots tend to grow scarier the more you look at them… It made me jump, sweat, and chew my fingernails." Roger Ebert, who awarded the original film three and a half stars, awarded Paranormal Activity 2 one-and-a-half out of a possible four.

=== Box office ===
Paranormal Activity 2 broke the record for biggest midnight gross for an R-rated film with $6.3 million, beating the previous record-holder Watchmen by $4.6 million, and broke the record for biggest opening for a horror movie of all time. On its opening day, Paranormal Activity 2 placed number one at the box office, making $20.1 million and finished with a total of $41.5 million estimated over the weekend, placing first at the box office. It has currently grossed $84.8 million in North America and $92.8 million overseas, giving the film a worldwide total of $177.5 million.

=== Home media ===
Paranormal Activity 2 was released on DVD/Blu-ray and video on demand/pay-per-view on February 8, 2011, and includes an unrated director's cut and deleted scenes. Paranormal Activity 2 was placed at #1 for top Blu-ray and rental sales for its first week of being out. The film grossed $20.4 million in home sales. In January 2012, the first three films in the series were edited in chronological order and released as a single film on digital platforms under the title Paranormal Activity: The Chronology.

== Prequel and sequels ==
The third film of the series, Paranormal Activity 3, was released in theaters on October 21, 2011. It serves as a prequel, set 18 years prior to the events of the first two films.

The fourth film, Paranormal Activity 4, was released on October 18, 2012. It was planned to take place several years after the events of Paranormal Activity 2. Katie and Hunter have reappeared and live in a house across the street from Alex and Wyatt. Alex and her family begin experiencing paranormal events taking place in their own home. "Toby" is mentioned once in the film, said by Ben. Although a box office success, Paranormal Activity 4 was a critical failure.

A fifth film, Paranormal Activity: The Marked Ones, and a sixth film, Paranormal Activity: The Ghost Dimension, were released in 2014 and 2015 respectively. A seventh film, Paranormal Activity: Next of Kin, was released in 2021.

== See also ==
- List of ghost films
