= The Aggressives (2005 American film) =

- Directed by: Daniel Peddle
- Produced by: Daniel Peddle; Jenny Tsai; Calvin Wilson
- Cinematography: Daniel Peddle; Jeanny Tsai
- Edited by: Yvette Wojciechowski
- Music by: Ryan Donowho; Stephen Thompson
- Distributed by: Seventh Art Releasing
- Release date: June 3, 2005
- Running time: 75 minutes
- Country: United States
- Language: English

The Aggressives is a 2005 American documentary film produced and directed by Daniel Peddle. It is an exposé on the subculture of masculine presenting black people and their "femme" counterparts. Filmed over five years in New York City, the featured subjects share their dreams, secrets, and deepest fears.

== Synopsis ==
This documentary intimately follows the lives of six subjects for about five years starting in 1997. Through their experiences, the documentary explores gender, sexuality, race, and class. The aggressives are young, queer, masculine presenting and identifying people of color living in New York City, including: Marquise, Rjai, Tiffany, Flo, Octavia, and Kisha. The subjects' experiences reflect the challenges of marginalized existence as queer people of color: including jail time, hysterectomies, children, military service, prison sex, construction work, competing in “balls" within the LGBTQIA+ community, and achieving success despite disapproval by their families and society at large. The subjects included within the documentary differ from each other in gender expression:

- Marquise, a trans man, straps his chest flat with duct-tape, bites his teeth to develop a stronger jaw-line, and has a deep voice. Marquise enlists in the US Army and on the eve of his departure, speaks about how he will navigate living within the female compound while identifying as a transgender man. At the end of the film, it is revealed that Marquise could not be found by the time of the film's release. Marquise Vilsón has appeared in numerous TV series episodes, as the subject of a documentary short film (“Marquise”), and in Philip Dawson’s off-Broadway play Charm (2017) among other acting roles.
- Kisha was discovered by a fashion photographer while working her job as a messenger; she radically transforms between her aggressiveness and femininity as a model. She describes herself as a femme-aggressive and navigates androgyny in the modeling world
- Flo is an Asian, masculine-presenting person heavily influenced by the Queer Black and Latino ball scene. He often judges at balls.
- Rjai is a ball fixture; consistently preparing, competing, and winning in multiple categories. He appeared on a talk-show and as a result has interest from various women.
- Octavia is raw in their gender expression, dealing with prison and trying to turn his life around. They also are a mother and speak about their queer blackfem motherhood.
- Tiffany blurs the labels and norms of gender and sexual identity.

The subjects are asked, "What does being an Aggressive mean to you?" Their responses deal with masculine-presenting traits and identities and unstated rules about gender expression.

The subjects' relationships with their mothers are explored. Some mothers accept them, others, including Octavia's mother, disapprove and/or hope that they will move past this "phase". The subjects are unapologetic about their identity, expression, and presentation. The film also explores experiences with class as the subjects deal with financial hardship.

While not explicitly addressed, race, specifically blackness, is tied to the "aggressive" identity. All of the people within the film except Flo are black. Their self-identification as "aggressive" develops a gender category for black masculine people in the context of the Queer Black and Latino ballroom. Even though Flo identifies as an Aggressive, the film questions whether this identity is one they can claim and inhabit. The film presents Flo as fetishizing blackness, made evident by their comments on black women and use of the n-word. The film finds Flo's identity to be a problematic attempt to perform and inhabit blackness.

== Analysis ==
In Queer Times, Black Futures (2019), scholar Kara Keeling provides an in-depth analysis of The Aggressives, situating the documentary within broader discussions of Black queer temporality, gender performativity, and the politics of visibility. Keeling highlights how the film documents lives and identities that defy normative gender and sexual classifications, particularly through its focus on individuals who identify as "aggressives" or "AGs"—a term shaped by cultural, racial, and prison contexts and not easily contained within mainstream LGBT categories such as lesbian, butch, or transgender.

A central figure in Keeling’s analysis is the documentary subject "M—", who joins the military during the film, only to disappear afterward, a move Keeling reads as a political act—a rejection of the usual systems that try to define and control people — like the state or the documentary itself. This disappearance, she argues, unsettles the film’s attempt at narrative closure and linear time, creating what Keeling calls a "rupture" that gestures toward a speculative Black queer futurity, or what she terms "poetry from the future" (a phrase drawn from Marx and Fanon).

Keeling contends that The Aggressives reveals the tension between the desire for visibility—often equated with social validation—and the violent conditions under which such visibility is produced and policed, especially for racialized gender-nonconforming subjects. She draws connections between the documentary’s temporal structure and the conditions of mass incarceration, militarism, and queer subcultural formation, framing the film as both a record of lived experiences and a challenge to mainstream ideas of what a life is supposed to be. As such, The Aggressives is read not only as a document of a subculture but also as a critical site of Black queer political possibility and affective resistance to normative histories and futures.

== Reception ==
Karman Kregloe from the website OUTspoken praised the director for providing a platform for the women to define themselves and share the ways in which they "face marginalization with humor, bravado and courage".

According to Ciara Healy, the documentary does not make clear the distinction between the label "aggressive" versus "butch", especially how race is significant in regards to either, leaving its audience wondering what is the difference. "The Aggressives is highly recommended mainly because it is provocative; as a tool for generating discussion it can work really well. The subjects filmed provide thoughtful and insightful descriptions of their gendered experience which alone would make this documentary a good resource for gender studies classes that explore gender roles and identity."

On Rotten Tomatoes, it has a score of 92%, based on reviews from 12 critics, as of 2026.

=== Awards ===
- Best Documentary from the 2005 Rhode Island International Film Festival
- Juried Award from the 2005 Seattle Lesbian & Gay Film Festival
- Audience Award from the 2005 Philadelphia International Gay & Lesbian Film Festival.

== See also ==
- Beyond the Aggressives: 25 Years Later
