= Derek Milman =

American actor (born 1979)

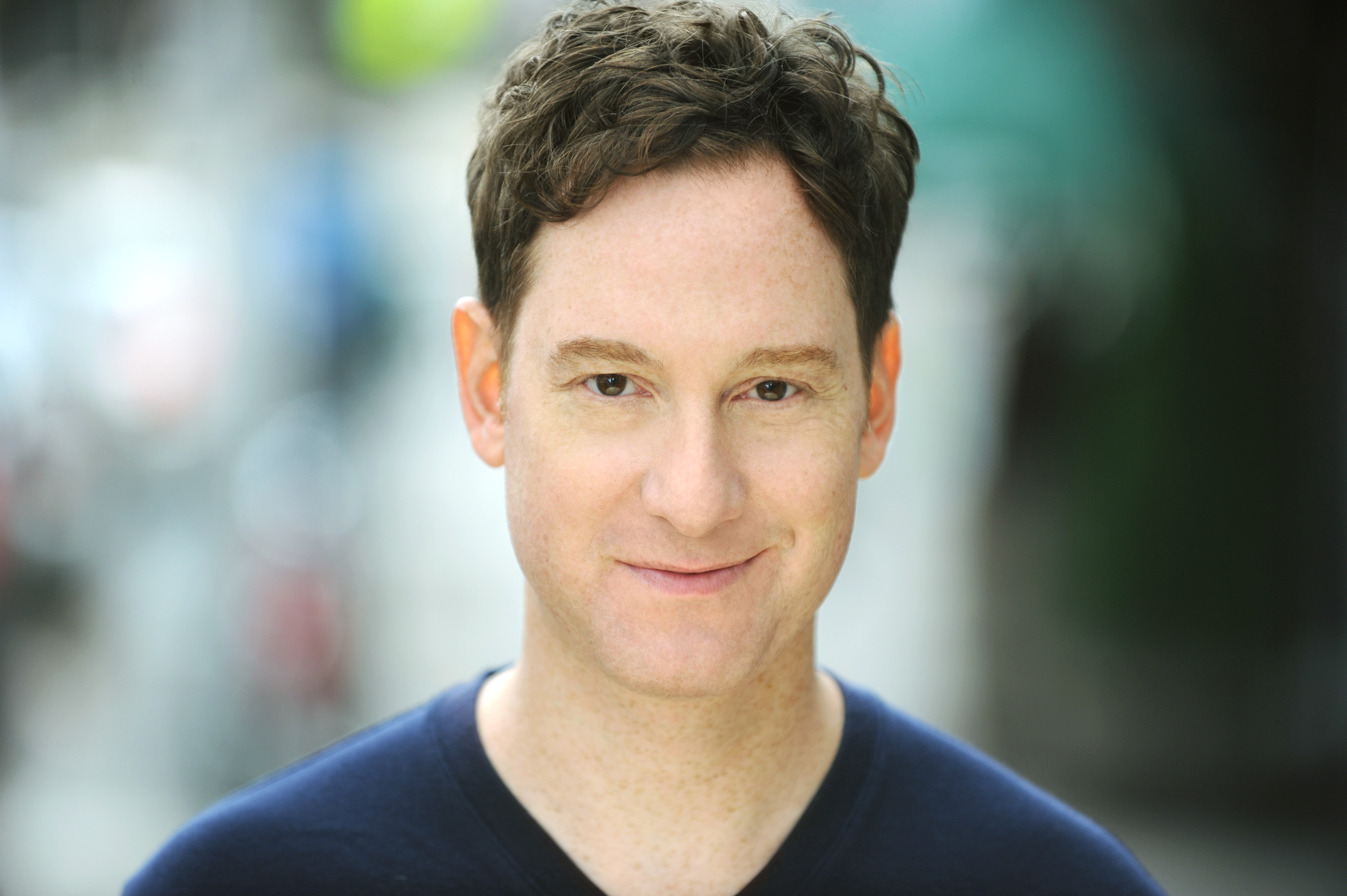
- Born: Derek Andrew Milman; March 21, 1979 (age 47); New York City, U.S.
- Occupations: Actor, writer
- Years active: 2002-present
- Website: www.derekmilman.com

Derek Andrew Milman (born March 21, 1979) is an American actor and novelist.

== Early life ==
Milman was born in New York City, and raised in Westchester County, NY. He wrote an underground humor magazine called Wasting Time in his youth, and sold it to local stores, prompting a profile in The New York Times. Milman attended Northwestern University, then received his Master of Fine Arts in acting at the Yale School of Drama. Milman began his career as a playwright; his first play, "A Visionary Drowns", which he had written while a student at Northwestern, premiered in New York, Off-Broadway, when he was 22.

== Acting ==
Milman has numerous stage credits, including originating the role of Bill Wade in the 1999 New York premiere of Never Swim Alone, by Daniel MacIvor, and the role of Reed Williams in Cats Talk Back, which was a success at the New York City Fringe Festival, in 2002. Milman has also worked at the SoHo Repertory Theater, Yale Repertory Theater, and twice with playwright Israel Horovitz at the Gloucester Stage Company. In 2003 Milman gained wide exposure as "The New Guy" in the popular Wendy's Television commercial.

Milman's television credits include roles on The Sopranos, Law & Order: Criminal Intent, and the short-lived Love Monkey. In 2007, he appeared in the HBO miniseries, John Adams as the ill-fated Lieutenant William Barron. In the spring of 2009, Milman was cast in the pilot episode of The Wonderful Maladys for HBO, starring Sarah Michelle Gellar. Milman went on to appear in The Wolf of Wall Street, and on television in Orange is the New Black. Milman played Barry Klein in the 2018 season of HULU's The Path.

== Writing ==
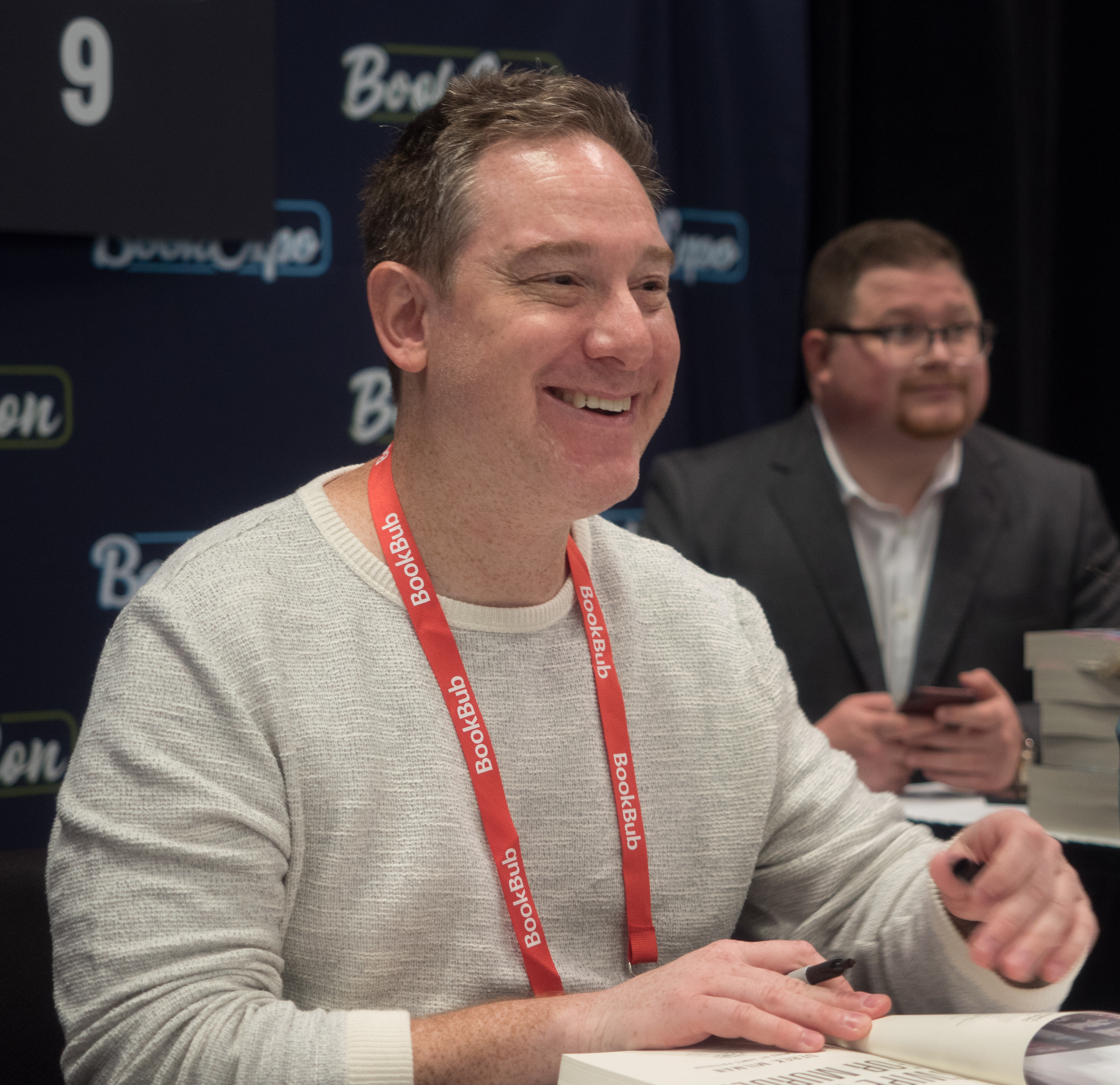
Milman signing books at BookExpo America in 2019

In late 2016 it was announced Derek's debut Young Adult novel, Scream All Night, would be published by Balzer + Bray, an imprint of HarperCollins. The novel was released on July 24, 2018. It is about a young man, legally emancipated from his eccentric family, who inherits their failing B-horror movie studio and must save the family legacy, even if that means facing the monsters—both on screen and off—that have haunted him since his escape. The novel received positive reviews, including a starred review in Publishers Weekly.

Milman has said the novel was loosely inspired by Hammer Horror films, during the period of time they were filming at Bray Studios. The novel was also the subject, briefly, of a Hollywood bidding war.

Milman's sophomore novel, Swipe Right For Murder, was published on August 6, 2019, by James Patterson's imprint at Little, Brown, with a foreword by James Patterson. The novel is about a gay teen, seventeen-year-old Aidan Jamison, who gets caught up in a case of mistaken identity after a hookup goes wrong. The novel received rave reviews, including a starred review from Booklist.

In January 2023, it was announced that after a five-year hiatus, Milman's third novel, A Darker Mischief, would be published by Scholastic.
