= Tiq Milan =

American writer and public speaker

- Born: July 14; Buffalo, New York, U.S.
- Occupation: Writer • public speaker • activist
- Employer: GLAAD
- Known for: LGBTQ activism
- Spouse: Kim Katrin Milan (m. 2014; div. 2019)
- Partner: Jodie Patterson (2019-present)
- Website: tiqmilan.com

Tiq Milan (born July 14 in Buffalo, New York) is an American writer, public speaker, activist, and strategic media consultant. Past positions have included national spokesperson for GLAAD and senior media strategist of national news for GLAAD, and mentor and teacher at the Hetrick-Martin Institute (an LGBTQ youth nonprofit organization in NYC). His advocacy, LGBTQ activism, and journalism has been recognized nationally.

== Media training and advocacy work ==
Through his work at GLAAD, Milan has trained national transgender advocates like CeCe McDonald, Geena Rocero, and participants of MTV's "Laverne Cox Presents: The T-Word to develop messaging and best practices for crafting their stories and maximizing impact. He has also strategized with national news media outlets about fair and accurate reporting on transgender people.

He is a national spokesperson discussing the latest developments in transgender rights, and has been featured on CNN's Reliable Resources, The Katie Couric Show, MSNBC's Ronan Farrow Daily, Steven Petrow's, "Civilities," MTV News, NewsNation with Tamron Hall, Out There with Thomas Roberts, and is a regular contributor on HuffPost Live.

Milan and his ex-wife, Kim Katrin Milan, were featured in Out's LOVE Issue.

== Writing, film, and TV ==
Milan has written for Ebony, BET, PolicyMic, and The New York Times. He is a contributing author to the anthology Trans Bodies, Trans Selves and the former editor-in-chief of IKONS Magazine, an LGBT pop culture magazine.

Milan documented his transition in the GLAAD-Award nominated documentary, U People and Realness. He has appeared in videos on Upworthy, and for LGBTQ Funders Men and Boys of Color Initiative. He was featured on MTV's reality series I'm From Rolling Stone, where he competed for a Contributing Editor position at Rolling Stone.

== Projects and campaigns ==
Milan was featured in the national media campaign, Live Out Loud's Homecoming Project. The campaign sent successful LGBT people back to their hometown high schools to share knowledge, experience and lessons learned. He is a GLAAD Spirit Day Ambassador, encouraging millions of people to "go purple" as a sign of support for LGBT youth and to speak out against bullying. He and his wife were invited to MTV's the talk, part of the larger "Look Different" campaign.

Tiq, Wade A. Davis, and Darnell L. Moore co-organized the This Is Luv campaign to elevate Black LGBTQ Affirming Love and combat stereotypes of Black communities being more homophobic than other communities.

== LGBT youth work ==
He has been involved with LGBT youth work in New York City for the past decade. At Hetrick-Martin Institute, he ran the CDC program, Comprehensive Risk Counseling and Service, an HIV prevention intervention to create healthy relationships around sex and sexuality for homeless, marginally housed and out-of-home gay and transgender youth. He built workshops around self-esteem, intersectionality, and sex positivity to assist youth in developing and growing self-awareness. He has advocated and trained about LGBT issues at high schools across New York City, and a returning guest lecturer at Lehman College's MSW program to discuss gender and sexuality with graduating social workers.

== Awards and recognition ==
- Black LGBT leader and trailblazer on Ebony.com and BET.com
- His work to improve the lives of trans people was recognized by the Trans 100 List.
- Audre Lorde Founders Award from The Hispanic Black Gay Coalition, Boston, Massachusetts.
- Monica Roberts Black Trans Advocacy Award, presented at Black Trans Advocacy Conference
- DBQ Magazine, Loud 100 List, Nov./Dec, 2012.

== Professional affiliations and community service ==
Milan is the co-chair for the LGBT Taskforce of the National Association of Black Journalists, Advisory Committee member of advocacy organization, Gender Proud, Programming Subcommittee at Hetrick-Martin Institute, and advisory board member for upcoming documentaries, Deep Run and What I'm Made Of.
