= Claude Grunitzky =

Togolese businessman and journalist

- Born: February 28, 1971 (age 55); Lomé, Togo
- Education: University of London; Institut d’Études Politiques de Paris (Sciences Po); Massachusetts Institute of Technology (MIT Sloan)
- Occupations: Journalist, editor, entrepreneur
- Years active: 1995–present
- Organization(s): TRUE Africa; TRUE Agency; The Equity Alliance
- Known for: Founder and editor-in-chief of TRACE magazine Co-founder of TRACE TV; Founder of TRUE Africa
- Notable work: Transculturalism: How the World Is Coming Together
- Television: TRACE TV
- Relatives: Nicolas Grunitzky (great-uncle)

Claude Grunitzky (born February 28, 1971) is a journalist, editor and entrepreneur. A graduate of the University of London and the Massachusetts Institute of Technology, he is best known as founder and editor-in-chief of the lifestyle publication TRACE, an international fashion and music title, and as a co-founder of the TRACE TV network. He runs TRUE Africa, a media platform championing young African voices; TRUE, a content marketing agency; and The Equity Alliance, an investment fund focused on diverse venture capital fund managers and entrepreneurs. He also presents the podcast series Limitless Africa. In 2012, Grunitzky's career was the subject of a Harvard Business School case study, which is taught in the "Power & Influence" MBA class.

== Biography ==
Grunitzky was born in and grew up in the Togolese capital of Lomé. His greatuncle was Nicolas Grunitzky, former president of Togo. His paternal great-grandfather was Polish hence his surname. When Grunitzky was eight years old, his family left Togo for the United States, where his father had been appointed ambassador to Washington. Four years later, Grunitzky moved to France to study at the Catholic boarding school College de Juilly and, later, at the Institut d’Études Politiques de Paris Sciences-Po.

At the age of 20, Grunitzky moved to London after a year at Sciences Po, to pursue studies in economics at London University. It was there that he embarked on his career in journalism, meeting Jefferson Hack and writing for Dazed & Confused, The Big Issue and The Guardian. In 1995, at the age of 24, he launched TRUE magazine, which met with immediate critical success and was renamed TRACE a year later. In 1998, he uprooted to New York and oversaw the magazine as it carved a niche for itself in the world of independent publishing, with its own distinctive brand of transcultural reportage. As the magazine grew in influence, he co-founded TRUE Agency, a specialized advertising agency based in New York and Los Angeles. In February 2003, Grunitzky and business partners Richard Wayner and Olivier Laouchez completed a multimillion-dollar financing deal led by Goldman Sachs Group. As a result, the TRACE brand is now being leveraged globally across various television, mobile, event and interactive platforms.

Grunitzky, a frequent contributor to the French weekly “Courrier International,” has worked as an associate producer on the BBC’s “The Works” series. He currently advises global corporations and governments in the fields of digital innovation and content strategy. In 2008, Grunitzky co-curated, with the cultural services of the French Embassy in the United States, the “I Kiffe NY” festival, devoted to bringing the best of French urban culture to New York City. Grunitzky is also a board member of Humanity in Action, a non-profit organization which works to build global leadership, defend democracy, protect minorities and improve human rights in Denmark, France, Germany, the Netherlands, Poland, and the United States. In December 2013, Grunitzky became a director at the World Policy Institute, a non-partisan source of informed policy leadership. In January 2015, Grunitzky was elected to the board of trustees of avant-garde theater director Robert Wilson's Watermill Center. In July 2017, he was appointed president of the organization. In September 2016, Grunitzky was appointed Visiting Social Innovator at Harvard Kennedy School's Social Innovation + Change Initiative. In February 2017, Grunitzky was elected to the board of trustees of Massachusetts Museum of Contemporary Art (MASS MoCA), one of the world's liveliest centers for making and enjoying today's most evocative art. In February 2023, Grunitzky was elected to the board of trustees of MoMA PS1, a contemporary museum in New York City that presents some of today's most experimental, thought-provoking art.

As a Sloan Fellow at the MIT Sloan School of Management in Cambridge, Massachusetts, Grunitzky earned an MBA. In November 2011, he was appointed a lecturer on "Thought Leadership" during MIT's Sloan Innovation Period. In September 2015, he officially announced the launch of his new venture, TRUE Africa TRUE Africa | The Future Now. Non-Stop.. In March 2021, Grunitzky launched TRUE Africa University with the support of the MIT Center for International Studies . TRUE Africa University aims to become a Pan-African learning community committed to accelerating Africa's sustainable development by mobilizing a global network of academic, industrial and institutional partners.

From 2017 to 2019, Grunitzky was the President of the Byrd Hoffman Water Mill Foundation, which operates The Watermill Center, an international center for the arts and humanities founded by Robert Wilson in 1991 on Long Island, New York. In 2019, Grunitzky was an Executive Producer, alongside Fernando Meirelles and the United Nations, of the feature-length documentary The Great Green Wall, about the African-led initiative to grow an 8,000 km natural wonder of the world across the entire width of Africa. In 2023, Grunitzky was an Executive Producer of another environmental documentary, Blue Carbon bringing together music and science to uncover new ways of listening to nature.

In 2021, seeking a solution to help address some of the systemic inequalities and injustices laid bare by the pandemic and racial justice movement in America, Grunitzky partnered with Richard Parsons (businessman) and some of New York's most successful entrepreneurs and investors to launch The Equity Alliance , an investment fund that seeks to democratize access to capital and expand opportunities for women and people of color.

== Ventures ==
TRACE Magazine

Born out of the short-lived TRUE magazine, TRACE was started by Grunitzky in London in 1996. Beginning life as predominantly an urban culture magazine, TRACE’s identity was quickly influenced by Grunitzky’s nascent interest in what he termed ‘transculturalism’ – a phenomenon referring to those individuals who, in their lifestyles, transcend all traditional sociological notions of race, class or gender. Although the magazine's front pages continued to feature stellar figures from the hip hop and R&B scenes, including Alicia Keys, Mary J. Blige and Rihanna, the establishment of ‘country themed’ issues, beginning with ‘Brasil 2000’, marked a clear step in the direction of an explicitly international approach to popular culture.

TRUE Agency
In 2002, Grunitzky co-founded the TRUE, Agency, a marketing agency based in Los Angeles, in partnership with business partner Richard Wayner and the TBWA\Worldwide group. The agency currently operates out of London, Paris and New York.

TRACE Television
In 2003, Grunitzky also launched TRACE TV, the world's first global urban music channel, with Richard Wayner and Olivier Laouchez, in partnership with Goldman Sachs and Groupe Lagardère. TRACE TV, which is now broadcast in over 150 countries, was successfully sold to European investors in July 2010, ending Grunitzky's involvement with the company.

TRUE Africa
Launched in September 2015, TRUE Africa is a media-tech platform focused on the next thinking on culture, music, sports, lifestyle, politics, fashion and tech in Africa and the diaspora. Grunitzky has stated that TRUE Africa's editors want to discover and champion young African voices all over the world. In 2017, TRUE Africa secured funding from Google's Digital News Initiative, which supports innovation in journalism.

Limitless Africa

Limitless Africa is a new podcast series which asks the questions that matter to Africa. Presented by Claude Grunitzky, it will be broadcast on radio stations around the African continent. Each episode is translated into English, French, Portuguese and some in Kinyarwanda. Find Limitless Africa on your favourite podcast platform.

The Equity Alliance
Launched in January 2021, The Equity Alliance is an investment fund dedicated to providing capital and education to venture capital firms and new enterprises founded or managed by women and people of color. For this venture, Grunitzky partnered with founders Richard Parsons (businessman), Ronald Lauder, Kenneth Lerer, Ben Lerer, Eric Hippeau, Eric Zinterhofer, Scott Kapnick, and Michael Novogratz.

== Publications ==
- With Liz Farrelly : Jam : Music + Style, London, Booth-Clibborn, 1996
- Transculturalism : How The World Is Coming Together, New York, powerHouse, 2004
- With Steven Psyllos : 10 Years of TRACE, New York, London, Booth-Clibborn/Abrams, 2007
- Transculturalismes : Essais, récits et entretiens, Paris, Grasset, 2008
