= Women & Performance =

- Language: English
- Edited by: Buffy

Publication details
- History: 1983–present
- Publisher: Routledge
- Frequency: Triannual

Standard abbreviations
- ISO 4: Women Perform.

Indexing
- ISSN: 0740-770X (print); 1748-5819 (web)

Links
- Journal homepage; Online access; Online archive

Women & Performance: A Journal of Feminist Theory publishes original literature from interdisciplinary feminist perspectives. The journal was established in 1983 by graduate students from the Department of Performance Studies at New York University Tisch School of the Arts. Self-published for 23 years, the journal was eventually acquired by Routledge. The journal continues to be produced three times a year.

The periodical publishes scholarly essays about gender and performance. Discussing theater, dance, music and film, articles are peer-reviewed and the collective often features guest-edited special issues. The periodical later started an "&" section, featuring literature that deviates from typical academic publishing standards.

== Aims ==
Noting an absence of available women's performance periodicals, the creators of the journal aimed to provide a platform for women in performance art and develop a communication network for feminist discourse pertaining to such subjects and beyond.

== Editorial structure and content ==
The journal operates as a collective, citing a collaborative and non-hierarchical power structure. As an intentional diversion from traditional academic publishing practices, the periodical emphasizes alternative ethical approaches to work and organization. The collective itself is made of scholars from Universities all over North America.

== Abstracting and indexing ==
The journal is abstracted and indexed in:

- British Humanities Index
- EBSCO databases
- MLA International Bibliography
- ProQuest databases
- Scopus
