= Masculine of center =

Gender expression and identity terminology

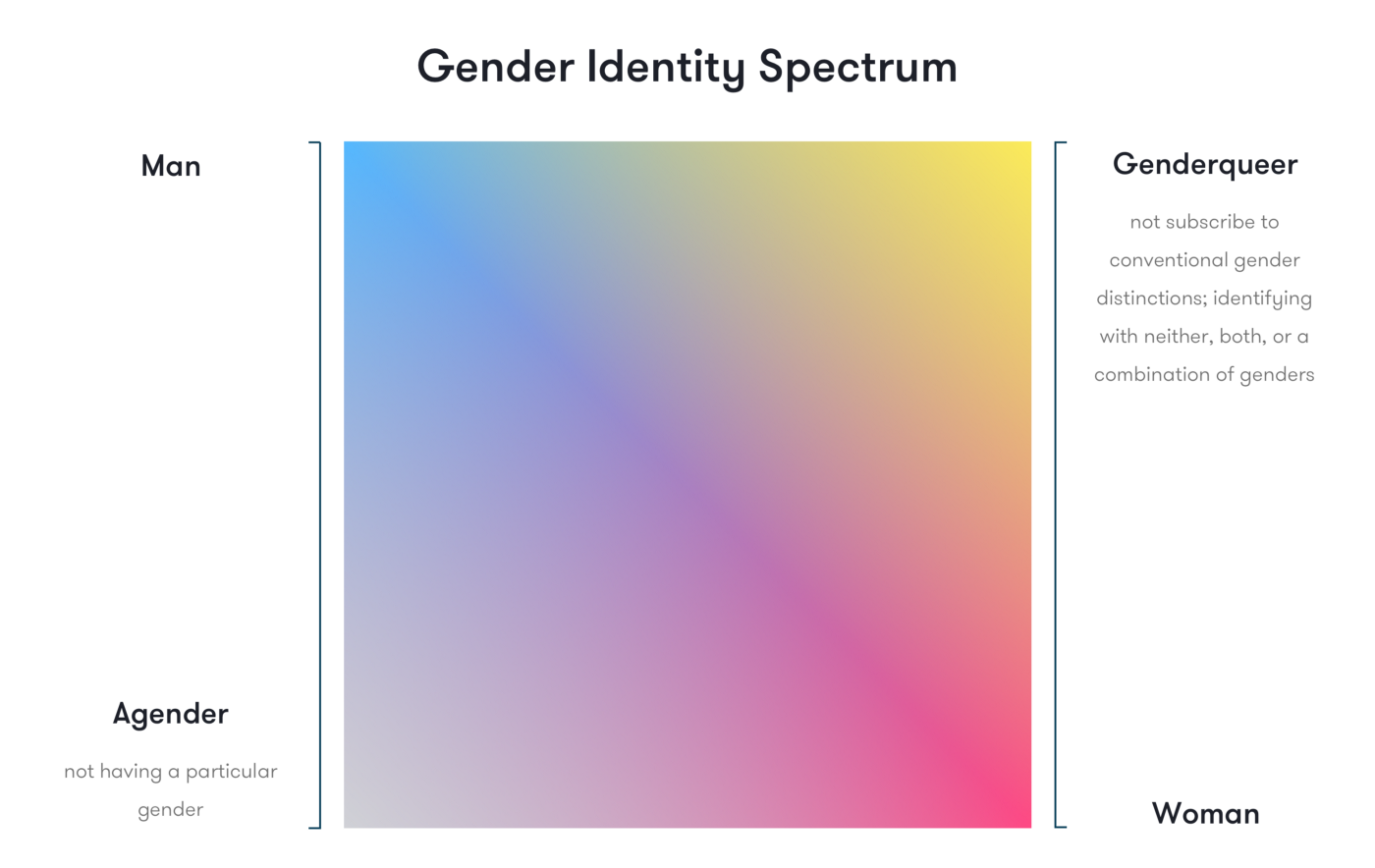
The term masculine of center refers one's position on a gender spectrum. MoC people would roughly fall into the upper left quadrant in this graph.

Masculine of center (abbreviated as MoC) is a broad gender expression term used to describe a person who identifies or presents as being more masculine than feminine. It is most frequently used by lesbian, queer or non-binary individuals – generally (but not exclusively) those assigned female at birth. The term was coined by B. Cole as an umbrella term to encompass several labels used by lesbian, gay, bisexual, and transgender (LGBT) people of color while describing their more-masculine gender identity. Masculine of center is most often used in communities of color, and has implicit sociocultural connotations to both gender equality and racial justice.

== Origin ==
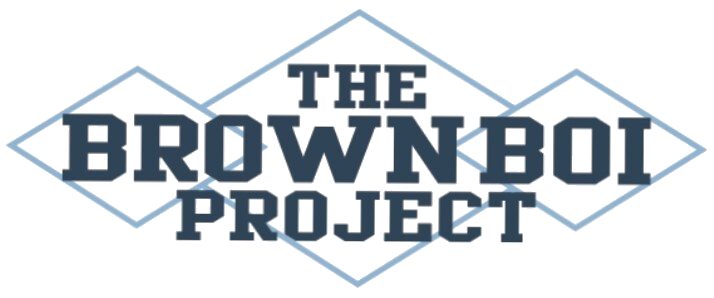
B. Cole, while founding the Brown Boi Project, coined the term masculine of center.

The coinage of the term masculine of center is attributed to B. Cole, a race and gender equality activist from Oakland, California, and the founder of the Brown Boi Project. Cole had identified several similar terms which masculine-leaning queer people of color were using to express their gender experience (e.g. "butch", "dom", "stud", "two-spirit", "macha", etc.) Each of these terms had a specific cultural or ethnic connotation (i.e. "stud" referring specifically to a Black or Latinx butch lesbian), and there lacked a term which encompassed all similar masculine labels used by communities of color. In 2010, Cole conceived the term masculine of center to "include all gender-nonconforming masculine people of color." The emergence of this umbrella phrase had coincided with the inception of the Brown Boi Project, an activism nonprofit which works in communities to improve the lives of LGBTQ people of color, and reshape social perceptions of race and gender. The project's membership (volunteers and staff) has predominantly consisted of masculine of center people, and the term has been innately associated with Brown Boi.

== Definitions and usage ==
Although the original definition had had only included persons of color, "masculine of center" has evolved in becoming more inclusive, while retaining a more implicit socioethnic connotation. This evolving definition has been recognized by B. Cole, and the Brown Boi Project. As a result, sources vary in their inclusiveness or exclusiveness with some more restrictive in only including women or femme bodies, and others more inclusive anyone who identifies as masculine, including cisgender men. BUTCHVoices, a grassroots activism organization dedicated to masculine of center people, defines MoC as "a term ... that recognizes the breadth and depth of identity for lesbian/queer/ womyn who tilt toward the masculine side of the gender scale and includes a wide range of identities such as butch, stud, aggressive/AG, dom, macha, tomboi, trans-masculine etc." The umbrella of MoC purposefully encompasses several identities, and traverses all biological sexes and sexual orientations.

Although most definitions no longer include racial or ethnic criteria, the term is most frequently used in communities of color, specifically by queer women. Because of the history surrounding the origin of the term, it is still regarded as a racialized, albeit implied and contextual. In contrast, the terms Machismo, or simply "masculine", are, in general, contextually neutral labels with respect to race, class or ethnicity. The use of masculine of center insinuates a conscientiousness of the role of race and class with respect to the role of gender in society.
