= Greenland (disambiguation) =

Greenland is the world's largest island and an autonomous territory within the Kingdom of Denmark.

Greenland or Greenlands may also refer to:

== People ==
- Greenland (surname)

== Places ==
=== Australia ===
- Greenlands, New South Wales (Singleton Council), see Singleton Council
- Greenlands, New South Wales (Snowy Monaro Regional Council), see Snowy Monaro Regional Council#Towns and localities
- Greenlands, Queensland

=== Barbados ===
- Greenland, Barbados, a village in the parish of Saint Andrew

=== Canada ===
- Greenland, Nova Scotia, a community in Annapolis County

=== United Kingdom ===
- Greenland, County Antrim, a townland in the civil parish of Larne, County Antrim, Northern Ireland
- Greenland Dock, in London
- Greenlands, Buckinghamshire, a country house in Buckinghamshire
- Greenlands, Worcestershire

=== United States ===
- Greenland, Arkansas, in Washington County
- Greenland, Colorado, in Douglas County
- Greenland, Michigan, in Ontonagon County
- Greenland, New Hampshire, in Rockingham County
- Greenland, Ohio, an unincorporated community
- Greenland, West Virginia, in Grant County
- Greenland Hills, Dallas, Texas, in Dallas County

== Arts, entertainment, and media ==
=== Film ===
- Greenland (film), a 2020 American film
- Greenland 2: Migration, a 2026 American film

=== Music ===
- Greenland (album), 2006 album by Cracker
- "Greenland", a song by The Wedding Present from Going, Going...
- "Greenland", a song by Herbert Grönemeyer from Chaos
- "Greenland", a song by Caravels from Floorboards

=== Literature ===
- Greenland (1988 play), by English playwright Howard Brenton
- Greenland (2009 play), by Canadian playwright Nicolas Billon
- Greenland (2011 play), by English playwrights Moira Buffini, Penelope Skinner, Matt Charman and Jack Thorne

== Fauna ==
- Greenland cod, Gadus ogac
- Greenland Dog, husky breed
- Greenland halibut, Reinhardtius hippoglossoides
- Greenland shark, Somniosus microcephalus

== Other uses ==
- GREENLAND, the callsign of the airline, Air Greenland
- Greenland (European Parliament constituency), a European Parliament constituency from 1979 to 1984
- SS Greenland, a number of ships with this name
- Greenland Holdings, Chinese real-estate corporation
- Greenland national football team, the national team of Greenland (not a member of FIFA)
- Groenlandia (production company), Italian production company

== See also ==
- "Greeneland", a literary setting typical of the novels of Graham Greene: a poor, hot, and dusty tropical backwater.
- Greenland Township (disambiguation)
- Gronland (disambiguation)
