= CinderElmo =

1999 American television special

- DVD cover
- Written by: Tony Geiss
- Directed by: Bruce Leddy
- Starring: Kathy Najimy; Oliver Platt; French Stewart; Keri Russell; Kevin Clash
- Music by: Michael Tavera
- Country of origin: United States
- Original language: English

Production
- Producer: Jill Danton
- Editor: Norman Hollyn
- Running time: 65 minutes
- Production company: Children's Television Workshop

Original release
- Network: Fox
- Release: December 6, 1999

CinderElmo is a 65-minute television film that aired on Fox in the United States on December 6, 1999, loosely based on the fairy tale Cinderella. It was released on VHS and DVD in North America on February 29, 2000.

The special was sponsored by Kmart department stores during the holiday season.

This was the last major primetime special for Sesame Street until Elmo's Christmas Countdown in 2007.

== Plot ==
In the Kingdom of Sesame, there is a little red monster named CinderElmo who lives with his wicked Stepmother, his Stepbrothers Telly Monster and Baby Bear, Zoe and the household dog and mice. His stepfamily has received invitations to the Princess' Ball, which leaves CinderElmo to do all the house chores.

Meanwhile, the King's town crier, Grover, reminds King Fred that Princess Charming has until midnight to find someone to marry or lose the kingdom altogether. The King decides to invite every man and monster in the kingdom. Shortly the word is sent out around the kingdom.

The Stepmother teaches her sons a new dance in preparation for the ball. Baker Cookie Monster arrives as a General Invitation Deliverer and gives CinderElmo an invitation to the ball, but the Stepmother won't permit him. When the horse and carriage arrive, she locks CinderElmo and his friends up in the house. When CinderElmo wishes upon a falling star, his Fairy Godperson comes and encourages CinderElmo to come up with some plan and "do something" to make his dreams come true. After CinderElmo has a bath, Fairy Godperson provides him and Zoe with smart clothes, turns the dog into a handsome prince, turns the dog bowl into a carriage, and the mice into horses. CinderElmo has limited time until midnight to make the best of what Fairy Godperson granted him.

CinderElmo, Zoe and Prince make it to the ball. The Stepbrothers perform the dance their mother taught them and the Princess Charming joins them. Everyone else joins in the dance except CinderElmo who gets caught in the Herald's cloak. Princess Charming finds Prince and asks him to find CinderElmo, the only one who took her fancy. While Princess Charming turns down the marriage proposals of the Stepbrothers, CinderElmo and Zoe sneak past the Stepmother in a suit of armor to attend the last dance before midnight. The suit of armor tumbles and crashes, but Princess Charming gives CinderElmo the dance of his dreams. Before he can introduce himself, CinderElmo has seconds before the midnight deadline and runs off with his friends back home as the magic wears off, changing Elmo, Zoe and Prince back to normal and leaving only a shoe behind, but Princess Charming manages to make her choice of man to marry. Now all the royal family has to do is find the one whose foot fits the shoe in order to find the princess's beloved.

After many unsuccessful tries, the royal family head to the Stepmother's house. The shoe will not fit either of the Stepbrothers. Princess Charming recognizes CinderElmo when he comes, but CinderElmo thinks he is too young to marry. Now the King has the option to change the law that legalizes marriage between the princess and CinderElmo. The Fairy Godperson changes Prince back to a human. Prince and the Princess take a liking to each other. The royal family invites everyone to come to the palace leaving the Stepmother and mice behind.

== Cast ==
- Kathy Najimy as Elmo's Stepmother
- Oliver Platt as the Fairy Godperson
- Keri Russell as Princess Charming
- French Stewart as Prince the Dog (human form)

=== Muppet performers ===
- Kevin Clash as Elmo
- Frank Oz as Grover, Cookie Monster, Bert
- Jerry Nelson as Mr. Johnson, Count
- Carmen Osbahr as Rosita
- David Rudman as Baby Bear
- Fran Brill as Zoe, Prairie Dawn
- Stephanie D'Abruzzo as Queen, Mouse
- Joey Mazzarino as King Fred, Mouse
- Martin Robinson as Telly, Mr. Snuffleupagus
- Caroll Spinney as Big Bird
- Steve Whitmire as Ernie, Kermit the Frog, Prince the Dog

Additional Muppets performed by Pam Arciero, Eric Jacobson, John Kennedy, Michael Lisa, Rick Lyon, Jim Martin, James Andrew Stone, John Tartaglia and Matt Vogel.

== Critical reception ==
Ron Wertheimer, writing in The New York Times, concluded that "CinderElmo has one quality that's glaringly unexpected in production with the Children's Television Workshop imprimatur. It's condescending." Additionally, "The colorful show does display a few flashes of wit. But you'll find the magic sold out."

In the New York Daily News, David Bianculli called it "an enjoyable treat for the whole family, at a time when such offerings are becoming increasingly rare in prime time".
