= The Noose Tightens =

- Big Love episode
- Episode no.: Season 5 Episode 8
- Directed by: David Knoller
- Written by: Seth Greenland
- Cinematography by: Anette Haellmigk
- Editing by: Chris Figler
- Original release date: March 6, 2011
- Running time: 57 minutes

Guest appearances
- Joel McKinnon Miller as Don Embry; Gregory Itzin as Senator Barn; Kevin Rankin as Verlan Walker; Christian Campbell as Greg Ivey; Christopher Hanke as Stuart; Carlos Jacott as Carl Martin; Fredric Lehne as Dennis Innes; Tina Majorino as Heather Tuttle; Lawrence O'Donnell as Lee Hatcher; Wendy Phillips as Peg Embry; Grant Show as Michael Sainte

Episode chronology
← Previous "Til Death Do Us Part"	Next → "Exorcism"

"The Noose Tightens" is the eighth episode of the fifth season of the American drama television series Big Love. It is the 51st overall episode of the series and was written by producer Seth Greenland, and directed by executive producer David Knoller. It originally aired on HBO on March 6, 2011.

The series is set in Salt Lake City and follows Bill Henrickson, a fundamentalist Mormon. He practices polygamy, having Barbara, Nicki and Margie as his wives. The series charts the family's life in and out of the public sphere in their suburb, as well as their associations with a fundamentalist compound in the area. In the episode, Bill and his family face a criminal investigation, while Alby assigns Verlan to kill Bill.

According to Nielsen Media Research, the episode was seen by an estimated 1.36 million household viewers and gained a 0.6/2 ratings share among adults aged 18–49. The episode received critical acclaim, who deemed it as one of the best episodes of the series.

== Plot ==
Bill (Bill Paxton) and Barbara (Jeanne Tripplehorn) talk with Hatcher (Lawrence O'Donnell) over the police investigation, and Hatcher suggests Bill is not the only one targeted; Barbara is a prime suspect as his accomplice.

After seeing her with Greg (Christian Campbell) at the wedding reception, Margie (Ginnifer Goodwin) starts to suspect that Cara Lynn (Cassi Thomson) is on a secret relationship. She starts spending more time at their study sessions, as well as following their moves. During one of their encounters, Margie manages to catch them preparing for sex, and angrily takes her home, but does not reveal it to Nicki (Chloë Sevigny). When Don (Joel McKinnon Miller) reveals that Alby (Matt Ross) is offering to buy his share at Home Plus, Bill once again visits the UEB board, revealing that he contacted a sexual abuse victim of his to retrieve a check that Roman gave him to buy his silence. He threatens Alby into staying out of his business or he will report him to authorities. Angered, Alby hires Verlan (Kevin Rankin) to kill Bill.

After talking with Ben (Douglas Smith), Heather (Tina Majorino) reveals to Barbara that she was responsible for the police investigation, as she opened up about Margie's real age during a session with the bishop. Bill discovers that Barn (Gregory Itzin) has also been questioned by authorities, as they believe Safety Net is responsible, prompting Bill to offer his resignation if the church stops intervening. Pressured by Margie, Cara Lynn finally reveals her relationship to Nicki. Angry, she threatens Greg and questions what her daughter has become. Later, Nicki visits Alby, who is angry that he has been taking many women away from the compound, but Nicki has just discovered that he ordered Bill's death. When Nicki claims that Dale killed himself because of Alby, Alby attacks her and takes her hostage.

Sainte (Grant Show) visits Margie, and suggests that her family is not supporting her business venture. When she consults it with Bill and Barbara, she calls Sainte to inform she is pulling out of Goji. Bill, meanwhile, realizes that the charges against him are increasing and he can face up to 20 years in prison. Alby informs Verlan that he will not be paid for his services, threatening him to comply anyway as he carries a tape about his involvement in Don's attack. He forces him to dig a grave for Nicki, but surprises them by killing Verlan instead and sends Nicki away to send a message to Bill.

== Production ==
=== Development ===
The episode was written by producer Seth Greenland, and directed by executive producer David Knoller. This was Greenland's second writing credit, and Knoller's fourth directing credit.

== Reception ==
=== Viewers ===
In its original American broadcast, "The Noose Tightens" was seen by an estimated 1.36 million household viewers with a 0.6/2 in the 18–49 demographics. This means that 0.6 percent of all households with televisions watched the episode, while 2 percent of all of those watching television at the time of the broadcast watched it. This was a 29% increase in viewership from the previous episode, which was seen by an estimated 1.05 million household viewers with a 0.5/1 in the 18–49 demographics.

=== Critical reviews ===
"The Noose Tightens" received critical acclaim. Emily St. James of The A.V. Club gave the episode an "A" grade and wrote, "After a season where even the best episodes can be charitably described as “hit and miss,” “The Noose Tightens” is one of the four or five best episodes of Big Love ever produced. If the final two episodes are as good as this one, the series is going to head out making a strong claim to its final season having problems, yes, but nicely saving the show and maybe even its ultimate legacy."

Alan Sepinwall of HitFix wrote, "I got caught up in time for “The Noose Tightens.” And I'm damn glad to have done so. Because that? That was insane – and the good kind of insane, as opposed to the Big Love season 4 brand of insane." James Poniewozik of TIME wrote, "Pointedly, this season has established that Bill and the Henrickson women are armed. And it would seem that Big Love is readying its guns, literal and metaphorical, to go off in the final act." Megan Angelo of The Wall Street Journal wrote, "at the last minute, he had a change of heart. Albie scared Nicki - and murdered Verlan. Coldbloodedness is really going around."

Aileen Gallagher of Vulture wrote, "Bill Henrickson began as Big Love's anchor, but writers long ago ceded the show to his wives. Last night it was Nicki's turn to be complicated, and she exchanged the self-righteous prig act for one of a woman ashamed and traumatized." Allyssa Lee of Los Angeles Times wrote, "“The Noose Tightens” on the Henrickson family in this excellent episode. The third-to-last hour not only drew out the escalating stakes of each family member (the intensity has been ratcheted up to 11), it kept me on edge and wondering what will happen next as the show makes its inevitable course toward the season's (and series') end."

TV Fanatic gave the episode a perfect 5 star rating out of 5 and wrote, "The writers of Big Love were able to cram over five different storylines into "The Noose Tightens" without it feeling too overwhelming. In fact, by the end of the episode, all I wanted was for it to be next Sunday so I could see what will happen next." Mark Blankenship of HuffPost wrote, "I predicted last week that a gun was about to go off, but I didn't think it would be that gun. Just one more surprise in the cake-tossing mania of "The Noose Tightens.""
