= Greenlandic =

Greenlandic may refer to:

- Something of, from, or related to Greenland, a country
- Greenlanders
- Greenlandic Inuit, the indigenous people of Greenland
- Greenlandic culture
- Greenlandic cuisine
- Greenlandic people in Denmark
- Greenlandic language, an Inuit–Yupik–Unangan language spoken by the people of Greenland
  - Kalaallisut (West Greenlandic)
  - Inuktun (North Greenlandic)
  - Tunumiisut (East Greenlandic)
- Historically, anything relating to the Norse communities in southwestern Greenland
- Greenlandic Norse, extinct language
- Danish language, as spoken in Greenland

== Other uses ==
- Greenlandic sheep, a sheep species
- Greenlandic krone, a planned currency for Greenland, plans of which were abandoned in 2009
- Greenlandic shark, a national dish of Iceland consisting of a Greenland shark

== See also ==
- Greenland (disambiguation)
- Greenlandian, a geological stage
