= Greenland Township =

Greenland Township may refer to one of the following townships in the United States:

- Greenland Township, Washington County, Arkansas
- Greenland Township, Michigan
- Greenland Township, Barnes County, North Dakota

== See also ==
- Greenland (disambiguation)
