= Greenland (surname) =

Greenland is a surname. Notable people with the surname include:

- Colin Greenland (born 1954), English writer
- Emma Jane Greenland (1760-1843), English painter, writer, singer
- Sander Greenland (born 1951), American statistician and epidemiologist
- Seth Greenland (born 1955), American writer
- Susan Kaiser Greenland (born 1956), American writer
