= SS Heminge =

A number of steamships have been renamed Heminge, including –

- SS Heminge (1918), a British cargo ship in service 1946–48
- SS Heminge (1919), a British cargo ship in service 1919–40
- SS Heminge (1945), a British cargo ship in service 1955–56
