= William Hall Jr. =

American actor (1946–2025)

- Born: October 3, 1946; Rendville, Ohio, U.S.
- Died: February 14, 2025 (aged 78)
- Occupation: Actor
- Years active: 1989–2020

William Hall Jr. (October 3, 1946 – February 14, 2025) was an American actor who started his career in the early 1970s.

Hall Jr. died on February 14, 2025, at the age of 78.

== Appearances ==
- Agricultural Promotional
- KIRO Promotional
- All My Children
- (1985) Trouble in Mind
- (1985) The Rape of Richard Beck
- (1989) Driving Miss Daisy
- (1996) Darkdrive
- (2002) Farewell to Harry
- (2012) Safety Not Guaranteed

== Theater ==
- The Island
- Sunset & Glories
- To Be Young, Gifted & Black
- (1973) Steambath
- (1974) Huckleberry Finn
- (1980) Lesson from Aloes
- (1980) Another Part of the Forest
- (1988) Driving Miss Daisy
- (1993) Unquestioned Integrity
- (1996) I'm Not Rappaport
