= Alexondra Lee =

American actress, dancer and producer

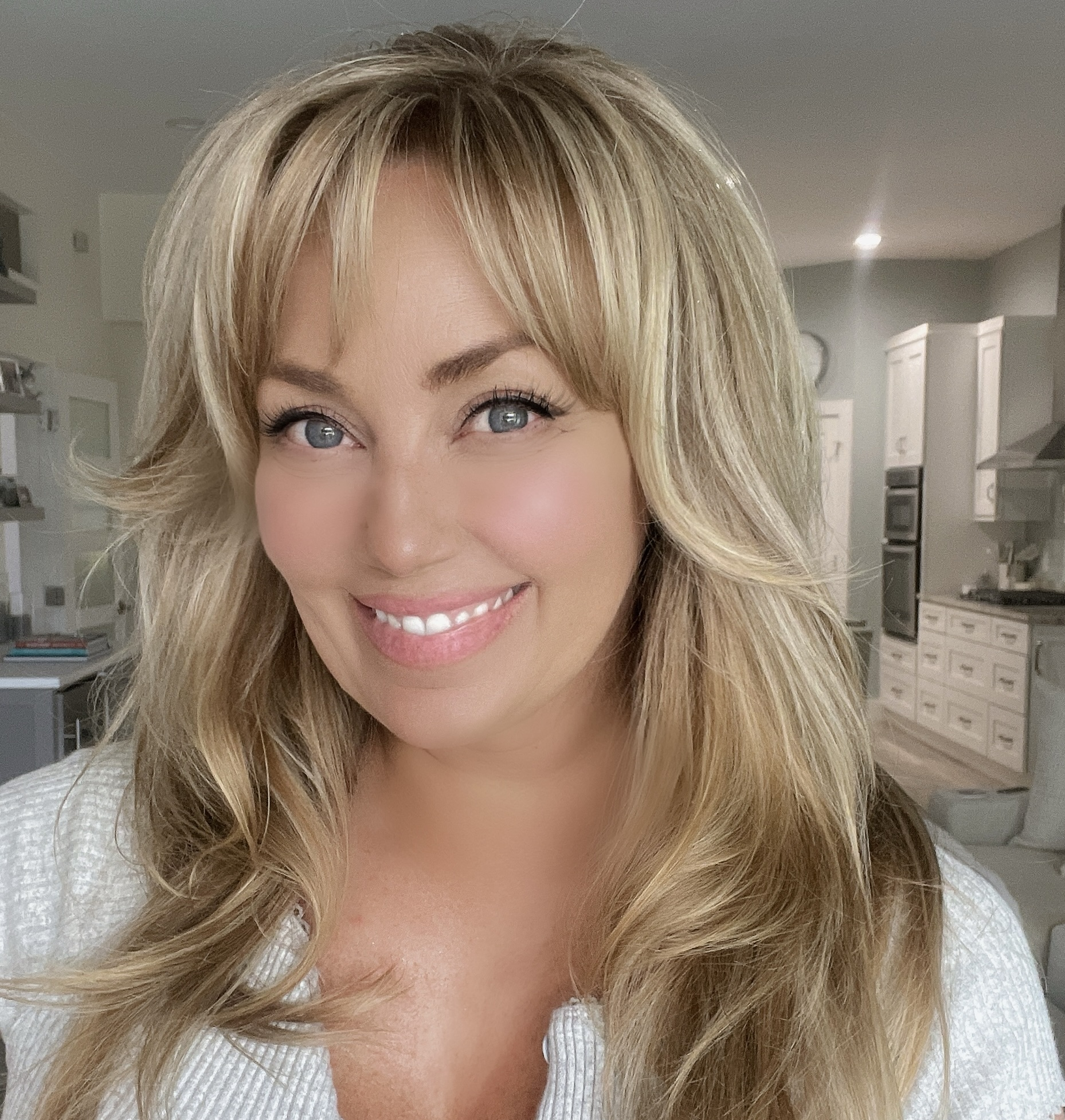
- Born: Pennsylvania, U.S.
- Occupations: Producer, actress, dancer
- Years active: 1989–present
- Spouse: Stephen Dunham (m. 2005; died 2012)

Alexondra Lee is an American actress, dancer and producer. She is a television producer of such shows as Oxygen's The Real Murders of Atlanta (seasons 1-3), Murder and Justice: Martha Moxley, Magnolia's In with the Old, A&E's Marcia Clark Investigates and "60 Days In: Narcoland", Jo Frost: Nanny on Tour and Alien Highway, and History Channel's Legend of The Superstition Mountains.

She was born in Pennsylvania to parents Mae and Harry Lee. Lee studied ballet at age four and began dancing with the New York City Ballet at age seven; she performed with the latter in The Nutcracker Suite.

She starred in the short-lived Special Unit 2 as Detective Kate Benson and had a regular role as Callie on Party of Five.

Lee was ranked No. 81 on Stuff Magazine's 101 "Most Beautiful Women in The World" in 2001. She had a role in Paranormal Activity 4 as Holly Nelson. She was married to actor Stephen Dunham until his death in September 2012. She worked with him in his last film, Paranormal Activity 4.

== Selected filmography ==
Film
Year	Title	Role	Notes
2012	Paranormal Activity 4	Holly	
2005	Shopgirl	Karen	
2000	What Women Want	Woman in Pink Sweater	
1999	My Teacher's Wife	Kirsten Beck	
1998	Folle d'elle	Shirley	
1994	Roadflower	Ashley Lerolland	

Television
Year	Title	Role	Notes
2006	Alpha Mom		TV movie
2006	CSI: Crime Scene Investigation	Rebecca McGill	1 Episode
2003	What I Like About You	Maureen	1 Episode
2003	Momentum	Brooke	TV movie
2002	Robbery Homicide Division	Reyna / Rickie / Rhonda	1 episode
2002	Push, Nevada	Delilah	4 episodes
2001-2002	Special Unit 2	Detective Kate Benson	19 episodes
2001	Kiss My Act	Jenny	TV movie
2001	Boston Public	Tina Knowles	5 episodes
2000	Zoe, Duncan, Jack & Jane	Carol	1 Episode
2000	Secret Agent Man	Nurse 613	1 Episode
2000	Grapevine	Vicki Meyers	1 Episode
1999	Providence	Jamie	1 Episode
1999	Oh, Grow Up	Allison	1 Episode
1999	Working	Nichole	1 Episode
1998	Early Edition	Anne	1 Episode
1997-1998	George and Leo	Margie Polakowski	4 episodes
1998	Jenny		1 Episode
1998	Rag and Bone	Gina Moran	TV movie
1997	Players	Colleen O'Hara	1 Episode
1996-1997	Party of Five	Callie Martel	20 episodes
1994	CBS Schoolbreak Special	Claire	My Summer as a Girl
1993	Picket Fences	Lisa Fenn	3 episodes
1993	FBI: The Untold Stories		1 Episode
1991	Sisters	Teenage Alex	1 Episode
1991	L.A. Law	Laurie Penn	1 Episode
1991	Thirtysomething	Melissa, Age 16	1 Episode
1989	Good Morning, Miss Bliss	Shana	1 Episode
