= SS Greenland =

A number of steamships have been named Greenland, including

- SS Greenland (1872), a Canadian fishing and Sealing ship in service between 1872 and 1907
- SS Greenland (1914), a British cargo ship in service 1921–41
- SS Greenland (1945), a British cargo ship in service 1946–55
