= Special Unit 2 =

- Genre: Science fiction; Comedy drama; Occult detective fiction
- Created by: Evan Katz
- Starring: Michael Landes; Alexondra Lee; Danny Woodburn
- Composer: Mark Morgan
- Country of origin: United States
- Original language: English
- No. of seasons: 2
- No. of episodes: 19 (1 unaired pilot)

Production
- Production locations: Vancouver, British Columbia; Chicago, Illinois
- Running time: 45 minutes
- Production companies: Rego Park Film and Television; Paramount Television

Original release
- Network: UPN
- Release: April 11, 2001 – February 13, 2002

Special Unit 2 is an American science fiction comedy television series that aired on UPN for two seasons from April 11, 2001 through February 13, 2002. The series focused upon the exploits of a top-secret Chicago police division known as Special Unit 2, charged with policing the city's large population of mythological beings, known as "Links". It was filmed in Vancouver, British Columbia. It was cancelled after nineteen episodes due to a change in UPN's management.

== Plot ==
"Links" are the common monsters from folklore and mythology (except vampires, whose existence is specifically identified as preposterous), and are described as being the missing link between apes and humans (although other human-like species have evolved, for instance gargoyles, who are identified as humanoid descendants of dinosaurs). They live in hiding and/or disguise among the human population. On occasions when Links are seen by humans, they are usually dismissed as hallucinations or optical illusions, except by those who are especially perceptive. Special Unit 2 is the top-secret division of the Chicago police specifically designated to handle Link-related cases. Other units of the police department are specifically ordered to stay out of Special Unit 2's way, which provides a great deal of leeway and access for cases.

Detective Nick O'Malley (Michael Landes) and his newly assigned partner, Detective Kate Benson (Alexondra Lee), are the two central characters. Nick is a maverick veteran in Special Unit 2. His initially callous, jaded and at times cruel demeanor is revealed to be a result of guilt over the loss of his previous partner; Julie. A criminal called The Chameleon cut her up into "600 inch-sized cubes". (It would later be revealed that Nick and Julie were having a secret affair.) Kate is one of the rare individuals who acknowledge the existence of Links instead of finding a more acceptable (albeit incorrect) explanation for the traditionally unexplained phenomena that they cause. Her refusal to deny her observations jeopardizes her career as a police officer and estranges her from her fellow officers. Kate's tenacity and conviction leads to her recruitment by Special Unit 2.

Supporting characters include Captain Richard Page (Richard Gant), SU2's commanding officer with a prosthetic metal hand that serves as the focus of running gags. The unit's liaison with the Link community is Carl (Danny Woodburn), a verbally aggressive gnome known for kleptomania and armed robbery, who is mutually antagonistic towards Nick. Nick and Carl's love-hate relationship contributes some of the humor within the fantasy universe of the show. Carl is completely invincible to everything but a diamond-coated saw and dragon fire/teeth.

Other members of the unit are the technical experts, who provide background, research and technology on various Links. Initially the primary technician is the acerbic Link biologist Sean Radmon (Sean Whalen), succeeded in Season 2 by Jonathan (Jonathan Togo), SU2's obsessively enthusiastic technician who analyzes Link evidence and produces a seemingly endless stream of Link-related inventions with positive glee. Another recurring character introduced in Season 2, is Alice Cramer (Pauley Perrette), who is the Unit's public relations person and acts to convince the press and witnesses that the crimes and strange events committed by Links are merely toxic spills, mass hallucinations, drugged out street gangers, etc. Another recurring character is Jerry (Mike Rad), someone who drifts from job to job and occasionally encounters Links. (For example, in the first episode, Carl attempted to stick him up at the store where he was working.)

The unit further maintains secrecy by hiding the physical location of the unit's headquarters behind the facade of a Chinese laundry. The detectives drive unmarked cars and utilize sophisticated weaponry and technology to deal with Link threats.

A partial list of Links encountered by SU2 in the course of the episodes include a trash-talking Gargoyle, the scheming Pied Piper posing as a children's television host, the homicidal Sandman, Jack The Ripper and deadly snake-haired Medusa, all revealed to be criminals in these particular cases. Most of the monsters are portrayed as behaving rather human-like, forming urban communities.

== Cast ==
- Michael Landes as Det. Nick O'Malley
- Alexondra Lee as Kate Benson
- Danny Woodburn as Carl
- Richard Gant as Richard Page
- Johnathan Togo as Johnathan

== Episodes ==
=== Series overview ===
Season	Episodes	Originally released	
Season	Episodes	First released	Last released
1	6	April 11, 2001	May 16, 2001
2	13	October 3, 2001	February 13, 2002

=== Season 1 (2001) ===
No. overall	No. in season	Title	Directed by	Written by	Original release date	Prod. code
0	0	"Unaired Pilot"	TBD	TBD	Unaired	100
1	1	"The Brothers"	John Kretchmer	Evan Katz	April 11, 2001	101
Officer Kate Benson is rescued from a monster by the mysterious Nick O'Malley, who asks her to join his Special Unit 2, a top secret section of the Chicago P.D. tasked to control, detain, or exterminate mythological creatures aka 'Links.'
2	2	"The Pack"	Oscar Costo	James Krieg	April 18, 2001	103
Detective Nicholas O'Malley must infiltrate a pack of high powered power brokers in Chicago, who are suspected of having more than a few 'lycanthropic' tendencies. O'Malley must himself be infected with the werewolf bite to convince the others that he is one of them.
3	3	"The Wraps"	Terry Windell	Joel Surnow	April 25, 2001	102
An ancient JAPANESE mummy arises from the dead, who can not only take the form of any handsome man he imagines in order to kidnap beautiful unsuspecting women, but can also do Matrix Style martial arts fighting as well. The better to beat Detective O'Malley with. The mummy needs three women to complete his sacrificial ceremony and O'Malley must stop him.
4	4	"The Web"	John Kretchmer	Sara Israel	May 2, 2001	104
Something is seducing and killing young men, and the Special Unit 2 Squad suspects a young woman of being a 'spider mutant' link. A young girl is also attacked by the creature and is taken under the wing of O'Malley, who finds he has a growing attraction to the girl. Ultimately they discover that there are more of these beautiful and deadly 'black widows' than they anticipated and they must find the nest before they claim more victims.
5	5	"The Waste"	Oscar Costo	Joel Surnow	May 9, 2001	105
A mysterious creature is created from the medical waste from liposuction clinics. Yes it is a creature composed of ... FAT, roaming the sewer system of Chicago, in search of even more human fat to serve its insatiable appetite and it's not above killing to get a meal. Also O'Malley's former partner, a fellow detective is wrongly charged with the murder of a police officer, who was actually killed by the monster. O'Malley swears he will find a way to clear his friend's name.
6	6	"The Depths"	John Kretchmer	Joel Surnow & James Krieg	May 16, 2001	106
A series of mysterious attacks on young women, leaving them comatose, brings the Special Unit 2 team in search of an aquatic link - a frightening version of the legendary 'Mer-Men".

=== Season 2 (2001–2002) ===
No. overall	No. in season	Title	Directed by	Written by	Original release date	Prod. code
7	1	"The Grain"	David Straiton	Jack Bernstein	October 3, 2001	203
A sleeping Kate is taken over by a Sandman, a 'Link' that enters his victims' dreams and has them act out their wildest subconscious fantasies.
8	2	"The Skin"	Oscar Costo	William Schmidt	October 10, 2001	202
Kate and Nick are forced to release the original Chameleon, previously imprisoned by the SU2 team, so he'll help them catch a new Chameleon now terrorizing Chicago.
9	3	"The Years"	John Kretchmer	Evan Katz	October 17, 2001	201
O'Malley is attracted by an enigmatic fashion designer, their primary suspect, as they track a "Year Witch" that kills its victims by sucking their youth out of them.
10	4	"The Invisible"	John Kretchmer	Scott Nimerfro	October 24, 2001	204
A bogeyman, that can only be seen by kids, gnomes and banshees, kills a babysitter. The team attempt to save an innocent man blamed for his previous crimes before he's executed.
11	5	"The Eve"	Oscar Costo	Josh Lobis & Darin Moiselle	October 31, 2001	205
On All Hallow's Eve, a mysterious evil Link, with the power to raise the dead, resurrects four notorious criminals and takes hostages at a Halloween party, in exchange for a powerful artifact.
12	6	"The Rocks"	James Ward Byrkit	Martin Weiss	November 7, 2001	206
The team investigate a series of murders where the victims, all male, have been turned into stone statues by beautiful snake-haired women, the Gorgons of legend.
13	7	"The Drag"	John Kretchmer	Harry Victor & Dan E. Fesman	November 14, 2001	207
When stories surface of attacks by a winged dragon, the team's investigation of a mystical jewelled necklace theft leads to the grave of a Red Indian princess.
14	8	"The Beast"	Paul Abascal	Paul Bernbaum	November 21, 2001	208
Whilst investigating undercover, Kate is put in mortal peril as she's captured by an ancient 300-year-old ogre that preys on strippers and 'ladies of the night', devouring their flesh.
15	9	"The Wall"	David Straiton	Jack Bernstein	November 28, 2001	209
Kate reluctantly attends her school reunion, and when skeletal-like creatures with sharp claws that live in the walls begin taking lives, the scene is all too familiar.
16	10	"The Straw"	Rod Hardy	Martin Weiss & Scott Nimerfro	January 16, 2002	210
A vicious creature made of straw, a scarecrow, is unearthed from the sewers and stalks the streets, literally scaring its victims to death by their greatest fear.
17	11	"The Love"	Oscar Costo	Paul Bernbaum	January 30, 2002	211
The team get caught up in a feud between an Amorphian (a true Cupid) and a lovelorn Zaybar (an amphibious humanoid), who's mad at him for causing his girlfriend to fall in love with someone else by emitting a gaseous love potion that affects everyone near him.
18	12	"The Piper"	John Kretchmer	Dan E. Fesman & Harry Victor	February 6, 2002	212
Carl goes undercover to investigate a children's TV star suspected of being a Pied Piper, a creature able to use his mind control power to manipulate children to commit crimes on his behalf.
19	13	"The Wish"	Michael Lange	Jeff Braunstein	February 13, 2002	213
The team must stop a djinn (genie-like creature) who is approaching her quota needed to become a free-willed being. When she does, she will be able to cause destruction and chaos wherever and however she wishes.

== Home media ==
On September 14, 2017, it was announced that Visual Entertainment had acquired the rights to the series. They subsequently released Special Unit 2: The Complete Series on DVD in Region 1 on October 6, 2017.
