= My Teacher's Wife =

1995 film by Bruce Leddy

- Directed by: Bruce Leddy
- Written by: Seth Greenland
- Produced by: Robert N. Fried; Stan Wlodkowski; Richard J. Zinman
- Starring: Jason London; Tia Carrere; Christopher McDonald; Alexondra Lee; Zak Orth; Jeffrey Tambor
- Cinematography: Zoltán David
- Edited by: Norman Hollyn
- Music by: Kevin Gilbert
- Production companies: Fried Films; Savoy Pictures; Trimark Pictures
- Distributed by: Savoy Pictures
- Release date: 1995
- Running time: 89 minutes
- Country: United States
- Language: English

My Teacher's Wife is a 1995 teen sex comedy film directed by Bruce Leddy, and written by Seth Greenland. Originally titled "Bad With Numbers," the story follows the travails of Southport High School senior Todd Boomer (Jason London) whose lifelong dream of going to Harvard is derailed by his hard-nosed calculus teacher Mr. Mueller (Christopher McDonald). When Todd enlists the tutoring help of the sexy and mysterious Vicki (Tia Carrere), things go from bad to worse when it is revealed that she is married to his teacher.

The film was shot in Wilmington, NC with a planned theatrical release in February 1995. But the financial collapse of Savoy Pictures left the movie orphaned until Trimark Pictures acquired it, re-titled it as "My Teacher's Wife," and released it on home video. It was also featured on the USA cable channel. The score was composed and performed by Kevin Gilbert, a major contributor to the Tuesday Night Music Club group which wrote songs for Sheryl Crow on her debut album. The film also features animations by Academy Award nominated cartoonist Bill Plympton.

== Cast ==
- Jason London as Todd Boomer
- Tia Carrere as Vicky Mueller
- Christopher McDonald as Roy Mueller
- Alexondra Lee as Kirsten Beck
- Zak Orth as Paul Faber
- Jeffrey Tambor as Jack Boomer

== Critical reception ==
The film holds a score of 48% on Rotten Tomatoes.
