= Til Death Do Us Part (Big Love) =

- Big Love episode
- Episode no.: Season 5 Episode 7
- Directed by: David Petrarca
- Written by: Aaron Allen
- Cinematography by: Rob Sweeney
- Editing by: Byron Smith
- Original release date: February 27, 2011
- Running time: 59 minutes

Guest appearances
- Bruce Dern as Frank Harlow; Daveigh Chase as Rhonda Volmer; Gregory Itzin as Senator Barn; Joel McKinnon Miller as Don Embry; Tina Majorino as Heather Tuttle; Jenni Blong as Evie; Christian Campbell as Greg Ivey; Carlos Jacott as Carl Martin; Fredric Lehne as Dennis Innes; Peter Mackenzie as Bishop; Kevin Rankin as Verlan Walker; Grant Show as Michael Sainte; Audrey Wasilewski as Pam Martin

Episode chronology
← Previous "D.I.V.O.R.C.E."	Next → "The Noose Tightens"

"Til Death Do Us Part" is the seventh episode of the fifth season of the American drama television series Big Love. It is the 50th overall episode of the series and was written by Aaron Allen, and directed by David Petrarca. It originally aired on HBO on February 27, 2011.

The series is set in Salt Lake City and follows Bill Henrickson, a fundamentalist Mormon. He practices polygamy, having Barbara, Nicki and Margie as his wives. The series charts the family's life in and out of the public sphere in their suburb, as well as their associations with a fundamentalist compound in the area. In the episode, Bill and Nicki prepare for their wedding, and Alby makes another move to get revenge on Bill.

According to Nielsen Media Research, the episode was seen by an estimated 1.05 million household viewers and gained a 0.5/1 ratings share among adults aged 18–49. The episode received mostly positive reviews from critics, who praised the ending.

== Plot ==
With her wedding coming up, Nicki (Chloë Sevigny) is eager over her long desired dreamed day. She wants a wedding reception, and Bill (Bill Paxton) supports her decision. Cara Lynn (Cassi Thomson) and Greg (Christian Campbell) continue their affair, and she lies to Nicki by claiming she is still seeing Gary (Luke Klop).

Bill and Don (Joel McKinnon Miller) discover that Alby (Matt Ross) has become their Home Plus landlord, and Bill decides to talk with the UEB to expose him, despite Don suggesting they should stay out. However, the board still stands with Alby, as they believe Bill's actions have caused more harm than good. Ben (Douglas Smith) and Rhonda (Daveigh Chase) have a one-night stand, but Ben tells her that it will not happen again. Margie (Ginnifer Goodwin) continues the rally, now sponsored by Michael Sainte (Grant Show). However, Carl (Carlos Jacott) is angry that Pam (Audrey Wasilewski) is wasting money on the business, but Margie scolds him for not supporting them.

Discovering that Barbara (Jeanne Tripplehorn) is officiating the wedding, Nicki confronts her for intervening in her big day, and Barbara explains she wanted to "give her away" to Bill. Bill talks with Margie over her sponsorship, as Michael's company may be scamming her, but she defends her decision. He also has to deal with Lois (Grace Zabriskie), who left Frank (Bruce Dern) to be on the floor instead of calling an ambulance. Despite having to deal with Alby increasing the rent, Bill arrives on time for the wedding, with Barbara officiating it after solving her conflict with Nicki. As they celebrate at the house, Barbara answers the door, with two police officers looking for her. Barbara accompanies them outside, as they feel she holds crucial information regarding a statutory rape case.

== Production ==
=== Development ===
The episode was written by Aaron Allen, and directed by David Petrarca. This was Allen's first writing credit, and Petrarca's eighth directing credit.

== Reception ==
=== Viewers ===
In its original American broadcast, "Til Death Do Us Part" was seen by an estimated 1.05 million household viewers with a 0.5/1 in the 18–49 demographics. This means that 0.5 percent of all households with televisions watched the episode, while 1 percent of all of those watching television at the time of the broadcast watched it. This was a slight increase in viewership from the previous episode, which was seen by an estimated 1.04 million household viewers with a 0.5/1 in the 18–49 demographics.

=== Critical reviews ===
"Til Death Do Us Part" received mostly positive reviews from critics. Emily St. James of The A.V. Club gave the episode a "B+" grade and wrote, "I'm not terribly excited to find out how some of this plays out, but I've reached a point where I DO want to see what happens to this family again, where I DO want to see if they completely crumble apart or find a way to move forward together. And for all of the circuitous plotting the show has utilized this season, it's impressive that the show has found a way for it all to come down to this."

Megan Angelo of The Wall Street Journal wrote, "Big Love is having a wedding - with all of the drama, and none of the fun."

Aileen Gallagher of Vulture wrote, "Nicki was her usual wretched self for the bulk of the episode, alternately snapping and pouting. She wants a new dress for her wedding, and a reception. Barb makes a show of paying for Nicki's new dress as a gift, and also makes a show of pulling that pesky old gun out of her handbag. Okay, writers. We know what Chekhov said about guns. But do you?" Allyssa Lee of Los Angeles Times wrote, "Barb divorced Bill. Bill married Nicki. “The children discovered something called ‘sexting.’” What's this world coming to? A lot of this episode, called “Til Death Do Us Part,” was about choosing sides, perhaps drawing battle lines as the series creeps to a close."

TV Fanatic gave the episode a 4.5 star rating out of 5 and wrote, "Wow! What a crazy episode. With only so many more installments left before this show comes to a final close, I knew we'd be in for a ride, but I wasn't expecting such a wild one in "Til Death Do Us Part."" Mark Blankenship of HuffPost wrote, "It's an honest-to-god compliment when I say that "Til Death Do Us Part," this week's installment, makes me sick. For fifty-six minutes, the tension builds with elegant precision, like a murderer gliding through fresh snow around a beautiful house, gracefully blocking the doors before he sneaks through a window. And then in the final scene, when chaos breaks in, it tiptoes. Only a few people realize what's happening, and all the rest keep laughing. Watching those few souls poisoned with knowledge is so agonizing it makes my stomach twist around."
