= Farewell to Harry =

- Directed by: Garrett Bennett
- Written by: Garrett Bennett; Neil Weinberger; Steve Edmiston; Ann Wilkinson
- Produced by: William Steding
- Starring: Joe Flanigan; William Hall, Jr. Lysette Anthony
- Distributed by: Questar Inc. PorchLight Entertainment
- Release date: 2002
- Running time: 98 minutes
- Country: United States
- Language: English

Farewell to Harry is a 2002 American drama film about a writer (Joe Flanigan) who forms an unexpected friendship with a local legend (William Hall, Jr.).

== Plot ==
Nick Sennet (Joe Flanigan) is a writer who returns to his Pacific Northwest hometown to write a novel. While in town, he meets Harry (William Hall, Jr.), who, according to legend, is dead. As their friendship grows, Nick learns that Harry owns a run-down hat factory, where he spends his days drinking whiskey. When Nick becomes a projectionist at a local theatre, he decides that he is going to help Harry save himself before it is too late. While this is happening Nick meets Harry's old girlfriend, Louie Sinclair (Lysette Anthony) They decide to try to renovate the factory, and to try to save Harry. When it seems that all will fail, they stumble upon a hidden cellar filled with vintage hats, which allows their dreams to be fulfilled.

== Cast ==
- Joe Flanigan as Nick Sennet
- Brent David Fraser as Mickey
- William Hall, Jr. as Harry
- Lysette Anthony as Louie Sinclair
- Carl Ballantine as Hickey
- John Gilbert as Belov

== Awards ==
Farewell to Harry won the following awards:

- Houston International Film Festival: Silver Remy Award, Best First Feature Film
- Independent Spirit Awards: Semi-Finalist – Someone to Watch
- First Glance Philadelphia Film Festival: Runner-Up, Best Feature
- Seattle International Film Festival: Special Jury Award – Shooting in Seattle – Best Film
- Phoenix International Film Festival: Official Selection
- Spokane International Film Festival: Official Selection
