= Let's Be Real =

American television comedy puppet show

- Genre: Adult puppet show Sketch comedy
- Based on: Les Guignols
- Written by: Robert Smigel; Brian Reich; Andrew Weinberg; Dave Sirus
- Directed by: Bruce Leddy
- Country of origin: United States
- Original language: English
- No. of seasons: 1
- No. of episodes: 4

Production
- Executive producers: Robert Smigel; Anna Wenger; Ben Silverman; Howard T. Owens; Kevin Healy; Greg Lipstone; Gerald-Brice Viret; Arnaud Renard; Matthieu Porte
- Camera setup: Multi-camera
- Production companies: Fox Alternative Entertainment; Propagate Content; Canal+; Poochie Doochie Productions

Original release
- Network: Fox
- Release: April 29 – May 20, 2021

Let's Be Real is an American presidential-themed comedy puppet show that aired on Fox from April 29 to May 20, 2021. This series is based on the French show Les Guignols.

It originally had an election-themed special on October 1, 2020.

== Production ==
On April 1, 2021, it was announced that Fox had ordered the series which premiered on April 29, 2021. Robert Smigel, Anna Wenger, Ben Silverman, Howard T. Owens, Kevin Healy, Greg Lipstone, Gerald-Brice Viret, Arnaud Renard and Matthieu Porte served as executive producers. Robert Smigel, Brian Reich and Andrew Weinberg served as writers.

== Episodes ==
=== Series overview ===
Season	Episodes	Originally released	
Season	Episodes	First released	Last released
Special		October 1, 2020	
1	4	April 29, 2021	May 20, 2021

=== Special (2020) ===
Title	Directed by	Original release date	Prod. code	U.S. viewers (millions)
"Let's Be Real"	Bruce Leddy	October 1, 2020	000	1.34

=== Season 1 (2021) ===
No.	Title	Directed by	Original release date	Prod. code	U.S. viewers (millions)
1	"Episode 101"	Bruce Leddy	April 29, 2021	101	1.15
2	"Episode 102"	Bruce Leddy	May 6, 2021	102	0.99
3	"Episode 103"	Bruce Leddy	May 13, 2021	103	0.89
4	"Episode 104"	Bruce Leddy	May 20, 2021	104	0.78

== Ratings ==
Viewership and ratings per episode of Let's Be Real
No.	Title	Air date	Rating (18–49)	Viewers (millions)	DVR (18–49)	DVR viewers (millions)	Total (18–49)	Total viewers (millions)
1	"Episode 101"	April 29, 2021	0.2	1.15	0.1	0.44	0.2	1.60
2	"Episode 102"	May 6, 2021	0.2	0.99	0.1	0.26	0.2	1.25
3	"Episode 103"	May 13, 2021	0.2	0.89	0.1	0.25	0.2	1.15
4	"Episode 104"	May 20, 2021	0.2	0.78	0.0	0.13	0.2	0.91
