= Paranormal Activity 4 =

2012 film by Henry Joost and Ariel Schulman

- Theatrical release poster
- Directed by: Henry Joost; Ariel Schulman
- Screenplay by: Christopher Landon
- Story by: Chad Feehan
- Based on: Paranormal Activity by Oren Peli
- Produced by: Jason Blum; Oren Peli
- Starring: Kathryn Newton; Matt Shively; Aiden Lovekamp; Brady Allen; Stephen Dunham; Alexondra Lee; Katie Featherston
- Cinematography: Doug Emmett
- Edited by: Gregory Plotkin
- Production companies: Blumhouse Productions; Solana Films; Room 101, Inc.
- Distributed by: Paramount Pictures
- Release date: October 19, 2012
- Running time: 88 minutes
- Country: United States
- Language: English
- Budget: $5 million
- Box office: $142.8 million

Paranormal Activity 4 is a 2012 American found footage supernatural horror film directed by Henry Joost and Ariel Schulman and written by Christopher Landon. It is the fourth in the Paranormal Activity film series. The film stars Kathryn Newton, Matt Shively, Aiden Lovekamp, Brady Allen, Stephen Dunham, Alexondra Lee, and Katie Featherston, who reprises her role as Katie.

Set in 2011 in Henderson, Nevada, the film follows teenager Alex Nelson as she documents increasingly violent paranormal activity after a boy from the neighboring house begins staying with her family, with the disturbances linked to the events of the earlier films. The film incorporates consumer technology such as Skype and an Xbox Kinect camera into its found-footage format.

Paranormal Activity 4 was released in the United States on October 19, 2012, by Paramount Pictures. Made on a budget of $5 million, it grossed $143 million and received mixed reviews from critics. It was followed by Paranormal Activity: The Marked Ones (2014).

== Plot ==
On October 9, 2006, Kristi Rey and her husband Daniel are killed by her demon-possessed sister Katie, who then abducts Kristi's one-year-old son, Hunter. The only survivor was Ali, Daniel's daughter, who was on a school trip. The police are still unable to find Katie and Hunter. (Note: As depicted in Paranormal Activity 2 (2010).)

In November 2011, Alex Nelson is living in a wealthy suburb of Henderson, Nevada with her father, Doug, her mother, Holly, and her six-year-old brother, Wyatt. Alex frequently records footage with a laptop webcam. After several strange occurrences, she and her boyfriend, Ben, set up cameras throughout the house.

The neighbor has a son, Robbie, who stays at the Nelsons' home, while his mother is hospitalized. Wyatt tells Alex about Robbie's imaginary friend, Toby, and Alex finds Robbie in a closet saying, "He doesn't like you watching us." Wyatt also tells Alex and Ben about meeting "him," revealing a green symbol on his back, identical to an ancient Hittite symbol, used to prepare a victim for demonic possession. They learn that the possession ritual requires a virgin blood sacrifice.

It is then revealed that Robbie's mother is actually Katie. She tells Wyatt that he and Robbie were adopted and that his other family needs him back. He argues with an unseen, unheard presence about his true name, declaring, "My name is not Hunter!". (Note: Wyatt is Hunter, while Robbie is a messenger for the coven. The circumstances of Hunter's adoption by the Nelsons are not explained.)

As the month progresses, there are even more unusual activities, such as Wyatt going into a trance and levitating Alex. One night, a possessed Katie sneaks into the house and tells Wyatt she'll wait until he is "ready." Alex tries to show her parents the footage, but it has been mysteriously erased.

The next day, while Doug and Alex are out, Holly is violently thrown against the ceiling and killed by an unseen force. A few minutes later, Ben arrives to inform Alex about the symbol's relation to a coven. As he sits on Alex's computer chair, Katie appears behind him and before he can react, she snaps his neck and hides his body in the closet. Alex and Doug arrive home at night after dinner, and Doug goes next door, believing he saw Holly and Wyatt. Alex finds Ben's body, and is suddenly knocked down by an unseen force and dragged around. She flees to Katie's home and finds Doug being dragged out of sight. She searches for him when she hears Wyatt's voice, before a demonic Katie runs towards her in a hallway. Alex escapes from Katie by jumping through a window into the yard, where she finds Wyatt and a crowd of women walking towards her. She attempts to flee but Katie appears behind her as the camera falls to the ground and the footage is cut off.

== Cast ==
- Kathryn Newton as Alex Nelson
- Matt Shively as Ben
- Aiden Lovekamp as Wyatt Nelson / Hunter Rey
- Brady Allen as Robbie
- Stephen Dunham as Doug Nelson
- Alexondra Lee as Holly Nelson
- Katie Featherston as Katie
- Georgica Pettus as Sarah Degloshi
- Alisha Boe as Tara
- Brandon Eggertsen as Derek
- Frank Welker as Vocal Effects / Toby

== Production ==
A fourth Paranormal Activity film was first hinted by Paramount domestic distribution head Don Harris in an interview with TheWrap published on October 23, 2011, two days after the United-States-wide release of the third film. As of that day, the entire franchise grossed $450 million on a budget of $8,015,000, the third movie grossing $54 million. Stated Harris, "I can't imagine that we wouldn't make a number four, and I imagine [Paramount Film Group president] Adam Goodman this morning is thinking about the challenge. I'm sure he's thinking, 'Now what do I do?'"

Paramount Pictures announced on January 2, 2012, that Paranormal Activity 4 was in the works. Information on the characters had been scarce, stating that Brady Allen was set to play a character named Robbie. Katie Featherston reprised her role as Katie, who was still possessed from the ending of the first two films, but other cast and characters that appeared in the film were kept under wraps.

Henry Joost and Ariel Schulman returned to direct the film, and their experience in producing documentaries continued to help them with directing a found footage film. Contemporary technologies, such as an Xbox Kinect camera and Skype, were incorporated to make the film realistic to audiences using them and to keep the found footage style innovative.

On June 23, 2012, it was confirmed that the fourth film had begun filming. A trailer debuted on August 3 in front of Total Recall. The first theatrical trailer was released for the film on August 1, 2012. The trailer showed that the film is a sequel to Paranormal Activity 2, following the story of a possessed Katie and Hunter after their disappearance at the end of the second film. The movie also featured a new scare technique, of footage being shown from a laptop in a video chat, that the directors felt would rival the 'fan cam' from the previous movie and that because of it being familiar technology it was "built for a horror movie". The movie also featured an Xbox Kinect, a MacBook Pro, smartphones and a Canon XA10.

The end credits of the film include a dedication to actor Stephen Dunham, who played Alex's father Doug. Dunham died shortly after filming was completed, suffering a heart attack on September 14, 2012, which was his forty-eighth birthday.

== Release ==
=== Marketing ===
Since its January 2012 announcement, most of the information on the plot, cast, and shooting location was unknown before its release.

With Paranormal Activity 4, Paramount continued the marketing method of holding "demand" advanced screenings and airing commercials with footage of audience reactions. On September 24, 2012, a 30-second teaser was exclusively released on Digital Spy's website.

As part of the promotional campaign for Paranormal Activity 4, the studio created a group of online accounts, including a YouTube account under the name “Jacob Degloshi”. In a series of posted videos set a year after the events of the film, Alex Nelson's friend Sarah, who appears in the film itself, is chased by Tobi while her father researches VHS tapes that include previously unreleased footage from the second and third films.

=== Home media ===
The film was released on DVD and Blu-ray on January 29, 2013. It grossed $9.8 million in home sales.

The post-credits scene teases Paranormal Activity: The Marked Ones, which is a Latino spin-off of the Paranormal Activity series released on January 3, 2014. The post-credits scene was taken out of the film when the DVD was released.

== Reception ==
=== Box office ===
==== Domestic ====
Domestically, Paranormal Activity 4 did not perform as well as Paranormal Activity 2 or Paranormal Activity 3. It debuted with $4.8 million in midnight showings. That made it the third highest in midnight grosses for a horror film behind only its predecessors, Paranormal Activity 3 ($8 million) and Paranormal Activity 2 ($6.3 million). It then grossed $15 million in its opening day, also lower than the third film ($26.2 million) and second film ($20.1 million), bringing its total to $29 million in its opening weekend. 60% of audiences that viewed it on opening weekend were under 25, and it had an equal portion of male and female watchers.

Before the opening weekend, some analysts predicted Paranormal Activity 4 to start at number-one but with a lesser gross than its predecessor. Box Office Mojo's Ray Subers cited examples of the like of fourth films in other franchises, such as Saw IV (2007), Shrek Forever After (2010), and Pirates of the Caribbean: On Stranger Tides (2011); and Grady Smith brought up the film's negative initial reviews and possible competition with another supernatural horror film Sinister. Ultimately, however, the opening weekend gross was lower than the projected numbers, including Paramount's range of $35 million–$40 million, and analysts' numbers of $40 million–$42.1 million.

After the weekend, Smith suspected the 9 a.m. Thursday screening time allowed for negative word of mouth to get out sooner and that competition from Sinister hurt its potential. Brooks Barnes of The New York Times suggested negative critical reception and viewer fatigue from the franchise as well as found footage films trying to replicate it harmed interest in Paranormal Activity 4. Megan Colligan, the president of domestic distribution for Paramount, attributed the lower-than-expected numbers to a market saturation of sequels plus the film's bigger focus on international marketing.

The film was predicated by Smith, since after the opening weekend, to have a front-loaded run, where most audiences rush to see the film on opening weekend only for its numbers to decline dramatically in later weeks; he cited a 38% drop in gross from Friday to Saturday ($15.1 million–$9.4 million) and the fact that front-loaded features are the most prominent in the horror genre. On the second weekend, Paranormal Activity 4 went down to fourth place, grossing $8.5 million; the total by the second weekend, $42.5 million, was $10 million lower than the opening weekend of the previous film alone, and its 71% drop was the deepest in the series, lower than the third film's 66% second-week drop. The top-15 of the weekend also included newly entered films also underperforming, such as Cloud Atlas, Silent Hill: Revelation, Fun Size, and Chasing Mavericks; which Subers suggested allowed Argo, in its third week, to take the number-one spot.

==== Worldwide ====
Paranormal Activity 4 improved on the predecessors in terms of international numbers; it opened in 24 countries with an opening weekend gross of $26.4 million, 11% higher than that of the third installment. That weekend, it opened at number one in Australia, Germany, Mexico, and Brazil; number two in the United Kingdom and Russia; and number four in Spain. The next weekend, the number of countries playing the movie expanded to 45, and it grossed $14.1 million bringing the total to $48.3 million; a nation where the film debuted then included the Netherlands, where it opened in second place. It grossed another $14.3 million the next weekend (now having a $68.8 million total gross) with only six national markets added and more strong debuts in countries like France and Japan.

In the United Kingdom, a Cineworld location in Nottingham accidentally screened the start of the film rather than the DreamWorks animated film, Madagascar 3: Europe's Most Wanted. Similar events happened in the US in 2007, with screenings of The Hills Have Eyes 2 instead of The Last Mimzy, in 2010 with screenings of Saw 3D instead of Megamind and in 2015 with an accidental screening of Insidious: Chapter 3 instead of Inside Out.

=== Critical response ===
On Rotten Tomatoes the film holds an approval rating of 23% based upon 112 reviews, with an average rating of 4.20/10. The website's consensus stated that "While it does manage to wring a few more screams out of the franchise's surprisingly durable premise, Paranormal Activity 4 provides fans of the series with dismayingly diminishing returns." On Metacritic the film has a score of 40 out of 100 based on reviews from 22 critics, indicating "mixed or average reviews". Audiences polled by CinemaScore gave the film a grade C, on a scale from A+ to F.

Drew McWeeny gave the film a C+, saying that while he felt that the film "played it safe", he still found the film to be shameful. Shaun Munro also reacted negatively, saying that he felt that the film would only be enjoyed by the "die-hard" fans of the previous films in the franchise. Ryan Lambie reacted negatively, giving the film a rating of 2/5, and saying that the film did not introduce any new ideas. Scott Weinberg gave a positive review, saying that there was "some fun" to be had in the film, also felt that the film would likely only be enjoyed by fans of the previous films. Fred Topel also gave a positive review, saying that the film included iconography from some classic horror films.

=== Accolades ===
Kathryn Newton won the Young Artist Award in the category Best Performance in a Feature Film - Leading Young Actress at the 34th Young Artist Awards in 2013.

== Spin-off ==
Paranormal Activity 4 was followed by Paranormal Activity: The Marked Ones, released on January 3, 2014.
