= Bruce Leddy =

American comedy writer, director, and producer

Bruce Leddy is a comedy writer, director, and producer. His credits include the Fox political satire series Let's Be Real, the MTV/Universal feature How High 2, segment directing for John Oliver's Last Week Tonight on HBO, Taraji Henson's White Hot Holidays on Fox, and writing humor pieces for The New Yorker online. Prior credits include directing episodes of Nickelodeon's School of Rock, the ABC sitcom Cougar Town starring Courteney Cox, and the pilots for Disney's I Didn't Do It, Nickelodeon's The Haunted Hathaways, and Comedy Central's "Midnight with Anthony Jeselnik." Other projects include directing "Important Things with Demetri Martin" for Comedy Central, the pilot and multiple episodes of Disney XD's Crash & Bernstein, and sketch segments for "Jimmy Kimmel Live!" His award-winning independent film "The Wedding Weekend" (f/k/a "Shut Up & Sing") is available on Netflix, Amazon, and iTunes, after airing on The Sundance Channel. It stars David Harbour, Molly Shannon, Rosemarie DeWitt, and Mark Feuerstein.

== Career ==
After graduating from Williams College, Leddy started his career at MTV Networks in New York City as a writer for VH1. He quickly became a producer, and joined sister channel MTV where he rose to Senior Producer/Writer. After overseeing studio-based shows and VJ segments, Leddy developed and produced multiple series for the network, including the in-depth artist profile series "MTV Rockumentary," the pilot and first 7 episodes of "MTV Unplugged," and MTV's "Half Hour Comedy Hour."

After 7 years with MTV, Leddy went freelance and formed the production company BLIP Inc. (Bruce Leddy Independent Productions). He continued to work with MTV, producing, writing, and directing one-hour comedy specials financed by the movie studios as promotional vehicles for their films. Several of these starred Mike Myers including the "MTV Wayne's World" and "Wayne's World II Specials," and "Austin Powers' Electric Pussycat Swinger's Club," a show styled after the psychedelic '70's comedy series Laugh In, and Playboy After Dark. He also directed comedy specials for HBO, Showtime, and Comedy Central, as well as a muppet holiday movie for Fox broadcast and Sony Home Video called CinderElmo, starring Kathy Najimy, Oliver Platt, Keri Russell and French Stewart for which he received a DGA Awards nomination.

During production of an MTV special promoting the Mike Myers TriStar Pictures film "So I Married an Axe Murderer," Leddy was offered the chance to direct his first feature film, a coming of age comedy called Bad With Numbers. The film starred Jason London, Tia Carrere, Jeffrey Tambor, Alexandra Lee, and Zak Orth. Two months before the film was to have a 1200 screen theatrical release, the distributing studio Savoy Pictures went bankrupt and the film was left in limbo. Eventually it was acquired by Trimark Pictures, and under the title My Teacher's Wife aired numerous times on the USA Network, and was released on DVD.

== Move to Los Angeles ==
In 2000, Leddy moved to Los Angeles, and began a directing job at Fox's late night sketch comedy show MADtv. A two-week tryout became a 9-season run, with Leddy becoming the primary director, logging over 200 episodes, and eventually becoming Co-Show Runner/Executive Producer. Leddy continued to freelance on the MTV Movie Awards and MTV Video Music Awards. He wrote and directed the opening short film for the 1999 MTV Movie Awards, The Pitch (Titanic II), starring Ben Stiller, Vince Vaughn, and James Cameron. He also directed short films with Marlon Wayans and Shawn Wayans when they hosted the VMAs in 2000.

In 2005, Leddy wrote, directed and produced the independent film Shut Up & Sing, an ensemble comedy/drama about a group of guys who sang together in a college a cappella group who reunite 15 years later to sing at a friend's wedding. With renowned casting director Avy Kaufman, Leddy assembled a cast of New York-based performers including David Harbour, Molly Shannon, Mark Feuerstein, Rosemarie DeWitt, Elizabeth Reaser, and Reg Rogers. The film was shot on location in New York City and East Hampton, NY. On the festival circuit, the movie won 9 awards including the Audience Award/Best Picture at the HBO U.S. Comedy Arts Festival in Aspen. Just prior to a limited theatrical release by Strand Releasing, the Weinstein Company announced they were naming their previously untitled Dixie Chicks documentary "Shut Up & Sing". A brief legal skirmish ensued and Leddy was forced to re-title his film, first as Sing Now or Forever Hold Your Peace, and then for international sales purposes, as The Wedding Weekend,. It was acquired by First Look Studios and released in May 2008 on DVD. In May 2010, the film began airing on The Sundance Channel and is currently available on streaming and AVOD platforms.

== Filmography ==
- How High 2 - 2019
- The Wedding Weekend (f/k/a Shut & Sing) - 2006
- CinderElmo - 1999
- Bill Bellamy: Booty Call - 1996
- My Teacher's Wife (a.k.a. Bad with Numbers) - 1995

== Awards and nominations ==
- 2000, nominated for DGA Award for 'Outstanding Directorial Achievement in Children's Programs' for CinderElmo
- 2006, won 'Audience Award/Best Picture' at U.S. Comedy Arts Festival for Shut Up and Sing
- 2006, won 'Audience Award' at Rhode Island International Film Festival for Shut Up and Sing
- 2006, won 'Audience Award' at Breckenridge Festival of Film for Shut Up and Sing
- 2006, won 'President Award for Independent Feature' at Ft. Lauderdale International Film Festival for Shut Up and Sing
