= Greenland, Nova Scotia =

Community in Nova Scotia, Canada

Coordinates: 44°35′1.04″N 65°34′22.24″W

Greenland in Nova Scotia

Greenland is a community in the Canadian province of Nova Scotia, located in Annapolis County and is at an elevation of approximately 180m. It was settled in the 1780s by disbanded German troops following the American Revolutionary War.
