= Susan Kaiser Greenland =

American author and teacher

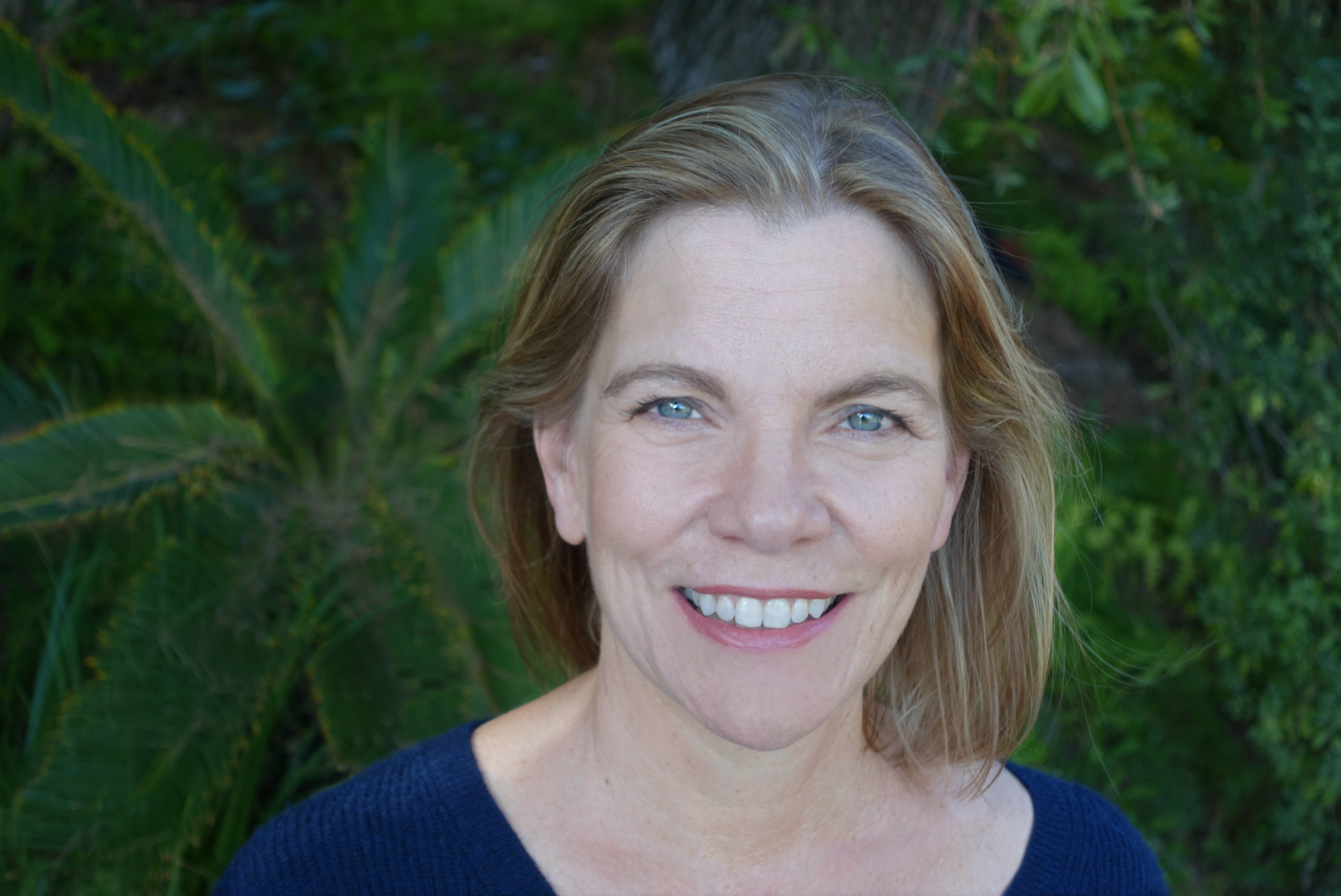
- Born: October 1, 1956; Kalamazoo, Michigan
- Occupation(s): Author, teacher
- Website: www.susankaisergreenland.com

Susan Kaiser Greenland (born October 1, 1956) is an American author and teacher of mindfulness and meditation, practicing a state of present-moment awareness to develop overall attentiveness and social/emotional skills. Susan played a foundational role in making mindfulness practices developmentally appropriate for young people, and with her first book The Mindful Child she helped pioneer activity-based mindfulness. This technique is now practiced in American schools throughout the country to help children learn how to reduce and alleviate their stress levels.

== Biography ==
Susan Kaiser Greenland was born in Kalamazoo, Michigan in 1956. She attended Paw Paw High School and Kalamazoo College, and graduated from Brooklyn Law School. She is a retired corporate lawyer admitted to practice in New York and California. In 1993, a family crisis prompted her to seek alternative methods of reducing stress, which resulted in her meditation studies with teachers from the Tibetan Buddhist tradition since 1997. She lives in Los Angeles with her husband. They have two grown children.

== Career ==
Kaiser Greenland represented ABC network-owned radio and television stations from 1988 to 1993, and CBS network-owned radio and television stations from 1994 to 2005. While working as a lawyer she volunteered in schools teaching secular mindfulness. During her volunteer work she developed the Inner Kids program, a hybrid of classical mindfulness and meditation practices that she adapted for children and families. Kaiser Greenland eventually left her law practice to teach mindfulness and meditation full-time.

Kaiser Greenland and her husband, Seth Greenland, founded The InnerKids Foundation, a not-for-profit organization that taught secular mindfulness in schools and community-based programs in the greater Los Angeles area from 2001 through 2009.

She currently works in the United States and abroad as an author, public speaker, and educator on the subject of sharing secular mindfulness and meditation with children and families. She has served on the clinical team of the Pediatric Pain Clinic at UCLA Mattel Children’s Hospital; the Garrison Institute for Contemplation and Education Leadership Council; as an advisor at the UCLA Family Commons; and has contributed to the online news periodical, The Huffington Post.

Susan was a co-investigator on a UCLA research study on the impact of mindfulness in education and, in 2006, was recognized as a "Champion for our Children" by First 5 LA. She served on the Board of the Directors of The Foundation for a Mindful Society, publisher of Mindful Magazine.

Currently she serves on the advisory board for Tergar Schools and is a Mind and Life Fellow.

== Publications ==
=== Books ===
- Real-World Enlightenment Discovering Ordinary Magic in EveryDay Life (Shambhala, 2024)
- Mindful Games (Shambhala, 2016)
- The Mindful Child (Free Press, 2010)

=== Audiobooks and cards ===
- Mindful Parent, Mindful Child Simple Mindfulness Practices for Busy Parents (audiobook by Sounds True 2019)
- Mindful Games Activity Cards with Annaka Harris (Shambhala, 2017)

=== Forewords ===
- “Foreword: Teaching Mindfulness Skills to Kids and Teens”, C. Willard, A. Saltzman, (Guilford, 2015).
- “Foreword: The Autism Playbook for Teens”, Irene McHenry and Carol Moog, (Instant Help, 2014)

=== Chapters ===
- B. Galla, D. Black, and S. Kaiser Greenland, “The Use of Mindful Awareness Practices to Promote Attention and Executive Function in Childhood: The Effects of the ‘Inner Kids’ Program,” Handbook of Mindfulness in Education K. Schonert-Reichl and R. Roeser (Ed.) (Springer, 2016).
- T. Goodman and S. Kaiser Greenland, D. Siegel, “Mindful Parenting as a Path to Wisdom and Compassion” Wisdom and Compassion in Psychotherapy, C. Germer, R. Siegel (Ed.)(Guilford, 2012).
- T. Goodman and S. Kaiser Greenland, “Mindfulness with Children: Working with Difficult Emotions,” Clinical Handbook of Mindfulness, F. Didonna (Ed.)(Springer, 2009)

=== Research ===
- “Effects of Mindful Awareness Practices on Executive Functions in Elementary School Children,” Journal of Applied School Psychology. Volume 26, Issue 1 (2010). L. Flook, S.L. Smalley, M.J. Kitil, B. Galla, S. Kaiser Greenland, J. Locke, E. Ishijima, and C. Kasari.
