= Norman Hollyn =

American film editor (1952–2019)

- Born: May 11, 1952; New York, United States
- Died: March 17, 2019 (aged 66); Yokohama, Kanagawa, Japan
- Occupation: Film editor

Norman Hollyn (May 11, 1952 – March 17, 2019) was an American film editor and Michael Kahn Endowed Chair in Editing at the University of Southern California School of Cinematic Arts.

== Biography ==
Hollyn was born in New York on May 11, 1952, and attended Stony Brook University. He taught at the University of Southern California as the first Michael Kahn Endowed Chair in Editing within the School of Cinematic Arts. Hollyn died in Yokohama, Japan, on March 17, 2019, where he was serving as a guest lecturer at the Tokyo University of the Arts.

== Selected filmography ==
- Daniel and the Towers (1987)
- Heathers (1988)
- Meet the Applegates (1990)
- The Local Stigmatic (1990)
- Jersey Girl (1992)
- It's Pat (1994)
- Girl in the Cadillac (1995)
- My Teacher's Wife (1995)
- Mad Dog Time (1996)
- Quicksilver Highway (1997)
- Under Wraps (1997)
- Shot (2017)
