= Greenland Township, Washington County, Arkansas =

Township of Greenland
- Township
- Location of Greenland Township in Washington County

- Location of Washington County in Arkansas
- Coordinates: 35°59′50″N 94°10′21″W
- Country: United States
- State: Arkansas
- County: Washington

Area
  - Total: 23.2 sq mi (60 km^{2})
  - Land: 23.1 sq mi (60 km^{2})
  - Water: 0.1 sq mi (0.26 km^{2}) 0%
- Elevation: 1,260 ft (380 m)

Population (2020)
  - Total: 1,213
  - Density: 302.27/sq mi (116.71/km^{2})
- Time zone: UTC-6 (CST)
  - Summer (DST): UTC-5 (CDT)
- Area code: 479
- GNIS feature ID: 69789

Greenland Township is one of thirty-seven townships in Washington County, Arkansas, USA. As of the 2020 census, its total population was 1,213.

== Geography ==
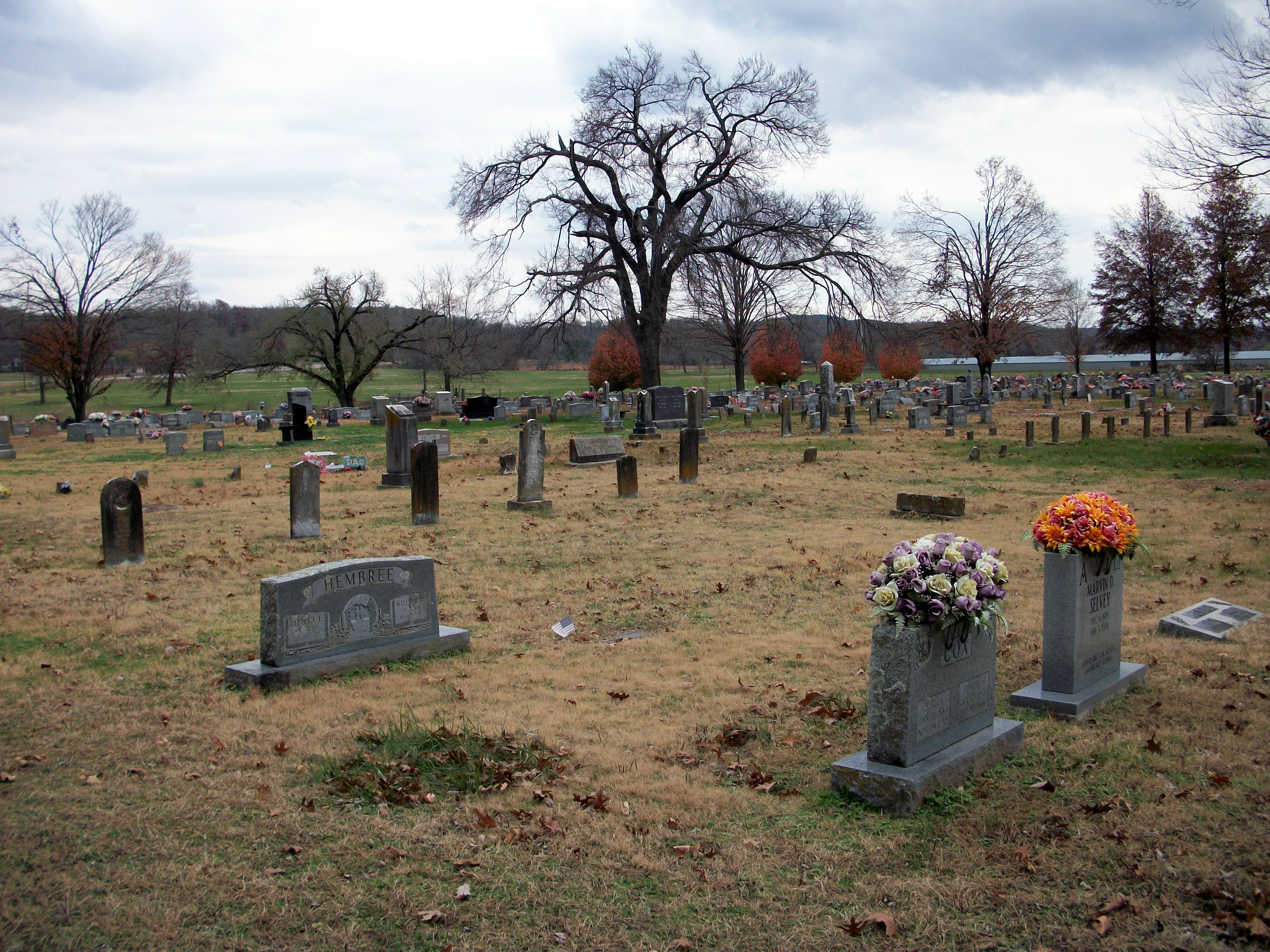
Baptist Ford Cemetery near the former alignment of US 71 in south Greenland Township.

According to the United States Census Bureau, Greenland Township covers an area of 23.2 square miles (60 km^{2}), with 23.1 square miles (60 km^{2}) of land and 0.1 square miles (0.26 km^{2}) of water.

=== Cities, towns, villages ===
- Greenland

=== Cemeteries ===
The township contains Boone Cemetery, Rieff Chapel Cemetery, Shaeffer Cemetery, Baptist Ford (Union) Cemetery, and Wilson Cemetery.

=== Major routes ===
- Interstate 49
- U.S. Route 71
- Arkansas Highway 265
