= SS Santa Kyriaki =

1945 Cargo ship

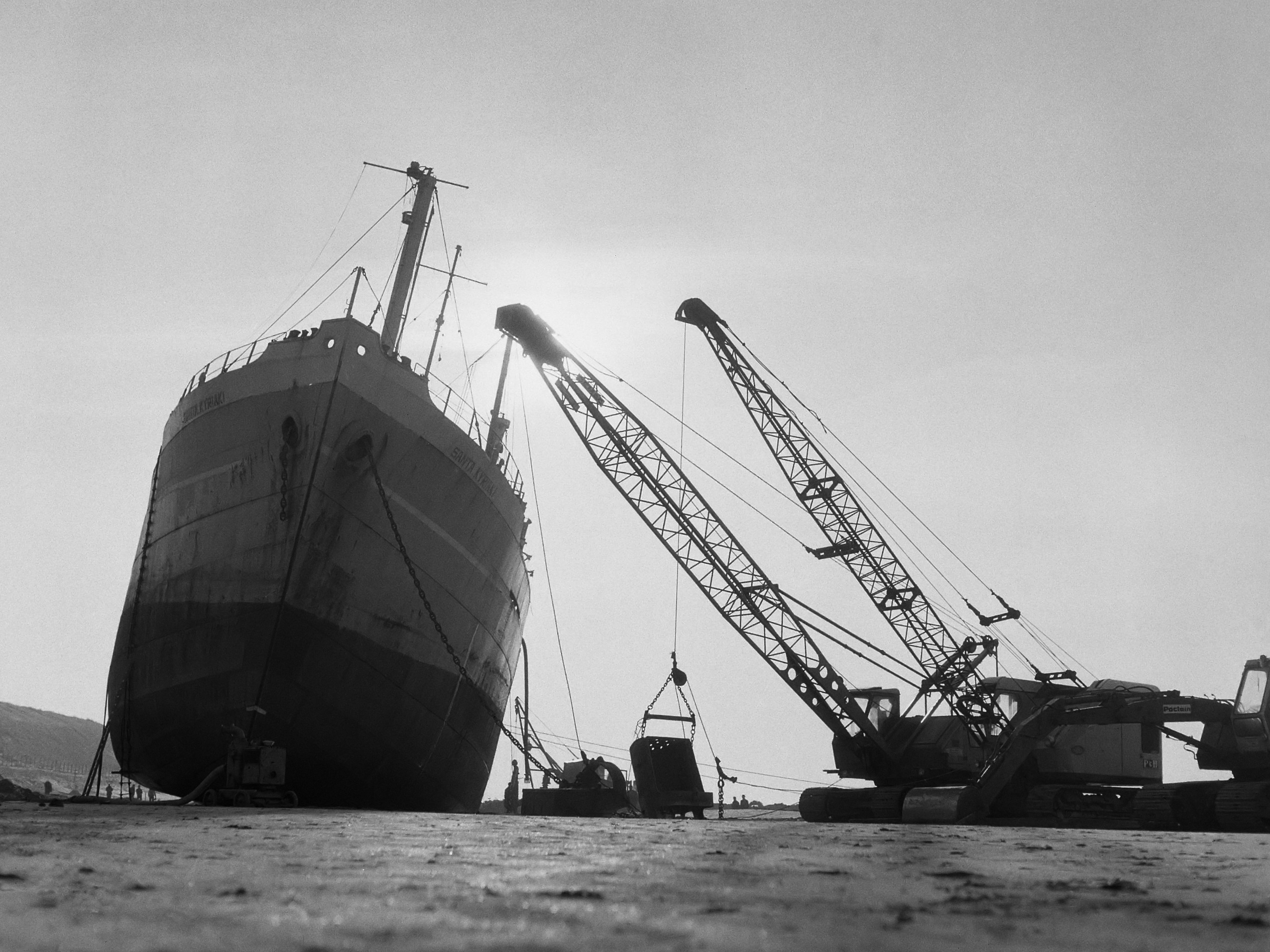
- Santa Kyriaki stranded on the Dutch coast, 1966

History
- Name: Empire Crusoe (1945-46); Greenland (1946-55); Heminge (1955-56); Maria Luisa (1956-63); Santa Kyriaki (1963-66)
- Owner: Ministry of War Transport (1945); Ministry of Transport (1945-46); Currie Line Ltd (1946-55); Constants Ltd (1955-56); Socoa Shipping Ltd (1956-63); Nereide Compagnia Maritime SA (1963-66)
- Operator: unknown manager (1945-46); Currie Line Ltd (1946-55); Constants Ltd (1955-56); Ramon de la Sota (1956-63); Nereide Compagnia Maritime SA (1963-66)
- Port of registry: United Kingdom (1945-46); (United Kingdom) Leith (1946-55); (United Kingdom) Cardiff (1955-56); (Liberia) Monrovia (1956-66)
- Builder: Ailsa Shipbuilding Co
- Yard number: 448
- Launched: 11 April 1945
- Completed: October 1945
- Out of service: 24 November 1965
- Fate: Scrapped

General characteristics
- Type: Cargo ship
- Tonnage: 2,958 GRT
- Length: 315 ft (96 m)
- Beam: 46 ft (14 m)
- Propulsion: Triple expansion steam engine, single screw propeller
- Complement: 17

Santa Kyriaki was a 2,958 GRT cargo ship that was built in 1945 as Empire Crusoe by Ailsa Shipbuilding Co, Troon, Ayrshire, Scotland for the Ministry of War Transport (MoWT). She was sold in 1946 and renamed Greenland and a further sale in 1955 saw her renamed Heminge. In 1956, she was sold to Liberia and renamed Maria Luisa. A sale in 1963 to a Panamanian company saw her renamed Santa Kyriaki. She served until running aground off IJmuiden, Netherlands in 1965 and was scrapped in 1966.

== Description ==
The ship was built in 1945 by Ailsa Shipbuilding Co, Troon, Ayrshire. She was Yard Number 448.

The ship was 315 feet (96 m) long, with a beam of 46 feet (14 m). She was assessed at 2,958 GRT.

The ship was propelled by a triple expansion steam engine.

== History ==
Empire Crusoe was built for the MoWT, which later became the Ministry of Transport. In 1946, she was sold to Currie Line Ltd, Leith, Midlothian and was renamed Greenland. In 1955, she was sold to Constants Ltd, Cardiff, Glamorgan and renamed Heminge. She was sold the next year to Socoa Shipping Co Ltd, Monrovia, Liberia, and renamed Maria Luisa. She was operated under the management of Ramon de la Sota, France, remaining under the Liberian flag. In 1963, Maria Luisa was sold to Nereide Compagnia Maritime SA, Panama and renamed Santa Kyriaki.

On 24 November 1965, Santa Kyriaki was in ballast off the coast of the Netherlands when she was caught in a Force 10-11 storm. The Dutch tug Titan offered assistance to Santa Kyriaki, which was refused. At 15:00 CET (14:00 GMT), Santa Kyriaki came ashore south of IJmuiden. Her 17 crew were taken off by a Koninklijke Marine helicopter. After the storm had subsided, Santa Kyriaki became a temporary tourist attraction. On 30 December, the contract for the salvage of the ship was awarded to Bureau Wijsmuller under Lloyds Open Form conditions. Over 70,000 cubic yards (54,000 m^{3}) of sand was excavated to form a basin which enabled Santa Kyriaki to be turned through 60°. She was refloated on 8 March 1966 with assistance from the tugs Titan and Simson, aided by the use of her own engine. Titan towed her into IJmuiden, where she was declared to be a constructive total loss. She was later towed to Amsterdam. Santa Kyriaki arrived under tow on 17 July 1966 at Avilés, Spain for scrapping.
