= Seth Greenland =

American novelist, screenwriter, and playwright (born 1955)

- Born: July 22, 1955 (age 70); New York City, U.S.
- Education: Connecticut College (BA); New York University (MFA)
- Occupations: Novelist, Playwright, Screenwriter

Seth Greenland (born July 22, 1955) is an American novelist, playwright and screenwriter.

== Early life and education ==
Seth Greenland was born in New York City and grew up in Scarsdale, New York. He is the son of Leo Greenland, CEO of Smith/Greenland Advertising, and Rita Greenland, an advertising executive. He has a younger brother. Greenland graduated from Scarsdale High School, received a BA from Connecticut College and an MFA at NYU.

While in graduate school Greenland contributed to the SoHo Weekly News, Andy Warhol's Interview Magazine, and wrote a piece for Parade Magazine about the emerging comedy scene of the late 1970s. Before becoming a full-time writer he worked as a construction worker, lobster fisherman, and in the early 1980s, sold cable television subscriptions door-to-door in Los Angeles.

== Career ==
After college, Greenland first worked as a copyboy at the New York Daily News. He later worked on several projects with comedian Richard Belzer, sold jokes to Joan Rivers and wrote a spec television script that came to the attention of Norman Lear who hired him to work on the ABC series AKA Pablo, a sitcom about an Hispanic family starring Paul Rodriguez.

Greenland subsequently moved back to New York from Los Angeles, where he began to write screenplays and plays. In the early 90s, he co-wrote (with Larry David) and directed a short film called The Dairy Lobbyist starring Larry David that aired on VH-1. In 1995, Greenland wrote the screenplay for the New Line hip-hop comedy, Who's The Man?, starring Dr. Dre and Ed Lover and directed by Ted Demme. By 2003, he had returned to television writing as a writer-producer for the final season on the HBO comedy Arli$$, and for two seasons on the HBO drama Big Love.

Greenland's first produced play was Girls in Movies (1987). He received a Kennedy Center/American Express Fund For New American Plays Award and production grant for his second play, Jungle Rot (1994). The play is about a CIA plot to assassinate the Congolese president, Patrice Lumumba, based on the CIA station chief posted in the Congo in 1960 Larry Devlin. Jungle Rot won an American Theater Critics Association Award (1996). Greenland went on to write two more plays, Red Memories (1996) and Jerusalem (2001). Red Memories was produced in 1996 at New York Stage and Film, in a production directed by the actor Roger Rees, and Jerusalem was produced in 2001 at the Cleveland Playhouse in a production directed by Peter Hackett.

In 2005, Greenland published his first novel, The Bones, which the LA Times called "a remarkable debut." His next book, Shining City, was named as a Washington Post Best Book of 2008. Greenland published his third novel, The Angry Buddhist, in 2012. The New York Times called his novel from 2015, I Regret Everything, "affecting and funny." His fifth novel, The Hazards of Good Fortune (2018) was a bestseller in France (titled Mécanique de la chute) where it was a finalist for the Prix du Meilleur Livre Etranger and also a finalist for the Grand Prix de Litterature Americaine. In 2020 he published A Kingdom of Tender Colors: A Memoir of Comedy, Survival, and Love, which the Los Angeles Review of Books described as “acutely observed, well-written and leavened with humor.” In 2023 he published his sixth novel in France, Plan Americain.

In addition to his books, he has contributed to the Los Angeles Times, the Los Angeles Review of Books, Lion’s Roar, Le Figaro, Le Monde, L’Express, Quillette and the Jewish Journal.

== Personal life ==
He lives in Los Angeles with his wife, the author and mindfulness teacher Susan Kaiser Greenland. They have two grown children.

== Works ==
=== Books ===
- The Bones (2005)
- Shining City (2008)
- The Angry Buddhist (2012)
- I Regret Everything (2015)
- The Hazards of Good Fortune (2018)
- A Kingdom of Tender Colors: A Memoir of Comedy, Survival, and Love (Europa Editions, 2020)
- Plan Americain (Editions Liana Levi, 2023, French edition)

=== Plays ===
- Girls In Movies (1987)
- Jungle Rot (1994)
- Red Memories (1996)
- Jerusalem (2001)

=== TV/film ===
- Who's the Man? (1993)
- My Teacher's Wife (1995)
- Arli$$ (2003)
- Big Love (2010-2011)

=== Anthologies ===
- Best Plays of 1995-1996
- The Devil's Punchbowl (2010)
- Cape Cod Noir (2011)
- Yes Is The Answer (2013)

== Recognition ==
- Kennedy Center/American Express Fund For New American Plays Award (1993)
- American Theater Critics Association Award (1996)
- Finalist, Prix du Meilleur Livre Etranger (2019)
- Finalist, Grand Prix de Literature Américaine (2019)
