= The Phenom (film) =

- Theatrical release poster
- Directed by: Noah Buschel
- Written by: Noah Buschel
- Produced by: Jeff Rice; Jeff Elliott
- Starring: Johnny Simmons; Yul Vazquez; Sophie Kennedy Clark; Paul Giamatti; Ethan Hawke
- Cinematography: Ryan Samul
- Music by: Aleks de Carvalho
- Production companies: Best Pitcher; Bron Capital Partners; Crystal Wealth
- Distributed by: RLJ Entertainment
- Release dates: April 17, 2016 (Tribeca Film Festival); June 24, 2016 (United States)
- Running time: 90 minutes
- Country: United States
- Language: English

The Phenom is a 2016 American sports drama film written and directed by Noah Buschel, starring Johnny Simmons, Paul Giamatti, and Ethan Hawke. The film was released on June 24, 2016, by RLJ Entertainment.

== Premise ==
A talented young pitcher struggles to throw strikes. The major league club sends him to a sports psychologist, where memories of his abusive father come to light.

== Cast ==
- Johnny Simmons as Hopper Gibson
- Ethan Hawke as Hopper Gibson Sr.
- Paul Giamatti as Dr. Mobley
- Yul Vazquez as Eddie Soler
- Sophie Kennedy Clark as Dorothy Boyer
- Marin Ireland as Rachel Cullum
- Elizabeth Marvel as June Epland
- Louisa Krause as Candace Cassidy
- Alison Elliott as Susan Gibson
- Paul Adelstein as Scott Borwitz

== Production ==
The Phenom was shot primarily in Atlanta, Georgia. Principal photography wrapped on December 20, 2014. Hawke had previously considered taking a part in Buschel's second film, 2007's Neal Cassady, and the two became friendly after that.

== Critical reception ==
On the film-review aggregator Rotten Tomatoes, the film has an approval rating of 79% based on 47 reviews, with an average rating of 6.50/10. The site's consensus is, "Powerfully acted and emotionally affecting, The Phenom proves a baseball movie can step away from the mound and still deliver a heater down the middle." On Metacritic, the film holds a score of 66 out of 100 based on reviews from 15 critics, indicating "generally favorable reviews".

The Village Voice said, "The Phenom is the baseball movie Robert Altman never made. Simmons is a wonder." The Hollywood Reporter described the film as "suffused with insight and intelligence," adding, "the film is another noteworthy effort from the writer/director of such intriguing if unfortunately little-seen dramas as Glass Chin and Sparrows Dance." The Los Angeles Times called it "an unusual and affecting baseball drama where nearly all the action is internal." Matt Prigge of Metro New York wrote that "Noah Buschel might be one of indies' most interesting filmmakers, all the more so because he doesn't belong to any easily promotable group or even genre." Nick Allen of RogerEbert.com wrote, "A welcome surprise for sports cinema.". Ethan Sacks of New York Daily News noted "Every once in a while an indie drama actually throws a curve... The Phenom is a "W" for writer-director Noah Buschel... Johnny Simmons' Hopper Jr. has been taught to never show emotion on the mound. Save some of that for the people in the audience." Neil Genzlinger of The New York Times wrote, "It's a variation of all those children's movies and TV shows in which a Little Leaguer or pee-wee football player is browbeaten by a parent trying to relive his or her own childhood. The director and writer, Noah Buschel, has no fresh insights to add to the well-worn dynamic and doesn't give the actors or audience much to work with."

== Release ==
The film premiered at the Tribeca Film Festival on April 17, 2016. The film was released on June 24, 2016, by RLJ Entertainment.

== See also ==
- List of baseball films
