= Niesha Butler =

American basketball player (born 1980)

Personal information
- Born: September 3, 1980 (age 45) Brooklyn, New York, U.S.
- Listed height: 5 ft 8 in (1.73 m)

Career information
- College: Georgia Tech (1998–2002)
- Position: Guard

Career highlights
- ACC Rookie of the Year (1999); ACC All-Freshman Team (1999)

La Niesha Alice Butler (born September 3, 1980) is an American basketball player, actress, and entrepreneur, of Aruban and Puerto Rican descent, best known as a member of the New York Liberty, sideline reporter for the Atlanta Hawks, and founder of Ballin Technologies. She is often featured in films related to sport. She has also worked as a sideline reporter for various outfits including CBS Radio, MSG Network, and CUNY TV.

== Biography ==
=== Early life ===
Niesha was born in Brooklyn, New York and spent her early childhood in Aruba before permanently settling down in New York. Despite being small enough in stature to earn the nickname ‘Munchkin,’ she became the first girl to play for Gauchos, a powerhouse AAU team. She attended Incarnation, where she was an integral part of the varsity team's several championship seasons.

She later attended Columbia Prep where she led the team to several league championships. After transferring to Riverdale Country School, she broke New York's record for points scored in a high school career for both men and women. She was named to the New York City's All City Team four years in a row, the only person to do so since Kareem Abdul-Jabbar.

=== Early sports career ===
She attended Incarnation Catholic School in the Washington Heights part of Manhattan.

She was the all-time leader for New York City high schools in career points scored—for men or women—in basketball. Scored 3,127 points in High School, with a 28 points per game average. She wears the number 11. In 2005, Niesha signed with the New York Liberty. After she got cut from the team she went on to play in FIBA for Gran Caneria for one season before retiring from playing.

She was personally recruited for Georgia Tech by Stephon Marbury.

=== College career ===
After being personally recruited by Stephon Marbury, Niesha announced that she would attend Georgia Tech. In her first season she led the ACC in scoring and was the first female player from Georgia Tech to be named rookie of the year. She was honored with the Naismith Georgia Player of the Year award, and was named to the Freshman All American Team.

=== Georgia Tech statistics ===
Legend
GP	Games played	GS	Games started	MPG	Minutes per game
FG%	Field goal percentage	3P%	3-point field goal percentage	FT%	Free throw percentage
RPG	Rebounds per game	APG	Assists per game	SPG	Steals per game
BPG	Blocks per game	PPG	Points per game	**Bold**	Career high

Year	Team	GP	Points	FG%	3P%	FT%	RPG	APG	SPG	BPG	PPG
1998-99	Georgia Tech	27	**521**	40.0%	0.4%	0.7%	**5.0**	**4.4**	1.7	**0.7**	**19.3**
1999-00	Georgia Tech	4	53	**43.8%**	**33.3%**	72.7%	4.3	3.0	**2.8**	0.5	13.3
2000-01	Georgia Tech	**28**	438	38.0%	32.1%	**72.8%**	3.4	2.6	1.9	0.2	15.6
2001-02	Georgia Tech	6	47	29.5%	16.7%	47.4%	4.2	1.5	1.5	0.2	7.8
Career		65	1059	38.7%	32.8%	70.2%	4.2	3.3	1.8	0.5	16.3

== Acting career ==
She starred opposite Adrian Grenier in Noah Buschel's Bringing Rain. She had a brief appearance in Spike Lee's 2004 film She Hate Me. She was also considered for the lead role in Love and Basketball, opposite Omar Epps, but was ultimately looked over in favor of actress Sanaa Lathan despite producer Spike Lee's advice. According to writer & director Gina Prince-Bythewood " I saw over 700 people for the part–actors, ballplayers, people who had never acted before in their life. It finally came down to Sanaa and Niesha I put Sanaa with a basketball coach for two months and Niesha with an acting coach.” Prince-Bythewood ultimately decided that it was a love story first—which is why she ultimately went with Lathan

She also appeared in the first Nike-LeBron James commercial.

== In magazines ==
She was on the cover of the first annual The Village Voice's Women In Sports. She also posed for King Magazine, Mar/Apr 2004 - Article title: 'WNBA's Next Sexy Shooter.'

== Professional career ==
=== Broadcasting ===
Niesha went on to have a successful career in broadcasting, working for CBS radio, TMZ sports, and as a producer and side line reporter for the Atlanta Hawks.

== Business career ==
Niesha has always had an entrepreneurial mind set since she started her first business selling t-shirts at ten years old. As an adult she worked on the NYMEX for MBF Corporation in Crude Oil and Natural Gas. When her playing career was over, Niesha returned to Georgia Tech to complete her degree. She founded her first tech company Sports DataBase Network in 2010. She went on to found the non profit organization Ballin Technologies where she teaches disadvantaged students coding, and prepares them for careers in STEM through a love of sports. She is currently working for Scrap-Sports.
