= Yul Vazquez =

Cuban actor (born 1965)

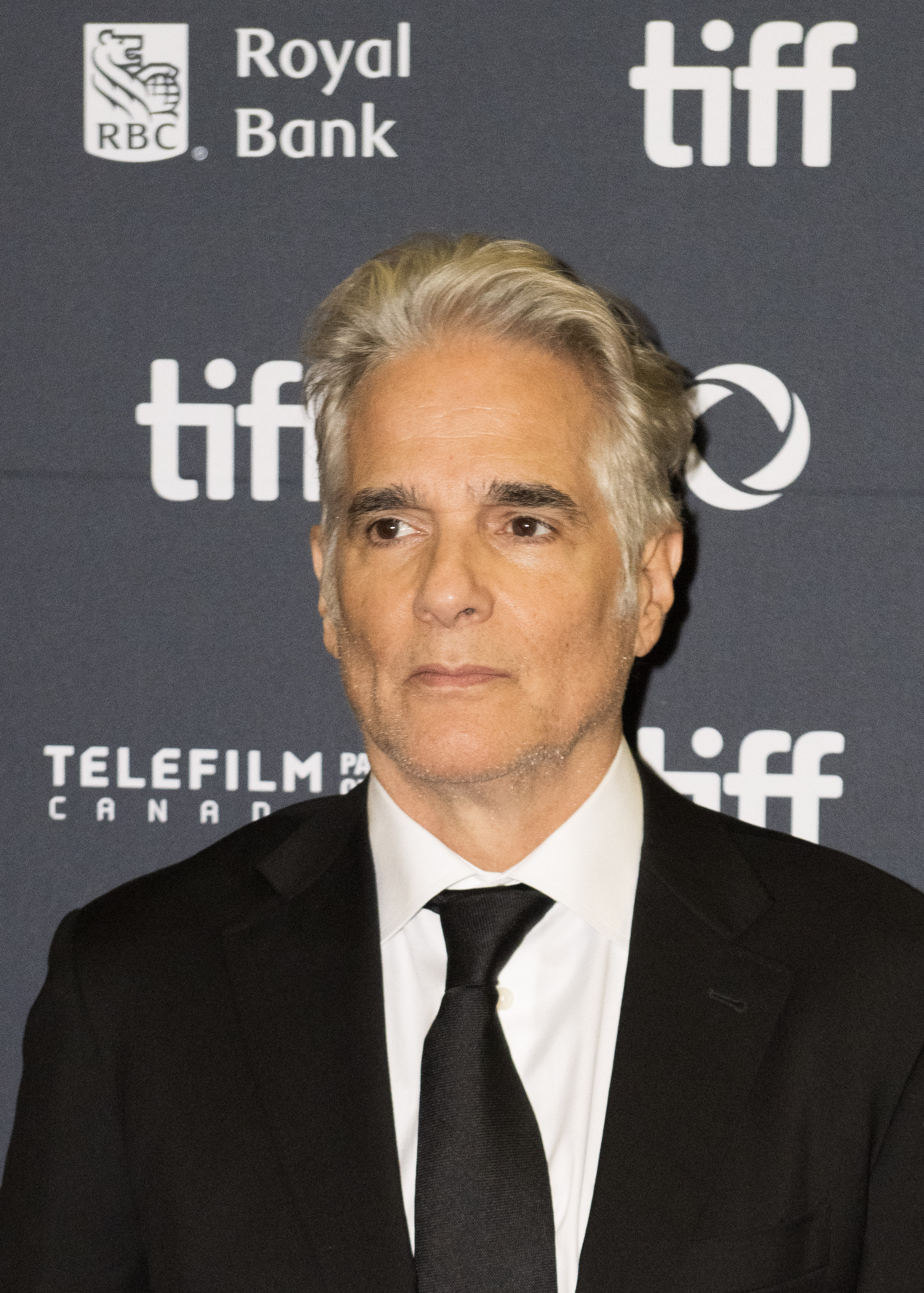
- Vázquez in 2025
- Born: 18 March 1965 (age 61); Cuba
- Occupations: Actor; musician
- Years active: 1981–present
- Spouse: Linda Larkin (m. 2002)

Yul Vazquez (born 18 March 1965) is a Cuban and American actor and musician. He has appeared in Runaway Bride (1999), Bad Boys II (2003), War of the Worlds (2005), American Gangster (2007), The A-Team (2010), Captain Phillips (2013), The Infiltrator (2016), Midnight, Texas (2017–2018), Russian Doll (2019), Severance (2022–2025), Hotel Cocaine (2024) and The Lost Bus (2025). Vazquez used to be the lead guitarist for melodic rock bands Urgent and Diving for Pearls.

== Early life ==
Vazquez was born in Cuba on 18 March 1965 and came to the United States with his family in 1971. He was named after Russian actor Yul Brynner. He grew up in Miami in a studio apartment with his mother, grandmother and older sister, being the youngest as well as the only boy in the household. His mother encouraged him in the arts, often taking him to the theater where she worked, and she bought him his first drum set and camera.

== Acting career ==
Vazquez started his acting career with filler parts in his mother's plays, which led to discovery by an agent who encouraged him to go to acting school. In the 1980s, he was lead guitarist for two Billboard-charted rock bands. His musical skills led him to land the part of Flaco in the 1992 film The Mambo Kings.

Vazquez went on to numerous film and television projects. With over 40 film credits, other highlights include roles in Runaway Bride (1999), Traffic (2000), Bad Boys II (2003), War of the Worlds (2005), The Take (2007), American Gangster (2007), Music Within (2007), Steven Soderbergh’s two-part epic Che (2008), The A-Team (2010) with Liam Neeson, John Sayles's Amigo (2010), and six time Oscar nominee Captain Phillips (2013). He has also been in Kill the Messenger (2014) starring Jeremy Renner and directed by Michael Cuesta; The Cobbler (2014) opposite Adam Sandler, Dustin Hoffman and Steve Buscemi; and Anesthesia (2015).

In television, he has had many guest and recurring roles. In the TV sitcom Seinfeld Vazquez played the role of Bob who stole the armoire from Kramer. In Lifetime's series The Lottery he starred as President Thomas Westwood and as The Reverend Emilio Sheehan in the NBC series Midnight, Texas. He was a regular for both seasons of the Starz drama Magic City, where he portrayed Victor Lazaro, general manager of the Miramar Playa. Additionally, he has recurred in other television series, as Pedro in FX's Louie, as Christian in CBS's The Good Wife and as Det. Anthony Nikolich on the HBO television series Treme. In the streaming world, he has had recurring roles in several hit shows including Netflix's Russian Doll and Apple TV+'s Severance.

Vazquez is a founding member of the LAByrinth Theater Company and served two terms as co-artistic director with Stephen Adly Guirgis and Mimi O'Donnell in New York City. Vazquez starred on Broadway in the Tony nominated The Motherfucker with the Hat opposite Chris Rock. For his portrayal of the eccentric Cousin Julio, he received nominations for a Drama Desk Award, an Outer Critics Circle Award and a Tony Award for Best Featured Actor in a Play. Additional theater credits include The Last Days of Judas Iscariot (The Public Theater) opposite Sam Rockwell, directed by Philip Seymour Hoffman, Terrence McNally's Stendhal Syndrome, Primary Stages with Isabella Rossellini and Richard Thomas, and The Floating Island Plays (Mark Taper Forum).

== Music career ==
Prior to starting his acting career, Vazquez was the lead guitar player for East Coast Album-oriented rock (AOR) bands Urgent and Diving for Pearls. Urgent landed a minor hit with their single "Running Back" which reached #79 on the Billboard Hot 100. A second single from their Cast The First Stone debut album, "Love Can Make You Cry", was re-recorded for the Iron Eagle soundtrack. Urgent broke up in 1987 after the lackluster success of their sophomore album, Thinking Out Loud.

Following the demise of Urgent, Vazquez joined Diving for Pearls, whose eponymous debut album was issued by Epic/Sony Music in 1989. The group was dropped by the label before a second album could be completed due to the musical climate changing in the early 1990s as melodic hard rock fell out of favor in the U.S.

In 2009, Vazquez played acoustic guitar with Ian Astbury of The Cult under the name The Soft Revolt appearing at the Bowery Electric in New York City on the opening night of John Patrick Shanley's play Savage in Limbo, which Astbury was producing. They performed songs by The Cult and Astbury solo material as well as covers by the Rolling Stones, Black Sabbath, Radiohead, among others.

In the 2022 show Severance, Vazquez sings and plays a cover of Metallica's "Enter Sandman" in the fourth episode.

== Personal life ==
Vazquez has been married to actress Linda Larkin (voice of Princess Jasmine) since 18 May 2002.

== Filmography ==
=== Film ===
| Year | Title | Role | Notes |
|---|---|---|---|
| 1992 | The Mambo Kings | Flaco | |
| 1992 | Friday Night Saturday Morning | Albie | Short |
| 1992 | Fly by Night | Sam | |
| 1993 | Night Owl | Tomas | |
| 1994 | Fresh | Chillie | |
| 1994 | Somebody to Love | Waiter | |
| 1995 | Nick of Time | Gustino | |
| 1996 | The Last Big Thing | 1st Interviewer | |
| 1998 | A Day Without a Mexican | Restaurateur | Short |
| 1999 | Man of the Century | Brooding Artist | |
| 1999 | Runaway Bride | Dead Head Gill Chavez | |
| 2000 | Drowning Mona | French Instructor | |
| 2000 | Traffic | Tigrillo/Obregon Assassin | |
| 2002 | Asterix & Obelix: Mission Cleopatra | Edifis (voice) | |
| 2002 | Running Time | The Hunter | Short |
| 2002 | The Adventures of Tom Thumb & Thumbelina | Gibson Mouse (voice) | Video |
| 2003 | Bad Boys II | Detective Mateo Reyes | |
| 2004 | The Stendhal Syndrome | Leo | Video |
| 2005 | The F Word | Luis | |
| 2005 | War of the Worlds | Julio | |
| 2006 | Things That Hang from Trees | Juan Lopez | |
| 2006 | The Ex | Paco | |
| 2007 | Music Within | Mike Stoltz | |
| 2007 | Southern Gothic | Hazel Fortune | |
| 2007 | The Take | Marco Ruiz | |
| 2007 | Jesus Cooks Me Breakfast | Young Man Jesus | Short |
| 2007 | Anamorph | Jorge "George" Ruiz | |
| 2007 | The Box | Finn Williams | |
| 2007 | American Gangster | Det. Alfonso Abruzzo | |
| 2008 | The Marconi Brothers | Sonny Venice | |
| 2008 | Che: Part One | Alejandro Ramirez | |
| 2008 | Che: Part Two | Alejandro Ramirez | |
| 2009 | The Missing Person | Don Edgar | |
| 2010 | Beware the Gonzo | Charlie Ronald | |
| 2010 | F—K | Yul | Short |
| 2010 | The A-Team | General Javier Tuco | |
| 2010 | Amigo | Padre Hidalgo | |
| 2010 | Little Fockers | Junior | |
| 2011 | Salvation Boulevard | Jorge Guzman De Vaca | |
| 2012 | Father/Son | Father | Short |
| 2013 | Blood Ties | Fabio DeSoto | |
| 2013 | Runner Runner | Delegate Herrera | |
| 2013 | Captain Phillips | Captain Frank Castellano | |
| 2014 | Take Care | Dr. Gotham Leonard | |
| 2014 | Rob the Mob | Vinny Gorgeous | |
| 2014 | Glass Chin | Roberto Flash | |
| 2014 | Time Out of Mind | Raoul | |
| 2014 | The Cobbler | Marsha | |
| 2014 | Kill the Messenger | Danilo Blandón | |
| 2014 | Fugly! | Ray | |
| 2015 | Anesthesia | Dr. Edward Barnes | |
| 2016 | The Phenom | Coach Eddie Soler | |
| 2016 | The Infiltrator | Javier Ospina | |
| 2016 | Beast or Raven | Man | Short |
| 2016 | True Memoirs of an International Assassin | General Javier Ruiz | |
| 2017 | Crown Heights | Commissioner Rafello | |
| 2017 | 1 Mile to You | Mr. Sickle | |
| 2017 | Last Flag Flying | Col. Willits | |
| 2017 | The Super | Julio | |
| 2018 | Gringo | Angel Valverde | |
| 2018 | O.G. | Baxter | |
| 2018 | Some Bad News | Dr. Richard Cranium | Short |
| 2020 | Books of Blood | Bennett | |
| 2025 | Tin Soldier | Lawrence Kollock | |
| 2025 | The Lost Bus | Ray Martinez | |
| 2026 | Run Amok | Uncle Dan | |
| 2026 | Imposters | Chief Ezra Reid | |
| 2026 | Diamond | The Butler | |
| TBA | 1972 | | Post-production |

=== Television ===
| Year | Title | Role | Notes |
|---|---|---|---|
| 1992 | Tales from the Crypt | Danny Darwin | Episode: "On a Deadman's Chest" |
| 1992 | ScreenPlay | Luis Salinas | Episode: "Bitter Harvest" |
| 1992 | Law & Order | Eddie Vasquez | Episode: "Skin Deep" |
| 1993 | The Untouchables | - | Episode: "Cuba: Part 1 & 2" |
| 1993 | Strapped | Latisha's Attorney | TV movie |
| 1994 | Walker, Texas Ranger | Emilio Durazo | Episode: "On Deadly Ground" |
| 1994 | Coach | Alberto Roca | Episode: "Head Like a Wheel" |
| 1995 | The Watcher | - | Episode: "Reversal of Fortune" |
| 1995 | The Price of Love | Rafael | TV movie |
| 1995–98 | Seinfeld | Bob | Recurring cast (season 7), guest (season 9) |
| 1996 | Jake's Women | Luigi | TV movie |
| 1996 | High Tide | - | Episode: "Code Name: Scorpion" |
| 1996 | Touched by an Angel | Tony Portino | Episode: "Groundrush" |
| 1997 | Temporarily Yours | Luis | Episode: "The Voice of Reason" |
| 1998 | Trinity | Mr. Cupideros | Episode: "In Loco Parentis" |
| 1999 | Mondo Picasso | Mondo | Regular cast |
| 2000–02 | Courage the Cowardly Dog | Additional voices (voice) | Main cast (season 2-3) |
| 2001 | Law & Order | Attorney from DA's Office | Episode: "Sunday in the Park with Jorge" |
| 2001 | Big Apple | Officer Cruz | Recurring cast |
| 2001 | Sex and the City | Phil | Episode: "The Agony and the Ex-tacy" |
| 2002 | The Sopranos | Reuben 'The Cuban' | Episode: "Christopher" |
| 2003 | Keen Eddie | Jonah Rosenthal | Episode: "Pilot: Eddie" |
| 2008 | Fringe | George Morales | Episode: "The Dreamscape" |
| 2010 | Law & Order: Special Victims Unit | Daniel Hardy | Episode: "Confidential" |
| 2010 | Lies in Plain Sight | Rafael Reyes | TV movie |
| 2011–12 | Louie | Pedro | Guest cast (season 1-2) |
| 2012–13 | The Good Wife | Cristian Romano | Recurring cast (season 4) |
| 2012–13 | Magic City | Victor Lazaro | Recurring cast |
| 2012–13 | Treme | Detective Anthony Nikolich | Recurring cast (season 3), guest (season 4) |
| 2013 | Law & Order: Special Victims Unit | Luis Montero | Episode: "Poisoned Motive" |
| 2014 | Person of Interest | Cyrus Wells | Episode: "Root Path" |
| 2014 | The Lottery | President Thomas Westwood | Main cast |
| 2016 | Elementary | Arthur Tetch | Episode: "Turn It Upside Down" |
| 2016–17 | Bloodline | White Shirt Man | Recurring cast (season 2-3) |
| 2016–18 | Divorce | Craig Anders | Recurring cast (season 1-2) |
| 2017 | Madam Secretary | Ted Fitzgerald | Episode: "Off the Record" |
| 2017–18 | Midnight, Texas | Reverend Emilio Sheehan | Main cast (season 1), guest (season 2) |
| 2018 | The Looming Tower | Jason Sanchez | Recurring cast |
| 2018 | FBI | Bryce Miller | Episode: "Doomsday" |
| 2018 | Narcos: Mexico | John Gavin | Recurring cast (season 1) |
| 2018 | SEAL Team | Andres Doza | Recurring cast (season 2) |
| 2019 | Russian Doll | John Reyes | Main cast (season 1) |
| 2019 | I Am the Night | Billis | Recurring cast |
| 2020 | The Outsider | Yunis Sablo | Main cast |
| 2021 | Succession | Rick Salgado | Episode: "What It Takes" |
| 2022 | Promised Land | Father Ramos | Recurring cast |
| 2022–25 | Severance | Peter "Petey" Kilmer | Recurring cast (season 1), guest (season 2) |
| 2023 | Godfather of Harlem | José Miguel Battle Sr. | Recurring cast (season 3) |
| 2023 | White House Plumbers | Bernard Barker | Main cast |
| 2024 | Parish | Hector | Episode: "A Good Man" |
| 2024 | Hotel Cocaine | Nestor Cabal | Main cast |
| 2025 | The American Revolution | Henry Knox / José de Gálvez (voice) | 3 episodes |
| 2025–26 | Will Trent | Sheriff Caleb Roussard | Recurring cast (seasons 3 and 4) |
| 2026 | Liam and Michael Presents: Cohan and Danny | The Contact | 1 Episode |
| 2026 | The Terminal List | Vic Rodriguez | Recurring Cast (Season 2) |

=== Video games ===
| Year | Title | Role |
|---|---|---|
| 2006 | Grand Theft Auto: Vice City Stories | Armando Mendez |
| 2009 | Grand Theft Auto: The Ballad of Gay Tony | The People of Liberty City |

=== Audio ===
| Year | Title | Role | Notes | Ref(s) |
|---|---|---|---|---|
| 2023 | White House Plumbers Podcast | Himself | Episode 3 | |

== Discography ==
- Urgent – Cast the First Stone (EMI-Manhattan, 1985)
- Various – Iron Eagle OST (Capitol, 1986)
- Urgent – Thinking Out Loud (EMI-Manhattan, 1987)
- Diving for Pearls – Diving for Pearls (Epic/Sony, 1989)
- Diving for Pearls – Texas (2006)
