= Buschel =

Buschel is a surname. Notable people with the surname include:

- Noah Buschel (born 1978), American film director and screenwriter
