= Enid Zentelis =

American writer, filmmaker and podcaster

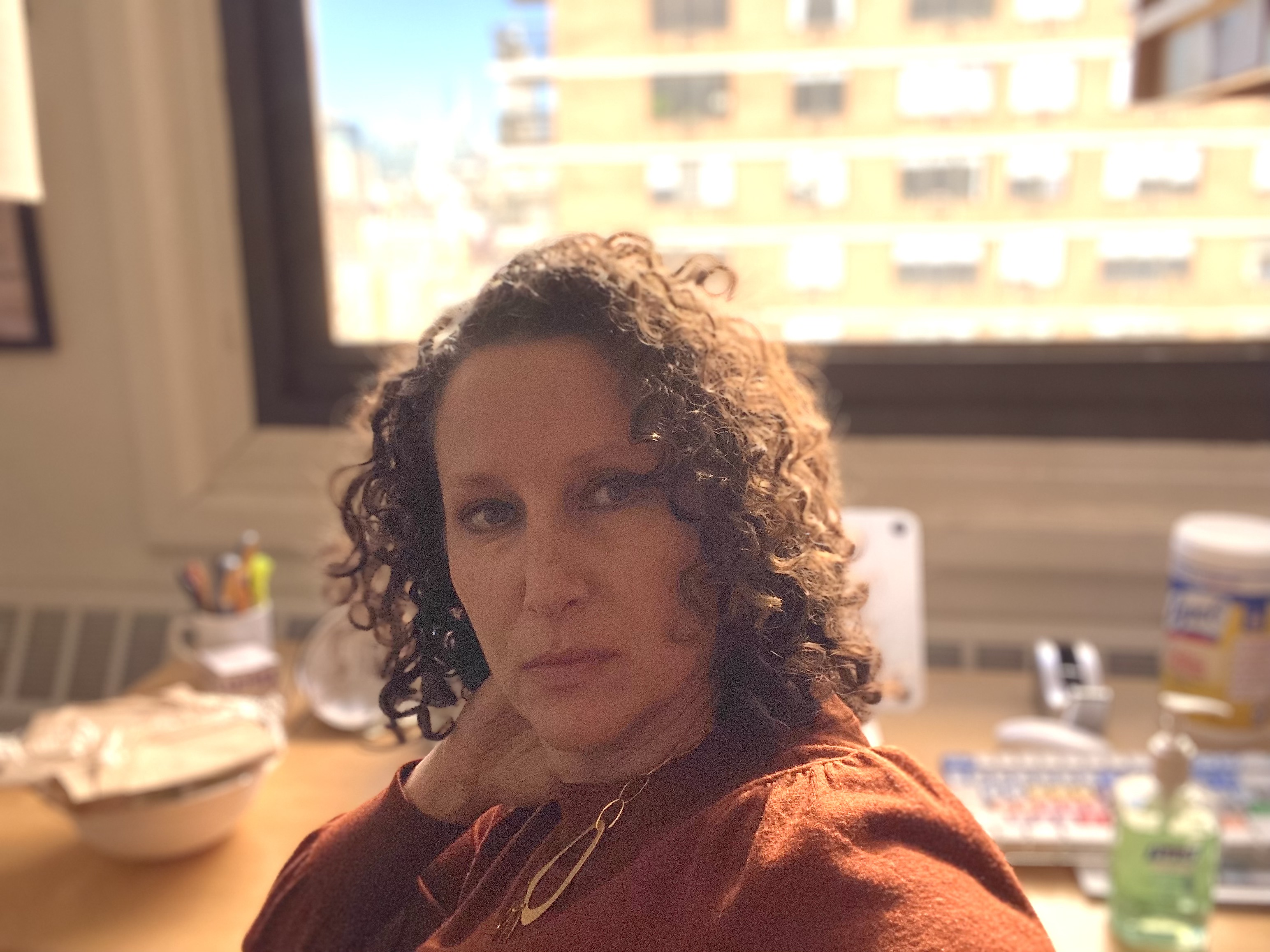
- Born: Los Angeles, California, U.S.
- Occupations: Filmmaker, writer, podcaster
- Years active: 1997–present
- Spouse: Sean Fogarty

Enid Zentelis is an American writer, filmmaker, and podcaster. She is best known for directing features Evergreen and Bottled Up and for her podcast, How My Grandmother Won WWII.

== Life and career ==
Zentelis was born in Los Angeles, California. She is a first generation American, born to a Hungarian-Jewish mother and Latvian father. She is a graduate of Hampshire College and the Graduate Film Program at NYU, where she was taught by Spike Lee, Martin Scorsese and mentored by Mary Harron. Her essays and literary nonfiction have appeared in the Daily Beast, The FemWord, and Talkhouse. She is a professor of filmmaking at the New York University Tisch School of the Arts.

Zentelis's major works include, Evergreen, premiered in Dramatic Competition at Sundance Film Festival in 2004. In 2013, she directed Bottled Up, starring Melissa Leo, Marin Ireland and Josh Hamilton. In 2021, she created the podcast, How My Grandmother Won WWII, about the discovery that her grandmother worked with British Special Ops during the Holocaust. In 2022, she sold her podcast to Kinetic Content with a scripted series development deal.

== Filmography ==
Year	Title	Director	Writer	Producer	Note
2017	Au Pair	✓	✓		Short film
2013	Bottled Up	✓	✓	✓	Feature Film
2007	The Man with My Nose	✓	✓		Short film
2004	Evergreen	✓	✓	✓	Feature Film
1997	Dog Race	✓			Short film
1996	Sounds of Morning	✓	✓		Short film
1993	Granny Was an 0utlaw	✓	✓	✓	Documentary

== Publications ==
- 2022 – Everybody Gets Killed

== Awards and nominations ==
Year	Result	Award	Category	Work	Ref.
2020	Nominated	IFP Gotham	Audio Hub	How My Grandmother Won WWII	
2017	Nominated	Bentonville Film Festival	Best Episodic Pilot	Au Pair	
2013	Nominated	Tribeca Festival	Nora Ephron Prize	Bottled Up	
2004	Nominated	Sundance Film Festival	Best Dramatic	Evergreen	
2004	Won	Sonoma International Film Festival	Best First-Time Director	Evergreen	
1997	Nominated	Torino Film Festival	Best Short Film	Dog Race	
1997	Won	New York Film Festival	Best Student Short	Dog Race	
