= The Phenom =

The Phenom could refer to

- The Phenom (film), a 2016 sports drama film starring Ethan Hawke
- The Undertaker, a professional wrestler with World Wrestling Entertainment
- Vitor Belfort, a Brazilian mixed martial arts fighter
- Kiefer Ravena, a Filipino basketball player
