= Now is Not the Time to Panic =

2022 novel by Kevin Wilson

- Author: Kevin Wilson
- Language: English
- Genre: Novel
- Publisher: Ecco Press
- Publication date: November 8, 2022
- Publication place: United States
- Media type: Print (hardback and paperback)
- Pages: 256
- ISBN: 9780062913500

Now is Not the Time to Panic is a novel written by Kevin Wilson and published by Ecco Press in 2022.

The novel is told from the point of view of Frances Eleanor Budge, as she gets a call from a journalist who found out she might be responsible for a mysterious and unsigned poster that caused a panic in Coalfield, Tennessee, in 1996. Frances then remembers the summer of 1996, when 16-year-old Frankie Budge created that poster with a young talented artist called Zeke, who was also her first boyfriend. The book details the effect that summer, and poster, had on Frankie's life, and she carried its effects with her into her adult life, as a semi-famous author, wife, and mother.

Wilson writes about teenagers in rural Tennessee in the 1990s, drawing on his own experiences growing up in rural Tennessee, in a sort of cultural wilderness, without the Internet and phones connecting you to a wider world of culture. A central part of the novel is a line, which the protagonist makes up and puts on a poster. A version of the line was created by Wilson's friend in 1997, and he was greatly affected by it. Characters in the novel are similarly affected by this line. The line does not have a specific meaning by itself.

== Plot ==
Frances Eleanor Budge is at home with her daughter when she gets a call from a journalist, Mazzy Brower. Mazzy asks Frances if she wrote those words decades ago, and after some trepidation Frances admits she did.

The novel then sends us back to the Summer of 1996, in Coalfield, a small town in eastern Tennessee. Frankie, 16, lives with her mother and three older brothers, 18-year-old triplets. She meets Zeke, a shy, awkward teen like herself. At first, they spend time just to have something to do, but then they bond. Frances's father left them to marry someone else and raise a new daughter, whom he also named Frances, and Zeke's mother left his father after he cheated on her with multiple women. Both Frances and Zeke feel disillusioned, lost, adrift. They also bond over both being artists: Frances is a writer and Zeke draws. Zeke pushes Frances to create with him, in sort of a naive artists' colony, and wishes to create art that would affect the world. It is a plot point in the novel that many people wonder where the line is from, believing it to be a quote from a poem, a song, a play, or the Bible. But Frances made it up. Zeke then draws an illustration to accompany the line, and the two make a blood pact and dribble drops of blood on the poster. Then they photocopy it on an old photocopy machine Frances' brothers stole and hid in the garage. Zeke and Frankie go around town and hang the posters in various places, hide it in books, put it in people's mailboxes, cars, etc. The poster, the acts of creating in secret and then spreading it around, greatly effect Frankie, giving her a sense of control, power, and creative freedom.

The posters draw minimal attention at first, some people believing it might be a commercial for a band, until a young couple lies and say they were kidnapped and forced to do drugs by the "fugitives" responsible for the poster. This creates a panic in Coalfield, and draws more attention to the poster. The text and drawing affect other youths, who copy and remix the poster, hanging photocopies of it, or images like it, in Coalfield and then in other cities in the US and eventually other countries around the world. The image is also adopted by t-shirt makers, other artists, etc. In coalfield, the panic results in several tragic deaths. While Frankie wishes to continue with the act of photocopying and hanging the poster, Zeke is distraught. He suffers an episode and pushes Frankie, which causes her to break her arm and lose some of her teeth. In order to disguise the true cause of her severe wounds, Frankie intentionally crashes her car into her neighbor, Randolph Avery, an ailing artist's tree. When Avery comes to help her, he discovers her secret - that she created the poster.

In the intervening years, the poster stays present, the enigmatic line and the evocative drawing becoming a cultural meme, often copied and used. We learn that Frances kept the original poster, and keeps making photocopies and hanging it around the world, in every city she comes to. She also recites the line to herself very often, to calm herself and give herself power.

In the present, Frances meets Mazzy Brower and learns that Avery corresponded with a minor artist, and told his friend her secret. Mazzy happened to find those letters, and that's how she learned the secret.

Frances understands her secret is about to come out. She tells her husband her secret, and then travels back to Coalfield to tell her mother. We find out Frances' mother always knew Frankie made the poster, and just did not say anything because she thought Frankie wanted it to stay a secret. She then tracks down Zeke, who lives in Memphis with his parents, who it turns out stayed married. He has Bipolar disorder and living with his parents helps him. He also feels terribly guilty about hurting Frankie, and tries to repress memories of that summer. The two bond over how that summer shaped them and helped create who they are now. Zeke asks Frances to lie to the journalist and say she drew the illustration herself, since he doesn't want to reveal his part in creating the poster. She agrees. The two reconcile, and hope to reconnect after the article comes out.

The novel ends on a positive note, since Frances believes coming out with the story would be for the best.

== Reviews ==
The novel received mixed reviews. Some called it "another tender, moving novel by an author who understands how truly bizarre ordinary life is" and incredible, captivating, and unique.

Sloane Crosley in The New York Times did not enjoy it as much, writing that "strings of dialogue, more predictable than verisimilar, are linked with episodes of brief action that could have been dropped into" a movie about teenagers. "Here is a charming story with enough pockets of pathos to keep the novel from feeling weightless. The only issue is that it seems to want more for itself. A lot more. And it becomes increasingly vocal about asking for it." The grand themes of the novel feel flat and repetitive, and the conflict is contrived. "It comes off as manufactured drama."
