= The Family Fang =

2011 novel by Kevin Wilson

- First edition
- Author: Kevin Wilson
- Language: English
- Genre: Novel
- Publisher: Ecco Press
- Publication date: August 9, 2011
- Publication place: United States
- Media type: Print (hardback & paperback)
- Pages: 320
- ISBN: 9780061579059

The Family Fang is a bestselling novel written by Kevin Wilson and published by Ecco in 2011.

== Plot ==
Annie and Buster Fang are the children of famous performance artists who, in the late ’80s and early ’90s, perform public interactive pieces with audiences who are unaware that they are performers and whose acts typically involve their children, whom they film and credit as child A (Annie) and child B (Buster).

Annie grows up to be a highly successful actress who has been nominated for an Academy Award while Buster becomes a mediocre novelist who must supplement his work with freelance journalism. However, after being told by the director of her latest movie to appear nude in a scene, Annie begins to experience a nervous breakdown, appearing unstable to the media. Meanwhile, whilst on assignment in Nebraska covering a pair of war veterans who build spud guns, Buster is shot in the face and hospitalized. With limited funds and mounting medical debt he returns to his parents' home.

After being dumped by her publicist, Annie learns that her ex-boyfriend, who is a screenwriter, has been hired to write Annie out of the third installment of the franchise that made her a star. She consents to go with him on a trip to Wyoming. However, after he threatens to destroy her, she runs away from him at the airport and goes to see Buster. Immediately, Caleb and Camille, Annie and Buster's parents, attempt to force them to participate in one of their performance art pieces which involves handing out free coupons for chicken sandwiches and then watching as the crowd goes mad after the sandwiches are denied to them. Nonetheless, the stunt goes terribly wrong when Annie and Buster refuse to participate. Camille and Caleb are unable to hand out more than a few coupons and the people at the sandwich shop mistakenly believe that the coupons are valid and hand out sandwiches.

For a while Annie and Buster stay in their parents house feeling aimless. Annie discovers nearly a hundred paintings in her closet which her mother claims as her own, saying that she was a painter before she was a conceptual artist and had been slowly returning to that medium. She gives a painting each to Annie and Buster.

Buster receives a phone call from a local creative writing professor and, with Annie's support, speaks coherently to the creative writing class. After the class he is handed a stack of short stories by the professor and immediately connects to one written by a woman named Suzanne Crosby who he gives his number to in the hopes she will contact him with more of her work. Upon returning home he and Annie discover a note by their parents informing them they have gone to North Carolina. Freed from their parents, Annie and Buster go about dealing with their issues, including Buster's medical debt, which Annie decides to pay, and Annie's alcoholism, which Buster says she must wean herself off of. They later receive a call from a police officer claiming their parents are missing and possibly dead. Annie immediately believes this is part of a performance art piece while Buster suspects it is real. Annie resolves to go looking for her parents in order to prove they are still alive.

Annie and Buster go to visit Caleb's mentor Hobart Waxman. Hobart agrees with Annie that the Fangs are likely alive but tells them they have been given a gift and they should continue their lives without their parents. Annie refuses to accept this. Annie and Buster decide that the best way to lure their parents out of hiding is to put on an exhibition of Camille's portraits. However, the exhibition is a failure. Camille and Caleb do not appear and Annie and Buster decide to accept the fact that their parents are dead. They slowly begin to put their lives back together. Buster begins working on a novel and decides to move in with Suzanne while Annie accepts a role from the writer/director who directed her to an Academy Award nomination, Lucy Wayne. Before the siblings can fully move on with their lives, Suzanne gives Buster a heavy metal CD made by twin prodigies. Buster and Annie recognize the lyrics to their song Kill All Parents as a song their parents forced them to perform as children for a piece that was not recorded and therefore unavailable to the public. Pretending to be a music journalist, Buster contacts the twins for an interview and is able to get them to admit that the song was written by their father. The twins' mother then goes on the phone and asks them to leave their father alone.

Annie and Buster travel to North Dakota where they find their father living under the name Jim Baltz. He contacts their mother, who is living under the name Patricia Howlett and the four Fangs meet in the food court of an abandoned mall. Caleb admits that the two began to plan their disappearance approximately ten years earlier when Annie left home to become an actress. They plan to reveal themselves as living after they are legally declared dead in 7 years. Annie agrees not to blow their cover in exchange for never seeing them again. The parents readily agree and the Fangs part.

Ultimately Annie finds creative success on the set of Lucy's new movie and contemplates starting a romantic relationship with her. She realizes that Buster has surpassed her in managing to achieve peace and contentment and hopes to find the same.

== Accomplishments ==
- New York Times Bestseller
- Time's Top Ten Fiction Books of 2011
- Esquire's Top Ten Books of 2011
- People's Top Ten Books of 2011
- Kirkus Reviews's Best Fiction of 2011
- Booklist's Top 10 First Novels of 2011
- Amazon.com list it in their Best Books of 2011 list.
- Barnes & Noble list it in their Best Books of 2011, Adult Fiction section.

== Reception ==
- Publishers Weekly called it a "bizarre, mirthful debut novel"
- NPR books stated, "It's such a minty fresh delight to open up Kevin Wilson's debut novel, The Family Fang, and feel the revitalizing blast of original thought, robust invention, screwball giddiness."
- The Wall Street Journal called it "inventive and hilarious"

== Film adaptation ==
The film rights were bought by actress Nicole Kidman's Blossom Films company. In November 2013, it was announced that actor Jason Bateman will direct and star alongside Kidman in a film adaptation. It was released in April, 2016 by Starz Digital.
