= Diving for Pearls =

Defunct American melodic rock band

- Origin: New York City, United States
- Genre: Rock
- Years active: 1984–1990; 2002–2006
- Labels: Epic; Atenzia
- Spinoff of: The Trademarks
- Past members: Danny Malone; Yul Vazquez; Jack Moran; David Weeks; Peter Clemente

Diving for Pearls was an American melodic rock band founded in 1984 whose self-titled debut album was released in 1989. A follow-up album, Texas, was issued in 2006 without much fanfare. The band takes its name from a line found in the 1983 Elvis Costello song, "Shipbuilding." Their song "Gimme Your Good Lovin" peaked at No. 84 on the Billboard Hot 100.

== History ==
=== Original lineup (1984–1990) ===
Diving For Pearls originated in Boston, Massachusetts, and was formed by Danny Malone (lead vocals, guitar) and Jack Moran (keyboards), both former members of local act The Trademarks. After slugging it out on the Boston scene for a couple of years, Malone and Moran moved to New York City where they were eventually joined by Yul Vazquez (guitar, vocals), formerly with Urgent, and Peter Clemente (drums), who had played with the Michael Monroe fronted New York act, Secret Chiefs, and appeared on Monroe's 1987 debut solo album, Nights Are So Long. Vazquez and Clemente had also both been part of Jean Beauvoir's Drums Along the Mohawk touring band. Los Angeles native David Weeks (bass) completed the Diving for Pearls line-up.

The band's big breakthrough came when Epic Records A&R man Michael Kaplan came out to a New York gig in 1988 and convinced Epic to sign the band to a $20,000 development deal. Kaplan subsequently introduced the members to up-and-coming producer David Prater, who cut half a dozen songs with the group. Not fully convinced yet, Epic head of A&R, Don Grierson, allotted some extra money to record another half dozen songs under the guidance of Prater. One of the new tracks was "New Moon," and according to Malone, it was this particular track that convinced Grierson to sign the group.

Diving For Pearls eponymous debut was recorded from April 14 to June 10, 1989, at the Eleven-Eleven Sound Studios in Nashville, Tennessee with Prater at the helm. The album's release in October 1989 was preceded by the release of the first single and MTV video, "Gimme Your Good Lovin'", which peaked at No. 84 on the Billboard Hot 100. The record went on to sell over 250,000 copies in the U.S. alone and was named as one of Kerrang! 's Top 20 for 1989. A second album was in the works but was never completed as the band was dropped by the label due to the changing musical climate.

Diving For Pearls was remastered and re-issued by English label Rock Candy in 2006, including five bonus tracks, a studio demo of The Beatles' "Dear Prudence," and four live cuts recorded at the Toy Tiger club in Louisville, Kentucky in 1990, including a cover of The Cult's"She Sells Sanctuary".

Danny Malone moved on to join Band Of Angels, led by Elliot Easton of The Cars, whose Roy Thomas Baker produced album for Atlantic Records was shelved and remains unreleased. However, five songs from the Band of Angeles sessions with Malone on lead vocals surfaced as bonus tracks on the 1996 re-issue of Easton's solo album Change No Change, originally released in 1985. Malone also teamed up with former Styx member Glen Burtnik, in a short lived band called Dunaways that played a half dozen shows at New York's CBGBs before calling it quits.

=== Band resurrection (2002–2006) ===
In 2002, Malone resurrected Diving For Pearls and secured a recording contract with Swedish label Atenzia Records. A new album, Texas, eventually surfaced in 2005. It was the band's first release in 17 years. The band now consisted of Malone as the only original member, along with contributions from returning producer David Prater. Though the CD was well written and performed, it received little fanfare. As of 2008, Malone was studying for his art major in his hometown of Boston.

=== Post-breakup activities ===
Since the demise of Diving For Pearls in the early 1990s, guitarist Yul Vazquez has gone on to a successful TV and movie acting career, starting in 1992 with a role in the movie The Mambo Kings. Between 1995 and 1998, he appeared in several episodes of Seinfeld as Bob, The Intimidating Gay Guy. Vazquez was nominated for a 2011 Tony Award for "Best Featured Actor in a Play" for his role of Cousin Julio in The Motherfucker With the Hat. In 2009, Vazquez played acoustic guitar with Ian Astbury of The Cult under the name The Soft Revolt, appearing at The Bowery Electric in New York City on the opening night of John Patrick Shanley's play Savage in Limbo, which Astbury was producing. They performed songs by The Cult and Astbury solo material as well as covers by the Rolling Stones and Radiohead, among others.

Peter Clemente later became vice president and director of online entertainment practice at Internet customer relationship management firm Cyber Dialogue. Early in his career, he had been a member of The Mundanes, a new wave band based in Providence, Rhode Island, whose 1982 demo was produced by Mick Ronson.

Former bassist David Weeks made the headlines in 2002, as a lawyer representing Pamela Anderson and Tommy Lee, in their infamous sex video lawsuit against Seattle-based Internet Entertainment Group. He is head of his own law firm based in Westlake Village, California.

== Discography ==
=== Diving For Pearls (1989) ===
All songs written by D. Malone & J. Moran except where noted.

1. "Gimme Your Good Lovin'" - 4:16
2. "Have You Forgotten?" (D.Malone, J. Malone, D. Weeks) - 3:42
3. "I Close My Eyes" - 3:50
4. "New Moon" - 4:03
5. "Never on Monday" - 3:25
6. "You're All I Know" - 4:46
7. "Mystery to Me" - 4:02
8. "I Don't Want to Cry" (D.Malone, J. Moran, D. Amaral) - 4:03
9. "Keep Our Love Alive" - 3:28
10. "The Girl Can't Stop It" (D.Malone, J. Moran, Y. Vasquez) - 3:38

Rock Candy re-issue bonus tracks:

1. "Dear Prudence" (demo)
2. "I Close My Eyes" (live)
3. "Gimme Your Good Lovin" (live)
4. "The Girl Can't Stop It" (live)
5. "She Sells Sanctuary" (live)

=== Texas (2005) ===
1. "Thinking About Things That Will Never Be"
2. "I Thought About You"
3. "The Truth Is"
4. "If I Only Knew"
5. "Baby Come Down"
6. "The Colours Show"
7. "I Will Get over You"
8. "Broken Man"
9. "Heaven Only Knows"
10. "The Sweetest Sin"
11. "Lonely Is the Dark"
12. "Stop the World from Turning"
