= Rodrigo Lopresti =

American-Argentine actor, musician and film director

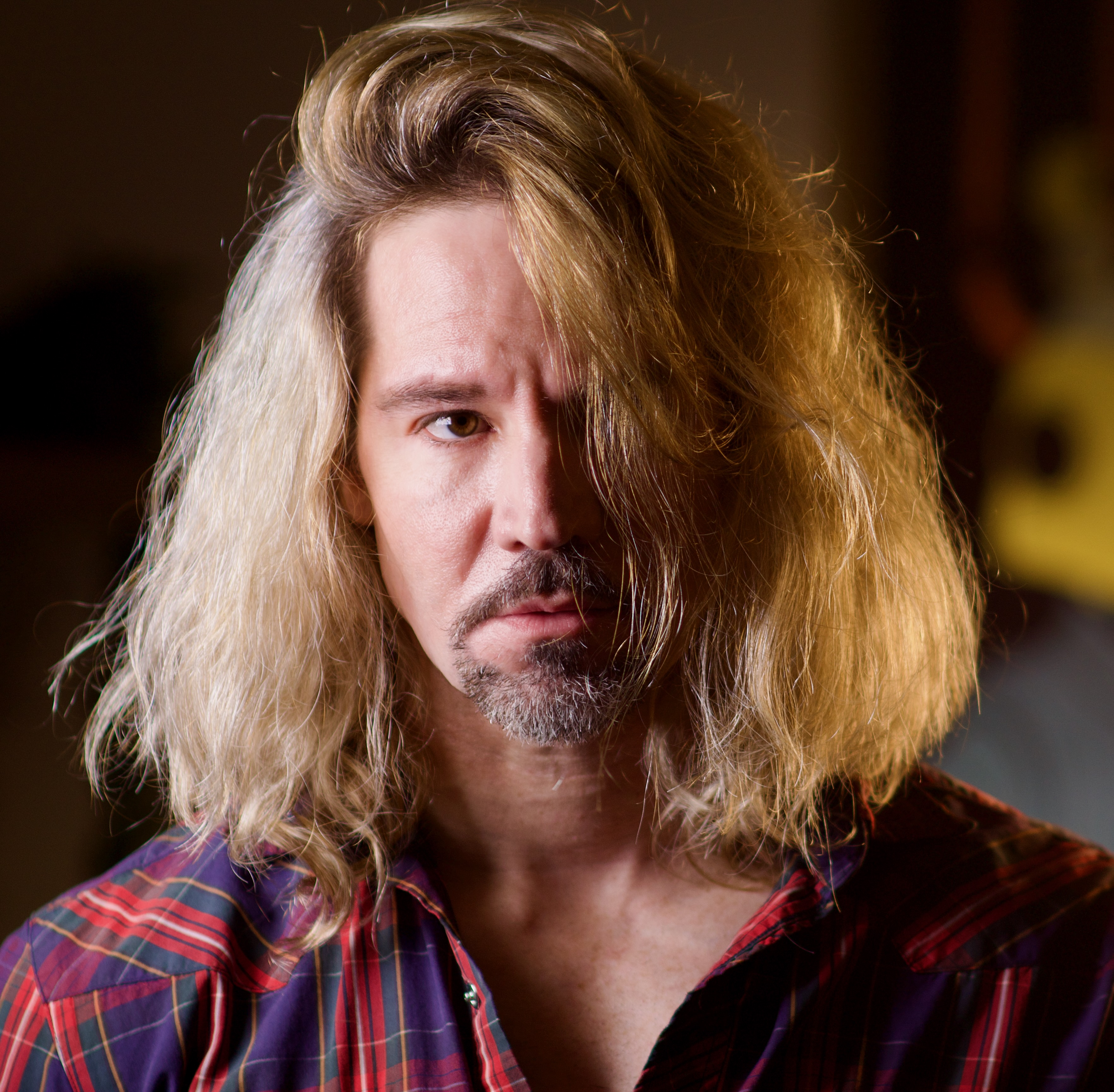
- Lopresti in 2026
- Born: September 6, 1976 (age 50); Buenos Aires, Argentina
- Other name: The Hermitt
- Occupations: Actor, musician, film director
- Website: http://www.rodrigolopresti.com

Rodrigo Lopresti (born September 6, 1976) is an American-Argentine actor, musician and film director who lives in Brooklyn, New York. He released songs as The Hermitt, with his first commercial album released in 2003.

== Biography ==
=== Personal life ===
Rodrigo Lopresti was born in Buenos Aires, Argentina, the youngest of two children. Lopresti grew up in Miami, Florida. He graduated Miami Beach Senior High in 1995. Lopresti became the singer and guitar player of a surf-punk band called Garlands Room in 1994. He released an album two years later under the name The Hermitt. He played most of the instruments in the 2003 release titled & The Story of the Insects. Lopresti is also a painter.

=== Career ===
Lopresti got his start with a small role in the movie Dark Voices (2001), and since has appeared in several TV shows, Web Shorts, and commercials. He's also appeared in several movies, including Delirious and The Imperialists Are Still Alive!. His band, The Hermitt and two songs he wrote were featured in the film Last Days. Lopresti won a 2006 Best Short Film Award at the Charlotte Film Festival for the film Lucia, which he directed and played the lead role. He also directed and starred in You're Gonna Feel Funny After, a short film written by Noah Buschel

In 2011 he co-wrote, co-directed and starred in i'm not me, his first feature as a director, which was selected as part of the IFP lab of 2010 and Wroclaw's Gotham In Progress 11 projects of 2011. He's also had roles in Bringing Rain, The Missing Person, and Neal Cassady.

In 2013, Lopresti starred in and produced Gregory Collins's drama A Song Still Inside, which screened at the Sarasota Film Festival and the Seattle International Film Festival.

In 2025, Lopresti served as cinematographer and editor on Alison Bartlett's short documentary A Vital Sun, which won the Environmental Impact Award at the 2025 Tribeca X Awards.

== The Hermitt ==
The Hermitt
- The Hermitt. L-R: Rodrigo Lopresti, Patrick Galligan, Kevin Brady

Background information
- Origin: Brooklyn, New York, U.S.
- Genres: rap, alternative hip hop, indie folk
- Label: Devious Semantics
- Members: Rodrigo Lopresti
- Past members: Kevin Brady; Patrick Galligan
- Website: www.myspace.com/thehermitt

Lopresti built a recording studio in a tiny windowless closet of a Brooklyn apartment he shared with Francis Benhamou. Lopresti recorded, arranged and mastered 14 songs into a Korg digital 8-track device. In 2003, "& The Story of The Insects" was born. He released the album under Devious Semantics, a record label he co-founded with Kevin Brady and Tyler Fenio.

Lopresti played most of the instruments on the album and designed the cover artwork. Ryan Donowho played drums on "& Calistos Curse." and Patrick Galligan on “I-Mold”, “A Pointless Ride”, “The Man Behind The Mask”, and “El Rostro Impenetrable”.

Gus Van Sant featured two songs, "Seen as None," and "Pointless Ride," on the soundtrack for his 2005 movie "Last Days." The Hermitt band, featuring Kevin Brady on bass and Patrick Galligan on drums, was the band playing at a bar in the Last Days movie.

The band has not performed live since 2008.

=== Discography ===
- The Alchis EP
- Sessions in Pagoda EP
- The Hermitt & the Story of the Insects LP

== Filmography ==
Year	Film	Role	Notes
2020	Holy New York	Hector	Feature Film
2019	FBI	Professor Will Kelly	Episode: "A New Dawn"
2018	Julian Got the Part	Julian	Short Film
2018	Castle Rock	Gaddis	Episode: "Past Perfect"
2017	The Ningyo	C. Marlowe	Short Film
2017	The Sinner	Gabe	Episode: "Part VII"
2016	4am Redmond And Meda	Redmond	Short Film
2016	Women Who Kill	Jackson	Feature Film
2016	Vinyl	Danny	Episode: "E.A.B."
2015	The Challenger	Cameraman	Feature Film
2015	Blindspot	Shawn Palmer	Episode: "Cede Your Soul "
2013	A Song Still Inside	Michael Hayes	Feature Film
2012	Blue Bloods	Keith Daley	Episode: "Mother's Day"
2011	I'm Not Me	Josh Morgan	Feature Film
2010	The Imperialists Are Still Alive!	Eagle	Feature Film
2009	You're Gonna Feel Funny After	Mike	Short Film
2009	The Missing Person	Carlos Clemente	Feature Film
2008	Last Call	Francisco	Feature Film
2007	Neal Cassady	Jim Maris	Feature Film
2006	The Night Listener	Young Man at Party	Feature Film
2006	Delirious	Demo	Feature Film
2006	Lucia	Andrew Lasky	Short Film
2005	Last Days	The Hermitt (Band in Club)	Feature Film
2003	Bringing Rain	Reb Babbitt	Feature Film
2001	Dark Voices	Diego	Feature Film
