= Tunneling to the Center of the Earth =

2009 story collection by Kevin Wilson

- Author: Kevin Wilson
- Language: English
- Genre: Short story collection
- Publisher: Ecco
- Publication date: March 25, 2009
- Pages: 224
- ISBN: 9780061579028 Paperback

Tunneling to the Center of the Earth is the debut short story collection of Kevin Wilson, published in April 2009 by Ecco/HarperCollins.

== Reviews ==
The New York Times states, "Wilson offers fabulous twists and somersaults of the imagination" and his work is "daring and often exquisitely tender."

== Awards ==
Awards for Tunneling to the Center of the Earth
Year	Award	Result	Ref.
2009	Shirley Jackson Award for Single-Author Collection	Winner	
2010	American Library Association's Alex Award	Selection	
