= The Family Fang (film) =

2015 American film by Jason Bateman

- Theatrical release poster
- Directed by: Jason Bateman
- Screenplay by: David Lindsay-Abaire
- Based on: The Family Fang by Kevin Wilson
- Produced by: Daniela Taplin Lundberg; Riva Marker; Nicole Kidman; Per Saari; Leslie Urdang; Dean Vanech; Jason Bateman; James Garavente
- Starring: Nicole Kidman; Jason Bateman; Christopher Walken; Maryann Plunkett; Jason Butler Harner; Kathryn Hahn
- Cinematography: Ken Seng
- Edited by: Robert Frazen
- Music by: Carter Burwell
- Production companies: Red Crown Productions; Olympus Pictures; Blossom Films; Aggregate Films; West Madison Entertainment; Minerva Productions; QED International
- Distributed by: Starz Digital
- Release dates: September 14, 2015 (TIFF); April 29, 2016 (United States)
- Running time: 105 minutes
- Country: United States
- Language: English
- Box office: $585,165

The Family Fang is a 2015 American comedy-drama film directed by Jason Bateman from a screenplay by David Lindsay-Abaire, based on the 2011 novel of the same name by Kevin Wilson. The film stars Bateman, Nicole Kidman, and Christopher Walken.

The Family Fang was released in the United States by Starz Digital on April 29, 2016.

== Plot ==
The family Fang enters a bank, Baxter robs a teller of her lollipops, shoots and Caleb rushes him as a security guard. Their mother Camille pretends to be shot, and Annie grieves over her body. They get up and leave, Caleb giving a speech about cherishing life and bows.

The adult Annie, a failing actress, is on a film set where the director has asked her to go topless in a scene. Initially refusing, she later returns to the set without her top. A crew member snaps her photo, selling it to a tabloid.

The adult Baxter sees the photos in a convenience store. After having published two novels, he accepts a job writing about potato guns. Drinking with his subjects, Baxter allows them to perform the William Tell on him, resulting in his hospitalization. The Fangs reunite over the injury.

Caleb tries to enlist Annie and Baxter, whom he calls "A and B", into a new piece of performance art but she vehemently declines. Giving fake coupons for free chicken sandwiches at a food court, Baxter is to film the ensuing chaos and angered customers when the cashier declines to honor them. To Caleb's dismay, she gives free sandwiches to all who ask, making him irate. His kids feel their parents have lost any artistic merit they once had.

During their reunion, Annie watches old tapes of the family's performance art, and a documentary about her parents. It captures Caleb's sophomoric and didactic performance pieces, like shooting Hobart with a crossbow. Annie recalls another piece featuring her and Baxter busking in Central Park with songs like "KAP (Kill All Parents)". Camille and Caleb heckle them, horrifying onlookers. Later, the family laughs about it.

Annie finds a hidden panel in her old wardrobe, with several odd postcard sized paintings. As the siblings comment on how good they are, Camille walks in and panically tries to collect and hide them. Camille explains Caleb doesn't know about her drawing again as he wouldn't approve.

After the chicken sandwich prank failed. Caleb and Camille go away to the Berkshires for a few days. After a short while, police report their disappearance as their car was found with blood on the dashboard. Annie tells them the blood is fake and the disappearance is just one of Caleb's pieces. Baxter isn't so sure, simply believing they won't see them again. Annie becomes obsessed with finding them.

Annie recalls her senior year high school Romeo and Juliet performance where Romeo could not make it. Baxter was his understudy, but he balks at having to kiss his sister onstage. He reluctantly agrees, but when the audience laughs at his attempts to avoid kissing Annie, she is humiliated.

When Baxter finally gives Annie a full kiss onstage, drama teacher Miss Delano gets fired. She later tells them it was worth it to be a part of one of Caleb and Camille's more elaborate pieces. The kids are horrified, and refuse to continue doing performances with their parents. In the documentary, Caleb confesses that until realizing he could use his children as living art, he was uninterested in being a father.

Having a yard sale at their parents', they find a CD by the Vengeful Virgins with a cover of "KAP", known only to the Fangs. Tracking down the teenage twins in the band, Annie interrogates them while Baxter searches the house. He finds video of Caleb smearing his own blood in his car. Miss Delano comes home, revealing she is the boys' mother. Caleb enters behind her, and he reluctantly takes them to Camille.

This final piece has been planned for years. Caleb and Miss Delano have acted as husband and wife, accidentally having the twins. Camille has been spending time in a small town as a widow for several months every year. Each establishing separate identities, they feel this piece is a fitting end to their career. Begging Annie and Baxter to help keep their secret, they bitterly agree.

Annie and Baxter are happier and better balanced after letting go of their parents.

== Cast ==
- Nicole Kidman as Annie Fang
  - Taylor Rose as young Annie Fang (at 18)
  - Mackenzie Smith as young Annie Fang (at 13)
- Jason Bateman as Baxter Fang
  - Kyle Donnery as young Baxter Fang (at 16)
  - Jack McCarthy as young Baxter Fang (at 11)
- Christopher Walken as Caleb Fang
  - Jason Butler Harner as young Caleb Fang
- Maryann Plunkett as Camille Fang
  - Kathryn Hahn as young Camille Fang
- Frank Harts as Officer Dunham
- Harris Yulin as Hobart Waxman
- Josh Pais as Freeman
- Grainger Hines as Sheriff Hale
- Robbie Tann as Arden
- Michael Chernus as Kenny
- Gabriel Ebert as Joseph
- Eddie Mitchell as Lucas
- Patrick Mitchell as Linus
- Linda Emond as Miss Delano
- Scott Shepherd as Art Critic
- Charlie Saxton as Chicken Queen Manager
- Jen Taylor as Mrs. Ralph – Nurse (uncredited)

== Production ==
On October 27, 2011, it was announced that the film rights to the Kevin Wilson novel The Family Fang were bought by actress Nicole Kidman's Blossom Films company. Kidman and Per Saari would be reuniting with their Rabbit Hole co-producers at Olympus Films, Leslie Urdang and Dean Vanech. On May 8, 2012, screenwriter David Lindsay-Abaire was set to adapt the film for Kidman. On November 1, 2013, it was announced that actor Jason Bateman will direct and star alongside Kidman as her brother in the film, and QED International would finance the film. On May 5, 2014, Christopher Walken was cast as Caleb Fang, the siblings' father.

=== Filming ===
The filming for The Family Fang began on July 14, 2014, in New York City and later that month in Suffern, New York.

== Reception ==
Early reviews from TIFF praised the film and Kidman's performance.

The film received an 83% score on aggregate site Rotten Tomatoes with a consensus: "Layered performances from Nicole Kidman and director-star Jason Bateman add extra depth to The Family Fang's sharply observed look at domestic dysfunction."

== Release ==
The film had its world premiere at the 2015 Toronto International Film Festival on September 14, 2015. Shortly, after Starz Digital acquired U.S. distribution rights to the film. The film was released on April 29, 2016, by Starz Digital.
