= Bottled Up (film) =

- Film poster
- Directed by: Enid Zentelis
- Written by: Enid Zentelis
- Produced by: Amanda Beckner; Anthony Brandonisio; Riel Roch Decter; Erik S. Weigel; Enid Zentelis
- Starring: Melissa Leo; Marin Ireland; Josh Hamilton
- Cinematography: Daniel Sharnoff
- Edited by: Mollie Goldstein
- Music by: Tim Boland; Sam Retzer
- Production company: Olympus Pictures
- Distributed by: Freestyle Releasing; Osiris Entertainment
- Release date: April 19, 2013 (Tribeca)
- Running time: 84 minutes
- Country: United States
- Language: English

Bottled Up is a 2013 American drama film written and directed by Enid Zentelis and starring Melissa Leo, Marin Ireland and Josh Hamilton.

== Cast ==
- Melissa Leo as Fay
- Marin Ireland as Sylvie
- Josh Hamilton as Becket
- Jamie Harrold as Jerry
- Fredric Lehne as Agent Rodgers

== Reception ==
As of June 2020, the film holds a 33% approval rating on Rotten Tomatoes, based on six reviews with an average rating of 5.12 out of 10. Tirdad Derakhshani of The Philadelphia Inquirer awarded the film three stars out of four.
