= 28 Hotel Rooms =

2012 drama film by Matt Ross

- Directed by: Matt Ross
- Screenplay by: Matt Ross
- Produced by: Lynette Howell; Louise Runge; Samantha Housman
- Starring: Chris Messina; Marin Ireland
- Cinematography: Doug Emmett
- Edited by: Joseph Krings
- Production companies: Mott Street Pictures; OneZero Productions; Silverwood Films
- Distributed by: Oscilloscope
- Release dates: January 21, 2012 (Sundance); November 9, 2012 (United States)
- Running time: 82 minutes
- Country: United States
- Language: English
- Box office: $18,869

28 Hotel Rooms is a 2012 American drama film written and directed by Matt Ross and starring Chris Messina and Marin Ireland. It is Ross' first feature film. The film centers on the affair conducted between a novelist and a corporate accountant over a period of several years. The story takes a minimalist approach, consisting only of scenes between the couple in hotel rooms.

== Plot ==
The film tracks the affair that occurs over the course of a decade between a man, an author, and a woman, a corporate accountant. The two—both of whom are unnamed—choose to meet in hotels whenever they are in the same city. The film is divided into various chapters, with each chapter named after their room numbers.

The man, who is based in New York, first meets the woman, a West Coast native, when he is on a tour promoting his successful novel. The couple have a one-night stand at a hotel, after which the woman assures the man she will not contact him again. Conversely, they end up reuniting for a tryst at a different hotel some time later. Their affair spans years and continues despite the man marrying someone else and settling down with his wife in Maine. The woman also gets married but it is revealed that her marriage dissolves as well. In the intervening years, the man's career as a novelist fizzles, leading him to take a job as an English teacher at his local college.

At different points in time, the lovers bring up the possibility of leaving their significant others so they can be together, but neither of them can face it and seem resigned at carrying on their affair.

== Cast ==
- Marin Ireland as woman
- Chris Messina as man
- Robert Deamer as bartender
- Brett Collier as bar patron
- Devin Schumacher as hotel concierge

== Production ==
Matt Ross' original idea was to make an intimate film about a relationship that would primarily focus on characters rather than plot. He stated that "the genesis of this movie came out of conversations I had with Chris Messina".

After two weeks of rehearsal, filming began in Los Angeles and continued for a week or two. During this time Marin Ireland was flying back and forth between Los Angeles and New York, where she was filming the HBO miniseries Mildred Pierce. The film was edited during the next couple of months, and it was determined that certain additional scenes were needed to help further define the relationship between the two characters. These last remaining scenes were shot in New York over the course of about another week. Filming took in total about 18 days.

Before and during the shooting of the film, Ross encouraged the actors to collaborate in its development, resulting in more than 49 hours of material, some of it scripted and some improvised. During postproduction, many different complete versions of film were created, with scenes in different orders, different plots, and different beginnings or endings, before one version was selected as the final cut.

== Critical response ==
On Rotten Tomatoes the film has an approval rating of 47% based on reviews from 15 critics. Metacritic gave it a score of 50% based on reviews from 10 critics.

Variety found the film "neither dramatically nor intellectually stimulating despite good chemistry between the lead actors". Slant gave it 1.5 out of 4 stars. The Village Voice felt that the characters weren't properly fleshed out, and that the film's stripped-down, minimalist approach prevented a sense of getting insight into their lives. The New York Times was also unimpressed, praising the quality of the acting but noting a lack of any dramatic tension drama or passion in the characters' relationships with each other.
