= The Dark and the Wicked =

2020 film by Bryan Bertino

- Film poster
- Directed by: Bryan Bertino
- Written by: Bryan Bertino
- Produced by: Bryan Bertino; Adrienne Biddle; Sonny Mallhi; Kevin Matusow
- Starring: Marin Ireland; Michael Abbott Jr.; Xander Berkeley
- Cinematography: Tristan Nyby
- Edited by: William Boodell; Zachary Weintraub
- Music by: Tom Schraeder
- Production companies: Unbroken Pictures; The Traveling Picture Show Company; Inwood Road Films
- Distributed by: RLJE Films
- Release dates: August 28, 2020 (Fantasia); November 6, 2020 (United States)
- Running time: 95 minutes
- Country: United States
- Language: English
- Box office: $422,174

The Dark and the Wicked is a 2020 American Southern Gothic supernatural horror film written and directed by Bryan Bertino, starring Marin Ireland, Michael Abbott Jr., and Xander Berkeley. It follows two siblings who encounter a demonic entity at their Texas family farm after the suicide of their mother, who had long been caring for their infirm father.

The film had its world premiere at the Fantasia International Film Festival on August 28, 2020. It was released on November 6, 2020, by RLJE Films.

== Plot ==
Siblings Louise and Michael return to their family farm in Texas when their father's chronic illness seems to be reaching its last stages. Their mother seems disturbed at their arrival and expresses a desire for the children to leave. That night, she hangs herself in the barn after (apparently involuntarily) cutting off her own fingers in the kitchen.

As time goes on, Louise and Michael start to understand what happened to their mother. Their father’s nurse confides in them that she heard their mother whispering to their father, but it seemed as if she was speaking not to him but some other presence. Michael finds their mother's diary, which describes her fears of an unnamed and possibly demonic presence preying on her husband.

At their mother's burial, Louise and Michael meet Father Thorne, a priest who claims to have known their mother. Later that night, Father Thorne appears at the farm, beckoning them from outside, asking them if they want some rope, before vanishing before their eyes. Meanwhile, Charlie, a ranch hand who lives on a nearby plot of land in his RV, tries to call Michael, but then witnesses a vision of what appears to be Louise, speaking indistinctly and cutting herself repeatedly with a kitchen knife. The entity drives a distraught Charlie to shoot himself in the head with his shotgun.

Louise is subsequently unable to reach Charlie by phone, unaware that he is dead. Louise calls the phone number that Father Thorne gave her to ask why he visited the farm the night prior. The man who answers claims to have never met her and says that he lives in Chicago and has never been to Texas. Worried for their father's safety, the siblings summon a doctor for a house call and request that he be moved to a hospital. The doctor determines that their father's health is grave and that he is on his deathbed. He tells the siblings that he cannot relocate him to a hospital, as moving him could result in him dying en route.

On the farm, Louise and Michael find that their large herd of goats have all been brutally killed. The two start a bonfire to dispose of the numerous animal carcasses. That night, Michael is approached in the barn by an apparition of his nude mother, who disappears as she approaches him. She appears behind him and the apparition tries to possess Michael and make him to cut his own throat, but he narrowly resists its influence. Later, while Louise lies in bed beside her father, she has a nightmare in which the entity attempts to possess her father, but she manages to block out its presence, before witnessing her father levitating against the ceiling and urging her to flee.

In the morning, Charlie's granddaughter arrives at the farm and informs Louise that he killed himself two days prior. The girl's forlorn demeanor soon turns malevolent, and Louise realizes it is in fact the entity taking the shape of Charlie's granddaughter. She too disappears before Louise's eyes. The nurse arrives moments later to care for Louise and Michael's father. Meanwhile, Louise finds that Michael has fled the farm to return to his wife and daughters, leaving her behind. Michael calls Louise from his cell phone and tells her she too should leave. Moments later, the nurse, possessed by the entity, begins stabbing herself with a pair of knitting needles, attacking Louise in the process, before stabbing herself in the eyes, killing herself.

Michael arrives at his home and finds the dead bodies of his daughters and wife in the kitchen, in what appears to have been a murder–suicide. A distraught Michael cuts his own throat, and moments after, observes that the bodies of his wife and daughters have disappeared. He realizes the entity has tricked him when his wife and daughters enter the house moments later, and find him bleeding to death.

Back at the farm, Louise regains consciousness at nightfall and finds that her father is dying. Moments after he dies, the demon in turn attacks and claims her.

== Cast ==
- Marin Ireland as Louise
- Michael Abbott Jr. as Michael
- Xander Berkeley as Father Thorne
- Lynn Andrews as Nurse
- Julie Oliver-Touchstone as Mother
- Michael Zagst as Father
- Tom Nowicki as Charlie
- Ella Ballentine as Young Girl

== Production ==
Filming of The Dark and the Wicked took place in Texas at the actual farm owned by writer-director Bryan Bertino's parents.

== Release ==
The film had its world premiere at the Fantasia International Film Festival on August 28, 2020. RLJE Films had acquired distribution rights to the film and set it for a November 6, 2020 theatrical release. It was originally scheduled to have its world premiere at the Tribeca Film Festival in April 2020; however, the festival was cancelled due to the COVID-19 pandemic.

== Reception ==
=== Box office ===
The film earned $410,787 at the global box office.

=== Critical response ===
On review aggregator website Rotten Tomatoes, the film holds an approval rating of 91% based on 107 critic reviews, with an average rating of 7.5/10. The website's critics consensus reads: "The Dark and the Wicked delivers on its title with an unsettling horror story whose deep dread and bleak outlook further compound its effective jolts." Metacritic reports a score of 72 out of 100 based on 14 critic reviews, indicating "generally favorable" reviews.

Cath Clarke of The Guardian gave the film a score of 3 out of 5 stars, describing it as "a nastily effective, lo-fi, psychological haunted house horror", and added: "There is possibly not a single scary moment here that will be new to horror fans, but Bertino directs with such technical flair that I yelped at most of them – and half-missed the others, eyes squeezed tight shut." Matt Zoller Seitz of RogerEbert.com gave the film a score of 3 out of 4 stars, writing that it "has enough jump scares to satisfy the 'Yes, but it is scary?' contingent of horror fans. But for the most part, this film ... focuses on atmosphere and creeping dread, channeling 20th century classics like Don't Look Now, The Tenant, the original Alien and The Sixth Sense." Dan Stubbs praised the film, calling it a "relentlessly bleak Southern Gothic horror" portraying the declining mental health of American farmers as a real villain.

Kate Erbland of IndieWire was more critical of the film, giving it a grade of C. She praised Ireland's performance, but wrote that the film "despite a strong start ... never coalesces into anything more than a collection of chilling images and a paper-thin logic."
