= Glass Chin =

- Directed by: Noah Buschel
- Screenplay by: Noah Buschel
- Produced by: Samantha Housman; Louisa Runge; Susan A. Stover
- Starring: Corey Stoll; Billy Crudup; Marin Ireland; Yul Vazquez; Kelly Lynch
- Cinematography: Ryan Samul
- Edited by: Jennifer Ruff
- Production company: OneZero Productions
- Distributed by: Phase 4 Films
- Release dates: April 19, 2014 (Tribeca Film Festival); June 26, 2015
- Running time: 87 minutes
- Country: United States
- Language: English

Glass Chin is a 2014 American crime drama film written and directed by Noah Buschel, starring Corey Stoll, Billy Crudup, Marin Ireland, Yul Vazquez and Kelly Lynch. It premiered at the 2014 Tribeca Film Festival.

== Plot ==
Bud Gordon (Corey Stoll), a burned-out former boxing champ, lives with his girlfriend Ellen Doyle (Marin Ireland). He has retired from boxing after an unexpected loss in his last match, leading many throughout the film to mock him as a "glass chin".

Bud takes up an offer to train Kid Sunshine (Malcolm Xavier), an up-and-coming welterweight contender, for a future match. Meanwhile, he meets JJ Cook (Billy Crudup), a slick Manhattan entrepreneur and crime boss, for a job. JJ assigns him to debt collecting, partnering him with Roberto Flash (Yul Vazquez), a criminal under his pay. During an assignment, Roberto asks Bud to sneak him into a building, as the debtor recognizes Roberto from prior visits and would not have let him in. As they reach the debtor's apartment, Roberto asks Bud to wait in the car. The day after, Bud discovers that the debtor was killed. Confronting a sleepy Roberto over the phone, Bud realizes that he had been played: as he was sneaking inside to let Roberto in, Bud was recorded on camera, framing him for the murder. JJ, possessing the footage, plans to blackmail Bud: Get Kid Sunshine to throw his match in the first round, or the footage will be released to the police.

Bud's relationship with his girlfriend crumbles and it is revealed that JJ was the one who screwed Bud in his last match. Before the bout, Roberto confronts him outside Kid Sunshine's locker room, pleading with him to do the right thing and let Kid Sunshine lose. A voiceover for the commentary is heard, detailing the match and Kid Sunshine surviving the first round. Outside, Bud, listening to the match on his limo's radio, hears police sirens. When asked by the driver why the police are after him, Bud replies: "Right hand lead".

== Cast ==
- Corey Stoll as Bud Gordon
- Billy Crudup as JJ Cook
- Marin Ireland as Ellen Doyle
- Yul Vazquez as Roberto Flash
- Kelly Lynch as Mae Graham
- Katherine Waterston as Patricia "Petals" O'Neal
- Elizabeth Rodriguez as Rita Sierra
- Brendan Sexton III as Jimmy Musial
- Michael Chernus as Brian Colby
- David Johansen as Stanley Loori
- Ron Cephas Jones as Ray Ellington
- John Ventimiglia as Jack Marchiano
- Halley Feiffer as Kathryn Glassman
- Ivan Martin as Detective Gerard Herko
- Anthony Arkin as Homer Nicholas
- Rodrigo Lopresti as Ben McLemore
- Albert Jones as Don Marbury
- Malcolm Xavier as Kid Sunshine
- Emily Fleischer as Maurine Stuart
- John Douglas Thompson as Lou Gibson
- Steven Marcus as Gil Dunphy
- Michael McCartney as Aaron Judlowe
- Cortez Nance Jr. as Hernandez Alou
- Kapil Bawa as Mingus Ali Khan
- Charlie V. Wilson as Robert Aitken
- Olivia Killingsworth as Caron Levis
- Armand Dahan as Claude Papillion
- Marina Dee as Lidia Bernik
- Woodrow Morton as Soen Mayo
- Harry Keitt as Floyd Judah

== Production ==
Shortly after Corey Stoll finished filming the first season of House of Cards, Noah Buschel recruited him to play the lead role in Glass Chin. Stoll had previous boxing training from his portrayal of Ernest Hemingway in the 2011 film Midnight in Paris. He trained for three weeks at Gleason's Gym in Brooklyn, New York. Billy Crudup was given the script by Yul Vazquez, who had previously worked with Buschel.

Buschel categorizes the film "in the ex-boxer genre of Budd Schulberg's On The Waterfront, Jim Thompson's After Dark, My Sweet, and Walter Mosley's Leonid McGill books." The film was shot all over New York City, including in Red Hook, Brooklyn, and in New Jersey, on a Red digital camera. It was Buschel's third film with cinematographer Ryan Samul.

== Release ==
Glass Chin premiered at the 2014 Tribeca Film Festival on April 19, 2014, where it was one of 12 films selected for the World Narrative Competition. It was given a limited theatrical release on June 26, 2015.

Buschel wrote about the cynicism of the distributors who falsely advertised Glass Chin as a gun movie. "Targeting Kids: Should the MPAA Rate Gun Violence in Movies?". December 13, 2015.

== Critical response ==
On Rotten Tomatoes, the film has a critics' approval rating of 85% based on 20 reviews and an average rating of 7/10. Metacritic rated it 64/100 based on 10 reviews. The performances were widely praised, those of Stoll and Crudup in particular. The Los Angeles Times said the film is fueled by "punchy dialogue, sharply drawn characters and excellent performances," and that Buschel's directing gives it "a distinct place in the often derivative world of neo-noir." Indiewire called the film "the work of an underappreciated and sharp filmmaker" and "one of the strongest films ever to grace the international narrative competition at the Tribeca Film Festival," giving it an A−: "Glass Chin confirms Buschel to be among the most interesting voices lurking in the margins of American cinema. It is a boxing picture without a single fight, a thriller where the murder takes place off screen, a slow burn modern neo-noir with dialogue as memorable as Mamet’s that wears the cadences and uninflected, symmetrical compositions of an Ozu picture effortlessly, mixing these influences in a way that seems all its own." Slant gave it 4 out of 5 stars, The Village Voice called it "[a] rich character study that captures the inner lives and unexpectedly astute insights of brusque, macho, old-school New York guys and the women in their lives." Frank Scheck of The Hollywood Reporter wrote, "For all its impressive formal rigor, this modern-day noir fails to connect on an emotional level." Nicolas Rapold of The New York Times wrote that it "feels designed to within an inch of its life". Bilge Ebiri of Vulture.com wrote, "Story-wise, nothing in Glass Chin will surprise you. But stylistically, the film's got something cool going on." Peter Debruge of Variety wrote, "Between Buschel's script and Stoll's performance, Glass Chin finds fresh humanity in a seemingly exhausted genre." Frank Lovece of Film Journal International wrote, "It's surely no coincidence, given the interest that Bud's Jersey-girl girlfriend Ellen (Marin Ireland) takes in Zen teachings. that the hero's name could be short for Buddhist. Whatever the reasoning, Glass Chin is a remarkable little movie with a distinct rhythm and such a startling swirl of nihilistic honor that you want to see where Buschel goes from here. Like a West-of-Hudson Abel Ferrara, whose silver-blue King of New York color scheme infuses this film's Manhattan, Buschel explores the lies we tell ourselves about being an honorable man in a dishonorable world."

The Los Angeles Times cited Crudup's performance as one of the eight efforts that measure up to the Oscar nominees, saying that he "stole the show".

Ireland was nominated for an Independent Spirit Award for Best Supporting Actress.
