= Southern Gothic (2007 film) =

2007 film directed by Mark Young

Southern Gothic is a 2007 American film starring Yul Vasquez, William Forsythe, Jonathan Sachar and Nicole Duport, directed by Mark Young.

== Premise ==
A cult preacher, seeking the favours from a stripper, becomes a vampire.

== Cast ==
- Yul Vazquez as Hazel Fortune
- William Forsythe as Pitt
- Jonathan Sachar as Daniel
- Nicole DuPort as Starla
- Dani Englander as Ava
- Emily Catherine Young as Hope
- William Boyer as Virgil
- April Carroll as Firegirl
- Steve Fortner as Zeek
- Brett Gentile as Melvin
- Bob Hungerford as Motel Clerk
- Carrie Anne Hunt as Cheerleader
- Joe Inscoe as Silas Freeman
- Johanna Jowett as Crystal
- David Loyer as Strip Club Patron

== Home video ==
A DVD version was released in 2010.

== Reception ==
Eye For Film gave the film a mixed review stating, "It also doesn't help that the film's best moment, in which a serial killer type stabs a woman to death only for her to then rise up and rip his jugular open, comes right at the start, establishing expectations that the remainder cannot fulfill." The German film magazine Cinema was more negative and described the film as "A B-movie that is visually shocking, but 'lacks blood' in terms of content and technique." as was FilmDienst, judging it was a "(v)isually rather restrained, otherwise highly abstruse horror film that uses the genre as a background for a wildly confused love story."

Mountain Xpress film critic Ken Hanke could not finish watching director Mark Young's previous film Phreaker so felt uneasy about Southern Gothic which he concluded was "a much better work and certainly worth a look for genre fans". In a positive review, Matt Brunson of Creative Loafing Charlotte wrote, "Narratively, local filmmaker Mark Young's vampire tale may not seem as original as his past efforts Phreaker and Dead Bodies, but visually, it (pardon the pun) goes right for the jugular, and it offers a juicy role to character actor William Forsythe (The Devil's Rejects) as a bloodsucking preacher."

In a negative review of the film, Rue Morgue's Jason Lapeyre wrote, "Almost every line of dialogue is ridiculous, never once sounding like something a human being would actually say. ... The clunky dialogue would be forgiveable if the movie was any fun, but instead it's weighed down by a faux seriousness that turns every scene into a boring drag".
