= Cook County (film) =

- Directed by: David Pomes
- Written by: David Pomes
- Produced by: David Pomes
- Cinematography: Brad Rushing
- Edited by: Branan Edgens
- Release date: March 26, 2009 (Buenos Aires)
- Running time: 93 minutes
- Country: United States
- Language: English

Cook County (alternate title: Pure White B*tch) is a 2009 American independent drama film written, directed, and produced by Houston-based filmmaker David Pomes. The film stars Anson Mount, Xander Berkeley, and Ryan Donowho. It deals with the effects of methamphetamine addiction on a Texas family.

== Cast ==
- Anson Mount as "Bump"
- Xander Berkeley as "Sonny"
- Ryan Donowho as Abe
- Polly Cole as Lucy
- Rutherford Cravens as Earl "Fat Earl"
- Makenna Fitzsimmons as Deandra
- Brandon Smith as Wayne
- John McClain as Uncle J.D.
- Yankie Grant as Aunt Sally
- J.D. Hawkins as "Peanut"
- Gary Chason as Mr. Jimmy
- Lisa Williams as Miss Debbie
- Toby Lister as Bill Jenkins
- Tommy Townsend as Pee Paw
- Scott Nankivel as Luke
- Anna Megan Raley as Cindy Simpson
- Trappy as David Damien (credited as Omar Adam)
- Deke Anderson as Officer Crumley
- Allison Norman as Phoebe Tims
- James Wiley Fowler as Officer Simmons (credited as James Fowler)

== Production ==
In an interview appearing on indiewire.com, Pomes stated: "The story began about people who I have been around, living outside of civilization, out in the woods, down a dirt road with all the old stereotypes: the roof caving in and the tires in the front yard. The story is about that group of people, and the family trying to be a family in the backwoods environment. Crystal meth was always out there. I was never at any crystal meth parties or anything like that, but there were always people where I lived outside of Houston. Those are the characters in the film, but crystal meth really drives the story. It's the vehicle."

Not having direct contact with meth addicts, Pomes read widely on the subject of drug addiction. Pomes recounted in an interview for Filmmaker Magazine: "I did a ton of research. Mostly just through the Internet, through magazine articles and things of that nature. I did a lot. There is so much out there. People on meth like to talk about it. They like to take [sic] about the process of making it, the problems they have with it. There are tons of blogs out there, websites, people write songs and poetry about it [laughs]. Not in a good way necessarily, or a glorifying way, but just how it’s affected there [sic] lives. There’s recipes out there, you don’t just have to make it one way. There’s a bunch of different ways to do it. We found lots of pictures of people on meth and meth labs and used those to inspire us a bit for wardrobe, makeup, art direction, the general aesthetic of the movie."
