= Marin Ireland =

American actress

- Ireland in 2026
- Born: August 30, 1979 (age 47); Camarillo, California, U.S.
- Education: University of Hartford (BFA)
- Occupation: Actress
- Years active: 2000–present

Marin Ireland (born August 30, 1979) is an American actress and playwright. Known for her work in theatre and independent films, The New York Times deemed Ireland "one of the great drama queens of the New York stage". She has received nominations for two Independent Spirit Awards and one Tony Award.

Following a series of guest roles in the Law & Order franchise (2003–2008), Ireland earned praise when she starred in Neil LaBute's Reasons to Be Pretty (2008), for which she was nominated for the Tony Award for Best Featured Actress in a Play. After parts in films such as The Understudy and Rachel Getting Married (both 2008), Ireland's role in Glass Chin (2014) earned her a nomination for the Independent Spirit Award for Best Supporting Female. Her other film credits include The Family Fang (2015), Hell or High Water (2016), Piercing, The Miseducation of Cameron Post (both 2018), The Irishman (2019), The Dark and the Wicked (2020), and Eileen (2023).

On television, Ireland played Julia Bowman in the Amazon Studios series Sneaky Pete (2015–2019), Sissy Cooper in Netflix's The Umbrella Academy (2020–2022), and Nora Brady in Hulu's Y: The Last Man (2021).

== Early life and education ==
A native of Camarillo, California, Ireland was born on August 30, 1979. She earned a Bachelor of Fine Arts degree from The Hartt School, the performing-arts conservatory at the University of Hartford in West Hartford, Connecticut.

== Career ==
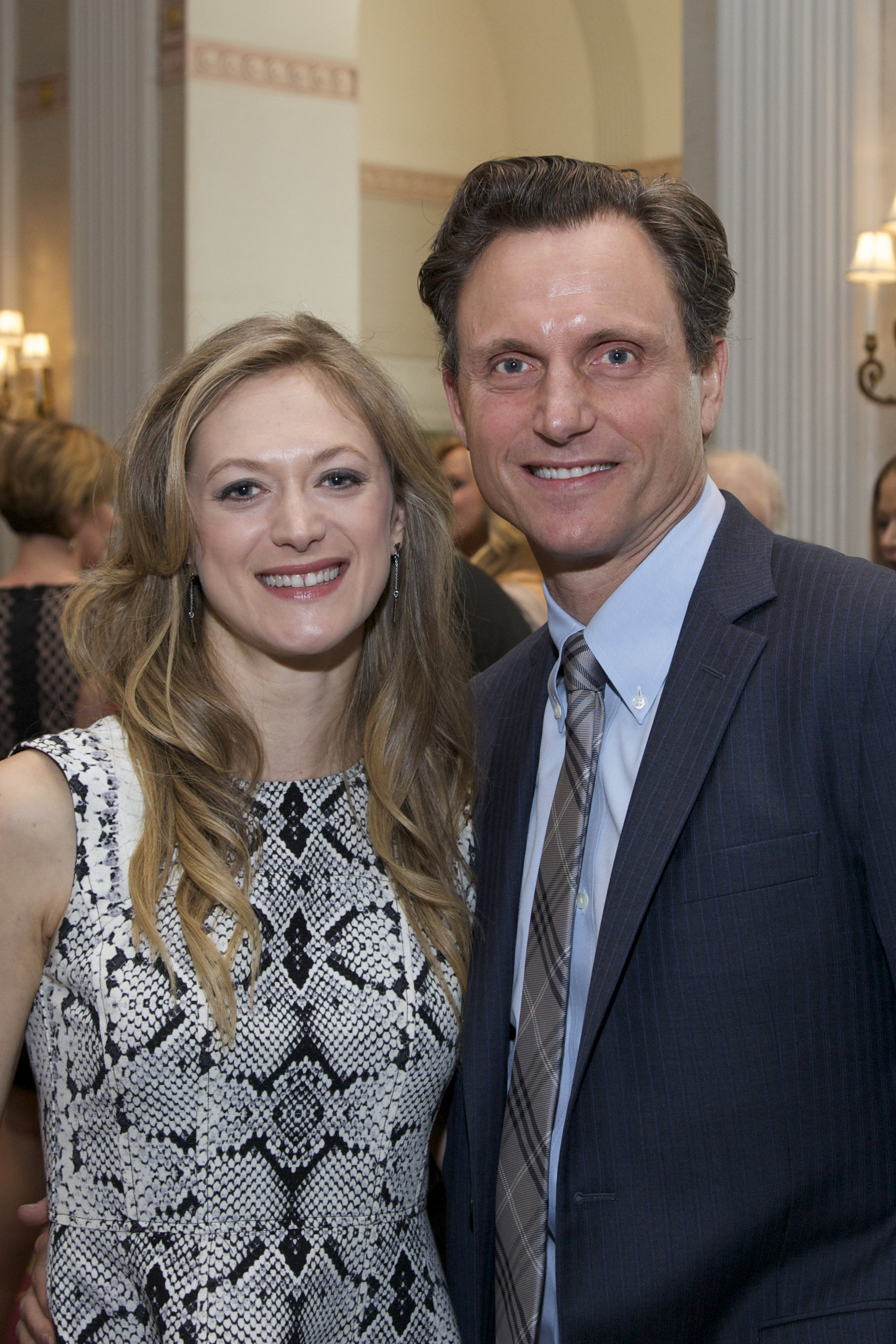
Ireland and actor Tony Goldwyn at the 2014 Peabody Awards

Ireland made her off-Broadway theatre debut in Nocturne (2001), a play written by Adam Rapp, which ran at the New York Theatre Workshop. She also appeared in the play during its run in the American Repertory Theatre New Stages presentation at the Hasty Pudding Theatre, Cambridge, Massachusetts in October 2000. Her other off-Broadway work includes Caryl Churchill's Far Away (2002) at the New York Theatre Workshop. She played the title role in Sabina (2005) by Willy Holtzman at Primary Stages.

Ireland was featured in the 2008 stage adaptation of The Beebo Brinker Chronicles, a series of lesbian pulp fiction novels by Ann Bannon. She made her Broadway theatre debut in Reasons to Be Pretty (2009). For this performance, she received a nomination for the Tony Award for Best Featured Actress in a Play, and won the Theatre World Award. She then appeared in After Miss Julie in a Roundabout Theatre Company presentation of a Donmar Warehouse production at the American Airlines Theatre in September through December 2009. Ireland in the New Group revival of A Lie of the Mind in February and March 2010.

Ireland's early film roles are the drama Rachel Getting Married (2008) and the comedy The Understudy (2008). In 2012, she played the female lead role in the Matt Ross debut film 28 Hotel Rooms. For playing Ellen Doyle in Glass Chin (2014), she earned a nomination for the Independent Spirit Award for Best Supporting Female. In November 2012, she starred in the title role of Marie Antoinette in the world premiere at the Yale Repertory Theatre. She starred in the Lincoln Center Theatre production of Abe Koogler's Kill Floor in 2015. She has also appeared in the films The Family Fang (2015), Hell or High Water (2016), Piercing (2018), The Miseducation of Cameron Post (2018), and The Irishman (2019).

In 2012, while working on a Wooster Group production of Troilus and Cressida in London, Ireland dated costar Scott Shepherd. During that period, the couple fought physically at home, with Ireland once appearing at rehearsals with a black eye. Ireland later expressed disappointment that the Wooster Group did not do more to support her, and has lobbied theater unions to create protocols for handling misconduct. After a meeting with civil rights lawyer Norman Siegel in 2017 at the Public Theater, where they discussed ways of combatting sexual harassment, they launched the Human Resources for the Arts in January 2018. It aims to be a pro bono mediation system where the victim and a perpetrator come to a resolution using a third party not working at a theater.

Ireland has gained prominence in the television industry, notably for her roles as Julia in the Amazon series Sneaky Pete (2015–2019), Sissy in the Netflix series The Umbrella Academy (2020–2022), and Nora Brady in the Hulu post-apocalyptic drama series Y: The Last Man (2021). Her leading role in the horror film The Dark and the Wicked (2020) earned her praise.

Ireland has narrated several audiobooks, including bestsellers by Frederik Backman, Anthony Doerr, and Amor Towles. She was awarded an Audie Award for Best Female Narrator in 2020 for her recording of Nothing to See Here by Kevin Wilson.

In 2024, a play she wrote, Pre-Existing Condition, was produced off-Broadway at the Connelly Theater Upstairs with a rotating cast of actresses (including Tatiana Maslany, Tavi Gevinson, Deirdre O’Connell, Edie Falco, and Julia Chan). In 2026, it was restaged at the Greenwich House Theatre; this time the rotating cast included Lupita Nyong'o, Phillipa Soo, Susannah Flood, Whitney White, Hari Nef, and Edie Falco (again).

== Filmography ==
=== Film ===
Year	Title	Role	Notes
2004	The Manchurian Candidate	Army Transcriber	
2007	Suburban Girl	Katie	
2007	Mercy	Joyce	Short film
2007	I Am Legend	Woman Evacuee	
2008	The Understudy	Rebecca	
2008	Rachel Getting Married	Angela Paylin	
2008	The Loss of a Teardrop Diamond	Esmeralda	
2008	If You Could Say It in Words	Sadie Mitchell	
2008	Revolutionary Road	Party Guest	
2009	Brief Interviews with Hideous Men	Samantha	
2010	Megafauna	Anna	Short film
2012	28 Hotel Rooms	Woman	
2012	Future Weather	Tanya	
2012	Allison	Allison	Short film
2012	Hope Springs	Molly	
2012	The Letter	Anita	
2012	Stars in Shorts	Wife	Film: "Sexting"
2012	Sparrows Dance	Woman in Apartment	
2013	Side Effects	Upset Visitor	
2013	Bottled Up	Sylvie	
2014	Glass Chin	Ellen Doyle	
2014	Take Care	Laila	
2014	Kill Me	Lucy	Short film
2015	The Family Fang	Suzanne Crosby	
2015	This Summer Feeling	Nina	
2016	Hell or High Water	Debbie Howard	
2016	In the Radiant City	Laura Yurley	
2017	The Strange Ones	Crystal	
2017	Aardvark	Jenny	
2017	Sollers Point	Kate	
2017	Some Freaks	Georgia	
2018	Piercing	Reed's mother	
2018	The Miseducation of Cameron Post	Bethany	
2019	Light from Light	Shelia	
2019	The Irishman	Dolores Sheeran	
2020	The Dark and the Wicked	Louise	
2020	The Empty Man	Nora Quail	
2023	Eileen	Anne Polk	
2023	Birth/Rebirth	Dr. Rose Casper	
2023	The Boogeyman	Rita Billings	
2023	Somewhere Quiet	Madelin Whitman	
2025	Materialists	Violet	
2026	Anima	Mikaela	
2026	The Last Day	Ellen	
TBA	Untitled David Mackenzie film †		Post-production

=== Television ===
Year	Title	Role	Notes
2003	Law & Order: Criminal Intent	Anais Hutchinson	Episode: "Zoonotic"
2006	Law & Order: Criminal Intent	Laura Booth	Episode: "Dramma Giocoso"
2006	Law & Order: Special Victims Unit	Gina Maylor	Episode: "Confrontation"
2008	Law & Order	Mila Hames Lingard	Episode: "Called Home"
2011	Mildred Pierce	Letty	Recurring role; 5 episodes
2011	The Good Wife	Marjorie Garnett	Episode: "In Sickness"
2011	A Gifted Man	Elena	Episodes: "Pilot", "In Case of Discomfort", "In Case of Exposure"
2011	Prime Suspect	Jodi Barrett	Episode: "Gone to Pieces"
2011–2012	Homeland	Aileen Morgan	Recurring role; 5 episodes
2012	Unforgettable	Sarah Green	Episode: "Heartbreak"
2012	Boss	Claire Mann	Episodes: "The Conversation", "Consequence", "Clinch", "True Enough"
2012–2014	The Killing	Liz Holder	Episode: "Off the Reservation" & "The Good Soldier"
2013	The Following	Amanda	Episode: "Love Hurts"
2014	The Divide	Christine Rosa	Recurring role; 8 episodes
2014	Masters of Sex	Pauline Masters	3 episodes
2014	Madam Secretary	Gina Fisher	Episode: "The Operative"
2015	The Slap	Sandi Apostolou	8 episodes
2015	Girls	Logan	3 episodes
2015	Law & Order: Special Victims Unit	Bella Carisi	Episode: "Parole Violations"
2015	Elementary	Alta Von See	Episode: "Evidence of Things Not Seen"
2015–2019	Sneaky Pete	Julia Bowman	Main role
2017	Flint	Melissa Mays	Television film
2018	Bull	Maya Whitbeck	Episode: "Survival Instincts"
2020	The Good Doctor	Vera	Episodes: "Hurt", "I Love You"
2020–2022	The Umbrella Academy	Sissy Cooper	11 episodes
2021	Y: The Last Man	Nora Brady	Main role
2022	Gaslit	Judy Hoback	2 episodes
2023	Justified: City Primeval	Maureen Downey	8 episodes
2024	Feud: Capote vs. The Swans	Katharine Graham	Episode: "Masquerade 1966"
2025	Dope Thief	Mina	Miniseries
2025	Devil in Disguise: John Wayne Gacy	Elizabeth Piest	8 episodes
2026	His & Hers	Zoe Harper	6 episodes
2026	The Bear	Sherri	Episode: "Gary"
2026	The Terror: Devil in Silver	'Dewey'	3 episodes

=== Theatre ===
Year	Title	Role	Playwright	Venue	Ref.
2000	Nocturne	Candice Brown	Adam Rapp	Hasty Pudding Theatre, (Cambridge, Massachusetts)	
2001	Nocturne	Candice Brown	Adam Rapp	New York Theatre Workshop (New York City)	
2002	Far Away	Joan	Caryl Churchill	New York Theatre Workshop (New York City)	
2005	Sabina	Sabina	Willy Holtzman	Primary Stages (New York City)	
2008	The Beebo Brinker Chronicles	Laura Chapman	Kate Moira Ryan; Linda S. Chapman	Fourth Street Theater (New York City)	
2008	Blasted	Cate	Sarah Kane	Soho Rep (New York City)	
2009	Reasons to Be Pretty	Steph	Neil LaBute	Lyceum Theatre (New York City)	
2009	After Miss Julie	Christine	Patrick Marber	American Airlines Theatre (New York City)	
2010	A Lie of the Mind	Beth	Sam Shepard	Acorn Theatre (New York City)	
2011	Three Sisters	Natasha	Anton Chekhov	Classic Stage Company (New York City)	
2011	Margaret and Craig	Margaret Gibson	David Solomon	Powerhouse Theater (New York City)	
2011	Maple and Vine	Katha	Jordan Harrison	Playwrights Horizons (New York City)	
2012	Marie Antoinette	Marie Antoinette	David Adjmi	Yale Repertory Theatre (New Haven, Connecticut)	
2012	Troilus and Cressida	Cressida	William Shakespeare	Swan Theatre (Stratford-upon-Avon, UK)	
2013	The Big Knife	Marion	Clifford Odets	American Airlines Theatre (New York City)	
2013	Marie Antoinette	Marie Antoinette	David Adjmi	Soho Rep (New York City)	
2015	Kill Floor	Andy	Abe Koogler	Claire Tow Theater, Lincoln Center (New York City)	
2016	Ironbound	Darja	Martyna Majok	Rattlestick Playwrights Theater (New York City)	
2017	On the Exhale	Woman	Martín Zimmerman	Black Box Theater (New York City)	
2018	Summer and Smoke	Alma Winemiller	Tennessee Williams	Classic Stage Company / Transport Group (New York City)	
2018	Blue Ridge	Alison	Abby Rosebrock	Atlantic Theater Company	
2019	Happy Talk	Ljuba	Jesse Eisenberg	The New Group	
2021	Morning Sun	Tessa	Simon Stephens	Manhattan Theatre Club	
2023	Uncle Vanya	Sonya	Anton Chekov	A private loft in Flatiron (New York City)	
2023	Spain	Helen	Jen Silverman	Second Stage / Tony Kiser Theater (New York City)	
2024	Pre-Existing Condition		Marin Ireland	Connolly Theater (New York City)	
2025	Queens	Renia	Martyna Majok	Manhattan Theatre Club / New York City Center Stage I	
2025	Ironbound	Darja	Martyna Majok	Ojai Theatre Festival (Ojai, California)	

== Accolades ==
Year	Association	Category	Work	Result	Ref.
2009	Tony Awards	Best Featured Actress in a Play	Reasons to Be Pretty	Nominated	
2009	Theatre World Award		Reasons to Be Pretty	Won	
2010	Outer Critics Circle Award	Outstanding Featured Actress in a Play	A Lie of the Mind	Nominated	
2015	Independent Spirit Awards	Best Supporting Female	Glass Chin	Nominated	
2017	Outer Critics Circle Award	Outstanding Solo Performance	On the Exhale	Nominated	
2019	Drama League Award	Distinguished Performance	Blue Ridge and Summer and Smoke	Nominated	
2019	Lucille Lortel Award	Outstanding Lead Actress in a Play	Blue Ridge	Nominated	
2020	Audie Awards	Best Female Narrator	Nothing to See Here	Won	
2020	Florida Film Critics Circle Awards	Pauline Kael Breakout Award	The Dark and the Wicked	Nominated	
2020	Sitges Film Festival Awards	Best Actress	The Dark and the Wicked	Special Mention	
2021	Fangoria Chainsaw Awards	Best Actress	The Dark and the Wicked	Nominated	
2022	Drama League Award	Distinguished Performance	Morning Sun	Nominated	
2023	Audie Awards	Audie Award for Audiobook of the Year	Remarkably Bright Creatures	Nominated	
2023	Independent Spirit Awards	Independent Spirit Award for Best Supporting Performance	Eileen	Nominated	
2025	Outer Critics Circle Award	John Gassner Award	Pre-Existing Condition	Nominated	
2026	Critics' Choice Television Awards	Best Supporting Actress in a Limited Series or Movie Made for Television	Devil in Disguise: John Wayne Gacy	Nominated	
2026	Lucille Lortel Awards	Outstanding Lead Performer in a Play	Queens	Nominated	
