= Urgent (American band) =

American melodic rock band (1984–1987)

- Origin: New York City, United States
- Genre: Rock
- Years active: 1984–1987
- Label: EMI-Manhattan
- Past members: Michael Kehr; Don Kehr; Steve Kehr; Yul Vazquez; Klyph Black

Urgent was an American melodic rock band from New York City featuring former and future members of Sterling, Vendetta and Diving for Pearls. Urgent founding member Donnie Kehr and guitarist Yul Vazquez have both gone on to highly successful stage, movie and television acting careers.

== Biography ==
Formed by brothers Michael (vocals, guitar), Don (vocals, keyboards) and Steve Kehr (drums), and rounded out by Miami native Yul Vazquez (lead guitar) and Klyph Black (bass), Urgent rose from the East Coast in the mid-1980s. Initially looked at by Epic Records, the band wound up signing with newly formed EMI subsidiary Manhattan Records and turned to British rock legends Ian Hunter and Mick Ronson for the production of their debut album.

Cast the First Stone was released in 1985 and became a minor success with the single "Running Back" peaking at No. 79 on the Billboard Hot 100. A second single off the album, "Love Can Make You Cry", was re-recorded for and featured on the successful Iron Eagle soundtrack album.

The 1987 Tom Allom produced follow-up album, Thinking Out Loud, which spawned the single/video "Can't Take It No More", was not a success and the band split up. Yul Vazquez, along with drummer Peter Clemente, would join former Plasmatics man Jean Beauvoir on his Drums Along the Mohawk tour before both joined Diving for Pearls whose eponymous debut album was released via Epic Records in 1989. Vazquez segued into an acting career starting in 1992 with the movie The Mambo Kings and had a memorable recurring role on Seinfeld between 1995 and '98 as Bob, The Intimidating Gay Guy. Vazquez was nominated for a 2011 Tony Award for "Best Featured Actor in a Play" for his role of Cousin Julio in The Motherfucker With the Hat.

Bassist Klyph Black was also a member of Detroit, MI power trio Vendetta, featuring guitarist/vocalist Nikki Buzz, whose Max Norman produced album was issued on Epic Records in 1982. Black, along with Peter Clemente, was part of the second incarnation of Secret Chiefs, a NY band put together by Hanoi Rocks frontman Michael Monroe. Black and Clemente both appear on Monroe's 1987 debut solo album, Nights Are So Long. Black was a long-time member of the Grateful Dead cover band Zen Tricksters and can now be found in the bands Black & Sparrow, Jam Stampede and Rumor Has It.

Michael and Steve Kehr were members of pop rock band Sterling who released the album City Kids, produced by David Kershenbaum, on A&M Records in 1980. Don Kehr would contribute backing vocals to the 1989 Hunter/Ronson album YUI Orta as well as to Ian Hunter's Artful Dodger album in 1996. He also rekindled his Broadway career, having made his Broadway debut at age 12, co-starring with F. Murray Abraham in Legend in 1976. In 2005, he released the solo album Shift. Kehr can be seen as Norm Waxman in Clint Eastwood's 2014 movie adaptation of Jersey Boys.

After the demise of Urgent in 1987, Michael Kehr formed the short lived The Michael Kehr Project before retiring from music and turning his focus on family. He resurfaced in 2008 and began writing new songs and working with producer Mark DeSimone. Shortly afterwards, he reunited with brother Donnie and the two have since written new music together, including the song "Falling".

== Band members ==
- Michael Kehr - lead and background vocals, rhythm guitar
- Don Kehr - lead and background vocals, piano, keyboards
- Steve Kehr - drums, percussion, background vocals
- Yul Vazquez - lead and rhythm guitar
- Klyph Black - bass

== Discography ==
=== Studio albums ===
| Title | Album details |
|---|---|
| Cast the First Stone | Released: 1985; Label: Manhattan; Formats: LP, CD |
| Thinking Out Loud | Released: 1987; Label: Manhattan; Formats: LP, CD |

=== Singles ===
| Single | Year | Positions | Album |
| Single | Year | US | Album |
|---|---|---|---|
| "Running Back" | 1985 | 79 | Cast the First Stone |
| "Love Can Make You Cry" | 1985 | — | Iron Eagle soundtrack |
| "I Can't Take It No More" | 1987 | — | Thinking Out Loud |
"—" denotes a recording that did not chart or was not released in that territory.
