= Bringing Rain =

- Bringing Rain poster
- Directed by: Noah Buschel
- Written by: Noah Buschel
- Produced by: Belladonna Productions
- Starring: Adrian Grenier; Niesha Butler; Ryan Donowho
- Cinematography: Yaron Orbach
- Edited by: Pax Wassermann
- Music by: Mark Wike
- Distributed by: Plexifilm
- Release date: 2003
- Running time: 82 minutes
- Country: United States
- Language: English
- Budget: $150,000

Bringing Rain is a 2003 American independent drama film written and directed by Noah Buschel. It premiered at the 2003 Tribeca Film Festival and was released on DVD on September 20, 2005. It won first prize at the Rhode Island International Film Festival for directorial debut.

== Plot ==
A car accident involving baseball star Clay Askins (Grenier) and his swimmer girlfriend Neisha Sanders (Butler) indirectly affects the lives of a small group of students living at a New Jersey boarding school.

== Cast ==
- Adrian Grenier as Clay Askins
- Niesha Butler as Neisha Sanders
- Merritt Wever as Monica Greenfield
- Paz de la Huerta as Dakota Cunningham
- Ryan Donowho as Atlee Surnamer
- Larisa Oleynik as Ori Swords
- Noah Fleiss as Marcus Swords
- Rodrigo Lopresti as Reb Babbitt
- Ray Santiago as John Bell
- Alexis Dziena as Lysee Key
- Olek Krupa as Headmaster Gula
- Val Emmich as Prentiss Bergen
- Nathalie Paulding as Mu
