= Ryan Donowho =

American actor, musician (b. 1980)

- Born: Ryan Wayne Donowho; September 20, 1980 (age 45); Houston, Texas, U.S.
- Occupations: Actor, musician
- Years active: 1998–present

Ryan Wayne Donowho (born September 20, 1980) is an American actor and musician.

== Early life ==
Born and raised in Houston, Texas, Donowho appeared as an uncredited extra in Varsity Blues, a film shot in his home state of Texas. Donowho moved to Brooklyn, New York and then to Los Angeles. He was a street musician in New York City as a "bucket" drummer. Donowho was bucket drumming in New York City when he was discovered by a modeling agent. He has an older brother, Matthew and a younger brother, Joseph.

== Career ==
His official movie debut was in 2001's The Car Thief and the Hit Man. Donowho co-starred alongside Emile Hirsch in The Mudge Boy. In 2003 he was featured as the drummer for a song in The Hermitt's "& The Story of The Insects". Donowho is known for his work in 2004's Imaginary Heroes with Emile Hirsch. In the film, Donowho plays a sexually ambiguous character.

Donowho's roles in Imaginary Heroes and later in A Home at the End of the World created for Donowho a positive relationship with the gay community. He appeared with brother Matthew at the 2004 Outfest, a gay and lesbian film festival held annually in Los Angeles along with the cast and crew of A Home at the End of the World. He appeared in Bringing Rain with Rodrigo Lopresti and Alexis Dziena. For the third season of The O.C., the producers cast Donowho as Johnny Harper. Donowho played Stanley in the 2006 film adaptation of Strangers With Candy but does not appear in the released version of the film.

Donowho appeared in the thriller film Altitude. He played the lead character of Nathan in Rites of Passage.

== Filmography ==
=== Film ===
Film roles
Year	Title	Role	Notes
1999	Varsity Blues	Football Fan	Uncredited
2001	The Car Thief and the Hit Man	Car Thief	Short film
2003	The Mudge Boy	Scotty	
2003	Rhythm of the Saints	Zane	
2003	Bringing Rain	Atlee Surnamer	
2004	A Home at the End of the World	Carlton Morrow	
2004	Imaginary Heroes	Kyle Dwyer	Also wrote and performed "Drug Day Afternoon" (soundtrack)
2005	Strangers with Candy	Stanley	Uncredited
2005	Broken Flowers	Young Man on Bus	
2006	In From the Night	Snakeman	TV movie
2006	The Favor	Johnny	
2007	Sleepwalkers	Drummer who works as Bicycle Messenger	Short film
2007	The Pacific and Eddy	Eddy	Also served as co-producer
2007	Flakes	Skinny Larry	
2008	Cook County	Abe	Also served as producer
2009	Bandslam	Basher Martin	
2010	Prime of Your Life	Keith	Also served as co-producer
2010	Altitude	Cory	
2011	Blood Out	David Savion	Direct-to-video
2011	Grief, a Comedy	Voice of Ex-Boyfriend	Short film
2011	Rites of Passage	Nathan	
2012	Hated	Mike	
2012	Transit	Evers	
2012	Soldiers of Fortune	Ernesto	
2013	Chlorine	Henry	
2013	Salvation U.S.A.	Vincent 'Vinnie' Randolph Vanatta	
2014	Cabin Fever: Patient Zero	Dobs	
2014	The Ganzfelf Haunting	Elliot	
2014	In Love and War		Short film
2015	Weepah Way for Now	Syd	
2018	High Voltage	Scott	
2018	Faith	Leo	Short film
2019	Inside the Rain	Shawn	
2021	Beyond Paranormal	Ray	
2023	Trim Season	Malcolm	
2023	Beyond Paranormal: Director's Cut	Ray	
TBA	Art of a Hit	Ryan	

=== Television ===
Television roles
Year	Title	Role	Notes
2005–06	The O.C.	Johnny Harper	Recurring (Season 3)
2006	Skwod	Seth (voice)	TV Pilot
2020	Agents of S.H.I.E.L.D.	Cricket	Episode: "The Totally Excellent Adventures of Mack and The D"

== Awards ==
Donowho is the recipient of several awards; he was awarded twice for his role in the 2006 film The Favor at the San Diego Film Festival, receiving the Festival Award, and the Achievement in Acting Award, both for Best Actor. For his portrayal in the 2016 film Salvation, he was received the award for Best Actor at the Los Angeles Cinema Festival of Hollywood.
