= Iron Eagle (soundtrack) =

1986 album by various artists

Iron Eagle: Original Motion Picture Soundtrack is the soundtrack for the TriStar Pictures film Iron Eagle, released on July 23, 1986, by Capitol Records. A separate film score by Basil Poledouris titled Iron Eagle: Original Motion Picture Score was released on July 9, 2008 by Varèse Sarabande.

The soundtrack itself peaked on the Billboard top 200 album chart at position #54 in late March 1986, and features its only song that charted, "One Vision" by Queen, a minor hit pop single (position #61) on the Billboard Hot 100 and #19 hit on the Album Rock Tracks chart.

== Iron Eagle: Original Motion Picture Soundtrack ==
Iron Eagle: Original Motion Picture Soundtrack

Soundtrack album by Various artists
- Released: July 23, 1986
- Genres: Hard rock; glam metal; Heavy metal
- Length: 40:30
- Label: Capitol

Professional ratings
Review scores
Source	Rating
AllMusic	2/5 stars

=== Track listing ===
Side A
No.	Title	Writer(s)	Performer	Length
1.	"One Vision"	Queen	Queen	4:03
2.	"Iron Eagle (Never Say Die)"	Jake Hooker; Duane Hitchings	King Kobra	3:33
3.	"These Are the Good Times"	Myles Hunter	Eric Martin	3:48
4.	"Maniac House"	Kimberley Rew	Katrina and the Waves	4:54
5.	"Intense"	George Clinton	George Clinton	4:34

Side B
No.	Title	Writer(s)	Performer	Length
1.	"Hide in the Rainbow"	Ronnie James Dio	Dio	3:58
2.	"It's Too Late"	Paul Hackman; J. Dexter	Helix	3:08
3.	"Road of the Gypsy"	Adrenalin	Adrenalin	4:29
4.	"Love Can Make You Cry"	Michael Kehr; Don Kehr; I. Hunter	Urgent	4:20
5.	"This Raging Fire"	Bob Halligan Jr.	Jon Butcher Axis	4:10

=== Not included in the album ===
The following songs were featured in the film, but not included in the soundtrack album:

1. "Old Enough to Rock and Roll" by Rainey Haynes
2. "Gimme Some Lovin'" by The Spencer Davis Group
3. "Eyes of the World" by Eric Martin
4. "We're Not Gonna Take It" by Twisted Sister
5. "Proud Mary" by Ike & Tina Turner
6. "There Was a Time" by James Brown

=== Music video ===
A music video for King Kobra's "Iron Eagle (Never Say Die)" was made to promote the film. The video features Louis Gossett Jr. reprising his role as Col. "Chappy" Sinclair, who has the band cut their hair and undergo boot camp training for them to prove themselves as pilots.

== Iron Eagle: Original Motion Picture Score ==
Iron Eagle: Original Motion Picture Score

Soundtrack album by Basil Poledouris
- Released: June 30, 2008
- Genre: Film score
- Length: 52:11
- Label: Varèse Sarabande
- Producer: Basil Poledouris

Basil Poledouris chronology
Flesh and Blood (1985)	Iron Eagle: Original Motion Picture Score (2008)	RoboCop (1987)

=== Track listing ===
All music is composed by Basil Poledouris, except where indicated.

No.	Title	Music	Length
1.	"Iron Eagle - Main Title"		1:59
2.	"Shot Down"		1:15
3.	"Hallway"		1:41
4.	"Ted on Trial"		1:28
5.	"Three Days/Minister Sinister"		2:37
6.	"The Gallows/Flight Line I"		3:33
7.	"Chappy's Story/Appetite"		3:30
8.	"Iron Eagle Story/Flight Line II/The Coast"		4:12
9.	"Chappy Gets Hit/Chappy Crashes/Chappy Talks"		4:16
10.	"Ted To Tarmac/The Tower"		2:26
11.	"Doug and Dad"		2:41
12.	"Think You Can Handle the Music?"		2:49
13.	"Missing Man/You've Earned Them"		2:29
14.	"Three Days/Mister Sinister" (Alternates)		3:54
15.	"Flight Line I" (Alternate)		2:25
16.	"Flight Line II" (Alternate)		0:54
17.	"Chappy Talks" (Alternate)		1:49
18.	"Slappy's Place" (Source Music)		4:25
19.	"Slo-Slappy" (Source Music)		1:29
20.	"Army Air Corps" (Source Music)	Robert MacArthur Crawford	2:19
Total length:			52:11
