= Matt Ross (actor) =

American actor (born 1970)

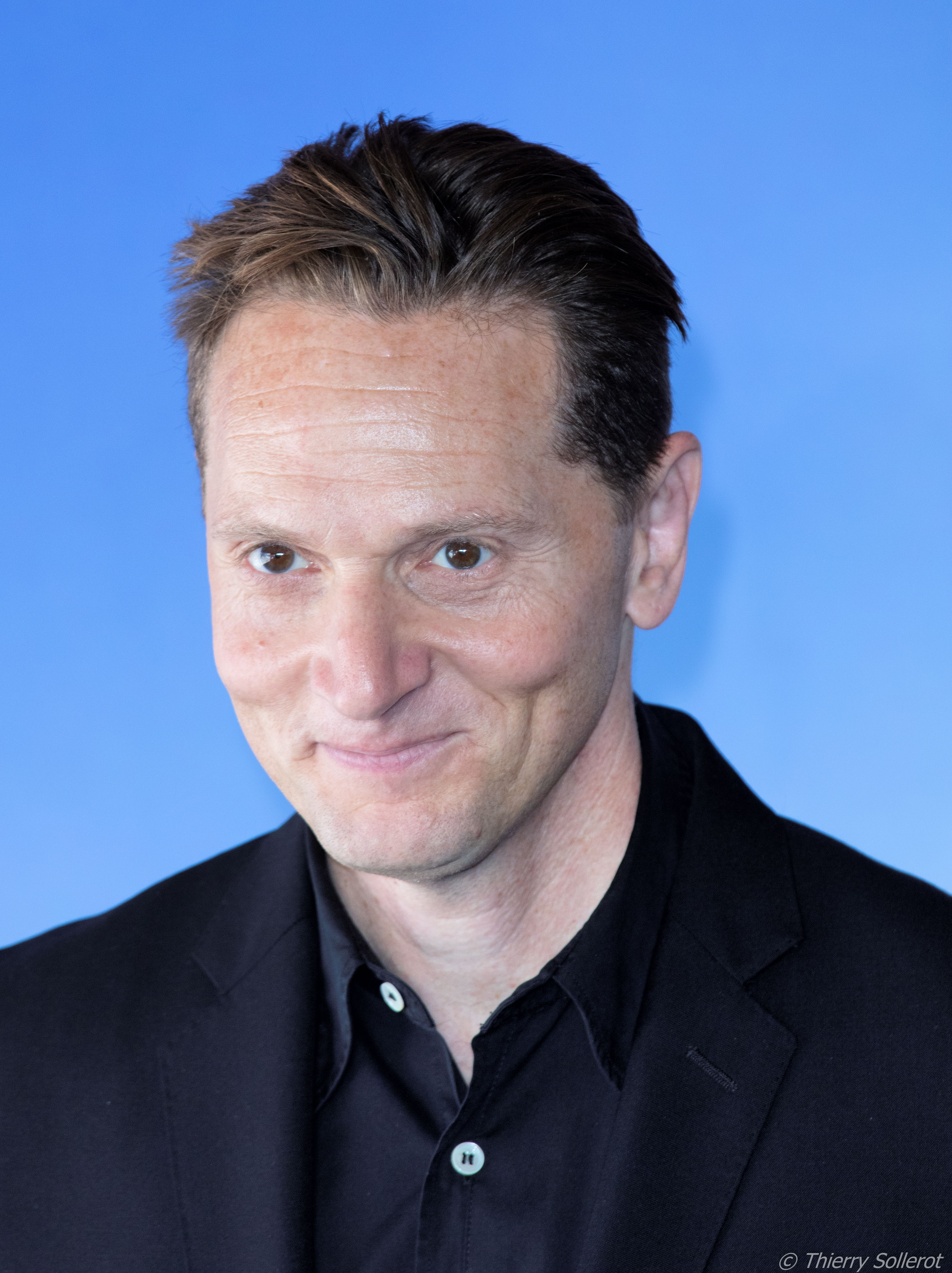
- Ross in September 2016
- Born: Matthew Brandon Ross; January 3, 1970 (age 56); Greenwich, Connecticut, U.S.
- Occupations: Actor; director; screenwriter
- Years active: 1989–present
- Spouse: Phyllis Grant (m. 2001)
- Children: 2

Matthew Brandon Ross (born January 3, 1970) is an American actor and filmmaker. He is known for his roles as Alby Grant on the television series Big Love (2006–11) and Gavin Belson on Silicon Valley (2014–19), as well as his performances in the films The Last Days of Disco (1998), American Psycho (2000), and The Aviator (2004). He wrote and directed the 2016 comedy-drama film Captain Fantastic.

== Early life and education ==
Ross was born on January 3, 1970 in Greenwich, Connecticut, and grew up in Eagle Point, Oregon. His parents divorced when he was young, and Ross was raised in what he described as "alternative living situations". These experiences partly inspired his 2016 film Captain Fantastic. His mother became interested in the Waldorf education philosophy and Ross spent time in England while his mother worked towards a teaching credential in Waldorf education.

== Career ==
Ross garnered critical acclaim for his role as Alby Grant in the HBO series Big Love for five seasons. He also played Eddie Scott in the 2005 film Good Night, and Good Luck, for which he was nominated for a Screen Actors Guild Award for Outstanding Performance by a Cast in a Motion Picture. In 2011 and 2015, he played Charles Montgomery in the first and fifth seasons of FX's anthology series American Horror Story.

His feature film directorial debut, 28 Hotel Rooms, premiered at the Sundance Film Festival in 2012. Before that, Ross made seven short films, including The Language of Love, which premiered at a prior Sundance festival. Ross subsequently wrote and directed the feature film Captain Fantastic, starring Viggo Mortensen, for which he won the Un Certain Regard Prize for Best Director at the 2016 Cannes Film Festival. Mortensen's performance in the film earned multiple accolades, including an Academy Award nomination for Best Actor.

== Personal life ==
He is married to the writer Phyllis Grant, with whom he has two children: Isabel "Bella" and Dashiell "Dash" Ross.

== Filmography ==
=== Film ===
Short film

Year	Title	Director	Writer	Producer	Notes
1997	The Language of Love	Yes	Yes	Yes	
2009	Human Resources	Yes	Yes	Yes	Also editor and cinematographer

Feature film

Year	Title	Director	Writer
2012	28 Hotel Rooms	Yes	Yes
2016	Captain Fantastic	Yes	Yes
TBA	Kockroach	Yes	No

Acting roles

Year	Title	Role
1993	Little Cory Gory	Larry
1994	PCU	Raji
1995	12 Monkeys	Bee
1996	Ed's Next Move	Eddie Brodsky
1997	Face/Off	Agent Loomis
1997	Buffalo Soldiers	Captain Calhoun
1998	You Are Here	Kid in Grocery Store
1998	Homegrown	Ben Hickson
1998	The Last Days of Disco	Dan Powers
1999	Pushing Tin	Ron Hewitt
2000	American Psycho	Luis Carruthers
2000	Company Man	Danny
2001	Just Visiting	Hunter Cassidy
2001	Dust	Stitch
2003	Down with Love	J.B.
2004	The Aviator	Glenn Odekirk
2005	Good Night, and Good Luck	Eddie Scott
2006	Last Holiday	Mr. Adamian
2007	Turn the River	David Sullivan

=== Television ===
Year	Title	Director	Executive Producer	Notes
2018–2019	Silicon Valley	Yes	No	2 episodes
2022	Gaslit	Yes	Yes	Miniseries
2025	Death by Lightning	Yes	Yes	Miniseries

Acting roles

Year	Title	Role	Notes
1997	Party of Five	Aaron Hughes	Episode: "Life's Too Short"
1997	Oz	Officer Anthony Nowakowski	Episode: "A Game of Checkers"
1997	A Deadly Vision	The Killer	Television film
1999	Third Watch	Leonard	Episode: "History of the World"
2002	Stephen King's Rose Red	Emery Waterman	3 episodes
2003	Touched by an Angel	Pete	Episode: "The Root of All Evil"
2003	Six Feet Under	Daniel Showalter	Episode: "You Never Know"
2003	Just Shoot Me!	Adam	Episode: "My Fair Finchy"
2005	Bones	Neil Meredith	Episode: "The Girl in the Fridge"
2006	CSI: Miami	Paul Burton	Episode: "Silencer"
2006	Invasion	Vince	Episode: "The Fittest"
2006	Numb3rs	Joel Hellman	Episode: "Provenance"
2006–2011	Big Love	Alby Grant	49 episodes
2010	CSI: Crime Scene Investigation	Charlie DiMasa	Episodes: "Irradiator" and "Meat Jekyll"
2011	American Horror Story: Murder House	Charles Montgomery	6 episodes
2012–2013	Magic City	Jack Klein	14 episodes
2013	Revolution	Titus Andover	4 episodes
2013	Ring of Fire	Johnny Cash	Television film
2014–2019	Silicon Valley	Gavin Belson	37 episodes
2015	American Horror Story: Hotel	Charles Montgomery	Episode: "Room 33"

== Awards and honors ==
Year	Title	Award	Result
2016	Captain Fantastic	Deauville American Film Festival Jury Prize	Won
2016	Captain Fantastic	Deauville American Film Festival Audience Award	Won
2016	Captain Fantastic	Cannes Film Festival Un Certain Regard Best Director	Won
2016	Captain Fantastic	Seattle International Film Festival Golden Space Needle Audience Award – Best Film	Won
2016	Captain Fantastic	Variety's "Ten Directors to Watch 2016"	Honor
2016	Captain Fantastic	Nantucket Film Festival Audience Award for Best Narrative Feature	2nd Place
2016	Captain Fantastic	Karlovy Vary International Film Festival Pravo Audience Award	Won
2016	Captain Fantastic	Rome Film Festival People's Choice Award	Won
