= Incarnation Catholic School =

Catholic school in Sarasota, Florida

Coordinates: 28.0114078°N 82.5659302°W

Information
- Religious affiliation: Catholicism
- Established: 1961; 65 years ago

Incarnation School is a Catholic school in Sarasota, Florida. It was founded in 1961, and moved into the current building in 1962. In 1964 four Sisters of St. Francis from the Chicago Province arrived at the school and lay teachers were added to the staff as needed. In 1989 two Sisters of Notre Dame became part-time faculty with two Sisters of Mercy joining the staff in 2001. Today the school has all lay teachers. ActivBoards were installed in every classroom in 2007 and a security system with 16 cameras was installed to monitor the campus 24/7. In 2008, Incarnation Catholic School was recognized as a Blue Ribbon School by the United States Department of Education.

== See also ==
- Diocese of Venice in Florida
