= Sparrows Dance =

- Directed by: Noah Buschel
- Screenplay by: Noah Buschel
- Produced by: Samantha Housman; Louisa Runge
- Starring: Marin Ireland; Paul Sparks
- Cinematography: Ryan Samul
- Edited by: Brett Jutkiewicz
- Production company: OneZero Productions
- Distributed by: Tribeca Film
- Release dates: October 5, 2012 (Hamptons Int'l Film Festival); August 23, 2013 (United States)
- Running time: 81 minutes
- Country: United States
- Language: English
- Budget: $175,000

Sparrows Dance is a 2012 American independent romantic drama film written and directed by Noah Buschel and starring Marin Ireland and Paul Sparks. It premiered at the 2012 Hamptons International Film Festival.

== Plot ==
An agoraphobic actress goes about her unchanging daily routine alone in her New York City apartment, until an overflowing toilet forces her to call in a plumber to fix the leak. Her interactions with the chatty, sweet, saxophone-playing plumber lead her to consider changing her repetitive life.

== Cast ==
- Marin Ireland as Woman In Apartment
- Paul Sparks as Wes

== Production ==
The film was initially going to star Martha Plimpton and John Ortiz, but Plimpton left the project when her television show, Raising Hope, was picked up. Ortiz knew Marin Ireland from a theater workshop, and suggested her to Buschel. Ortiz dropped out once he was cast in the HBO show Luck, at which point Sparks was cast.

Buschel intended to make a film with a low budget that wasn't a typical mumblecore film with handheld camerawork and amateur actors. Many scenes play out in long takes, which is a primary reason Buschel cast actors with theater experience. He chose to shoot the film in a 4:3 aspect ratio, keeping Ireland front and center to emphasize her closed-off life. The film was shot in nine days and takes place almost entirely in one location, with a number of visual flourishes. "I Love U So" by Cassius plays over the end credits.

Paul Sparks based his performance of Wes, the saxophone playing plumber with stage fright, on comedian Mitch Hedberg, who suffered from stage fright.

== Release ==
The film premiered at the 2012 Hamptons International Film Festival. It was picked up by Tribeca Film and released on VOD on August 20, 2013, and theatrically on August 23, 2013.

Buschel wrote about Tribeca Film's homogenized trailer for Sparrows Dance in the essay "A Strange Baby in the Machine".

== Reception ==
The film was named Best Narrative Feature at the 2012 Austin Film Festival.

On the film-critics aggregator Rotten Tomatoes, it has a positive rating of 92 percent based on 12 critics, with an average of 7.6/10. IndieWire gave the film an A, calling it "one of the year's best films" and the lead performances "outstanding" and "pitch-perfect," Buschel's direction "inventive" and the ending "brightly triumphant." The Village Voice called it "a genuine romance between two refreshingly authentic people." The Hollywood Reporter called it a "charmingly quirky love story" with "deeply affecting performances by the two leads." Moveable Fest wrote "there are just two characters on one set in Buschel’s follow-up to the Michael Shannon-Amy Ryan underseen detective story The Missing Person, and yet in telling the spare story of a young woman (Marin Ireland) who sequesters herself to a small New York flat after experiencing a debilitating fear of the outside world, the filmmaker is able to create a rather grand romance. The real beauty of Sparrows Dance is seeing all the artifice of its movie trappings fall away, a construction that Buschel asks the audience to confront directly in a slow dance scene that reminds us all at once of both the fiction and the fact that magic can exist onscreen." . The New York Post called it "a pure love story, told with elegance and simplicity." Even details where praised like Farran Smith Nehme, from New York Post, who said: "Given that the opening shot shows the heroine on the toilet, what a nice surprise to find that this is a pure love story, told with elegance and simplicity on a low budget."
