= Kevin Wilson (writer) =

American writer

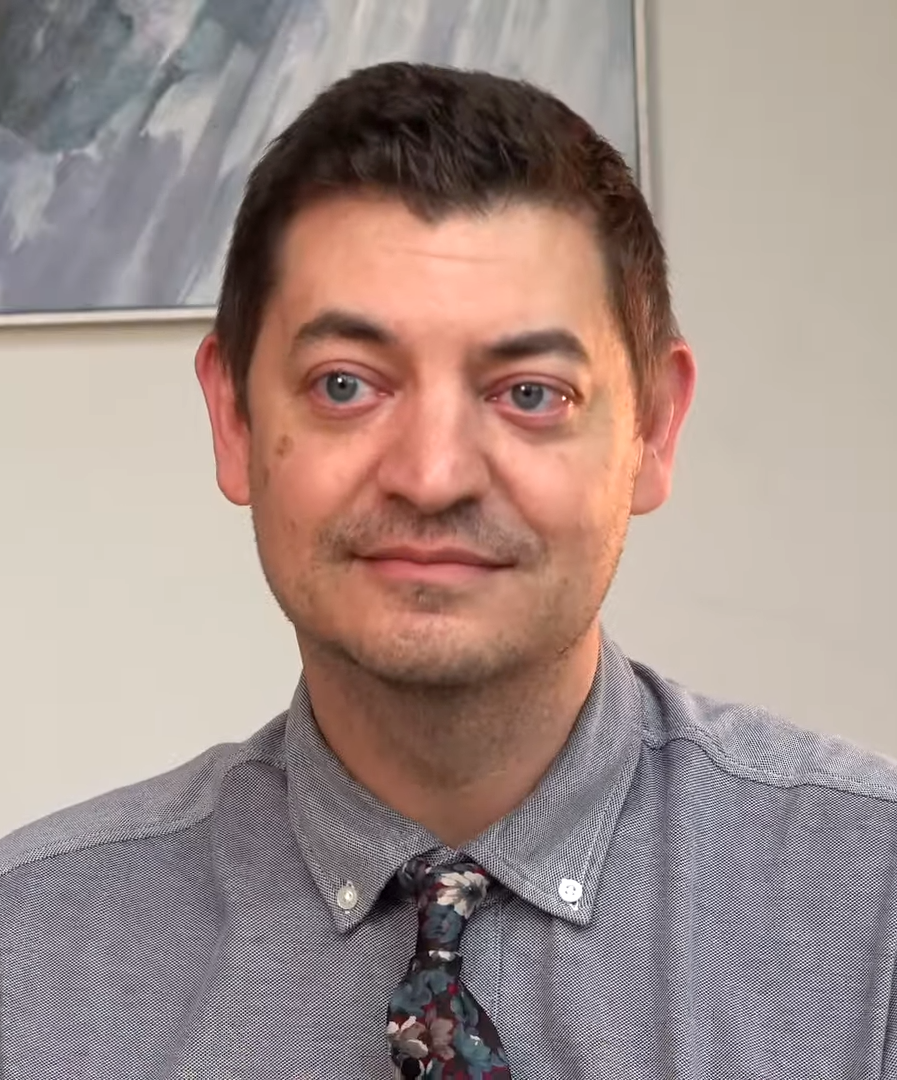
Wilson in 2022

Kevin Wilson is an American writer from Sewanee, Tennessee. His stories have been published in Ploughshares, Tin House, One Story, and The Cincinnati Review. They have also been included in four volumes of the New Stories from the South: The Year's Best anthology. His short story "Kennedy" was included in The Best American Short Stories 2020.

Wilson is a graduate of the MFA program at the University of Florida. He teaches writing at Sewanee: The University of the South. He is married to fellow poet Leigh Anne Couch; they have two sons.

== Published works and awards won ==
- Tunneling to the Center of the Earth (2009): won the Alex Award from the American Library Association and the Shirley Jackson Award.
- The Family Fang (2011)
- Perfect Little World (2017)
- Baby, You're Gonna Be Mine (2018)
- Nothing to See Here (2019)
- Now is Not the Time to Panic (2022)
- Run for the Hills (2025)
