= Noah Buschel =

American film director and screenwriter

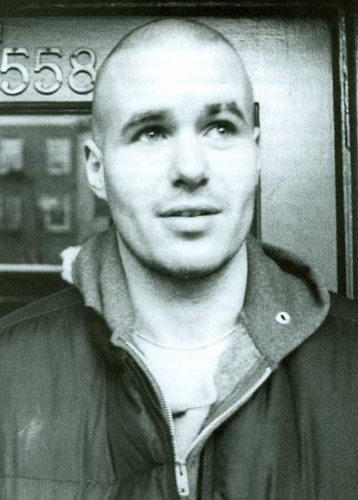
- Born: 1978 (age 47–48); Philadelphia, Pennsylvania, U.S.
- Occupations: Film director, screenwriter
- Years active: 2003–present

Noah Buschel (born 1978) is an American film director and screenwriter.

== Early life ==
Buschel was born in Philadelphia and grew up in the Greenwich Village neighborhood of Manhattan, New York City.

== Career ==
Buschel's first film, Bringing Rain, premiered at the 2003 Tribeca Film Festival. His second film, Neal Cassady, was distributed by IFC. His third, The Missing Person, premiered at the 2009 Sundance Film Festival and was distributed theatrically by Strand Releasing. It earned Buschel a 2009 Gotham Awards nomination for Breakthrough Director. He has collaborated with cinematographer Ryan Samul on four movies: The Missing Person, Sparrows Dance, Glass Chin and The Phenom. Matt Prigge of Metro New York wrote that, "Noah Buschel might be one of indies' most interesting filmmakers, all the more so because he doesn't belong to any easily promotable group or even genre."

Buschel was a contributing editor for Tricycle: The Buddhist Review and ordained as a Zen priest by Enkyo Pat O'Hara. As an essayist for Filmmaker Magazine. His topics have included gun violence in films.

== Filmography ==
Year	Title	Credited as	Notes
2003	Bringing Rain	Writer, director	Premiered at Tribeca Film Festival
2007	Neal Cassady	Writer, director	Distributed by IFC
2009	The Missing Person	Writer, director	Premiered at Sundance Film Festival and distributed by Strand Releasing
2013	Sparrows Dance	Writer, director	Won Best Narrative Feature at the 2012 Austin Film Festival
2014	Glass Chin	Writer, director	Distributed by Entertainment One
2015	The Phenom	Writer, director	Distributed by RLJ Entertainment
2020	The Man in the Woods	Writer, director	Starring Marin Ireland and William Jackson Harper
