= Where There's a Will (Big Love) =

- Big Love episode
- Episode no.: Season 1 Episode 11
- Directed by: Alan Poul
- Story by: Eileen Myers
- Teleplay by: Mimi Friedman; Jeanette Collins
- Cinematography by: James Glennon
- Editing by: Carole Kravetz
- Original release date: May 21, 2006
- Running time: 53 minutes

Guest appearances
- Mary Kay Place as Adaleen Grant; Matt Ross as Alby Grant; Tina Majorino as Heather Tuttle

Episode chronology
← Previous "The Baptism"	Next → "The Ceremony"

"Where There's a Will" is the eleventh episode of the American drama television series Big Love. The episode was written by supervising producers Mimi Friedman and Jeanette Collins from a story by Eileen Myers, and directed by Alan Poul. It originally aired on HBO on May 21, 2006.

The series is set in Salt Lake City and follows Bill Henrickson, a fundamentalist Mormon. He practices polygamy, having Barbara, Nicki and Margie as his wives. The series charts the family's life in and out of the public sphere in their suburb, as well as their associations with a fundamentalist compound in the area. In the episode, Bill contemplates joining a prestigious club, while his wives argue over their wills.

According to Nielsen Media Research, the episode was seen by an estimated 4.10 million household viewers. The episode received positive reviews from critics, who praised the character development and performances.

== Plot ==
Barbara (Jeanne Tripplehorn), Nicki (Chloë Sevigny) and Margie (Ginnifer Goodwin) discuss their wills, as Barbara wants to change hers to grant them custody of her kids if she dies. While Margie is touched by the gesture, Nicki decides to visit her lawyer to change her will, wanting her kids to live with her parents in Juniper Creek instead.

Bill Henrickson (Bill Paxton) is contacted by the Salt Lake Leadership League, a country club that invites prestigious businessmen. While Bill is excited to join and enjoy some benefits, Don (Joel McKinnon Miller) is scared that he might get exposed. Bill continues working with Ernest (John Ingle) in exposing Roman (Harry Dean Stanton). Barbara, Nicki and Margie soon get into an argument when they realize they have all changed their respective wills, alienating themselves. Ben (Ben Smith) starts avoiding Brynn (Sarah Jones), prompting her to confront him at school practice. They make up, although their encounter is interrupted when Nicki and Margie come to pick him up. As she prepares to receive the "Mother of the Year" award, Barbara questions Bill over living a lie, but Bill tells her the award means the same.

Rhonda (Daveigh Chase) stays with the Henricksons as she competes at a local drama representation. Sarah (Amanda Seyfried) and Heather (Tina Majorino) help her in rehearsing, although Heather is disgusted by her relationship to Roman. They accompany her to the competition, but Rhonda is disqualified on the first round. Roman and Alby (Matt Ross) discover Ernest's collaboration with Bill, and they brutally attack him and exile him for his actions. Wendy (Jodie Markell) enters Bill's office for a file, and is surprised when she stumbles into Nicki's and Margie's files. Privately, she starts investigating them, finding a connection through Roman.

Bill continues contemplating the League's offer, now with his wives asking him to turn it down. He tells Don that he changed his will, and asks him to take care of his children if he dies, which he gladly accepts. As Barbara makes amends with Nicki, Margie surprises them by revealing she is pregnant. Bill helps Ernest and his family in leaving the state, with Ernest warning him that Roman will fight back against Bill for taking his place at the UEB Priesthood Council. Bill returns home, where he calls the League to inform that he is turning down the offer. As Margie joins him, Bill touches her stomach.

== Production ==
=== Development ===
The episode was written by supervising producers Mimi Friedman and Jeanette Collins from a story by Eileen Myers, and directed by Alan Poul. This was Friedman's second writing credit, Collins' second writing credit, Myers' second writing credit, and Poul's first directing credit.

== Reception ==
=== Viewers ===
In its original American broadcast, "Where There's a Will" was seen by an estimated 4.10 million household viewers. This was a 7% increase in viewership from the previous episode, which was watched by an estimated 3.80 million household viewers.

=== Critical reviews ===
"Where There's a Will" received positive reviews from critics. Michael Peck of TV Guide wrote that by this point, "Big Love's getting good."

Michael Sciannamea of TV Squad wrote, "It's getting harder and harder to watch this show without feeling more contempt for Bill Henrickson. He is a hypocrite to the nth degree - he fancies himself as a pious and moral man who wants to become a benefactor to others, but he also is a lying sack of s**t who can't deal with the truth about himself." Television Without Pity gave the episode a "B+" grade.
