= The Writing on the Wall (Big Love) =

- Big Love episode
- Episode no.: Season 2 Episode 2
- Directed by: Sarah Pia Anderson
- Written by: Mark V. Olsen; Will Scheffer
- Cinematography by: M. David Mullen
- Editing by: Meg Reticker; Stephen Prime
- Original release date: June 18, 2007
- Running time: 50 minutes

Guest appearances
- Mary Kay Place as Adaleen Grant; Jodie Markell as Wendy Hunt; Tina Majorino as Heather Tuttle; Aaron Paul as Scott Quittman; Sarah Jones as Brynn

Episode chronology
← Previous "Damage Control"	Next → "Reunion"

"The Writing on the Wall" is the second episode of the second season of the American drama television series Big Love. It is the fourteenth overall episode of the series and was written by series creators Mark V. Olsen and Will Scheffer, and directed by Sarah Pia Anderson. It originally aired on HBO on June 18, 2007.

The series is set in Salt Lake City and follows Bill Henrickson, a fundamentalist Mormon. He practices polygamy, having Barbara, Nicki and Margie as his wives. The series charts the family's life in and out of the public sphere in their suburb, as well as their associations with a fundamentalist compound in the area. In the episode, Bill faces challengers when he finds a vandalized billboard, while Joey tries to protect his wife.

According to Nielsen Media Research, the episode was seen by an estimated 1.53 million household viewers and gained a 0.8/2 ratings share among adults aged 18–49. The episode received mixed reviews from critics, who criticized Bill's storyline and pacing.

== Plot ==
Bill Henrickson (Bill Paxton) puts up many Home Plus billboards across the city as promotion. However, while being driven by Ben (Douglas Smith), he discovers that someone vandalized the billboard to include his polygamy rumors. Bill, Don (Joel McKinnon Miller) and Peg (Wendy Phillips) quickly dispatch a team to clean it up, but worry that the billboard may impact their business.

Barbara (Jeanne Tripplehorn) decides to begin taking classes at the University of Utah to earn a master's degree. Nicki (Chloë Sevigny) and Margie (Ginnifer Goodwin) reluctantly visit Juniper Creek when Wanda (Melora Walters) calls them for help in her case. Joey (Shawn Doyle) is also forced to become a pawn for Roman (Harry Dean Stanton), willing to risk his life to save his wife from prison. However, Alby (Matt Ross) is angry when Roman tells him he will not seek retaliation for his poisoning. Secretly, Alby meets with the police to incriminate Wanda.

While Bill and Barbara have an encounter in his office, they are called by Margie, who tells them that Nicki is angry as they forgot her wedding anniversary. This forces them to quickly prepare a party at home, just as Ben brings Brynn (Sarah Jones) to introduce her to the family. Ben has already revealed the family's polygamy, and Brynn accepts it. Barbara is also confronted by an injured Wendy (Jodie Markell), accusing the Henricksons of staging her car crash, but Barbara denies anything. When Nicki returns, Barbara apologizes for forgetting her anniversary, and they reconcile. Back at Juniper Creek, the police arrives to arrest Wanda. Joey steps outside, and declares himself as the real culprit, leading to his arrest.

== Production ==
=== Development ===
The episode was written by series creators Mark V. Olsen and Will Scheffer, and directed by Sarah Pia Anderson. This was Olsen's tenth writing credit, Scheffer's tenth writing credit, and Anderson's first directing credit.

== Reception ==
=== Viewers ===
In its original American broadcast, "The Writing on the Wall" was seen by an estimated 1.53 million household viewers with a 0.8/2 in the 18–49 demographics. This means that 0.8 percent of all households with televisions watched the episode, while 2 percent of all of those watching television at the time of the broadcast watched it. This was a 31% decrease in viewership from the previous episode, which was watched by an estimated 2.21 million household viewers with a 1.1/3 in the 18–49 demographics.

=== Critical reviews ===
"The Writing on the Wall" received mixed reviews from critics. Dan Iverson of IGN gave the episode an "okay" 6.8 out of 10 rating and wrote, ""The Writing on the Wall" may not have been the best episode of Big Love that we have ever seen, but the show continued to show the quality of writing and acting that continues to pull us in - even when there are glaring problems to be found within an episode. So, gripes aside, this episode was still worth viewing for those interested in the lives of the Henricksons... just be warned that this isn't the program's best effort."

Trish Wethman of TV Guide wrote, "Things definitely heated up this week for the Henrickson clan. After last week's slow-moving debut, I was excited to see all the cards falling into place for some interesting developments. Unfortunately for Bill and the ladies, it's definitely not all good news." Emma Pearse of Vulture wrote, "Here's why Big Love is one of the most exasperating shows on television: It builds and it builds and at the moment you think it's going to explode into a big, frightening, seductive mash of sex and religion and state troopers, someone forgets an anniversary and entire episodes give over to the petty domestic crises of three otherwise intriguing women."

Emily St. James of Slant Magazine wrote, "While the main plotlines all focus on Bill, writers and creators Mark V. Olsen and Will Scheffer use the hoary old device of a husband forgetting he and his wife's anniversary to illuminate the least-developed Henrickson." Shirley Halperin of Entertainment Weekly wrote, "We didn't get a ton of Ben and Sarah on this episode, but I expect that they'll be debating the legitimacy of plural marriage more and more in the weeks to come. Meanwhile, they're letting their friends and significant others in on the secret, but can all these outsiders be trusted? After all, Don's got 16 mouths to feed; the last thing he and the Home Plus team need is any more negative exposure. Bill insists that being family owned gives the store an edge, but at what cost? Has he gone over the edge with this latest PR mess?"

Meredith O'Brien of TV Squad wrote, "Like with Barb, I feel for Joey's character as he seems like yet another pawn, a quiet, nice guy who's pushed around and influenced by more powerful people who are promoting their own interests." Television Without Pity gave the episode a "B+" grade.
