= Reunion (Big Love) =

- Big Love episode
- Episode no.: Season 2 Episode 3
- Directed by: Alan Poul
- Written by: Dustin Lance Black
- Cinematography by: M. David Mullen
- Editing by: Meg Reticker
- Original release date: June 25, 2007
- Running time: 51 minutes

Guest appearances
- Mary Kay Place as Adaleen Grant; Brian Kerwin as Eddie; Kyle Gallner as Jason Embry; Judith Hoag as Cindy Dutton-Price; Sarah Jones as Brynn; Karina Logue as Lydia Volmer; Cheryl White as Karen; Wendy Phillips as Peg Embry

Episode chronology
← Previous "The Writing on the Wall"	Next → "Rock and a Hard Place"

"Reunion" is the third episode of the second season of the American drama television series Big Love. It is the fifteenth overall episode of the series and was written by Dustin Lance Black, and directed by Alan Poul. It originally aired on HBO on June 25, 2007.

The series is set in Salt Lake City and follows Bill Henrickson, a fundamentalist Mormon. He practices polygamy, having Barbara, Nicki and Margie as his wives. The series charts the family's life in and out of the public sphere in their suburb, as well as their associations with a fundamentalist compound in the area. In the episode, Bill and Nicki visit Juniper Creek to save Joey from prison, while Barbara questions Ben's time with Margie.

According to Nielsen Media Research, the episode was seen by an estimated 1.66 million household viewers and gained a 0.8/2 ratings share among adults aged 18–49. The episode received extremely positive reviews from critics, who deemed it as an improvement over the previous episodes.

== Plot ==
Bill Henrickson (Bill Paxton) visits Joey (Shawn Doyle) in prison, and Joey reveals that he became a pawn for Roman (Harry Dean Stanton) to save Wanda (Melora Walters) from prison. To negotiate with Roman, Bill and Nicki (Chloë Sevigny) decide to visit Juniper Creek to settle their problems aside. With Joey's position in the council, Bill blocks Roman's support in video poker machines until he gets him out of jail.

Barbara (Jeanne Tripplehorn) is concerned when she finds that Ben (Douglas Smith) is spending a lot of time with Margie (Ginnifer Goodwin). While attending a few of her friends at home, Barbara is annoyed when she finds that Margie and Ben are playing in the pool. She reprimands Ben and tells Margie to focus on her baby's bedroom. Later, Barbara is called by Cindy (Judith Hoag), once again pressuring her into visiting her mother. When she finds that Ben continues staying with Margie, Barbara calls her out on her "inappropriate" relationship with him. Margie is disgusted by the accusation and locks herself in her house.

Rhonda (Daveigh Chase) starts having second thoughts over marrying Roman, so her mother Lydia (Karina Logue) arrives to force her into going forward with the wedding. Roman finally agrees to Bill's terms, and orders Alby (Matt Ross) to come clean to the police the following day. Upset, Alby tells Nicki that it was Roman who informed the council about Barbara's polygamy. Nicki confronts Roman, who does not deny it. A heartbroken Nicki gets Bill to leave the compound, as the police is closing in. After Ben gets into a fight with his best friend, Margie explains to Barbara that she spends time to help him, which Barbara finally understands. As Bill and Nicki return home, Rhonda is revealed to have sneaked into their car and knocks on Barbara's door. Surprised, Barbara allows her to enter.

== Production ==
=== Development ===
The episode was written by Dustin Lance Black, and directed by Alan Poul. This was Black's second writing credit, and Poul's second directing credit.

== Reception ==
=== Viewers ===
In its original American broadcast, "Reunion" was seen by an estimated 1.66 million household viewers with a 0.8/2 in the 18–49 demographics. This means that 0.8 percent of all households with televisions watched the episode, while 2 percent of all of those watching television at the time of the broadcast watched it. This was a 8% increase in viewership from the previous episode, which was watched by an estimated 1.53 million household viewers with a 1.1/3 in the 18–49 demographics.

=== Critical reviews ===
"Reunion" received extremely positive reviews from critics. Dan Iverson of IGN gave the episode a "great" 8 out of 10 rating and wrote, ""Reunion" was an excellent episode of television, which perfectly continued on-going storylines, while taking others in unforeseen directions. It will be interesting to see the fallout of Bill finding out about Roman's call and Rhonda's departure from the compound, but we will just have to wait till next week to see where those stories head next. As for this week's episode, if you enjoy Big Love this was definitely an episode worth watching - otherwise if you have never seen the show before, this may be a decent episode to start watching this quality HBO series."

Trish Wethman of TV Guide wrote, "The next time I complain about a big family get-together, I am going to think back to this episode and thank my lucky stars. Nicki's supersized lineage was on the front burner tonight as she convinced Bill to visit the compound with her and even stay as a guest in Roman's house. Suffice it to say that Jerry Springer could have a field day with this bunch." Emily Nussbaum of Vulture wrote, "In this excellent, totally confusing episode, Big Love flashed its seamy petticoats all over the place, like a cancan dancer for Christ."

Emily St. James of Slant Magazine wrote, "“Reunion” is probably the best episode of the second season so far, largely because it ditches the increasingly irritating shenanigans at Henrickson Home Plus and more smoothly integrates the Juniper Creek characters into the main Henrickson storyline." Shirley Halperin of Entertainment Weekly wrote, "From the get-go, this was the episode of unlikely pairings: Ben and Margene, Bill and Roman, Barb and Rhonda, Alby and... who knows. But man, was it action-packed! And filled with plenty of great zingers (mostly courtesy of Adeleen) and even some answers."

Jen Creer of TV Squad wrote, "it was not accurate for Ben to ask if Sarah thought he was going to hell. There is no hell in Mormon theology. There are three kingdoms of heaven, and the lowest would be sort of equivalent to a traditional idea of hell. But nobody how had been raised Mormon as these two kids were would use that kind of phrasing about going to hell, unless they were joking, re: 'Oh, we are so going to hell for this.'" Television Without Pity gave the episode an "A–" grade.

Harry Dean Stanton submitted this episode for consideration for Outstanding Supporting Actor in a Drama Series, while Alan Poul submitted it for Outstanding Directing for a Drama Series at the 60th Primetime Emmy Awards.
