= Damage Control (Big Love) =

- Big Love episode
- Episode no.: Season 2 Episode 1
- Directed by: Daniel Minahan
- Written by: Mark V. Olsen; Will Scheffer
- Cinematography by: James Glennon
- Editing by: Byron Smith
- Original release date: June 11, 2007
- Running time: 53 minutes

Guest appearances
- Mary Kay Place as Adaleen Grant; Jodie Markell as Wendy Hunt; Aaron Paul as Scott Quittman

Episode chronology
← Previous "The Ceremony"	Next → "The Writing on the Wall"

"Damage Control" is the first episode of the second season of the American drama television series Big Love. It is the thirteenth overall episode of the series and was written by series creators Mark V. Olsen and Will Scheffer and directed by Daniel Minahan. It originally aired on HBO on June 11, 2007.

The series is set in Salt Lake City and follows Bill Henrickson, a fundamentalist Mormon. He practices polygamy, having Barbara, Nicki and Margie as his wives. The series charts the family's life in and out of the public sphere in their suburb, as well as their associations with a fundamentalist compound in the area. In the episode, Barbara goes into hiding after being exposed at the ceremony, while Bill tries to find out who is responsible for the incident.

According to Nielsen Media Research, the episode was seen by an estimated 2.21 million household viewers and gained a 1.1/3 ratings share among adults aged 18–49. The episode received mostly positive reviews from critics, who praised the performances, writing and follow-up to the cliffhanger.

== Plot ==
Two weeks after the events at the Governor's house, Nicki (Chloë Sevigny) and Margie (Ginnifer Goodwin) have helped Barbara (Jeanne Tripplehorn) with the house's tasks as she stays reclusive. Bill Henrickson (Bill Paxton) has been investigating to find who exposed her, suspecting that Carl (Carlos Jacott) and Pam (Audrey Wasilewski) may be involved. He has also checked on Wendy (Jodie Markell), discussing with Don (Joel McKinnon Miller) on possible ways to fire her in legal terms.

At Juniper Creek, Wanda (Melora Walters) is questioned over her possible poisoning of Alby (Matt Ross). At church, she explains her version of the story to Roman (Harry Dean Stanton), but Alby, using a wheelchair, arrives to insult and condemn her. When Joey (Shawn Doyle) calls for help, Bill agrees in sending him a lawyer. Joey meets with Roman, who states that Wanda's situation can end if Joey can use his position to get pivotal votes for Roman. Bill decides to schedule a dinner with Carl and Pam to see if they are involved, but Barbara refuses to attend. When Bill pressures her, Barbara decides to move in with Don's family temporarily. While visiting Nicki, Adaleen (Mary Kay Place) gives her a revolver as a gift for protection. Sarah (Amanda Seyfried) attends an Ex-Mormon support group, where a member, Scott Quittman (Aaron Paul), takes an interest in her.

When Wendy realizes that Bill and Don are following her actions, she confronts them at Bill's office. When she threatens that she knows about Bill's lifestyle, Bill threatens with action if she damages the store's reputation. Later, Wendy is stalked by a person driving a Hummer in the parking lot. Attempting to evade it, she accidentally crashes her car. Bill also meets with an Attorney General aide, who states that he cannot be charged as the claims are not verified. Bill fails to persuade Barbara in returning home, but she changes her mind after talking with Nicki and Margie. Bill and Barbara dine with Carl and Pam, evading suspicion. Afterwards, Bill apologizes to Barbara for getting her involved into his life, but Barbara is willing to move forward with him.

== Production ==
=== Development ===
The episode was written by series creators Mark V. Olsen and Will Scheffer, and directed by Daniel Minahan. This was Olsen's ninth writing credit, Scheffer's ninth writing credit, and Minahan's first directing credit.

== Reception ==
=== Viewers ===
In its original American broadcast, "Damage Control" was seen by an estimated 2.21 million household viewers with a 1.1/3 in the 18–49 demographics. This means that 1.1 percent of all households with televisions watched the episode, while 3 percent of all of those watching television at the time of the broadcast watched it. This was a massive 52% decrease in viewership from the previous episode, which was watched by an estimated 4.55 million household viewers.

=== Critical reviews ===
"Damage Control" received mostly positive reviews from critics. Dan Iverson of IGN gave the episode a "good" 7.5 out of 10 rating and wrote, "So, while Big Love isn't as profound and enthralling as other HBO series, the show is of such technical quality that we can't help but commend it. With excellent acting, humorous and dramatically engaging writing and expert directing, episodes like "Damage Control" prove that although Big Love doesn't have the following or credentials of The Sopranos or The Wire, it still stands as a television program worth your time and definitely worth recommending to those who are looking for something lighter and less vulgar on HBO."

Trish Wethman of TV Guide wrote, "I'm curious to see where this season takes us. The stresses of juggling three demanding wives is difficult enough, but when you add in a growing roster of kids, a somewhat hapless business partner, an emotionally vulnerable brother, a borderline sister-in-law, and that scary Roman, I'm not sure how Bill is going to make it through. Thankfully, at least for this week, Barb came through and showed up for the wacky dinner with the neighbors in order to throw off them off the scent. Bill was right when he said that she is the one who shines. Here's hoping that she regains her confidence quickly and helps Bill navigate the murky waters to come." Sara Cardace of Vulture wrote, "last season's cliff-hanger — will Barb's unmasking at the governor's mansion lead to social exile and ruin for the Hendrickson clan? — was barely addressed. The terror of being exposed, which once simmered under the dialogue in almost every scene, has died down, confusingly, to a far-off-in-the-future problem that doesn't seem to bother anyone all that much."

Emily St. James of Slant Magazine wrote, "“Damage Control” is probably the weakest of the season's first five episodes, but it does most of the heavy lifting required to get the plot away from the revelation of the Henrickson family's polygamous lifestyle at the governor's mansion in last season's finale and on to other business. This mildly irritating plot won't go away completely, but this week's episode deals with it the most fully." Shirley Halperin of Entertainment Weekly wrote, "how appropriate that the opening scene of season 2 should show Barb, still tormented by the embarrassment of being disqualified at the Beehive Mother of the Year ceremony, diving into the backyard pool, à la The Graduate. There's some serious psychological trauma going on here. and things already look like they'll get worse before they get better for the Henrickson clan."

Jen Creer of TV Squad wrote, "This was a great way to start the season, though, because it showed that Barb is really the lynchpin of that family - not Bill. If Barb leaves, the whole family unravels. I think if something were to happen to Bill, the women would continue to sit at that dining room table and divy up the shopping list. It's interesting, because even though Nicki is overtly greedy for the power that comes with being first wife, I think Barb really enjoys that position as well." Television Without Pity gave the episode a "B+" grade.
