= Rock and a Hard Place (Big Love) =

- Big Love episode
- Episode no.: Season 2 Episode 4
- Directed by: Adam Davidson
- Written by: Jeanette Collins; Mimi Friedman
- Cinematography by: Haskell Wexler
- Editing by: Byron Smith
- Original release date: July 2, 2007
- Running time: 54 minutes

Guest appearances
- Mary Kay Place as Adaleen Grant; Brian Kerwin as Eddie; Jim Beaver as Carter Reese; Tina Majorino as Heather Tuttle; Aaron Paul as Scott Quittman; Sarah Jones as Brynn; Margaret Easley as April Blessing; David Norona as Neal Berger; Lawrence O'Donnell as Lee Hatcher; Audrey Wasilewski as Pam Martin

Episode chronology
← Previous "Reunion"	Next → "Vision Thing"

"Rock and a Hard Place" is the fourth episode of the second season of the American drama television series Big Love. It is the sixteenth overall episode of the series and was written by supervising producers Jeanette Collins and Mimi Friedman, and directed by Adam Davidson. It originally aired on HBO on July 2, 2007.

The series is set in Salt Lake City and follows Bill Henrickson, a fundamentalist Mormon. He practices polygamy, having Barbara, Nicki and Margie as his wives. The series charts the family's life in and out of the public sphere in their suburb, as well as their associations with a fundamentalist compound in the area. In the episode, Bill tries to get his brother to testify against his wife, while the Henricksons have to deal with Rhonda's presence.

According to Nielsen Media Research, the episode was seen by an estimated 1.63 million household viewers and gained a 0.8/2 ratings share among adults aged 18–49. The episode received positive reviews from critics, who praised the character development and writing.

== Plot ==
With Rhonda (Daveigh Chase) now secretly living with them, the Henricksons consider what to do, fearing that Roman (Harry Dean Stanton) may believe they took her. Rhonda refuses to leave, and even threatens Nicki (Chloë Sevigny) to tell the family that Roman exposed Barbara (Jeanne Tripplehorn) at the "Mother of the Year" ceremony.

Two Juniper Creek officers arrive and search the Henricksons' houses looking for Rhonda. Don (Joel McKinnon Miller) manages to sneak her off, but Nicki is insulted for her actions. Barbara and Nicki then place Rhonda in a temporary shelter against her will. While visiting Joey (Shawn Doyle) ahead of his trial, Bill (Bill Paxton) is furious upon learning that Joey helped Roman in getting an incriminating tape against Bill in exchange to spare Wanda (Melora Walters). When Joey refuses to change his testimony, Bill contacts Lois (Grace Zabriskie) to warn her they both might go to prison if the testimony comes to pass, and threatens Roman into giving up the tape or he will contact authorities over his marriage. When Lois expresses interest in shooting the District Attorney, Wanda hides a gun in the baby's carrier before leaving for the hearing.

When Nicki is approached by child services agents, she is confronted by Adaleen (Mary Kay Place) over lying to her family. Nicki hits back by claiming that Roman exposed Barbara, causing Adaleen to disown Nicki as a daughter and bans her from ever returning to Juniper Creek. At the court hearing, Bill deduces that Roman's lawyer does not have the tape and tries to negotiate with his attorney over not accepting his terms. He calls Adaleen to ask for the tape. Heartbroken, Adaleen denies having his tape and destroys it in Roman's office. Wanda suddenly gives the gun to Bill, causing him to quickly drop it at a trash bin. Without any evidence, Joey is released from prison. Bill returns home, discovering Barbara and Margie (Ginnifer Goodwin) consoling Nicki, who prepares to tell Bill of the recent events. At night, Rhonda grabs her stuff from the shelter and flees to an unknown destination.

== Production ==
=== Development ===
The episode was written by supervising producers Jeanette Collins and Mimi Friedman, and directed by Adam Davidson. This was Friedman's third writing credit, Collins' third writing credit, and Davidson's first directing credit.

== Reception ==
=== Viewers ===
In its original American broadcast, "Rock and a Hard Place" was seen by an estimated 1.63 million household viewers with a 0.8/2 in the 18–49 demographics. This means that 0.8 percent of all households with televisions watched the episode, while 2 percent of all of those watching television at the time of the broadcast watched it. This was a slight decrease in viewership from the previous episode, which was watched by an estimated 1.66 million household viewers with a 0.8/2 in the 18–49 demographics.

=== Critical reviews ===
"Rock and a Hard Place" received positive reviews from critics. Dan Iverson of IGN gave the episode a "good" 7.2 out of 10 rating and wrote, ""Rock and a Hard Place" may not have been the best episode of Big Love, but it did continue many big storylines as well as create some interesting new ones as well. But, while we would like to say that we were compelled by the whole thing, we just weren't. Between some of the slower storylines and a pace which slows down the action and real drama, we were twiddling our thumbs in preparation for the larger events of the episode. Once again however, this wasn't a bad episode, in fact it was a decent hour of television - and we would recommend it whole-heartedly to fans of the series."

Trish Wethman of TV Guide wrote, "I have been consistently pleased with the acting and writing on Big Love this season. Each episode seems to get better, and I think we are building some promising story lines. I say keep it coming." Emily Nussbaum of Vulture wrote, "This second stellar episode of Big Love in a row featured plenty of plot turns. But for all the legal byplay, Big Love has always been at heart a festival of feminine subversion, like Mean Girls in sack dresses. These nervy manipulations are the show's true engine, fueling its theme: that women forced to scrap for influence will develop perverse superpowers, from meekness jujitsu to the laser-focused deployment of secrets."

Emily St. James of Slant Magazine wrote, "The fourth episode of Big Love's second season, “Rock and a Hard Place,” was kind of clumsy in a lot of ways. It reduced most of the show's villains to malevolent stereotypes, hell-bent on giving the Henrickson family a hard time. Most of the subtext that makes the show so entertaining was thrown out the window. And things that should have been built up more resonantly or build to more logically were just blown by, including major plot points that have been big parts of the season so far." Shirley Halperin of Entertainment Weekly wrote, "Several viewers commented last week that they found the "Reunion" episode confusing. And while Monday's show did resolve a couple of key plot points (namely, Joey's trial), I'm still perplexed about certain characters' motives."

Meredith O'Brien of TV Squad wrote, "The many disparate storylines that flowed through the fresh episode of Big Love reminded me, for some reason, of a spider web, with the Henrickson family playing the role of the web. No matter what was happening, it all led back to the Henricksons and their three homes sitting in a tidy row." Television Without Pity gave the episode a "C+" grade.

Chloë Sevigny submitted this episode for consideration for Outstanding Lead Actress in a Drama Series, while Mary Kay Place submitted it for Outstanding Supporting Actress in a Drama Series at the 60th Primetime Emmy Awards.
