= Vision Thing =

Vision Thing may refer to:

- Vision Thing (album), a 1990 album by The Sisters of Mercy
- Vision Thing (Big Love), an episode of the American TV series Big Love
- "Vision Thing", a song by Simple Minds from their 2022 album Direction of the Heart
- "The Vision Thing", a season 12 episode of NYPD Blue
- "The vision thing", a comment made by George H. W. Bush ahead of the 1988 presidential election when urged to spend some time thinking about his plans for his prospective presidency

== See also ==
- "That Vision Thing", an episode of Angel
