= Dating Game (Big Love) =

- Big Love episode
- Episode no.: Season 2 Episode 6
- Directed by: Jim McKay
- Written by: Doug Jung
- Cinematography by: M. David Mullen
- Editing by: Byron Smith
- Original release date: July 16, 2007
- Running time: 55 minutes

Guest appearances
- John Carroll Lynch as Officer Chuck Tuttle; George Newbern as Polygamist Group Member; Branka Katić as Ana; Tina Majorino as Heather Tuttle; Margaret Easley as April Blessing; Meagen Fay as Laura Tuttle; Sarah Jones as Brynn; Luke Askew as Hollis Green; Sandy Martin as Selma Green; Garrett M. Brown as Bishop Devery; Mike Pniewski as Holy Priest

Episode chronology
← Previous "Vision Thing"	Next → "Good Guys and Bad Guys"

"Dating Game" is the sixth episode of the second season of the American drama television series Big Love. It is the eighteenth overall episode of the series. It was written by producer Doug Jung and directed by Jim McKay. It originally aired on HBO on July 16, 2007.

The series is set in Salt Lake City and follows Bill Henrickson, a fundamentalist Mormon who practices polygamy, having Barbara, Nicki, and Margie as his wives. The series charts the family's life in and out of the public sphere in their suburb, and their associations with a fundamentalist compound in the area. In the episode, Bill's pursuit of the gambling venture puts him into conflict with a powerful family, while Margie befriends Ana.

According to Nielsen Media Research, the episode was seen by an estimated 1.92 million household viewers and gained a 0.9/3 ratings share among adults aged 18–49. The episode received very positive reviews from critics, who praised its writing and new characters.

== Plot ==
Bill (Bill Paxton) is now dating Ana (Branka Katić), and they share their first kiss after taking her to a local dance presentation. At the same time, Margie (Ginnifer Goodwin) has befriended Ana. She does not reveal her connection to Bill but opens up about her polygamy marriage.

Rhonda (Daveigh Chase) wants the Tuttles to adopt her properly and even gets custody agents involved. Later, Nicki (Chloë Sevigny) is questioned over her connection to Roman, as she is suspected of having led Rhonda to Roman. As Bill continues into the Weber Gambling venture, Don (Joel McKinnon Miller) informs him that their partner, Carter Reese, was threatened by an unknown party and has lost all contact with them. Bill is also confused when he finds that a brand new boat he bought has been caught in flames, suspecting that Roman might get involved. Bill has another encounter with Ana but is unable to commit to having sex with her. He is further angered when he learns Margie is hanging out with her.

After discovering Rhonda lives with the Tuttles, Nicki visits her to talk to her. Rhonda refuses to leave with her and feigns that Nicki might be abusing her. Heather's father, Chuck (John Carroll Lynch), talks with Sarah (Amanda Seyfried) as Rhonda claims Bill made her uncomfortable. When Sarah returns home crying, Barbara (Jeanne Tripplehorn) angrily confronts Chuck for falling for a manipulative girl. Rhonda shows her true colors to Barbara, and the Tuttles take Rhonda back into the house. Bill visits Ana and breaks up with her. Outside the parking lot, he is approached by representatives of the Green polygamist family, and he willfully agrees to be taken.

Bill is introduced to Hollis Green (Luke Askew), the patriarch at a warehouse. Hollis reveals that Reese was getting the gambling venture from the Greens, which led to his exile. Before he is marked with an iron, Bill claims that he tried to get Weber Gaming for Roman and saves himself by saying he can get it back to the Greens. As Bill returns to his car, he notices Margie consoling a heartbroken Ana at her restaurant. He calls Margie to meet outside, where she cries as she explains that she loves her. While Bill understands her position, he says he cannot marry her solely for her. As they drive off, he says he knew she was special when he met her.

== Production ==
=== Development ===
The episode was written by producer Doug Jung and directed by Jim McKay. This was Jung's first writing credit and McKay's first directing credit.

== Reception ==
=== Viewers ===
In its original American broadcast, "Dating Game" was seen by an estimated 1.92 million household viewers with a 0.9/3 in the 18–49 demographics. This means that 0.9 percent of all households with televisions watched the episode, while 3 percent of all those watching television at the time of the broadcast watched it. This was a slight increase in viewership from the previous episode, which was watched by an estimated 1.86 million household viewers with a 0.9/3 in the 18–49 demographics.

=== Critical reviews ===
"Dating Game" received very positive reviews from critics. Trish Wethman of TV Guide wrote, "For me, this show just seems to get better week after week. I feel like my investment in the first season is paying off in dividends as the story unfolds. Last season laid the groundwork for all of the drama and intrigue that is coming to the fore now, and each week, I find myself increasingly anxious to see what happens next."

Emily Nussbaum of Vulture wrote, "More business stuff transpires, with super-spooky sister-wife arson and someone named Hollis and a man in a toupee in a chair in a van and a slow descent into a mysterious basement world filled with knickknacks and old mattresses. "God wants us to possess it for our portfolio. You took it … You will disgorge that company." And then the threats of branding. What the hell? Are they using Tarantino scare tactics to force us to get interested in the business plots? It won't work, dammit! Bring back crazy Wanda and Adelene."

Emily St. James of Slant Magazine wrote, "The halfway point for Big Love's second season, “The Dating Game,” is frustrating first because it's so good and then because it seems to mire itself in the plotline that's the least interesting on the show." Shirley Halperin of Entertainment Weekly wrote, "Well, Bill dove headfirst with Ana. That was expected, though last week, it was still unclear just how far he would go. But what was surprising in this story arc was Margene's decision to surreptitiously befriend the Serbian waitress, tempting and, at the same time, twisting the hands of fate."

Jen Creer of TV Squad wrote, "I liked Ana, and I thought her friendship with Margene was very sweet. I admired Bill, though, for realizing that maybe it was just lust on his part and ending the relationship. I also admire him for not sleeping with Ana. Can he make out with her without two of his wives knowing he sees someone as part of an eternal principle? Just curious about this protocol." Television Without Pity gave the episode a "B+" grade.

Branka Katić submitted this episode for consideration for Outstanding Supporting Actress in a Drama Series. In contrast, Doug Jung submitted it for Outstanding Writing for a Drama Series at the 60th Primetime Emmy Awards.
