= The Last Rodeo =

Film by Jon Avnet

- Theatrical release poster
- Directed by: Jon Avnet
- Written by: Neal McDonough; Jon Avnet; Derek Presley
- Produced by: Darren Moorman; Stephen Preston; Ruvé McDonough; Neal McDonough; Jon Avnet; Kip Konwiser
- Starring: Neal McDonough; Mykelti Williamson; Sarah Jones; Daylon Swearingen; Christopher McDonald
- Cinematography: Denis Lenoir
- Edited by: Tom Costantino
- Music by: Jeff Russo
- Production companies: Brooklyn Films; The McDonough Company; Red Sky Studios
- Distributed by: Angel Studios
- Release date: May 23, 2025
- Running time: 118 minutes
- Country: United States
- Language: English
- Budget: $8 million
- Box office: $15.2 million

The Last Rodeo is a 2025 American drama film written and directed by Jon Avnet. It stars Neal McDonough (who is also a co-writer and producer), Mykelti Williamson, Christopher McDonald, Sarah Jones, and Daylon Swearingen.

== Plot ==
Joe Wainwright is a former bull riding world champion who risks it all to save his grandson who needs an expensive invasive surgery on a brain tumor that Joe's military veteran benefits and the family's insurance do not cover. Facing his own painful past in which he had broken his neck riding a bull while drunk, he enters a high-stakes bull riding competition organized by the Professional Bull Riders that is open to former legends with $750,000 prize for the first prize, as the oldest contestant ever, and has to sign an insurance waiver. Along the way, he reconciles old wounds with his estranged daughter, who had to take care of him after his injury and given up on her own professional pursuits, and proves that true courage is found in the fight for family.

== Cast ==
- Neal McDonough as Joe Wainright
- Ruvé McDonough as Rose Wainright
- Mykelti Williamson as Charlie Williams
- Christopher McDonald as Jimmy Mack
- Sarah Jones as Sally Wainright
- Daylon Swearingen as Billy Hamilton
- Irene Bedard as Agisa Williams

== Production ==
Filming took place in Owasso and Collinsville, Oklahoma, from March to April 2024.

== Release ==
The Last Rodeo was released in the United States on May 23, 2025.

== Reception ==
=== Box office ===
In the United States and Canada, The Last Rodeo opened alongside Lilo & Stitch, Mission: Impossible – The Final Reckoning, and Friendship, and grossed $5.4 million during the weekend of May 23–26 and $6.9 million over the four-day Memorial Day weekend, finishing sixth at the box office.

=== Critical response ===
On the review aggregator website Rotten Tomatoes, 70% of 40 critics' reviews are positive. The website's consensus reads: "The Last Rodeo is a predictable yet heartfelt family drama elevated by earnest performances and old-fashioned charm, though its overly safe storytelling keeps it from breaking new ground." Metacritic, which uses a weighted average, assigned the film a score of 61 out of 100, based on 6 critics, indicating "generally favorable" reviews. Audiences polled by CinemaScore gave the film an average grade of "A" on an A+ to F scale.
