= The Ceremony (Big Love) =

- Big Love episode
- Episode no.: Season 1 Episode 12
- Directed by: Julian Farino
- Written by: Mark V. Olsen; Will Scheffer
- Cinematography by: Russ Alsobrook
- Editing by: Carole Kravetz
- Original release date: June 4, 2006
- Running time: 47 minutes

Guest appearances
- Mary Kay Place as Adaleen Grant; Matt Ross as Alby Grant

Episode chronology
← Previous "Where There's a Will"	Next → "Damage Control"

"The Ceremony" is the twelfth episode and first-season finale of the American drama television series Big Love. The episode was written by series creators Mark V. Olsen and Will Scheffer, and directed by Julian Farino. It originally aired on HBO on June 4, 2006.

The series is set in Salt Lake City and follows Bill Henrickson, a fundamentalist Mormon. He practices polygamy, having Barbara, Nicki and Margie as his wives. The series charts the family's life in and out of the public sphere in their suburb, as well as their associations with a fundamentalist compound in the area. In the episode, Bill and Joey face Roman with a seat at the table, while Barbara prepares for the "Mother of the Year" ceremony.

According to Nielsen Media Research, the episode was seen by an estimated 4.55 million household viewers. The episode received extremely positive reviews from critics, who praised its cliffhanger ending as a highlight.

== Plot ==
Bill Henrickson (Bill Paxton) and Joey (Shawn Doyle) prepare their plan against Roman (Harry Dean Stanton), wherein they will use Ernest's seat at the table to gain access to his documents. Meanwhile, Barbara (Jeanne Tripplehorn) is preparing for the "Mother of the Year" ceremony at the Governor's mansion, although Nicki (Chloë Sevigny) is worried about her presence.

Alby (Matt Ross) visits Wanda (Melora Walters) at her house, believing that Bill is staying with her. Fed up with him, she provides him with a drink that poisons him. When Joey returns home, he is shocked to discover Alby unconscious. He arrives late to meet with Bill outside the UEB Priesthood Council meeting, but they proceed with their plan anyway. Roman objects to their roles in the council, but Bill leaves with Roman's financial documents anyway. After leaving, Bill is told about Alby's poisoning, and discovers that she is also responsible for Frank's poisoning. He consoles Joey, instructing him to secretly drop Alby at a hospital.

Rhonda (Daveigh Chase), still believing to be part of the acting competition, decides to stay to attend school. Adaleen (Mary Kay Place) arrives, and forces her to return to Juniper Creek. Roman confronts Bill at his office, threatening to retaliate. Bill dismisses his threat, explaining that he now has enough evidence against him stored in his computers. Bill warns that if anything happens to him or his family, he will send Roman's financial records to the Internal Revenue Service. Roman is forced to accept his terms, but also questions his role in Alby's disappearance, with Bill pretending not to know anything. When he returns home, Roman decides to call an unspecified person about the day's "ceremony."

Nicki is not content with Barbara's decision to go, and refuses to attend her ceremony. She is convinced that this is important for the whole company, and changes her mind. However, Barbara is notified that two tickets were not sent for "her sisters", so Nicki and Margie (Ginnifer Goodwin) decide to go out to a restaurant. As the ceremony begins, the First Lady is interrupted by a new revelation from Barbara and privately questions if she practices polygamy. Barbara confesses, and she is disqualified from the ceremony. As Bill asks what happened, he is told to discuss it with his wives, causing the crowd to deduce it. The Henricksons are forced to return home, and Nicki and Margie return to comfort a crying Barbara at her bedroom. As Roman visits Alby at the hospital, Bill sits alone outside his house, questioning what to do.

== Production ==
=== Development ===
The episode was written by series creators Mark V. Olsen and Will Scheffer, and directed by Julian Farino. This was Olsen's eighth writing credit, Scheffer's eighth writing credit, and Farino's second directing credit.

== Reception ==
=== Viewers ===
In its original American broadcast, "The Ceremony" was seen by an estimated 4.55 million household viewers. This was a 10% increase in viewership from the previous episode, which was watched by an estimated 4.10 million household viewers.

=== Critical reviews ===
"The Ceremony" received extremely positive reviews from critics. Jay Christianson of IGN gave the episode a "good" 7 out of 10 rating and wrote, "As season one of Big Love concludes we're treated to a standard HBO end-of-season cliffhanger; someone's damn near dead, and the world's about to come crashing in on the family."

Michael Peck of TV Guide wrote, "I think this is where I check out of this show. It was intriguing enough in the beginning, and it gets points for overcoming my initial doubts since I came in figuring HBO was just trying to come up with an attention-getter by putting together a polygamy show. Early on, I was pulled in by the solid writing and excellent acting. But y'know, I don't think they know where to go from here. And I'm hoping they prove me wrong next season."

Michael Sciannamea of TV Squad wrote, "All in all, it was a good first season for Big Love. What started out as a bizarre story turned very compelling over the last 12 weeks, and the writing and actors have come into their own. I'm looking forward to the next season, and seeing how this whole thing shakes out." Television Without Pity gave the episode a "B" grade.

The Futon Critic named the episode as the 45th best TV episode of 2006.
