= Alcatraz (TV series) =

American television series

- Genre: Science fiction; Thriller; Drama
- Created by: Elizabeth Sarnoff; Steven Lilien; Bryan Wynbrandt
- Starring: Sarah Jones; Jorge Garcia; Jonny Coyne; Parminder Nagra; Jason Butler Harner; Sam Neill; Robert Forster
- Theme music composer: J. J. Abrams
- Composers: Michael Giacchino; Chris Tilton; Andrea Datzman
- Country of origin: United States
- Original language: English
- No. of seasons: 1
- No. of episodes: 13

Production
- Executive producers: J. J. Abrams; Jack Bender; Bryan Burk; Jennifer Johnson; Daniel Pyne
- Producers: Alison Balian; Robert Hull; Athena Wickham; Robert M. Williams, Jr.
- Production locations: Riverview Hospital, Coquitlam, British Columbia / Vancouver, British Columbia, Canada / San Francisco, United States (pilot)
- Cinematography: Stephen McNutt; David Stockton
- Running time: 43 minutes
- Production companies: Bad Robot; Bonanza Productions; Warner Bros. Television

Original release
- Network: Fox
- Release: January 16 – March 26, 2012

Alcatraz is an American television series created by Elizabeth Sarnoff, Steven Lilien and Bryan Wynbrandt, and produced by J. J. Abrams and Bad Robot. The series premiered on Fox on January 16, 2012, as a mid-season replacement. Switching between eras, the series focuses on the Alcatraz prison, which was shut down in 1963 due to unsafe conditions for its prisoners and guards. The show's premise is that both the prisoners and the guards disappeared in 1963 and have abruptly reappeared in modern-day San Francisco, where they are being tracked down by a government agency, to prevent them from committing further crimes while also determining the reasons for their return. The series starred Sarah Jones, Jorge Garcia, Sam Neill, and Parminder Nagra.

On May 9, 2012, Fox canceled the series after one season.

== Plot summary ==
On March 21, 1963, 256 inmates and 46 guards disappeared from the Alcatraz Federal Penitentiary without a trace. To cover up the disappearance, the government invented a cover story about the prison being closed due to unsafe conditions, and officially reported that the inmates had been transferred. However, federal agent Emerson Hauser (Sam Neill), a young San Francisco police officer tasked with transferring inmates to the island in 1963, is one of the first to discover that the inmates are actually missing and not transferred. In present-day San Francisco, the "63s" (as the missing inmates and guards are called) begin returning, one by one. Strangely, they have not aged at all, and they have no clues about their missing time or their whereabouts during their missing years; however, they appear to be returning with compulsions to find certain objects and to continue their criminal habits. Even more strangely, the government has been expecting their return, and Hauser now runs a secret government unit dedicated to finding the returning prisoners; this unit was set up long ago in anticipation of the prisoners' returns. (The cellblock at this unit has the same configuration as Alcatraz' distinctive two-level layout.) To help track down the returning prisoners and capture them, Hauser enlists police detective Rebecca Madsen (Sarah Jones) and Dr. Diego Soto (Jorge Garcia), a published expert on the history of Alcatraz and its inmates.

Opening: (Narrated by Sam Neill in every episode)

"On March 21, 1963, Alcatraz officially closed. All the prisoners were transferred off the island. Only, that's not what happened. Not at all."

== Cast and characters ==
=== Main ===
- Sarah Jones as Rebecca Madsen, a San Francisco Police Department homicide detective with family ties to Alcatraz; she becomes involved after one of the inmates – her grandfather – is responsible for the death of her partner, directly meeting the task force when investigating the death of the former deputy warden at Alcatraz. She was raised by her great-uncle – a former Alcatraz guard and, later, cop – after the death of her parents, occasionally helping him look over his case files as she was growing up and offering useful insight into his cases, inspiring her own career.
- Jorge Garcia as Dr. Diego "Doc" Soto, a PhD in both criminal justice and Civil War history, author of books on Alcatraz, comic book store owner, writer, and artist. He claims that he received the PhDs to satisfy his parents, subsequently deliberately disgracing himself in the industry by writing a crime evaluation report using Gotham City as his example so that he could open the store. He went through an unspecified traumatic experience at age eleven involving being abducted, which affected him deeply. Although he lacks field training, Doc's detailed knowledge of the missing Alcatraz prisoners has proven invaluable in helping the task force identify and track the returning inmates.
- Sam Neill as Emerson Hauser, an FBI agent and former police officer who arrived on the dock at Alcatraz to find the prisoners gone in 1963. Currently heads the Alcatraz Task Force. Although his priority is generally to capture and contain the inmates to find out where they went and why they are coming back, he has shown that he is willing to put innocent lives over the lives of the inmates when the situation directly requires him to make a choice. He studied philosophy at Yale University before he began working at Alcatraz.
- Parminder Nagra as Dr. Lucille "Lucy" Banerjee, Agent Hauser's technician/colleague and friend. In 1963, she was known as Dr. Lucille Sengupta, who served as a psychiatrist at Alcatraz, and apparently had the potential of a romantic relationship with Hauser before she vanished. She spent some time in a coma after she was injured during one of the first cases, but recovered thanks to a blood transfusion from Webb Porter due to the accelerated healing of certain inmates due to tests they underwent at Alcatraz.
- Jonny Coyne as Edwin James, the warden of Alcatraz. Although more tolerant of the prisoners, he has been shown to resort to psychological torture in order to learn crucial information about them, such as manipulating Ernest Cobb's attempts to be placed in solitary confinement or threatening to leave Kit Nelson in a small dark room until Nelson admits the truth about his first crime. He apparently vanished with the rest of the inmates, and his present whereabouts are unknown, although he appears to be the only person who knew what was really going on at Alcatraz.
- Jason Butler Harner as Elijah Bailey "E.B." Tiller, the deputy warden of Alcatraz, whose cynical views of the inmates often put him at odds with James; he was killed in the present by Jack Sylvane in the pilot, although he still appears in flashbacks to the past where he brutally treated the various inmates.
- Robert Forster as Raymond "Ray" Archer (previously Ray Madsen), Rebecca's great-uncle and former Alcatraz prison guard; he was approached by Hauser to join the task force sixteen years ago, but rejected the offer due to his responsibilities to Rebecca. He now owns a bar and is aware of at least Tommy Madsen's return, although he is generally unaware of the other 63s.

=== Recurring ===
- David Hoflin as Thomas "Tommy" Madsen (#2002), Rebecca's grandfather and Ray's brother who reappeared in 2012 and killed Rebecca's partner; Rebecca was raised believing that he was a guard at the prison until she witnessed the list of '63s'. He is apparently more significant than the other inmates, as Hauser approached Ray specifically due to his connection to Madsen, with Madsen having been underground for several months since his return rather than the more public activities of other inmates.
- Leon Rippy as Dr. Milton Beauregard, the head doctor of Alcatraz who reappeared in 2012 and operates under Hauser.
- Jeananne Goossen as Nikki, a medical examiner in the coroner's office.
- Jeffrey Pierce as Jack Sylvane (#2024), the first inmate tracked down and captured by the Alcatraz Task Force. While most of his targets fit in with his expected pattern – going after Tiller and his brother, who married his ex-wife – he also went to an unconnected house to acquire a distinctive key from a man's safe. His own ignorance of his reasons for requesting that key suggests that there is another agenda behind the inmates' sudden return.

=== Featured guests ===
==== Inmates (in order of appearance) ====
There were around 302 people on Alcatraz when they all mysteriously vanished, with fewer than 50 of these being prison staff; the other 250+, referred to by Hauser as the '63s, remain some of America's worst recorded criminals. Each one has demonstrated a ruthless skill in their chosen crime fields of expertise and no compunctions about picking up where they left off. Various inmates underwent mysterious experiments involving their blood being extracted, treated with an unidentified process, and then returned to them, those inmates who underwent this procedure possessing a degree of accelerated healing that allows them to recover from wounds in far less time than would normally be expected.

- David Hoflin as Tommy Madsen (#2002)
- Jeffrey Pierce as Jack Sylvane (#2024)
- Joe Egender as Ernest Cobb (#2047)
- Michael Eklund as Kit Nelson (#2046)
- Eric Johnson as Cal Sweeney (#2112)
- James Pizzinato as Paxton Petty (#2223)
- Adam Rothenberg as Johnny McKee (#2055)
- Graham Shiels as Pinky Ames (#2177)
- Travis Aaron Wade as Herman Ames (#2178)
- Theo Rossi as Sonny Burnett (#2088)
- Mahershala Ali as Clarence Montgomery (#2214)
- Rami Malek as Webb Porter (#2012)
- Greg Ellis as Garrett Stillman (#2109)
- Brendan Fletcher as Joe Limerick (Ghost)
- Max Clough as Prison Thug

==== Guards ====
- Jim Parrack as Guy Hastings
- Frank Whaley as Officer Donovan
- Robbie Amell as the young Raymond "Ray" Archer

== Episodes ==
No.	Title	Directed by	Written by	Original release date	Prod. code	U.S. viewers (millions)
1	"Pilot"	Danny Cannon	Steven Lilien, Bryan Wynbrandt & Elizabeth Sarnoff	January 16, 2012	296790	10.05
Years after every prisoner on Alcatraz mysteriously vanished, FBI Agent Emerson Hauser and Detective Rebecca Madsen are drawn into the case of Jack Sylvane, who is on a killing spree. They discover later that Sylvane was actually an inmate in the prison. Joined by Alcatraz expert "Doc" Soto, Hauser and Madsen race to stop Sylvane and solve the mystery of Alcatraz. Hauser takes Sylvane to a prison facility in the woods much like Alcatraz.
2	"Ernest Cobb"	Jack Bender	Alison Balian	January 16, 2012	2J6052	10.05
Ernest Cobb (Joe Egender), another Alcatraz prisoner, is now killing people using a sniper rifle. Madsen and Hauser try to stop him before he kills more, forcing them to try and deduce his motivation for the murder sprees. Cobb shoot Lucy, leaving her comatose. Lucy is also revealed to be working as a doctor in the 1960s as she is introduced to Cobb when he was in Alcatraz.
3	"Kit Nelson"	Jack Bender	Jennifer Johnson	January 23, 2012	2J6053	9.03
A child killer, who kidnapped his victims and returned their bodies home, reappears from the past, spurring a manhunt. Dr. Soto proves his worth by uncovering clues that will lead to the killer's capture. Also, a secret from Dr. Soto's past is revealed.
4	"Cal Sweeney"	Brad Anderson	Robert Hull	January 30, 2012	2J6055	8.44
A bank robber from the past causes mayhem in the present and puts Rebecca in a difficult position as she has to devise a way to get him out of the bank without revealing the existence of the 63s.
5	"Guy Hastings"	Charles Beeson	Steven Lilien & Bryan Wynbrandt	February 6, 2012	2J6056	6.91
A guard from Alcatraz appears - acting in a far more violent manner than the team would have expected - and encounters Ray, whom Rebecca suspects the guard may be using to track down her grandfather. Ray is revealed to be Rebecca's uncle.
6	"Paxton Petty"	Paul Edwards	Story by : Jennifer Johnson; Teleplay by : Steven Lilien, Bryan Wynbrandt & Robert Hull	February 13, 2012	2J6058	6.24
A military land mine specialist resurfaces and plants bombs throughout the city. Rebecca, Soto, and Hauser follow a series of clues to find his next targeted location. Hauser learns that Lucy might not wake up from her coma, so he removes her from the hospital to be fixed by Dr. Beauregard.
7	"Johnny McKee"	Brad Turner	Toni Graphia	February 20, 2012	2J6054	5.98
Johnny McKee, another former Alcatraz prisoner, returns and begins to poison the people of San Francisco, particularly men who behave similarly to grade-school bullies.
8	"The Ames Brothers"	Nick Copus	Robert Hull	March 5, 2012	2J6059	5.82
When brothers Herman and Pinky Ames, who almost escaped in 1961, return to modern times, Soto gets caught and kidnapped by the ultra-violent duo as they follow a map in the hunt for a certain treasure, resulting in a tense confrontation in Alcatraz itself.
9	"Sonny Burnett"	Paul Edwards	Story by : Toni Graphia; Teleplay by : Toni Graphia & Robert Hull	March 5, 2012	2J6060	5.47
Sonny Burnett, sent to 1960 Alcatraz for kidnapping wealthy people and holding them for outrageous ransoms, appears in the present, seeking revenge for the "betrayal" of one of his kidnapping victims in the past. Also, the blood taken from the 1963 prisoners has a modern connection. The link between Rebecca, Uncle Ray, and Tommy is further explored.
10	"Clarence Montgomery"	Jack Bender	Leigh Dana Jackson	March 12, 2012	2J6057	5.07
After a woman is found dead on a golf course, killed in a similar manner to the murdered girlfriend of former Alcatraz inmate Clarence Montgomery, the team begins to suspect that the innocent Montgomery, who was falsely accused of and imprisoned for murdering his girlfriend, has returned, and is now committing crimes similar to that which he was imprisoned for.
11	"Webb Porter"	Jack Bender	Steven Lilien & Bryan Wynbrandt	March 19, 2012	2J6061	5.04
Sent to Alcatraz for killing his mother, who tried to drown him when he was younger, violin-playing former inmate Webb Porter resurfaces. He willingly gives blood to Lucy, allowing her to wake from her coma.
12	"Garrett Stillman"	Eagle Egilsson	Leigh Dana Jackson & Coleman Herbert	March 26, 2012	2J6062	4.78
Doc and Rebecca close in on a man who may be the key to revealing the secrets behind all the returning criminals. Meanwhile, Hauser makes a discovery beneath the halls of Alcatraz that reveals more of the truth.
13	"Tommy Madsen"	Aaron Lipstadt	Daniel Pyne & Jennifer Johnson	March 26, 2012	2J6063	4.75
Rebecca finds the man who killed her partner. The episode includes a recreation of the chase scene in Bullitt. The series ends in a cliffhanger: Rebecca is stabbed by Tommy, flatlines in a hospital and is pronounced dead. Hauser and Lucy make a shocking discovery.

== Production ==
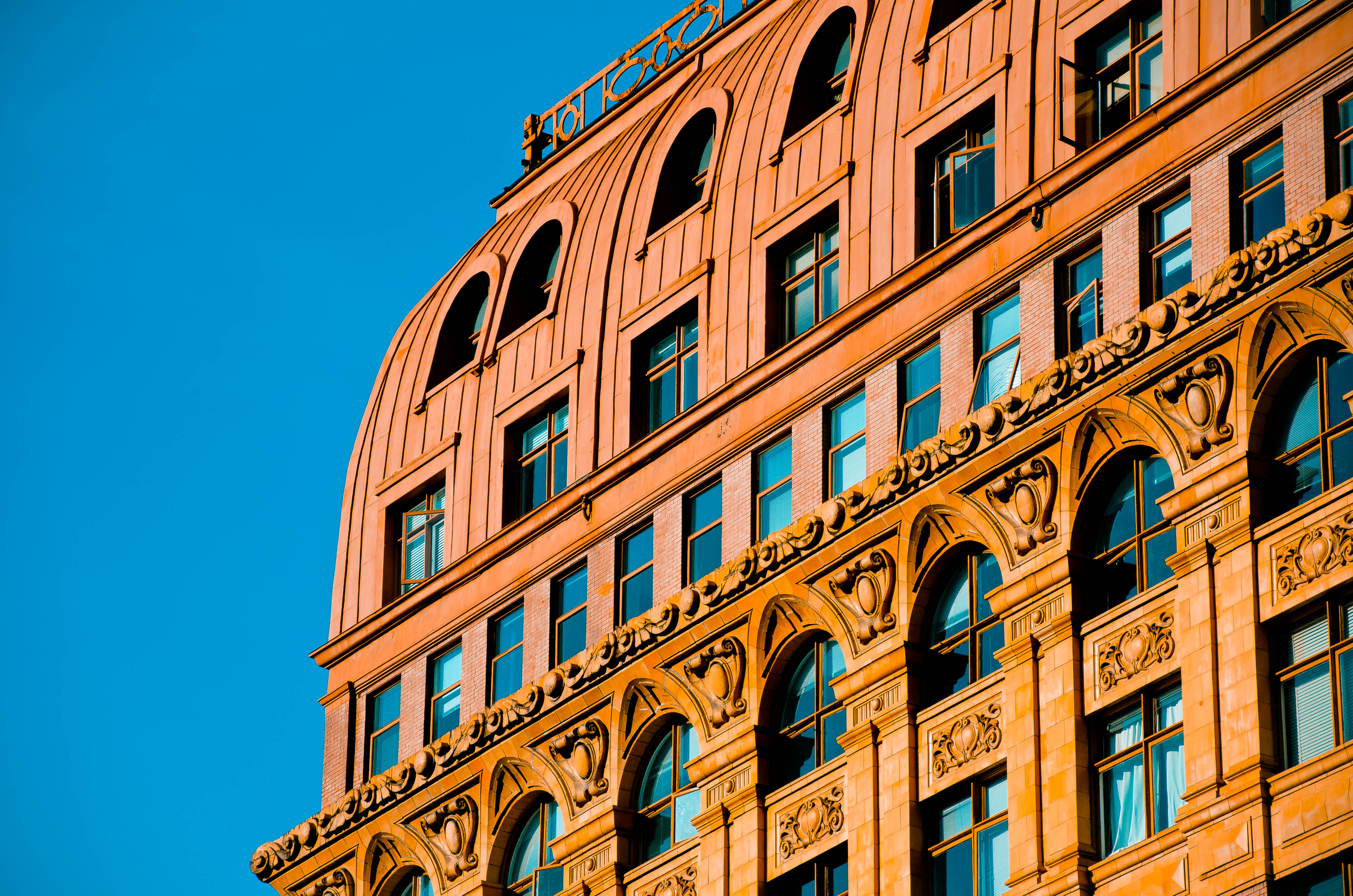
The climactic sniper scene in the second episode was filmed atop the Toronto-Dominion Bank Building in Vancouver.

In November 2011, Elizabeth Sarnoff, co-creator of the series, stepped down as executive producer. She remained as an "executive consultant".

The show was filmed in Vancouver and San Francisco. Scenes from the second episode prominently feature Vancouver's Toronto-Dominion Bank and Vancouver Film School, as well as backdrops of the port facilities.

== Connection to the actual prison ==
The series renewed the public's interest in the actual Alcatraz prison, so much so that the National Park Service had to install warning signs for its public tours. Fans of the TV series broke away from tours in an attempt to find the "nerve center" that is shown underneath the prison on the show. The signs state: "The TV show Alcatraz is fictional. Many areas it depicts are not real. Closed areas protect you, historic structures and nesting birds."

== International distribution ==
Region	Channel	Premiere date	Ref.
Arab world	MBC Action	January 19, 2012	
Argentina	Warner Channel	January 23, 2012	
Armenia	Armenia 1	January 8, 2014	
Australia	Nine Network	February 13, 2012	
Belgium	VIER and RTBF	March 26, 2012	
Brazil	Warner Channel, SBT	January 23, 2012; December 9, 2012	
Canada (English)	City	January 16, 2012	
Canada, Quebec (French)	Ztélé	January 30, 2013	
Denmark	Kanal 5	March 11, 2012	
Estonia	Kanal 2	November 27, 2012	
Finland	Sub	September 2, 2012	
France	NT1	January 12, 2013	
Germany	RTL Nitro	September 19, 2012	
Greece	Star Channel	September 1, 2016	
Hong Kong	TVB Pearl	September 18, 2012	
Hungary	Cool	June 17, 2013	
India	Star World	November 10, 2012	
Ireland	Watch and RTÉ	March 13, 2012	
Israel	HOT	March 2012	
Italy	Premium Crime	January 30, 2012	
Latin America, except Argentina, Brazil	Warner Channel	January 22, 2012	
Netherlands	Net5	March 16, 2013	
New Zealand	TV One	December 5, 2012	
Norway	TVNorge	February 9, 2012	
Pakistan	Star World	November 10, 2012	
Poland	Platforma n VOD	February 6, 2012	
Philippines	CHASE on BEAM 31	February 18, 2012	
Portugal	RTP2	March 16, 2012	
Romania	Jurnal TV	May 3, 2014	
Russia	TV-3 (Russia)	July 5, 2013	
Slovakia	Markíza	June 30, 2013	
South Africa	M-Net and M-Net HD	May 29, 2012	
Spain	TNT (pay)	January 17, 2012	
Spain	La Sexta (free)	February 8, 2012	
Sweden	TV4	April 9, 2012	
Thailand	True Series	June 17, 2012	
Turkey	DiziMax	January 21, 2012	
United Kingdom	Watch	March 13, 2012	

== Home media ==
Warner Home Video released the entire series in DVD and Blu-ray Disc formats on October 16, 2012. Both the three-disc DVD and two-disc Blu-ray sets featured deleted scenes, a gag reel, the "Alcatraz: Island of Intrigue" featurette of the cast and crew, and a 6-page full-color collectible booklet. The United States Blu-ray version also featured digital UltraViolet versions of each episode.

== Reception ==
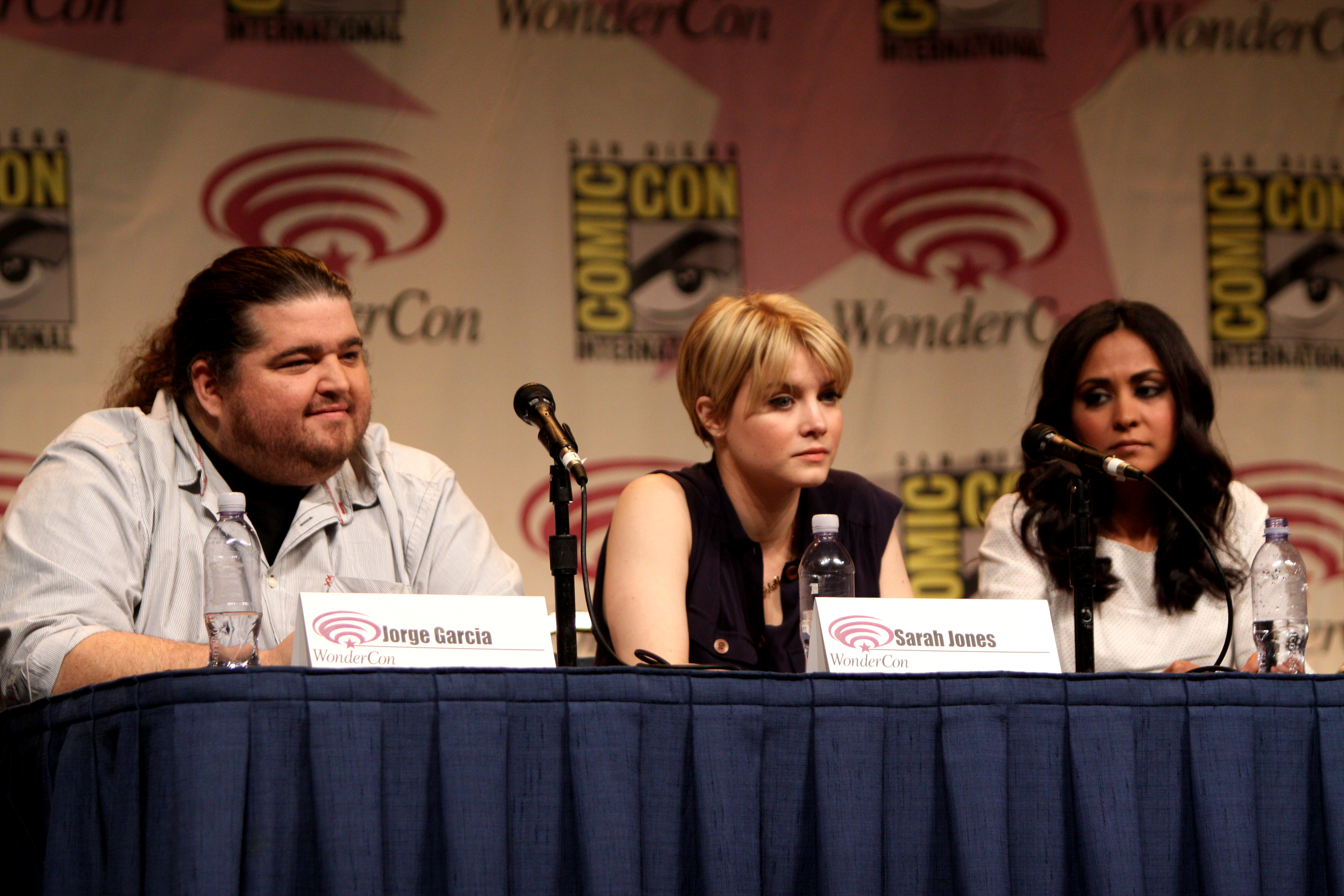
Jorge Garcia, Sarah Jones and Parminder Nagra at WonderCon 2012 in promotion of Alcatraz.

In June 2011, Alcatraz was one of eight honorees in the Most Exciting New Series category at the 1st Critics' Choice Television Awards, elected by journalists who had seen the pilots. The series holds a 60% approval rating on review aggregator Rotten Tomatoes, based on 35 critic reviews. The website's critics consensus reads, "Though it involves a mysterious and intriguing premise, Alcatraz delivers the plot through lumbering, humorless means." On Metacritic, which uses a weighted average, the series holds a score of 62/100 based on 29 critics, denoting "generally favorable reviews". Newsday's Verne Gay liked the series, but stated "'Traz' shares some of the DNA of The 4400 (of all shows) with a strand or two stripped from the genetic code of FlashForward. Love all these aforementioned worthies." Robert Bianco of USA Today wrote: "Alcatraz is easy enough to follow, with twists and surprises that are enjoyable and not enervating. But you still may leave it wondering how long it will be before there are eight timelines and six universes." New York's Matt Zoller Seitz panned the series, saying, "The characters are so TV cute (and in some cases TV pretty) and the storytelling so mechanical, that I couldn't give myself over to it either way."

The series opened with over 10 million U.S. viewers, but for the season finale, it had decreased to 4.75 million U.S. viewers, the series' lowest viewership. In the UK, the pilot episode debuted on March 15, 2012, with 496,000 viewers, marking UKTV's Watch channel's highest debut for the time-slot since 2011's Dynamo: Magician Impossible.

=== U.S. ratings ===
Season	Episodes	Timeslot (ET/PT)	Premiered		Ended		TV season	Rank	Viewers (in millions)
Season	Episodes	Timeslot (ET/PT)	Date	Premiere viewers (in millions)	Date	Finale viewers (in millions)	TV season	Rank	Viewers (in millions)
1	13	Monday 9:00 PM	January 16, 2012	10.05	March 26, 2012	4.75	2011–12	#46	9.56

=== Awards ===
In 2011, the series was honored, along with seven others, with the Critics' Choice Television Award for Most Exciting New Series.
