= Max Wright =

American actor (1943–2019)

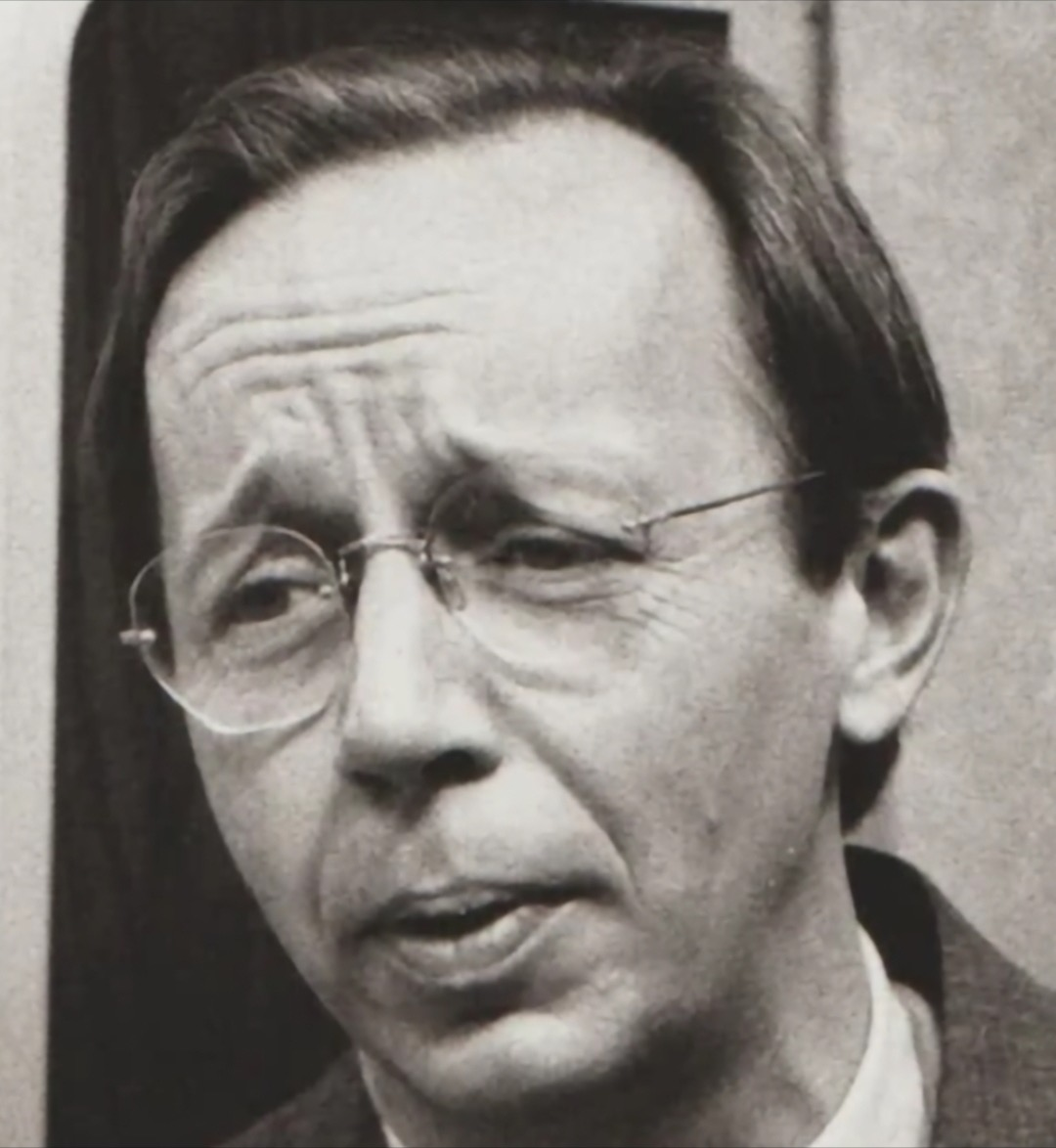
- Wright in Buffalo Bill, 1983
- Born: George Edward Wright; August 2, 1943; Detroit, Michigan, U.S.
- Died: June 26, 2019 (aged 75); Englewood, New Jersey, U.S.
- Occupation: Actor
- Years active: 1968–2011
- Spouse: Linda Ybarrondo (m. 1965; died 2017)
- Children: 2

George Edward "Max" Wright (August 2, 1943 – June 26, 2019) was an American actor, known for his role as Willie Tanner on the sitcom ALF (1986–1990).

== Early life ==
Wright was born August 2, 1943, in Detroit, Michigan, as George Edward Wright. He took the nickname "Max" as other actors were already known as George Wright.

He moved to the suburb of Southfield as a child, graduating from Southfield Senior High School in 1961. While a student at Southfield, he was very active in the theatre program and had leads in two different musical productions.

== Career ==
=== Early film and television ===
Wright made supporting appearances on television shows such as WKRP in Cincinnati and Cheers, and was a regular cast member on Misfits of Science, AfterMASH, and Buffalo Bill. He had roles in the films All That Jazz (1979), Reds (1981), The Sting II (1983), and Soul Man (1986), and played Dr. Josef Mengele in the 1980 TV movie Playing for Time.

=== ALF ===
From 1986 to 1990, Wright appeared in the sitcom ALF as Willie Tanner, a typical father of a middle-class family, who finds an alien who has crash-landed on Earth. Despite this becoming his best-known performance, the actor despised the role due to its huge technical demands and the fact that he, a human, played a supporting character for an "inanimate object". "It was hard work and very grim", he stated in a 2000 interview to People. He was also, reportedly, very happy when the show was canceled in 1990. "I was hugely eager to have it over with", he said in the same interview. According to his co-star in the show, Anne Schedeen, "there was one take, and Max walked off the set, went to his dressing room, got his bags, went to his car, and disappeared. Nobody had to say, 'Wrap', and there were no goodbyes". However, Wright later admitted that as the years passed he looked back at ALF with less animosity and conceded that "It doesn't matter what I felt or what the days were like, ALF brought people a lot of joy."

=== Later film and television ===
Wright's later appearances included Murder, She Wrote, Quantum Leap, Murphy Brown, Early Edition, and the first and second seasons of the sitcom Friends as Terry, the manager of Central Perk. He also appeared as Dr. Herbert Denninger in the 1994 made-for-TV adaptation of Stephen King's The Stand, Berger in the 1994 film The Shadow, the inspector in the 1995 film Grumpier Old Men, Günter Wendt in the 1998 HBO miniseries From the Earth to the Moon, and Norm's boss in the sitcom The Norm Show.

=== Stage ===
Wright also had a stage career. In 1968, he appeared in the original production of The Great White Hope at the Arena Stage in Washington, D.C. In 1998, he appeared on Broadway in Ivanov, which garnered him a Tony nomination, and played Sir Andrew in Twelfth Night at Lincoln Center for the Performing Arts. In 2007, he acted at the JET (Jewish Ensemble Theatre) in Detroit and in the production of No Man's Land at the American Repertory Theater. He also appeared in The Public Theater's 2010 production of The Winter's Tale and The Merchant of Venice at Shakespeare in the Park festivals.

== Personal life ==
Wright was married to Linda Ybarrondo from 1965 until her death from breast cancer in 2017. The couple had two children.

=== Legal issues ===
On January 10, 2000, Wright was arrested and charged for alleged DUI following a non-injury car accident in Hollywood. He was later released on a bail of $7,500.

On August 26, 2003, Wright was arrested and charged for alleged DUI for driving through New York state after running over some mailboxes and a traffic sign. His license was suspended for six months. He was booked into the Columbia County Jail and posted bail a month later on September 30, 2003.

== Death ==
In 1995, he was diagnosed with lymphoma, which was successfully treated and remained in remission until 2019. He died from the disease on June 26, 2019, at the age of 75 at the Lillian Booth Actors Home in Englewood, New Jersey.

== Filmography ==
=== Film ===
Year	Title	Role	Notes	Ref.
1979	Last Embrace	Second Commuter	Mystery-thriller film directed by Jonathan Demme; Based on the novel The 13th Man by Murray Teigh Bloom	
1979	All That Jazz	Joshua Penn	Drama-musical film directed by Bob Fosse and written by Robert Alan Aurthur & Fosse	
1980	Simon	Leon Hundertwasser	Comedy-science fiction film directed and written by Marshall Brickman	
1981	Reds	Floyd Dell	Biographical-historical drama directed by Warren Beatty and written by Beatty & Trevor Griffiths	
1983	The Sting II	Floor Manager	Crime film directed by Jeremy Paul Kagan	
1985	Fraternity Vacation	Millard Tvedt	Comedy film directed by James Frawley	
1986	Touch and Go	Lester	Romantic film directed by Robert Mandel	
1986	Soul Man	Dr. Aronson	Comedy film directed by Steve Miner	
1988	Going to the Chapel	Howard Haldane	Comedy film directed by Paul Lynch	
1994	The Shadow	Berger	Action-adventure film directed by Russell Mulcahy	
1995	Grumpier Old Men	County Health Inspector	Comedy film directed by Howard Deutch	
1999	A Midsummer Night's Dream	Robin Starveling	Comedy film directed and written by Michael Hoffman; Based on William Shakespeare comedic play of the same name	
1999	Snow Falling on Cedars	Horace Whaley	Mystery film directed by Scott Hicks and written by Ron Bass & Hicks; Based on the novel of the same name by David Guterson	
2002	Easter	Zaddock Pratt	Comedy film directed and written by Richard Caliban; Based on Will Scheffer's play of the same name	

=== Television ===
Year	Title	Role	Notes	Ref.
1974	Great Performances	Etienne	Episode: "In Fashion"	
1977	Red Alert		TV movie	
1980	Playing for Time	Dr. Mengele	TV movie	
1981	For Ladies Only	Shakespeare Director	TV movie	
1982	Hart to Hart	Dr. Robert Chase	Episode: "Hart of Diamonds"	
1982	CBS Afternoon Playhouse		1 episode	
1982	WKRP in Cincinnati	Frank Bartman	2 episodes	
1982	Taxi	Mr. Ambrose	Episode: "The Road Not Taken: Part 2"	
1983	Tales from the Darkside	Mr. Bundle	Episode: "Trick or Treat" (Pilot)	
1983–1984	Buffalo Bill	Karl Shub	25 episodes	
1984	AfterMASH	Burt Philbrick	Episode: "Less Miserables"	
1984	The Boy Who Loved Trolls	Secretary	TV movie	
1984	E/R	Marvin Brock	Episode: "Mr. Fix-It"	
1985	Scandal Sheet	Stan Clark	TV movie	
1985	Code Name: Foxfire		1 episode, Episode: "Slay It Again, Sam"	
1985	Benson	Bernard	Season 6 episode 19 "Mid-life Cowboy"	
1985	Konrad	Dr. Al Monford	TV movie	
1985	Misfits of Science	Dick Stetmeyer	TV movie	
1985–1986	Misfits of Science	Dick Stetmeyer	15 episodes	
1986	Cheers	Jim Fleener	2 episodes	
1986	Comedy Factory		Episode: "The Faculty"	
1986	Liberty	Alexandre Gustave Eiffel	TV movie	
1986–1990	ALF	Willie Tanner	99 episodes	
1987	Faerie Tale Theatre	Prince Heinrick	Episode: "The Dancing Princesses"	
1988	Five to Eleven	Reader	Episode: "Oh How Pleasant to Know Mr. Lear!"	
1991	Murder, She Wrote	Gerald Yelverton	Episode: "The Taxman Cometh"	
1992	Ghostwriter	Mr. Brinker	4 episode	
1992	Quantum Leap	Doc Kinman	2 episodes	
1992	The Powers That Be	Justice Reynolds	Episode: "Sophie's Big Decision"	
1993	Dudley	Paul	6 episodes	
1993	Murphy Brown	Marshall Corwin	Episode: "All the Life That's Fit to Print"	
1993	Roc	Mr. Cole	Episode: "Shove It Up Your Asprin"	
1994	Monty	Wild, Wild Willy	Episode: "Wild, Wild Willy and His O.K. Corral"	
1994	The Stand	Dr. Herbert Denninger	1 episode	
1994	White Mile	Bill Spencer	TV movie	
1995	A Mother's Gift	Herman Mandelbrot	TV movie	
1994–1995	Friends	Terry	2 episodes	
1996	The John Larroquette Show	Jackson Bishop	Episode: "Some Call Them Beasts"	
1996	Aaahh!!! Real Monsters	Herbie Hinkle (voice)	Episode: "You Only Scare Twice"	
1996	Early Edition	Mayor Mike Garfield	Episode: "Thief Swipes Mayor's Dog"	
1996	High Incident	Gass	Episode: "Change Partners"	
1997	Dead by Midnight	Dr. Jonas Reilly	TV movie	
1998	From the Earth to the Moon	Guenter Wendt	Episode: "We Have Cleared the Tower"	
1998	Twelfth Night, or What You Will	Sir Andrew Aguecheek	TV movie	
1998	Mad About You	Man in Elevator	Episode: "Season Opener"	
1999	The Drew Carey Show	Drew's Stomach	Episode: "Drew's Stomachache"	
1999–2001	The Norm Show	Max Denby	49 episodes	
2003	A Minute with Stan Hooper	The Mayor	Episode: "Stan Hooper Goes to Washington"	
2005	Back to Norm	Uncle Joe	TV movie, final film role	

== Stage ==
Year	Title	Role(s)	Venue	Notes	Ref.
1968	The Great White Hope	Mr. Coates, reporter, German officer	Alvin Theatre	Broadway debut	
1971	The Taming of the Shrew	Grumio	Guthrie Theater		
1974	Leonce and Lena	performer	Arena Stage		
1974	Horatio	Phrenologist	Arena Stage		
1975	The Ascent of Mount Fuji	Mainbet Abavev	Arena Stage		
1976	Heartbreak House	Mazzini Dunn	Arena Stage		
1976	Waiting for Godot	Didi	Arena Stage		
1976	Our Town	performer	Arena Stage		
1977	The Cherry Orchard	Semyon Panteleyevich Yepikhodov	Vivian Beaumont Theater		
1977	The Basic Training of Pavlo Hummel	Parker	Longacre Theatre		
1978	Stages	Arnold Glickman, Father, Jack, Trooper	Belasco Theatre		
1978	Once in a Lifetime	Lawrence Vail	Circle in the Square Theatre	Theatre World Award	
1978	The Inspector General	Iván Alexándrovich Khlestakóv	Circle in the Square Theatre		
1979	Richard III	Second Murderer	Cort Theater		
1980	A Midsummer Night's Dream	Francis Flute	American Repertory Theater		
1980	Happy End	Bob Marker	American Repertory Theater		
1980	The Inspector General	Mayor	American Repertory Theater		
1980	Lunch Hour	Leo	Ethel Barrymore Theatre		
1981	Henry IV, Part 1	Glendower	Delacorte Theater		
1982	The Front Page	Endicott	Long Wharf Theatre		
1992	What the Butler Saw	Dr. Prentice	La Jolla Playhouse		
1995	Denial	Professor Bernard Cooper	Long Wharf Theatre		
1997	Ivanov	Pavel Lebedev	Vivian Beaumont Theater	Tony Award nomination Drama Desk Award nomination	
1998	Twelfth Night	Sir Andrew Aguecheek	Vivian Beaumont Theater		
1998	The Cripple of Inishmaan	Johnnypateenmike	Geffen Playhouse		
1999	The Taming of the Shrew	Christopher Sly	Delacorte Theater		
2005	Happy End	Narrator	Pacific Resident Theatre		
2007	No Man's Land	Spooner	American Repertory Theater	Elliot Norton Award	
2010	The Winter's Tale	Old Shepherd	Delacorte Theater		
2010	The Merchant of Venice	Prince of Aragon	Delacorte Theater		
