= Barry Del Sherman =

American actor

- Born: November 10, 1962 (age 63); Fontana, California, U.S.
- Occupation: Actor
- Years active: 1989-present
- Spouse(s): Alexandra Powers (m. 1993–199?) Georgina Reskala (m. 2005)

Barry Del Sherman (born November 10, 1962) is an American stage, film, and television actor.

== Career ==
Sherman is known for roles in such films as Clive Barker's Lord of Illusions; Brad Dupree, the executive who fires Lester Burnham (Kevin Spacey) in American Beauty; and H. B. Ailman, Daniel Plainview's (Daniel Day-Lewis) business partner in There Will Be Blood.

His television acting includes guest appearances on Law & Order, Law & Order: Criminal Intent, CSI: NY, and The Bridge.

Sherman has appeared onstage in Marlane Meyer's The Mystery of Attraction at Tribeca Playhouse in New York and Pierre Marivaux's The False Servant at Odyssey Theater in Los Angeles.

== Personal life ==
Sherman has been married to actress Alexandra Powers in 1993 and is married to Georgina Reskala since 2005.

== Filmography ==
=== Film ===
| Year | Title | Role |
|---|---|---|
| 1992 | Another Girl Another Planet | Bill |
| 1994 | Reality Bites | Grant's Producer |
| 1995 | Lord of Illusions | Butterfield |
| 1996 | Independence Day | Street Preacher |
| 1997 | Picture Perfect | Groom |
| 1997 | Suicide Kings | Window Washer |
| 1998 | Almost Heroes | Sergeant |
| 1998 | Dante's View | Aysa |
| 1999 | Mascara | Ken |
| 1999 | American Beauty | Brad Dupree |
| 1999 | If... Dog... Rabbit... | Robber #1 |
| 2000 | The Specials | Zip Boy |
| 2002 | Easter | Matthew Ransom |
| 2004 | Kinsey | IU Reporter #1 |
| 2007 | There Will Be Blood | H.B. Ailman |
| 2009 | Gary's Walk | Todd |
| 2012 | On the Road | Dynamite Truck Driver |
| 2013 | Night Moves | Corser |
| 2015 | Yosemite | Daniel |
| 2015 | Street Level | Cyrus Gilbey |

=== Television ===
| Year | Title | Role | Notes |
|---|---|---|---|
| 1989 | Alien Nation | Executive | Episode: "Fountain of Youth" |
| 1990, 2008 | Law & Order | Bob Munsen / William Harriman Jr. | 2 episodes |
| 1991 | Darrow | Richard Loeb | TV movie |
| 1997 | The Big Easy | Lester | Episode: "A Streetcar with Desire" |
| 1998 | Cracker: Mind Over Murder | Jimmy Cliff | Episode: "If: Part 1" |
| 1998 | The Naked Truth | The Clerk | Episode: "8 1/2" |
| 2001 | A Woman's a Helluva Thing | Johnny | TV movie |
| 2002 | Guide Season | Terry Woodrow | TV movie |
| 2003 | Law & Order: Criminal Intent | Brent Anderson | Episode: "Gemini" |
| 2003 | 10-8: Officers on Duty | Fred Evans | Episode: "The Wild Bunch" |
| 2004 | CSI: NY | Richard Smockton | Episode: "Officer Blue" |
| 2012 | FutureStates | Simon Ender | Episode: "Life Begins at Rewirement" |
| 2014 | The Bridge | Newspaper Guy | Episode: "Harvest of Souls" |
| 2014 | Saint Francis | Jerry | TV movie |
| 2025-2026 | Chicago PD | Raymond Bell | 3 Episodes |
