= Good Guys and Bad Guys =

- Big Love episode
- Episode no.: Season 2 Episode 7
- Directed by: Michael Lehmann
- Written by: Mark V. Olsen; Will Scheffer
- Cinematography by: William H. Wages
- Editing by: Meg Reticker
- Original release date: July 23, 2007
- Running time: 52 minutes

Guest appearances
- Bruce Dern as Frank Harlow; Mary Kay Place as Adaleen Grant; Jim Beaver as Carter Reese; Aaron Paul as Scott Quittman; Luke Askew as Hollis Green; Mireille Enos as Kathy Marquart; Sandy Martin as Selma Green; Mike Pniewski as Holy Priest; Bonnie Bedelia as Virginia "Ginger" Heffman

Episode chronology
← Previous "Dating Game"	Next → "Kingdom Come"

"Good Guys and Bad Guys" is the seventh episode of the second season of the American drama television series Big Love. It is the nineteenth overall episode of the series and was written by series creators Mark V. Olsen and Will Scheffer, and directed by Michael Lehmann. It originally aired on HBO on July 23, 2007.

The series is set in Salt Lake City and follows Bill Henrickson, a fundamentalist Mormon. He practices polygamy, having Barbara, Nicki and Margie as his wives. The series charts the family's life in and out of the public sphere in their suburb, as well as their associations with a fundamentalist compound in the area. In the episode, Margene's mother comes to visit, not knowing that Margie and Bill are polygamists. Meanwhile, Roman finds that the Greenes are targeting him.

According to Nielsen Media Research, the episode was seen by an estimated 1.87 million household viewers and gained a 0.9/3 ratings share among adults aged 18–49. The episode received extremely positive reviews from critics, who praised the storylines and performances.

== Plot ==
Margie (Ginnifer Goodwin) is surprised when her mother, Ginger (Bonnie Bedelia), unexpectedly shows up at her house. Ginger meets her baby, but is not aware of the family's polygamy, so Margie introduces Bill (Bill Paxton) simply as her husband. Bill and Margie also decide that Ginger needs to properly know Barbara (Jeanne Tripplehorn) and Nicki (Chloë Sevigny) before finally revealing their status.

Despite the threat on his life, Bill still wants to get the Weber Gambling venture. He lies to Hollis (Luke Askew) by claiming that Roman (Harry Dean Stanton) refused the deal, alarming Don (Joel McKinnon Miller) and Reese (Jim Beaver). That night, Bill and Margie make a good impression on Ginger, although Ginger later sees Bill kissing Barbara in the lips. When Ginger complains to Nicki about what she saw, Nicki suddenly reveals the family's secret, upsetting Ginger. Bill is also visited by Scott (Aaron Paul), who not only reveals that he is in a relationship with Sarah (Amanda Seyfried), but that Alby (Matt Ross) has been stalking them. Bill confronts Alby at the motel, and warns him to stay away from Sarah.

Frank (Bruce Dern) returns and visits Lois (Grace Zabriskie) to discuss her new business with Eddie, but Lois kicks him out. Barbara is asked by Joey (Shawn Doyle) to pick up Wanda (Melora Walters) from the hospital, promising to arrive soon, and she agrees without informing Bill. She arrives just as Frank is confronting Wanda over poisoning him, but he is forced to leave when Lois threatens him with a shotgun. That night, they are joined by Kathy (Mireille Enos), when the lights suddenly go off. They deduce Frank was involved, until Joey finally arrives and reunites with his wife. The following day, Barbara leaves back for Salt Lake City.

Roman returns to his office, finding Adaleen (Mary Kay Place) bound and gagged with a cassette. The Greenes take responsibility for the attack, prompting Roman to mandate a curfew and issue an emergency UEB meeting. Seeing the blockade in the outskirts, Barbara returns to confront Roman over exposing him, and he claims he did to make their presence more accepted in the city. At the meeting, which Bill and Frank attend, Roman declares that they will cut ties to the Greenes. The episode ends as Barbara returns home and prays for Bill's safety.

== Production ==
=== Development ===
The episode was written by series creators Mark V. Olsen and Will Scheffer, and directed by Michael Lehmann. This was Olsen's eleventh writing credit, Scheffer's eleventh writing credit, and Lehmann's second directing credit.

== Reception ==
=== Viewers ===
In its original American broadcast, "Good Guys and Bad Guys" was seen by an estimated 1.87 million household viewers with a 0.9/3 in the 18–49 demographics. This means that 0.9 percent of all households with televisions watched the episode, while 3 percent of all of those watching television at the time of the broadcast watched it. This was a slight decrease in viewership from the previous episode, which was watched by an estimated 1.92 million household viewers with a 0.9/3 in the 18–49 demographics.

=== Critical reviews ===
"Good Guys and Bad Guys" received extremely positive reviews from critics. Trish Wethman of TV Guide wrote, "As menacing as Roman can be, he still pales in comparison to the recently resurrected Greenes. It looks like Bill is getting ready to enter into a dangerous game pitting these families against each other. Tonight he proclaimed, "I'm the good guy." However, with each passing week, the lines are blurring."

Emma Pearse of Vulture wrote, "The Sopranos-ification of polygamist Utah hit a high in this week's episode of Big Love, and while it may be shameless — get your own plots! — it also added fire to the show's typical soapy family juice-fest."

Emily St. James of Slant Magazine wrote, "If “Good Guys and Bad Guys” didn't hit the heights that the last four or five episodes hit, it at least moved a lot of the show’s pieces further on up the game board. Next week's episode looks as if it will bring several plot points to a head, so here’s hoping it's able to bury some of the show's less-interesting aspects." Shirley Halperin of Entertainment Weekly wrote, "If there was any doubt as to whether Big Love deserves to stand alongside HBO's great serial dramas, then this episode — and, judging by the preview, next week's — wipes it all away. There's some serious set-up going on here. We've got mysterious characters engaging in all kinds of violence, emotions running high, sympathies divided and evolving, loyalties tested... This is what drama is all about."

Jen Creer of TV Squad wrote, "I think the show is heading for a Holy War, and all of them are going to be sorely tested. It's always great to see Bruce Dern, and he is like the kindling for the fire. He ignited something in this episode." Television Without Pity gave the episode a "C+" grade.

Bruce Dern submitted this episode for consideration for Outstanding Supporting Actor in a Drama Series, while Bonnie Bedelia submitted it for Outstanding Guest Actress in a Drama Series at the 60th Primetime Emmy Awards.
