= Easter (film) =

- Directed by: Richard Caliban
- Screenplay by: Will Scheffer; Richard Caliban
- Based on: Easter by Will Scheffer
- Produced by: Will Scheffer; Mark V. Olsen; Christine K. Walker; Ezra Swerdlow
- Starring: Jodie Markell; Barry Del Sherman; Sean Runnette; Max Wright
- Cinematography: Claudio Rocha
- Edited by: Susan Littenberg
- Music by: Jeff Danna
- Production companies: Anima Sola Productions, Inc.
- Release date: September 21, 2002; Temecula Valley International Film Festival (premiere)
- Running time: 92 minutes
- Country: United States
- Language: English
- Budget: $500,000 (estimated)

Easter is an independent film based on the play by the same name by Will Scheffer. It is directed by Richard Caliban who also wrote the screenplay with Will Scheffer, and stars Jodie Markell, Barry Del Sherman, Sean Runnette, and Max Wright in his final film role before his death in June 2019.

== Plot ==
Wilma (Jodie Markell) and Matthew (Barry Del Sherman) Ransom are a married couple trying to escape their past, but it always catches up with them.

Wilma struggles with indulging in her fantasies, causing her to see Herman Warm Sean Runnette. She drives into town and stops at a local church where she buys a used wedding dress. Next she buys candles and religious supplies from an old shopkeeper named Zaddock Pratt Max Wright. Around this time, Matthew drives by the church to notice it's on fire due to arson. He quickly realizes that his wife is back to her old tricks of burning churches.

Matthew confronts Wilma about the burning church, and she tells him the reason why she burns churches. She blames him for the death of their child that she miscarried, telling him she hates him.

== Production ==
Filmed during the summer of 2000, the filmmakers had the assistance and supervision from the Hastings Fire Department in the burning of an actual farmhouse. The burning of the church was accomplished using visual effects.

== Filming locations ==
Easter takes place in and around the fictional town of Prattsville, but was shot in Hastings and Harvard, Nebraska. The football game flashback was filmed at Hastings High School.

== Reception ==
In his review of Easter for Variety on April 23, 2003, Todd McCarthy noted that the film had been "Transferred from the 1997 Off Broadway stage production with playwright Will Scheffer, director Richard Caliban and leading lady Jodie Markell all remaining on board" and concluded that [the] "Sub-Tennessee Williams portrait of a troubled woman losing her moorings to reality doesn’t make a true emotional connection for a moment."

== Awards ==
- Telluride Indiefest 2003 - Best Feature
- Empire State Film Festival 2003 - Silver Torch and Best Actress awards
