= The Loss of a Teardrop Diamond =

- Theatrical release poster
- Directed by: Jodie Markell
- Screenplay by: Tennessee Williams
- Produced by: Brad Michael Gilbert; Robbie Kass; Brad Stokes; Roxanna Raanan
- Starring: Bryce Dallas Howard; Chris Evans; Ellen Burstyn; Ann-Margret; Will Patton; Mamie Gummer; Jessica Collins
- Cinematography: Giles Nuttgens
- Edited by: Susan E. Morse; Jeremy Workman
- Music by: Mark Orton
- Production company: Constantin Film
- Distributed by: Screen Media Films
- Release dates: September 12, 2008 (Toronto International Film Festival); December 30, 2009 (United States)
- Running time: 102 minutes
- Country: United States
- Language: English
- Budget: $6.5 million

The Loss of a Teardrop Diamond is a 2008 American romantic drama independent film by director Jodie Markell. It is based on Tennessee Williams' long-forgotten 1957 screenplay, and stars Bryce Dallas Howard in the leading role of Fisher Willow. The film was released on December 30, 2009, making it the last film to be released in the 2000s.

== Plot ==
Heiress Fisher Willow reluctantly returns home to Memphis after studying abroad to participate in the tradition of presentation into society at her elderly aunt's request.

Fisher’s father is hated, having intentionally blown up part of his levee, resulting in deaths and property damage to others. Combined with her own inappropriate behavior, no man is willing to escort Fisher to the society parties. Jimmy accepts Fisher's offer to pay him to be her escort for the season. The great grandson of a former governor, Jimmy's family is poor, his father is an alcoholic who temporarily works for Mr. Willow and his mother is in a mental institution. Fisher borrows $10,000 teardrop diamond earrings from her aunt.

At the first society party, Fisher causes a scene when she has the band play jazz music and dances in "flapper" fashion. A woman calls Fisher the murderer’s daughter, and the partygoers laugh at her when she trips down the stairs.

The only other party that Fisher is invited to is hosted by her friend Jules. As he waits for Fisher to pick him up, Jimmy mentions to his father Fisher has been hinting that she wants to be intimate, which could lead to marriage, a permanent job for his father, and better care for his mother.

On the way to the party, Fisher asks Jimmy to pull over. She moves to kiss him, but is embarrassed when he pulls back. Arriving at the party, Fisher becomes frantic when realizing one of the teardrop earrings has fallen out. She then becomes hysterical when Jimmy sees Vinnie, Jules' cousin and his former girlfriend. Fisher demands that Jimmy search the area, then asks him to check his pockets. Entering the party, he demands to be searched to clear his good name.

At the same time, Fisher is called upstairs by her friend's Aunt Addie, bedridden from multiple strokes. Addie says she senses a kindred spirit in her. She points to a bottle on the shelf, asking her to give her all of the pills to die and stop the pain. Fisher agrees, but is interrupted by Vinnie telling her that Jimmy was searched and the earring was not on him. She leaves her remaining earring, promising Addie that when she comes back to get it, she will give her the pills.

Jimmy, angry at Fisher's accusation of theft, tells everyone that she paid him to be her escort, then openly flirts with Vinnie. When the partygoers begin to play a kissing game, Jules gives Fisher the highest card so that she can call Jimmy outside and kiss him, but she hides in the bathroom. She finds a bottle of medicine containing opium and drinks it. Now in a haze, she tells everyone that she was in a mental institution rather than college. Jimmy then uses his turn to ask Vinnie outside to kiss.

Vinnie takes Jimmy to a car where they have sex. She tells him she had turned down an offer of marriage because she wants him. She then reveals she found the missing teardrop diamond on the ground, knows that Addie has the other, and says that they could run away together with the money. Jimmy tells her that they may be poor, but they still have honor, but she refuses to return it. He goes to find Fisher, who argues that they should leave immediately. As they argue, Vinnie returns the earring to her. Fisher then runs back upstairs and fulfills her assisted-suicide promise to Addie, while Vinnie tells Jimmy that she has no choice but to marry the man that asked her.

On the way home, Fisher asks Jimmy to stop. Standing together, she admits he is the only man she wants. When she reaches up to touch his face, he pulls away again. Heartbroken, Fisher turns to walk away, but Jimmy grabs her hand – a silent agreement to her proposal.

== Cast ==
- Bryce Dallas Howard as Fisher Willow
- Chris Evans as Jimmy Dobyne
- Ellen Burstyn as Miss Addie
- Ann-Margret as Aunt Cornelia Fisher
- Mamie Gummer as Julie Fenstermaker
- Will Patton as Old Man Dobyne
- Jessica Collins as Vinnie McCorkle
- Susan Blommaert as Addie's Nurse
- Peter Gerety as Mr. Van Hooven
- Marin Ireland as Esmeralda
- Zoe Perry as Mathilde

== Production ==
Tennessee Williams wrote The Loss of a Teardrop Diamond in 1957; at that time, director Elia Kazan (who previously worked with Williams on A Streetcar Named Desire and Baby Doll) was attached to the project, reuniting with Williams for a third time. Kazan, however, went to work on other projects. Williams was interested in casting Julie Harris in the lead role. He continued to work on the script as late as 1980; it was published after his death.

Jodie Markell recalled how she first became aware of the script: "I had been interested in Tennessee Williams since I was a teenager. I'd read a lot of his work, everything I could find. I grew up in Memphis, Tennessee, and it really spoke to me. When I was in acting school one of my teachers showed me a collection of his screenplays, and when I read The Loss of a Teardrop Diamond I couldn't believe it had never been made. I really related to the character, Fisher Willow – mostly in her struggle to be heard in a society that keeps those who are more sensitive, more perceptive, more artistic, more romantic, witty – those people, he had an affinity for. He makes us understand them, he makes us see their vulnerabilities."

Markell then sought out the rights to do the film from Williams' estate. She was fairly young, and at the time the estate was extremely tight and not giving the rights to a lot of Williams' work. Markell said, "In time things changed, and the people who were in control of the rights changed, and we kept approaching them every few years with producer Brad Gilbert, who was really great and obtained the rights eventually. Together, we sought out the actors we wanted and the project started to come alive and the financing came together." Markell filmed in CinemaScope to evoke the rich coloration of Williams films of the 1950s, and was at pains not to make a film that was "dusty and overbaked, like so many Williams productions you see these days."

In November 2006, it was announced that Lindsay Lohan was going to play the lead role, but in March 2007, Bryce Dallas Howard was under negotiations for Lohan's role and went on to be cast. However, Markell later stated that the casting of Lohan never happened; that the reported announcement was an error by the press. Howard was her first choice, and later went on to be cast. Shooting for the film began on August 13, 2007 in Baton Rouge, Louisiana.

== Reception ==
On Rotten Tomatoes the film has an approval rating of 27% based on 41 reviews with an average rating of 4.37 out of 10. The website's critics consensus reads: "Stodgy and dispiritingly old-fashioned, Teardrop Diamond proves to be no big loss." On Metacritic, the film has a weighted average score of 51 out of 100, based on 15 critics, indicating "mixed or average reviews".

Mick LaSalle in the San Francisco Chronicle writes, "Even though Howard never quite gets it, never quite releases into the role and never quite convinces, she never makes a mistake, either." Roger Ebert of the Chicago Sun-Times gave the film 3 out of 4 stars and wrote: "It has been filmed in a respectful manner that evokes a touring production of an only moderately successful Broadway play. Understand that, accept it, and the film has its rewards and one performance of great passion."
