= Vision Thing (Big Love) =

- Big Love episode
- Episode no.: Season 2 Episode 5
- Directed by: Burr Steers
- Written by: Eileen Myers
- Cinematography by: M. David Mullen
- Editing by: Meg Reticker
- Original release date: July 9, 2007
- Running time: 51 minutes

Guest appearances
- Brian Kerwin as Eddie; Jim Beaver as Carter Reese; Branka Katić as Ana; Aaron Paul as Scott Quittman; Tina Majorino as Heather Tuttle; Mireille Enos as Kathy Marquart; Audrey Wasilewski as Pam Martin

Episode chronology
← Previous "Rock and a Hard Place"	Next → "Dating Game"

"Vision Thing" is the fifth episode of the second season of the American drama television series Big Love. It is the seventeenth overall episode of the series and was written by Eileen Myers, and directed by Burr Steers. It originally aired on HBO on July 9, 2007.

The series is set in Salt Lake City and follows Bill Henrickson, a fundamentalist Mormon. He practices polygamy, having Barbara, Nicki and Margie as his wives. The series charts the family's life in and out of the public sphere in their suburb, as well as their associations with a fundamentalist compound in the area. In the episode, Bill finds himself attracted to a waitress, while Joey meets his potential new wife.

According to Nielsen Media Research, the episode was seen by an estimated 1.86 million household viewers and gained a 0.9/3 ratings share among adults aged 18–49. The episode received positive reviews from critics, who praised the character development in the episode.

== Plot ==
After discussing with Don (Joel McKinnon Miller) over their new gambling venture, Bill (Bill Paxton) becomes attracted to a waitress named Ana (Branka Katić). Meanwhile, Rhonda (Daveigh Chase) contacts Sarah (Amanda Seyfried) for help, and she stays with Scott (Aaron Paul) for a few days.

Lois (Grace Zabriskie) decides to get Wanda (Melora Walters) committed to a psychiatric hospital, and also hires a woman named Kathy (Mireille Enos) to take care of her baby. Upon discovering this, Joey (Shawn Doyle) asks Barbara (Jeanne Tripplehorn) for help. Bill and Don are informed that they must deliver upfront money within the following days to continue with the gambling venture, leading Don to question his involvement. Nicki (Chloë Sevigny) is upset that Wayne is being taught Catholicism at his parochial school. After complaining at the school, Nicki argues with Barbara and Margie (Ginnifer Goodwin) over staying at the school, as they paid too much money for Wayne's enrollment.

Barbara visits Wanda at the hospital, trying to get her into not letting Lois get a new wife for Joey. However, she is surprised when Wanda actually supports Kathy as Joey's new wife, as she will stay for a long time in the hospital. Barbara gets Bill to break the news to Joey, and decides to give him a new job. When Rhonda lies about Scott raping her, Sarah is forced to relocate her with Heather (Tina Majorino), much to Heather's chagrin. After Nicki decides to homeschool Wayne, he runs away from house, until the family finds him at a neighbor's house. This prompts Nicki to allow Wayne to continue going to school. After seeing Bill get Ana's phone number, Margie decides to visit her at her job.

== Production ==
=== Development ===
The episode was written by Eileen Myers, and directed by Burr Steers. This was Myers' third writing credit, and Steers' first directing credit.

== Reception ==
=== Viewers ===
In its original American broadcast, "Vision Thing" was seen by an estimated 1.86 million household viewers with a 0.9/3 in the 18–49 demographics. This means that 0.9 percent of all households with televisions watched the episode, while 3 percent of all of those watching television at the time of the broadcast watched it. This was a 14% increase in viewership from the previous episode, which was watched by an estimated 1.63 million household viewers with a 0.8/2 in the 18–49 demographics.

=== Critical reviews ===
"Vision Thing" received positive reviews from critics. Dan Iverson of IGN gave the episode a "good" 7 out of 10 rating and wrote, "While "Vision Thing" may not have been the most entertaining episode of Big Love this season, it definitely did a good job of continuing the show's storylines, while creating some new problems for the Henricksons. So don't get us wrong, we think that this show is technically a great show, but the entertainment derived from viewing Big Love is less than that of most of the other big programs on HBO. Still, those wanting a more low-key program on Monday nights, as well as a show with a realistic view of what it is to be in a family (as large and screwed up as it may be), than Big Love is definitely worth your time."

Trish Wethman of TV Guide wrote, "Having gone to Catholic school for 16 years, I could really sympathize with Nicky's plight tonight as she attempted to navigate the “black magic hocus pocus Catholic pageantry” of Wayne’s summer school. I will be the first to admit that it all must seem somewhat surreal, daunting and intimidating to an outsider, but I did think that Nicki let her paranoia get the best of her." Emily Nussbaum of Vulture wrote, "So this is how you pick up fourth wives? Over pie? Isn't that a little, we don't know, Freudian? Then again, as we watched Bill flirt, ringlessly, with his savvy waitress, it occurred to us that this was a man who already married his first wife's nurse and then their babysitter — making it awfully hard to differentiate Bill's notion of a polygamist calling from the nonmonogamous urges of your more ordinary traveling salesman."

Emily St. James of Slant Magazine wrote, "Big Love is at its best when it’s contrasting the notion of an individual with the notion of a larger organism. Usually, the show pits its individual characters up against their various creeds, but “Vision Thing” suggested that these individuals also have to work to differentiate themselves from the society they live in." Shirley Halperin of Entertainment Weekly wrote, "Gambling can certainly mean big bucks to a smart investor, but does Bill have the business acumen to spot a sure thing? Or will this backfire the way his attempt to infiltrate the UEB did? Then who will he drag down with him? Obviously, Eddie's not as liquid as he made himself out to be, and Bill is likely up to his eyeballs in debt. This latest venture could seriously jeopardize the Henricksons' livelihood."

Meredith O'Brien of TV Squad wrote, "Watching Margie, with her car full of kids, happen upon Bill flirting with Ana in the cafe, was heartbreaking. But in the final scene, Margie seemed happy, sitting at that same counter at the Wild Thyme Cafe & Bakery while Ana served her a piece of pie. Was it the prospect of no longer being the lowest ranking wife that brought a smile to Margie's lips?" Television Without Pity gave the episode a "B" grade.

Amanda Seyfried submitted this episode for consideration for Outstanding Supporting Actress in a Drama Series, while Brian Kerwin submitted it for Outstanding Guest Actor in a Drama Series at the 60th Primetime Emmy Awards.
