= Jodie Markell =

American actress and film director (born 1959)

- Born: April 13, 1959 (age 67); Memphis, Tennessee, U.S.
- Occupations: Actress, film director
- Years active: 1987–present

Jodie Markell (born April 13, 1959) is an American actress and film director.

== Career ==
Jodie Markell attended Northwestern University and studied at New York's Circle in the Square Theatre. As an actress, she has worked with theater directors such as John Patrick Shanley, John Malkovich, and Gary Sinise; film directors such as Woody Allen, Jim Jarmusch, and Barry Levinson; starred at Lincoln Center, The Public and Steppenwolf Theatre Company; and won an Obie. She is also a member of the Naked Angels.

She also directed the film The Loss of a Teardrop Diamond. The New York Times referred to the film as "the first major [Tennessee] Williams movie in decades — a reanimation of a film career that once rivaled his stage success." In a review for IFC.com, Neil Pedley said that Markell "couldn't make her debut with a sturdier piece of material than this recently unearthed screenplay of societal scandal and sexual jealousy."

== Filmography ==
=== Film ===
Year	Title	Role	Notes
1988	Vampire's Kiss	Joke Girl	
1988	Me and Him	Eileen	
1989	Mystery Train	Sun Studio Guide	
1991	Queens Logic	Inez	
1993	Point of No Return	Female Student	
1994	My Girl 2	Hillary Mitchell	
1994	Jimmy Hollywood	Casting Assistant	
1994	Insomnia	Veronica Treadwell	
1994	A Worn Path	Clinic Attendant	
1995	Safe	Anita	
2000	Drop Back Ten	Peggy	
2002	Hollywood Ending	Andrea Ford	
2002	Trapped	Mary McDill	
2002	Easter	Wilma Ransom	
2004	Noise	Margaret	
2005	12 and Holding	Teacher	
2005	Sweet Land	Donna Torvik	
2007	Joshua	Ruth Solomon	
2012	Keep the Lights On	Jill	
2019	The Dead Don't Die	Cat Lady on TV	
2019	The Rest of Us	Maddie's Mom	
2024	Heaven is Nobody's	Hekka	Short

=== Television ===
Year	Title	Role	Notes
1987	Crime Story	Waitress	Episode: "Fatal Crossroads"
1989	China Beach	Pam Klinger	Episode: "The World: Part 2"
1990	Monsters	Sue Weatherby	Episode: "Bed and Boar"
1991	The Days and Nights of Molly Dodd	Lillian	2 episodes
1992	Brooklyn Bridge	Phoebe	Episode: "On the Road"
1993	A Matter of Justice	Sandra	Television film
1994	Bakersfield P.D.	Brenda James	Episode: "The Psychic and the C-Cup"
1997, 2003, 2009	Law & Order	Sondra Benton, Mrs. Hitchens, Lorraine Flockhart	3 episodes
2002	Guide Season	Maryann	Television film
2006–2007	Big Love	Wendy Hunt	8 episodes
2010	The Good Wife	Sandy Gephart	Episode: "Nine Hours"
2014	Law & Order: Special Victims Unit	Lisa Moore	Episode: "Wednesday's Child"
