= Sarah Jones (screen actress) =

American actress

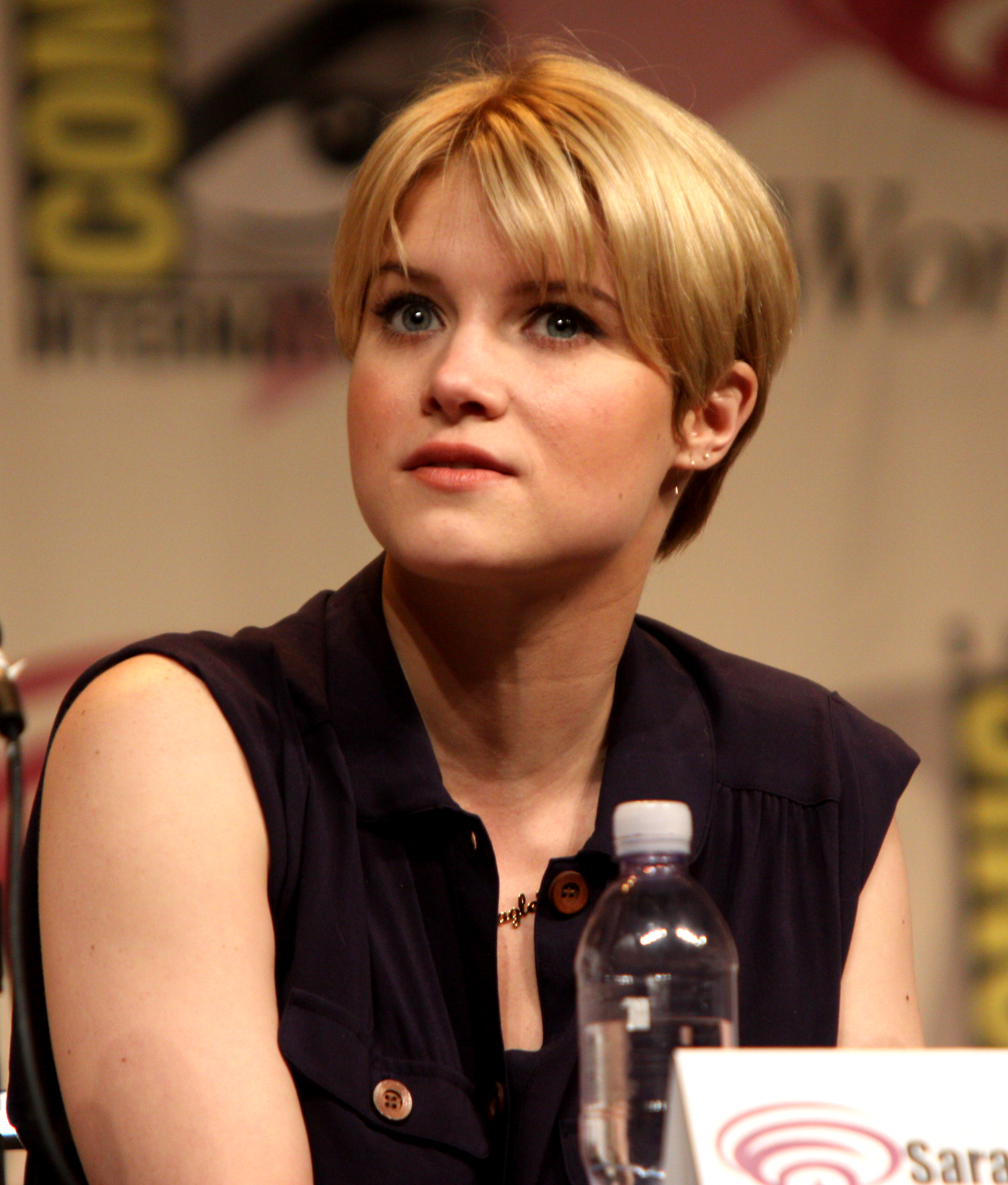
- Jones in 2012
- Born: Winter Springs, Florida, U.S.
- Occupation: Actress
- Years active: 2004–present

Sarah Jones is an American film and television actress. She began her screen career in 2004 with guest appearances on series such as Medical Investigation, Cold Case, and Judging Amy. She gained wider recognition for recurring roles on Huff, Ugly Betty, Big Love, and Sons of Anarchy, before starring as Detective Rebecca Madsen in the Fox series Alcatraz (2012). From 2019 to 2021, she played NASA astronaut Tracy Stevens in the Apple TV+ science fiction drama For All Mankind. Jones has also appeared in films including Still Green, for which she won a Spirit of the Independent Award for Best Ensemble, and Chemical Hearts (2020).

== Early life and education ==
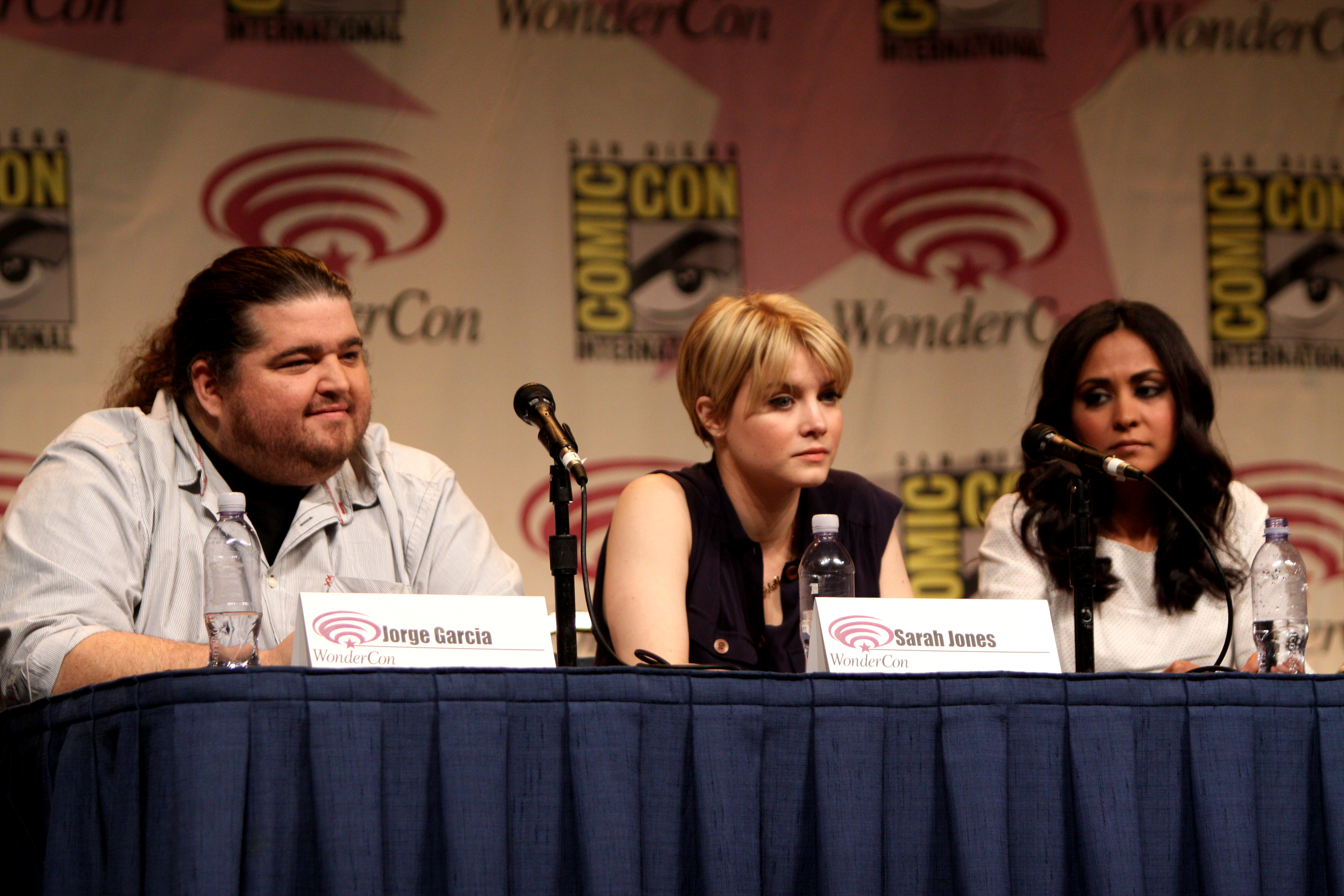
Sarah Jones, center, at WonderCon 2012 in promotion of Alcatraz.

Jones was born in Winter Springs, Florida, and graduated from Winter Springs High School in 2001. She "grew up dancing" with the expectation that it would become her career, but she turned to acting as "the next best thing" after her dancing ended because of injuries. She had gotten her first break working as a dancer for the MTV Movie Awards.

== Career ==
She began in acting with a role on Medical Investigation, before going on to appear in other television credited roles that same year, including episodes of Cold Case and Judging Amy, before she appeared in the 2007 Hallmark Channel movie, Murder 101: College Can Be Murder.

Jones also appeared in a recurring role as Leah on the television show Huff, guest-starred in a 2006 episode of Ugly Betty as Natalie Whitman, and Big Love as Brynn. She played the youngest of three sisters who run a wedding planner business in Fox's 2007 short-lived dramedy series The Wedding Bells. She also appeared in two independent movies, Still Green and The Blue Hour. Jones won the Spirit of the Independent Award at the Fort Lauderdale International Film Festival for Best Ensemble for Still Green (2007), which she shared with Ryan Kelley, Douglas Spain, Noah Segan, Paul Costa and the rest of the cast of the film. She can also be seen in the Cary Brothers music video Who You Are.

She portrayed Polly Zobelle, the scheming daughter and accomplice of Ethan Zobelle in Sons of Anarchy.

In 2011, she had a featured guest starring role in the FX crime drama Justified episode "The Life Inside". Other notable credits include a recurring role on Big Love and Lone Star. Jones then signed on to play the lead role of Det. Rebecca Madsen in the J. J. Abrams show, Alcatraz. Jones has received wide recognition for her portrayal. She took part in a recreation of the chase scene in Bullitt. The show premiered on January 16, 2012. While the series itself was moderately received, her performance was generally praised by critics. Despite an impressive start, the series was officially cancelled by Fox on May 9, 2012, due to dropping viewership throughout its run. However, Jones was featured in a May 2012 spread for Vanity Fair magazine, and she quickly returned to series television, being cast as a regular on Vegas.

She portrayed Alison in the hulu original series The Path, and Amelia Davenport in the USA Network TV series Damnation.

In 2018, Jones was cast as Lynn in CBS drama pilot L.A. Confidential, based on James Ellroy's 1990 novel of the same name.

In 2019, Jones starred as NASA astronaut Tracy Stevens in the Apple TV+ original science fiction space drama series For All Mankind. In 2021, Jones reprised her role in season 2.

== Personal life ==
Jones was dating Cary Brothers in 2007. She was dating fellow Sons of Anarchy actor Theo Rossi from 2010 until 2013. Jones describes herself as a feminist.

== Filmography ==
=== Film ===
Year	Title	Role	Notes
2006	Cain and Abel	Jennifer Proctor	
2007	The Blue Hour	Young Ethel	
2007	Still Green	Kerri	
2008	Dead*Line	Wendi	Short film
2011	Red & Blue Marbles	Kim	
2011	2ND Take	Charlie	
2013	Up the Valley and Beyond	Eve Turner	Short film
2013	Mr. Jones	Penny	
2014	Return to Zero	Dana	
2020	Chemical Hearts	Suds	
2025	The Last Rodeo	Sally Wainright	

=== Television ===
Year	Title	Role	Notes
2004	Medical Investigation	Belinda	Episode: "Little Girl"
2005	Cold Case	Ellie McCormick	Episode: "Revolution"
2005	Judging Amy	Natalie Johnson	Episode: "The New Normal"
2006	Sixty Minute Man	Cami	TV movie
2006	Huff	Leah	Recurring role; 4 episodes
2006	Ugly Betty	Natalie Whitman	Episode: "The Box and the Bunny"
2006–2007	Big Love	Brynn	Recurring role; 9 episodes
2007	Murder 101: College Can Be Murder	Danya Rosovitch	TV movie
2007	The Wedding Bells	Sammy Bell	Main role; 4 episodes
2008	The Riches	Rosaleen	3 episodes
2009	Love Takes Wing	Belinda	TV movie
2009	Love Finds a Home	Belinda	TV movie
2009	Sons of Anarchy	Polly Zobelle	Recurring role; 6 episodes
2010	House	Shannon	Episode: "Knight Fall"
2010	Lone Star	Gretchen	2 episodes
2011	Justified	Jamie Berglund	Episode: "The Life Inside"
2012	Alcatraz	Det. Rebecca Madsen	Main role; 13 episodes
2012	Kendra	Kendra	Main role; 8 episodes
2012–2013	Vegas	Mia Rizzo	Main role; 20 episodes
2013	Lauren	Kendra	2 episodes
2015	Texas Rising	Pauline Wykoff	Miniseries; 4 episodes
2016	The Path	Alison	Main role; 10 episodes
2017–2018	Damnation	Ameila Davenport	Main role; 10 episodes
2018	L.A. Confidential	Lynn	Main role (unsold pilot)
2019–2021	For All Mankind	Tracy Stevens	Main role; 20 episodes
2024	A Man in Full	Serena Croker	Main role
TBA	El Gato	Ashley	

== Awards ==
Year	Association	Category	Work	Result
2007	Spirit of the Independent Award	Best Ensemble	Still Green	Won
