= Larisa Oleynik =

American actress (born 1981)

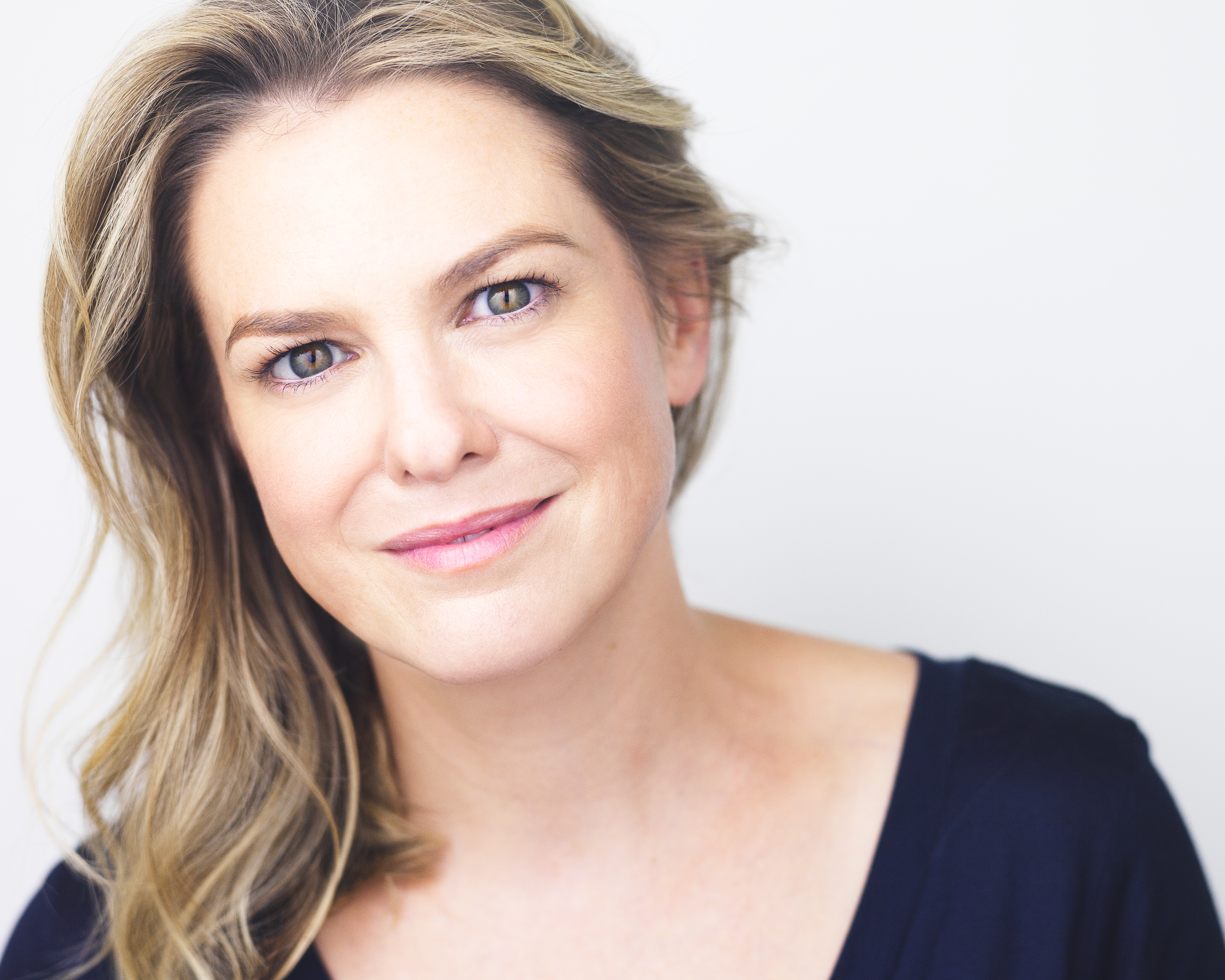
- Oleynik in 2020
- Born: Larisa Romanovna Oleynik; June 7, 1981 (age 45); Santa Clara, California, U.S.
- Education: Sarah Lawrence College
- Occupation: Actress
- Years active: 1989–present

Larisa Romanovna Oleynik (/ləˈrɪsə oʊˈleɪnɪk/; born June 7, 1981) is an American actress. Oleynik began her career as a child actor, first appearing onstage as young Cosette in a national touring production of Les Misérables (1989–1991). She was subsequently cast as the titular character in the Nickelodeon series The Secret World of Alex Mack, which aired from 1994 to 1998. She also began a film career, starring in an ensemble cast as Dawn Schafer in the film adaptation The Baby-Sitters Club (1995), and in a lead role in the teen comedy 10 Things I Hate About You (1999).

Oleynik subsequently had a supporting role in the comedy 100 Girls (2000), after which she starred opposite Nastassja Kinski and Scarlett Johansson in the period film An American Rhapsody (2001), and the independent drama Bringing Rain (2003). She later had supporting roles in Atlas Shrugged: Part II (2011) and the horror film Jessabelle (2014). From 2010 to 2015, she had a recurring role as Cynthia Cosgrove on the AMC series Mad Men, and a voice role as Icy on the Nickelodeon revival of Winx Club (2011–2014).

== Early life and education ==
Larisa Romanovna Oleynik was born in Santa Clara, California, (Note: Some sources erroneously state that Oleynik was born in San Francisco, including the Biography Today 1996 Annual Cumulation: Profiles of People of Interest to Young Readers (1996). CBS San Francisco stated in a 2011 article that Oleynik was born in the city of Santa Clara.) to Lorraine and Roy Oleynik. Her father was of Ukrainian ancestry. She was raised in the Eastern Orthodox tradition in the San Francisco suburb of Los Gatos. She graduated from the Pinewood School in Los Altos, California, in 1999. As her acting career flourished, she "divide[d] her time between normal childhood experiences in Northern California and auditions in Los Angeles".

After the success in her role as Alex Mack, Oleynik decided to attend college, enrolling at Sarah Lawrence College in Yonkers, New York, which she later described as "the best decision I've made".

== Career ==
=== 1989–2002 ===
Oleynik began acting in a San Francisco production of Les Misérables in 1989 after seeing an audition ad in a newspaper when she was eight years old. She obtained two parts in the production (young Cosette and young Eponine), the former a singing role. After appearing in the musical, she was referred to an agent by a Les Misérables co-star, Rider Strong, and began to take formal acting lessons. "I remember being 10 years old and thinking, 'I want to be good at this'... It wasn't about, 'I want to be on TV'. It was more looking around at the other kids and being like, 'I'm not good at sports, I'm not really smart. I think I could be good at this, though'."

Her onscreen acting career began at age 12, in a 1993 episode of the television series Dr. Quinn, Medicine Woman; the same year, she also appeared in the made-for-television film River of Rage: The Taking of Maggie Keene.

Later, in 1993, she was cast in the lead role of the series The Secret World of Alex Mack, where she portrayed a teenage girl who gains superpowers in a chemical accident. She won the role of Alex Mack over 400 other aspirants. The series ran on Nickelodeon from 1994 to 1998 and was one of the network's three most-watched shows, becoming quite a favorite among the child and teen audiences and turning Oleynik into a teen idol. During the show's heyday, children who met Oleynik (and were too young to understand special effects) would often ask her to "morph" for them. Rather than try to explain things, she would quickly glance around, then tell them, "Not here – everybody would see!". Oleynik reprised the role in an All That sketch, although the name was changed to "Alex Sax". She later made an appearance in the 100th episode of the show.

In 1996, she made a cameo on the series The Adventures of Pete & Pete as a nurse at the beginning of the episode "Dance Fever". Also during her time on The Secret World of Alex Mack, she played Dawn Schafer, one of the lead characters in the 1995 feature film The Baby-Sitters Club (1995), opposite Rachael Leigh Cook and Schuyler Fisk, and appeared in several episodes of Boy Meets World as Dana Pruitt, the girlfriend to Rider Strong's Shawn Hunter. She also wrote an advice column for Tiger Beat magazine, and was involved in Nickelodeon's The Big Help charity, Hands Across Communication, Surfrider Foundation and the Starlight Children's Foundation. She has also hosted the CableACE Awards, Daytime Emmy Awards, YTV Achievement Awards, The Nickelodeon Kids' Choice Awards as well as The Big Help. She has commented that she stayed "grounded" during her period as a teen star, mainly through the help of a "strong network of people" that she was close to.

After The Secret World of Alex Mack ended its run, Oleynik had a starring role in the film 10 Things I Hate About You as Bianca. The film was released in April 1999, and did fairly well at the box office, grossing a total of $38 million domestically. From 1998 to 2000, Oleynik appeared in twenty-one episodes of the NBC series 3rd Rock from the Sun as Alissa Strudwick. During 2000, she also appeared in two independent films: 100 Girls (opposite Emmanuelle Chriqui, Katherine Heigl and Jonathan Tucker) and A Time for Dancing (opposite Shiri Appleby); neither film received a theatrical release in the United States.

Oleynik had a supporting role in the independent drama film An American Rhapsody (2001), opposite Nastassja Kinski and Scarlett Johansson, which follows a young woman whose parents are forced to leave her behind in Communist Hungary while they flee to the United States.

=== 2003–present ===
Oleynik had a supporting part in Bringing Rain (2003), a low-budget teen drama starring Adrian Grenier and Paz de la Huerta, which premiered at the Tribeca Film Festival. In 2005, she appeared as a guest star on the series Malcolm in the Middle as Reese's lesbian army buddy who develops a crush on his mother. Oleynik was cast in a supporting role in the series Pepper Dennis, which began airing on The WB in April 2006, but was not picked up by The WB's successor The CW. The same year, she starred in the independent drama Pope Dreams.

In March 2008, Oleynik guest-starred in episode 13 of Aliens in America. In 2009, she provided audio commentary for the 10 Things I Hate About You 10th Anniversary Edition Blu-ray. In March 2011, Oleynik started appearing in a recurring role on Hawaii Five-0 as CIA analyst Jenna Kaye, until her character was later killed off. She was subsequently cast in the Ayn Rand adaptation Atlas Shrugged: Part II (2012), as Cherryl Brooks, a store clerk who becomes acquainted with the protagonist, Dagny Taggart (portrayed by Samantha Mathis). Oleynik also guest-starred as Ken Cosgrove's girlfriend (and later wife) Cynthia Baxter in several episodes on the AMC television series Mad Men.

In 2016, Oleynik starred in the one-woman show I Loved, I Lost, I Made Spaghetti at the Hangar Theatre in Ithaca, New York. Beginning in 2017, Oleynik starred in the Off-Broadway musical comedy Baghdaddy. In 2020, Oleynik starred in the Netflix family comedy series The Healing Powers of Dude. In 2023, it was announced that Oleynik was cast as Sylvia in the Nickelodeon comedy Erin & Aaron.

In 2026, Oleynik is set to perform in POTUS: Or, Behind Every Great Dumbass Are Seven Women at the Santa Fe Playhouse.

== Personal life ==
Oleynik resides in Venice, California. She said that her first kiss was with Rider Strong when she was an actress on Boy Meets World. She also says that he was her "first major crush."

In January 2013, she was granted a restraining order against a stalker, Josh Hathaway, who was so obsessed with her that he changed his last name to "Oleynik".

== Filmography ==
=== Film ===
Year	Title	Role	Notes	Ref.
1994	The Swan Princess	Pre-teen Odette	Voice role	
1995	The Baby-Sitters Club	Dawn Read Schafer		
1998	The Swan Princess: Sing Along	Pre-teen Odette	Voice role; short film	
1999	10 Things I Hate About You	Bianca Stratford		
2000	100 Girls	Wendy		
2001	An American Rhapsody	Maria Sandor (age 18)		
2002	A Time for Dancing	Jules Michaels		
2002	Speciale Casting	Jules Michaels	Archived; uncredited	
2003	Bringing Rain	Ori Swords		
2006	Pope Dreams	Maggie Venable		
2007	Relative Obscurity	Claire		
2008	Broken Windows	Sara		
2009	Together Again for the First Time	Brenda	Direct-to-video	
2009	I Have It	Emily	Short film	
2012	Born Yesterday	Elyse	Short film	
2012	Atlas Shrugged: Part II	Cherryl Brooks		
2012	Winx Club: The Secret of the Lost Kingdom	Icy	Voice; Nickelodeon English version	
2013	Winx Club 3D: Magical Adventure	Icy	Voice; Nickelodeon English version	
2013	OJ: The Musical	Regina		
2013	Remember Sunday	Lauren		
2014	BFFs	Chloe		
2014	The Mamet Women	Polly	Short film	
2014	Jessabelle	Sam		
2014	Horrible Parents	Jill	Short film	
2017	Wandering Off	Amanda		
2018	Accommodations	Natalie		
2019	Animal Among Us	Anita Bishop		
2019	Auggie	Hillary		
2021	We Broke Up	Tia		

=== Television ===
Year	Title	Role	Notes
1993	Dr. Quinn, Medicine Woman	Susie	Episode: "Heroes"
1993	River of Rage: The Taking of Maggie Keene	Gail Keene	TV film
1994–98	The Secret World of Alex Mack	Alex Mack	Lead role (78 episodes)
1995	All That	Alex Sax	Episode: "Larisa Oleynik/Da Brat"; sketch: "The Secret World of Alex Sax"
1996	The Adventures of Pete & Pete	Nurse	Episode: "Dance Fever"
1996–98	Boy Meets World	Dana Pruitt	3 episodes
1997	The Mystery Files of Shelby Woo	Gator World Employee	Episode: "The Alligator Mystery"; uncredited
1998–2000	3rd Rock from the Sun	Alissa Strudwick	Recurring role (21 episodes)
2005	Malcolm in the Middle	Abby Tucker	Episode: "Army Buddy"
2006	Katie Sullivan	Katie Sullivan	Unsold TV pilot; lead role
2006	Pepper Dennis	Brianna	2 episodes
2008	Aliens in America	Zoe	Episode: "Community Theater"
2009	Without a Trace	Liza Miller	Episode: "Voir Dire"
2009	Psych	Willow Gimbley/ Shawn Spencers Gal	Episode: "Let's Get Hairy"
2010	Backyard Wedding	Renee	TV film
2010–15	Mad Men	Cynthia Cosgrove	Recurring role (5 episodes)
2011–12	Winx Club: Enchantix	Icy / Various	Voice role (28 episodes)
2011–14	Hawaii Five-0	Jenna Kaye	Recurring role (7 episodes)
2012	Mike & Molly	Allison	Episode: "The Dress"
2012	Fairly Legal	Officer Glacki	Episode: "What They Seem"
2012–13	Winx Club: Beyond Believix	Icy / Various	Voice role (24 episodes)
2012–14	Pretty Little Liars	Maggie Cutler	Recurring role (7 episodes)
2012–14	Winx Club	Icy / Various	Voice role (52 episodes)
2013	Remember Sunday	Lauren	TV film
2013	Ghost Ghirls	Megan	Episode: "Will You Scary Me?"
2013	American Dad!	Super hot girl	Voice role; episode: "Steve and Snot's Test-Tubular Adventure"
2014	Robot Chicken	Alex Mack / Marcie / Classmate	Voice role; episode: "Rebel Appliance"
2014	Stolen from the Womb	Diane King	TV film
2014	Extant	Phillips	Episode: "Ascension"
2014	The Michaels	Katherine Bixby	TV film
2015	Wish Upon a Christmas	Amelia	TV film
2016	Law & Order: Special Victims Unit	Lizzie Bauer	Episode: "Assaulting Reality"
2018–19	Half Life	Patty	Lead role (4 episodes)
2019	Janice Gunter, Ghost Hunter	Leesa	Episode: "Psychic Development Class"
2019–20	Trinkets	Shawn	Recurring role (6 episodes)
2020	The Healing Powers of Dude	Karen Ferris	Main role (8 episodes)
2023	Erin & Aaron	Sylvia	Main role (13 episodes)

== Stage credits ==
Year	Title	Role	Notes	Ref.
1989–91	Les Misérables	Young Cosette / Young Eponine	Second national touring production	
2014	Be a Good Little Widow	Melody	NoHo Arts Center	
2016	I Loved, I Lost, I Made Spaghetti	Giulia	Hangar Theatre	
2017–18	Baghdaddy	Berry	St. Luke's Theatre	
2019	Miss Lilly Gets Boned	Miss Lilly	Rogue Machine Theatre	
