= Baghdaddy =

Baghdaddy, now titled Who's Your Baghdaddy, or How I Started the Iraq War, is a satirical musical comedy stage play with music and book by Marshall Paillet, lyrics and book by A. D. Penedo, based on an unproduced screenplay by J. T. Allen, and produced by Charlie Fink. The musical is based on historical events leading up to the 2003 invasion of Iraq by the United States, and focuses on how the CIA and BND (German intelligence service) provided the Bush administration with a justification for invading Iraq.

Baghdaddy was produced off-off-Broadway at The Actors' Temple in 2015. The production was critically acclaimed, and was dubbed a Critic's Pick by The New York Times. A new production opened off-Broadway at the St. Luke's Theatre on May 1, 2017.

Who's Your Baghdaddy, or How I Started the Iraq War, was produced in Australia in 2020 and streamed live online during the COVID-19 pandemic.

== Historical context ==
Near the opening of the show, the cast explains to the audience that some of the characters are loosely based on actual figures, while others are composites of multiple figures. The story hews closely to historical accounts of the period, particularly Bob Drogin's book Curveball: Spies, Lies, and the Con Man Who Caused a War (2007) and Frank Rich's book The Greatest Story Ever Sold: The Decline and Fall of Truth in Bush's America (2006).

The character "Curveball" is based on an actual Iraqi defector and BND informant, Rafid Ahmed Alwan al-Janabi, who was known by the Defense Intelligence Agency cryptonym "Curveball." The fictional character "Tyler Nelson" shares a first name and some biographical details with the late, retired CIA official Tyler Drumheller, while the character "Martin Bouchard" shares several biographical details with former UN Chief Weapons Inspector and Iraq Survey Group leader David Kay.

== Productions ==
=== Washington, DC production ===
In 2011, Baghdaddy premiered at the Capital Fringe Festival in Washington, DC, where it received the "Best Overall Production" award. It was directed by Marshall Pailet and arranged and music directed by Zak Sandler. It then played an extended run at the Woolly Mammoth Theatre. The show was produced under the title Who's Your Baghdaddy?

=== Off-Off-Broadway production ===
In 2015, Baghdaddy was produced Off-Off-Broadway at the Actors' Temple in New York City, also with the title Who's Your Baghdaddy? The production was critically acclaimed, with positive reviews from publications including Broadway World, the Voice of America, and Manhattan Digest. The New York Times dubbed Baghdaddy "An important, cunning, rock-solid musical comedy with a terrible title," and named it a Critic's Pick.

=== Off-Broadway production ===
In 2017, a production opened Off-Broadway at the St. Luke's Theatre in New York City. Previews began in April 2017, and the official opening was May 1, 2017. The production features much of the cast from the 2015 Off-Off-Broadway production (Brennan Caldwell, Jason Collins, Bob D'Haene, Brandon Espinoza, Claire Neumann, and Larisa Oleynik), and adds two new actors: Joe Joseph and Ethan Slater.

Australian Premiere - LIVE streamed production

In 2020, Curveball Creative produced a first of live musical theatre during the COVID-19 pandemic by isolating performers in a large house and having them perform to camera. After being performed between 24 and 28 June 2020, it remained available to stream online. The production was critically acclaimed and consisted of Neil Gooding directing the eight-person Australian cast, choreographed by Leah Howard and musically directed by Steven Kreamer. Including: Blake Erickson (Shrek The Musical), Doug Hansell (Come From Away), Phillip Lowe (Mamma Mia), Laura Murphy (Muriel’s Wedding), Matthew Predny (Kinky Boots), Adam Rennie (The Rocky Horror Show), Katrina Retallick (Come From Away), and Troy Sussman (Aladdin).

== Plot ==
The musical takes place in a narrative frame in which the cast and audience attend an AA-style support group for people who started the Iraq War. The cast includes CIA operatives, an Iraqi informant, and a BND operative.

The story focuses on the recruitment and eventual disgrace of an Iraqi defector, codenamed "Curveball," and the use and misuse of his testimony by the CIA, State Department, and Bush administration. In Baghdaddy, as in reality, Curveball provides Western intelligence agencies with false intelligence on Iraqi mobile weapons laboratories. This intelligence, which is later discovered to have been fabricated, was used by Secretary of State Colin Powell in his 2003 speech to the UN Security Council to justify the invasion of Iraq and overthrow of Saddam Hussein.

=== Act I ===
The show begins in a support group where Berry, Richart, and Nelson introduce themselves and recite the pledge ("The Pledge"). Martin walks into the meeting late, and after introducing himself, flashes back to the summer of 2001. A recently demoted Martin tries to convince Nelson to publish his compendium based on rumors of Saddam Hussein possessing germ weapons ("Marty's Dilemma"). Nelson, noting the lack of proof, tries to dissuade him from publishing the compendium on the internet. Martin publishes it anyway, justifying his actions ("We Deserve Better").

Several weeks later, an Iraqi man shows up at a Germany customs booth claiming to have important information for the CIA ("Stay Preprise"). At the BND, Richart begins another day as a Junior detective ("Das Man"), but gets assigned to interrogate the informant, codenamed Curveball, as he is the only operative that speaks Arabic. Richart interrogates Curveball, who warns him of mobile weapons labs and agrees to tell everything in exchange for asylum ("Stay"). Realizing how important this intel could be on a global scale, Richart contacts the CIA. ("I Deserve a Reprise").

At the CIA headquarters, outcast analysts Berry and Jerry lament being overlooked in their field. They receive a fax from Richart with Curveball's information ("Berry and the Bad Boy"). Thrilled at the opportunity for action, they bring the case to Nelson, but he asks for more proof before he can approve ("Rules"). He directs them to Martin, who, although wary of Nelson's involvement, joins the group in hopes of gaining credit for his compendium ("Berry's Dilemma"). Over the next month, Curveball slowly reveals his history with the mobile germ weapons, all of which line up with Martin's theories ("Hydrangea Reports").

While the team is optimistic, Jerry intentionally flubs a translation of a message from Richart to make Curveball seem like a reliable source. This leads to the CIA confirming the story and taking the case live. Jerry professes he lied to give Berry the big break she's always wanted ("We Deserve Another Reprise"). As the operatives celebrate their success, Richart begins to have doubts about how honest Curveball's story is ("Hydrangea Supplemental Report"). Jerry reevaluates what Berry means to him ("Music to Me"). Curveball and Richart have a night out in Berlin ("Who's Your Baghdaddy"), while the CIA agents receive word of a plane highjacking.

=== Act II ===
The people of America are outraged after the events of 9/11, vowing to have revenge on 'all terrorists' ("Change of Tone"). Nelson begins finding holes in Curveball's story and contacts Richart, who, although holding onto hope, is conflicted as the interrogations grow more aggressive ("Hydrangea Reports Reprise"). Berry, impatient with Nelson's system, goes behind his back and shares the case with the State Department. In an effort to stop the case from going off the rails, Nelson pleads to the Second-In-Command to shut it down ("The Second In Command"). When he is rejected, Nelson threatens to leak the inconsistencies of the case to the press, but hesitantly agrees to keep silent when offered the position of Second-In-Command.

Berry, Jerry, and Martin travel to Iraq to search warehouses for the weapons factory Curveball claimed to have built, but fail to find any weapons. In Germany, Richart searches for Curveball, who has fled the BND and is eventually found in a holding cell ("Martin's Search"). As Berry, Jerry, and Martin are on the way to speak with Curveball face-to-face in Germany, their car is ambushed and Jerry is shot and killed. Martin, Berry, and Richart realize Curveball's plan to memorize Martin's compendium and present it as fact ("Speak to Me Tomorrow"). The show ends where it began, with the support group members reciting the pledge ("The Pledge Reprise"). Martin walks into the meeting late, and when asked if he blames himself for these events, the lights dim.

== Songs ==
Act One	Act Two
"The Pledge" - Nelson, Richart, Berry, & Company; "Marty's Dilemma" - Bouchard & Ensemble; "We Deserve Better" - Bouchard, Richart, Berry, Jerry, Nelson, & Ensemble; "Stay Preprise" - Curveball; "Das Man" - Richart & Backups; "Stay" - Curveball; "I Deserve a Reprise" - Richart & Herr Gimmlevogut; "Berry and the Bad Boy" - Berry, Jerry, Ensemble & Richart; "Rules" - Nelson & Backups; "Berry's Dilemma" - Bouchard & Company; "Hydrangea Reports" - Curveball, Richart, & Ensemble; "We Deserve Another Reprise" - Bouchard, Richart, Berry, & Jerry; "Hydrangea Supplemental Report" - Richart; "Music to Me" - Jerry & Ensemble; "Who's Your Baghdaddy" - Richart, Curveball, Music Video Girls, Male Voice, & Ensemble	"Change of Tone" - Company, Dramatic News Reporter, Bouchard, & Ensemble; "Hydrangea Reports Reprise" - Richart & Curveball; "The Second In Command" - Nelson, Second In Command, & Servants; "Martin's Search" - Bouchard & Richart; "Speak to Me Tomorrow" - Curveball; "The Pledge Reprise" - Nelson, Richart, Berry, & Support Group Members

== Characters ==
- Martin Bouchard (50's - 60's) - Used to be a bigwig intelligence guy, now has fallen down several rungs on the ladder. Intelligent, but sometimes shortsighted in his quest to reclaim past glory. Bari-tenor.
- Richart Becker (20's) - A German junior interrogator. Young, ambitious, not as cool as he thinks. Looking for a friend. Tenor.
- Curveball (30's) - An Iraqi defector, and the only source on the biological Weapons of Mass Destruction. Enchanting, manipulative, unpredictable with a wild side. Tenor.
- Tyler Nelson (40's) - CIA operative, bureaucrat and consummate company man. Doesn't like to ruffle feathers. Bari-tenor.
- Berry Stanton (late 20's) - CIA analyst. Smart, abrasive, with minimal people skills. Mezzo-Soprano with belt.
- Jerry Samuel (late 20's) - CIA analyst and super geek. Socially awkward with a strong moral code for the most part. Secretly in love with Berry. Tenor.

== Cast ==
Character	Original off-off-Broadway cast	Original off-Broadway cast	Australian premiere
Martin Bouchard	Bob D'Haene	Bob D'Haene	Doug Hansell
Richart Becker	Brennan Caldwell	Brennan Caldwell	Matt Predny
Curveball	Nehal Joshi, Pomme Koch (standby)	Joe Joseph	Troy Sussman
Tyler Nelson	Jason Collins	Jason Collins	Phillip Lowe
Berry Stanton	Larisa Oleynik	Larisa Oleynik	Laura Murphy
Jerry Samuel	Olli Haaskivi	Ethan Slater	Adam Rennie
Female Ensemble Member	Claire Neumann	Claire Neumann	Katrina Retallick
Leader of the Support Group/Male Ensemble	Brandon Espinoza	Brandon Espinoza	Katrina Retallick
Male Ensemble Member	Brandon Espinoza	Brandon Espinoza	Blake Erickson
