= Ethan Slater =

American actor and singer (born 1992)

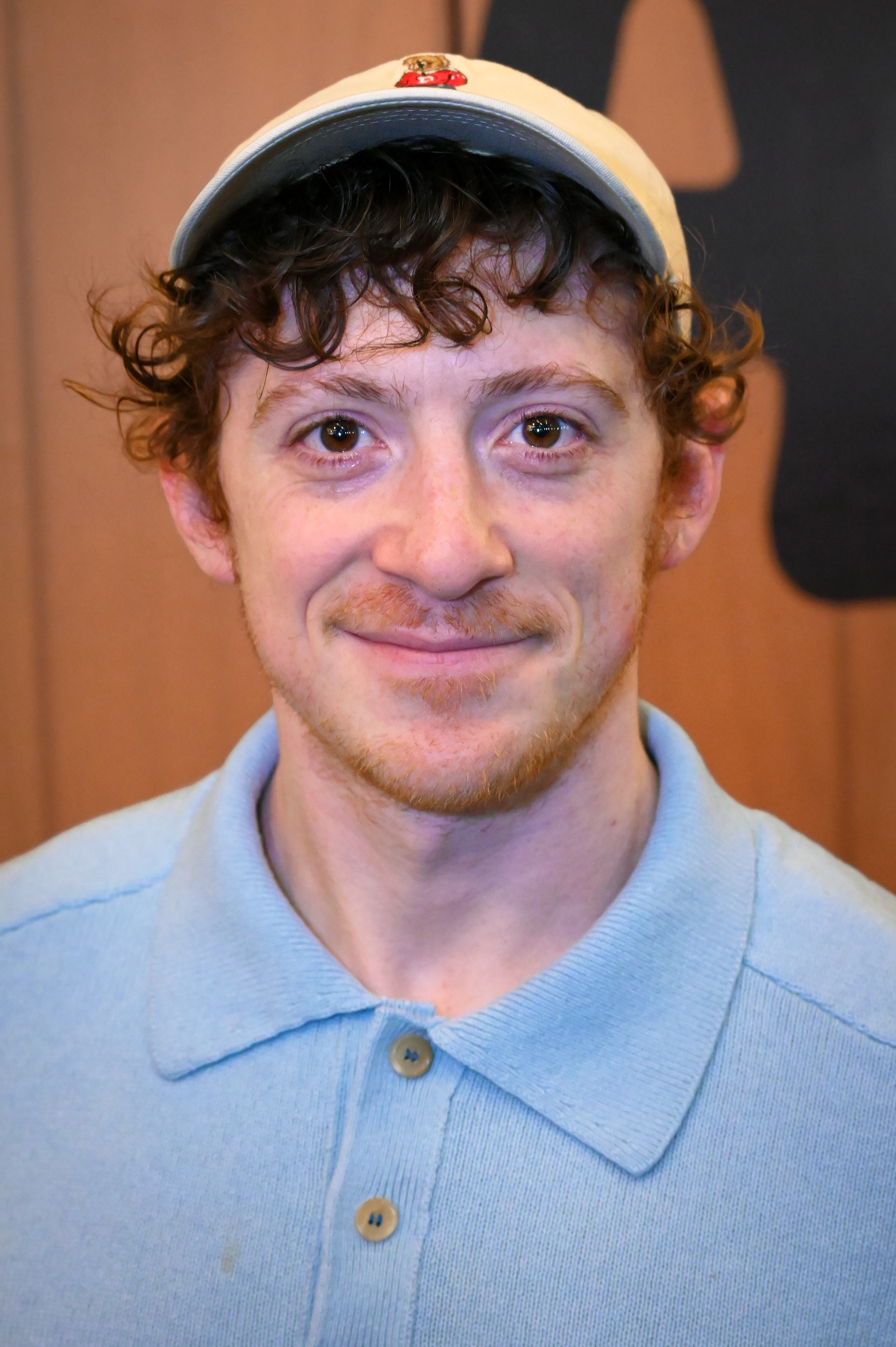
- Slater in 2025
- Born: Ethan Samuel Slater; June 2, 1992 (age 34); Washington, D.C., U.S.
- Education: Vassar College (BA)
- Occupations: Actor; singer
- Years active: 2012–present
- Spouse: Lilly Jay (m. 2018; div. 2024)
- Children: 1
- Website: www.ethanslater.com

Ethan Samuel Slater (born June 2, 1992) is an American actor and singer. He played the character of SpongeBob SquarePants in the 2016 musical of the same name, for which he won a Drama Desk Award and received a nomination for the Tony Award for Best Actor in a Musical. He played Boq Woodsman / The Tin Man in the musical films Wicked (2024) and Wicked: For Good (2025). He also portrayed Thomas Godolkin in the superhero series Gen V (2025), a role he will reprise in its prequel Vought Rising (2027). As a singer, he has released the extended plays Wanderer (2019) and Life Is Weird (2020).

== Early life and education ==
Ethan Samuel Slater was born on June 2, 1992, in Washington, D.C. He is the third child of Jay Slater, an employee at the Food and Drug Administration. He is Jewish and was raised Conservative, attending Ohr Kodesh in Silver Spring. After attending Charles E. Smith Jewish Day School, his family moved to Silver Spring, Maryland. Slater's mother died when he was 7, which he describes as a "really big, formative thing in my life. She had left this huge imprint on me, even though I had so few memories."

Slater graduated from Georgetown Day School in Washington, D.C., and studied drama at Vassar College in Poughkeepsie, New York. During his time in college, he auditioned to apprentice at a Shakespeare workshop, which then got him an audition in front of director Tina Landau. Slater graduated from Vassar with a Bachelor of Arts degree in Drama in 2014.

== Career ==
Slater's first theater appearance was at the New York Musical Theatre Festival in July 2015, in which he starred as Luis in the musical Claudio Quest, directed by John Tartaglia, earning a nomination for the festival's award in the category for Best Individual Performance. Between September 30 and October 24, 2015, he starred in Please Excuse my Dear Aunt Sally in the One Year Lease Theater Company. In December 2015, he joined the Delaware Theatre Company in Wilmington, acting in Barry Levinson's play Diner, directed and choreographed by Kathleen Marshall. During the same period he appeared in several short films, including Lightning Bugs in a Jar and Evol.

In 2016, Slater was cast in the lead role of SpongeBob SquarePants in Kyle Jarrow's musical of the same name and directed by Tina Landau at the Oriental Theatre in Chicago. The musical achieved success and was praised by theater critics, bringing the production to Broadway at the Palace Theatre in New York between 2017 and 2018. For his performance, Slater earned a Tony Award nomination for Best Actor in a Musical at the 72nd Tony Awards in 2018, winning Outstanding Actor in a Musical at the Drama Desk Awards and Outstanding Actor in a Musical at the Outer Critics Circle Awards. He was also awarded the Theatre World Award for Best Performance in a Broadway Debut in 2018.

Between 2018 and 2019, he appeared in several television series, including Law & Order: Special Victims Unit, Murphy Brown, Instinct, and The Marvelous Mrs. Maisel. On March 4, 2019, Slater was cast by director Bartlett Sher in the theatrical special of Camelot at Lincoln Center Theater in New York.

Between 2021 and 2022, he starred in the Classic Stage Company production of the musical Assassins, directed by John Doyle, at the Lynn F. Angelson Theater in New York, playing Lee Harvey Oswald. His performance earned him a Lucille Lortel Awards nomination for Best Performance. From March to April 2022, Slater originated the role of Max Weinbaum in the play Good Night, Oscar at the Goodman Theatre in Chicago. From 2023 to 2024, he played the Historian, Prince Herbert, and other roles in the Broadway revival of Spamalot at the St. James Theatre. He played Boq Woodsman in the two-part film adaptation of the musical Wicked, directed by Jon M. Chu. In July 2026, he is set to join the Off-Broadway revival cast of Little Shop of Horrors replacing Jordan Fisher as Seymour opposite Betsy Wolfe as Audrey.

== Personal life ==
In 2012, Slater began dating his former high school classmate, clinical psychologist Lilly Jay. They married in 2018 and their son was born in August 2022. They separated shortly before Slater filed for divorce in July 2023. Their divorce was finalized in September 2024.

In July 2023, Slater was confirmed to be in a relationship with singer Ariana Grande, whom he met on the set of Wicked. In June 2026, it was reported that Grande had ended the relationship quietly some months prior.

== Works ==
=== Film ===
Year	Title	Role	Notes	Ref.
2012	A Guy Walks Into a Bar	Young Man	Short film	
2015	Lightning Bugs in a Jar	Ben	Short film	
2016	Evol: The Theory of Love	Ronny		
2017	FunEmployment	Issac's Roommate	Short film	
2022	Intervenors	Miles	Short film and writer	
2024	Lost on a Mountain In Maine	Henry		
2024	Wicked	Boq Woodsman / The Tin Man	Also contributed to "Dancing Through Life" on the film's soundtrack	
2025	Wicked: For Good	Boq Woodsman / The Tin Man		
TBA	The Man Behind the Camera	Gerald	Completed	

=== Television ===
Year	Title	Role	Notes	Ref.
2018	Law & Order: Special Victims Unit	Riley Porter	Episode: "Revenge"	
2018	Murphy Brown	Officer Reynolds	Episode: "Thanksgiving and Taking"	
2019	Fosse/Verdon	Joel Grey	Episode: "Me and My Baby"	
2019	Instinct	Noah	Episode: "After Hours"	
2019	SpongeBob SquarePants	Himself	Episode: "SpongeBob's Big Birthday Blowout"	
2019	The SpongeBob Musical: Live on Stage!	SpongeBob SquarePants	Television adaptation of The SpongeBob Musical	
2023	The Marvelous Mrs. Maisel	Steven	Episode: "Susan"	
2025	Elsbeth	Officer Reese Chandler	3 episodes	
2025	Gen V	Thomas Godolkin	3 episodes	
2026	Sofia the First: Royal Magic	Nutmeg (voice)	Guest role	
TBA	Vought Rising	Thomas Godolkin		

=== Web ===
Year	Title	Role	Notes	Ref.
2015	Redheads Anonymous	Sam		
2015	New Mayor of New York	Nathan		

=== Theatre ===
Year	Production	Role	Venue	Category	Notes	Ref.
2015	Diner	Modell	Delaware Theatre Company	Regional		
2015	Claudio Quest	Luis	NYMF	Regional		
2015	Please Excuse My Dear Aunt Sally	Cast	59E59 Theatres	Off-Off-Broadway		
2016	The SpongeBob Musical	SpongeBob SquarePants	Oriental Theatre	Regional		
2017	Baghdaddy	Jerry Samuel	St. Luke's Theatre	Off-Broadway		
2017–2018	SpongeBob SquarePants: The Broadway Musical	SpongeBob SquarePants	Palace Theatre	Broadway		
2019	Camelot	Mordred	Lincoln Center Theater	Broadway Concert		
2021–2022	Assassins	The Balladeer / Lee Harvey Oswald	Classic Stage Company	Off-Broadway		
2022	Assassins	The Balladeer / Lee Harvey Oswald	Stephen Sondheim Theatre	Broadway Concert		
2022	Good Night, Oscar	Max Weinbaum	Goodman Theatre	Regional		
2023–2024	Spamalot	Prince Herbert / The Historian	St. James Theatre	Broadway		
2023	Gutenberg! The Musical!	The Guest Producer	James Earl Jones Theatre	Broadway	One night cameo	
2024	Edge of the World	Ben	Classic Stage Company	Off-Broadway	Also composer, lyricist, author	
2026	Marcel on the Train	Marcel Marceau	Classic Stage Company	Off-Broadway	Also author	
2026	Little Shop of Horrors	Seymour Krelborn	Westside Theatre	Off-Broadway		

== Discography ==
=== Cast recordings ===
Release date	Title	Type	Label	Ref.
September 22, 2017	SpongeBob SquarePants, The New Musical	Original Cast Recording	Masterworks Broadway	
September 28, 2018	Who's Your Baghdaddy, or How I started the Iraq War	Original Cast Recording	Broadway Records	
August 6, 2021	Edge of the World	Concept Album	Broadway Records	
March 18, 2022	Assassins	2022 Cast Recording	Broadway Records	

=== Solo recordings ===
Release date	Title	Notes	Ref.
February 5, 2019	Richmond Rewrites	Single	
July 11, 2019	Wanderer	EP	
July 21, 2020	Life Is Weird	EP	

== Awards and nominations ==
Year	Award	Category	Nominated work	Result	Ref.
2015	NYMF Award	Outstanding Individual Performance	Claudio Quest	Nominated	
2018	Tony Award	Best Actor in a Musical	SpongeBob SquarePants	Nominated	
2018	Drama Desk Award	Outstanding Actor in a Musical	SpongeBob SquarePants	Won	
2018	Outer Critics Circle Award	Outstanding Actor in a Musical	SpongeBob SquarePants	Won	
2018	Broadway.com Audience Awards	Favorite Breakthrough Performance (Male)	SpongeBob SquarePants	Won	
2018	Broadway.com Audience Awards	Favorite Leading Actor in a Musical	SpongeBob SquarePants	Won	
2018	Theatre World Award		SpongeBob SquarePants	Honoree	
2022	Lucille Lortel Award	Outstanding Featured Performer in a Musical	Assassins	Nominated	
2024	Alliance of Women Film Journalists	Best Ensemble Cast	Wicked	Nominated	
2024	Astra Film Awards	Best Cast Ensemble	Wicked	Nominated	
2024	Las Vegas Film Critics Society	Best Ensemble	Wicked	Nominated	
2024	Michigan Movie Critics Guild	Best Ensemble	Wicked	Nominated	
2024	New York Film Critics Online	Best Ensemble	Wicked	Nominated	
2024	San Diego Film Critics Society	Best Ensemble	Wicked	Nominated	
2024	Screen Actors Guild Awards	Best Ensemble	Wicked	Nominated	
2024	St. Louis Film Critics Association	Best Ensemble	Wicked	Nominated	
2024	Washington D.C. Area Film Critics Association	Best Acting Ensemble	Wicked	Nominated	
2026	Drama League Award	Outstanding Production of a Play	Marcel on the Train	Pending	
2026	Drama League Award	Distinguished Performance	Marcel on the Train	Pending	
