= Charlie Fink (producer) =

American film producer

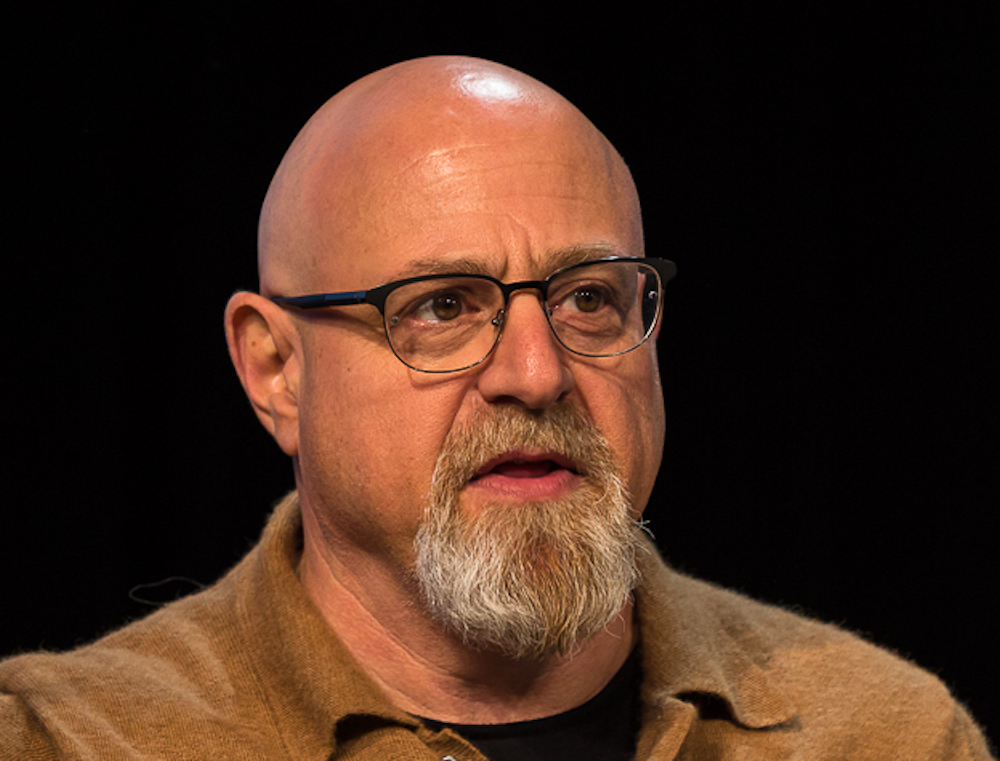
- Charlie Fink
- Education: The Art Institute of Chicago
- Occupations: Author, Executive

Charlie Fink is a former Disney executive. He was vice president for creative affairs at Disney for six years. He is credited for pitching the story "Bambi in Africa" which later became The Lion King (1994). In 1992, Fink was chief operating officer of the digital media company Virtual World Entertainment in Walnut Creek. He is also the author of two AR-enabled books.

== Career ==
Fink earned his BA Degree from Sarah Lawrence College and a Master of Fine Arts Degree from the Art Institute of Chicago.

In 1987, Fink started his career in the Animation Division of Walt Disney Pictures, where he rose to the position of vice-president. In his years with Disney, Fink developed The Lion King (1994), which was based on his idea, "Bambi in Africa".

In 1992, Fink left Disney to join the digital media company Virtual World Entertainment, a software developer and location-based Entertainment Company owned by Tim Disney.

In early 1996, Fink joined AOL as senior vice-president and chief creative officer of Greenhouse Networks, where he created and launched the service Santa's Home Page where kids could e-mail a letter to Santa Claus.

After leaving AOL in 1999, Fink founded eAgents.com, a daily email service, which was sold to American Greetings Interactive (AGI) in 2000. Fink served as President of American Greetings until 2003, and chairman until 2005. During his tenure, American Greetings acquired its two largest competitors, BlueMountain.com and eGreetings.com, and transitioned from a free site to a fee based subscription service with over five million paying subscribers.

Fink is the author of the AR-enabled books Charlie Fink's Metaverse, Convergence, How The World Will Be Painted With Data, and Remote Collaboration & Virtual Conferencing: The Future of Work. He is an adjunct faculty member teaching extended reality at Chapman University in Orange, California.

== Theatrical career ==
Charlie Fink is the founder and artistic director of the New Musical Foundation, which produces readings, workshops, and festival productions of new musicals. He was chairman of the board of New York Musical Theatre Festival (NYMF), from 2007 to 2017. He was honored at the 2017 NYMF gala alongside playwright Marsha Norman for his ten years of leadership.

Fink was previously honored in 2014 by No Rules Theater Company. Fink produced Who's Your Baghdaddy? at the Actor's Temple in New York City in 2015. The show nominated Best Musical by the Off-Broadway Alliance. The New York Times called the production "a cunning, rock-solid musical comedy with a terrible title". The show, its title shortened to Baghdaddy, was revived for a subsequent, limited run at St. Luke's Theater in New York City in March 2017. It played 46 performances and closed on July 2, 2017.
