= Joy Regullano =

American writer, actress and comedian

Joy Regullano is an American writer, actress, and comedian. Her acting credits include Crazy Ex-Girlfriend, Mythic Quest, Speechless, and Supernatural. She has written for the television shows The Healing Powers of Dude, Kung Fu Panda: The Dragon Knight, and Monsters at Work.

== Early life and education ==
Regullano was born in Los Angeles and raised in Buena Park, California. Her parents, both physicians, immigrated to the United States from the Philippines. She attended Sunny Hills High School and received her bachelor's degree from University of California, Berkeley, first as a molecular biology major with the intention of attending medical school. After a positive experience as a member of the Asian American Theatre Club, she switched her major to theatre.

== Career ==
Regullano's first professional acting role was as a character in the streaming series The Incredible Life of Darrell, produced under the Warner Bros. Digital Networks company Stage 13. She gained wider prominence in 2019 for the musical Supportive White Parents that she wrote and starred in. The autobiographical show tells the story of Regullano bucking her parents' expectations for her to follow in their footsteps and secure a career in medicine to instead pursue a career in the entertainment industry. She first performed some songs from the show at the Second City Hollywood. Supportive White Parents won two awards at the Hollywood Fringe Festival.

Regullano has acted in series including Barry, Crazy Ex-Girlfriend, Mythic Quest, Speechless, and Supernatural. She performs improv and sketch comedy at UCB and Second City Hollywood. She also performs with the variety show Asian AF, which was developed at UCB Theatre in Los Angeles. She has been a co-producer the spinoff variety show Filipino AF since 2017.

Regullano was an inaugural recipient of the Sesame Street Writers' Room fellowship in 2017. Her first screenwriting job was for the Netflix family series The Healing Powers of Dude. Regullano was a later a writer for Kung Fu Panda: The Dragon Knight, which was her first job in animation. She was next a staff writer for season two of Monsters at Work.

She debuted her show Body Count, a show about relationships, addiction, and family dysfunction, at Hollywood Fringe in 2024. Sika Lonner of Larchmont Buzz reviewed the show as "an affecting exploration of dependency and the possibility of healing." Regullano portrayed a lead role in the stage play The Heart Sellers by Lloyd Suh, which showed at Cape Rep Theatre in September 2024. She narrated the audiobook The Last Resort (Book 1) by Erin Entrada Kelly, which was released in September 2025.

== Accolades ==
- 2019 – Winner, Encore! Producers’ Award, Hollywood Fringe Festival (for Supportive White Parents)
- 2019 – Winner, Best of The Broadwater, Hollywood Fringe Festival (for Supportive White Parents)
- 2023 – Nominee, Children's & Family Emmy Award for Outstanding Short Form Program (for Sesame Street Coming Together: Word of the Day Series)
- 2026 – Winner, Local Comedic Acting, Cookies and Comedy Film Festival (for Te Seguiré a La Oscuridad)
