= Marcel on the Train =

2026 play

- Original language: English
- Written by: Ethan Slater and Marshall Pailet
- Subject: Marcel Marceau
- Genre: Drama
- Setting: Occupied France, 1943

Premiere
- Date: February 5, 2026
- Place: Classic Stage Company; New York

Marcel on the Train is a play by Ethan Slater and Marshall Pailet. It is based on the life of Marcel Marceau. It premiered at the Classic Stage Company in 2026 in a production starring Ethan Slater as Marceau.

== Production history ==
=== Off Broadway (2026) ===
The play premiered at the Classic Stage Company on February 5, 2026, running until March 22. The production was directed by Marshall Pailet and designed by Scott Davis, Sarah Laux, Studio Luna, and Jill BC Du Boff.

== Cast and characters ==
Character	Off Broadway
Marcel Marceau	Ethan Slater
Henri	Alex Wyse
Etiennette	Maddie Corman
Adolphe	Max Gordon Moore
Berthe	Tedra Millan
Everyone Else	Aaron Serotsky

== Awards and nominations ==
=== Off Broadway production ===
Year	Award	Category	Nominee	Result
2026	Drama League Awards	Outstanding Production of a Play		Pending
2026	Drama League Awards	Outstanding Direction of a Play	Marshall Pailet	Pending
2026	Drama League Awards	Distinguished Performance	Ethan Slater	Pending
2026	Outer Critics Circle Awards	Outstanding Lighting Design	Studio Luna	Pending
