= Saint Luke's Lutheran Church =

Church in Manhattan, New York

- Saint Luke's Evangelical Lutheran Church
- U.S. National Register of Historic Places
- New York State Register of Historic Places
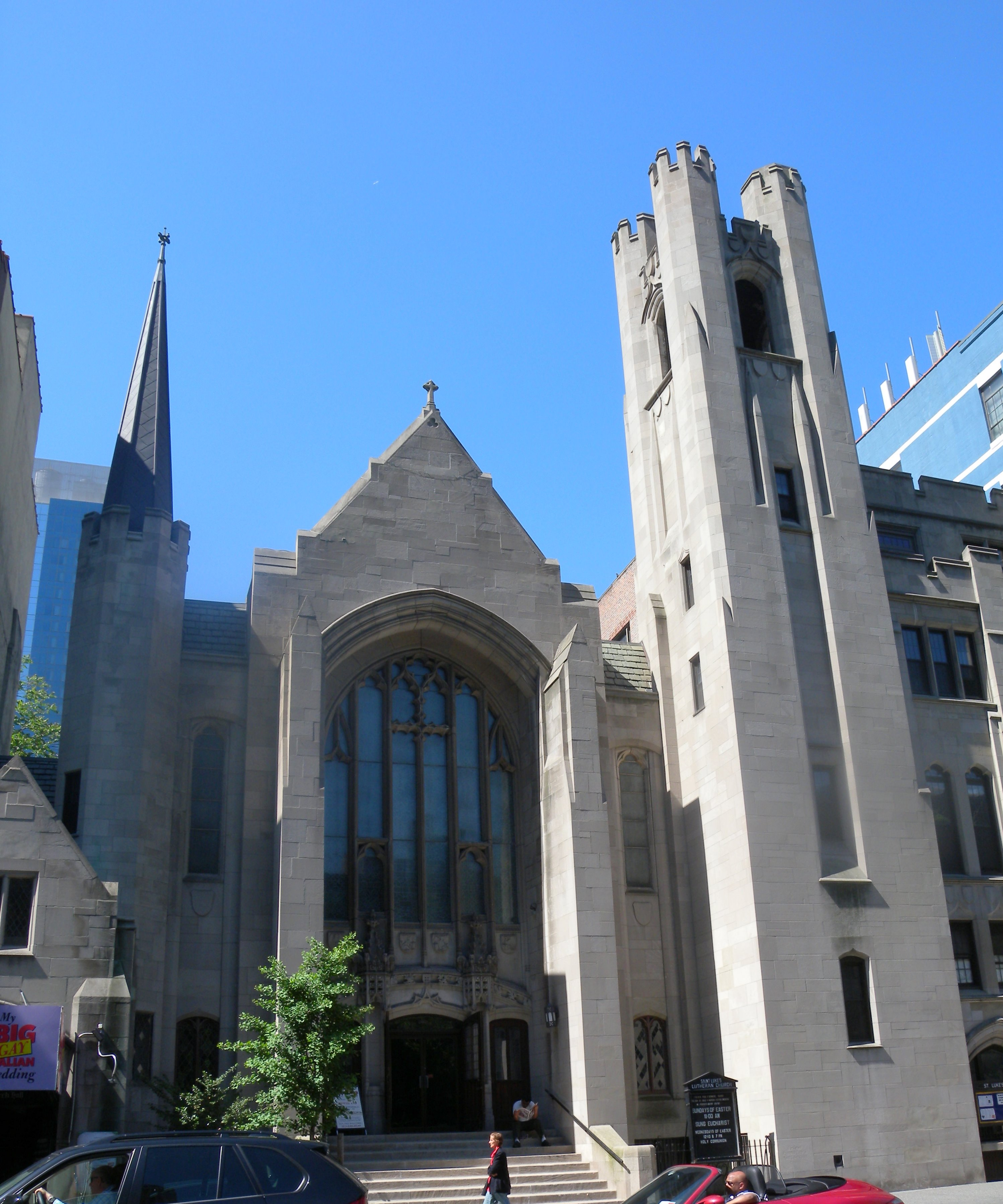
- (February 2011)

- Location within Manhattan Location within New York City Location within New York Location within the United States
- Location: 308 West 46th Street; Manhattan, New York City
- Coordinates: 40°45′35″N 73°59′19.5″W
- Built: 1922–23 (for church); 1922 (for parish house)
- Architect: Edward L. Tilton of Tilton & Githens; Francis Xavier Zettler (for 1923 facade); "Keally" of 141 East 45th Street (for 1922 parish house)
- Architectural style: Neo-Perpendicular with Art Moderne detailing (Late Gothic Revival)
- NRHP reference No.: 07000483
- NYSRHP No.: 06101.015286

Significant dates
- Added to NRHP: June 1, 2007
- Designated NYSRHP: April 9, 2007

Saint Luke's Lutheran Church, once known as The German Evangelical Lutheran Saint Luke's Church, is a historic Lutheran church located on Restaurant Row at 308 West 46th Street between Eighth and Ninth Avenues in the Theater District of Manhattan, New York City.

== History ==
St. Luke's was founded as a Dutch Reformed congregation in 1850, first meeting in rented rooms on the third floor of a building on 35th Street and 9th Avenue. It reorganized as a Lutheran congregation in 1853.

The church moved several times, acquiring its first owned building, a former Baptist church on 43rd Street, in 1863. It moved in 1875 to 233 West 42nd Street, into the former Forty-second Street Presbyterian Church. Finally, the congregation acquired property at West 46th Street to build its current church. The cornerstone was laid in October 1922 and the church dedicated in September 1923.

For many years, Dr. Donald Grey Barnhouse, pastor of Tenth Presbyterian Church in Philadelphia and teacher on the radio program, The Bible Study Hour (now known as Dr. Barnhouse & the Bible), held a Bible class on Monday evenings at the church, which lasted until his death in 1960.

Formerly an independent congregation without synodic affiliation since 1880, St. Luke's joined the Evangelical Lutheran Church in America in 1987.

St. Luke's Theatre and St. Luke's Soup Kitchen are located on the church's premises.

== Architecture ==
The church was built in 1922–23 to the designs of Edward L. Tilton of Tilton & Githens, with the facade of the nave featuring windows designed by Francis Xavier Zettler. The building was completed in 1923. The architecture has been described as a happy marriage between the Gothic Revival and Art Deco styles. A four-story parish house at 308–316 West 46th Street was built in 1922 to designs by architect Francis Keally of 141 East 45th Street at the cost of $150,000.

The church was added to the National Register of Historic Places in 2007.
