= The Healing Powers of Dude =

2020 American comedy streaming television series

- Genre: Comedy
- Created by: Erica Spates & Sam Littenberg-Weisberg
- Starring: Jace Chapman; Larisa Oleynik; Mauricio Lara; Sophie Kim; Laurel Emory; Tom Everett Scott
- Voices of: Steve Zahn
- Music by: Michael Kramer
- Country of origin: United States
- Original language: English
- No. of seasons: 1
- No. of episodes: 8

Production
- Executive producers: Erica Spates; Sam Littenberg-Weisberg; Dan Lubetkin; Richie Keen
- Producer: Chris Phillips
- Production location: Vancouver, British Columbia
- Cinematography: Jay Hunter
- Editors: Justin Li; Jamie Alain; Sabrina Pitre
- Camera setup: Single-camera
- Running time: 23–28 minutes
- Production companies: Meekel Meekel; Blue Ant Studios

Original release
- Network: Netflix
- Release: January 13, 2020

The Healing Powers of Dude is an American comedy television series created by Erica Spates and Sam Littenberg-Weisberg that premiered on Netflix on January 13, 2020.

== Premise ==
The Healing Powers of Dude follows Noah Ferris, "an 11-year-old boy with social anxiety disorder" who gets an emotional support dog to help him manage his disorder.

== Cast and characters ==
=== Main ===
- Jace Chapman as Noah Ferris, an 11-year-old boy who struggles with social anxiety disorder, who is going to a public school for the first time with his emotional support dog, named Dude, after previously being homeschooled
- Larisa Oleynik as Karen Ferris, Noah's mother, who works as a lawyer
- Mauricio Lara as Simon, Noah's extroverted friend with an alter ego he calls "Turbo"
- Sophie Kim as Amara, Noah's intelligent, physically disabled friend
- Laurel Emory as Embry Ferris, Noah's younger sister who has a knack for fashion
- Steve Zahn as the voice of Dude, Noah's emotional support dog
- Tom Everett Scott as Marvin Ferris, Noah and Embry's father and Karen's husband, who was an artist before he began homeschooling Noah and is starting to pursue art again

=== Recurring ===
- Peter Benson as Principal Myers, the principal of Roosevelt Middle School
- Raylene Harewood as Ms. Fleckberg, Noah, Simon, and Amara's English teacher at Roosevelt Middle School
- Gabrielle Quinn as Valerie, Noah's crush who shares his love of music
- Ethan Farrell as Dale, one of Noah and Simon's two twin bullies
- Vanessa Przada as Destiny, Noah and Simon's more aggressive bully
- Katy Colloton as the voice of Ms. Grumpy Pants, a neighbor's poodle

== Production ==
=== Development ===
On June 20, 2019, it was announced that Netflix had given the production a series order for a first season consisting of eight episodes. The Healing Powers of Dude was created by Erica Spates and Sam Littenberg-Weisberg who were also expected to executive produce alongside Richie Keen and Dan Lubetkin. The series was released on January 13, 2020.

=== Casting ===
Alongside the initial series announcement, it was reported that Tom Everett Scott, Larisa Oleynik, Laurel Emory, Mauricio Lara, Sophie Jaewon Kim, Dude the Dog, Jace Chapman had been cast in starring roles.

=== Filming ===
Principal photography for the first season began on June 14, 2019, and ended on August 13, 2019, in Vancouver, British Columbia.

== Episodes ==
No.	Title	Directed by	Written by	Original release date
1	"Second Step: Homeroom"	Richie Keen	Erica Spates & Sam Littenberg-Weisberg	January 13, 2020
2	"Getting to Know You"	Richie Keen	Erica Spates & Sam Littenberg-Weisberg	January 13, 2020
3	"Game On"	Yulin Kuang	Rick Singer	January 13, 2020
4	"Lord of the Bus"	Yulin Kuang	Angeli Millan	January 13, 2020
5	"Middle School Musical"	Steven Tsuchida	Joy Regullano	January 13, 2020
6	"Buried Treasure"	Richie Keen	Conor Hanney	January 13, 2020
7	"House Party of Horrors"	Richie Keen	Rick Singer	January 13, 2020
8	"I'll Be Right Here"	John Fortenberry	Erica Spates & Sam Littenberg-Weisberg	January 13, 2020

== Reception ==
In 2021, the series won two Daytime Emmy Awards for Outstanding Principal Performance in a Children's Program and Outstanding Casting for a Live-Action Children's Program.
