= Islander (musical) =

British musical (theatre production)

Islander is a musical conceived by Amy Draper with music and lyrics by Finn Anderson and a book by Stewart Melton. It follows the story of a young girl called Eilidh, who is the last child on a remote and increasingly depopulated Scottish island called Kinnan. It includes elements of Scottish folklore and has no band, instead using live looping technology to create music and sound cues. The musical features only two performers, who each play multiple roles.

== Premise ==
The “Bigland” has offered to resettle the residents of the island of Kinnan. The youngest resident, Eilidh, lives with her grandmother but spends most of her time alone. One day she finds a beached whale calf, and soon after meets a stranger named Arran, who claims to be from a floating island where the residents are shepherds of whales.

== Development ==
Draper first came up with the concept for Islander in 2014 or 2015, but it wasn't until 2017 that it became more fleshed out. The first workshop for the show was in 2017 on the Isle of Mull.

== Productions ==
Produced by Helen Milne Productions, the original production toured the Highlands and Islands of Scotland in 2018.

The musical was selected for the Made In Scotland showcase at the Edinburgh Festival Fringe in 2019, where it played in the Paines Plough Roundabout at Summerhall and was named Best Musical. In October 2019, the production transferred to London's Southwark Playhouse.

The Original Cast Recording was released on 25 September 2020.

In 2021 the show received productions in Poland and South Korea.

Islander opened Off-Broadway at Playhouse 46 at St Luke's in New York on April 21, 2022, and closed on June 13, 2022. The production featured the original cast of Bethany Tennick and Kirsty Findlay. The Off-Broadway production is produced by Helen Milne, Molly Morris, Martin Platt and James L Simon, and directed by Amy Draper.

The first production of Islander in Australia was in 2022, produced by Brisbane theatre company Passion Productions. The show ran from November 18 - 27 at the PIP Theatre, and was directed by Connor Clarke. Further creative were: Claire Argente as assistant director, Zara McCarthy as Movement Director, Donovan Wagner as Technical Manager and Sound Design, Fiona Black as Lighting Designer, Laurent Milton as Set and Art Designer, and Teddy Carter as Costume Designer.

The musical undertook its first US tour between 2024-2025, playing at Olney Theatre Center in Maryland, Chicago Shakespeare Theater, Seattle Repertory Theatre, and Herberger Theater Center in Phoenix.

== Adaptations ==
In 2021, a screen adaptation of the theatre show was produced by Dundee Repertory Theatre and Eden Court Theatre. The filmed adaptation was screened in Eden Court's cinema, before being available for streaming for a limited time through Dundee Repertory Theatre's streaming platform Rep Studios. A radio adaptation was also recorded for the BBC.
