= Claudio Quest =

American stage musical by Drew Fornarola and Marshall Pailet

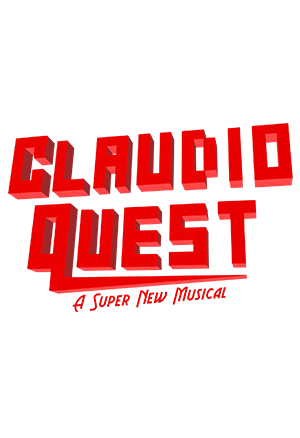
- Music: Drew Fornarola and Marshall Pailet
- Lyrics: Drew Fornarola and Marshall Pailet
- Book: Drew Fornarola and Marshall Pailet
- Productions: 2010 Capital Fringe Festival; 2015 New York Musical Theatre Festival
- Awards: New York Musical Theatre Festival; Award for Outstanding Direction; Honorable Mention for Outstanding Book, Outstanding Choreography

Claudio Quest is a musical with book, music and lyrics by Drew Fornarola and Marshall Pailet.

== Production history ==
Claudio Quest was originally conceived by Fornarola, who later contacted Pailet about co-writing the show together. The show, then titled Super Claudio Bros., premiered in 2010 in Washington, D.C. at the Capital Fringe Festival, where it was directed by Pailet.

It was part of the New York Music Theatre Festival (NYMF)'s 2015 season, where it make its New York premier in July 2015. The production was directed by John Tartaglia, who had participated in an earlier reading of the show and was then approached by Fornarola and Pailet about directing the piece. Choreography was by Shannon Lewis, and the show starred CJ Eldred, Ethan Slater, Andre Ward, Lesley McKinnell and Lindsey Brett Carothers. Claudio Quest opened to favorable reviews. The New York Times called it "a delightfully bouncy parody" and TheaterMania described it as "a winning new musical."

Claudio Quest extended its run at NYMF, playing five additional performances. It received six New York Musical Theatre Festival Awards, including Outstanding Direction for Tartaglia, Outstanding Featured Actor for Ward, Outstanding Individual Performance for both Slater and Carothers, and Outstanding Overall Design, the most of any NYMF production that year.

The show made its first amateur high-school debut in February 2023 in McLean High School, underneath director Philip Reid.

== Plot ==
Claudio Quest tells the story of Claudio and his younger brother Luis, two video game characters from the Eggplant Kingdom and their quest to rescue Princess Poinsettia from Bruiser, the evil platypus, with the help of Poinsettia's sister, Princess Fish.
