= Monsters at Work =

American animated television series

- Genre: Animated sitcom; Comedy; Fantasy
- Based on: Characters created by Pixar Animation Studios
- Developed by: Bobs Gannaway
- Showrunners: Bobs Gannaway; Kevin Deters
- Voices of: John Goodman; Billy Crystal; Ben Feldman; Mindy Kaling; Henry Winkler; Lucas Neff; Alanna Ubach
- Theme music composer: Randy Newman
- Composers: Dominic Lewis; Daniel Futcher
- Country of origin: United States
- Original language: English
- No. of seasons: 2
- No. of episodes: 20

Production
- Executive producers: Bobs Gannaway; Kevin Deters
- Producers: Sean Lurie; Ferrell Barron; Melissa Kurtz
- Editors: Dan Molina; Torien Lee
- Running time: 21–24 minutes
- Production company: Disney Television Animation (Note: Animation outsourced to ICON Creative Studio Inc.)

Original release
- Network: Disney+
- Release: July 7 – September 1, 2021
- Network: Disney Channel
- Release: April 5 – May 4, 2024

Monsters at Work is an American animated sitcom developed by Bobs Gannaway that premiered on Disney+ on July 7, 2021, as part of Pixar's Monsters, Inc. franchise. Based on and a direct continuation of Monsters, Inc., it features the voices of John Goodman and Billy Crystal reprising their roles as James P. "Sulley" Sullivan and Mike Wazowski from the original film and the 2013 prequel Monsters University; several other voice actors from the films reprise their roles as guests. Unlike other animated productions in the Monsters, Inc. franchise, Pixar did not produce the series. It was instead produced by Disney Television Animation and was the studio's second series to be based on a Pixar film after Buzz Lightyear of Star Command, on which Pixar served as a co-producer studio.

A second season premiered on Disney Channel on April 5, 2024. The first season of the series received mixed reviews from critics.

== Premise ==
Monsters at Work begins the day after Henry J. Waternoose III was arrested, with the Monsters, Incorporated factory making the transition to laugh power. Tylor Tuskmon, a recent Scare Major graduate from Monsters University, having previously received a letter of acceptance from Waternoose to be a scarer at the factory, is excited to work at the same company as his idol Sulley. However, Tylor is devastated to learn that the company is no longer in need of scarers, and he is reassigned to work as a mechanic on the Monsters Inc. Facilities Team (MIFT). Meanwhile, Sulley and Mike encounter the trials and tribulations of running the company.

In season two, Tylor's position and friendships at Monsters, Incorporated are put at risk when he receives a job offer to work at business rival Fear Co.

== Cast and characters ==
=== Main ===
- John Goodman as James P. "Sulley" Sullivan: The CEO of Monsters, Incorporated, Mike's best friend, and Tylor's mentor. The season 2 and series finale "Powerless" reveals his middle name to be Patrick.
- Billy Crystal as Mike Wazowski: The self-appointed Senior Co-President of Monsters, Incorporated, Chief Executive Vice-Deputy Administrative Director of Comedy Resources Management, and Sulley's best friend. He is also a top jokester and was Tylor's teacher in comedy during season 1.
- Ben Feldman as Tylor Tuskmon: A scare graduate from Monsters University who was reassigned to the Monsters, Incorporated Facilities Team (MIFT). During season 1 he took part-time classes to be a jokester.
- Mindy Kaling as Val Little: Tylor's acquaintance from Monsters University who shared a class with him during their freshman year before she dropped out. She is an enthusiastic mechanic. As season 1 progresses, she and Tylor become best friends.
- Henry Winkler as Fritz: The friendly and scatterbrained tapir-nosed boss of MIFT.
- Lucas Neff as:
  - Duncan P. Anderson: A self-centered winged monster at MIFT who is obsessed with getting Fritz's job, and has a one-sided rivalry with Tylor.
  - A human father in "The Damaged Room"
  - Richard, a small winged monster in "Little Monsters".
- Alanna Ubach as:
  - Katherine "Cutter" Sterns: A crab-like worker at MIFT.
  - Ubach also voices several minor characters, such as Carla "Killer Claws" Benitez, "Roaring" Rosie Levin, a human mother in "The Damaged Room", and the narrator of the orientation film in "Welcome to Monsters, Incorporated".

=== Recurring ===
- Bonnie Hunt as Ms. Flint: A winged monster who runs the simulation room at Monsters, Incorporated. Hunt reprises her role from the film.
- Curtis Armstrong as Mr. Crummyham: The gecko-like supervisor at Monsters, Incorporated.
- Jennifer Tilly (season 1), and Roxana Ortega (season 2) as Celia Mae: Mike's snake-haired girlfriend who has been promoted from Monsters Incorporated receptionist to Laugh Floor supervisor. Tilly reprised her role from the film for season 1, while Ortega took over the role for season 2 after having previously voiced the character in the video game Disney Speedstorm (2023).
- Bob Peterson as:
  - Roz: The slug-like leader of the Child Detection Agency who previously was undercover as a secretary at Monsters, Incorporated.
  - Bob "Dentures" Peterson: A dinosaur-like monster who shares Peterson's name and has removable teeth. He was originally voiced by Jack Angel in the film.
  - Roze, Roz's twin sister who takes over Roz's old job.
- Stephen Stanton as:
  - Needleman and Smitty: Two workers of Monsters, Incorporated who operate the Door Shredder. They were originally voiced by Dan Gerson in the film.
  - George Sanderson: A scarer who was the victim of the code "23-19". He was originally voiced by Sam Black in the film.
- Christopher Swindle as:
  - Jeff Fungus: The former scare assistant of Randall Boggs who is now Mike's laugh assistant. He was originally voiced by Frank Oz in the film.
  - Thaddeus "Phlegm" Bile: A trainee scarer. He was originally voiced by Jeff Pidgeon in the film.
  - Theodore "Ted" Pauley: A monster with 16 removable eyes. He was originally voiced by Katherine Ringgold in the film.
  - Chuck: The assistant of Pete "Claws" Ward. He was originally voiced by Danny Mann in the film.
- Aisha Tyler as Millie: Tylor's mother.
- John Ratzenberger as:
  - Bernard: Tylor's father.
  - The Abominable Snowman: A former Monsters, Inc. mailroom worker who Sully brought out of exile. It is revealed that he was banished by Waternoose for stumbling upon a letter detailing his and Randall's scream extractor plot. Ratzenberger reprises his role from the original film.
- Jenifer Lewis as Virginia Tuskmon: Tylor's grandmother who moves in with Tylor and his parents in season 2.
- Joe Lo Truglio and Ali Wong as Jack and Jill: two TV journalists who share a centipede-like body. They appear in season 2.
- Rhys Darby as Roger Rogers: a monster who joins MIFT in season 2. In "Lights! Camera! Chaos!", it is revealed that he is actually Henry J. Waternoose IV, the son of convicted former CEO Henry J. Waternoose III. In "Descent into Fear", it is revealed that Roger was his childhood nickname.
- Nathan Fillion as Johnny Worthington III: The CEO of Fear Co. and Claire's husband who appears in season 2, reprising his role from Monsters University
- Aubrey Plaza as Claire Wheeler-Worthington: The Senior Vice-President of Marketing of Fear Co. and Johnny's wife who appears in season 2, reprising her role from Monsters University
- Bobby Moynihan as Chet Alexander: Johnny's assistant who appears in season 2, reprising his role from Monsters University
- Janelle James as Joy: The top scarer at Fear Co. who appears in season 2
- Richard Ayoade as Declan: A scare floor supervisor at Fear Co. who resembles Duncan and appears in season 2.
- Paula Pell as Sunny: Cutter's girlfriend who works at Monsters, Incorporated at the receiving station and appears in season 2.

Other cast members include Bobs Gannaway as Otis, the new Monsters, Incorporated receptionist, and Roto, Duncan's pet, Gabriel Iglesias as Gary Gibbs, Mike Wazowski's arch-nemesis who appears in "The Big Wazowskis" and "Bad Hair Day", and Dee Bradley Baker as Winchester: the non-verbal member of the Monsters, Incorporated Facilities Team, nicknamed "Banana Bread".

Alfred Molina reprises his role as Professor Derek Knight from Monsters University (2013) in "Welcome to Monsters, Incorporated" and the season 2 episode "A Monstrous Homecoming". John Michael Higgins guest stars as Argus Blinks in "The Cover Up". Bob Uecker guest stars in "The Damaged Room" as a monster parody of himself named Bob Yucker. Gannaway's daughter Hadley guest stars in "Little Monsters" as Ms. Flint's daughter Thalia. In addition, Devin Bright, Cooper Friedman, Lucian Perez, and Isabella Abiera voice monster children in "Little Monsters".

Additional monster voices include Carlos Alazraqui, Ferrell Barron, Hiromi Dames, Michaela Dietz, and Dave Wittenberg.

Season 2 features Jennifer Coolidge, Bowen Yang, Danny Pudi, Cody Rigsby, Jimmy Tatro, Danny Trejo, and Alan Tudyk as guest stars. Julia Butters voices Lorelei Worthington, Johnny and Claire's daughter. Kurtwood Smith voices Alistair Clawbottom.

Steve Buscemi reprises his role as Randall Boggs in the season 2 episodes "Descent Into Fear" and "Powerless".

== Episodes ==
=== Series overview ===
Season	Episodes	Originally released		
Season	Episodes	First released	Last released	Network
1	10	July 7, 2021	September 1, 2021	Disney+
2	10	April 5, 2024	May 4, 2024	Disney Channel

=== Season 1 (2021) ===
No. overall	No. in season	Title	Directed by	Written by	Original release date
1	1	"Welcome to Monsters, Incorporated"	Kaitlyn Ritter	Bobs Gannaway	July 7, 2021
Monsters University scare graduate Tylor Tuskmon receives a letter of acceptance from Henry J. Waternoose III to be a scarer at Monsters, Incorporated. However, Tylor arrives at the factory the day after Waternoose's arrest by the Child Detection Agency for his plot to kidnap human children. (Note: As depicted in Monsters, Inc. (2001).) The Board of Directors put Sulley and Mike in charge of the factory and give Roz's old position to her twin sister Roze. Under Sulley and Mike's new management, the company is revamped and needs jokesters instead of scarers. Having studied for a discontinued job, Tylor is transferred to MIFT (Monsters, Incorporated Facilities Team) as a maintenance worker (as his interviewer Mr. Crummyham learns that Tylor's parents own a hardware store), a position he dislikes and is eager to leave. He runs away from his new co-workers, bluffs his way onto the Laugh Floor and attempts to make a child laugh. Because of his lack of experience, his attempt backfires and results in a major accident that leads to the door being shredded. Nevertheless, Sulley believes in him and Tylor reluctantly accepts his position in the facilities crew while Mike decides to teach a comedy class to show scarers how to be funny.
2	2	"Meet MIFT"	Shane Zalvin	Bart Jennett	July 7, 2021
MIFT puts Tylor through an initiation ceremony, but his lack of enthusiasm and skill make his future with them seem uncertain. Meanwhile, Mike has been working long hours as both a jokester and a comedy teacher, and the energy crisis begins affecting Monsters, Incorporated. While Mike is making a child laugh, an outage makes the door deactivate, trapping Mike in the human world. However, Mike is saved after Tylor helps the MIFT crew repair the door station. While celebrating Tylor's first successful repair job, the members of MIFT learn Winchester's actual name (having previously nicknamed him "Banana Bread" as he always brought that for lunch and never spoke) when he resigns to be a jokester after impressing Ms. Flint. Mike's Comedy Class: Mike sings a song concerning the possible dangers of comedy.
3	3	"The Damaged Room"	Shane Zalvin	Bobs Gannaway and Evan Gore & Heather Lombard; Based on a Premise by: Travis Braun	July 14, 2021
Phlegm damages a wall in a baby girl's bedroom, forcing MIFT to enter and quickly fix it. The child needs to be removed during the repair, so Mike decides to look after her and ends up naming her Snore, due to her snoring. Sulley reveals he got tickets to a baseball game and Mike takes Snore with them to see it. Val tries to remind Tylor of their time together at Monsters University, but he does not recall spending time with her. They manage to fix the wall, but get trapped when the door is accidentally deactivated. Val admits to Tylor that her time at Monsters University was special to her because he was the only one who spoke to her. Cutter gets them out of the room and Mike brings Snore back and sings her a lullaby to put her back to sleep. As they leave, Tylor gains a greater appreciation for Val and reveals that he recalls speaking to her at Monsters University. Mike's Comedy Class: Mike teaches his class how to use a whoopee cushion and accidentally sets it off.
4	4	"The Big Wazowskis"	Kaitlyn Ritter	Bobs Gannaway	July 21, 2021
At Monsters, Inc.'s annual bowling tournament, Mike gets into a heated bet against his charismatic rival/doppelgänger Gary. Taking the opportunity to impress Mike, Tylor offers to assemble MIFT into a bowling team to compete on Mike's behalf. During practice, Tylor is dismayed when he realizes that he is the only one who can play well. Competing as "The Big Wazowskis", MIFT fumble their way to the top of the tournament through a series of accidents. Seeing another opportunity to rid himself of Tylor, Duncan tricks him into misleading MIFT into thinking the match has been canceled in exchange for a more skilled team. On the day of the match, MIFT confronts Tylor over his lie and Duncan's team abandons Tylor for his selfishness. To Duncan's dismay, the rest of MIFT still compete through Tylor turning their lack of skill into brilliant plays. However, the match ends up being a tie, forcing Mike and Gary to share the grand prize of a dinner for two at Harryhausen's, much to Mike's annoyance. Mike's Comedy Class: Mike attempts to teach the class about how to deal with hecklers, only to be constantly heckled by Gary. Note: This episode is dedicated to story artist, Robert Gibbs (father of Mary Gibbs, who voiced Boo in Monsters, Inc.) who died in 2020.
5	5	"The Cover Up"	Shane Zalvin	Ricky Roxburgh and Bobs Gannaway	July 28, 2021
When Fritz takes a vacation to the human world, he spins a wheel to decide who will be temporary supervisor in his absence. The wheel lands on Val, but Duncan guilts Val into allowing him to be temporary supervisor. Duncan abuses the position with outrageous demands, particularly of Tylor. When Tylor engages in a prank to get even, however, Duncan retaliates and the pair accidentally cause a citywide blackout. MIFT reluctantly agrees to cover up the incident, but things get tense when an inspector from the Monstropolis Energy Regulatory Commission arrives and discovers the truth. When he confronts the team and threatens Duncan with banishment, he is accidentally knocked unconscious by a canister and Duncan and Tylor throw him through Fritz's vacation door. Two weeks later, Fritz and the inspector emerge and the inspector, having enjoyed his impromptu vacation, decides to let everyone off with a warning. As it all happened on Duncan's watch, Mike and Sulley confront him over his fireable offenses, but are convinced by Fritz to let it slide when both Tylor and Duncan take responsibility for the accident. Mike's Comedy Class: Mike tries to explain the concept of knock-knock jokes but two monsters fail to understand and Mike, visibly stressed, is carried out on a stretcher.
6	6	"The Vending Machine"	Kaitlyn Ritter	Michelle Spitz and Bobs Gannaway	August 4, 2021
Tylor accidentally damages Vendy, the MIFT vending machine. At the same time, profits and morale are down at the company and Fritz is asked to fire one of the members of the team due to budget cuts, leaving Tylor worried about being fired due to his lack of repair skill. When Mike hears of the situation, he decides to improve company morale by making several outlandish and expensive upgrades to the facility, starting with a brand new vending machine for MIFT. However, an argument between Duncan and Tylor leads to the new machine being damaged and Duncan's attempts to repair it causes it to severely malfunction. When the machine attacks Duncan, Tylor destroys it to save him. A stressed Fritz announces that, rather than firing one of his team, he will retire. Though it turns out that Mike's ideas to boost morale have worked, increasing productivity and profits and Fritz stays on. The next day, Tylor surprises the team by revealing that he has repaired the original Vendy. Mike's Comedy Class: Mike instructs the class to dress-up as clowns. However, one monster comes across as scarier in clown makeup.
7	7	"Adorable Returns"	Shane Zalvin	Bobs Gannaway and Ethan Sandler	August 11, 2021
Tylor gets a chance to become an official jokester when Mike summons his comedy class to the Laugh Floor to help generate power during a heatwave. However, Tylor must first help fix the door rails. In his haste, he accidentally gets thrown through a banishment door to the Himalayas, where he meets Mike and Sulley's old friend Adorable. Val brings Tylor back, but they accidentally bring Adorable along, whom everyone fears due to rumors over his banishment. Val decides to find out why Adorable was banished while Tylor opens up to him about his dream of being a jokester. After convincing him to go back through the door, Val informs Tylor that Adorable was banished after he discovered a letter from Waternoose regarding plans for his scream extractor. Tylor gives up his chance to be a jokester so that he can bring Adorable back to Monstropolis, where Mike and Sulley formally un-banish him and make him the official Monsters, Inc. snow cone vendor. Mike's Comedy Class: Mike tries to explain the use of a sting for punch lines, but gets repeatedly interrupted by his assistant, who then stalls when Mike is hit with a literal punch line via boxing glove.
8	8	"Little Monsters"	Shane Zalvin	Ricky Roxburgh and Bobs Gannaway	August 18, 2021
After several failed jokester auditions, Ms. Flint tells Tylor that he is not funny and will not be offered any more auditions. However, Tylor sees an opportunity to redeem himself during Monsters, Incorporated's annual 'Mini Monsters Day' when he attempts to impress Ms. Flint's daughter Thalia with his jokes. He briefly gets along with her when MIFT rescues a baby monster from the door shafts. Though she later tells him that he is not funny. While complaining to Val about Ms. Flint, Thalia overhears and says that she will go tell her mother. While chasing after Thalia, Tylor crashes into a coffee cart and inadvertently ends up making others laugh. He admits to Thalia that he wanted to make her laugh in the hope of becoming a jokester. His honesty earns him her respect and she tells MIFT that she enjoyed her day with them and that they are the unsung heroes of Monsters, Incorporated, including Tylor. Later, she tells her mother that she found Tylor funny. Mike's Comedy Class: With the help of Sulley, Mike explains the concept of a comedy duo, and considers himself to be the straight man while demonstrating why he is actually the goofball of the pair.
9	9	"Bad Hair Day"	Kaitlyn Ritter	Michelle Spitz and Bobs Gannaway	August 25, 2021
Due to his previous failed auditions, Tylor believes that he will never become a jokester and decides to instead focus on being a perfect MIFT member. The other MIFT members are celebrating the anniversary of former employee David who was sucked into a shredder shaft and killed, aside from a lock of hair that they keep in a jar to honor him. To prove himself, Tylor offers to do tasks for the other MIFT members while they are out of the office. However, things go wrong when Duncan's pet Roto eats David's hair. Tylor eventually goes to the shredder shaft to find more of David's hair, and accidentally turns the shredder on. He manages to stop the shredder, but gets knocked out and dreams that he meets David. When he awakens, Tylor returns to the office and ends up admitting what happened. The others commend Tylor for his honesty and assure him that he is a good MIFT member, and it is revealed that they have a bag of David's hair to replace it. Mike's Comedy Class: Mike explains improvisation and asks for suggestions. However, he can only imitate round objects.
10	10	"It's Laughter They're After"	Kaitlyn Ritter	Bart Jennett and Bobs Gannaway	September 1, 2021
Mike and Sulley are told by Roz that the Monstropolis Energy Regulatory Commission had found that Monsters, Incorporated is not generating enough power. Unless the factory can generate one million gigglewatts in one day, laugh power will be considered unreliable and the factory will be shut down, with power needs transferring to their business rival Fear Co. (which has retained the scaring method, much to Sulley's disgust). Since laughs provide ten times more power than screams, Tylor reasons that they need to make larger canisters. While Cutter works on a prototype, Tylor is summoned to Ms. Flint's office where she tells him that his humor comes from physical comedy. Mike then makes Tylor a jokester-in-training to help the factory generate enough power. As he begins on the Laugh Floor, MIFT arrives to cheer him on. The power deadline is almost not met, until Cutter brings in the larger prototype canister and attaches it to Mike's door. After Monsters, Incorporated is saved from shutting down, Tylor is transferred to the Laugh Floor as an official jokester. As he begins his first day with Val as his assistant, the Laugh Floor epilogue from Monsters, Inc. is seen.

=== Season 2 (2024) ===
No. overall	No. in season	Title	Directed by	Written by	Original release date	Prod. code	U.S. viewers (millions)
11	1	"A Monstrous Homecoming"	Kay Hayes	Colleen Evanson	April 5, 2024	201	0.11
As the citizens of Monstropolis struggle to accept the newly discovered laugh power, Tylor's new job as a jokester ends up hitting a snag when he is unable to fill a single laugh canister in one day due to most children growing weary of his comedy routine of throwing doughnuts onto his horns. Soon, he goes to a homecoming celebration at Monsters University during a football game with Val and the rest of MIFT attending for moral support. Tylor ends up embarrassing himself by trying to explain to the crowd that he is now a jokester. After getting words of encouragement from fellow M.U. alumnus and the head of Fear Co., Johnny Worthington III, Tylor attempts to fill his canister late at night, but accidentally makes a kid scream, causing the canister to mix with laugh and scream power.
12	2	"The C.R.E.E.P. Show"	Kay Hayes	Hilary Helding	April 5, 2024	202	0.12
Tylor and Val visit their MIFT friends to find that they have a new employee named Roger Rogers. Mike, Sulley, Tylor, Val, Fritz, Cutter, Duncan, Smitty, and Needleman then attend the Convention for Reliable Energy, Efficiency and Power (C.R.E.E.P.) on behalf of Monsters, Inc. However, the company has been demoted to a half-size booth near the restroom in the convention's alternative energy section for switching to laugh power. As Tylor walks around the convention floor lamenting his struggles as a jokester, he gets mocked by a trio of monsters for his embarrassing speech at the football game, causing him to angrily prove his scariness in Fear Co.'s scare simulator, breaking it with his powerful roar. As Mike and Sulley hold a presentation proving that laugh power is more powerful than scream power, Tylor discovers that his canister's laugh and scream power mixture is volatile and is about to explode. Just after Mike and Sulley successfully prove laugh power's efficiency, Tylor takes away the canister and brings it to the restroom, allowing it to explode safely away from others in a stall. At the end of the convention, Johnny, impressed by Tylor's scaring ability from earlier, hands his Fear Co. business card to Tylor, telling him to stay in touch.
13	3	"Setting the Table"	Shane Zalvin	John Kazlauskas	April 13, 2024	203	0.14
Tylor plans to meet Johnny for dinner at a restaurant after work, though he discovers that MIFT, Mike, Sulley and a few Monsters, Inc employees have come to the same restaurant to commemorate Fritz when he decides to make a big announcement. Tylor goes back and forth to be both at Fritz's party in a back room and at Johnny's table. In the midst of all this, Johnny reveals that he wants to hire Tylor as a scarer at Fear Co., much to Tylor's shock. Fritz reveals that his big announcement is that he is cutting back on his favorite soft drink, much to Duncan's disappointment as he thought Fritz was going to retire. Johnny ends up finding out that Mike and Sulley are at the restaurant, and he apologizes to them for a television interview from that morning which made laugh power look bad. After everyone else leaves the restaurant, Tylor and Val stay behind and Tylor reveals to Val about Johnny's offer, and he finds that Johnny has left behind a scare card of his father Jack on the seat.
14	4	"Opening Doors"	Shane Zalvin	Deepak Sethi	April 13, 2024	204	0.20
Tylor plans to visit Fear Co. during lunch to return Johnny's scare card of his father and decline his job offer. However, Johnny takes him on an impromptu tour of Fear Co. and Tylor finds himself impressed with the factory. He soon meets a drop-out jokester-turned-scarer Rosie who tells Tylor she took the Fear Co. job because she felt that she was meant to be a scarer. Tylor ultimately declines Johnny's job offer. Johnny respects the decision and Tylor leaves when he finds out he stayed way past lunchtime. During Tylor's absence, Val has to cover for him in order to avoid rousing suspicion and manages to fill a canister can of laughs by befriending a human child. This gets Mike's attention and offers her a position as jokester, to her surprise. Meanwhile, the rest of MIFT are visited by a canister inspector named Sunny, who accuses Cutter of causing the canisters to leak, so the MIFT crew alongside Smitty and Needleman spend the day trying to find the source, but cannot find any leaks. Later that night, Duncan finds Tylor's discarded coffee cup with the Fear Co. logo on it.
15	5	"It's Coming From Inside the House"	Kay Hayes	Joy Regullano	April 20, 2024	205	0.14
Mike and Sulley witness Val make the robotic child in the simulator room laugh. Val soon leaves and goes to Tylor's home, where his family is having a stoop sale and he is reluctant to part with his prized possessions, so Val tries to help him get rid of them. The other members of MIFT come to the sale as customers (though Duncan is investigating on whether or not Tylor is responsible for the canister leaks and in the process, cozies up to Tylor's grandmother for information). Tylor is soon persuaded to part with his scare card collection when he learns from an argument between his father and grandmother that their family is struggling financially. That night, Tylor's grandmother reveals that she was once a scarer but had to retire to raise Tylor's father. Tylor begins second-guessing his decision to turn down Johnny's offer. Duncan's investigation ends up short, despite gathering some circumstantial information.
16	6	"Field of Screams"	Shane Zalvin	Ethan Sandler	April 20, 2024	206	0.14
Monsters, Inc. and Fear Co. compete against each other at a softball game. During all of this, Tylor's anxiety about everything that has been happening causes him to reconsider turning down Johnny's offer. Mike and Sulley offer Val a job as a jokester and she struggles to tell Tylor about it. Tylor soon learns from Johnny that the latter gave the scarer position to another monster named Skylar, much to his frustration. Eventually, Val tells Tylor about the job offer, to his shock. Soon, Tylor accidentally knocks out Skylar and Johnny asks him to pitch for Fear Co. in his stead and Val becomes the hitter which soon results in him making his final throw for her to hit, but he catches the ball, costing Monsters, Inc. the game. As the monsters board the bus back to the company, Tylor finds his friendship with Val strained.
17	7	"Monsters in the Dark"	Kay Hayes	Hilary Helding	April 27, 2024	207	0.14
Mike and Sulley call in Tylor, MIFT and some of the other employees into a deep basement for a meeting in hopes to boost morale after their softball game loss, with Tylor and Val's friendship still strained. After Fritz tells the story of a monster called Karlov "The Shrieker" who despises laughter, Mike and Sulley go missing, and Tylor, Val, and Roger go to search for them, while Tylor and Val unleash their frustrations with each other. Meanwhile, the other employees hatch a plan to use an old banishment door powered up by an outdated generator. When Val fails to release the door due to the lever getting stuck, Tylor is forced to improvise and pull the door down when "The Shrieker" arrives. However, "The Shrieker" is revealed to be a disguised Mike and Sulley, who put on the whole act in order to get everyone to work together, and Val tells Tylor that she will take Mike and Sulley's jokester job offer.
18	8	"Lights! Camera! Chaos!"	Shane Zalvin	Deepak Sethi	April 27, 2024	208	0.16
News anchors Jack and Jill visit Monsters, Inc., with Mike and Sulley hoping to boost laugh power's popularity. As Tylor and MIFT celebrate Val’s ascension to jokester, Celia calls them to clean up the vandalized Laugh Floor before Jack and Jill see it. However, Tylor and Val notice that Roger is acting suspicious and they soon read up on his file in Fritz's office. Mike and Sulley become aware of the damage and try to stall Jack and Jill before they see the Laugh Floor. When MIFT is unable to remove the graffiti, they attempt to hide it just as Jack and Jill arrive. However, Mike accidentally exposes the vandalism and Tylor arrives to reveal that Roger is actually Waternoose's namesake son. In Mike and Sulley's office, they explain that they were aware of Roger's familial connection. Some missing items are found in Tylor's locker and Duncan accuses Tylor of sabotage, causing Tylor to reveal Johnny's job offer, but Val is hesitant to defend him due to his lack of support. Feeling betrayed, Tylor resigns from Monsters, Inc. while Val gets assigned to be an official jokester. At Fear Co., Johnny gets a call from Tylor.
19	9	"Descent Into Fear"	Kay Hayes	Joy Regullano	May 4, 2024	209	0.12
Tylor and Val begin their first days as a scarer at Fear Co. and a jokester at Monsters, Inc. respectively. Tylor finds that Fear Co.'s top scarer Joy is fiercely competitive. Soon Tylor is tasked with scaring Ben, a kid he used to make laugh, but after scaring him to tears, Tylor begins rethinking his stance on being a scarer. At Monsters, Inc., there is a shortage of laugh power, forcing the jokesters to work overtime in order to provide power to the city. At a Fear Co. press conference, Johnny announces that the company is creating a machine that amplifies scream energy just as a blackout happens. He then brings Tylor to a secret room where he reveals that he has been stealing laugh energy from Monsters, Inc. with help from Randall Boggs.
20	10	"Powerless"	Shane Zalvin	Colleen Evanson & Frank Contreras	May 4, 2024	210	0.15
Randall explains that Johnny brought him back to Monstropolis, and he has been stealing Monsters, Inc.'s laugh energy and framing Tylor for mishaps at Monsters, Inc. Tylor learns that Johnny is mixing laugh and scream power, which he knows will cause the building to explode. Desperate to stop Johnny when he plans to unveil the "Scream Amplifier" later that night, Tylor goes to MIFT just as Monsters, Inc. is being shut down by the Monstropolis Energy Regulatory Commission (M.E.R.C.). MIFT agrees to help Tylor by remaking Waternoose's old scream extractor to separate the scream power. At Fear Co.'s receiving station, Tylor and Val try to distract Johnny from activating the machine. Randall tries to stop MIFT, and the scream extractor's plug is broken in their fight. Chet, who is revealed to be a M.E.R.C. spy, uses Randall's tail as a substitute plug, saving Monstropolis. Tylor and Val expose Randall and Johnny's actions on live TV, leading to their arrest, though Randall later escapes. To prove laugh power's merits, Tylor and Val bring the news crew to Ben's door. With Val at his side, they manage to make Ben laugh in front of Monstropolis with Tylor reconciling with Ben. Tylor returns to Monsters, Inc. where he and Val become a comedy duo.

== Production ==
=== Development ===
During the Walt Disney Company's earnings call in November 2017, CEO Bob Iger announced that a new series set in the universe of Monsters, Inc., was in development for their planned streaming service Disney+. The series is produced by Disney Television Animation. Longtime Disney Television producer Bobs Gannaway served as showrunner for the first season. He was asked to work on the series after development began, due to his experience on both TV animation and films, having directed the spin-off of Pixar's Cars franchise; Planes: Fire & Rescue.

During the 2019 D23 Expo, Gannaway and producer Ferrell Barron revealed that employees from Walt Disney Animation Studios and Pixar were also involved in the production, to create a series that Barron described as "unique and special". Monsters, Inc. filmmakers, including director and Pixar's chief creative officer Pete Docter, provided the team with both used and unused concept art from the film, with the unused concept art being recycled for the series. Gannaway stated that the creative leaders at Pixar were, "very supportive of the show" and additionally stated, "they were also very much like 'Go out and create new characters and have fun.' So, it wasn't by any means any kind of policing situation. It was go have fun in the world with your new characters."

In February 2020, Stephen Anderson revealed that he would serve as one of the directors on the series. Anderson joined the series eight months before Disney Television Animation was temporarily closed due to the COVID-19 pandemic, after being approached personally by Gannaway; he ultimately did not direct any of the episodes. In early 2021, Billy Crystal revealed that production had slightly slowed down due to the COVID-19 pandemic, but that it should be released later that year.

In September 2021, cast member Henry Winkler indicated that a second season was in development. The second season was officially announced at Annecy International Animation Film Festival 2022, with Kevin Deters and Stevie Wermers (the Prep & Landing shorts, Olaf's Frozen Adventure) replacing Gannaway and Anderson as showrunner and supervising director, respectively.

=== Writing ===
According to Anderson, Pixar assisted the producers on the series by providing notes during its writing and early storyboarding process in order to "keep [them] on track as far as the legacy of the project". He also said that the series would differ from the films by further exploring "different areas of Monsters, Inc.", and that the series would further explore the transition in the company from screams to laughs seen at the end of the first film. Anderson also said that the series would feature an overarching story, but certain episodes would focus more on character development than the overall arc.

The series expands the role of the female characters in the original film, with receptionist Celia Mae being promoted to Laugh Floor supervisor in order to "move a female character up into a leadership role", as well as featuring trainer Ms. Flint's reaction to the transition from scares to laughter. The series also features a new character named Roze, who is Roz's twin sister, as the producers felt that, due to the latter being revealed as the head of the "Child Detection Agency" at the end of the first film, "she wouldn't be back outside the laugh floor". In addition, Bob Peterson, story supervisor on Monsters, Inc., serves as a creative consultant for the first season.

According to Gannaway, it took the producers almost a year to conceive the series' premise. He also compared Tylor's struggles with the transition with the current world status due to the COVID-19 pandemic, feeling that both the character and the audiences had "the universe [throw them] a curveball", which he felt made Tylor a more relatable character by having flaws the audience could connect with. Gannaway also said he wanted the series to have "the sort of feel of a Pixar story" by making the audience care about Tylor and his personal journey.

Gannaway was originally not going to include the characters of Smitty and Needleman out of respect for their voice actor, Dan Gerson, who died in 2016. However, he eventually incorporated them into the series when he felt Gerson would want the characters to continue. Gannaway paid an homage to Gerson by including a "Gerson Industries" logo in the trash cans the duo push.

In order to get a sense of what it was like working in a factory, the production team visited two power plants and interviewed the workers about their day. Gannaway stated, "You want to tether everything to truth. You can't make a movie about a power plant if you haven't walked one; otherwise you're just making stuff up."

The second season focuses on workplace existentialism and features the rival company Fear Co. The company was in earlier versions of Monsters, Inc. before being cut. Stevie Wermers-Skelton wanted Monsters, Inc. to represent the "utilitarian blue-collar" type workplace that preaches togetherness while Fear Co. is "basically Google" in that beyond its shiny facade, it has brutal inner workings.

=== Casting and recording ===
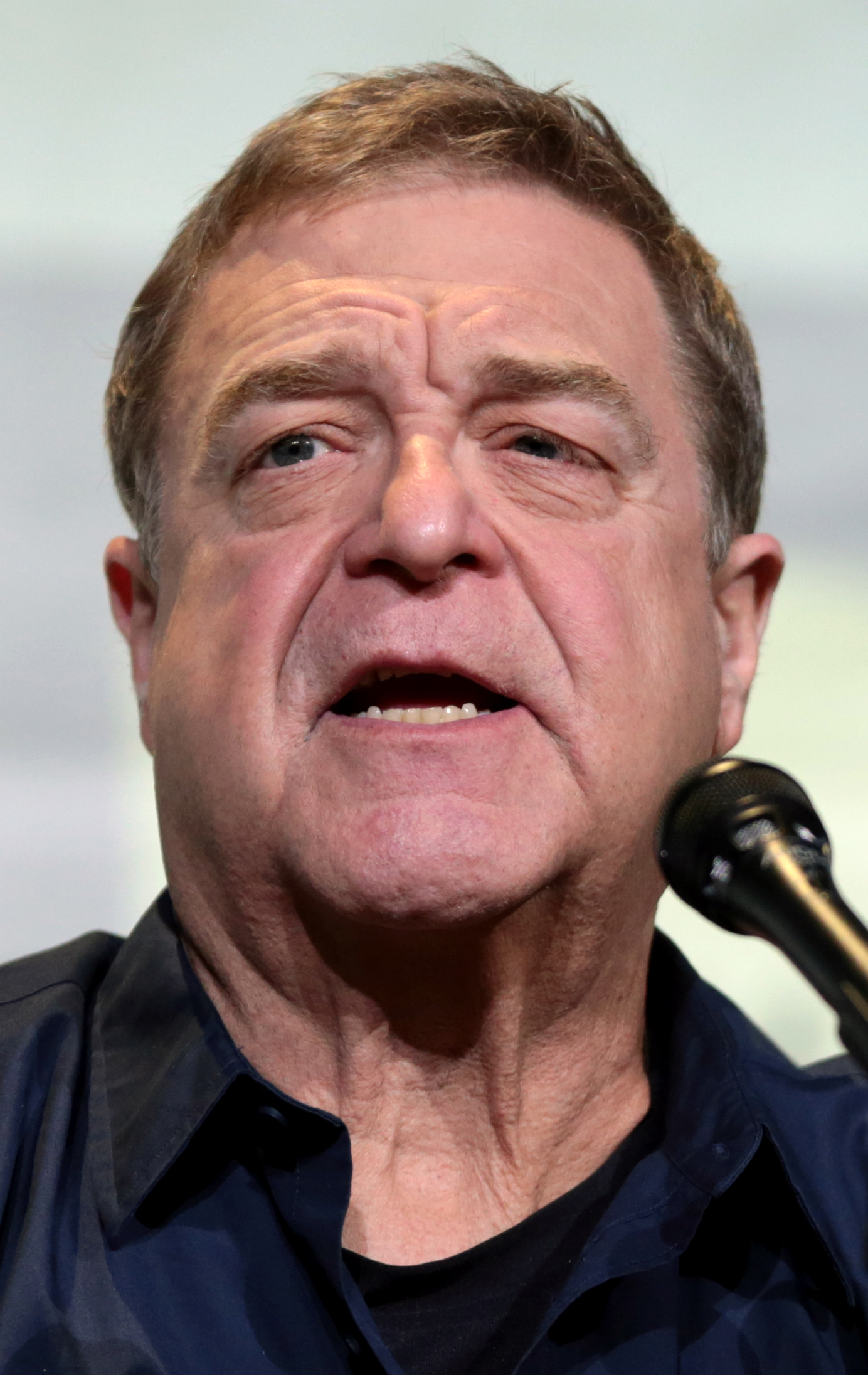
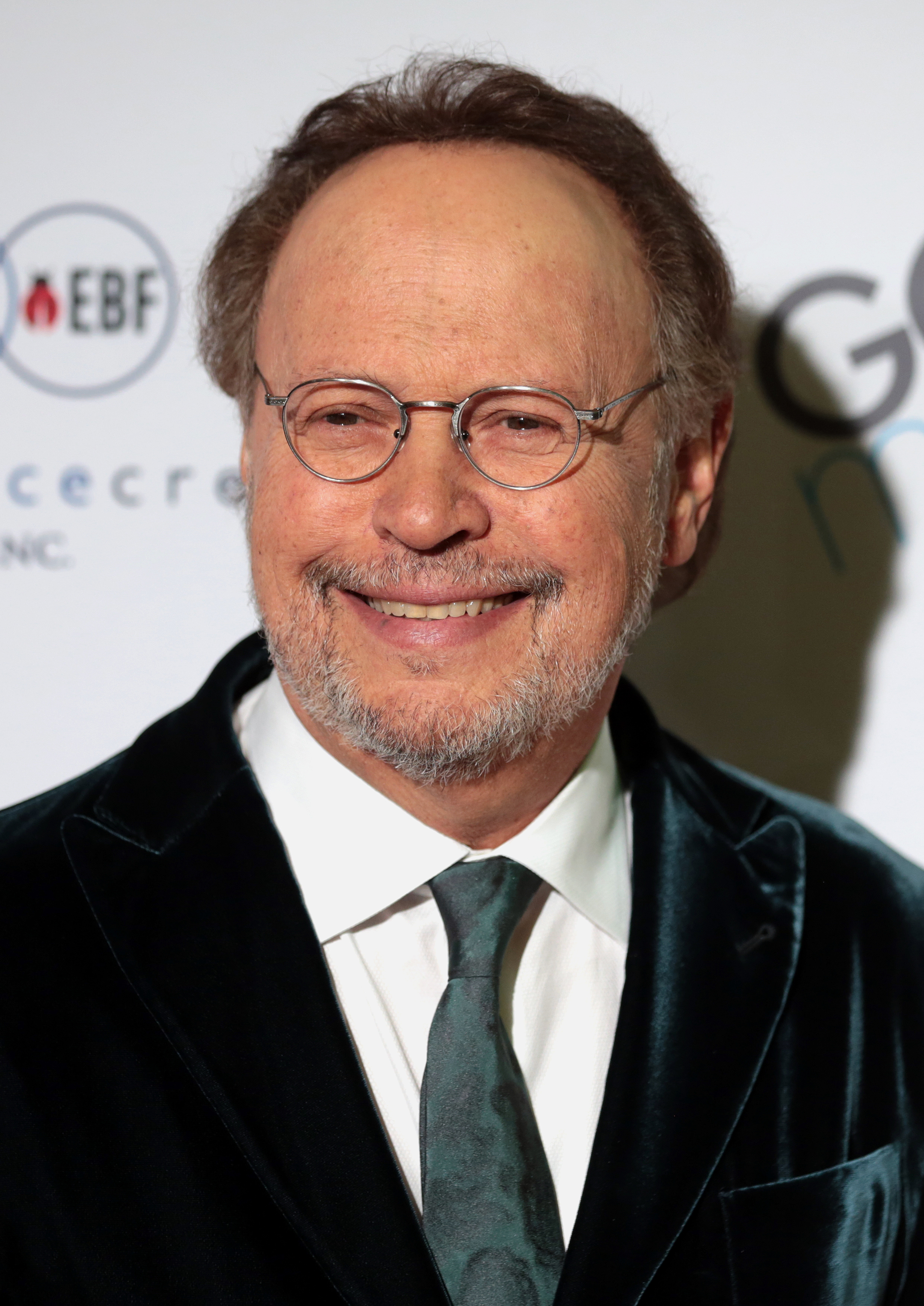
John Goodman and Billy Crystal reprised their roles as James P. Sullivan and Mike Wazowski from the films for the television series.

In April 2019, John Goodman and Billy Crystal were confirmed to be returning as both Sulley and Mike for the series alongside John Ratzenberger, Jennifer Tilly, and Bob Peterson, with the new cast including Ben Feldman, Kelly Marie Tran, Henry Winkler, Lucas Neff, Alanna Ubach, Stephen Stanton and Aisha Tyler. In February 2020, Anderson revealed that recording for the series had already begun. In March 2021, Mindy Kaling and Bonnie Hunt joined the cast, with Kaling replacing Tran as Val Little and Hunt reprising her role as Mrs. Flint from the original film. In an interview with The New York Times, it was confirmed that Boo, the human child that Sulley and Mike befriended in the original film, would not be making an appearance. Bobs Gannaway stated that he had discussions with Monsters, Inc. director Pete Docter, and they both agreed that they wanted to keep the relationship ambiguous, with Gannaway stating, "Everyone agreed that we wanted to leave it to the world to decide how that relationship continued."

Season two brings back Steve Buscemi as Randall Boggs. The crew kept the character's appearance a secret with the script naming him "Edward", after executive producer Edward Mejia.

=== Animation and design ===
Animation for the series was produced by both Dwarf Animation Studio in Pérols and ICON Creative Studio in Vancouver. Animation work began shortly before Disney Television Animation was closed in response to the COVID-19 pandemic, forcing the producers to continue work remotely. According to Anderson, work on storyboards and layouts for the second and third episodes were done remotely during the pandemic.

=== Music ===
British composer Dominic Lewis (who previously scored the 2017 reboot of DuckTales) was announced as the series composer. Lewis said the score was mainly inspired by Randy Newman's jazzy score from the first film. Lewis also performed the theme song, which is an a cappella rendition of Newman's opening credits music from the first film. The soundtrack album was released digitally and on streaming on July 9, 2021. Starting with the second season, Daniel Futcher co-composed the score with Lewis.

Monsters at Work

Soundtrack album by Dominic Lewis
- Released: July 9, 2021
- Recorded: 2020–2021
- Genre: Soundtrack
- Length: 37:26
- Label: Walt Disney Records
- Producer: Dominic Lewis

==== Track listing ====
All tracks are written by Dominic Lewis.

No.	Title	Writer(s)	Length
1.	"Monsters at Work Main Title - A Cappella"	Randy Newman	2:09
2.	"Comedy Can Be Dangerous" (Performed by Billy Crystal)	Randy Rogel	0:48
3.	"Don't Stop Now"		1:08
4.	"End of the Line"		1:21
5.	"Friends"		1:22
6.	"World on Fire"		2:12
7.	"I'm Not Gonna Sing You a Song" (Performed by Billy Crystal)	Danny Jacob (m) & Bobs Gannaway (l)	1:04
8.	"Scarer Cum Laude"		2:19
9.	"MIFTers MIFTers"		1:43
10.	"36 1/2 Hour Energy Drink"		1:13
11.	"Googly Bear Trapped"		3:48
12.	"I Know Bowlers"		1:06
13.	"Angel Hair"		2:06
14.	"Get Giggles"		4:36
15.	"The Doors"		3:12
16.	"Official Jokester"		4:08
17.	"Monsters at Work Main Title - Instrumental"	Newman	2:17
18.	"Monsters at Work Main Title - Toy Piano"	Newman	0:47
Total length:			37:26

== Marketing ==
A teaser trailer for the series was released on May 18, 2021. The first trailer for the series was released on June 11, 2021.

== Release ==
Monsters at Work debuted on July 7, 2021, on Disney+, released weekly on Wednesdays, and consisted of 10 episodes. The series was previously set to be released sometime in 2020, but it was delayed to early 2021, then to July 2, 2021, then finally to its current release date, with a two-episode premiere. The series made its linear premiere on Disney Channel on January 6, 2023, and on Disney XD on January 9, 2023. During New York Comic Con on October 15, 2023, it was revealed that the second season would premiere in 2024. The second season premiered on April 5, 2024, with the first-run airings moved to Disney Channel before being added to Disney+ on May 5, 2024.

== Reception ==
=== Streaming viewership ===
Whip Media, which tracks viewership data for over 1 million daily users worldwide of its TV Time app, calculated that Monsters at Work was the 3rd most-anticipated new streaming television series of July 2021. According to market research company Parrot Analytics, which looks at consumer engagement in consumer research, streaming, downloads, and on social media, the series had the second-largest month-on-month growth in demand in July 2021. The show saw a 225% increase in demand compared to June. Whip Media later reported that Monsters at Work was the top-rising show based on the highest week-over-week growth in episodes watched for the week ended on July 11, 2021. Parrot Analytics reported that it was the third most in-demand new series in the U.S. for Q3 2021. It garnered 15 times more demand than the average show, following behind What If...? and Nine Perfect Strangers.

=== Critical response ===
The review aggregator website Rotten Tomatoes reported a 65% approval rating for season one, with an average score of 6.2/10 based on 26 critic reviews. The website's critics consensus reads, "If Monsters at Work doesn't quite capture the magic of the original film, it's charming and silly enough to entertain fans of all ages." Metacritic, which uses a weighted average, assigned season one a score of 55 out of 100 based on 9 critics, indicating "mixed or average" reviews.

Petrana Radulovic of Polygon praised the animation of the series, complimented its humor, and found the premise interesting, writing, "With a huge cast of characters and humor that waddles along the line between silliness and sharp societal commentary, Monsters at Work balances a whole lot." Brian Lowry of CNN gave the show a positive review and said, "The show doesn't deliver belly laughs, but it nimbly slides into the Monsters [Inc.] timeline and cleverly builds on a particularly fertile Pixar concept." Ashley Moulton of Common Sense Media rated the series 4 out of 5 stars, praised the depiction of positive messages, citing perseverance and acceptance, and complimented the presence of role models, saying, "Most characters model pro-social behaviors like friendliness and working hard." Alan Sepinwall of Rolling Stone rated the show 3.5 out of 5 and stated, "Combine them with some well-executed slapstick set pieces that evoke the two movies without feeling like rehashes, and the early episodes set up the foundation for a solid all-ages comedy." Ben Travers of Indiewire gave the show a 'B−' score and stated, "If you love original movies and were expecting a third, Monsters at Work might be a bit disappointing. But if you can still appreciate the world-building, [the] series might still hit its laugh quotas." Richard Roeper of Chicago Sun-Times gave the show 3 out of 4 and stated, "Monsters at Work isn't on the same level as the two feature films, but it's miles ahead of the likes of The Return of Jafar or Kronk's New Groove."

Scott Bryan of BBC gave the show a negative review and stated, "As someone who loves the films, I wonder ... do we need more of it? The films are so well self-contained. This feels like an excess of something we don't really need." Chris Vognar of San Francisco Chronicle rated the show 2 out of 4 and wrote, "This is a solid effort, even if it doesn't quite shimmer like your top-of-the-line Pixar favorites." Brian Tallerico of RogerEbert.com gave the show a negative review and stated, "Any hope that the Pixar charm would rub off on a Pixar show like Monsters at Work doesn't pay off in the first two episodes." Lucy Mangan of The Guardian gave the show 2 out of 5 stars and stated, "It feels like a long wait at times. The first two half-hour episodes (the only ones of the 10 that were available for review) are extraordinarily slow." Anita Singh of The Daily Telegraph gave the show 2 out of 5 and stated, "Bafflingly, it's a workplace comedy. Note to Disney: children don't go to work."

=== Accolades ===
Award	Date of ceremony	Category	Recipient	Result	Ref.
Children's and Family Emmy Awards	December 10–11, 2022	Outstanding Casting for an Animated Program	Aaron Drown, Colleen Nuño-O’Donnell, Julia Pleasants, David H. Wright III	Nominated	
Children's and Family Emmy Awards	December 10–11, 2022	Outstanding Editing for an Animated Program	Christopher Gee, Dan Molina, Jhoanne Reyes, Shawn Lemonnier	Nominated	
Children's and Family Emmy Awards	December 10–11, 2022	Individual Achievement in Animation	Ron Tolentino Velasco, Character Designer	Won	
Children's and Family Emmy Awards	March 15, 2025	Outstanding Voice Performer in a Children's or Young Teen Program	Ben Feldman	Nominated	
Children's and Family Emmy Awards	March 15, 2025	Outstanding Directing for an Animated Series	Kay Hayes and Stevie Wermers-Skelton (for "Descent Into Fear")	Nominated	
Children's and Family Emmy Awards	March 15, 2025	Voice Directing for an Animated Series	Kevin Deters & Stevie Wermers	Won	
Children's and Family Emmy Awards	March 15, 2025	Outstanding Casting for an Animated Program	Aaron Drown, Colleen Nuño-O’Donnell and Julia Pleasants	Nominated	
Children's and Family Emmy Awards	March 15, 2025	Outstanding Sound Editing and Sound Mixing for an Animated Program	Eric Freeman, Todd Toon, Nicole A. Fletcher, Doc Kane, Mark Kondracki, Paul McGrath, Odin Benitez, Warren Shaw and Bastien Benkhelil	Nominated	
GLAAD Media Award	March 27, 2025	Outstanding Kids and Family Programming - Animated	"Powerless"	Nominated	
