= Pope Dreams =

- Movie Poster
- Directed by: Patrick Hogan
- Written by: Patrick Hogan
- Produced by: Steve Loh
- Starring: Phillip Vaden; Julie Hagerty; Stephen Tobolowsky
- Cinematography: John Ealer
- Edited by: Mae Edwards
- Music by: Joel J. Richard
- Distributed by: PorchLight Entertainment
- Release date: 27 April 2006 (Newport Beach International Film Festival)
- Country: United States
- Language: English

Pope Dreams, also known as Music for My Mother, is a 2006 film written and directed by Patrick Hogan. The film won five awards at various film festivals.

== Premise ==
An aspiring drummer wants his dying mother to get an audience with the pope while he also tries to impress a girl out of his league.

== Principal cast ==
- Phillip Vaden as Andy Venable
- Marnette Patterson as Brady Rossman
- Julie Hagerty as Kristina Venable
- Stephen Tobolowsky as Carl Venable
- Noel Fisher as Pete
- Samantha Anderson as Heather
- Casey Barclay as Eric
- Jordan Belfi as Lucas

== Reception ==
DVDTalk recommended the film and said it "has a welcome honesty and heart to it that, when bolstered by such skillful performances, makes it well worth hunting down." FilmThreat gave it a positive review.
