= St. Luke's Theatre =

Off-Broadway theatre in Manhattan, New York

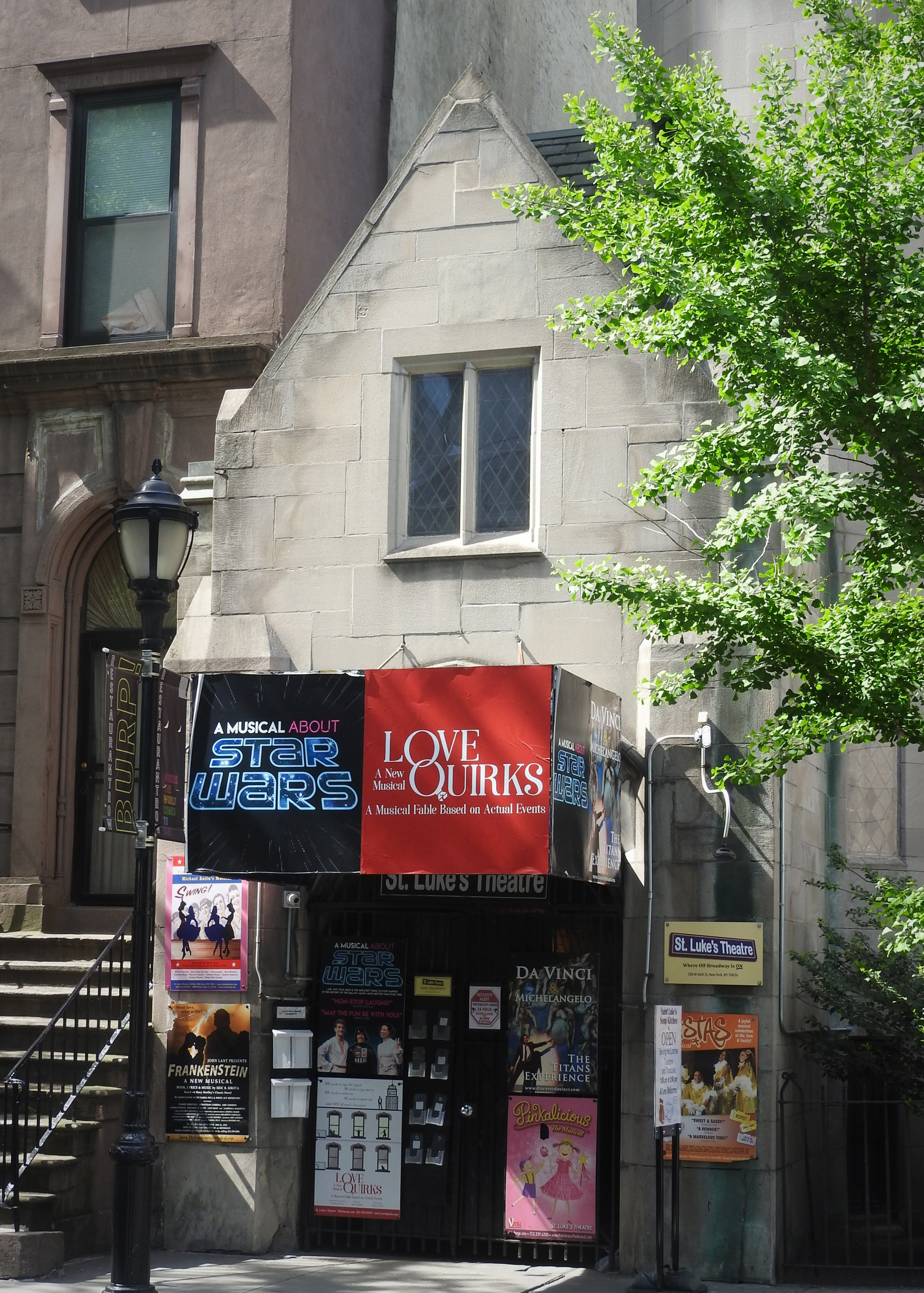
- Interactive map of St. Luke's Theatre
- Address: 308 West 46th Street (just west of 8th Ave); Manhattan, New York 10036; United States
- Coordinates: 40.759789°N 73.988242°W
- Owner: St. Luke's Lutheran Church
- Capacity: 174
- Type: Off-Broadway
- Current use: Naked Angels
- Public transit: New York City Subway: 42nd Street–Port Authority Bus Terminal (A, C, and E trains); 50th Street (C and E trains); 50th Street (1 train); 49th Street (N, R, and W trains)

Construction
- Years active: 1995–2020, 2022–2025, 2026–present

Tenant
- Out of the Box Theatrics

Website
- www.ootbtheatrics.com/st-lukes

St. Luke's Theatre is a 174-seat Off-Broadway theatre at St. Luke's Lutheran Church at 308 West 46th Street, on Restaurant Row, just west of Eighth Avenue in Manhattan's Theater District.

Created by then-Pastor Dale Hansen, St. Luke's Theatre came about with the revitalization of Times Square and Restaurant Row. The theatre began operating in the mid 1990s and featured such early hits like Late Night Catechism, starring Maripat Donovan.

The theatre is owned by Saint Luke’s Lutheran Church and was managed by Entertainment Events in the late 1990s, then by West End Artists from 2006 to 2020. In 2026, it will become the new home of Off-Broadway company Out of the Box Theatrics and its company-in-residence, Naked Angels.

== Playhouse 46 at St. Luke's ==
In March 2020, the theatre was forced to close due to the COVID-19 pandemic. The church parted ways with the management company, refurbished the space, and created a new non-profit theatre company called Playhouse 46 at St. Luke's. The off-Broadway theatre re-opened on April 14, 2022 with its first show, Islander, A New Musical. Other shows included Stranger Sings, a parody of Stranger Things; and The Creeps.

Playhouse 46 at St. Luke's closed in February 2025, due to mounting debt and a struggle to maintain bookings.

== Out of the Box Theatrics ==
In October 2025, Out of the Box Theatrics, an Off-Broadway theatre company founded in 2015 by Elizabeth Flemming, announced that it would relocate its operations to St. Luke's Theatre. The move follows the company's ongoing partnership with Naked Angels, which serves as a company in residence at Out of the Box Theatrics. Since 2026, both organizations have shared the venue.
