= Jesse Tyler Ferguson =

American actor (born 1975)

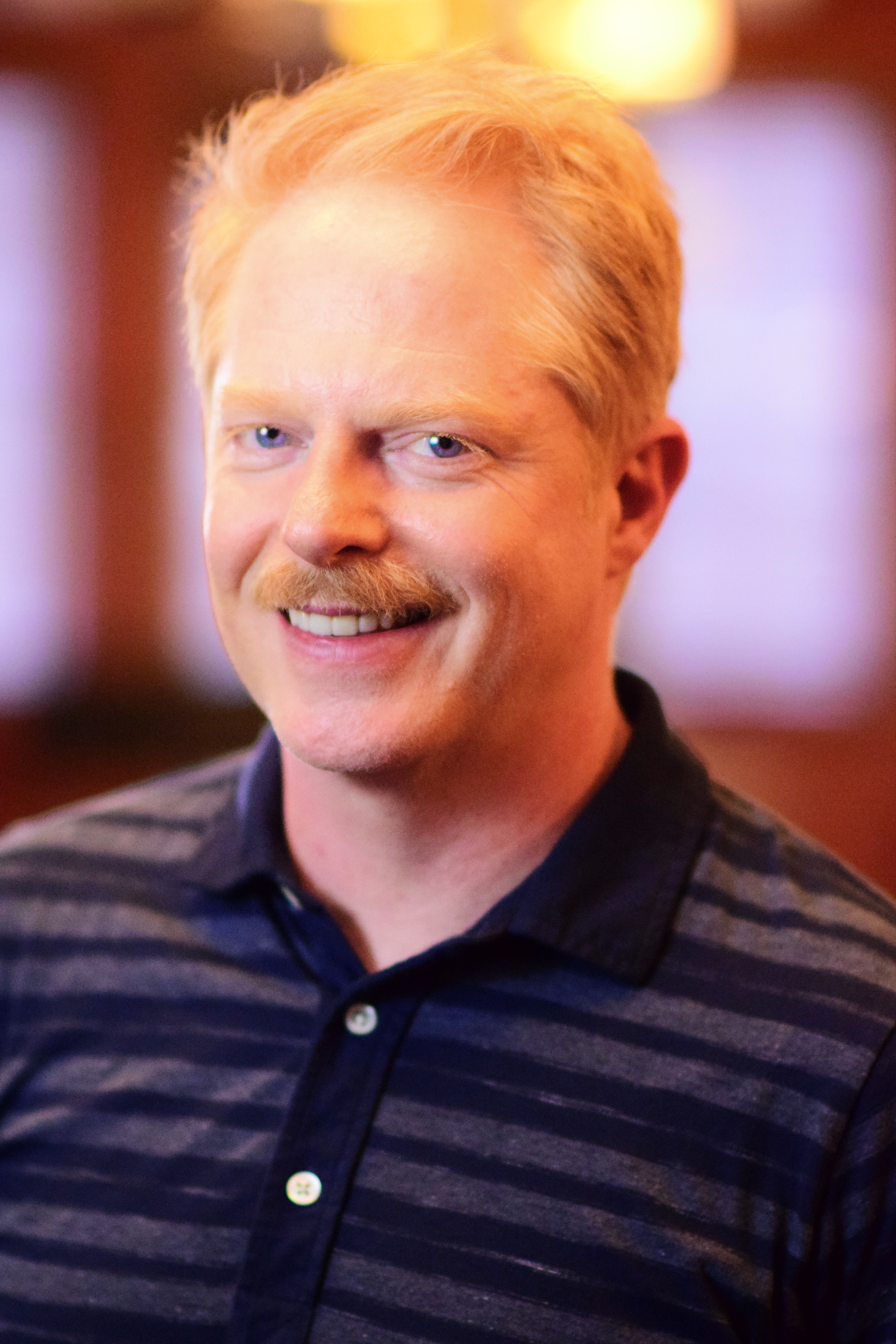
- Ferguson in 2022
- Born: October 22, 1975 (age 51); Missoula, Montana, U.S.
- Education: American Musical and Dramatic Academy
- Occupation: Actor
- Years active: 1998–present
- Spouse: Justin Mikita (m. 2013)
- Children: 2
- Website: www.jessetylerferguson.com

Jesse Tyler Ferguson (born October 22, 1975) is an American actor. From 2009 to 2020, he portrayed Mitchell Pritchett on the sitcom Modern Family, for which he earned five consecutive nominations for the Primetime Emmy Award for Outstanding Supporting Actor in a Comedy Series. He is also known for his theatrical work, winning a Tony Award in 2022 for Best Featured Actor in a Play for Take Me Out, and originating the role of Leaf Coneybear in the original Broadway cast of The 25th Annual Putnam County Spelling Bee in 2006.

Ferguson made his Broadway debut in On the Town (1998). He has appeared in numerous productions of Shakespeare in the Park, acting in A Midsummer Night's Dream (2007), A Winter's Tale (2010), The Merchant of Venice (2010), The Tempest (2015), and Twelfth Night; or What You Will (2025). In 2016, he starred on Broadway in Fully Committed, for which he won the Drama Desk Award for Outstanding Solo Performance.

== Early life ==
Jesse Tyler Ferguson was born on October 22, 1975 in Missoula, Montana, to Anne Ferguson (née Doyle; 1948–2024) and Robert "Bob" Ferguson (born 1946). He was named after his paternal grandmother, Jessie Uppercue Ferguson, to whom he was very close growing up. He was also named after his paternal great-grandfather, Jesse. He has a brother, Benjamin Ferguson, and a sister, Kelly Ferguson.

His family moved to Albuquerque, New Mexico, where he was raised. At age eight, Ferguson decided to become an actor, and joined the Albuquerque Children's Theater, where he was a member for six years. While attending St. Pius X High School, Ferguson acted in the musicals Bye Bye Birdie and Li'l Abner. He participated on the speech and debate team and graduated in 1994. He worked as a dancer/singer at Cliff's Amusement Park. Ferguson was 18 years old when his parents divorced. After high school, Ferguson attended The American Musical and Dramatic Academy (AMDA) in New York City.

== Career ==
=== Theater ===
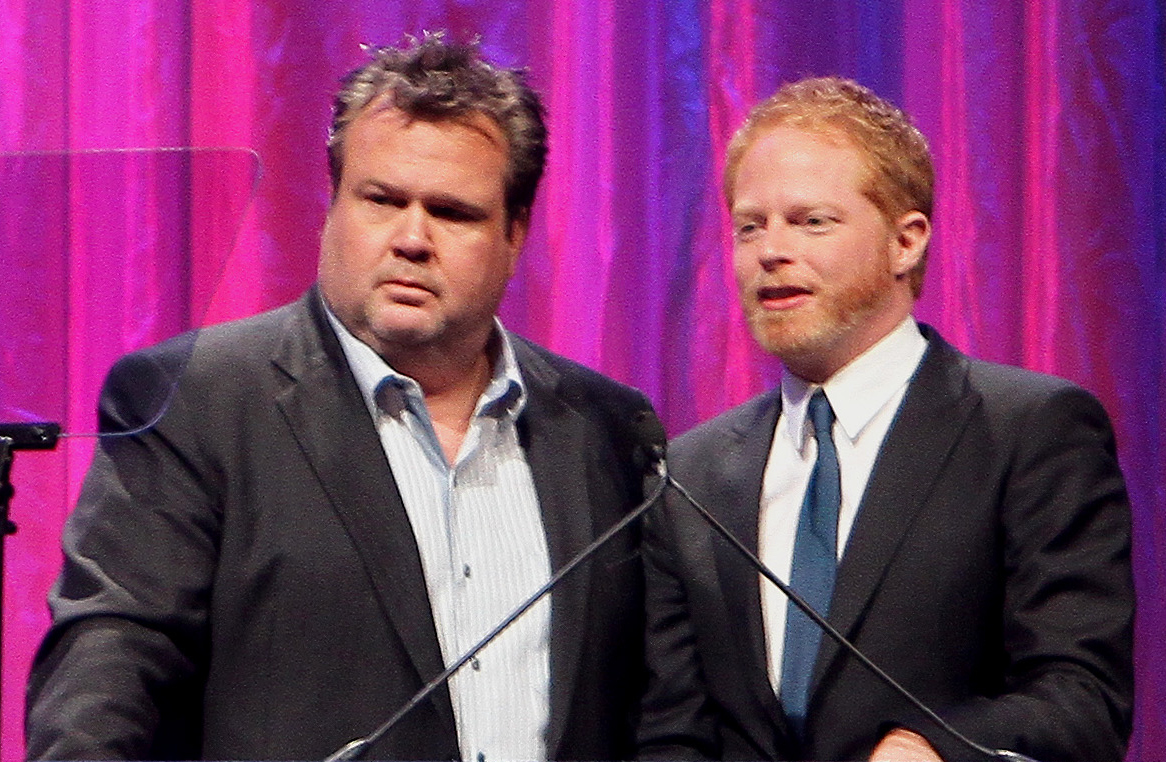
Jesse Tyler Ferguson with Modern Family co-star Eric Stonestreet at the 2010 HRC National Dinner

In New York City, Ferguson worked mainly in Off-Broadway and Broadway theatre, including the Tony Award-winning The 25th Annual Putnam County Spelling Bee, where he originated the role of Leaf Coneybear. Ferguson starred in the Public Theater's 2007 Shakespeare in the Park production of A Midsummer Night's Dream and 2015 production of The Tempest. In the summer of 2015, he played Sir Robin in the Hollywood Bowl production of Monty Python's Spamalot.

In March 2012, Ferguson was featured as Dr. Ilan Meyer in a performance of Dustin Lance Black's play 8, a staged reenactment of Perry v. Brown, the federal trial that overturned California's Proposition 8 ban on same-sex marriage. The production was held at the Wilshire Ebell Theatre and broadcast on YouTube to raise money for the American Foundation for Equal Rights, a non-profit organization funding the plaintiffs' legal team and sponsoring the play. He appeared in the 2022 Broadway revival of Take Me Out, for which he won a Tony Award.

In February 2026, Jesse Tyler Ferguson starred as Truman Capote in an Off-Broadway immersive revival of the play Tru at an Upper East Side mansion in the Library of the House of the Redeemer. Directed by Rob Ashford, Fergussen was joined by Tony nominee actress, Charlotte d'Amboise. Ferguson received a 2026 Drama League Distinguished Performance nomination for his performance.

=== Television and film ===
On television, Ferguson was among the large ensemble cast on the short-lived CBS sitcom The Class, playing Richie Velch. Ferguson also played a role in the 2008 thriller Untraceable.

From 2009 to 2020, he played the role of Mitchell Pritchett, the openly gay lawyer on the ABC sitcom Modern Family. For his performance, Ferguson received five consecutive Emmy Award nominations for Outstanding Supporting Actor in a Comedy Series. He also appeared as a judge on So You Think You Can Dance and opposed actress Chrissy Metz in a 2017 episode of TBS's Drop the Mic. In 2020, he co-hosted HGTV's Extreme Makeover: Home Edition replacing Ty Pennington.

=== Other works ===
In 2018, Ferguson was one of the actors who voiced the audiobook A Day in the Life of Marlon Bundo.

In 2019, Ferguson appeared in Taylor Swift's music video for "You Need to Calm Down".

In 2026, Ferguson voiced Monsieur Firmin in Erin A. Craig's audiobook Our Strange Duet (2026), a new reimagining and followup to Andrew Lloyd Webber's musical The Phantom of the Opera.

== Philanthropy ==
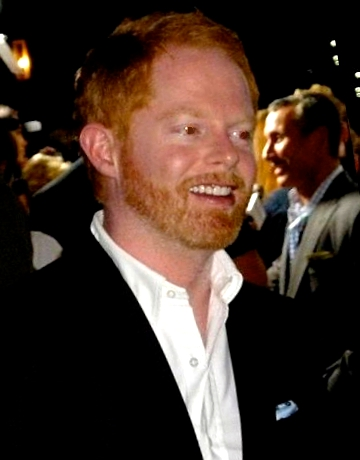
Ferguson at a PFLAG event in 2010

In September 2012, Ferguson and his lawyer husband, Justin Mikita, started the non-profit charity Tie The Knot, an effort to raise funds in support of same-sex marriage, using bow ties sold to retail. They officially launched it as their engagement announcement in an online video where they explain only seven states at the time had same-sex marriage. In an interview Ferguson stated that he wanted to do something that was smaller and manageable in case it did not work out as a business model.

The foundation sells limited-edition bow ties to support organizations that advocate for same-sex marriage. Their collections are designed by the couple plus guest designers, and is sold by The Tie Bar, a Naperville, Illinois-based online men's neckwear company.

In January 2013, the couple were recruited by Lieutenant Governor of Illinois Sheila Simon to lobby legislators to pass SB10 which would allow same-sex marriage. The bill passed both legislative houses, and Governor Pat Quinn signed the bill into law, going into effect on June 1, 2014.

In October 2013, the American Civil Liberties Union named Ferguson the celebrity ambassador for the LGBT community. He participated heavily in the ACLU's "Out for Freedom" campaign They noted that Ferguson travelled to New Mexico, his home state, to take part in same sex marriage efforts. Before the state's full legalization of same-sex marriage on December 19, 2013, New Mexico did not explicitly permit or prohibit same-sex marriage; it was the only state lacking a statute or constitutional provision explicitly addressing same-sex marriage. The couple's non-profit made a grant of US$10,000 to the ACLU of New Mexico for same sex efforts.

In November 2013, a pop-up retail store for 'Tie The Knot' was located at the Los Angeles Beverly Center featuring the fourth collection from the couple, including professional athlete designs with Scott Fujita and Chris Kluwe, and Brittney Griner.

== Personal life ==
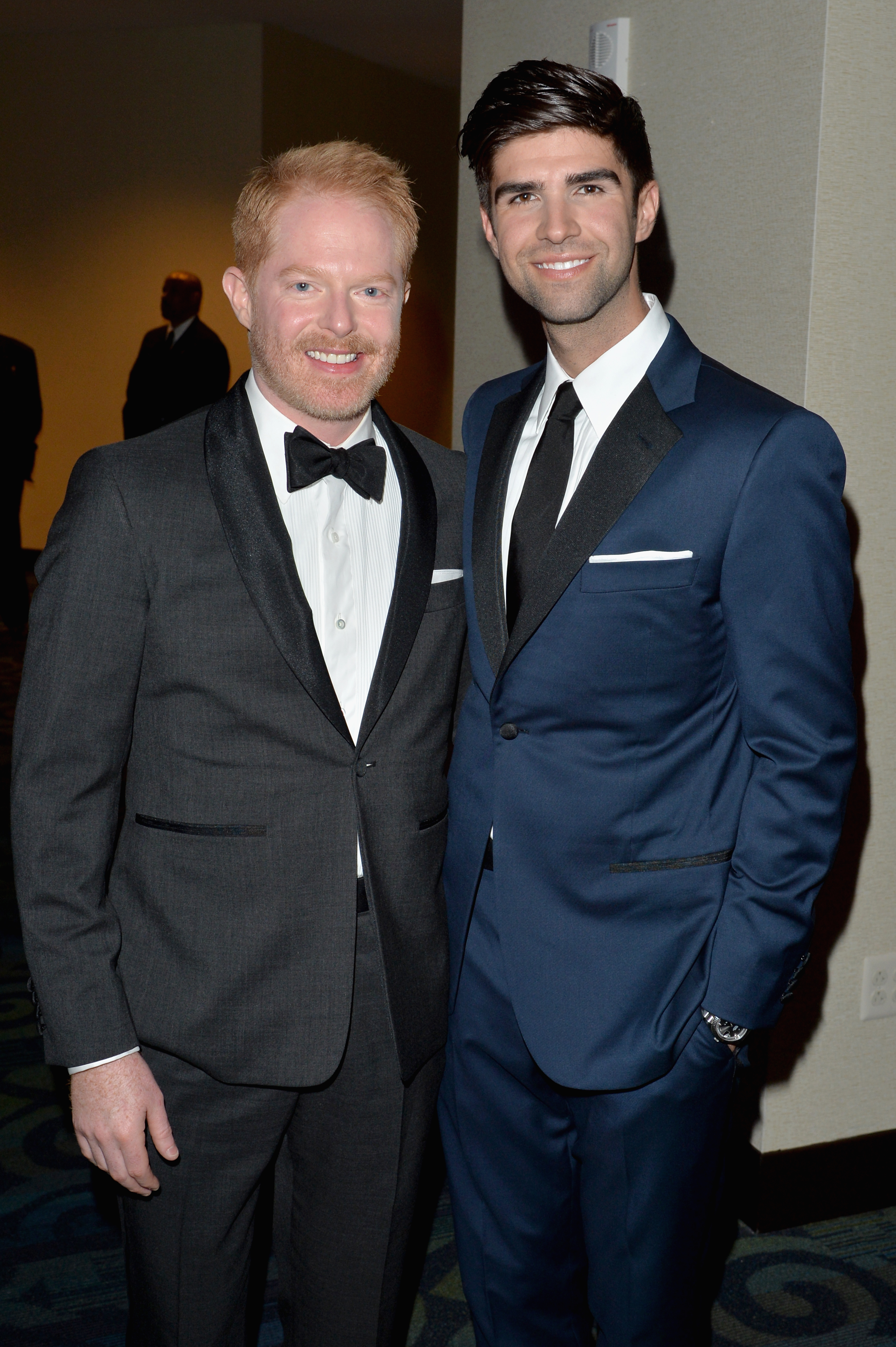
Ferguson with Justin Mikita in 2014

Ferguson uses his full name, as there was already an actor called Jesse Ferguson in the actors' union when he joined.

In September 2012, he announced his engagement to lawyer Justin Mikita, his boyfriend of nearly two years. They married in Manhattan on July 20, 2013, with the playwright and screenwriter Tony Kushner officiating at their wedding. The couple have two children born through surrogacy; their first son was born on July 7, 2020 and their second son was born on November 15, 2022.

On the process of coming out, he said he had to tell his father three times (when he was 17, 19 and 21): "It's a coming out process for them as well, and it takes time".

He has a dog named Leaf, named after Leaf Coneybear, a character he created in The 25th Annual Putnam County Spelling Bee on Broadway. He is a supporter of the Democratic Party and is shown in the 2016 Democratic National Convention promotional trailer "Our Fight Song".

== Acting credits ==
=== Film ===
Year	Title	Role	Notes
2001	Ordinary Sinner	Ogden	
2004	Mercury in Retrograde	Duane	Short film
2006	Griffin & Phoenix	Student	
2008	Untraceable	Arthur James Elmer	
2009	Wonderful World	Cyril	
2012	The Procession	Jason	Short film
2012	8	Dr. Ilan Meyer	
2012	Red	Frank Jenkowski	Short film
2016	Ice Age: Collision Course	Shangri Llama (voice)	
2023	Cocaine Bear	Peter	
2024	All That We Love	Stan	
2025	A Very Jonas Christmas Movie	Santa Claus	
2026	Stop! That! Train!	Business Person	

=== Television ===
Year	Title	Role	Notes
2000	Sally Hemings: An American Scandal	Young Tom Hemings	TV film
2002	Absolutely Fabulous	Uncredited	Episode: "Gay"
2006–2007	The Class	Richie Velch	19 episodes
2007, 2010	Ugly Betty	Dr. Gabe Farkas	2 episodes: "Icing on the Cake" (2007) / "The Passion of the Betty" (2010)
2008	Do Not Disturb	Larry	5 episodes
2009–2015	The Battery's Down	Shamus McKelvy	2 episodes
2009–2020	Modern Family	Mitchell Pritchett	Main character
2011–2013	So You Think You Can Dance	Himself	Guest judge; 7 episodes
2012	Submissions Only	Jared Halstead	Episode: "Another Interruption"
2012	RuPaul's Drag Race	Himself	Episode: "Dads I'd Like to Frock"
2012	Who Do You Think You Are?	Himself	Season 5 episode 2
2013	2013 Do Something Awards	Honoree	TV film
2013–2014	Web Therapy	Steve Olson	5 episodes
2013	Hot in Cleveland	Wes	Episode: "Love Is All Around"
2013	Project Runway	Himself	Guest judge; Episode: "Tie the Knot"
2015	Comedy Bang! Bang!	Himself	Episode: "Jesse Tyler Ferguson Wears a Brown Checked Shirt and Stripey Socks"
2015	Running Wild with Bear Grylls	Himself	Episode: "Jesse Tyler Ferguson"
2017	Nightcap	Himself	Episode: "Always a Beard, Never a Bride"
2017	Drop the Mic	Himself	Episode: "David Arquette vs. Brian Tyree Henry / Jesse Tyler Ferguson vs. Chrissy Metz"
2017–2022	Pete the Cat	Syd	17 episodes
2020	Extreme Makeover: Home Edition	Host	8 episodes
2020	A Modern Farewell	Himself	Modern Family documentary
2021	The Good Fight	Garrison Vitar	Episode: "And the Two Partners Had a Fight..."
2021	Martha Gets Down and Dirty	Himself	Episode: "You Grow Girl"
2022	High School Musical: The Musical: The Series	Marvin	Episode: "Into The Unknown"
2024	Elsbeth	Skip Mason	Episode: "Reality Shock"
2024	Dinner Time Live with David Chang	Himself	Episode: "Pumpkin Spice"
2025	Mid-Century Modern	Tevin	Episode: "Working Girls"

=== Podcasts ===
Year	Title	Notes
2023-present	Dinner’s On Me	Host

=== Theatre ===
Year	Title	Role	Venue	Ref.
1997	On the Town	Chip	Delacorte Theatre, Off-Broadway	
1998–1999	On the Town	Chip	Gershwin Theatre, Broadway	
2001	Hair	General Grant	City Center Encores! Concert	
2003	Little Fish	Marco	Second Stage Theatre, Off-Broadway	
2004	Where Do We Live	Billy	Vineyard Theatre, Off-Broadway	
2005–2006	The 25th Annual Putnam County Spelling Bee	Leaf Coneybear	Circle in the Square Theatre, Broadway	
2005	On the Twentieth Century	Max Jacobs	New Amsterdam Theatre, Broadway concert	
2007	A Midsummer Night's Dream	Francis Flute	Shakespeare in the Park	
2010	The Winter's Tale	Shepard's Son	Shakespeare in the Park	
2010	The Merchant of Venice	Launcelot Gobbo	Shakespeare in the Park	
2012	The Producers	Leo Bloom	Hollywood Bowl	
2013	The Comedy of Errors	Dromio of Syracuse; Dromio of Ephesus	Shakespeare in the Park	
2015	Spamalot	Sir Robin	Hollywood Bowl	
2015	The Tempest	Trinculo	Shakespeare in the Park	
2016	Fully Committed	Sam and others	Lyceum Theatre, Broadway	
2018	Log Cabin	Ezra	Playwrights Horizons, Off-Broadway	
2022	Take Me Out	Mason Marzac	Helen Hayes Theatre, Broadway	
2023	Take Me Out	Mason Marzac	Gerald Schoenfeld Theatre, Broadway	
2023	Gutenberg! The Musical!	The Producer (one night only)	James Earl Jones Theatre, Broadway	
2025	Here We Are	Paul Zimmer	Lyttelton Theatre, National Theatre, London	
2025	Twelfth Night	Sir Andrew Aguecheek	Shakespeare in the Park, New York	
2026	Tru	Truman Capote	House of the Redeemer, Off-Broadway	
2026	Jesus Christ Superstar	King Herod	London Palladium, West End	
2026	Tru	Truman Capote	Menier Chocolate Factory, Off-West End	

=== Music videos ===
Year	Title	Artist	Role	Notes	Ref.
2012	"Glamazon"	RuPaul	Guest star		
2016	"Our Fight Song"	Various Artists	Himself		
2016	"Holy Shit (You Got to Vote)"	Various Artists	Himself		
2019	"You Need to Calm Down"	Taylor Swift	Himself	Cameo	

== Awards and nominations ==
Organizations	Year	Category	Work	Result	Ref.
Drama Desk Award	2005	Outstanding Ensemble Performance	The 25th Annual Putnam County Spelling Bee	Won	
Drama Desk Award	2016	Outstanding Solo Performance	Fully Committed	Won	
Drama Desk Award	2022	Outstanding Actor in a Play	Take Me Out	Nominated	
Drama League Awards	2022	Distinguished Performance Award	Take Me Out	Nominated	
Drama League Awards	2026	Distinguished Performance Award	Tru	Nominated	
MTV Video Music Awards	2019	Video of the Year	"You Need to Calm Down"	Won	
MTV Video Music Awards	2019	Video for Good	"You Need to Calm Down"	Won	
Outer Critics Circle Awards	2022	Outstanding Featured Actor in a Play	Take Me Out	Won	
People's Choice Awards	2012	Favorite TV Comedy Actor	Modern Family	Nominated	
People's Choice Awards	2013	Favorite TV Comedy Actor	Modern Family	Nominated	
People's Choice Awards	2016	Favorite Comedic TV Actor	Modern Family	Nominated	
Primetime Emmy Award	2010	Outstanding Supporting Actor in a Comedy Series	Modern Family (episode: "Family Portrait")	Nominated	
Primetime Emmy Award	2011	Outstanding Supporting Actor in a Comedy Series	Modern Family (episode: "Halloween")	Nominated	
Primetime Emmy Award	2012	Outstanding Supporting Actor in a Comedy Series	Modern Family (episode: "Leap Day")	Nominated	
Primetime Emmy Award	2013	Outstanding Supporting Actor in a Comedy Series	Modern Family (episode: "The Wow Factor")	Nominated	
Primetime Emmy Award	2014	Outstanding Supporting Actor in a Comedy Series	Modern Family (episode: "Message Received")	Nominated	
Screen Actors Guild Award	2009	Outstanding Ensemble in a Comedy Series	Modern Family (season 1)	Nominated	
Screen Actors Guild Award	2010	Outstanding Ensemble in a Comedy Series	Modern Family (season 2)	Won	
Screen Actors Guild Award	2011	Outstanding Ensemble in a Comedy Series	Modern Family (season 3)	Won	
Screen Actors Guild Award	2012	Outstanding Ensemble in a Comedy Series	Modern Family (season 4)	Won	
Screen Actors Guild Award	2013	Outstanding Ensemble in a Comedy Series	Modern Family (season 5)	Won	
Screen Actors Guild Award	2014	Outstanding Ensemble in a Comedy Series	Modern Family (season 6)	Nominated	
Screen Actors Guild Award	2015	Outstanding Ensemble in a Comedy Series	Modern Family (season 7)	Nominated	
Tony Awards	2022	Best Featured Actor in a Play	Take Me Out	Won	
