= Oh, Pioneers =

- Big Love episode
- Episode no.: Season 2 Episode 12
- Directed by: Julian Farino
- Written by: Dustin Lance Black; Eileen Myers; Mark V. Olsen; Will Scheffer
- Cinematography by: M. David Mullen
- Editing by: Byron Smith
- Original release date: August 26, 2007
- Running time: 55 minutes

Guest appearances
- Mary Kay Place as Adaleen Grant; Branka Katić as Ana Mesovich; Tina Majorino as Heather Tuttle; Lawrence O'Donnell as Lee Hatcher; Audrey Wasilewski as Pam Martin; Aaron Paul as Scott Quittman; Sylva Kelegian as ATF Agent; Mireille Enos as Kathy Marquart; Anne Dudek as Lura Grant; Wendy Phillips as Peg Embry; Eric Pierpoint as Larry Schoenfeld

Episode chronology
← Previous "Take Me As I Am"	Next → "Block Party"

"Oh, Pioneers" is the twelfth episode and season finale of the second season of the American drama television series Big Love. It is the 24th overall episode of the series and was written by Dustin Lance Black, Eileen Myers and series creators Mark V. Olsen and Will Scheffer, and directed by Julian Farino. It originally aired on HBO on August 26, 2007.

The series is set in Salt Lake City and follows Bill Henrickson, a fundamentalist Mormon. He practices polygamy, having Barbara, Nicki and Margie as his wives. The series charts the family's life in and out of the public sphere in their suburb, as well as their associations with a fundamentalist compound in the area. In the episode, Bill tries to remove Alby from power, while also forced to maintain Roman and Adaleen at his house.

According to Nielsen Media Research, the episode was seen by an estimated 2.88 million household viewers and gained a 1.4 ratings share among adults aged 18–49. The episode received generally positive reviews from critics, although some considered that the episode did not live up to the potential set up by the previous episode.

== Plot ==
Bill (Bill Paxton) testifies before the UEB, claiming that Alby (Matt Ross) is conspiring against his family. He fails to win over the board, and Alby forces him to leave. While visiting Roman (Harry Dean Stanton), Adaleen (Mary Kay Place) is horrified upon witnessing Alby and his wife Lura (Anne Dudek) administering lethal drugs into Roman.

As she prepares for Pioneer Day, Margie (Ginnifer Goodwin) tells Pam (Audrey Wasilewski) she cannot be her surrogate mother. However, she changes her mind when Pam tells her Carl may divorce her if they cannot have a baby. While meeting with Ana (Branka Katić), Margie finally reveals that Bill is her husband. Ana is angry upon her confession, but takes a pity on Margie when she opens up about wanting a friend. Nicki (Chloë Sevigny) is astonished when Adaleen arrives with Roman at her house, and despite their poor relationship, she agrees to help. Bill is forced to allow them to stay at their houses, while also building a case against Alby with the help of ATF. When Roman slightly recovers, Bill informs him that Alby has been poisoning him and using him to rise to power.

Sarah (Amanda Seyfried) and Heather (Tina Majorino) try to convince Ben (Douglas Smith) in renouncing his plans to become a polygamist. Ben is not convinced by their arguments, and defends his parents' lifestyle. Bill is surprised when the UEB votes for him to become a trustee, but he is not interested in the position. Therefore, Alby is named as the new chairman, and he promises to pursue Bill for his actions. To avoid more problems, Bill decides to allow Roman to return to Juniper Creek to take the position back from Alby. He asks to be allowed in keeping the Weber Gaming venture, and Roman agrees to respect his wishes. Upon discovering that Margie will be a surrogate mother, Bill forbids her from doing so. As Margie explains her decision to Pam, Barbara (Jeanne Tripplehorn) finally reveals that they are practice polygamy.

The Henricksons celebrate Pioneer Day at their house, with Bill and Ana now seemingly returning to a relationship. Barbara tells Bill that she told the truth to Pam, and Bill decides to name her as a board member of Weber Gaming. As Roman, Joey and Adaleen return to Juniper Creek, Roman is subsequently arrested by the police after Alby sets Roman up for having violated the Mann Act. Back home, as the family gathers for a Pioneer Day presentation, Bill ponders over his future.

== Production ==
=== Development ===
The episode was written by Dustin Lance Black, Eileen Myers and series creators Mark V. Olsen and Will Scheffer, and directed by Julian Farino. This was Black's fourth writing credit, Myers' fifth writing credit, Olsen's 13th writing credit, Scheffer's 13th writing credit, and Farino's third directing credit.

== Reception ==
=== Viewers ===
In its original American broadcast, "Oh, Pioneers" was seen by an estimated 2.88 million household viewers with a 1.4 in the 18–49 demographics. This means that 1.4 percent of all households with televisions watched the episode. This was a 23% increase in viewership from the previous episode, which was watched by an estimated 2.34 million household viewers with a 1.1/3 in the 18–49 demographics.

=== Critical reviews ===
"Oh, Pioneers" received generally positive reviews from critics. Trish Wethman of TV Guide wrote, "There are certainly some open questions as this season draws to a close, but this show did not require any dramatic cliff-hanger to keep us wondering. Fascinating characters and stories were what kept us hooked this summer, and that is what will bring me back for Season 3."

Emily Nussbaum of Vulture wrote, "It's all tied in to the usual Juniper Creek power plays, and by the end, Roman is in shackles, Sarah is de-virginified, and Alby is off somewhere chortling and scheming for season three."

Emily St. James of Slant Magazine wrote, "The second season finale of Big Love tries to do so many things at once that it periodically flies off the rails, only to find itself righted again by a single powerful scene or moment." Shirley Halperin of Entertainment Weekly wrote, "For the season 2 finale of Big Love, HBO did not overhype the action, and that was a good thing, because I found the episode disappointing. In fact, I'd venture to say that last week's setup episode may have bested this week's payoff. This is certainly not the way I envisioned starting a year-long break from my favorite show."

Jen Creer of TV Squad wrote, "Roman says, "Look at you now," as if who Bill has become has somehow made up for what Roman did to a young teenager, casting him out. I'm not therapist, but I think that statement was not necessarily a compliment. As long as Roman lives, Bill will never be free of Juniper Creek. However, he can't cut the strings and set himself free." Television Without Pity gave the episode a "B+" grade.

Julian Farino submitted this episode for consideration for Outstanding Directing for a Drama Series at the 60th Primetime Emmy Awards.
