= The Happiest Girl =

The Happiest Girl may refer to:

- The Happiest Girl (song), a 2022 a song by Blackpink
- The Happiest Girl (Big Love), an episode of the American TV series Big Love
