= Circle the Wagons =

Circle the Wagons may refer to:

- Circle the wagons, an English language idiom
- Wagon fort, source of the idiom
- Circle the Wagons (album), a 2010 album by Darkthrone
- Circle the Wagons (Big Love), an episode of the American TV series Big Love
