= 8 (play) =

2011 play by Dustin Lance Black

- Official Poster
- Written by: Dustin Lance Black; Kate Sullivan Gibbens
- Subject: Perry v. Schwarzenegger trial reenactment using original court transcripts and first-hand interviews of the people involved
- Genre: verbatim theatre documentary theatre

Premiere
- Date: September 19, 2011 (Broadway); March 3, 2012 (worldwide broadcast)
- Place: Eugene O'Neill Theatre; Ebell of Los Angeles broadcast live on YouTube
- Official website

8 is a 2011 American play that portrays the closing arguments of Perry v. Schwarzenegger, a federal trial that led to the overturn of Proposition 8, an amendment banning same-sex marriages in California. It was created by Dustin Lance Black in light of the court's denial of a motion to release a video recording of the trial and to give the public a true account of what transpired in the courtroom.

The play is written in the style of verbatim theatre reenactment, using transcripts from the trial, journalist records, and media interviews from the plaintiffs, defendants and proponents involved. 8 first premiered on September 19, 2011 at the Eugene O'Neill Theatre in New York City, and later broadcast worldwide from the Ebell of Los Angeles on March 3, 2012. Black brought the play to San Francisco, the home of the court case on which the play was based, on October 7, 2012 for a one-night-only reading at the ACT Theater. A cast reception following the reading included an appearance by the trial judge, Vaughn Walker. On October 22, 2012, another one-night-only reading was performed at the downtown Crest Theater in Sacramento, California, U.S.

The American Foundation for Equal Rights (AFER) and Broadway Impact, sponsors of the play, have licensed the play for readings nationwide on college campuses and in community theaters free of charge, as an educational tool.

A radio adaptation was broadcast on JOY 94.9, an LGBTIQ community radio station in Melbourne, Australia, on March 27, 2014.

== Context ==
In May 2009, AFER filed a lawsuit, Perry v. Schwarzenegger, in the U.S. District Court for the Northern District of California on behalf of plaintiffs, two same-sex couples, to challenge a voter-approved constitutional amendment, known as Proposition 8, that eliminated same-sex couples' right to marry in the state. The same-sex couples were represented by David Boies and former U.S. Solicitor General Theodore Olson, two high-profile attorneys who opposed each other in the U.S. Supreme Court case, Bush v. Gore.

== Cast and characters ==
The following is a list of the cast of characters, along with the actors that portrayed them in the play's premieres.

Character	Description	Broadway (2011)	Los Angeles broadcast (2012)	Sacramento (2012)
The Court
Vaughn Walker	Judge	Bob Balaban	Brad Pitt	Christopher Cabaldon
Theodore Olson	Lawyer for Plaintiffs	John Lithgow	Martin Sheen	Ben Patrick Johnson
David Boies	Lawyer for Plaintiffs	Morgan Freeman	George Clooney	Kurt Johnson
Charles J. Cooper	Lawyer for Defense	Bradley Whitford	Kevin Bacon	Matt K Miller
Court Clerk		Kate Shindle	Vanessa García	Jessica Goldman
The Plaintiffs
Kris Perry		Christine Lahti	Christine Lahti	Unknown
Sandy Stier		Ellen Barkin	Jamie Lee Curtis	Unknown
Spencer Perry	Son of Plaintiff	Jay Armstrong Johnson	Bridger Zadina	Austin Laut
Elliot Perry	Son of Plaintiff	Ben Rosenfield	Jansen Panettiere	Grant Laut
Jeff Zarrillo		Matt Bomer	Matt Bomer	Thai Rivera
Paul Katami		Cheyenne Jackson	Matthew Morrison	Evan Brienza
Witnesses for Plaintiffs
Nancy F. Cott, Ph.D.	Testified on the history of marriage	Yeardley Smith	Yeardley Smith	Robin Hushbeck
Gregory M. Herek, Ph.D.	Testified on the nature of homosexuality; sexual orientation	K. Todd Freeman	Rory O'Malley	Michael RJ Campbell
Ilan Meyer, Ph.D.	Testified on minority stress; stigma impacts; discrimination	Anthony Edwards	Jesse Tyler Ferguson	Eason Donner
Gary Segura	Testified on the vulnerability of gays and lesbians in the nation's political process	Stephen Spinella	James Pickens, Jr.	Nanci Zoppi
Ryan Kendall	Testified on being forced by parents to undergo "conversion therapy" as a youth	Rory O'Malley	Chris Colfer	Patrick Burns
Witnesses for Defense
David Blankenhorn	Testified on marriage being a socially-approved, sexual relationship between man and woman	Rob Reiner	John C. Reilly	Steve Minnow
William Tam	Testified on same-sex marriage leading to polygamy, pedophilia, and incest	Ken Leung	George Takei	Ben Phillips
Other characters
Evan Wolfson	Founder of Freedom to Marry	Larry Kramer	Cleve Jones	George Raya
Maggie Gallagher	NOM President (opponent of same-sex marriage)	Jayne Houdyshell	Jane Lynch	Janis Stevens
Broadcast Journalist		Campbell Brown	Campbell Brown	Unknown

== See also ==
- Same-sex marriage in the United States
- 8: The Mormon Proposition
