= Alfredo Morabia =

American historian

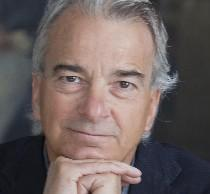
- Born: 2 November 1952 (age 73)
- Education: University of Geneva (MD); Johns Hopkins University (MPH, PhD, MHS)
- Known for: History of epidemiology
- Scientific career
- Fields: Medicine, epidemiology
- Workplaces: Barry Commoner Center for Health and the Environment, Queens College, City University of New York; Columbia University; University of Geneva
- Doctoral advisor: Moyses Szklo

Alfredo Morabia (born 2 November 1952) is a Swiss-American physician, epidemiologist, and historian of medicine. He is currently professor of epidemiology at the Barry Commoner Center for Health and the Environment at Queens College, City University of New York in addition to serving as professor of Clinical Epidemiology at the Department of Epidemiology at the Mailman School of Public Health, Columbia University and as Adjunct Professor of Epidemiology at the Harvard T. H. Chan School of Public Health.

Morabia served as the editor-in-chief of the American Journal of Public Health from 2015 to 2025. Morabia has also been editor of "Epidemiology in History" in the American Journal of Epidemiology. His expertise as a historian ranges from the history of scientific methods and concepts utilized to study population to urban health. He is the principal investigator of the World Trade Center-Heart cohort study, which delves into the long-term heart health of first responders from the 9/11, 2001 attack. He lectures and teaches on the history of epidemiology internationally in various languages.

== Biography ==
Morabia completed his undergraduate studies at Collège Calvin in Geneva in 1971, majoring in Greek and Latin. After receiving his M.D. from the School of Medicine at the University of Geneva in 1978, he was trained in internal medicine at the University Hospital of Geneva and in occupational medicine in Italy. In 2009, he was appointed Fellow of the Royal College of Physicians of Edinburgh.

In 1986, Morabia received a grant from the Swiss National Science Foundation to study at the Johns Hopkins School of Hygiene and Public Health, where he obtained M.P.H. and Ph.D. degrees in epidemiology and an M.H.S. in biostatistics.

In August 1990, he became chair of the Clinical Epidemiology Unit at the University Hospital of Geneva. The unit grew into a division, and Morabia was subsequently appointed professor of clinical epidemiology at the University of Geneva. In 1992, he created the "Bus Santé 2000" (Health Bus 2000) which is still in operation 30 years later.

Morabia has written and edited several books on epidemiology and public health. In 2004, he edited and contributed to A History of Epidemiologic Methods and Concepts and in 2014, he was supported by a grant from the National Library of Medicine (NLM) to write Enigmas of Health and Disease: How Epidemiology Helps Unravel Scientific Mysteries. In 2023, he published his first book on the history of public health, The Public Health Approach, also funded by an NLM grant.
