= The Journey of Jared Price =

- Theatrical release poster
- Directed by: Dustin Lance Black
- Written by: Dustin Lance Black
- Produced by: Bob Edgar; Robert Edgar; Greg Nimer
- Starring: Corey Spears; Josh Jacobson; Rocki Cragg; Steve Tyler
- Cinematography: Tony Croll
- Edited by: Tom Vater
- Music by: Damon Intrabartolo
- Production company: 10% Productions
- Distributed by: Alluvial Filmworks
- Release date: December 31, 2000
- Running time: 97 minutes
- Country: United States
- Language: English

The Journey of Jared Price is a gay-themed coming-of-age 2000 film written, produced and directed by Dustin Lance Black, and starring Corey Spears, Josh Jacobson, Rocki Cragg, and Steve Tyler. The Journey of Jared Price was Black's first feature film.

== Plot ==
Nineteen year old Jared arrives in Los Angeles from a small town in Georgia seeking a different life. When he arrives in L.A., he rents a room in a youth hostel that's furnished with bunk beds and already has one occupant, a male prostitute who needs to use their room to have sex with his clients some times. Jared of course doesn't like this arrangement but it's all he has at the moment. Jared finally lands a job as a sitter and caregiver to the blind Mrs. Haines. He is hired by her son Matthew, who is a movie executive, because he wants someone to spend time with his mother so he won't have to.

Jared meets Robert at the hostel. Robert is an openly gay teen who soon shows his attraction to Jared. Robert is very comfortable being gay, which leaves Jared feeling the opposite about his own sexual orientation. The film takes a further twist when Matthew asks Jared to move in with his mother, Mrs. Haines, so that he can also look after her at night. Because of the living situation at the hostel with his prostitute roommate, Jared agrees to move into Mrs. Haines' home. Soon after Jared moving in, it doesn't take long before Matthew gets Jared drunk and the two have sex. After Matthew decides not to give Jared a telephone message from Robert, and after Matthew fails to mention anything about his lover at home, Andrew, to Jared, Jared is faced with a difficult decision. Should he continue his relationship with Matthew or should he leave, ultimately being either homeless and jobless again?

== Cast ==
- Corey Spears ... Jared Price
- Steve Tyler ... Matthew Haines
- Mark Marsh ... Hostel Manager
- Jarrad Webster (Jared Lee Webster) ... Javier
- Josh Jacobson ... Robert
- Rocki Craigg ... Mrs. Haines
- Bryan Shyne ... Andrew
- Gillian Harris ... Kate

== Reception ==
AllMovie gave it a rating of. Billy Masters wrote in Hotspots Magazine that the movie had "the feel of a gay indie afterschool special" and that Corey Spears "gives a genuine and nuanced performance". John Petrakis of the Chicago Tribune gave it a rating of as well. He wrote that the film is a "gay variation of Sunset Boulevard without the cynicism and dark allure". However, he argues that "it turns darkly overwrought in the final stages, unfortunately undercutting its initial promise".

Black said that this is one of his projects that he wishes "would stay in the past". He recalls that he was in a local video store and saw a sign advertising The Journey of Jared Price, and asked them if he could take the sign down. Black said he rewrote the script in one day because it "read like soft-core porn". He further stated that he "took out all the sex and we shot it in four days for like 15 grand". In the end, he said, "we all have to learn from our mistakes ... it's just some of our mistakes end up on DVD".
