= Message Received =

22nd episode of Modern Family season 5

- Modern Family episode
- Episode no.: Season 5 Episode 22
- Directed by: Jeffrey Walker
- Written by: Steven Levitan
- Production code: 5ARG19
- Original air date: May 7, 2014

Guest appearances
- Cameron Watson as Appraiser; Mark Proksch as Coleman

Episode chronology
← Previous "Sleeper"	Next → "The Wedding"
- Modern Family season 5

"Message Received" is the 22nd episode of the fifth season of the American sitcom Modern Family, and the series' 118th overall. It aired on May 7, 2014. The episode deals with themes of stepping outside one's comfort zone. While the episode touches on lighter plot elements such as Jay's household all trying new things, the name of the episode refers to the revealing conversation between Jay and Mitch regarding Jay's assertion that he does not feel free to hold his own beliefs or ideas.

The episode was written by Steven Levitan and directed by Jeffrey Walker. Jesse Tyler Ferguson submitted this episode for consideration at the 66th Primetime Emmy Awards, where he received a nomination for the Primetime Emmy Award for Outstanding Supporting Actor in a Comedy Series.

== Plot ==
Jay (Ed O'Neill) makes a sandwich for Manny (Rico Rodriguez), but Manny will not eat it because it contains pickles, which he dislikes. Jay decides that Manny must step out of his comfort zone and forces him to stay at the table until he eats a pickle. However, Gloria (Sofía Vergara) manages to turn the tables on him when she obliges him to taste one of her mother's blood sausages, something with which he is not comfortable. Jay accepts, but in turn, encourages Gloria to confront her fear of petting Stella's belly. They all agree to do it simultaneously, and when they do, they are all disgusted, but at the end of the day, Gloria pets Stella's belly when no one is around, and Manny sneaks into the kitchen to eat a pickle.

Meanwhile, Haley (Sarah Hyland), Alex (Ariel Winter), and Luke (Nolan Gould) find a box that contains their parents' old mementos. One of these is Phil's (Ty Burrell) old answering machine, which has a saved message from Claire (Julie Bowen) in which she revealed she is pregnant with Haley (out of wedlock and following a Duran Duran concert). When Claire leaves for errands, they decide to send her an edited version of a phone call with her to try and get Phil to undo the dishwasher for them. However, Haley unknowingly edits it with the pregnancy message and sends it to Phil, who gets the message during a golf party and believes that Claire is pregnant again. When he comes home, he and Claire discover their kids have manipulated them, and they decide to get revenge by having a fake fight to scare the children. The trick takes another turn when Claire seemingly says that she would have married her ex-boyfriend instead of Phil, which upsets Phil, causing him to leave the fight. Claire comforts him by saying that he is always here to make her laugh, and she reminds him of the day when he and the kids created a soap fight when they had to wash the car and says she would not like to be anywhere else. She also thanks him for being happy when he thought she was pregnant.

Cam (Eric Stonestreet) and Mitch's (Jesse Tyler Ferguson) wedding day is approaching, and they are thousands of dollars over their budget. They realize that they will have to sell their own prized items since they can not cut anything from their wedding, and Mitch refuses to ask Jay for the money. Cam has an antique belt buckle, which turns out to be worth only $20. Mitch, meanwhile, possesses a rare vintage Spider-Man comic book that is worth $5,000. However, he gets distracted by a spider web and drops the comic book into a puddle, destroying its value.

Mitch and Cam rush to Jay's house asking for a hairdryer to dry the comic, but it is too late. When they explain their problem to Jay and Gloria, Jay suggests that the two cut back on the wedding and have a smaller ceremony. This leads to an argument over Jay not inviting friends from his golf club, and Jay admits he wouldn't feel comfortable inviting his friends to his son's gay wedding. He then admits that he doesn't approve of the wedding or understand why they even need to get married, believing he has done enough to be supportive but wants to express his own feelings of discomfort. Angry and upset, Mitch tells Jay not to attend the wedding if that's how he feels and storms out.

The episode ends with Haley, Alex, and Luke listening to an old message from Mitch, who explains to Phil that he is sorry that Jay did not have a better reaction when he learned that Claire was pregnant. He also assures him that Jay will either change his mind or it will be "his loss."

== Reception ==
=== Ratings ===
In its original American broadcast, "Message Received" was watched by 8.55 million; up by 0.16 from the previous episode.

=== Reviews ===
"Message Received" received highly positive reviews.

Joshua Alston from The A.V. Club awarded the episode an A and wrote that the script was "the perfect combination of sweet and tart". He positively compared the episode to season five's Las Vegas episode, stating, "As much of a triumph as 'Las Vegas' was, it was also a total outlier. It was a classically executed sitcom, but wasn't classic Modern Family. 'Message Received' is the genuine article". Alston further called it "a solid contender for [the show's] all-time best episode".

Madina Papadopoulos of Paste Magazine awarded the episode a 9.9/10, the highest of the season thus far. She opened her review by saying, "Modern Family took a sharp turn this week", and went on to praise the episode's emotional conclusion. She stated, "While comedy is meant to make you happy, it is best when it does not represent a happy world, but a real world. The scene between Jay and Mitch is a heartbreaking scene to watch, but its realism topped with the dialogue still manages to bring out laughter". She also labelled Mitch and Cam's wedding as "the TV wedding of the year".

Leigh Raines of TV Fanatic awarded the episode a 4/5 and singled out the episode's final scene. She said, "Modern Family strives to be realistic and, well "modern," and that fight is something that could very realistically happen. It was an honest moment between Jay and Mitchell confronting something that was uncomfortable for them".

However, Jordan Adler of We Got This Covered was less enthusiastic about the episode. He stated, "Average would be a perfect word to describe 'Message Received', an episode that squanders its interesting plots with contrived story beats".
