= Empire (Big Love) =

- Big Love episode
- Episode no.: Season 3 Episode 2
- Directed by: Jim McKay
- Story by: Dustin Lance Black
- Teleplay by: Dustin Lance Black; Mark V. Olsen; Will Scheffer
- Cinematography by: Alan Caso
- Editing by: Chris Figler
- Original release date: January 25, 2009
- Running time: 57 minutes

Guest appearances
- Bruce Dern as Frank Harlow; Mary Kay Place as Adaleen Grant; Robert Beltran as Jerry Flute; Branka Katić as Ana Mesovich; Lyndsy Fonseca as Donna; Tina Majorino as Heather Tuttle; Jenny O'Hara as Nita; Aaron Paul as Scott Quittman; Wendy Phillips as Peg Embry; Mark L. Young as Frankie

Episode chronology
← Previous "Block Party"	Next → "Prom Queen"

"Empire" is the second episode of the third season of the American drama television series Big Love. It is the 26th overall episode of the series and was written by co-producer Dustin Lance Black and series creators Mark V. Olsen and Will Scheffer from a story by Black, and directed by Jim McKay. It originally aired on HBO on January 25, 2009.

The series is set in Salt Lake City and follows Bill Henrickson, a fundamentalist Mormon. He practices polygamy, having Barbara, Nicki and Margie as his wives. The series charts the family's life in and out of the public sphere in their suburb, as well as their associations with a fundamentalist compound in the area. In the episode, Ana tries to get used to Bill's family, while the wives also face different challenges.

According to Nielsen Media Research, the episode was seen by an estimated 1.40 million household viewers. The episode received positive reviews from critics, although some expressed mixed reactions to the Juniper Creek subplot.

== Plot ==
As part of her relationship with Bill (Bill Paxton), Ana (Branka Katić) group-dates Barbara (Jeanne Tripplehorn), Nicki (Chloë Sevigny) and Margie (Ginnifer Goodwin) to get to know them as a family. Margie asks Bill to consider having a baby with Nicki, prompting the family to question why they have not been able to conceive a child. Nicki explains that Bill needs the blessing from Roman (Harry Dean Stanton), so Bill is forced to visit him. Roman says he will grant him his blessing if he can locate Rhonda, as her testimony could send him to prison and expose Bill's polygamy.

Bill and Don (Joel McKinnon Miller) have another meeting with Jerry Flute (Robert Beltran), but it ends badly as Don forgot to tell Bill about a model replica of the casino. When Bill scolds him, Don says he cannot provide him with more money, forcing Bill to ask Margie's help in building a model replica. While Jerry likes the model, he is still unsure of a partnership due to Bill's problems with Don, as well as the increasing disdain of polygamy by the public. Trying to save the pitch, Margie makes a crude remark on Jerry's Native American heritage, angering both Bill and Jerry. Sarah (Amanda Seyfried) surprises Scott (Aaron Paul) by announcing she has been accepted into Arizona State University. Barbara is surprised by the announcement, and Sarah reiterates it has to do with her new life.

In Juniper Creek, Kathy (Mireille Enos) fears over having to testify against Roman, but Alby (Matt Ross) threatens Joey (Shawn Doyle) into having her testify. Nicki visits Adaleen (Mary Kay Place), and her mother is angered when Nicki explains she does not want to have more children. Frank (Bruce Dern) visits Lois (Grace Zabriskie) to introduce her to Jodean (Enos), and they get into a physical fight. Frank's other wife, Nita (Jenny O'Hara), attacks Frank in order to save Lois. Lois is then forced to keep Frank tied at her house.

Barbara takes Nicki to a fertility doctor to check on her. Alone with the doctor, Nicki reveals she is taking birth control pills and asks for more prescriptions, feeling she is not ready to have more children. Frankie (Mark L. Young) takes Sarah and her friends with a few friends to use drugs, causing Scott to confront Sarah over her actions. Despite Scott offering to get a job near her, Sarah breaks up with him. Later, Sarah is revealed to be pregnant. Bill discovers that one of Don's wives has taken their kids, making his current marriage to Peg (Wendy Phillips) a case of monogamy. Despite Margie's comment, Jerry agrees to partner with Bill. Barbara is informed that she is not diagnosed with cervical cancer, and the family convinces Ana in joining them for a picnic.

== Production ==
=== Development ===
The episode was written by co-producer Dustin Lance Black and series creators Mark V. Olsen and Will Scheffer from a story by Black, and directed by Jim McKay. This was Black's fourth writing credit, Olsen's 15th writing credit, Scheffer's 15th writing credit, and McKay's third directing credit.

== Reception ==
=== Viewers ===
In its original American broadcast, "Empire" was seen by an estimated 1.40 million household viewers. This was a 20% increase in viewership from the previous episode, which was watched by an estimated 1.16 million household viewers with a 1.4 in the 18–49 demographics.

=== Critical reviews ===
"Empire" received positive reviews from critics. Amelie Gillette of The A.V. Club gave the episode an "A–" grade and wrote, "But even off the compound polygamy isn't the indoor picnic (could these family dates get any worse?) that it seems to be. This episode illustrated in no uncertain terms that the constant pursuit of the new (new wives, new babies, new sources of income) in polygamy often comes at the expense of the old."

Emily St. James of Slant Magazine wrote, "Sadly, no matter how hard the Juniper Creek stuff tries, it's just never going to be as compelling as what's going on at Henrickson Central, where the five most interesting characters (Bill, his three wives and his oldest daughter, Sarah) all got interesting storylines this week." Mark Blankenship of HuffPost gave the episode a "B+" grade and wrote, "So we end the episode in some murky moral terrain, where no one is completely right or wrong. That's enough to get me back next week. It would've been higher - especially because of the Vernie and Jo Jo stuff - but Sarah's pregnancy and Margene's lesson on tolerance were just too hokey to overlook."
