= American Journal of Public Health =

Peer-reviewed academic journal

- Discipline: Public health
- Language: English
- Edited by: Denys T. Lau

Publication details
- History: 1911–present
- Publisher: American Public Health Association (United States)
- Frequency: Monthly
- Open access: Delayed, after 10 years
- Impact factor: 9.6 (2025)

Standard abbreviations
- ISO 4: Am. J. Public Health

Indexing
- CODEN: AJHEAA
- ISSN: 0090-0036 (print); 1541-0048 (web)
- LCCN: 86655185
- OCLC no.: 228148667

Links
- Journal homepage; Online access; Online archive

The American Journal of Public Health is a monthly peer-reviewed public health journal that is independently published by the American Public Health Association. The Journal covers health policy and public health. The journal was established in 1911 and its stated mission is "to advance public health research, policy, practice, and education". The journal occasionally publishes themed supplements. The current editor-in-chief is Denys T. Lau.

== Reception ==
The journal was voted one of the 100 most influential journals in biology and medicine over the last 100 years by the Special Libraries Association. According to the Journal Citation Reports, the journal has a 2025 impact factor of 9.6.

== Editors-in-chief ==
Former editors-in-chief include:

- Alfredo Morabia (2015–2025)
- Mary Northridge (1998–2015)
- Mervyn Susser (1992–1998)
- Michel Ibrahim (1990–1991)
- Alfred Yankauer (1975–1990)
- George Rosen (1957–1973)
- Abel Wolman (1954–1957)
- Charles-Edward A. Winslow (1944–1954)
- Harry Mustard (1941–1944)
- Mazÿck Ravenel (1924–1940)
- Arthur Hedrich (1917–1922)
- Selskar Gunn (1914–1916)
- Livingston Farrand (1912–1913)
- Burt Rickards (1911–1911)

== Abstracting and indexing ==
The journal is abstracted and indexed in:

- Biological Abstracts
- BIOSIS Previews
- Chemical Abstracts Service
- CINAHL
- Current Contents/Clinical Medicine
- Current Contents/Life Sciences
- Current Contents/Social & Behavioral Sciences
- Embase/Excerpta Medica
- Food Science and Technology Abstracts
- Index Medicus/MEDLINE/PubMed
- Psychological Abstracts/PsycINFO
- Science Citation Index
- Scopus
- Social Sciences Citation Index

== About the title ==
The journal American Journal of Public Health should not be confused with The American Journal of Public Health, which is published by Directive Publications. Directive Publications has similarly mimicked the titles of other journals such as British Journal of Sports Medicine and The Journal of Clinical Endocrinology & Metabolism by adding or removing the word 'the'; they have been described as predatory by BMJ and the Endocrine Society.

== See also ==
- Progress in Community Health Partnerships
