= Dustin Lance Black =

American screenwriter, director, producer and activist

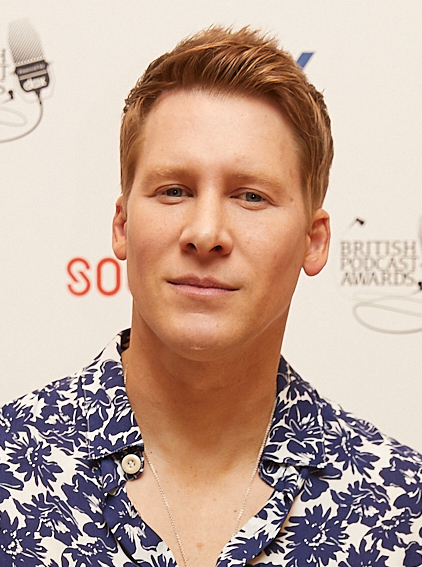
- Black at the 2019 British Podcast Awards
- Born: June 10, 1974 (age 52); Sacramento County, California, U.S.
- Education: University of California, Los Angeles (BA), Pasadena City College
- Occupations: Screenwriter, film director, film producer
- Years active: 2000–present
- Notable work: Big Love (2006–09); Milk (2008); 8 (2011)
- Board member of: American Foundation for Equal Rights
- Spouse: Tom Daley (m. 2017)
- Children: 2

Dustin Lance Black (born June 10, 1974) is an American screenwriter, director, producer, and LGBTQ rights activist. He is known for writing and producing the film Milk, for which he won the Academy Award for Best Original Screenplay in 2009. He also wrote the screenplay for the films J. Edgar, Rustin, and created the 2022 true crime limited series Under the Banner of Heaven.

Black is a founding board member of the American Foundation for Equal Rights, which brought the first Marriage Equality case to the U.S. Supreme court, and successfully overturned California's Proposition 8, bringing Marriage Equality back to California. Black was the playwright of 8, a staged re-enactment of the federal trial.

== Early life ==
Black's father walked out on his mother, who had polio, Roseanna, and his two brothers, Marcus Raul and Todd Bryant, when he was young. They grew up in a Mormon household, first in San Antonio, Texas, before moving to Salinas, California.

Growing up in his family's Mormon culture and living on military bases, Black worried about his sexuality. When he found himself attracted to a boy in his neighborhood at the age of six or seven, he told himself "I'm going to hell. And if I ever admit it, I'll be hurt, and I'll be brought down". He says that his "acute awareness" of his sexuality made him shy and at times suicidal. He came out in his senior year of college.

While attending North Salinas High School, Black began to work in theater at The Western Stage in Salinas and later worked on productions including Bare at Hollywood's Hudson Main Stage Theater. Black graduated from Pasadena City College in 1994 before transferring to University of California, Los Angeles, School of Theater, Film, and Television (UCLA) while apprenticing with stage directors, taking acting jobs, and working on theater lighting crews. He graduated with honors in 1996.

== Career ==
In 2000, Black wrote and directed The Journey of Jared Price, a gay romance film, and Something Close to Heaven, a gay coming-of-age short film. In 2001, he directed and was a subject in the documentary On the Bus about a Nevada road trip and adventure at Burning Man taken by six gay men. Raised as Mormon, he was hired as the only such writer on the HBO drama series Big Love about a polygamous family. He served on season one as a staff writer, executive story editor in season two, and was promoted again, to co-producer, for season three.

Black first visited San Francisco in the early 1990s, while AIDS was devastating the city's gay community. Black said that, "Hearing about Harvey was about the only hopeful story there was at the time." Researching Milk's life for three years, Black met with Milk's former aides Cleve Jones and Anne Kronenberg, as well as former San Francisco Mayor Art Agnos, and began to write a feature film screenplay encompassing the events of Milk's life. The screenplay was written on spec, but Black shared it with Gus Van Sant, who signed on to direct the feature.

Black's film Pedro, profiling the life of AIDS activist and reality television personality Pedro Zamora, premiered at the 2008 Toronto International Film Festival and was nominated for a WGA award.

On February 22, 2009, Black won the Oscar for Best Original Screenplay for Milk at the 81st Academy Awards. He wore a White Knot to the ceremony as a symbol of solidarity with the marriage equality movement.

On October 11, 2009, Black marched in the National Equality March and delivered a speech in front of the United States Capitol to an estimated crowd of 200,000 LGBT rights activists.

In 2010, Black directed his own script Virginia, starring Jennifer Connelly.

Also in 2010, Black narrated 8: The Mormon Proposition, a documentary about the involvement of the Church of Jesus Christ of Latter-day Saints (LDS) in California's Proposition 8. Black accepted the award for best documentary for 8: The Mormon Proposition at the GLAAD Media awards in San Francisco and spoke out on discrimination in the LDS Church and meeting with the church to make it more LGBT-inclusive.

Black wrote the screenplay for J. Edgar, a biographical drama released November 11, 2011, directed by Clint Eastwood and starring Leonardo DiCaprio.

In 2011, Black wrote the play 8, which portrays the actual events in the Hollingsworth v. Perry trial and the testimony which led to the overturn of California's Proposition 8. He created the play in response to the federal court's refusal to allow release of video recordings from the trial and to give the public a true account of what transpired in the courtroom. It is written and performed using original transcripts from the trial and journalist records, along with first-hand interviews of the people involved. 8 first opened at the Eugene O'Neill Theatre in New York City on September 19, 2011, and later broadcast to a worldwide audience on YouTube from the Ebell of Los Angeles Theatre on March 3, 2012.

The American Foundation for Equal Rights (AFER) and Broadway Impact, sponsors of 8, have released and licensed the play for readings nationwide on college campuses and in community theaters free of charge.

Black published his autobiography Mama's Boy: A Story From Our Americas in 2019. The book was later adapted into a feature documentary by award-winning documentarian Laurent Bouzereau with Amblin Entertainment and Playtone producing. It was distributed by HBOmax in 2022.

From 2007 to 2011, Gus Van Sant was set to direct a film adaptation of Tom Wolfe's book The Electric Kool-Aid Acid Test, for a time working with Black.

== Personal life ==
Black was the top entry on a list of openly gay influential people in The Advocate's "Forty under 40" issue of June/July 2009 and was featured on the cover of the magazine. He was one of the Official Grand Marshals in the 2009 NYC LGBT Pride March, produced by Heritage of Pride joining Anne Kronenberg and Cleve Jones.

Black's brother, Marcus, died of cancer in January 2012.

Black started a relationship with the British Olympic and World champion diver Tom Daley in spring 2013. The couple lived in the London Borough of Southwark but moved to Los Angeles in 2024. They were engaged in October 2015 and married at Bovey Castle in Devon in May 2017.

In February 2018, Black and Daley announced they were expecting their first child and subsequently announced the birth of a son by surrogacy in June 2018. Facing criticism for their choice of surrogacy, Black and Daley started a podcast in which they discussed the ethical issues surrounding surrogacy and the experience as a whole. The podcast was awarded Best Family Podcast at the British Podcast Awards in 2019. The couple do not share pictures of their child's face online due to privacy concerns. Daley said, "That might change in the future, but for right now, we wanted to enjoy the first year with him." Daley and Black's second son was born in March 2023.

In 2014, Black was one of eight potential commencement speakers invited by Pasadena City College, and he accepted. After a conservative school official learned private pictures of Black and his boyfriend were illegally leaked online five years prior, the official rescinded Black's invitation claiming it was "an honest error". After public outcry, and talks between attorneys for Black and PCC, the college board of trustees apologized and formally re-invited him.

In 2023, Black was assaulted in a London bar by a stranger leading to a concussion that left him unable to work for two years. In response to Black pressing charges, the accused filed a counterclaim, and Black was wrongly charged by the CPS with an assault. The case was thrown out by the presiding judge before a defence had begun due to inconsistencies and weakness in evidence from the accuser. The attacker received a legal caution. Due to this “malicious prosecution”, Black and Daley moved their family out of the United Kingdom, saying “I hope I never experience injustice that deep and damaging again in my life.”

In 2023, Black's portrait was added to the Smithsonian National Portrait Gallery's "The Struggle for Justice" exhibition in Washington, D.C., which honors major cultural and political leaders who have fought for civil rights, with Black recognized for his work and activism.

== Filmography ==
Year	Title	Role	Notes
2000	Something Close to Heaven	Writer–director	Short film
2000	The Journey of Jared Price	Writer–director	
2001	On the Bus	Director, producer, editor, cinematographer	Documentary
2003	Faking It USA	Director Producer (4 episodes): "Toolbelt to Toile"; "Polo to Wrangler"; "Six Pack to Chardonnay"; "Drag Racer to Drag Queen"	
2003	My Life with Count Dracula	Director, producer and editor	Documentary; The President's Memorial Award
2003	Kiss and Tell	Editor	Short film
2003	The Singing Forest	Editor and actor	as Bill
2004	Faking It (UK series)	Director (1 episode): "Sheep Shearer to Hair Stylist"	
2006–2009	Big Love	As writer (5 episodes): "The Baptism" (1x10); "Reunion" (2x03); "Kingdom Come" (2x08); "Oh, Pioneers" (2x12); "Empire" (3x02; story and screenplay); As co-producer (5 episodes): "Block Party" (3x01); "Empire" (3x02); "Prom Queen" (3x03); "On Trial" (3x04); "For Better or Worse" (3x05)	
2008	Pedro	Story and screenplay	Nominated–Writers Guild of America Award for Television Long Form – Original; Nominated–Humanitas Prize for 90 Minute Category
2008	Milk	Writer	Academy Award for Best Original Screenplay; Boston Society of Film Critics Award for Best Screenplay; Dallas-Fort Worth Film Critics Association Award for Best Screenplay; Independent Spirit Award for Best First Screenplay; San Francisco Film Critics Circle Award for Best Original Screenplay; Writers Guild of America Award for Best Original Screenplay; Hollywood Film Festival for Screenwriter of the Year; PEN Center USA Literary Award for Screenplay; Nominated–BAFTA Award for Best Original Screenplay; Nominated–Broadcast Film Critics Association Award for Best Writer; Nominated–Chicago Film Critics Association Award for Best Original Screenplay; Nominated–Online Film Critics Society Award for Best Original Screenplay; Nominated–Satellite Award for Best Original Screenplay; Nominated–Humanitas Prize for Feature Film Category
2010	Virginia	Writer–director	
2011	8	Writer	
2011	J. Edgar	Writer	
2015	"Songs I Can't Listen To" by Neon Trees	Actor	Music video
2017	When We Rise	Creator, writer, producer Director (2 episodes)	Miniseries about the LGBT civil rights movement in the United States Winner - GLAAD Award for Outstanding Limited series. Winner - Palm Springs Film Festival Audience Award
2022	Under the Banner of Heaven	Creator and executive producer Director (1 episode): "One Mighty and Strong"; Writer (4 episodes): "When God Was Love"; "Rightful Place"; "Surrender"; "Blood Atonement"	Crime drama television miniseries
2023	Rustin	Writer and executive producer	

== Other awards ==
- Cinema for Peace Award for Most Valuable Movie of The Year 2009
- UCLA's Distinguished Achievement in Screenwriting award, "UCLA Festival 2009: New Creative Work," School of Theater, Film and Television, June 10, 2009, Freud Playhouse
- Distinguished Service to the LGBT Community by a UCLA Alumnus Award, 2009 UCLA LGBT Graduation Ceremony, June 13, 2009
- Bonham Centre Award, for contribution to awareness and education around issues of sexual diversity, Media.utoronto.ca, The Mark S. Bonham Centre for Sexual Diversity Studies, University of Toronto, September 27, 2011
- Human Rights Campaign, Visibility Award September 15, 2012
- Equality Arizona, The Barry Goldwater Human Rights Individual Award Sept. 2013
- Writers Guild of America West, 2018 Valentine Davies Award for Civil and Human Rights Efforts, February 11, 2018

== Bibliography ==
- Black, Dustin Lance (2019). Mama's Boy: A Story from Our Americas. London: John Murray. ISBN 978-1-473-66544-6.
