= Circle the Wagons (Big Love) =

- Big Love episode
- Episode no.: Season 2 Episode 9
- Directed by: John Strickland
- Story by: Jennifer Schuur; Doug Stockstill
- Teleplay by: Doug Jung
- Cinematography by: William H. Wages
- Editing by: Byron Smith; Meg Reticker
- Original release date: August 6, 2007
- Running time: 55 minutes

Guest appearances
- Mary Kay Place as Adaleen Grant; John Carroll Lynch as Chuck Tuttle; Anne Dudek as Lura Grant; Mireille Enos as Kathy Marquart; Aaron Paul as Scott Quittman; Wendy Phillips as Peg Embry; Teddy Sears as Greg Samuelson

Episode chronology
← Previous "Kingdom Come"	Next → "The Happiest Girl"

"Circle the Wagons" is the ninth episode of the second season of the American drama television series Big Love. It is the 21st overall episode of the series and was written by producer Doug Jung from a story by Jennifer Schuur and Doug Stockstill, and directed by John Strickland. It originally aired on HBO on August 6, 2007.

The series is set in Salt Lake City and follows Bill Henrickson, a fundamentalist Mormon. He practices polygamy, having Barbara, Nicki and Margie as his wives. The series charts the family's life in and out of the public sphere in their suburb, as well as their associations with a fundamentalist compound in the area. In the episode, Bill tries to convince his wives in his future with Weber Gaming, while UEB considers replacing Roman.

The episode received positive reviews from critics, with particular praise towards Chloë Sevigny's performance.

== Plot ==
Bill (Bill Paxton) tells Nicki (Chloë Sevigny) of his Weber Gaming plans. While she supports his decision, Bill is worried that Barbara (Jeanne Tripplehorn) and Margie (Ginnifer Goodwin) might not support it, so Nicki decides to convince them. Nicki also visits Juniper Creek to reconcile with Adaleen (Mary Kay Place), but her mother refuses to acknowledge her.

With Roman (Harry Dean Stanton) in the hospital, Bill decides to get a replacement at UEB, upsetting Alby (Matt Ross). At Home Plus, Margie runs into her ex Greg (Teddy Sears) and they exchange a conversation. Ben (Douglas Smith) arrives with Greg, and when he makes a nasty comment about Margie, Ben assaults him. Lois (Grace Zabriskie) calls Bill to ask for financial support, but he refuses to lend her money. She then visits Sarah (Amanda Seyfried) and pretends that Frank is avoiding her for unknown reasons, and Scott (Aaron Paul) suggests suing him as she is entitled to his money.

During dinner, Barbara and Margie discover that Bill already bought the Weber Gaming venture, upsetting them as he did not consider them first. To convince them, he takes them to a casino to understand his decision, but Barbara is still not convinced. Margie once again visits Home Plus, and Ben lies by telling her that Bill does not want her to visit anymore. This helps Barbara's case into not giving into Bill's actions. Bill is forced to go to Juniper Creek when Lois is arrested for breaking into Frank's house, and his mother accuses him of conspiring with Frank in their business. Bill also attends the UEB meeting, where he is dismayed to see that Alby has successfully convinced the members in temporarily replacing Roman. During this, Nicki steals money from Roman's office. Back home, the Henricksons finally vote and to Barbara's surprise, Margie supports Bill and Nicki in the decision. After learning that Ben lied to Margie, Bill decides to transfer Greg to avoid more conflicts. Nicki is seen taking the money to the casino, playing bingo.

== Production ==
=== Development ===
The episode was written by producer Doug Jung from a story by Jennifer Schuur and Doug Stockstill, and directed by John Strickland. This was Jung's second writing credit, Schuur's first writing credit, Stockstill's first writing credit, and Strickland's first directing credit.

== Reception ==
=== Critical reviews ===
"Circle the Wagons" received positive reviews from critics. Trish Wethman of TV Guide wrote, "It is becoming increasingly evident that juggling his businesses and the pressures of the UEB is nothing compared to the strain Bill faces when it comes to coping with his three wives."

Emily Nussbaum of Vulture wrote, "as usual, we're all about the Chloë Sevigny, whether she's running over a fuel-efficient freezer with a look of grief-stricken rage, snakily negotiating with her viperish brother, or simply screaming "bingo!" with her eyes spinning like pinwheels. In any case, someone give this woman an Emmy. She's Carmela Soprano in the body of Patient Griselda."

Emily St. James of Slant Magazine wrote, "After last week's generally excellent “Kingdom Come”, Big Love retreats to its Juniper Creek storyline in “Circle Your Wagons”. This is probably the most interesting that Juniper Creek has been in a good long time, but it is still grating and rather boring to have to go to the compound for lots of backstabbing and squabbling politics when our hearts and interest lie with Bill Henrickson and his increasingly unruly wives. Unfortunately, the Henrickson storylines are also lacking, and the episode ends up being one of the more lackluster ones in the otherwise sterling second season." Shirley Halperin of Entertainment Weekly wrote, "the fact that I can get sucked into Bill's latest destined-for-failure venture or his "right" to live "the principle" speaks volumes about this show's knack for nuanced characters and constantly evolving story lines. It's what makes Big Love so special."

Jen Creer of TV Squad wrote, "Things are certainly heating up on Big Love. I don't know for certain what big finale we are gearing up for. I used to think that it was Bill taking over as head of the U.E.B. (United Effort Brotherhood). I thought last season was leading Bill toward being the prophet. But now I'm not so sure. Now, more and more, I think things are careening toward Bill losing everything. I don't think he'll lose the store (though, that would make Margie's concerns foreshadowing), but I think he is going to lose Barb. And that, in Bill's world, would be everything." Television Without Pity gave the episode a "C+" grade.

Matt Ross submitted this episode for consideration for Outstanding Supporting Actor in a Drama Series at the 60th Primetime Emmy Awards.
