= The Happiest Girl (Big Love) =

- Big Love episode
- Episode no.: Season 2 Episode 10
- Directed by: Tom Vaughan
- Story by: Doug Stockstill; Jennifer Schuur
- Teleplay by: Jeanette Collins; Mimi Friedman; Mark V. Olsen; Will Scheffer
- Cinematography by: M. David Mullen
- Editing by: Byron Smith
- Original release date: August 13, 2007
- Running time: 47 minutes

Guest appearances
- Bruce Dern as Frank Harlow; Mary Kay Place as Adaleen Grant; Tina Majorino as Heather Tuttle; Matt McCoy as Dick Paulson; Robin Riker as Meredith Paulson; Margaret Easley as April Blessing; Mireille Enos as Kathy Marquart; Meagen Fay as Laura Tuttle; Peter Dobson as Bill's Business Partner; Anne Dudek as Lura Grant; Eric Pierpoint as Larry Schoenfeld; Michael McGrady as Peter; J. Karen Thomas as Nurse

Episode chronology
← Previous "Circle the Wagons"	Next → "Take Me As I Am"

"The Happiest Girl" is the tenth episode of the second season of the American drama television series Big Love. It is the 22nd overall episode of the series and was written by supervising producers Jeanette Collins and Mimi Friedman and series creators Mark V. Olsen and Will Scheffer from a story by Doug Stockstill and Jennifer Schuur, and directed by Tom Vaughan. It originally aired on HBO on August 13, 2007.

The series is set in Salt Lake City and follows Bill Henrickson, a fundamentalist Mormon. He practices polygamy, having Barbara, Nicki and Margie as his wives. The series charts the family's life in and out of the public sphere in their suburb, as well as their associations with a fundamentalist compound in the area. In the episode, Bill takes Margie for a business trip in Nevada, while Nicki tries to throw a party for Joey and Kathy.

The episode received positive reviews from critics, who praised the performances and character development, although the Juniper Creek subplot received a mixed response.

== Plot ==
As Adaleen (Mary Kay Place) and Alby (Matt Ross) investigate the money robbery at the UEB office, they are informed that Roman (Harry Dean Stanton) is improving and they decide to take him home. Bill (Bill Paxton) is leaving for a Weber Gaming convention in Nevada, and offers Barbara (Jeanne Tripplehorn) to accompany him but she declines. When Nicki (Chloë Sevigny) also expresses disinterest, Margie (Ginnifer Goodwin) decides to go with Bill.

Frank (Bruce Dern) visits Lois (Grace Zabriskie) to show his new car, only to be served with the divorce papers and Lois' entitlement to half his earnings. Convinced that Bill is involved, he decides to spy on him for Alby. In Nevada, Bill and Margie publicly endorse their married status, and Bill even decides to get themselves the honeymoon suite. They run into Dick (Matt McCoy) and Meredith Paulson (Robin Riker), old friends of Bill. Margie feels insulted when Bill introduces her as his secretary. Bill asks Barbara for help and she reluctantly visits, believing that she is vouching for him with the Paulsons. Finding that Margie is sad that she never go to fully experience her honeymoon, Barbara decides to kick Bill out of the suite. Nicki is scheduling a party commemorate Joey (Shawn Doyle) and Kathy (Mireille Enos) on their wedding, but Alby refuses to let her enter Juniper Creek and host it in the compound, forcing her to move it to her house.

Rhonda (Daveigh Chase) tries to force Sarah (Amanda Seyfried) and Heather (Tina Majorino) to attend her support group, but they do not want to deal with her anymore. When Heather's mother scolds them for not supporting her, Sarah reluctanly agrees to visit her. In Nevada, Bill and Barbara dine with the Paulsons, but Margie ruins the evening by introducing herself as Bill's mistress. This prompts Bill to finally reveal he has three wives, winning over his partners. This delights Margie, who suggests being Bill's "wife" for Weber Gaming. At Joey's party, Alby shows up and accuses Nicki of stealing Roman's money. When Nicki claims they are now involved in gambling, Alby leaves after realizing it was Weber Gaming. At home, a bed-ridden Roman sees Rhonda singing on television.

== Production ==
=== Development ===
The episode was written by supervising producers Jeanette Collins and Mimi Friedman and series creators Mark V. Olsen and Will Scheffer from a story by Jennifer Schuur and Doug Stockstill, and directed by Tom Vaughan. This was Collins' fourth writing credit, Friedman's fourth writing credit, Olsen's 12th writing credit, Scheffer's 12th writing credit, Schuur's second writing credit, Stockstill's second writing credit, and Vaughan's first directing credit.

== Reception ==
=== Critical reviews ===
"The Happiest Girl" received positive reviews from critics. Trish Wethman of TV Guide wrote, "There wasn't a ton of action in tonight's episode, but there's lots going on just below the surface as we prepare for the final two episodes of what has been an amazing ride this summer. This is one weekly fix that I am going to sorely miss as we enter the madness of the fall television season. It'll be a long 10 months until our favorite polygamists return to the rotation."

Alan Sepinwall wrote, "I understand that the contrast between the Henricksons' assimilated life and life back on the compound is an integral part of the show, but it feels like they play the same notes over and over. I'm not sad to see Roman go (if indeed he's going), but the petty Alby's not much of an improvement. More interaction between the wives and less of Alby and Rhonda ruining other people's lives just because they can, please." Emily Nussbaum of Vulture wrote, "In this fantastic episode, Bill Hendrickson sends each sister-wife into a wormhole of insecurity: Barb because she doesn't want to be his arm-candy at a gambling conference, Margene because she does (but only as his public wife), and Niki because she knows he doesn't want her to."

Emily St. James of Slant Magazine wrote, "At the end of “The Happiest Girl,” the tenth episode of Big Love's second season, Rhonda Volmer sings the titular song, leading into a montage that is slightly too obvious; throughout the hour, every woman on the show has had her happiness undermined except for the ever-oblivious Rhonda. But Chase's sad performance and the song’s untapped irony manages to put the sequence over, completing an episode that is a welcome return to form." Shirley Halperin of Entertainment Weekly wrote, "At the beginning of this season, who would've thought we'd see the shunned and belittled son of Roman Grant take the reigns [sic] of the UEB? And do it so effortlessly. But so it was that Alby peered into his father's hat and came out an acting prophet. How long that situation will stay temporary remains to be seen, but we did learn quite a bit about the way Alby likes to do business — with a heavy hand."

Jen Creer of TV Squad wrote, "I'm going to go out on a limb here and argue that Bill has essentially not changed since the beginning of the show. Oh, sure, he is still acting and behaving - but I don't think there is anything inherently different about the way he is behaving. He is still ambitious, still thinks he is right, and he is a salesman: He thinks he can talk his way into or out of any situation. However, I bet that was cold comfort at the end of tonight's episode, considering who he ended up in bed with." Television Without Pity gave the episode a "C+" grade.

Ginnifer Goodwin submitted this episode for consideration for Outstanding Lead Actress in a Drama Series at the 60th Primetime Emmy Awards.
