= Take Me as I Am (Big Love) =

- Big Love episode
- Episode no.: Season 2 Episode 11
- Directed by: Jim McKay
- Written by: Eileen Myers
- Cinematography by: William H. Wages
- Editing by: Byron Smith; Meg Reticker
- Original release date: August 19, 2007
- Running time: 49 minutes

Guest appearances
- Ellen Burstyn as Nancy Dutton; Philip Baker Hall as Ned Johanssen; Luke Askew as Hollis Green; Judith Hoag as Cindy Dutton; Aaron Paul as Scott Quittman; Anne Dudek as Lura Grant; Mireille Enos as Kathy Marquart; Audrey Wasilewski as Pam Martin

Episode chronology
| ← Previous "The Happiest Girl" | Next → "Oh, Pioneers" |

"Take Me As I Am" is the eleventh episode of the second season of the American drama television series Big Love. It is the 23rd overall episode of the series and was written by Eileen Myers, and directed by Jim McKay. It originally aired on HBO on August 19, 2007.

The series is set in Salt Lake City and follows Bill Henrickson, a fundamentalist Mormon. He practices polygamy, having Barbara, Nicki and Margie as his wives. The series charts the family's life in and out of the public sphere in their suburb, as well as their associations with a fundamentalist compound in the area. In the episode, Barbara tries to reconcile with her mother, while Bill faces consequences after Alby discovers his Weber Gaming venture.

According to Nielsen Media Research, the episode was seen by an estimated 2.34 million household viewers and gained a 1.1/3 ratings share among adults aged 18–49. The episode received extremely positive reviews from critics, with major praise towards Burstyn's performance. For the episode, Ellen Burstyn received a nomination for Outstanding Guest Actress in a Drama Series at the 60th Primetime Emmy Awards.

== Plot ==
Barbara (Jeanne Tripplehorn) discovers that her mother, Nancy (Ellen Burstyn), just got engaged to a man named Ned Johanssen. Bill (Bill Paxton) confronts Nicki (Chloë Sevigny) over throwing a party at his house, and is upset when he finds that Alby (Matt Ross) knows about his Weber Gaming venture. He visits Alby, offering his place at the council if he lets Joey (Shawn Doyle) marry Kathy (Mireille Enos).

Pam (Audrey Wasilewski) offers $50,000 to Margie (Ginnifer Goodwin) to act as a surrogate mother for her, and Margie is seriously considering the offer. Alby threatens Nicki into making Bill return Weber Gaming, revealing that he stole it from Roman (Harry Dean Stanton). After failing to persuade Bill in reconsidering his venture, Nicki tells Barbara that she wants to change her vote in the decision. Barbara visits Nancy, but she refuses to meet her due to her polygamy's history. When Barbara mentions that Ben (Douglas Smith) is considering polygamy after starting to date twins, Nancy agrees in letting Ben attend her wedding and make him stay for the summer. Feeling threatened by Alby's presence, Joey gets Kathy and Wanda (Melora Walters) out of their house before he arrives.

Sarah (Amanda Seyfried) and Scott (Aaron Paul) start experiencing problems in their relationship, and Sarah turns to Barbara and Bill for advice. Bill personally talks with Scott, and Scott decides to break up with Sarah, but she is not ready to leave their relationship behind. Barbara takes Ben to Nancy's wedding, but upon discovering her plan, Ben calls Bill for help. Bill arrives, and gets into an argument with Barbara over not fully disclosing the details of Weber Gaming's plan. He returns home, where he is threatened with retaliation by Alby. Bill goes to the wedding again, where he dances with Sarah. Nicki and Margie arrive at the wedding, and the marriage gets into a heated argument. As Nancy is leaving, Barbara hopes they can reconcile again. At home, Barbara notices something in her bed. When she opens the sheets, she is horrified to discover snakes.

== Production ==
=== Development ===
The episode was written by Eileen Myers, and directed by Jim McKay. This was Myers' fourth writing credit, and McKay's second directing credit.

== Reception ==
=== Viewers ===
In its original American broadcast, "Take Me As I Am" was seen by an estimated 2.34 million household viewers with a 1.1/3 in the 18–49 demographics. This means that 1.1 percent of all households with televisions watched the episode, while 3 percent of all of those watching television at the time of the broadcast watched it.

=== Critical reviews ===
"Take Me As I Am" received extremely positive reviews from critics. Trish Wethman of TV Guide wrote, "These final episodes seem to be building to a final showdown between Bill, Alby and the Greenes, with Roman's life hanging in the balance. However, for me, the bigger battle is heating up right in that gigantic backyard that links the Henricksons' homes and lives."

Alan Sepinwall wrote, "As I've said before, I find Alby and the rest of the Juniper Creek crew too cartoonish and two-dimensional to make interesting villains, and as with my hopes that Vince and E might lose on occasion are pointless, so too is my hope that this show might ever leave those characters far behind. It is what the show is, unfortunately for me. But stories like last night's wedding scandal are, too, and they're the reason I stick around." Emily Nussbaum of Vulture wrote, "speaking of infestations, for our finale, Alby (we're assuming) provides the ol' rattlesnake in the connubial bed trick! Delicious: It's a metaphor wrapped in a Godfather reference wrapped in a duvet."

Emily St. James of Slant Magazine wrote, "After the end of the penultimate episode of Big Love’s second season, “Take Me As I Am,” I thought the episode's final shots, showing a knot of rattlesnakes lying beneath the covers of a perfectly made bed, was a little over-the-top as a symbol. But as I thought about it more, I realized the snakes are the perfect representation of every part of the Henrickson family’s life." Shirley Halperin of Entertainment Weekly wrote, "It had so much intensity and forward movement, and, at the same time, offered a real look at how the Henricksons — in particular, Barb — got into their situation. Plus, we got the phenomenal Ellen Burstyn, who was perfectly cast as Barb's mom."

Jen Creer of TV Squad wrote, "This was another great episode in a solid season of Big Love. Again, every line, every nuance is so charged, it is hard to unravel it all." Television Without Pity gave the episode a "B" grade.

Jeanne Tripplehorn submitted this episode for consideration for Outstanding Lead Actress in a Drama Series, while Ellen Burstyn submitted it for Outstanding Guest Actress in a Drama Series at the 60th Primetime Emmy Awards. Burstyn would receive a nomination, but would lose to Cynthia Nixon for Law & Order: Special Victims Unit.
