= Ilan Meyer =

American psychiatric epidemologist (born 1956)

Ilan H. Meyer
- אילן מאיר
- Born: January 26, 1956 (age 70); Tel Aviv, Israel
- Education: Columbia University (Ph.D) 1993; The New School for Social Research (M.A.) 1987; Tel Aviv University (B.A.) 1981
- Occupations: Researcher, professor

Ilan H. Meyer (Hebrew: אילן מאיר; born January 26, 1956) is an American psychiatric epidemiologist, author, professor, and a senior scholar for public policy and sexual orientation law at the Williams Institute of UCLA. He has conducted extensive research on minority identities related to sexual orientation, gender, race and ethnicity, drawing conclusions on the impact of social stresses on their mental health. Meyer was an expert witness for the plaintiffs in Perry v. Schwarzenegger (2010), the federal case that overturned California Proposition 8.

== Career ==
Meyer holds a Ph.D. in Sociomedical Sciences/Social Psychology from Columbia University Mailman School of Public Health. He received his Master's from the New School for Social Research and his B.A. from Tel Aviv University. He completed postdoctoral fellowships in Health Psychology at the Graduate Center at CUNY and as a NIMH Research Fellow in Psychiatry (HIV/AIDS) at the Memorial Sloan-Kettering Cancer Center.

Meyer's academic background is in social psychology, psychiatric epidemiology, and sociomedical sciences. For over a decade, he has focused specifically on the study of public health issues related to minority health. His areas of research include stress and illness in minority populations, in particular, the relationship of minority status, minority identity, prejudice and discrimination and mental health outcomes in sexual minorities and the intersection of minority stressors related to sexual orientation, race, ethnicity and gender.

Meyer developed a model of that describes the relationship of social stressors and mental disorders and helps to explain LGBT health disparities. The model has guided his and other investigators’ population research on LGBT health disparities by identifying the mechanisms by which social stressors impact health and describing the harm to LGBT people from prejudice and stigma. The Institute of Medicine (IOM) cited the model as one of four cross-cutting perspectives (the only one stemming from LGBT scholarship) recommended for the study of LGBT health.

For this work, Meyer received the Outstanding Achievement Award from the Committee on Lesbian, Gay, Bisexual, and Transgender Concerns of the American Psychological Association (APA) and Distinguished Scientific Contribution award from the APA's Division 44. Based on his body of work, Meyer provided expert testimony related to same-sex marriage in Perry v. Schwarzenegger, and to peer-to-peer violence and bullying before the U.S. Commission on Civil Rights.

== Publications ==
Meyer has authored or co-authored over 50 peer-reviewed articles and numerous other publications and conference abstracts, co-edited one book, and is in the process of writing another book. In 2001, he edited the first special issue on LGBT health in The American Journal of Public Health. Meyer is co-editor with Mary E. Northridge of The Health of Sexual Minorities: Public health perspectives on lesbian, gay, bisexual and transgender populations (Springer, 2007). The text offers a multidimensional picture of LGBT health, incorporating contributions from across clinical and social science disciplines.

Some of his notable publications include:

- Meyer, I.H., Schwartz, S., & Frost, D. M. (2008). "Social patterning of stress and coping: Does disadvantaged social status confer more stress and fewer coping resources?" Social Science & Medicine
- Meyer, I.H., Dietrich, J.D., & Schwartz, S. (2008). "Lifetime prevalence of mental disorders and suicide attempts in diverse lesbian, gay, and bisexual populations." American Journal of Public Health
- Meyer, I.H. & Northridge, M.E. (2007). "The Health of Sexual Minorities: Public Health Perspectives on Lesbian, Gay, Bisexual and Transgender Populations" Springer, NY.
- Meyer, I.H. (2003). "Prejudice as stress: Conceptual Problems for Measurement." American Journal of Public Health 93; 262–265.
- Meyer, I.H. (2003). "Prejudice, social stress and mental health in lesbian, gay, and bisexual populations: Conceptual issues and research evidence." Psychological Bulletin 129; 674–697.
- Meyer I.H. "Prejudice as stress: conceptual problems for measurement" (2003). American Journal of Public Health 93; 262–265.
- Meyer I.H., Whyatt RM, Perera FP, Ford JG (2003). "Risk for asthma in 1-year old infants residing in New York City high-risk neighborhoods" Journal of Asthma 40; 545–550.
- Meyer I.H., Rossano L, Ellis J, Bradford J (2002). "A brief telephone interview to identify lesbian and bisexual women in random digit dialing sampling" Journal of Sex Research 39; 139–144.
- Meyer I.H. (2001). "Why lesbian, gay, bisexual, and transgender public health?" American Journal of Public Health 91; 856–859.
- Lewin S, Meyer I.H. (2001). "Torture, ill-treatment and sexual identity" The Lancet 358 Dec 1 1899–1900.
- Meyer I.H., Schwartz S (2000). "Social issues as public health: promise and peril" American Journal of Public Health 90; 1189–1191.
- Meyer I.H., Dean L (1998) "Internalized homophobia, intimacy, and sexual behavior among gay and bisexual men" Stigma and sexual orientation: Understanding prejudice against lesbians, gay men, and bisexuals Ed. Herek GM Sage, CA. 160–186.
- Meyer I.H. (1995) "Minority stress and mental health in gay men" Journal of Health and Social Behavior 36; 38–56.

== Awards ==
- Distinguished Dissertation - Columbia University Graduate School of Arts and Sciences
- Barbara Snell Dohrenwend Award for published/publishable paper
- Marisa De Castro Benton Dissertation Award for outstanding contribution to the sociomedical sciences - Columbia University
- Mark Freedman Award for outstanding research on lesbian/gay issues - Association of Lesbian & Gay Psychologists
- Distinguished Scientific Contribution, American Psychological Association Division 44 - Gay, Lesbian, and Bisexual Issues
- Outstanding Achievement Award Committee on Lesbian, Gay, Bisexual, and Transgender Concerns of the American Psychological Association

== Perry trial testimony ==
In 2010, Meyer was an expert witness in the Perry v. Schwarzenegger trial, testifying on the mental health impact on gay couples denied the right to marry. His testimony relied on empirical studies showing that gays and lesbians encounter a disproportionate level of stress and mental health difficulties because of discrimination, and that these stresses amplify the social stigma that makes them more susceptible to depression, suicide and substance abuse. When asked if mental health outcomes for gays and lesbians in California would improve if Proposition 8 were not law, Meyer said, in the affirmative, that "when people are exposed to more stress...they are more likely to get sick, consistent with a law that says to gay people you are not welcome here, your relationships are not valued"; laws such as Proposition 8, he said, "[have] significant power."

== See also ==
- LGBT people in science
