= Mazÿck P. Ravenel =

American bacteriologist and academic (1862–1946)

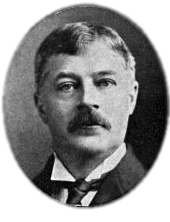

Mazÿck Porcher Ravenel (1862–1946), was an American professor of preventive medicine at the University of Missouri, reaching the peak of his career by 1921. He was president of the American Public Health Association. In 1901, he was a member of the American Philosophical Society. He was the recipient of an honorary membership in Delta Omega, an international public health honor society.

== Selected publications ==
- A half century of public health: jubilee historical volume of the American Public Health Association, in commemoration of the fiftieth anniversary celebration of its foundation. New York: American Public Health Association (1921) ISBN 978-5519143332
