= Mary Northridge =

American epidemiologist

Mary Evelyn Northridge
- Citizenship: United States
- Known for: Editor-in-chief of American Journal of Public Health (2001-2015)
- Scientific career
- Fields: epidemiology
- Workplaces: NYU

Mary Evelyn Northridge is an American epidemiologist and the former editor-in-chief of the American Journal of Public Health (2001–2015). She was the journal's first female editor-in-chief. Northridge obtained a BA at University of Virginia (chemistry, 1980), an MPH at Rutgers University (environmental health, 1988), and a PhD at Columbia University (epidemiology, 1993).
