= Block Party (Big Love) =

- Big Love episode
- Episode no.: Season 3 Episode 1
- Directed by: Dan Attias
- Written by: Mark V. Olsen; Will Scheffer
- Cinematography by: Anette Haellmigk
- Editing by: Byron Smith
- Original release date: January 18, 2009
- Running time: 56 minutes

Guest appearances
- Bruce Dern as Frank Harlow; Mary Kay Place as Adaleen Grant; Charles Esten as Ray Henry; Branka Katić as Ana Mesovich; Tina Majorino as Heather Tuttle; Anne Dudek as Lura Grant; Mark L. Young as Frankie; Robert Beltran as Jerry Flute; Carlos Jacott as Carl Martin; Kate Norby as Glory; Jenny O'Hara as Nita; Raphael Sbarge as Rob O'Hare; Noa Tishby as Ladonna; Jessica Tuck as Patty O'Hare; Audrey Wasilewski as Pam Martin; Jolean Wejbe as Tancy "Teenie" Henrickson

Episode chronology
← Previous "Oh, Pioneers"	Next → "Empire"

"Block Party" is the first episode of the third season of the American drama television series Big Love. It is the 25th overall episode of the series and was written by series creators Mark V. Olsen and Will Scheffer, and directed by Dan Attias. It originally aired on HBO on January 18, 2009.

The series is set in Salt Lake City and follows Bill Henrickson, a fundamentalist Mormon. He practices polygamy, having Barbara, Nicki and Margie as his wives. The series charts the family's life in and out of the public sphere in their suburb, as well as their associations with a fundamentalist compound in the area. In the episode, Bill tries to sign a new client, while Nicki tries to help Roman by working at the DA's office.

According to Nielsen Media Research, the episode was seen by an estimated 1.16 million household viewers and gained a 0.6 ratings share among adults aged 18–49. The episode received very positive reviews from critics, who praised the new storylines and performances.

== Plot ==
Bill (Bill Paxton) and Margie (Ginnifer Goodwin) have welcome their child, Nell. Nicki (Chloë Sevigny) is also starting a new job, unbeknownst to her family, at the DA's office to find any evidence against Roman (Harry Dean Stanton), who is facing rape charges. Nicki also faces backlash at her own block, as the neighbors are aware of her connection to Roman. Barbara (Jeanne Tripplehorn) believes her cervical cancer might be back, and starts getting tests.

Bill is still dating Ana (Branka Katić), despite knowing she does not plan to marry him. Bill and Don (Joel McKinnon Miller) are also trying to convince Jerry Flute (Robert Beltran), a Native American businessman, to partner in a Mormon-friendly casino outside the city. While Jerry is interested, he does not believe Bill has the experience to pull it off. At his car, Bill is surprised to find his half-brother Frankie (Mark L. Young), who has been kicked out of Juniper Creek by Frank (Bruce Dern). Bill takes Frankie with Frank, who has married Kathy's twin sister Jodean (Mireille Enos), but Frank refuses to let Frankie back. As they return to the city, Frankie flees from Bill's car. That night, Bill helps Nicki in cleaning her house when they find that some neighbors covered it in toilet papering. After learning of a potential fourth wife, Sarah (Amanda Seyfried) considers leaving Utah for college, disappointing Heather (Tina Majorino).

Alby (Matt Ross) meets up with a man to have sex at a bathroom, but the man suddenly attacks him and drowns him. Before he can finish the job, pedestrians enter, forcing the assailant to flee. He deduces Bill was responsible, but Nicki claims they were not involved. Nicki finds two key witnesses on Roman's case and informs Adaleen (Mary Kay Place), who does not feel bad for Alby's assault. Bill falls into temptation and has sex with Ana, prompting him to break up with her. Seeing that the neighbors now are ignoring the family, Bill decides to take his family to a block party, where he gets aggressive when a neighbor makes a poor comment on his family. However, they realize that no one knows about their lifestyle due to a simple misunderstanding. Nicki then proclaims herself as Roman's daughter and asks the neighbors to respect the Henricksons for their support. As the family reunites, Ana shows up, willing to accept everything to become Bill's fourth wife.

== Production ==
=== Development ===
The episode was written by series creators Mark V. Olsen and Will Scheffer, and directed by Dan Attias. This was Olsen's 14th writing credit, Scheffer's 14th writing credit, and Attias' second directing credit.

== Reception ==
=== Viewers ===
In its original American broadcast, "Block Party" was seen by an estimated 1.16 million household viewers with a 0.6 in the 18–49 demographics. This means that 0.6 percent of all households with televisions watched the episode. This was a massive 60% decrease in viewership from the previous episode, which was watched by an estimated 2.88 million household viewers with a 1.4 in the 18–49 demographics.

=== Critical reviews ===
"Block Party" received very positive reviews from critics. Amelie Gillette of The A.V. Club gave the episode an "A–" grade and wrote, "One of the reasons that the show holds such dramatic weight is that it allows us to peek over the fence(s) of a practicing polygamist family, and watch as they try to assimilate into the culture at large. But as Season Three begins, the dark side of polygamy casts a shadow over any sun-bleached suburban vision of "the principle" that the Hendricksons might have created."

Nick Catucci of Vulture wrote, "With this premiere, we dive deep into season three, and even deeper into this gender-polarized world, from Anna, whom “we want to formally date,” to matriarch Barb, secretly confronting cancer." Emily St. James of Slant Magazine wrote, "It isn't a perfect episode (it's not a perfect show), but it is a good one and a very entertaining one (which, again, would describe the show itself)."

Mark Blankenship of HuffPost gave the episode an "A–" grade and wrote, "The claustrophobia makes me deliciously uneasy. With all this energy in such a tiny space, something is going to blow. One of these closed-off communities will either open up or get totally decimated, or else the show's going to get so limited that it will get stale."
