= Sylva Kelegian =

Armenian-American actress (born 1962)

- Born: February 22, 1962 (age 64); New York City, New York, U.S.
- Occupation: Actress · author
- Years active: 1994–present
- Spouse: Jude Ciccolella (m. 1997)

Sylva Kelegian (born February 22, 1962) is an American actress.

== Career ==
She appeared in such television shows as Law & Order, Desperate Housewives, Invasion, Prison Break, ER, NYPD Blue, and Stephen King's Desperation. She also portrayed Ivy Starnes in Atlas Shrugged (2011), the film adaptation of Ayn Rand's novel of the same name.

== Personal life ==
Kelegian was born in New York City on February 22, 1962. She has been married to actor Jude Ciccolella since 1997.

== Filmography ==
=== Film ===
Year	Title	Role	Notes
1997	The Devil & the Angel	Denise Ventoula	
1999	Bringing Out the Dead	Crackhead	
1999	Sometime in August	Marcia	
2002	Spider-Man	Mother at Fire	
2004	Crash	Nurse Hodges	
2005	Coach Carter	Office Assistant	
2005	Going Shopping	Shopper	
2011	Atlas Shrugged: Part I	Ivy Starnes	
2014	Return to Zero	Annie	
2022	The Allnighter	Vicky	

=== Television ===
Year	Title	Role	Notes
1994	Babylon 5	Tech #2	Episode: "Infection"
1997, 1999	Law & Order	Margo Grayson / Sandra Lawlor	2 episodes
2000, 2003	NYPD Blue	Caroline Tytell / Margaret Custance	2 episodes
2001	Law & Order: Special Victims Unit	Lindsay Branson	Episode: "Victims"
2003	Mister Sterling	Stephanie Minkowski	Episode: "Human Error"
2003	Strong Medicine	Maggie	Episode: "Addicted to Love"
2003	The Guardian	Roz Kempf	Episode: "Hazel Park"
2004	Judging Amy	Marie Danaher	Episode: "Predictive Neglect"
2004	Without a Trace	Lauren Andrews-Dardis	Episode: "Lost and Found"
2005	Blind Justice	Meg Wheeler	Episode: "Dance with Me"
2006	Invasion	Lucy McKittrick	Episode: "All God's Creatures"
2006	Stephen King's Desperation	Ellie Carver	Television film
2006	Prison Break	Denise	Episode: "The Killing Box"
2007	Big Love	ATF Agent	2 episodes
2008	Desperate Housewives	Diane	Episode: "Welcome to Kanagawa"
2008	Bones	Rita Gratton	Episode: "The He in the She"
2009	Cold Case	Pam Byer	Episode: "Lotto Fever"
2009	ER	Donna	Episode: "A Long, Strange Trip"
2011	Rizzoli & Isles	Mrs. Randall	Episode: "Remember Me"
2012	Southland	Mike's Mom	Episode: "Legacy"
2013	NCIS: Los Angeles	Leah Dewhurst	Episode: "History"
2013	CSI: Crime Scene Investigation	Kim Ellis	Episode: "Torch Song"
2020	Boned	Heidi Nordic	Episode: "One"
