= Jennifer Schuur =

American television writer and producer

- Occupations: Television writer, television producer
- Writing career
- Notable works: Big Love; Hellcats; Hannibal

Jennifer Schuur is an American television writer and producer best known for her work on series such as Big Love and Hellcats. She served as a producer on the NBC psychological thriller Hannibal. In 2015, she created and produced season one of the legal drama series The Catch alongside Shonda Rhimes for ABC, but exited as show runner due to creative differences. More recently, she signed an overall deal with HBO.

== Television career ==
=== Big Love episodes ===
- 2.9 "Circle the Wagons" (story with Doug Stockstill)
- 2.10 "The Happiest Girl" (story with Doug Stockstill)

=== Crash episodes ===
- 2.6 "No Matter What You Do"
- 2.11 "Calm Like a Bomb"

=== Army Wives episodes ===
- 3.7 "Onward Christian Soldiers"
- 4.15 "Hearts & Minds"

=== Hellcats episodes ===
- 1.2 "I Say a Little Prayer" (teleplay with Kevin Murphy)
- 1.7 "The Match Game
- 1.12 "Papa, Oh Papa" (with Kevin Murphy)
- 1.18 "Woke Up Dead"

=== ‘’Unbelievable’’ episodes ===
- 1.5 “Episode 5”

In addition to the above, Schuur has also written singular episodes for the series Big Shots and Valentine. In 2013, Schuur's episode of Hannibal, entitled "Œuf", was pulled from broadcasting due to the episode's controversial content. A portion of the episode was edited into a series of webisodes and made available online.
