= Live Read =

- Show type: Staged reading
- Location: Bing Theater, LACMA; Los Angeles, Wallis Annenberg Center for the Performing Arts

Creative team
- Creator: Jason Reitman
- Director: Jason Reitman (2011-2016, 2018); Guest directors (2013-present)
- Host: Elvis Mitchell (2011-2019); Rachel Bleemer (2019-present)
- [www.filmindependent.org/blog/tag/live-reads/ Official website]

Live Read is a monthly live staged reading of a film script and a part of the Film Independent at LACMA film series at the Bing Theater directed by Jason Reitman and hosted by Elvis Mitchell from 2011 to 2016. In 2019, Film Independent brought the series back as part of Film Independent Presents... at the Wallis Annenberg Center for the Performing Arts, produced by director of programming and events, Rachel Bleemer. A guest director reads the stage directions in the scripts while images from the film would be projected behind the cast. The script is typically announced days before the event and while some actors were announced beforehand, full cast lists and the role each actor would play were kept secret until the event itself. The actors do not rehearse ahead of time.

The readings are one-night-only and are not recorded due to rights issues. Because of this, tickets for the 500 seats go on pre-sale to members of Film Independent one week ahead of the general public, and sell out almost immediately.

The series is to show audiences how actors create characters.

== Readings ==
Jason Reitman directs and reads the stage directions unless otherwise noted. Many of the actors play multiple supporting roles. Specific roles are stated only when information is known.

=== 2011 ===
==== October (The Breakfast Club) ====
The Breakfast Club by John Hughes

Cast

- Jennifer Garner as Claire (originally played by Molly Ringwald)
- James Van Der Beek as Andy (originally played by Emilio Estevez)
- Mindy Kaling as Allison (originally played by Ally Sheedy)
- Patton Oswalt as Brian (originally played by Anthony Michael Hall)
- Aaron Paul as Bender (originally played by Judd Nelson)
- Michael Chiklis as Mr. Vernon (originally played by Paul Gleason)
- J. K. Simmons as Carl the janitor (originally played by John Kapelos)

==== November (The Apartment) ====
The Apartment by Billy Wilder and I. A. L. Diamond

Cast

- Steve Carell as C.C. Baxter (originally played by Jack Lemmon)
- Natalie Portman as Fran Kubelik (originally played by Shirley MacLaine)
- Pierce Brosnan as Mr. Sheldrake (originally played by Fred MacMurray; J. K. Simmons was originally slated to play this role, couldn't attend the event)
- Ken Jeong as Mr. Dobisch (originally played by Ray Walston) and the Rickshaw restaurant waiter
- Jake Johnson as Dr. Dreyfuss (originally played by Jack Kruschen)
- Nick Kroll as Mr. Kirkeby (originally played by David Lewis)
- Collette Wolfe as Sylvia (originally played by Joan Shawlee)
- Mindy Kaling as Miss Olsen (originally played by Edie Adams)

==== December (The Princess Bride) ====
The Princess Bride by William Goldman, based on the novel by Goldman

Cast

- Mindy Kaling as Princess Buttercup (originally played by Robin Wright)
- Paul Rudd as Westley (originally played by Cary Elwes)
- Cary Elwes as Prince Humperdinck (originally played by Chris Sarandon; Elwes played Westley in the original film)
- Nick Kroll as Count Rugen (originally played by Christopher Guest) and the Impressive Clergyman (originally played by Peter Cook)
- Goran Višnjić as Inigo Montoya (originally played by Mandy Patinkin)
- Bill Fagerbakke as Fezzik (originally played by André the Giant)
- Patton Oswalt as Vizzini (originally played by Wallace Shawn)
- Kevin Pollak as Miracle Max (originally played by Billy Crystal) and other male roles
- Collette Wolfe as Valerie (originally played by Carol Kane) and other female roles
- Rob Reiner as the Grandfather (originally played by Peter Falk; Reiner directed the original film)
- Fred Savage as the Grandson (originally played by Fred Savage)

=== 2012 ===
==== January (Shampoo) ====
Shampoo by Robert Towne and Warren Beatty

Cast

- Bradley Cooper as George Roundy (originally played by Warren Beatty)
- Olivia Wilde as Jackie (originally played by Julie Christie)
- Kate Hudson as Jill (originally played by Hudson's mother, Goldie Hawn)
- Diane Lane as Felicia Karpf (originally played by Lee Grant)
- J. K. Simmons as Lester Karpf (originally played by Jack Warden)
- Nick Kroll as Johnny Pope (originally played by Tony Bill) and others
- Patton Oswalt as Norman (originally played by Jay Robinson) and others
- Lena Dunham as Lorna Karpf (originally played by Carrie Fisher) and others

==== February (Reservoir Dogs) ====
Reservoir Dogs by Quentin Tarantino. Reitman assembled an all-Black cast to play roles originally played on screen by white actors.

Cast

- Laurence Fishburne as Larry "Mr. White" Dimmick (originally played by Harvey Keitel)
- Cuba Gooding Jr. as Freddy "Mr. Orange" Newandyke (originally played by Tim Roth)
- Terrence Howard as Vic "Mr. Blonde" Vega (originally played by Michael Madsen)
- Anthony Mackie as Mr. Pink (originally played by Steve Buscemi)
- Anthony Anderson as "Nice Guy Eddie" Cabot (originally played by Chris Penn)
- Chi McBride as Joe Cabot (originally played by Lawrence Tierney)
- Common as Mr. Brown (originally played by Quentin Tarantino) and Officer Marvin Nash (originally played by Kirk Baltz)
- Patton Oswalt as K-Billy DJ (originally played by Steven Wright), Officer Holdaway (originally played by Randy Brooks; as Brooks was the only Black actor in the original film, Oswalt was the only white actor at the reading), and others

==== March (The Big Lebowski) ====
The Big Lebowski by the Coen brothers. Due to the huge turnout, speakers were set up outside to allow those without tickets limited access to the proceedings.

Cast

- Seth Rogen as The Dude (originally played by Jeff Bridges)
- Rainn Wilson as Walter Sobchak (originally played by John Goodman)
- Hank Azaria as Donny Kerbatsos (originally played by Steve Buscemi), Karl Hungus (originally played by Peter Stormare), Da Fino (originally played by Jon Polito), George Bush, and others
- Jason Alexander as the Big Lebowski (originally played by David Huddleston)
- Christina Hendricks as Maude Lebowski (originally played by Julianne Moore)
- Catherine Reitman as Bunny Lebowski (originally played by Tara Reid) and others
- Fred Savage as Brandt (originally played by Philip Seymour Hoffman), Smokey (originally played by Jimmie Dale Gilmore), a nihilist, and others (Savage was a last-minute replacement for Patton Oswalt)
- Sam Elliott as The Stranger (originally played by Sam Elliott)
- Nick Kroll as Jackie Treehorn (originally played by Ben Gazzara), Jesus Quintana (originally played by John Turturro), a nihilist, and others

==== April (The Apartment) ====
The Apartment by Billy Wilder and I. A. L. Diamond at The New York Times Center. This was the first of the Live Read series to take place outside of Los Angeles

Cast

- Paul Rudd as C.C. Baxter (originally played by Jack Lemmon)
- Emma Stone as Fran Kubelik (originally played by Shirley MacLaine)
- James Woods as Mr. Sheldrake (originally played by Fred MacMurray)
- Tom Cavanagh as Mr. Dobisch (originally played by Ray Walston)
- David Wain as Dr. Dreyfuss (originally played by Jack Kruschen)
- Jason Sudeikis as Mr. Kirkeby (originally played by David Lewis)
- Greta Gerwig as Sylvia (originally played by Joan Shawlee)
- Carla Buono as Miss Olsen (originally played by Edie Adams)

==== September (American Beauty) ====
American Beauty by Alan Ball at the Toronto International Film Festival.

Cast

- Bryan Cranston as Lester Burnham (originally played by Kevin Spacey)
- Christina Hendricks as Carolyn Burnham (originally played by Annette Bening) and others
- Mae Whitman as Jane Burnham (originally played by Thora Birch) and others
- Adam Driver as Ricky Fitts (originally played by Wes Bentley)
- Sarah Gadon as Angela Hayes (originally played by Mena Suvari) and Barbara Fitts (originally played by Allison Janney)
- Nick Kroll as Colonel Frank Fitts (originally played by Chris Cooper) and others
- Paul Scheer as Buddy Kane (originally played by Peter Gallagher) and others
- George Strombolopoulos as Jim Olmeyer (originally played by Scott Bakula) and others

Woody Harrelson was originally slated to play Colonel Fitts while Nick Kroll would play Buddy Kane, but when Harrelson was stuck in Hawaii, Kroll played Fitts and Paul Scheer played Kane.

==== October (Bull Durham) ====
Bull Durham by Ron Shelton

Cast

- J. K. Simmons as "Crash" Davis (originally played by Kevin Costner) and Jimmy (originally played by William O'Leary)
- Susan Sarandon as Annie Savoy (originally played by Sarandon)
- Andy Samberg as "Nuke" LaLoosh (originally played by Tim Robbins)
- Ron Shelton as Skip (originally played by Trey Wilson; Shelton wrote and directed the original film)
- David Koechner as Larry (originally played by Robert Wuhl)
- Johnny Simmons as Bobby (originally played by David Neidorf)
- Mae Whitman as Millie (originally played by Jenny Robertson)
- Jason Mantzoukas as Teddy (originally played by Garland Bunting)

==== November (Manhattan) ====
Manhattan by Woody Allen

Cast

- Stephen Merchant as Isaac Davis (originally played by Woody Allen)
- Olivia Munn as Mary Wilkie (originally played by Diane Keaton)
- Shailene Woodley as Tracy (originally played by Mariel Hemingway)
- Fred Savage as Yale Pollack (originally played by Michael Murphy)
- Mae Whitman as Emily Pollack (originally played by Anne Byrne)
- Erika Christensen as Jill Davis (originally played by Meryl Streep)
- Jason Mantzoukas as Dennis (originally played by Michael O'Donoghue)

==== December (Ghostbusters) ====
Ghostbusters by Dan Aykroyd and Harold Ramis. Jason Reitman's father Ivan Reitman directed the original film.

Cast

- Seth Rogen as Peter Venkman (originally played by Bill Murray)
- Jack Black as Ray Stantz (originally played by Dan Aykroyd)
- Rainn Wilson as Egon Spengler (originally played by Harold Ramis)
- Phil LaMarr as Winston Zeddemore (originally played by Ernie Hudson)
- Kristen Bell as Dana Barrett (originally played by Sigourney Weaver)
- Kevin Pollak as Walter Peck (originally played by William Atherton), Larry King, and Casey Kasem
- Mae Whitman as Janine Melnitz (originally played by Annie Potts)
- Paul Rust as Louis Tully (originally played by Rick Moranis)
- Paul Scheer as the mayor (originally played by David Marguiles), the male ESP volunteer (originally played by Steven Tash), and others

=== 2013 ===
==== January (His Girl Friday) ====
His Girl Friday by Charles Lederer, based on the play The Front Page by Ben Hecht and Charles MacArthur

Guest director: Fred Savage

Cast

- Jason Bateman as Walter Burns (originally played by Cary Grant)
- Anne Hathaway as Hildy Johnson (originally played by Rosalind Russell)
- Adam Scott as Bruce Baldwin (originally played by Ralph Bellamy)
- Paul Scheer as Sheriff Hartwell (originally played by Gene Lockhart)
- Nick Kroll as the Mayor (originally played by Clarence Kolb)
- Fred Willard as Earl Williams (originally played by John Qualen)
- Mae Whitman as Mollie Malloy (originally played by Helen Mack)
- Jason Mantzoukas as Eggelhoffer (originally played by Edwin Maxwell)

==== February (Glengarry Glen Ross) ====
Glengarry Glen Ross by David Mamet, based on the play by Mamet. Reitman assembled a cast of women to read the all-male script.

Cast

- Robin Wright as Richard Roma (originally played by Al Pacino)
- Catherine O'Hara as Shelley Levene (originally played by Jack Lemmon)
- Maria Bello as Dave Moss (originally played by Ed Harris)
- Melanie Lynskey as George Aaronow (originally played by Alan Arkin)
- Mae Whitman as John Williamson (originally played by Kevin Spacey)
- Carla Gugino as Blake (originally played by Alec Baldwin)

==== March (The Usual Suspects) ====
The Usual Suspects by Christopher McQuarrie

Cast

- Kevin Pollak as Dean Keaton (originally played by Gabriel Byrne; Pollak played Hockney in the original film)
- Michael C. Hall as Verbal Kint (originally played by Kevin Spacey)
- Chi McBride as Special Agent Dave Kujan (originally played by Chazz Palminteri)
- Adam Brody as Michael McManus (originally played by Stephen Baldwin)
- Mark Duplass as Todd Hockney (originally played by Kevin Pollak)
- Nick Kroll as Fred Fenster (originally played by Benicio del Toro)
- Mae Whitman as Kobayashi (originally played by Pete Postlethwaite) and Edie (originally played by Suzy Amis)
- Jason Mantzoukas as Special Agent Jack Baer (originally played by Giancarlo Esposito)

==== July (Breaking Bad's pilot episode) ====
The pilot of Breaking Bad by Vince Gilligan. This was the first television episode performed at the readings.

Cast

- Rainn Wilson as Walter White (originally played by Bryan Cranston)
- Mae Whitman as Jesse Pinkman (originally played by Aaron Paul)
- Annie Mumolo as Skyler White (originally played by Anna Gunn)
- Chi McBride as Hank Schrader (originally played by Dean Norris)
- Ellie Kemper as Marie Schrader (originally played by Betsy Brandt)
- Paul Rust as Walter White, Jr. (originally played by RJ Mitte)

==== September (Boogie Nights) ====
Boogie Nights by Paul Thomas Anderson at the Toronto International Film Festival

Cast

- Jesse Eisenberg as Dirk Diggler (originally played by Mark Wahlberg)
- Josh Brolin as Jack Horner (originally played by Burt Reynolds)
- Dakota Fanning as Rollergirl (originally played by Heather Graham)
- Olivia Wilde as Amber Waves (originally played by Julianne Moore)
- Jason Sudeikis as Buck Swope (originally played by Don Cheadle)
- Dane Cook as Reed Rothchild (originally played by John C. Reilly) and Maurice Rodriguez (originally played by Luis Guzmán)
- Marc-André Grondin as Scotty J (originally played by Philip Seymour Hoffman)
- Jarod Einsohn as Todd Parker (originally played by Thomas Jane)
- Scott Thompson as The Colonel (originally played by Robert Ridgely)
- Jordan Hayes as Jessie St. Vincent (originally played by Melora Walters)

==== October (Boogie Nights) ====
Boogie Nights by Paul Thomas Anderson

Cast

- Taylor Lautner as Dirk Diggler (originally played by Mark Wahlberg)
- Don Johnson as Jack Horner (originally played by Burt Reynolds)
- Mae Whitman as Rollergirl (originally played by Heather Graham)
- Judy Greer as Amber Waves (originally played by Julianne Moore) and Dirk's mother (originally played by Joanna Gleason)
- Jim Rash as Buck Swope (originally played by Don Cheadle) and Little Bill Thompson (originally played by William H. Macy)
- Nick Kroll as Reed Rothchild (originally played by John C. Reilly), Maurice Rodriguez (originally played by Luis Guzmán), Floyd Gondolli (originally played by Philip Baker Hall), and Rahad Jackson (originally played by Alfred Molina)
- Nat Faxon as Scotty J (originally played by Philip Seymour Hoffman)
- Jarod Einsohn as Todd Parker (originally played by Thomas Jane)
- Kevin Pollak as The Colonel (originally played by Robert Ridgely)
- Jurnee Smollett as Jessie St. Vincent (originally played by Melora Walters) and Becky Barnett (originally played by Nicole Ari Parker)

==== November (Tootsie) ====
Tootsie by Larry Gelbart and Murray Schisgal

Guest director: David Wain

Cast

- Nick Kroll as Michael Dorsey/Dorothy Michaels (originally played by Dustin Hoffman)
- Hannah Simone as Julie (originally played by Jessica Lange)
- Michaela Watkins as Sandy (originally played by Teri Garr)
- Thomas Lennon as Jeff (originally played by Bill Murray)
- Rob Huebel as George (originally played by Sydney Pollack)
- Ken Marino as Ron (originally played by Dabney Coleman)
- Fred Melamed as John Van Horn (originally played by George Gaynes)
- Zandy Hartig as April (originally played by Geena Davis)

==== December (Raising Arizona) ====
Raising Arizona by the Coen brothers

Guest director: Patton Oswalt

Cast

- Timothy Olyphant as H.I. McDunnough (originally played by Nicolas Cage)
- Amy Poehler as Edwina McDunnough (originally played by Holly Hunter)
- Jeff Garlin as Nathan Arizona (originally played by Trey Wilson)
- Keegan-Michael Key as Gale Snoats (originally played by John Goodman)
- Jordan Peele as Evelle Snoats (originally played by William Forsythe)
- Michael McKean as Glen (originally played by Sam McMurray)
- Rachael Harris as Dot (originally played by Frances McDormand)
- Ron Perlman as Lenny Smalls (originally played by Randall "Tex" Cobb)
- Andy Daly as various characters

=== 2014 ===
==== January (American Pie) ====
American Pie by Adam Herz. Reitman gender-swapped the cast, with women playing the male roles and men playing the female roles.

Cast

- Ari Graynor as Jim (originally played by Jason Biggs)
- Sarah Burns as Oz (originally played by Chris Klein)
- Olivia Wilde as Kevin (originally played by Thomas Ian Nicholas)
- Krysten Ritter as Finch (originally played by Eddie Kaye Thomas)
- Mike White as Michelle (originally played by Alyson Hannigan)
- Topher Grace as Vicky (originally played by Tara Reid)
- Anna Kendrick as Stifler (originally played by Seann William Scott)
- John Cho as Heather (originally played by Mena Suvari; Cho played John, MILF Guy #2 in the original film)
- Michael Sheen as Nadia (originally played by Shannon Elizabeth) and Stifler's mom (originally played by Jennifer Coolidge)
- Sharon Stone as Jim's dad (originally played by Eugene Levy)

==== February (Pulp Fiction) ====
Pulp Fiction by Quentin Tarantino

Guest director: Evan Goldberg

Cast

- Joseph Gordon-Levitt as Vincent Vega (originally played by John Travolta)
- Jordan Peele as Jules Winnfield (originally played by Samuel L. Jackson)
- Lizzy Caplan as Mia Wallace (originally played by Uma Thurman) and Honey Bunny (originally played by Amanda Plummer)
- Jonah Hill as Butch Coolidge (originally played by Bruce Willis) and Pumpkin (originally played by Tim Roth)
- Michael Chiklis as The Wolf (originally played by Harvey Keitel), Captain Koons (originally played by Christopher Walken), and Brett (originally played by Frank Whaley)
- Rebecca Romijn as Fabienne (originally played by Maria de Medeiros) and Esmarelda Villalobos (originally played by Angela Jones)
- Wendell Pierce as Marsellus Wallace (originally played by Ving Rhames)
- Seth Rogen as Lance (originally played by Eric Stoltz), Maynard (originally played by Duane Whitaker), and Jimmy Dimmick (originally played by Quentin Tarantino)

==== March (Groundhog Day) ====
Groundhog Day by Danny Rubin and Harold Ramis. Reitman chose this reading as a tribute to Harold Ramis, who died the previous month. He also chose an earlier draft of the screenplay rather than the final shooting script.

Cast

- Jason Bateman as Phil Connors (originally played by Bill Murray)
- Elizabeth Reaser as Rita (originally played by Andie MacDowell)
- Jeff Ross as Larry (originally played by Chris Elliott) and others
- Stephen Tobolowsky as Ned Ryerson (originally played by Tobolowsky)
- Mae Whitman as Nancy (originally played by Marita Geraghty) and others

==== April ====
===== The Graduate =====
April 17: The Graduate by Calder Willingham and Buck Henry. Based on the novel by Charles Webb.

Cast

- Sharon Stone as Mrs. Robinson (originally played by Anne Bancroft)
- Jay Baruchel as Benjamin Braddock (originally played by Dustin Hoffman)
- Mae Whitman as Elaine Robinson (originally played by Katharine Ross)
- Paul Scheer as Mr. Braddock (originally played by William Daniels) and others
- Kevin Pollak as Mr. Robinson (originally played by Murray Hamilton) and others
- Tig Notaro as Mrs. Braddock (originally played by Elizabeth Wilson)

===== The Hateful Eight =====
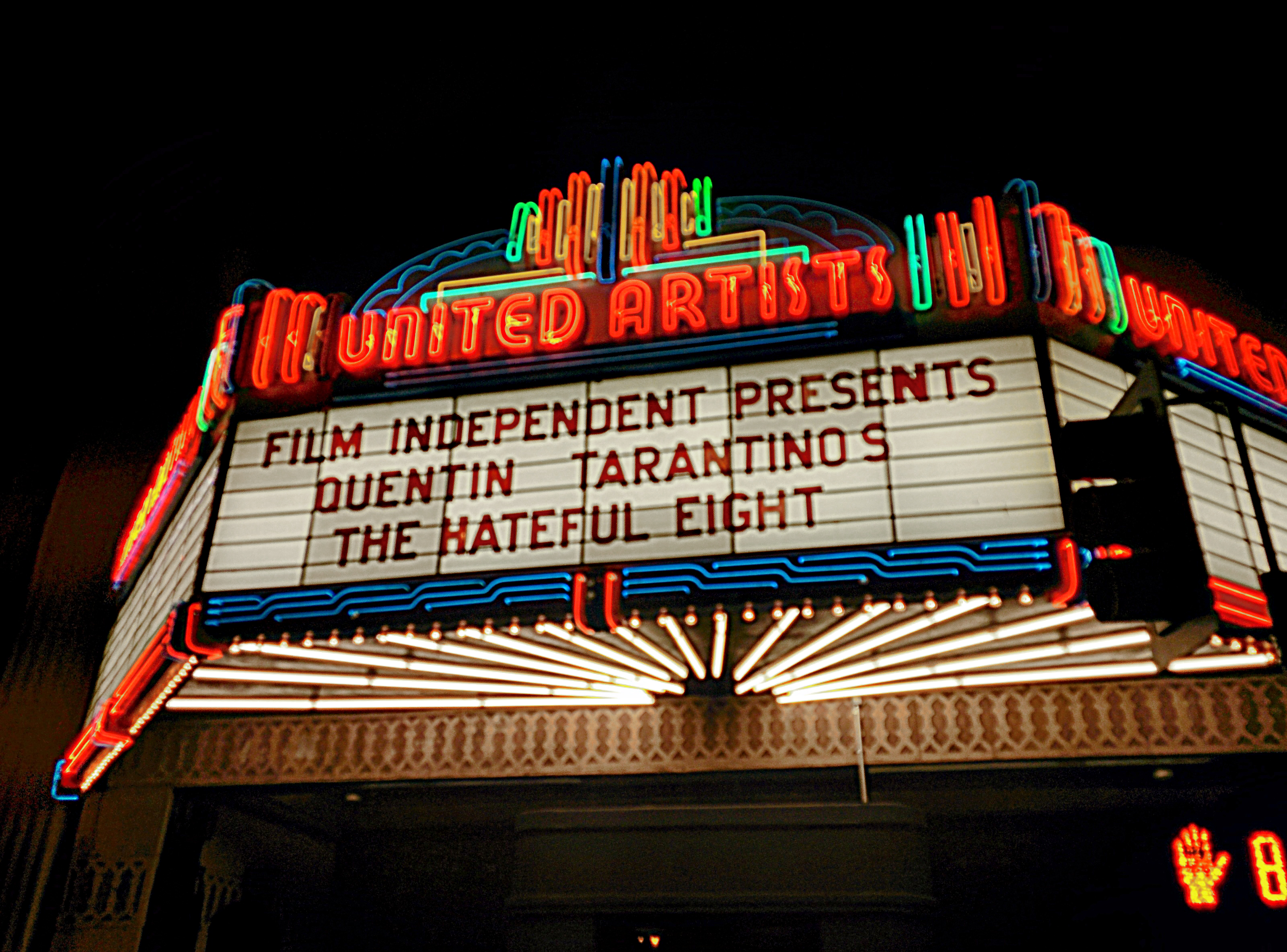
The Hateful Eight Live Reading at the Ace Hotel Los Angeles, as part of LACMA's Live Read series on April 19, 2014.

April 19, special event: The Hateful Eight by Quentin Tarantino at the United Artists Theater at the Ace Hotel Los Angeles. Unusually for the series, this script had not been filmed prior to the reading. After a script leak in January, Tarantino considered dropping the film, but decided to hold a reading of the first draft of this script.

Guest director: Quentin Tarantino

Cast

- Samuel L. Jackson as Major Marquis Warren
- Kurt Russell as John "The Hangman" Ruth
- Amber Tamblyn as Daisy Domergue
- Walton Goggins as Chris Maddox
- Bruce Dern as Confederate General Smithers
- Michael Madsen as John Gage
- Tim Roth as Oswaldo Mobray
- James Parks as O.B.
- Denis Ménochet as Bob
- James Remar as Jody
- Dana Gourrier as Minnie
- Zoë Bell as Six Horse Judy

==== October (American Beauty) ====
American Beauty by Alan Ball. All cast members starred in Jason Reitman's 2014 film Men, Women & Children.

Cast

- Adam Sandler as Lester Burnham (originally played by Kevin Spacey)
- Rosemarie DeWitt as Carolyn Burnham (originally played by Annette Bening) and Barbara Fitts (originally played by Allison Janney)
- Kaitlyn Dever as Jane Burnham (originally played by Thora Birch)
- Travis Tope as Ricky Fitts (originally played by Wes Bentley)
- Olivia Crocicchia as Angela Hayes (originally played by Mena Suvari)
- Dean Norris as Colonel Frank Fitts (originally played by Chris Cooper) and others
- Phil LaMarr as Buddy Kane (originally played by Peter Gallagher) and Jim Olmeyer (originally played by Scott Bakula) and others

==== November (Diner) ====
Diner by Barry Levinson. All cast members have appeared in a lead or recurring role in the FX show The League.

Cast

- Mark Duplass as Boogie (originally played by Mickey Rourke)
- Nadine Velazquez as Barbara (originally played by Kathryn Dowling)
- Stephen Rannazzisi as Eddie (originally played by Steve Guttenberg)
- Katie Aselton as Beth (originally played by Ellen Barkin)
- Rob Huebel as Billy (originally played by Tim Daly)
- Jason Mantzoukas as Modell (originally played by Paul Reiser)
- Paul Scheer as Shrevie (originally played by Daniel Stern)
- Nick Kroll as Fenwick (originally played by Kevin Bacon)

==== December (The Empire Strikes Back) ====
The Empire Strikes Back by Leigh Brackett and Lawrence Kasdan, story by George Lucas.

Cast

- Aaron Paul as Luke Skywalker (originally played by Mark Hamill)
- Elliot Page as Han Solo (originally played by Harrison Ford)
- Jessica Alba as Princess Leia Organa (originally played by Carrie Fisher)
- Dennis Haysbert as Lando Calrissian (originally played by Billy Dee Williams)
- Stephen Merchant as C-3PO (originally played by Anthony Daniels)
- Jason Reitman as R2-D2 (originally played by Kenny Baker), in addition to his usual reading of stage directions
- J. K. Simmons as Darth Vader (originally played by David Prowse and voiced by James Earl Jones)
- Kevin Pollak as Yoda (originally played by Frank Oz) and others
- Rainn Wilson as Chewbacca (originally played by Peter Mayhew)
- Mark Hamill as Obi-Wan Kenobi (originally played by Alec Guinness) and the Emperor (originally played by Clive Revill) (Hamill played Luke in the original film)

=== 2015 ===
==== January (Goodfellas) ====
Goodfellas by Nicholas Pileggi and Martin Scorsese. Based on Wiseguy by Pileggi.

Cast

- Fred Savage as Henry Hill (originally played by Ray Liotta)
- Eric André as Tommy (originally played by Joe Pesci)
- Laurence Fishburne as Jimmy (originally played by Robert De Niro)
- Michaela Watkins as Karen Hill (originally played by Lorraine Bracco)
- Joe Manganiello as Paul (originally played by Paul Sorvino)
- Mae Whitman as Sandy (originally played by Debi Mazar)
- Dane Cook as Morris (originally played by Chuck Low)

==== February (Sideways) ====
Sideways by Alexander Payne and Jim Taylor. Based on the novel by Rex Pickett.

Cast

- Josh Gad as Miles Raymond (originally played by Paul Giamatti)
- Keegan-Michael Key as Jack Cole (originally played by Thomas Haden Church)
- Michaela Watkins as Maya Randall (originally played by Virginia Madsen)
- Lake Bell as Stephanie (originally played by Sandra Oh)
- Catherine Reitman as Victoria (originally played by Jessica Hecht)

==== March (Dazed and Confused) ====
Dazed and Confused by Richard Linklater. Most actors except Travis Tope also played various freshmen.

Cast

- James Van Der Beek as Randall "Pink" Floyd (originally played by Jason London)
- Travis Tope as Mitch Kramer (originally played by Wiley Wiggins)
- Nick Kroll as Ron Slater (originally played by Rory Cochrane), Tony Olson (originally played by Anthony Rapp), and Fred O'Bannion (originally played by Ben Affleck)
- Mae Whitman as David Wooderson (originally played by Matthew McConaughey) and Sabrina Davis (originally played by Christin Hinojosa)
- Eric André as Don Dawson (originally played by Sasha Jenson)
- Michaela Watkins as Jodi Kramer (originally played by Michelle Burke) and Cynthia Dunn (originally played by Marissa Ribisi)
- Catherine Reitman as Kaye Faulkner (originally played by Christine Harnos)
- Jason Mantzoukas as Mike Newhouse (originally played by Adam Goldberg)
- Whitney Cummings as Julie Simms (originally played by Catherine Avril Morris) and Darla Marks (originally played by Parker Posey)
- Paul Scheer as Kevin Pickford (originally played by Shawn Andrews) and Clint Bruno (originally played by Nicky Katt)
- Jonathan Tucker as Benny O'Donnell (originally portrayed by Cole Hauser)

==== April (Major League) ====
Major League by David S. Ward

Guest director: Joe Manganiello. In a departure from Live Read tradition, Manganiello did not read the stage directions, but instead played a character. He cast sportscaster Rich Eisen as the narrator.

Cast

- Joe Manganiello as Jake Taylor (originally played by Tom Berenger)
- Brian Wilson as Ricky Vaughn (originally played by Charlie Sheen)
- Rob Huebel as Roger Dorn (originally played by Corbin Bernsen)
- Sharon Osbourne as Rachel Phelps (originally played by Margaret Whitton) and Suzanne Dorn (originally played by Stacy Carroll)
- Billy Gardell as Lou Brown (originally played by James Gammon)
- Ming-Na Wen as Lynn Wells (originally played by Rene Russo)
- Robbie Jones as Willie Mays Hayes (originally played by Wesley Snipes)
- Eric Stonestreet as Charlie Donovan (originally played by Charles Cyphers) and Eddie Harris (originally played by Chelcie Ross)
- Sofía Vergara as Pedro Cerrano (originally played by Dennis Haysbert)
- Thomas Lennon as Harry Doyle (originally played by Bob Uecker)

==== May ("The Wheel" from Mad Men) ====
The first-season finale of Mad Men, "The Wheel" by Matthew Weiner and Robin Veith. The reading was held on the same day as the premiere of the series finale and was followed by a screening of that episode.

Cast

- Colin Hanks as Don Draper (originally played by Jon Hamm; Hanks played Father John Gill in three episodes in the show's second season)
- Kaitlyn Dever as Peggy Olson (originally played by Elisabeth Moss)
- Fred Savage as Pete Campbell (originally played by Vincent Kartheiser) and Glen Bishop (originally played by Marten Holden Weiner)
- Mickey Sumner as Betty Draper (originally played by January Jones)
- Ashley Greene as Joan Holloway (originally played by Christina Hendricks), Annie (originally played by Kathrine Boecher) and others
- Brian Klugman as Paul Kinsey (originally played by Michael Gladis)
- Rob Huebel as Ken Cosgrove (originally played by Aaron Staton)
- David Wain as Harry Crane (originally played by Rich Sommer)
- Kevin Pollak as Bertram Cooper (originally played by Robert Morse) and Duck Phillips (originally played by Mark Moses)

==== June (Fast Times at Ridgemont High) ====
Fast Times at Ridgemont High by Cameron Crowe. Based on book Fast Times at Ridgemont High: A True Story by Crowe at the Los Angeles Film Festival

Guest director: Eli Roth

Cast

- Logan Paul as Jeff Spicoli (originally played by Sean Penn)
- Lily Collins as Stacy Hamilton (originally played by Jennifer Jason Leigh)
- Haley Joel Osment as Brad Hamilton (originally played by Judge Reinhold)
- Kumail Nanjiani as Mike Damone (originally played by Robert Romanus)
- Daryl Sabara as Mark "Rat" Ratner (originally played by Brian Backer)
- Lorenza Izzo as Linda Barrett (originally played by Phoebe Cates)
- Courtney Love as Mr. Hand (originally played by Ray Walston)
- Aaron Burns as Charles Jefferson (originally played by Forest Whitaker; Burns is a frequent collaborator of Roth's, both on- and off-camera)
- Nik Keswani as Curtis Spicoli (originally played by Patrick Brennan)

==== July (The Big Lebowski) ====
The Big Lebowski by the Coen brothers at the Just for Laughs Comedy Festival in Montreal

Cast

- Michael Fassbender as The Dude (originally played by Jeff Bridges)
- Patton Oswalt as Walter Sobchak (originally played by John Goodman)
- Jennifer Lawrence as Maude Lebowski (originally played by Julianne Moore)
- Olivia Munn as Bunny Lebowski (originally played by Tara Reid)
- Mae Whitman as Donnie (originally played by Steve Buscemi)
- Dennis Quaid as the Big Lebowski (originally played by David Huddleston)
- T.J. Miller as Brandt (originally played by Philip Seymour Hoffman)
- Mike Judge as The Stranger (originally played by Sam Elliott)
- Martin Starr as The Jesus (originally played by John Turturro)

Fassbender, Lawrence, and Munn would all appear in X-Men: Apocalypse. Miller and Starr appeared on the series Silicon Valley, created by Judge.

==== September (The Princess Bride) ====
The Princess Bride by William Goldman, based on the novel by Goldman at the 2015 Toronto International Film Festival.

Cast

- Cary Elwes as Westley (Elwes played the role in the original film)
- Rachel McAdams as Buttercup (originally played by Robin Wright) and Valerie (originally played by Carol Kane)
- Patrick Stewart as Prince Humperdinck (originally played by Chris Sarandon)
- Catherine Reitman and Gael García Bernal as Inigo Montoya (originally played by Mandy Patinkin)
- Chris O'Dowd as Count Rugen (originally played by Christopher Guest) and Miracle Max (originally played by Billy Crystal)
- Georges Laraque as Fezzik (originally played by André the Giant)
- Donald Glover as Vizzini (originally played by Wallace Shawn) and The Albino (originally played by Mel Smith)
- Rob Reiner as the Grandfather (originally played by Peter Falk; Reiner directed the original film)
- Gage Munroe as the Grandson (originally played by Fred Savage)

Gael Garcia Bernal was late for the show due to a delayed flight, so Catherine Reitman filled in until he arrived.

==== October (Ferris Bueller's Day Off) ====
Ferris Bueller's Day Off by John Hughes

- Fred Savage as Ferris Bueller (originally played by Matthew Broderick)
- Martin Starr as Cameron Frye (originally played by Alan Ruck)
- Catherine Reitman as Sloane Peterson (originally played by Mia Sara)
- Clark Gregg as Rooney (originally played by Jeffrey Jones)
- Mae Whitman as Jeannie Bueller (originally played by Jennifer Grey)
- Michaela Watkins as Grace (originally played by Edie McClurg)
- Richard Speight Jr. as Economics Teacher (originally played by Ben Stein)
- James Van Der Beek as Boy in Police Station (originally played Charlie Sheen)

==== November (Network) ====
Network by Paddy Chayefsky

Guest director: Scott Sternberg

- Aaron Sorkin as Howard Beale (originally played by Peter Finch)
- Minnie Driver as Diana Christenson (originally played by Faye Dunaway)
- Tony Goldwyn as Max Schumacher (originally played by William Holden)
- Dermot Mulroney as Frank Hackett (originally played by Robert Duvall)
- Fred Willard as Arthur Jensen (originally played by Ned Beatty)
- Nick Kroll as Nelson Chaney (originally played by Wesley Addy) and Great Ahmet Kahn (originally played by Arthur Burghardt)
- Alex Borstein as Louise Schumacher (originally played by Beatrice Straight)
- Lauryn Whitney as Laureen Hobbs (originally played by Marlene Warfield)
- Chelsey Crisp as Walter C. Amundsen (originally played by Jerome Dempsey)
- Warren Olney as narrator (originally played by Lee Richardson)

==== December (True Romance) ====
True Romance by Quentin Tarantino

- Christian Slater as Clarence Worley (originally played by Slater)
- Patricia Arquette as Alabama Whitman (originally played by Arquette)
- Mae Whitman as Dick Ritchie (originally played by Michael Rapaport)
- Paul Scheer as Elliot Blitzer (originally played by Bronson Pinchot) and others
- J. K. Simmons as Cliff Worley (originally played by Dennis Hopper) and others
- Jon Favreau as Virgil (originally played by James Gandolfini)
- Keegan-Michael Key as Drexl (originally played by Gary Oldman) and others
- Kevin Pollak as Vincenzo Coccotti (originally played by Christopher Walken), Lee Donowitz (originally played by Saul Rubinek), and others
- Jay Duplass as Detective Dimes (originally played by Chris Penn)
- Mark Duplass as Detective Nicholson (originally played by Tom Sizemore)
- Jason Segel as Floyd (originally played by Brad Pitt)

=== 2016 ===
==== January (Dr. Strangelove) ====
Dr. Strangelove by Stanley Kubrick, Terry Southern & Peter George. Based on the novel Red Alert by Peter George.

Guest director: Mark Romanek

- Josh Gad as Captain Lionel Mandrake (originally played by Peter Sellers)
- Catherine O'Hara as President Merkin Muffley (originally played by Peter Sellers)
- Patrick Stewart as Dr. Strangelove (originally played by Peter Sellers)
- Seth Rogen as General Buck Turgidson (originally played by George C. Scott)
- Shia LaBeouf as Brigadier General Jack D. Ripper (originally played by Sterling Hayden)
- Colin Hanks as Colonel Bat Guano (originally played by Keenan Wynn)
- Johnny Knoxville as T.J. "King" Kong (originally played by Slim Pickens)
- P. J. Byrne as Alexei de Sadeski (originally played by Peter Bull)
- Olivia Wilde as Miss Scott (originally played by Tracy Reed)
- Fred Willard as the narrator
- Fiona Apple sang "We'll Meet Again" to close out the reading. She was pied in the face by Johnny Knoxville.

==== February (The Maltese Falcon) ====
The Maltese Falcon by John Huston. Based on the novel by Dashiell Hammett.

Guest director: Laurence Fishburne. LACMA curator and event host Elvis Mitchell read the stage directions.

- Laurence Fishburne as Sam Spade (originally played by Humphrey Bogart)
- Cree Summer as Brigid O'Shaughnessy (originally played by Mary Astor)
- Orlando Jones as Joel Cairo (originally played by Peter Lorre)
- Liza Lapira as Effie Perine (originally played by Lee Patrick)
- Peter Mackenzie as Casper Gutman (originally played by Sydney Greenstreet)
- Spencer Garrett as Det. Tom Polhaus (originally played by Ward Bond)
- Langston Fishburne as Wilmer Cook (originally played by Elisha Cook Jr.)

==== March (Stand by Me) ====
Stand by Me by Bruce A. Evans & Raynold Gideon. Based on the novella The Body by Stephen King. Like the Glengarry Glen Ross reading, the all-male script was read by all women.

- Kaitlyn Dever as Gordie (originally played by Wil Wheaton)
- Elliot Page as Chris (originally played by River Phoenix; the reading took place before Page came out as transgender)
- Molly Ephraim as Teddy (originally played by Corey Feldman)
- Charlyne Yi as Vern (originally played by Jerry O'Connell)
- Kristen Schaal as Ace (originally played by Kiefer Sutherland)
- Collette Wolfe as Charlie (originally played by Gary Riley)
- Rosemarie DeWitt as adult Gordie, the narrator (originally played by Richard Dreyfuss)
- Sarah Thyre as various characters

==== April (Thank You For Smoking) ====
Thank You for Smoking by Jason Reitman. Based on the novel by Christopher Buckley. For the first time, Reitman staged a performance of one of his own scripts.

- Courtney B. Vance as Nick Naylor (originally played by Aaron Eckhart)
- Mae Whitman as Joey Naylor (originally played by Cameron Bright), Jack (originally played by Adam Brody), and other roles
- Ashley Greene as Heather Holloway (originally played by Katie Holmes)
- Rhea Seehorn as Polly Bailey (originally played by Maria Bello)
- Josh Gad as Bobby Jay Bliss (originally played by David Koechner; Patton Oswalt was originally slated to play this role, but was replaced by Gad at the last minute) and other roles
- Bill Simmons as Senator Ortolan Finistirre (originally played by William H. Macy)
- Tim Allen as the Captain (originally played by Robert Duvall)
- Ron Livingston as B.R. (originally played by J. K. Simmons)
- Tommy Dewey as Jeff Megall (originally played by Rob Lowe) and other roles

Reitman announced that this reading would be the last of the series.

=== 2018 ===
==== December (Casablanca) ====
For the first time since April 2016, Reitman directed another live read, featuring an all-female cast, of Casablanca, by Julius J. Epstein, Philip G. Epstein, and Howard Koch. The reading was sponsored by Astraea Lesbian Foundation for Justice.

- Elliot Page as Rick Blaine (originally played by Humphrey Bogart; the reading took place before Page came out as transgender)
- Kiersey Clemons as Ilsa Lund (originally played by Ingrid Bergman)
- Olivia Wilde as Victor Laszlo (originally played by Paul Henreid)
- Hannah Gadsby as Captain Louis Renault (originally played by Claude Rains)
- Emily Hampshire as Signor Ugarte (originally played by Peter Lorre)
- Indya Moore as Carl (originally played by S.Z. Sakall)
- Lea DeLaria
- Kate Moennig

=== 2019 ===
==== March (My Dinner With Andre) ====
Film Independent Presents, the producers of the Live Read series, resumed again with (what was supposed to be) My Dinner With Andre by Andre Gregory and Wallace Shawn with comedy stars Nick Kroll and John Mulaney. Hosted by Elvis Mitchell, the evening veered into a comedy put-on by Kroll and Mulaney, as the reading was staged with Michael Keaton and Paula Pell doing the main roles from the original script, heavily interrupted by Kroll and Mulaney's Oh, Hello characters Gil Faizon and George St. Geegland, respectively.

- Michael Keaton as Andre (originally played by Andre Gregory)
- Paula Pell as Wally (originally played by Wallace Shawn)
- Nick Kroll as Gil Faizon (reciting "own dialogue")
- John Mulaney as George St. Geegland (reciting "own dialogue")

==== June (When Harry Met Sally...) ====
When Harry Met Sally... by Nora Ephron.

Guest director: Randall Park. Park assembled a cast entirely of Asian-American actors. Film Independent curator and event host Elvis Mitchell read the stage directions.

- Steven Yeun as Harry (originally played by Billy Crystal)
- Maya Erskine as Sally (originally played by Meg Ryan)
- Jimmy O. Yang as Jess (originally played by Bruno Kirby)
- Liza Lapira as Marie (originally played by Carrie Fisher)
- Jae Suh Park as various characters
- Randall Park as various characters
- Performance of It Had to Be You and Our Love Is Here to Stay by singing duo Meg & Dia Frampton.

This was Elvis Mitchell's final night at the helm of Film Independent's signature screening series, which would continue under the purview of director of events Rachel Bleemer.

==== October (Singles) ====
Singles by Cameron Crowe.

Guest director: James Ponsoldt. Ponsoldt read the stage directions and acted as the host encouraging the audience to "wear their flannel".

A nice treat leading into evening's main event was an email from Crowe, which Ponsoldt read to the audience. "The movie came from a special time in my life", Crowe said. "I'd fallen in love with Seattle, and so many of the soulful members of the community." He went on to acknowledge the late Soundgarden frontman, who has a cameo in the film, saying: "Love live Chris Cornell!"

- Kelly Marie Tran as Janet Livermore (originally played by Bridget Fonda)
- Mamoudou Athie as Steve Dunne (originally played by Campbell Scott)
- Karen Gillan as Linda Powell (originally played by Kyra Sedgwick)
- Bart Davenport as Cliff Poncier (originally played by Matt Dillon)
- Lynn Shelton as Debbie Hunt (originally played by Sheila Kelley)
- Jay Duplass as various characters
- Kelvin Yu as various characters
- Singer-songwriter Bart Davenport took the stage to perform the Paul Westerberg classics "Dyslexic Heart" and "Waiting for Somebody", two standouts from Singles' classic alternative-rock-era encapsulating soundtrack "Singles: Original Motion Picture Soundtrack"

=== 2020 ===
==== February (Breaking Away) ====
Breaking Away by Steve Tesich

Guest directors: Michael Angelo Covino and Kyle Marvin, the creative team behind The Climb.

A live string quartet provided musical accompaniment.

- Taika Waititi as Moocher (originally played by Jackie Earle Haley)
- Dennis Christopher as Dave (originally played by Dennis Christopher)
- Michael Angelo Covino as Mike (originally played by Dennis Quaid)
- Skyler Gisondo as Cyril (originally played by Daniel Stern)
- K Callan as Mom (originally played by Barbara Barrie)
- Paul Dooley as Dad (originally played by Paul Dooley)
- Gayle Rankin as Katherine (originally played by Robyn Douglass)
- Andre Royo as Rod (originally played by Hart Bochner)

==== March (Eternal Sunshine of the Spotless Mind) ====
Eternal Sunshine of the Spotless Mind by Charlie Kaufman from a story by Kaufman, Michel Gondry, and Pierre Bismuth

Guest director: Brett Haley

- Tessa Thompson as Clementine Kruczynski (originally played by Kate Winslet)
- Martin Starr as Joel Barish (originally played by Jim Carrey)
- Kiersey Clemons as Patrick (originally played by Elijah Wood)
- Kelly Marie Tran as Mary (originally played by Kirsten Dunst)
- Nick Kroll as Stan (originally played by Mark Ruffalo)
- Jay Duplass as Dr. Mierzwiak (originally played by Tom Wilkinson)
- Bridget Regan as Carrie (originally played by Jane Adams)
- Ryan Hunt as Rob (originally played by David Cross)
- Singer-songwriter Miya Folick performed selections from Jon Brion's soundtrack as well as a rendition of "Everybody's Got to Learn Sometime", which was covered by Beck for the film.

=== 2021 ===
==== January (Bringing Up Baby) ====
Bringing Up Baby by Dudley Nichols and Hagar Wilde from a story by Wilde

Guest director: Paul Feig

Following the COVID-19 pandemic, Film Independent Presents hosted their first virtual live read event.

- Jane Levy as Susan Vance (originally played by Katharine Hepburn)
- Skylar Astin as David Huxley (originally played by Cary Grant)
- John Clarence Stewart as Major Applegate (originally played by Charles Ruggles) and Professor LaTouche (originally played by D'Arcy Corrigan)
- Alex Newell as Slocum (originally played by Walter Catlett) and Ms. Swallow (originally played by Virginia Walker)
- Mary Steenburgen as Aunt Elizabeth (originally played by May Robson)
- Marc Evan Jackson as Mrs. Gogarty (originally played by Leona Roberts), Dr Digby, Joe, Caddy, Doorman, Clerk, Motorcycle Cop, Head Waiter, Delivery Man, Zoo Official, Second Roustabout, First Roustabout, Circus Manager, Mac
- Jessica Rothe as Mr. Gogarty (originally played by Barry Fitzgerald), Elmer (originally played by John Kelly), and Alexander Peabody (originally played by George Irving)

==== November ====
===== Sunset Boulevard =====
Sunset Boulevard by Billy Wilder, Charles Brackett and D.M. Marshman Jr.

Guest director: Marlee Matlin

- Troy Kotsur as Joe Gillis (originally played by William Holden)
- Marque Richardson as voice of Joe Gillis
- Marlee Matlin as Norma Desmond (originally played by Gloria Swanson)
- Wendie Malick as voice of Norma Desmond
- Daniel Durant as Max Von Mayerling (originally played by Erich von Stroheim)
- Rafael Cibrian as voice of Max Von Mayerling
- John Maucere as Artie Green (originally played by Jack Webb)
- John Mese as voice of Artie Green
- Shoshannah Stern as Sheldrake (originally played by Fred Clark)
- Samira Wiley as voice of Sheldrake
- Michael Spady as Betty Schaefer (originally played by Nancy Olson)
- Tia Carrere as voice of Betty Schaefer
- Harry Ford as narrator/Joe Gillis (originally played by William Holden)
- Jon Wolfe Nelson as narrator

===== L.A. Story =====
L.A. Story by Steve Martin

Guest director: Marvin Lemus

- Gloria Calderon as Harris K. Telemacher (originally played by Steve Martin)
- Julissa Calderon as Sara McDowel (originally played by Victoria Tennant)
- Melinna Bobadilla as Trudi (originally played by Marilu Henner)
- Annie Gonzalez as SanDeE* (originally played by Sarah Jessica Parker)
- Sarunus Jackson as Roland Mackey, Freeway Sign (originally played by Richard E. Grant)
- Jessica Camacho as Ariel, Morris, Boxer, Maitre'D, Guest, New Weather Man, Harry Zell (originally played by Susan Forristal, Sam McMurray, Patrick Stewart, George Plimpton, John Lithgow, and additional)
- Melinna Bobadill as various characters

=== 2023 ===
==== February (Triangle of Sadness) ====
Triangle of Sadness by Ruben Östlund

Guest director: Ruben Östlund, writer and director of the original film

- Nicholas Braun as Carl (originally played by Harris Dickinson)
- Ayo Edebiri as Yaya (originally played by Charlbi Dean)
- Alison Brie as Paula (originally played by Vicki Berlin) and Ludmilla (originally played by Carolina Gynning)
- Fred Armisen as Dimitry (originally played by Zlatko Buric)
- Brett Goldstein as The Captain (originally played by Woody Harrelson)
- Simona Tabasco as Abigail (originally played by Dolly de Leon) and Clementine (originally played by Amanda Walker)
- Tia Carrere as Vera (originally played by Sunnyi Melles)
- Kathryn Newton as Jarmo (originally played by Henrik Dorsin)
- Jordan Firstman as Winston (originally played by Oliver Ford Davies) and various characters
- Aparna Nancherla as Therese (originally played by Iris Berben) and various characters

==== April (Jennifer's Body) ====
Jennifer's Body by Diablo Cody

Guest director: Karyn Kusama, director of the original film

- Rachel Sennott as Jennifer Check (originally played by Megan Fox)
- Ella Purnell as Anita "Needy" Lesnicki (originally played by Amanda Seyfried)
- Daryl McCormack as Nikolai Wolf (originally played by Adam Brody)
- Dylan Minnette as Chip Dove (originally played by Johnny Simmons)
- Mädchen Amick as Toni Lesnecki (originally played by Amy Sedaris) and various characters
- Paul Scheer as Mr. Wroblewski (originally played by J.K. Simmons) and various characters

==== June (Back to the Future) ====
Back to the Future by Robert Zemeckis and Bob Gale

Guest director: Ben Schwartz

- Ben Schwartz as Marty McFly (originally played by Michael J. Fox)
- Bobby Moynihan as Dr. Emmett "Doc" Brown (originally played by Christopher Lloyd)
- Quinta Brunson as Lorraine Baines-McFly (originally played by Lea Thompson)
- Drew Tarver as George McFly (originally played by Crispin Glover)
- Sam Richardson as Biff Tannen (originally played by Thomas F. Wilson) and various characters
- Tawny Newsome as Jennifer Parker (originally played by Claudia Wells) and various characters
- Gil Ozeri as various characters

Stage directions were read by Scott Aukerman.

=== 2024 ===
==== February (Anatomy of a Fall) ====
Anatomy of a Fall by Justine Triet and Arthur Harari

Guest director: Justine Triet, writer and director of the original film

- Franklin Leonard as narrator
- Riley Keough as Sandra (originally played by Sandra Hüller)
- Bob Odenkirk as Vincent (originally played by Swann Arlaud)
- Kate Berlant as Daniel (originally played by Milo Machado-Graner)
- Sherry Cola as Nour (originally played by Saadia Bentaïeb)
- Brett Goldstein as Prosecutor Attorney General (originally played by Antoine Reinartz)
- Jay Ellis as Samuel (originally played by Samuel Theis), Radio Journalist (originally played by Nesrine Slaoui), and Expert Witness Bogaert (originally played by Anne-Lise Heimburger)
- Olivia Wilde as Monica (originally played by Sophie Fillières), Dr. Jammal (originally played by Wajdi Mouawad), Chief Investigator (originally played by Sacha Wolff), and TV Host (originally played by Kareen Guiock Thuram)
- Danny Ramirez as Marge (originally played by Jehnny Beth), Forensic Pathologist (originally played by Vincent Courcelle-Labrousse), Literary Critic (originally played by Arthur Harari), and Assistant 2 (originally played by Nola Jolly)
- Quincy Isaiah as Expert Witness Balard (originally played by Antoine Buéno), Judge Janvier (originally played by Pierre-François Garel), Presiding Judge/La Presidente (originally played by Anne Rotger), National News Journalist (originally played by Marie Brette)
- Tig Notaro as Zoe (originally played by Camille Rutherford), Judge Bollene (originally played by Cécile Brunet-Ludet), and Courthouse Journalist (originally played by Christophe Devaux)
- Messi the Dog as Snoop (originally played by Messi the Dog)

==== June ====
===== Wayne's World =====
Wayne's World by Mike Myers, Bonnie Turner and Terry Turner

Guest director: Zoe Lister-Jones

- Sophia Bush as narrator
- Abbi Jacobson as Wayne Campbell (originally played by Mike Myers)
- Zoe Lister-Jones as Garth Algar (originally played by Dana Carvey)
- Poppy Liu as Cassandra Wong (originally played by Tia Carrere)
- Sherry Cola as Benjamin Kane (originally played by Rob Lowe) and various characters
- Nicole Byer as Russell Finley (originally played by Kurt Fuller)
- Meatball as Stacy (originally played by Lara Flynn Boyle)
- Nori Reed as Noah Vanderhoff (originally played by Brian Doyle-Murray)
- Robby Hoffman as various characters
- Kate Moennig as various characters
- Dylan Mulvaney as various characters

A special appearance was made by Tia Carrere who played Cassandra in the original film. Music from the film was performed by Miya Folick, featuring Amelia Randall Meath (Sylvan Esso) and Claud.

===== Napoleon Dynamite =====
Napoleon Dynamite by Jared and Jerusha Hess

Guest director: Natalie Morales

- Nadia Quinn as narrator
- Natalie Morales as Napoleon (originally played by Jon Heder)
- Rachel Bloom as Uncle Rico (originally played by Jon Gries)
- Annie Gonzalez as Pedro (originally played by Efren Ramirez)
- Rachael Leigh Cook as Kip (originally played by Aaron Ruell)
- Sam Richardson as Deb (originally played by Tina Majorino)
- Keyla Monterroso Mejia as Don (originally played by Trevor Snarr) and various characters
- Justin Kirk as various characters
- Cyrina Fiallo as various characters
- Anthony Hill as various characters
- Brit Morgan as various characters

=== 2025 ===
==== February (Conclave) ====
Conclave by Peter Straughan, based on the novel by Robert Harris

Guest director: Edward Berger, director of the original film

- Peter Straughan, the screenwriter, as narrator
- Brett Goldstein as Cardinal Lawrence (originally played by Ralph Fiennes)
- Josh Gad as Cardinal Bellini (originally played by Stanley Tucci)
- Eugenio Derbez as Cardinal Benitez (originally played by Carlos Diehz)
- B.J. Novak as Cardinal Tremblay (originally played by John Lithgow)
- Lionel Boyce as Cardinal Adeyemi (originally played by Lucian Msamati)
- Cooper Koch as Cardinal Tedesco (originally played by Sergio Castellitto)
- Ayo Edebiri as Sister Agnes (originally played by Isabella Rossellini)
- Patton Oswalt as Monsignor O'Malley (originally played by Brian F. O'Byrne) and various characters
- Jason Mantzoukas as Archbishop Wosniak (originally played by Jacek Koman) and various characters

==== April (Cruel Intentions) ====
Cruel Intentions by Roger Kumble

Guest director: Julio Torres

- Justice Smith as Sebastian Valmont (originally played by Ryan Phillipe)
- Cristin Milioti as Annette Hargrove (originally played by Reese Witherspoon)
- Martine Gutierrez as Kathryn Merteuil (originally played by Sarah Michelle Gellar)
- Julia Fox as Cecile Caldwell (originally played by Selma Blair)
- Jaboukie Young-White as Ronald Clifford (originally played by Sean Patrick Thomas)
- Amy Sedaris as Bunny Caldwell (originally played by Christine Baranski) and various characters
- James Scully as Blaine Tuttle (originally played by Joshua Jackson) and various characters
- Tomas Matos as Greg McConnell (originally played by Eric Mabius) and various characters
- Spike Einbinder as narrator

The live read was held at the DGA Theater in New York City. The song "Bitter Sweet Symphony", from the film's end credits was performed by Boy Radio.

June (Only Murders in the Building)

Only Murders in the Building by John Hoffman and Steve Martin

Guest narrator: Carla Renata

- Aisha Tyler as Charles Haden-Savage (originally played by Steve Martin)
- Rachel Bloom as Oliver Putnam (originally played by Martin Short)
- Sherry Cola as Mabel Mora (originally played by Selena Gomez)
- Jason Ritter as Loretta Durkin (originally played by Meryl Streep)
- Annie Gonzalez as Bev Melon (originally played by Molly Shannon)
- Patton Oswalt as Doreen (originally played by Melissa McCarthy)
- Lil Rel Howery as Howard Morris (originally played by Michael Cyril Creighton)
- Meatball as Zach Galifiankis (originally played by Zach Galifianakis)
- Peri Gilpin as Eva Longoria (originally played by Eva Longoria)
- Alison Rich as Eugune Levy (originally played by Eugene Levy)

The live read was held at the Wallis Annenberg Center For the Performing Arts in Beverly Hills. Musical accompaniment was provided by Siddharth Khosla.

August (Single White Female)

Single White Female by Barbet Schroeder

Guest director: Alex Russell

- Archie Madekwe as Allison Jones (originally played by Jennifer Jason Leigh)
- Théodore Pellerin as Hedra Carlson (originally played by Bridget Fonda)
- Zack Fox as Sam Rawson (originally played by Steven Weber)
- Andrea Jin as Graham Knox (originally played by Peter Friedman)
- Cam Hicks as various characters
- Brian Niles as Mitchell Myerson (originally played by Stephen Tobolowsky) and various characters

The live read was held at the Harmony Gold Preview House in Hollywood. The cast was made up of cast members from the 2025 movie Lurker written/directed by Alex Russell. The musician King P provided musical accompaniment on saxophone.

2026

February 9 (Zootopia 2)

Zootopia 2 by Jared Bush and Byron Howard

Guest directors/narrators: Jared Bush and Byron Howard

- Ginnifer Goodwin as Judy Hopps
- Alex Edelman as Nick Wilde (originally played by Jason Bateman)
- Sam Richardson as Pawbert (originally played by Andy Samberg)
- Asif Ali as Gary De'Snake (originally played by Ke Huy Quan)
- Keith David as Milton Lynxley (originally played by David Strathairn)
- Nicole Byer as Nibbles Maplestick (originally played by Fortune Feimster)
- Patrick Warburton as Mayor Winddancer
- Alan Tudyk as various characters
- Yvette Nicole Brown as various characters
- Josh Dallas as various characters
- Nate Torrence as various characters

The event was held at the Wallis Annenberg Center for the Performing Arts. Music and sound effects were provided by JC Wright, Samson Trinh, Joban Gill, Andrew Crawford, and Geremy Mumenthaler

February 24 (It Was Just An Accident)

It Was Just an Accident by Jafar Panahi

Guest director/narrator: James Sweeney

- Mo Amer as Eghbal (originally played by Ebrahim Azizi)
- Payam Banifaz as Vahid (originally played by Vahid Mobasseri)
- Mitra Jouhari as Shiva (originally played by Mariam Afshari)
- Artemis Pebdani as Golrokh (originally played by Hadis Pakbaten)
- Reza Diako as Hamid (originally played by Mohamad Ali Elyasmehr)
- Omar Benson Miller as Ali (originally played by Majid Panahi)

The event was held at the Wallis Annenberg Center for the Performing Arts with musical guest Hamid Behrouzinia.

May 19 (Heathers)

Heathers by Michael Lehmann

Guest director/narrator: Meredith Alloway

- Taylour Page as Veronica Sawyer (originally played by Winona Ryder)
- Young Mazino as Jason Dean (originally played by Christian Slater)
- Olivia Holt as Heather Chandler (originally played by Kim Walker)
- Patti Harrison as Heather McNamara (originally played by Lisanne Falk)
- Ivy Wolk as Heather Duke (originally played by Shannen Doherty)
- Devon Walker as various characters
- Andrew Dismukes as various characters
- Mason Gooding as various characters
- Ariela Barer as various characters

The event was held at the Directors Guild of America in New York City with musical guest Matt Hunziker.

June 5 (Abbott Elementary)

Abbott Elementary by Quinta Brunson

Guest narrator: Luke Tennie

- Shabana Azeez as Janine Teagues (originally played by Quinta Brunson)
- Dewayne Perkins as Gregory Eddie (originally played by Tyler James Williams)
- Skye P. Marshall as Ave Coleman (originally played by Janelle James)
- Jazz Raycole as Barbara Howard (originally played by Sheryl Lee Ralph)
- Mary Holland as Melissa Schemmenti (originally played by Lisa Ann Walter)
- Asif Ali as Jacob Hill (originally played by Chris Perfetti)
- Lil Rel Howery as Mr. Johnson (originally played by William Stanford Davis)
- Kevin Avery as various characters
- Echo Kellum as various characters

The event was held at the Wallis Annenberg Center for the Performing Arts in Beverly Hills, California.

June 10 (The Boys)

The Boys by Eric Kripke

Guest narrator: Ely Henry (Henry previously played the Worm in season 5.)

- Justice Smith as Hughie Campbell (originally played by Jack Quaid)
- Chris Diamantopoulos as Billy Butcher (originally played by Karl Urban)
- London Thor as Starlight (originally played by Erin Moriarty) and various characters (Thor previously played Jordan Li in its spin off series, Gen V)
- Ethan Peck as The Deep (originally played by Chace Crawford) and various characters
- Rachael Harris as Madelyn Stillwell (originally played by Elisabeth Shue) and various characters
- Michael Strassner as Oh Father (originally played by Daveed Diggs) and various characters
- Seth Green as Translucent (originally played by Alex Hassell) and various characters
- Utkarsh Ambudkar as Homelander (originally played by Antony Starr) and various characters

The event was held at the Harmony Gold Preview House in Hollywood, California.

July 28 (Secretary)

Secretary by Steven Shainberg

Director/narrator: Jane Schoenbrun

- Gillian Anderson as E. Edward Grey (originally played by James Spader)
- Hannah Einbinder as Lee Holloway (originally played by Maggie Gyllenhaal)
- Jack Haven as Peter (originally played by Jeremy Davies) and various characters
- Sepi Mashiahof as Joan Holloway (originally played by Lesley Ann Warren) and various characters
- Jess McLeod as Theresa (originally played by Amy Locane) and various characters
- Willy McGee as Stewart (originally played by Michael Mantell) and various characters

The event was held at the Wallis Annenberg Center for the Performing Arts in Beverly Hills. Secretary screenwriter, Erin Cressica Wilson, and Cinematographer, Steven Fierberg, did an intro for the live-read. Musical accompaniment was provided by the band, Goof.

== Trivia ==
- As of April 2025, the following actors have participated in multiple readings:
  - Seventeen: Mae Whitman (including all eight of the 2012–13 season)
  - Fourteen: Nick Kroll (including the joke My Dinner with Andre reading)
  - Eight: Kevin Pollak and Paul Scheer
  - Seven: Jason Mantzoukas
  - Six: Patton Oswalt (also directed a reading), Fred Savage (also directed a reading), Olivia Wilde
  - Five: Rob Huebel, J. K. Simmons, Catherine Reitman, Michaela Watkins
  - Four: Josh Gad, Seth Rogen, Rainn Wilson
  - Three: Kaitlyn Dever, Jay Duplass, Mark Duplass, Laurence Fishburne (directed one of the readings in which he played a character), Brett Goldstein, Mindy Kaling, Keegan-Michael Key, Chi McBride, Martin Starr, James Van Der Beek, Fred Willard, Collette Wolfe, Elliot Page
  - Two: Eric André, Jason Bateman, Tia Carrere (also made a special appearance at a reading), Michael Chiklis, Kiersey Clemons, Sherry Cola, Dane Cook, Rosemarie DeWitt, Ayo Edebiri, Jarod Einsohn (played the same character in two readings of the same film), Cary Elwes (played different characters in two readings of the same film), Ashley Greene, Colin Hanks, Christina Hendricks, Phil LaMarr, Liza Lapira, Thomas Lennon, Joe Manganiello (directed one of the readings in which he played a character), Stephen Merchant, Olivia Munn, Tig Notaro, Catherine O'Hara, Aaron Paul, Jordan Peele, Rob Reiner (played the same character in two readings of the same film), Sam Richardson, Paul Rudd, Paul Rust, Patrick Stewart, Sharon Stone, Jason Sudeikis, Travis Tope, Kelly Marie Tran, David Wain (also directed a reading)
- Tia Carrere, Bryan Cranston, Dennis Haysbert, Christina Hendricks, Samuel L. Jackson, Phil LaMarr, Michael Madsen, Dean Norris, Aaron Paul, Kevin Pollak, Dennis Quaid, Tim Roth, Fred Savage, Amy Sedaris, J. K. Simmons and Robin Wright all played a character in one of the original films or episodes and have read for a character at a reading of another film or episode. Quentin Tarantino played characters in two of the original films and directed a reading. Ron Shelton wrote and directed one of the original films and played a character in the reading of that film.
- John Cho, Cary Elwes, Mark Hamill, and Kevin Pollak have each read a screenplay they have appeared in, reading roles they hadn't originally played.
- Patricia Arquette, Dennis Christopher, Paul Dooley, Sam Elliott, Cary Elwes, Susan Sarandon, Fred Savage, Christian Slater, and Stephen Tobolowsky have each read a screenplay they have appeared in, reading roles they originally played. Zoë Bell, Bruce Dern, Walton Goggins, Dana Gourrier, Samuel L. Jackson, Michael Madsen, James Parks, Tim Roth, and Kurt Russell all read for characters that they eventually played in The Hateful Eight.
- Edward Berger, Karyn Kusama, Ruben Östlund, Jason Reitman, and Quentin Tarantino have all directed live reads for films they wrote an/or directed; Peter Straughan, the screenwriter of Berger's film Conclave, narrated the reading of that screenplay.
- Four screenplays written by Quentin Tarantino have been read, including the then-unreleased The Hateful Eight. Two screenplays each by the Coen brothers, Cameron Crowe, John Hughes, Harold Ramis, and Billy Wilder have been read.

== Other events ==
On March 23, 2014, Jensen Karp assembled a cast to read Space Jam by Leo Benvenuti, Steve Rudnick, Timothy Harris and Herschel Weingrod at the UCB Theatre in Los Angeles. The event was in many ways a parody of Reitman's series. While the scripts Reitman chooses are from well-received and occasionally Academy Award-winning films, Space Jam is a children's film that received, at best, mixed reviews. In addition, LACMA's Bing Theater is a large auditorium, while the UCB Theatre is a small comedy club. The cast included:

- Blake Griffin as Michael Jordan
- Seth Green as Bugs Bunny (originally voiced by Billy West)
- Nick Kroll as Daffy Duck (originally voiced by Dee Bradley Baker) and Bill Murray
- Danielle Fishel as Lola Bunny (originally voiced by Kath Soucie), Juanita Jordan (originally played by Theresa Randle), Nick Van Exel and others
- Ralph Garman as Porky Pig (originally voiced by Bob Bergen), Yosemite Sam (originally voiced by Bill Farmer), Sylvester (originally voiced by Bill Farmer), Foghorn Leghorn (originally voiced by Bill Farmer), Marvin the Martian (originally voiced by Bob Bergen) and others
- Paul Scheer as Stan Podolak (originally played by Wayne Knight)
- DeAndre Jordan as Charles Barkley and Mr. Swackhammer (originally voiced by Danny DeVito)
- Jerrod Carmichael as Muggsy Bogues, Marcus Jordan (originally played by Eric Gordon), James Jordan Sr. (originally played by Thom Barry) and others
- Ben Schwartz as Zilch, an amalgamation of all of the Nerdlucks/Monstars
