= Travis Tope =

American actor (born 1991)

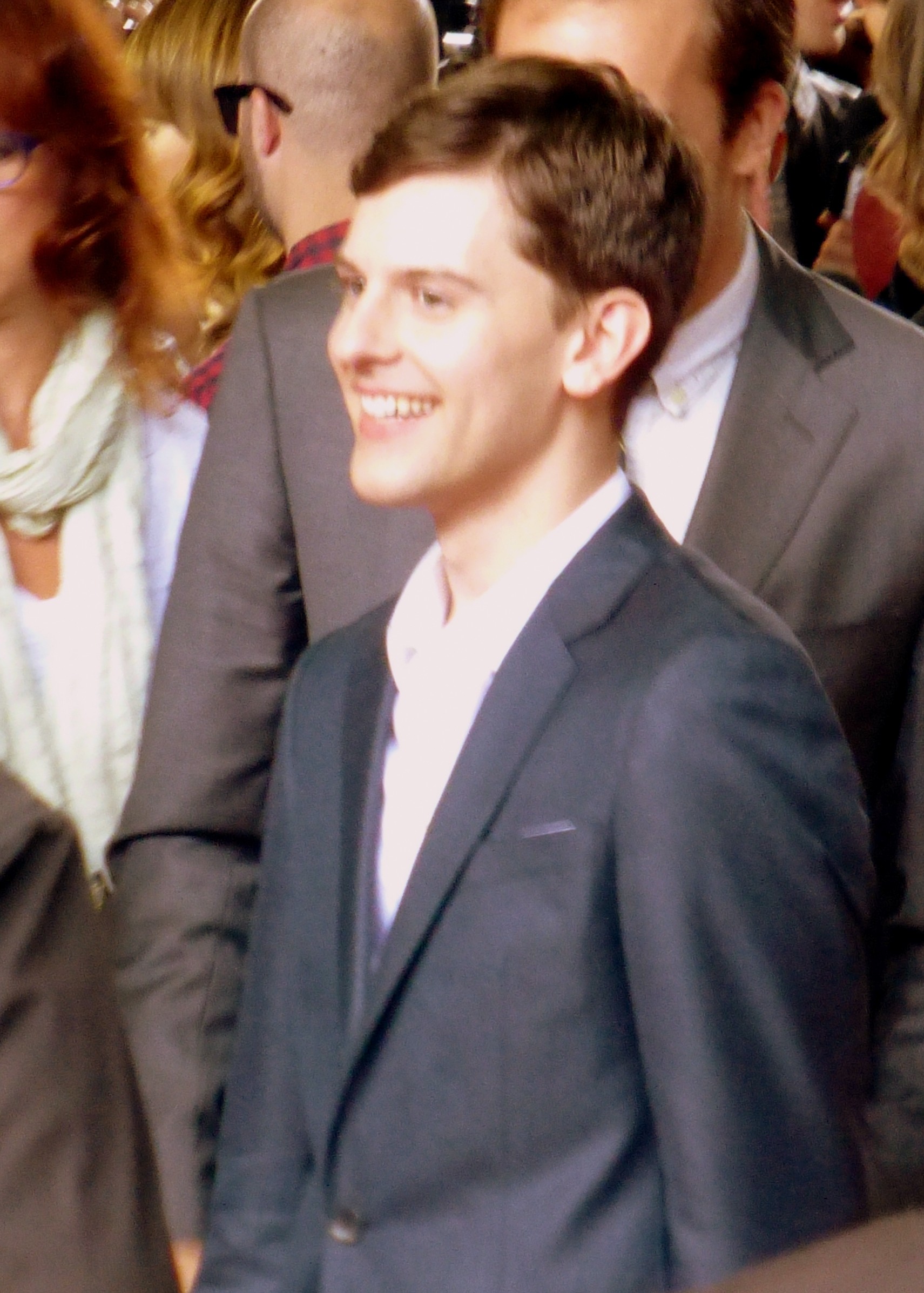
- Tope at the 2014 Toronto Film Festival
- Born: November 11, 1991 (age 34); Plano, Texas, U.S.
- Occupation: Actor
- Years active: 2007–present

Travis Tope (born November 11, 1991) is an American film and television actor, known for playing Chris Truby in the film Men, Women and Children, Nick Strain in The Town That Dreaded Sundown, Joe Harper/Tommy Darmody in the series Boardwalk Empire, and Kevin McClain in the Netflix mockumentary American Vandal.

== Early life ==
Tope is a Texas native, born November 11, 1991. He was living in Plano before he started auditioning for acting roles. In January 2010, as a member of Plano's Boy Scout Troop 1000, Tope was awarded the rank of Eagle Scout.

== Career ==
In 2014, Tope starred as JT Doyle in the drama Little Accidents opposite Elizabeth Banks and Boyd Holbrook, with Sara Colangelo directing. It premiered at the Sundance Film Festival on January 22, 2014, and was released on January 16, 2015, by Amplify. Then Tope played the role Chris Truby in the drama Men, Women & Children along with Adam Sandler and Rosemarie DeWitt, and directed by Jason Reitman. The film had premiered on September 6, 2014, at TIFF and was released domestically on October 1, 2014, by Paramount Pictures. Then he played the lead role of Nick Strain in the slasher horror film The Town That Dreaded Sundown along with Addison Timlin, which was directed by Alfonso Gomez-Rejon. The film was released by Orion Pictures on October 16, 2014. He then played Joe Harper in the final fifth season of the HBO series Boardwalk Empire.

Before starring in Men, Women & Children, Tope was offered roles in three different films, including The Gambler with Mark Wahlberg, Men, Women & Children, and young adult thriller November Criminals alongside Chloë Grace Moretz. He passed on both The Gambler and November Criminals and started shooting Men, Women & Children the next month. Tope was also offered a role in Ryan Gosling's directorial debut, How to Catch a Monster, which he passed on. The role was played by Iain De Caestecker. He was also asked to give a screen test for a role in Night at the Museum 3, but he passed on that, too.

In October 2014, at the Live Reading of the script of the 1999 film American Beauty, Tope read the role of Ricky Fitts, originally played by Wes Bentley.

In 2015, Tope starred in the premiere episode "The Battle Creek Way" of the CBS comedy series Battle Creek as Ricky. Later he appeared as Wyatt Maslow in the episode "Blaze of Glory" in the sixth season of another CBS series, NCIS: Los Angeles.

Tope has played the role of male lead Evan Klein in the Blumhouse science-fiction horror film Viral opposite Lio Tipton (credited as Analeigh Tipton) and Sofia Black-D'Elia, which Henry Joost and Ariel Schulman directed. The film was scheduled to be released on February 19, 2016, by Dimension Films.

Tope played Charlie Miller in the science-fiction disaster film Independence Day: Resurgence, along with Liam Hemsworth and Jessie Usher, directed by Roland Emmerich. The film was released on June 24, 2016, by 20th Century Fox.

== Filmography ==
=== Film ===
Year	Title	Role	Notes
2007	Divine Souls	David	
2014	Little Accidents	JT Doyle	
2014	Men, Women & Children	Chris Truby	
2014	The Town That Dreaded Sundown	Nick	
2016	Independence Day: Resurgence	Charlie Miller	
2016	Viral	Evan Klein	
2017	Say You Will	Sam Nimitz	
2018	Seven in Heaven	Jude	
2021	Disfluency	Dylan	
2022	Good Girl Jane	Jamie	

=== Television ===
Year	Title	Role	Notes
2014	Boardwalk Empire	Joe Harper / Tommy Darmody	6 Episodes
2015	Battle Creek	Ricky	1 Episode
2015	NCIS: Los Angeles	Wyatt Maslow	1 Episode
2016	Last Man Standing	Rob	4 Episodes
2018	American Vandal	Kevin McClain	8 Episodes
