= Seven in Heaven =

- Official poster
- Directed by: Chris Eigeman
- Written by: Chris Eigeman
- Produced by: Jason Blum; Tony Roman
- Starring: Travis Tope; Haley Ramm; Gary Cole; Jacinda Barrett
- Cinematography: Karim Hussain
- Edited by: D. Gillian Truster
- Music by: Peter Salett
- Production company: Blumhouse Productions
- Distributed by: Universal Pictures
- Release date: October 5, 2018
- Running time: 94 minutes
- Country: United States
- Language: English

Seven in Heaven is a 2018 American supernatural horror film written and directed by Chris Eigeman. It stars Travis Tope and Haley Ramm. Jason Blum served as producer, through his Blumhouse Productions banner. The film was released on October 5, 2018, by Universal Pictures.

== Plot ==
Quiet and nerdy Jude attends a party at his friend David's home with his friend Kent. At the party, Derek and his friends begins a game of "Seven in Heaven", with winning cards sending Jude and June to sit for seven minutes in a secret closet. Upon exiting the closet, they discover they have traveled to an alternate reality. Jude heads home, where he is attacked by his father, who in his reality is dead.

Jude's parents reveal he has been accused of murdering his acquaintance Derek. As the police are looking for him he escapes and is soon found by his guidance counselor, Mr. Wallace, who knows about this dimension. He forces Jude into his car and drops him off at David's home. Jude sneaks to the master bedroom and enters the closet, but nothing happens. He decides to look for June in the hope that if they try leaving through the closet together they will return home.

He finds June and, after convincing her they are in another dimension, they try to come up with a plan to get home. Mr. Wallace drives them to David's home and convinces David's family to let them into the closet. While there, Jude and June have sex.

In their home reality, Jude and June's friends have opened the closet and discovered it empty. The house is searched for them but no one can explain how they disappeared. Kent and Derek search for June and Jude while dodging the police, who are trying to break up the party due to noise complaints.

Jude and June find themselves in yet another alternate dimension, where Derek forces them to play a sinister variation on Truth or Dare. They are saved again by Mr. Wallace, who explains that this dimension is where everyone's worst thoughts take over. The crowd continues to follow them as they speed toward the house and Jude concocts a plan to help them get home. Mr. Wallace helps them by burning down the house to "reset" the game. The angry crowd is stopped outside, watching as the house burns. Jude explains how the house burning will help them get home, convincing June that they will get home. They struggle to breathe in the smoke filled room as the clock counts down.

Jude and June carefully leave the closet, discovering that they are home, and their friends have been searching for them all night. Unbeknownst to everyone, Derek has gone inside and entered the closet. Derek is shown in the closet having visions of June and Jude making love, followed by Jude stabbing him in the shoulder. A police officer finds the closet empty, except for the bloody pencil Jude had dropped there. This ironically creates the implication that Jude will once again be suspected to have killed Derek.

== Cast ==
- Travis Tope as Jude
- Haley Ramm as June
- Gary Cole as Mr. Wallace
- Jacinda Barrett as Megan
- Dylan Everett as Kent
- Claire Rankin as Mrs. Brenner
- Gage Munroe as Eric Dragle
- Alex Thorne as Thomas Phares
- Jake Manley as Derek
- Clark Backo as Nell
- Marie Dame as Kent's Mom
- Vinson Tran as David
- Charlotte Lai as Girl #1

== Production ==
In July 2017, Blumhouse Productions started principal photography on Seven in Heaven, with Travis Tope and Haley Ramm starring. In April 2018, the film entered post-production.

== Reception ==
Bloody Disgusting said, "Despite all its issues, Seven In Heaven is a solid film with a beginning, middle and ending – no more, no less. It’s certainly no masterpiece, but it holds the audience’s attention and tells a unique story, light on both horror and sci-fi. Seven In Heaven is fine, and sometimes that’s all a movie needs to be."
