= Viral (2016 film) =

2016 film by Henry Joost and Ariel Schulman

- Theatrical release poster
- Directed by: Henry Joost; Ariel Schulman
- Written by: Christopher Landon; Barbara Marshall
- Produced by: Jason Blum; Sherryl Clark
- Starring: Sofia Black-D'Elia; Lio Tipton (Note: Credited as Analeigh Tipton; Tipton came out as non-binary and changed their name in 2021.); Travis Tope; Colson Baker; Michael Kelly
- Cinematography: Magdalena Górka
- Edited by: Ron Dulin; William Yeh
- Music by: Rob Simonsen
- Production companies: Blumhouse Productions; Busted Shark Productions; IM Global
- Distributed by: Dimension Films; RADiUS-TWC
- Release date: July 29, 2016 (United States)
- Running time: 85 minutes
- Country: United States
- Language: English
- Box office: $551,760

Viral is a 2016 American science fiction horror film directed by Ariel Schulman and Henry Joost and written by Christopher Landon and Barbara Marshall. It stars Sofia Black-D'Elia, Lio Tipton, Travis Tope, Machine Gun Kelly, and Michael Kelly. The film was released on July 29, 2016, in a limited release and through video on demand, by Dimension Films.

== Plot ==
Two high-school sisters, Stacey and Emma, have recently moved to a suburban area in California, where their father will teach high school science. Emma struggles to integrate into the community while Stacey quickly makes new friends and a boyfriend, CJ.

Emma befriends Evan, her neighbor. Stacey and Emma's parents have a strained relationship, and her mother is out of town. Gracie, Emma's new best friend, begins displaying unusual behavior at school, eating constantly and coughing up blood. She collapses outside the school, where Emma and a male student find her in a seizure-like state. While Emma has gone to get help, Gracie vomits blood on the boy.

Newscasts report that a "worm flu" is spreading through the area. Emma's father goes to retrieve their mother from the airport, but they are prevented from returning to their home because the government has ordered a quarantine to be placed on the whole town.

Stacey attends a party and forces Emma to tag along. During the party, Stacey finds CJ having sex with another student, while the boy from earlier appears, now looking very ill, and starts attacking the party goers. He coughs blood on Stacey, but Evan saves Emma from being infected. Stacey soon finds a growth forming at the base of her neck and she becomes ravenously hungry.

The next day, Emma receives a call from their father, who urges them to secure the entire house. That night, they watch as their next door neighbor, Mr. Toomey, fires his flare gun. The military arrives at the house, restrain Mr. Toomey and drag out his infected wife.

Stacey confesses to Emma that the reason why their parents are having problems is because she caught their father with a student and told their mother. She reveals that nobody wanted to tell Emma, afraid she couldn't handle it. Evan suddenly pounds on the door, begging for the girls to let him in. Just after he enters, Bill, Evan's infected and violent father, breaks in. Evan points out that Bill has bad vision, and they use this as an advantage. Stacey shoots Bill, saving Emma, but suddenly experiences her own seizure.

Emma and Evan lock Stacey in the bathroom to hide her from the military. Emma, recalling lessons from her father's science classes, devises a plan to remove Stacey's parasite from her neck. CJ arrives at the house, and Stacey pulls him into the bathroom and begins to devour his arm. Emma and Evan find CJ dead with his arm ripped off and Stacey saying, "It made me do it" while she apologizes tearfully over this. Using drugs, Emma knocks Stacey unconscious and begins to extract the parasite, but Stacey awakes and horrifies them by pulling out the parasite herself.

The next day, local radio announces that the government has ordered an immediate evacuation of the citizens located outside the quarantine zone. Evan and Emma discover that Stacey has left the house with all the food. They pursue her into a house and discover a large group of infected people. They find Stacey, who tells them that she can hear what the infected are saying as the parasite begins to gain full control of her. Emma, having no other choice, shoots her sister. She and Evan escape through the window, barely saving themselves as the military bomb the entire area.

Emma and Evan arrive at the gas station her father called from and find a photo of the family, with a note on the back that says to meet her parents at her uncle's residence in Washington State. Evan takes a vacant car from the station and the two depart for Washington.

== Cast ==
- Sofia Black-D'Elia as Emma Drakeford
- Lio Tipton as Stacey Drakeford
- Travis Tope as Evan Klein
- Colson Baker as CJ
- Michael Kelly as Michael Drakeford
- John Cothran, Jr. as Mr. Toomey
- Stoney Westmoreland as Bill
- Linzie Grey as Gracie Lemay
- Judyann Elder as Mrs. Toomey
- Philip Labes as Gangly Kid
- Brianne Howey as Tara Dannelly

== Production ==
On April 29, 2014, it was announced Lio Tipton had been cast in the lead role of the film, with Ariel Schulman and Henry Joost directing the film, with Jason Blum of Blumhouse Productions producing the film. On May 1, 2014, it was announced Sofia Black-D'Elia had been cast in the role of Emma. On May 14, 2014, it was announced Linzie Grey had been cast in the film as Gracie, Emma's best friend. On May 23, 2014, it was announced Michael Kelly had been cast as Emma's father.

== Release ==
In May 2015, Dimension Films set the film for a February 19, 2016, release date. In January 2016, it was announced the film had been pulled from the schedule. When Filmyard Holdings sold Miramax to beIN Media Group on March 2, 2016, Miramax was no longer the production company of Viral. The film was released on July 29, 2016, through video on demand prior to being released in home-media formats on August 2, 2016. The film has a 53% approval rating on Rotten Tomatoes based on 15 reviews, with an average rating of 4.57/10.
