= Sherryl Clark =

American film producer

Sherryl Clark is an American film producer.

== Filmography ==
Clark has produced the following movies:

- Twisted (2004), co-producer
- Cloverfield (2008), executive
- Morning Glory (2010), executive
- Plush (2013)
- Fathers and Daughters (2015)
- Viral (2016)
- Wish Upon (2017)
- Blackbird (2019)

She is a co-founder of the production group H Collective.
