= United Artists Theatre (Los Angeles) =

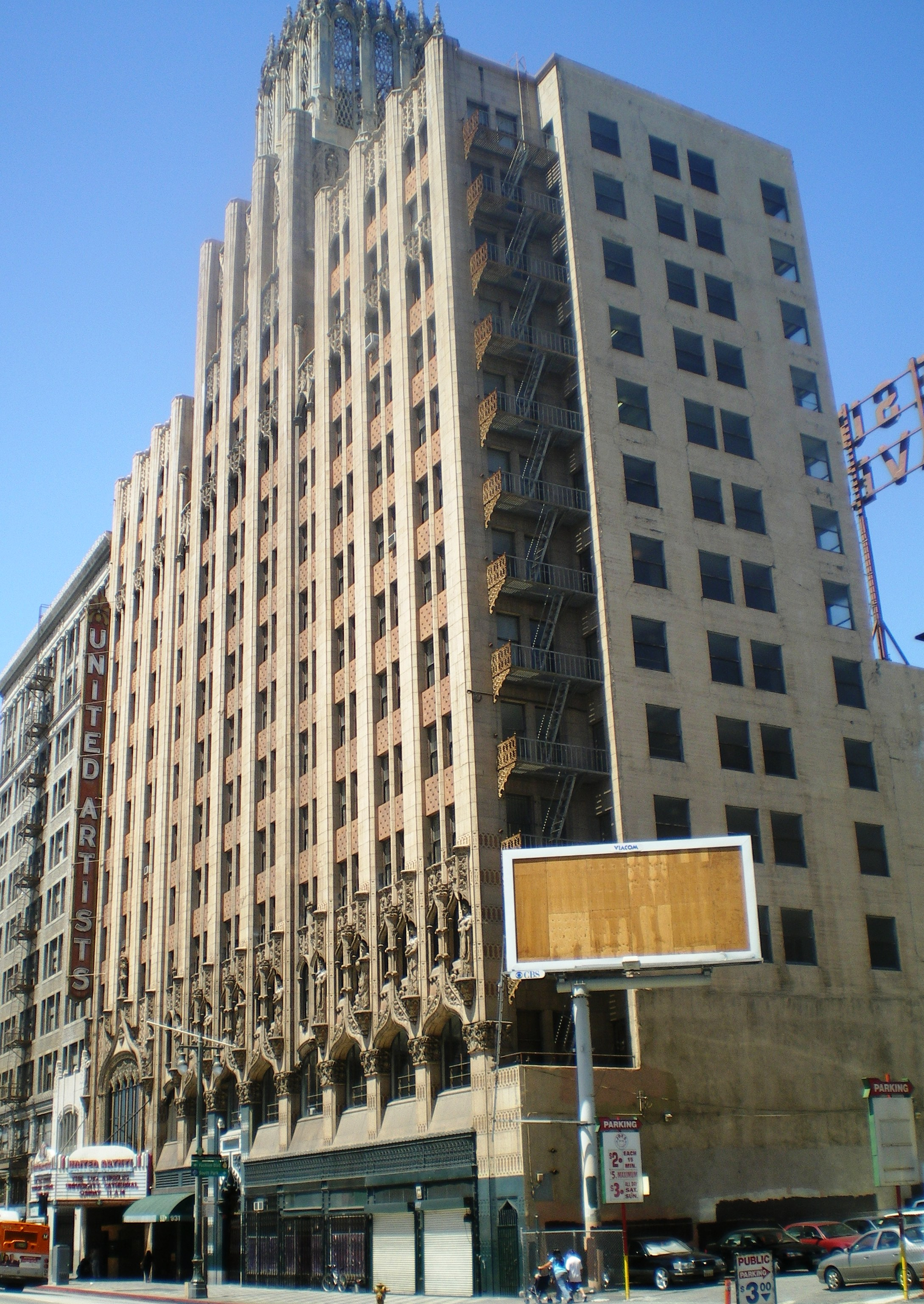
- Exterior of the building (c. 2008)
- Former names: United Artists Theatre (1927–90); University Cathedral (1990–2011); The Ace Hotel Downtown Los Angeles (2014–2024)
- Hotel chain: Kasa

General information
- Status: Completed
- Type: Hotel; Theater
- Location: Downtown Los Angeles, 929 S Broadway; Los Angeles, CA 90015-1609
- Coordinates: 34.0416°N 118.2571°W
- Groundbreaking: March 5, 1927
- Opened: December 26, 1927 (age 98)
- Renovated: 2012–14
- Cost: $3 million ($55.6 million in 2025 dollars)

Height
- Roof: 73.76 m (242.0 ft)

Technical details
- Floor count: 13

Design and construction
- Architects: Walker & Eisen; Charles Howard Crane
- Structural engineer: Scofield Engineering Construction

Other information
- Seating capacity: 1,600 (The United Theater on Broadway)
- Number of rooms: 182
- Number of restaurants: 1 (The Coffeebar)
- Number of bars: 1 (Sauced Wine Bar)
- Facilities: The United Theater on Broadway

Site notes
- Architectural style: Spanish Gothic

Los Angeles Historic-Cultural Monument
- Official name: United Artists Theater Building
- Designated: March 20, 1991
- Reference no.: 523

U.S. National Register of Historic Places
- Designated: April 12, 2002
- Part of: Broadway Theater and Commercial District 2002 expansion
- Reference no.: 02000330

United Artists Theatre is a historic former movie palace and office building located at 937 South Broadway in downtown Los Angeles, California. Its style is Spanish Gothic, patterned after Segovia Cathedral in Segovia, Spain. The office space was converted into a limited-service boutique hotel in the 21st century, previously operated by Ace Hotels and by Kasa since 2024.

== Theater ==
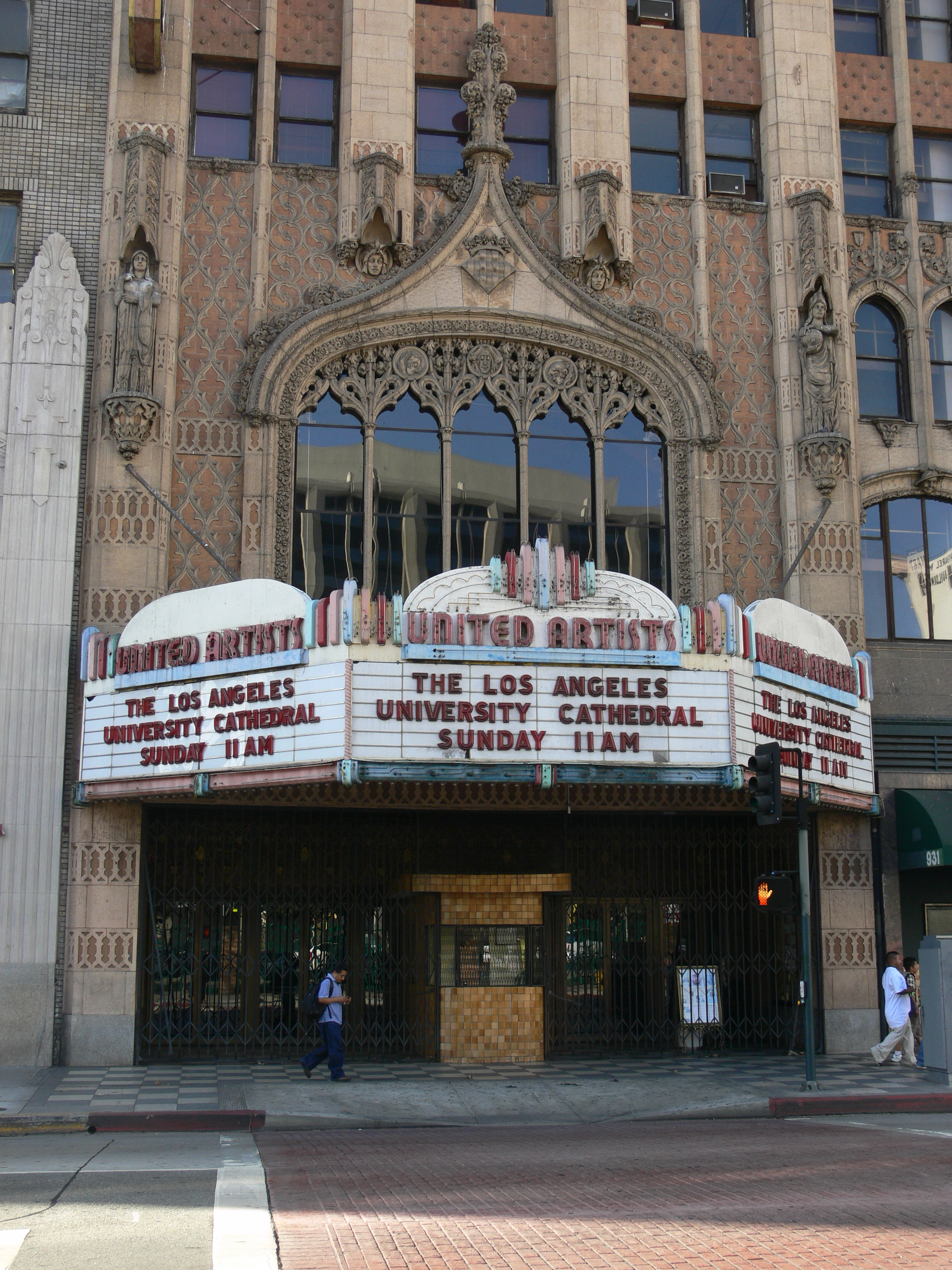
Cinema-theatre-church marquee and entrance

=== United Artists Theatre (1927–1990) ===
The theater was designed by the architect C. Howard Crane of the firm Walker & Eisen for the United Artists film studio formed by D. W. Griffith, Charlie Chaplin, Douglas Fairbanks and Mary Pickford. The theater, a classic movie palace, was one of many constructed by United Artists and served as a major premier house. The theater occupies three floors of the 13-story building and has a 2,214-seat auditorium. Like many movie theaters, the seat rows sink in toward the front of the orchestra section, so ticket holders there must look up at the stage.

=== University Cathedral (1990–2011) ===
The United Artists Theatre was first leased by televangelist Gene Scott in 1989, to be used as the location from which to broadcast the live Sunday services of his ministry. Scott held his first Sunday service there in 1990 and continued to hold Sunday services there until his death in 2005. A designated historic monument in itself, the building was for many years topped by the historic "Jesus Saves" neon signs (originally from the Church of the Open Door). They were located in the rear lower roof, one facing the west and one north, until September 10, 2011, when one sign was removed by crane. The building was claimed to house the largest collection of Bibles in private hands. After leasing for thirteen years, Gene Scott purchased the building in 2002. Following Scott's death, services continued to be held at the Los Angeles University Cathedral by Melissa Scott, the widow of Gene Scott, with services broadcast over TV, shortwave radio, and the Internet. In October 2011, Scott's Wescott Christian Center Inc. sold the building to Greenfield Partners, a real estate investment company located in Westport, Connecticut, for $11 million.

=== The Theatre at Ace Hotel (2014–2024) ===
The theater was restored and re-opened on February 14, 2014 as the Theatre at the Ace Hotel, with concerts by the British rock band Spiritualized. L.A. Dance Project, a dance company founded by choreographer Benjamin Millepied, also took residence in the theater. On April 19, 2014, Quentin Tarantino held a staged reading of a leaked early draft of The Hateful Eight (2015) at the theatre. Red Hot Chili Peppers performed a fundraiser at the Ace Hotel on February 5, 2016, in support of presidential candidate Bernie Sanders.

=== The United Theater on Broadway (2024–present) ===
In 2024, the theater rebranded once again as The United Theater on Broadway.

== Hotel ==
=== Ace Hotel Downtown Los Angeles (2014–2024) ===
The building was completely restored and renovated to serve as a luxury boutique hotel called Ace Hotel Downtown Los Angeles. It featured 182 rooms, a pool, a restaurant and three bars, as well as the restored theater. It opened on January 16, 2014. In December 2014, Greenfield Partners put the building up for sale, seeking about $100 million as the sale price. In May 2015, Chesapeake Lodging Trust bought the building for $103 million.

The hotel closed on January 31, 2024.

=== STILE Downtown Los Angeles by Kasa (2024–present) ===
The hotel reopened in February 2024, managed by Kasa Living, Inc. as STILE Downtown Los Angeles by Kasa. STILE Downtown Los Angeles by Kasa is a limited-service, rooms-only hotel, managed via a tech platform, without any food and beverage establishments.

== Historic designation ==
The building was not listed in the National Register of Historic Places's Broadway Theater and Commercial District when it was first created in 1979, but it was included when the district was expanded in 2002. The building was also listed as Los Angeles Historic-Cultural Monument No. 523 in 1991.

== See also ==
- Broadway Theater District (Los Angeles) — NRHP Historic district
- List of contributing properties in the Broadway Theater and Commercial District
- List of Los Angeles Historic-Cultural Monuments in Downtown Los Angeles
