= Sofia Black-D'Elia =

American actress (born 1991)

- Black-D'Elia in 2026
- Born: December 24, 1991 (age 34); Clifton, New Jersey, U.S.
- Occupation: Actress
- Years active: 2009–present
- Spouse: Henry Joost (m. 2021)
- Children: 1

Sofia Black-D'Elia (born December 24, 1991) is an American actress. She is known for her television roles, such as Tea Marvelli in Skins, Sage Spence in Gossip Girl, Andrea Cornish in The Night Of, and Frannie Latimer in Your Honor. From 2017 to 2018 Black-D'Elia starred as Sabrina on the Fox comedy The Mick. She also starred in the 2015 film Project Almanac and the 2016 film Viral. From 2022–2023, Black-D'Elia played the lead role in the Freeform comedy series Single Drunk Female.

== Early life ==
Black-D'Elia was born and raised in Clifton, New Jersey, where she graduated from Clifton High School. Her mother, Elinor, works in printing. Her father, Anthony V. D'Elia, is a judge of the New Jersey Superior Court. Her father is of Italian descent and her mother is Jewish. Black-D'Elia had a bat mitzvah ceremony. She started acting at the age of five and signed up for dancing classes at Broadway Bound. She is not related to actor and comedian Chris D’Elia, although they have identical surnames.

== Career ==
Black-D'Elia's first significant role was the recurring character Bailey on the soap opera All My Children at age seventeen. In 2010, she joined the cast of the MTV teen drama Skins as Tea, an openly lesbian teenager. In the fall of 2012, Black-D'Elia played the role of Sage Spence in the sixth and final season of Gossip Girl. Black-Delia starred in the Michael Bay–produced time travel thriller Project Almanac, which was released in January 2015. In 2016, she appeared in the HBO miniseries The Night Of. The same year she starred as Emma in the horror film Viral.

Black-D'Elia played Sabrina Pemberton on Fox comedy television comedy series The Mick from 2017 to 2018. In 2019 she was in the role of Frannie on the Showtime legal drama television series Your Honor, which premiered in late 2020. She starred in the Freeform comedy series Single Drunk Female for two seasons.

== Personal life ==
Black-D'Elia lives in New York City. Black-D'Elia met filmmaker Henry Joost while working on the 2016 film Viral, which he co-directed. They married in October 2021.

== Filmography ==
Key
†	Denotes films that have not yet been released

Film roles
Year	Title	Role	Notes
2013	The Immigrant	Not Magda	
2014	Born of War	Mina	
2015	Project Almanac	Jessie Pierce	
2016	Viral	Emma Drakeford	
2016	Ben-Hur	Tirzah	
2021	To All the Boys: Always and Forever	Heather	
2023	Good Burger 2	Maria	
2024	I Love You Forever	Mackenzie	
2026	Remarkably Bright Creatures	Avery	
2026	Never Change!	Katie Cartwright	

Television roles
Year	Title	Role	Notes
2009–2010	All My Children	Bailey Wells	Recurring role
2011	Skins	Tea Marvelli	Main cast
2012	Gossip Girl	Natasha "Sage" Spence	Recurring role (season 6)
2013	Betrayal	Jules Whitman	Recurring role
2015	The Messengers	Erin Calder	Main cast
2016	The Night Of	Andrea Cornish	Episode: "The Beach"
2017–2018	The Mick	Sabrina Pemberton	Main cast
2020–2021	Your Honor	Frannie Latimer	Main cast (season 1)
2022–2023	Single Drunk Female	Samantha Fink	Title role
2025	Deli Boys	Gigi Lozano	Episode: "Jersey Boys"

Web roles
Year	Title	Role	Notes
2011	Skins Webisodes	Tea Marvelli	Episodes: "Dress Up", "Poker", "The Big Bust Hunt"
2012	Somewhere Road	Erika	Short film
2016	10 Crosby	Sofia / Ronnie's Mom	Short film series; segments: "Hi Fi", "Drunk on Youth"
2016	Invisible	Tatiana Ashland	Main role

Music videos
Year	Title	Artist	Notes
2011	"The Chase Is On"	Hoodie Allen	
2013	"If So"	Atlas Genius	
