= The Princess Bride (musical) =

Stage adaptation of the novel and film

- Music: Kristen Anderson-Lopez; Robert Lopez
- Lyrics: Kristen Anderson-Lopez; Robert Lopez
- Book: Bob Martin; Rick Elice
- Basis: The Princess Bride (novel) by William Goldman; The Princess Bride (film) by William Goldman
- Productions: 2027 Chicago

The Princess Bride is an upcoming musical with music and lyrics by Kristen Anderson-Lopez and Robert Lopez and a book by Bob Martin and Rick Elice, based on the 1973 novel and 1987 film of the same name by William Goldman. It is expected to premiere at the James M. Nederlander Theatre in Chicago, in July 2027.

== Production history ==
=== World premiere: Chicago (2027) ===
The musical will have its world premiere at the James M. Nederlander Theatre, Chicago from July 19 to August 22, 2027. It will be directed by Alex Timbers and choreographed by Andy Blankenbuehler.
