= Princess Bride Reunion =

Virtual event

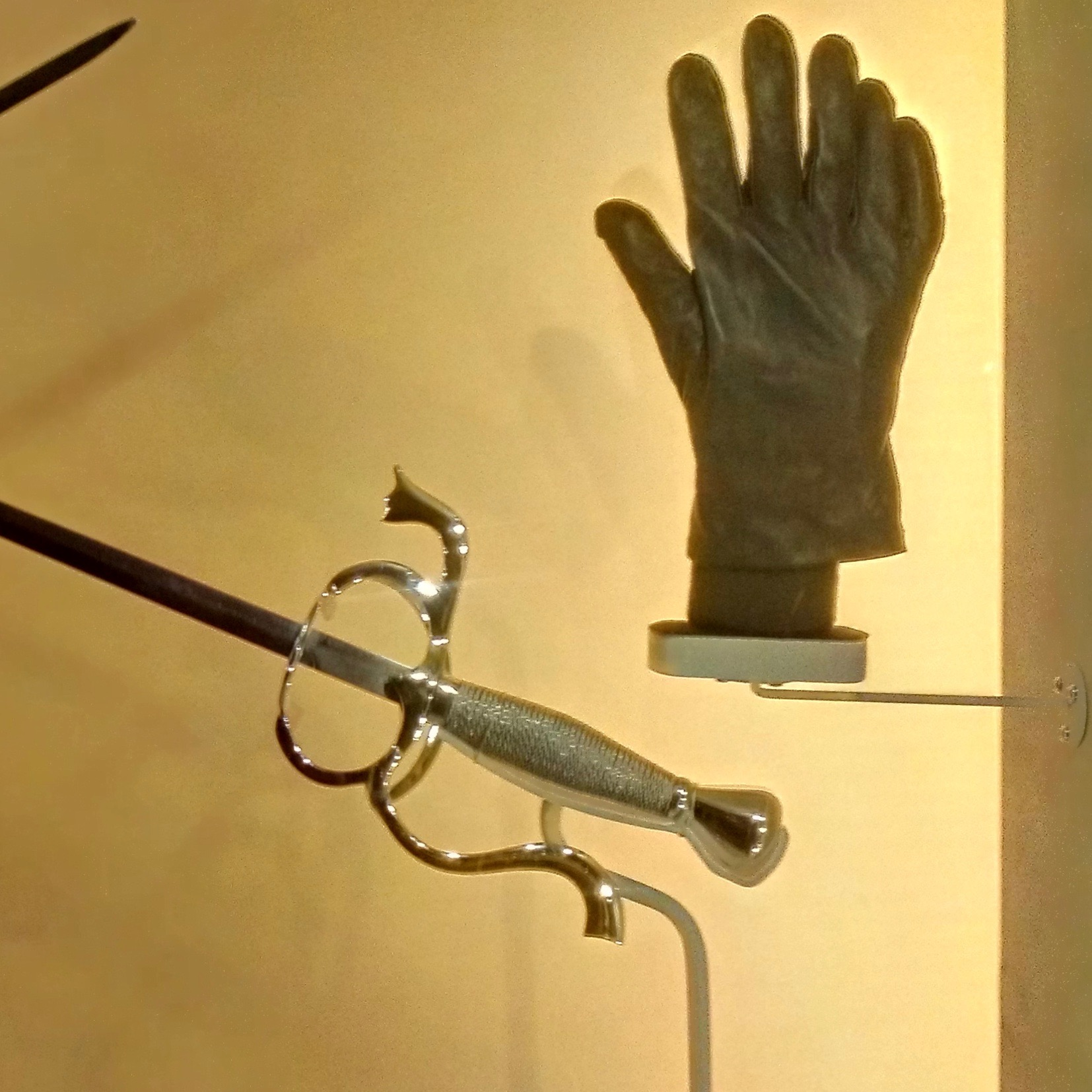
Six-fingered glove with Inigo Montoya's sword from the 1987 film The Princess Bride, which Mandy Patinkin used for his 2020 performance in Princess Bride Reunion, on display at The Museum of Pop Culture in Seattle, Washington

On September 13, 2020, most of the original cast members of the 1987 film The Princess Bride took part in a virtual live dramatic reading of the film script to support Wisconsin Democrats. The returning cast included Cary Elwes, Robin Wright, Mandy Patinkin, Chris Sarandon, Christopher Guest, Wallace Shawn, Billy Crystal, and Carol Kane, with additional performances by Rob Reiner as the Grandfather, Josh Gad as Fezzik, Eric Idle as the Impressive Clergyman, Whoopi Goldberg as the Ancient Booer and the Mother, and Jason Reitman as the narrator, among others. Norman Lear joined the Q&A session at the end, which was hosted by Patton Oswalt. Cast members promoted the event beforehand using the hashtags "#PrincessBrideReunion" and "#DumpTrumperdinck." More than 110,000 viewers donated a dollar or more to Wisconsin Democrats to view the livestream, which raised $4.25 million and received widely positive reviews, with special praise for Patinkin's performance.

== Origin of event ==
The idea to recruit Princess Bride cast members for a fundraiser was inspired by a benefit event organized by Wisconsin Democrats that reunited cast members of The West Wing. According to the Hollywood Reporter, Cary Elwes (Westley in the film) approached a friend who knew Ben Wikler, chair of the Democratic Party of Wisconsin to ask if he could help raise money for the battleground state. Wisconsin Democrats and others promoted the virtual script reading with digital ads and social media. Elwes began teasing the event in his Twitter feed in early September 2020, announcing it openly on September 4:

#Inconceivable! I'm excited to announce a virtual #PrincessBrideReunion! Chip in any amount at the link & get an invite to this special event on Sun. Sept. 13th with myself, @RealRobinWright, @PatinkinMandy, @robreiner & many more! #DumpTrumperdinck.

Wisconsin was considered an important "swing state" in the 2020 U.S. presidential election. In 2016, Donald Trump won the state, despite consistent polls that showed Hillary Clinton ahead. The police shooting of Jacob Blake in August 2020, followed by the fatal shooting of two protestors, also created political tension in Wisconsin.

Senator Ted Cruz, responding to the event announcement on Twitter, said that he wished the Princess Bride movie, which he called "perfect," would stay out of "Hollywood politics". Widespread news coverage of Cruz's criticism, and of pushback from the cast, "led to a surge of publicity," according to The New Yorker.

== Cast ==
Although most of the original actors volunteered for the fundraiser, Deadline Hollywood announced on September 9 that there would be several replacements and additions. The replacements included Whoopi Goldberg (playing more than one part), Eric Idle (playing The Impressive Clergyman), and Josh Gad (playing Fezzik). Grandpa and The Narrator, two roles originated by Peter Falk (who died in 2011) were taken by Rob Reiner and Jason Reitman. Norman Lear joined the Q&A session at the end, which was hosted by Patton Oswalt. Fred Savage was unable to join the event because it conflicted with his brother's birthday.

The 2020 event featured:

=== Framing story ===
- Jason Reitman as The Narrator (played by Peter Falk in the movie)
- Rob Reiner as Grandpa (played by Peter Falk in the movie)
- Finn Wolfhard as The Grandson (played by Fred Savage in the movie)
- Whoopi Goldberg as The Mother (played by Betsy Brantley in the movie)

=== Main story ===
- Cary Elwes as Westley/Dread Pirate Roberts/The Man in Black
- Robin Wright as Buttercup/The Princess Bride
- Mandy Patinkin as Inigo Montoya
- Chris Sarandon as Prince Humperdinck
- Christopher Guest as Count Tyrone Rugen
- Wallace Shawn as Vizzini
- Josh Gad as Fezzik (played by André the Giant in the movie)
- Billy Crystal as Miracle Max
- Carol Kane as Valerie, Max's wife
- Eric Idle as The Impressive Clergyman (played by Peter Cook in the movie)
- Shaun Ross as The Man With Albinism (played by Mel Smith in the movie)
- Whoopi Goldberg as The Ancient Booer (played by Margery Mason in the movie)
- King Bach as Yellin, a soldier of Florin (played by Malcolm Storry in the movie)

=== Additions to the original ===
- Patton Oswalt served as MC and hosted the Q&A session afterward.
- Ben Wikler spoke on behalf of Wisconsin Democrats.

== Performance ==
After some technical problems that delayed the performance, Wisconsin Democratic Party Chairman Ben Wikler thanked the audience for supporting Democrats. Although 2020 polling showed Joe Biden ahead of Donald Trump in Wisconsin, Wikler noted that Trump won Wisconsin in 2016 despite trailing in polls throughout that campaign.

To set the scene, Jason Reitman read the screenplay's stage directions in addition to reading the role of The Narrator. A few performers had transient audio problems, and King Bach did not appear due to technical problems. Finn Wolfhard read Bach's parts, as well as The Grandson. The actors were filmed individually in their homes, as was common in 2020 due to Coronavirus. Most wore ordinary street clothing and read without props, although Mandy Patinkin and Billy Crystal used some of their props from the film.

After the readthrough, Patton Oswalt moderated a Q&A session with questions from the online audience. Norman Lear, the film's producer, said there were no plans to remake the movie but that he hoped to see a musical version some day.

== Reception and aftermath ==
Though live and not perfect, the table-reading received positive reviews. The A.V. Club mentioned "the obvious love and enthusiasm with which every member of the cast, original or otherwise, brought to this event," but singled out Mandy Patinkin for special praise. Listing "11 delights" from the event, they mentioned Josh Gad's "surprisingly moving Andre the Giant tribute," Billy Crystal's homemade "Miracle Max" set, and "basically everything involving Mandy Patinkin."

According to Rolling Stone, "highlights included Elwes donning a medical mask for the line 'It's just that masks are terribly comfortable—I think everyone will be wearing them in the future' and Patinkin's entire performance."

The New Yorker also singled out Patinkin, and his dramatic introduction of Inigo Montoya's six-fingered sword:

...he threw himself into his old role with a passion that seemed to sear the lens of his Webcam. He roared, he wept, he danced; he rolled his 'R's and sharpened his 'E's; he even came in costume—a white shirt, rakishly unbuttoned to mid-chest. At the moment of the story's first marvelous duel, when Montoya introduces his sword, Patinkin presented—to considerable excitement in my household (and on Twitter, where my feed was briefly overwhelmed by exclamation marks and the word "sword")—an actual prop sword from the film itself.

Entertainment Weekly noted many viewer comments on the "Miracle Max" background Billy Crystal had created (he also wore his original hat from the film.) They also enjoyed the Q&A session, including the cast's memories of Andre the Giant.

More than 110,000 listeners donated $1 or more to be able to tune in to the event, which raised $4.25 million for Wisconsin Democrats. On September 18, the Associated Press updated earlier numbers to say that more than 142,000 viewers made donations, bringing the amount raised to $4.26 million. Wikler said of the event that it was the biggest grassroots fundraiser the party has ever held.

Trump campaign spokespeople, however, said that the online event would not help Biden win Wisconsin. Trump's spokeswoman Anna Kelly said, "Unlike the movie, we know what inconceivable means, and a Biden victory in Wisconsin is simply inconceivable". Mr Biden would go on to win the state by 20,697 votes, according to the final ballot count.

Elwes, being interviewed on Morning Joe on September 17, said that following the success of the reunion other battleground states approached him about doing table reads of other classic movies. By October 31, according to The Washington Post, the Princess Bride table-read

propelled an unprecedented run of virtual cast reunions...The flurry of Democratic fundraising cast reunions and readings in recent months has included Veep, Seinfeld, Parks and Recreation, Happy Days and Superbad...

A recording of the live performance can be accessed using a passcode, in exchange for a donation to Wisconsin Democrats.
