= Josh Gad =

American actor and singer (born 1981)

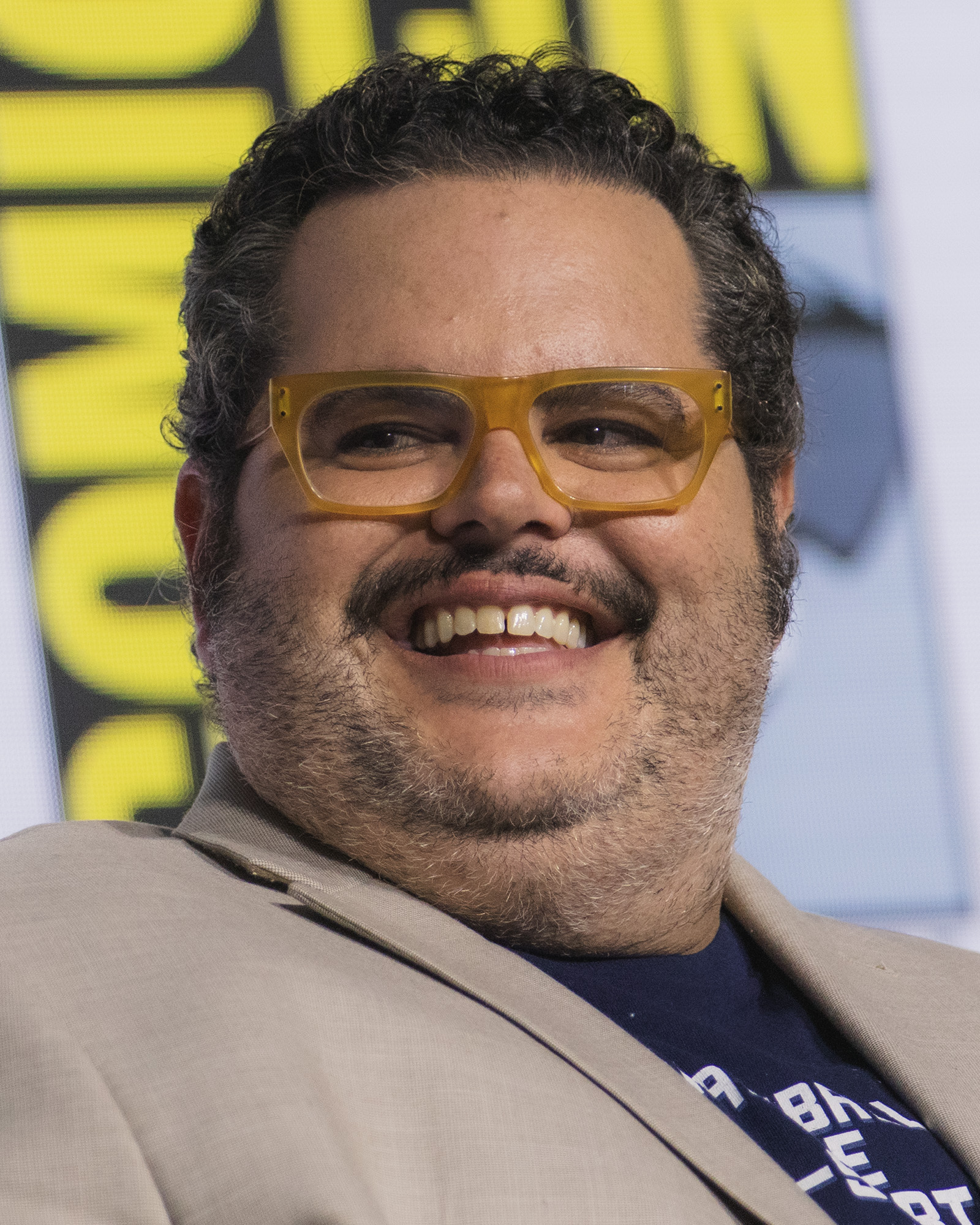
- Gad in 2026
- Born: Joshua Ilan Gad; February 23, 1981 (age 45); Hollywood, Florida, U.S.
- Education: Carnegie Mellon University (BFA)
- Occupations: Actor; singer; comedian
- Years active: 2002–present
- Spouse: Ida Darvish (m. 2008)
- Children: 2

Joshua Ilan Gad (born February 23, 1981) is an American actor, singer and comedian. Known for his roles on stage and screen, he has received a Grammy Award as well as a nomination for a Tony Award. He was honored with the Disney Legend Award in 2022.

Gad gained prominence for his starring role acting opposite Andrew Rannells in the Broadway musical comedy The Book of Mormon (2011–2012) for which he won the Grammy Award for Best Musical Theater Album as well as a nomination for the Tony Award for Best Leading Actor in a Musical. He returned to Broadway reuniting with Rannells in another musical comedy Gutenberg! The Musical! (2023–2024). He has also acted in productions of the musicals The 25th Annual Putnam County Spelling Bee (2006) and Jesus Christ Superstar (2025).

He has acted in comedy films such as Love & Other Drugs (2010), Thanks for Sharing (2012), The Internship (2013), The Wedding Ringer (2015), Pixels (2015) as well as dramatic roles in 21 (2008), Jobs (2013), Marshall (2017) and Murder on the Orient Express (2017). He portrayed LeFou in Beauty and the Beast (2017) and voiced Olaf in the Frozen franchise (2013–) and Chuck in The Angry Birds Movie franchise (2016–).

On television, he was a correspondent on the Comedy Central political variety series The Daily Show with Jon Stewart from 2009 to 2011 before co-creating, producing, and starring in the NBC sitcom 1600 Penn (2012–2013). He has had main roles in the FX sitcom The Comedians (2015) and the HBO comedy series Avenue 5 (2020–2022) as well as recurring roles on Modern Family (2011, 2020) and New Girl (2012–2015).

== Early life and education ==
Joshua Ilan Gad was born in Hollywood, Florida, on February 23, 1981. His mother, Susan, is a real estate agent and his stepfather is an investment advisor. Gad has two older brothers, a stepbrother, and a stepsister. His father, Sam (Shmuel) Gad, was born to a Jewish family in Afghanistan and moved to Israel as a teenager. Gad believes his father is a descendant of the Tribe of Gad, one of the Ten Lost Tribes of Israel, further stating that his paternal ancestors traveled through India before settling in Afghanistan. His mother was born in Germany to an Ashkenazi Jewish family of Holocaust survivors. Gad was raised Jewish.

Gad attended high school at the University School of Nova Southeastern University, graduating in 1999. As a student there, he won the National Forensics League National Tournament Championships for Original Oratory in 1998 and 1999. He also won the 1999 Humorous Interpretation at the National tournament in Phoenix. He attended the Carnegie Mellon College of Fine Arts, where he graduated in 2003 with a Bachelor of Fine Arts in drama. He attended college with fellow Broadway stars Leslie Odom Jr. and Rory O'Malley, the latter of whom he based his portrayal of Olaf in Frozen on. During this time, he undertook a semester-long exchange at the National Institute of Dramatic Art.

== Career ==
=== 2002–2008: Early career ===
Gad made his film debut in the 2002 film Mary and Joe. His television debut was in 2005 in an episode of the NBC medical drama series ER. The same year, he replaced Dan Fogler as William Barfée in The 25th Annual Putnam County Spelling Bee on Broadway after Fogler left the show. Gad went on to star in the Fox sitcom Back to You as news director Ryan Church. The sitcom lasted one season from 2007 to 2008. In 2008, Gad had a supporting role in the drama film 21, and a leading role in the comedy film The Rocker.

=== 2008–2012: Breakthrough with The Book of Mormon ===
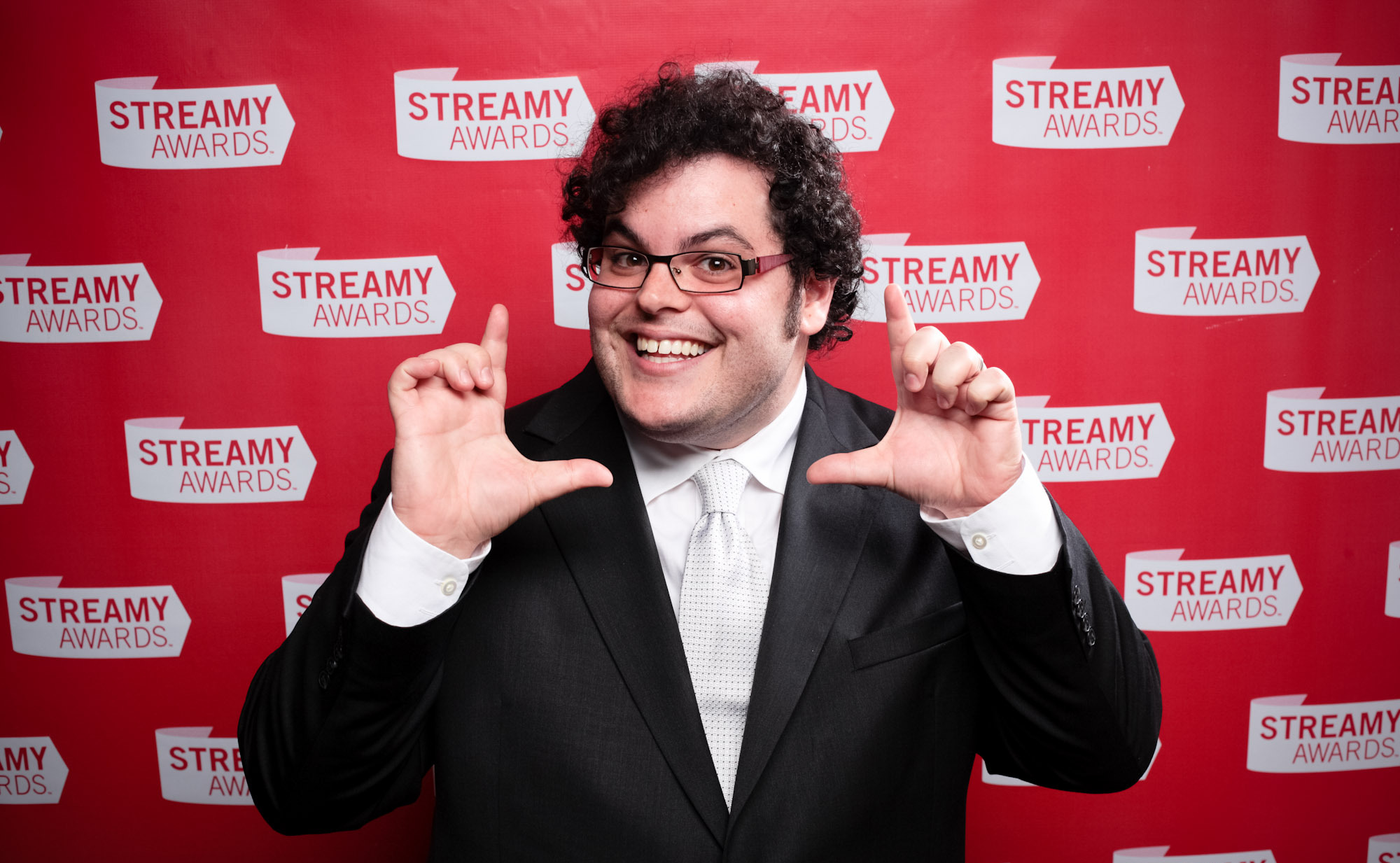
Gad at the 2010 Streamy Awards

After Back to You, Gad appeared as a correspondent on The Daily Show on May 5, 2009, and became a regular correspondent on June 2, 2009. His signature segments include "The War on Christmas", in which he played an oversexed Benjamin Franklin, and "Chubby Chasers", in which he reported on Michelle Obama's efforts to curb childhood obesity. Gad made his final appearance as a correspondent on June 27, 2011. Also in 2009, Gad starred in the short-form Crackle horror comedy series Woke Up Dead.

In 2010, he had a supporting role in the romantic comedy-drama film Love & Other Drugs. That same year, Gad had a voice role in the family comedy film Marmaduke. In 2011, Gad voiced Mondo in the MTV adult animated sitcom Good Vibes. That same year, Gad portrayed Elder Cunningham in the Broadway musical The Book of Mormon. The show opened at the Eugene O'Neill Theatre on March 24, 2011. His last performance was June 6, 2012. Gad was nominated for the 2011 Tony Award for Best Leading Actor in a Musical and won for Grammy Award for Best Musical Theater Album, along with his costar Andrew Rannells.

In 2012, Gad had a leading role in the independent film She Wants Me. Also in 2012, Gad co-created, produced and starred in the NBC sitcom 1600 Penn. Both Good Vibes and 1600 Penn were canceled after one season. That same year, Gad voiced the molehog Louis in Ice Age: Continental Drift.

=== 2013–2019: Frozen franchise and stardom ===
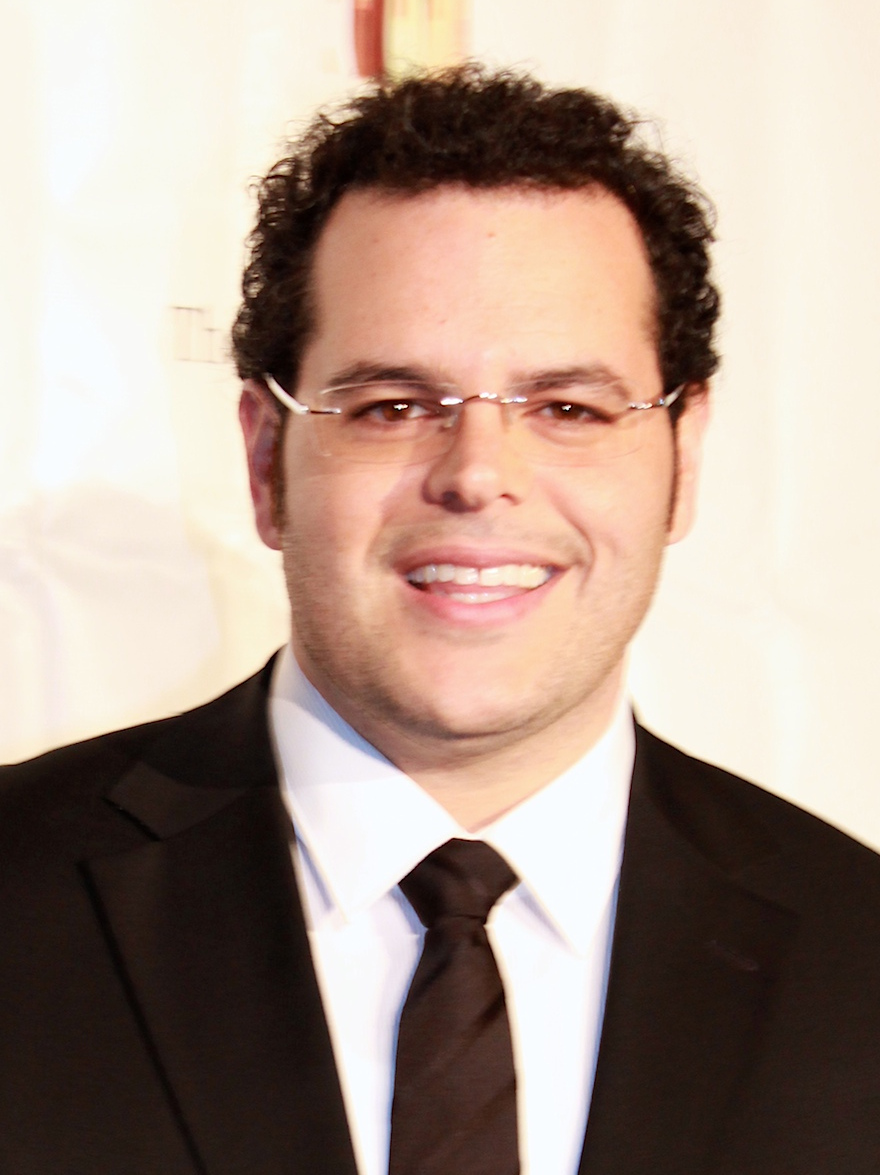
Gad at the 2014 Annie Awards

In 2013, he played Andrew in the film The Internship and starred as Steve Wozniak in the film Jobs. The same year, he voiced Olaf in the Disney film Frozen, re-collaborating with co-songwriter Robert Lopez from The Book of Mormon. In 2014, Gad costarred in Zach Braff's film Wish I Was Here, playing the main character's brother.

In 2015, Gad starred in The Wedding Ringer and starred in Pixels, a film about video game players who are recruited by the military to fight 1980s-era video game characters who have attack the Earth. That same year, Gad costarred with Billy Crystal on the FX comedy series The Comedians, which premiered on April 9, 2015. The series was canceled after one season. In 2016, Gad voiced Chuck in The Angry Birds Movie, based on the game franchise of the same name.

In 2017, Gad voiced the dog Bailey in A Dog's Purpose. Also that year, he played LeFou in the live-action adaptation of Disney's Beauty and the Beast, directed by Bill Condon and costarring with Emma Watson. Gad also starred in Reginald Hudlin's biographical drama Marshall, and Beauty and the Beast costar Dan Stevens, and Gad played Hector MacQueen in a film adaptation of Agatha Christie's detective novel Murder on the Orient Express, directed by and starring Kenneth Branagh.

In 2019, Gad starred in the Hulu horror-comedy Little Monsters. He also starred in A Dog's Journey, the sequel to A Dog's Purpose, reprising his role as Bailey. Also in 2019, Gad reprised his role of Olaf in the sequel Frozen 2 as well as the video game Kingdom Hearts III.

=== 2020–present: Expanding ventures ===
In 2020, Gad returned to television by starring in two different television series. First, Gad starred in the HBO science fiction comedy series Avenue 5. The series premiered on January 19 and was renewed for a second season a month later. Second, Gad created, produced and starred in the Apple TV+ animated musical comedy series Central Park. The series received a two-season order from Apple with each season set to consist of thirteen episodes each. The series premiered on May 29.

He starred in the science fantasy adventure Artemis Fowl (2020), based on the book of the same name by Eoin Colfer. The film was initially set for a theatrical release but was changed to a streaming release on Disney+ due to the coronavirus pandemic. In September 2020 Gad joined Princess Bride Reunion, a virtual live script read-through of the 1987 film, in the role of Fezzik, originally played by André the Giant. The A.V. Club's review singled out his performance as "Josh Gad’s surprisingly moving Andre the Giant tribute... It was an impression in the gentlest, sweetest sense of the word, something remarked on repeatedly by the rest of the cast and host/moderator Patton Oswalt. 10s across the board."

During the COVID-19 pandemic, where people were encouraged to practice social distancing, Gad launched the YouTube series Reunited Apart, which reunites the cast, via video conferencing, of several popular film and film series including Back to the Future and The Lord of the Rings. The series encourages its viewers to support non-profit charities such as Dig Deep, Project Hope, and No Kid Hungry. In June, Gad announced that the episode on Ferris Bueller's Day Off would be the last, though the series later returned for a second season, which premiered in December 2020 with the cast of Wayne's World.

In the runup to the 2020 election, Gad joined other Broadway celebrities with the voter education nonprofit VoteRiders for a virtual party to raise awareness around the complexities of voter ID laws targeting at-risk voters.

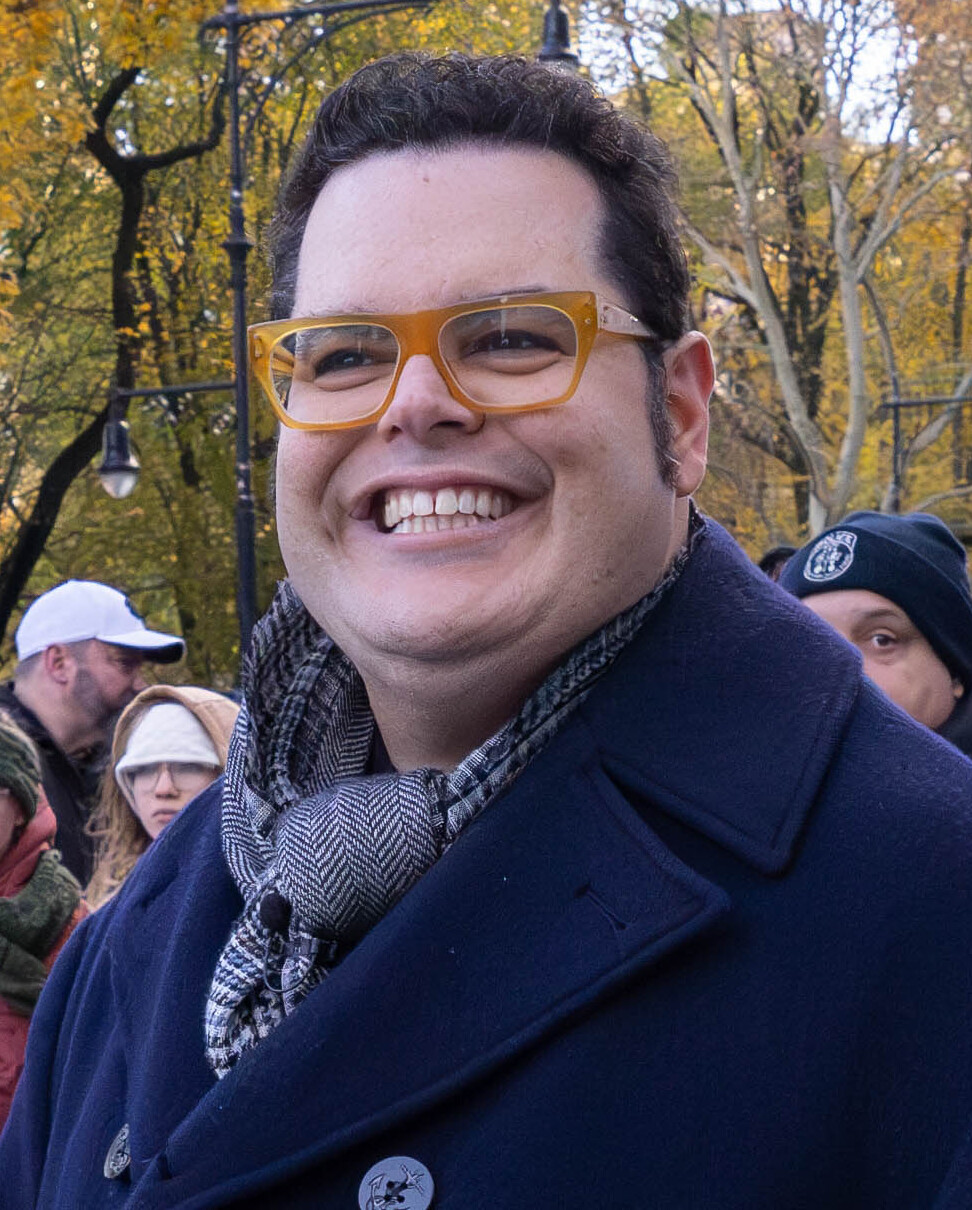
Gad in 2023

In the TV series Wolf Like Me (2022–2023), Gad plays Gary, a widowed father, raising his troubled 11-year-old daughter and the healing journey that ensues when a mysterious woman struggling with lycanthropy enters their lives. He was set to serve as co-creator, co-writer, and executive producer for a Beauty and the Beast prequel limited series for Disney+, in which he would reprise his role as LeFou as a series regular. However, the series was postponed indefinitely in February 2022 due to creative and scheduling issues. Gad was announced to star as Nick Szalinski in the upcoming film Shrunk, a legacy-sequel to Honey, I Shrunk the Kids.

From September 2023 to January 2024, he starred in Gutenberg! The Musical! with Andrew Rannells. The cast recording with the two released on May 3, 2024 digitally and physically on May 17, 2024. Gad will make his debut as director with a biopic about Chris Farley with Paul Walter Hauser playing the lead role. Published by Dark Horse Comics in June 2024, Gad co-wrote alongside Ben and Max Berkowitz (Berkowitz Bros.) a four-issue comic book mini series, called The Writer, with interior art by Ariel Olivetti. The comic book series is inspired by Jewish folklore. Gad announced that he will be debuting his picture book called PictureFace Lizzy in fall of 2024. Gad's Frozen costar, Kristen Bell, has been announced to be narrating PictureFace Lizzy. Gad announced he will be publishing a memoir in 2025 called In Gad We Trust. He is set to star in Spaceballs: The New One, which is being produced by himself and Mel Brooks.

In early July 2025, was announced that Gad had joined the regional production of Jesus Christ Superstar at the Hollywood Bowl as King Herod. However he had announced his withdrawal from the production later that month due to a COVID-19 infection, only to return for the final showing. He had a voice cameo as a mole named Paul Moldebrandt in Zootopia 2, released in 2025. In January 2026, Gad appeared as "a spoofed hyper-famous version of himself" in the Marvel Cinematic Universe TV series Wonder Man.

== Personal life ==
In 2004, Gad met actress Ida Darvish after the two were cast to play a married couple in the David Ives play All in the Timing. They married in 2008. They have two daughters. He is godfather to both of Bryce Dallas Howard's and Seth Gabel's children.

Gad has publicly talked about his struggle with generalized anxiety disorder, as part of his effort to combat mental health stigma and shame. As an effort towards quashing the mental health stigma, Gad joined other celebrities in 2018 in an ongoing project through the Child Mind Institute, titled #MyYoungerSelf. This campaign focuses on normalizing mental health, especially in kids. The website features Gad and other celebrities talking about their own personal struggles with mental health and how they've found the help they need, while they also encourage viewers to find what can specifically help them. Gad's YouTube series Reunited Apart helped him get through the pandemic and sheltering at home. While he was out of work for the duration of the pandemic, he was able to focus on the series and not let his mental health decline.

Gad has stated that while he loves the traditional aspects of Judaism and celebrates some traditions of his wife's Catholicism, he considers himself spiritual but not religious.

== Filmography ==
=== Film ===
| Year | Title | Role | Notes |
|---|---|---|---|
| 2002 | Mary and Joe | Angel | |
| 2003 | BAQ-132 | Match factory engineer | |
| 2006 | Razortooth | Jay Wells | |
| 2007 | Watching the Detectives | Mark | |
| 2008 | 21 | Miles | |
| 2008 | The Rocker | Matt | |
| 2009 | Crossing Over | Howie | |
| 2009 | No Heroics | Horseforce | Television film |
| 2009 | Waiting to Die | Simon | Television film |
| 2009 | The Lost Nomads: Get Lost 22 | Gigi / Miss Piggy / Jose Sanchez / The Clown / Spatula Lover | |
| 2009 | Big Guy | Rodney | Short film |
| 2010 | Marmaduke | Bandana Dog | Voice |
| 2010 | Love & Other Drugs | Josh Randall | |
| 2011 | Mardi Gras: Spring Break | Bump (Bartholomew T. Brown) | |
| 2012 | She Wants Me | Sam Baum | |
| 2012 | Ice Age: Continental Drift | Louis | Voice |
| 2012 | Thanks for Sharing | Neil | |
| 2013 | Jobs | Steve Wozniak | |
| 2013 | The Internship | Headphones | |
| 2013 | Frozen | Olaf | Voice |
| 2014 | Wish I Was Here | Noah Bloom | |
| 2015 | The Wedding Ringer | Doug Harris | |
| 2015 | Frozen Fever | Olaf | Voice; short film |
| 2015 | Pixels | Ludlow Lamonsoff | |
| 2016 | The Angry Birds Movie | Chuck | Voice |
| 2017 | A Dog's Purpose | Bailey / Ellie / Tino / Buddy | Voice |
| 2017 | Beauty and the Beast | LeFou | |
| 2017 | Marshall | Sam Friedman | |
| 2017 | Murder on the Orient Express | Hector MacQueen | |
| 2017 | Olaf's Frozen Adventure | Olaf | Voice; short film |
| 2018 | Matangi/Maya/M.I.A. | Himself | Documentary |
| 2019 | Little Monsters | Teddy McGiggle | |
| 2019 | A Dog's Journey | Bailey | Voice |
| 2019 | The Angry Birds Movie 2 | Chuck | Voice |
| 2019 | Frozen 2 | Olaf | Voice |
| 2020 | Artemis Fowl | Mulch Diggums | |
| 2020 | Once Upon a Snowman | Olaf | Voice; short film |
| 2021 | Ghostbusters: Afterlife | Muncher | Voice |
| 2023 | Strays | Gus | Voice |
| 2023 | Once Upon a Studio | Olaf | Voice; short film |
| 2025 | Couples Weekend | Mitch | |
| 2025 | Adulthood | Noah | |
| 2025 | Zootopia 2 | Paul Moldebrandt | Voice Cameo |
| 2026 | Orangutan | Himself | Voice; Documentary |
| 2026 | The Angry Birds Movie 3 † | Chuck | Voice; in production |
| 2027 | Spaceballs: The New One † | TBA | Post-production; also writer and producer |
| 2027 | Untitled Ocean's Eleven prequel † | TBA | Filming |
| 2027 | Frozen 3 † | Olaf | Voice; in production |
| 2028 | Oh, the Places You'll Go! † | Bixby | Voice; in production |

=== Television ===
| Year | Title | Role | Notes |
|---|---|---|---|
| 2005 | ER | Sgt. Bruce Larabee | Episode: "Here and There" |
| 2007–2008 | Back to You | Ryan Church | Main role |
| 2008 | American Dad! | Art | Voice; episode: "Pulling Double Booty" |
| 2008, 2009 | Numbers | Roy McGill | 2 episodes |
| 2009 | Party Down | Jeffrey Ells | Episode: "California College Conservative Union Caucus" |
| 2009–2011 | The Daily Show with Jon Stewart | Himself (correspondent) | 5 episodes |
| 2010 | Bored to Death | Warren | Episode: "Make It Quick, Fitzgerald!" |
| 2011 | The Cleveland Show | Droopy / Pimp | Voice; episode: "Our Gang" |
| 2011 | Californication | Doctor | 2 episodes |
| 2011 | Gigi: Almost American | Gigi | 10 episodes; also executive producer |
| 2011, 2020 | Modern Family | Kenneth Ploufe | 2 episodes: "Punkin Chunkin" and "Dead on a Rival" |
| 2011 | Good Vibes | Mondo | Voice; main role |
| 2012–2013 | 1600 Penn | Skip Gilchrist | Main role; also co-creator and executive producer |
| 2012–2015 | New Girl | Bearclaw | 3 episodes: "Katie", "Birthday", "Walk of Shame" |
| 2013 | Hollywood Game Night | Himself | Episode: "America's Got Game Night" |
| 2014 | Monsters vs. Aliens | Internet | Voice; episode: "Bride of the Internet" |
| 2015 | The Comedians | Josh | Main role |
| 2015 | Sesame Street | Vincent Van Stop | Episode: "Bert's Sign Painting Challenge |
| 2015 | Phineas and Ferb | Wendell | Voice; 2 episodes |
| 2015 | TripTank | Louis | Voice; 1 episode |
| 2015 | Jeopardy! | Himself | Celebrity contestant |
| 2016 | Lip Sync Battle | Himself / Donald Trump | Episode: "Josh Gad vs. Kaley Cuoco" |
| 2016 | Sofia the First | Olaf | Voice; episode: "The Secret Library: Olaf and the Tale of Miss Nettle" |
| 2016 | LEGO Frozen Northern Lights | Olaf | Voice; special |
| 2016 | Talking Dead | Himself | Guest |
| 2017 | Star Wars Rebels | LT-319 | Voice; episode: "Double Agent Droid" |
| 2017 | South Park | Marcus Preston / Ms. McGullicutty | Voice; episode: "Hummels & Heroin"; Also producer |
| 2018 | Bob's Burgers | Damon | Voice; episode: "Just One of the Boyz 4 Now for Now" |
| 2019 | The Ellen DeGeneres Show | Himself | Guest host |
| 2020–2022 | Avenue 5 | Herman Judd | Main cast |
| 2020 | At Home with Olaf | Olaf | Voice; main role |
| 2020–2022 | Central Park | Birdie / Ernst Von Gunten | Voice; main cast; also co-creator, writer and executive producer |
| 2020 | Home Movie: The Princess Bride | Grandson | Episode: "Chapter One: As You Wish" |
| 2021 | Olaf Presents | Olaf | Voice; main role |
| 2021 | Curb Your Enthusiasm | Chiropractor | Episode: "Man Fights Tiny Woman" |
| 2022–2023 | Wolf Like Me | Gary | Main cast |
| 2022 | The Boys | Himself | Episode: "Herogasm"; cameo |
| 2022 | The Tiny Chef Show | Himself | 2 episodes |
| 2023 | History of the World, Part II | William Shakespeare | Episode: "I" |
| 2023 | Storybots: Answer Time | The Great Bubblini | Episode: "Bubbles" |
| 2023 | Solar Opposites | Pinecone / Rotten Peach / Jesse Guard #2 | Voice; episode: "The Earth Rake (beta)" |
| 2024 | Dinner Time Live with David Chang | Himself | Episode: "Holiday Noodle Cook-Off" |
| 2026 | Wonder Man | Himself | Episode: "Doorman" |
| 2026 | Breaking Bear | Alistair | Voice role; also executive producer |

=== Video games ===
| Year | Title | Voice roles |
|---|---|---|
| 2012 | MIB: Alien Crisis | Emilio Chauncey, Handsome Guest, Khnemu |
| 2013 | Frozen: Olaf's Quest | Olaf |
| 2015 | Disney Infinity 3.0 | Olaf |
| 2017 | South Park Phone Destroyer | Marcus Preston |
| 2019 | Kingdom Hearts III | Olaf |

=== Web ===
| Year | Title | Role | Notes |
|---|---|---|---|
| 2009 | Woke Up Dead | Matt | 21 episodes |
| 2013 | Kevin Pollak's Chat Show | Himself / Guest | Episode: "163" |
| 2019–present | Blood Ties | Michael Richland | Radio drama/podcast |
| 2020 | Reunited Apart | Host | Web series |

=== Theatre ===
| Year | Title | Role | Theatre | Notes |
|---|---|---|---|---|
| 2006–2007 | The 25th Annual Putnam County Spelling Bee | William Barfée | Circle in the Square Theatre | Broadway Replacement |
| 2011–2012 | The Book of Mormon | Elder Arnold Cunningham | Eugene O'Neill Theatre | Original Broadway Cast |
| 2023–2024 | Gutenberg! The Musical! | Bud Davenport | James Earl Jones Theatre | Original Broadway Cast |
| 2025 | Jesus Christ Superstar | King Herod | Hollywood Bowl | Regional production |
| 2026 | The Book of Mormon | Elder Arnold Cunningham | Eugene O’Neill Theatre | Broadway; 15th Anniversary Special Performances |

== Awards and nominations ==
| Year | Award | Category | Work | Result |
|---|---|---|---|---|
| 2011 | Tony Award | Best Performance by a Leading Actor in a Musical | The Book of Mormon | Nominated |
| 2012 | Grammy Award | Best Musical Theater Album | The Book of Mormon | Won |
| 2014 | Annie Awards | Outstanding Voice Acting in a Feature Production | Frozen | Won |
| 2016 | Golden Raspberry Award | Worst Supporting Actor | Pixels The Wedding Ringer | Nominated |
| 2020 | Annie Awards | Outstanding Voice Acting in a Feature Production | Frozen 2 | Won |
| 2020 | Nickelodeon Kids' Choice Awards | Favorite Male Voice from an Animated Movie | The Angry Birds Movie 2 Frozen 2 | Won |
| 2022 | Disney Legends Award | | | Honoree |
| 2024 | Drama League Award | Distinguished Performance | Gutenberg! The Musical! | Nominated |
