= Toy Vault =

American toy manufacturer

- Company type: Corporation
- Industry: Toys, board games
- Founded: 1998
- Headquarters: Corbin, Kentucky, US, USA
- Products: Firefly, Monty Python, Godzilla, The Princess Bride
- Website: http://www.toyvault.com

Toy Vault is an American company founded in 1998 that designs and manufactured plush toys, plush apparel, board games, and other novelty items.

Perhaps best known for its Monty Python toys, Toy Vault also holds licenses for such properties as Godzilla, The Princess Bride, Jim Henson's Labyrinth, Kiss, Firefly, Trigun and others.

== History ==
Toy Vault was founded in 1998 by Dan Mayer.

== The Lord of the Rings ==
Three months after its inception in 1998, Toy Vault acquired a license from Tolkien Enterprises to produce plastic action figures based on The Lord of the Rings. This was the first series of action figures produced based purely on a literary property.

== Pathfinder Puzzles ==
In 2020, Toy Vault was granted a license by Paizo Inc. The company produced plush toys and collectibles based on the Pathfinder and Starfinder universes. In 2021 and 2022, it released a series of themed puzzles, including Pathfinder and the Labyrinth.

== Current and previous product lines ==
=== Licensed ===
- Firefly (released Spring 2013)
- Monty Python
- Godzilla
- The Princess Bride
- The Dark Crystal
- Jim Henson's Labyrinth
- Farscape
- Rubik's Cube plush
- The Lord of the Rings
- Alice in Wonderland
- Astro City
- Dork Tower
- Knights of the Dinner Table
- Conker
- Cabbage Patch Kids children's furniture
- KISS
- Swear Bears
- Shin-chan
- Trigun
- SpongeBob SquarePants

=== Unlicensed ===
- Cthulhu Mythos
- Richard Borg's Abaddon (board game)
- Zombies Afoot! Plush Slippers
- Vault Gaming Supplies
