= The Princess Bride (novel) =

1973 fantasy romance novel by William Goldman

- Slipcase cover of the deluxe first edition of The Princess Bride
- Author: William Goldman
- Language: English
- Genre: Fantasy, romance, adventure, metafiction
- Publisher: Harcourt Brace Jovanovich
- Publication date: 1973
- Publication place: United States
- Pages: 493
- ISBN: 0-345-41826-3
- OCLC: 53223777
- Dewey Decimal: 813/.54 22
- LC Class: PS3557.O384 P75 2003

The Princess Bride: S. Morgenstern's Classic Tale of True Love and High Adventure, The "Good Parts" Version is a 1973 fantasy romance novel by American writer William Goldman. The book combines elements of comedy, adventure, fantasy, drama, romance, and fairy tale. It is metafictionally presented as an abridgment of a longer work by the fictional S. Morgenstern, and Goldman's commentary asides are constant throughout. It was originally published in the United States by Harcourt Brace, then later by Random House, while in the United Kingdom it was later published by Bloomsbury.

The book was adapted into a 1987 feature film directed by Rob Reiner, starring Cary Elwes and Robin Wright.

William Goldman said, "I've gotten more responses on The Princess Bride than on everything else I've done put together—all kinds of strange outpouring letters. Something in The Princess Bride affects people."

When the original edition failed to sell well, the author and editor Spider Robinson convinced Goldman to let him excerpt the novel, namely the "Duel Scene", in the anthology The Best of All Possible Worlds (1980). Robinson believes this helped the novel reach the right audience.

In 2015, a collection of essays on the novel and the film adaptation was published entitled The Princess Bride and Philosophy.

== Plot ==
Map of Florin and Guilder

The novel opens with William Goldman explaining how he came to write the story. He describes discovering that the "historical tale" he believed he knew from his father was actually a "good parts" abridgement. Upon supposedly finding the original, verbose work by the fictional S. Morgenstern, Goldman decides to create his own "good parts" version, which forms the main narrative.

In the Renaissance-era country of Florin, a young farm woman named Buttercup often bosses her servant, Westley. His constant reply, "As you wish," eventually reveals his love for her, which she reciprocates. Westley leaves to seek his fortune so they can marry, promising to return. However, Buttercup later receives news that the Dread Pirate Roberts attacked Westley's ship, leading her to believe he is dead. Years pass, and she is betrothed to Prince Humperdinck, heir to Florin's throne.

Before the wedding, Buttercup is kidnapped by a trio of outlaws: the Sicilian criminal genius Vizzini, the Spanish fencing master Inigo Montoya, and the enormous Turkish wrestler Fezzik. As they ascend the Cliffs of Insanity, a man in black pursues them. Vizzini cuts their rope, but the man clings to the cliff face.

The man in black reaches the top, where Inigo challenges him to a duel. Inigo reveals he seeks revenge on a six-fingered man who killed his father, Domingo Montoya. They engage in a skilled sword fight, which the man in black wins, but he spares Inigo's life out of respect.

The man in black continues his pursuit. Vizzini orders Fezzik to stop him, and Fezzik, preferring fair play, challenges the man to a wrestling match. The man outmaneuvers Fezzik, choking him unconscious. The man confronts Vizzini, who has blindfolded Buttercup, and proposes a Battle of Wits involving two goblets and the deadly "iocane powder." After a series of deceptions and elaborate speeches on intellectual prowess and trickery, Vizzini fools the man into drinking the poisoned wine. However, both cups were poisoned, leading to a surprised Vizzini's death. The man in black claims to have built up an immunity to the universally fatal poison.

Leaving, the man in black taunts Buttercup, claiming she felt nothing for Westley. Angered, she shoves him into a gorge, yelling, "You can die, too, for all I care!" The man calls, "As you wish!" Buttercup realizes the man is Westley and joins him in the gorge. They embrace passionately but are soon pursued by Prince Humperdinck's men. Westley reveals that the title of Dread Pirate Roberts is secretly passed down, and his love for Buttercup inspired the previous Roberts to spare his life. They flee through the always-deadly Fire Swamp and face the ferocious ROUSs (Rodents Of Unusual Size).

Westley and Buttercup escape the Fire Swamp but are captured by Prince Humperdinck and his six-fingered assistant, Count Tyrone Rugen. Buttercup negotiates for Westley's release, returning with Humperdinck to the palace. Rugen, following Humperdinck's secret orders, takes Westley to his underground "Zoo of Death" where he tortures him with "The Machine," which drains his life force.

Meanwhile, Buttercup has nightmares about her impending marriage. Humperdinck, who secretly plans to start a war with the neighboring country of Guilder, had orchestrated Buttercup's kidnapping and murder. He now believes her death on their wedding night will incite his subjects to fight more fiercely.

On the wedding day, Fezzik finds a drunken Inigo and reveals that Count Rugen is the six-fingered man. Inspired by the chance for revenge, Inigo regains sobriety. Knowing Vizzini is dead, they seek out the man in black, hoping his wits can help them storm the castle. Buttercup learns Humperdinck never sent ships to find Westley and taunts him with her enduring love. Enraged, Humperdinck tortures Westley to death. Westley's screams lead Inigo and Fezzik to the Zoo of Death.

They rescue Westley's body and enlist the help of the magician Miracle Max. Max pronounces Westley "mostly dead" and revives him, though Westley remains partially paralyzed and weak.

Westley devises a plan to invade the castle during the wedding. The commotion prompts Humperdinck to hasten the ceremony. Buttercup, planning suicide in the honeymoon suite, is intercepted by Westley. Inigo chases Rugen through the castle and kills him in a sword fight. Westley, still partially paralyzed, bluffs his way out of a duel with Humperdinck, revealing the prince's cowardice. Westley spares Humperdinck's life, and he, Buttercup, Fezzik, and Inigo escape on the prince's horses. The novel ends with the group facing further mishaps and pursuit, but the author suggests they ultimately get away.

== Context ==
This novel includes several narrative techniques or literary devices including a fictional frame story about how Goldman came to know about and decided to adapt S. Morgenstern's The Princess Bride. In Goldman's "footnotes," he describes how his father used to read The Princess Bride aloud to him; thus the book became Goldman's favorite without him ever actually reading the text. As a father, Goldman looked forward to sharing the story with his own son, going to great lengths to locate a copy for his son's birthday, only to be crushed when his son stops reading after the first chapter. When Goldman revisits the book himself, he discovers that what he believed was a straightforward adventure novel was in fact a bitter satire of politics in Morgenstern's native Florin, and that his father had been skipping all the political commentary and leaving in only "the good parts." This moves Goldman to abridge the book to a version resembling the one his father had read to him, while adding notes to summarize material he had "removed." Morgenstern and the "original version" are fictitious and used as a literary device to comment on the nature of adaptation and to draw a contrast between the love and adventure of the main story and the mundane aspects of everyday life. The nations of Guilder and Florin are likewise pure fiction. Each section or chapter takes place in a certain setting or place. It's an episodic structure with each "episode" taking place in a specific part of the Kingdom of Florin (the Cliffs of Insanity, the Fire Swamp or the Forest of Thieves [the Thieves Quarter of Florin City in the book]).

The narrator of The Princess Bride, while named William Goldman, is persona or author surrogate that mixes fictional elements with some biographical details that match the author's life. Goldman's personal life, as described in the introduction and commentary in the novel, is fictional. In The Princess Bride, Goldman claimed to have one son with his wife, Helen, a psychiatrist. In reality, Goldman married Ilene Jones, a photographer, in 1961. They had two daughters named Jenny and Susanna, and they divorced in 1991. Goldman's commentary contains references to his real-life Hollywood career, including the observation that the famous cliff scene in Butch Cassidy and the Sundance Kid was likely inspired by the Cliffs of Insanity from The Princess Bride. While Goldman did write the screenplay for Butch Cassidy and the Sundance Kid in 1969, it is unclear if all the career references have a basis in truth. The commentary is extensive, continuing through the text until the end.

The book's actual roots are in stories Goldman told to his daughters (aged 7 and 4), one of whom had requested a story about "princesses" and the other "brides". Goldman describes the earliest character names from the "kid's saga" as "silly names: Buttercup, Humperdinck". The novel is often considered a parody of adventure stories, but Goldman never intended to write it that way. He simply wanted to write a fun fairy tale for his daughters. The themes of romance, escape, and revenge also play into the idea that this book could be a parody. The countries are both named after coins. The florin was originally an Italian gold coin minted in Florence, and later the name of various currencies and denominations. The guilder was originally a Dutch gold coin, and later the name of various currencies used mainly in the Netherlands and its territories. The two names are often interchangeable.

Goldman said he wrote the first chapter about Buttercup which ran for about 20 pages. Then, he wrote the second chapter, "The Groom", about the man she was going to marry; Goldman only managed to write four pages before running dry. Then he got the idea to write an abridged novel:

And when that idea hit, everything changed. Tennessee Williams says there are three or four days when you are writing a play that the piece opens itself to you, and the good parts of the play are all from those days. Well, The Princess Bride opened itself to me. I never had a writing experience like it. I went back and wrote the chapter about Bill Goldman being at the Beverly Hills Hotel and it all just came out. I never felt as strongly connected emotionally to any writing of mine in my life. It was totally new and satisfying and it came as such a contrast to the world I had been doing in the films that I wanted to be a novelist again.

Goldman said he was particularly moved writing the scene in which Westley dies.

=== Reunion scene ===
In the novel's commentary, Goldman writes that he added nothing to the "original" Morgenstern text. He did write one original scene, a loving reunion between Buttercup and Westley, but, he said, his publisher objected to this addition. He invites any reader who wants to read the "Reunion Scene" to write to the publisher (formerly Harcourt Brace Jovanovich; now Random House) and request a copy. Many readers wrote in to the publisher and did receive a letter, but instead of an extra scene, the letter detailed the (obviously fictitious) legal problems that Goldman and his publishers encountered with the Morgenstern estate and its lawyer, Kermit Shog. This letter was revised and updated periodically; the 1987 revision mentioned the movie, while the 25th Anniversary Edition published the letter with an addendum about Kermit's lawyer granddaughter Carly. The 30th Anniversary Edition has a footnote that the three pages of the reunion scene were now available online. However, the website itself contained nothing but the text of the original three letters. This website has since been taken down and superseded by the Houghton Mifflin Harcourt product page for the book, which provides the 2003 version of the Reunion Scene letter as a digital download.

== Buttercup's Baby ==
The epilogue to some later editions of the novel, notably the 25th anniversary edition, mentions a sequel, Buttercup's Baby, that was "having trouble getting published because of legal difficulties with S. Morgenstern's estate". Later editions actually reprint Goldman's "sample chapter".

The chapter consists of a disjointed assemblage of stories about the quartet's escape to "One Tree Island", and the eventual kidnapping of Waverly (Westley and Buttercup's daughter) by a skinless-faced "madman" who eventually throws her off a mountainside. The chapter ends with Fezzik, Waverly's appointed babysitter, leaping off the mountain to save her, and then cradling her to preserve her from the impact that seems certain to spell at least Fezzik's doom. Also noteworthy is a flashback to Inigo's past, his training as a swordsman, and his one-time romantic love interest.

The chapter also continues the author's extensive footnotes after he is outraged to learn that the fiercely protective Morgenstern estate had finally relented to an abridgment of Buttercup's Baby done not by Goldman but by author Stephen King. The footnotes detail Goldman's visit to the fictional nation of Florin, which houses a popular museum devoted to the "real" story of The Princess Bride and contains such artifacts as Inigo's six-fingered sword.

The 30th anniversary edition of The Princess Bride included hints to the sequel's plot, and a promise to have the full version completed before a 50th anniversary edition (2023).

In a January 2007 interview, Goldman admitted he was having difficulty coming up with ideas for the story:

MPM: I hear you're working on a sequel to The Princess Bride called Buttercup's Baby. William Goldman: I desperately want to write it, and I sit there and nothing happens and I get pissed at myself. I got lucky with The Princess Bride the first time, and I'd love to get lucky again.

Goldman died in 2018, without completing the sequel.

== Adaptations ==
In 1982 Ray Harryhausen was approached by British producer Milton Subotsky, who had written a script based on the novel. Harryhausen liked the book but found too many problems with the screenplay. He and Subotsky worked together in an attempt to create a new script, but eventually gave up.

The book was adapted into a 1987 feature film directed by Rob Reiner from a screenplay written by Goldman himself.

Goldman partnered with Adam Guettel to create a musical version of the story with Goldman writing the book and Guettel writing the music, but the two parted ways on the project when Goldman demanded 75% of the author's royalties, though Guettel was writing both the music and the lyrics. Guettel's score was nearly complete, but it is unlikely to be heard beyond an orchestral suite performed at the Hollywood Bowl in 2006.

In November 2013, Disney Theatrical announced that it will be staging a new stage musical version, based on the novel and film screenplay.

In 2008, Toy Vault, Inc. announced it was working on a Princess Bride–based card game due for release in the second quarter of 2008. It also announced that it is working on a board game, the second produced for this movie, after a simple board game included with some VHS releases.

Also in 2008, the production company Worldwide Biggies released a computer game, The Princess Bride Game. Several actors from the movie provided voices for their video game counterparts, including Mandy Patinkin as Inigo Montoya, Wallace Shawn as Vizzini, and Robin Wright as Buttercup.

Sierra Online parodied the title of the novel in their computer game King's Quest VII: The Princeless Bride.

In 2014, Game Salute licensed the tabletop game adaptation publishing rights to the Princess Bride; a series of board and card games were released later that year.

In 2019, Toy Vault produced a Role Playing Game written by Steffan O'Sullivan.

On September 13, 2020, the surviving members of the original cast participated in a live script reading that was a fundraiser for the Wisconsin Democratic Party.

In 2021, BBC Radio 4 produced a two-part radio adaptation by Stephen Keyworth (referred to as "The Best Bits of the Good Parts Version"), with the first part broadcast on Christmas Day 2021 and the second on New Year's Day 2022. During the week of 26 December 2021, five mini-episodes, "Bitesize Backstories", dealing with the backstories of the book itself and four of the main characters "which can be enjoyed as stand-alone stories or to enhance [the listener's] experience of the drama", were also broadcast on BBC Radio 4.

In 2023, Wizards of the Coast printed a Secret Lair drop featuring reworks of existing Magic: the Gathering cards as characters and situations from the film.

== See also ==
- Ruritanian romance
