= Inigo Montoya =

Fictional character

- The Princess Bride character
- Inigo Montoya, portrayed by Mandy Patinkin in the 1987 film adaptation of The Princess Bride
- First appearance: The Princess Bride
- Created by: William Goldman
- Portrayed by: Mandy Patinkin

In-universe information
- Species: Human
- Gender: Male
- Occupation: Swordsman
- Nationality: Spanish

Inigo Montoya is a fictional character in William Goldman's 1973 novel The Princess Bride. In Rob Reiner's 1987 film adaptation, he was portrayed by Mandy Patinkin. In both the book and the movie, he was originally from Spain and resided in the fictional country of Florin.

== Character background ==
In The Princess Bride, Inigo Montoya is portrayed as a Spanish fencer and henchman to the Sicilian criminal Vizzini. Inigo's father Domingo was a great swordsmith, but he remained obscure because he disliked dealing with the rich and privileged. When Count Rugen, a nobleman with a six-fingered right hand, asked him to forge a sword to accommodate his unusual grip, Domingo labored over the sword for a year. When Rugen returned, he said he would pay for the sword at one tenth his promised price. Thus, Domingo refused to sell him the sword, not as a matter of money, but because Count Rugen could not appreciate the great work of the sword. He proclaimed that the sword would now belong to Inigo. Rugen then promptly killed Domingo. Eleven-year-old Inigo witnessed the crime and challenged Rugen to a fight, wherein Rugen disarmed Inigo in under a minute, but was genuinely disconcerted by the boy's skill at fencing; recognizing Inigo's talent, Rugen spared his life and allowed him to keep the sword, but gave him two scars, one on each cheek.

Inigo then went to live with his father's friend and fellow swordmaker Yeste for two years; devastated by the loss, he devoted himself to becoming a great swordsman to be able to avenge his father. His training included tutelage under the most skilled fencing masters of his time. In the 30th anniversary version of "The Princess Bride", it is revealed that, while training for his revenge against Count Rugen, Inigo falls in love with a servant girl, Giulietta. He woos her, and she reveals that she is a Countess and is in love with him as well. The two dance, and it is implied that Inigo leaves the next day. After ten years of training, Inigo becomes the greatest swordsman of his generation and the only living man to hold the rank of "wizard" (a fictional fencing rank above "master").

== In The Princess Bride ==
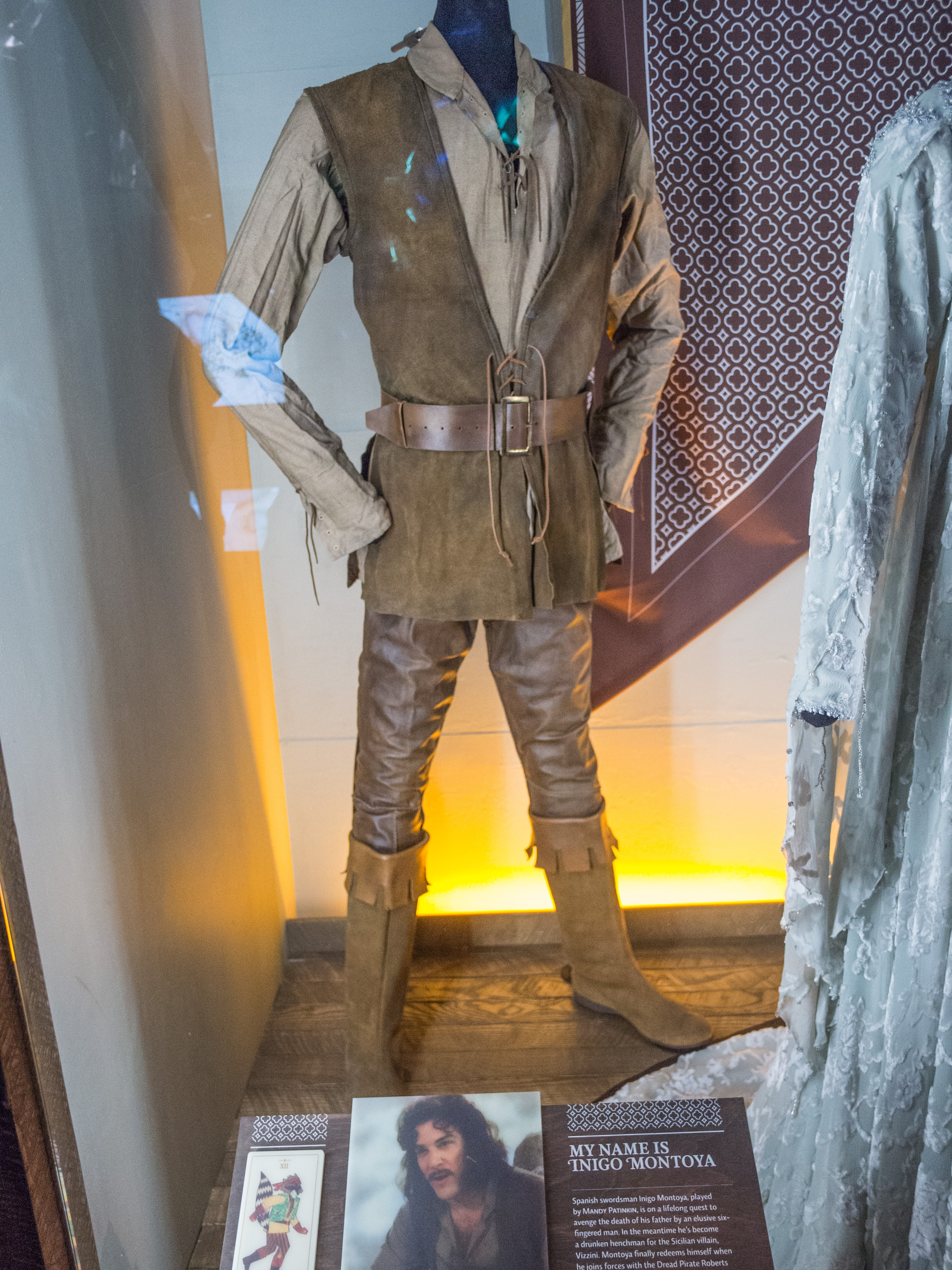
Montoya's costume as presented in the Science Fiction and Fantasy Hall of Fame in Seattle

Unable to find his father's killer and fearing that he would never fulfill his quest, Inigo sinks into depression and alcoholism before the criminal Vizzini (Wallace Shawn) finds him. Vizzini, Inigo, and a Turk named Fezzik (Andre the Giant) are hired by an unknown man to kidnap and kill the "princess bride", Buttercup. Subsequent events lead to Inigo's duel with the "Man in Black" (Westley), an extended sequence in both the book and the movie, in which both contestants begin fencing left-handed and eventually convert to their dominant right hands as the contest intensifies. Westley eventually bests Inigo in the battle, but spares his life (knocking Inigo unconscious instead) out of respect for his abilities.

When Inigo regains consciousness, he enters the Thieves' Quarter of Florin City, falls into depression, and becomes a useless drunkard once more. Eventually, Fezzik finds him and helps him regain his health. They eventually rescue Westley from Rugen's torture chamber but find, to their chagrin, that he appears to be dead. In desperation, they take him to Miracle Max, the late king's former "miracle man", who tells them that Westley is only "mostly dead". Inigo persuades Max to help by appealing to Max's hatred of Prince Humperdinck, who had fired him, and they bring Westley back to life.

That night, Inigo joins Westley to fight Humperdinck, and finally confronts his father's killer with repeated recitations of the words he had waited half his life to say:

Hello. My name is Inigo Montoya. You killed my father. Prepare to die.

Rugen runs away. Inigo chases him throughout the castle until Rugen suddenly throws a knife at him and seriously wounds him, mocking his quest as he prepares to deliver the fatal blow. At the last second, Inigo recovers his strength and duels his father's murderer, repeating his fateful words as he corners Rugen, inflicting on him the same dueling scars. Rugen begs for his life and offers to give Inigo anything he wants before trying to attack him again; Inigo catches Rugen's sword arm and replies, "I want my father back, you son of a bitch," as he kills him.

The film and the novel have slightly different endings for Inigo. At the end of the film, having avenged his father and thus no longer in "the revenge business", Inigo ponders what he will do with the rest of his life. In response, Westley offers Inigo a position as successor to "The Dread Pirate Roberts". The novel ends with Inigo's wounds reopening while he is on the run from the Brute Squad, leaving his future in doubt, although the narrator speculates he managed to escape.

== Reception ==
Mandy Patinkin has said that his inspiration for the scene in which Inigo kills Count Rugen was the real-life death of his father of cancer and the feeling that his character killing Rugen would bring him back. Patinkin described having walked around the grounds of the castle, imagining his confrontation with the six-fingered man as a way to go back and save his father from his illness.

Variety praised Patinkin's performance, writing, "Patinkin especially is a joy to watch and the film comes to life when his longhaired, scruffy cavalier is on screen." His character has earned a cult following and his memorable line "My name is Inigo Montoya. You killed my father. Prepare to die", was ranked #86 by IGN in their list of "Top 100 Movie Moments".
