= Dread Pirate Roberts =

Character in The Princess Bride, created 1973

- The Princess Bride character
- First appearance: The Princess Bride
- Created by: William Goldman
- Portrayed by: Cary Elwes

In-universe information
- Species: Human
- Gender: Male
- Occupation: Pirate
- Nationality: Florin, and others

The Dread Pirate Roberts is the identity assumed by several characters in the novel The Princess Bride (1973) and its 1987 film adaptation. Various pirates (including Westley) take on the role of Roberts and use his reputation to intimidate their opponents, before retiring and secretly passing on the name to someone else.

== Role in The Princess Bride ==
In the novel, the character of Dread Pirate Roberts is described as being a feared pirate, known for his ruthlessness and sword fighting prowess. He is also well known for taking no prisoners.

It is revealed during the course of the story that Roberts is not one man; rather, it is a series of individuals who pass the Roberts name and reputation to a chosen successor once they are wealthy enough to retire. When the time comes, the current "Roberts" and his chosen successor sail into port and discharge the crew. They then hire a new crew, the ex-Roberts staying aboard as first mate and referring to his successor as "Captain Roberts". Once the crew grows accustomed to the new Roberts, the previous captain leaves to enjoy his retirement.

Westley, the hero of The Princess Bride, was on a voyage to seek his fortune when his ship was captured by the Dread Pirate (who never leaves captives alive) and Westley is reported dead. While the other passengers are weeping and offering bribery for their lives, Westley simply asks Roberts to please not kill him. The "please" arousing his interest, Roberts asks, "Why should I make an exception of you?" Westley then explains his mission to get enough money to reunite with his true love, Buttercup. Westley's description of Buttercup's beauty moves Roberts to the point that he hires Westley as a personal attendant. While Roberts is impressed with Westley's work, he continues to keep Westley's future in doubt by saying each night, "Good night, Westley. Good work. Sleep well. I'll most likely kill you in the morning." After about three years, Roberts and Westley have grown close, and Roberts promotes Westley to his second-in-command. Shortly after that, Roberts reveals to Westley that the guise of the "Dread Pirate Roberts" is merely a pseudonym that he has inherited, and that his real name is Ryan. Roberts goes on to explain that the method works because Roberts' notorious reputation inspires overwhelming fear in sailors. Ships immediately capitulate and surrender their wealth rather than be taken by force, a fate they imagine to be certain death. A pirate operating under his own name is said to be incapable of such infamy: "No one would surrender to the Dread Pirate Westley."

The fear inspired by the title is used in Westley's plan of invading the castle right before Buttercup's wedding. In the invasion the giant Fezzik poses as Roberts to inspire fear in the castle guard. The fear is amplified by Fezzik's size and a few more tricks, and makes the entire guard run away so that the invaders can easily enter.

=== Retirement ===
In both the movie and the novel, Westley indicates that he plans to retire after reuniting with Buttercup. In the movie, he suggests that Inigo Montoya might succeed him. However, in the novel, no mention is made as to who is to succeed Westley as the Dread Pirate Roberts. In the first chapter of Buttercup's Baby (the supposed sequel to the novel), which is included in the 25th anniversary edition of the book, Goldman refers to 'Pierre', who is in charge of the pirate ship Revenge during Westley's absence and next in line to become the Dread Pirate Roberts. By the end of the chapter, Westley and his companions leave the ship again, presumably leaving Pierre once again in charge, but no mention is made of an official transfer of the title of Dread Pirate Roberts.

=== Holders of the title ===
Holders of the title Dread Pirate Roberts include:

1. The original Roberts, retired 15 years in Patagonia at the time Ryan picked Westley to be the next Dread Pirate Roberts
2. Clooney, the original Roberts' first mate (only in the novel)
3. Cummerbund
4. Ryan
5. Westley, who presumably retired shortly following the end of the novel
6. Inigo Montoya, who presumably inherited the title from Westley (movie version)
7. Pierre, who was in line to assume the title after Westley (novel version)

In the film's continuity, neither Clooney nor Pierre are mentioned, and Westley does not state how many (if any) individuals held the title between the original Roberts and Cummerbund.

== Other uses of the name ==
Ross Ulbricht, operator of the illicit goods marketplace Silk Road, used the alias Dread Pirate Roberts. In a display of life imitating art, another person claimed the name Dread Pirate Roberts, reopening the Silk Road website one month after the original site was seized by US law enforcement.

The name was also used by John Hiatt in his song, "Only the Song Survives", from the album Crossing Muddy Waters.

== See also ==
- Bartholomew Roberts
- Roberts (surname)
