= The Princess Bride =

1987 film by Rob Reiner

- Theatrical release poster by John Alvin
- Directed by: Rob Reiner
- Screenplay by: William Goldman
- Based on: The Princess Bride: S. Morgenstern's Classic Tale of True Love and High Adventure, The "Good Parts" Version by William Goldman
- Produced by: Andrew Scheinman; Rob Reiner
- Starring: Cary Elwes; Mandy Patinkin; Chris Sarandon; Christopher Guest; Wallace Shawn; André the Giant; Robin Wright; Peter Falk; Billy Crystal; Carol Kane
- Cinematography: Adrian Biddle
- Edited by: Robert Leighton
- Music by: Mark Knopfler
- Production company: Act III Communications
- Distributed by: 20th Century Fox (United States and Canada); Interaccess Film Distribution (international)
- Release date: September 25, 1987
- Running time: 98 minutes
- Country: United States
- Language: English
- Budget: $16 million
- Box office: $31 million

The Princess Bride is a 1987 American fantasy-adventure-comedy film directed and co-produced by Rob Reiner and starring Cary Elwes, Robin Wright, Mandy Patinkin, André the Giant, Chris Sarandon, Christopher Guest, Wallace Shawn, Peter Falk, Fred Savage, Billy Crystal and Carol Kane. Adapted by William Goldman from his novel of the same name, it tells the story of a swashbuckling farmhand named Westley, accompanied by companions befriended along the way, who must rescue his kidnapped true love Princess Buttercup from the evil Prince Humperdinck. The film preserves the novel's metafictional narrative style by presenting the story as a book being read by a grandfather to his sick grandson.

The film was first released by 20th Century Fox in the United States and by Interaccess Film Distribution in international markets on September 25, 1987, and received widespread critical acclaim. After having only modest initial box office success, it has over time become a cult film and gained recognition as one of the greatest films of the 1980s as well as one of Reiner's best works. The film is number 50 on Bravo's "100 Funniest Movies", number 88 on The American Film Institute's (AFI) "AFI's 100 Years...100 Passions" list of the 100 greatest film love stories, and 46 in Channel 4's 50 Greatest Comedy Films list. The film also won the 1988 Hugo Award for Best Dramatic Presentation and the People's Choice Award at the 12th Toronto International Film Festival. In 2016, the film was selected by the Library of Congress for preservation in the United States National Film Registry as being "culturally, historically or aesthetically significant".

== Plot ==
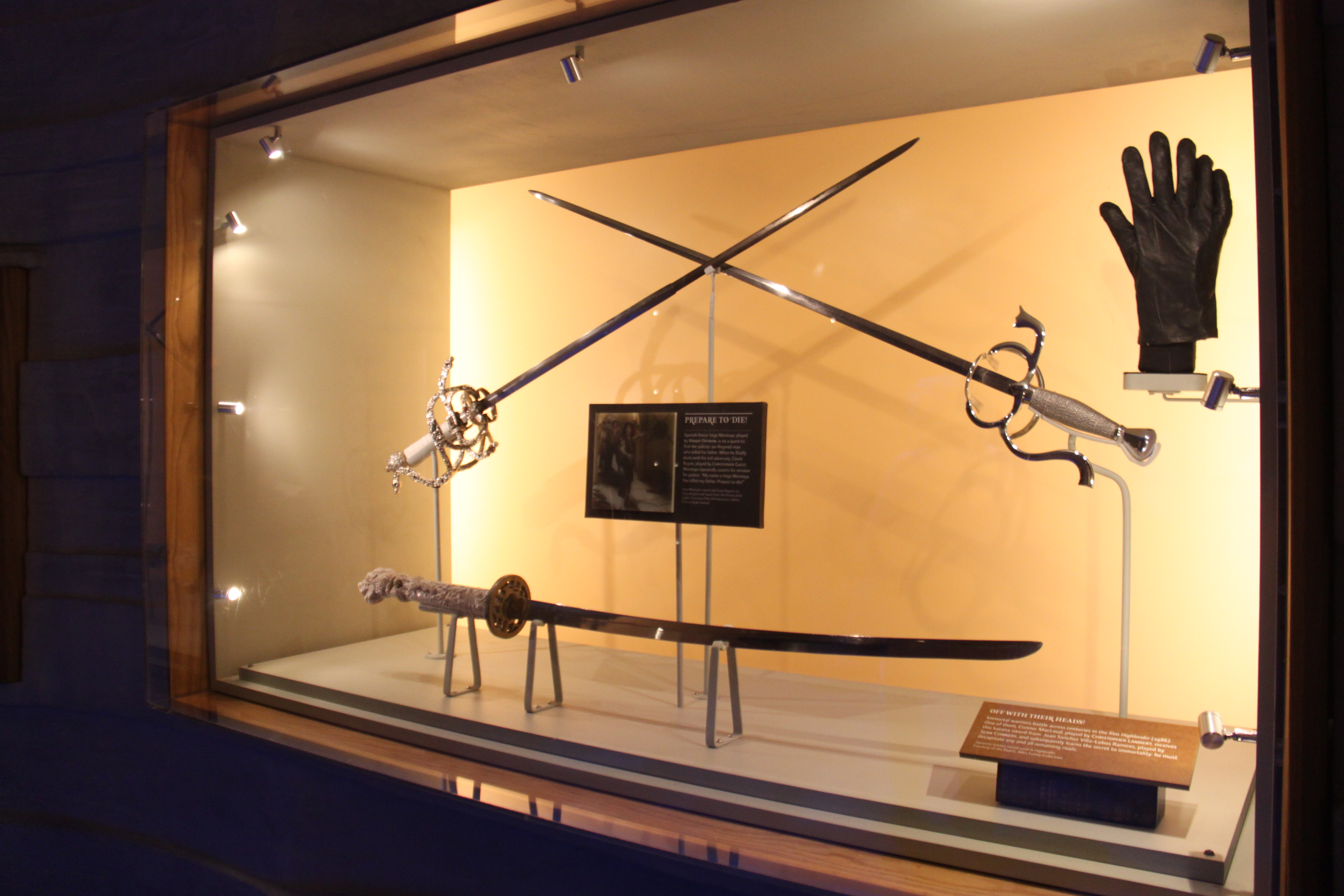
Inigo Montoya's sword (left) crossed with the sword used by Count Rugen (right) in the duel at the castle; beside it, Count Rugen's six-fingered glove. At bottom is the prop sword used in Highlander: The Series.

In the frame story, a grandfather reads a novel called The Princess Bride to his sick grandson, who reluctantly listens.

Buttercup is a young woman living on a farm in the kingdom of Florin. Her farmhand Westley obediently follows her stringent commands, always responding with "As you wish." Buttercup eventually realizes Westley is saying he loves her, and she reciprocates his feelings. Westley leaves to seek his fortune overseas so they can marry, but his ship is attacked by the Dread Pirate Roberts, who infamously leaves no survivors.

Five years later, Buttercup, still grief-stricken, is forcibly betrothed to Florin's arrogant Prince Humperdinck. Before the wedding, she is kidnapped by crafty Sicilian criminal Vizzini and his accomplices: gentle giant Fezzik, and expert Spanish swordsman Inigo Montoya, who seeks a six-fingered man that killed his father. A masked man in black pursues them across the sea, as do Humperdinck and his soldiers.

Atop the Cliffs of Insanity, the man in black defeats Inigo in a sword duel and knocks him out, chokes Fezzik into unconsciousness, and kills Vizzini by tricking him into drinking poison. He absconds with Buttercup ahead of Humperdinck's party. When Buttercup identifies him as the Dread Pirate Roberts, she rebukes him for killing Westley and shoves him into a ravine. While tumbling down, he shouts, "As you wish!" Realizing he is Westley, Buttercup tumbles after him and they reunite. The couple then flees into the dangerous Fire Swamp to avoid Humperdinck's party.

In the Fire Swamp, Westley explains that the "Dread Pirate Roberts" is an inherited title. The previous Roberts spared and recruited Westley, then retired and passed the mantle on to him. Having found Buttercup, Westley intends to do the same. Humperdinck captures the couple at the Fire Swamp's exit, but Buttercup agrees to return with Humperdinck after he promises to release Westley. Humperdinck then secretly orders his advisor Count Rugen, the six-fingered man, to take Westley to his torture chamber, the Pit of Despair.

After a nightmare, Buttercup threatens to kill herself if Humperdinck marries her. He placates her by promising to find Westley, then privately confides in Rugen that he plans to murder Buttercup, which Vizzini failed to do, and subsequently declare war on the neighboring country of Guilder. To maintain the ruse, Humperdinck has his enforcers organize a "brute squad" to clear out the nearby thieves' forest. Fezzik, as part of the brute squad, finds Inigo drunk in the forest, sobers him up, and informs him of Count Rugen's existence. Recalling Westley's versatility and intelligence, Inigo and Fezzik search for him to help them kill Rugen.

Buttercup discovers Humperdinck's duplicity and labels him a coward. Enraged, he imprisons her and tortures Westley seemingly to death. Inigo and Fezzik follow Westley's screams to the Pit, discover his lifeless body, and take it to Miracle Max, a folk healer whom Humperdinck recently fired. Max declares that Westley is only "mostly dead", and after Inigo promises that Westley can humiliate Humperdinck, Max and his wife concoct a pill to revive him.

Fezzik and Inigo revive Westley with the pill, rendering him conscious but barely able to move. By impersonating the Dread Pirate Roberts, the three infiltrate the castle as the wedding begins and encounter Rugen, who flees with Inigo in pursuit. Despite an ambush from Rugen, Inigo kills him. At the wedding, Humperdinck impatiently rushes the ceremony, then sends Buttercup to her chambers. Before she can commit suicide, Westley intercepts Buttercup and reminds her that she never gave her vows, invalidating the marriage. Humperdinck discovers them and challenges Westley to a duel, but Westley intimidates Humperdinck into submission. Inigo reunites with the couple, and Westley offers him the title of Dread Pirate Roberts. The three escape on horseback with Fezzik, and as dawn breaks, Westley and Buttercup share a passionate kiss.

The sick grandson eagerly asks his grandfather to read him the story again the next day. His grandfather replies, "As you wish."

== Cast ==
- Cary Elwes as Westley/the Dread Pirate Roberts
- Mandy Patinkin as Inigo Montoya
- Chris Sarandon as Prince Humperdinck
- Christopher Guest as Count Tyrone Rugen
- Wallace Shawn as Vizzini
- André the Giant as Fezzik
- Fred Savage as the grandson
- Robin Wright as Princess Buttercup
- Peter Falk as the grandfather
- Peter Cook as the Impressive Clergyman
- Mel Smith as the Albino
- Carol Kane as Valerie
- Billy Crystal as Miracle Max

Additional cast members include Betsy Brantley as the mother of Savage's character; Margery Mason as the Ancient Booer who heckles Buttercup in her dream; Willoughby Gray and Anne Dyson as the King and Queen of Florin; Malcolm Storry as chief enforcer Yellin; Paul Badger as an assistant brute; and Anthony Georghiou and Danny Blackner as the Rodents Of Unusual Size.

== Production ==
=== Development ===
Rob Reiner was gifted a copy of The Princess Bride by his father. The 1973 fantasy romance novel is a fairy tale metafictionally presented as an abridgment of a longer work by the fictional S. Morgenstern, and Goldman's commentary asides are constant throughout. He decided he wanted to make the film adaptation after successfully demonstrating his filmmaking skill with the release of This Is Spinal Tap in 1984. During production of Stand by Me, released in 1986, Reiner had spoken to an executive at Paramount Pictures regarding what his next film would be, and suggested the adaptation of The Princess Bride. He was told they could not, leading Reiner to discover that several studios had previously attempted to bring Goldman's book to the big screen without success.

Those previous attempts included 20th Century Fox, which paid Goldman $500,000 for the film rights and to do a screenplay in 1973. Richard Lester was signed to direct and the movie was almost made, but the head of production at Fox was fired and the project was put on hiatus. Goldman subsequently bought back the film rights to the novel. Other directors had also attempted to adapt the book, including François Truffaut, Robert Redford and Norman Jewison, and at one point, Christopher Reeve was interested in playing Westley in one planned adaptation. Reiner found success by gaining financial support from Norman Lear, whom Reiner knew from All in the Family and who had funded production of This Is Spinal Tap, with the production to be distributed by 20th Century Fox. Reiner worked closely with Goldman to adapt the book for the screenplay.

In a 2011 interview with Entertainment Weekly, Reiner acknowledged that then-20th Century Fox head Barry Diller also had a prominent role in the film's production, instructing him to make it a film which, like The Wizard of Oz, could instead find greater success over time rather than immediately after its initial release.

=== Casting ===
Reiner had quickly decided on Cary Elwes for Westley, based on his performance in Lady Jane; however, during the casting period in Los Angeles, Elwes was in West Germany on set for Maschenka. Reiner flew out to West Berlin to meet with Elwes, confirming his appropriateness for the role. While Reiner and casting director Jane Jenkins auditioned other actors for Westley, they knew Elwes was perfect for the part. Elwes had read the book in his childhood and was enamored with the character of Westley, but never imagined that he would ever have the opportunity to play him.

Robin Wright was cast late in the process, about a week before filming. Uma Thurman, Meg Ryan, Sean Young, Suzy Amis, Courteney Cox, Alexandra Paul and Whoopi Goldberg all auditioned for the role. Wright's agent had heard of the casting call and encouraged Wright to audition. Though initially shy, Wright impressed Jenkins, and later Reiner. They invited Wright to come meet Goldman at his house. Jenkins recalls: "The doorbell rang. Rob went to the door, and literally, as he opened the door, [Wright] was standing there in this little white summer dress, with her long blonde hair, and she had a halo from the sun. She was backlit by God. And Bill Goldman looked across the room at her, and he said, 'Well, that's what I wrote.' It was the most perfect thing." Moreover, Wright adopted a British accent for her role, reflecting the convention in medieval-set fantasy films of using British accents to evoke a historical European setting. Mandy Patinkin and Wallace Shawn were early choices for the cast; Shawn in particular was chosen as Vizzini due to his diminutive size to contrast that of the giant Fezzik. Danny DeVito was considered for the role of Vizzini.

When Goldman originally shopped his novel in the early 1970s, his first choice for Fezzik was André the Giant, whose wrestling schedule left him unavailable for filming. Goldman's second choice was Arnold Schwarzenegger, who at that time was almost unknown as an actor. By the time The Princess Bride was finally green-lit, Schwarzenegger was a major film star and the studio could not afford him. Jenkins contacted the World Wrestling Federation to ask about hiring André, but was told that the filming conflicted with a wrestling match in Tokyo that would pay him $5 million. Jenkins auditioned other tall men, including Kareem Abdul-Jabbar, Lou Ferrigno and Carel Struycken, but these did not pan out. André was hesitant to take the part on the account of the fact that the film's dialogue was in English while he was French and because he was a professional wrestler, not an actor. Furthermore, André was suffering much pain resulting from his acromegaly, which was to eventually lead to his early death. Liam Neeson also auditioned for the role, but he was turned down due to height. Near the end of casting, the World Wrestling Federation told Jenkins that André's match in Tokyo had been cancelled, clearing him to play the role of Fezzik. For his part, André found his participation was a gratifying experience considering that no one stared at him on set during production as a kind of freak, but instead simply treated him as a fellow member of the cast.

=== Filming ===
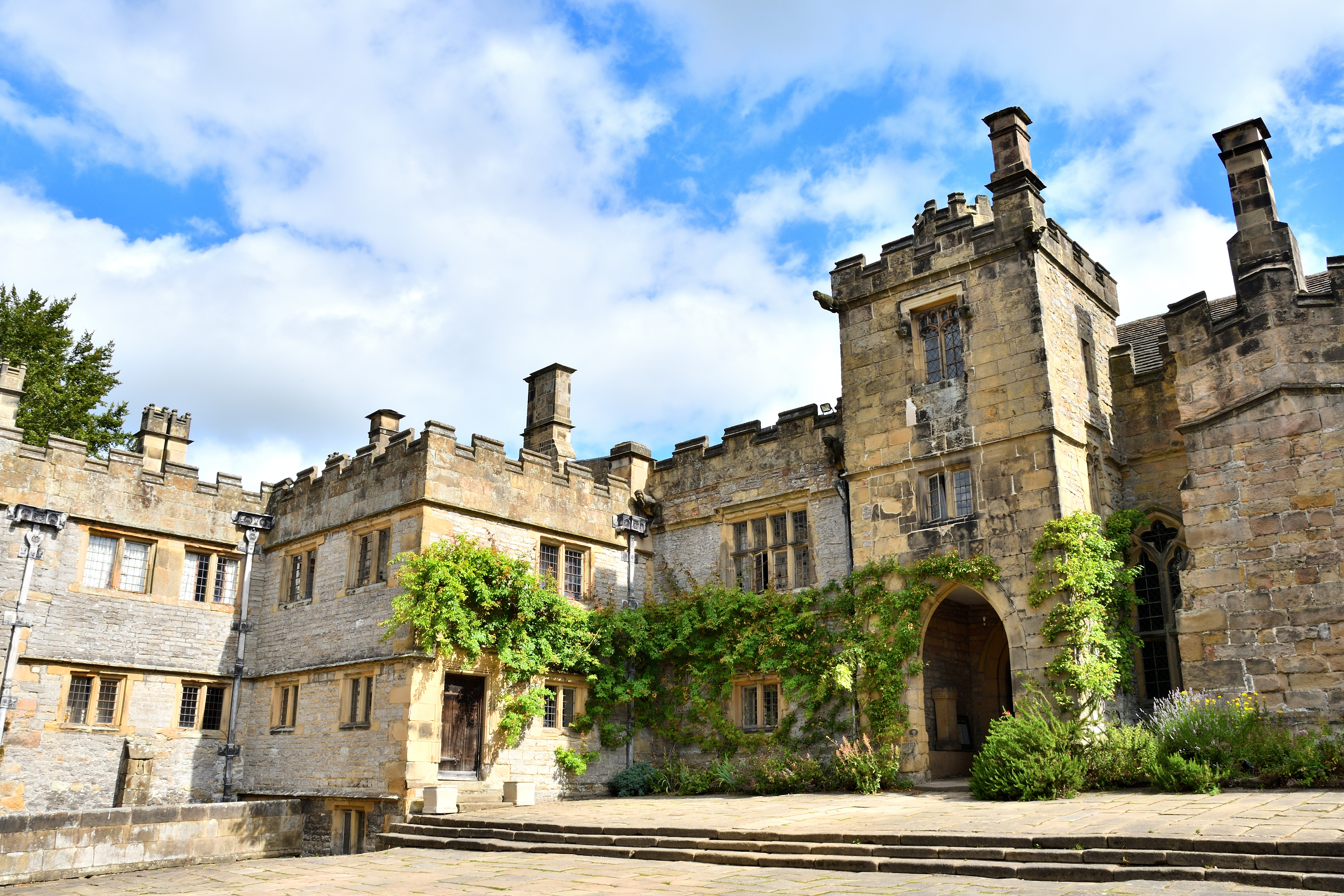
Haddon Hall was used for the interior and exterior of Prince Humperdinck’s castle.

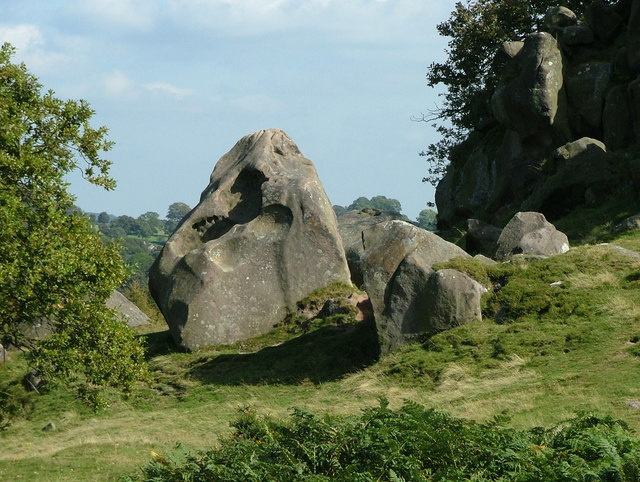
Robin Hood's Stride was the location for the fight between Westley and Fezzik.

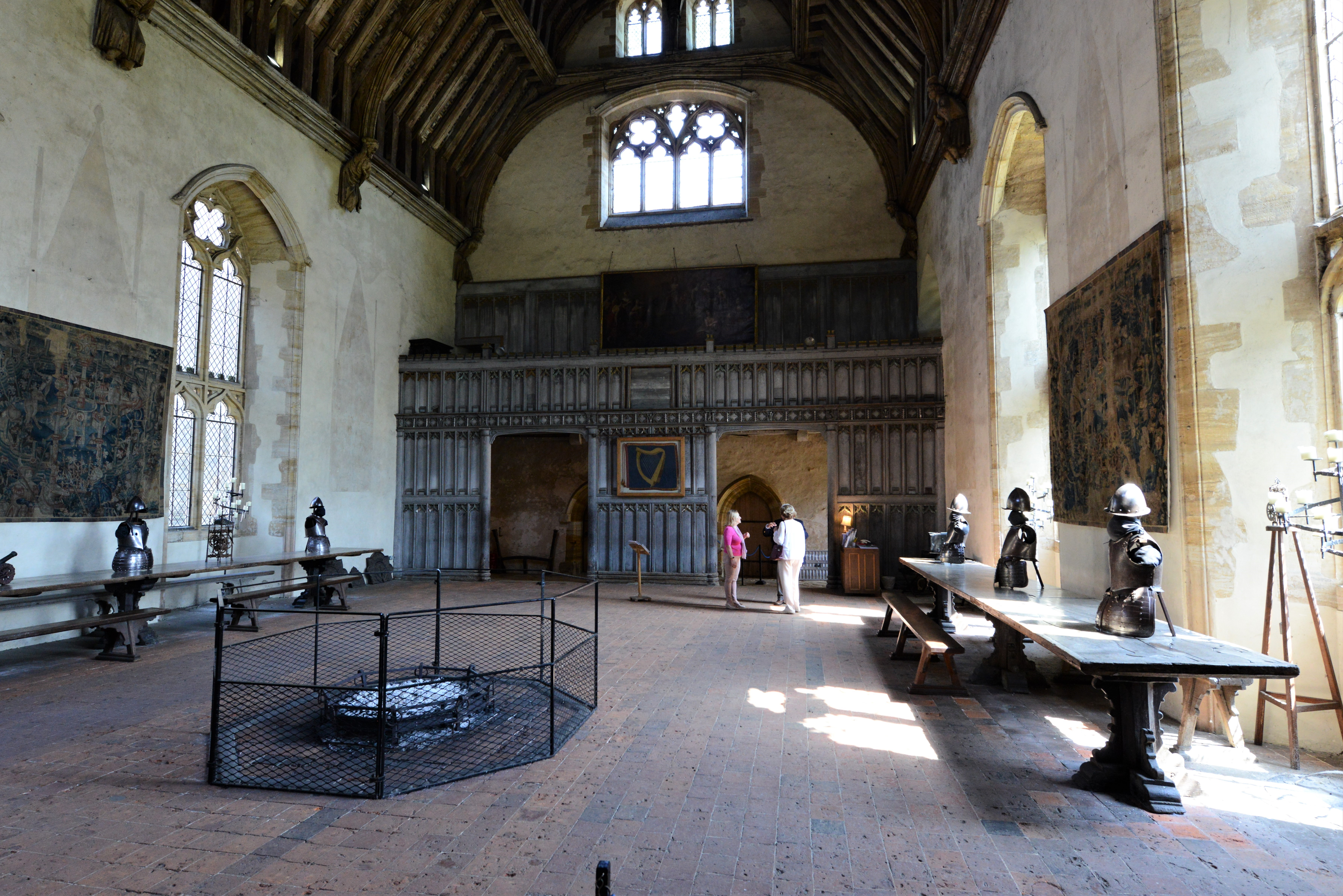
The interior for Prince Humperdinck’s castle hall was filmed at Baron's Hall, Penshurst Place.

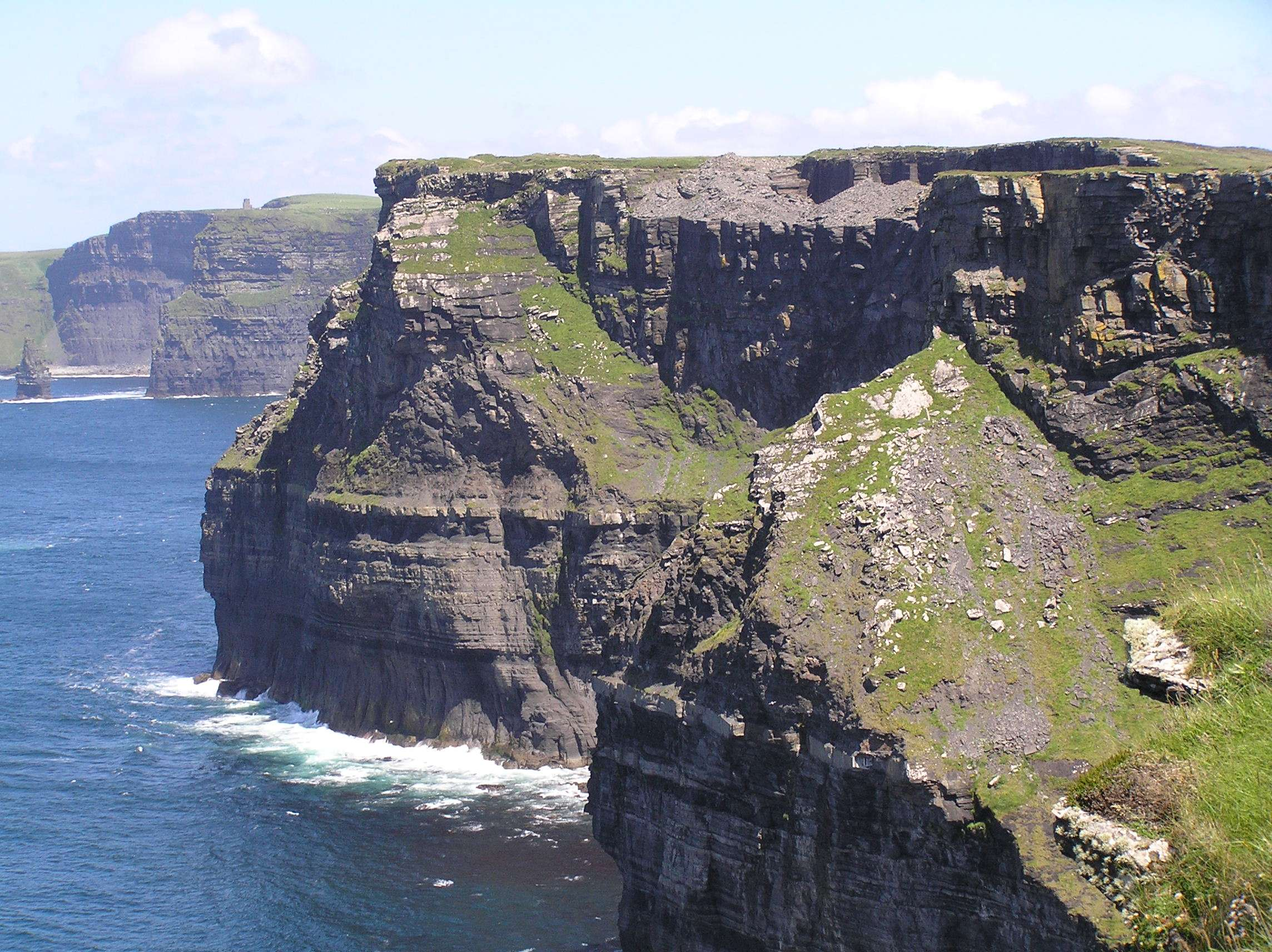
The establishing shot of the Cliffs of Insanity was the Cliffs of Moher.

The film was shot in various locations in England and Ireland in summer and autumn 1986:

- Carl Wark, Sheffield, England
- Burnham Beeches, Buckinghamshire, England
- Lathkill Dale where it meets Cales Dale, Derbyshire, England (the "battle of wits" scene)
- Cave Dale, Castleton, Derbyshire, England
- Bradley Rocks and Robin Hood's Stride, Birchover, Derbyshire, England
- Cliffs of Moher, County Clare, Ireland (for the Cliffs of Insanity)
- Haddon Hall, Bakewell, Derbyshire, England
- Penshurst Place, Kent, England
- Hever Castle, Kent, England

The framing story scenes, the last to be filmed, were shot at Shepperton Studios in Surrey. Reiner rented a house in England near these sites and frequently invited the cast over for meals and light-hearted get-togethers. Many cast members believed this helped to create a sense of "family" that helped to improve their performances for the film. Elwes and Patinkin learned to fence (both left- and right-handed) for the film, and they performed the combat scenes themselves, with the exception of two somersaults performed by stunt doubles. They, along with Christopher Guest, were trained by fencing instructor Bob Anderson and stunt coordinator Peter Diamond, both of whom had also worked on training the actors in the original Star Wars trilogy. Elwes and Patinkin spent about three weeks prior to filming learning to fence, and they spent most of their off-camera free time practicing. Anderson encouraged the two to learn the other's choreography for the fight to help them anticipate the movements and avoid an accident. They also watched many sword fights from previous films to see how they could improve on those.

André the Giant had undergone major back surgery prior to filming and, despite his great size and strength, could not support the weight of Elwes during their fight scene or Wright for a scene at the end of the film. For the wrestling scene, when Elwes hangs on André's back, he was actually walking on a series of ramps below the camera during close-ups. For the wide shots, a stunt double took the place of André. When he was apparently carrying Wright, she was actually suspended by cables. Billy Crystal and Carol Kane spent time before traveling to England to work out the backstory between Miracle Max and his wife and develop a rapport for their characters. Once on set, Reiner allowed them to improvise some of their lines.

=== Soundtrack ===
The original soundtrack album was composed by Mark Knopfler of Dire Straits. It was released by Warner Bros. Records in the United States and Vertigo Records internationally in November 1987. The album contains the song "Storybook Love", performed by Willy DeVille and produced by Knopfler. It was nominated for an Academy Award for Best Original Song at the 60th Academy Awards.

In his audio commentary of the film on the special edition DVD, director Reiner said that only Knopfler could create a soundtrack to capture the film's quirky yet romantic nature. Reiner was an admirer of Knopfler's work but did not know him before working on the film. He sent the script to him hoping he would agree to score the film. Knopfler agreed on one condition: that somewhere in the film Reiner would include the USS Coral Sea (CV-43) baseball cap (which had been modified to say "USS Ooral Sea OV-4B") he wore as Marty DiBergi in This Is Spinal Tap. Reiner was unable to produce the original cap, but did include a similar cap in the grandson's room. Knopfler later said he was joking.

== Reception ==
The film premiered at the Ryerson Theatre in Toronto as part of the 1987 Toronto International Film Festival. It went into wide release later that fall in North America.

=== Box office ===
Unsure how to describe the film's postmodern narrative, Fox promoted it to theaters as a zany comedy and released it without an audience trailer. The film was initially a modest success, grossing $30.8 million in the United States and Canada box office, on a $16 million production budget. Fox head Barry Diller, who wanted the film to be a success over the course of time rather than in its initial release, reassured a frustrated Reiner that the film could find a broader audience in time.

=== Critical response ===
The Princess Bride was critically acclaimed upon release. On Rotten Tomatoes, The Princess Bride holds a 93% approval rating based on 147 reviews. The site's consensus states, "A delightfully postmodern fairy tale, The Princess Bride is a deft, intelligent mix of swashbuckling, romance, and comedy that takes an age-old damsel-in-distress story and makes it fresh." On Metacritic, the film holds a score of 78 out of 100, based on 20 critics, indicating "generally favorable reviews". Audiences surveyed by CinemaScore gave the film a rare grade of "A+" on a scale of A to F. Gene Siskel and Roger Ebert gave the film a "two thumbs up" rating on their television program. Ebert also wrote a very favorable print review in his column for the Chicago Sun-Times. Richard Corliss of Time said the film was fun for the whole family, and later, Time listed the film as one of the "Best of '87". Janet Maslin of The New York Times praised the cast and the sweetness of the film.

The American critic Dalton Mullins praised the film as one of the best love stories ever filmed, writing: "The chemistry between the two leads is palpable and is clear from the first moment they're on screen together. When Buttercup asks Wesley [sic] to do something, the tension of the unspoken love between the two is profound and dense, especially when they were standing face to face right before they professed their undying love for each other." Mullins argued that the phrase "as you wish" sums up the film's philosophy as Westley was willing to suffer any hardship and brave any peril for the woman he loves, which led him to argue the film was a story about "true love". He wrote that the scenes in the swamp were especially effective because the characters have been apart for so long and: "the way Wesley [sic] cradles Buttercup and the affectionate hug has always been a moment that stood out to me because it accentuates the love between the two characters and reinforces the themes of longing and true love". Mullins called the film the "...greatest romantic, fantasy, adventure story. It flawlessly represents love in that it can be a long arduous process but when fought for, it can be the most beautiful, passionate thing and fill you with the most joyful feelings".

=== Legacy ===
The Princess Bride was not a major box-office success, but it became a cult classic after its release to the home video market. The film is widely regarded as eminently quotable. Elwes noted in 2017, on the film's 30th anniversary, that fans still frequently come up to him and quote lines from the movie, usually opening with “As you wish". According to him, Wallace Shawn had it worse because any time he made a small error, like dropping his keys, people would shout "Inconceivable!" at him.

In 2000, readers of Total Film magazine voted The Princess Bride the 38th greatest comedy film of all time. In 2005 The Princess Bride was voted 40th in Channel 4's 100 Greatest Family Films poll ahead of Snow White and the Seven Dwarfs and Beetlejuice and just behind Bugsy Malone and Bedknobs & Broomsticks. In 2006, William Goldman's screenplay was selected by the Writers Guild of America West as the 84th best screenplay of all time; it earned the same ranking in the Guild's 2013 update. The film was selected number 88 on the American Film Institute's (AFI) "AFI's 100 Years... 100 Passions" listing the 100 greatest film love stories of all time. BBC Radio 5's resident film critic, Mark Kermode, is a fan of the film, frequently considering it a model to which similar films aspire.

In December 2011, director Jason Reitman staged a live dramatic reading of The Princess Bride script at the Los Angeles County Museum of Art (LACMA), with Paul Rudd as Westley; Mindy Kaling as Buttercup; Patton Oswalt as Vizzini; Kevin Pollak as Miracle Max; Goran Visnjic as Inigo Montoya; Cary Elwes (switching roles) as Humperdinck; director Rob Reiner as the grandfather; and Fred Savage reprising his role as the grandson. In 2013, director Ari Folman released a live-action animated film titled The Congress, which directly referenced The Princess Bride. Folman's film starred Robin Wright, playing both a live and animated version of herself, as a digitally cloned actress.

In 2014, Cary Elwes wrote As You Wish: Inconceivable Tales from the Making of The Princess Bride, a behind-the-scenes account of the film's production, co-written with Joe Layden. To help Elwes recall the production, Lear sent him a bound copy of the filming's call sheets. The book debuted at No. 3 on the New York Times Bestseller list. In addition to a foreword by director Rob Reiner and a limited edition poster, the book includes exclusive photos and interviews with the cast members from the 25th anniversary cast reunion, as well as unique stories and set secrets from the making of the film. In 2018, Savage reprised his role as The Grandson in a PG-13 version of Deadpool 2 entitled Once Upon a Deadpool, with Deadpool taking the role of The Narrator and reading Deadpool 2's story to him at bedtime and skipping over the more adult parts from the R-rated version. In 2020, a bar themed after the film, named "As You Wish", opened in Chicago. The menu features 16 themed cocktails.

=== Accolades ===
At the 60th Academy Awards it was nominated for Best Original Song for "Storybook Love". At the 15th Saturn Awards it won Best Fantasy Film and Best Costume Design, it was nominated for Best Writing, and Robin Wright was nominated for Best Actress. It won the 1988 Hugo Award for Best Dramatic Presentation and at the 1987 Toronto International Film Festival it won the People's Choice Award. At the 9th Youth in Film Awards Fred Savage won Best Young Actor in a Motion Picture: Drama. At the 4th Artios Awards it was nominated for best Feature Film Casting—Comedy.

== Post-theatrical release ==
In North America, the film was released on VHS and LaserDisc in 1988 by Nelson Entertainment, the latter being a "bare bones" release in unmatted full screen. New Line Home Video reissued the VHS in 1994. The film was also released on Video CD by Philips. The Criterion Collection released a matted widescreen version, bare bones version on laserdisc in 1989, supplementing it with liner notes. In 1997 Criterion re-released the Laserdisc as a "special edition". This edition was widescreen and included an audio commentary by Rob Reiner, William Goldman, Andrew Scheinman, Billy Crystal and Peter Falk (this commentary would also later appear on the Criterion Blu-ray and DVD release); excerpts from the novel read by Rob Reiner; behind the scenes footage; a production scrapbook by unit photographer Clive Coote; design sketches by production designer Norman Garwood; and excerpts from the television series Morton and Hayes, directed by Christopher Guest.

By 1998, MGM had acquired the US home video rights to the film (as part of the pre-1996 PolyGram Filmed Entertainment film library package) and released the film on VHS and DVD. The DVD release featured the soundtrack remastered in Dolby Digital 5.1 with the film in wide and full screen versions, and included the original US theatrical trailer. The next year MGM Home Entertainment re-released the film in another widescreen "special edition", this time with two audio commentaries—one by Rob Reiner, the other by William Goldman—"As You Wish", "Promotional", and "Making Of" featurettes; a "Cary Elwes Video Diary"; the US and UK theatrical trailers; four television spots; a photo gallery; and a collectible booklet.

In 2006, MGM and Sony Pictures Home Entertainment released a two-disc set with varying covers—the "Dread Pirate" and "Buttercup" editions. Each featured their respective character, but had identical features: in addition to the features in the previous release were, the "Dread Pirate Roberts: Greatest Legend of the Seven Seas", "Love is Like a Storybook Story", and "Miraculous Make Up" featurettes, "The Quotable Battle of Wits" game, and Fezzik's "Guide to Florin" booklet. A year later, to commemorate the 20th anniversary of the film, MGM and 20th Century Fox Home Entertainment released the film with flippable cover art featuring the title displayed in an ambigram. This DVD did not include any bonus features from the older editions, but had new short featurettes and a new game. A Blu-ray Disc was released on March 17, 2009, encoded in 5.1 DTS-HD Master Audio. Special features included two audio commentaries, the original theatrical trailer and eight featurettes.

In 2007, the film was released for download in the iTunes Store. The film is available in Europe (DVD Region 2), published by Lions Gate Entertainment. Its extras are the theatrical trailer and text filmographies. The Criterion Collection released the film on Blu-ray and DVD on October 30, 2018. It included a new 4K digital transfer, the same audio commentary from the Criterion LaserDisc release, an edited 1987 audiobook reading of Goldman's novel by director Rob Reiner, new programs on William Goldman's screenplay and tapestry, a new interview with art director Richard Holland, an essay by author Sloane Crosley, and a Blu-ray exclusive book highlighting four screenplays, as well as Goldman's introduction to the 1995 screenplay. Criterion would re-release the film on a 4K/Blu-Ray combo pack on September 3, 2023. The Princess Bride has been made available on May 1, 2020, on The Walt Disney Company's streaming service Disney+.

== Adaptations ==
=== Stage musical ===
It was announced that composer Adam Guettel was working with William Goldman on a musical adaptation of The Princess Bride in 2006. The project was abandoned in February 2007 after Goldman reportedly demanded 75 percent of the author's share, even though Guettel was writing both the music and the lyrics. In late 2013, Disney Theatrical Productions announced that they would adapt a stage musical adaptation of The Princess Bride. A website was launched a couple of months later. In 2016, Rob Reiner said the project was still in development despite "roadblocks" and that Marc Shaiman, Randy Newman and John Mayer had all been approached to write songs, but had turned them down. In June 2019, it was confirmed Rick Elice and Bob Martin were writing the script and David Yazbek was composing the music and lyrics. It was announced on September 14, 2026, that the musical is scheduled to run at the Nederlander Theatre in Chicago from July 19-August 22, 2027. The production is set to feature a book by Bob Martin and Rick Elice, with music and lyrics by Kristen Anderson-Lopez and Robert Lopez. Alex Timbers will direct the production and choreography by Andy Blankenbuehler.

=== Other media ===
In 2018, The Princess Bride was adapted by players of a virtual reality social game, Rec Room, into what is likely to be the world's first full-length virtual reality stage production. The duration of the production was approximately 80 minutes, and ran for a total of four shows.

There have been many board games based on the film, beginning with a promotional roll and move game distributed with an early VHS video release in 1988. In 2008, PlayRoom Entertainment released The Princess Bride: Storming the Castle, a board game based on the film. Since 2013, Game Salute (now Tabletop Tycoon, under the SparkWorks imprint) has published multiple games based on specific scenes from the film, including party game The Princess Bride: Prepare to Die!, card game The Princess Bride: A Battle of Wits, and dice game The Princess Bride: I Hate to Kill You... In 2020, Ravensburger published The Princess Bride Adventure Book Game, a collaborative card and miniatures game with several boards presented as "chapters" of a book. The Princess Bride Game is a casual video game developed and published by New York game development studio Worldwide Biggies.

In June 2020, a "fan made" recreation of The Princess Bride was released on Quibi called Home Movie: The Princess Bride. It was produced by Jason Reitman during the COVID-19 pandemic quarantine in March 2020 with help from an ensemble cast who filmed themselves recreating the various scenes at their homes to raise money for the World Central Kitchen charity. Reitman received backing from Jeffrey Katzenberg for the project, as well as the rights to stream the film on his Quibi service. The "fan-made" film also had approval from Norman Lear and the estate of William Goldman, and Mark Knopfler permitted the use of his music. Rob Reiner approved of the project, even briefly stepping in to play the grandfather. It also features the final performance of Carl Reiner, playing the grandfather in the last scene to his own son. The film was dedicated to his memory as he died days later.

On September 13, 2020, most of the original cast members took part in a virtual live read-through of The Princess Bride script, Princess Bride Reunion, to support the Democratic Party of Wisconsin. The returning cast included Elwes, Wright, Sarandon, Patinkin, Guest, Shawn, Crystal, and Kane, with additional performances by Rob Reiner as the Grandfather, Josh Gad as Fezzik, Eric Idle as the Impressive Clergyman, Whoopi Goldberg as the Ancient Booer and the Mother, King Bach as Yellin, the Assistant Brute and the King, Finn Wolfhard as the Grandson, Shaun Ross as The Man With Albinism, and Jason Reitman as the narrator. Norman Lear joined the Q&A session at the end, which was hosted by Patton Oswalt. Cast members promoted the event beforehand using the hashtags "#PrincessBrideReunion and "#DumpTrumperdinck". More than 110,000 viewers donated a dollar or more to Wisconsin Democrats to view the livestream event. Zen Studios released The Princess Bride table for Pinball FX on August 29, 2024.

== Potential remake ==
In a September 2019 biographical article on Norman Lear in Variety, Sony Pictures Entertainment CEO Tony Vinciquerra, speaking of Lear's works and interest in remaking them, stated, "Very famous people whose names I won't use, but they want to redo The Princess Bride." The reaction to this via social media was very negative, with fans of the film asserting that a remake would be a bad idea and, in reference to the film, "inconceivable". Elwes paraphrased the film, saying, "There's a shortage of perfect movies in this world. It would be a pity to damage this one." Jamie Lee Curtis, Guest's wife, stated "there is only ONE The Princess Bride and it's William Goldman and [Reiner]'s".

== See also ==
- List of cult films
