= List of thriller films of the 2020s =

This is a list of thriller films released in the 2020s.

== 2020 ==
Title	Director	Cast	Country	Subgenre/notes
365 Days	Barbara Białowąs; Tomasz Mandes	Anna-Maria Sieklucka, Michele Morrone, Bronisław Wrocławski, Otar Saralidze, Magdalena Lamparska, Natasza Urbańska	Poland	Erotic thriller
7500	Patrick Vollrath	Joseph Gordon-Levitt, Aylin Tezel	Germany, Austria, United States	Action thriller
Antebellum	Bush + Renz	Janelle Monáe, Eric Lange, Jena Malone, Jack Huston, Kiersey Clemons, Gabourey Sidibe	United States	Horror thriller
Archenemy	Adam Egypt Mortimer	Joe Manganiello, Skylan Brooks, Zolee Griggs, Paul Scheer, Amy Seimetz, Glenn Howerton	United States, United Kingdom	Superhero, mystery, thriller
Asuraguru	A.Raajdheep	Vikram Prabhu, Mahima Nambiar, Subbaraju, Yogi Babu	India	Action thriller
Aswathama	Ramana Teja	Naga Shourya, Mehreen Pirzada	India	Action thriller
Attack	Lakshya Raj Anand	John Abraham, Jacqueline Fernandez, Rakul Preet Singh	India	Action thriller
Ava	Tate Taylor	Jessica Chastain, John Malkovich, Common, Geena Davis, Colin Farrell, Ioan Gruffudd, Joan Chen	United States	Action thriller
Bloodshot	David S. F. Wilson	Vin Diesel, Eiza González, Sam Heughan, Toby Kebbell	United States	Sci-fi, action thriller
The Bloodhound	Patrick Picard	Liam Aiken, Annalise Basso, Joe Adler	United States	Mystery
Dead Reckoning	Andrzej Bartkowiak	KJ Apa, India Eisley, Scott Adkins, James Remar	United States	Action thriller
Earth and Blood	Julien Leclercq	Sami Bouajila, Eriq Ebouaney, Samy Seghir	France	Action thriller
Extraction	Sam Hargrave	Chris Hemsworth, Rudhraksh Jaiswal, Randeep Hooda, Golshifteh Farahani	United States	Action thriller
A Fall From Grace	Tyler Perry	Crystal R. Fox, Phylicia Rashad, Bresha Webb, Cicely Tyson, Tyler Perry	United States	Thriller
Fatale	Deon Taylor	Hilary Swank, Michael Ealy, Mike Colter	United States	Action thriller
Friend of the World	Brian Patrick Butler	Nick Young, Alexandra Slade, Michael C. Burgess, Kathryn Schott, Kevin Smith, Luke Pensabene, Neil Raymond Ricco	United States	Sci-fi thriller
God Father	U. Anbarasan	Natty, Lal, Ananya	India	Action thriller
Honest Thief	Mark Williams	Liam Neeson, Kate Walsh, Jai Courtney, Jeffrey Donovan	United States	Action thriller
Horizon Line	Mikael Marcimain	Alexander Dreymon, Allison Williams	Sweden	Adventure thriller
Malang	Mohit Suri	Aditya Roy Kapur, Disha Patani, Anil Kapoor, Kunal Khemu	India	Action thriller
Monster Hunter	Paul W. S. Anderson	Milla Jovovich, Tony Jaa, Tip "T. I." Harris, Meagan Good	United States	Action thriller
Paydirt	Christian Sesma	Luke Gross, Val Kilmer	United States	Crime thriller
Project Power	Henry Joost, Ariel Schulman	Jamie Foxx, Joseph Gordon-Levitt, Dominique Fishback, Rodrigo Santoro, Colson Baker, Allen Maldonado, Amy Landecker, Courtney B. Vance	United States	Sci-fi action thriller
Songbird	Adam Mason	KJ Apa, Sofia Carson, Craig Robinson, Bradley Whitford, Peter Stormare, Alexandra Daddario, Paul Walter Hauser, Demi Moore	United States	Sci-fi thriller
Spell	Mark Tonderai	Omari Hardwick, Loretta Devine	United States	Supernatural horror thriller
The Crimes That Bind	Sebastián Schindel	Cecilia Roth, Miguel Ángel Solá, Sofía Gala Castiglione	Argentina	Psychological thriller
The Devil All the Time	Antonio Campos	Tom Holland, Bill Skarsgård, Riley Keough, Jason Clarke, Sebastian Stan, Haley Bennett, Eliza Scanlen, Mia Wasikowska, Robert Pattinson	United States	Psychological thriller
The Hunt	Craig Zobel	Ike Barinholtz, Betty Gilpin, Emma Roberts, Hilary Swank	United States	Horror thriller
The Last Days of American Crime	Olivier Megaton	Édgar Ramírez, Anna Brewster, Michael Pitt, Sharlto Copley	United States	Action thriller
The Nest	Sean Durkin	Jude Law, Carrie Coon, Charlie Shotwell, Oona Roche, Adeel Akhtar	United Kingdom, United States, Canada	Psychological thriller
The Night	Kourosh Ahari	Shahab Hosseini, Niousha Noor, Leah Oganyan, George Maguire	United States, Iran	Psychological horror thriller
The Owners	Julius Berg	Maisie Williams, Sylvester McCoy, Rita Tushingham, Jake Curran, Ian Kenny, Andrew Ellis	United Kingdom, United States, France	Horror thriller
The Retreat	Bruce Wemple	Grant Schumacher, Dylan Grunn, Chris Cimperman	United States	Psychological horror thriller
The Rhythm Section	Reed Morano	Blake Lively, Jude Law, Sterling K. Brown	United States	Action thriller
The Tax Collector	David Ayer	Bobby Soto, Cinthya Carmona, George Lopez, Shia LaBeouf	United States	Action-crime thriller
Unknown Origins	David Galán Galindo	Javier Rey, Verónica Echegui, Brays Efe, Antonio Resines	Spain	Crime mystery thriller
V	Mohana Krishna Indraganti	Nani, Sudheer Babu, Nivetha Thomas, Aditi Rao Hydari	India	Action thriller
Walter	U. Anbarasan	Sibi Sathyaraj, Nataraj, Samuthirakani, Shirin Kanchwala	India	Action crime thriller
We Still Say Grace	Brad Helmink; John Rauschelbach	Bruce Davison, Holly Taylor, Rita Volk, Arianne Zucker, Dallas Hart, Frankie Wolf, Xavier J. Watson	United States	Coming-of-age, horror thriller

== 2021 ==
Title	Director	Cast	Country	Subgenre/notes
Akshara	B. Chinni Krishna	Nandita Swetha, Sritej, Shakalaka Shankar, Ajay Ghosh, Satya, Madhunandan	India	Crime thriller
Body Brokers	John Swab	Jack Kilmer, Michael Kenneth Williams, Jessica Rothe, Alice Englert, Peter Greene, Frank Grillo, Melissa Leo	United States	Crime thriller
Cold Case	Tanu Balak	Prithviraj Sukumaran	India	Crime thriller
Copshop	Joe Carnahan	Gerard Butler, Frank Grillo, Alexis Louder	United States	Action thriller
Crime Story	Adam Lipsius	Richard Dreyfuss, Mira Sorvino	United States	Crime drama thriller
Deadly Illusions	Anna Elizabeth James	Kristin Davis, Dermot Mulroney, Greer Grammer, Shanola Hampton	United States	Psychological thriller, drama
Drishyam 2	Jeethu Joseph	Mohanlal, Meena, Ansiba Hassan, Esther Anil	India	Crime drama thriller
Fever Dream	Claudia Llosa	María Valverde, Dolores Fonzi	Chile, Peru, Spain, United States	Psychological thriller
Jagame Thandhiram	Karthik Subbaraj	Dhanush, James Cosmo, Joju George, Aishwarya Lekshmi, Kalaiyarasan, Karpagamoorthy	India	Action thriller
Last Night in Soho	Edgar Wright	Thomasin McKenzie, Anya Taylor-Joy, Matt Smith, Terence Stamp	United Kingdom	Psychological horror-thriller
Lockdown	Moses Inwang	Omotola Jalade-Ekeinde, Tony Umez, Charles Awurum	Nigeria	Psychological thriller
Master	Lokesh Kanagaraj	Vijay, Vijay Sethupathi, Malavika Mohanan, Arjun Das, Andrea Jeremiah, Shanthanu Bhagyaraj	India	Action thriller
My Son	Christian Carion	James McAvoy, Claire Foy	United States	Mystery thriller
Net	Bhargav Macharla	Rahul Ramakrishna, Avika Gor, Praneetha Patnaik, Vishwadev Rachakonda	India	Thriller drama
Nightmare Alley	Guillermo del Toro	Bradley Cooper, Cate Blanchett, Toni Collette, Willem Dafoe, Richard Jenkins, Rooney Mara, Ron Perlman, Mary Steenburgen, David Strathairn	United States	Neo-noir psychological thriller
No Sudden Move	Steven Soderbergh	Don Cheadle, Benicio del Toro, David Harbour, Amy Seimetz, Jon Hamm, Ray Liotta, Kieran Culkin, Noah Jupe, Brendan Fraser, Bill Duke, Frankie Shaw, Julia Fox	United States	Crime thriller
No Time to Die	Cary Joji Fukunaga	Daniel Craig, Rami Malek, Lashana Lynch, Ben Whishaw, Naomie Harris, Jeffrey Wright, Christoph Waltz, Ralph Fiennes	United Kingdom, United States	Action, spy thriller
Nobody	Ilya Naishuller	Bob Odenkirk, Connie Nielsen, RZA, Aleksei Serebryakov, Christopher Lloyd	United States	Action thriller
Oxygen	Alexandre Aja	Mélanie Laurent, Mathieu Amalric, Malik Zidi	United States, France	Sci-fi thriller
Ram	Jeethu Joseph	Mohanlal, Trisha, Indrajith Sukumaran	India	Action thriller
Silk Road	Tiller Russell	Jason Clarke, Nick Robinson, Katie Aselton, Jimmi Simpson, Daniel David Stewart, Darrell Britt-Gibson, Lexi Rabe, Will Ropp, Paul Walter Hauser, Alexandra Shipp	United States	Crime thriller
Son	Ivan Kavanagh	Andi Matichak, Emile Hirsch, Luke David Blumm	Ireland	Supernatural horror thriller
Stowaway	Adam Lipsius	Anna Kendrick, Daniel Dae Kim, Shamier Anderson, Toni Collette	United States	Sci-fi thriller
The Gateway	Michele Civetta	Shea Whigham, Olivia Munn, Zach Avery, Taryn Manning, Mark Boone Junior, Keith David, Frank Grillo, Bruce Dern	United States	Crime thriller
The Hole in the Fence	Joaquin del Paso	Valeria Lamm, Lucciano Kurti, Yubáh Ortega, Erick Walker	Mexico, Poland	Thriller drama
The Last Duel	Ridley Scott	Matt Damon, Adam Driver, Jodie Comer, Ben Affleck	United States	Historical drama-thriller
The Little Things	John Lee Hancock	Denzel Washington, Rami Malek, Jared Leto	United States	Crime thriller
The Night House	David Bruckner	Rebecca Hall, Sarah Goldberg, Stacy Martin, Evan Jonigkeit, Vondie Curtis-Hall	United States	Horror thriller
The Voyeurs	Michael Mohan	Sydney Sweeney, Justice Smith, Ben Hardy, Natasha Liu Bordizzo	United States	Erotic thriller
The Woman in the Window	Joe Wright	Amy Adams, Gary Oldman, Anthony Mackie, Fred Hechinger, Wyatt Russell, Brian Tyree Henry, Jennifer Jason Leigh, Julianne Moore	United States	Psychological thriller
Vanquish	George Gallo	Morgan Freeman, Ruby Rose	United States	Action thriller
Venom: Let There Be Carnage	Andy Serkis	Tom Hardy, Woody Harrelson, Michelle Williams, Reid Scott, Naomi Harris	United States	Superhero, action thriller
Wild Dog	Ashishor Solomon	Nagarjuna, Dia Mirza, Saiyami Kher, Atul Kulkarni	India	Action thriller
Without Remorse	Stefano Sollima	Michael B. Jordan, Jamie Bell, Jodie Turner-Smith, Luke Mitchell, Jack Kesy, Colman Domingo	United States	Action thriller
Wrath of Man	Guy Ritchie	Jason Statham, Holt McCallany, Scott Eastwood, Jeffrey Donovan, Laz Alonso, Josh Hartnett, Post Malone	United States	Action thriller

== 2022 ==
Title	Director	Cast	Country	Subgenre/notes
365 Days: This Day	Barbara Białowąs, Tomasz Mandes	Anna-Maria Sieklucka, Michele Morrone, Rebecca Casiraghi, Magdalena Lamparska	Poland	Erotic thriller
Alice, Darling	Mary Nighy	Anna Kendrick, Kaniehtiio Horn, Charlie Carrick, Wunmi Mosaku	United States, Canada	Thriller
All the Old Knives	Janus Metz Pedersen	Chris Pine, Thandiwe Newton, Jonathan Pryce, Laurence Fishburne	United States	Spy thriller
Ambulance	Michael Bay	Jake Gyllenhaal, Yahya Abdul-Mateen II, Eiza González	United States	Action thriller
Atrapado en mi mente	Richard Santaria Romero	Andrea Luna, Sebastián Stimman	Peru	Psychological thriller
Bed Rest	Lori Evans Taylor	Melissa Barrera, Guy Burnet	United States	Supernatural horror thriller
Beast	Nelson Dilipkumar	Vijay, Pooja Hegde	India	Black comedy action thriller
Beast	Baltasar Kormákur	Idris Elba	American	Nature thriller
Bheemla Nayak	Saagar K Chandra	Pawan Kalyan, Rana Daggubati, Nithya Menen	India	Action thriller
Bullet Train	David Leitch	Brad Pitt, Joey King, Bad Bunny, Andrew Koji, Aaron Taylor-Johnson, Brian Tyree Henry, Zazie Beetz, Masi Oka, Michael Shannon, Lady Gaga, Logan Lerman, Hiroyuki Sanada, Karen Fukuhara	United States	Action thriller
Catwoman: Hunted	Shinsuke Terasawa	Elizabeth Gillies, Stephanie Beatriz, Jonathan Banks, Steve Blum, Lauren Cohan, Keith David, Zehra Fazal, Jonathan Frakes, Kirby Howell-Baptiste, Kelly Hu, Andrew Kishino, Eric Lopez, Jacqueline Obradors, Ron Yuan	United States	Animated superhero, crime thriller
A Day to Die	Wes Miller	Bruce Willis, Frank Grillo, Leon Robinson, Kevin Dillon	United States	Action thriller
Death on the Nile	Kenneth Branagh	Kenneth Branagh, Tom Bateman, Annette Bening, Russell Brand, Ali Fazal, Dawn French, Gal Gadot, Armie Hammer, Rose Leslie, Emma Mackey, Sophie Okonedo, Jennifer Saunders, Letitia Wright	United States, United Kingdom	Mystery thriller
Deep Water	Adrian Lyne	Ben Affleck, Ana de Armas, Tracy Letts, Rachel Blanchard, Lil Rel Howery	United States	Erotic psychological thriller
Don't Worry Darling	Olivia Wilde	Florence Pugh, Harry Styles, Olivia Wilde, Gemma Chan, KiKi Layne, Nick Kroll, Chris Pine	United States	Psychological thriller
Emancipation	Antoine Fuqua	Will Smith, Ben Foster	United States	Historical thriller
KIMI	Steven Soderbergh	Zoë Kravitz, Byron Bowers, Jaime Camil, Jacob Vargas, Devin Ratray	United States	Thriller
Marlowe	Neil Jordan	Liam Neeson, Diane Kruger, Jessica Lange, Adewale Akinnuoye-Agbaje, Alan Cumming, Danny Huston, Ian Hart, Colm Meaney, Daniela Melchior, François Arnaud	United States	Neo-nior thriller
Master	Mariama Diallo	Regina Hall, Zoe Renee, Amber Gray, Molly Bernard, Nike Kadri	United States	Thriller
Memory	Martin Campbell	Liam Neeson, Guy Pearce, Monica Bellucci, Harold Torres, Taj Atwal, Ray Fearon	United States	Action thriller
Mr. Harrigan's Phone	John Lee Hancock	Jaeden Martell, Donald Sutherland, Kirby Howell-Baptiste, Joe Tippett	United States	Horror thriller
Prey	Dan Trachtenberg	Amber Midthunder, Dane DiLiegro	United States	Sci-fi, action thriller
Run Sweetheart Run	Shana Feste	Ella Balinska, Pilou Asbæk, Clark Gregg, Aml Ameen, Dayo Okeniyi, Betsy Brandt, Shohreh Aghdashloo	United States	Thriller
Salaar	Prashanth Neel	Prabhas, Shruti Haasan	India	Action thriller
Samaritan	Julius Avery	Sylvester Stallone, Martin Starr, Moisés Arias, Dascha Polanco	United States	Superhero thriller
Scream	Matt Bettinelli-Olpin; Tyler Gillett	Melissa Barrera, Jenna Ortega Mason Gooding, Dylan Minnette, Jack Quaid, Marley Shelton, Courteney Cox, David Arquette, Neve Campbell	United States	Slasher thriller
The 355	Simon Kinberg	Jessica Chastain, Lupita Nyong'o, Penélope Cruz, Diane Kruger, Fan Bingbing, Sebastian Stan, Édgar Ramírez	United States	Action thriller
The Batman	Matt Reeves	Robert Pattinson, Zoë Kravitz, Paul Dano, Jeffrey Wright, John Turturro, Peter Sarsgaard, Jayme Lawson, Andy Serkis, Colin Farrell	United States	Superhero, action, crime thriller
The Black Phone	Scott Derrickson	Jeremy Davies, Ethan Hawke, James Ransone	United States	Horror-thriller
The Contractor	Tarik Saleh	Chris Pine, Ben Foster, Kiefer Sutherland, Eddie Marsan, Gillian Jacobs	United States	Action thriller
The Devil's Light	Daniel Stamm	Virginia Madsen, Ben Cross, Colin Salmon, Jacqueline Byers	United States	Supernatural horror thriller
The Gray Man	Anthony Russo, Joe Russo	Ryan Gosling, Chris Evans, Ana de Armas, Jessica Henwick, Dhanush, Julia Butters, Regé-Jean Page, Billy Bob Thornton, Alfre Woodard	United States	Action thriller
The Northman	Robert Eggers	Alexander Skarsgård, Nicole Kidman, Anya Taylor-Joy, Björk, Ralph Ineson, Ethan Hawke, Willem Dafoe, Kate Dickie	United States	Historical thriller
The Pale Blue Eye	Scott Cooper	Christian Bale, Harry Melling, Gillian Anderson, Robert Duvall, Timothy Spall, Lucy Boynton, Charlotte Gainsbourg, Toby Jones, Harry Lawtey	United States	Gothic horror-thriller
Valimai	H. Vinoth	Ajith Kumar, Huma Qureshi, Kartikeya Gummakonda	India	Action thriller
Vengeance	B.J. Novak	B. J. Novak, Boyd Holbrook, J. Smith-Cameron, Lio Tipton, Dove Cameron, Issa Rae, Ashton Kutcher	United States	Black comedy, mystery thriller
Vikram	Lokesh Kanagaraj	Kamal Haasan, Vijay Sethupathi, Fahadh Faasil	India	Action thriller
Violent Night	Tommy Wirkola	David Harbour, John Leguizamo, Beverly D'Angelo, Alex Hassell, Alexis Louder	United States	Holiday action thriller
Where the Crawdads Sing	Olivia Newman	Daisy Edgar-Jones, Taylor John Smith, Harris Dickinson, David Strathairn, Jayson Warner Smith	United States	Suspense thriller, drama

== 2023 ==
Title	Director	Cast	Country	Subgenre/notes
65	Scott Beck, Bryan Woods	Adam Driver, Ariana Greenblatt, Chloe Coleman	United States	Sci-fi action thriller
Betrayal	Rodger Griffiths	James Harkness, Brian Vernel, Daniel Portman, Paul Higgins, Calum Ross, Joanne Thomson, Anita Vettesse	United Kingdom	psychological horror, survival film
City of Love	Èric Boadella	Robert DeCesare, Kathryn Schott, Taylor Nichols, Mario Tardón	United States	Neo noir thriller
Cocaine Bear	Elizabeth Banks	Keri Russell, O'Shea Jackson Jr., Alden Ehrenreich, Jesse Tyler Ferguson, Kristofer Hivju, Christian Convery, Brooklynn Prince, Margo Martindale, Ray Liotta	United States	Thriller
Cobweb	Samuel Bodin	Lizzy Caplan, Antony Starr, Cleopatra Coleman, Woody Norman	United States	Horror-thriller
Customs Frontline	Herman Yau	Jacky Cheung, Nicholas Tse, Karena Lam, Cya Liu, Francis Ng	Hong Kong	Action thriller
Eigengrau Half-Life	Christopher. C. Arkley	Dylan Allcock, Ben Whitehead, Katie Buchanan, Christopher. C. Arkley, Adam Reilly, Joe Buchanan, Russel Bury	United Kingdom	
Eileen	William Oldroyd	Anne Hathaway, Thomasin McKenzie, Shea Whigham	United States	Period psychological-thriller
Expend4bles	Scott Waugh	Sylvester Stallone, Jason Statham, Dolph Lundgren, Randy Couture, Megan Fox 50 Cent, Andy Garcia, Tony Jaa, Eddie Hall, Sheila Shah, Jacob Scipio, Levy Tran, Iko Uwais	United States	Action thriller
Extraction 2	Sam Hargrave	Chris Hemsworth, Golshifteh Farahani, Adam Bessa, Daniel Bernhardt, Tinatin Dalakishvili	United States	Action thriller
Finestkind	Brian Helgeland	Ben Foster, Toby Wallace, Jenna Ortega, Tommy Lee Jones	United States	Crime thriller, drama
A Haunting in Venice	Kenneth Branagh	Kenneth Branagh, Kyle Allen, Camille Cottin, Jamie Dornan, Tina Fey, Jude Hill, Ali Rehman Khan, Emma Laird, Kelly Reilly, Riccardo Scamarcio, Michelle Yeoh	United Kingdom, United States	Mystery thriller
Heart of Stone	Tom Harper	Gal Gadot, Sophie Okonedo, Jamie Dornan	United States	Action, spy thriller
Hemet, or the Landlady Don't Drink Tea	Tony Olmos	Kimberly Weinberger, Brian Patrick Butler, Aimee La Joie, Randy Davison, Merrick McCartha, Matthew Rhodes, Nick Young, Pierce Wallace, Derrick Acosta, Mark Atkinson	United States	Crime thriller, dark comedy
John Wick: Chapter 4	Chad Stahelski	Keanu Reeves, Laurence Fishburne, Rina Sawayama, Lance Reddick, Ian McShane	United States	Action thriller
Khaos	Dante Rubio Rodrigo	Dante Rubio Rodrigo, Isaías Saldaña, Thalía Díaz, Dayana Rivera, Esther Muñoz	Peru	Thriller
Knock at the Cabin	M. Night Shyamalan	Dave Bautista, Jonathan Groff, Ben Aldridge, Nikki Amuka-Bird, Kristen Cui, Abby Quinn, Rupert Grint	United States	Post-apocalyptic horror thriller
Leave the World Behind	Sam Esmail	Julia Roberts, Mahershala Ali, Ethan Hawke, Myha'la, Kevin Bacon	United States	Apocalyptic psychological thriller
Luther: The Fallen Sun	Jamie Payne	Idris Elba, Cynthia Erivo, Andy Serkis	United Kingdom, United States	Crime drama
M3GAN	Gerard Johnstone	Allison Williams, Violet McGraw, Ronny Chieng	United States	Sci-fi horror thriller
Meg 2: The Trench	Ben Wheatley	Jason Statham, Sienna Guillory, Wu Jing, Skyler Samuels, Sergio Peris-Mencheta, Cliff Curtis, Sophia Cai, Page Kennedy	United States, China	Sci-fi, action thriller
Mission: Impossible – Dead Reckoning Part One	Christopher McQuarrie	Tom Cruise, Ving Rhames, Simon Pegg, Rebecca Ferguson, Vanessa Kirby, Hayley Atwell, Pom Klementieff, Shea Whigham, Esai Morales, Henry Czerny, Cary Elwes	United States	Action, spy thriller
No One Will Save You	Brian Duffield	Kaitlyn Dever	United States	Sci-fi thriller
Oppenheimer	Christopher Nolan	Cillian Murphy, Emily Blunt, Matt Damon, Robert Downey Jr., Florence Pugh, Josh Hartnett, Casey Affleck, Rami Malek, Kenneth Branagh	United States, United Kingdom	Epic biographical thriller
Operation Fortune: Ruse de Guerre	Guy Ritchie	Jason Statham, Aubrey Plaza, Bugzy Malone, Josh Hartnett, Cary Elwes, Hugh Grant	United States	Action thriller
Plane	Jean-François Richet	Gerard Butler, Mike Colter, Tony Goldwyn	United States	Action thriller
Reptile	Grant Singer	Benicio del Toro, Justin Timberlake, Alicia Silverstone	United States	Crime thriller
Run Rabbit Run	Daina Reid	Sarah Snook, Damon Herriman, Greta Scacchi, Lily LaTorre, Trevor Jamieson, Neil Melville, Naomi Rukavina, Georgina Naidu, Genevieve Morris, Katherine Slattery, Sunny Whelan	United States, Australia	Psychological thriller
Saltburn	Emerald Fennell	Barry Keoghan, Jacob Elordi, Rosamund Pike, Richard E. Grant, Alison Oliver, Archie Madekwe	United Kingdom, United States	Psychological thriller drama
Saw X	Kevin Greutert	Tobin Bell, Shawnee Smith, Synnøve Macody Lund, Steven Brand, Michael Beach, Renata Vaca	United States	Horror thriller
Scream VI	Matt Bettinelli-Olpin, Tyler Gillett	Melissa Barrera, Mason Gooding, Jenna Ortega, Hayden Panettiere, Jasmin Savoy Brown, Courteney Cox	United States	Slasher thriller
Sound of Freedom	Alejandro Monteverde	Jim Caviezel, Mira Sorvino, Bill Camp	United States	Crime thriller, biographical drama
The Equalizer 3	Antoine Fuqua	Denzel Washington, Dakota Fanning	United States	Vigilante action thriller
The Killer	David Fincher	Michael Fassbender, Tilda Swinton	United States	Crime thriller
The Marsh King's Daughter	Neil Burger	Daisy Ridley, Ben Mendelsohn, Garrett Hedlund, Caren Pistorius, Brooklynn Prince, Gil Birmingham	United States	Psychological thriller
The Resurrection of Charles Manson	Remy Grillo	Frank Grillo, Jaime King, Katherine Hughes, Josh Plasse, Will Peltz, Sarah Dumont, Sydelle Noel	United States	Horror-thriller
The Vanishing Soldier	Dani Rosenberg	Ido Tako, Mika Reiss, Efrat Ben Zur, Tiki Dayan, Shmulik Cohen	Israel	War drama thriller

== 2024 ==
Title	Director	Cast	Country	Subgenre/notes
Air Force One Down	James Bamford	Katherine McNamara, Ian Bohen, Dascha Polanco, Rade Šerbedžija, Paul S. Tracey, Anthony Michael Hall	United States	Action thriller
Argylle	Matthew Vaughn	Henry Cavill, Bryce Dallas Howard, Sam Rockwell, Bryan Cranston, Catherine O'Hara, Dua Lipa, Ariana DeBose, John Cena, Samuel L. Jackson	United States	Action thriller comedy
Armor	Justin Routt	Sylvester Stallone, Jason Patric, Josh Wiggins, Dash Mihok	United States	Action thriller
Article 370	Aditya Suhas Jambhale	Yami Gautam Dhar, Priyamani	India	Action thriller
Blink Twice	Zoë Kravitz	Naomi Ackie, Channing Tatum, Simon Rex, Alia Shawkat, Adria Arjona, Haley Joel Osment, Christian Slater, Geena Davis, Kyle MacLachlan	United States	Thriller
Caddo Lake	Celine Held, Logan George	Dylan O'Brien, Eliza Scanlen	United States	Thriller
Carry-On	Jaume Collet-Serra	Taron Egerton, Jason Bateman, Logan Marshall-Green, Sofia Carson, Theo Rossi, Dean Norris	United States	Action thriller
The Correspondent	Kriv Stenders	Richard Roxburgh, Julian Maroun, Rahel Romahn, Yael Stone, Nicholas Cassim, Mojean Aria, Fayssal Bazzi	Australia	Biographical legal thriller
Flight Risk	Mel Gibson	Mark Wahlberg, Topher Grace, Michelle Dockery	United States	Thriller
Furiosa: A Mad Max Saga	George Miller	Anya Taylor-Joy, Chris Hemsworth, Tom Burke	Australia, United States	Post-apocalyptic action thriller
Hold Your Breath	Will Joines, Karrie Crouse	Sarah Paulson, Annaleigh Ashford, Ebon Moss-Bachrach, Bill Heck, Amiah Miller	United States	Psychological horror-thriller
Humane	Caitlin Cronenberg	Jay Baruchel, Emily Hampshire, Peter Gallagher	Canada, Belgium	Dystopian thriller
Lift	F. Gary Gray	Kevin Hart, Sam Worthington, Burn Gorman, Jean Reno, Jacob Batalon, Gugu Mbatha-Raw, Vincent D'Onofrio, Billy Magnussen, Úrsula Corberó, Yun Jee Kim, Viveik Kalra, Paul Anderson	United States	Heist thriller, action comedy
Kraven the Hunter	J. C. Chandor	Aaron Taylor-Johnson, Russell Crowe, Fred Hechinger, Ariana DeBose, Alessandro Nivola	United States	Superhero thriller
Magpie	Sam Yates	Daisy Ridley, Shazad Latif, Matilda Lutz	United Kingdom	Noir thriller
Miller's Girl	Jade Halley Bartlett	Jenna Ortega, Martin Freeman, Dagmara Domińczyk, Bashir Salahuddin, Gideon Adlon	United States	Erotic thriller
Monkey Man	Dev Patel	Dev Patel, Sharlto Copley, Pitobash, Vipin, Sharma, Sikandar Kher, Adithi Kalkunte, Makrand Deshpande, Zakir Hussain	Canada, United States	Action thriller
Never Let Go	Alexandre Aja	Halle Berry, Percy Daggs IV, Anthony B. Jenkins, Matthew Kevin Anderson, Christin Park, Stephanie Lavigne	United States	Survival horror-thriller
Night Swim	Bryce McGuire	Wyatt Russell, Kerry Condon	United States	Horror thriller
Please Don't Feed the Children	Destry Allyn Spielberg	Michelle Dockery, Regan Aliyah, Zoe Colletti, Andrew Liner, Joshuah Melnick, Emma Meisel, Dean Scott Vazquez, Giancarlo Esposito	United States	Psychological thriller
Revolver	Oh Seung Uk	Ji Chang-wook, Jeon Do-yeon	South Korea	Action thriller
Speak No Evil	James Watkins	James McAvoy, Mackenzie Davis, Scoot McNairy, Alix West Lefler	United States	Psychological horror-thriller
The Surfer	Lorcan Finnegan	Nicolas Cage, Julian McMahon, Nicholas Cassim, Miranda Tapsell, Alexander Bertrand, Justin Rosniak, Rahel Romahn, Finn Little, Charlotte Maggi	Ireland, Australia	Psychological thriller
The Beekeeper	David Ayer	Jason Statham, Emmy Raver-Lampman, Josh Hutcherson, Bobby Naderi, Minnie Driver, Phylicia Rashad, Jeremy Irons	United States	Action thriller
The Bricklayer	Renny Harlin	Aaron Eckhart, Nina Dobrev, Tim Blake Nelson, Ilfenesh Hadera, Clifton Collins Jr.	United States	Action thriller
The Fall Guy	David Leitch	Ryan Gosling, Emily Blunt, Aaron Taylor-Johnson, Stephanie Hsu	United States	Action thriller
The Home	James DeMonaco	Pete Davidson	United States	Psychological horror thriller
The Instigators	Doug Liman	Matt Damon, Casey Affleck, Hong Chau, Paul Walter Hauser, Michael Stuhlbarg, Jack Harlow, Toby Jones, Ving Rhames, Alfred Molina, Ron Perlman	United States	Heist thriller
The Killer's Game	J.J. Perry	Dave Bautista, Sofia Boutella, Terry Crews, Scott Adkins, Pom Klementieff, Ben Kingsley	United States	Action thriller
The Order	Justin Kurzel	Jude Law, Nicholas Hoult, Tye Sheridan, Jurnee Smollett, Marc Maron	United States	Biographical crime thriller
The Union	Julian Farino	Mark Wahlberg, Halle Berry, J.K. Simmons, Jackie Earle Haley, Adewale Akinnuoye-Agbaje, Jessica De Gouw, Alice Lee	United States	Action spy thriller
Trigger Warning	Mouly Surya	Jessica Alba, Anthony Michael Hall	United States	Action thriller
Woman of the Hour	Anna Kendrick	Anna Kendrick, Daniel Zovatto, Tony Hale, Nicolette Robinson, Kathryn Gallagher, Kelley Jakle, Autumn Best	United States	Biographical crime thriller
Yodha	Sagar Ambre; Pushkar Ojha	Sidharth Malhotra, Raashii Khanna, Disha Patani	India	Action thriller

== 2025 ==
Title	Director	Cast	Country	Subgenre/notes
A Working Man	David Ayer	Jason Statham, David Harbour, Michael Peña, Jason Flemyng, Arianna Rivas	United States	Action thriller
Alarum	Michael Polish	Sylvester Stallone, Scott Eastwood, Willa Fitzgerald, Mike Colter, Ísis Valverde, D. W. Moffett	United States	Action crime thriller
Anniversary	Jan Komasa	Diane Lane, Kyle Chandler, Madeline Brewer, Zoey Deutch, Phoebe Dynevor, Mckenna Grace, Daryl McCormack	United States	Suspense thriller
Another Simple Favor	Paul Feig	Anna Kendrick, Blake Lively, Henry Golding, Andrew Rannells, Bashir Salahuddin, Kelly McCormack, Elena Sofia Ricci, Michele Morrone, Elizabeth Perkins, Alex Newell, Taylor Ortega, Allison Janney, Aparna Nancherla	United States	Black comedy crime thriller
Ballerina	Len Wiseman	Ana de Armas, Ian McShane, Keanu Reeves, Lance Reddick, Anjelica Huston, Gabriel Byrne, Norman Reedus, Catalina Sandino Moreno	United States	Action thriller
Black Bag	Steven Soderbergh	Cate Blanchett, Michael Fassbender, Regé-Jean Page, Marisa Abela, Naomie Harris, Pierce Brosnan, Tom Burke	United States	Spy thriller drama
Caught Stealing	Darren Aronofsky	Austin Butler, Regina King, Zoë Kravitz, Matt Smith, Liev Schreiber, Vincent D'Onofrio, Griffin Dunne, Bad Bunny, Carol Kane	United States	Biographical drama, crime thriller, comedy
Chavín De Huántar: The Rescue of the Century	Diego de León	Rodrigo Sánchez Patiño	Peru	Historical action thriller
C O.G.	Tommy Savas	Piper Curda, Josh Zuckerman, Noel Fisher	United States	sci-fi horror
Companion	Drew Hancock	Sophie Thatcher, Jack Quaid, Lukas Gage, Megan Suri, Harvey Guillén, Rupert Friend	United States	Sci-fi thriller
Dead Man's Wire	Gus Van Sant	Bill Skarsgård, Dacre Montgomery, Colman Domingo, Myha'la Herrold, Cary Elwes, John Robinson, Al Pacino	United States	Historical crime drama thriller
Drop	Christopher Landon	Meghann Fahy, Brandon Sklenar, Violett Beane, Jacob Robinson, Ed Weeks	United States	Thriller
Echo Valley	Michael Pearce	Julianne Moore, Sydney Sweeney, Domhnall Gleeson, Kyle MacLachlan, Fiona Shaw	United States	Drama thriller
Guru	Yann Gozlan	Pierre Niney, Marion Barbeau, Anthony Bajon, Holt McCallany	France	Psychological thriller
I Know What You Did Last Summer	Jennifer Kaytin Robinson	Madelyn Cline, Chase Sui Wonders, Jonah Hauer-King, Tyriq Withers, Sarah Pidgeon, Billy Campbell, Gabbriette Bechtel, Austin Nichols, Freddie Prinze Jr., Jennifer Love Hewitt	United States	Slasher thriller
Last Breath	Alex Parkinson	Woody Harrelson, Simu Liu, Finn Cole, Djimon Hounsou	United States	Survival thriller
LifeHack	Ronan Corrigan	Georgie Farmer, Yasmin Finney, Roman Hayeck-Green, James Scholz, Jessica Reynolds, Charlie Creed-Miles, Cael King, Jill Winternitz	United Kingdom	screenlife, action
Lifeline	Feras Alfuqaha	Josh Stewart, Judah Lewis, Craig Stark, Charlene Amoia, Luke Benwa, August Maturo, Brecken Merrill	United States	Mystery
M3GAN 2.0	Gerard Johnstone	Allison Williams, Violet McGraw, Ivanna Sakhno, Jemaine Clement	United States	Sci-fi, action thriller
Mission: Impossible – The Final Reckoning	Christopher McQuarrie	Tom Cruise, Ving Rhames, Simon Pegg, Rebecca Ferguson, Vanessa Kirby, Hayley Atwell, Pom Klementieff, Shea Whigham, Esai Morales, Henry Czerny	United States	Action, spy thriller
Not Without Hope	Joe Carnahan	Zachary Levi, Josh Duhamel, JoBeth Williams	United States	Survival thriller
Novocaine	Dan Berk, Robert Olsen	Jack Quaid, Amber Midthunder, Ray Nicholson, Jacob Batalon, Betty Gabriel, Matt Walsh	United States	Action thriller
Shadow Force	Joe Carnahan	Omar Sy, Kerry Washington, Da’Vine Joy Randolph, Method Man, Mark Strong, Jahleel Kamara, Krondon, Natalia Reyes, Yoson An, Ed Quinn	United States	Action thriller
Site	Jason Eric Perlman	Jake McLaughlin, Theo Rossi, Miki Ishikawa, Arielle Kebbel	United States	Science fiction
Street Wanderers	Juan Martín Hsu	Victoria Almeida, Andrés Tan He, Yuchen Che, Chien Min Lee, Yam Pin Kon, Willy Kon Chin Yi, Alex Kawen León Yee, Emilio Chau Chiu	Argentina, Peru	Crime thriller
The Accountant 2	Gavin O'Connor	Ben Affleck, Jon Bernthal, J. K. Simmons, Cynthia Addai-Robinson, Daniella Pineda	United States	Action crime thriller
The Amateur	James Hawes	Rami Malek, Rachel Brosnahan, Caitríona Balfe, Adrian Martinez, Laurence Fishburne, Holt McCallany, Julianne Nicholson	United States	Spy thriller
The Plague	Charlie Poling	Joel Edgerton, Everett Blunck, Kayo Martin, Kenny Rasmussen	United States	psychological, drama
The Running Man	Edgar Wright	Glen Powell, Katy O'Brian, Daniel Ezra, Karl Glusman, Josh Brolin, Lee Pace, Jayme Lawson, Michael Cera, Emilia Jones, William H. Macy, David Zayas, Sean Hayes, Colman Domingo	United States	Dystopian thriller
The Woman in the Yard	Jaume Collet-Serra	Danielle Deadwyler, Russell Hornsby, Okwui Okpokwasili, Peyton Jackson, Estella Kahiha	United States	Horror thriller
Until Dawn	David F. Sandberg	Ella Rubin, Michael Cimino, Odessa A'zion, Ji-young Yoo, Belmont Cameli, Maia Mitchell, Peter Stormare	United States	Horror-suspense thriller
Valiant One	Steve Barnett	Chase Stokes, Lana Condor, Desmin Borges, Callan Mulvey, Jonathan Whitesell, Daniel Jun	United States	Action thriller
Weapons	Zach Cregger	Josh Brolin, Julia Garner, Alden Ehrenreich, Benedict Wong, Austin Abrams, Amy Madigan, June Diane Raphael	United States	Horror thriller

== 2026 ==
Title	Director	Cast	Country	Subgenre/notes
Animal	Ben Affleck	Ben Affleck, Kerry Washington, Gillian Anderson, Adriana Paz with Luis Gerardo Méndez, Steven Yeun	United States	Crime thriller
Apex	Baltasar Kormákur	Charlize Theron, Taron Egerton, Eric Bana	United States	Action thriller
Crime 101	Bart Layton	Chris Hemsworth, Mark Ruffalo, Barry Keoghan, Halle Berry, Monica Barbaro, Corey Hawkins, Tate Donovan, Devon Bostick, Jennifer Jason Leigh, Nick Nolte	United States	Crime thriller
The Devil's Mouth	Jeff Wadlow	Kathryn Newton, Lana Condor, Gavin Casalegno, Nico Hiraga, Tommi Rose, Tayme Thapthimthong	United States	Survival thriller
The Gallerist	Cathy Yan	Natalie Portman, Jenna Ortega, Sterling K. Brown, Zach Galifianakis, Da'Vine Joy Randolph, Catherine Zeta-Jones	United States	Dark comedy, crime thriller
Heart of the Beast	David Ayer	Brad Pitt	United States	Suspense thriller
In the Grey	Guy Ritchie	Jake Gyllenhaal, Henry Cavill, Eiza González, Kristofer Hivju, Fisher Stevens, Rosamund Pike	United States	Action thriller
Jana Nayagan	H. Vinoth	Vijay, Pooja Hegde, Bobby Deol, Prakash Raj, Gautham Vasudev Menon	India	Political thriller, action
Karma	Guillaume Canet	Marion Cotillard, Leonardo Sbaraglia, Luis Zahera, Denis Ménochet	France	Psychological thriller
Mercy	Timur Bekmambetov	Chris Pratt, Rebecca Ferguson, Annabelle Wallis	United States	Sci-fi thriller
Mutiny	Jean-François Richet	Jason Statham, Annabelle Wallis, Roland Møller, Jason Wong	United Kingdom, United States	Action thriller
Onslaught	Adam Wingard	Adria Arjona, Dan Stevens, Alex Pereira, Drew Starkey, Rebecca Hall, Michael Biehn, Eric Wareheim, Reginald VelJohnson	United States	Action horror thriller
Pretty Lethal	Vicky Jewson	Iris Apatow, Lana Condor, Millicent Simmonds, Avantika, Maddie Ziegler, Michael Culkin, Lydia Leonard, Uma Thurman	United States	Action thriller
The RIP	Joe Carnahan	Matt Damon, Ben Affleck, Steven Yeun, Teyana Taylor, Catalina Sandino Moreno, Sasha Calle, Néstor Carbonell, Lina Esco, Scott Adkins, Kyle Chandler	United States	Action crime thriller
Scream 7	Kevin Williamson	Neve Campbell, Courteney Cox, Mason Gooding, Jasmin Savoy Brown, Roger L. Jackson, Isabel May, Joel McHale, David Arquette	United States	Slasher thriller
Send Help	Sam Raimi	Rachel McAdams, Chris Pang, Dylan O'Brien, Dennis Haysbert, Bruce Campbell	United States	Survival horror thriller
Violent Night 2	Tommy Wirkola	David Harbour, Daniela Melchior, Kristen Bell, Jared Harris, Joe Pantoliano, Maxwell Friedman, Andrew Bachelor	United States	Action thriller comedy
Whalefall	Brian Duffield	Austin Abrams, Josh Brolin, Elisabeth Shue, John Ortiz, Jane Levy, Emily Rudd	United States	Survival thriller

== 2027 ==
Title	Director	Cast	Country	Subgenre/notes
The Beekeeper 2	Timo Tjahjanto	Jason Statham, Emmy Raver-Lampman, Bobby Naderi, Jemma Redgrave, Jeremy Irons, Yara Shahidi, Pom Klementieff, Adam Copeland	United States	Action thriller
Blood on Snow	Cary Joji Fukunaga	Aaron Taylor-Johnson, Benedict Cumberbatch, Eva Green, Emma Laird, Ben Mendelsohn	United States	Crime thriller
Cliffhanger	Jaume Collet-Serra	Lily James, Nell Tiger Free, Franz Rogowski, Pierce Brosnan	United States	Action thriller
F.A.S.T.	Ben Richardson	Brandon Sklenar, Juliana Canfield, LaKeith Stanfield, Jason Clarke, Sam Claflin, Trevante Rhodes, Chloe Coleman	United States	Action crime thriller
Pendulum	Mark Heyman	Joseph Gordon-Levitt, Phoebe Dynevor, Norman Reedus	United States	Horror mystery thriller
Remain	M. Night Shyamalan	Jake Gyllenhaal, Phoebe Dynevor, Ashley Walters, Julie Hagerty, Jay O. Sanders	United States	Romance thriller
The Rescue	Potsy Ponciroli	Brandon Sklenar, Josh Lucas, Hassie Harrison, Lorelei Olivia Mote, Nick Searcy, Austin Amelio, Spencer Treat Clark, Tim Blake Nelson, Josh Duhamel	United States	Western thriller
Seasons	Drew Hancock	Lily James, Jack Reynor, Ron Perlman, Elizabeth McGovern, Wes Studi, Dane DiLiegro	United States	Horror thriller
Shiver	Tim Miller	Keanu Reeves, Callie Cooke, Steven Waddington, Stefan Kapičić, Abraham Popoola	United States	Sci-fi survival thriller
The Thomas Crown Affair	Michael B. Jordan	Michael B. Jordan, Kenneth Branagh, Adria Arjona, Lily Gladstone, Danai Gurira, Pilou Asbæk	United States	Romance heist thriller
Wife & Dog	Guy Ritchie	Benedict Cumberbatch, Rosamund Pike, Cosmo Jarvis, James Norton, Paddy Considine, Anthony Hopkins	United States	Action thriller

== 2028 ==
Title	Director	Cast	Country	Subgenre/notes
The Batman: Part II	Matt Reeves	Robert Pattinson	United States	Superhero, crime thriller
The Flood	Zach Cregger	Jennifer Lawrence	United States	Sci-fi thriller

== Forthcoming ==
Title	Director	Cast	Country	Subgenre/notes
16 States	Fede Álvarez		United States	Zombie thriller
Alice + Freda Forever	Jennifer Kent		United States	Psychological crime thriller
American Criminal	Gavin O'Connor		United States	Crime thriller
Armored	TBA		United States	Action thriller
Bang!	David Leitch	Idris Elba	United States	Action thriller
Be My Eyes	Lars Klevberg		United States	Crime thriller
Bethesda	Andrew Lewis, Isaac Lewis	Max Martini, Brianna Hildebrand, James Landry Hébert, Julio Cesar Cedillo, Verónica Falcón, Marlene Forte, Drew Van Acker, Mark Ashworth	United States	Neo-Western thriller
Black 5	Michael Bay		United States	Sci-fi action thriller
Blood Count	Peter Ramsey		United States	Neo-nior vampire thriller
Blurred	Ben Cookson	Alex Pettyfer, Guy Pearce, María Pedraza, Adewale Akinnuoye-Agbaje	United States	Erotic thriller
Caves of Steel	John Ridley		United States	Sci-fi mystery
Dark Days at the Magna Carta	TBA	Blake Lively	United States	Post-apocalptic thriller
Delilah	Alexis Ostrander		United States	Psychological thriller
Dollhouse	Emma Tammi	Selena Gomez	United States	Psychological horror-thriller
Elijah	Alexandre Aja		United States	Horror thriller
Face/Off 2	Adam Wingard		United States	Sci-fi, action thriller
Flight	Johannes Roberts		United States	Suspense thriller
Good People, Bad Things	Ninian Doff	Issa Rae	United States	Comedy thriller
Head Games	Anthony Mandler	Samuel L. Jackson, Henry Golding	United States	Sci-fi thriller
Howdy, Neighbor	Allisyn Snyder	Matthew Scott Montgomery, Grant Jordan, Debby Ryan, Alyson Stoner, Kevin Chamberlin, Tim Bagley, Shayne Topp, Damien Haas	United States	Horror-thriller
I Am Not Alone	Misha Green	Jessica Chastain	United States	Sci-fi thriller
I Heart Murder	Matt Spicer	Phoebe Dynevor	United States	Thriller
Ice Fall	Stefan Ruzowitzky		United States	Crime thriller
Kate Warne	Jaume Collet-Serra	Emily Blunt	United States	Western, action thriller
Kill Them All	Sam Hargrave		United States	Action thriller
Lady Killer	Diablo Cody	Blake Lively	United States	Crime thriller
Leap	Mohamed Diab		United States	Sci-fi thriller
Mad Max: The Wasteland	George Miller	Tom Hardy	Australia, United States	Action thriller
Metal Gear	Zach Lipovsky, Adam Stein		United States	Action adventure, sci-fi spy thriller
Mind Fall	Mathieu Kassovitz	Daisy Ridley	United States	Sci-fi crime thriller
Mystery Girl	McG	Tiffany Haddish	United States	Action crime drama, mystery thriller
Night Has Fallen	Ric Roman Waugh	Gerard Butler	United States	Action thriller
Off the Grid	Johnny Martin	Josh Duhamel, Greg Kinnear	United States	Action thriller
Open Wounds	Ronald Krauss	Jack Kilmer, Paris Jackson, Eric Roberts, Lambert Houston, Renata Notni, Richie Radichi, Jay Giannone	United States	Horror thriller
Planet Kill	Steven Soderbergh		United States	Action thriller
Play Dead	Jaume Collet-Serra	Noah Jupe, Matthias Schweighöfer, Patrick Gibson, Andreas Pietschmann, Sean Keenan, Joel Jackson	United States	Psychological thriller
Protégé	TBA		United States	Action thriller
Raider	Jesse V. Johnson		United States	Action thriller
Red Dirt	Crash Buist	Aaron Dominguez, Melissa Fumero, Alejandro Edda, Carlos Pratts	United States	Action thriller
Red Shirt	David Leitch	Channing Tatum	United States	Action spy thriller
Rest Stop	Alex Ross Perry		United States	Thriller
Reunion	Matt Bettinelli-Olpin, Tyler Gillett		United States	High school monster thriller
Sabine	Jesus Colmenar		United States	Psychological crime thriller
Sanctuary	TBA		United States	Action thriller
Self Storage	Jay Bonansinga	Chris Jericho	United States	Psychological thriller
Stay Frosty	Sam Hargrave	Idris Elba	United States	Holiday action thriller
Sunflower	Misha Green	Jurnee Smollett, Isabel May, Scott Speedman	United States	Suspense thriller
The Accidental Gangster	George Gallo		United States	Biographical crime thriller
The Brigands of Rattlecreek	Park Chan-wook	Matthew McConaughey, Austin Butler, Pedro Pascal, Tang Wei	United States	Western thriller
The Dark Half	Alex Ross Perry		United States	Horror-thriller
The Ice Beneath Her	Matt Bettinelli-Olpin, Tyler Gillett	Daisy Ridley	United States	Psychological crime thriller
The Last Disturbance Of Madeline Hynde	Kenneth Branagh	Jodie Comer, Patricia Arquette, Michael Sheen, Tom Bateman, Vicky McClure, Michael Balogun, Kristina Tonteri-Young, Karla Crome, Aiysha Hart, Gemma Whelan	United Kingdom	Psychological thriller
The Last Mrs. Parrish	Robert Zemeckis	Jennifer Lopez, Nikolaj Coster-Waldau, Isabel May, Pierson Fodé, Debi Mazar, Denis O’Hare	United States	Crime thriller
The Offer	Vaughn Stein	Jordana Brewster, Scott Speedman, Laurence Fishburne, Addison Timlin	United States	Thriller
The Outlaws Scarlett and Browne	James Bobin	Phoebe Dynevor	United States	Crime thriller
The Ploughmen	Ed Harris	Bill Murray, Owen Teague, Nick Nolte, Amy Madigan, Lily Harris	United States	Crime thriller
The Saint	Doug Liman	Regé-Jean Page	United States	Action, crime thriller
The Seven Five	Ben Stiller		United States	Biographical crime thriller
The Wild	Patrick Brice		United States	Suspense thriller
The Art of Fighting	TBA	Tony Jaa Ji Chang-wook Iko Uwais Mark Dacascos Casper Van Dien Costas Mandylor,Tia Carrere Matthias Hues Olivier Gruner Celina Jade Jeeja Yanin Shioli Kutsuna Faith Delaney	United States	Action thriller
Thrill Ride	Ryuhei Kitamura		United States	Thriller
To Catch a Thief	TBA	Gal Gadot	United States	Romantic crime thriller
Under Another Name	Liz Hannah		United States	Psychological thriller
Unexpected Redemption	Remi Adeleke		United States	Action thriller
Unsound	Bharat Nalluri	Anna Kendrick	United States	Crime thriller
Untitled Universal Monsters comedy thriller	TBA	Channing Tatum	United States	Monster thriller, comedy
Uprising	Travis Knight		United States	Vampire action thriller
Van Helsing	Julius Avery		United States	Horror thriller
Versus	Jeremy Rush		United States	Action thriller
Young Sinner	Paul Verhoeven		TBA	Erotic thriller
