= List of horror films of 2020 =

This is a list of horror films that were released in 2020. This list includes films that are classified as horror as well as other subgenres. They are listed in alphabetical order.

== Highest-grossing horror films of 2020 ==
Highest-grossing horror films of 2020
| Rank | Title | Distributor | Worldwide gross | Ref |
|---|---|---|---|---|
| 1 | Demon Slayer: Kimetsu no Yaiba – The Movie: Mugen Train | Aniplex / Toho | $506.4 million | |
| 2 | A Quiet Place Part II | Paramount Pictures | $297.5 million | |
| 3 | The Invisible Man | Universal Pictures | $144.5 million | |
| 4 | The Grudge | Sony Pictures Releasing | $49.5 million | |
| 5 | The New Mutants | 20th Century Studios | $49.2 million | |
| 6 | Fantasy Island | Sony Pictures Releasing | $49 million | |
| 7 | Peninsula | Next Entertainment World | $42.7 million | |
| 8 | Underwater | 20th Century Fox | $40.9 million | |
| 9 | Gretel & Hansel | United Artists Releasing | $22.3 million | |
| 10 | Brahms: The Boy II | STX Entertainment | $20.3 million | |

== 2020 horror films ==
Horror films released in 2020
| Title | Director | Cast | Country | Genre | Ref |
|---|---|---|---|---|---|
| A Quiet Place Part II | John Krasinski | Emily Blunt, Cillian Murphy, Millicent Simmonds | United States | Post-apocalyptic Horror | |
| A Ghost Waits | Adam Stovall | MacLeod Andrews, Natalie Walker, Sydney Vollmer, Amanda Miller | United States | Horror, Romantic comedy | |
| Angels Fallen | Ali Zamani | Nicola Posener, Houston Rhines, Michael Teh, Li Jing, Michael Madsen, Said Legue, Caroline Amiguet, Eric Roberts | United States | Horror Science Fiction | |
| Alone | Johnny Martin | Tyler Posey, Summer Spiro, Robert Ri'chard, Donald Sutherland | United States | Apocalyptic Zombie Survival | |
| Alone | John Hyams | Jules Willcox, Marc Menchaca, Anthony Heald | United States | Thriller | |
| Antebellum | Gerard Bush, Christopher Renz | Janelle Monáe, Marque Richardson, Eric Lange | United States | Thriller | |
| Behind You | Andrew Mecham, Matthew Whedon | Addy Miller, Elizabeth Birkner, Jan Broberg | Ecuador | Horror | |
| Block Z | Mikhail Red | Julia Barretto, Joshua Garcia, Dimples Romana, Yves Flores, Maris Racal, McCoy de Leon, Ian Veneracion | Philippines | Apocalyptic Zombie Thriller | |
| Books of Blood | Brannon Braga | Britt Robertson, Anna Friel, Rafi Gavron, Yul Vazquez | United States | Anthology, Horror | |
| Butchers | Adrian Langley | Simon Phillips, Michael Swatton, Julie Mainville, Anne-Carolyne Binette, Samantha De Benedet, James Gerald Hicks | Canada | Slasher | |
| Brahms: The Boy II | William Brent Bell | Katie Holmes, Ralph Ineson, Owain Yeoman | United States | Supernatural Horror | |
| Caveat | Damian Mc Carthy | Johnny French, Leila Sykes, Ben Caplan, Conor Dwane | Ireland | Horror | |
| Children of the Corn | Kurt Wimmer | Elena Kampouris, Kate Moyer, Callan Mulvey | United States | Horror Slasher | |
| Corona Zombies | Charles Band | Robin Sydney, Cody Renee Cameron, Russell Coker | United States | Zombie Horror Comedy | |
| Death of Me | Darren Lynn Bousman | Maggie Q, Luke Hemsworth | United States | Horror | |
| Deep Blue Sea 3 | John Pogue | Tania Raymonde, Nathaniel Buzolic, Bren Foster | United States | Survival Horror | |
| The Empty Man | David Prior | James Badge Dale, Marin Ireland, Sasha Frolova, Robert Aramayo, Samantha Logan, Aaron Poole, Rob Canada, Joel Courtney | United States | Supernatural horror | |
| Fantasy Island | Jeff Wadlow | Michael Peña, Maggie Q, Lucy Hale | United States | Horror Fantasy Supernatural | |
| Freaky | Christopher Landon | Vince Vaughn, Kathryn Newton, Katie Finneran, Misha Osherovich, Celeste O'Connor, Alan Ruck | United States | Slasher, Comedy | |
| Friend of the World | Brian Patrick Butler | Nick Young, Alexandra Slade, Michael C. Burgess, Kathryn Schott, Neil Raymond Ricco | United States | independent Black and White | |
| Ghosts of War | Eric Bress | Brenton Thwaites, Theo Rossi, Skylar Astin, Kyle Gallner, Alan Ritchson, Billy Zane, Shaun Toub | United Kingdom, Bulgaria | Supernatural horror | |
| Gretel & Hansel | Oz Perkins | Sophia Lillis, Sam Leakey, Charles Babalola | Canada; United States; Ireland | Supernatural horror | |
| Hacksaw | Anthony Leone | Amy Cay, Brian Patrick Butler, Michael C. Burgess, Cortney Palm, Sadie Katz | United States | Found Footage Horror Slasher | |
| Her Name Was Christa | James L. Edwards | Shianne Daye, James L. Edwards, Drew Fortier | United States | Horror | |
| Host | Rob Savage | Haley Bishop, Jemma Moore, Emma Louise Webb | United Kingdom | Screenlife Supernatural horror | |
| Initiation | John Berardo | Isabella Gomez, Jon Huertas, Lindsay LaVanchy | United States | Slasher | |
| Kindred | Joe Marcantonio | Tamara Lawrance, Jack Lowden, Fiona Shaw | United Kingdom | Horror, Mystery, Drama | |
| Mang Kepweng: Ang Lihim ng Bandanang Itim | Topel Lee | Vhong Navarro | Philippines | Fantasy Horror Comedy | |
| Nocturne | Zu Quirke | Sydney Sweeney, Jacques Colimon, Madison Iseman | United States | Supernatural horror Drama | |
| Peninsula | Yeon Sang-ho | Gang Dong-won, Lee Jung-hyun, Lee Re | South Korea | Apocalyptic Action Zombie | |
| Possessor | Brandon Cronenberg | Andrea Riseborough, Christopher Abbott, Rossif Sutherland, Tuppence Middleton, Sean Bean, Jennifer Jason Leigh | Canada, United Kingdom | Science fiction Psychological horror | |
| Relic | Natalie Erika James | Emily Mortimer, Robyn Nevin, Bella Heathcote | United States | Psychological horror | |
| Rent-A-Pal | Jon Stevenson | Wil Wheaton, Brian Landis Folkins, Kathleen Brady, Amy Rutledge, Adrian Egolf | United States | Psychological Thriller | |
| Run Sweetheart Run | Shana Feste | Ella Balinska, Pilou Asbæk, Clark Gregg, Aml Ameen, Dayo Okeniyi, Betsy Brandt, Shohreh Aghdashloo | United States | Horror-thriller | |
| She Dies Tomorrow | Amy Seimetz | Kate Lyn Sheil, Jane Adams, Kentucker Audley | United States | Psychological Thriller | |
| Shortcut | Alessio Liguori | Jack Kane, Zanda Emlano, Zak Sutcliffe, Sophie Jane Oliver, Molly Dew | Italy | Horror | |
| Spree | Eugene Kotlyarenko | Joe Keery, Sasheer Zamata, Mischa Barton, John DeLuca | United States | Satirical Horror | |
| Sputnik | Egor Abramenko | Oksana Akinshina, Anton Vasiliev, Pyotr Fyodorov, Fyodor Bondarchuk | Russia | Science Fiction Horror | |
| Stay Out of the Attic | Jerren Lauder | Ryan Francis, Morgan Alexandria, Bryce Fernelius | United States | Horror | |
| Sweet Taste of Souls | Terry Ross | Honey Lauren, Sarah J. Bartholomew, Amber Gaston, Mark Valeriano, Thom Michael Mulligan | United States | Fantasy Horror | |
| The Babysitter: Killer Queen | McG | Judah Lewis, Hana Mae Lee, Robbie Amell | United States | Black comedy Slasher | |
| The Banishing | Christopher Smith | Jessica Brown Findlay, John Heffernan, John Lynch, Sean Harris | United Kingdom | Gothic, Horror | |
| The Dark and the Wicked | Bryan Bertino | Marin Ireland, Michael Abbott Jr., Xander Berkeley | United States | Supernatural horror | |
| The Grudge | Nicolas Pesce | Andrea Riseborough, Demián Bichir, John Cho | United States | Psychological Supernatural horror | |
| The Hunt | Craig Zobel | Ike Barinholtz, Betty Gilpin, Amy Madigan | United States | Action Horror Thriller | |
| The Invisible Man | Leigh Whannell | Elisabeth Moss, Aldis Hodge, Storm Reid | United States; Australia | Science fiction Horror | |
| The New Mutants | Josh Boone | Maisie Williams, Anya Taylor-Joy, Charlie Heaton | United States | Superhero Horror | |
| The Owners | Julius Berg | Maisie Williams, Sylvester McCoy, Jake Curran, Ian Kenny, Andrew Ellis, Rita Tushingham | United States, United Kingdom, France | Horror Thriller | |
| The Reckoning | Neil Marshall | Charlotte Kirk, Sean Pertwee, Steven Waddington | United Kingdom | Adventure Horror | |
| The Rental | Dave Franco | Dan Stevens, Alison Brie, Sheila Vand | United States | Horror | |
| The Superdeep | Arseny Syuhin | Milena Radulovic, Vadim Demchog, Maksim Radugin, Nikita Dyuvbanov, Kirill Kovbas | Russia | Horror | |
| The Turning | Floria Sigismondi | Mackenzie Davis, Finn Wolfhard, Brooklynn Prince | United States | Gothic Supernatural horror | |
| They're Outside | Sam Casserly, Airell Anthony Hayles | Emily Booth, Brad Moore, Nicholas Vince, Jon-Paul Gates, Emma Burdon-Sutton | United Kingdom | Horror | |
| Uncle Peckerhead | Matthew John Lawrence | David Littleton, Chet Siegel, Jeff Riddle, Ruby McCollister, Shannon O'Neill | United States | Comedy Horror | |
| Underwater | William Eubank | Kristen Stewart, Vincent Cassel, Jessica Henwick | United States | Science fiction Action Horror | |
| You Should Have Left | David Koepp | Kevin Bacon, Amanda Seyfried, Avery Essex | United States | Psychological horror | |
