= Assumption (film) =

- Poster
- Directed by: Anthony Leone
- Written by: Anthony Leone
- Produced by: Luke Pensabene
- Starring: Cortney Palm; Brian Patrick Butler; Kylie Young
- Cinematography: Luke Pensabene
- Edited by: Brian Patrick Butler
- Music by: R. Kim Shultz
- Production companies: Gray Area Multimedia; Leone Films
- Release date: February 16, 2017 (San Diego Film Week)
- Running time: 45 minutes
- Country: United States
- Language: English

Assumption is a 2017 science fiction horror short film written and directed by Anthony Leone. It stars Cortney Palm, Brian Patrick Butler and Kylie Young.

== Premise ==
The film follows a man trapped and isolated in a cargo elevator.

== Cast ==
- Cortney Palm
- Brian Patrick Butler
- Kylie Young

== Production ==
The film is Leone's first short film and was made in San Diego, California.

== Release ==
The film screened at Horrible Imaginings Film Festival in 2017.

== Reception ==
Emilie Black at Cinema Crazed complimented the acting, visuals, character development, and use of purgatory, but said it was slow, uneven, and too long. Catherine Dunn at The Independent Horror Society said it's a "chilling, horrific and brilliantly executed Groundhog Day" but listed continuity issues and questioned the use of nudity in film.
