= The Phantom Hour =

2016 American film by Brian Patrick Butler

- Official poster
- Directed by: Brian Patrick Butler
- Written by: Brian Patrick Butler
- Produced by: Brian Patrick Butler; Luke Pensabene
- Starring: Luke Pensabene; Raye Richards; Connor Sullivan; Morgan K. Reynolds; Dakota Ringer; Brian Patrick Butler
- Cinematography: Casey Richardson
- Edited by: Brian Patrick Butler
- Music by: Kevin MacLeod
- Production company: Rosewood Five
- Release date: September 8, 2016 (Horrible Imaginings Film Festival)
- Running time: 8 minutes
- Country: United States
- Language: English

The Phantom Hour is a 2016 comedy horror short film written and directed by Brian Patrick Butler. The film stars Luke Pensabene, Raye Richards and Connor Sullivan and premiered September 8, 2016 at Horrible Imaginings Film Festival.

== Plot ==
In a mysterious location, a vampire and his chef have a surprise for their dinner guests.

== Cast ==
- Luke Pensabene as Nikolai
- Raye Richards as Anna
- Connor Sullivan as Jeff
- Morgan K. Reynolds as Denise
- Dakota Ringer as Bernardo
- Brian Patrick Butler as Bryce

== Production ==
Butler said the film was influenced by Mel Brooks and German expressionist silent films.

== Release ==
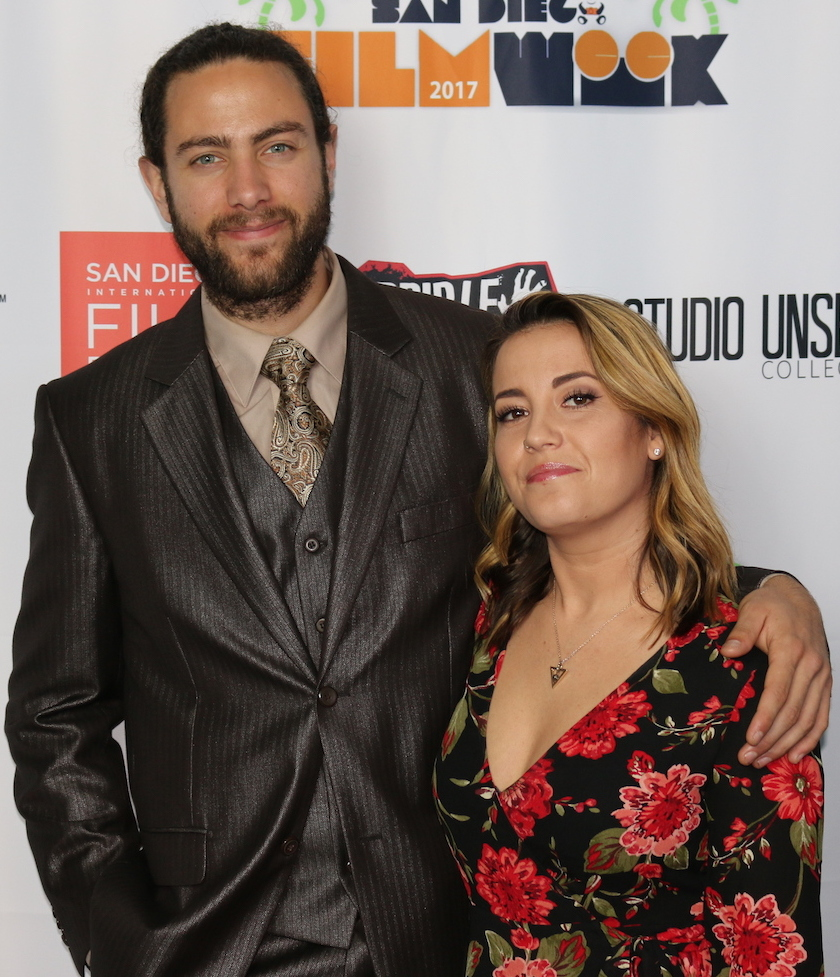
Luke Pensabene and Raye Richards at Lafayette Hotel for San Diego Film Week 2017

The Phantom Hour held a screening at Horrible Imaginings Film Festival on September 8, 2016. On February 17, 2017 it was shown at San Diego Film Week. The film went on to The International Horror Hotel in Cleveland on June 17, 2017.

== Reception ==
Brian Shaer at Film Threat scored it 7 out of 10, calling it a "chuckle-worthy diversion" and a "painless and fun experiment". Both Melee Stormbringer of Horror News and Ben Ragunton of Two Gay Geeks found it funny, comparing the film to Murder by Death and Clue. Emilie Black of Cinema Crazed said "it’s campy, it’s funny, it’s a bit ridiculous" and compared Butler's character to Renfield. Robert Mitchell Evans stated that it has a "lovely retro feel complete with a classic 30’s style of credits and paid homage to classic tropes".
