= What Daphne Saw =

- Poster
- Directed by: Lizz Marshall
- Written by: Lizz Marshall
- Produced by: Marine Delorme; Lizz Marshall; Cory Russell; Alex Winkler
- Starring: Sélynne Silver; George Griffith; Lia Barnett; Matthew Rhodes; Michael Estridge
- Cinematography: Sevag Chahinian
- Edited by: Lizz Marshall
- Music by: Alex Winkler
- Distributed by: Alter
- Release date: 2019
- Running time: 19 minutes
- Country: United States
- Language: English
- Budget: $7,864

What Daphne Saw is a 2019 American science fiction short film written and directed by Lizz Marshall. The film stars Sélynne Silver, George Griffith, Lia Barnett, Matthew Rhodes, and Michael Estridge. It won Best Actor and Best Score at Horrible Imaginings Film Festival in 2019.

== Plot ==
In a home with deep secrets, a woman is punished by serving others in the dystopian future.

== Cast ==
- Sélynne Silver as Daphne
- George Griffith as Paul
- Lia Barnett as Cara
- Matthew Rhodes as Steve
- Michael Estridge as Delivery Technician

== Production ==
The film stars Sélynne Silver. Not In Our City produced the film for $7,864 through Seed&Spark.

== Release ==
The film premiered at Horrible Imaginings Film Festival in 2019. It later screened at the FilmQuest Film Festival in Utah, Ax Wound Film Festival in Brattleboro, Vermont and Alamo Drafthouse Cinema in Katy, Texas at a fundraising event to combat human trafficking.

== Reception ==
=== Critical response ===
Nathaniel Muir at AIPT Comics said the subject matter of the film is tough, but praised the performances, atmosphere and direction. Morbidly Beautiful scored the film 5 out of 5. Terry Mesnard at Gayly Dreadful said the film is a "powerful watch" that was well-shot and performed. Anthony Digioia at Silver Screen Analysis said it "lays the groundwork for a full-feature film that would be gripping without question."

=== Accolades ===
Festival	Year	Award	Recipient(s)	Result	Ref.
FilmQuest Film Festival	2019	Best Sci-Fi Short	What Daphne Saw	Nominated	
Horrible Imaginings Film Festival	2019	Best Actor in a Short Film	George Griffith	Won	
Horrible Imaginings Film Festival	2019	Best Actress in a Short Film	Sélynne Silver	Nominated	
Horrible Imaginings Film Festival	2019	Best Director of a Short Film	Lizz Marshall	Nominated	
Horrible Imaginings Film Festival	2019	Best Dramatic Short Film	What Daphne Saw	Nominated	
Horrible Imaginings Film Festival	2019	Best Score in a Short Film	Alex Winkler	Won	
Horrible Imaginings Film Festival	2019	Best Screenplay of a Short Film	Lizz Marshall	Nominated	
