= City of Love (film) =

2023 film

- Poster
- Directed by: Èric Boadella
- Written by: Èric Boadella; Sara Pattarini
- Story by: Robert DeCesare
- Produced by: Byron Austen Ashley; Èric Boadella; Sara Pattarini
- Starring: Robert DeCesare; Kathryn Schott; Taylor Nichols; Mario Tardón; Myron Donley; Daniel Reed; Heidi Méndez; Samuel Garnett; Paul Dinh-McCrillis
- Cinematography: Romas Usakovas
- Edited by: Nadine Mundo
- Music by: Okan Isik
- Production company: Rotten Apple Entertainment
- Distributed by: Freestyle Digital Media
- Release dates: January 28, 2023 (New Jersey International Film Festival); December 19, 2023 (VOD)
- Country: United States
- Language: English

City of Love is a 2023 American comedy crime thriller film directed by Èric Boadella and written by Boadella and Sara Pattarini. The film stars Robert DeCesare, Kathryn Schott, Taylor Nichols and Mario Tardón.

== Plot ==
After 20 years in prison, a former inmate becomes a rideshare driver to catch up on his life in Los Angeles.

== Cast ==
- Robert DeCesare as Spencer Combs
- Kathryn Schott as Molly Sullivan
- Taylor Nichols as Ted Larsson
- Mario Tardón as Thomas
- Myron Donley as Henry
- Daniel Reed Ferrell as Young Spencer
- Heidi Méndez as Aunt Lidia
- Samuel Garnett as Will Patterson
- Paul Dinh-McCrillis as Jeff Harding
- Kristen Vaganos as Stephanie
- Nick Bardin as Sergej Zudarovich
- Joel Riley Martin as Sal Murphy
- Eric Riggs as Young Jeff Harding
- Chrissy Bergeron as Lourdes Combs
- Yessi Sanchez as Babel
- Michael Cortez as Inspector Ramirez
- Kelvin Adekunle as Nick
- Isabella Cohen as Anne
- Olivia Cohen as Mary
- Bunny Gibson as Jackie
- Tryphena Wade as Officer Flynn
- Vasilisa Badeka as Daughter

== Production ==
Car scenes in the film were shot in a studio and exteriors were composited together. Boadella said it was only possible to do during the pandemic because the empty studios were generous enough to give them a one-day rate for the entire film.

== Release ==
The film premiered at New Jersey International Film Festival on January 28, 2023, screened at DC Independent Film Festival, NewFilmmakers Los Angeles and was released on video on demand on December 19, 2023, by Freestyle Digital Media.

== Reception ==
The film won Best Feature Film at New Jersey International Film Festival's Spring 2023 edition. Natalie Tango at New Jersey Stage compared the film to Taxi Driver and said it is a phenomenal psychological horror film, complimenting DeCesare's performance and claiming the color "tones of blue and red help indicate the film’s negative, depressing theme."
