= Nick Young (actor) =

American actor

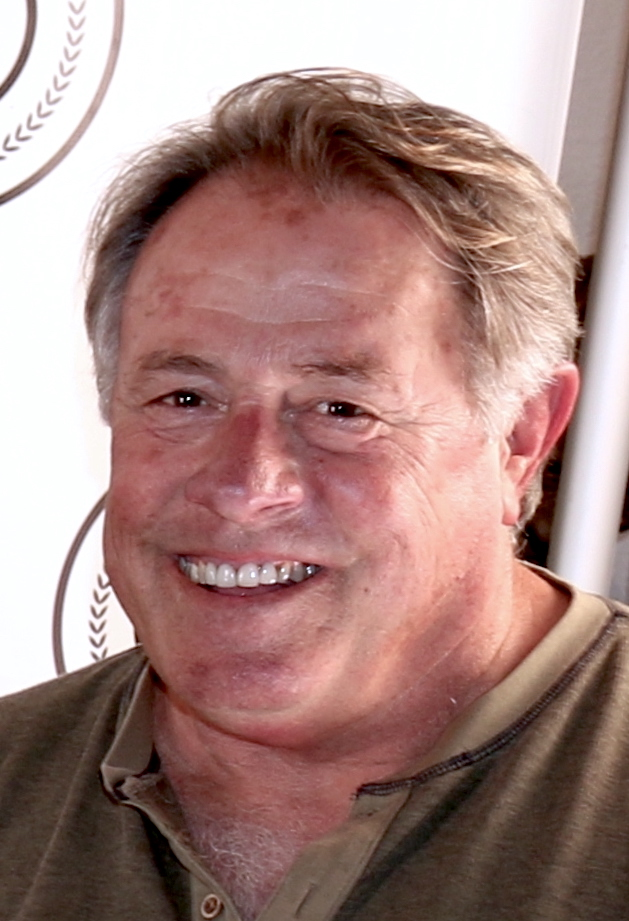
- Young in 2024
- Born: Nickolas Ray Young
- Other names: Nickolas R. Young; Nickolas Young
- Education: Palo Verde High Magnet School; Pima Community College
- Occupations: Actor; firefighter
- Years active: 1985–present
- Known for: General Gore in Friend of the World
- Notable credits: The Diary of Anne Frank; Hemet, or the Landlady Don't Drink Tea; The Other Place; Touch

Nickolas Ray Young is an American actor who appeared in the films Friend of the World (2020) and Hemet, or the Landlady Don't Drink Tea (2023), television movies El Diablo (1990) and Geronimo (1993), and OnStage Playhouse's productions of The Diary of Anne Frank (2011) and The Other Place (2022). Young began working on television in Arizona throughout the late 1980s and early 1990s before moving to San Diego County for film and theater work in the 2010s.

== Early life ==
Young was born to Elois Roain Drayfahl and Duain Francis Young. He became interested in performing arts while in grade school, was on the track team and played American football as an offensive lineman at Palo Verde High Magnet School. After high school, Young majored in drama at Pima Community College. While there, he qualified for the National Junior College Athletic Association championships after winning the Arizona Community College Athletic Conference for the discus throw but he was unable to place.

== Career ==
=== 1980–2008: Acting and firefighting career ===
Young acted in many television movies and shows in Tucson and Phoenix while pursuing a career as a firefighter. He was appointed to the Tucson Fire Department on June 16, 1980. In 1981, Young received an electric shock while working with another fireman who suffered steam burns. Both were treated for non-serious injuries. Young was promoted to engineer on May 8, 1988, and retired on February 28, 2008.

=== 2011–2023: Return to acting ===
After retiring as a fireman, Young relocated to San Diego County where he performed in stage plays such as The Diary of Anne Frank, The Other Place and Kimberly Akimbo. He was cast in films such as Hemet, or the Landlady Don't Drink Tea, The Case of: Dakota Moore, I Brake for Caterpillars as well as a Filmapalooza qualifying 48-hour short film called Con Boys.

=== 2020: Friend of the World ===
Young auditioned for Friend of the World by submitting a mobile video and he was cast as Gore, a lead role. Several film critics admired his performance and he was nominated for Best Actor at the San Diego Film Awards. The film was distributed by Troma Entertainment.

Ally Ham at Video Librarian said Young's chemistry with co-star Alexandra Slade was engaging but also out of place at times. Rob Rector at Film Threat and John Noonan at FilmInk noticed his character seemed to be inspired from Dr. Strangelove. Film critic Daniel M. Kimmel said Young proficiently expresses his character's thoughts and Cheryl Eddy at Gizmodo claims he has an "unhinged aura of someone who's been alone too long." Young's performance has been compared to John Goodman, Bruce Campbell and Sterling Hayden while director Brian Patrick Butler said his character is like John Wayne, casting him for his "grimness and humor."

== Stage credits ==
Year	Title	Role	Location	Notes
2011	Pride and Prejudice	Mr. Wickham	OnStage Playhouse, Chula Vista, California	
2011	The Diary of Anne Frank	Mr. Dussell	OnStage Playhouse, Chula Vista, California	
2012	The Sugar Witch	Grandaddy Meeks	OnStage Playhouse, Chula Vista, California	
2013	The Sugar Bean Sisters	The Bishop Crumley	PowPAC, Poway's Community Theatre, Poway, California	
2013	Kimberly Akimbo	Buddy	Point Loma Playhouse, San Diego, California	
2014	A Discourse on the Wonders of the Invisible World	Reverend Peck	Moxie Theatre, San Diego, California	
2015	Trouble in Mind	Bill O'Wray	Moxie Theatre, San Diego, California	
2015	Love Letters	Andrew Makepeace Ladd III	Point Loma Playhouse, San Diego, California	
2016	—N/a	—N/a	La Jolla Theatre Ensemble, La Jolla, California	
2019	Return Engagements	Joe Bristol	Scripps Ranch Theatre, San Diego, California	
2021	A People's Cuban Christmas Tale	Various	OnStage Playhouse, Chula Vista, California	Herbert Sigüenza adaptation of A Christmas Carol
2022	The Other Place	Ian Smithton	OnStage Playhouse, Chula Vista, California	
2022	Rest	Gerald	OnStage Playhouse, Chula Vista, California	by Samuel D. Hunter
2022	It's a Wonderful Vida	Saint Nick	OnStage Playhouse, Chula Vista, California	by Herbert Sigüenza

== Filmography ==
Film
Year	Title	Role	Notes
1992	The Vagrant	Guard	
2013	Speechless	Ethan	Short film
2016	Con Boys	Herman Hill	Short film
2020	Kirby	Alex	Short film
2020	Friend of the World	General Gore	
2021	The Case of: Dakota Moore	Detective Harris	
2022	Mike & Fred vs The Dead	—N/a	
2022	Touch	Detective Hooper	Short film
2023	Hemet, or the Landlady Don't Drink Tea	Tank	
2024	I Brake for Caterpillars	Police Chief	
TBA	A Corpse in Kensington †		
TBA	Fall of Giselle †		

Key
†	Denotes films that have not yet been released

Television
Year	Title	Role	Notes
1985	Gus Brown and Midnight Brewster	—N/a	TV movie
1988	The Legend of White Gold	Fred Talbot	TV movie
1988	The Highwayman	M.P. No. 1	Episode: "Summer of '45"
1988	Jesse	Sheriff	TV movie, uncredited
1988	One Life to Live	Investigator	1 episode
1988	Probe	Elder	Episode: "Untouched by Human Hands"
1989–1990	The Young Riders	James Crowley / Customer	2 episodes
1990	El Diablo	Deputy	TV movie
1992	Sunstroke	Cop	TV movie
1993	Geronimo	Purlington	TV movie
1993	Telling Secrets	Highway Patrolman	TV movie, uncredited
