= Horrible Imaginings Film Festival =

Film festival

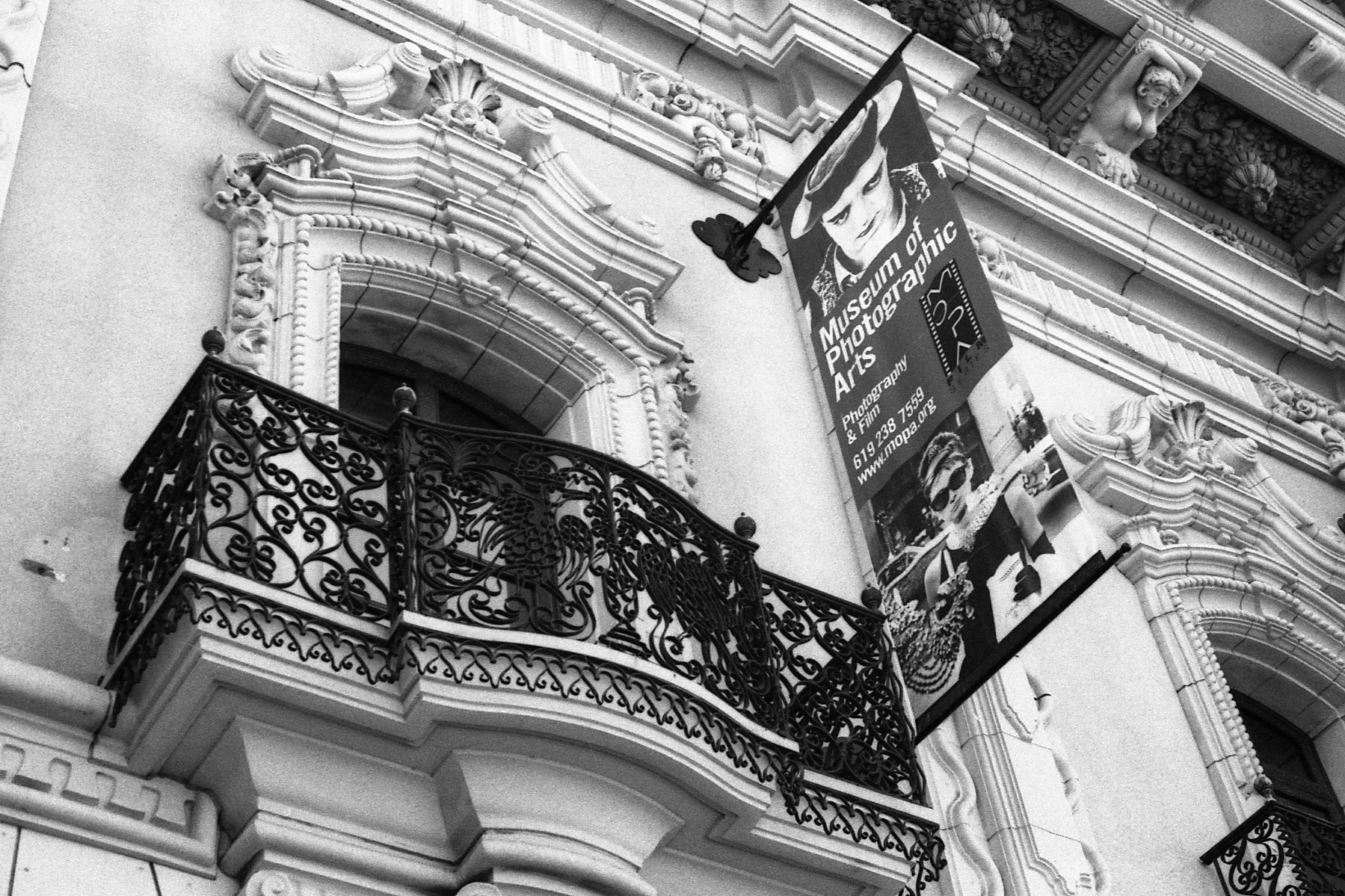
- 2015-2017 HIFF venue Museum of Photographic Arts
- Location: San Diego and Santa Ana, California
- Established: 2009
- Founded by: Miguel Rodriguez
- Most recent: 2021
- Festival date: Annually in September
- Language: English
- Website: hifilmfest.com

The Horrible Imaginings Film Festival (HIFF) was an annual film festival originally based in San Diego until 2018, when it moved to Santa Ana. It was established in 2009 by Miguel Rodriguez.

== History ==
Director Miguel Rodriguez is the curator for the festival founded in 2009. In 2015, the festival was held at the Museum of Photographic Arts in San Diego. In a 2015 interview with MovieMaker, Rodriguez spoke about making "the films the most important part of the festival". In 2018, the festival relocated to the Frida Cinema in Santa Ana, California. MovieMaker listed the festival on their 30 Bloody Best Genre Fests in the World in 2019. The festival received over seven hundred submissions for its tenth anniversary. It was held annually for three consecutive days in September before running seven days virtually due to the COVID-19 pandemic in 2020. In 2021, the festival returned with a "hybrid model" allowing for in-person and virtual options to audiences.

=== Notable films ===
In 2014, The Case of Evil premiered.

Brentwood Strangler was nominated Best Actress for Jordan Ladd in 2016. The Phantom Hour by Brian Butler screened the same year.

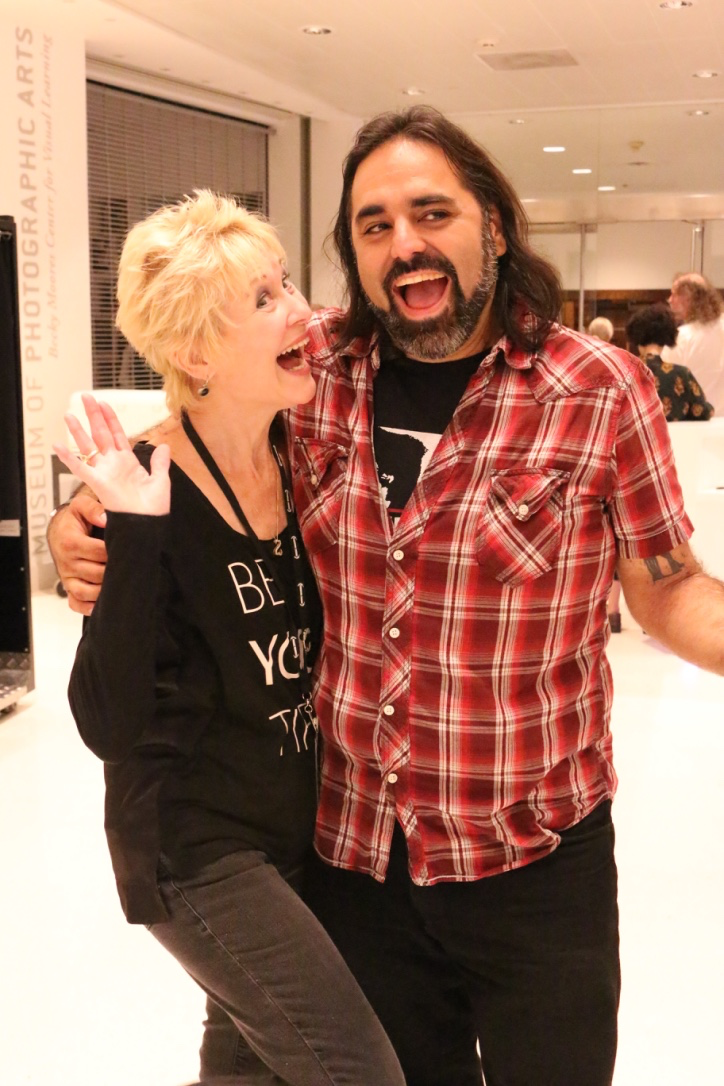
Rodriguez and Dee Wallace at the 2017 event

Red Christmas by Craig Anderson, Blood and Black Lace by Mario Bava, and Happy Hunting by Joe Dietsch and Louie Gibson screened in 2017. That same year, Hush won Best San Diego Film and Midnighters won Best Actress for Alex Essoe, Best Feature for Julius Ramsay and Best Screenplay for Alston Ramsay.

Snowflake won Best Film and Best Director for Adolfo J. Kolmerer in 2018.

Reborn, Antrum, Porno and What Daphne Saw won awards in 2019.

In 2020, Luz: The Flower of Evil won multiple awards.

We're All Going to the World's Fair by Jane Schoenbrun screened in 2021.

=== Notable appearances ===
Notable attendees include Barbara Magnolfi and Dee Wallace.
