= Luke Pensabene =

American actor and producer (born 1991)

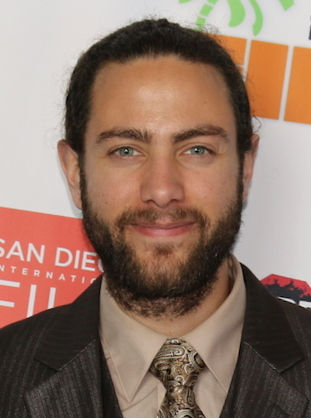
- Pensabene in 2017
- Born: Luke Anthony Pensabene; 1991 (age 34–35); New York, U.S.
- Education: PS 8 Shirlee Solomon School; St. Joseph by the Sea High School
- Occupations: Film actor; film producer; cinematographer
- Years active: 2013–present
- Notable work: Friend of the World; Hacksaw; South of 8
- Awards: The Vigil Honor 2010

Luke Anthony Pensabene is an American film actor, film producer, cinematographer, and United States Marine Corps veteran. He appeared in the films Fletcher and Jenks (2016), The Phantom Hour (2016), and produced the films South of 8 (2016), Friend of the World (2020), and Hacksaw (2020). Pensabene is a recipient of The Vigil Honor and was nominated for acting at the GI Film Festival San Diego in 2017.

== Early life ==
Pensabene was born in 1991 at Staten Island University Hospital. He grew up in Great Kills, Staten Island, attending PS 8 Shirlee Solomon School and started yoga at the age of 10.

In 2002, Pensabene was a trombonist in Staten Island's Boroughwide Band for the annual "Salute to Music" concert at Carnegie Hall. While attending St. Joseph by the Sea High School, he competed in track in 2005 for the 2.5 mile run at the 79th CHSAA Intersectional Cross Country Championship at Van Cortlandt Park and the distance medley for the Martin Luther King Jr. relays at Fort Washington Avenue Armory in 2006. In 2008, Pensabene was one of ten boy scouts at Camp Aquehonga to earn over 50 merit badges. He had previously achieved Scout, First Class and Star rankings before he was awarded The Vigil Honor in 2010.

== Career ==
Pensabene is a veteran of the United States Marine Corps. In 2021, he produced Graduation Afternoon, a Stephen King adaptation by author Marie D. Jones that was directed by Rob Padilla Jr..

=== Gray Area Multimedia ===
Pensabene, along with Jeanette Di Pinza and Tony Olmos, formed a production company called Rosewood Five Studios that was located at 1150 Seventh Ave in the basement of the C Street Inn. After the production of films like South of 8, The Phantom Hour, and a production of the San Diego International Fringe Festival in 2017, the venue became Gray Area Multimedia, which was solely managed by Pensabene.

Under the Gray Area banner, the location housed the film productions of Friend of the World by Brian Patrick Butler, Hacksaw by Anthony Leone, Touch by Justin Burquist, and Everybody Dies by the End by Ian Tripp and Ryan Schafer.

=== Mike & Fred vs. The Dead ===
In 2023, Pensabene was a co-producer for the stoner comedy film Mike & Fred vs. The Dead by film director Anthony Leone and executive producer James Cullen Bressack. The film is about two stoners navigating through a lockdown of the undead. It starred Amy Cay, Brian Patrick Butler, George Jac, Felissa Rose and featured Sadie Katz, Michael C. Burgess, and Nick Young. It was produced by Brain Damage Films and Leone Films.

== Filmography ==
Feature films
Year	Title	Role	Producer	Notes
2016	South of 8	Benji	Yes	
2020	Friend of the World	Ferguson	Co-producer	
2020	Hacksaw	—N/a	Yes	also special effects
2021	The Case of: Dakota Moore	—N/a	Associate producer	
2022	Everybody Dies by the End	F.B.I. Agent	Associate producer	
2022	Last Chance	Goon	Yes	also production designer
2022	Mike & Fred vs The Dead	—N/a	Co-producer	
2024	Dark Chronicles	Mike	Associate producer	

Short films
Year	Title	Role	Producer	Notes
2015	Hatred	Figure	No	
2016	Dearest Victoria	Ethan	Yes	
2016	Fletcher and Jenks	Luke	No	also cinematographer
2016	The Phantom Hour	Nikolai	Associate producer	
2017	Assumption	—N/a	Yes	also cinematographer
2019	Baby	Tommy	Yes	
2019	Buy Roses for Me	Phillipe	No	
2020	The Girl on the Photo	—N/a	Associate producer	
2020	Kirby	—N/a	Associate producer	
2021	Graduation Afternoon	Party Guest	Yes	

== Accolades ==
Organization	Year	Award	Title	Result	Ref.
Order of the Arrow	2010	The Vigil Honor	—N/a	Won	
GI Film Festival San Diego	2017	Best Actor	Fletcher and Jenks	Nominated	
