= Michael C. Burgess (editor) =

British poet (born 1956)

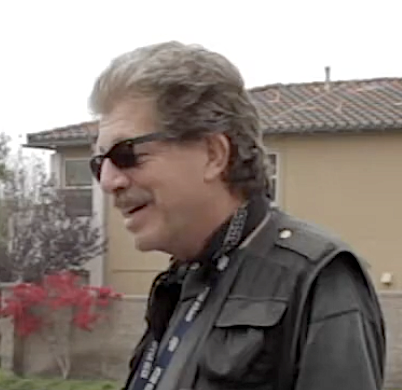
- Burgess in 2018
- Born: Michael Charles Burgess; 8 December 1956 (age 69); Bushey, Hertfordshire, U.K.
- Other names: Michael Burgess; Mike Burgess; Byronik; Baron Husk; Burgess & Lane
- Education: London College of Communication
- Occupations: Actor; editor; poet; activist; comedian
- Years active: 1978–present
- Employer: The Star-News
- Organization: OutRage!
- Known for: Journalism; Political activism
- Notable credits: Friend of the World; Hacksaw; South of 8
- Movement: Anti-Apartheid Movement; Campaign for Homosexual Equality
- Relatives: Lord Byron (ancestor)

Co-Treasurer of OutRage!
- In office May 1990 – 4 September 1990

Editor of The Star-News
- In office 29 March 2002 – 23 September 2004
- Website: byronik.com

Michael Charles Burgess (born 8 December 1956) is a British actor, poet, activist, comedian, and former editor of The Star-News who appeared in the films Friend of the World (2020), Hacksaw (2020), South of 8 (2016), and Twelve Views of Kensal House (1984). He helped assemble the Non-Stop Picket of South Africa House with the demand that Nelson Mandela be set free and is believed to be a descendant of Lord Byron.

== Personal life ==
Burgess was born to Geoffrey Burgess, an Oxford Times freelance writer and accountant at Lady Margaret Hall, Oxford. He and his father became the topic of an article for The Daily Telegraph after Christina Hardyment read Byron's Children by Susan Normington.

The Burgesses are presumed to be direct descendants of Lord Byron through Hannah Burgess, Byron's probable granddaughter and Geoffrey's great-great-grandmother. Hannah said she is the daughter of William Marshall, who claimed he was the illegitimate son of Byron.

== Career ==
=== Anti-Apartheid Movement ===
In the 1980s, Burgess was a City Group committee member, later reading The Leninist and aiding The Non-Stop Picket of South Africa House that called for Nelson Mandela's release from prison. He said the Picket became part of his daily routine and noticed early picketers lost their motivation and gave up.

Burgess and Steve Stannard were elected co-treasurers for OutRage! in May, 1990 when it became a not-for-profit organization. Stannard was ousted on September 4.

=== Film and theater performances ===
From 2004 to 2011, Burgess performed in plays in San Diego County such as Arcadia, The Engagement of Marjorie and Hay Fever. He acted in the films South of 8 (2016), Hacksaw (2020) and Friend of the World (2020).

=== Journalism ===
In 1988, Burgess interviewed several British black gay men and women in an article he wrote for The Voice. He became the editor of The Star-News in California, United States on March 29, 2002.

In 2003, Burgess wrote a column about Steve Padilla, quoting him from a Mid-Bayfront speech at San Diego Country Club. Padilla claimed Burgess made wrong interpretations about his statement. In 2004, Burgess gathered lawsuit information from City Council candidate Steve Castaneda who wanted legal action on his opponent, Dan Hom. After Burgess received hard copies of liens and court cases, his publisher told him to kill the story. The next day, Burgess was removed from his duties as Editor.

=== Poetry ===
Burgess is a Brixton bedsit poet and his verse, Blue Rhapsody, was published in Once I Was a Washing Machine by Ken Worpole in 1989. He talked about how difficult it is waiting for literature to be published for those that do not take up writing at a young age. Another verse, The Victims, was published in the 1990 book The Cream of the Troubadour Poets by David Stuart Ryan.

=== Publishing ===
In 2015, Burgess was editor and publisher for Damsels in Distress, Bailey Among The Angels and The Rican Eye Detective Agency by author Neil Raymond Ricco.

=== Stand-up comedy ===
In 1986, Burgess did stand-up comedy as Baron Husk at Shepherd's Bush Pavilion with Ian Macpherson and Kevin Day, and the Bearcat Club in Twickenham with Rory Bremner, Phil Cornwell, and Arnold Brown. On October 19, 1991, he did a show at the Hackney Empire with Tommy cockles, Hattie Hayridge, and Mark Steel. In 1994 and 1995, Burgess had a duo residency for Upstairs at the Redan in Queensway, London with John Lane, hosting for comedians like Shaun Pye as Burgess & Lane.

=== 2023–present ===
In 2023, Burgess posted on social media, "The very idea of human trials for Elon Musk's Neuralink chip is going to be a freak show that posterity will judge to be more horrific than the Holocaust."

== Filmography ==
Feature films
Year	Title	Role	Notes
1984	Twelve Views of Kensal House	Self	
2016	South of 8	Johannes Koppel	
2020	Hacksaw	—N/a	
2020	Friend of the World	Berenger	
2022	Mike & Fred vs The Dead	Grandpa Ben	
TBA	Fruitful Mold	Berenger	by Brian Patrick Butler
TBA	Penance	Detective Mason Brannigan	

Short films and music videos
Year	Title	Role	Notes
2011	Stones of Fire	Lance Altman	48 Hour Film Project
2013	News Travels Fast	Prof. Michael	48 Hour Film Project
2013	RAVEN: The American Dream	Reginald Grimes	
2014	Albatross	Boss cop	48 Hour Film Project
2014	GunzXGreen – "Jungle Music"	Evil white dude	Music video
2014	New Mexico – "Alpha Male"	Dad	Music video
2017	Insurance	Jameson	by Rob Padilla Jr.
2018	Last Vacation	Ron	

== Stage credits ==
Year	Title	Role	Location	Notes
1985	Two Stars for Comfort	Mr. Joyce	The Curtain Theatre, Aldgate	by John Mortimer, Lansbury Players
2004	Hay Fever	David Bliss	OnStage Playhouse	
2004	The Engagement of Marjorie	Carl Driskle	Lamplighters Community Theater, San Diego	
2005	Birthday Suite	Dick	OnStage Playhouse	by Robin Hawdon
2007	Arcadia	Captain Brice	Cygnet Theatre Company	
2011	The Cask of Amontillado	Montressor	Victory Theater, San Diego	Both part of DangerHouse Productions' Fear, Beautiful Fear
2011	Crime in the Madhouse	Dr. Caldwell	Victory Theater, San Diego	Both part of DangerHouse Productions' Fear, Beautiful Fear

== Accolades ==
Award	Year	Category	Title	Result	Notes
San Diego Press Club J-Awards	2002	Non-Daily Newspapers-Essay / Commentary / Opinion	Is that a banana in your pocket?	3rd place	
Aubrey Awards	2006	Actor / Major Support / Comedy	Birthday Suite	Nominated	

== Published works ==
- "Miriam Beadle" Jim Anderson, Black Tooth Press. 1987.
- "Blue Rhapsody" Ken Worpole, Once I was a Washing Machine. Federation of Worker Writers and Community Publishers. 1989. p. 14. ISBN 0-906411-02-5
- "The Victims" David Stuart Ryan, The Cream of the Troubadour Poets. Kozmik Press. June 30, 1990. ISBN 0-905116-194
