= Hacksaw (2020 film) =

2020 found footage horror film by Anthony Leone

- Poster
- Directed by: Anthony Leone
- Written by: Anthony Leone
- Produced by: Anthony Leone; Luke Pensabene
- Starring: Amy Cay; Brian Patrick Butler; Michael C. Burgess; Cortney Palm
- Cinematography: Anthony Leone
- Edited by: Anthony Leone
- Music by: R. Kim Shultz
- Production companies: Leone Films; Gray Area Multimedia
- Distributed by: Midnight Releasing
- Release dates: February 15, 2020 (Monsters of Horror Film Festival); January 5, 2021 (VOD)
- Running time: 70 minutes
- Country: United States
- Language: English

Hacksaw is a 2020 found footage horror slasher film written and directed by Anthony Leone in his feature film debut. The film stars Amy Cay, Brian Patrick Butler, Michael C. Burgess and Cortney Palm.

== Plot ==
A traveling young couple on a road trip venture into an abandoned building where a serial killer once tortured his victims.

== Cast ==
- Amy Cay as Ashley
- Brian Patrick Butler as Tommy
- Michael C. Burgess
- Cortney Palm as Teryn
- Kylie Young-Harper
- George Jac as Reporter Max Hart
- Sadie Katz as DJ Cassidy
- Jayce Venditti as Richard
- Christine Wawira

== Production ==
The feature film directorial debut for Leone, who was also cinematographer, editor, writer and producer. Leone gave thanks credit to Tobe Hooper and Dennis Hopper, noting influence of the film came from The Texas Chainsaw Massacre and Easy Rider. The film was shot in San Diego at Gray Area Multimedia with only practical effects and most of the time, a three person crew.

== Release ==
Hacksaw premiered on February 15, 2020, at Monsters of Horror International Film Festival. It was distributed on video on demand by Midnight Releasing on January 5, 2021.

== Reception ==
The film won Best Slasher Film at Monsters of Horror International Film Festival.

=== Critical response ===
Midnight Horror Show scored it 3 out of 5 claiming the runtime was too short, though the plot was interesting. Michael Therkelsen at Horror Society gave it a 6 out of 10, stating that the "special effects and scenes of torture" save the movie, adding "It’s a romp in an abandoned building filled with torture porn and sizable talent." AJ Friar at Infamous Horrors gave it 3 out of 5 stating that it is a unique film but the script could be tighter. Dante Yurei of 10th Circle scored it 4 out of 10, claiming it will get the "attention of gorehounds." David Garrett at Dark Discussions said most of the story was boring and needed more development scoring it 3.5 out of 10. Bloodbath and Beyond gave the film 1 out of 5. Jim Morazzini at Voices From The Balcony scored it a 1 out of 5 calling it a "torture porn" splatter film and that "feels like a bad attempt at a Rob Zombie film." Andrew Welsh scored it an F, claiming "you won’t find any low budget, indie horror movie charm here." FilmTv said it had disastrous direction which simulates the terrible mockumentary.
