= Friend of the World =

2020 American film by Brian Patrick Butler

- Official poster
- Directed by: Brian Patrick Butler
- Screenplay by: Brian Patrick Butler
- Produced by: Brian Patrick Butler; Luke Pensabene
- Starring: Nick Young; Alexandra Slade; Michael C. Burgess; Kathryn Schott
- Cinematography: Ray Gallardo
- Edited by: Brian Patrick Butler
- Music by: Stefan Krut
- Production companies: Charybdis Pictures; Gray Area Multimedia
- Distributed by: Troma Entertainment; Cineverse
- Release dates: August 15, 2020 (Oceanside International Film Festival); November 22, 2021 (VOD)
- Running time: 50 minutes
- Country: United States
- Language: English

Friend of the World is a 2020 American experimental comedy horror film written and directed by Brian Patrick Butler in his feature film debut, starring Nick Young and Alexandra Slade. The surreal experimental film takes place post-apocalypse and tells the story of a young filmmaker (Slade) and a military general (Young) trapped in a bunker with a mysterious threat.

Written as a dark comedy body horror film in 2016, the film was produced by Charybdis Pictures. Inspired by the threat of nuclear war and current political events, Butler also cited the works of Samuel Beckett, Jean-Paul Sartre, John Carpenter, and David Cronenberg as influences.

Filming took place at Gray Area Multimedia and other parts of San Diego County in May, 2017. It premiered August 15, 2020 at the Oceanside International Film Festival and was released on video on demand in 2021. The film was distributed by Cineverse and Troma Entertainment.

Film critics compared it to Night of the Living Dead, Dr. Strangelove, The Lighthouse, and 10 Cloverfield Lane. It has a 91% approval rating from 23 reviews on Rotten Tomatoes, ranking in their best horror and science fiction films of 2021 and their 100 Best Zombie Movies.

== Plot ==
Diane (Alexandra Slade) awakens in a bunker surrounded by dead bodies after a brutal massacre. After attempting to escape the structure, she eventually passes out at the bottom of an elevator shaft where she is rescued by a mysterious man who calls himself General Gore (Nick Young).

Though he plays mind games with her, Gore gives her food and water as he attempts to figure out who Diane is and how she got into the bunker. Still shaken, she has trouble piecing it together, but she can remember being taken there by force. She also tells him about the film she had been creating.

Gore hints at a contingency plan for escaping the bunker. Without a good alternative, Diane decides to follow him through the toxic environment in hopes of reaching safety. Along the way they are attacked by mutating creatures that were allegedly poisoned by radiation. A tension and psychological confrontation slowly develops between the two survivors as they get nearer to their destination and Diane feels her sanity start to slip.

== Cast ==
- Nick Young as Gore
- Alexandra Slade as Diane
- Michael C. Burgess as Berenger
- Kathryn Schott as Eva
- Kevin M. Smith as Thin Man
- Luke Pensabene as Ferguson
- Neil Raymond Ricco as Ignacio

== Production ==
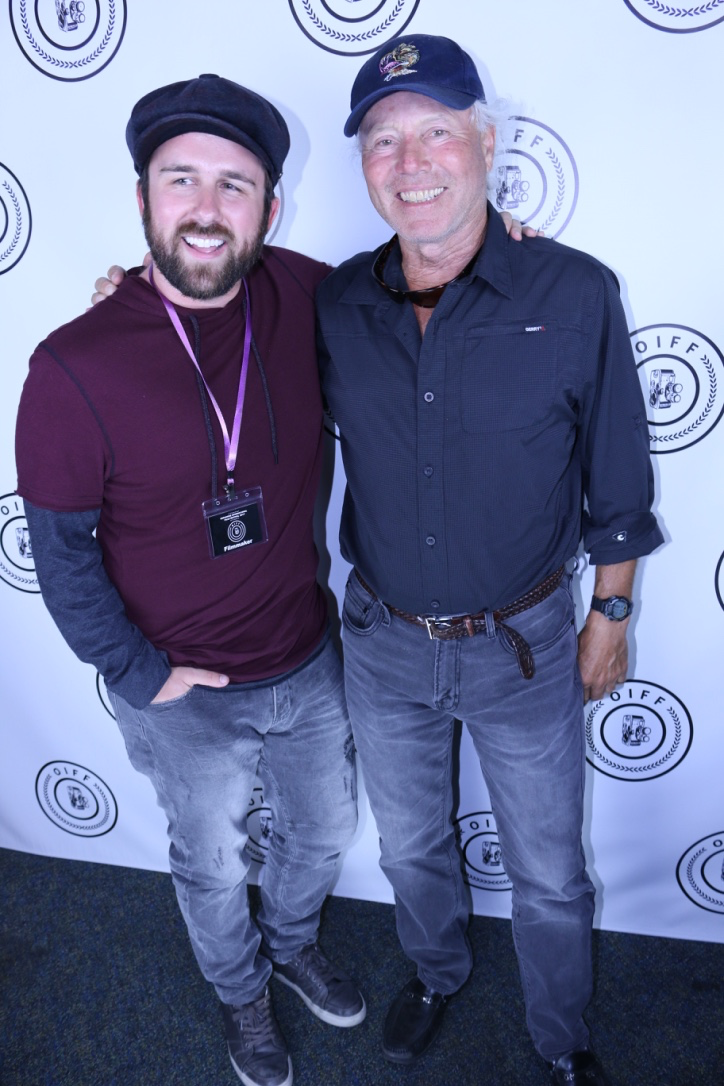
Brian Patrick Butler and Kerry Rossall at Oceanside International Film Festival 2017

=== 2016–2017: Development and pre-production ===
The script was formulated in 2016. Butler said the film is a "universal story about conceptions of good, evil, corruption and the twisted passing of the generational torch from a fractured, wisened psyche to a self-righteous, still-developing one." Inspiration came from issues at the time such as the threat of nuclear war and the 2016 United States presidential election.

Pre-production started around August 2016. For casting, Nick Young said he was stumbled upon while performing on stage and was cast as Gore after being asked to audition by mobile video. The character of Diane was originally written as a young man, but scheduling conflicts and delays led to rewrites and ultimately Alexandra Slade was cast in the role. Kerry Rossall contributed to the production as executive producer, funding the project directly.

=== 2017–2019: Principal photography and post-production ===
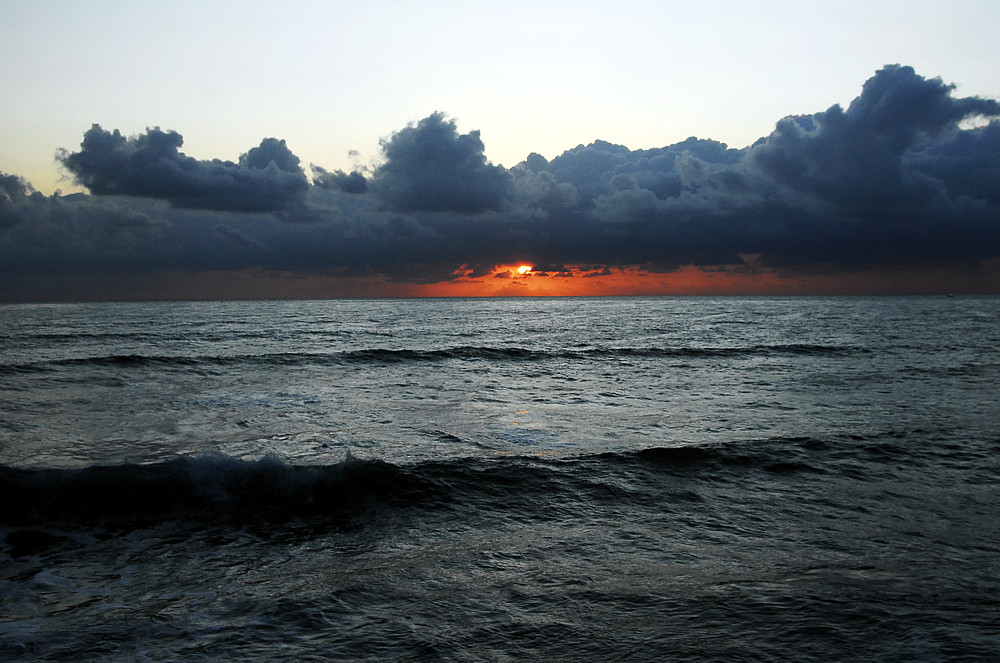
Sunset Cliffs resembled the beauty of the world before.

Principal photography began on May 13, 2017, in San Diego County and lasted for ten days. The majority of filming took place at Gray Area Multimedia, an underground studio which doubled as a bunker, a key location Butler had intended to use for the production. One of the exterior scenes was filmed at Sunset Cliffs, a location Butler chose to resemble the beauty of the world before chaos. Another location was the Tierrasanta entrance to Mission Trails Regional Park near Camp Elliott. The cinematography was handled by Ray Gallardo and the special make-up effects by C.J. Martinez. Butler had a rough cut of the film ready within months of wrapping but the final stages were not complete until 2019, after Daniel N. Butler edited the visual effects and sound. The production was Butler's directorial feature length debut and the first film of his longer than a 15 minute runtime. Upon completing the film, Butler said:

It is roughly an hour-long dark comedy sci-fi with a Twilight Zone feel and elements of body horror, absurd humor and satire.

=== Music ===
Soundtrack
No.	Title	Writer(s)	Performer	Length
1.	"Symphony No. 9 in D minor, Op. 125" (Ode to Joy)	Ludwig van Beethoven	Stefan Krut
2.	"Gassenhauer"	Hans Neusidler	Stefan Krut
3.	"Lobotomy Jig"	Stefan Krut	Stefan Krut
4.	"Who Goes There?"	Woyzeck	Woyzeck
5.	"Collective Elephantidae"	Woyzeck	Woyzeck

Corin Totin of Sick Flix mentioned the film has "a background score of an almost unrecognizably discordant version of Ode to Joy." Celia Payne of Let's Talk Terror said "a surprisingly gleeful string arrangement accompanies scenes where humans-turned-monstrosities melt into themselves, shape-shift, and eat rats, bringing the audience into their world of insanity."

== Themes ==
=== Style ===
Melissa Hannon at Horror Geek Life said "although it technically falls within the post-apocalyptic category, Friend of the World defies any specific genre." Mark Harris at Black Horror Movies mentioned it mixes horror and sci-fi with heady drama. Several critics pointed out that it is a body horror film. Others conclude that it is a strange avant-garde art film filled with subtext. Lisa Marie Bowman at Through the Shattered Lens said it comes with "a hint of Kubrickian satire" with scenes reminiscent of Alien, concluding that surviving the end of the world does not mean you'll have a choice on who remains with you.

Joseph Perry at Horror Fuel mentioned it's like The Twilight Zone if Rod Serling and Charles Beaumont ate psychedelic material, or if ideas from Dr. Strangelove, Night of the Living Dead and Apocalypse Now were merged. Albert Valentin of World Film Geek claims it is a zombie apocalypse film in the realm of "Romero meets Muschietti meets Cronenberg." Redmond Bacon at Tilt Magazine said it blends the zombie film genre with the existential film drama, acknowledging Butler, as if he had a "Raging Bull-like" David Lynch version of 10 Cloverfield Lane. Sean Parker of Horror Obsessive mentioned it has similarities to The Divine Comedy, with political satire and doomsday conspiracies. Paul Klein at Filmhounds Magazine said the "weird mix of horror and comedy" felt like a "companion piece" to The Lighthouse.

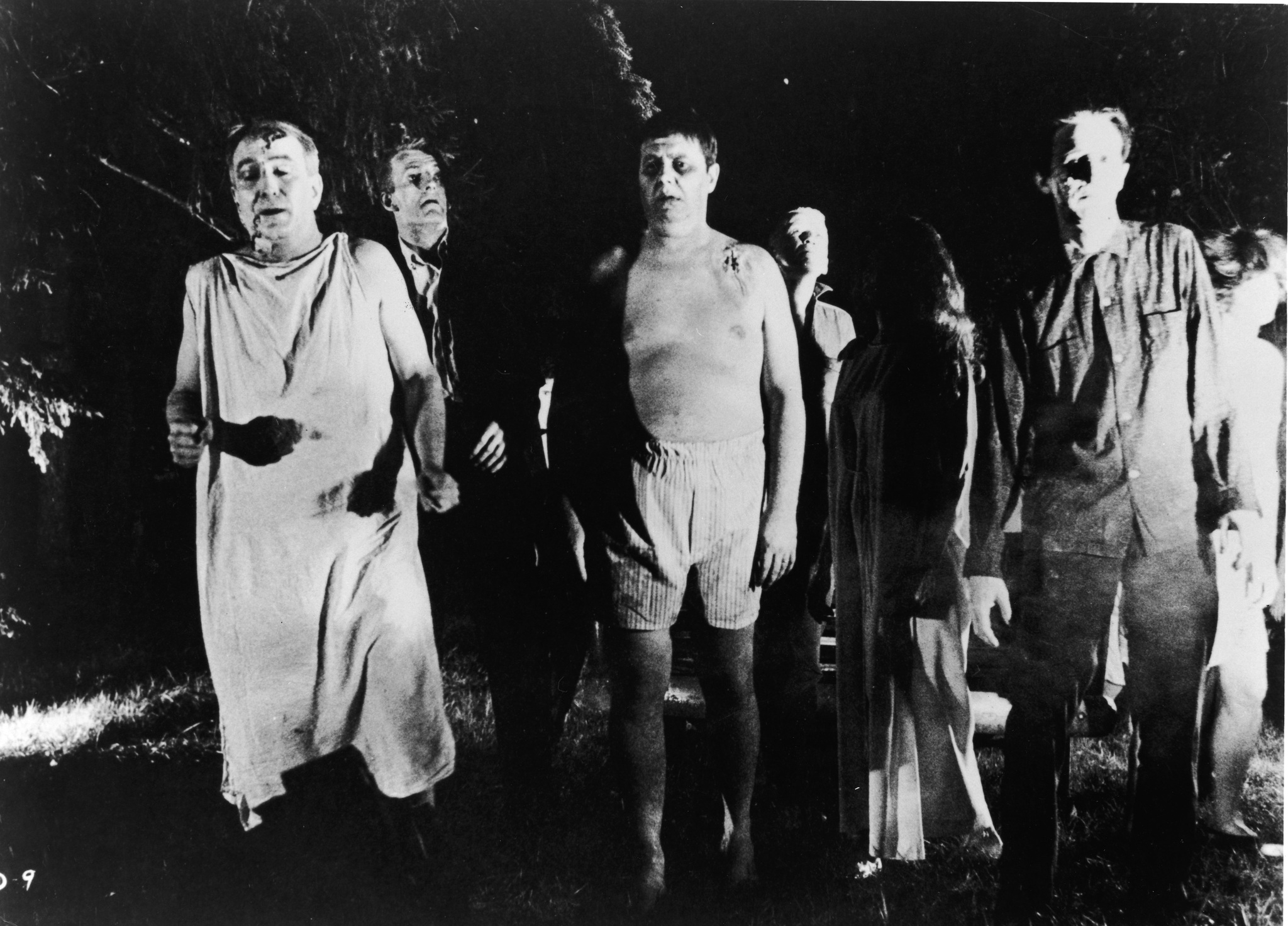
Themes and style drew comparisons to the 1968 zombie film Night of the Living Dead.

Butler chose to have the film mostly in black-and-white to accentuate the perspective of Gore's world. Alain Elliott at Nerdly said shooting in black and white helped its style and low-budget film constraints. Milana Vujkov at Lola on Film claims it has "a terrifyingly delightful string of corruptive catalysts, explosive apparitions of post-humanity, taken straight out of Burroughs" and that the "unsustainability of the human condition in a genetically modified apocalypse is a mix of home movie and Brechtian theatre play." Dennis Schwartz Movie Reviews said that the fifty minute film is split up into chapters which allows for viewers to ponder at the nonlinear narrative.

Jeremie Sabourin at Cinema Smack mentions that some filmmakers will extend a narrative out to ninety minutes even if they don't have enough story to tell. "With Friend of the World though, it sometimes feels like there's ninety minutes of content compacted into its fifty minute runtime." Celia Payne at Let's Talk Terror appreciated its shorter runtime, stating that "it shows the filmmakers know when their story is done and don't try to extend when not necessary." Butler claims he structured the film to be around fifty minutes, like an episode of Twilight Zone or Black Mirror. Butler said:

In this day and age I think it would fit nicely within a streaming service – whether self-contained, part of an anthology series, or expanded into multiple episodes of a larger story.

=== Connection to reality ===
It is interesting to see the qualities of the film that retain their original effect, and those that have acquired additional meaning after the immediate passing of such an eventful chapter in our history.

— Brian Patrick Butler in 2020 on Friend of the World

Karla Peterson at The San Diego Union Tribune said that Butler did not anticipate his feature-film debut to happen virtually during an actual pandemic, although "the surreal environment is a perfect match for an unsettling film where the source of chaos might just be a contagion." Being made available around a global conflict, during a pandemic and controversial election year, it was received by critics as a prophetic experience.

Some critics called it a COVID satire or socio-political horror thriller, drawing thematic comparisons to Butler's 2023 screenplay Hemet, or the Landlady Don't Drink Tea and speculating that the latter film could be a prequel.

When we look back on the quarantine days it will be films like this and Host that will stand as an artistic representation of the anxieties of the time.

— Corin Totin, "Short Film Review: Friend of the World (2020) Duration 50 min 30 sec", Sick Flix (8/12/2020)

=== Character analysis ===
Jeremie Sabourin at Cinema Smack claims "Friend of the World also feels like a natural continuation of our current world due to its characters." Rebecca Cherry at Film Carnage said it makes a good attempt to identify "a more character driven apocalyptic story pulling elements from a modern America." Jim Morazzini of Voices From The Balcony claimed the characters as being "archetypes at opposite ends of American society" and compared the uncertain reality of the film to "An Occurrence at Owl Creek Bridge like flight of a mind approaching death." Brian Robertson of The Vista Press said "its characters echo a disturbing truth that is currently plaguing our nation today." Conor McShane at Morbidly Beautiful said it's a film that brings up the ideological and racial divides in America.

==== Protagonist ====
Diane (Alexandra Slade) is a young millennial filmmaker. She is a grounded, level-headed individual with liberal views. Joel Fisher of Battle Royale With Cheese points out that Diane being a filmmaker is Butler allowing the audience to "smile a little at the director mocking himself."

==== Antagonist ====
General Gore (Nick Young) is an old, heavily built military officer who seems increasingly unhinged. S Dewhirst of Set The Tape said he is "wild-eyed and larger than life, a big man with a big voice, big gut and big ideals." Critics have compared him to Sterling Hayden's Jack D. Ripper of Dr. Strangelove, Powers Boothe's Senator Ethan Roark of Sin City, Jack Nicholson's Jack Torrance of The Shining, and his voice to Anthony Hopkins and Gerald Mohr.

=== Influence ===
Friend of the World influence
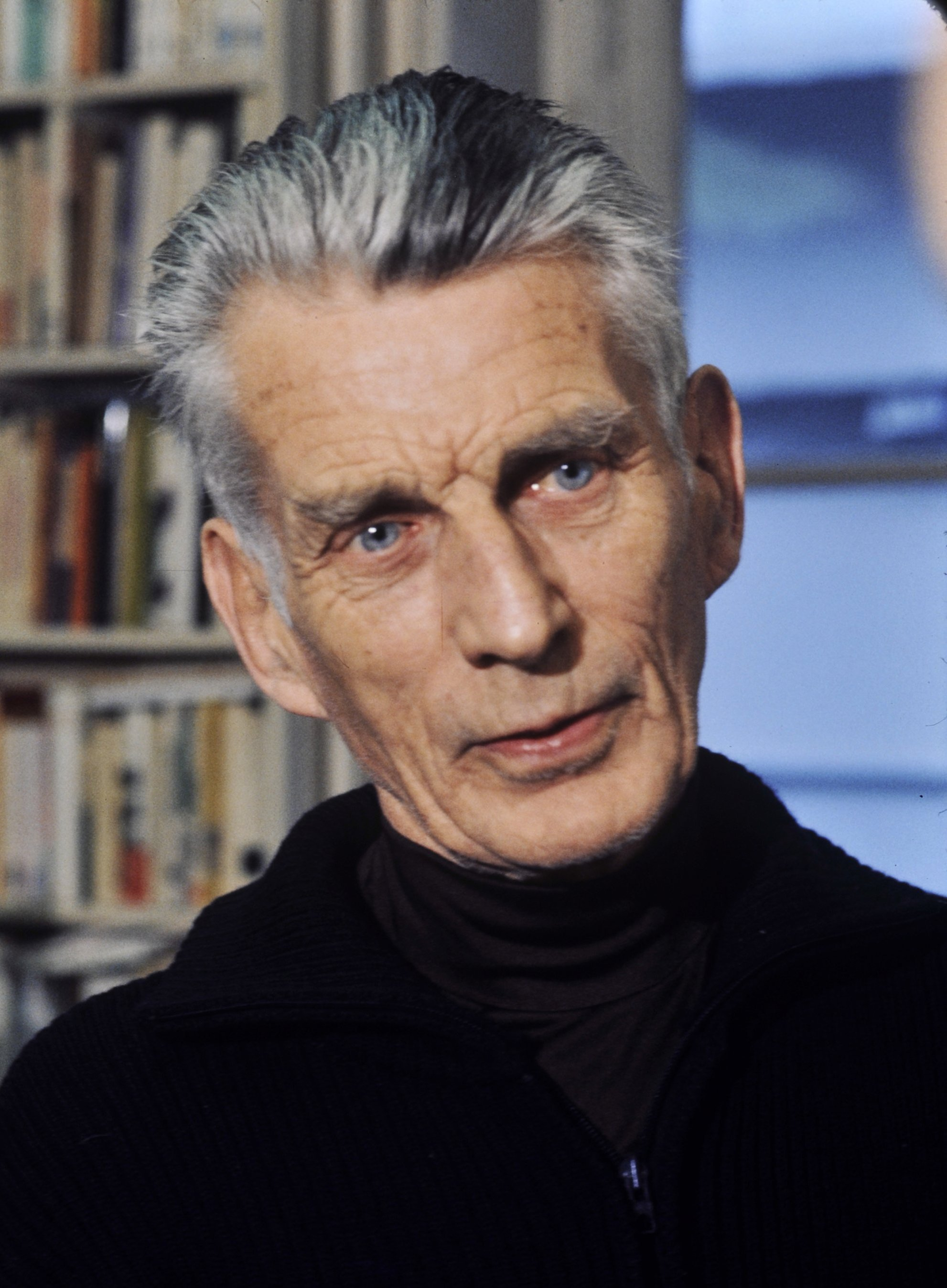
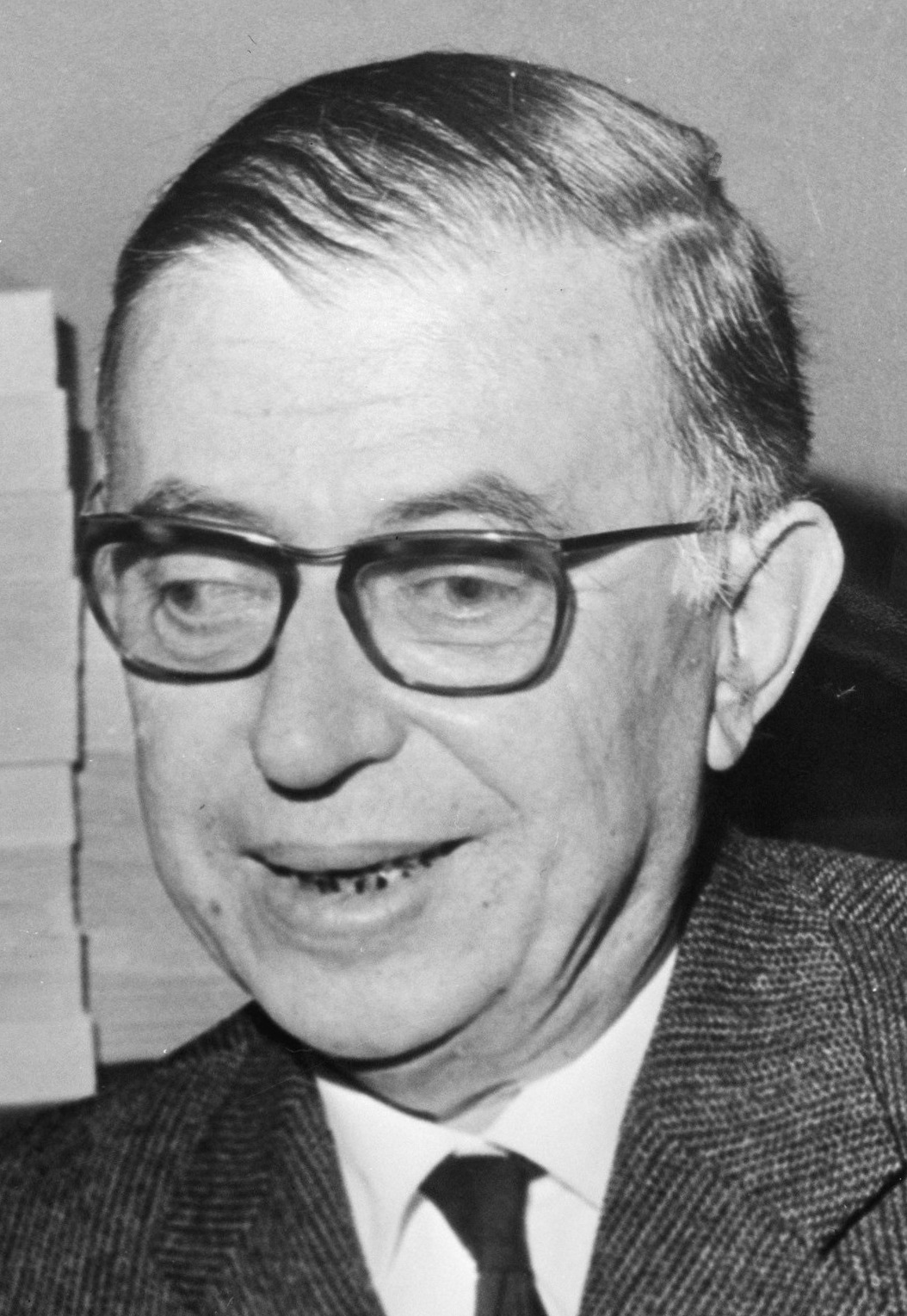
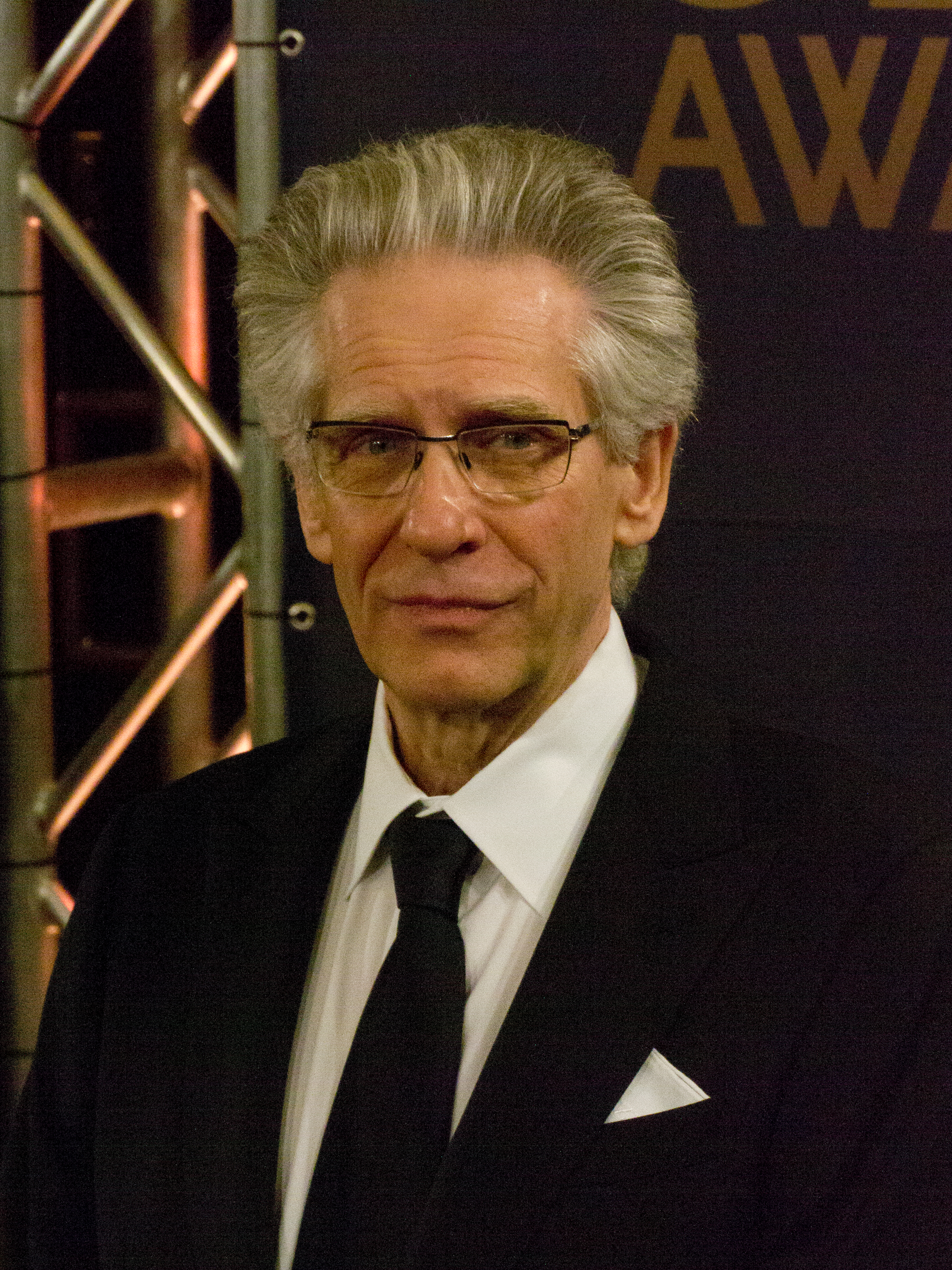
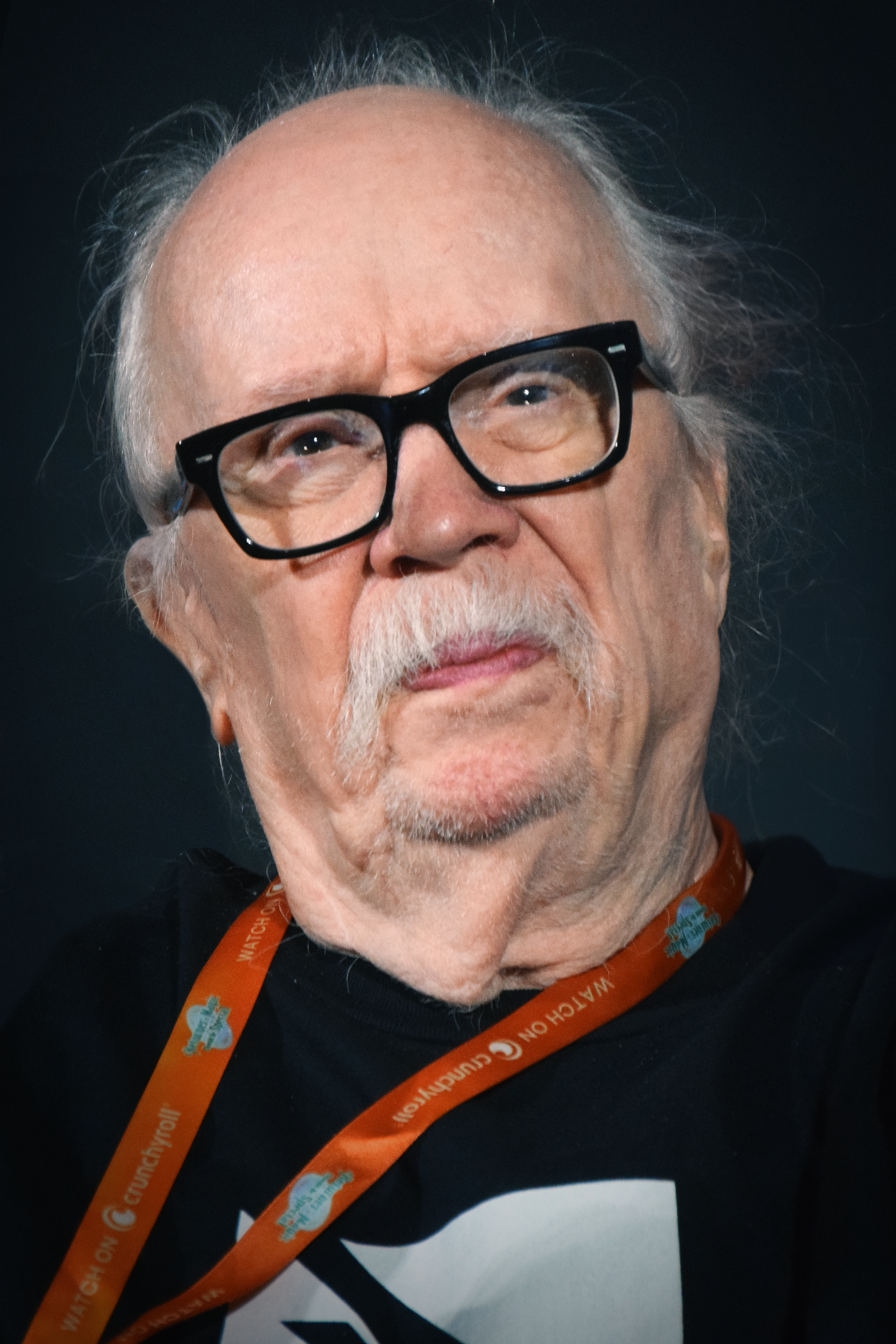
- Top: Samuel Beckett and Jean-Paul Sartre
- Bottom: David Cronenberg and John Carpenter

In an interview with Times of San Diego, Butler stated that Friend of the World's style was inspired by the works of Samuel Beckett, Jean-Paul Sartre, John Carpenter and David Cronenberg. He mentioned that political anxieties and absurdist theatre helped inspire him to write. The film is said to draw inspiration from films and television such as The Twilight Zone, Dr. Strangelove, The Thing and La Jetée, as well as plays such as No Exit and Krapp's Last Tape. It is a two-hander film with "comic absurdity and social satire" that broadens the "body horror subgenre of science fiction and horror."

==== Bible verse ====
Therefore whoever wishes to be a friend of the world makes himself an enemy of God.

When asked if the film's title had any biblical influence, Butler confirmed it did not.

== Release ==
The film was to premiere in early 2020, but the COVID-19 pandemic delayed its release. Friend of the World held a seven day virtual world premiere at the Oceanside International Film Festival on August 15, 2020. In December 2020, a second virtual screening was held at Another Hole in the Head Film Festival. In 2021, it was released on Plex and Amazon Prime Video and screened at San Diego Film Week. In 2022, it released on Tubi and Xumo and was acquired by Troma Entertainment on their streaming app Troma Now. By 2023, the film was distributed by Cineverse and released to an international audience on Apple TV and iTunes.

== Reception ==
=== Critical response ===
Friend of the World received mostly positive reviews from critics. On the review aggregator website Rotten Tomatoes, 91% of 23 critics' reviews are positive, with an average rating of 6.0/10. On the aggregation website CherryPicks, the film received a 61% positive score by non-binary and women critics.

I'd like people to walk away from our film not with answers, but hopefully feeling a profound connection with the characters.

— Brian Patrick Butler when asked about suitable impressions of Friend of the World

Ally Ham at Video Librarian scored it 4.5 out of 5, stating that "Friend of the World is an evocative indie gem serving a little bit of science fiction, some dark comedy, and a healthy dose of body horror." John Noonan at FilmInk said "in some ways, Friend of the World is a black comedic theatre piece translated to celluloid." Rob Rector of Film Threat scored the film 6 out of 10 and said it "works more like a stage play than a film [...] but it does share a persistent dread and discomfort" comparing it to Possum by Matthew Holness.

Douglas Davidson at Elements of Madness said it "has something real to say regarding interpersonal strife powered by misinformation and the narrow view of only certain parts of humanity." Melissa Hannon at Horror Geek Life awarded the film 3.7 out of 5 stars, writing "Friend of the World is truly an acid trip of a movie." Jeremie Sabourin at Cinema Smack gave it 3.5 out of 5 and felt the tone matched Night of the Living Dead as if done by Terry Gilliam claiming that "its nightmarish and claustrophobic setting will have viewers on edge." Corin Totin of Sick Flix rated the film 4.5 out of 5, comparing it to Tetsuo: The Iron Man, declaring "this is a piece of art that is very much of this moment and really taps into the surreal horror that we are experiencing in the world at large right now."

This is how you take on a genre that has been done to death.

— Redmond Bacon, "Friend of the World is a Bracing Stocktake of a Crumbling World", Tilt Magazine (9/11/2020)

Film critic Daniel M. Kimmel of the Boston Online Film Critics Association said "It makes for a disturbing 50-minute running time that is engaging but will likely leave you wondering what it was all about." Cheryl Eddy at Io9 says "there are flickers of humor along the way, as well as a slight story twist that explains the film's title." Tim Brennan of About Boulder admitted arthouse films can be intimidating to watch, but called it a "strange little art film made with intelligence and wit." Anton Bitel at Projected Figures said the film "uses bunkered post-apocalyptic sci-fi/body horror to reconcile an imperfect, polarised world."

When it comes down to it, the film's twisted, mind-bending journey really leads viewers back to themselves, and to what they would do if they were in Diane's bloody shoes.

— Karla Peterson, The San Diego Union Tribune

Alain Elliott of Nerdly said the dialogue driven performances are good and that "when you think post-apocalyptic zombie movie, this movie and its script isn't what you expect." Mitchell Brown at Slay Away said it is a "strange film that is at its best when it focuses on the dialogue and performances of the two leads." Hugues Porquier from Battle Royale With Cheese called it "interesting writing" and "clean photography." They mentioned a possible reference to Leos Carax's Boy Meets Girl and said it reminded them of Videodrome and Existenz, swinging "between realism and surrealism." Nils Gollersrud at Loud And Clear Reviews said "the film succeeds best in crafting an eerie paranoia and unpredictability that keeps it watchable."

Mark H. Harris of Black Horror Movies said "the articulate script is dialogue-heavy with a philosophical bent" and it "presents some thoughtful takes on identity, individualism and reconciling divergent worldviews." S Dewhirst of Set The Tape said it has "themes of genetic engineering, world war, propaganda, paranoia and zombies" and that "fans of the off-beat, the weird, and the not-quite-mainstream will likely find plenty to enjoy in this strange, starkly-shot trip through the bunkers and cellars of a ruined world." Kristy Strouse at Wonderfully Weird & Horrifying said that even though the film "sometimes meanders, the captivating performances, gnarly practical effects, and intelligent direction make the most of its limited screen time."

Corey Bulloch of UK Film Review claims it has "world-building that leaves more confusion than intrigue" and "constant ambiguity that it's hard for the audience to maintain invested interest." Keri O'Shea at Warped Perspective said that it "needed to commit to something – oddness, aesthetics, or plot." Rebecca Cherry at Film Carnage gave it 2 out of 5 and said "There's the classic theme of survival as with any apocalypse film but the threat isn't sufficient enough to add the right amount of tension or suspense to keep you gripped or invested in the characters' fate." MontiLee Stormer at Movie Reelist scored it 2 out of 5 and said to "save this one as a palette cleanser between a Waters film and a Lynch film."

Lindsey Ungerman at Horror Buzz said it had "Tarantino vibes", was "attention-grabbing and engaging but loses steam quickly due to story ambiguity and spasmodic dialogue." They rated it 3 out of 10 concluding that the film was "definitely beautiful" but "too chaotic." Marie Asner of The Phantom Tollbooth scored it 1 out of 5 and came to the conclusion that it "would have made a better radio drama than a film." Josh Taylor at Nightmarish Conjurings said that "it's a clever film that never feels clever enough for its own premise."

Characters and storylines were buried under the rubble of the apocalypse this film finds itself in.

— Lindsey Ungerman, "Friend of the World was Attractive but Jumbled", Horror Buzz (9/14/2020)

=== Accolades ===
List of awards and nominations
Award	Year	Nominated work	Category	Result	Ref.
Video Librarian	2022	Friend of the World	Top 15 Best Narrative Films	Won	
San Diego Film Awards	2020	Friend of the World	Best Narrative Feature	Nominated	
San Diego Film Awards	2020	Nick Young	Best Actor	Nominated	

== Legacy ==
Ranked by Tomatometer, Friend of the World is one of Rotten Tomatoes' best horror and science fiction films of 2021 and is ranked on their list of 100 Best Zombie Movies.

Bored Panda included the film on their list of "50 Best Horror Comedies That Will Have You Confused Whether To Laugh Or Scream". Movieweb listed it on their "10 Best Recent Zombie Movies You Haven’t Seen Yet" and MW magazine published it on their "19 Highly Rated Zombie Movies You Can Stream In India Right Now".

It ranks #4 on Times of San Diego's 10 "off-the-wall movies filmed in San Diego" and is one of Video Librarian's "Top 15 Best Narrative Films of 2022".

== See also ==
- The Day After, a 1983 American television film depicting the repercussions of nuclear war.
- Five, a 1951 American science fiction horror film where 4 men and a woman attempt survival in the aftermath of the atomic bomb.
- Threads, a 1984 British television film that centers on the societal after-effects of nuclear war.
- Who Goes There?, a 1938 science fiction horror novella.
- Art horror
- List of films featuring fictional films
- List of films featuring hallucinogens
- Science fiction comedy
- Surreal cinema
- Survival film
