= Brian Patrick Butler =

American actor

- Born: San Diego, California, U.S.
- Education: San Diego State University; British American Drama Academy
- Occupations: Actor; filmmaker
- Years active: 2014–present
- Known for: Friend of the World; Hemet, or the Landlady Don't Drink Tea
- Notable credits: South of 8; Thane of East County; We All Die Alone
- Website: brianpbutler.com

Brian Patrick Butler is an American actor, film director, screenwriter, and film producer. He is known for writing and directing the film Friend of the World (2020), writing and performing in the film Hemet, or the Landlady Don't Drink Tea (2023), and appearing in the films South of 8 (2016), Thane of East County (2015) and We All Die Alone (2021).

== Life and career ==
While pursuing a degree in theatre arts at San Diego State University, Butler directed a production of Stephen Adly Guirgis's play The Last Days of Judas Iscariot. He also attended British American Drama Academy at Magdalen College, Oxford. After graduating, Butler performed at New Village Arts Theatre in the West Coast premieres of The House Theatre of Chicago's The Nutcracker and Sarah Ruhl's Stage Kiss. He was also cast in Return to the Forbidden Planet at New Village Arts and played KJ in Ion Theatre's production of Annie Baker's The Aliens. During this time, Butler acted in the feature films South of 8 and Thane of East County before writing and directing two short films: Hatred and The Phantom Hour. In 2017, Butler starred in the short film Assumption and later in Hacksaw, a feature-length slasher film with Sadie Katz and Cortney Palm.

=== Released films ===
In 2016, Butler formulated a script titled Friend of the World. In 2020, the film premiered virtually at the Oceanside International Film Festival during the COVID-19 pandemic. Following the premiere, Butler mentioned he was inspired by the works of John Carpenter and Samuel Beckett. The film was distributed by Troma Entertainment in 2022 and is listed as one of the 100 Best Zombie Movies, Ranked by Tomatometer.

In 2023, Butler starred as Liz Topham-Myrtle, a ruthless landlady, in a film made from his screenplay Hemet, or the Landlady Don't Drink Tea. Directed by Tony Olmos, it was distributed by BayView Entertainment in 2024. Butler was nominated for acting, writing and editing at the 13th Oceanside International Film Festival.

=== Upcoming film: A Corpse in Kensington ===
In 2024, Butler directed a film titled A Corpse in Kensington, based on his own screenplay. Produced by Butler and Justin Burquist, the film features Michael Madsen, Ryan Bollman, Derrick Acosta, Vinny Curran, and Kimberly Weinberger. The film entered post-production in late 2024. In 2026, Butler confirmed the film will be a psychological slasher romcom set on Halloween 2010 in Kensington, San Diego.

== Filmography ==
Year	Title	Writer	Director	Actor	Producer	Role	Notes
2015	Hatred	Yes	Yes	Yes	Executive	John	Short film
2016	The Phantom Hour	Yes	Yes	Yes	Yes	Bryce	Short film
2020	Friend of the World	Yes	Yes	No	Yes		
2023	Hemet, or the Landlady Don't Drink Tea	Yes	No	Yes	Executive	Liz Topham-Myrtle	
TBA	A Corpse in Kensington †	Yes	Yes	No	Yes	—N/a	

Key
†	Denotes films that have not yet been released

=== Acting roles in other films ===
Year	Title	Role	Ref.
2015	Thane of East County	Matt	
2016	South of 8	Ryan Bertrand	
2017	Assumption		
2019	Buy Roses for Me	Leo	
2020	Hacksaw	Tommy	
2020	Zach King's Day Off	Brian Butler	
2021	Graduation Afternoon	Ben Dorne	
2021	We All Die Alone	Riley	
2021	Continuance	Loren	
2022	Mike & Fred vs The Dead	Fred	
2022	3 Little Kungpoo Goats	One Leg / Hyena (voice)	
2023	The Godfather	The Crime Boss	

== Accolades ==
Event	Year	Award	Film	Result	Ref.
Horrible Imaginings Film Festival	2015	Best Dramatic Short Film	Hatred	Nominated	
Downtown Los Angeles Film Festival	2022	Best Ensemble Cast in a Short Film	We All Die Alone	Won	
Oceanside International Film Festival	2022	Best Supporting Actor	We All Die Alone	Nominated	
Oceanside International Film Festival	2024	Best Actor in a Lead Role	Hemet, or the Landlady Don't Drink Tea	Nominated	
Oceanside International Film Festival	2024	Best Editing in a Feature	Hemet, or the Landlady Don't Drink Tea	Nominated	
Oceanside International Film Festival	2024	Best Screenplay (Feature)	Hemet, or the Landlady Don't Drink Tea	Nominated	
Video Librarian	2022	Top 15 Best Narrative Films	Friend of the World	Won	
Atlanta ShortsFest	2022	Best Ensemble Cast	We All Die Alone	Nominated	
Georgia Shorts Film Festival	2022	Best Actor	We All Die Alone	Nominated	
Simply Indie Film Fest	2023	Best Ensemble Cast	We All Die Alone	Won	
San Diego Film Awards	2015	Best Supporting Actor	Birthday Wish	Nominated	
San Diego Film Awards	2020	Best Narrative Feature Film	Friend of the World	Nominated	
San Diego Film Awards	2022	Best Ensemble Cast	We All Die Alone	Won	
San Diego Film Awards	2024	Best Ensemble Cast in a Narrative Feature Film	Hemet, or the Landlady Don't Drink Tea	Nominated	
San Diego Film Awards	2024	Best Lead Actor in a Narrative Feature Film	Hemet, or the Landlady Don't Drink Tea	Nominated	
San Diego Film Awards	2024	Best Narrative Feature Film	Hemet, or the Landlady Don't Drink Tea	Nominated	
San Diego Film Awards	2024	Best Original Screenplay in a Narrative Feature Film	Hemet, or the Landlady Don't Drink Tea	Nominated	
San Diego Film Week	2023	Best Dark Comedy Feature Film	Hemet, or the Landlady Don't Drink Tea	Nominated	
