= Sayuri Oyamada =

Japanese actress

- 小山田サユリ
- Born: Maki, Nishikanbara, Niigata, Japan
- Occupation: Actress
- Years active: 1999–present
- Website: oyamadajapan.com

Sayuri Oyamada (小山田 サユリ, Oyamada Sayuri; born in Niigata Prefecture, Japan) is an actor and businesswoman. She began her career in Japan, starring in Body Drop Asphalt, accruing acclaim in Japan and globally.

Oyamada's work includes films produced in Japan and internationally, including leads in Bright Future (2003), Seventh Anniversary (2003), Miracle Banana (2005) (Haiti), Suki Da (2006), Watashi Dasuwa (2009), Insect Detective Yoshimi Yoshida (2010). In 2016, she played the leading role of Aya in While the Women Are Sleeping (女が眠る時) directed by Wayne Wang and also starring Takeshi Kitano, Hidetoshi Nishijima, and Shiori Kutsuna premiered at the 66th Annual Berlin International Film Festival.

Oyamada's recent work includes leads in Bashira (2021) directed by Academy Award winner Nickson Fong, a short directed by Govind Rae, and a supporting role in the Japanese feature, Lady in White directed by Yuki Otsuka. The latter two were due for release in 2019. She is currently based in New York City and runs an onigiri business.

== Life and film career ==
Sayuri Oyamada was born in Niigata, Japan. While in junior college, she was scouted to appear in TV commercials. Oyamada made her acting debut in 2000, acting for director Junko Wada in Body Drop Asphalt. Funded by Aichi Arts Centre for non-mainstream work and guest-starring Takuji Suzuki, it debuted at the International Film Festival Rotterdam in 2001. It then accrued acclaim in Japan and globally. In 2010, Oyamada ventured to New York to expand her international career having been selected by the Japanese Ministry of Culture to represent the Japanese entertainment community in an elite cultural exchange program. She has spent her time between Tokyo, Los Angeles, and New York and is currently based in New York and Tokyo.

Oyamada's professional work includes critically acclaimed films produced in Japan and internationally, including leads in Bright Future (2003), Seventh Anniversary (2003), Miracle Banana (2005) (Haiti), Suki Da (2006), Watashi Dasuwa (2009), Insect Detective Yoshimi Yoshida (2010). In 2016, Oyamada played the leading role of Aya in While the Women Are Sleeping (Onna ga Nemurutoki 女が眠る時) directed by Wayne Wang. An adaptation of Javier Marias’s semi-erotic Spanish short story, it also stars Takeshi Kitano, Hidetoshi Nishijima, and Shiori Kutsuna. Financed by Dentsu and Toei Company, it premiered at the 66th Annual Berlin International Film Festival.

Oyamada's next trilogy of theatrical projects includes leading roles in Bashira directed by Academy Award winner Nickson Fong, due out November 2020, a short directed by Govind Rae, and a supporting role in the Japanese feature, Lady in White directed by Yuki Otsuka. The latter two were due for release in 2019.

Oyamada's Japan-based commercial work includes Bridgestones "Good Winter" television campaign and work for brands such as Docomo, Sony, Lion and others. She has been featured in commercials in the United States for such brands as Cadillac, Shiseido feat. Lady Gaga, Apple Watch, IBM ThinkPad, Audible (Amazon), and Keurig. She also runs an onigiri restaurant in Manhattan.

== Onigiri business ==
The pandemic hit independent and low-budget film industries in New York hard. While bigger budgets could film in other locations, those with lower budgets could not afford to shoot for safety reasons as they were unable to secure locations or have working schedules. Oyamada had a friend who worked in the grocery store daily for whom she made onigiri, and they loved it. With ongoing demand, she started her own company in the fall of 2020, experimenting with flavors and teaching staff.

== Filmography ==
Year	Title	Director	Notes
2000	Body Drop Asphalt	Junko Wada	
2000	Tokyo Trash Baby	Ryuichi Hiroki	
2001	Oboreru Sakana	Yukihiko Tsutumi	
2002	Her Island, My Island	Itsumichi Isomura	
2003	Love on Sunday; Koi suru nichiyobi (恋する日曜日) (TV series, 2003-2007)	Manabu Aso, Tomoyuki Furumaya	
2003	Bright Future	Kiyoshi Kurosawa	Official Selection, Cannes International Film Festival (2002);
2003	Friends (Furenzu)”	Naoki Hashimoto	
2003	Eau de vie	Tetsuo Shinohara	
2003	Seventh Anniversary	Ikao Yukisada	
2004	Ki no umi	Tomoyuki Takimoto	
2005	Double Suicide Elegy	Toru Kamei	Berlin Asia-Pacific Film Festival Best Feature Film Award; Cinema Paradise Film Festival Best Feature Film Award; Atlanta Underground Film Festival Best Picture Award
2005	Sayonara Midori-chan	Tomoyuki Furumaya	
2005	Fururi	Masayuki Koide	
2005	Su-ki-da	Hiroshi Ishikawa	Official Selection, New Montreal FilmFest; Silver Iris Award
2005	Miracle Banana	Yoshinara Nishikori	Shot on location in Haiti
2007	Tokyo no uso	Haruo Inoue	
2008	Bloody Monday	TV series	
2009	It's on Me (Watashi Dasuwa)	Yoshimitsu Morita	
2010	Toku no Sora	Haruo Inoue	
2010	Yoshimi Yoshida the Insect Detective	Sakichi Sato	
2012	Kaidan Shin Mimibukuro – Igyo	Noboru Iguchi	
2012	Key of Life	Kenji Uchida	
2012	Soup Curry (TV)	Yoshikatsu Kimura	
2013	Cult ("Karuto")	Koji Shiraishi	
2016	While the Women Are Sleeping	Wayne Wang	Berlin International Film Festival
2018	Lady in White	Yūki Ōtsuka	
2019	Bashira	Nickson Fong	

== Theatre ==
Year	Title	Director	Notes
200X	Honeybee	Keishi Nagatsuka	
200X	“Forever Waltz”	Hiroshi Shirai	
