= Say Hello to My Little Friend (Awake) =

- Awake episode
- Episode no.: Season 1 Episode 11
- Directed by: Laura Innes
- Written by: Kyle Killen; Leonard Chang
- Production code: 1ATR10
- Original air date: May 10, 2012
- Running time: 44 minutes

Guest appearances
- Laura Innes as Tricia Harper; Daniela Bobadilla as Emma; Kevin Weisman as Ed Hawkins; Carlos Lacamara as Joaquin; Evan Helmuth as Roland Petrowski; Wayne Bastrup as Thompson; Sharon Omi as Sarah Paul; Casey Kramer as Cindy; Marcus Choi as Harvey; Josh Novak as Tom

Episode chronology
← Previous "Slack Water"	Next → "Two Birds"

"Say Hello to My Little Friend" is the eleventh episode of the American television police procedural fantasy drama Awake, which originally aired on NBC on May 10, 2012. Written by Leonard Chang and series creator Kyle Killen, "Say Hello to My Little Friend" earned a Nielsen rating of 0.9, being watched by 2.51 million viewers upon its initial broadcast in the United States. Directed by recurring guest actress Laura Innes, the episode generally received positive reviews, with many critics claiming that it was the best episode of the series since "Pilot" and that Jason Isaacs' performance deserved an Emmy Award.

Awake centers on Michael Britten (Isaacs), a detective living in two separate realities after a car crash. In one reality, in which he wears a red wristband, his wife Hannah Britten (Laura Allen) survived the collision, and in another reality, in which he wears a green wristband, his son Rex Britten (Dylan Minnette) survived. In this episode, Michael passes out during a bungee jump while he is at a carnival with Rex and Emma (Daniela Bobadilla). He is unable to switch realities, consistently hallucinates and realizes that Ed Hawkins (Kevin Weisman), a detective who is working with Michael's former partner Bird (Steve Harris), was attempting to kill him in the crash. Meanwhile, Hannah deals with Emma's new baby by trying to convince her parents to let her keep the baby.

Shortly after this episode was broadcast, NBC announced their decision to cancel Awake, due to declining ratings, although NBC still decided to air the remaining two episodes in the show's original time slot. Isaacs found "Say Hello to My Little Friend" the most difficult to shoot, and had to imagine an awful thing happening to his family. It was filmed in Los Angeles, California, and continued and introduced key thematic elements to the series.

== Plot ==
=== Background ===
The Brittens are involved in a fatal car crash. As a result, Michael Britten, a Los Angeles Police Department (LAPD) detective, begins to live in two separate realities. In one reality, in which he wears a red wristband, his wife Hannah Britten (Laura Allen) survives the crash, and in the other reality, in which he wears a green wristband, his son Rex Britten (Dylan Minnette) survives. Michael does not know which reality is real, and uses the wristbands to differentiate the two.

Michael sees two separate therapists: Dr. Jonathan Lee (BD Wong) in the "red reality", and Dr. Judith Evans (Cherry Jones) in the "green reality". Meanwhile, in the "red reality", Michael and Hannah continue with their plan to move to Oregon. Michael works with Detective Isaiah "Bird" Freeman (Steve Harris) in the "green reality" and with Detective Efrem Vega (Wilmer Valderrama) in the "red reality" after the collision.

=== Events ===
Dr. Lee asks Michael about his latest experience with "green reality". At a police carnival at an amusement park, Emma (Daniela Bobadilla), Rex's girlfriend, asks if she and Rex can bungee jump. As they are walking to the ride, Michael bumps into someone who claims that it was his fault. At the ride, Michael goes first, but the person in charge of the ride seems concerned about something; Michael passes out and wakes up in the "red reality" (where Hannah is alive, but Rex is dead), as if the "green reality" were a dream. In the "red reality", Dr. Lee says it is progress, that Michael is trying to tell himself that his son is dead and that he is on the verge of a breakthrough. Shortly after getting into his car, Michael suddenly sees the man who he bumped into at the amusement park. Michael sees the mystery man several more times throughout the episode, and it becomes more clear the man is only a hallucination.

Michael passes out and remembers events shortly before and after the crash; Hannah and Rex are singing the Queen song, "Bohemian Rhapsody". Later, Michael meets with Emma's father, Joaquin (Carlos Lacamara) at a coffee shop to discuss the new baby, the mystery man appears to let Michael know that he sees the real mystery man through the window, and Michael chases after him. When a police artist (Chad Cleven) draws an image of the man, his real name is revealed to be Ed Hawkins (Kevin Weisman), another detective who took over Michael's spot at the police department after the crash, now working with Bird (Steve Harris), Michael's former partner in the "red reality" and his current one in the "green reality". Michael meets with Bird and Hawkins, and the latter says that he was one of the first on the scene of the crash and that he is sorry about Rex's death. Michael starts to believe that his son is really dead; he remembers the crash, yet again, with additional information. Michael realizes that Hawkins was trying to kill him in the crash. As soon as he figures out the situation, Michael wakes up with Rex and Emma; he is relieved to see Rex. After the carnival, Michael phones Dr. Evans to tell her what he now knows about the crash.

== Production ==
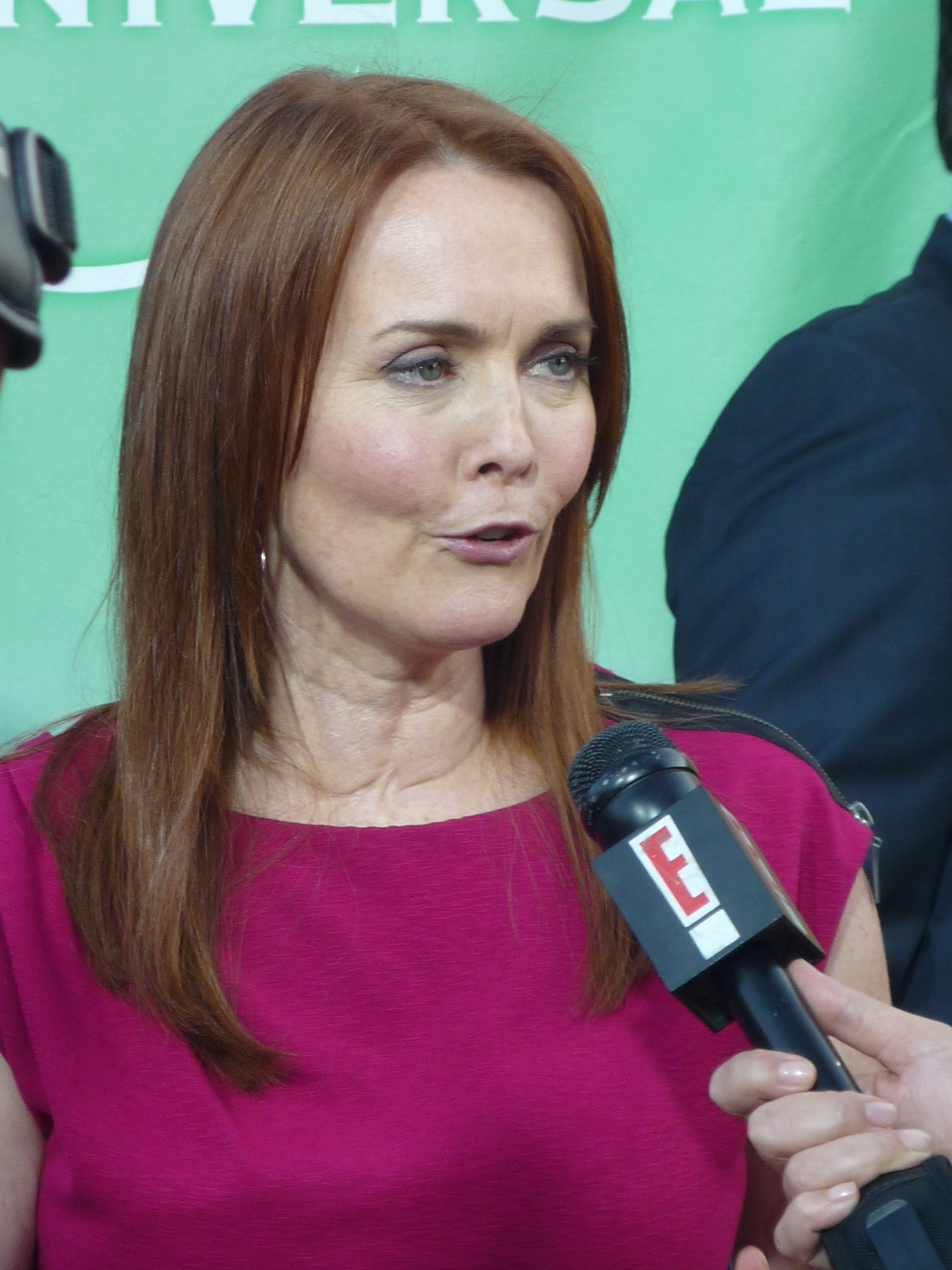
Recurring cast member Laura Innes directed the episode

The episode was written by Leonard Chang and series creator Kyle Killen. It was Killen's sixth credit and Chang's second writing acknowledgment for the show. The entry was directed by Laura Innes, who guest stars in the recurring role of Captain Tricia Harper in the series. It was Innes' first and only directing credit for Awake. Killen noted that, during the filming of the episode, he became "hungry" and wanted to "bend the rules" with the installment. He stated that the installment was a model episode that he wanted to "pursue with the show going forward". Killen also thought the last "three or four episodes" of Awake, including this episode, represent what the show's writers were able to accomplish throughout Awake's original run.

"Say Hello to My Little Friend" marked the first appearance of Hawkins, a detective who was described as a titular "little guy", from the series' second episode, "The Little Guy". Weisman obtained a recurring role in January 2012 and later garnered the role of the character. He was later revealed as the man who caused the Britten family's collision. This entry's production code was "1ATR10". It was filmed in Los Angeles, California.

Isaacs found "Say Hello to My Little Friend" the "most difficult [episode] to shoot" as one of the character's realities was fabricated and had to disappear by the end. To prepare himself for the episode, he imagined that he had suddenly lost his own child or that something awful happened to his family. While Isaacs had "played cheesy disco music" through filming the majority of the episodes, he played nothing during the filming of "Say Hello to My Little Friend". During a scene where Michael sits on the floor and starts crying, Isaacs had "no idea what came out of [his mouth]". That scene was shot three or four times with a different performance by Isaacs each time; the actor did not know which take Innes would use.

== Themes ==
"Say Hello to My Little Friend" continued and introduced key thematic elements to the series that were originally introduced in "The Little Guy". Key themes in this installment included when Michael was unable to see Rex and realized that Hawkins was trying to kill him in the car crash. It was described as a "show about grief" when it first started airing and that the "cause of the car crash didn't really matter" at that time. Now, however, The A.V. Club noted that Awake is "dabbling in crooked cops and God only knows what else". He observed that Michael could be having another defense to keep the fantasy world alive because of his thoughts with Hawkins.

The A.V. Club also thought that Hawkins was the reasoning for the second episode's name. Writing for HitFix, Alan Sepinwall observed that the episode came from Michael's perspective. According to Sepinwall, "Say Hello to My Little Friend" showed Hannah and Rex together for the first time in the flashback shortly before the crash. He opined that the only people who currently watch the series are "the ones who can quickly identify the red filter from the green filter and figure things out accordingly". Maggie Furlong from The Huffington Post thought that "Say Hello to My Little Friend" "surfaces some serious issues for Britten" that has only been "cryptically referenced" previously.

== Broadcast and reception ==
"Say Hello to My Little Friend" originally aired on NBC on May 10, 2012, and was first broadcast in the United Kingdom on Sky Atlantic on July 13, 2012. The episode's initial broadcast in the United States was viewed by approximately 2.51 million viewers. "Say Hello to My Little Friend" earned a Nielsen rating of 0.9, with a 2 share, meaning that roughly 0.9 percent of all television-equipped households and 2 percent of households watching television were tuned in to the episode.

A sneak peek was released online shortly before the episode's original broadcast. In the United Kingdom, the episode obtained 275,000 viewers, making it the third most-viewed program for the channel behind Alan Partridges: Mid Morning Matters and The Newsroom. Shortly after this episode was broadcast, NBC announced their decision to cancel Awake, due to declining ratings. Despite the series' cancellation, NBC still decided to air the remaining two episodes.

Before its original airing, "Say Hello to My Little Friend" was highly anticipated by commentators. In a review for "Slack Water", The A.V. Club claimed that "Say Hello to My Little Friend" would be "very cool" because Michael will "face a crisis when he stops waking up in [the green reality]". In a review for the same episode, Sepinwall called "Say Hello to My Little Friend" and the following episode "quite good".

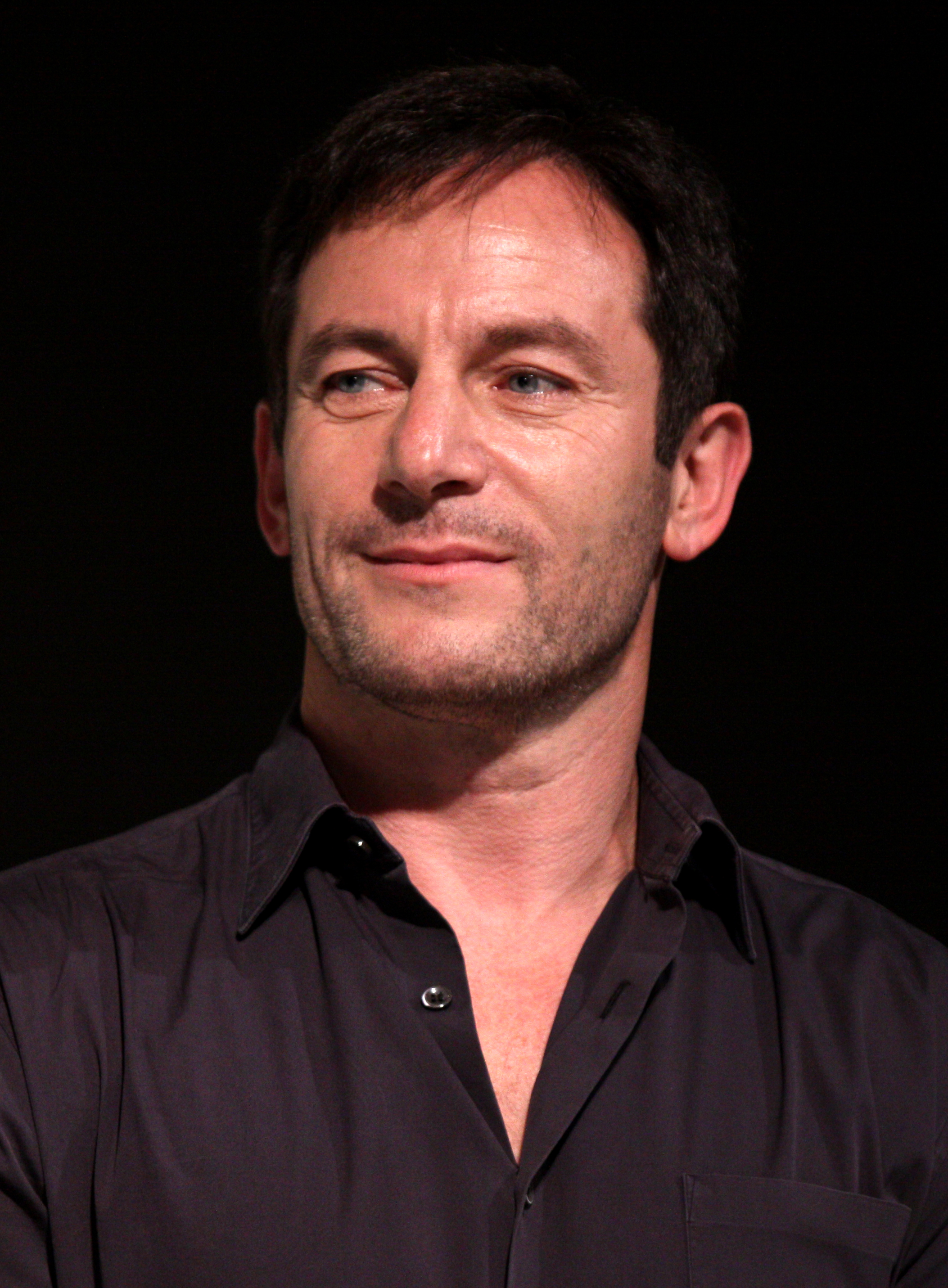
Critics felt that Jason Isaacs' performance deserved an Emmy Award.

This episode generally received positive reviews from critics. Commentators from IGN, Paste and TV Fanatic were pleased with Isaacs' performance; they felt that his performance deserved an Emmy Award. IGN's Matt Fowler described Isaacs' performance as "suspense"-worthy, while Paste writer Ross Bonaime thought that his acting deserved an Emmy nomination "at the very least". Although he did not note that his performance was Emmy-worthy, in his "A−" review, Zack Handlen from The A.V. Club claimed that Isaacs' is usually the "bad guy", but he seems like a "dad". Fowler gave the episode itself a "9.5 out of 10", classifying it as "amazing"; the entry's story was called "powerful". However, Bonaime gave the entry a "8.9" rating.

Fowler and Nick McHatton, a TV Fanatic critic, stated that this was the best episode of the program since "Pilot"; Handlen said that the episode, for the most part, was "a great hour of television, and a fine uptick from the last couple weeks of Awake", while Bonaime called it "one of Awake's most compelling episodes to date". McHatton called the emotional problems of the episode "heart wrenching" to watch", as they had him in tears; he gave a "4.9 out of 5" rating for the episode. Handlen complimented the "powerful scene, as [Michael] tries to convince her father that he should do anything possible to avoid losing touch with his daughter", and also noted that the episode "raises the stakes for [Michael], changing what he's come to accept as his routine for the first time since the start of the series: while bungee jumping at a fair with Rex and Emma in [the green reality], [Michael] has a fainting spell, and comes to in [the red reality]". Handlen claimed the episode "doesn't seem to fit everything else".

Sepinwall complained that viewers went into "the episode already knowing that the Britten family's car crash was anything but". Sepinwall noted that "as it played not only with the structure of the show, but the emotions of our hero by showing us what happens if he stops going to sleep in one reality and waking up in the other". According to Sepinwall, "Say Hello to My Little Friend" was "effective" as it "forced [Michael] to finally confront a truth about his situation", and that he finally needs to grieve, by recognizing that one of his two loved ones is dead. Sepinwall praised how the episode "kept mirroring moments in the pilot", while Screen Rant writer Kevin Yeoman called the installment itself "powerful" and "compelling". Yeoman compared Awake to Mission: Impossible, writing that "with just two episodes left", Awake has to go into Mission: Impossible mode to "provide answers".
