= Imperfect High =

2021 US-Canadian film

- Written by: Anne-Marie Hess
- Directed by: Siobhan Devine
- Starring: Nia Sioux; Sherri Shepherd; Gabriel Darku; Ali Skovbye
- Countries of origin: United States; Canada
- Original language: English

Production
- Producers: Tina Pehme; Kim Roberts
- Running time: 87 minutes
- Production companies: Brainstorm Media; Sepia Films; Just Singer Entertainment

Original release
- Network: Lifetime
- Release: September 18, 2021

Imperfect High is a 2021 drama film produced by Lifetime and starring Nia Sioux, Sherri Shepherd, Gabriel Darku and Ali Skovbye. The film premiered on September 18, 2021 on Lifetime. The film is a sequel to the 2015 movie Perfect High, which stars Bella Thorne, Israel Broussard, Daniela Bobadilla and Ross Butler.

== Plot ==
When high school junior Hannah Brooks and her mother move to Chicago, she begins attending Lakewood High School, the same school that is still affected by Riley's death from six years earlier. Suffering from an anxiety disorder, Hannah worries that she won't fit in; however, it soon becomes the least of her worries when she befriends a group of popular, wealthy students, encounters peer pressure, and develops a life-altering prescription drug addiction.

== Cast ==
- Nia Sioux as Hanna Brooks
- Sherri Shepherd as Deborah Brooks
- Gabriel Darku as Dylan Collins
- Ali Skovbye as Rose
- Anthony Timpano as Rob Walker
- Samuel Braun as Blake
- Andrew McNee as Mr. Arnet
- Princess Davis as Marcy
- Danyelle Tan as Fay
- Melice Bell as Fay
- Jamall Johnson as Principal Andrews
- Deborah Finkel as Nurse O'Connor
- Ecstasia Sanders as Administrator
- Miguel Castillo as Officer Mike
- Aiden Howard as Cy
- Matt Kennedy as Ben
- Eddie Canelea as Waiter

== Production ==
=== Pre-production ===
The movie was announced ahead of the International Day Against Drug Abuse and Illicit Trafficking, held on June 26. The producers also arranged to share the hotline and resource information for the Substance Abuse and Mental Health Services Administration on air and across the network's social media platforms.

Sioux said in an interview with WJLA-TV that she researched the opioid abuse climate in America to prepare for the role.

=== Filming ===
Filmed extensively in British Columbia, chiefly in several locations in Vancouver, production began on March 8, 2021, and wrapped up on March 26, 2021. The shooting took place almost entirely in the Lower Mainland region. Langley Christian High School stood in for Lakewood High.

=== Casting ===
Sherri Shepherd and Nia Sioux as Deborah Brooks and Hanna Brooks were cast in June 2021.

== Reception ==
Reviewer Lisa Marie Bowman wrote, "Perhaps there will be a third film — Rapidly Declining High, perhaps — that will explore whether or not the school itself is cursed. ... During its first hour or so, Imperfect High feels a bit overwritten. Everyone is snarky. Everyone has a quip. Rob is perhaps the worst offender. This is one of those films that sometimes seemed to be trying too hard to capture the way that teenagers talk. Things got a little better once Hannah got hooked on pills, if just because the focus went from Hannah and her friends to Hannah and her mother ... But Nia Sioux gives a good performance in her starring debut."

Trevor Wells of VocalMedia called the movie "unimaginative" and gave it a score of 6 out of 10, writing, "'Imperfect' is the ideal word to describe Imperfect High, due largely to how the movie's plot makes it feel less like a sequel and more like a remake. ... The fact that Hanna and her friends can do drugs and meet with their dealer on school property without getting caught even suggests that Lakewood has gotten even more lax in the wake of Riley Taft's death. But after a few overwrought rants from Rob Walker, this potential plot element is forgotten about in favor of rehashing the original's story beats. ... Their characterizations are almost the same as their 2015 counterparts, with only minor alterations. As such, despite the solid efforts of their actors, none of these characters feel as compelling as the ones they're copying."

Dish Nation, in their brief segment "Ticket or Skip It," voted to "ticket."
