= Britten family =

Family of fictional characters

The Brittens
- Awake family
- From left to right: Hannah, Rex, Michael
- First appearance: "Pilot"; March 1, 2012
- Last appearance: "Turtles All the Way Down"; May 24, 2012
- Created by: Kyle Killen

The Brittens are a family of fictional characters featured in the American television police procedural fantasy drama Awake. The Brittens are a nuclear family consisting of the married couple Michael and Hannah and their child son Rex. The family was involved in a car crash, which caused Michael, to live in two separate realities, one in which his wife Hannah was killed in the crash, and in the other his son Rex was killed.

The main characters reside in Los Angeles, California, in the United States, and were created by series executive producer and writer Kyle Killen, who conceived the idea after creating and developing Lone Star for the Fox network. The portrayal of the Britten family was praised by television critics. Alongside the three main family members, several other characters were mentioned.

== Main family ==
The Brittens are a family who live in Los Angeles, California, in the United States, at an unknown address. Michael, the father, works at the Los Angeles Police Department as a police detective, alongside his partner Isaiah Freeman, who he calls Bird. After a car crash, Michael, the father, has to live in two separate realities, one in which his wife Hannah was killed in the crash, and in the other his son Rex was the one killed. Also, in one reality, his now works with a new rookie partner Efrem Vega, where Isaiah goes to work in the Western Division with Ed Hawkins. In the other reality, he is still partnered with Bird. He sees two separate therapists: Dr. John Lee in one reality, and Dr. Judith Evans in the other. Michael is married to Hannah, an American housewife and mother. They have one son child: Rex, a school teenager who is very emotional, rude, and gets low grades after Hannah's death in that reality. His best friend is Cole, whom he works on a motorbike with. The family owns a Chevrolet as a vehicle.

=== Creation ===
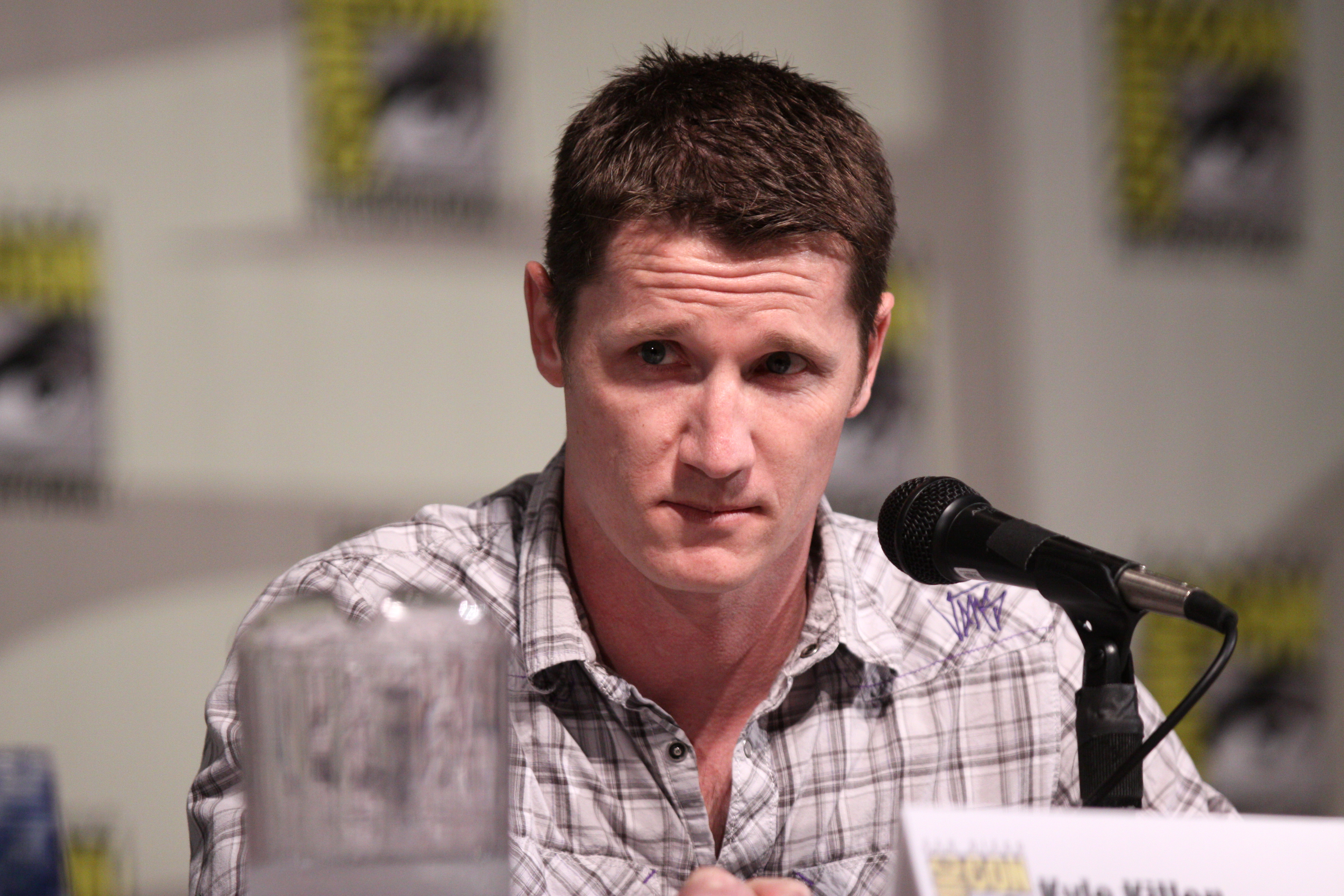
Kyle Killen created the Brittens after developing Lone Star for the Fox network.

Killen conceived of the idea for the Brittens after creating and developing Lone Star for the Fox network. NBC had encouraged Killen to conceive a concept for a future television series after Lone Star's cancellation. Within a few weeks, Killen sent a rough draft of the script to his agent Marc Korman. "It was 1 or 2 o'clock in the morning, and I remember I was so freaked out by the script that I went upstairs to our guest bedroom where my wife was sick with the flu and I got into bed with her," recalled Korman. "I called Jen and said: 'I'm telling you, this script is remarkable. I've never read a pilot like this, and for a guy who has never written a procedural show in his life, he's actually making two cases work". Initially, Salke and Korman looked to sell acquisition rights to Fox.

The Britten family debuted on March 1, 2012, in "Pilot", on the American police procedural drama television series Awake, which is a one-hour series broadcast on NBC. They last appeared on television on the same network, on May 24, 2012, in "Turtles All the Way Down".

=== Casting ===
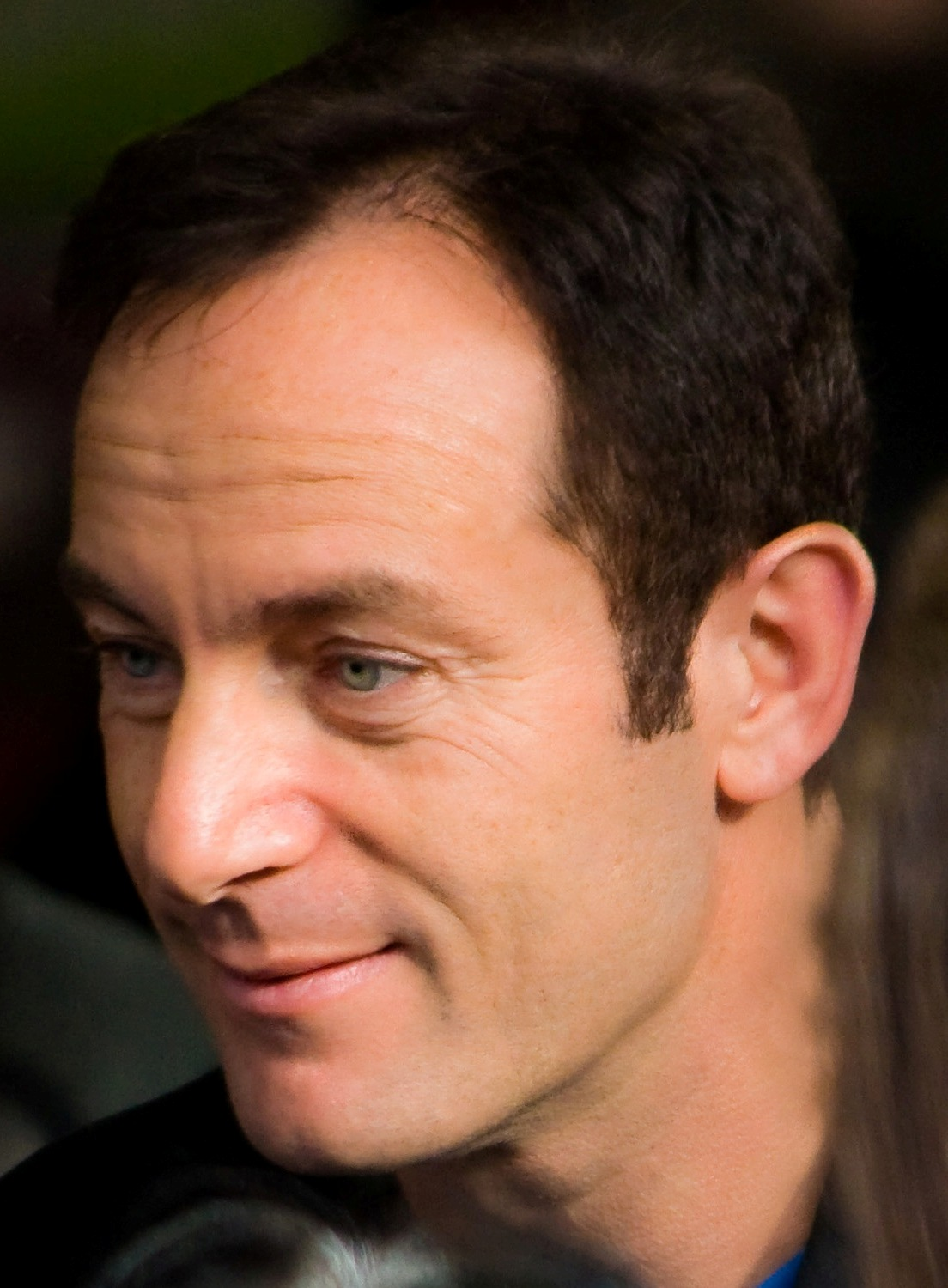
Isaacs was the first actor to be cast in the series.

In February 2011, Jason Isaacs obtained the role of Michael Britten, the central character of the series. Gordon summated the premise of the character: "He's a guy who goes to sleep, wakes up, he’s with his wife, goes to sleep, wakes up, and he's with his son. And so — and he's a cop who sees clues and details that crossover from one world to the next, and he uses that insight to solve crimes." Killen thought that the premise behind the series would be relatable to audiences, making it easier to broader his fanbase. "I think there were aspects of Lone Star that were more difficult to get a wider, broader audience interested in," he articulated. "[The main character] was somebody that you couldn’t decide if you liked or hated, and I think that Britten's dilemma is something that we’re not only sympathetic for, but somehow we want him to win." The succeeding month, Laura Allen was approached by producers to play Hannah Britten. Michaela McManus initially received the role, but was later given the role of Tara, whom Allen originally auditioned to play.

In March 2011, Dylan Minnette was cast as Rex Britten. Minnette commended the episode's script, and noted the auditioning sequence was fast. He stated, "The process of getting the job actually went by really fast because the first audition Kyle Killen [...] was in the room, Jason [Isaacs] was in the room, the cast director was in the room and the director was in the room. David Slade. And they were all there, for the first audition and I was like 'Wow! Okay.'" Minnette received the role two weeks after his audition.

=== Michael Britten ===
Michael Britten, portrayed by Jason Isaacs, is the father of the Britten family. He is married to Hannah, and has to live in two separate realities, after a car crash, one in which his wife Hannah was killed in the crash, and in the other his son Rex was the one killed. Also, in one reality, his now works with a new rookie partner Efrem Vega, where Isaiah goes to work in the Western Division with Ed Hawkins. In the other reality, he is still partnered with Bird. He sees two separate therapists: Dr. John Lee in one reality, and Dr. Judith Evans in the other. He wears a green wrist band in one reality, where Rex is alive, and a red wrist band in the other reality, where Hannah. He is seen very emotional in "Say Hello to My Little Friend", because he doesn't see his son. Because of his two realities, Michael now has routine to help him maintain the illusions of control.

=== Hannah Britten ===
Hannah Britten, portrayed by Laura Allen, is the well-meaning and emotional wife of Michael, and the mother of her son Rex. She is alive in Michael's "red reality". She began to renovate their home after the car crash. Though she hardly showed it, she felt great pain and grievance over the death of Rex and was saddened by the thought of his empty room upstairs.

=== Rex Britten ===
Rex Britten, portrayed by Dylan Minnette, is Michael's son who is featured in Michael's "green reality". Green is Rex's favorite color. He is a teenage school student. Outside of school, Rex claims he is going to the beach, although he is really going to his best friend Cole's house to work on a motorbike with him. Like Hannah, Rex is also very emotional, and often gets angry, due to Hannah's death in the crash. He kept a tennis racket to remain, and make him deal with Hannah's death. However, Cole accidentally broke it, Rex fights with him because of this. He later apologizes to him. He hates "cereal and soda night" because Michael doesn not cook "actual food" for dinner. Rex has an aunt named Carol, who is mentioned in "Two Birds", in Michael's "green reality". She wants to spend more time with Rex since the crash.

== Reception ==
The portrayal of the Britten family was praised by television critics. Ken Tucker of Entertainment Weekly was keen to Isaacs' acting in the series. "It helps enormously to have Isaacs playing the lead. This actor knows how to convey a gravity that contrasts well with the series' airy concept, but he avoids becoming heavy and morose." West summated that the cast "really couldn't be better on this series"; "Isaacs [delivered] a stellar performance as the intelligent detective, and loving father and husband who’s just trying to make sense of what’s going on and probably not entirely regretful to be experiencing a split reality. Cinema Blend's Kelly West claimed that "Laura Allen and Dylan Minnette also deliver strong performances as Michael's wife and son respectively". Critics IGN, TV Fanatic, and the Paste magazine all argued that Jason Isaacs performance deserves an Emmy.
