= Liam Aiken =

American actor (born 1990)

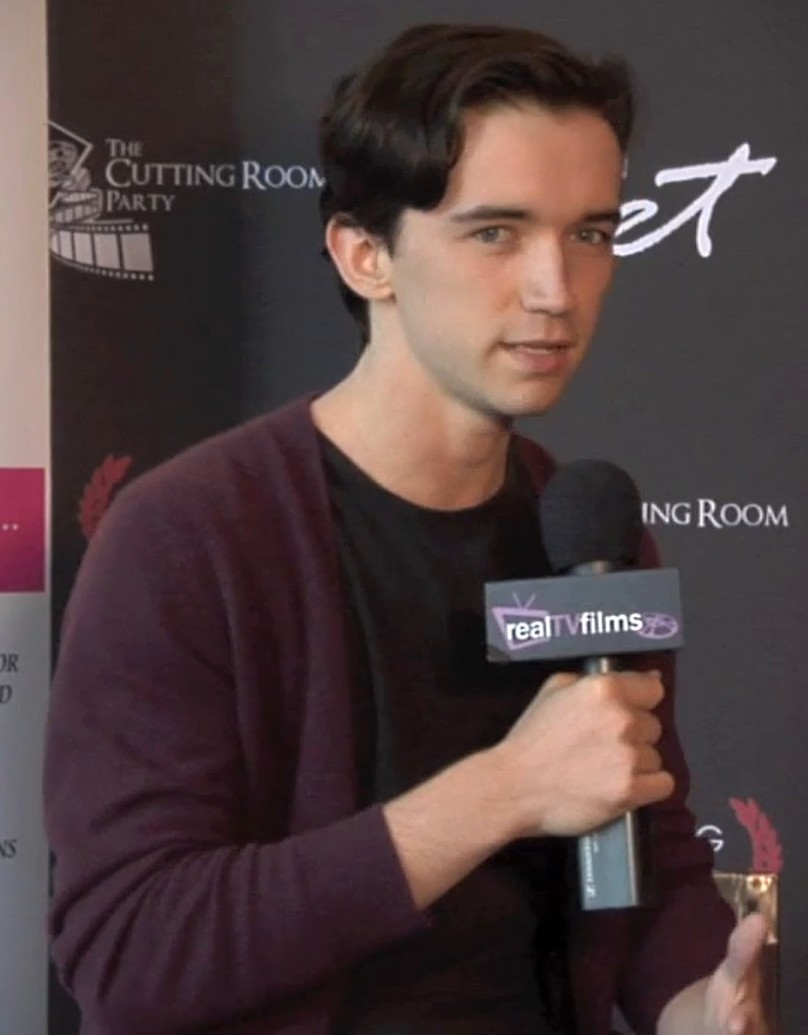
- Aiken in 2014
- Born: January 7, 1990 (age 36); New York City, New York, U.S.
- Education: Dwight-Englewood School; New York University
- Occupation: Actor
- Years active: 1997–present

Liam Pádraic Aiken (born January 7, 1990) is an American actor. He has starred in films such as Stepmom (1998), Road to Perdition (2002), and Good Boy! (2003), and played Klaus Baudelaire in Lemony Snicket's A Series of Unfortunate Events (2004), based on the series of books. He also starred in the films Nor'easter (2012), Ned Rifle (2014), The Bloodhound (2020), Bashira (2021), and V13 (2025).

== Personal life ==
Aiken is the only child of Moya Aiken, an Irish-born artist; and Bill Aiken, an American, MTV producer, who was of Scots-Irish descent. Bill died of esophageal cancer in September 1992, at age 34, when Liam was two years old. Aiken grew up in New Jersey and attended Dwight-Englewood School, graduating in 2008. He then went on to major in film at New York University. As of 2017, Aiken resides in Los Angeles.

== Career ==
Aiken appeared in a segment on Night After Night with Allan Havey when he was an infant. He would make his professional acting debut in a Ford Motor Company commercial by Ford Aerostar. He made his stage debut in the Broadway play A Doll's House at the age of seven, and his film debut in Henry Fool (1997). His first major film role came when he starred in Stepmom (1998). He appeared in Road to Perdition (2002) and the family film Good Boy! (2003). He was considered to play Cole Sear in The Sixth Sense (1999), but the role went to Haley Joel Osment. The following year, he was also considered for the role of Harry Potter due to his Irish heritage and Scottish ancestry, as well as his previous work with director Chris Columbus on Stepmom, but Daniel Radcliffe ultimately won the role, due to J. K. Rowling's insistence that the part should go to a British actor.

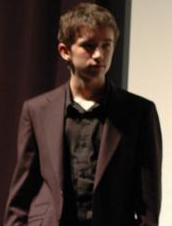
Aiken at the 2006 Toronto International Film Festival

Aiken went on to play intelligent 12-year-old orphan Klaus Baudelaire in Lemony Snicket's A Series of Unfortunate Events (2004). He also appeared in The Killer Inside Me (2010). In September 2011, he appeared in the CBS series A Gifted Man. From 2012 to 2015, he narrated the audiobook versions of All the Wrong Questions, a prequel series to A Series of Unfortunate Events.

In 2012, he portrayed a boy who returns home after being missing for years in Nor'easter, directed by Andrew Brotzman. In 2014, he played the title role in Ned Rifle, the third film in a trilogy that began with Henry Fool and continued with Fay Grim (2006). In 2020, he co-starred The Bloodhound, a mystery film inspired by the Edgar Allan Poe short story "The Fall of the House of Usher."

In 2021, he portrayed an electronic musician who suffering a series of nightmares with bizarre and mysterious appearances in Bashira, directed by Nickson Fong. He also played J.R. in Montauk, directed by Sean Nalaboff.

== Filmography ==
=== Film ===
Year	Title	Role	Notes
1997	Henry Fool	Ned	
1998	Montana	Kid	
1998	The Object of My Affection	Nathan	
1998	Stepmom	Ben Harrison	
2000	I Dreamed of Africa	Emanuele Gallmann (age 7)	
2001	Sweet November	Abner	
2001	The Rising Place	Emmett Wilder	
2002	Road to Perdition	Peter Sullivan	
2003	Good Boy!	Owen Baker	
2004	Lemony Snicket's A Series of Unfortunate Events	Klaus Baudelaire	
2006	Fay Grim	Ned Grim	
2010	The Killer Inside Me	Johnnie Pappas	
2012	Electrick Children	Mr. Will	
2012	Girls Against Boys	Tyler	
2012	Nor'easter	Boy/Josh Green	
2013	Munchausen	Son	Short film
2013	How to Be a Man	Bryan	
2014	Ned Rifle	Ned	
2015	The Frontier	Eddie	
2015	Weepah Way for Now	Reed	
2015	Let Me Down Easy	Hezekiah	Short film
2016	Like Lambs	Charlie Masters	
2017	The Emoji Movie	Ronnie Ram Tech	Voice
2017	The Honor Farm	Sinclair	
2020	The Bloodhound	Francis	
2021	Bashira	Andy	
2022	A Soldiers Heart		Short film
2025	Montauk	J.R.	previously called Kingfish;
2025	V13	Hugo	

=== Television ===
Year	Title	Role	Notes
1990	Night After Night with Allan Havey	Himself	
1998, 2007, 2024	Law & Order	Jack Ericson/Tory Quinlann/Thomas Norton	3 episodes
2002, 2009	Law & Order: Criminal Intent	Robbie Bishop/Jason	2 episodes
2011	A Gifted Man	Milo	2 episodes
2013	Mad Men	Rolo	Episode: "The Quality of Mercy"
2018	I'm Dying Up Here	Howard	Episode: "Plus One"

=== Stage ===
Year	Title	Role	Notes
1997	A Doll's House	Bobby Helmer	Belasco Theatre

=== Video games ===
Year	Title	Role	Notes
2004	Lemony Snicket's A Series of Unfortunate Events	Klaus Baudelaire	Voice

== Awards and nominations ==
Year	Award	Category	Result	Work	Notes
1999	Young Artist Award	Best Performance in a Feature Film - Young Actor Age Ten or Younger	Won	Stepmom	
2003	Young Artist Award	Best Performance in a Feature Film - Supporting Young Actor	Nominated	Road to Perdition	
2004	Young Artist Award	Best Performance in a Feature Film - Leading Young Actor	Nominated	Good Boy!	
2005	Young Artist Award	Best Performance in a Feature Film - Leading Young Actor	Nominated	Lemony Snicket's A Series of Unfortunate Events	
2005	Critics Choice Award	Best Young Actor	Nominated	Lemony Snicket's A Series of Unfortunate Events	
