= The Bloodhound (2020 film) =

- Poster
- Directed by: Patrick Picard
- Written by: Patrick Picard
- Produced by: Leal Naim; Thomas R. Burke
- Starring: Liam Aiken; Annalise Basso; Joe Adler
- Cinematography: Jake Magee
- Edited by: David Scorca
- Production companies: Love & Death Productions (LDP); Pfaff & Pfaff Productions
- Distributed by: Arrow Films
- Release date: December 1, 2020 (United States)
- Running time: 72 minutes
- Country: United States
- Language: English

The Bloodhound is a 2020 American mystery thriller film written and directed by Patrick Picard, inspired by the Edgar Allan Poe short story The Fall of the House of Usher.

== Premise ==
After being invited to visit a wealthy childhood friend and his twin sister at his home in a remote location, Francis is plagued by strange events.

== Cast ==
- Liam Aiken as Francis
- Annalise Basso as Vivian
- Joe Adler as Jean Paul Luret
- McNally Sagal as Dr. Ricki
- Kimleigh Smith as Mrs. Hoff
- Gaby Santinelli as Natasha
- Dylan Gentile as pianist

== Release ==
It was to be released at the Emergence Films Festival, but was canceled due to the COVID-19 pandemic. The film was later purchased to be distributed by Arrow Films in the United States, the United Kingdom, Canada, Australia, and New Zealand.

== Reception ==
On the review aggregator website Rotten Tomatoes, 93% of 14 critics' reviews are positive.

Writing for Variety, Dennis Harvey said that "those with an affinity for genre material in a cryptic, ascetic arthouse mode may fall under its chilly spell."

Writing for Starburst magazine, Laura Potier described the film as "undoubtedly best appreciated as an exercise in style". On Dread Central, Paul Grammatico wrote that "is a film that dispenses with the period piece trappings and brings Poe's macabre tale The Fall of the House of Usher into the modern-day."

Writing for Austin Chronicle, Richard Whittaker noted that the "Picard always pivots towards a bleak awkwardness. There's malice, even if it is often ill-defined." On Film Threat, Ali Arkani scored the film an 8 out of 10 writing in his review consensus section: "this creature does not kill or even hurt its victims."

=== List ===
It was listed by Paste magazine in 2021 as one of the "13 Best Edgar Allan Poe Adaptations".

== See also ==
- List of films impacted by the COVID-19 pandemic
- List of American films of 2020
- List of horror films of 2020
- List of mystery films
- List of thriller films of the 2020s
