= Texas Heart =

- Directed by: Mark David
- Written by: Nick Feild; Daniel Blake Smith
- Produced by: Mark David
- Starring: Erik Fellows; Kam Dabrowski; Daniela Bobadilla; Lin Shaye
- Cinematography: Mark David
- Edited by: Chris Bredesen
- Music by: Chad Rehmann
- Production company: DBS Films
- Distributed by: Indie Rights
- Release dates: 8 January 2016 (Albuquerque Film Festival); 3 June 2016 (US)
- Running time: 104 minutes
- Country: United States
- Language: English

Texas Heart is a 2016 American drama film directed by Mark David, starring Erik Fellows, Kam Dabrowski, Daniela Bobadilla and Lin Shaye.

== Cast ==
- Erik Fellows as Peter
- Kam Dabrowski as Tiger
- Daniela Bobadilla as Alison
- Lin Shaye as Mrs. Smith
- Johnny Dowers as Sheriff Dobbs
- John Savage as Carl
- Jared Abrahamson as Roy

== Reception ==
Gary Goldstein of the Los Angeles Times wrote that "The various story strands come crashing together in ways that are both beyond belief and strangely satisfying."

Sebastian Zavala Kahn of ScreenAnarchy wrote that "Despite trying to do two completely different things at the same time, “Texas Heart” manages to grab the viewer’s attention thanks to its portrayal of a small, Westernish town, and the development of its protagonists."
