= Face 2 Face (2016 film) =

2016 teen drama film directed by Matt Toronto

- Directed by: Matt Toronto
- Written by: Matt Toronto; Aaron Toronto
- Produced by: Ian Michaels; Matt Toronto; Aaron Toronto
- Starring: Daniela Bobadilla; Daniel Amerman
- Cinematography: Kristoffer Carrillo
- Edited by: Justine Gendron
- Production companies: Toronto Brothers; Green Step Productions
- Distributed by: Screen Media Films
- Release date: October 6, 2016 (Edmonton)
- Running time: 88 minutes
- Country: United States
- Language: English

Face 2 Face is a 2016 American independent teen drama film directed by Matt Toronto, who co-wrote the film with his brother and collaborator Aaron Toronto. It is presented as a computer screen film, being told almost entirely through a video chat screencast via webcam and smartphone cameras.

The film stars Daniella Bobadilla and Daniel Amerman as two childhood friends who rekindle their friendship by discussing their lives over the internet to cope with typical adolescent problems, and deals with subjects of sexual identity, teen suicide and parent-adolescent incestuous abuse.

== Plot ==
Michigan teenager Terrence Johnson (known by his nickname "Teel," given to him because of his inability to pronounce "Steel" while pretending to be Superman as a kid) contacts his childhood friend Madison Daniels, now living in California, via video chat after attempting suicide by overdosing on acetaminophen. The two are on opposite ends of the popularity spectrum: Madison is an "A-list party girl" and rebellious girl with a seemingly perfect life, while Teel is a social outcast struggling to make friends. Teel decides to audition for his school's production of Bye Bye Birdie in order to improve his social life, despite his parents wanting the self-admittedly unathletic teen to participate in sports; Madison convinces Teel to create a Facebook account to help him make friends. Madison's father is very strict and always in her face and punished her coming home late from her party. They have an estranged relationship because his father is retiring. While discussing her plan to attract her crush Cole, Madison takes Teel's comment that she looked "sweaty" in a beach photo to suggest he implied she looked slutty in the picture, abruptly ending the call even after Teel acknowledges she looked attractive in it.

The next day, Teel reveals to Madison that Sonny Dombrowski, another childhood friend who is now a popular jock at his school, accepted his Facebook friend request, but is recalcitrant about restarting their friendship in real life. Teel later reveals that he got in trouble at school after Sonny cheated off of Teel's test paper, as a harried Madison expresses exasperation with having to plan her father's retirement party. A day after Sonny comes to the house to make amends for cheating, Teel reveals he had been beaten up by a group of bullies, but is reluctant to disclose the reason behind the altercation. After Teel helps Madison do her makeup for a function she's attending at the school where her father works (using tips he learned from his beautician mother), Cole, who performed a song at the event, asks Madison out on a date. The day after a party where she was to meet up with Cole and finds out he had sex with her best friend Sophie, Teel assures Madison that she is intelligent and beautiful, and that the situation was for the best because she should want her first sexual experience to be special; Madison inadvertently reveals she already lost her virginity, but does not go into further detail. After having missed the Bye Bye Birdie audition to go on a family trip to visit his grandmother, Teel announces to Madison that he is auditioning to be the male lead in his school's production of Romeo and Juliet.

Madison, who has now developed feelings for Teel believing that he is infatuated with her, confesses how she feels about him and performs a striptease that he abruptly stop because it was illegal because of underage porn. She is dismayed to learn that Teel wants to keep their relationship platonic. He later apologizes about the misunderstanding and comes out to Madison as gay, revealing he had been beaten up by Sonny and his friends, having inadvertently recorded the incident on his phone camera, after they found out he and Teel had kissed during his visit days earlier. Madison suggests Teel start a gay-straight alliance at his school, though he is reluctant to come out publicly. After Teel reacts self-consciously, worried about what his friends would think, upon Madison sending a link to a gay-straight alliance organization to his Facebook page, Madison haphazardly offends Teel by blurting out that he does not have any friends beyond his Facebook following and herself; Madison attempts to reach Teel for several days afterward, only briefly getting in touch via instant messaging.

After reading bullying comments in a photo of an inebriated Madison vomiting in a toilet at a party, Teel finally decides to contact her. Through handwritten flashcards, Madison apologizes to Teel for pushing him to come out publicly against his reservations and tries to tell him that her father has been sexually abusing her since he lost his previous teaching job in Michigan, a secret unbeknownst to even her mother, who had died seven years earlier. She asks Teel to continue watching the webcam stream as her father enters Madison's bedroom to rape her. A distraught Teel calls 9-1-1 to report the abuse, though Madison, who is reluctant to turn in her only surviving parent, tells the police officers visiting her home that the call was a misunderstanding; she later informs Teel that she cannot talk to him anymore. Teel, by now with an improved real and virtual social life, decides to drive cross-country to California to rescue Madison, excusing himself from appearing in Romeo and Juliet by telling the play's director that he has to deal with a family emergency. Upon his arrival, Teel—who took his grandmother's car (which was gifted to him by his parents) and some of his father's money for the excursion—reveals that she helped him out of the despair that led to his suicide attempt, and, as her angry father bangs on her bedroom door, convinces Madison to escape with him through her window. Madison, now living with Teel and his family back in Michigan, gives Teel a superhero cape in an expression of gratitude for saving her from her situation.

== Cast ==
- Daniela Bobadilla as Madison Daniels
- Daniel Amerman as Teel Johnson
- Kevin McCorkle as David Daniels
- Emily Jordan as Sophie
- Mary Gordon Murray as Sharon Johnson
- Karrie Cox as Mrs. Spiceman
- Nick Reilly as Sonny
- Eric A.H. Watson as Cole
- Sheldon A. Smith as Erik
- Michael Soulema as Sam

== Distribution ==
Face 2 Face was originally distributed by Candy Factory Films, who licensed the film to Netflix for a two-year period, beginning on January 15, 2018. Candy Factory Films was eventually acquired by Screen Media Films, who currently own the worldwide distribution rights for the film.

== Accolades ==
- 2016 Edmonton International Film Festival - World Premiere - Winner of Brian Hendricks Award for Innovation
- 2017 Manhattan Film Festival - Official Selection
