= My Mighty Princess =

- Theatrical poster
- Hangul: 무림여대생
- Hanja: 武林女大生
- RR: Murim yeodaesaeng
- MR: Murim yŏdaesaeng
- Directed by: Kwak Jae-yong
- Written by: Shinho Lee; Kwak Jae-yong
- Produced by: Ahn Ho-wan; Ji Yong-jun
- Starring: Shin Min-a; On Joo-wan; Yoo Gun
- Cinematography: Chin Ting-chang
- Edited by: Kim Sang-bum; Kim Jae-bum
- Music by: Choi Seung-hyun
- Distributed by: Prime Entertainment
- Release date: 26 June 2008
- Running time: 122 minutes
- Country: South Korea
- Language: Korean
- Box office: US$162,256

My Mighty Princess (Korean: 무림여대생; lit. 'The impossible female student') is a 2008 South Korean film directed by Kwak Jae-yong.

== Synopsis ==
Kang So-Hwi is a college student and martial artist who possesses super-human strength and supernatural agility that drive others away from her. Later, an incident undermines her chance to talk to Jun-mo, the boy she loves. She gives up studying martial arts. She joins an ice hockey club where Jun-mo plays. She tries to get his attention, and Jun-mo ends up unwillingly riding with her on his motorbike.

The pair come to a police station, where Jun-mo regularly visits a female officer. The officer is around his mother's age, and is unwilling to return his affection, but Jun-mo persistently confesses his love to her. He follows the officer on her patrols on his motorbike. So-hwi hopes that Jun-mo may eventually return her feelings.

So-hwi's fighting skills diminish, leading her father to urge her to practice. He wants her to learn her mother's magic sword powers. So-hwi refuses. Her father reaches out to Ilyoung, the son of his friend, and asks him to convince So-hwi to continue martial arts in return for buying him an expensive motorcycle. Ilyoung is her lifelong friend and trained alongside her as a child. He waits for her after her classes. So-hwi jokingly rejects his attention while secretly grateful. He does not go away even though she keeps telling him to go and follows her everywhere.

Jun-mo gets into a street fight. So-hwi and Ilyoung save him with their superpowers using disguises but are easily found out. So-hwi tells Ilyoung of a frequent dream, however the ream was instead a forgotten memory.

Ilyoung and So hwi were the best of child martial artists so that only So-hwi can beat him. At that time, the villain Heuk-bong tries to steal the sword named Green Destiny, which can do the moon-stroke. Both So-hwi and Ilyoung attempt to protect that sword but Heuk-bong hits So-hwi and she fell off the cliff. Ilyoung jumps after her and takes her to the hospital where she recovers but loses her memories of the incident.

Joon mo asks So hwi to be their goalkeeper. After rebook from the police officer when he tried to kiss her he grows closer to So hwi. Revealing his mother died at a young age and the officer once saved his life. All the while Ilyoung look at them being friendly with each other.

So-hwi's father and his friends ask for a fight with Heuk-bong. On the day of the fight, So-hwi's father is shocked seeing that Heuk-bong is Ilyoung. Ilyoung injures So-hwi's father with the sword.

Ilyoung takes So-hwi's father to a hospital and informs So-hwi. So-hwi is informed by her father's friends about her mother's story. So-hwi trains on her mother's sword to create a lightning stroke.

Meanwhile, Ilyoung tells the story in his mind language of how he realised the sword was poisoned when Heuk-bong used it on So-hwi. Only Heuk-bong can cure So-hwi, so Ilyoung goes to him and asks for the antidote. Heuk-bong demands that Ilyoung become his disciple and hypnotizes him. Ilyoung accepts and cures So-hwi. Ilyoung was to take Heuk-bong's place. Heuk-bong dies without setting Ilyoung free, explaining why he injured So-hwi's father.

So-hwi completes her training on lightning stroke and goes to fight only to realize her opponent is Ilyoung. Through telepathy, Ilyoung tells her what has happened. So-hwi defends herself but won't fight back. Ilyoung asks her to fight back as he wants to escape his hypnotic spell.

Ilyoung intends to use moon stroke with the green destiny sword, So-hwi instead uses lightning stroke, which weakens Ilyoung. Ilyoung begs her to attack him, and attacks her. She fell down. Ilyoung gets hold of her neck and tries to kill her. But So-hwi asks him to concentrate. This confuses Ilyoung and in pain, he sheds tears. His tears fall onto the sword and awaken Ilyoung from the spell. So hwi confess that she remembered the past while listening to his mind language and she used to hear it long ago too when they were young. So-hwi's father wakes up from coma and Ilyong is in hospital looked after by his dad. The movie ends with Ilyoung deciding to confess his love to So-hwi the next time through mind language.

== Cast ==
- Shin Min-a: So-hwi
- On Joo-wan: Il-yeong
- Yoo Gun: Joon-mo
- Im Ye-jin: He-in
- Choi Jae-sung: Kap-seong
- Lee Dae-geun: Cheon-poong
- Kim Hyung-il: Chang-hak
- Dion Lam: Geol-wang
- Jeong Ho-bin: Heuk-bong
- Cha Tae-hyun: Pigeon Man (cameo)

== Release ==
My Mighty Princess was released in South Korea on 26 June 2008, after a delay of more than two years. On its opening weekend it was ranked eighth at the box office with 14,988 admissions; as of 6 July it had received a total of 27,309 admissions, with a gross of US$162,256.
