= Nor'easter (film) =

2012 film directed by Andrew Brotzman

- Directed by: Andrew Brotzman
- Written by: Andrew Brotzman
- Cinematography: Ian Bloom
- Edited by: David Lowery
- Music by: Danny Bensi; Saunder Jurriaans
- Production company: Nor'easter Productions
- Release date: October 13, 2012 (Mill Valley Film Festival)
- Running time: 86 minutes
- Country: United States
- Language: English

Nor'easter is a 2012 drama thriller film directed by Andrew Brotzman.

== Premise ==
After disappearing for years, a boy mysteriously returns to his family, and the young priest who hears the boy's confession grapples with the consequences of keeping it secret.

== Cast ==
- David Call as Erik Angstrom
- Richard Bekins as Richard Green
- Liam Aiken as Josh Green
- Haviland Morris as Ellen Green
- Rachel Brosnahan as Abby Green
- Danny Burstein as Paul Moore
- Geary Smith as David Kracauer
- Emory Cohen as Danny Strout
- Barb Bowers as doctor
- Clarissa Brown as Beth

== Release ==
It was released in 2012 in the Mill Valley Film Festival, and in 2017 on streaming.

== Reception ==
Dennis Harvey, writing for Variety said that the "consistently intriguing effort at times feels uncertain how to balance its emphasis on two central protags." On IndieWire, Gabe Toro gave it a score of B+, writing that "the film doesn’t resonate as sharply as it should (...) with an ending that will likely haunt most moviegoers long after the credits have rolled."
