= Good Boy! =

2003 film by John Robert Hoffman

- Theatrical release poster
- Directed by: John Hoffman
- Written by: Zeke Richardson; John Hoffman
- Produced by: Lisa Henson; Kristine Belson
- Starring: Molly Shannon; Liam Aiken; Kevin Nealon; Matthew Broderick
- Cinematography: James Glennon
- Edited by: Craig Herring
- Music by: Mark Mothersbaugh
- Production companies: Metro-Goldwyn-Mayer; Jim Henson Pictures (Note: Even though the company or "The Jim Henson Company" produced the film, their logo is not shown on any promotional material or in the movie itself.)
- Distributed by: MGM Distribution Co. (United States/Canada); 20th Century Fox (International)
- Release date: October 10, 2003
- Running time: 87 minutes
- Country: United States
- Language: English
- Budget: $18 million
- Box office: $45.3 million

Good Boy! is a 2003 American science fiction comedy film directed by John Hoffman, based on the book Dogs from Outer Space by Zeke Richardson; Hoffman and Richardson collaborated on the screen story, while Hoffman wrote the screenplay. The film stars Liam Aiken as Owen Baker, as well as the voices of Matthew Broderick, Delta Burke, Donald Faison, Brittany Murphy, Carl Reiner, Vanessa Redgrave, and Cheech Marin as the abundant dog characters in the film.

Good Boy! was released on October 10, 2003, by MGM Distribution Co. and received mixed reviews from critics.

== Plot ==
Owen Baker is a 12-year-old who has been working as the neighborhood dog-walker so he can earn the privilege of getting a dog of his own. Owen's hard work pays off when his parents, Mr. and Mrs. Baker, let Owen adopt a scruffy Border Terrier that he names Hubble. Owen has little time to make lasting friends, due to his parents' renovation and reselling of houses, so he hopes Hubble will be his best friend.

Owen does have a friend named Connie Flemming, a girl his age who lives in the neighborhood, but he is also bullied by two boys named Frankie and Fred. Soon after the adoption of Hubble, Owen finds out that his new abnormally intelligent dog actually came from outer space. Owen wakes up the next morning to discover that he can now understand every word Hubble says—including the ominous phrase: "Take me to your leaders."

Owen learns that dogs came to Earth thousands of years ago to colonize and dominate the planet. Hubble, who is really named Canid 3942, has been sent by the powerful Greater Dane on a mission from the Dog Star Sirius 7 to make sure dogs have fulfilled this destiny.

The dogs Owen walks include pampered Poodle Barbara Ann, rambunctious Boxer Wilson, nervous Italian Greyhound Nelly and Connie's gassy Bernese Mountain Dog Shep.

Despite the best efforts of Owen and this rag-tag group of neighborhood dogs to convince Hubble that everything is fine with Earth's dogs, Hubble soon discovers the awful truth about Earth dogs: "You're all pets!" Things get worse when Hubble learns that the Greater Dane is headed for Earth to do her own inspection. If things don't look right, all dogs on Earth will be recalled to Sirius.

Owen and Hubble have to work together to prepare the neighborhood dogs for a visit from the Greater Dane and her Chinese Crested Dog henchman. Owen, Hubble, Connie, and their canine pals set out to whip the other dogs into shape so that they can pass muster.

Owen's efforts fail and the Greater Dane recalls all dogs from Earth. Upset, Owen repairs Hubble's communicator and sends him a message declaring how much he loves him. The Greater Dane hears the message and is left curious by it so she approaches Hubble for his opinion on why the dogs on Earth are subservient to humanity when they should be ruling it. Hubble believes that the dogs and humans have formed a bond of love and loyalty. When asked where his own loyalty lies, Hubble asks the Greater Dane to refer to him as Hubble rather than Canid 3942, showing his bond with Owen. As a result, the Greater Dane sends the Earth dogs back and declares them a different breed. Hubble is allowed to return as well, but on the condition that he removes Owen's ability to communicate with dogs. Owen's parents choose to remain in town for once and Hubble starts to fit in as an Earth dog.

== Cast ==
- Liam Aiken as Owen Baker
- Molly Shannon as Mrs. Baker
- Kevin Nealon as Mr. Baker
- Brittany Moldowan as Connie Fleming
- George Touliatos as Mr. Leone
- Patti Allan as Ms. Ryan
- Hunter Elliott as Frankie
- Mikhael Speidel as Fred
- Benjamin Ratner as Wilson's Dad
- Peter Flemming as Wilson's Other Dad
- D. Harlan Cutshall as Mr. Fleming
- Brenda M. Crichlow as Mrs. Fleming
- Paul Vogt as Dog Catcher

=== Voices ===
- Matthew Broderick as Hubble, a Border Terrier
- Donald Faison as Wilson, a Boxer
- Brittany Murphy as Nelly, an Italian Greyhound
- Delta Burke as Barbara Ann, a Poodle
- Carl Reiner as Shep, a Bernese Mountain Dog
- Vanessa Redgrave as The Greater Dane, a Great Dane
- Cheech Marin as The Greater Dane's Henchman, a Chinese Crested Dog

== Production ==
In June 2002, it was announced Metro-Goldwyn-Mayer (MGM) had greenlit Good Boy, a co-production with The Jim Henson Company about an alien dog coming to Earth from Sirius, the Dog Star, to investigate interstellar reports that his fellow canines have abandoned their original plan to take over the planet. During the announcement, both MGM and Henson representatives expressed intentions for the film to serve as a franchise with similar expansion to series such as Beethoven, Air Bud, and Balto.

=== Special effects ===
The bulk of the digital effects in Good Boy! involved digitally altering the facial features of the dogs so that in the film, they appear to be talking or expressing a different emotion (sometimes called CG muzzle replacement). These effects were produced by Rainmaker Studios.

== Reception ==
The film's domestic total gross was around $37 million, with a worldwide gross of around $45 million. Good Boy! received mixed reviews from critics, earning a 44% rating at Rotten Tomatoes, based on 85 reviews. The site's consensus states: "Good Boy! should appeal to kids. Adults, however, might consider it a dog." Metacritic, which uses a weighted average, assigned the film a score of 49 out of 100, based on 30 critics, indicating "mixed or average" reviews.

Roger Ebert of the Chicago Sun-Times criticized the film's special effects, saying "Sometimes it works to show their lips moving (it certainly did in Babe), but in Good Boy! the jaw movements are so mechanical it doesn't look like speech, it looks like a film loop. Look at Babe again and you'll appreciate the superior way in which the head movements and body language of the animals supplement their speech."

A stop-motion short film animated by the BBC, Hamilton Mattress, accompanied the film's theatrical release.

=== Home media ===
Good Boy! was released on DVD and VHS by MGM Home Entertainment on March 2, 2004.

== See also ==
- The Starlight Barking
