= Perfect High =

2015 television film

- Written by: Anne-Marie Hess
- Directed by: Vanessa Parise
- Starring: Bella Thorne; Israel Broussard; Daniela Bobadilla; Ross Butler
- Countries of origin: United States; Canada
- Original language: English

Production
- Producers: Tina Pehme; Kim Roberts
- Cinematography: Mahlon Todd Williams
- Editor: Austin Andrews
- Running time: 85 minutes
- Production companies: Brainstorm Media; Sepia Films; Just Singer Entertainment

Original release
- Network: Lifetime
- Release: June 27, 2015

Perfect High is a 2015 drama film produced by Lifetime and starring Bella Thorne, Israel Broussard, Daniela Bobadilla and Ross Butler. The film premiered June 27, 2015 on Lifetime.

== Plot ==
Based on a true story. In the Chicago metropolitan area, Amanda, a passionate dancer, suffers a nasty fall during a pep rally that leads her to taking hydrocodone. Due to her loneliness and not being able to dance, she soon becomes friends with a group of popular seniors who introduce her to a life-altering addiction to heroin.

== Cast ==
- Bella Thorne as Amanda
- Israel Broussard as Carson
- Daniela Bobadilla as Riley
- Ross Butler as Nate
- Matreya Fedor as Brooke
- Jasmine Sky Sarin as Alexis
- Cassidy Alexa as Bridget
- Ryan Grantham as Robbie
- Aren Buchholz as Rick
- Lucia Walters as Coach Yost

== Production ==
=== Pre-production ===
On February 2, 2015 it was announced Bella Thorne was the final person cast as the main character Amanda, who becomes a heroin addict, alongside Israel Broussard, Daniela Bobadilla and Ross Butler who would all portray Thorne's character's friends. Prior to casting, the film was tentatively titled Chasing the Tiger.

=== Filming ===
Production began on February 1, 2015 and ended on February 22, 2015, with a total of 17 days of shooting. In an interview, Bella Thorne said that she had known Israel Broussard since she was 12, and that she was the one who told him to audition for the role of Carson.

In a video interview with production company Sepia Films, Thorne said,

"I cried a lot in this film. One scene, I'm coming out to my parents about being a heroin addict, and the next scene I'm dancing and having an amazing time with my friends. That's the really hard part, is going from full-on heroin look to innocent Amanda where she starts using. ... It's not a light film. ... You have to keep it realistic. So sometimes I get a little depressed on set while working, but I have an amazing crew and cast. Like, a lot of actors just hang out with their cast, but, I mean, I love my crew."

== Sequel ==
In 2021, Lifetime produced a sequel entitled Imperfect High starring Nia Sioux as Hanna Brooks. The film covers important topics such as anxiety disorder and the opioid crisis.

== Reception ==
=== Critical response ===
The review site Common Sense Media gave the movie 3 out of 5 stars and wrote, "Parents need to know that Perfect High is an intense story about teen drug addiction that's based on real-life events. The message is valuable for both teens and their parents, but it's not a relaxing journey through a girl's downward spiral from painkiller abuse to heroin use. You'll see teens popping pills, smoking, snorting, and shooting up on their own and at "pharm" parties, all while they deceive their families and steal to fund their habit. Their health suffers, and a main character eventually dies from an overdose. That said, there are many scenes that show them riding drug-induced highs, so it's vital that your teens grasp the story's cautionary message as well."

TVLine called it a "high-octane drama": "Thorne stars as Amanda, a high-school dancer whose life spirals into disarray when she suffers a nasty fall — hence her new nickname, "that chick who fell" — during an intense rehearsal. How far into disarray does it spiral, you ask? Our girl Mandy falls into a seriously bad crowd, whose members demand she feed them her pills. ... After discovering that her new pals are knowingly doing heroin, Amanda attempts to dance again ... though she swears it's only going to be a short ride; "Maybe this will help me get through my audition," she says while sticking a needle into her arm."

The A.V. Club gave the film a score of C− with the comment, "While Lifetime's spotty track record for its movies is well documented, it's especially disappointing here, as the story's ripe lowbrow potential is emblazoned right onto the promotional posters for the film. ... But that first free hit of meta-commentary on the "bad kids" subgenre is followed by the steep price of Perfect High's utter lack of interest in exploiting its subject matter. The story is doggedly straight-faced, even as Amanda spirals from goody two-shoes into drug-addled vomitorium, nodding off after shooting up at the mall in the middle of the day. The film's desire to warn kids of the dangers of drugs ends up as more of a warning to kids about the dangers of earnest Lifetime movies."

Jessica Radloff of Glamour writes of "10 Crazy Thoughts From Watching Perfect High," with her thoughts including "8. Common Sense FINALLY Kicks In Over Heroin: Because driving under the influence, almost getting into a deadly car crash, and taking other drugs weren't enough to scare the crap out of these teens. Let's hear it for heroin being the voice of reason!"
