= Haviland Morris =

American actress

- Occupations: Actress; real estate agent
- Years active: 1984–present
- Spouse: Robert Score
- Children: 2

Haviland Morris is an American film, television, and Broadway actress, best known for playing Caroline Mulford in Sixteen Candles, who currently works in real estate.

== Career ==
Haviland Morris is most famous for her role as Caroline Mulford in Sixteen Candles. She was also in Madonna's Who's That Girl (1987) and Gremlins 2: The New Batch (1990).

Morris played Karen Pruitt in Home Alone 3 in 1997 and Dr. Claire Baxter on One Life to Live from 2001–2003. She provided the voice for Michelle Payne in the popular video game Max Payne. She has appeared in three Law & Order series (Law & Order, Law & Order: Special Victims Unit, and Law & Order: Criminal Intent), as well as Sex and the City and other shows. In 2007, she appeared in the independent film Cherry Crush. In 2008, she made several appearances on One Tree Hill as a counselor.

In 2023, Morris returned to the Gremlins franchise with a supporting role in Gremlins: Secrets of the Mogwai.

== Personal life ==
Morris is married to Robert Score. They have a daughter, Faith, born in 1991, and a son, Henry, born in 2000. She later began working as a licensed real estate associate broker, but occasionally makes guest appearances in television.

== Filmography ==
Film
Year	Title	Role
1984	Reckless	Mary Pat Sykes
1984	Sixteen Candles	Caroline Mulford
1987	Who's That Girl	Wendy Worthington
1990	Love or Money	Jennifer Reed
1990	A Shock to the System	Tara Liston
1990	Gremlins 2: The New Batch	Marla Bloodstone
1997	Home Alone 3	Karen Pruitt
2003	Rick	Jane
2005	The Baxter	Kate Lewis
2007	Joshua	Monique Abernathy
2007	Cherry Crush	Julia Wells
2009	Adam	Lyra
2010	Fighting Fish	Lucy
2011	Burning Blue	Grace Lynch
2011	Oka!	Lydia Blake
2012	Jack & Diane	Jack's Mom
2012	Nous York	Mrs. Johns
2012	Nor'easter	Ellen Green
2013	Burning Blue	Grace Lynch
2016	Better Off Single	Angela's Mom

Television
Year	Title	Role	Notes
1985	Royal Match	Susan	Television film
1986	George Washington II: The Forging of a Nation	Henrietta Liston	Television film
1986	Family Ties	Sharon McElroy	Episode – "Starting Over"
1988	Tales from the Darkside	Sarah McBride	Episode – "The Apprentice"
1989	Men	Patti	Episode – "The Trouble with Harvey"
1989–1990	American Playhouse	Dodie Griffin; Amy-Joy; Cal's Sister	Episode – "Love and Other Sorrows"; Episode – "Life Under Water"; Episode – "Andre's Mother"
1990	Law & Order	Polly Norris	Episode – "Kiss the Girls and Make Them Die"
1994	Diagnosis: Murder	Shanda	Episode – "Shanda's Song"
1995	New York News	Mae Martin	Episode – "You Thought the Pope Was Something"
1996	Dead Man's Walk	Lady Lucinda Carey	Television miniseries Episode 3
1996	Aliens in the Family	Holly Turner Wattman	Episode – "Dissected and Neglected"
1998	Cosby	Jeannie	Episode – "Brazil"
1998	Law & Order	Molly Kilpatrick	Episode – "Divorce"
1998	Sex and the City	Brooke	Episode – "The Turtle and the Hare"
1999	Homicide: Life on the Street	Elanor Burke	Episode – "Self Defense"
2000	Madigan Men	Mary McManus	Episode – "Like Father, Like Son"
2001	Law & Order: Criminal Intent	Karen Cove	Episode – "The Extra Man"
2001–2003	One Life to Live	Claire Baxter	75 episodes
2002–2003	Third Watch	Barbara Kenney; Mrs. Kenny	Episode – "The Greater Good"; Episode – "Fury"
2003	Law & Order: Special Victims Unit	Dawn Trent	Episode – "Desperate"
2008	Canterbury's Law	Anne Matthews	Episode – "Sweet Sixteen"
2008	One Tree Hill	Olivia	Episode – "Echoes, Silence, Patience, and Grace"; Episode – "Bridge Over Troubled Water"; Episode – "You've Dug Your Own Grave, Now Lie in It"
2009	Law & Order: Criminal Intent	Mrs. Wellsley	Episode – "Salome in Manhattan"
2009	Army Wives	Dr. Melinda Jernigan	Episode – "First Response"
2010	As the World Turns	Bridget Lawson	3 episodes
2012	The Good Wife	Jody Vaughn	Episode – "Here Comes the Judge"
2014	Blue Bloods	Lorraine Tomlin	Episode – "Above and Beyond"
2016	Elementary	Dr. Jane Mortimer	"Hounded"
2016	Quarry	Susan	2 episodes
2019	City on a Hill	Kate Southworth	Episode – "The Wickedness of the Wicked Shall Be; Upon Himself"
2022	Bull	Dr. Adrienne Corbett	Episode – "With These Hands"
2023	Gremlins	Theodora (voice)	2 episodes

Other work
Year	Title	Role	Notes
1993	The Last Supper	Shell	Short film
1996	Dear Diary	Christie	Short film
2001	Max Payne	Michelle Payne	Voice; Video game
