= Raising Dad =

American television sitcom (2001–02)

- Genre: Sitcom
- Created by: Jonathan Katz
- Starring: Bob Saget; Kat Dennings; Brie Larson; Meagan Good; Andy Kindler; Jerry Adler; Ben Indra
- Theme music composer: Noah Hartman
- Country of origin: United States
- Original language: English
- No. of seasons: 1
- No. of episodes: 22

Production
- Executive producers: Jonathan Katz; Andy Ackerman; John Markus; Bob Saget; Norman Steinberg
- Camera setup: Multi-camera
- Running time: 22 minutes
- Production companies: Albion Productions; Paramount Television

Original release
- Network: The WB
- Release: October 5, 2001 – May 10, 2002

Raising Dad is an American television sitcom that aired on The WB from October 5, 2001, to May 10, 2002. The series stars Bob Saget on his first television series since Full House ended in 1995. It also stars Kat Dennings, Brie Larson, Riley Smith, Beau Wirick and Jerry Adler, and was produced by Albion Productions in association with Paramount Television.

== Premise ==
Matt Stewart is a widower trying to raise his two daughters, Sarah and Emily, with the help of his live-in father, Sam, a former baseball player for the Boston Red Sox. Further complicating matters, Matt works as an English teacher at Sarah's high school. Matt struggles to keep his nose out of his daughter's social life while attempting to find his own.

== Cast ==
=== Main ===
- Bob Saget as Matt Stewart
- Kat Dennings as Sarah Stewart
- Brie Larson as Emily Stewart
- Meagan Good as Katie
- Andy Kindler as Mr. Travers
- Jerry Adler as Sam Stewart
- Ben Indra as Josh (from episode 12; recurring previously)

=== Recurring ===
- Fred Stoller as Bert
- Riley Smith as Jared Ashby
- Beau Wirick as Evan
- Camille Guaty as Olivia
- Tembi Locke as Vice Principal Liz Taylor

== Episodes ==
No.	Title	Directed by	Written by	Original release date	Viewers (millions)
1	"Pilot"	Andy Ackerman	Jonathan Katz	October 5, 2001	4.53
Matt can't stop sharing personal information about Sarah with his high school English class. Sam and Emily are lying to her school so she can spend more time at home.
2	"Sex Ed"	Lee Shallat Chemel	Bill Braudis	October 12, 2001	3.53
Matt agrees to be a substitute teacher for a Sex Ed class, not realizing that Sarah will be in attendance. Emily is researching careers in the want ads and Sam misplaces his car at the mall and worries that he might be losing his marbles.
3	"Baby, You Can't Drive My Car"	Lee Shallat Chemel	Bill Masters	October 19, 2001	3.28
Sarah wants to get her license, but her driving lessons don't go as planned because her dad is a nervous driver. Matt's feelings get hurt when Sarah searches for a less stressful substitute. With Grandpa's help, Emily makes a Rube Goldberg machine for a school contest.
4	"For Mature Audiences Only"	Philip Charles MacKenzie	Nancy Cohen	October 26, 2001	3.4
5	"Fight for Your Right to Party"	Philip Charles MacKenzie	B. J. Novak	November 2, 2001	4.28
6	"We'll Always Have Scrabble"	Dana DeVally Piazza	Kimberly Karp & Phil Breman	November 9, 2001	3.77
7	"The Drama Club"	Dana DeVally Piazza	Story by : Jonathan Katz; Teleplay by : Jonathan Katz & Bill Braudis	November 16, 2001	3.7
8	"The New Room"	Lee Shallat Chemel	Miriam Trogdon	December 7, 2001	3.33
9	"Teacher Evaluations"	Wil Shriner	Chuck Sklar	December 14, 2001	3.92
10	"Matt&Sarah@Gossip.com"	Wil Shriner	Adam Markowitz & Marc Rubel	January 11, 2002	3.2
11	"First Date"	Wil Shriner	Norman Steinberg	January 18, 2002	2.8
12	"Sam's Enchanted Evening"	John Whitesell	Jim Armogida & Steve Armogida	January 25, 2002	2.9
13	"Mentor Matt"	Ken Whittingham	B. J. Novak	February 1, 2002	2.62
14	"The Math Problem"	Philip Charles MacKenzie	Nancy Cohen	February 15, 2002	2.4
15	"Attending a Family Dysfunction"	Wil Shriner	Ed Driscoll	February 22, 2002	2.70
16	"Miss Communication"	Wil Shriner	Bill Braudis & Jonathan Katz	March 22, 2002	2.72
17	"A Kiss Is Still a Kiss"	Wil Shriner	Robert Bruce	April 5, 2002	2.80
18	"Home Plates"	Lee Shallat Chemel	Jimmy Aleck & Jim Keily	April 12, 2002	2.2
19	"The House of Stewart"	Will Mackenzie	Kimberley Karp & Phil Breman	April 19, 2002	2.4
20	"Bully"	Will Mackenzie	Chuck Sklar	April 26, 2002	2.07
21	"Daughter Nose Beat"	Wil Shriner	Ed Crasnick	May 3, 2002	3.29
22	"Losing It"	Norman Steinberg	Norman Steinberg & Bill Masters	May 10, 2002	2.50

== Reception ==
Carole Horst of Variety reviewed the first episode of Raising Dad and wrote: "a family trying to cope with the death of the mother... isn't funny, but it is touching at times", and added that the cast "is fine, and "Dad" shows some promise. It probably will keep Reba's audience tuned in to end a nice family night of TV."
