= Shinho Lee =

South Korean screenwriter (born 1977)

- Born: April 29, 1977 (age 49); Seoul, South Korea
- Occupation: Screenwriter
- Years active: 2003 to present

Korean name
- Hangul: 이신호
- Hanja: 李臣鎬
- RR: I Sinho
- MR: I Sinho

Shinho Lee (born 1977) is a South Korean screenwriter and playwright. He is best known for co-writing the critically acclaimed Na Hong-jin's film The Chaser (2008), as well as for adapting the scripts for Sayonara Itsuka (2010) and While the Women Are Sleeping (2016).

== Early life and education ==
Lee pursued his education in the United States, receiving a Bachelor of Fine Arts (BFA) in Film & TV and a Master of Fine Arts (MFA) in Dramatic Writing from the Tisch School of the Arts at New York University. He is also an alumnus of the American Film Institute's Screenwriting Program.

== Career ==
=== Beginning ===
Lee began his career as a playwright. His plays include "The Water Mirrors" (produced in 2001 as part of American Living Room with Lincoln Center & Here Arts Center) and "Butterfly" (produced in 2001 as part of Director’s Company’s Don’t Blink with Second Stage Theatre).

He later gained recognition for his play. Lee's screenplay "The Red Snow" was the Grand Prize Winner of The 2003 Harley-Merrill International Screenwriting Award (sponsored by MPA and RKO Pictures) and the winner of The 2002 CAPE (Coalition of Asian Pacifics in Entertainment) Foundation’s New Writers Award (sponsored by 20th Century Fox). His play "Dream of No Words" was featured at Hartford Stage's 2003 Brand New Reading Series.

=== Film breakthroughs ===
Lee's career-defining work came with the 2008 South Korean thriller The Chaser, which he co-wrote. Directed by Na Hong-jin, the film was one of the highest-grossing films in South Korea that year and was invited to the 2008 Cannes Film Festival for the Official Selection Midnight Screening. The film's success led to its remake rights being acquired by Warner Bros.

In 2010, Lee wrote the screenplay for Sayonara Itsuka (サヨナライツカ, Saying Good-bye, Oneday), a Japanese film based on the novel by Hitonari Tsuji, which starred Miho Nakayama.

In 2016, his adaptation of the Javier Marías short story, While the Women Are Sleeping, was released. Directed by Wayne Wang (Smoke, The Joy Luck Club, Maid in Manhattan), the film screened in the Official Panorama Special section at the 66th Berlin International Film Festival.

=== Other projects ===
His other screenplays include Last September (to be produced by Terence Chang, known for Face/Off, Red Cliff and Mission: Impossible 2) and Tokyo Year Zero (based on the novel The Damned Utd by David Peace).

In 2023, it was reported that Lee is writing the feature film Sunset Park, set in the US and Korea, which will be produced by Barunson, the company behind Bong Joon-ho's Parasite (2019).

== Filmography ==
- Kimono (1998) - director, screenplay
- My Mighty Princess (2008) - screenplay
- The Chaser (2008) - screenplay
- Sayonara Itsuka (サヨナライツカ; Saying Good-bye, Oneday; 2010) - screenplay
- While the Women Are Sleeping (2016) - screenplay
