= While the Women Are Sleeping =

2016 film

- Theatrical release poster
- Directed by: Wayne Wang
- Written by: Javier Marías (short story); Michael Ray; Shinho Lee; Mami Sunada
- Produced by: Yukie Kito; Tōichirō Shiraishi
- Starring: Takeshi Kitano
- Cinematography: Atsuhiro Nabeshima
- Edited by: Deirdre Slevin
- Music by: Youki Yamamoto
- Production companies: Dentsu; Bandai Visual; Parco; Excellent Films; Avex Pictures; Aoyama Mainland
- Distributed by: Toei Company
- Release dates: 17 January 2016 (Waseda Film Festival); 27 February 2016 (Japan)
- Running time: 103 minutes
- Country: Japan
- Language: Japanese

While the Women Are Sleeping (Japanese: 女が眠る時, Hepburn: Onna ga Nemuru Toki) is a 2016 Japanese drama film directed by Wayne Wang. It was shown in the Panorama section at the 66th Berlin International Film Festival.

== Cast ==
- Takeshi Kitano
- Hidetoshi Nishijima
- Sayuri Oyamada
- Shioli Kutsuna
- Hirofumi Arai
- Makiko Watanabe
