= Laura Adler =

American casting director (1960–2026)

- Born: July 1, 1960; New York, U.S.
- Died: January 22, 2026 (aged 65); Los Angeles, California, U.S.
- Occupation: Casting director
- Parent: Jerry Adler (father)
- Relatives: Joe Adler (nephew)

Laura Adler (July 1, 1960 – January 22, 2026) was an American casting director. She was nominated for a Primetime Emmy Award in the category Outstanding Casting for her work on the television program American Dreams. Her nomination was shared with Natalie Hart, Jason La Padura and Coreen Mayrs.

Adler died in Los Angeles, California on January 22, 2026, at the age of 65.
