= Mary Gordon Murray =

American actress

- Born: November 13, 1953 (age 72); Ridgewood, New Jersey, U.S.
- Education: Immaculate Heart Academy
- Occupation: Actress
- Years active: 1976–present
- Known for: One Life to Live; Little Me; The Most Happy Fella
- Awards: Drama-Logue Award

Mary Gordon Murray (born November 13, 1953) is an American actress and singer. She received a Tony Award nomination for Best Actress in a Musical for the 1982 musical, Little Me.

== Life and career ==
Murray was born in Ridgewood, New Jersey. Raised in nearby Fair Lawn, she graduated from Immaculate Heart Academy.

She made her Broadway debut in the 1976 Broadway revival of musical The Robber Bridegroom. She later performed in Broadway production of Grease, I Love My Wife, Play Me a Country Song, Coastal Disturbances, Into the Woods, Footloose, Hands on a Hardbody, Cabaret and Three Tall Women. Her most notable role was in the 1982 musical, Little Me receiving Tony Award nomination for Best Actress in a Musical. She was in the original production of A... My Name Is Alice on Off-Broadway in 1983. In 1991 she received Drama-Logue Award for performance in The Most Happy Fella. She is a faculty member of the American Musical and Dramatic Academy.

On television, Murray played Becky Lee Abbott in the ABC daytime soap opera, One Life to Live on regular basis from August 1979 until May 1985. Murray later made several guest appearances in 1986, 1988, 1996, 1998 and from November 15 to 19, 2001. She made guest-starring appearances in television series such as Kate & Allie, Matlock, Civil Wars, Melrose Place, Murder, She Wrote, Murphy Brown, The Drew Carey Show, Jack & Bobby, Cold Case, Bones, CSI: Crime Scene Investigation and Nip/Tuck. Murray had recurring roles on L.A. Law and Quantum Leap.

In film, Murray appeared in Poison Ivy (1992), Born Yesterday (1993), Junior (1994), Evolver (1995), DC 9/11: Time of Crisis (2003), and Face 2 Face (2016).

=== Film ===
Year	Title	Role
1986	Rockabye	Audrey
1989	Love and Betrayal	Jeannine
1992	Poison Ivy	M.D.
1993	Born Yesterday	Bindy Duker
1994	Junior	Betty
1995	Evolver	Miss. Renzetti
2001	Santa, Baby!	Additional Voices
2003	DC 9/11: Time of Crisis	Laura Bush
2016	Face 2 Face	Sharon Johnson

=== Television ===
Year	Title	Role	Notes
1979-1984	One Life to Live	Becky Lee Abbott #2	45 Episodes
1987	Leg Work	Alisha	Episode: Blind Trust
1988	Kate & Allie	Liz	Episode: Kate Gets Dumped
1992	Matlock	Diane Becker	2 Episodes
1992	L.A. Law	Karen Alder	3 Episodes
1992	Civil Wars	Nan Buffum	Episode: Below the Beltway
1992	Quantum Leap	Leta Aider	3 Episodes
1994	The 5 Mrs. Buchanans	Dr. Milmur	Episode: Five Buchanans and a Baby
1994	Melrose Place	Donna Teller	Episode: Holiday on Ice
1995	University Hospital	Ellen Merrick	Episode: Crisis in 2E
1995	Murder, She Wrote	Pauline Higgins	Episode: The Dream Team
1995	Aaahh!!! Real Monsters	Opera Singer/Angel	Episode: Rosh O' Monster/The Tree of Ickis
1995	The Jeff Foxworthy Show	Eunice	Episode: A Sore Winner
1996	Almost Perfect	Janet	2 Episodes
1996	Murphy Brown	Helen	Episode: Stepping Out
1997	The Drew Carey Show	Judy	Episode: A Very, Very, Very Fine House
2004	Jack & Bobby	Martha Truggman	2 Episodes
2005	Cold Case	Kitty 2005	Episode: Schadenfreude
2006	Rodney	Sandy	Episode: Love is in The Air
2006	Numb3rs	Marlene Stallworth	Episode: Dark Matter
2006	Bones	Charlotte Craft	Episode: The Girl with the Curl
2007	CSI: Crime Scene Investigation	Mrs. Nivens	Episode: A La Cart
2009	Nip/Tuck	Surgeon	Episode: Budi Sabri
2010	Ghost Whisperer	Marion Alston	Episode: Blood Money
2019	Passenger List	Karen	Episode: Inoperative Operative

=== Stage ===
Year	Title	Role	Notes
1976	The Robber Bridegroom	Queenie Brenner	Biltmore Theatre, Broadway
1977	I Love My Wife	Cleo (Standby)/Monica (Standby)	Ethel Barrymore Theatre, Broadway
1982	Little Me	Baby Belle	Eugene O'Neill Theatre, Broadway
1982	Play Me a Country Song	Ellen	Virginia Theatre, Broadway
1983	Blue Plate Special	Connie Sue Day	Manhattan Theatre Club, Off-Broadway
1984	A... My Name Is Alice	Performer	American Place Theater, Off-Broadway
1985	Merrily We Roll Along	Gussie	La Jolla Playhouse
1986	Coastal Disturbances	Faith Bigelow	Second Stage Theater, Off-Broadway
1987	The Knife	Roxanne/Nurse	The Public Theater, Off-Broadway
1987	Into the Woods	Baker's Wife (Replacement)	Martin Beck Theatre, Broadway
1990	Can-Can	La Mome Pistache	Artpark Theater
1991	The Most Happy Fella	Rosabella	Doolittle Theatre
1991	Man of La Mancha	Aldonza / Dulcinea	Artpark Theater
1997	Damn Yankees	Mr. Applegate	Sacramento Music Circus
1997	Joseph and the Amazing Technicolor Dreamcoat	Nararator	The Muny
1998	The Sound of Music	Maria Rainer	The Theater League
1998	Footloose	Vi Moore (Replacement)	Richard Rogers Theatre, Broadway
2001	Into the Woods	Baker's Wife (Replacement)	Theatre Under the Stars (Houston)
2001	The Spitfire Grill	Effy Krayneck	Playwrights Horizons, Off-Broadway
2004	Life x 3	Inez	The Repertory Theatre of St. Louis
2005	Into the Woods	Baker's Wife (Replacement)	Civic Light Opera of South Bay Cities
2005	The Musical of Musicals (The Musical!)	Performer	The Colony Theatre Company
2007	Stage Struck	Anne	The Colony Theatre Company
2007	The Pirates of Penzance or The Slave of Duty	Ruth	Musical Theater West
2008	Sweeney Todd: The Demon Barber of Fleet Street	Mrs. Lovett	Broadway Sacramento
2009	Meet Me In St. Louis	Mrs. Anna Smith	Musical Theater West
2009	Putting It Together	Performer	South Coast Repertory
2010	Nightmare Alley	Zeena/Dr. Lilith Ritter	Geffen Playhouse
2011	The Light in the Piazza	Margaret Johnson	Civic Light Opera of South Bay Cities
2013	Hands on a Hardbody	Virginia Drew	Brooks Atkinson Theatre, Broadway
2015	My Fair Lady	Mrs. Higgins	Musical Theater West
2016	Cabaret	Fraulein Schneider	US Tour
2018	Three Tall Women	B (Standby)	John Golden Theatre, Broadway
2026	Liberation	Margie	US Tour
