= Joe Adler =

American actor

- Occupation: Actor
- Years active: 2010–present
- Family: Jerry Adler (grandfather); Laura Adler (aunt)

Joe Adler is an American actor. He is best known for playing the role of Zart in The Maze Runner and Jason Wylie in The Mentalist. He also was on Grey's Anatomy as Dr. Isaac Cross

== Filmography ==
=== Films ===
Year	Title	Role	Notes
2011	Prom	Rolo	
2013	The Day I Finally Decided		
2014	The Maze Runner	Zart	
2018	Kill Game	Nathan Nesbitt	
2020	The Bloodhound	Jean Paul Luret	
2022	Tankhouse	Yorick	
2022	The Greatest Beer Run Ever	Red	
2023	Americana	Fun Dave	

=== Television ===
Year	Title	Role	Notes
2010	Detroit 1-8-7	Cliff Rouse	Episode: "Déjà Vu/All In"
2010	NCIS	Matthew Gray	Episode: "False Witness"
2011	Field of Vision	Cory Kimble	TV movie
2012	Bones	Junior Babcock	Episode: "The Family in the Feud"
2012	Modern Family	Aidan Schwartz	Episode: "Arrested"
2012	CSI: Crime Scene Investigation	Jeremy Douglass	Episode: "Torch Song"
2012–2014	Shameless	Colin Milkovich	3 episodes
2013	Workaholics	High School Jerk	Episode: "Fourth and Inches"
2013–2015	The Mentalist	Jason Wylie	26 episodes
2015	Criminal Minds	Danny Lee Stokes	Episode: "Protection"
2015–2017	Grey's Anatomy	Dr. Isaac Cross	18 episodes
2016	Chicago P.D.	Gerald Dougherty	Episode: "She's Got Us"
2017	Twin Peaks	Roger	3 episodes
2017–2018	Damnation	DL Sullivan	10 episodes
2018	The Assassination of Gianni Versace: American Crime Story	Jerome Gentes	Episode: "The Man Who Would Be Vogue"
2019	The Good Doctor	Larry Childs	Episode: "Risk and Reward"
2020	The Rookie	Dan Marcie	Episode: "True Crime"
2021	CSI: Vegas	Ron King	Episode: "Under the Skin"
