= Beau Wirick =

American actor (born 1986)

- Born: April 30, 1986 (age 40); Orange, California, U.S.
- Occupations: Actor, producer
- Years active: 2001–present
- Known for: Raising Dad; The Middle
- Spouse: Daniela Bobadilla (m. 2018)

Beau Wirick (/ˈwaɪrɪk/ WYE-rik, born April 30, 1986) is an American actor best known for playing Sean Donahue on the ABC sitcom The Middle.

== Career ==
Wirick has appeared in roles on 7th Heaven, Arrested Development, NCIS, The Office, Drake & Josh and Jack & Bobby. In 2004, he portrayed Julian Crane in a flashback sequence on the daytime drama Passions.

== Personal life ==
In 2018, Wirick married his The Middle costar Daniela Bobadilla.

== Filmography ==
=== Film ===
Year	Title	Role	Notes
2006	Christopher Brennan Saves the World	Brett	Short film
2024	Unsung Hero	Matt	

=== Television ===
Year	Title	Role	Notes
2001–2002	Raising Dad	Evan	Recurring role; 17 episodes
2003	The Bernie Mac Show	Craig	Episode: "Raging Election"
2004	7th Heaven	Ed	2 episodes
2004	Jack & Bobby	Teammate	Episode: "The Teammate"
2005	Arrested Development	College Kid #3	Episode: "Spring Breakout"
2005	The Office	Frat Guy	Episode: "The Dundies"
2005	Drake & Josh	Tank	Episode: "Girl Power"
2009–2018	The Middle	Sean Donahue	Recurring role (61 episodes)
2010	Greek	Singing Omega Chi	Episode: "Take Me Out"
2014	NCIS	Navy Lt. Joseph Hagen	Episode: "Twenty Klicks"
2016	The People v. O. J. Simpson: American Crime Story	Allan Park	Episode: "From the Ashes of Tragedy"
2023	The Happy Camper	Jordan Atwood	Television film

=== Web ===
Year	Title	Role	Notes
2013–2014	The Walking Tedd	Ryan	Main role
