= Richard Bekins =

American actor

- Born: July 17, 1954 (age 72); Los Angeles County, California
- Occupations: Film and television actor

Richard Bekins (born July 17, 1954) is an American actor in theater, film, and television.

One of his earliest roles was as Jamie Frame in the daytime soap opera Another World (1979–1983).

He has made numerous guest appearances on television series such as on CBS's Bull, Person of Interest, Elementary, Madam Secretary and The Good Wife. On NBC, he has appeared in Law & Order, Law & Order: Criminal Intent, Law & Order: Special Victims Unit, and The Blacklist. Other television appearances include Mad Men, Daredevil, Madoff, The Path, Designated Survivor, Boardwalk Empire, Mr. Robot, and Younger. On ABC, he appeared as the President in the pilot episode of the television series Designated Survivor in September 2016.

On film, he has been seen in Brother to Brother (2004), The Only Living Boy in New York, Young Adult, Limitless, Julie & Julia, and United 93.

Bekins has appeared on Broadway in Love! Valour! Compassion, Tartuffe : Born Again, and Happy New Year.

Off Broadway he has been seen in productions such as Somewhere Fun, Too Much Sun, The Chaos Theories, The Normal Heart, Birdy, and Patient A.

== Filmography ==
=== Film ===
Year	Title	Role	Notes
2022	Armageddon Time	Headmaster Fitzroy	
2020	Vampires vs. the Bronx	Markus	
2018	Unintended	Ron	
2017	The Only Living Boy in New York	Prominent New Yorker	
2015	This Summer Feeling	Peter	French-German drama film
2014	How We Got Away with It	Walter	
2012	Nor'easter	Richard Green	
2011	Young Adult	David Gary	
2011	The Bleeding House	Matt	
2011	Arthur	Chancellor	Remake of the 1981 film
2011	Limitless	Hank Atwood	
2009	Julie & Julia	Houghton Mifflin Executive	
2009	The Northern Kingdom	David	
2009	Split Ends	Bernie Depper	
2008	Favorite Son	Coach William Huston	
2006	Spectropia	William	
2006	United 93	William Joseph Cashman	biographical drama-thriller film
2005	The Feast of the Goat	Manuel Alfonso	Film adaption of a book
2004	Messengers	Dr. Robert Chapel	
2004	Brother to Brother	Carl	
1991	Billy Bathgate	Carter - Drew's Racetrack Friend	
1986	George Washington II: The Forging of a Nation	Alexander Hamilton	(TV Movie), sequel to the 1984 miniseries George Washington
1982	Model Behavior	Richie	
1978	Killer's Delight	1st Deputy	

=== Television ===
Year	Title	Role	Notes
2024	The Girls on the Bus	Fergal P. Richards	3 Episodes
2023	The Other Two	Terrence	2 Episodes
2019	When They See Us	Judge Galligan	1 Episode
2018	The Sinner	Dr. Poole	2 Episodes,
2017	Bull	Robert Harney	1 Episode
2015-2017	Madam Secretary	Senator Raymond Caruthers	2 Episodes
2016	Designated Survivor	President Robert Richmond	1 Episode, Pilot
2016	The Path	Tom Kemp	1 Episode
2016	Limitless	Jean-Pierre Morneau	1 Episode
2016	Younger	Ethan	1 Episode
2016	Madoff	Jeremy Billings	4 Episodes
2015	Mr. Robot	James Plouffe	1 Episode
2015	Daredevil	Parish Landman	2 Episodes
2014	Boardwalk Empire	Theodore Rollins	2 Episodes
2013	The Blacklist	Gold Club Member	1 Episode
2013	Mad Men	William	1 Episode
2013	Zero Hour	Gaunt Man	1 Episode
2013	Elementary	Harold Dresden	1 Episode
2012	Person of Interest	Hanna's Father	1 Episode
2012	Blue Bloods	Scott Gibson	1 Episode
2012	The Good Wife	Dr. Rubich	1 Episode
2011	Law & Order: Criminal Intent	Mr. Gaffney	Episode: "To the Boy in the Blue Knit Cap"
2011	White Collar	Felix	1 Episode
2010	Rescue Me	Dr. Praskin	2 Episodes
1995-2010	Law & Order	Roger Weil (2010)/ Basketball Commissioner (2005)/ Mr. Landon (2002)/ Councilman Richard Durban (1995)	4 Episodes
2009	Fringe	Isaac Winters	1 Episode
2009	Damages	Donal Betancourt	1 Episode
2008	Army Wives	Alfred	1 Episode
2008	Canterbury's Law	Alden Mullen	1 Episode
2004	One Life to Live	Dr. William Long	1 Episode
2003	Law & Order: Special Victims Unit	Earl Briggs	1 Episode
1993	As the World Turns	Michael Alcott	1 Episode
1979-1983	Another World	Jamie Frame	Series regular
1978	One Day at a Time	Carl	1 Episode
1977	Maude	Jerry Carlisle	1 Episode
