= Jerry Adler =

American actor and director (1929–2025)

- Adler in 2016
- Born: Jerome Elliott Adler; February 4, 1929; Brooklyn, New York City, U.S.
- Died: August 23, 2025 (aged 96); Manhattan, New York City, U.S.
- Education: Syracuse University
- Occupations: Actor; director; producer
- Years active: 1950–2019
- Spouse(s): Dolores Parker (m. 1950; div. 1974) Cathy Rice (m. 1978, divorced) Joan Laxman (m. 1994)
- Children: 4; including Laura
- Relatives: Jacob Pavlovich Adler (great‑uncle); Stella Adler (cousin); Luther Adler (cousin); Joe Adler (grandson)

Jerome Elliott Adler (February 4, 1929 – August 23, 2025) was an American actor, theatrical producer, and director. He was known for his films Manhattan Murder Mystery, The Public Eye, In Her Shoes, and Prime, and for his television work as Herman "Hesh" Rabkin on The Sopranos, Howard Lyman on The Good Wife and The Good Fight, building maintenance man Mr. Wicker on Mad About You, Bob Saget's father Sam Stewart on Raising Dad, Fire Chief Sidney Feinberg on Rescue Me, Moshe Pfefferman on Transparent, Saul Horowitz on Broad City, and Hillston on Living with Yourself with Paul Rudd.

== Early life ==
Jerome Elliott Adler was born in Brooklyn, New York City, on February 4, 1929, to Jewish parents Philip Adler (1905–1990) and Pauline "Polly" Goldberg (1906–2000). His father was a theater manager for dozens of Broadway and touring shows from the 1930s to the 1960s. He was general manager of the Group Theatre collective in New York and managed productions for Herman Levin and Alexander H. Cohen. Adler's great-uncle was Yiddish theater actor Jacob Pavlovich Adler, whose children Stella and Luther Adler were his cousins. He was raised in a Yiddish-speaking, observant Jewish household. Adler attended Samuel J. Tilden High School where he was president of the Dramatic Club, and Syracuse University.

== Career ==
Influenced by his family, Adler began his theatre career as a stage manager in 1950, working on such productions as Of Thee I Sing and My Fair Lady before becoming a production supervisor for The Apple Tree, Black Comedy/White Lies, Dear World, Coco, 6 Rms Riv Vu, Annie, and I Remember Mama, among others. He made his directing debut with the 1974 Sammy Cahn revue Words and Music and also directed the 1976 revival of My Fair Lady, which garnered him a Drama Desk Award nomination, and the ill-fated 1981 musical The Little Prince and the Aviator. He also directed the 1976 play Checking Out. Other credits include Drat! The Cat!; a 1976 revival of Hellzapoppin starring Jerry Lewis; and Richard Rodgers' final musical, I Remember Mama. In addition to theater productions, he also worked on television.

Adler's first acting role was in 1991 in the television series Brooklyn Bridge. The following year, he appeared in the film The Public Eye. He began to receive several acting roles, including a role in the television series Northern Exposure as Alan Schulman, Joel Fleischman's old neighborhood rabbi seen in visions. David Chase, who worked as a screenwriter on the series, later created the drama series The Sopranos, in which he asked Adler to play Herman "Hesh" Rabkin, an associate of the DiMeo crime family. Adler played the role from 1999 to 2007, and is perhaps best known for it. He was also noted for his role as lawyer Howard Lyman on both The Good Wife and its spin-off series The Good Fight.

He also played Mr. Wicker on Mad About You, Bob Saget's character's father Sam Stewart on Raising Dad, and Lt. Al Teischler on Hudson Street. In addition, Adler appeared in an episode of The West Wing as Toby Ziegler's father, Jules Ziegler. Adler also appeared as the new chief Sidney Feinberg in the fourth season of FX's firefighter drama Rescue Me. He guest-starred as Eddie's father Al in season three and season four of 'Til Death. From 2017 to 2019, Adler played Moshe Pfefferman, the father of Jeffrey Tambor's character, on the Amazon series Transparent. In 2019, he portrayed Saul Horowitz on Broad City and Hillston on Living with Yourself with Paul Rudd.

His film screen credits include Manhattan Murder Mystery, In Her Shoes and Prime. In 2014, he starred as Joseph Mendelsohn in A Most Violent Year opposite Jessica Chastain and Oscar Isaac.

He first appeared on stage in 2000. He also acted in Larry David's Broadway play Fish in the Dark.

In 2024, Adler published a memoir titled Too Funny for Words: Backstage Tales from Broadway, Television and the Movies.

== Death ==
Adler died at his home in Manhattan, New York City, on August 23, 2025, at the age of 96.

== Filmography ==
=== Film ===
Year	Title	Role	Notes
1992	The Public Eye	Arthur Nabler	
1993	Manhattan Murder Mystery	Paul House	
1995	For Better or Worse	Morton Makeshift	
1996	Getting Away with Murder	Judge	
1996	Larger than Life	Event Coordinator	
1997	Six Ways to Sunday	Louis Varga	
1999	30 Days	Rick Trainer	
2005	In Her Shoes	Lewis Feldman	
2005	Prime	Sam	
2006	Find Me Guilty	Rizzo	
2007	The Memory Thief	Mr. Zweig	
2008	Synecdoche, New York	Caden's father	
2014	The Angriest Man in Brooklyn	Cooper	
2014	A Most Violent Year	Joseph Mendelsohn	
2019	Fair Market Value	Victor Rosen	
2019	Driveways	Rodger	

=== Television ===
Year	Title	Role	Notes
1991	Brooklyn Bridge	Bert Mendel	Episode: "Old Fools"
1992	True Colors	Mr. Green	2 episodes
1992	Quantum Leap	Lenny Greenman	Episode: "It's a Wonderful Leap - May 10, 1958"
1993–1999, 2019	Mad About You	Sgt. Panino / Mr. Wicker	12 episodes
1993	The Odd Couple Together Again	Murray	TV movie
1994–1995	Northern Exposure	Rabbi Alan Schulman	3 episodes
1995	New York Undercover	Mr. Ross	Episode: "All in the Family"
1995	One Life to Live	Len Hanen	3 episodes
1995–1996	Hudson Street	Lt. Al Teischler	22 episodes
1996	Law & Order	Judge Nathan Marks	Episode: "I.D."
1996	Spin City	Police Commissioner	Episode: "Dog Day Afternoon"
1997–1998	Alright Already	Al Lerner	21 episodes
1999–2007	The Sopranos	Herman "Hesh" Rabkin	28 episodes
1999	LateLine	Judge Fischbein	Episode: "Protecting the Source"
1999	Tracey Takes On...	Murray	Episode: "Lies"
1999	Aftershock: Earthquake in New York	Burt Hornstein	2 episodes
2000	Wonderland	Perlman	Episode: "Spell Check"
2000	Bull	Max Decker	2 episodes
2001–2002	Raising Dad	Sam Stewart	22 episodes
2002	The West Wing	Jules Ziegler	Episode: "Holy Night"
2005	CSI: Miami	Cardinal Benedetti	Episode: "From the Grave"
2006	The War at Home	Jerry	Episode: "The West Palm Beach Story"
2007–2011	Rescue Me	Sidney Feinberg	34 episodes
2008–2009	'Til Death	Al Stark / Eddie's Father	3 episodes
2010	Detroit 1-8-7	Max Elkin	Episode: "Déjà Vu/All In"
2011	Curb Your Enthusiasm	Minyan Member #1	Episode: "Mister Softee"
2011–2016	The Good Wife	Howard Lyman	Recurring role; 30 episodes
2013	Remember Sunday	Sam	TV movie
2014	Mozart in the Jungle	Lazlo	2 episodes
2017–2018	The Good Fight	Howard Lyman	2 episodes
2017–2019	Transparent	Moshe Pfefferman	9 episodes
2019	Broad City	Saul Horowitz	Episode: "Lost and Found"
2019	Living with Yourself	Hillston	Episode: "Green Tea"
