= Two Birds (Awake) =

- Awake episode
- Episode no.: Season 1 Episode 12
- Directed by: Milan Cheylov
- Story by: Evan Katz
- Teleplay by: Howard Gordon; Davey Holmes
- Production code: 1ATR11
- Original air date: May 17, 2012
- Running time: 43 minutes

Guest appearances
- Kevin Weisman as Ed Hawkins; Laura Innes as Tricia Harper; Daniela Bobadilla as Emma

Episode chronology
← Previous "Say Hello to My Little Friend"	Next → "Turtles All the Way Down"

"Two Birds" is the twelfth episode of the American television police procedural fantasy drama Awake. The episode premiered on NBC on May 17, 2012. In the episode, Michael learns more about the truth of the accident. He tries to get evidence that Ed Hawkins (Kevin Weisman) tried to kill him, and finds out that Hawkins' commanding officer Carl Kessel (Mark Harelik) was also in on this setup.

The story and concept of the episode was written by Evan Katz, with teleplay by Howard Gordon and Davey Holmes. It was directed by Milan Cheylov. "Two Birds" was well received by critics, who praised its storylines. Commentators noted that the script was well written. Upon airing, "Two Birds" obtained 2.1 million viewers in the United States and a 0.7 rating in the 18–49 demographic, according to Nielsen ratings.

== Plot ==
The episode starts with Michael Britten (Jason Isaacs) trying to convince therapists Dr. Jonathan Lee (BD Wong) and Dr. Judith Evans (Cherry Jones) that Ed Hawkins (Kevin Weisman) tried to kill him. The therapists claim that he is imagining the plot to cope.

Later, Michael tells Rex he must stay with his Aunt Carol, as Michael is working on a case with a dangerous suspect. His partner, Bird, goes to his house, after trying to call him to make sure he is alright, but then looks in the garage and finds Michael's work on his accident and Detective Hawkins. Bird goes to Dr. Judith Evans, who reluctantly advises Bird to check on Michael. Michael goes to Ed Hawkins' house, shoots Hawkins in the leg, and asks him for evidence. Hawkins says heroin was taken from various evidence lockers and sent out for sale through Westfield Distribution, and further evidence is on his laptop. Hawkins tries to overpower Michael, forcing him to kill Hawkins, right before Bird enters the house. Michael takes Bird's gun and handcuffs him. Bird suggests that to get into Hawkins' laptop, they use a hacker they both worked with previously, right before he knocks out Michael, who wakes up in the red reality.

Michael tells his wife to stay somewhere safe, and then tells the red reality Bird to meet him in the park. He tells Bird what he found out in the green reality (where his son is alive and his wife is dead) regarding Hawkins, his accident and the encrypted file and convinces Bird to copy it from Hawkins' computer, though neither of them know Hawkins has been watching them. Hawkins meets immediately with Tricia Harper and Carl Kessel (revealed to be Bird and Hawkins' precinct chief in this reality) and Kessel says they will kill both Michael and Bird and make it look like Michael did it, given his recently unstable behavior. Captain Harper shows doubts and remorse at this idea, but agrees.

Still in the red reality (where his son is dead and his wife is alive), Michael visits the hacker suggested in the green reality. He gains Hawkins' password and unlocks the file. The files tell Michael that Hawkins and Kessel had a shipping container where they had been storing the heroin. Bird tells Michael that they will meet at his house, but when Michael gets there, Hawkins has killed Bird and tries to kill Michael. Hawkins, however, only manages to injure him. Hawkins calls in that Michael killed Bird and Captain Harper tells her precinct to use deadly force to bring Michael in, much to Detective Vega's surprise. Vega tries to tell Harper that, even deranged, Michael would never kill Bird, but Harper emotionally rebuts him, saying he is showing sympathy for a killer. This leaves Vega confused and suspicious. Michael manages to escape Hawkins, but passes out from his wound and wakes up back in the green reality.

He finds himself back in his car, handcuffed, but relieved to see that the green reality Bird is still alive. He gives Bird Hawkins' password ("tulip"), and the information regarding Kessel and the shipping container convinces Bird that something is wrong. He takes Michael to Harper still in cuffs but they both tell her what they have learned. Harper approves Bird's plan to send a team to the storage container but sends Michael to a cell, saying that if they do not find any evidence of his accusations, he'll go to jail for killing Hawkins.

== Production ==
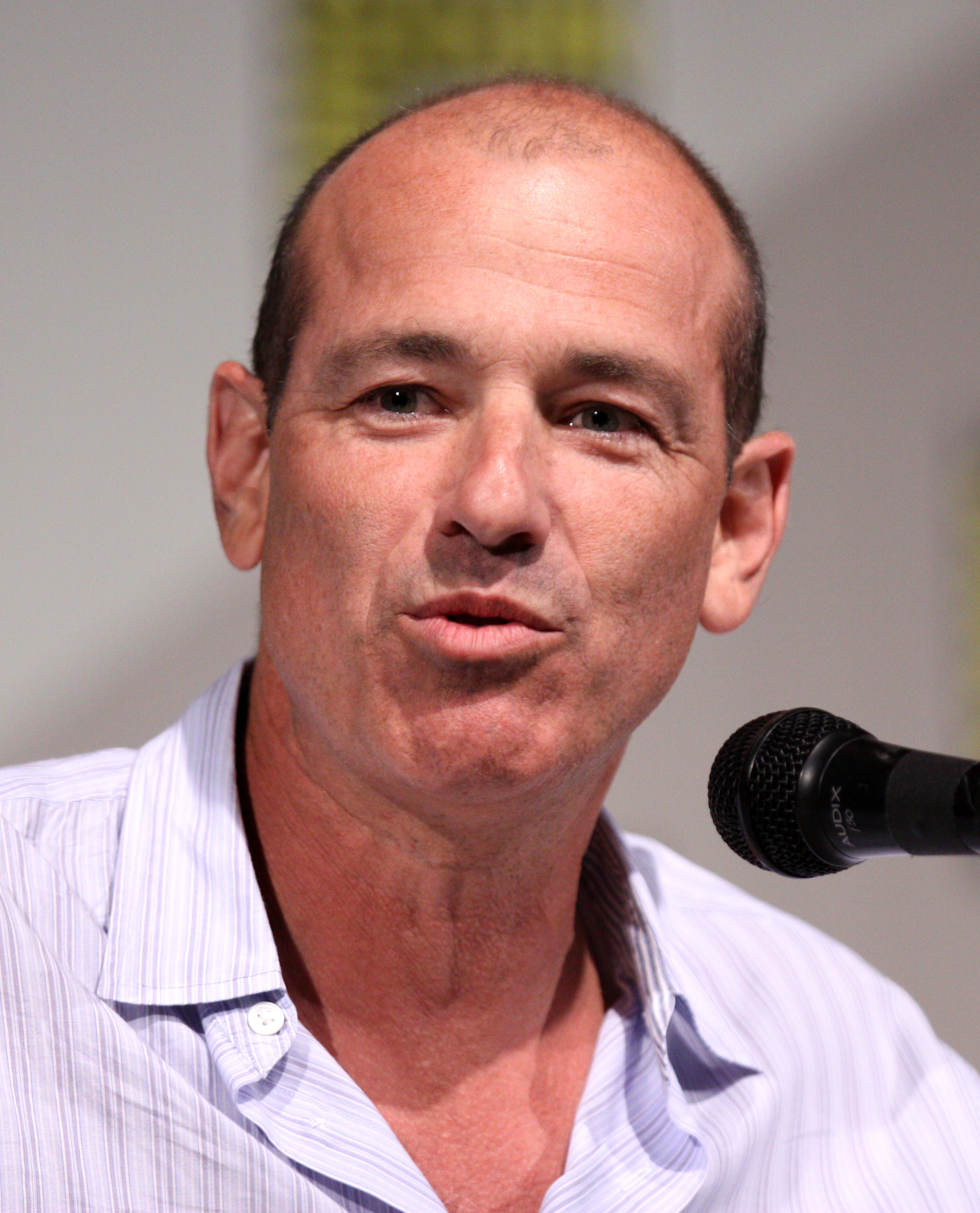
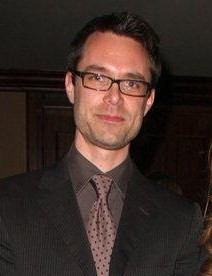
Howard Gordon (left) wrote the teleplay of the episode, along with Davey Holmes (right)

The story and concept of the episode was written by consulting producer Evan Katz, with teleplay by executive producer Howard Gordon and co-executive producer Davey Holmes; it was Katz's third writing credit, Gordon's fourth writing credit, and Holmes' second writing credit. It was directed by Milan Cheylov, his first directing credit for the series.

In January 2012, it was announced that Kevin Weisman would appear in multiple episodes of Awake. This is Weisman's second appearance on the series as Ed Hawkins. Other guest stars included Laura Innes as Tricia Harper and Daniela Bobadilla as Emma.

== Reception ==
=== Ratings ===
"Two Birds" was originally broadcast on May 17, 2012 in the United States on NBC between 10:00 p.m. and 11:00 p.m., and obtained 2.1 million viewers in the United States, slightly down from the previous episode. It acquired a 0.7 rating in the 18–49 demographic, according to Nielsen ratings, meaning that it was seen by 0.9% of all 18- to 49-year-olds.

=== Critical response ===
The episode was met with praise from most critics. IGN rated it 9 of 10 as "amazing", and wrote that "it really ramped up the intensity". Alan Sepinwall from HitFix complimented parts of the episode, notably the "excellent work from Jason Isaacs, Steve Harris and Laura Innes in both realities", despite claiming that they did not particularly care for the script. TV Fanatic rated it 4.6 out of 5, and noted that "Awake works so much better when there’s one unifying case". Screenrant praised the episode, claiming that there was "some fantastic editing and writing that allows two conversations between three people to appear as one cohesive interchange, basically setting up the remainder of the episode". ScreenCrush claimed that "a conspiracy that saw NBC running this great show off the road, or a simple unfortunate accident.". The Voice of TV graded the episode an "A−", despite claiming that it is annoying that he doesn't tell his family members about his new knowledge. The TV.com official blog claimed the episode was "impossible to sustain". The A.V. Club graded the episode "B+", claiming that it was "completely entertaining and engrossing", and that "it's just a slight tick down from last week's "Say Hello to My Little Friend", which was the best episode since Awake's pilot, and the most surreal since the hallucinations of "That's Not My Penguin."
