= Nick Sakai =

American actor and producer

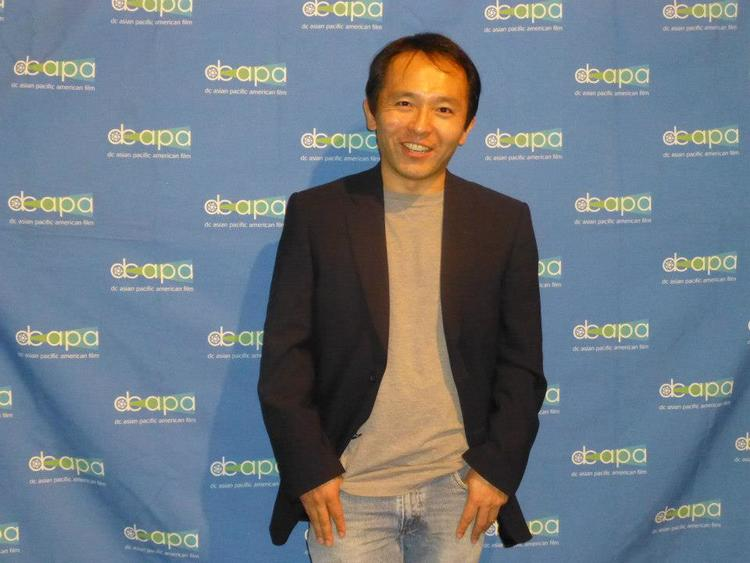
- Nick Sakai
- Born: Osaka, Japan
- Occupation(s): Actor, Producer

Nick Sakai is an American actor and producer. He has been seen in High Maintenance, The Affair, Orange Is The New Black, and other shows. He produced, directed and starred in his own short films, Ms Kiss and Three Minute Love Affair. His 2010 film 12, a parody of 24, became a YouTube sensation and was premiered at the 2010 Comic-Con. He also associate produced (and acted in) The Professor starring Betsy Brandt and Rick Peters. The film won the Best Action/Adventure short at the 2014 San Diego Comic-Con.

He studied with Suzanne Shepherd (Requiem for a Dream, The Sopranos), Maggie Flanigan at William Esper Studio, James Price, Loyd Williamson and Larry Moss.

On stage, he appeared in Off Broadway production of "The Shanghai Gesture", produced by Mirror Repertory Company, directed by Robert Kalfin, starring Tina Chen and Larry Pine plus many others in New York City.

== Filmography ==
- Guiding Light (1997) as a Delivery worker
- As the World Turns (1999) as a Vendor in the Park
- The Accountant (2001) as Vanessa's Driver
- Law & Order: Criminal Intent (2004) as Detective Tanaka
- Third Watch (2004) as an NYPD anti-crime agent
- Telling Tales (2005) as Tom Lee
- Three Minute Love Affair (2006) as Charles Ohara
- College Road Trip (2008) as Singer
- The Taking of Pelham 123 (2009) as Paramedic
- Shanghai (2009) as ADR voice artist
- 12 (2010) as Goro (premiered at 2010 Comic-Con)
- The Raft (2011) as Japanese Sailor #1
- Couch (2011) as Huang Loi
- The Professor (2013) as Viewer #3 (also served as Associate Producer)
- Orange Is The New Black (2016, Season 4) as Happy Clappy Waiter #3
- The Affair (2016, Season 3) as Anesthesiologist
- Docket 32357 (2017, Season 2) as Father Morrison
- High Maintenance (2018, Season 2) as Actor
- Big Dogs (2020) as Street Preacher
- Bashira (film) (2021) as Driver
- Heather (2022?) as Officer Dan
