= Bashira =

2021 American horror film

- Film poster
- Directed by: Nickson Fong
- Produced by: Steve Krone; Chris Bongirne; David Gendron; Ali Jazayeri; Theodore Godwin; James Blackburn
- Starring: Liam Aiken; Mitzi Akaha; Kiki Sukezane; Emma Sofia; Brandon Gill; Akiko Shima
- Music by: Kenji Ichiyanagi
- Production companies: Bashira; Egg Story Studios; Robotic Vision
- Release date: October 24, 2021 (Cine-Excess)
- Running time: 124 minutes
- Country: United States
- Languages: English; Japanese

Bashira is a 2021 American horror film directed by Nickson Fong based on a Japanese legend.

== Premise ==
After suffering a series of nightmares with bizarre and mysterious appearances, Andy (Liam Aiken), an electronic musician, and Lela (Mitzi Akaha), an aspiring singer, end up embarking on parallel journeys in search of answers.

== Cast ==
- Liam Aiken - Andy Monrovia
- Mitzi Akaha - Lela Cavanaugh
- Kiki Sukezane - Maya Shitara
- Emma Caymares - Aliss Lopez
- Brandon Gill - Chris Marshall
- Akiko Shima - Yone Kume
- Eddy Toru Ohno - Kazuo Kariya
- Colin Cunningham - John Cavanaugh
- Sayuri Oyamada - Yoko Cavanaugh
- Akiko Fujiwara - Young Yoko Cavanaugh
- Toru Uchikado - Michihisa Kariya
- Takuma Anzai - Kenji Okazaki
- Sono Hideko - Setsuko Shitara
- Josie DiVincenzo - Sharon Monrovia
- Alana de Freitas - Dani Cavanaugh
- Nick Sakai - Limousine Driver

== Production ==
In early 2014, Nickson Fong and Eko Nonoyama began developing the screenplay, with Eko's original Japanese screenplay being completed in 2017. Later in 2017, Los Angeles filmmaker Todd Ocvirk created an adapted version of the screenplay in english. On the 2018 production set, producer Steve Krone said, "It's not a gory of violent horror film. I would describe it as more of a sort of supernatural kind of ghost story kind of horror film."

Principal photography began in Buffalo, New York in July 2018, and was initially scheduled to be released in 2019, which it did not. Some of the locations include WNED-TV studio, Statler City, Aurora, Little Rock City and Shinshiro, Japan.

== Release ==
It was released at the Cine-Excess 2021.

== Reception ==
On Dread Central, Sharai Bohannon rated it 3/5 stars writing in the review summary that "this movie is probably a good time for people who are into live-action films, anime, and musicals. The story is a little hard to follow, and it does at times feel like more of a showcase for visual effects than a movie."

== Soundtrack ==
On November 6, 2021, the main theme song for Bashira was released on their official YouTube channel. The track titled "Can You Hear Me?" a music by Fumitake Igarashi & David Sisko performed by Katharine L. Feeley and Mark Matters.

- "Can You Hear Me?" (Katharine L. Feeley and Mark Matters)
- "Ocean of Embers" (featuring Mod Sun)
- "Bashira Cursed Song" (Punk Metak Version) (feat. Septimo Cain)

== Awards ==
- 2021 TerrorMolins
  - Videodrome
  - Best Original Soundtrack (Can Your Hear Me?)

== See also ==
- List of horror films of 2021
