= Nickson Fong =

Singaporean computer graphics artist

- Fong in 2013
- Born: Nickson Fong; November 1, 1969 (age 56); Singapore
- Other name: "Egg"
- Citizenship: Singaporean
- Education: Saint Andrew's Secondary School; Nanyang Academy of Fine Arts; Savannah College of Art and Design
- Occupations: Filmmaker, Director, VFX Supervisor
- Years active: 1993–present
- Employers: DreamWorks Animation; Digimax; Sony Imageworks; Centropolis (CFX) ESC Entertainment (The Matrix movie VFX production company)
- Known for: First Singaporean to receive an Academy Award
- Notable work: "Pose Space Deformation" animation technique
- Awards: 1 Academy Award

Nickson Fong (born 1969) is a Singaporean computer graphics artist and the first Singaporean to receive an Academy Award.

== Early life ==
Sent by his father for art lessons since three, Fong studied at the Savannah College of Art and Design after getting a diploma at the Nanyang Academy of Fine Arts; he graduated from the college in 1994. Prior to him obtaining his master's degree in computer art at Savannah, Fong studied at Saint Andrew's Secondary School. There, he was a "school dropout who flunked his exams every year." His school's principal, the late Mr. Harry Tan Ho Swee, was quoted as telling Fong's mother:

Your son is useless. If he can find a job in McDonald's earning $1 an hour, please find him a job.

== Career ==
=== Early career in Japan ===
Fong's first animation job was at Future Pirates in 1993, a Japanese game developer based in Tokyo, where he worked in the computer graphics department for a year.

=== Early short films ===
Fong's early films are heavily influenced by HR Giger and Hayao Miyazaki. In early 90s Nickson directed and produced "Screamscape" a CGI animated short film in collaboration with Dr. Seah Hock Soon (Professor School of Computer Engineering Nanyang Technological University) Special Thanks to Nanyang Technological University, Singapore. In 1994, Fong started working on his graduation project "Dreamaker" a CGI animated Short at Savannah College of Art and Design it was accepted at the Siggraph'96 Electronic Theater - Nickson Fong was the first student at Savannah College of Art Design to have an animated short film accepted at the Siggraph'96 Electronic Theater competing with professional in the animation industry.

=== Hollywood career ===
An animated short film by Fong caught the attention of DreamWorks Animation when it was showcased at SIGGRAPH 1996, an annual animation conference, and shortly after, he landed a job at DreamWorks. From then on, he was based in Los Angeles, California.

Now based in Taipei, Republic of China, and Los Angeles. Fong is known for co-inventing and publishing, along with two others, in 2000, an animating technique known as the "Pose Space Deformation", which makes animated characters' features more lifelike. This algorithm has been used widely in films, such as Spider-Man (2002) and Avatar (2009). and many other Hollywood films. Fong was awarded with an Academy Award for Scientific and Technical Awards on February 9, 2013 at the Academy of Sci-Tech Awards presentation. Among many other films, Fong worked as Senior Technical Director for The Matrix Reloaded (2003), as well as Starship Troopers (1997), Stuart Little (1999) and Shrek (2001) returned to Singapore and founded production company Egg Story Creative Production in 2004; Fong decided to focus on content development and pre-production in 2009 and he established another production company, Egg Story Studios and Re'al Sandbox.

Fong also founded Egg Story Digital Arts Academy in July 2007; it was sold in 2010 at its peak of 250 students and rebranded to ArtFusion Media. One of Fong's ongoing projects is Kung Fu Gecko (working title). An action romantic comedy set a millennium ago in China, it had a budget of roughly US$20/30 million; a trailer being released in 2005,.

In 2018, he began directing the horror movie Bashira, which was released on 2021.

=== Current works ===
Nickson has partnered with TectonicTales and has revived Kung Fu Gecko. Kung Fu Gecko is in works to be one of the first Hollywood animations to be released as an NFT. Fong is opening up the creative aspects; story telling, art and animation as a part of the NFT's utility.

== Recognition and personal life ==
Fong has received the 2003 "Outstanding Alumni" award from the Savannah College of Arts and Design.

At the National Day Rally 2004, Prime Minister Lee Hsien Loong praised Fong for his efforts.

He has said that filmmaker Ray Harryhausen influenced him and ignited his interest in animation.

Notable awards include:

- Feb 9, 2013 - Academy Award for Technical Achievement, together with J.P. Lewis and Matt Cordner for the invention and publication of the "Pose Space Deformation" technique.
- Nov 13, 2021 - “Bashira” received the distinguished Golden Stake Award ahead of its screening at North America’s Shockfest Film Festival.
- Nov 16, 2021 - “Bashira” Best Picture Winner At Bleedingham Horror Film Festival.
- Nov 30, 2021- “Bashira” won Best Original Soundtrack at the Terror Molins International Film Festival.
- Dec 11, 2021 - “Bashira” nominated for Best Feature at North America’s Shockfest Film Festival.
- Dec 24, 2021 - “Bashira” won Best Visual Effects Award At Buenos Aires Rojo Sangre Horror Film Festival
