= Daniela Bobadilla =

Canadian actress (born 1993)

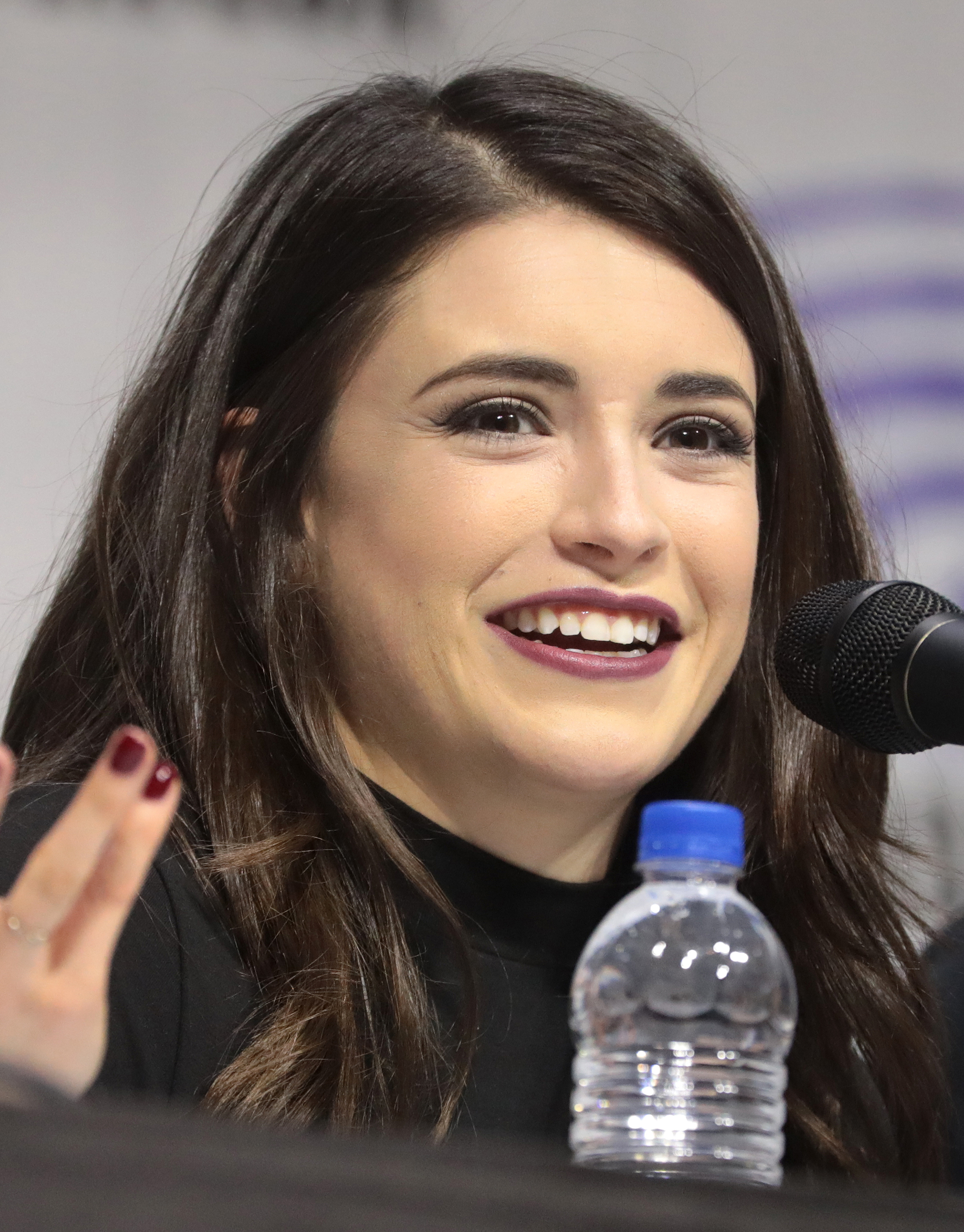
- Bobadilla at the 2019 WonderCon
- Born: April 4, 1993 (age 33); Mexico City, Mexico
- Occupation: Actress
- Years active: 2008–present
- Spouse: Beau Wirick (m. 2018)

Daniela Bobadilla (born April 4, 1993) is a Mexican-born Canadian actress. She is best known for playing Sam Goodson in the FX series Anger Management. She has also appeared in other film and television roles, such as Mr. Troop Mom, the NBC drama Awake, the ABC series The Middle, and the Lifetime original movies Lies in Plain Sight, The Cheating Pact and Perfect High.

== Early life ==
Bobadilla was born in Mexico City to parents Carlos and Haydee. She is of Mexican and Spanish descent. Her family relocated to North Vancouver, British Columbia and then to nearby Coquitlam. She showed an aptitude for performing at an early age, and as well as an affinity for figure skating. While attending Summit Middle School, she took up acting with the school's theater department, and then with the Theatrix Youththeatre Society. She went on to perform in numerous productions including Fiddler on the Roof, High School Musical and The Wizard of Oz. She began auditioning for film and television roles while attending Heritage Woods Secondary School.

== Career ==
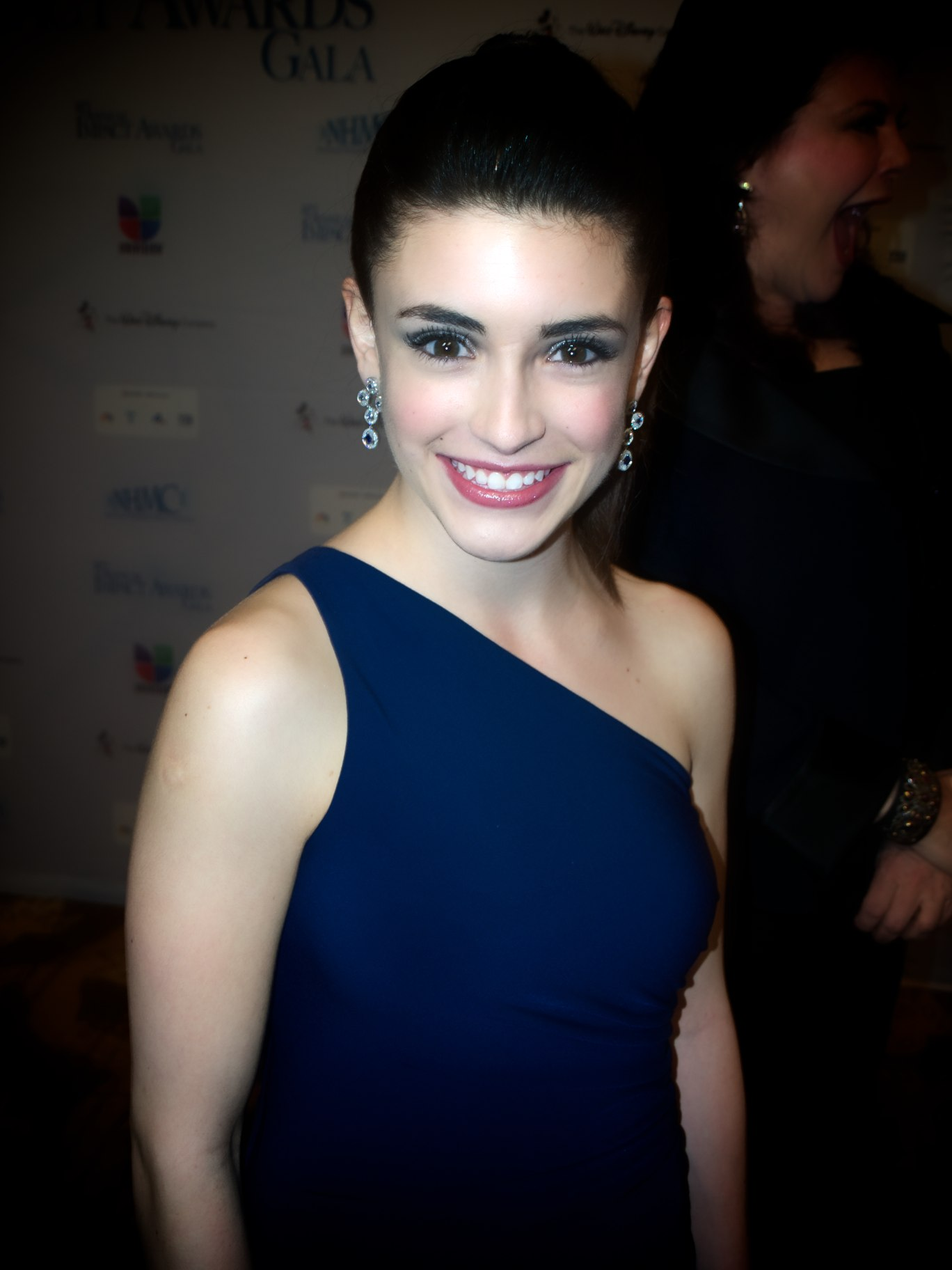
Bobadilla in 2012

In 2008, Bobadilla won the title of Port Moody Idol. Shortly thereafter, she appeared in guest roles on two Canadian-produced series for The CW, Smallville and Supernatural, later relocating with her family to Los Angeles. She appeared in her first American leading role in the Lifetime film Lies in Plain Sight, in which she portrayed a 13-year-old blind adolescent. She later appeared on an episode of Lie to Me, as well as the Hallmark Channel's Oliver's Ghost.

In 2012, she was cast as Sam Goodson, the 13-year-old, obsessive-compulsive daughter of Charlie Sheen's character on the FX series Anger Management. The role became Bobadilla's most extensive, when the series was picked up for a continuous, syndicated run of 100 episodes, with Sam appearing in 55.

In 2013, she played the main character, Heather, in the Lifetime film The Cheating Pact. In 2015, Bobadilla was cast as a primary character in another Lifetime film, Perfect High. Beginning in the seventh season of the ABC comedy series The Middle, Bobadilla played the recurring role of Lexie Brooks, Sue Heck's college roommate and later Axl’s girlfriend.

== Personal life ==
In 2018, Bobadilla married her The Middle costar Beau Wirick.

== Filmography ==
=== Film ===
Year	Title	Role	Notes
2012	Tomorrow Maybe	Jessica	Short film
2012	Rosita Lopez for President	Rosita Lopez	Short film
2015	National Signing Day	Mary Beth	
2015	Texas Heart	Alison	
2015	The Highway is for Gamblers	Rosa	
2016	Odious	Gina	
2016	Face to Face	Madison Daniels	Direct-to-video film
2017	Ferdinand	Tall Nun	Voice
2019	Justice League vs. the Fatal Five	Miss Martian	Voice
2019	Curious George: Royal Monkey	Princess Isabel	Voice

=== Television ===
Year	Title	Role	Notes
2009	Smallville	Fanatic Teenager	Episode: "Infamous"
2009	Mr. Troop Mom	Naomi Serrano	Television film
2010	Supernatural	Sydney Frankle	Episode: "Swap Meat"
2010	Lie to Me	Deedee Fletcher	Episode: "The Royal We"
2010	Lies in Plain Sight	Young Sofia	Television film
2011	Oliver's Ghost	Jenny McCaffrey	Television film
2012	Desperate Housewives	Marisa Sanchez	2 episodes
2012	Awake	Emma	Recurring role, 6 episodes
2012–2014	Anger Management	Sam Goodson	Main role, 55 episodes
2012	Emily Owens, M.D.	Payson Sorriano	Episode: "Emily and... the Outbreak"
2013	Bucket & Skinner's Epic Adventures	Danielle Smith	Episode: "Epic Copycat"
2013	Big Time Rush	Dara Laramie	Episode: "Big Time Cameo"
2013	The Cheating Pact	Heather Marshall	Television film
2014	The Night Shift	Nina	Episode: "Blood Brothers"
2015	Mothers of the Bride	Jenna Wolf	Television film
2015	Perfect High	Riley Taft	Television film
2016–2018	The Middle	Lexie Brooks	Recurring role (seasons 7–9)
2017	The Rachels	Roxie	Television film
2019, 2021	Young Justice	Mist / Andie Murphy	Voice, 2 episodes
2023	The Happy Camper	Dillon Michaels	Television film
