= List of horror films of 2023 =

This is a list of horror films that were released in 2023. This list includes films that are classified as horror as well as other subgenres. They are listed in alphabetical order.

== Highest-grossing horror films of 2023 ==
Highest-grossing horror films of 2023
Rank	Title	Distributor	Worldwide gross
1	Five Nights at Freddy's	Universal Pictures	$297.1 million
2	The Nun II	Warner Bros. Pictures	$269.5 million
3	Insidious: The Red Door	Sony Pictures Releasing	$189.1 million
4	Scream VI	Paramount Pictures	$169.1 million
5	Evil Dead Rise	Warner Bros. Pictures	$147 million
6	The Exorcist: Believer	Universal Pictures	$137 million
7	Saw X	Lionsgate Films	$125.3 million
8	Haunted Mansion	Walt Disney Studios Motion Pictures	$117.5 million
9	Godzilla Minus One	Toho	$113.6 million
10	Cocaine Bear	Universal Pictures	$90 million

== 2023 horror films ==
Horror films released in 2023
Title	Director	Cast	Country	Subgenre	Ref.
65	Scott Beck, Bryan Woods	Adam Driver, Ariana Greenblatt	United States	Science Fiction Thriller	
1920: Horrors of the Heart	Krishna Bhatt	Avika Gor, Rahul Dev, Randheer Rai	India	Horror	
Abigail	Melissa Vitello	Ava Cantrell, Tren Reed-Brown, Hermione Lynch, Gene Farber, Karimah Westbrook	United States	Slasher horror thriller	
Abruptio	Evan Marlowe	James Marsters, Christopher McDonald, Hana Mae Lee, Robert Englund, Jordan Peele, Sid Haig	United States	Puppet horror	
Adalynn	Jacob Byrd	Sydney Carvill, Wade Baker, Janet Carter, Rob Shuster, Suzana Norberg	United States	Horror drama	
All Fun and Games	Ari Costa, Eren Celeboglu	Asa Butterfield, Natalia Dyer, Benjamin Evan Ainsworth, Laurel Marsden, Annabeth Gish	United States	Horror Thriller	
All You Need is Blood	Bucky Le Boeuf	Logan Riley Bruner, Mena Suvari, Eddie Griffin, Emma Chasse, Neel Sethi, Tom O'Keefe	United States	Horror Comedy	
Ang Mga Kaibigan ni Mama Susan	Chito S. Roño	Joshua Garcia, Angie Ferro	Philippines	Horror Thriller	
Asvins	Tarun Teja	Vasanth Ravi, Vimala Raman	India	Psychological horror	
Bakemono	Doug Roos	Takashi Irie, Dominic Early, Marilyn Kawakami, Yukina Takase	Japan	Monster horror	
Batman: The Doom That Came to Gotham	Christopher Berkeley, Sam Liu	David Giuntoli, Tati Gabrielle, Christopher Gorham	United States	Animated Superhero Crime Horror	
Bayi Ajaib	Rako Prijanto	Vino G. Bastian, Adipati Dolken, Desy Ratnasari, T. Rifnu Wikana	Indonesia	Supernatural horror	
Beau Is Afraid	Ari Aster	Joaquin Phoenix, Nathan Lane, Patti LuPone, Amy Ryan, Kylie Rogers, Parker Posey, Stephen McKinley Henderson, Hayley Squires, Michael Gandolfini, Zoe Lister-Jones, Richard Kind	United States	Surrealist comedy horror	
The Bell Keeper	Colton Tran	Randy Couture, Kathleen Kenny, Reid Miller, Mike Manning, Cathy Marks, Bonnie Aarons	United States	Horror Slasher	
Betrayal	Rodger Griffiths	James Harkness, Brian Vernel, Daniel Portman, Paul Higgins, Calum Ross, Joanne Thomson, Anita Vettesse	United Kingdom	psychological horror, thriller, survival film	
Big Shark	Tommy Wiseau	Tommy Wiseau, Isaiah LaBorde, Mark Valeriano	United States	Horror drama	
Bird Box Barcelona	Álex Pastor, David Pastor	Mario Casas, Georgina Campbell, Diego Calva, Lola Dueñas, Patrick Criado, Michelle Jenner, Leonardo Sbaraglia	Spain	Post-apocalyptic horror	
Birth/Rebirth	Laura Moss	Marin Ireland, Judy Reyes, A.J. Lister, Breeda Wool, LaChanze	United States	Psychological horror	
Black Mold	John Pata	Agnes Albright, Andrew Bailes, Jeremy Holm, Caito Aase	United States	Psychological thriller horror	
Blue Hour: The Disappearance of Nick Brandreth	Dan Bowhers	Morgan DeTogne, Michael Kowalski, Mike Headford, Nick Brandreth, Josh Olkowski	United States	Found footage horror	
Brooklyn 45	Ted Geoghegan	Anne Ramsay, Larry Fessenden, Ezra Buzzington, Kristina Klebe	United States	Supernatural thriller horror	
Circle Line	JD Chua	Jesseca Liu, Peter Yu, Andie Chen, Patrick Pei-hsu Lee, Alan Tan, Johnny Ng, Nathaniel Ng, Ashley Seow	Singapore	Monster horror	
Clock	Alexis Jacknow	Dianna Agron, Jay Ali, Melora Hardin, Saul Rubinek	United States	Science fiction horror	
Cobweb	Samuel Bodin	Lizzy Caplan, Antony Starr, Cleopatra Coleman, Woody Norman	United States	Horror thriller	
Cocaine Bear	Elizabeth Banks	Keri Russell, O'Shea Jackson Jr., Alden Ehrenreich, Christian Convery, Brooklynn Prince, Isiah Whitlock Jr., Margo Martindale, Ray Liotta, Jesse Tyler Ferguson	United States	Comedy horror	
Cocaine Shark	Mike Polonia	Samantha Coolidge, Ryan Dalton, Natalie Himmelberger, Titus Himmelberger, Jeff Kirkendall, Noyes J. Lawton, Kyle Rappaport, Ken Van Sant	Japan, United States	Mockbuster	
Consecration	Christopher Smith	Jena Malone, Danny Huston, Ian Pirie, Janet Suzman, Will Keen	United Kingdom	Supernatural horror	
Craving	J. Horton	Rachel Amanda Bryant, Al Gomez, Gregory Blair, Ashley Undercuffler, Kevin Caliber, Holly Rockwell, Xavier Roe, Felissa Rose	United States	Horror	
D' Asawang Slayerz	Ricky Rivero	Mel Martinez, Athalia Badere, Christian Antolin	Philippines	Independent Horror Comedy	
Dark Harvest	David Slade	Casey Likes, E'myri Crutchfield, Dustin Ceithamer, Elizabeth Reaser, Jeremy Davies	United States	Fantasy Horror	
Dear David	John McPhail	Augustus Prew, Andrea Bang, René Escobar Jr., Cameron Nicoll, Justin Long	United States	Supernatural Horror	
Deliver Us	Cru Ennis, Lee Roy Kunz	Jaune Kimmel, Thomas Kretschmann, Lee Roy Kunz, Marko Leht	United States	Religious Horror	
Devilreaux	Thomas J. Churchill	Vincent M. Ward, Tony Todd	United States	Horror thriller	
Divinity	Eddie Alcazar	Stephen Dorff, Moises Arias, Jason Genao, Karrueche Tran, Michael O'Hearn, Emily Willis, Scott Bakula, Bella Thorne	United States	Science Fiction Thriller	
Don't Look Away	Micheal Bafaro	Kelly Bastard, Michael Mitton, Colm Hill, Rene Lai	Canada	Supernatural horror	
El Conde	Pablo Larraín	Jaime Vadell, Gloria Münchmeyer, Alfredo Castro, Paula Luchsinger	Chile	Black comedy Horror	
Elevator Game	Rebekah McKendry	Megan Best, Adam Hurtig, Gino Anania, Madison MacIsaac, Verity Marks	United States	Supernatural horror	
Evil Dead Rise	Lee Cronin	Alyssa Sutherland, Lily Sullivan, Gabrielle Echols, Morgan Davies, Nell Fisher, Mia Challis	United States	Supernatural horror	
Fear	Deon Taylor	Joseph Sikora, Andrew Bachelor, Annie Ilonzeh, Ruby Modine, Iddo Goldberg, Terrence Jenkins, Jessica Allain, Tip "T.I." Harris	United States	Psychological horror	
Five Nights at Freddy's	Emma Tammi	Josh Hutcherson, Matthew Lillard, Mary Stuart Masterson, Elizabeth Lail	United States	Supernatural horror	
Founders Day	Erik Bloomquist	Naomi Grace, Devin Druid, William Russ, Amy Hargreaves, Catherine Curtin and Emilia McCarthy	United States	Political slasher	
Gangnam Zombie	Lee Soo-seong	Ji Il-joo, Park Ji-yeon	South Korea	Zombie horror	
Godless: The Eastfield Exorcism	Nick Kozakis	Georgia Eyers, Dan Ewing, Tim Pocock, Rosie Traynor, Eliza Matengu	Australia	Supernatural horror	
Godzilla Minus One	Takashi Yamazaki	Ryunosuke Kamiki, Minami Hamabe, Yuki Yamada, Munetaka Aoki, Hidetaka Yoshioka, Sakura Ando, Kuranosuke Sasaki	Japan	Kaiju	
Haunted Mansion	Justin Simien	LaKeith Stanfield, Tiffany Haddish, Owen Wilson, Rosario Dawson, Danny DeVito	United States	Supernatural horror	
Haunting of the Queen Mary	Gary Shore	Alice Eve, Joel Fry	United Kingdom	Horror	
Hell House LLC Origins: The Carmichael Manor	Stephen Cognetti	Bridget Rose Perrotta, Destiny Leilani Brown, James Liddell, Gideon Berger	United States	Found footage Horror	
Hemet, or the Landlady Don't Drink Tea	Tony Olmos	Kimberly Weinberger, Brian Patrick Butler, Aimee La Joie, Randy Davison, Merrick McCartha, Matthew Rhodes, Nick Young, Pierce Wallace, Derrick Acosta, Mark Atkinson	United States	Comedy horror fantasy political satire	
Herd	Steven Pierce	Ellen Adair, Mitzi Akaha, Corbin Bernsen, Timothy V. Murphy, Jeremy Holm, Amanda Fuller, Dana Snyder, Matt Walton, Mallory Hawks	United States	Relationship Thriller	
Home for Rent	Sopon Sukdapisit	Nittha Jirayungyurn, Sukollawat Kanaros, Penpak Sirikul	Thailand	Horror Mystery Thriller	
House of Ka	Josie Eli Herman	Allison Megroet, Jeffrey Shawn Miller, Yesmeen Mikhail	United States	Supernatural horror	
Human Hibachi 2	Mario Cerrito	Frank Volpe, Nicholas Brennan, Raymond Bolden, Julie Chapin	United States	Found footage horror	
Humanist Vampire Seeking Consenting Suicidal Person	Ariane Louis-Seize	Sara Montpetit, Félix-Antoine Bénard	Canada	Comedy drama horror	
The Hyperborean	Jesse Thomas Cook	Liv Collins, Tony Burgess, Jessica Vano, Ry Barrett	Canada	Comedy science fiction horror	
In Flames	Zarrar Kahn	Rameesha Nawal, Bakhtawar Mazhar, Adnan Shah Tipu, Omair Javaid	Canada, Pakistan	Supernatural horror	
In My Mother's Skin	Kenneth Dagatan	Beauty Gonzalez, Felicity Kyle Napuli, James Mavie Estrella, Angeli Bayani, Ronnie Lazaro, Arnold Reyes, Noel Sto. Domingo, Jasmine Curtis-Smith	Philippines, Singapore, Taiwan	Supernatural horror	
Infinity Pool	Brandon Cronenberg	Alexander Skarsgård, Mia Goth, Cleopatra Coleman, Jalil Lespert, Amanda Brugel	United States	Science fiction horror thriller	
Inhuman Kiss: The Last Breath	Paphangkorn Punchantarak	Krissanapoom Pibulsonggram, Chanya McClory, Joe Cummings, Krissada Sukosol Clapp, Paul Spurrier	Thailand	Supernatural horror Romance	
Inside	Vasilis Katsoupis	Willem Dafoe	Germany	Psychological thriller	
Insidious: The Red Door	Patrick Wilson	Patrick Wilson, Rose Byrne, Ty Simpkins, Peter Dager, Sinclair Daniel, Hiam Abbass	United States	Supernatural horror	
Isle of Doom	Keke Soikkeli	Sonja Aiello, Konsta Hietanen, Markku Pulli	Finland	Slasher film	
It Lives Inside	Bishal Dutta	Megan Suri, Neeru Bajwa, Vik Sahay, Betty Gabriel	United States	Supernatural horror	
It's a Wonderful Knife	Tyler MacIntyre	Jane Widdop, Joel McHale, Katharine Isabelle, Justin Long	United States	Christmas comedy-horror	
Jagged Mind	Kelley Kali	Maisie Richardson-Sellers, Shannon Woodward	United States	Psychological horror	
Kampon	King Palisoc	Beauty Gonzalez, Derek Ramsay	Philippines	Horror	
Kids Vs. Aliens	Jason Eisener	Dominic Mariche, Phoebe Rex, Calem MacDonald	Canada	Horror	
Killer Book Club	Carlos Alonso	Veki Velilla, Ãlvaro Mel, IvÃ¡n Pellicer, Hamza Zaidi, Ane Rot, Priscilla Delgado, María Cerezuela, Carlos Alcaide	Spain	Horror, Slasher	
Knock at the Cabin	M. Night Shyamalan	Dave Bautista, Rupert Grint, Nikki Amuka-Bird, Ben Aldridge, Jonathan Groff, Abby Quinn	United States	Horror thriller	
Late Night with the Devil	Cameron Cairnes, Colin Cairnes	David Dastmalchian, Laura Gordon, Fayssal Bazzi, Georgina Haig, Josh Quong Tart	Australia	Horror	
Lovely, Dark, and Deep	Teresa Sutherland	Georgina Campbell, Nick Blood, Wai Ching Ho	United States	Horror	
Mallari	Roderick Cabrido	Piolo Pascual, Janella Salvador, Elisse Joson, JC Santos, Gloria Diaz	Philippines	Horror	
Malum	Anthony DiBlasi	Jessica Sula, Eric Olson, Chaney Morrow and Candice Coke	United States	Horror	
Mannequin	Jason Wright	Dawna Lee Heising, Laurence R. Harvey, Dani Thompson, Bill Houskeeper	United Kingdom	Independent Horror	
Marry My Dead Body	Cheng Wei-hao	Greg Hsu, Austin Lin, Gingle Wang	Taiwan	Supernatural comedy mystery horror	
Mary Cherry Chua	Roni Benaid	Joko Diaz, Lyca Gairanod, Kokoy De Santos, Alma Moreno	Philippines	Supernatural horror thriller	
Mike & Fred vs The Dead	Anthony Leone	Felissa Rose, George Jac, Brian Patrick Butler, Michael C. Burgess, Sadie Katz, Jayce Venditti, Nick Young	United States	Zombie horror comedy	
My Animal	Jacqueline Castel	Bobbi Salvör Menuez, Amandla Stenberg	Canada	Werewolf Horror Romance	
Mystery Highway	Clarke M. Smith	Rachel Elizabeth Ames, Christopher Cendana, Randy Davison, Larry Poole, James Steinberg, Whitney Wegman-Wood, Walter M. Nowosad Jr., Shane P. Allen	United States	Horror Anthology	
Namo Bhoothathma 2	V. Murali	Komal, Lekha Chandra, Govinde Gowda	India	Horror comedy	
Neelavelicham	Aashiq Abu	Tovino Thomas, Rima Kallingal, Roshan Mathew, Shine Tom Chacko	India	Horror Thriller	
Nefarious	Chuck Konzelman, Cary Solomon	Sean Patrick Flanery, Jordan Belfi, Glenn Beck	United States	Psychological thriller horror	
Nightmare Resort	Jirô Nagae	Rikka Ihara, Taiyu Fujiwara, Shiori Akita, Yûya Matsuura, Mamoru Tsubochi, Hinako Saeki	Japan	Supernatural, Horror	
No One Will Save You	Brian Duffield	Kaitlyn Dever	United States	Science Fiction Thriller	
Organ Trail	Michael Patrick Jann	Zoé De Grand Maison, Mather Zickel, Lisa LoCicero	United States	Western Horror	
Pandemonium	Quarxx	Hugo Dillon, Arben Bajraktaraj, Ophélia Kolb	France	Supernatural horror, anthology	
Perpetrator	Jennifer Reeder	Kiah McKirnan, Alicia Silverstone, Chris Lowell, Melanie Liburd	United States, France	Horror noir	
Pet Sematary: Bloodlines	Lindsey Beer	Jackson White, Jack Mulhern, Natalie Alyn Lind, Forrest Goodluck, Isabella Star LaBlanc, Pam Grier, Samantha Mathis, Henry Thomas	United States	Supernatural horror	
Phenomena	Carlos Therón	Belén Rueda, Gracia Olayo, Toni Acosta, Emilio Gutiérrez Caba	Spain	Horror Comedy	
Pinoy Ghost Tales	Afi Africa, Jojo Nadela, John Isaac Natividad	Jeric Raval, AJ Raval, DJ Durano, Rob Sy, Ping Medina	Philippines	Independent Horror Anthology	
Pizza 3: The Mummy	Mohan Govind	Ashwin Kakumanu, Pavithrah Marimuthu, Gaurav Narayanan	India	Horror Thriller	
Pulau	Euho	Amelia Henderson, Alif Satar, Sanjna Suri	Malaysia	Supernatural horror	
ReBroken	Kenny Yates	Tobin Bell, Scott Hamm Duenas, Kipp Tribble, Alison Haislip	United States	Supernatural horror thriller	
Renfield	Chris McKay	Nicholas Hoult, Nicolas Cage, Ben Schwartz, Adrian Martinez, Shohreh Aghdashloo, Bess Rous	United States	Horror comedy	
Resident Evil: Death Island	Eiichirō Hasumi	Nicole Tompkins, Kevin Dorman, Matthew Mercer, Stephanie Panisello	Japan	adult animated Action biopunk Horror	
Romancham	Jithu Madhavan	Soubin Shahir, Arjun Ashokan, Sajin Gopu, Siju Sunny, Abin Bino	India	Horror comedy	
Run Rabbit Run	Daina Reid	Sarah Snook, Lily LaTorre, Damon Herriman, Greta Scacchi	Australia	Psychological horror	
Saw X	Kevin Greutert	Tobin Bell, Synnøve Macody Lund, Steven Brand, Michael Beach	United States	Horror thriller	
Scream VI	Matt Bettinelli-Olpin, Tyler Gillett	Courteney Cox, Melissa Barrera, Jasmin Savoy Brown, Mason Gooding, Dermot Mulroney, Jenna Ortega, Hayden Panettiere	United States	Slasher	
Sewu Dino	Kimo Stamboel	Mikha Tambayong, Rio Dewanto, Marthino Lio	Indonesia	Supernatural horror	
Shake, Rattle & Roll Extreme	Richard V. Somes, Jerrold Tarog, Joey de Guzman	Iza Calzado, Jane Oineza, Jane de Leon, RK Bagatsing, Paul Salas, Paolo Gumabao, Rob Gomez, Elle Villanueva, AC Bonifacio, Donna Cariaga, Angel Guardian, Ninong Ry, Phi Palmos, Esnyr Ranollo, Dustin Yu, Miggs Cuaderno, Bryce Eusebio, Mika Reins, Jewel Milag, Sarah Edwards	Philippines	Horror Anthology	
Sister Death	Paco Plaza	Aria Bedmar, Almudena Amor, Maru Valdivielso	Spain	Supernatural horror	
Sleep	Jason Yu	Jung Yu-mi, Lee Sun-kyun	South Korea	Horror comedy mystery	
Slotherhouse	Matthew Goodhue	Lisa Ambalavanar, Stefan Kapičić	United States	Horror comedy	
Snow Falls	Colton Tran	Victoria Moroles, Anne Grace Barlow, John Berchtold	United States	Horror thriller	
Somewhere Quiet	Olivia West Lloyd	Jennifer Kim, Kentucker Audley, Micheál Neeson	United States	Psychological	
Spoonful of Sugar	Mercedes Bryce Morgan	Morgan Saylor, Kat Foster, Keith Powell, David Yow	United States	Psychological horror thriller	
Stopmotion	Robert Morgan	Aisling Franciosi	United Kingdom	Live-action/adult animated horror	
Suitable Flesh	Joe Lynch	Heather Graham, Judah Lewis, Bruce Davison, Johnathon Schaech, Barbara Crampton, Jonah Ray	United States		
Tales From The Occult: Body and Soul	Frank Hui, Daniel Chan	Michelle Wai, Wong You Nam, Terrance Lau, Cecilia Choi, Chu Pak Hong, Kevin Chu	Hong Kong	Horror Thriller Suspense	
Thanksgiving	Eli Roth	Addison Rae, Patrick Dempsey, Jalen Thomas Brooks, Milo Manheim, Gina Gershon, Tim Dillon, Rick Hoffman	United States	Slasher	
That Boy in the Dark	Adolfo Alix Jr.	Joaquin Domagoso, Lotlot de Leon, Glydel Mercado	Philippines	Horror	
The Angry Black Girl and Her Monster	Bomani J. Story	Laya DeLeon Hayes, Denzel Whitaker, Chad L. Coleman	United States	Science fiction horror	
The Black Demon	Adrian Grünberg	Josh Lucas, Fernanda Urrejola, Julio Cesar Cedillo, Raúl Méndez, Héctor Jiménez, Edgar Flores, Omar Chaparro	United States	Science fiction horror	
The Boogeyman	Rob Savage	Sophie Thatcher, Chris Messina, David Dastmalchian, Marin Ireland, Vivien Lyra Blair, Madison Hu	United States	Supernatural horror	
The Deliverance	Lee Daniels	Andra Day, Mo'Nique, Aunjanue Ellis, Rob Morgan, Tasha Smith, Caleb McLaughlin, Omar Epps, Glenn Close	United States	Horror thriller	
The Door	Jaiidev	Bhavana, Ganesh Venkatraman	India	Horror thriller	
The Exorcist: Believer	David Gordon Green	Ellen Burstyn, Leslie Odom Jr.	United States	Supernatural horror	
The Fearway	Robert Gajic	Shannon Dalonzo, Eileen Dietz, Simon Phillips, Jessica Gray	United States	Time loop	
The Forbidden Play	Hideo Nakata	Uika First Summer, Shinobu Hasegawa, Kanna Hashimoto, Mayu Hotta	Japan	Mystery Horror Thriller	
The Jester	Colin Krawchuk	Ken Arnold, Molly Bevetts, Riley Collins, Jesse L. Green	United States	Horror Slasher Mystery	
The Last Voyage of the Demeter	André Øvredal	Corey Hawkins, Aisling Franciosi, Liam Cunningham, David Dastmalchian	United States	Supernatural horror	
The Mill	Sean King O'Grady	Lil Rel Howery	United States	Science Fiction Thriller	
The Nun II	Michael Chaves	Bonnie Aarons	United States	Supernatural horror	
The Offering	Oliver Park	Nick Blood, Emily Wiseman, Allan Corduner, Paul Kaye	United States	Horror thriller	
The Outwaters	Robbie Banfitch	Robbie Banfitch, Angela Basolis, Scott Schamell, Michelle May, Leslie Ann Banfitch	United States	Found footage horror	
The Passenger	Carter Smith	Kyle Gallner, Johnny Berchtold, Liza Weil	United States	Horror Thriller	
The Pope's Exorcist	Julius Avery	Russell Crowe, Alex Essoe, Daniel Zovatto, Franco Nero, Laurel Marsden, Cornell S. John, Peter DeSouza-Feighoney	United States	Supernatural horror thriller	
The Sacrifice Game	Jenn Wexler	Mena Massoud, Olivia Scott Welch, Gus Kenworthy, Madison Baines, Derek Johns, Laurent Pitre, Chloë Levine, Georgia Acken	Canada	Christmas horror	
The Strays	Nathaniel Martello-White	Ashley Madekwe, Bukky Bakray, Lucy Liemann, Rob Jarvis	United Kingdom	Horror thriller	
The Wait	F. Javier Gutiérrez	Víctor Clavijo, Ruth Díaz	Spain	Western	
The Wrath of Becky	Matt Angel, Suzanne Coote	Lulu Wilson, Seann William Scott, Courtney Gains, Denise Burse, Jill Larson, Kate Siegel	United States	Action comedy horror	
The Y	Girideva Raaj	Yuvan Hariharan, Leonilla D'Souza, Prithal Pawar, Kamal Ghimiray, Abhinava Kiran	India	Psychological horror	
There's Something Wrong with the Children	Roxanne Benjamin	Zach Gilford, Amanda Crew, Alisha Wainwright, Carlos Santos	United States	Supernatural horror	
Tiger Stripes	Amanda Nell Eu	Zafreen Zairizal, Deena Ezral, Piqa, Shaheizy Sam, June Lojong, Khairunazwan Rodz, Fatimah Abu Bakar	Malaysia	Body horror	
Til Death Do Us Part	Timothy Woodward Jr.	Cam Gigandet, Jason Patric, Natalie Burn, Orlando Jones Ser'Darius Blain, Pancho Moler, Neb Chupin, D.Y. Sao, Sam Lee Herring, Alan Silva	United States	Horror thriller	
Tin&Tina	Rubin Stein	Milena Smit, Jaime Lorente, Carlos González Morollón, Anastasia Russo	Spain	Religious psychological thriller	
Totally Killer	Nahnatchka Khan	Kiernan Shipka, Olivia Holt, Julie Bowen, Randall Park	United States	Comedy Horror Slasher	
Unseen	Yoko Okumura	Midori Francis, Jolene Purdy, Missi Pyle, Ren Hanami	United States	Horror thriller	
Unwelcome	Jon Wright	Hannah John-Kamen, Douglas Booth, Jamie-Lee O'Donnell, Colm Meaney, Kristian Nairn	United Kingdom	Folk horror	
V/H/S/85	David Bruckner, Scott Derrickson, Gigi Saul Guerrero, Natasha Kermani, Mike P. Nelson		United States	Found footage horror anthology	
Vedi Nowadina Lamai	Indika Ferdinando	Jayalath Manoratne, Hemasiri Liyanage, Mahendra Perera, Anula Bulathsinhala, Ashan Dias	Sri Lanka	Black comedy musical thriller horror	
Victoria - Ek Rahasya	Virajas Kulkarni, Jeet Ashok	Pushkar Jog, Sonalee Kulkarni, Akshay Kulkarni	India	Horror thriller	
Vindicta	Sean McNamara	Elena Kampouris, Jeremy Piven, Sean Astin	United States	Slasher	
Virupaksha	Karthik Varma Dandu	Sai Dharam Tej, Samyuktha, Sunil, Rajeev Kanakala, Brahmaji, Ravi Krishna, Abhinav Gomatam, Kamal Kamaraju, Sai Chand, Ajay, Chatrapathi Sekhar	India	Supernatural thriller horror	
Waktu Maghrib	Sidharta Tata	Nafiza Fatia Rani, Ali Fikry, Bima Sena, Aulia Sarah	Indonesia	Horror Mystery Thriller	
War of the Worlds: The Attack	Junaid Syed	Sam Gittins, Leo Staar, Vincent Regan, Alhaji Fofana	United Kingdom	Science Fiction Thriller	
We Are Zombies	RKSS	Alexandre Nachi, Derek Johns, Megan Peta Hill, Vincent Leclerc	Canada, France	Zombie Horror Comedy	
We Have a Ghost	Christopher Landon	David Harbour, Jahi Winston, Tig Notaro, Jennifer Coolidge, Anthony Mackie	United States	Supernatural horror comedy	
When Evil Lurks	Demián Rugna	Ezequiel Rodríguez, Demián Salomon, Luis Ziembrowski, Silvia Sabater, Marcelo Michinaux	Argentina, United States	Horror	
Winnie-the-Pooh: Blood and Honey	Rhys Frake-Waterfield	Amber Doig-Thorne, Maria Taylor, Danielle Ronald, Natasha Tosini, May Kelly	United Kingdom	Slasher	
You'll Never Find Me	Indianna Bell, Josiah Allen	Brendan Rock, Jordan Cowan	Australia	Horror	
You're Killing Me	Beth Hanna, Jerren Lauder	McKaley Miller, Anne Heche, Dermot Mulroney	United States	Horror thriller	
Zom 100: Bucket List of the Dead	Yûsuke Ishida	Eiji Akaso, Mai Shiraishi, Shuntarô Yanagi, Kazuki Kitamura, Akari Hayami, Yui Ishikawa	Japan	Zombie comedy horror	
Zombie Town	Peter Lepeniotis	Dan Aykroyd, Chevy Chase, Marlon Kazadi	Canada	Zombie Horror Comedy	
