= Bremerhaven Zoo =

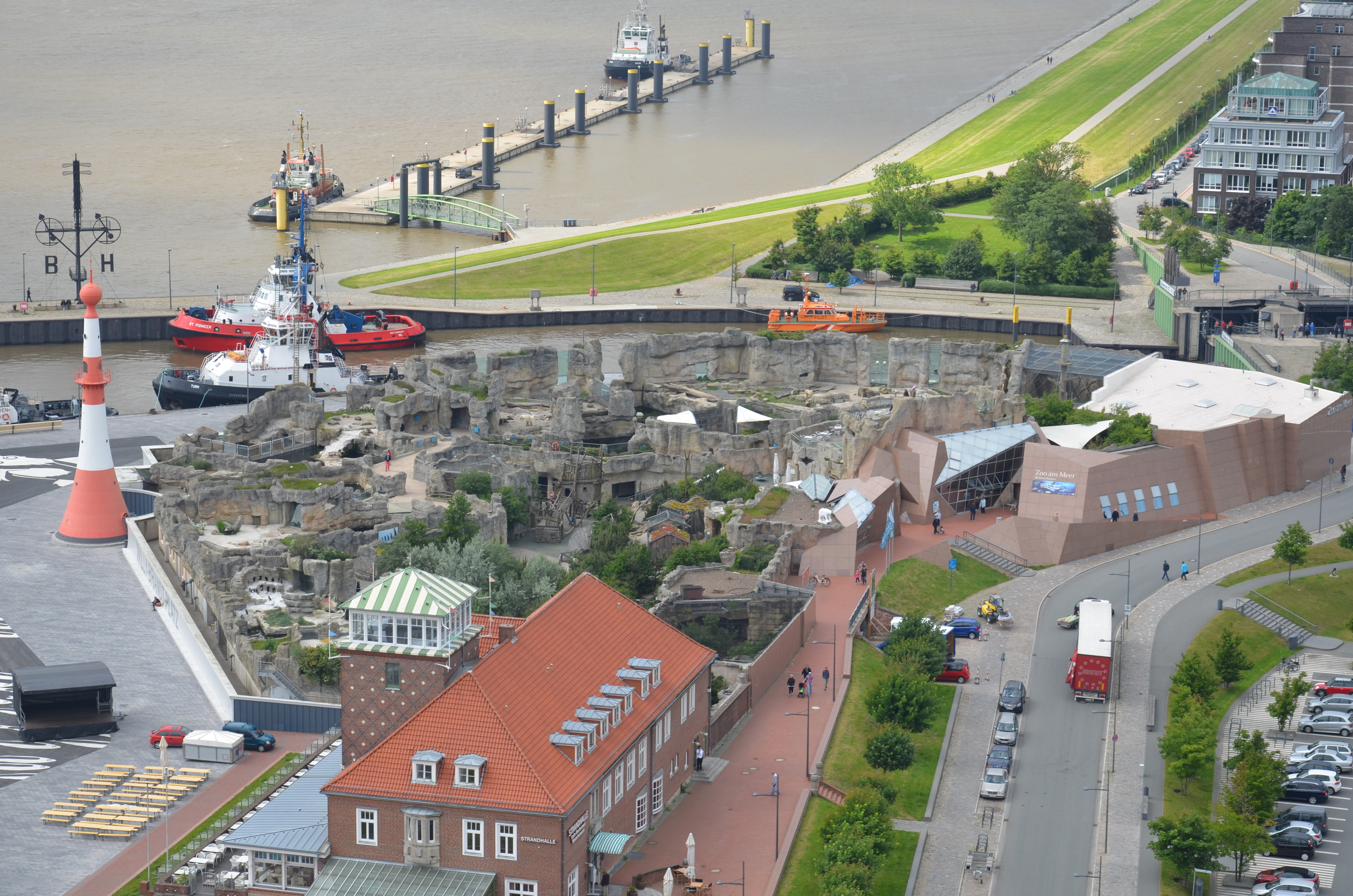
- Bird's eye view of the Zoo (2009)
- Interactive map of Bremerhaven Zoo
- 53°32′41″N 8°34′13″E
- Location: Bremerhaven, Germany
- Land area: 1.2 ha
- No. of animals: 292
- No. of species: 56
- Annual visitors: 100000
- Memberships: WAZA, EAZA, VDZ, yaqupacha.org, Wild Chimpanzee Foundation (WCF), International Species Information System (ISIS)
- Website: http://www.zoo-am-meer-bremerhaven.de/en/

The Bremerhaven Zoo (officially Zoo am Meer [ˈtsoː am ˈmeːɐ̯], which is German for Zoo next to the Sea) is located next to the river Weser and exhibits mainly species which live in the water or in northern environments; exceptions are, for instance, chimpanzees and white-headed marmosets.

== Animals ==
One of Bremerhaven's polar bears swimming.

=== Mammals ===
The main attraction are the polar bears, the South American sea-lions, the harbour seals and the South African fur seals.

=== Birds ===
The northern gannet is naturally abundant in Germany only since 1991 on the high-sea island Helgoland. These birds share their area with cormorants and different ducks.

The Humboldt penguins of the zoo became famous because there was a homosexual penguin couple among them.

=== Other animals ===
The Fischer’s chameleon was found in the woods near Bremerhaven, it is suspected that it was kept illegally by somebody and had been set free when it became too big.

== History ==
In 1912, the North Sea Aquarium started in the cellar so-called Strandhalle. On June 24, 1928, the Tiergrotten (literally Animal Grotto) was opened outside the Weser embankment.

The North Sea flood of 1962 killed a lot of animals in the zoo.

Major renovations took place in 1976 and from 2000 to 2004. The Zoo am Meer was opened on March 27, 2004.

=== Polar bears ===
The polar bear Victoria was transported from Tierpark Hagenbeck on January 10, 2008: (video) to Zoo am Meer with the hope that she and Lloyd might breed. She stayed in Bremerhaven until October 24, 2011.

The polar bear Irka came from Canada to Bremerhaven in 1979 when she was probably a year old and she spent her whole life in the zoo. She was suffering from arthritis when she got old, but she was otherwise fit for a long time. She was euthanized on June 4, 2012, after she became disoriented, lost coordination and a blood test suggested changes in her liver. After her death a tumor was found in her liver.

The eight-year-old polar bear Valeska came to Bremerhaven in September 2012 from the Ranua Wildlife Park in Finland as new partner for Lloyd who has been in Bremerhaven since 2002.

=== Other animals ===
The two baby seals called Luna and Paula were born on 21 and 22 July 2012 by different mothers.

== Future plans ==
The Zoo am Meer will build a new aquarium in the cellar rooms underneath the compound of the polar bears. The exhibit will have an area of 325 m^{2} and will cost around 1.5 million euro which will be paid by the European Regional Development Fund. The operational costs is estimated to be around 70 thousand Euro per year.
