= Tommy and the Wildcat =

- English DVD cover
- Finnish: Poika ja ilves
- Directed by: Raimo O. Niemi; Ville Suhonen
- Written by: Martin Daniel; Matti Haapanen; Ville Suhonen
- Produced by: Hannu Tuomainen
- Starring: Konsta Hietanen; Risto Tuorila; Jarmo Mäkinen
- Cinematography: Kari Sohlberg
- Edited by: Jukka Nykänen
- Music by: Søren Hyldgaard
- Production company: Wildcat Production
- Distributed by: Egmont Film
- Release date: 18 December 1998
- Running time: 102 minutes
- Countries: Finland; Denmark; Luxembourg
- Languages: Finnish, English
- Budget: FIM 13.1 million

Tommy and the Wildcat (Finnish: Poika ja ilves; lit. 'A Boy and the Lynx') is a 1998 Finnish adventure family film directed by Raimo O. Niemi and Ville Suhonen, and starring Konsta Hietanen. It tells story about Tommy, the twelve-year-old boy, who tries to help a lynx named Leevi to survive in the wilderness.

The lynx in the film was a played by lynx named Väinö from the Ranua Zoo. Väinö was born in 1996 and died in May 1999. It is assumed that he climbed up the mesh fence and fell on a sharp stone, which resulted in the death of the animal. Väinö had gotten used to people as a kitty when he had grown up in home care after being abandoned by his mother.

The film was shot in both Finnish and English. The final English dialogue is dubbed over the English-acted version. The production of the film costs were more than 13 million Finnish marks, which made it one of the most expensive film productions in Finland at time. In addition to Ranua, the film was also shot in Posio and Rovaniemi.

The film premiered in Finland on 18 December 1998. It gathered a total of 380,000 viewers in Finland. The film was awarded the People's Choice Award at the Jussi Awards and The Green Screen Prize at the 2000 Chicago International Children's Film Festival. In August 2019, the film was released in cinemas again as a restored version.

== Plot ==
12-year-old Tommy (Konsta Hietanen) moves to Lapland with his zoologist father Olli Oksa (Antti Virmavirta). Father's job is to return the Leevi lynx back to nature, but reindeer herders don't like a beast that threatens their property. Olli tells his late wife's brother Jouko (Risto Tuorila), Tommy's uncle, that Tommy still hasn't gotten over his mother's (Katariina Kaitue) death. Tommy asks Jouko about his mother and Jouko tell him that her sister Maria was on the side of the lynx. Tommy makes friends with Leevi at the Ranua Zoo and hears from the zoo employee Jaska (Rauno Ahonen) that it will be sold to a Turkish zoo. Tommy tries to prevent the deal from happening, but he is chased away from the meeting between the zoo manager (Mikko Kivinen) and Tommy's father. However, the manager agrees to one more test, but if the lynx does not learn to prey, it will be sold.

Leevi fails the predation test. When Olli is ready to give up on the lynx, Tommy gets furious. He hides in a truck carrying Leevi. When Jaska stops the car because of a run-over fox, Tommy releases Leevi. The young conservationist Oula (Jussi Puhakka) calls Tom out of the forest and prevents him from feeding the lynx, because then the animal won't learn to hunt on its own. Leevi gets trapped in a cage equipped with a radio signal at some point, but Tommy tries to save it from trouble. When Olli and his entourage arrive, Tommy has managed to move the lynx's cage away. With the help of the log raft left by Oula, the boy crosses the river and frees Leevi again.

In winter, Olli still tries to catch a lynx, without success. After this, Herman Haapala (Jarmo Mäkinen), known as a local animal stuffer, plans to go hunting for lynx. Oula tells Tommy that Leevi has no chance when Haapala starts chasing. Tommy learns that Jouko has paid his debt to Haapala by killing the lynx that Tommy's late mother tried to take care of, which makes Tommy angry with his uncle. When the lynx kills Jouko's geese and Haapala forces Jouko into the lynx hunting, Jouko locks Tommy in the barn. However, repentant Jouko's mind changes after going hunting with Haapala on snowmobiles, which makes Haapala angry and continue his journey alone. Meanwhile, Tommy manages to break out of the barn and jumps on skis until Oula takes him on the snowmobile.

The boys find Leevi, who is caught in a trap and is trying to free himself. Oula goes to get help while Tommy stays with Leevi. Soon Haapala arrives and is about to shoot Leevi, but Tommy stands in front of him and attacks the man. Haapala shakes the boy off, saying the lynx is hurt. When he approaches the lynx with a gun, Leevi attacks at the last moment to break free from the trap and both fall down into the ravine. Tommy finds a badly wounded Haapala at the bottom of the gorge. Tommy tries to drag the unaware Haapala out of the forest on a sled, but the slow progress leads to the darkening of the night and increasing frost. The lynx that appeared on the scene guides Tommy with his sled to the deserted cabin. At the same time, a border guard helicopter is searching for them with a thermal camera. Eventually, a search party finds them.

After recovering, Tommy meets Jouko, who apologizes for killing the lynx protected by the boy's mother. Tommy hugs Jouko as a sign of forgiveness, and Jouko tells Tommy to take care of the lynx found in the barn so that it can be released back into the wild. Tommy is leaving with the lynx, when Haapala comes to the scene on crutches and with a gesture of reconciliation states that the lynx is now the boy's, advising: "Take it so far that no one can find it". Tommy releases Leevi into the wild and with tears in his eyes finally drives it away from him. The lynx disappears into the snowy forest.

== Cast ==
- Konsta Hietanen as Tommy (Tomi) Oksa
- Risto Tuorila as Uncle Jouko
- Jarmo Mäkinen as Herman Haapala
- Antti Virmavirta as Olli Oksa
- Kristiina Halttu as Helena Torvinen
- Rauno Ahonen as Jaska
- Jussi Puhakka as Oula
- Markku Huhtamo as Kalle Pokka
- Mikko Kivinen as zoo manager
- Katariina Kaitue as Maria Oksa

=== English version ===
- Michael Caloz as Tommy
- Michael Copeman as Haapala
- Adrian Truss as Tomi's father
- Kirsten Bishop as Helena
- Tony Daniels as Jaska
- Robert Tinkler as Oula
- Aron Tager as Pokka
- Richard Blackburn as park director
- J. W. Carroll as chief of police
- Vincent Corazza as junior herdsman
- Paulino Nunes as policeman
- Steve Lederman as helicopter pilot

== See also ==
- Mystery of the Wolf
