= Isle of Doom =

- Original Finnish film poster
- Finnish: Tuomion saari
- Directed by: Keke Soikkeli
- Written by: Keke Soikkeli
- Produced by: Jesse Tervolin; Keke Soikkeli
- Starring: Sonja Aiello; Konsta Hietanen; Markku Pulli; Elmeri Rantalainen; Emma Lahti
- Cinematography: Teemu Villikka
- Edited by: Teemu Villikka
- Music by: Olli Rantanen; Eetu Hämäläinen
- Production companies: Same-eYes Production; Nordic Films
- Distributed by: Kuusan Kino
- Release date: 29 December 2023 (Finland)
- Running time: 90 minutes
- Country: Finland
- Language: Finnish

Isle of Doom (Finnish: Tuomion saari) is a 2023 Finnish slasher horror film written, co-produced and directed by Keke Soikkeli. It tells the story of a group of young adults who go camping on a remote lake island, where they are stalked by someone. The film is introducing Sonja Aiello in the leading role.

The film premiered on 29 December 2023. It received poor reviews from critics in preview screenings.

== Plot ==
Mia learns that her boyfriend Eetu is cheating on her and she goes to live with her friend Maija to recover from the shock. Maija decides to take Mia to a summer bar with her friends Rami, Laura and Kimmo, where Mia falls in love with the porter Teemu. At the bar, they try to think of some kind of pastime for Mia to get her mind off Eetu's infidelity and soon they come up with going to a remote lake island, which is called the "Isle of Doom". There is an urban legend about the island, according to which a young boy guilty of murdering his baby sister was banished to the island by his father and left there to die. Mia agrees to this idea and the next day they go camping on the island. After spending the night there, Laura starts to get nervous about the atmosphere on the island, which the horror story left behind. The situation is not made easier by the fact that there is indeed a small abandoned cottage on the island, which would indicate that someone actually lived there. And when their boat disappears while they are trapped on the island, they soon begin to realize that what started out as a "horror story" has some kind of basis of truth.

== Cast ==
- Sonja Aiello as Mia
- Konsta Hietanen as Kimmo
- Markku Pulli as Teemu
- Elmeri Rantalainen as Timo
- Emma Lahti as Maija
- Jenni Rautiainen as Laura
- Karo Auvinen as Rami
- Linnea Leino as Ilona
- Viivi Mauno as Emma
- Toni Lipsanen as Eetu / The Killer

== Production ==
The crew of the film shot on a small budget consisted of both professionals and enthusiasts. The Finnish Film Foundation did not grant the film any financial support.

The film was shot in Kouvola and Iitti.

== Reception ==
The film has received negative reception from critics. Tero Kartastenpää from Helsingin Sanomat gives the film one star out of five, saying that "the hollow acting performances make the film impossible to watch seriously, and in all its risk-avoiding, it won't even become a gem of cheesy horror." Also, Taneli Topelius from Ilta-Sanomat and Henri Waltter Rehnström from Turun Sanomat both gave the film only one star out of five, the latter summarizing that "the film belongs more to YouTube than to the big screen." However, Jouni Vikman from Episodi, who gave the film two stars out of five, states in his assessment that "taking into account the fact that how difficult it is to make a genre film in Finland—especially without the support of the Finnish Film Foundation—I have to raise my hat to the film by necessity."

J. A. Kerswell of the Hysteria Lives website describes in his review the film as "forgettable", saying that "the camerawork is rich and expansive, but the film quickly falls apart when we are introduced to the main cast", and "the killer has little presence and, despite his ever handy axe, dodders around like an octogenarian at a buffet".

== See also ==
- List of Finnish films of the 2020s
- List of horror films of 2023
- Slasher film
