= Betrayal (2023 film) =

2023 film directed by Rodger Griffiths

- British poster for the film titled Kill
- Directed by: Rodger Griffiths
- Written by: Rodger Griffiths; Robert Drummond
- Music by: Max Aruj; Steffen Thum
- Production companies: Creative Scotland; Great Point Media; Library Pictures International; MR. B Films; Northern Ireland Screen
- Distributed by: Kaleidoscope Film Distribution
- Release dates: August 2023 (Edinburgh Film Festival); 7 September 2024 (United States)
- Running time: 89 minutes
- Country: United Kingdom
- Language: English

Betrayal is a 2023 independent psychological horror thriller and survivalist film directed by Rodger Griffiths, in his directorial debut. Its premiere at the 2023 Edinburgh International Film Festival titled Kill. It was released in the United Kingdom by Kaleidoscope Film Distribution and Saban Films on VOD/digital in the United States on 6 September 2024.

It was inspired by 2018's Calibre.

== Synopsis ==
Three brothers try to discover what happened to the body of their abusive father who they killed and buried in a remote Scottish forest.

== Cast ==
- James Harkness – Miller
- Brian Vernel – John
- Daniel Portman – Henry
- Paul Higgins – Don
- Calum Ross – Vince
- Joanne Thomson – Annie
- Anita Vettesse – Kate

== Production ==
Principal photography started on 6 June 2022.

== Reception ==
In his review in The Guardian, Leslie Felperin rated it 3 out of 5 stars saying that "the suspense-building and denouement are adequate enough, but what makes this more interesting is how director Rodger Griffiths weaves in a subtle dissection of how abuse can damage families in different ways." At Common Sense Media, Alistair Lawrence rated it 2 out of 5 stars calls it a "overplotted Scottish thriller".

In Screen Daily, Fionnuala Halligan highlighted that "a forest hunting trip takes a dark turn in this effective Scottish genre debut".

== See also ==
- Survival film
- List of thriller films of the 2020s
- List of horror films of 2023
