= Sofia Zida =

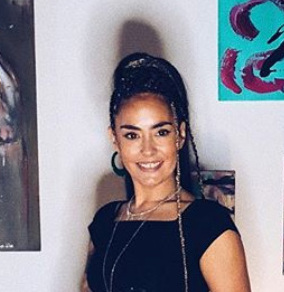
- Art exhibition by Zida in the Red art gallery

Background information
- Also known as: Sofia Zida
- Born: Sofia Stenman; 1984 (age 41–42)
- Origin: Vaasa, Finland
- Genres: pop; dance
- Occupations: Singer, songwriter, DJ, painter
- Years active: 2002–present
- Labels: EMI/Virgin (2002–2007); Rithem (2008–2009)
- Website: https://www.sofiazida.net/
- homesite

Sofia Stenman (born 1984), better known as Sofia Zida, is a Mexican-Finnish singer-songwriter. She has released two albums, "Disco Mamazida" and "Butterfly", along with numerous singles. She works primarily in Finland.

== Life and musical career ==
=== 1984–2005: Early life and early career ===
Born in Vaasa, Finland to a Finnish mother and a Mexican father, Sofia relocated to Helsinki, the capital of Finland at the age of thirteen. Her first public performance was at the age of eight in children's singing contest called "Tenavatähti". At the age of 15 Sofia signed her first record deal with Universal Music Finland and recorded two singles with a group called 'F2F'.

=== 2006–present: International releases and recording in Finnish ===
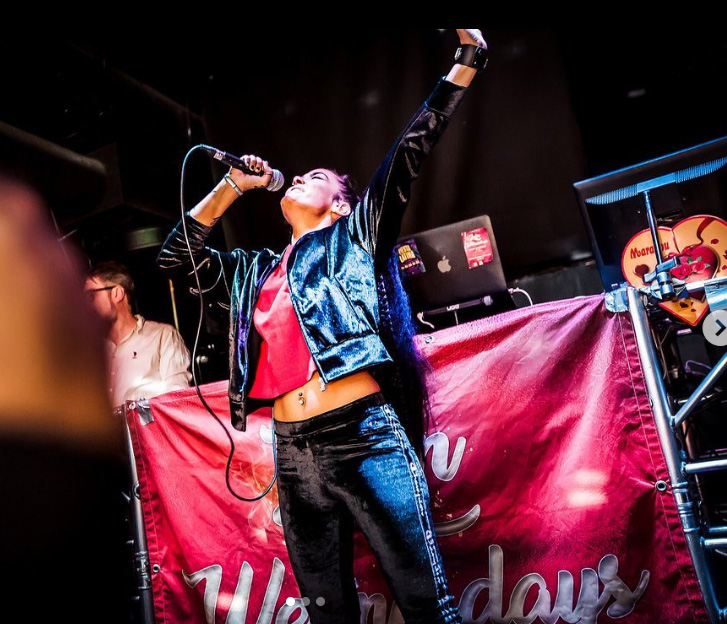
Sofia Zida performing live in Helsinki, Finland.

In 2006 Zida went on with her solo career by signing a record deal with EMI. The debut single 'You Know What To Do' was Sofia's first hit song as a solo artist released under the name "Sofia". In 2006 Sofia Zida released her first album Disco Mamazida (EMI) under the name "Sofia Zida".

The title song was a huge success and the single hit several club charts in Finland making the song one of the most played songs in clubs and radios. In 2006 Sofia was awarded as the "Best Newcomer" chosen by the Finnish Disco Chart Team.

In 2008 Sofia Zida changed her surname to "Sida" and released her first international single. The song "Reason" was released in July 2008. After recording her album in Sweden, Sofia Sida's second studio album Butterfly was released in September 2009.

The music video for the title song Butterfly was shot in Helsinki, New York and Los Angeles and it was directed by awarded American-Finnish female director, Tii Ricks. In 2010 American DJ / Producer DJ Cadet produced exclusive remixes of Sofia's songs Reason and Party Freak. Remixes were released through American record label Active Ingredient Records.

After "Butterfly" -album Sida changed her surname back to "Zida" and moved to Stockholm. In 2012–2015 Zida concentrated on raising his newly born son in Sweden before returning to Finland in 2015. In 2016 her new single, "Guerrera" was released in Finland through Kaiku Entertainment and distributed by Warner Music Finland. "Guerrera" is the first single for Sofia Zida has recorded in the Finnish language. The song is produced by a Finnish producer, Jurek.

== Musical style and performance ==
Sofia Zida's musical style has changed after the release of her first album. Disco Mamazida being completely based on dance beats her music nowadays includes various styles of musical genres, including dance-pop, pop rock and also Latin music styles.

== Career as a DJ ==
Since 2014, Zida has worked actively as a DJ. Her main style is club-oriented Latin-American music. Her DJ career is maintained by L4 events.

== Visual artwork and paintings ==
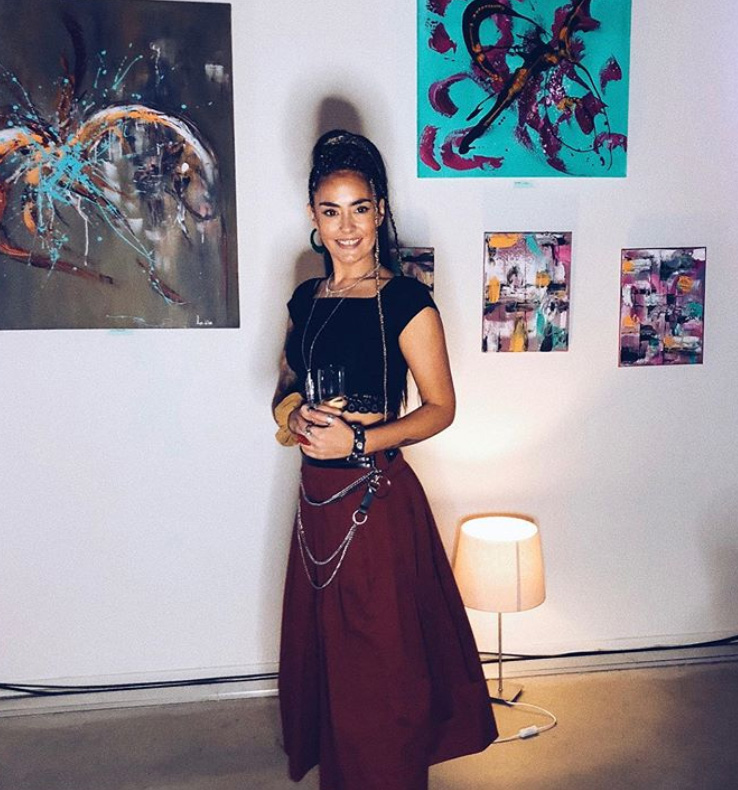
Sofia Zida in the opening of her art exhibition.

Since 2014 has worked as a painter and has so far done 12 exhibitions. She describes her style as "explosive and temperamental".

== Discography ==
- 2002: As: F2F – 2 single releases
- 2005: As: Sofia – You Know What To Do (CDs)
- 2006: As: Sofia Zida – Disco Mamazida (CDs)
- 2006: As: Sofia Zida – Disco Mamazida (CD)
- 2008: As: Sofia Sida – Reason (CDs)
- 2009: As: Sofia Sida – Party Freak (CDs)
- 2009: As: Sofia Sida – Butterfly (promotional CDs)
- 2009: As: Sofia Sida – Butterfly (CD)
- 2009: As: DJ Cadet ft. Sofia Sida – Party Freak DJ Cadet Remixes (digital)
- 2010: As: DJ Cadet ft. Sofia Sida – Reason DJ Cadet Remixes (digital)
- 2012: As: Sofia Zida – Blah Blah Blah (promotional single)
- 2016: As: Sofia Zida – Guerrera (digital)

== Awards ==
- Best Newcomer 2007 chosen by Finnish Disco Chart Team (FDCT).

== Homesite ==
www.sofiazida.net
