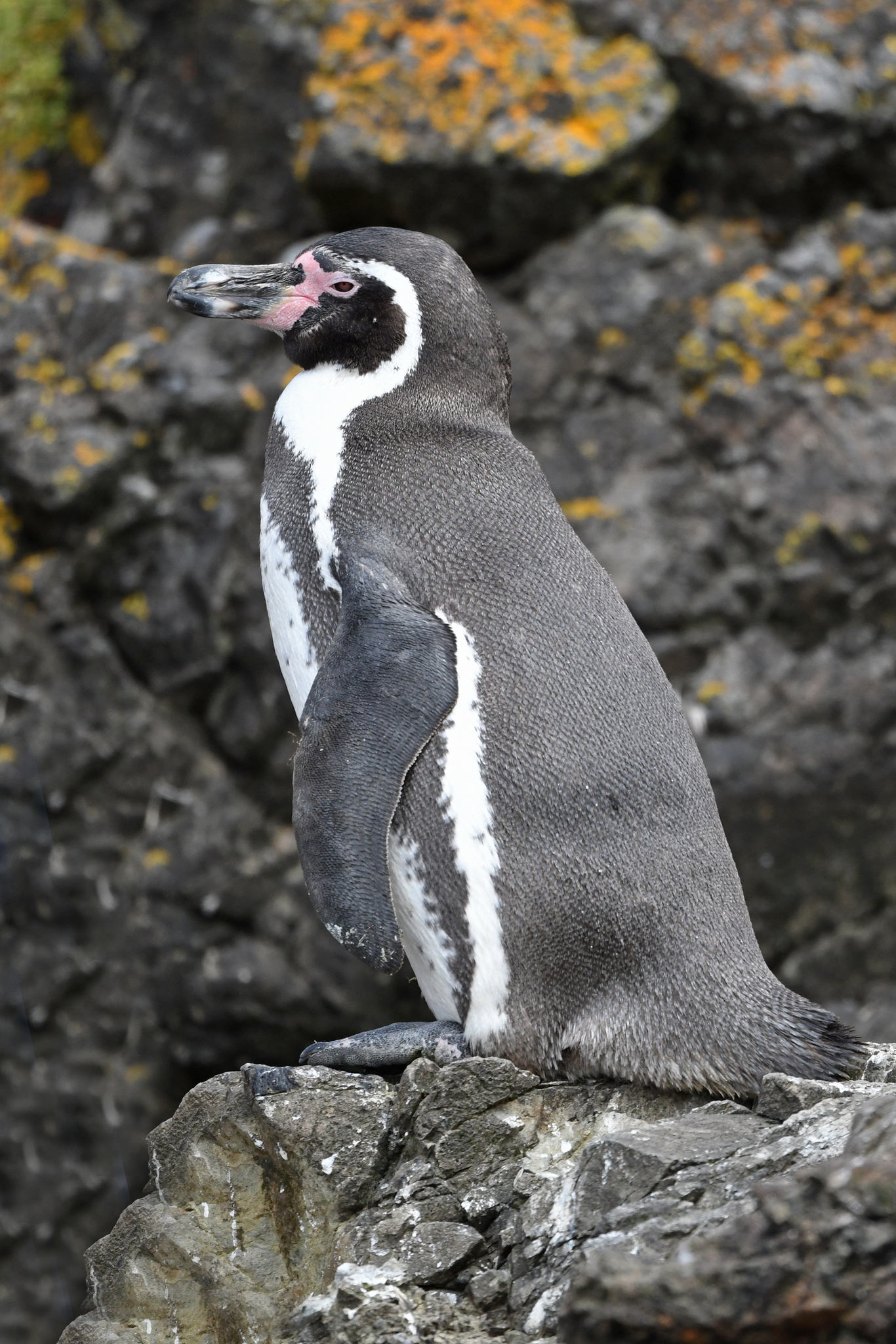
- In Chile

Conservation status
- Vulnerable (IUCN 3.1)
- CITES Appendix I

Scientific classification
- Kingdom: Animalia
- Phylum: Chordata
- Class: Aves
- Order: Sphenisciformes
- Family: Spheniscidae
- Genus: Spheniscus
- Species: S. humboldti

Binomial name
- Spheniscus humboldti Meyen, 1834
- Distribution of the Humboldt penguin. 80% of the world's population lives in the protected areas of the Northern Chilean regions of Atacama and Coquimbo.

= Humboldt penguin =

Species of bird

The Humboldt penguin (Spheniscus humboldti) is a medium-sized penguin. It resides in South America, along the Pacific coast of Peru and Chile. Its nearest relatives are the African penguin, the Magellanic penguin and the Galápagos penguin. The Humboldt penguin and the cold water current it swims in are both named after the explorer Alexander von Humboldt. The species is listed as vulnerable by the IUCN with no population recovery plan in place. The current wild population is composed of roughly 23,800 mature individuals and is declining. It is a migrant species.

Humboldt penguins nest on islands and rocky coasts, burrowing holes in guano and sometimes using scrapes or caves. In South America the Humboldt penguin is found only along the Pacific coast, and the range of the Humboldt penguin overlaps that of the Magellanic penguin on the central Chilean coast. It is vagrant in Ecuador and Colombia. The Humboldt penguin has been known to live in mixed species colonies with the Magellanic penguin in at least two different locations at the south of Chile.

The Humboldt penguin has become a focus of ecotourism over the last decades.

== Etymology ==
Both the Humboldt penguin and the Humboldt current were named after Alexander von Humboldt. It is known in Peru as the pajaro-niño, which translates to "baby-bird", due to their waddling gait and flightless wings held out suggesting the image of an infant toddling on the beach.

== Distribution and habitat ==
The Humboldt penguin is endemic to the west coast of South America.

The Humboldt penguin's breeding distribution ranges from southern Chile along the dry and arid coastal regions of the Atacama Desert to subtropical Isla Foca in north Peru. Its range is restricted to the coast and offshore islands affected by the Humboldt current, which provides a continuous supply of nutrients and food, thus supporting huge populations of seabird. In Chile, the most important breeding colony is at Isla Chañaral.

In July 2002, a Humboldt penguin was caught in a fishing net off the coast of Prince of Wales Island in Alaska. The penguin was released from the net, and eventually sent back to the water by one of the fishermen. This is the first and only record of a penguin in the wild in North America. It is unknown whether the penguin was a wild penguin or an escaped pet or zoo animal.

== Description ==
Humboldt penguins are medium-sized penguins, growing to 56–70 cm (22–28 in) long and a weight of 2.9 to 6 kg (6.4 to 13.2 lb). The sex of the Humboldt penguin cannot be recognised via differences in plumage, as they are monomorphic. The male is heavier and larger than the females. Their sex can be determined via head width and bill length; the male has a longer bill than the female. While all the Spheniscus penguins are close to each other in size, the Humboldt penguin is the heaviest species in the genus, with 123 females weighing 4.05 kg (8.9 lb) on average and 165 males averaging 4.7 kg (10 lb). Humboldt penguins have a black head with a white border that runs from behind the eye, around the black ear-coverts and chin, and joins at the throat. They have blackish-grey upperparts and whitish underparts, with a black breast-band that extends down the flanks to the thigh. They have a fleshy-pink base to the bill. Juveniles have dark heads and no breast-band. They have spines on their tongue which they use to hold their prey.

=== Vocalisation ===
The Humboldt penguin has different calls that it uses to communicate in different ways. The function of its calls are consistent among Spheniscus species. If an individual comes too close to an adult Humboldt penguin, the Yell is a warning call which is followed by pecking or chasing if ignored. A higher density of penguins leads to more territorial and aggressive behaviours, which leads to more Yells. The Throb is a soft call between pairs at the nest, used by incubating birds when their mates return to the nest. The Haw is a short call given by juveniles alone in the water and by paired birds when one is on the water and the other is on land. It has significant individual variation in duration and frequency. The Bray is a long call used to attract a mate and advertise a territory during the pre-laying and pre-hatching periods. It is an individually distinct call in all variables: syllables per call, duration, inter-syllable intervals, duration of syllables and frequency. When calling, the bird points its head upwards and flaps its flippers slowly. The Courtship Bray is similar to the Bray, however a different posture is assumed and is given synchronously by pairs during the pre-laying period: the birds stand together pointing their necks and head up, with flippers out to the side. The Peep is given by chicks begging for food.

=== Moulting ===
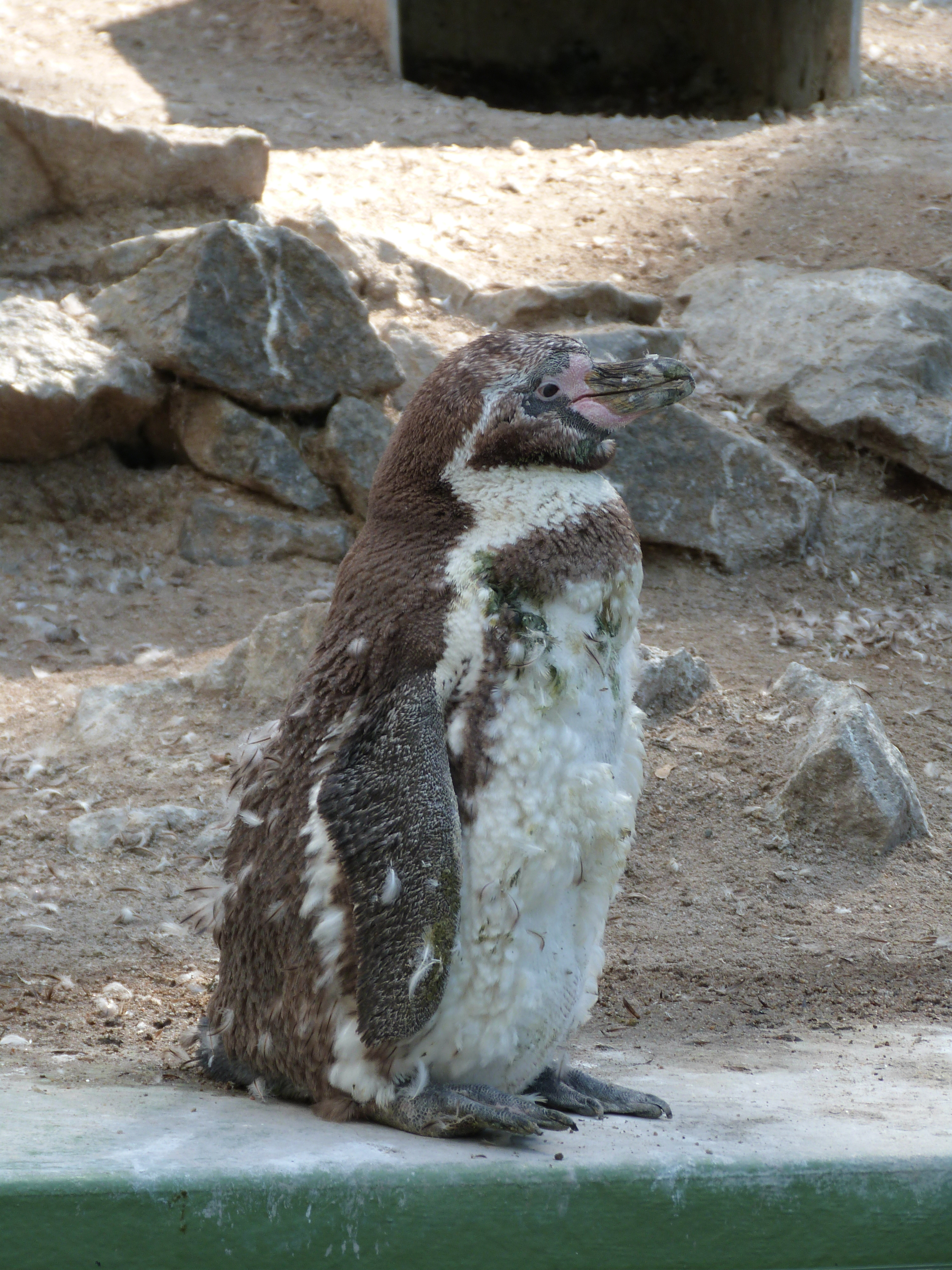
Moulting, at the Halle Zoo, in Germany

Most penguins moult between mid-January and mid-February, however the initiation varies with latitude and favourable conditions such as food abundance. Humboldt penguins are confined to land until they finish moulting. They become hyperphagic during the pre-moulting period. The feathers are lost and replaced within 2 weeks.

== Ecology ==
=== Diet ===
The Humboldt penguin feeds predominantly on pelagic schooling fish. The consumption of cephalopods (namely Antarctic flying squid) and crustaceans vary between populations. Northern colonies consume primarily Atlantic saury and garfish, whilst southern populations primarily consume anchovy, Araucanian herring, silver-side, pilchard and squid. There are seasonal differences in the Humboldt penguin's diet that reflect the changes in availability of fish species across seasons.

=== Foraging behaviour ===
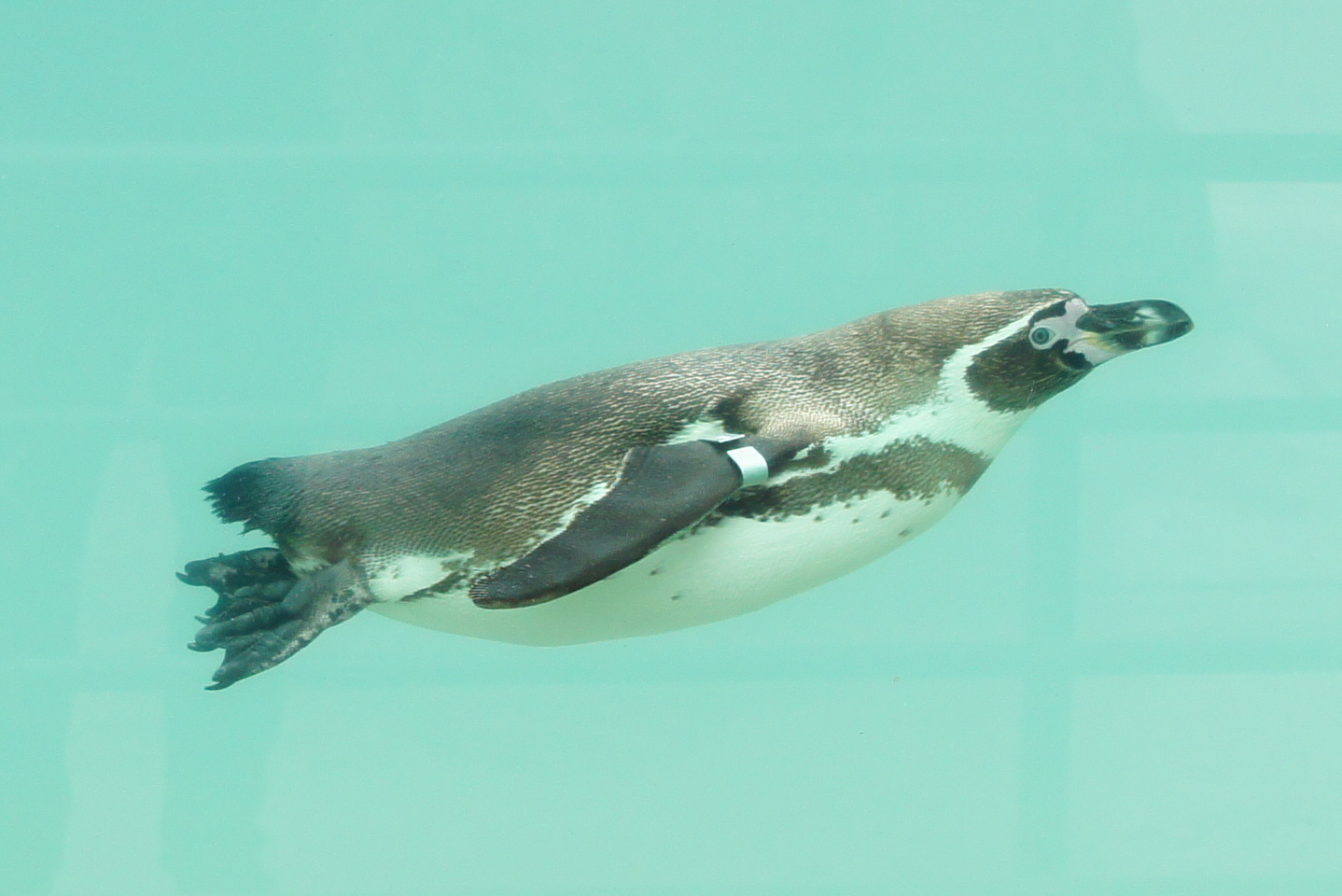
Swimming underwater, at the Parque de las Leyendas, Peru

The Humboldt penguin is a visual hunter. Humboldt penguins leave their islands for foraging after sunrise and different populations have different preferred foraging distances from the colony. Their foraging rhythm depends on the light intensity. They spend more time foraging during overnight trips. Fish are mostly seized from below through short, shallow dives.

The foraging range of Humboldt penguins is between 2 and 92 km (1.2 and 57.2 mi) from Pan de Azúcar, with 90% of the foraging being from a range of 35 km (22 mi) around the island and 50% from a range of 5 km (3.1 mi). The maximum depth reached is 54 m (177 ft).

Failed breeders take longer foraging trips with longer and deeper dives. They also dive less often than breeding penguins.

=== Courtship ===
During courtship, the Humboldt penguins bow their heads to each other and exchange mutual glances with each eye, alternatively. In the ecstatic display to attract a partner, the bird extends its head vertically, collapses its chest, flaps its wings and emits a loud call resembling the braying of a donkey. The mutual displaying consist of the pair standing side by side and repeating the actions of the ecstatic display.

=== Reproduction ===
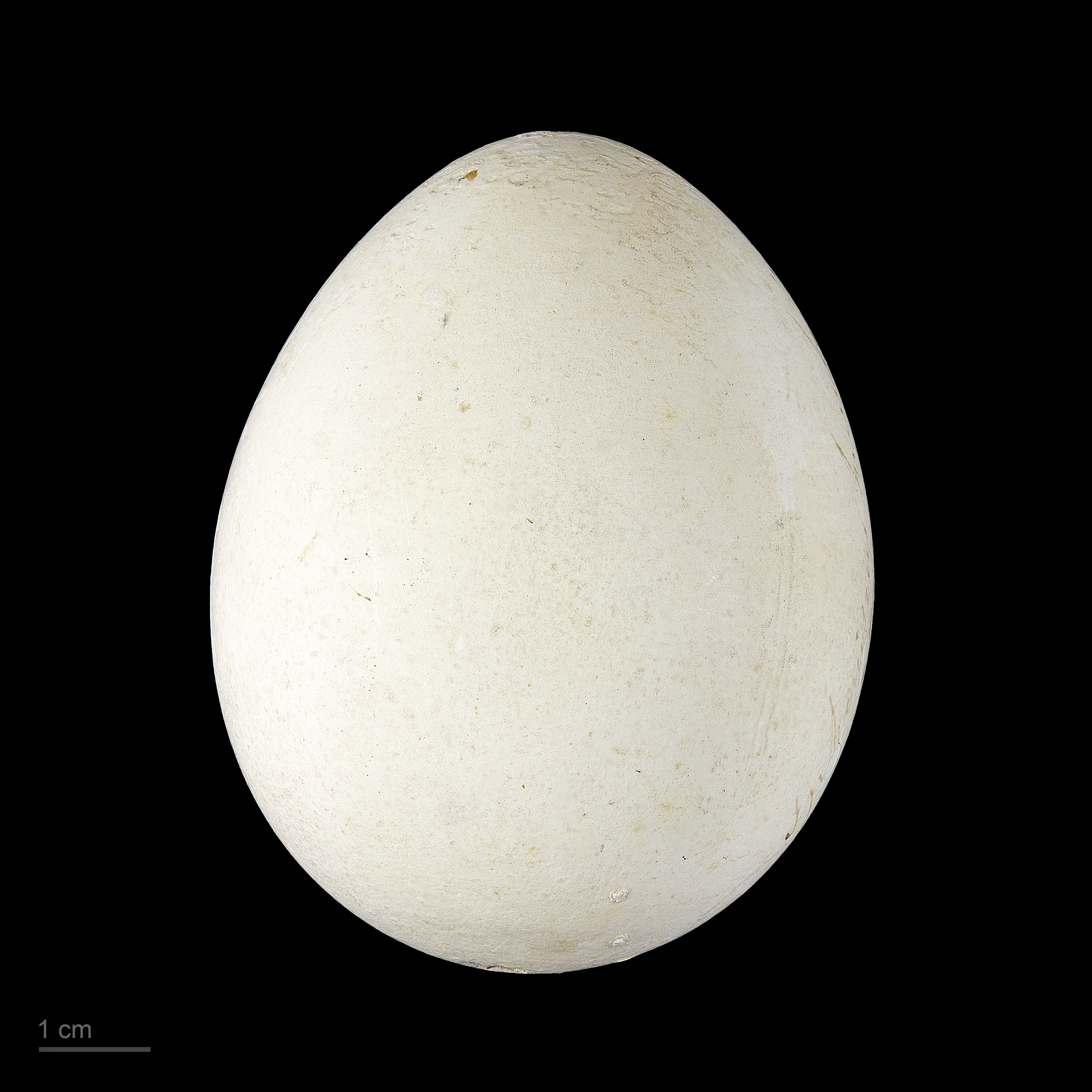
Egg, MHNT collection

The Humboldt penguin nests in loose colonies, with most pairs laying two eggs of the same size 4 days apart that require 41 days of incubation. Their breeding schedule is adjusted depending on the abundance of food. They breed immediately after moulting, when food is abundant and solar radiation is reduced.

The Humboldt penguin lay eggs from March to December, but also with peaks in April and August–September, due to individuals having a second clutch. Half of the females successfully have two clutches per year and most were double broods. If pairs lose their eggs during the first breeding season, they lay a new clutch within 1–4 months. The incubation shifts last, on average, 2.5 days, before one parent takes over and allows the other to forage. There are no differences in the contribution to provisioning from the male and female parents.

Chicks hatch generally 2 days apart. Chicks are semi-altricial and nidicolous and guarded by one parent while the other forages. Chicks are fed only once every day. Chicks are left unattended at the nest site after a certain age and both parents forage simultaneously.

=== Breeding sites ===
The historical breeding sites of this species are burrows on guano layers. Nests of the Humboldt penguin can also be found at caverns, hollows, cliff tops, beaches and scrapes covered by vegetation. They also nest at few Peruvian islands where true soil can be found for digging. The majority of penguins breed on cliff tops.

=== Migration ===
Humboldt penguins are sedentary during the breeding season, staying in proximity to their nests and show fidelity to breeding site. They can cover large distances, particularly in response to food shortages or changes in environmental conditions. They are a true migrant between Peru and Chile.

== Threats ==
=== El Niño-La Niña dynamics ===
The ecosystem of the Humboldt current is affected by the El Niño phenomenon. During the El Niño, upwelling of nutrient-rich bottom water in the south-eastern Pacific Ocean is depressed, as well as sea surface temperature anomaly (SSTA) value increases. Massive mortality, especially of juveniles, nest desertion and lack of reproduction occurs. Humboldt penguins migrate south as marine productivity decreases, following the anchovy stocks. Humboldt penguins expend more time and energy foraging as SSTA increases. By 2025 there are fewer than 500 Humboldt Penguins, first the Avian flu spread through the reserve. El Niño struck next which pushed the penguins main food source further out of reach in the deep parts of the ocean. Because of the intense weather changes a potential super El Niño is now on its way. This had the potential of disrupting the cold, fish-rich waters of the Humboldt Current. Messing with the temperatures of the water. According to scientist Cárdenas-Alayza she saw fewer numbers of penguins lining up on the cliffs for food and many abandoned nests with cold eggs.

=== Fisheries ===
The estimated energetic demands of the total Humboldt penguin population during breeding season sums up to 1,400 tons of fish. The Humboldt penguin depends on commercially exploited, schooling prey species including anchovies. This makes them susceptible to changes in prey availability due to overfishing. They are also susceptible to entanglement in fishing nets.

=== Human presence ===
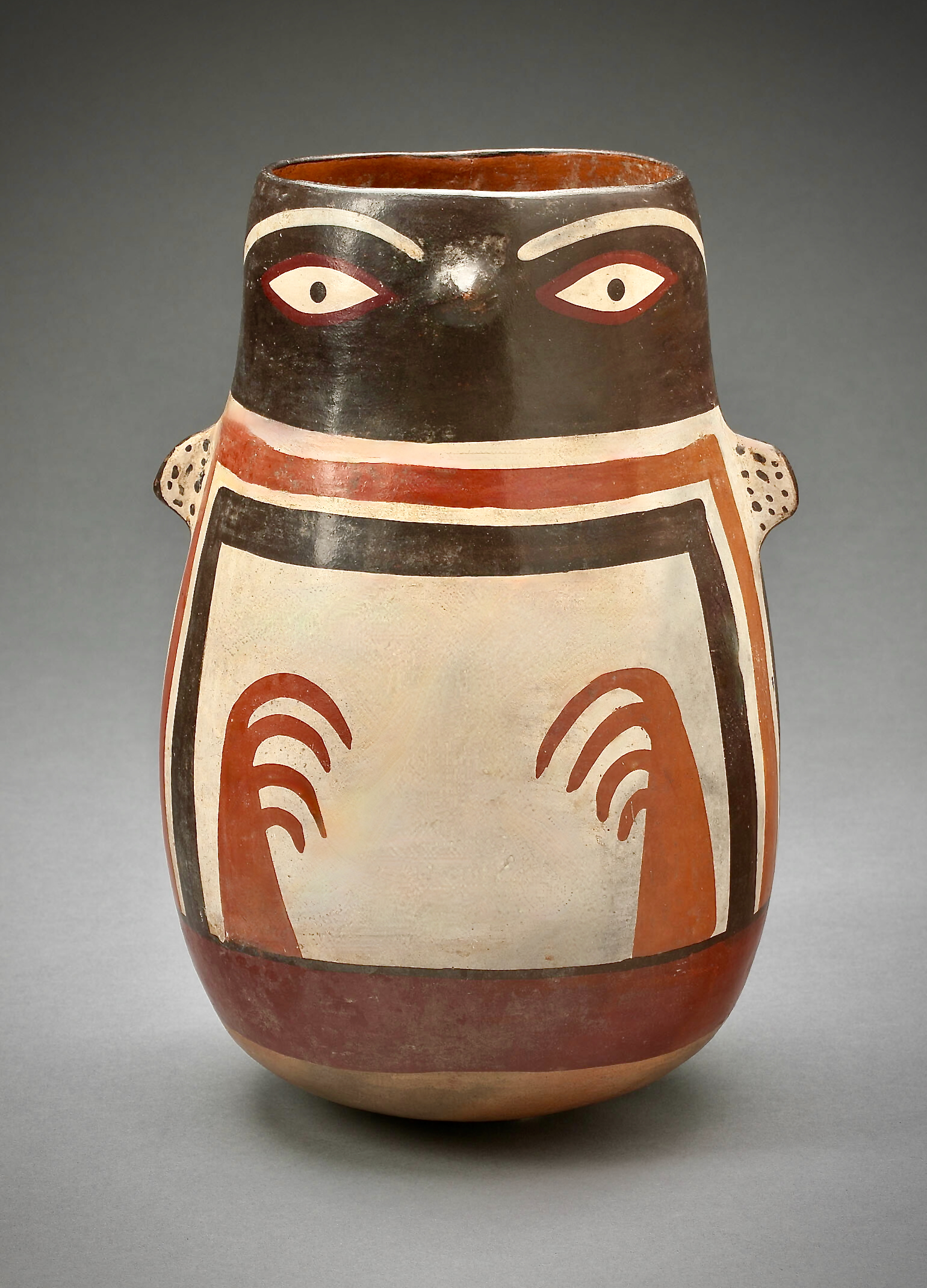
Nazca penguin effigy vessel, 350–500 CE, said to represent a Humboldt penguin by the Art Institute of Chicago

Humboldt penguins are extremely sensitive to human presence, with little habituation potential. Passing at a 150 m (490 ft) distance from an incubating Humboldt penguin provokes a response, which is the greatest response distance reported for penguins to date, making it the most timid penguin species so far studied. Humboldt penguins need up to half an hour to recover to normal heart rates after human approach, however, this time decreases with repeated visitation. Cumulative stress by frequent visits and delayed return of foraging partners leads to nest desertion, consequently causing decreased breeding success at frequently visited sites.

=== Habitat disturbance and feral species ===
The introduction of feral goats on the Puñihuil islands had a detrimental impact on the Humboldt penguin population. The feral goats browse the vegetation the penguins use to build their nests and they can lead to collapse to dirt burrows. The connection of the island to the mainland also led to the movements of mammals onto the island.

In central Chile, European rabbits and Norway rats graze on the vegetation. Norway rats and black rats also predate on eggs. Feral cats and dogs consume chicks, fledglings and adult Humboldt penguins.

=== Industrial development ===
Some Humboldt penguin colonies face emerging pressures from industrial development; the construction of coal-fired power plants and mining proposals in Chile. Peru's largest colony faces the prospect of a major new industrial port in close proximity to the country's largest colony, at Punta San Juan. Oil spills have previously impacted some colonies. The colony of 800 birds at Cachagua was exposed to two oil spill events in 2015–16. Oil spills related to port and shipping activities have impacted many species of penguins across the southern hemisphere.

In 2017, Andes Iron proposed to construct a mineral export port near the Humboldt Penguin National Reserve in Chile's Coquimbo region. The proposal was rejected on the grounds that the environmental impact would be unacceptable. The decision was welcomed by tour operators and environmentalists. Oceana was one of the non-governmental organisations lobbying for the rejection of the port proposal. Andes Iron challenged the decision, and environmental approval for the Dominga mine and Cruz Grande port project was eventually granted. Oceana has since challenged the proponents compliance at the work site and as of 2020 continues to lobby for the abandonment of the project and protection of region's rich marine biodiversity. If constructed, the Dominga complex will include an open pit copper mine, processing facility, desalination plant and port.

== History of population decline ==
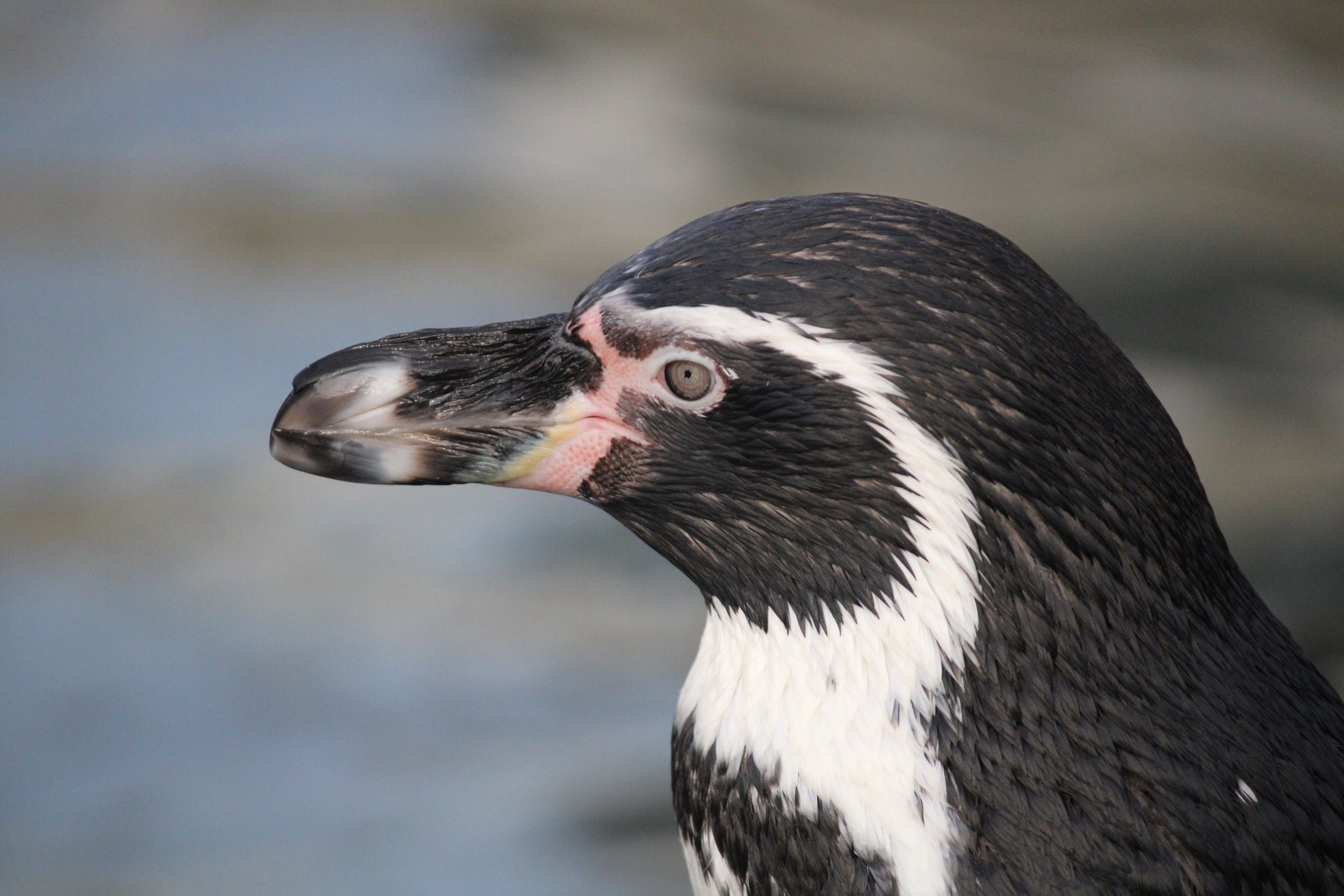
Head, close-up

=== Over-exploitation of guano ===
The historical breeding grounds for the Humboldt penguin were guano layers which covered islands of the Peruvian and Chilean coasts in which the birds could burrow. The guano, a rich fertilizer and source of income for the Peruvian Government, and eggs of the Humboldt penguin were regularly sought after. The birds were also frequently killed by fishermen and guano workers for their oil and skin. The decline of the Humboldt penguin population is attributed to the harvest of guano in the 1800s, which led to the destruction of breeding grounds and to human disturbance.

=== 1982–83 El Niño phenomenon ===
Before the 1982–83 El Niño event, the total number of individuals of Humboldt penguin individuals was estimated to be 20,000. The 1982–83 El Niño phenomenon led to a major decline in the Humboldt penguin population. The combination of an environment changed by human developments as well as the long duration and strong intensity of the event that year led to major effects on the fecundity and survival of the Humboldt penguins. The consequences were a 65% decline in the Humboldt penguin population, migration towards the south and the failure of the 1982 class of hatchlings. The surviving population in 1984 was estimated to be between 2,100 and 3,000 penguins and all were adults.

== Conservation ==
Humboldt penguins were given legal protection in 1977 by the Peruvian Government and listed in Appendix I of the Convention of International Trade of Endangered Species (CITES). Both Peru and Chile have implemented the CITES under national law. It is categorised as vulnerable due to extreme population size fluctuations, clustered distribution and the major threats to the species not being ameliorated over time. In August 2010 the Humboldt penguin of Chile and Peru, was granted protection under the U.S. Endangered Species Act. Most penguins breed within protected areas.

Peruvian legislation categorises the species as endangered and prohibits the hunting, possession, capture, transportation and export of the bird for commercial purposes. Chile implemented a 30-year hunting ban in 1995 forbidding hunting, transport, possession and commercialisation of penguins.

In 2017 a large mining project proposed by the company Andes Iron in Chile was vetoed due to the possible environmental impact on the penguins, though that decision was subsequently overturned.

As of August 2020, the species is listed as Vulnerable on the IUCN Red List, with a declining population of roughly 23,800 mature adults. Climate change, commercial overfishing of main prey species (sardines and anchovy) and bycatch in commercial and artisanal fisheries are all contributing factors in the species' decline. Rats, feral cats and dog attacks threaten some colonies. Historically, the Humboldt penguin population was impacted by the extraction of guano from their breeding colonies, which reduced the available habitat for burrowing and nesting.

== In captivity ==
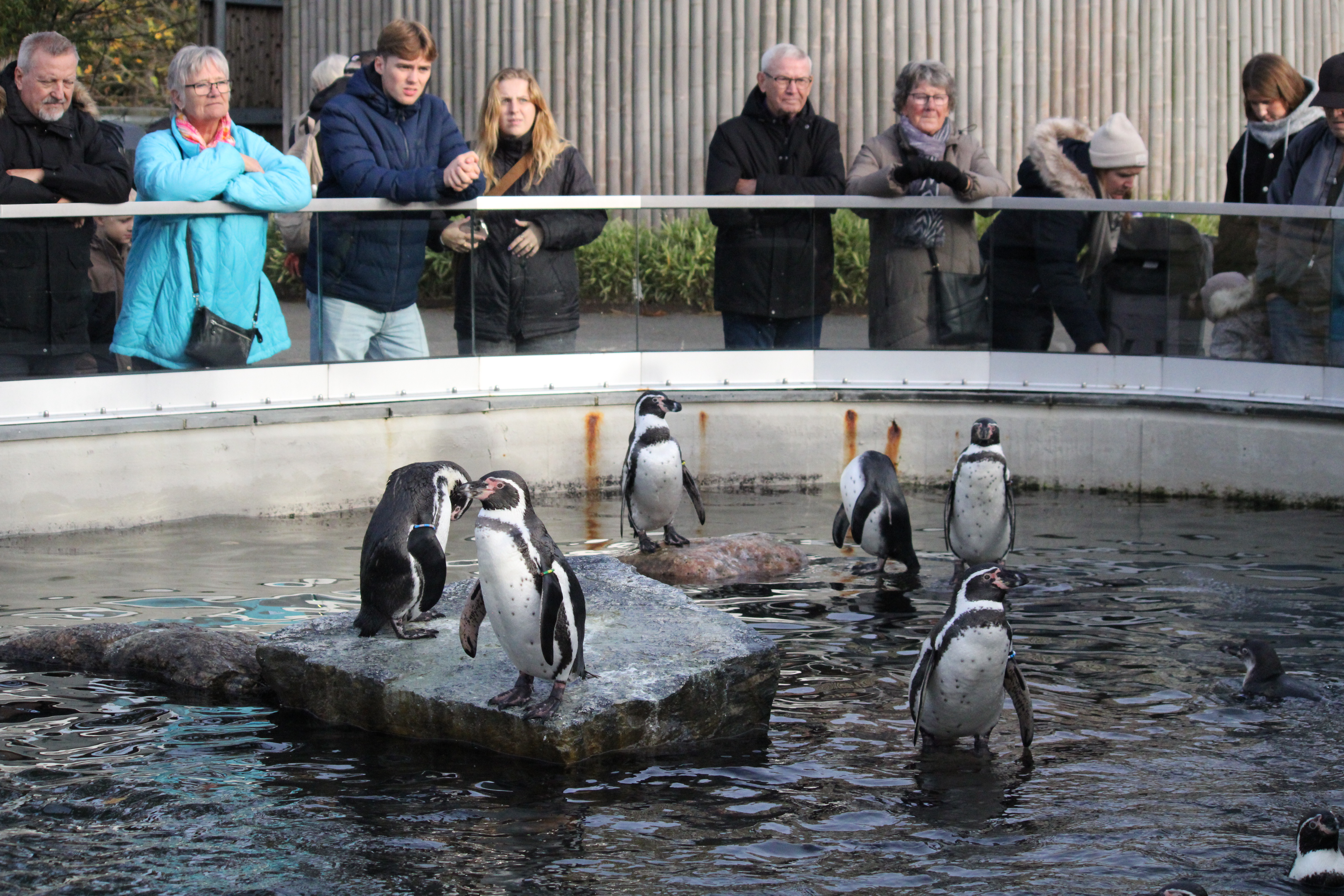
Humboldt penguins in Copenhagen Zoo, 2025

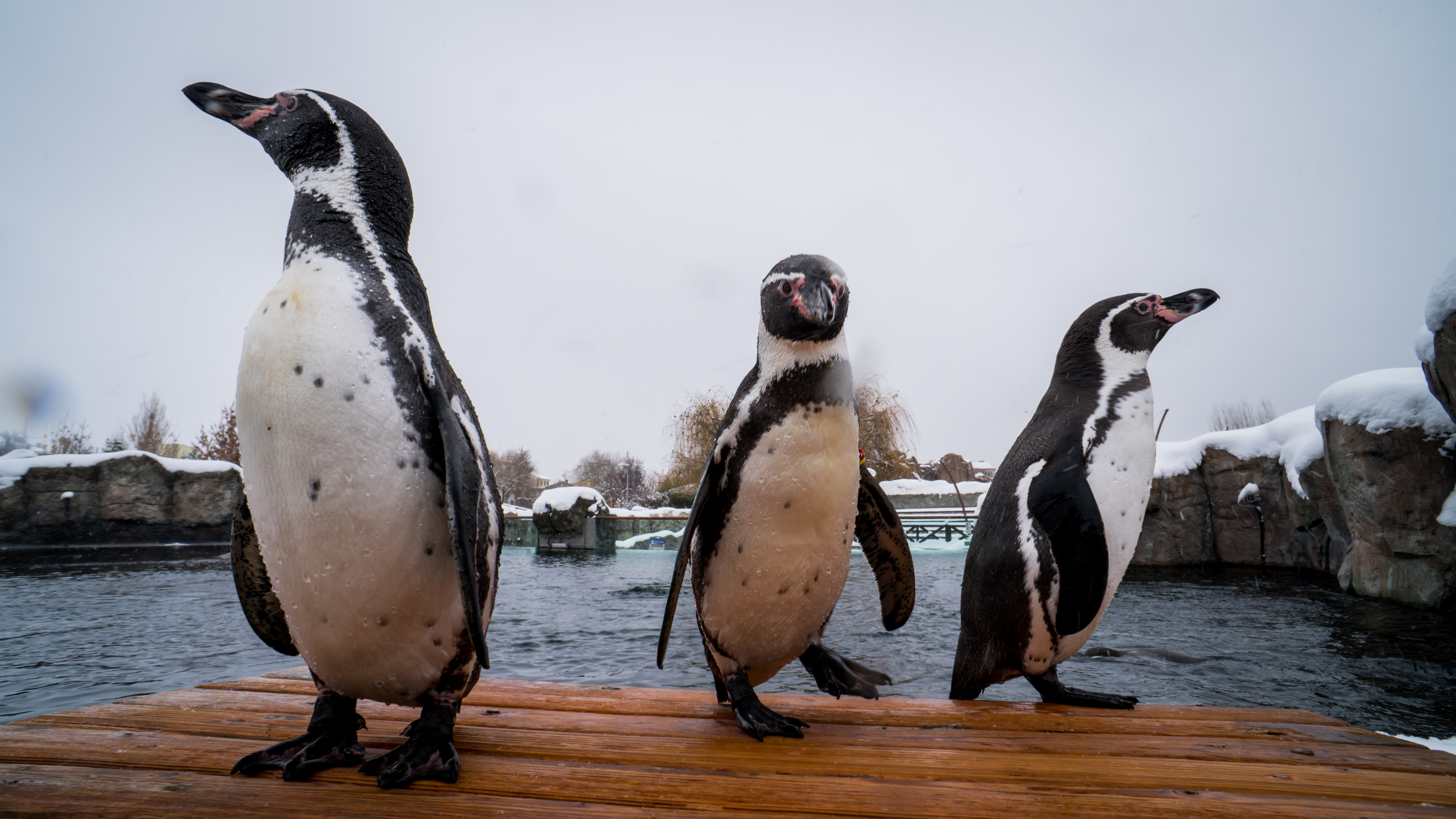
Humboldt penguin in Eskişehir Zoo, Turkey

In addition to their home waters near South America, Humboldt penguins can be found in zoos all around the world, including Spain, Germany, India, South Korea, Ireland, Japan, the United Kingdom, the United States and other locations.

=== Mr. Sea ===
The oldest penguin at Woodland Park Zoo and one of the oldest penguins in North America, Mr. Sea was euthanized after a decline in activity and appetite. He was 2 months short of his 32nd birthday. The average age for a Humbolt penguin that survives its first year is 17.6 years. He has 12 viable grandchicks, great-grandchicks, and great-great grandchicks.

=== Escape from Tokyo Zoo ===
One of the 135 Humboldt penguins from Tokyo Sea Life Park (Kasai Rinkai Suizokuen) lived in Tokyo Bay for 82 days after apparently scaling the 4-metre-high wall and managing to get through a barbed-wire fence into the bay. The penguin, known only by its number (337), was recaptured by the zoo keepers in late May 2012.

=== US discovery ===
In 1953, a Humboldt penguin was found in The Bronx, New York, US. It is not known whether the animal had escaped from a private collection or whether it was a vagrant but the local zoo's population was fully accounted for.

=== Same-sex raising of young ===
In 2009 at the Bremerhaven Zoo in Germany, two adult male Humboldt penguins adopted an egg that had been abandoned by its biological parents. After the egg hatched, the two penguins raised, protected, cared for, and fed the chick in the same manner that heterosexual penguin couples raise their own offspring. A further example of this kind of behavior came in 2014, when Jumbs and Kermit, two Humboldt Penguins at Wingham Wildlife Park, became the center of international media attention as two males who had pair bonded a number of years earlier and then successfully hatched and reared an egg given to them as surrogate parents after the mother abandoned it halfway through incubation.

== Gallery of captive animals ==
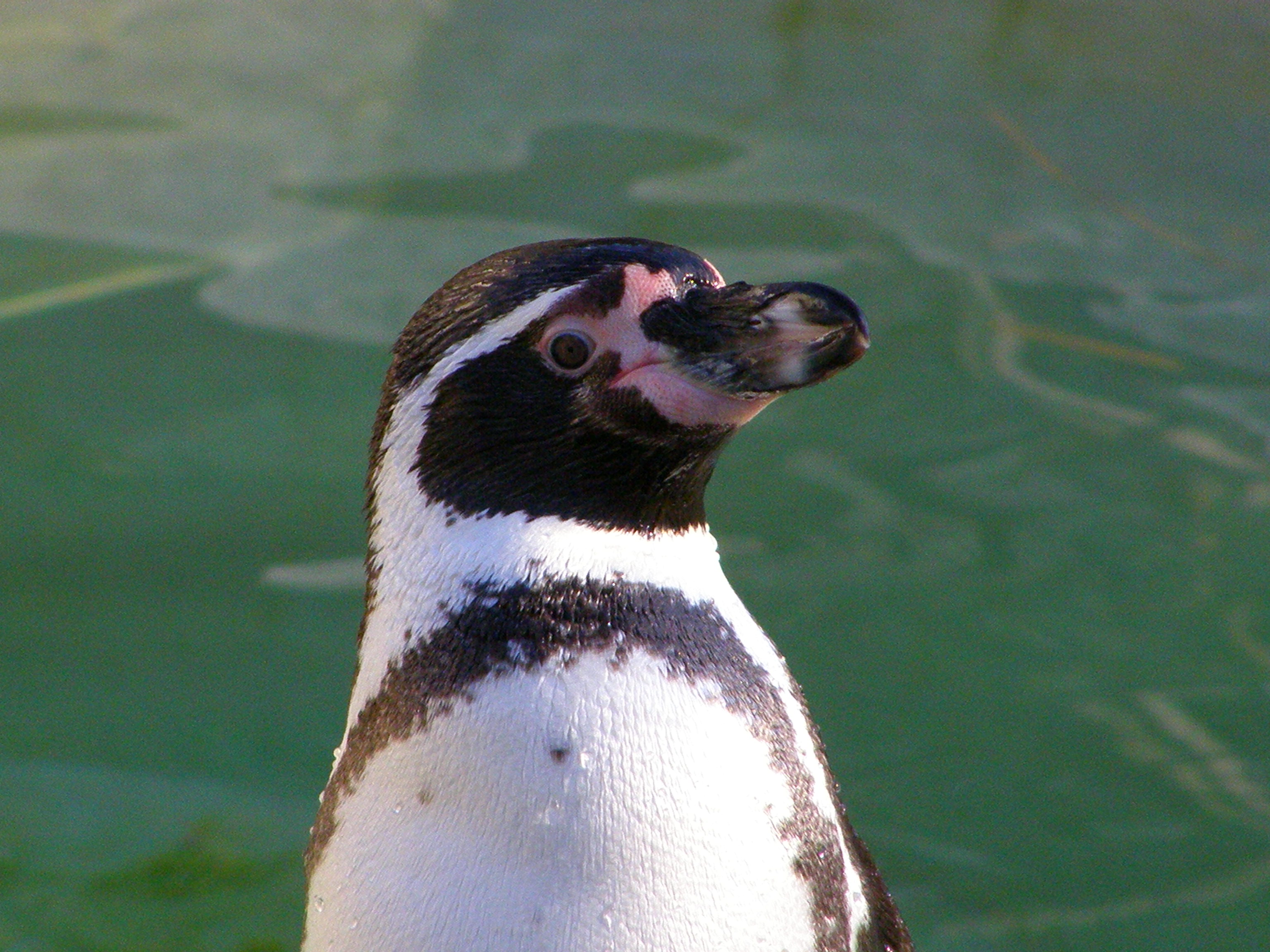
Upper body

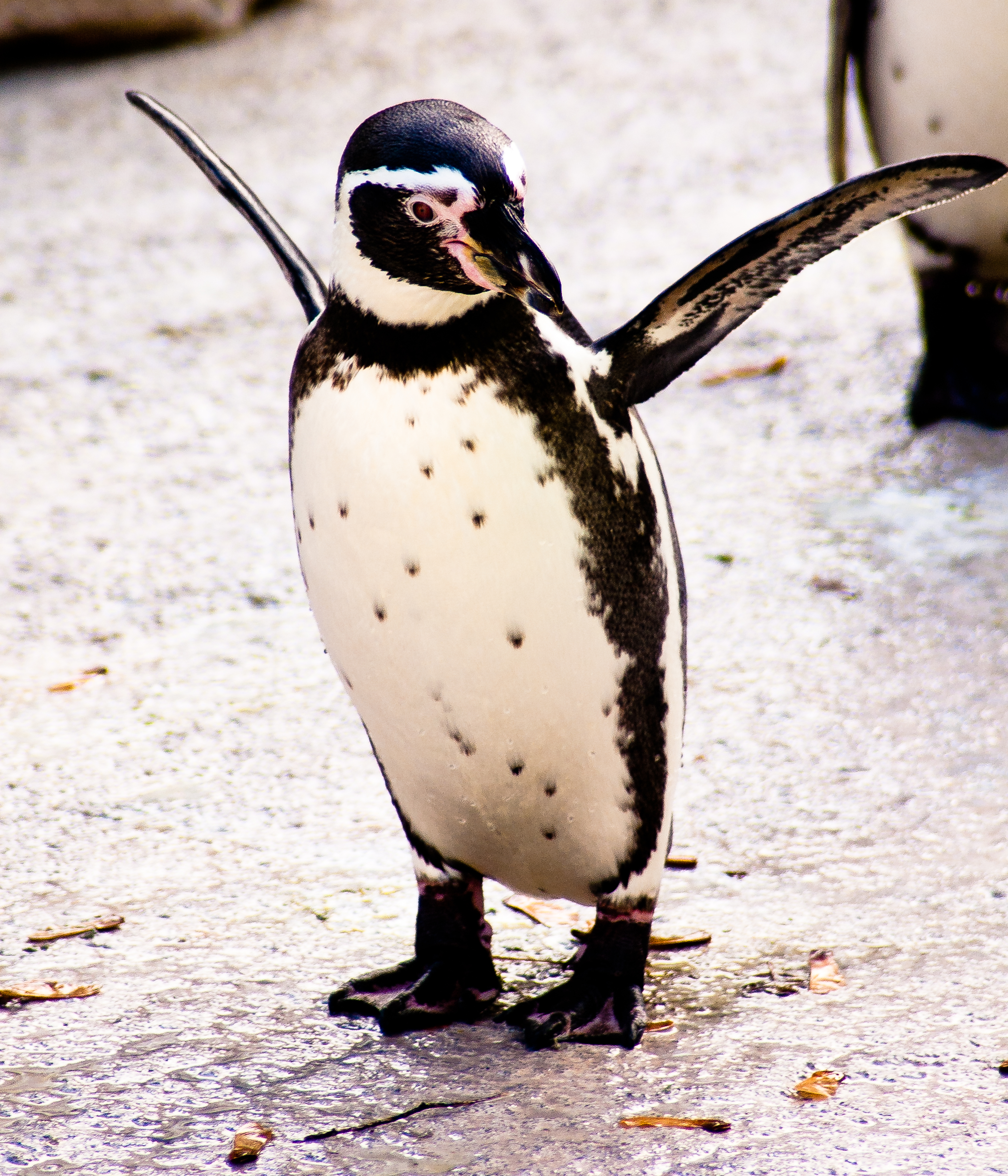
Humboldt penguin at Newquay Zoo

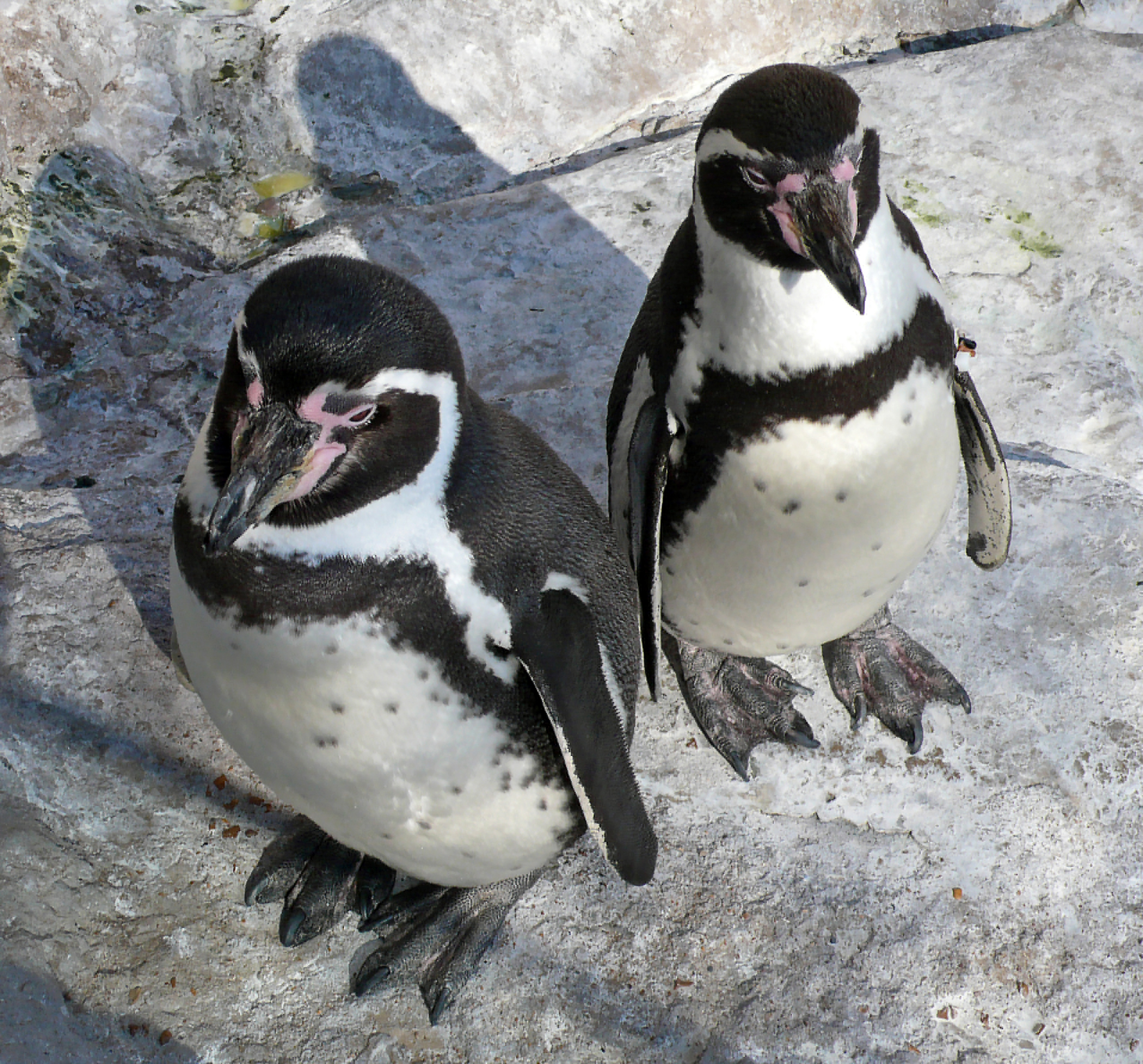
St Louis Zoo

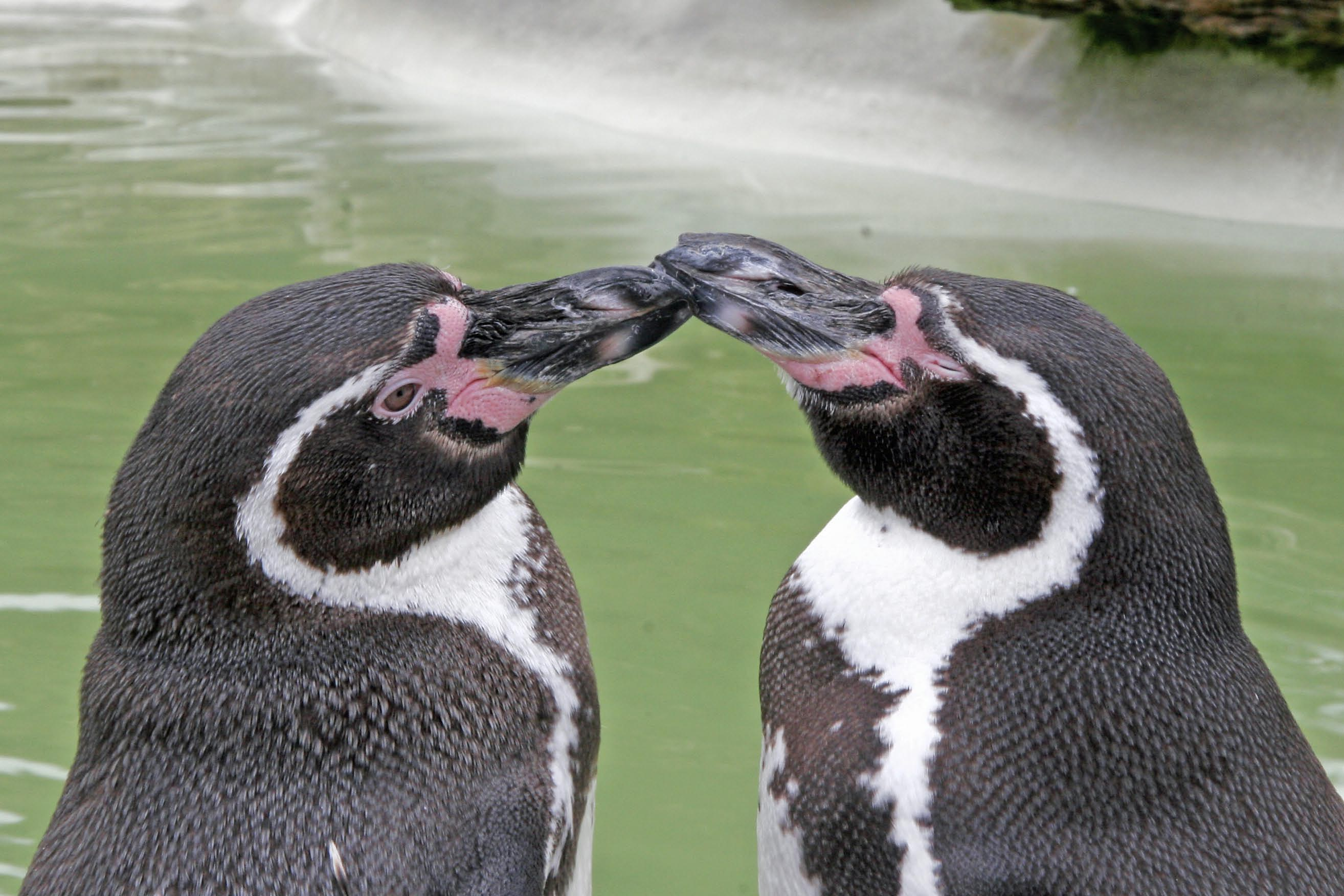
A pair "kissing" at Cotswold Wildlife Park

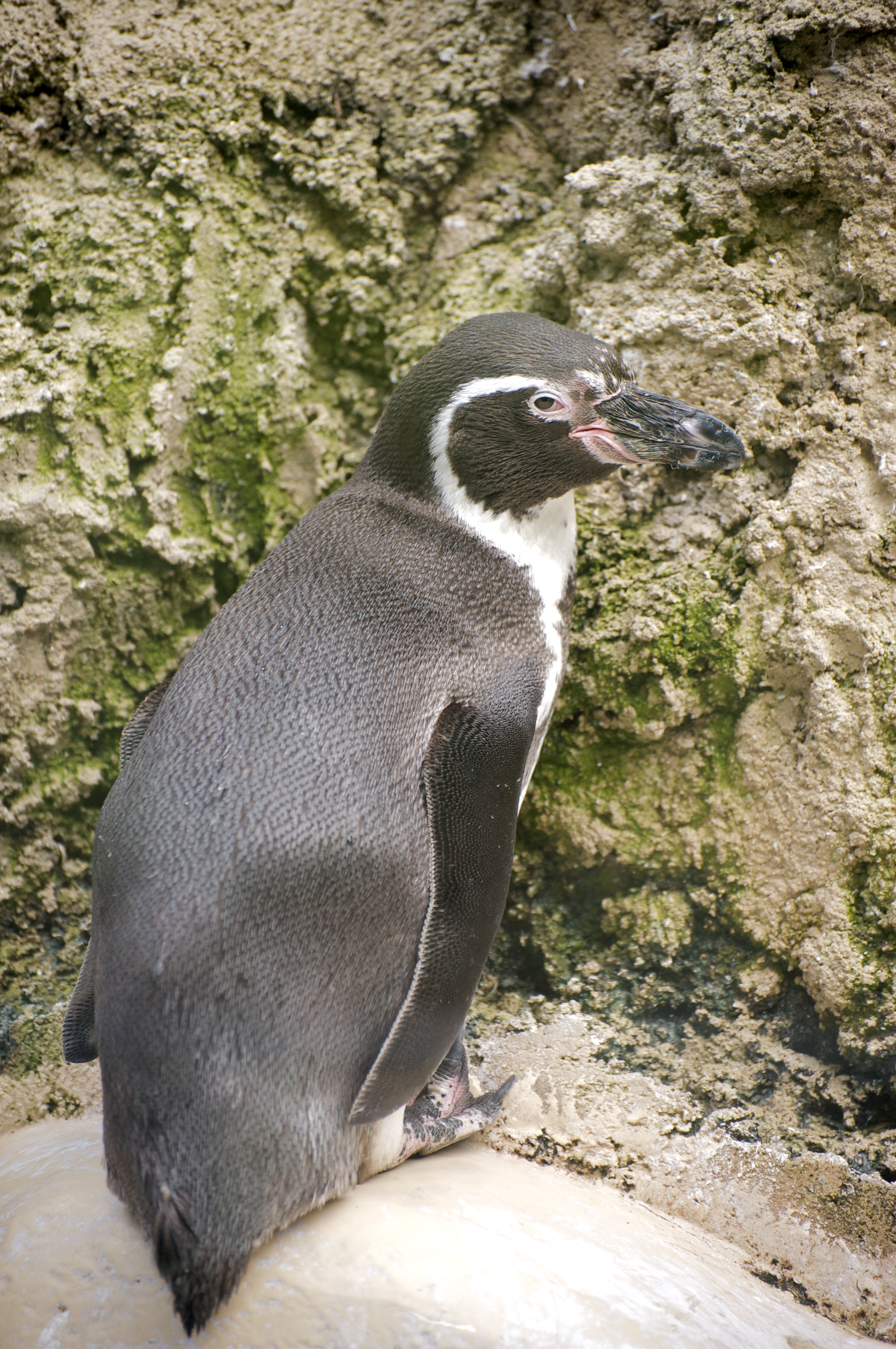
Back

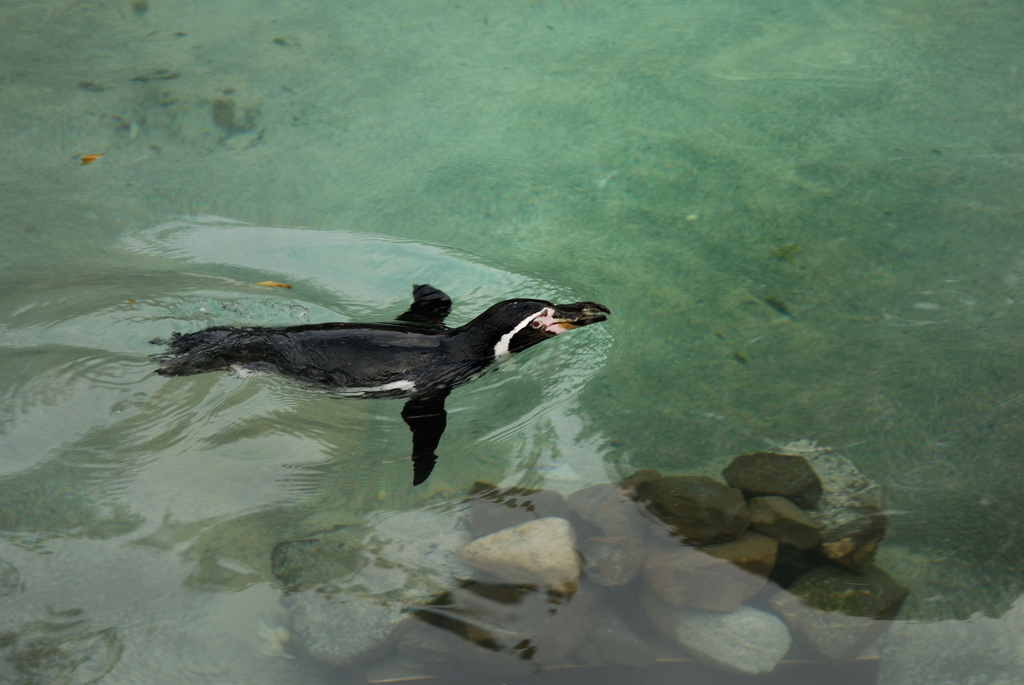
At the Dublin Zoo

Humboldt penguin underwater at the Bremerhaven Zoo, Germany

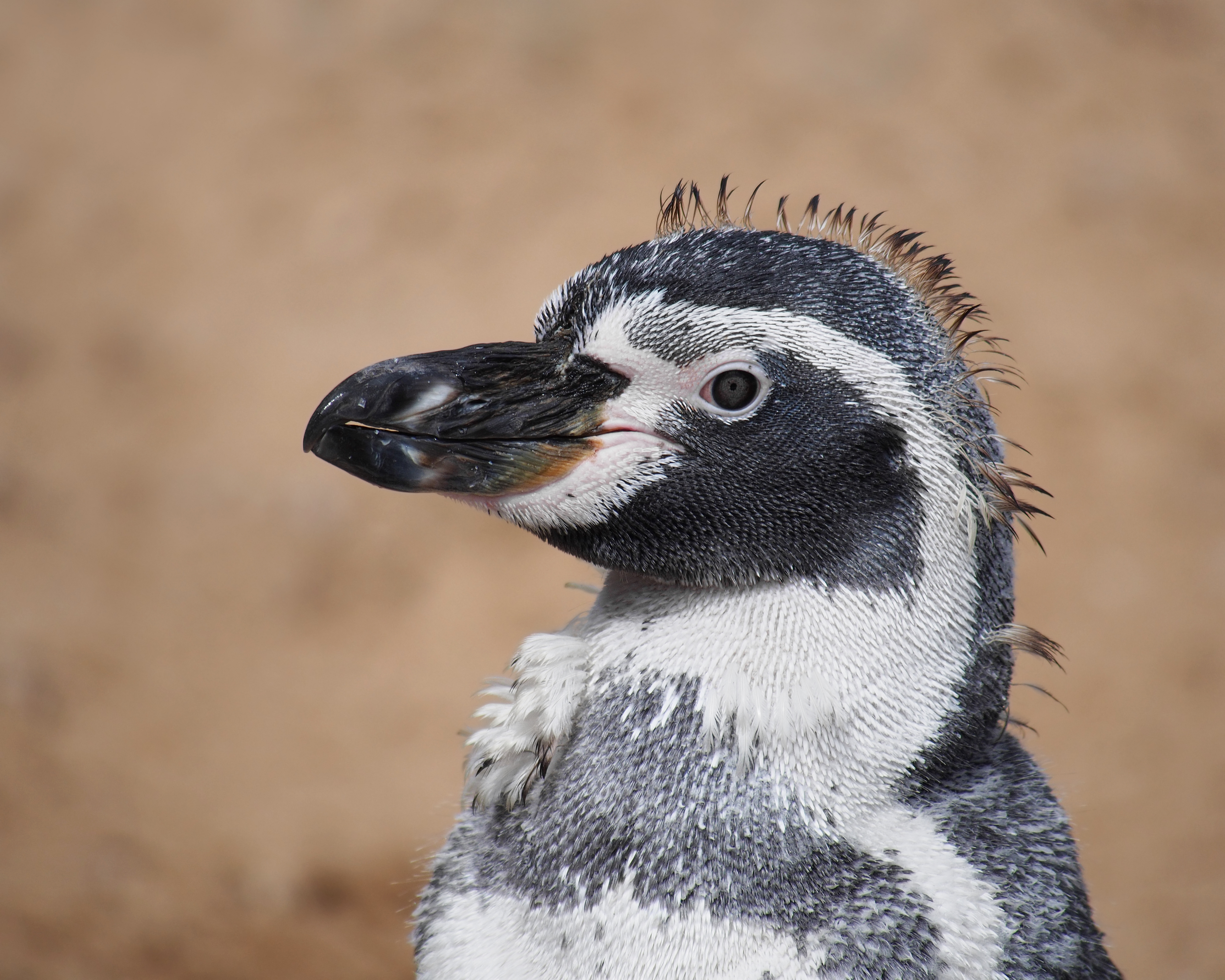
Humboldt penguin during moult at the Cornish Seal Sanctuary

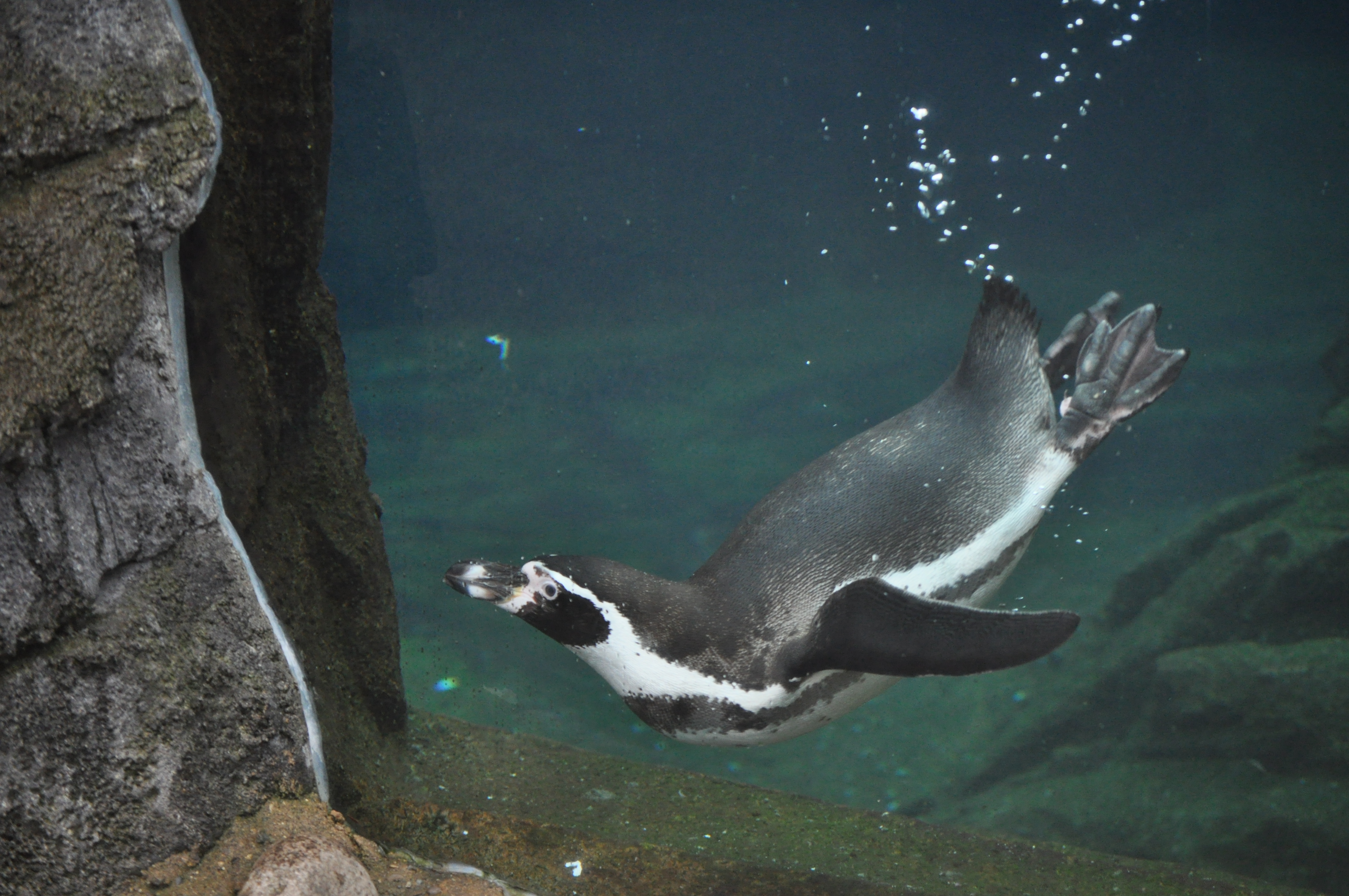
At the Woodland Park Zoo

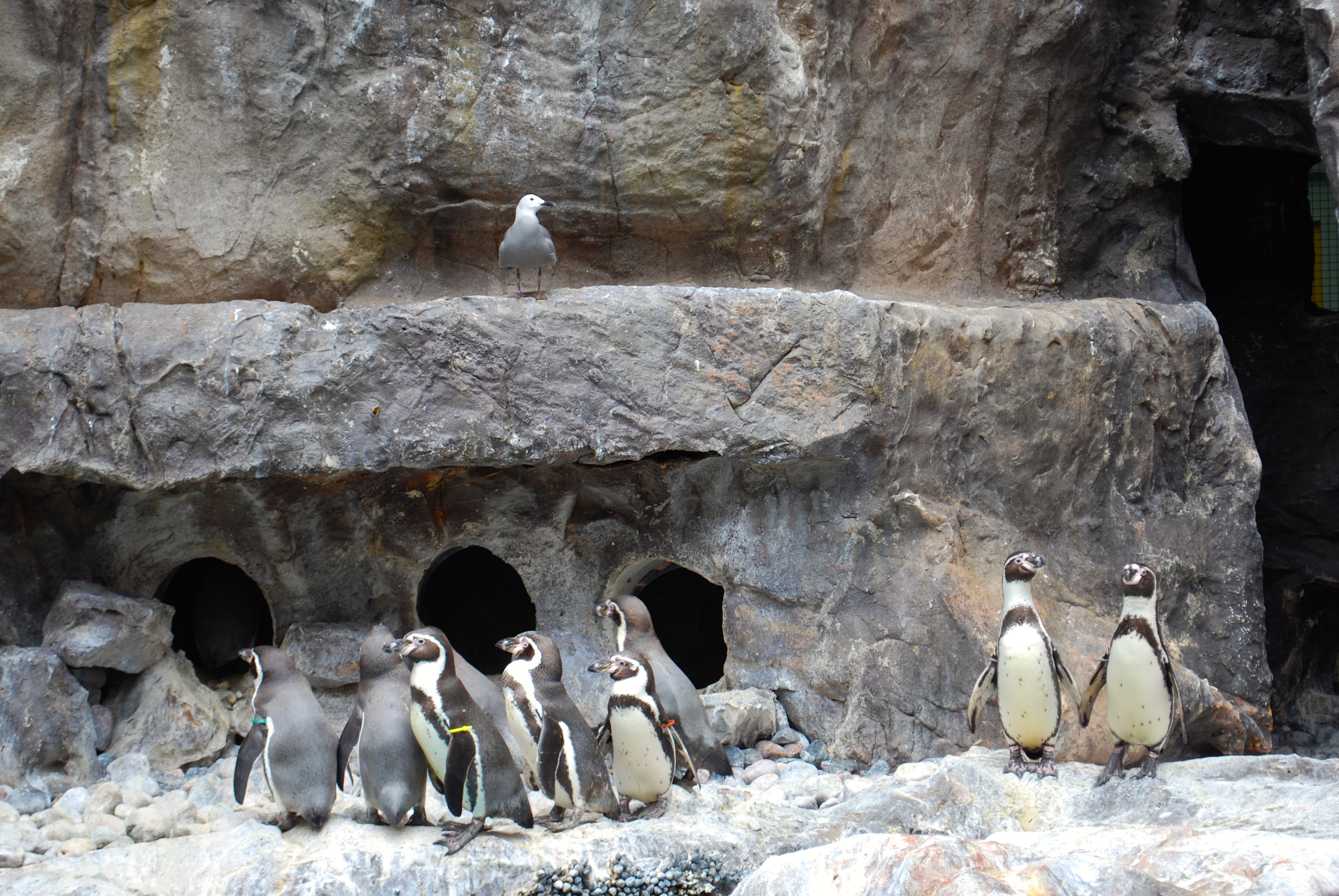
In captivity at Brookfield Zoo

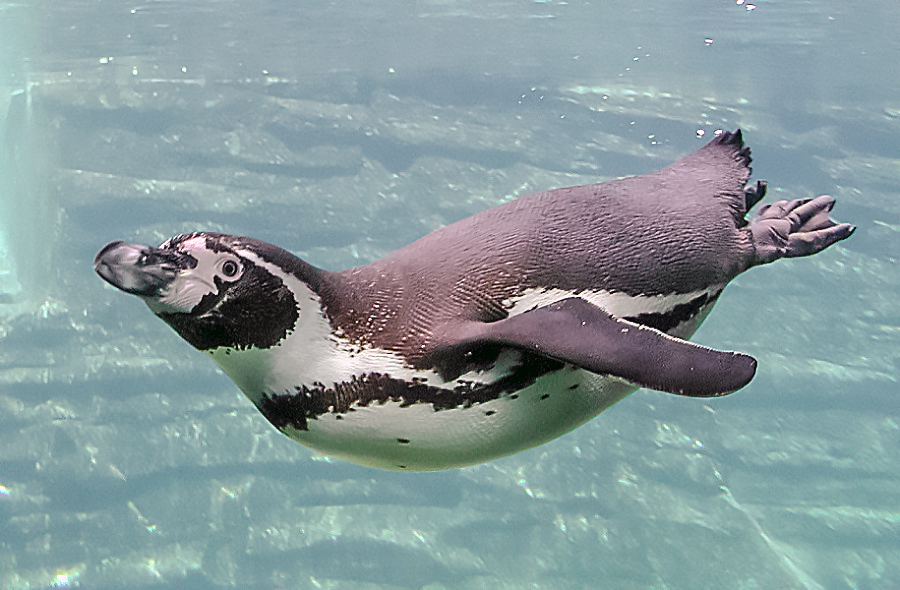
Underwater
