= Tenavatähti =

Finnish singing talent show

Tenavatähti (Finnish for "kid star") was a Finnish television singing competition for children. It was broadcast on Mainostelevisio (later MTV3) from 1990 to 1995 and was hosted by Seppo Hovi.

== Famous contestants ==
- Konsta Hietanen, footballer
- Karoliina Kallio, singer
- Sofia Sida, singer
