= Bakemono (film) =

Japanese horror monster movie

- Directed by: Doug Roos
- Written by: Doug Roos
- Produced by: Doug Roos
- Starring: Takashi Irie; Dominic Early; Marilyn Kawakami; Yukina Takase
- Cinematography: Doug Roos
- Edited by: Doug Roos
- Music by: Doug Roos
- Production company: Lost Forever Productions
- Distributed by: Midori Impuls
- Release date: December 9, 2023
- Running time: 101 minutes
- Country: Japan
- Language: Japanese

Bakemono is a 2023 Japanese horror film, written and directed by Doug Roos. It stars Takashi Irie as the proprietor of a cheap Tokyo airbnb.

== Plot ==
A number of visitors frequent the same Airbnb apartment in Tokyo at different times without realizing a gruesome monster is waiting for them.

== Cast ==
- Takashi Irie as Mitsuo
- Dominic Early as Chris
- Marilyn Kawakami as Anna
- Yukina Takase as Tomoko

== Production ==
The film was shot on location for over 80 days in Tokyo with all practical effects and no computer-generated imagery (CGI) inspired largely by The Thing.

== Release ==
Bakemono premiered at Another Hole in the Head Film Festival in San Francisco at the 4 Star Theater on December 9th, 2023. It will be released on German DVD/Blu-ray Mediabook from Midori Impuls while an English-subtitled Blu-ray is available on crowdfunding sites.

== Reception ==
Brendan Jesus of HorrorPress.com called the film "one of the most compelling creature features of the last 20 years" while adding that it is "rich with atmosphere, blood, and an unsettling score." HorrorDNA.com rated it 3.5 out of 5, saying "whether you check out Bakemono for the goopy practical FX and monster madness or the underlying social critique, you're in for a gory treat that comes at you in an unconventional way and leaves a mark." Anton Bitel at ProjectedFigures.com wrote that it has "astonishing practical effects" and an "unnerving score." Nicolas Kirks at HorrorBuzz.com gave it 7 out of 10, describing it as "suspenseful and funny when it wants to be." Darren Lucas at Movie Reviews 101 noted that the monster is "one of the most disturbing creatures you will see this year. The movie never holds back and leaves you shocked by everything you experienced."

=== Awards ===
Festival awards
Festival	Award
Another Hole in the Head Film Festival	Best Creature Feature
A Night of Horror Film Festival	Best Practical Effects
Bay of Blood Film Festival	Best Beast
Bare Bones Film Festival	Best Foreign Origin Feature
Japan Film Fest Hamburg	Best Genre Production
