= Girideva Raaj =

Indian director, screenwriter (born 1989)

- Born: 27 December 1989 (age 36); Hassan, Karnataka India
- Occupations: Film director; screenwriter
- Years active: 2016–present
- Spouse: Manasa Girideva (m. 2018)
- Children: 1

Girideva Raaj (born 27 December 1989) is an Indian film director and screenwriter working in Kannada and Hindi cinema. He made his directorial debut with the Kannada-language film ZERO Made in India (2016) and later directed the Hindi-language psychological horror film The Y (2023).

== Career ==
=== Early career ===
Raaj began his career in the Kannada film industry and made his directorial debut with ZERO Made in India (2016).

== Reception ==
The Y received mixed reviews from critics. The Times of India noted the film's attempt to create a psychological horror atmosphere while commenting on its screenplay and narrative structure.

A review by Film Information described the story as conventional for the genre and stated that while the film had some effective moments, its screenplay and climax did not fully deliver.

== Filmography ==
Key
†	Denotes films that have not yet been released

=== Film credits ===
Year	Title	Director	Writer	Producer	Notes	Ref.
2016	ZERO Made in India	Yes	Yes	No		
2023	The Y	Yes	Yes	No		
