= Konsta Hietanen =

Finnish footballer and musician (born 1984)

Personal information
- Date of birth: 20 July 1984 (age 42)
- Place of birth: Lahti, Finland
- Height: 1.74 m (5 ft 8 1/2 in)
- Position: Midfielder

Team information
- Current team: FC Lahti

Senior career*
Years	Team	Apps	(Gls)
2006–2009	FC Lahti	91	(7)
2010–2011	MyPa-47	36	(1)
2012–2013	FC Lahti	57	(6)
- * Club domestic league appearances and goals as of 16 March 2023

Konsta Hietanen (born 20 July 1984) is a Finnish musician, actor, and former association football player.

In 1994 Hietanen participated in Tenavatähti, a Finnish television singing competition for children. He won the competition with the song "Daa-da daa-da". In 1998, he starred in a film Tommy and the Wildcat. He also had his own TV show Konstan koukkuja. In 2023, he starred in a slasher film Isle of Doom.
