= The Y (film) =

- Directed by: Girideva Raaj
- Written by: Girideva Raaj
- Produced by: Madhu GM Gowda, Dr. Ajith R
- Starring: Yuvan Hariharan, Leonilla D'Souza, Prithal Pawar, Kamal Ghimiray, Abhinava Kiran, Apsara
- Cinematography: Karthik Mallur
- Edited by: Vinod Basavaraj
- Music by: Christopher Jayson (score), Maru Brothers (song)
- Production company: Rocket Films
- Distributed by: Cinépolis
- Release date: 6 January 2023
- Running time: 110 minutes
- Country: India
- Language: Hindi

The Y is a 2023 Indian Hindi psychological horror film written and directed by Girideva Raaj and produced by Rocket Films.

The film stars Yuvan Hariharan, Leonilla D'Souza, Prithal Pawar, Kamal Ghimiray, Abhinava Kiran and Apsara in lead roles. The film was released on 6 January 2023.

== Cast ==
- Yuvan Hariharan as Yuvan
- Leonilla D'Souza as Diksha
- Prithal Pawar as Sonu
- Abhinava Kiran as Abhi
- Kamal Ghimiray as Psychiatrist
- Apsara as Vidhya
- Bhairavi as Younger Diksha
- Bhuvan Brahmadev as Younger Yuvan

== Synopsis ==
The female lead unintentionally becomes silent. The couple starts a new chapter in their lives after her marriage, but they quickly run into a new issue. After receiving a present from an unidentified source, the protagonist encounters strange occurrences, and their ordinary lives become the subject of a mysterious tale. The intrigue of the movie is whether she is experiencing trauma as a result of her prior experiences or whether there is a spirit in the gift that has just arrived and how the two of them are able to solve the mystery.

== Reception ==
The film received mixed reviews from critics, with appreciation for its atmosphere and technical aspects, while some criticism was directed at the screenplay.

An ANI report published by ThePrint stated that the film ran to packed houses across the country in its second week.
