= Brian Vernel =

Scottish actor

- Education: Royal Conservatoire of Scotland
- Occupation: Actor
- Known for: Dunkirk (2017); Star Wars: The Force Awakens (2015); The Last Kingdom (2015)

Brian Vernel is a Scottish actor best known for his film role as Bala-Tik in Star Wars: The Force Awakens (2015), as Odda the Younger in the TV series The Last Kingdom (2015), and Billy Wallace in British gangster series Gangs of London (2020-).

== Early life ==
A native of Glasgow, Vernel attended St Mungo's Academy in Gallowgate before training at the Royal Conservatoire of Scotland (formerly the Royal Scottish Academy of Music and Drama) after a one-year general arts foundation course at Glasgow University.

== Career ==
He played the role of Bala-Tik in the 2015 film Star Wars: The Force Awakens. Vernel's character spoke in a Glaswegian accent.

Vernel played the main role of Billy Wallace, junkie brother of London drug cartel boss Sean Wallace, played by Joe Cole, and working alongside Michelle Fairley, who played his mother, in Gangs of London, between 2020-2022.

== Filmography ==
=== Movies ===
Year	Title	Role
2008	The Sound of Music - St Mungo’s Acdemy Adaptation	Captain Van Trapp
2012	Offender	Genghis
2014	Let Us Prey	Caesar Sargison
2015	Star Wars: The Force Awakens	Bala-Tik
2017	Dunkirk	Highlander 1
2017	Papillon	Guittou
2023	Betrayal	John
2026	The Odyssey	Irus

=== Television ===
Year	Title	Role	Notes
2011	The Field of Blood	Darren Naismith / Kevin McCorkhill	3 Episodes
2014	Prey	Dale Lomax	3 Episodes
2014	Grantchester	Tam	3 Episodes
2015	The Casual Vacancy	Stuart 'Fats' Wall	Mini-series
2015	The Last Kingdom	Odda the Younger	7 Episodes
2016	The Missing	Young Adam Gettrick	1 Episode
2017	Doctor Who	Lucius	S10 Episode 10: "The Eaters of Light"
2017	The Tunnel	Anton Stokes	5 Episodes
2018	Collateral	Mikey Gowans	3 episodes
2020–present	Gangs of London	Billy Wallace	24 episodes
2022	Slow Horses	Curly	5 episodes
2024	Shardlake	Brother Mortimus	4 episodes

== Stage ==
- The Seagull (2017) playing Konstantin at the Lyric Theatre (Hammersmith)
- Barbarians (2015) playing Paul at the Young Vic
- Future Conditional (2015) at the Old Vic
- The Static (2012) playing Sparky at the Underbelly, Edinburgh - Nominated for Best Actor The Stage Awards for Acting Excellence at the Edinburgh Fringe
- Macbeth (2012) playing Macbeth at the Royal Conservatoire of Scotland
