= Ranua Resort =

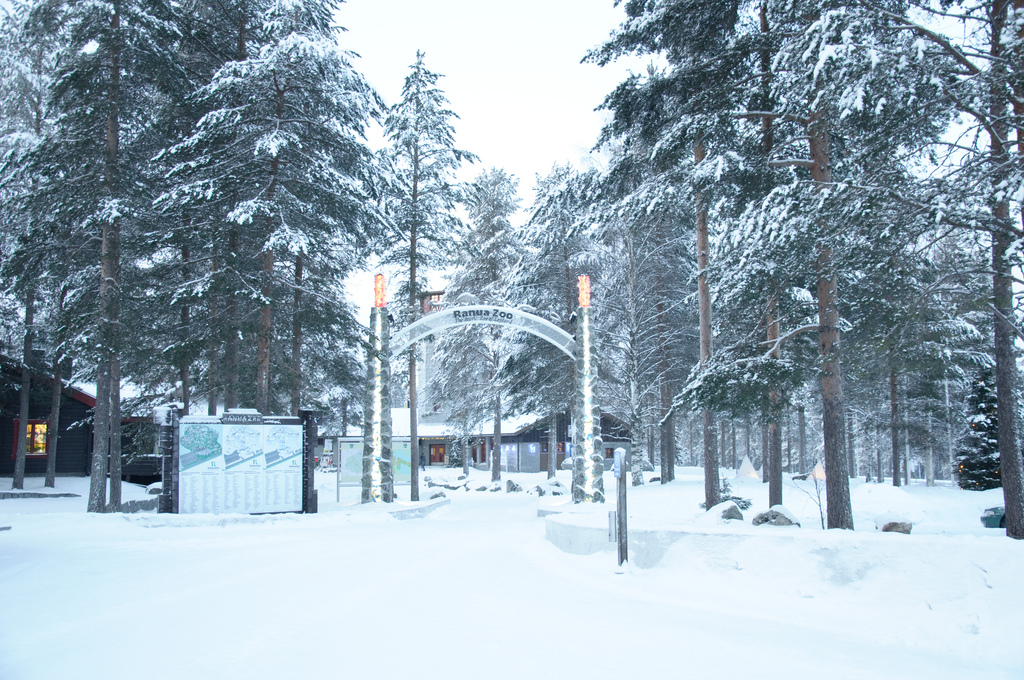
- Zoo entrance
- Interactive map of Ranua Resort
- 65°56′32″N 026°28′06″E
- Date opened: 1983
- Location: Ranua, Lapland, Finland
- No. of animals: 150
- No. of species: 50
- Memberships: EAZA
- Owner: Ranuan Seudun Matkailu Oy
- Website: https://ranuaresort.com/

Ranua Resort (better known as Ranua Zoo or Ranua Wildlife Park) is a wildlife park and a holiday resort that opened in 1983 in the municipality of Ranua, Lapland, Finland. It is the northernmost zoo in Finland and the second northeast in the world.

The animals of the wildlife park consist of approximately 50 arctic animal species and 150 individuals, including top predators such as lynx, brown bears and wolves but also European moose and deer. The wildlife park has Finland's only polar bears. The wildlife park is an accredited member of the European Association of Zoos and Aquaria (EAZA).

In addition to the wildlife park, Ranua Resort also offers accommodation, a restaurant, and a variety of activities such as snowmobiling, husky safaris and other outdoor experiences. Ranua Resort is open every day year round.

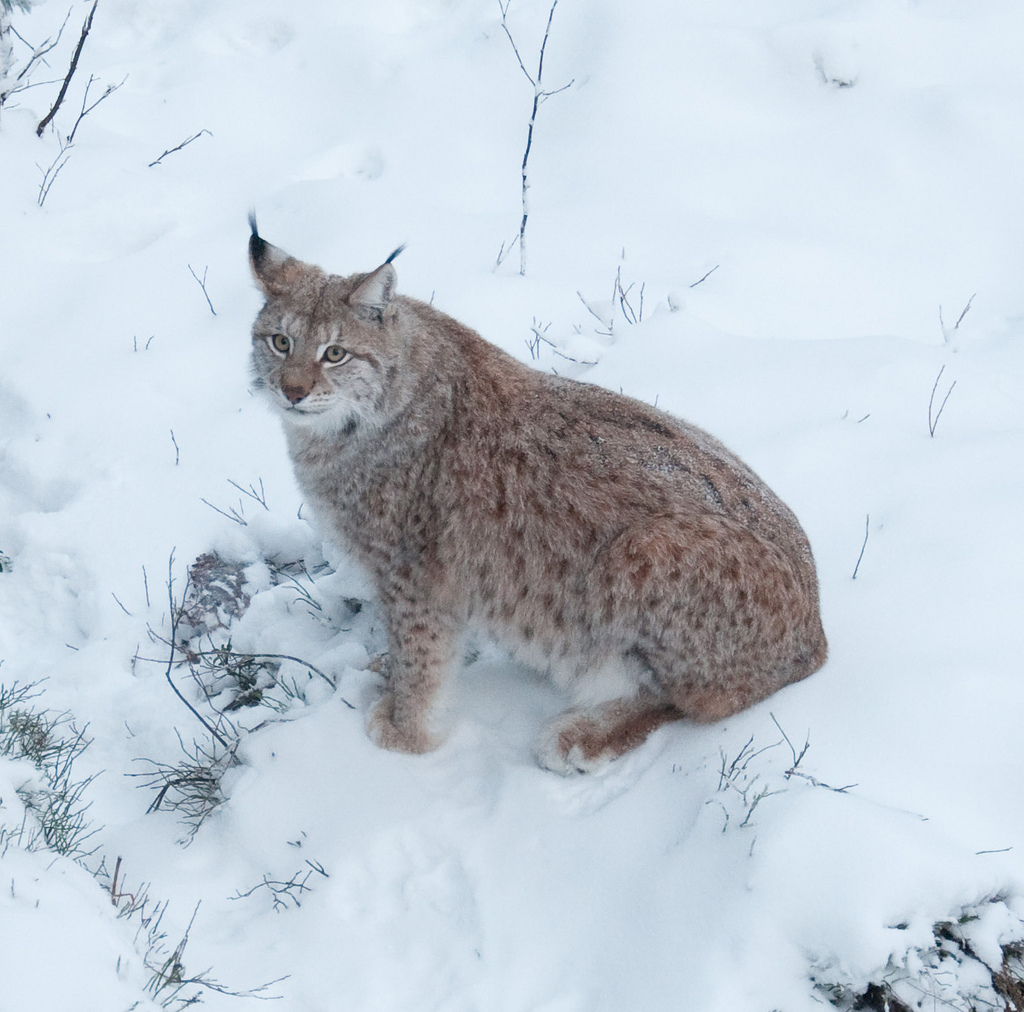
A Eurasian lynx at Ranua Zoo
