= Cogwheel (disambiguation) =

A cogwheel is a type of gear.

Cogwheel, Cogwheels or Cogwheeling may also refer to:

- Cogwheel rigidity, or cogwheeling, a sign of hypokinesia
- Cogwheel diagram, a type of Venn diagram
- Cogwheels, a 1927 book by Ryūnosuke Akutagawa

== See also ==
- Cog (disambiguation)
- Rack railway, or rack-and-pinion railway, cog railway, or cogwheel railway
- System Settings, an application included with macOS
- Settings (Windows), a component of Microsoft Windows
