= Cog =

A cog is a tooth of a gear or cogwheel or the gear itself.

Cog, COG, CoG, or The Cog may also refer to:

== Science and engineering ==
- Rear sprocket of a bicycle
- Cog (ship), a type of sailboat from the 10th century onward
- Center of gravity, a spatial point related to an object's center of mass
- Cluster of Orthologous Groups of proteins; see Sequence homology and MicrobesOnline
- Conserved oligomeric Golgi complex, that includes COG2, COG4, etc.
- INSEE code (also code officiel géographique), a numerical indexing code used by the French National Institute for Statistics and Economic Studies
- Mount Washington Cog Railway, the world's first mountain-climbing cog railway
- OpenCog, a project that aims to build an open source artificial general intelligence framework
- Chip on Glass; see Liquid-crystal display

== Entertainment and media ==
- C.O.G., a 2013 American drama
- C.O.G. (2025 film), an American science fiction horror film
- "The Changing of the Guard" (The Twilight Zone), a 1962 episode of the TV series The Twilight Zone
- "Cog" (advertisement), a British television and cinema advertisement launched by Honda
- Star Wars Jedi Quest 8: The Changing of the Guard, the eighth book in the Star Wars Jedi Quest series by Jude Watson
- COG, a 2020 novel by Greg van Eekhout
- "C.O.G." (2025 film), film directed by Tommy Savas

=== Fictional characters ===
- Coalition of Ordered Governments, a fictional organization from the Gears of War series
- Cogs, the fictional antagonists in the MMORPG Toontown Online
- Cogs, the fictional foot soldiers of Power Rangers' Machine Empire
- Cog (comics), a character from the Spawn comics

=== Music ===
- Cog (band), an Australian progressive rock band
- "Changing of the Guards", a single from Bob Dylan's 1978 album Street-Legal
- The Changing of the Guard (album), 2010 album by indie rock band Starflyer 59
- "Change of the Guard", a song from Steely Dan's 1972 album Can't Buy a Thrill
- "Changing of the Guard", a song from Exodus' 1990 album Impact Is Imminent

== Organizations ==
- Canberra Ornithologists Group, an Australian ornithological organization
- Children's Oncology Group, a National Cancer Institute supported clinical trials group
- Church of God (disambiguation), a name used by numerous, mostly unrelated Christian denominational bodies
- Council of Government (disambiguation), various government bodies
- Council of governments, regional bodies that exist throughout the United States
- Covenant of the Goddess, a cross-traditional Wiccan group
- The ISO 3166-1 alpha-3 country code for Republic of the Congo

== Other uses ==
- Cog (software), an open source audio player for macOS
- Cog (project), a project at the Humanoid Robotics Group of the Massachusetts Institute of Technology
- Continuity of government, defined procedures that allow a government to continue its essential operations in case of catastrophe
- Changing of the Guard (or Guard Mounting), a formal ceremony in which sentries are relieved by their replacements
- Course over ground, the actual path followed by a vessel from A to B as determined by its course
- Cloud Optimized GeoTIFF, standard to make use of partial data in GeoTIFF image files

== See also ==
- Change of gauge (disambiguation), with various senses in the airline and rail industries
- C0G, an EIA Class 1 dielectric material with the lowest capacitance/temperature dependence
- CoG (disambiguation)
- COGS (disambiguation)
- Coq, in computer science, was the ancient name of Rocq, an interactive theorem prover
- Kog (disambiguation)
- System Settings, an application included with macOS
- Settings (Windows), a component of Microsoft Windows
