= Not Without Hope =

Nonfiction book

- First edition
- Author: Nick Schuyler and Jeré Longman
- Language: English
- Genre: Non-fiction; memoir
- Published: March 2, 2010 (William Morrow, an imprint of HarperCollins Publishers)
- Publication place: United States
- Media type: Print
- Pages: 256 pages (Hardcover edition)
- ISBN: 978-0061993992

Not Without Hope is a 2010 non-fiction book by Nick Schuyler and Jeré Longman. The book describes a 2009 boating accident that Schuyler survived while his three friends, including NFL players Marquis Cooper and Corey Smith, died. Not Without Hope was a New York Times best-seller.

== Summary ==
Not Without Hope describes a 2009 boating accident that took the lives of NFL players Marquis Cooper, Corey Smith and Schuyler's best friend Will Bleakley. Schuyler survived the incident. It was co-authored by Schuyler and Jeré Longman, a sports reporter and author of several sports related books.

== Film ==
A film version was released in 2025.

== See also ==
- Survivor guilt, to which Schuyler admits suffering
