= Joe Carnahan =

American film director (born 1969)

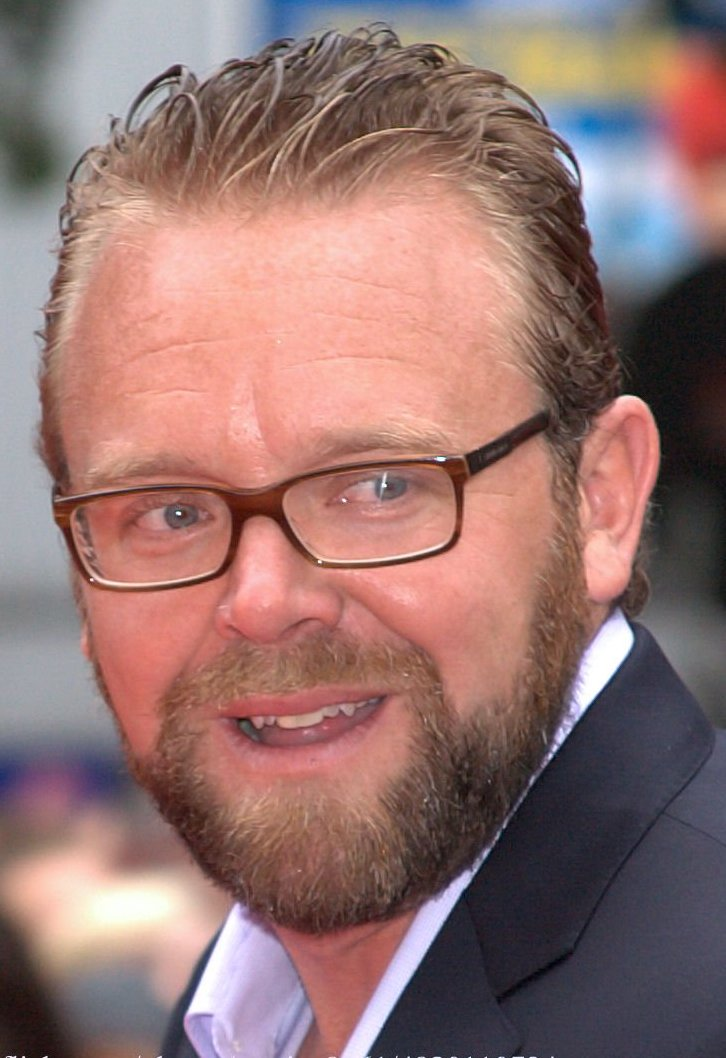
- Carnahan in 2010 at the A-Team film premiere
- Born: Joseph Aaron Carnahan; May 9, 1969 (age 57); Michigan, U.S.
- Education: Sacramento State University (BA)
- Occupations: Film director, screenwriter, producer
- Years active: 1995–present
- Spouses: Christy Leis; Lisa Carnahan
- Children: 4
- Relatives: Matthew Michael Carnahan (brother)

Joseph Aaron Carnahan (born May 9, 1969) is an American film director, screenwriter, producer and occasional actor whose films include Blood, Guts, Bullets and Octane, Narc, Smokin' Aces, The A-Team, The Grey, and Boss Level. He also wrote and directed several episodes for the NBC television series The Blacklist.

== Early life ==
Carnahan was born in Dover, Delaware and spent his childhood in Shepherd, Michigan. His parents moved to Fairfield, California when he was a teenager. Carnahan graduated from Fairfield High School in 1987. He attended college at San Francisco State University for one year, but later transferred to California State University, Sacramento, and earned his B.A. in Filmography there. Carnahan eventually became employed in the Promotional Department of Sacramento's KMAX-TV, producing short films and television spots.

== Career ==
Carnahan's film Blood, Guts, Bullets and Octane premiered in September 1997 at the Independent Feature Film Market, and later at the 1998 Sundance Film Festival.

He directed the 2002 Detroit-set thriller Narc, starring Ray Liotta and Jason Patric. Following Narc, he directed an entry in the BMW Films titled Ticker starring Clive Owen and Don Cheadle.

In 2004, Carnahan was solicited to direct Mission: Impossible III, produced by Tom Cruise and Paula Wagner, but he left the production due to conflicting views on the tone of the film with Cruise, saying "you’re dealing with… a big movie star whose involvement tends to shape creative outcomes". He was replaced by J. J. Abrams. It was also announced in October 2005 that Carnahan would be directing a film based on the life of convicted drug dealer Will Wright, but the project was abandoned.

His next film, Smokin' Aces, was released in 2007. He also co-wrote the screenplay of Pride and Glory.

He was attached to direct an adaptation of James Ellroy's novel White Jazz with George Clooney producing and starring, but Clooney later pulled out from the production and in 2009, Ellroy stated that all adaptations of the film were dead.

In 2007, Carnahan penned Remarkable Fellows for Universal with Jason Bateman set to star, but the film never went into production.

In 2010, Brian Bloom and Carnahan were then hired by Fox for the revamping of their long-gestating A-Team project, based on the hit '80's television series. He also showed interest in directing film adaptations for Garth Ennis' graphic novel Preacher and David Michelinie's Taskmaster.

In 2011, he directed the thriller The Grey, starring Liam Neeson.

Carnahan was one of the executive producers for NBC's The Blacklist, starring James Spader and Megan Boone, during its first season. He directed the pilot, and went on to co-write and direct the ninth episode, "Anslo Garrick". Carnahan also wrote the story for episode 16, "Mako Tanida".

Carnahan and his brother Matthew wrote a script adapting of the Mark Millar comic book series Nemesis for film in 2013. He had also been attached to direct an adaptation of Mark Bowden's book Killing Pablo.

Carnahan executive produced the NBC political thriller State of Affairs, starring Katherine Heigl and Alfre Woodard, which premiered November 17, 2014. He directed and co-wrote the pilot.

In 2013, The Hollywood Reporter reported on a profanity-laden email Carnahan sent to Metro-Goldwyn-Mayer and Miramax executive Jonathan Glickman after exiting the studio’s planned remake of Death Wish, which Carnahan had been attached to write and direct. Carnahan exited the film, which released in 2018, but was credited as writer.

In April 2022, Lionsgate Films revealed that Carnahan will direct Shadow Force, starring Kerry Washington and Omar Sy.

In June 2023, Carnahan began filming Not Without Hope, a survival thriller adapted from the non-fiction book by Nick Schuyler and Jeré Longman and starring Zachary Levi and Josh Duhamel. The film was released in 2025.

On June 18, 2024, it was announced that Carnahan would write and direct the crime thriller The Rip, starring Ben Affleck, who had previously worked with Carnahan on Smokin' Aces, and Matt Damon, with the project to be produced by Affleck and Damon's Artists Equity. On July 2, it was announced that the project had been acquired by Netflix. Production on the film began in October 2024. In 2026, the film became the subject of a defamation lawsuit filed by Miami-Dade Sheriff's Office police sergeants who claimed the film narrative too closely resembled details of their real 2016 drug-money seizure case and affected their professional reputations.

In February 2025, Caranahan announced he would partner with White Label Productions CEO Chris Wagner to form Gang of Three, a film production company.

== Controversies ==
Carnahan has drawn media attention over the course of his film career for public disputes within the Hollywood film industry. Carnahan has also been criticized for disparaging remarks directed at film critics and female journalists, including Deadline Hollywood founder Nikki Finke, as well as comments made on social media following mixed reviews of El Chicano in 2019, after which he deleted his Twitter account. In January 2026, during the press tour of the Netflix film The Rip that Carnahan directed, Carnahan was named in a civil lawsuit filed by his former partner who he dated until 2024, Michelle Crosby, who cited a "pattern of violence", alleging assault, sexual battery and stalking by Carnahan. Carnahan subsequently countersued Crosby.

== Filmography ==
=== Film ===
Year	Title	Director	Writer	Producer	Notes
1995	Karate Raider	No	Yes	No	
1998	Blood, Guts, Bullets and Octane	Yes	Yes	Yes	Also editor
2002	Narc	Yes	Yes	No	
2006	Smokin' Aces	Yes	Yes	No	
2008	Pride and Glory	No	Yes	No	
2010	The A-Team	Yes	Yes	No	
2011	The Grey	Yes	Yes	Yes	
2014	Stretch	Yes	Yes	Yes	Direct-to-video
2018	Death Wish	No	Yes	No	
2018	El Chicano	No	Yes	Yes	
2020	Bad Boys for Life	No	Yes	No	
2020	Boss Level	Yes	Yes	Yes	
2021	Copshop	Yes	Yes	Yes	
2025	Shadow Force	Yes	Yes	No	
2025	Not Without Hope	Yes	Yes	Yes	
2026	The Rip	Yes	Yes	No	

Producer only

- The Fourth Kind (2009)
- Wheelman (2017)
- Point Blank (2019)

Associate producer

- The Devil Takes a Holiday (1996)

Executive producer

- Smokin' Aces 2: Assassins' Ball (2010) (Also story writer)
- Into the Ashes (2019)

Acting roles

Year	Title	Role	Notes
1998	Blood, Guts, Bullets and Octane	Sid French	
2010	The A-Team	Mike 'The Operator'	Credited as "Bo Anzo"
2018	El Chicano	Role: Federal #1	
2020	Boss Level	Guy in diner	Uncredited

=== Short films ===
Year	Title	Director	Writer	Producer	Notes
1998	Taco Heaven	No	Yes	No	
2000	Nail in My Coffin	No	No	No	Editor
2002	Ticker	Yes	Yes	No	Segment from the BMW short film series The Hire
2003	Boyz Up Unauthorized	No	No	Executive	
2009	Susannah	No	No	Yes	
2011	The Devil's Dosh	No	No	Executive	

=== Television ===
Year	Title	Director	Producer	Writer	Notes
2006	Faceless	Yes	Yes	No	Unsold TV pilot
2013	Dino and Dash	No	Executive	No	Television film
2013	The Blacklist	Yes	No	Yes	
2014	Those Who Kill	Yes	No	No	
2014	State of Affairs	Yes	Yes	Yes	

=== Frequent collaborators ===
Collaborator	Narc	Smokin' Aces	The A-Team	The Grey	Stretch	Boss Level	Copshop	The Rip	Total
Ben Affleck		Yes						Yes	2
Roger Barton			Yes	Yes					2
Brian Bloom		Yes	Yes						2
James Badge Dale				Yes	Yes				2
Mauro Fiore		Yes	Yes						2
Frank Grillo				Yes		Yes	Yes		3
Christopher Michael Holley		Yes			Yes				2
Quinton Jackson			Yes			Yes			2
Ray Liotta	Yes	Yes			Yes				3
Liam Neeson			Yes	Yes					2
Chris Pine		Yes			Yes				2
Ridley Scott			Yes	Yes					2
Maury Sterling		Yes	Yes						2
Patrick Wilson			Yes		Yes				2
