= Not Without Hope (film) =

- Theatrical release poster
- Directed by: Joe Carnahan
- Screenplay by: E. Nicholas Mariani; Joe Carnahan
- Based on: Not Without Hope by: Nick Schuyler; Jeré Longman
- Produced by: Joe Carnahan; Michael Jefferson; Adam Beasley; Cindy Bru; Kia Jam; Dean Altit; Rick French; David Lipper; Robert A. Daly Jr.; Alla Belaya; Vadim Fortunin; Jean-Pierre Magro
- Starring: Zachary Levi; Quentin Plair; Terrence Terrell; Marshall Cook; Jessica Blackmore; JoBeth Williams; Floriana Lima; Josh Duhamel
- Cinematography: Juan Miguel Azpiroz
- Edited by: Kevin Hale
- Music by: Clinton Shorter
- Production companies: Volition Media; K. Jam Media; Altit Media Group; Prix Productions; Latigo Films
- Distributed by: Inaugural Entertainment
- Release dates: October 25, 2025 (Austin Film Festival); December 12, 2025 (United States)
- Running time: 121 minutes
- Countries: United States; Malta
- Language: English
- Budget: $18 million
- Box office: $231,571

Not Without Hope is a 2025 survival thriller film directed by Joe Carnahan and starring Zachary Levi as Nick Schuyler, the real-life sole survivor of a 2009 boating accident that took the lives of NFL football players Marquis Cooper and Corey Smith as well as Will Bleakley. The screenplay was written by E. Nicholas Mariani and Joe Carnahan and is based on Schuyler and Jeré Longman's 2010 nonfiction book of the same title.

The film premiered at Austin Film Festival on October 25, 2025, and was released in theaters on December 12.

== Cast ==
- Zachary Levi as Nick Schuyler
- Josh Duhamel as Timothy Close
- JoBeth Williams as Marcia
- Quentin Plair as Marquis Cooper
- Terrence Terrell as Corey Smith
- Marshall Cook as Will Bleakley
- Floriana Lima as Paula
- Jessica Blackmore as Rebekah Cooper
- Priya Jain as Lieutenant
- Logan Kellogg as Ship Captain

== Production ==
In November 2013, Dwayne Johnson was cast to star as Nick Schuyler in Not Without Hope, for Relativity Media. The film fell into development hell until June 2020 when Miles Teller was cast as Schuyler, with Rupert Wainwright directing and E. Nicholas Mariani writing the screenplay. Filming was scheduled to begin in the Dominican Republic in August 2020 until Wainwright abruptly left the project due to creative differences. Teller left the project due to production delays that were caused by the COVID-19 pandemic.

In February 2023, Zachary Levi signed on to replace Teller while Joe Carnahan would direct the film. In June 2023, the rest of the cast was announced.

Filming occurred in Malta in June 2023. The film was shot entirely in Malta.

Principal photography wrapped in Malta in June 2023, prior to the 2023 SAG-AFTRA strike.

== Release ==
Not Without Hope was released in the United States on December 12, 2025.

== Reception ==
On the review aggregator website Rotten Tomatoes, 71% of 14 critics' reviews are positive.

Richard Roeper, writing for RogerEbert.com, awarded the film three stars out of four. Luna Guthrie of Collider gave the film a 7 out of 10.

William Bibbiani of TheWrap gave the film a positive review and wrote that it "never completely comes together but when it works, it's absorbing disaster filmmaking."
