= C.O.G. (2025 film) =

2025 film directed by Tommy Savas

- Theatrical release poster
- Directed by: Tommy Savas
- Written by: Angie Simms
- Produced by: Judy Craig; Kelly May; Tommy Savas; Angie Simms
- Starring: Piper Curda; Josh Zuckerman; Noel Fisher
- Cinematography: Azariah Bjørvig
- Edited by: Patrick Lawrence
- Music by: Ben Van Vlissingen
- Production companies: Reckless Content; Reckless Tortuga Productions; Bridge & Tunnel Films
- Distributed by: Brainstorm Media
- Release dates: August 21, 2025 (FrightFest); September 4, 2026 (United States)
- Running time: 84 minutes
- Country: United States
- Language: English

C.O.G. (previously titled as CognAItive) is a 2025 sci-fi horror thriller film directed by Tommy Savas starring Piper Curda, Josh Zuckerman, and Noel Fisher.

== Premise ==
After ambitious CEO Ethan moves up the launch date for the AI chatbot "cognAItive" to the next day, Kaya and her team must work through the night to finalize the tool.

== Cast ==
- Piper Curda as Kaya
- Josh Zuckerman as Wes
- Noel Fisher as Ethan
- Ritesh Rajan as KJ
- Lucius Baybak as Jude
- Natasha Behnam as Liza
- Kyle S. More as Daryl

== Production ==
Tommy Savas and Angie Simms came up with the idea of developing a film on this subject due to the 2023 Writers Guild of America strike. Piper Curda, Noel Fisher and Josh Zuckerman were announced as part of the film's cast in March 2024.

== Release ==
The film premiered at FrightFest on August 21, 2025.

It was released by Brainstorm Media in select theaters on September 4, 2026, and was followed by a digital release on September 25, 2026.

== Reception ==
On Bloody Disgusting, Rob Hunter rated it 3/5 "skulls" writing that "Tommy Savas’ feature debut checks those familiar sci-fi/horror boxes, but it updates the technological terrors with something unexpected – a goofy sense of humor." On The New York Times, Elisabeth Vincentelli wrote that "what’s even more disquieting, because it is so scarily plausible, is the range of options at the disposal of an all-controlling new program connected to people’s professional and personal lives."

On Dread Central, David Gelmini rated it 3.5/5 stars, and wrote in the summary of his review that "the apparent seriousness of its message about the dangers of AI never quite hits the right spot, but CognAItive is still a very inventive and decidedly absurd look at what could happen if AI eventually does become self-aware." On Starbust, Joel Harley rated it 3/5 stars, wondering if "Will CognAItive, like Chopping Mall and Lawnmower Man age badly, like the tech world’s own Elon Musk? (...) but, in the here-and-now, it’s a delightfully savage takedown of AI, tech bros, and Slack in the workplace."

== See also ==
- List of artificial intelligence films
- List of American films of 2025
- List of thriller films of the 2020s
- List of science fiction films of the 2020s
- List of horror films of the 2020s
