= Smokin' Aces 2: Assassins' Ball =

2010 film by P. J. Pesce

- DVD cover
- Directed by: P.J. Pesce
- Screenplay by: Olatunde Osunsanmi; Olumide Odebunmi; Tom Abrams; P.J. Pesce
- Story by: Olatunde Osunsanmi; Olumide Odebunmi; Joe Carnahan
- Based on: Characters by Joe Carnahan
- Produced by: Mike Elliott
- Starring: Tom Berenger; Clayne Crawford; Tommy Flanagan; Maury Sterling; Keegan Connor Tracy; Vinnie Jones
- Cinematography: David Geddes
- Edited by: Angela M. Catanzaro
- Music by: Tim Jones
- Production company: Working Title Films
- Distributed by: Universal Studios Home Entertainment
- Release date: January 19, 2010
- Running time: 86 minutes
- Countries: Canada; United States
- Language: English

Smokin' Aces 2: Assassins' Ball is a 2010 action thriller film directed by P.J. Pesce and starring Tom Berenger, Vinnie Jones, Tommy Flanagan, Autumn Reeser, Keegan Connor Tracy, and Ernie Hudson. The film is a prequel to Joe Carnahan's 2006 film Smokin' Aces, centering on an FBI desk jockey who is targeted for murder by various hired assassins. It was produced by Working Title Films, and was released direct-to-video on January 19, 2010, by Universal Studios Home Entertainment.

== Plot ==
Walter Weed, an unassuming desk jockey at the FBI, is informed of an assassination threat against him from a mysterious figure called Hal Leuco. Weed will be assassinated on April 19 at precisely 3:00 am. Several assassins have taken the contract, including Ariella Martinez, a femme fatale who kills her victims with exotic poisons; Finbar McTeague, nicknamed "The Surgeon" for brutally torturing his victims; Fritz Tremor and his children Lester, Kaitlyn, and Baby Boy; and Lazlo Soot, a sadistic master of disguise.

An FBI unit led by Zane Baker secures Weed in a bunker beneath a safe house masquerading as a jazz bar. Weed is directly protected by Baker and his colleagues Nicholas and Redstone, whilst fellow Agent Malcolm Little oversees various FBI agents posing as bar staff and patrons. Outside the bunker, a team led by Agent Abrego protects the corridors between the bunker door and the bar. Supervisory Agent Dominic Dumare monitors the whole operation from an adjoining hotel. The assassins enter Chicago separately and approach the location. McTeague and Martinez meet inside whilst the Tremors begin killing agents outside the bar so they can storm it. Meanwhile, Soot kills Dumare and poses as him to access the bunker.

Eight minutes before the 3:00 am deadline, McTeague and Martinez create an attempted hostage situation that turns into a Mexican standoff with the FBI agents. The standoff escalates into a shootout when the Tremors fire a bomb-strapped clown through the bar doors. Several FBI agents are killed, and Martinez is mortally wounded. McTeague takes the dying Martinez to a closet, where he cradles her as she dies. Angered, McTeague kills Baby Boy in revenge before being gunned down by Lester and Fritz.

Meanwhile, the disguised Soot escapes the firefight and tricks Abrego into letting him into the secure area. His disguise is damaged while killing Abrego. The Tremors breach the elevator and kill the agents outside the bunker. Soot, having taken another agent hostage, threatens to kill him unless Baker opens the bunker door. Baker refuses, and the standoff is interrupted when the Tremors fire a rocket-propelled grenade at the door, which Soot narrowly escapes.

Kaitlyn breaches the bunker through the adjoining tunnels and starts firing on the agents and Weed. Nicholas is killed protecting Weed just before Baker kills Kaitlyn. With only two minutes to go to the deadline, Weed suddenly tries to open the bunker door, revealing he has C4 hidden under his wheelchair, rigged to a dead man switch. Redstone tries to kill Weed to stop the threat, forcing Baker to shoot and wound Redstone. Weed asserts that he must die to kill the assassins for their heinous acts against the US, believing he will be hailed as a patriotic hero after his death. Baker, realizing Weed is insane, attempts to save the wounded Redstone by dragging him to a "spider trap" protective shelter on the bunker's floor. Weed detonates the C4, destroying the bunker and the bar. Baker cannot get Redstone into the spider trap in time and can only save himself. Fritz, critically wounded by the explosion, begs for help from Lester, who coldly kills him as revenge for abusing him for years.

Following the explosion, Lester and Soot use the emergency services to escape into the crowd. Baker emerges from the ruins to find himself and Little are the only surviving FBI agents. Baker is approached by Special Agent Anthony Vejar, who asks him if he saw Weed die. Vejar reveals Weed is a CIA elite black ops specialist, using the identity of Hal Leuco to manage the assassins in covert missions over the years. Weed/Leuco arranged the assassination plot as a ploy to gather the assassins in one place and have them killed. Baker realises Weed is still alive. However, as he tries to escape, Baker intercepts Weed and shoots him dead before walking away.

== Cast ==
- Tom Berenger as Walter Weed, FBI intelligence analyst; Revealed to be Hal Leuco, short for Haliaeetus leucocephalus, Latin for "bald eagle." Also known as "Socrates".
- Clayne Crawford as FBI Supervisory Special Agent Zane Baker
- David Richmond-Peck as FBI Special Agent Dominic Dumare
- Jason Schombing as FBI Special Agent Abrego
- Jared Keeso as FBI Special Agent Nicholas
- Hrothgar Mathews as FBI Special Agent Redstone
- Christopher Michael Holley as FBI Special Agent Malcolm Little
- Merwin Mondesir as FBI Agent Osterberg
- Michael Edwards as FBI Agent Williamson
- Phillip Mitchell as FBI Agent Culham
- Douglas Chapman as FBI Agent O'Keefe
- Grant Elliott as FBI Agent Patrch
- Kirsten Robek as FBI Analyst Jenny Lee
- Keegan Connor Tracy as FBI Analyst Vicky Salerno
- Sonja Bennett as FBI Analyst Jules Scott
- Ernie Hudson as FBI Special Agent Anthony Vejar
- Martha Higareda as Ariella Martinez
- Vinnie Jones as Finbar "The Surgeon" McTeague
- Autumn Reeser as Kaitlyn "AK-47" Tremor
- Maury Sterling as Lester Tremor
- Michael Parks as Fritz Tremor
- C. Ernst Harth as Baby Boy Tremor
- Tommy Flanagan as Lazlo Soot
- Peter Benson as Marty Mecklen
- Damon Johnson as Milton White

== Reception ==
On the review aggregator website Rotten Tomatoes, 44% of 9 critics' reviews are positive, with an average rating of 4.2/10.
