= Marquis Cooper =

American football player (1982–2009)

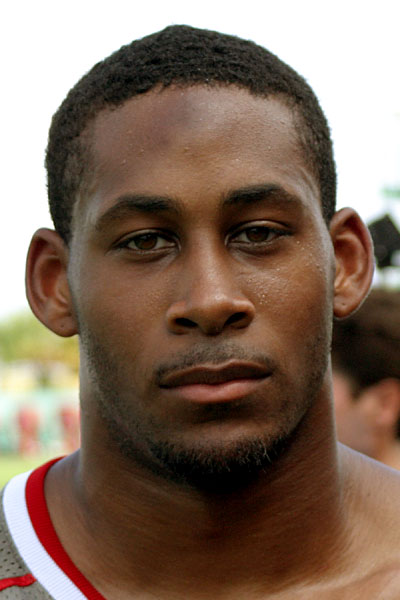
- Cooper in 2004

No. 58, 50, 95, 55
- Position: Linebacker

Personal information
- Born: March 11, 1982; Mesa, Arizona, U.S.
- Died: March 2009 (aged 26) near Clearwater, Florida, U.S.
- Listed height: 6 ft 3 in (1.91 m)
- Listed weight: 213 lb (97 kg)

Career information
- High school: Highland (Gilbert, Arizona)
- College: Washington
- NFL draft: 2004: 3rd round, 79th overall pick

Career history
- Tampa Bay Buccaneers (2004–2005); Minnesota Vikings (2006); Pittsburgh Steelers (2006); Seattle Seahawks (2006); Pittsburgh Steelers (2007); Jacksonville Jaguars (2007); Pittsburgh Steelers (2007); Oakland Raiders (2008)

Career NFL statistics
- Total tackles: 37
- Stats at Pro Football Reference

Marquis Victor Cooper (March 11, 1982 – March 2009) was an American professional football player who was a linebacker in the National Football League (NFL). He was selected by the Tampa Bay Buccaneers in the third round of the 2004 NFL draft. Cooper also played for the Minnesota Vikings, Pittsburgh Steelers, Seattle Seahawks, Jacksonville Jaguars, and Oakland Raiders. He played college football for the Washington Huskies.

On March 1, 2009, Cooper and three other men went missing after their boat capsized in rough seas near Clearwater, Florida. Cooper and two of the men are now presumed to be dead.

== Early and personal life ==
Cooper was the oldest child of KPNX sportscaster Bruce Cooper and wife Donna. He has a younger sister named Donielle. He was born in Mesa, Arizona and was raised in Gilbert, Arizona, and attended Gilbert Junior High School and Highland High School, where he became an All-State player in football.

Though his grandfather worked in the athletic department of Arizona State University, Cooper attended the University of Washington. He graduated with a degree in sociology and was a member of the Pac-10 All-Conference team in 2003. Cooper and wife Rebekah, who met while attending the University of Washington, have a daughter named Delaney Christine. In the offseason, the family lived in Tampa, Florida.

== Professional career ==
=== Tampa Bay Buccaneers ===
Cooper was selected by the Tampa Bay Buccaneers in the third round (79th overall) of the 2004 NFL draft. He was released just before the start of the 2006 season, on September 2.

=== Minnesota Vikings ===
Cooper signed with the Minnesota Vikings on September 5, 2006. He was released on October 30.

=== Pittsburgh Steelers (first stint) ===
On October 31, 2006, Cooper was claimed off waivers by the Pittsburgh Steelers. The Steelers waived him on December 5.

=== Seattle Seahawks ===
Cooper was signed by the Seattle Seahawks on December 12. He finished the 2006 season with the team and was released the following year on July 27, 2007.

=== Pittsburgh Steelers (second stint) ===
Cooper was claimed off waivers by the Steelers on July 30, 2007. On September 19, he was released by the Steelers.

=== Jacksonville Jaguars ===
On November 27, 2007, Cooper signed with the Jacksonville Jaguars. The Jaguars released him on December 7.

=== Pittsburgh Steelers (third stint) ===
The Steelers signed Cooper for a third time on December 9, 2007. He became a free agent in the 2008 offseason.

=== Oakland Raiders ===
Cooper was signed by the Oakland Raiders on November 5, 2008, after linebacker Robert Thomas was placed on injured reserve.

== Statistics ==
Year	Team	Tackles	Sacks	Safety	FF	FR	Int	Yds	TD
2004	TB	9	0	0	0	0	0	0	0
2005	TB	18	0	0	0	0	0	0	0
2006	MIN	0	0	0	0	0	0	0	0
2006	PIT	0	0	0	0	0	0	0	0
2006	SEA	1	0	0	0	0	0	0	0
2007	JAC	2	0	0	0	0	0	0	0
2007	PIT	2	0	0	0	0	0	0	0
2008	Oak	5	0	0	0	0	0	0	0
Career		37	0	0	0	0	0	0	0

== Boating accident and disappearance ==
On March 1, 2009, the U.S. Coast Guard reported that a 21-foot fishing boat was missing off the Gulf Coast near Clearwater, Florida. The boat was carrying four passengers: Cooper, Corey Smith, and two former University of South Florida football players, Nick Schuyler and Will Bleakley. The four men left Clearwater Pass on February 28 at 6:30 a.m. and were expected to return later that night. The Coast Guard began searching for the missing boat shortly after midnight on March 1, 2009. By 1:35 p.m. local time on March 2, 2009, the boat had been located, overturned, with Schuyler clinging to it.

The search for the three missing men was called off by the Coast Guard, but friends and relatives organized their own search. The private search was called off on March 6. Cooper, Smith, and Bleakley are presumed dead. On March 11, Cooper's wife filed for a death certificate in civil court.

On March 25, 2009, a report was released based on a Florida Fish and Wildlife Conservation Commission investigation into the capsizing; the investigation included interviews with Schuyler (the survivor) and an inspection of the boat. The report concluded the following:

- the anchor line was tied to the port-side transom as part of a (mistaken) plan to free the anchor;
- the vessel, which had a 200 horsepower (150 kW) motor, was then throttled forward;
- the rear of the vessel was pulled into the water because the vessel's motor had been throttled without enough slack in the anchor line; and
- the capsizing ejected the operator and occupants into rough Gulf waters.

The conclusions were accompanied by additional details from the Schuyler interviews. According to Schuyler, after the capsizing, he and the other three men, all wearing flotation devices, struggled overnight to remain on top of the capsized hull of the boat, with water reaching chest-high over the partially submerged hull and waves of approximately 6 ft (1.83 m). Cooper and Smith became non-responsive and separated from the vessel between 5:30 and 6:30 the morning of March 1, and Bleakley became non-responsive and separated about 24 hours later, which was less than six hours before Schuyler was rescued. The investigator described the symptoms Schuyler witnessed as characteristic of hypothermia.

== Media portrayal ==
Cooper is portrayed by Quentin Plair in the 2025 film Not Without Hope.

== See also ==
- Not Without Hope
- List of American football players who died during their careers
- List of people who disappeared mysteriously at sea
