= Blood, Guts, Bullets and Octane =

Blood, Guts, Bullets, and Octane
- Film poster
- Directed by: Joe Carnahan
- Written by: Joe Carnahan
- Produced by: Joe Carnahan; Dan Leis
- Starring: Joe Carnahan; Dan Leis; Nick Fenske
- Edited by: Joe Carnahan
- Music by: Dan Kolton; Luis Resto
- Distributed by: New Wave Films; Lions Gate Films
- Release date: January 1998 (Sundance)
- Running time: 87 minutes
- Language: English
- Box office: $15,035

Blood, Guts, Bullets, and Octane is a 1998 American independent action comedy film written, produced, edited, directed and starring Joe Carnahan in his feature-length directorial debut.

For years the film was under negotiation for development as a prime time series on NBC by Carnahan and producer Bob Levy.

== Premise ==
The film stars Carnahan and the film's other producer Dan Leis as two salesmen of a failing used car dealership who are paid $250,000 to allow a 1965 Pontiac LeMans convertible onto the dealership lot for two days. They later find out that the vehicle may have been stolen, which results in a chase and the car being held for ransom.
