= Chad Powers =

American sports comedy television series

- Promotional poster
- Genre: Sports comedy
- Created by: Glen Powell; Michael Waldron
- Based on: Eli's Places Segment by: ESPN; Omaha Productions
- Starring: Glen Powell; Perry Mattfeld; Quentin Plair; Wynn Everett; Frankie Rodriguez; Steve Zahn
- Music by: Natalie Holt
- Country of origin: United States
- Original language: English
- No. of seasons: 2
- No. of episodes: 12

Production
- Executive producers: Michael Waldron; Adam Fasullo; Glen Powell; Eli Manning; Peyton Manning; Jamie Horowitz; Ben Brown; Burke Magnus; Brian Lockhart; Kati Fernandez; Tony Yacenda; Luvh Rakhe
- Producers: Alex Orr; Arturs Rusis
- Cinematography: Mark Schwartzbard; Jeffrey Waldron; Isaac Bauman; Brian Lannin
- Editors: Patrick Tuck; Max Koepke; Julio Perez; Micah Gardner; Paul Swain; Evan Colten
- Running time: 27–40 minutes
- Production companies: Anomaly Pictures; Barnstorm; ESPN; Omaha Productions; 20th Television

Original release
- Network: Hulu
- Release: September 30, 2025 – present

Chad Powers is an American sports comedy television series created by Glen Powell and Michael Waldron, starring Powell in the titular role. Developed from an Omaha Productions skit by Eli Manning, the show follows Russ Holliday after he disgraces himself on the field while serving as a star quarterback at a major college program. After ruining his reputation, Holliday undergoes a physical transformation, with the help of prosthetics and a wig, to disguise his identity in order to join the floundering football team at an SEC school under the name of Chad Powers.

The cast includes Steve Zahn, Toby Huss, Perry Mattfeld, Clayne Crawford, Wynn Everett, Frankie A. Rodriguez, Colton Ryan, Keese Wilson, Xavier Mills and Quentin Plair. It premiered on Hulu on September 30, 2025. In December 2025, the series was renewed for a second season which premiered on September 3, 2026.

== Cast ==
=== Main ===
- Glen Powell as Russ Holliday, an arrogant former college football quarterback whose career was nuked after he disgraced himself in a National Championship game. He disguises himself as the titular Chad Powers to start over as a walk-on player for the South Georgia Catfish.
- Perry Mattfeld as Erica "Ricky" Hudson, the offensive assistant coach of the South Georgia Catfish and daughter of the head coach
- Quentin Plair as Coach Byrd, the offensive coordinator of the South Georgia Catfish
- Wynn Everett as Tricia Yaegar, the chair of the booster trust.
- Frankie Rodriguez as Danny Cruz, the team's mascot who helps Russ with his disguise and later, becomes friends
- Steve Zahn as Jake Hudson, the head coach of the South Georgia Catfish

=== Recurring ===
- Clayne Crawford as Coach Dobbs, the quarterback coach of the South Georgia Catfish
- Toby Huss as Mike Holliday, Russ's father
- Colton Ryan as Gerry Dougan, the backup quarterback of the South Georgia Catfish
- Xavier Mills as Nishan Leonard, the star wide receiver of the South Georgia Catfish
- Keese Wilson as Rod Mason, the center of the South Georgia Catfish
- Becca Breitfeller as Sasha (season 2; co-starring season 1), the cheer captain of the South Georgia Catfish cheer team
- Colin Woodell as Jay (season 2), a rich booster who gets Ricky a coaching opportunity
- Craig Tate as Charlie Brooks (season 2), the new athletic director of the South Georgia Catfish

=== Guests ===
- Haliey Welch as herself
- Eli Manning as Ole Miss Coach
- Megan Ketch as Wendy Hudson, the wife of Jake Hudson and stepmother of Ricky

== Episodes ==
=== Series overview ===
Season	Episodes	Originally released	
Season	Episodes	First released	Last released
1	6	September 30, 2025	October 28, 2025
2	6	September 3, 2026	

=== Season 1 (2025) ===
No. overall	No. in season	Title	Directed by	Written by	Original release date	Prod. code
1	1	"1ST QUARTER"	Tony Yacenda	Glen Powell & Michael Waldron	September 30, 2025	1NJK01
Russ Holliday rushes to a touchdown as a star collegiate quarterback. He inadvertently drops the ball before the end zone, however, leading the opposing team to grab the ball and win the championship game. A distraught Russ gets into an altercation with a fan on the sidelines, tipping the fan over a boy in a wheelchair who has cancer. Eight years later, his reputation ruined, Russ leads a free-wheeling life but desires to get back into athletics. He uses materials from his makeup artist father to disguise his identity and masquerade as quarterback Chad Powers while trying out for the football team of a small college in Georgia. Danny, who plays the team's mascot (a catfish), offers to help Russ with the ruse. Russ impresses the coaches, and he briefly connects with Ricky, an assistant coach and daughter of the head coach, Jake Hudson. Russ admits that he isn't enrolled after being offered a spot, but the coach tells him to come back and register with his birth certificate, driver's license, and transcripts.
2	2	"2ND QUARTER"	Tony Yacenda	Michael Waldron & Paloma Lamb	September 30, 2025	1NJK02
Russ obtains a fake id with the help of Danny. On the team, Chad is competing against the earnest and friendly Gerry for the position of starting quarterback. Coach Hudson tells Chad to show leadership and invites him to a team barbecue at his house. A pool party and water balloon fight ensue, posing a risk for Chad's disguise. Meanwhile, Ricky is embarrassed about being seen as the coach's daughter. Chad receives the news that Hudson has chosen Gerry as the starter.
3	3	"3RD QUARTER"	Payman Benz	Jamie Lee	October 7, 2025	1NJK03
In the first game of the season, Chad stays on the sidelines as a backup while Gerry takes the quarterback position. The team plays poorly, with Gerry struggling to make passes. Ricky presents an idea to turn the game around that would involve replacing Gerry with Chad. Her ideas are dismissed by the other coaches, and she is told to get off the field. Danny, playing the mascot, purposefully trips Gerry, taking him out of the game with an injury. Left with no choice, Hudson puts Chad in the game. Chad manages to score his first touchdown for the Catfish. In the final play, Chad decides to ignore the coaches' strategy in favor of Ricky's play, enabling the Catfish to win. Instead of celebrating with the team, Chad goes to find Ricky and shares a moment with her.
4	4	"4TH QUARTER"	Payman Benz	Ben Dougan	October 14, 2025	1NJK04
The Catfish are in Knoxville the night before a game. Russ needs to obtain glue for his disguise before curfew at 11 pm. He and Danny steal a cheerleader's car to search for the glue. They end up at the hospital after Russ cuts his hand. He and Danny fight, leading Danny to leave. Russ steals medical adhesive from the hospital to use in the disguise and rushes back to the hotel. There, Ricky recognizes him as Russ Holliday. They chat, and he tells her to reconcile with her dad. Danny covers for Russ on the curfew check, and having reconciled, they make the Chad Powers disguise. After the game the next day, Ricky looks up Russ on her phone, seeing that he is out of the public eye.
5	5	"5TH QUARTER"	Tony Yacenda	Jordan Mendoza	October 21, 2025	1NJK05
Chad has an awkward interview with College Gameday, who are in South Georgia, featuring the 5-0 Catfish. Frustrated with the double life, Russ goes to a bar and hooks up with a woman who approaches him. The woman tells Russ that everybody deserves to be happy, which influences Russ to lean further into the Chad Powers persona. The next day, Chad goes to Coach Hudson's lakehouse for a new interview, where he learns that the woman from the bar was Hudson's wife, Wendy. During the interview, Wendy expresses frustration with Hudson's total commitment to football rather than their marriage, which leads to a fight and ends the interview. During the fight, Wendy admits she had an affair with Russ Holliday the night before. After Wendy leaves, Hudson begins to have a heart attack.
6	6	"6TH QUARTER"	Michael Waldron	Luvh Rakhe & Gaelyn Golde	October 28, 2025	1NJK06
While Coach Hudson suffers a heart attack, Chad realizes he must drive him to the hospital in his Cybertruck. Ricky, upon seeing the vehicle, realizes that Chad is really Russ Holliday. At practice, Ricky removes Chad's armband, revealing an arm tattoo that Russ is known to have. Chad leaves practice and tells Danny that he's been caught and is leaving the team. Danny convinces Chad to drive to Atlanta, where his dad is working on a movie. Russ's father is impressed by his hard work to pull off the disguise and encourages him to show up for the game against top-ranked Georgia. Ricky goes to the hospital to visit Hudson, who remains excited that they are contenders for the National Championship because of Chad. Russ, in his Chad persona, shows up to the game and attempts to talk to Ricky. Ricky does not forgive him and threatens to expose Chad unless he quits the team. Russ calls her bluff, stating that revealing him as Chad would ruin her father's career. Chad shows up for the game, which encourages the team, except for Gerry, who is furious.

=== Season 2 (2026) ===
No. overall	No. in season	Title	Directed by	Written by	Original release date	Prod. code
7	1	"7th Quarter"	Michael Waldron	Michael Waldron & Jen Bashian	September 3, 2026	2NJK01
Ricky is angry at Russ following his revelation to her as Chad Powers. She doesn't tell him a play during a game, and he gets hit, dislocating his shoulder and causing his prosthetic nose to come loose. Chad flees into the stadium out of fear that he will be discovered. Coach Hudson, who is attending the game as a fan following his heart attack, is concerned about Chad. Ricky reluctantly agrees to help Danny reattach Chad's prosthetic nose and to fix his shoulder. Chad returns to the game, angering the backup quarterback Gerry who wants to play.
8	2	"8th Quarter"	Michael Waldron	Rebecca Addelman	September 3, 2026	2NJK02
Coach Hudson tries to get to know Chad as a person. Meanwhile, Danny and Chad are invited to a party with all the football players, but Russ is reluctant to go. Ricky visits Russ and Danny at their home, where they are making the prosthetics used in Chad's disguise. She and Russ connect, and she encourages him to go to the party. At the party, Gerry tells Chad that he saw Ricky leaving Chad's house, accusing him of an affair. They get in an altercation, and Gerry tells Hudson the purported affair. Hudson helps Chad to explain it away, but Hudson is upset and later confronts Ricky. Ricky tells Chad that they cannot be friends.
9	3	"9th Quarter"	Tony Yacenda	Ben Dougan	September 3, 2026	2NJK03
Coach Hudson benches Chad during a critical play, and the Catfish lose. Chad views the snub as retaliation for his relationship with Ricky. After the game, the team is stuck in the airport. Tricia and Chad discuss firing Hudson, with Chad in favor, but he later changes his mind, wanting to keep Hudson. A wealthy booster for the team pursues Ricky romantically.
10	4	"10th Quarter"	Tony Yacenda	Jordan Mendoza & Rickey Larke	September 3, 2026	2NJK04
A new athletic director unsuccessfully attempts to visit Chad's childhood home, prompting questions about Chad's origins. To help with his cover story, Chad brings his dad to a team gala disguised as Howard Powers. Tricia and the athletic director encourage Chad to stay for another year with the team, rather than turning pro. Chad's dad confronts him in private, arguing that the pressure and risks are too high. Chad dismisses the advice, telling everyone that he is staying for a second year. Gerry sees that Chad's dad is wearing a disguise.
11	5	"11th Quarter"	Michael Waldron	Gaelyn Golde	September 3, 2026	2NJK05
Gerry gets Danny fired as the Catfish mascot after presenting evidence that Danny tripped him, and Gerry dons the costume, leading Chad to unwittingly speak in his normal voice, thinking he is conversing with Danny. Chad and Danny hatch a plan to discredit Gerry in case he comes forward. Russ is seen by Coach Dobbs near Gerry's apartment. Ricky gets a job offer as QB coach with Syracuse. Danny escalates by planting a gun in Gerry's locker. Gerry breaks into Danny's house, assaults him, and sees Chad's masks.
12	6	"12th Quarter"	Michael Waldron	Luvh Rakhe	September 3, 2026	2NJK06
The Catfish face Texas in their final regular season game, with the winner positioned to receive an at-large playoff berth. Chad, having been blackmailed, agrees to ensure Gerry wins a series of prop bets related to Chad's performance, including a lack of passing or rushing touchdowns. At halftime, Danny reveals to Ricky that Chad is throwing the game and why, so in the second half, she schemes a series of trick plays that allow the Catfish to score without Chad passing or rushing for touchdowns. In the closing seconds, with a winning score called back by penalty, Chad is forced to rush for a touchdown, breaking his agreement with Gerry, who charges Chad in a rage during the on-field celebration. He is intercepted by Tricia's bodyguard, who reveals he knows Chad's true identity; in an act of desperation, Danny had enlisted Tricia's help, in the process revealing all. With Gerry neutralized, Tricia plans to exploit her knowledge, keeping Russ playing the role of Chad Powers indefinitely to her own ends. Ricky and Chad retreat to a training room where they begin kissing, only to be caught by Coach Hudson.

== Production ==
Chad Powers was created by Glen Powell and Michael Waldron and received a series order from Hulu in February 2024. It is based on Eli Manning's character from Eli's Places. Eli and Peyton Manning were involved in the show's production, assisting in securing football arenas and props for filming. They also provided guidance to Powell on authentically portraying a star quarterback. Filming began in late August 2024. Several of the football scenes were filmed at Center Parc Stadium in Atlanta.

Natalie Holt composed the score of the series. Patrick Tuck served as editor.

On December 3, 2025, Hulu renewed the series for a second season. On January 7, 2026, the second season began filming. Waldron directed four episodes for the season, including first and final episodes for the season.

== Release ==
Chad Powers premiered on Hulu and Hulu on Disney+ in the United States, and on Disney+ internationally, on September 30, 2025. The first two episodes were released simultaneously, with subsequent episodes debuting weekly. The second season premiered on September 3, 2026.

== Reception ==
=== Viewership ===
Chad Powers ranked No. 1 on both Disney+ and Hulu's top lists—daily updated lists of the platforms' most-watched titles—following its premiere. TVision, which tracks viewer attention, program reach, and engagement across more than 1,000 CTV apps, reported that it was the fourth most-streamed program in the U.S. between September 29 and October 12. Whip Media, which tracks viewership data for the more than 25 million worldwide users of its TV Time app, announced that Chad Powers ranked among the ten most-streamed original shows in the U.S. from the week ending October 12 through October 19. Luminate, which measures streaming performance in the U.S. by analyzing viewership data, audience engagement metrics, and content reach across various platforms, announced that it debuted at No. 34 on its Top 50 streaming shows with nearly 1.6 million hours viewed from a single episode. The following week, Chad Powers rose to No. 19 with 2.2 million hours viewed across two episodes, and it remained on Luminate's weekly chart throughout its six-episode run.

=== Critical response ===
Critical response of Chad Powers
Season	Rotten Tomatoes	Metacritic
1	60% (52 reviews)	53 (26 reviews)
2	92% (12 reviews)	76 (5 reviews)

On the review aggregator website Rotten Tomatoes, the first season holds an approval rating of 60% based on 52 reviews, with an average of rated reviews of 6/10. The website's critics consensus reads, "Pairing Glen Powell's charms with a frequently off-putting role, Chad Powers throws comedic curveballs that often backfire but don't necessarily strike out, either." Metacritic, which uses a weighted average, gave a score of 53 out of 100 based on 26 critics, indicating "mixed or average".

Stuart Heritage of The Guardian awarded 4 out of 5 stars to season one, with praise for Powell's performance and the show's exploration of identity. Heritage wrote: "It's a funny, touching, deliberately uncomfortable character piece with one of the most magnetic central performances in recent memory." Alex Kirshner of Slate viewed the show as successfully balancing absurdity and humor, while building a fictional college football world that feels engaging despite its implausible premise.

In a mostly negative review for Vulture, critic Nicholas Quah described the show as largely "a cynical corporate experiment, engineered within an inch of its life", while noting that the show occasionally breaks through with flashes of heart and Powell's charisma. Alison Herman of Variety wrote that the season felt rushed, without time to fully develop or explore the dynamics between characters, particularly the relationship between Russ and his father. Herman also found that while Chad Powers shares tonal and structural similarities with Ted Lasso, it lacks the depth and emotional development that contributed to Ted Lasso's resonance.

The second season has a 92% approval rating on Rotten Tomatoes, based on 12 reviews, with an average of rated reviews of 7.2/10. The website's critical consensus states, "Though it continues to mine the same jokes, Chad Powers gains several yards with its comedic timing thanks to Glen Powell steadily guiding this series to the end zone once more." On Metacritic, it has a weighted average score of 76 out of 100 based on 5 reviews, indicating "generally favorable" reviews.

=== Accolades ===
Year	Award	Category	Nominee(s)	Result	Ref.
2025	Astra Creative Arts Awards	Best Hairstyling – Television	Chad Powers	Won	
2025	Astra Creative Arts Awards	Best Makeup – Television	Chad Powers	Nominated	
2025	Hollywood Music in Media Awards	Best Original Score – TV Show/Limited Series	Natalie Holt	Nominated	
2026	GLAAD Media Awards	Outstanding New TV Series	Chad Powers	Nominated	
2026	Golden Globe Awards	Best Performance by a Male Actor in a Television Series – Musical or Comedy	Glen Powell	Nominated	
2026	Golden Trailer Awards	Best Comedy Trailer – TV/Streaming Series	"Redemption" (Hulu / Create Advertising Group)	Nominated	
2026	Golden Trailer Awards	Best Comedy TV Spot – TV/Streaming Series	"Power Surge" (Hulu / X/AV)	Nominated	
2026	Golden Trailer Awards	Best Viral Campaign – TV/Streaming Series	Digital Campaign (Hulu / X/AV)	Nominated	
2026	Golden Trailer Awards	Most Original TV Spot – TV/Streaming Series	"This is Chad Powers" (Hulu Originals)	Nominated	
2026	Satellite Awards	Best Actor in a Series – Comedy or Musical	Glen Powell	Nominated	
