= Stretch (2014 film) =

- Promotional poster
- Directed by: Joe Carnahan
- Screenplay by: Joe Carnahan
- Story by: Jerry Corley; Rob Rose; Joe Carnahan
- Produced by: Jason Blum; Joe Carnahan; Tracy Falco
- Starring: Patrick Wilson; Ed Helms; James Badge Dale; Brooklyn Decker; Jessica Alba
- Cinematography: Yasu Tanida
- Edited by: Kevin Hale; Jason Hellmann
- Music by: Ludwig Göransson
- Production companies: Blumhouse Productions; IM Global
- Distributed by: Universal Pictures
- Release date: October 14, 2014
- Running time: 94 minutes
- Country: United States
- Language: English
- Budget: $5 million

Stretch is a 2014 American crime comedy film written and directed by Joe Carnahan and starring Patrick Wilson, Ed Helms, James Badge Dale, Brooklyn Decker, Jessica Alba, and Chris Pine. Wilson portrays the title character, a struggling limousine chauffeur who finds his life in danger after he picks up a mysterious millionaire (Pine).

The film was originally scheduled to be theatrically released in the United States on March 21, 2014. However, just a month prior to the date, Universal Pictures pulled it from their schedule before eventually distributing it on video on demand on October 14, 2014.

== Plot ==
Kevin “Stretch” Brzyzowski (Wilson) is a failed actor turned limo driver in Los Angeles who is addicted to cocaine, alcohol, and gambling. One day, he is thrown from his car in an accident. Miraculously uninjured, he confronts the other driver, Candace (Decker), only to fall instantly in love. After a year of dating, Stretch is inspired to give up his addictions and propose, but Candace abruptly breaks up with him to be with a wealthy athlete. This propels Stretch down a self-destructive spiral. Though he remains free of his addictions, he retains a $6,000 gambling debt to the Mexican mafia. He also has hallucinatory conversations with the bitter ghost of another failed actor and limo driver named Karl, who committed suicide in front of two customers.

Stretch's boss, Naseem (Toub), tells him that their chief competitor, a mysterious man known only as The Jovi (Couture), has been stealing their clients. Unless they can steal clients from The Jovi, Naseem will be forced to fold his business. The mafia also demands that Stretch resolve his debt by midnight. Stretch begs Charlie (Alba), a sympathetic coworker, to direct any high-paying customers his way, as a generous tip is his only hope for paying in time. Although unsure how he will solve his problems, Stretch takes time to set up a blind date with a woman online.

When The Jovi steals Stretch's first client, actor David Hasselhoff, Charlie sends Stretch to intercept one of The Jovi's clients, Ray Liotta. Liotta tasks Stretch with returning a prop pistol and badge to the studio where he was filming. But before Stretch can do so, Charlie sends him another client: Roger Karos (Pine), an eccentric and hedonistic millionaire who suggests he will pay Stretch's debt if Stretch serves him, for the night, without question.

Karos asks to be dropped off at a secretive sex club and gives Stretch 99 minutes to see a certain man across town, then return to the club with an important briefcase and a supply of cocaine. Stretch's quest takes him to a nightclub where he meets Laurent (Dale), a French criminal, to whom Karos has promised some mysterious ledgers in exchange for the contents of the briefcase. Since Stretch knows nothing of the ledgers, he must come up with an alternative plan. Using Liotta's prop gun and badge, Stretch convinces Laurent and his men into believing that he is a police officer, and they surrender the briefcase. As he leaves, he encounters Candace and insinuates that he has become successful and important. When she expresses interest in him, he turns her down, enjoying a sense of satisfaction.

Naseem fires Stretch after complaints about the missing props and has the limo's operating system shut down via remote access. At that moment, the Jovi's brother, Boris (Willig), who operates a tow truck, arrives to take the limo. However, Stretch fast-talks the security-system operator into believing that he's a cop whose life is on the line during a gunfight, and the limo is restored to working condition, allowing him to escape. Next, he procures Karos’ desired cocaine from a reality-television star, who then steals the limo. Stretch reacquires it, only for Boris to catch up to him again. Stretch then has to detach the limo from the tow truck as they travel across the highway.

Karos complains that Stretch is one minute late when he returns. When the Mexican mafia also complains that Stretch is late with his payment, Stretch instructs them to meet him at Karos' final destination. There, Karos abandons Stretch to The Jovi, Boris, and the Mexican mafia, revealing that he was never going to tip him the $6000. Laurent, revealed to be an FBI agent, arrives to arrest Karos for embezzlement. As Karos prepares to kill Laurent in a sneak attack, Stretch creates a diversion, saves Laurent's life, and escapes.

The next morning, at a diner, Stretch gives the ledgers to Laurent, who declines to arrest him and compliments his acting skills. As Stretch looks around, he realizes that he has ended up at the meeting point he arranged with his blind date. He is surprised to find that the woman is there, and when she is revealed to be Charlie, the two laugh and kiss.

== Cast ==
- Patrick Wilson as Kevin "Stretch" Brzyzowski, a down-on-his-luck limo driver and aspiring actor in debt to a Mexican gang.
- Chris Pine as Roger Karos, an eccentric millionaire wanted by the FBI. Pine went uncredited for the role.
- Ed Helms as Karl, a successful limo driver who took his own life. He appears as a hallucination to Stretch.
- Jessica Alba as Charlie, a receptionist at Stretch's limo company and one of his few friends.
- James Badge Dale as Laurent, an FBI agent attempting to capture Karos.
- Brooklyn Decker as Candace, Stretch's ex-girlfriend.
- Ben Bray as Ignacio, a bookmaker whom Stretch owes money to.
- Randy Couture as the Jovi, a rival chauffeur.
- Matt Willig as Boris, the Jovi's fearsome brother and a tow truck driver.
- Shaun Toub as Nasseem, Stretch's boss.

Ray Liotta, David Hasselhoff, Norman Reedus, and Shaun White appear as themselves. Christopher Michael Holley plays Caesar, a door manager who has an altercation with Stretch. Jason Mantzoukas portrays Manny, a valet. Keith Jardine makes an appearance as a doorman.

== Production ==
Filming began in July 2013.

== Release ==
The film was originally set to be theatrically released in the United States on March 21, 2014. On January 21, 2014, the film's March release was scrapped by Universal Pictures, in what The Hollywood Reporter called "an apparently unprecedented move." The film's producer, Jason Blum, was unable to interest other distributors in the film, so it reverted to Universal Pictures, who were unwilling to spend the $20–40 million it would take to promote and release the film theatrically.

The film was released on iTunes and Amazon.com on October 7, 2014, before being released via VOD on October 14, 2014. To coincide with the film's on-demand release, the filmmakers released a behind-the-scenes video showing the two leads, Wilson and Decker going through the mechanics of filming a sex scene in the movie. This release received media attention.

== Reception ==
Rotten Tomatoes, a review aggregator, reports that 88% of 17 surveyed critics gave the film a positive review; the average rating is 6.5/10.

Jordan Hoffman of The Guardian wrote, "While the movie does eventually ramp up to a terrific purr, it hits plenty of speed bumps in its opening. There's a significant settling-in period (and some may just be unable to get on board at all), but it does settle in once the 'one night' begins." Ignatiy Vishnevetsky of The A.V. Club rated it B− and called it "puerile, demented, and often funny". Drew Taylor of Indiewire rated it B+ and called it a potential cult film if it can reach an adventurous audience. Cliff Wheatley of IGN rated it 8.9/10 and called it "a snowball of carnage and comedy". Scott Tobias of The Dissolve called it "an obnoxious cartoon version of Hollywood noir" that "confuses confidence and bravado for wit and fun".
