= Reckless Tortuga =

- Genre: Comedy
- Country of origin: United States
- Original language: English

Original release
- Network: YouTube
- Release: May 30, 2008 – present

Reckless Tortuga is a YouTube web-based comedy channel consisting of several major web series and other side projects. The channel originally attracted popularity in early 2010 when they first aired The Online Gamer; however, they were also known for the series Psycho Girlfriend before The Online Gamer's introduction.

Reckless Tortuga was one of the larger comedy groups on YouTube and its members participated in events such as VidCon and San Diego Comic-Con. By 2014, the Reckless Tortuga YouTube Channel was listed on New Media Rockstars Top 100 Channels, ranked at #28. By October 2015, the channel had over 235 million video views and over 1,000,000 subscribers.

Aside from their main sketches, Reckless Tortuga were also working on projects such as Racism in America, Park It Up, The Sketch Lab, and Extra Butter, Please. Reckless Tortuga was formed by Lindsey Reckis, Jason Schnell, Eric Pumphrey.

Citing ever-changing YouTube terms of service leading to the removal of popular past videos and impacting the viability of continued use of the platform, Reckless Tortuga sold their subscriber base to an unrelated comedy troupe and exited YouTube in early 2019. Reckless Tortuga returned on March 3, 2020, by re-uploading episodes of The Clan, a spin-off of The Online Gamer which was previously housed on the now-defunct Machinima Prime channel. The group is now back to making videos again. Reckless Tortuga have continued to produce videos during the COVID-19 lockdown and have full control of the YouTube channels.

== Channels ==
There are two extra channels in addition to the main channel which features extra footage and content.

Reckless Tortuga

The main "Reckless Tortuga" channel, where most content is posted onto YouTube. The upload schedule is irregular and often subjected to change. Video length for each series vary but ranges from as much as 2 minutes to 9 minutes. The channel started on May 30, 2008.

Reckless Tortuga Two

The secondary channel "Reckless Tortuga Two" mainly features behind the scene footage which may include commentary or bloopers. The channel started on February 8, 2011.

Reckless Noobs

The channel "Reckless Noobs" features the cast and crew of Reckless Tortuga playing various video games such as Call of Duty: Black Ops, Mass Effect 3, and Grand Theft Auto IV. The commentary and reactions from the players alongside the game play is recorded in a split screen manner. The channel started on February 9, 2011.

== Series ==
=== Psycho Girlfriend ===
Psycho Girlfriend was the most popular series prior to The Online Gamer and remains to be one of the top series of Reckless Tortuga. The series revolve around the destructive and unhealthy relationship of Seth (Tommy Savas) and Brandy (Lindsey Reckis). Brandy's possession of insane and obsessive behavior outside of the social convention and Seth's inability to escape the relationship is the basis for the show. The series started on March 2, 2009.

=== The Basement ===
The Basement is a completed series that featured teenagers tampering with supernatural forces. A group of teenagers in a basement jokes around with a ouija board and gets trapped by an evil spirit. They are then faced with the challenge of escaping their predicament alive. The series started on August 11, 2009, and ended on April 29, 2011.

=== The Online Gamer ===
The Online Gamer is the signature series for Reckless Tortuga. The sketch follows the life of an avid gamer, Aaron (Eric Pumphrey), whose obsession with video games has cast him as a social pariah. Aaron's inability to cope with social norms and his tendency to treat life as a video game has caused his family and friends to reject him. The series is known for its vulgar language and the use of video game references in real life. The cast also includes Aaron's girlfriend, Becka (Lynsey Bartilson), his coworker, Ted (Davan O'Firinn), his new boss, Damian (Tommy Savas), and his clan buddy Sam (Luke Baybak). Fans often cited Aaron's character as the main factor that made The Online Gamer the most popular and well-received series on the channel. The series started on December 23, 2009.

==== The Clan (The Online Gamer spin-off) ====
Reckless Tortuga soon made an expansion spin-off series based on The Online Gamer, called The Clan (stylized as TH3 cLAN), following Aaron and his new clan preparing for the upcoming Machinima Tournament. The cast includes Aaron's closest friend Sam (Luke Baybak), former television star Mike (Dylan Saunders) and a not-very-grown-up gamer named Josh (Kyle S. Moore). The series was originally only available on Machinima Prime—although there are The Online Gamer episodes that "cross over" with The Clan episodes—however, after Reckless Tortuga's return to YouTube on March 3, 2020, episodes of The Clan were re-uploaded which were previously housed on the now-defunct Machinima Prime channel.

=== The Sketch Lab ===
The Sketch Lab is a corner for side projects and single sketches by Reckless Tortuga. This is the area that does not contain series, but individual videos for any single idea. The Sketch Lab started on February 1, 2010.

=== Racism in America ===
Racism and stereotypes are satirized through awkward situations in this series. A person of a certain ethnicity in every episode is involved in a prejudiced situation that is eased through either comical or vengeful means after having performed several monologues explaining the situation. The series started on February 17, 2010.

=== Henchmen ===
The show consists of two henchmen who possess below average intelligence. They often perform tasks for a covert mob boss throughout the series and attempts to advance in the ranks. However, their immature behavior and lapse in judgement prevents them from doing so and often leads them to laughable situations. The series started on October 9, 2010.

=== Bad Friends ===
The series show the dysfunctional relationship between a normal character (Eric Pumphrey) and his socially awkward friends. The normal counterpart in the relationship would deal with the different issues caused his friends who push the social norms to the extreme. The situations in the sketch are so severely bizarre that it leaves the main character in a complete state of confusion. The series started on April 4, 2011.

=== Creepy Neighbor ===
Creepy Neighbor features the confrontational meetings between two neighbors. The male neighbor (Luke Baybak) is hyper aggressive and disturbed while the female character (Lindsey Reckis) possesses normal qualities. Threats of violence and hints of surveillance is made by male role, which leaves the female neighbor deeply concerned each episode. The series started on May 10, 2011.

=== Extra Butter, Please ===
Extra Butter, Please creates parodies of movies, sometimes revamping its ideas and other times mocking it. Films such as The Avengers, The Dark Knight Rises, and Prometheus have been featured in several episodes. One of the sub series in these sketches is Cops, which is the law enforcement counterpart to Henchmen while drawing from other films. The series started on August 11, 2011.

=== Park It Up ===
Park It Up is a mockumentary style sketch that follows the mundane life of a parking enforcement officer, Lenny (Luke Baybak). Lenny is a passive and socially awkward person who gets pushed around by his coworkers and people he tickets. He often gets into awkward situations and masks his anguish in his interviews. The series started on January 10, 2012.

=== Neurotica ===
The protagonist, Mitchell (Morgan Krantz) suffers from neuroticism and exhibits high levels of anxiety, moodiness, and jealousy. A regular situation is over analyzed and the audience is taken through Mitchell's train of thought in the form of a visual depiction and monologue. Then an unexpected or surprising outcome occurs either through the protagonist's actions or inaction. The series started on March 27, 2012.
