= Smokin' Aces =

2006 film by Joe Carnahan

- Theatrical release poster
- Directed by: Joe Carnahan
- Written by: Joe Carnahan
- Produced by: Tim Bevan; Eric Fellner
- Starring: Ben Affleck; Andy García; Alicia Keys; Ray Liotta; Jeremy Piven; Ryan Reynolds
- Cinematography: Mauro Fiore
- Edited by: Robert Frazen
- Music by: Clint Mansell
- Production companies: Universal Pictures; StudioCanal; Relativity Media; Working Title Films; Scion Films
- Distributed by: Universal Pictures (International; in most territories through United International Pictures); StudioCanal (France)
- Release dates: December 9, 2006 (Butt-Numb-A-Thon); January 12, 2007 (U.K.); January 26, 2007 (U.S.)
- Running time: 109 minutes
- Countries: United States; United Kingdom; France
- Language: English
- Budget: $17 million
- Box office: $57.3 million

Smokin' Aces is a 2006 crime action thriller film written and directed by Joe Carnahan. The film centers on the chase for a Las Vegas magician turned mafia informant after a one-million-dollar bounty is placed on him. It stars Ben Affleck, Jason Bateman, Common, Andy García, Alicia Keys, Ray Liotta, Jeremy Piven, and Ryan Reynolds. It was the official acting debut of Keys and Common.

The film is set in Lake Tahoe and was mainly filmed at Bally's Lake Tahoe, then known as Caesars Tahoe, and called the "Nomad Casino". It premiered at the 2006 Butt-Numb-A-Thon, before being released theatrically in the United Kingdom on January 12, 2007, and in the United States on January 26.

Smokin' Aces received negative reviews, but was a commercial success, grossing $57 million on a $17 million budget. It was followed by a 2010 prequel, Smokin' Aces 2: Assassins' Ball, directed by P. J. Pesce and produced and co-written by Carnahan.

== Plot ==
Las Vegas magician and wannabe gangster Buddy "Aces" Israel is in hiding at a Lake Tahoe hotel while his agent negotiates a potential immunity deal with FBI Deputy Director Stanley Locke. Special Agents Richard Messner and Donald Carruthers learn that ailing mob boss Primo Sparazza has issued a $1 million bounty on Israel and sent a mysterious "Swede" to bring him Israel's heart. Several assassins also seek the reward: master of disguise Lazlo Soot; hitwomen Sharice Watters and Georgia Sykes, hired by Sparazza's underboss; mercenary Pasquale Acosta; and psychotic neo-Nazi Tremors brothers: Darwin, Jeeves, and Lester.

Locke sends Messner and Carruthers to take Israel into protective custody. Bail bondsmen Jack Dupree, "Pistol" Pete Deeks, and Hollis Elmore have been hired to capture him as well. The bondsmen are attacked by the Tremors brothers, and only Elmore escapes alive. Messner visits the murder scene while Carruthers proceeds to the hotel, which each of the assassins has infiltrated. Carruthers recognizes Acosta, disguised as a security officer, in an elevator and both are seriously wounded in the ensuing gunfight.

Soot gains access to Israel's penthouse, posing as his henchman Hugo. Sir Ivy, Israel's second-in-command, confronts Israel for agreeing to inform on Ivy and his entourage as part of the plea deal and is subdued by hotel security. In Los Angeles, Locke abruptly withdraws from the deal with Israel but does not inform Messner and Carruthers. The Tremor brothers reach the penthouse floor and attack the security team and Ivy, who kills Jeeves and Lester. Israel, learning Locke has terminated the plea deal, attempts suicide but is unable to go through with it.

Finding Carruthers and Acosta, Sykes is cornered when Messner sets up a position around the elevator. Watters provides cover from a nearby hotel with an M82 sniper rifle, outgunning Messner's team. Acosta wounds Sykes, but is shot by a dying Carruthers. Believing Sykes is dead, Watters continues shooting at the FBI. Sykes escapes to the penthouse, where she stops Darwin Tremor before he can kill Ivy. Tremor escapes, and Messner, distraught over Carruthers' death, stops Ivy and Sykes on the stairwell but lets them go. Seeing the pair alive and free through her rifle scope, Watters is approached by FBI agents and gunshots are heard.

Locke and his team descend on the hotel and take Israel to the hospital. Soot escapes, while Acosta is carted away on a gurney, still alive, and Darwin is gunned down by Elmore. At the hospital, Messner learns the truth from Locke. Sparazza's heart is failing and Israel, being his illegitimate son, is the most compatible donor. Sparazza's actual identity is Freeman Heller, former undercover FBI agent who was assassinated by the FBI for blurring the lines between mobster and agent. After surviving the betrayal, Heller permanently adopted the identity of Sparazza.

Messner is furious over the unnecessary deaths of Carruthers and his fellow agents, and Locke's plan to complete the transplant, sacrificing Israel to save Sparazza and exploit his decades of criminal operations. Ordered to keep quiet, Messner instead locks himself in the operating room and takes Israel and Sparazza off life support, killing them both. As Locke and his men desperately try to break in, Messner lays his gun and badge on the floor, apparently resigning from the FBI and awaiting his punishment.

== Cast ==
- Ben Affleck as Jack Dupree, a world-weary Las Vegas bail bondsman
- Andy Garcia as Stanley Locke, the deputy director of the FBI
- Alicia Keys as Georgia Sykes, a contract killer hired and the partner of Sharice Watters
- Ray Liotta as Donald Carruthers, an FBI special agent partnered with Messner
- Jeremy Piven as Buddy "Aces" Israel, a washed-up, drug-addled magician
  - James Conkle as young Israel
- Ryan Reynolds as Richard Messner, an FBI special agent partnered with Carruthers
- Peter Berg as Peter "Pistol Pete" Deeks, a bail bondsman and former Las Vegas vice cop partnered with Hollis
- Taraji P. Henson as Sharice Watters, a contract killer and the partner of Georgia Sykes
- Chris Pine as Darwin Tremor, the eldest of the Tremor brothers, a trio of redneck, speed-freak, neo-Nazi skinhead hitmen with a penchant for scorched earth tactics
- Martin Henderson as Hollis Elmore, a bail bondsman and former Las Vegas vice cop partnered with Pistol Pete
- Jason Bateman as Rupert "Rip" Reed, an insecure, disheveled, and perverse attorney
- Common as Sir Ivy, Israel's head of security
- Joel Edgerton as Hugo Croop, an Eastern European bodyguard
- Curtis Armstrong as Morris Mecklen, Israel's business manager and acting lawyer
- David Proval as Victor "Baby Buzz" Padiche, a top Capo in the mob
- Tommy Flanagan as Lazlo Soot, a legendary Hungarian hitman and master of disguise who wears realistic latex masks
- Joseph Ruskin as Primo Sparazza, an aging Las Vegas mob boss
- Christopher Michael Holley as Beanie, Israel's favorite procurer
- Alex Rocco as Sidney Serna, Sparazza's underboss
- Néstor Carbonell as Pasquale "El Estrago" Acosta, a Spanish mercenary and torturer
- Kevin Durand as Jeeves Tremor, the largest and youngest of the Tremor brothers
- Vladimir Kulich as Dr. Sven "The Swede" Ingstrom, a renowned heart surgeon
- Maury Sterling as Lester Tremor, the smallest of the Tremor brothers
- Matthew Fox as Bill, the head of security at the Lake Tahoe

Other actors in the film include Brian Bloom as FBI agent Baker, Scott Bloom as FBI agent Wyman, Clare Carey as Laverne, Patrick St. Esprit as hotel security guard "Moustache", Mike Falkow as FBI agent Freeman Heller, Davenia McFadden as Georgia and Sharice's handler Loretta Wyman, Marianne Muellerleile as Margie Turlock, Zach Cumer as Warren Turlock, and Scott Halberstadt as the pimply hotel receptionist. Wayne Newton makes a cameo appearance as himself. Joe Carnahan, the film's writer-director, makes a cameo as an armed robber at the beginning of the film.

== Production ==
After quitting work on Mission: Impossible III, Joe Carnahan wrote a draft of what he called a version of It's a Mad, Mad, Mad, Mad World, with dark humor and heavy violence. Liza Chasin of Working Title met with Carnahan based on how much she liked his previous film, Narc. Several members of the cast signed on because of Carnahan's association with Narc, and they trained with experts to produce the majority of their own stunts in camera.

=== Casting ===
Michael Shannon was originally cast as Darwin Tremor, but Joe Carnahan fired him after he was rude to a costumer during a pre-production meeting. Carnahan cast Chris Pine within 10 seconds of his audition, later saying "He brought a levity and humor that the scene needed, and he did it simply with his physical reaction, which was the key. That’s just an innate skill set that Pine is blessed with and is in such short supply."

The film was the official acting debut for both Common and Alicia Keys, and the final film role of Joseph Ruskin before his death in December 2013.

=== Filming ===
Shooting took place mainly at the Bally's Lake Tahoe Hotel and Casino (then called the Caesars Tahoe) in Stateline, Nevada.

Filming took place from October 24 to December 15, 2005.

=== Title sequence ===
During the making of the film, Carnahan's on-set photographer captured thousands of stills. These stills (over 3,000) were given to the London-based studio VooDooDog, who found sequential photographs that could be animated into title sequences. The images were then manipulated using After Effects, giving control of camera movement and depth of field. The sequence takes inspiration from Butch Cassidy and the Sundance Kid and other 1970s movies. To give the rostrum-type hand-made feel, ink textures were filmed using a Canon 5D stills camera. Originally two sequences were produced, an opening sequence and an end sequence. However, only the end sequence was used. Creative director Paul Donnellon remarked "Yes, Joe liked the opening credits we did but after their edit, they felt it slowed the momentum of the introduction. That seems to be a big concern for filmmakers now—they're aware of the short attention span of audiences and don't want to delay the story. As a designer, I am not sure I would agree, of course. I think that if credit sequences are good and entertaining, they can hold an audience's attention".

== Soundtrack ==
The movie itself contains 18 songs, leaving only one out of the official soundtrack which was "Spottieottiedopaliscious" by Outkast. The score music was composed by Clint Mansell, who has also scored such movies as The Fountain and Requiem for a Dream. The song "First Warning" by The Prodigy appeared in the racing game Need for Speed: Undercover, and the TV show Top Gear, in their review for the car BAC Mono.

=== Track listing ===
No.	Title	Artist	Length
1.	"First Warning"	The Prodigy	4:21
2.	"Big White Cloud"	John Cale (U.S. release only)	4:05
3.	"Ace of Spades"	Motörhead	2:48
4.	"Down on the Street"	The Stooges	3:45
5.	"Play Your Cards Right"	Common feat. Bilal	3:09
6.	"Trespassing"	Skull Snaps	4:00
7.	"Segura o Sambura"	Nilton Castro	2:55
8.	"Touch Me Again"	Bernard "Pretty" Purdie	4:23
9.	"Under the Street Lamp"	Joe Bataan	2:52
10.	"I Gotcha' Back"	GZA	5:00
11.	"I Love You"	The Bees	4:33
12.	"Morte di un Soldato"	Ennio Morricone	3:12
13.	"Save Yourself"	The Make-Up	3:22
14.	"Like Light to the Flies"	Trivium	5:43
15.	"FBI"	Clint Mansell	3:00
16.	"Shell Shock"	Clint Mansell	3:09
17.	"Dead Reckoning"	Clint Mansell	3:16

== Release and reception ==
=== Box office ===
According to Box Office Mojo, the movie grossed $14,638,755 on its opening weekend (2,218 theaters, averaging $6,599 per theater). The movie grossed a total of $35,662,731 in the North American market and $21,600,709 outside the United States, making a total worldwide gross of $57,263,440.

=== Critical reception ===
Smokin' Aces has an approval rating of 31% on Rotten Tomatoes, based on 158 reviews, with an average score of 4.50/10. The site's critical consensus reads, "A violent mess of a movie, Smokin' Aces has some of Quentin Tarantino's style but not much of his wit or humor". On Metacritic, the film has a score of 45 out of 100, based on 32 critics, indicating "mixed or average reviews". Audiences surveyed by CinemaScore gave the film a grade "B" on a scale of A to F.

David Denby of The New Yorker gave a negative review of the film, stating that it has "a rabid, itchy, crack-den heartlessness to it—screw-you nihilism as a joke" and "has been made with the kind of antic violence that wins a movie the honorific title of 'black comedy.' What that indicates in this case is that nothing makes sense—and that's supposed to be cool." Peter Travers of Rolling Stone gave the film three out of four stars; although he noted that the film has "too many characters and too many plot strands" as well as an abrupt ending, he stated that the film is "shamelessly and unapologetically a guy movie... Carnahan can still fire up action and laughs like nobody's business."

During a rare talk session for Princeton University's series of film screenings in October 2016, director Terrence Malick praised the film, stating that it was "very well directed" and impressive in how it was able to balance numerous plotlines.

=== Home media ===
Smokin' Aces was released on DVD and HD DVD on April 17, 2007, and sold 1,853,397 DVD units which produced a revenue of $35,714,831, or more than double the movie's budget. It was later released on Blu-ray on January 19, 2010, and then on Ultra HD Blu-ray on May 3, 2022.

== Prequel ==
On July 17, 2007, director Joe Carnahan announced that production had been approved by Universal Pictures for a second Smokin' Aces film, which he would not direct. The film is a prequel to the original and was released straight to DVD on January 19, 2010.
