= KOG =

Kog is a village in Slovenia.

KOG may refer to:

- KOG Studios, a South Korean company that specializes in developing online role-playing games
- Kokomo Opalescent Glass Works, an American manufacturer of glass
- Kongsberg Gruppen (ticker symbol: KOG), a Norwegian defense contractor and maritime automation supplier
- KOG (AM), an AM radio station (originally KZC) licensed from 1921 to 1923
- An acronym for Knights of Guinevere, an Australian animated web series

== See also ==
- Cog (disambiguation)
