= Quentin Plair =

American actor (born 1988)

- Born: Quentin Plair; 1988 (age 37–38); Hartford, Connecticut, U.S.
- Occupation: Actor

Quentin Plair (born 1988) is an American actor. He has appeared in such shows as Tiny Beautiful Things, Welcome to Chippendales and Roswell, New Mexico. He also played Emperor in the 2020 miniseries The Good Lord Bird.

In film, he played Marquis Cooper in the upcoming film Not Without Hope (2025).

== Filmography ==
=== Film ===
| Year | Title | Role | Notes |
|---|---|---|---|
| 2013 | The Final Hour | Isaiah Williams | Short film |
| 2015 | Rainbow Shots | Unknown | Short film |
| 2016 | Dirty Grandpa | African Studies Professor | Uncredited |
| 2017 | Burning Sands | Quincy | |
| 2025 | Not Without Hope | Marquis Cooper | |

=== Television ===
| Year | Title | Role | Notes |
|---|---|---|---|
| 2011 | Trinity Goodheart | Boy #2 | TV movie |
| 2014 | Drumline: A New Beat | Quentin | TV movie |
| 2015 | Born Again Virgin | Guy #1 | 1 episode |
| 2015 | Justice by Any Means | Devaughndre Broussard | 1 episode |
| 2017 | Saint & Sinners | Tyrone Bennett | 1 episode |
| 2017 | Dates (the Series) | Jesse | 1 episode |
| 2017–2018 | The Quad | Miles Thrumond | 11 episodes |
| 2019 | Hello Cupid 3.0 | Terry/Terrence | 8 episodes |
| 2019 | The Good Doctor | Andre Fields | 1 episode |
| 2020 | The Good Lord Bird | Emperor | Miniseries |
| 2021–2022 | Roswell, New Mexico | Dallas | 17 episodes |
| 2022–2023 | Welcome to Chippendales | Otis | 4 episodes |
| 2023 | Tiny Beautiful Things | Danny Kinkade | Miniseries |
| 2024 | Genius | Grant X | 4 episodes |
| 2024 | Apples Never Fall | Tyler Cruz | 2 episodes |
| 2025–present | Chad Powers | Coach Byrd | Main role |
