= Tommy Savas =

American actor and producer (born 1984)

Tommy A. Savas
- Born: December 20, 1984 (age 41); Harlem, New York, United States
- Occupation: Actor
- Years active: 2001–present

Tommy A. Savas (born December 20, 1984) is an American actor and producer. He is known for Roger Dodger (2002), Seven Days (2007) and Extra Butter, Please (2011).

== Early life ==
Savas was born in Harlem, New York, United States. He was raised in Cresskill, New Jersey, the youngest of four children where, as a child, he showed a strong interest in acting and theatre. His grandfather fought in World War II.

By the age of six, he had studied improvisation and acting with Susan Dias Karnovsky and appeared in commercials and HBO and PBS children's productions. Between school work and soccer games, Savas studied privately with Joseph Daly, and at HB Studios in New York under Trudi Stible.

He spent time between New York and Los Angeles where he studied with Robert Lyons and Lynette McNeil, and had comedy training with Shari Shaw. Savas continued to hone his acting skills appearing in local theatre productions and in sketch comedy at the HA! Comedy Club in New York.

== Career ==
His big break came at age 15 when he was selected from 15,000 actors to play the role of Xavier, AJ Soprano’s high school friend in the HBO series, The Sopranos. After The Sopranos, Savas had a guest starring role in Law and Order: Special Victims Unit and a part in the Tribeca Film Festival award-winning film, Roger Dodger.

After graduating from high school, Savas moved out to Los Angeles to pursue his already burgeoning career and was quickly chosen to appear in Cold Case, Without a Trace, Shark, The New Adventures of Old Christine, General Hospital and many others. He can also be seen in many national commercials such as Gillette, Nesquik, Guitar Hero, Pizza Hut and Subway.

Savas formed Reckless Tortuga with a small group of friends in 2009 as a means of continually creating things and working even if they were not booking work professionally. Reckless Tortuga became a popular YouTube web-based comedy channel, where he has a recurring role as Damian in the webseries, The Online Gamer.

In 2014, Savas played Cossetti in Michael Bay's post-apocalyptic TV series The Last Ship. He also played the series regular Dashiell Greer in Katherine Heigl's NBC drama, State of Affairs, which was premiered in November 2014.

In 2015, Savas co-wrote and starred in the dark comedy Bad Roomies with Patrick Renna. The movie was partially funded through Kickstarter ($75,000 was raised).

In 2016, Savas was cast as Reggie in the ABC comedy pilot The Fluffy Shop, co-written by and starring Gabriel Iglesias.

Savas jokingly said that Shia LaBeouf stole his career after they screen tested against each other for the role of a young Robert Downey Jr. in the movie A Guide to Recognizing your Saints and Lebouf was given the part.

== Personal life ==
Savas occasionally works as a substitute teacher and has said that if acting fell through, he would love to be a teacher.

Gary Oldman is an actor who Savas admires for his ability to play many different characters.

== Filmography ==
=== Film ===
Year	Title	Role	Notes
2007	Seven Days	Max	Short movie
2009	Poolside	Doug	Short movie
2015	Bad Roomies	Ray (Raymond)	Movie
2017	It Happened One Valentine's	Matty Sellers	Direct-to-video film
2021	Luv U Cuz	—N/a	Producer; Animated short movie
2022	Mother of the Dawn	—N/a	Producer; Documentary
2025	C.O.G.	—N/a	Director Movie

=== Television ===
Year	Title	Role	Notes
2001	The Sopranos	Xavier	2 episodes
2002	Law & Order: Special Victims Unit	Sanjeev	Episode: "Deception"
2004	Arrested Development	Bully	Episode: "Beef Consomme"
2006	Cold Case	Tommy Dicenzio	Episode:"Frank’s Best"
2006	The New Adventures of Old Christine	Mark	Episode: "Open Water"
2007	Shark	Kenny Leary	Episode: "Backfire"
2008	General Hospital	Young Sonny	2 episodes
2009	Raising the Bar	Owen Clark	Episode: "The Curious Case of Kellerman's Button"
2010	CSI: NY	Rick Contoursi	Episode: "Tales from the Undercard"
2010	Justified	Ronson	Episode: "Fathers and Sons"
2011	House	Cruz	Episode: "Last Temptation"
2011	Prime Suspect	Bugsy	Episode: "Shame"
2012	Castle	Marcus Hiatt	Episode: "An Embarrassment of Bitches"
2009–2012	Psycho Girlfriend	Seth	21 episodes
2012	Hollywood Heights	Ray	9 episodes
2011–2012	Extra Butter, Please	Various	48 episodes
2013	The Online Gamer	Damien/Tirion Fordring	16 episodes
2014–2018	The Last Ship	Cossetti	
2014–2015	State of Affairs	Dashiell Greer	
2017	Hell's Kitchen	Himself	Episode: "Fusion/Confusion"
2018	9-1-1	Daniel	Episode: "Stuck"
2019	Dirty John	Max	Episode: "This Young Woman Fought Like Hell"
2022–2023	National Treasure: Edge of History	Dr. Zeke Hudson	5 episodes
