= COGS =

COGS, used as an acronym, may refer to:

- Cost of goods sold, an accountancy metric
- City of Greater Shepparton
- Community of Genoa Schools sports teams, see Genoa, Illinois#Education
- The University of Birmingham's School of Computer Science departmental society
- The University of Sussex School of Cognitive and Computing Sciences
- The Centre of Geographic Sciences at the Nova Scotia Community College

Cogs may also refer to:

- Cog (ship)
- Cogs, parts of a gear system
- Cogs (video game), a puzzle game

== See also ==
- Cog (disambiguation)
