= CoG =

CoG may refer to:

- Center of gravity
- Central of Georgia Railway
- Choice of Games
- Continuity of Government
- Covenant of the Goddess
- Center of government

== See also ==
- Cog (disambiguation)
