= State of Affairs (TV series) =

2014 American thriller television series

- Genre: Drama; Thriller; Espionage
- Created by: Alexi Hawley
- Starring: Katherine Heigl; Alfre Woodard; Adam Kaufman; Sheila Vand; Cliff Chamberlain; Tommy Savas; David Harbour
- Composer: Toby Chu
- Country of origin: United States
- Original language: English
- No. of seasons: 1
- No. of episodes: 13

Production
- Executive producers: Joe Carnahan; Katherine Heigl; Robert Simonds; Nancy Heigl; Sophie Watts; Henry A. Crumpton; Rodney Faraon; Julia Franz; Dario Scardapane
- Production locations: New York (Pilot); Los Angeles
- Camera setup: Single-camera
- Running time: 45 minutes
- Production companies: Universal Television; Abishag Productions; Aardwolf Productions; STXtelevision

Original release
- Network: NBC
- Release: November 17, 2014 – February 16, 2015

State of Affairs is an American espionage thriller television series created by Alexi Hawley, which premiered on NBC on November 17, 2014, during the 2014–15 American television season until February 16, 2015. The series stars Katherine Heigl as CIA analyst Charleston Tucker, who is tasked with assembling and presenting the President's Daily Briefing on the most vital security issues facing the country, and Alfre Woodard as the first black woman to be elected President of the United States, Constance Payton. After one season, NBC cancelled State of Affairs.

== Cast and characters ==
=== Main ===
- Katherine Heigl as Charleston "Charlie" Whitney Tucker, a CIA analyst, responsible for the President's Daily Brief.
- Alfre Woodard as Constance Payton, President of the United States.
- Adam Kaufman as Lucas Newsome, CIA Analyst and Briefer for the CIA Director.
- Sheila Vand as Maureen James, CIA Analyst and Briefer for the Secretary of Defense and Charlie's best friend.
- Cliff Chamberlain as Kurt Tannen, CIA Analyst and Briefer for the State Department.
- Tommy Savas as Dashiell Greer, CIA Analyst and Briefer to FBI, various agencies within the United States Intelligence Community.
- David Harbour as David Patrick, White House Chief of Staff.

=== Recurring ===
- Derek Ray as Jack Dawkins, CIA paramilitary officer, JSOC operator and former Navy SEAL.
- James Remar as Syd Vaslo, former CIA case officer who runs a private sector "clandestine service".
- Farshad Farahat as Omar Abdul Fatah, terrorist responsible for the attack on the diplomatic motorcade that resulted in a gun battle that killed the President's son in Kabul.
- Mark Tallman as Aaron Payton, deceased son of the President and fiancé of Charlie.
- Chris McKenna as Nick Vera, CIA case officer and a retired Marine Raider Regiment operator.
- Nestor Carbonell as Raymond Navarro, Director of the CIA.
- Courtney B. Vance as Marshall Payton, pro bono counsel for advocacy groups and First Gentleman of the United States.
- Christopher Michael Holley as Earl Givens, CIA analyst, Operations Center Senior Duty Officer.
- Melinda McGraw as Senator Kyle Green, President Payton's rival.
- Jenny Pellicer as Emily/Melissa Anchez, mysterious woman of many identities who works with Syd.
- Nick Shakoour as Aleek Al Moosari, jihadist who works for Fatah.
- Anil Kumar as Professor Ahmad Ahmadi.
- Cress Williams as Dale Scott, FBI agent.
- Adam Arkin as Victor Gantry, businessman and former CIA case officer.
- Rex Linn as Senator Burke, Senate Majority Leader.
- Matthew Lillard as DD Banks, Deputy Director of the CIA.

== Episodes ==
No.	Title	Directed by	Written by	Original release date	U.S. viewers (millions)
1	"Pilot"	Joe Carnahan	Story by : Alexi Hawley; Teleplay by : Joe Carnahan & Susan Morris and Alexi Hawley	November 17, 2014	8.69
It is the one-year death anniversary of Aaron Payton, the President's son and Charlie's fiance. When preparing the day's President's Daily Briefing (PDB), the team is made aware of the abduction of an American doctor in Kenya and the possibility that he will be killed in a few hours. But the JSOC team tracking Omar Abdul Fatah feels they've a good possibility of killing him. But in the absence of confirmation and that they cannot get the other senior leadership of Fatah's group, Charlie refuses to add it in the PDB. The CIA Director feels that she has disobeyed orders and therefore suspends her. However, she meets with the President and convinces her that the life of the hostage is more important, leading the President to order the JSOC team to rescue the doctor instead.
2	"Secrets & Lies"	Joe Carnahan	Edward Allen Bernero	November 24, 2014	5.40
When a Russian sub hacking into U.S undersea cables in the Bering Sea gets damaged in an Arctic cyclone, the CIA asset onboard sends a distress call. The U.S. tries to save him, but when it seems the situation might escalate into a war with Russia, the President orders Charlie to convince the asset to sink the submarine. Meanwhile Charlie is being haunted by the fact that Abdul Fatah was a CIA asset and she was his handler when the attack on the President's son happened. But she still has so many unanswered questions.
3	"Half the Sky"	Sarah Pia Anderson	Kim Clements	December 1, 2014	7.04
When Boko Haram kidnaps 20 girls returning from a soccer match, Charlie puts it at the top of the PDB. The President orders her to find out where the girls are kept but tells her that the U.S. cannot get involved directly in this fight. Meanwhile the President is meeting with the Chinese Premier at Camp David. Charlie finds out that China has oil interests near the site where the girls are held captive. She convinces the President to persuade the Premier to use a small security team belonging to a PMC (Controlled Outcomes) for oil refinery security. But the team is actually authorized to rescue the girls using the pretense of refinery security as cover. Meanwhile, it seems there are more secrets about what Nick Vera and Charleston were involved in.
4	"Bang, Bang"	Nelson McCormick	Sarah Kucserka & Veronica West	December 8, 2014	6.30
Charlie and Nick both receive a threatening text that sends Nick on an investigation to find the source once and for all. Charlie flashes back to her first interactions with Fatah on Midnight City. Meanwhile, President Payton's rival Senator Green reveals just enough about the upcoming senatorial motorcade attack report to cause her to question Charlie's faithfulness. Charlie and team have to employ Jack Dawkins to contain a smallpox contamination in Panama while avoiding detection in the country. Kurt continues to pine for Maureen but an unexpected kindness distracts her from his attentions.
5	"Ar Rissalah"	Bill Eagles	Devon Greggory	December 15, 2014	6.18
Now that a portion of the motorcade attack report has been leaked, President Payton has a lot of questions for Nick Vera. Unfortunately, he seems to be MIA. As Charlie searches for him, she flashes back to the hours before and during the motorcade attack, and we learn another secret that she's been withholding from President Payton. After an American reporter is granted a rare, exclusive interview, Charlie and team must work to contain the footage as an urgent matter of national security. Kurt finally works up the courage to show Maureen his cards, while D.P. reaches out to an old friend to squash the motorcade attack report before it's released in its entirety.
6	"Masquerade"	Joe Carnahan	Adam R. Perlman	December 22, 2014	4.58
Charlie and Maureen accompany President Payton to Qatar on a diplomatic trip. What begins as a standard mission of diplomacy becomes a disaster when a Qatar national infiltrates the American embassy claiming to be CIA. Constance tasks Charlie to find out if he's telling the truth. Meanwhile Lucas, Dash and Kurt work to track down Al Moosari, believed to be a direct link to Omar Fatah. Kurt has a run-in with a walk-in who claims to have found a valuable backdoor into highly valuable communications. Nick, still MIA, is violently interrogated by a masked man. Charlie finally takes desperate and dangerous measures to remember the events of the motercade attack.
7	"Bellerophon"	P.J. Pesce	Matthew Lau	January 5, 2015	4.47
A young male member of Anonymous (group) manages to infiltrate the White House and vandalize a painting. In response his teacher is arrested and 4chan begins trolling the CIA by copying the extremists and posing with photos of the Islamic symbol next to landmarks.
8	"Ghosts"	Félix Enríquez Alcalá	Linda Burstyn	January 12, 2015	3.62
After FARC (The Revolutionary Forces of Colombia) kidnap Jack Dawkins from a Panamanian prison and hold him for ransom, the team has to pinpoint his location and extract him before time runs out. Charlie comes back to Langley to coordinate the Bellerophon op, while Maureen struggles to fill her shoes as President Payton's briefer. Constance and Marshall fiercely debate whether or not to use Dawkins' potential rescue as a political win against her mudslinging opponent, Kyle Green. There are hundreds of thousands of Ar Rissalah photos now and the team is overwhelmed with the sheer number of possible leads. To complicate matters further, the DC bomb squad removes a suspicious backpack marked with the Ar Rissalah symbol in front of the Washington Monument. Back in the Middle East, Nick and Al Moosari are on the move to meet with Fatah, but not before Nick is put through a number of tests.
9	"Cry Havoc"	Joshua Butler	Heidi McAdams	January 19, 2015	4.49
Charlie and the PDB team race to prove that sorority girl Stacy Dover (guest star Gracie Dzienny) is, in fact, an active member of Ar Rissalah's American terrorist cell. Amidst the high-stakes investigation, Charlie is forced to confront the fact that one of her closest allies may have betrayed her. Meanwhile, Operation Bellerophon is in full swing as Nick Vera gets one step closer to contact with Omar Fattah. But Charlie's efforts to bring down Ar Rissalah may not be able to prevent an attack on the homeland.
10	"The War at Home"	Nelson McCormick	Susan Morris & Ari Briskman	January 26, 2015	4.41
The team races to find a terrorist cell's missing bombs, and Charlie enlists the aid of a former adversary in the effort. Meanwhile, domestic fear and suspicion escalate as President Payton faces a new political threat, and an operation is jeopardized.
11	"The Faithful"	Ernest Dickerson	Zach Ayers & Adam Gaines	February 2, 2015	4.73
A manhunt begins for a terrorist who escaped custody. Meanwhile, President Payton makes a deal with the media to protect a top-secret operation, but her own secrets may be publicly exposed in the process; and Nick and Fatah stay at a terrorist stronghold, awaiting the arrival of a dangerous man.
12	"Here and Now"	Ben Bray	Sarah Kucserka & Veronica West	February 9, 2015	4.04
Nick finally has Sheikh Hakam in his sights, and Charlie and President Payton must decide what sacrifices to make and how far to go in order to bring down the most wanted terrorist in the world. Charlie and the briefing team work with Nick on a plan to kill Fatah and Hakam. But when an unexpected obstacle is put in their path, Charlie finds herself at odds with the President over what steps to take next. Meanwhile, President Payton struggles to balance the top secret mission with the annual Correspondent's Dinner at the White House, but Senator Burke has other plans as he releases top secret intel that could endanger the entire mission. And as Charlie liaises with Nick in the present, we learn more about their romantic past together. Kurt finds he may have gotten in a little too deep with Victor Gantry and the Krieg Group.
13	"Deadcheck"	Joe Carnahan	Story by : Dario Scardapane & Samantha Stratton; Teleplay by : Joe Carnahan & Michael Perri	February 16, 2015	4.47
With the President's support and her 7th floor team backing her, Charlie quits the CIA in order to try to keep her promise of tracking down and killing Omar Fatah before he and Ar Rissalah can continue their devastating attacks on the homeland. Meanwhile, President Payton faces adversity after Victor Gantry, the head of TKG, threatens to tell the public that Sheikh Hakam doesn't exist. David Patrick, unaware of the TKG meetings, threatens to quit after being left in the dark and the 7th floor team gathers to do whatever they can to help Charlie, who is off the grid, halfway across the world.

== Development ==
NBC acquired the rights of the series in September 2013. In January 2014, the network announced the project had received a pilot order. The pilot was ordered to series in May 2014. In August 2014, Ed Bernero left his position as showrunner before the show's premiere because of "creative differences" with fellow executive producer Joe Carnahan.

== Reception ==
=== Critical reception ===
State of Affairs received negative reviews from critics, although Alfre Woodard's performance garnered praise. On Metacritic the show has a score of 43 out of 100, based on 28 critics, indicating "mixed or average reviews". On Rotten Tomatoes the show holds a rating of 26%, based on 42 reviews, with an average rating of 5.2/10. The critical consensus reads: "State of Affairs benefits from Alfre Woodard's talent, but this overly serious show is dragged down by Katherine Heigl's unsympathetic character and a surfeit of unintentional laughs."

Amy Amatangelo of Boston Herald gave the premiere a grade of "C", stating that "Alfre Woodard isn’t given a lot to do as President Constance Payton in the premiere, but, unlike Heigl, she does have the gravitas for the role, and the show would be wise to use her more. The series sets up some interesting revelations in the hour’s final moments. They potentially could make the show more interesting. But for now the state of affairs is rather mediocre."

=== Ratings ===
No.	Title	Air date	Rating/share (18–49)	Viewers (millions)	DVR (18–49)	DVR viewers (millions)	Total (18–49)	Total viewers (millions)
1	"Pilot"	November 17, 2014	2.2/7	8.69	—N/a	3.56	—N/a	12.26
2	"Secrets & Lies"	November 24, 2014	1.5/4	5.41	—N/a	2.01	—N/a	7.42
3	"Half the Sky"	December 1, 2014	1.6/5	7.04	0.8	3.18	2.4	10.22
4	"Bang, Bang"	December 8, 2014	1.6/5	6.30	—N/a	2.75	—N/a	9.05
5	"Ar Rissalah"	December 15, 2014	1.5/5	6.18	0.7	2.77	2.2	8.96
6	"Masquerade"	December 22, 2014	1.0/3	4.58	0.6	2.64	1.6	7.22
7	"Bellerophon"	January 5, 2015	1.0/3	4.47	0.7	2.94	1.7	7.41
8	"Ghosts"	January 12, 2015	0.7/2	3.57	0.7	2.66	1.4	6.21
9	"Cry Havoc"	January 19, 2015	1.1/3	4.49	0.7	2.99	1.8	7.47
10	"The War at Home"	January 26, 2015	1.0/3	4.41	0.7	2.47	1.7	6.88
11	"The Faithful"	February 2, 2015	1.1/3	4.73	—N/a	—N/a	—N/a	—N/a
12	"Here and Now"	February 9, 2015	1.0/3	4.04	0.7	2.70	1.7	6.74
13	"Deadcheck"	February 16, 2015	1.0/3	4.47	0.6	2.36	1.6	6.83

=== Awards and nominations ===
Year	Award	Category	Nominee	Result	Ref
2015	NAACP Image Award	Outstanding Supporting Actress in a Drama Series	Alfre Woodard	Nominated	

== Broadcast ==
In Canada, State of Affairs airs on Global at the same time as the original broadcast. In the Middle East, each episode of State of Affairs aired on OSN one week after the original broadcast. In Australia, the series was picked up by Seven Network, and debuted on 19 February 2015. In New Zealand it will air on TV3 in 2015. In India, it aired on Colors Infinity in 2015. In Germany, it was aired on NBCUniversal International Networks’s Universal Channel and its debut premiere on September 16, 2015.

By the 2014-15 year, State of Affairs was also picked up by 13th Street in France, Czech Republic, and Denmark.
