= List of horror films of the 2020s =

Horror films originally released in the 2020s include the following. Often there may be considerable overlap particularly between horror and other genres (including, thriller, suspense, slasher, and sci-fi); the list should attempt to document films which are more closely related to horror, even if they bend genres.

== List of horror films of the 2020s ==
- List of horror films of 2020
- List of horror films of 2021
- List of horror films of 2022
- List of horror films of 2023
- List of horror films of 2024
- List of horror films of 2025
- List of horror films of 2026

== Upcoming and proposed ==
Title	Director	Cast	Country	Subgenre/notes
2026
Werwulf	Robert Eggers	Aaron Taylor-Johnson, Lily-Rose Depp, Willem Dafoe, Ralph Ineson	United States	Period gothic horror
2027
Pendulum	Mark Heyman	Joseph Gordon-Levitt, Phoebe Dynevor, Jacki Weaver, Norman Reedus	United States	Mystery thriller horror
Crawl 2	Alexandre Aja	Mason Gooding, Emily Rudd	United States	Natural horror
Skeletons	JT Mollner	Brie Larson, Kyle Gallner, Willa Fitzgerald, Ione Skye, Keith Carradine, John Goodman	United States	Horror film
A Quiet Place Part III	John Krasinski	Emily Blunt, Cillian Murphy, Millicent Simmonds, Noah Jupe, Jack O'Connell, Katy O'Brian, Jason Clarke	United States	Sci-fi horror
Monitor	Matt Black, Ryan Polly	Brittany O'Grady, Taz Skylar, Viveik Kalra, Ines Høysæter Asserson, Gunner Willis, Sara Alexander, Camila Bejarano Wahlgren	United States	Horror film
The Exorcist: Martyrs	Mike Flanagan	Scarlett Johansson, Diane Lane, Jacobi Jupe, Chiwetel Ejiofor, Laurence Fishburne, Sasha Calle, John Leguizamo, Hamish Linklater, Carl Lumbly, John Gallagher Jr., Benjamin Pajak, Carla Gugino	United States	Supernatural horror
Possession	Parker Finn	Margaret Qualley, Callum Turner, Diego Calva, Paul Dano	United States	Psychological horror
The Revenge of La Llorona	Santiago Menghini	Monica Raymund, Jay Hernandez, Raymond Cruz, Edy Ganem	United States	Supernatural horror
The Third Parent	David Michaels	Rob Lowe, Roselyn Sánchez, Crispin Glover	United States	Supernatural horror
Paranormal Activity	Ian Tuason	Chase Yi, Sonia Mena, Maya Da Costa	United States	Supernatural horror
Untitled Blair Witch film	Dylan Clark		United States	Supernatural horror
Sleepover	Jacob Chase		United States	Horror film
Winnie-the-Pooh: Blood and Honey 3 – The Lost Years	Scott Chambers	Josephine Blazier, George Drogo, Richard Stanley, Lewis Santer, Jacob Marshfield, Roger L. Jackson, Kira Reed, Zena Donnelly, Leo Harris, Paul W. Black, Carla Lisa Roberts, Chrissie Wunna, Danielle Ronald, Cris Parker, Kevin Hummell, Belle Taylor, Scott Chambers	United Kingdom	Slasher film
Jason	Steve Miner		United States	Slasher film
2028
Evil Dead Wrath	Francis Galluppi	Charlotte Hope, Jessica McNamee, Zach Gilford, Josh Helman, Ella Newton, Elizabeth Cullen, Ella Oliphant	United States	Supernatural horror
Final Destination 7	Michiel Blanchart		United States	Supernatural horror
Freddy the 13th	Dan Trachtenberg		United States	Animated comedy horror
Ghost Market	Trevor Jimenez, Jesse Andrews		United States	Animated comedy horror
Gladys	TBA	Amy Madigan	United States	Supernatural mystery horror
Gremlins 3	Chris Columbus		United States	Comedy horror
Heart Eyes 2	Josh Ruben		United States	Romantic comedy Slasher
The Mandela Catalogue	Alex Kister		United States	Analog horror
TBA
10-31	Gigi Saul Guerrero		United States	
16 States	Fede Álvarez		United States	Zombie thriller
Film based on Abraham's Boys	Natasha Kermani		United States	Action horror
Adaptation of "Adrift"	Darren Aronofsky	Jared Leto	United States	Supernatural horror thriller
Arcane	Corin Hardy		United States	Monster
Bjorn of the Dead	Elza Kephart	Bruce Dickinson	United States	Horror comedy
Blood Count	Peter Ramsey		United States	Neo-noir vampire thriller
Christine	Bryan Fuller		United States	Supernatural horror
Untitled Chucky film	Don Mancini	Brad Dourif	United States	Slasher
A Corpse in Kensington	Brian Patrick Butler	Derrick Acosta, Michael Madsen, Ryan Bollman, Vinny Curran, Kimberly Weinberger, Savannah Porter, Sutheshna Mani, Alex Chernow	United States	Psychological horror
Creep 3	Patrick Brice	Mark Duplass	United States	Found footage psychological horror
Dark Army	Paul Feig		United States	Monster
Adaptation of Dracul	Andy Muschietti		United States	Horror
Dracula	Chloé Zhao		United States	Monster, sci-fi, western
Elijah	Alexandre Aja		United States	Horror thriller
Frankenstein	TBA		United States	Monster
Hellsing	TBA		United States	Action horror
Howdy, Neighbor	Allisyn Snyder	Matthew Scott Montgomery, Grant Jordan, Debby Ryan, Alyson Stoner, Kevin Chamberlin, Tim Bagley, Shayne Topp, Damien Haas	United States	Horror-thriller
Adaptation of Infidel	Hany Abu-Assad		United States	Supernatural horror
Little Monsters	Josh Cooley		United States	Live-action animated hybrid, children's fantasy, monster
Meet Jimmy	David-Jan Bronsgeest		United States	Supernatural horror
Memetic	TBA		United States	Psychological horror
Monster Mash	Matt Stawski		United States	Monster, musical
Most Evil	Daniel Robbins		United States	Horror-thriller
Mother Nature	Jamie Lee Curtis		United States	Horror
Night of the Comet	TBA		United States	Sci-fi horror
Open Wounds	Ronald Krauss	Jack Kilmer, Paris Jackson, Eric Roberts, Lambert Houston, Renata Notni, Richie Radichi, Jay Giannone	United States	Horror thriller
Pumpkinhead	TBA		United States	Horror
Reunion	Matt Bettinelli-Olpin, Tyler Gillett		United States	High school monster
Scary Stories to Tell in the Dark 2	André Øvredal	Zoe Colletti, Michael Garza, Natalie Ganzhorn, Dean Norris	United States	Supernatural horror
Screamboat 2: Nothing Stays Dead	Steven LaMorte		United States	Horror comedy
Shelter	Bishal Dutta		United States	Apocalyptic horror
Shhh	Gustavo Cooper		United States	Horror thriller
Sinkhole	TBA		United States	Supernatural horror
Smile 3	David Bruckner		United States	
Spooked	Peter Foott		United States	Horror comedy
Adaptation of Stray Dogs	TBA		United States	CGI animated horror-thriller
Terrifier 4	TBA		United States	Slasher
The Blindings	Alexis Jacknow		United States	Horror-thriller
The Bride of Frankenstein	TBA		United States	Monster
The Culling	David F. Sandberg		United States	Supernatural horror
The Dark Half	Alex Ross Perry		United States	Horror-thriller
The Hill's Have Eyes for You	Eli Craig		United States	Horror, rom-com
The Invisible Woman	Elizabeth Banks		United States	
The Lost Boys	Jonathan Entwistle	Noah Jupe, Jaeden Martell	United States	Horror comedy
The One	Kevin Armento, Jaki Bradley	Nicholas Hoult, Melissa Barrera, Lana Condor, Riley Keough	United States	
Adaptation of The Season of Passage	Mike Flanagan		United States	Sci-fi horror
The Thing	TBA		United States	Sci-fi, horror-thriller
The Tommyknockers	TBA		United States	
Adaptation of The Troop	E.L. Katz		United States	Horror
Adaptation of The Unsound	David F. Sandberg		United States	Psychological horror
Adaptation of Throttle	TBA		United States	
Van Helsing	Julius Avery		United States	Horror thriller
Video Killed the Radio Star	Brad Watson	Harriet Cains, Luke Brandon Field	United Kingdom	
Whisper	Julian Terry		United States	
Year 2	Steven C. Miller	Frank Grillo, Katrina Law	United States	Horror-thriller
Zombies vs. Gladiators	Clive Barker		United States	Zombie horror
