= Corey Smith (American football) =

American football player (1979–2009)

No. 98, 71, 58, 93
- Position: Defensive end

Personal information
- Born: October 2, 1979; Richmond, Virginia, U.S.
- Died: March 2009 (aged 29) near Clearwater, Florida, U.S.
- Listed height: 6 ft 2 in (1.88 m)
- Listed weight: 250 lb (113 kg)

Career information
- High school: Marshall (Richmond)
- College: NC State
- NFL draft: 2002: undrafted

Career history
- Tampa Bay Buccaneers (2002–2004); → Berlin Thunder (2004); San Francisco 49ers (2004–2005); Detroit Lions (2006–2008)

Awards and highlights
- Super Bowl champion (XXXVII); Second-team All-ACC (2001)

Career NFL statistics
- Total tackles: 83
- Sacks: 8.5
- Forced fumbles: 6
- Fumble recoveries: 1
- Interceptions: 1
- Stats at Pro Football Reference

Corey Dominique Smith (October 2, 1979 – March 1, 2009) was an American professional football player who was a defensive end in the National Football League (NFL). He was signed by the Tampa Bay Buccaneers as an undrafted free agent in 2002. He played college football for the NC State Wolfpack. Smith also played for the San Francisco 49ers and Detroit Lions.

== Boating incident and disappearance ==
On March 1, 2009, the United States Coast Guard reported that a 21-foot (6.4 m) fishing boat was missing off the Gulf Coast near Clearwater Pass, Florida. The boat was carrying four passengers, including Smith; Marquis Cooper, a member of the Oakland Raiders; as well as Nick Schuyler and Will Bleakley, former University of South Florida football players. The four men left Clearwater Pass on February 28 at 6:30 a.m. and were expected to return later that night. The Coast Guard Cutter USCGC Tornado began searching for the missing boat shortly after midnight on March 1, 2009. By 1:35 p.m. EST on March 2, 2009, the boat was located, overturned, with Schuyler clinging to it. The other three passengers were not found. According to Schuyler, Cooper separated from the group at 5:30 AM, with Smith disappearing about an hour later. 24 hours later, Bleakley became unresponsive, and despite Schuyler giving him CPR, he also disappeared. Schuyler was found less than six hours later. The search for the three men who remained missing ended at sundown on March 3, 2009. Friends and relatives organized a private search which was called off several days later.

Smith's family has established the Corey D. Smith Memorial Scholarship Fund in his honor. The Detroit Lions held a memorial service for him on March 21, 2009. The Detroit Lions announced they would retire Smith's #93 during the 2009 season in honor of him.

An investigation by the Florida Fish and Wildlife Conservation Commission determined that the incident was caused when the vessel was improperly anchored, and the boat capsized after Marquis Cooper tried to throttle forward in an attempt to pry loose the anchor.

Smith was named the 2009 recipient of the Detroit Lions/Detroit Sports Broadcasters Association/Pro Football Writers Association's Media-Friendly "Good Guy" Award. The Good Guy Award is given yearly to the Detroit Lions player who shows consideration to, and cooperation with the media at all times during the course of the season. His family accepted the award on behalf of the late NFL player.

== Media portrayal ==
Smith is portrayed by Terrence Terrell in the 2025 film Not Without Hope.

== See also ==
- List of gridiron football players who died during their careers
