= Change of gauge (disambiguation) =

Change of gauge is the process of converting a railway from one rail gauge to another.

Change of gauge or gauge change may also refer to:

- Change of gauge (aviation), change of aircraft without changing the flight number
- Break-of-gauge a location where two railroad lines of different gauge meet
- Bogie exchange, a system for operating railway wagons on two or more gauges by switching bogies
- Variable gauge, a system using adjustable wheel sets where the gauge is altered by driving the train through a gauge changer
- Dual gauge, the use of additional rails are laid to accommodate two different gauges on the same track
- Track gauge conversion, replacing a railway track of one track gauge with a railway track of another track gauge

== See also ==
- Gauge fixing, a mathematical procedure for coping with redundant degrees of freedom in field variables
