= Christopher Michael Holley =

American actor (born 1971)

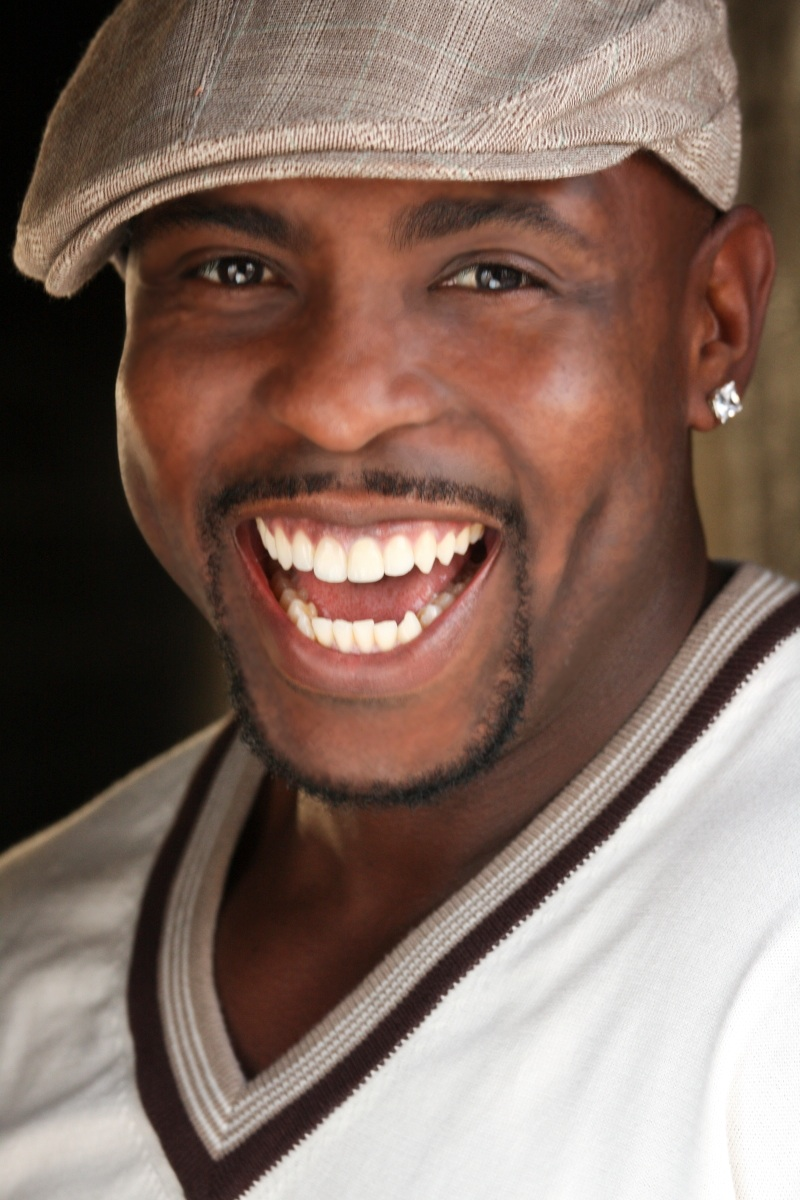
2009 portrait

Christopher Michael Holley (born November 23, 1971) is an American actor known for his role as Beanie in Smokin' Aces.

He was born in Minot, North Dakota and at one time attended Wheatland Union High School. His first acting role was an uncredited appearance in the 1995 film Black Panther. He has since appeared in a number of other films including Smokin' Aces, where he appeared as Beanie. He also appeared in the 2010 direct-to-video sequel, Smokin' Aces 2: Assassins' Ball. He has had a number of small roles in films like 21, Pride and Glory, and the VOD 2014 film Stretch. He has appeared on a number of television shows including Trauma and Those Who Kill. He will also appear in the upcoming NBC show State of Affairs.

== Film and television roles ==
| Year | Name | Role |
|---|---|---|
| 1995 | Black Panther | Uncredited |
| 2006 | Faceless | Agent Curtis Lehane |
| 2006 | Smokin' Aces | Beanie |
| 2007 | Cash Cow | The Record Producer |
| 2007 | Cover | DL Father |
| 2007 | The Road | Cleophis |
| 2008 | 21 | Philosophical Gambler |
| 2008 | Team Room | Coach Ben Eckhardt |
| 2008 | Pride and Glory | Detective Miller |
| 2009 | Sensored | Officer Miles |
| 2009 | Nite Tales (TV) | Thug 2 |
| 2010 | The Invited | Lt. Williams |
| 2010 | Smokin' Aces 2: Assassins' Ball | Special Agent Malcolm Little |
| 2010 | Trauma (TV) | Roofer |
| 2011 | The Lot | Hank |
| 2011 | Left and loose in THE LOT | Unknown Role |
| 2014 | Those Who Kill | Lieutenant Mike Dunn |
| 2014 | Stretch | Caesar |
| 2014 | State of Affairs | Earl Givens |
