= Kate Is Enough =

- Awake episode
- Michael sees Kate is both realities. In one, she is a successful businesswoman, and in the other, where she is a junkie.
- Episode no.: Season 1 Episode 4
- Directed by: Sarah Pia Anderson
- Written by: Kyle Killen
- Production code: 1ATR08
- Original air date: March 22, 2012
- Running time: 43 minutes

Guest appearances
- Logan Miller as Cole; Chris McGarry as Dr. Banks; Brianna Brown as Kate Porter; Eric Lange as Darin Knox; Eddie Matos as Cameron Fuller; Geoff Meed as Mark Hudson; John Christopher Storey as Len; Michael Bryan French as Officer Bryce; Tony Colitti as Cameron's Lawyer; Angela Elayne Gibbs as Dora; Grinnell Morris as Darin's Lawyer

Episode chronology
← Previous "Guilty"	Next → "Oregon"

"Kate Is Enough" is the fourth episode of the American police procedural drama television series Awake. The episode first premiered on March 22, 2012, in the United States on NBC, was simultaneously broadcast on Global in Canada, and was subsequently aired on Sky Atlantic in the United Kingdom on May 25, 2012. It was written and produced by series creator and executive producer Kyle Killen, and was directed by Sarah Pia Anderson. "Kate Is Enough" was well received by television critics, who praised its storylines. Commentators noted that the script was well written and that the episode was "enjoyable". Upon airing, the episode garnered 4.73 million viewers in the United States and a 1.2 rating in the 18–49 demographic, according to Nielsen ratings. It ranked second in its timeslot of the night, behind The Mentalist on CBS.

The show centers on Michael Britten (Jason Isaacs), a police detective living in two separate realities after a car accident. In this episode, Michael deals with a case where a girl is found after on a hotel top in which she was pushed or jumped from. He sees Kate Porter (Brianna Brown) in both realities, after her sister died. In one life, Kate is a successful investment banker, while in the other she is a cocaine addict. Meanwhile, Rex's (Dylan Minnette) racket is broken by his best friend Cole (Logan Miller), which was an accident. Rex is angry because it belonged to his mother, Hannah (Laura Allen).

== Plot ==
The episode opens with Rex (Dylan Minnette) and his best friend Cole (Logan Miller) fighting over a tennis racquet, which Cole broke, which was Hannah's before the car accident. Rex's tennis coach Tara (Michaela McManus) tries to stop the fight, but Rex had accidentally hit her in the face. Michael (Jason Isaacs), Rex's father, is called to the school, when Rex tells Michael and Tara that he quit. He is very emotional due to Hannah's (Laura Allen) death, according to Dr. Judith Evans (Cherry Jones). Later in the "red reality", Efrem Vega (Wilmer Valderrama), Michael's partner in the reality, and Michael are called on a new case at a hotel room, where a woman falls into a lake from the hotel. They speak to Cameron Fuller (Eddie Matos) and Darin Knox (Eric Lange) about the case. Fuller and Knox noted that they Fuller dumped the lady, and she was "making a fool of herself", because she was so drunk. Fuller thought that he "shouldn't have left her alone". Soon after, as they walking away, Michael sees Rex's former babysitter Kate Porter (Brianna Brown). Michael doesn't introduce Vega to her. Later in his "green reality", Bird (Steve Harris), Michael's partner in this reality, works on a case where a man named Charlie Simmons, who is known to party and take drugs, was murdered. They speak to Dora (Angela Elayne Gibbs) about the case, she leads them to Kate Porter's house in the "green reality". Rather than a successful investment banker, she is a drug addict. She gets some papers and inhales cocaine up her nose in front of the detectives.

Dr. Jonathan Lee (BD Wong) noted that the "red reality" is real because she shows up in that world first, and in the other the next day. Dr. Evans helps Michael with the case in the "green reality", while Lee insisted that the picture Evans noted is fake. Michael and Hannah speak about Kate in the "red reality", when he finds out that her sister had died earlier. Michael thinks that she must be on the cocaine because of that. He shows Rex what they use to do together, Rex is depressed and mad, while Rex walks off claiming that he is studying for a Spanish test at school. Later, they go to a man's house who has a video camera at his house. This helps Michael with the case in the "green reality". Vega and Michael continue on the case, and Michael goes to the house. Vega says nothing is there, while Michael thinks to his "green reality", and looks in the bathroom for evidence, which was shaving cream in the cabinet. They speak to Cameron Fuller and Darin Knox, who committed the crime. Evidence was that a drink was dropped on the person who had fallen in the lake. Soon after, Dr. Wild finds evidence from the camera that Kate and her friend had done the crime. She finally confesses to it. They speak in both realities about the story of how it came to the current life. Michael speaks to Rex, again. Rex claimed that he was mad because the racquet was Hannah's, and that it helped him deal with her death in the "green reality". Rex goes to the tennis court and apologized to Cole who forgives him.

== Production ==
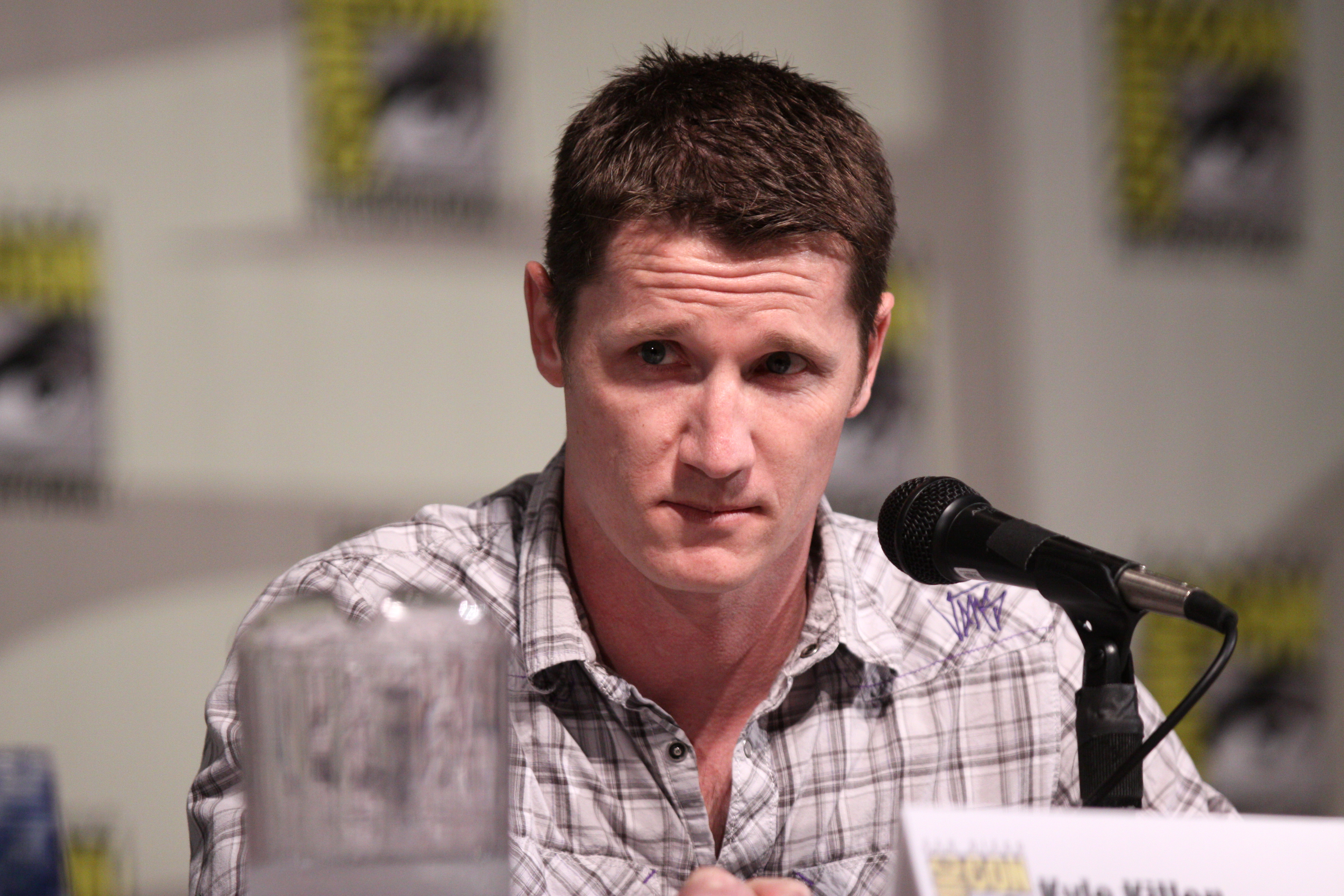
Series creator and executive producer Kyle Killen (pictured) wrote and produced the episode.

The episode was written and produced by series creator and executive producer Kyle Killen, and was directed by Sarah Pia Anderson; it was Killen's third writing credit, after previously writing "The Little Guy", the second episode aired on March 8, 2012. It was Anderson's first directing credit on the series. This is the only episode that aired out of production order, with the production code being "1ATR08", but aired fourth due to NBC's decision to change the broadcasting order.

It was teasingly suggested that Isaacs prove his devotion to Kermode and Mayo's Film Review by having his character say "ukulele" onscreen, which was a case of "Challenge accepted!" The line, "He's not going to be playing the ukulele in heaven", was uttered, while examining a corpse whose fingers had been badly mangled. "When I did that I got a note from the editing room going, 'What the f— are you talking about?'" says the actor. "I said, 'You have to keep the line in. If I can ever wield my big stick as a producer, I'm telling you I want the ukulele line left in!'" The line was kept in the episode.

=== Casting ===
The episode guest performances from Logan Miller, who was cast as Cole, Rex's best friend. Chris McGarry as Dr. Banks. Brianna Brown, as Kate Porter, who was Rex's former babysitter, Eric Lange, who played as Darin Knox, Eddie Matos as Cameron Fuller. Geoff Meed as Mark Hudson. John Christopher Storey, appeared as Len. Michael Bryan French, who played as Officer Bryce. Tony Colitti, who was cast as Cameron's Lawyer. J.L. Forbis, played Charlie. Angela Elayne Gibbs, who was cast as Dora. Grinnell Morris appeared as Darin's Lawyer.

== Reception ==
=== Ratings ===
"Kate Is Enough" was originally broadcast on March 22, 2012, in the United States on NBC between 10:00 p.m. and 11:00 p.m., preceded by Up All Night. Upon airing, the episode garnered 4.73 million viewers in the United States, and ranking second in its timeslot despite airing simultaneously with The Mentalist on CBS, and a rerun of Private Practice on ABC. It acquired a 1.2 rating in the 18–49 demographic, meaning that it was seen by 1.2% of all 18- to 49-year-olds, according to Nielsen ratings. The episode's ratings had dropped from the previous episode, "Guilty". It was simultaneously broadcast on Global in Canada, and was subsequently aired on Sky Atlantic in the United Kingdom on May 25, 2012. It obtained 244,000 viewers, making it the third most-watched program for that week on the channel behind Game of Thrones and Hit & Miss.

=== Critical response ===
"Kate Is Enough" was well received by television commentators, who praised its storylines. Matt Fowler of IGN gave the episode a complimentary review. He thought that the episode "hit us with its most 'proceduraly'-feeling episode so far". Fowler claimed that "it is very self-contained". Despite this, he wrote that the "murder case wasn't all that interesting", and called the episode predictable. Fowler concluded his review by giving the episode an "8 out of 10" score, classifying it as "great". Zack Handlen of The A.V. Club enjoyed the episode. In his "A−" review, he noted that it is "difficult it is to be a parent" on the series. Handlen wrote that "Awake benefits from not poking its premise too hard", and "this single-mindedness stems directly from the show's leading man". Nick McHatton from TV Fanatic mainly enjoyed this episode. McHatton claimed that "It's hard not to wonder if Kate's story, and her pushing of her sister to go through with their little surfing outing that turned deadly, is some foreshadowing of how Britten's accident. He concluded his review by giving the episode a "4.8 out of 5". Caroline Preece from Den of Geek claimed that "It's more fun to block this out and theorise for yourself". She called it "enjoyable" and there were "frustrations" for the episode. HitFix's Alan Sepinwall complained that "the show telegraphed the importance of the broken racket way too much". Screenrant's Kevin Yeoman called the episode "solid". Matthew Delman of Science Fiction thought that the episode was "rather good offering".
