= Oregon (Awake) =

- Awake episode
- Episode no.: Season 1 Episode 5
- Directed by: Aaron Lipstadt
- Written by: Lisa Zwerling
- Production code: 1ATR03
- Original air date: March 29, 2012
- Running time: 43 minutes

Guest appearances
- Laura Innes as Tricia Harper; Chris McGarry as Dr. Banks; Salvator Xuereb as Gemini; Megan Dodds as Elizabeth Santoro; Frank Gallegos as DaSalva; Hal Havins as Hotel Manager; Brett London as Driver #1; Landon Ashworth as Driver #2; Ronnie Clark as Crazy Man; Marlene Gilroy as Bronzed Older Woman; Erin Woods as Santoro's Daughter; Damian Poitier as Uniform

Episode chronology
← Previous "Kate Is Enough"	Next → "That's Not My Penguin"

"Oregon" is the fifth episode of the American police procedural drama television series Awake. The episode first premiered on March 29, 2012 in the United States on NBC, was simultaneously broadcast on Global in Canada, and was subsequently aired on Sky Atlantic in the United Kingdom on June 1, 2012. It was written by consulting producer Lisa Zwerling, and directed by Aaron Lipstadt. "Oregon" was well received by television critics, who praised its storylines. Commentators noted that the script was well written and that the episode was the "strongest outing" since "Pilot" broadcast on March 1, 2012. Upon airing, the episode garnered 3.18 million viewers in the United States and a 1.0/3 rating-share in the 18–49 demographic, according to Nielsen ratings. It ranked second in its timeslot, behind The Mentalist on CBS.

The show centers on Michael Britten (Jason Isaacs), a police detective living in two separate realities after a car accident. In this episode, Michael deals with a case involving a serial killer Gemini, who had killed another person in the "green reality". FBI agent Elizabeth Santoro (Megan Dodds) insists that he is dead, as she killed him herself after he had committed a huge crime. Gemini pretends to be a police officer, and frames Michael, pretending that he was with him. Agent Santoro thinks that he is involved in the case due to this frame, and other reasons. Gemini injects Santoro, and then takes her to a place outside. He starts to cut Santoro's wrist off, and Michael and his partner in the "green reality", Isaiah "Bird" Freeman (Steve Harris) get her. Meanwhile, in the "red reality", Dr. Jonathan Lee (BD Wong) states that Michael and his wife Hannah Britten (Laura Allen)'s marriage is falling apart. However, Hannah admits that she was "embarrassed" about wanting to move to Oregon.

== Plot ==
The episode opens in the "red reality" (where Hannah is alive and Rex is not from the car accident), and Michael Britten (Jason Isaacs) is jogging around Los Angeles. When Michael gets home, he talks to his wife Hannah (Laura Allen), who is in Oregon looking at a university. Later in the "green reality" (where Rex is alive and Hannah is not), Michael and Rex (Dylan Minnette) are stuck in traffic, and Michael is later called into work. His partner in the "green reality", Isaiah "Bird" Freeman (Steve Harris) talks to Michael, then Michael goes for a run at the Griffith Park. He goes to the top of a hill overlooking the city, while a dog appears from behind a bush and barks at him. Michael notices human flesh in him, and goes to investigate, where he finds a corpse sitting against a tree. Michael goes to the police station, and shows Captain Harper similar cases starting in 1999. In each case, a killer, nicknamed Gemini (Salvator Xuereb), vertically slashed the victim's wrists and carved a Roman numeral in their chests. The murders have taken place all across the United States, but everyone believes that Gemini is dead after an FBI agent Elizabeth Santoro (Megan Dodds) had shot him. Michael wants to cover the area as much as they can and Captain Tricia Harper (Laura Innes) agrees, telling Michael to pick up the profiler that the FBI has sent. Michael goes to Brentwood and meets with FBI agent Elizabeth Santoro. They discuss his history and she admits that she has been focused solely on the "Gemini Killer" for the last 12 years. Michael confirms that they did not find one on the body, so she figures that it is a copycat. Michael goes to the crime scene, while Bird is already there. The partners go over the hillside and find the dog. They take him to Dr. Banks (Chris McGarry) and have him check his stomach, where he finds a United States two-dollar bill in it. When Michael takes the evidence to Harper and Santoro, Santoro insists that it only means that someone with classified information to the case is involved. She suggests they check anyone who has recently laid off law enforcement officers with psych problems. Bird and Santoro create a database if the killer is alive. Santoro lets Harper decide and she tells the detectives to pull the files on law officers. As Santoro leaves, Michael approaches her and says that he understands the implications if the man she shot was Gemini. Meanwhile, the killer prepares a set of medical tools, a wad of two-dollar bills, and a syringe.

Later in the "green reality", Michael suggests they check cheap motels in the area, since Gemini set up base a couple miles from the sites of his murders. Later, Michael talks to the manager at one hotel. After he leaves the hotel, Michael sees a secret place closed and Michael breaks in, drawing his gun. He spots the "Gemini Killer" inside, but he ran away when Michael identified himself as a police officer. Soon after, the CSI team investigates, and Harper and Santoro wonder why Michael was there. He says that he was checking out motels and thought the building looked suspicious, and Santoro claimed that Michael is a "suspect". They are unaware that the killer is listening to them from a nearby vent. Michael leaves the investigation, and as he goes to his car, the killer is seen dressed in a police uniform, as he is starting at him. Later at the station, Harper tells him that they got a call from someone claiming to be their guy. She plays a recording and Gemini addresses Michael as his friend. Harper tells Michael that they traced the call to his home phone. Later, Michael meets with Bird and the two find out that the killer was going to eject and then murder Agent Santoro. Later, the "Gemini Killer" begins to cut the FBI agent's wrist. Minutes later, Michael and Bird try to find the killer, and the agent. They find her and she is taken to the hospital. Her family comes and sees her. Later, Michael tells Hannah what he's learned about the movers and Oregon. She shares her secrets, claimed that she was "embarrassed", and they talk.

Michael's shrink in the "green reality", Dr. Judith Evans (Cherry Jones), cites that one reality will begin the scene as a fantasy. As Michael leaves in the car, Gemini calls Michael and explains that he was intrigued by Michael's success in tracking him down. He broke into Evans' office, read her files, and asks Michael if he is awake or asleep. However, Gemini says that the world needs people like him and Michael; people who can see it sideways. As he takes a flight to Portland, Gemini says that he hopes Michael doesn't wake up and then hangs up.

== Production ==
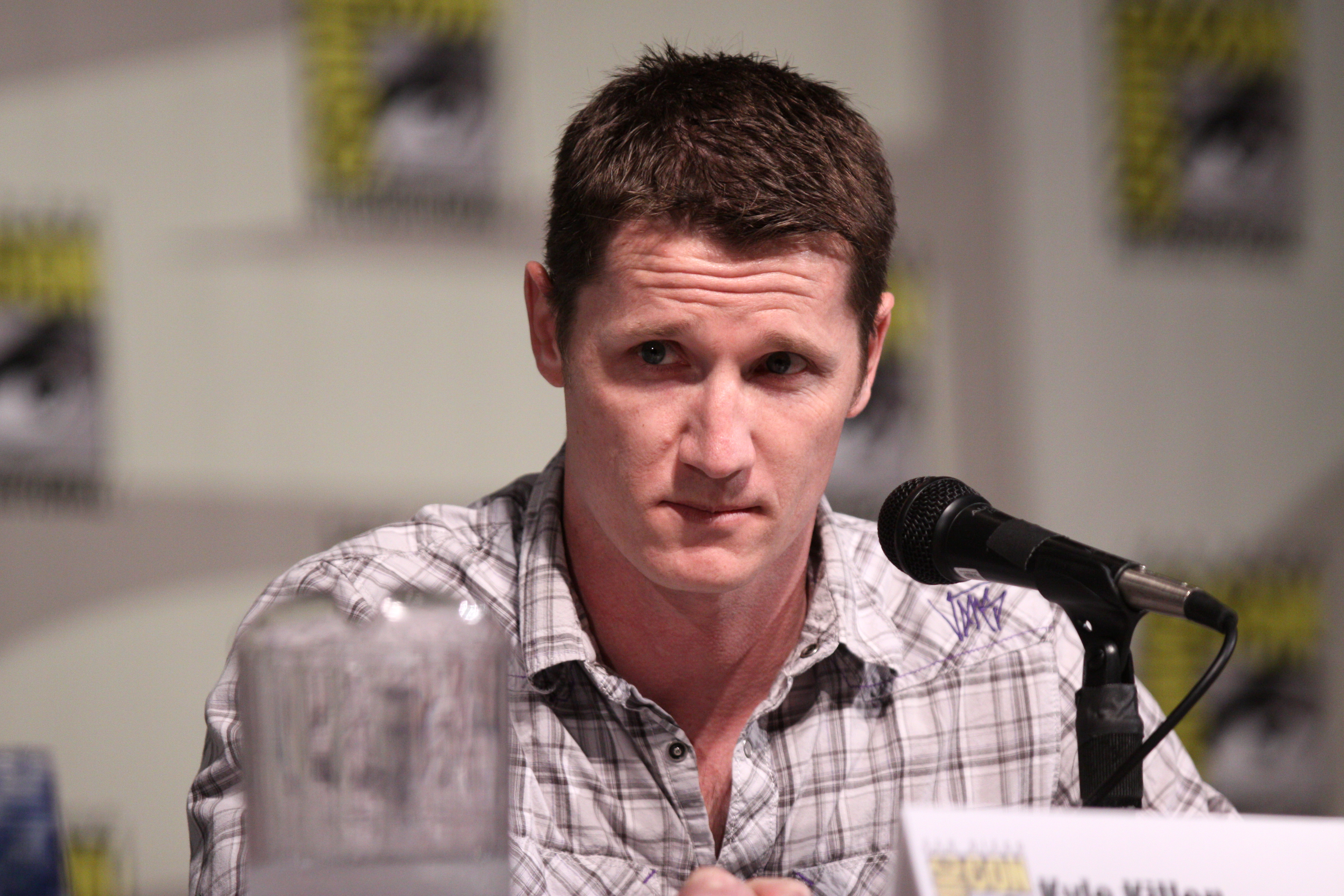
This is the second episode that was not written by series creator and executive producer Kyle Killen.

The episode was written by consulting producer Lisa Zwerling, and directed by Aaron Lipstadt; it was Zwerling and Lipstadt's first writing credit, and was Lipstadt's first directing credit on the series. This is the second episode that was not written by series creator and executive producer Kyle Killen, with the last episode he wrote being "Guilty". Although it was the fifth broadcast episode, it was originally scheduled to be the fourth episode of the season, with the production code being "1ATR03" due to NBC's decision to change the broadcasting order.

=== Casting ===
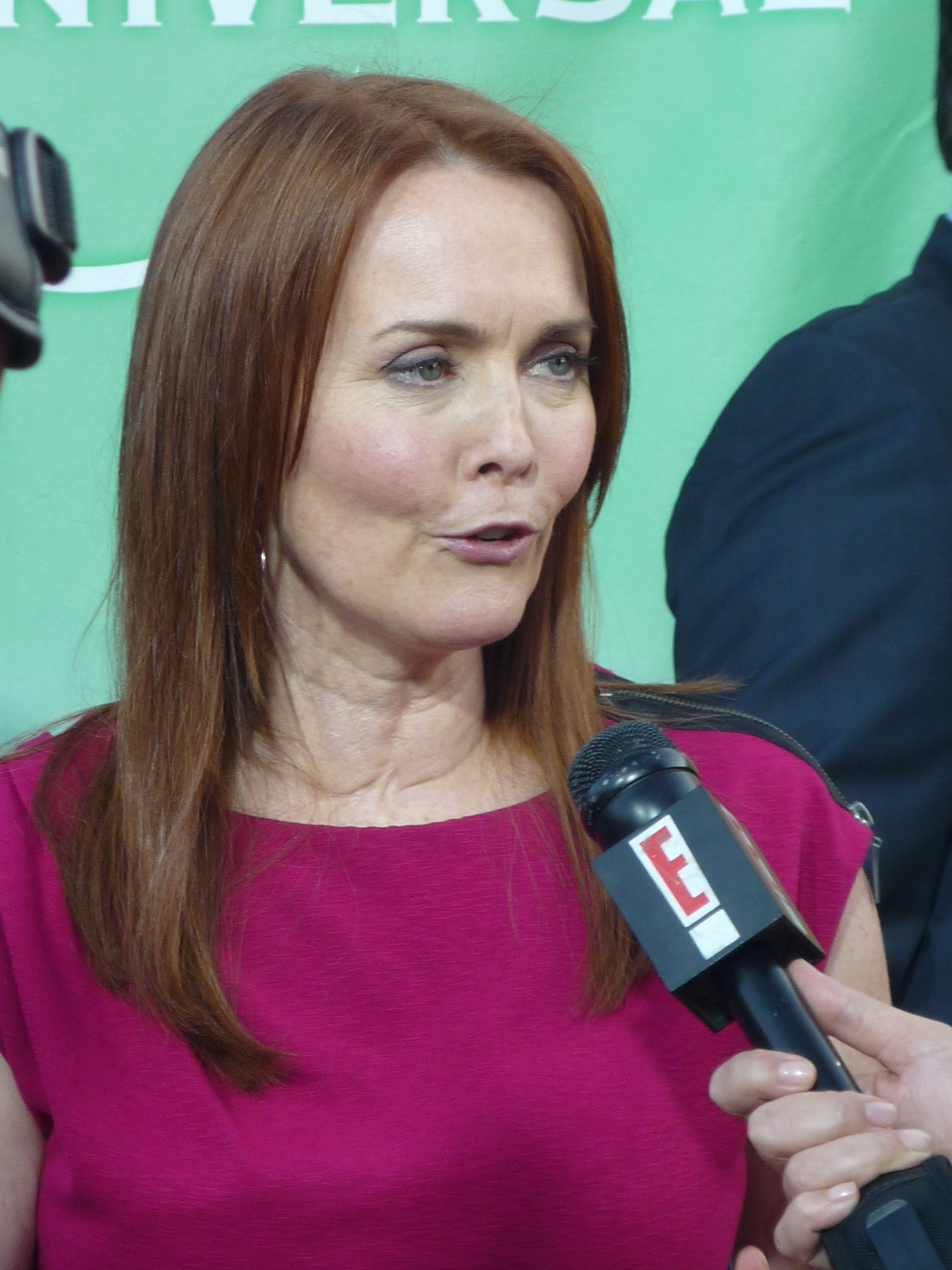
Laura Innes appeared as Tricia Harper, Michael's commanding officer in the series.

The episode featured guest performances from many actors including Laura Innes as Tricia Harper, Michael's captain officer in the series, Chris McGarry as Dr. Banks, a doctor working at the Los Angeles Police Department, Salvator Xuereb as Gemini, and Megan Dodds as Elizabeth Santoro, an FBI agent. Frank Gallegos was cast as DaSalva, Hal Havins was cast as hotel manager Brett London, and Erin Woods was cast as Santoro's daughter. Damian Poitier also appeared, but as a police uniform officer.

== Reception ==
=== Ratings ===
"Oregon" was originally broadcast on March 29, 2012 in the United States on NBC between 10:00 p.m. and 11:00 p.m., preceded by Up All Night. Upon airing, the episode garnered 3.18 million viewers in the United States, and ranked second in its timeslot despite airing simultaneously with The Mentalist on CBS, and a rerun of Private Practice on ABC. It acquired a 1.0/3 rating-share in the 18–49 demographic, meaning that it was seen by 1.0% of all 18- to 49-year-olds, according to Nielsen ratings. The episode's ratings had dropped from the previous episode, "Kate Is Enough", which obtained one million less in viewers. It was simultaneously broadcast on Global in Canada, and was subsequently aired on Sky Atlantic in the United Kingdom on June 1, 2012. The episode obtained 228,000 million viewers in the United Kingdom, making it the fourth most-watched program for that week on the channel behind Smash, Hit & Miss, and Game of Thrones. The episode's ratings had slightly dropped from the previous episode.

=== Critical response ===
"Oregon" was well received by most television commentators, who praised its storylines. Matt Fowler of IGN gave the episode a good review. He claimed that the episode "felt like a bit of a stand-alone story focusing on Britten's heightened anxiety over Rex's grief", and that the episode also "stepped in and launched the series forward, introducing one of Britten's worlds to a rather apropos serial killer". He also liked the episode's "ambition". Fowler concluded his review by giving the episode an "8.5 out of 10", classifying it as "great". Nick McHatton from TV Fanatic also praised the episode. He claimed that the Britten family will not move to Oregon in the "red reality", as it is "already complex enough as it is". McHatton concluded his review by giving the episode a score of "4.8 out of 5". Caroline Preece from Den of Geek gave praise in the episode. She claimed that the episode was the "strongest outing" since "Pilot" broadcast on March 1, 2012. Preece wrote that the episode "used interesting story ideas, [meaning] the writers have bigger plans for the weeks ahead". HitFix's Alan Sepinwall gave many notes on the episode. He claimed that NBC's decision to change the broadcasting order was "probably for the best, in that doing back-to-back episodes where Britten's son was kidnapped in the first and Britten attracted the personal interest of a serial killer in the second would have felt like too much". He criticized parts of the episode writing that the episode "seemed too much like a conventional cop show". Screen Rant's Kevin Yeoman said that the episode "works best when its procedural elements take on a sort of background essence". He also wrote that as a series it is "becoming a sustainable program". Zack Handlen from The A.V. Club enjoyed "Oregon". In his "B" review, he stated that he enjoyed the "impressionistic approach, scenes of emotional connection and growth".
