= Guilty (Awake) =

- Awake episode
- Episode no.: Season 1 Episode 3
- Directed by: Jeffrey Reiner
- Written by: Howard Gordon; Evan Katz
- Production code: 1ATR02
- Original air date: March 15, 2012
- Running time: 42 minutes

Guest appearances
- Logan Miller as Cole; Daniela Bobadilla as Emma; Bailey Chase as David Walker; William Russ as Jim Mayhew; Clifton Powell as John Cooper; Jim Cantafio as IA Officer; Lolly Ward as Nancy; David Pease as Doubting Cop; Enrique Almeida as Perez; Kevin Jackson as Homeless Man; Christopher Judd as Paramedic

Episode chronology
← Previous "The Little Guy"	Next → "Kate Is Enough"

"Guilty" is the third episode of the American police procedural drama television series Awake. The episode first aired on March 15, 2012 in the United States on NBC, and was simultaneously broadcast on Global in Canada. It was written by series executive producer and showrunner Howard Gordon and consulting producer Evan Katz, and was directed by Jeffrey Reiner. "Guilty" was well received by television critics, who praised its storylines, noting the script to be interesting. The episode garnered 5.12 million viewers in the United States and a 1.6/4 rating in the 18–49 demographic, according to Nielsen ratings. It ranked second in its timeslot of the night, behind Private Practice on ABC.

The show centers on Michael Britten (Jason Isaacs), a police detective living in two separate realities after a car accident. In this episode, John Cooper (Clifton Powell), a convict that Michael arrested 10 years ago, escapes from jail. Tara (Michaela McManus) and Rex (Dylan Minnette) go to tennis practice. Cooper hits the car Rex is in, incapacitates Tara, and kidnaps Rex. John kidnaps him for "justice", claiming that he was innocent. Michael later finds out in the "red reality", that Jim Mayhew (William Russ) had framed him for murder. He wears a wire to set him up, and obtains a confession. Meanwhile, Hannah's (Laura Allen) friends organize a service for Rex's death in the "red reality". Michael can't come because of the "green reality".

== Plot ==
The episode opens in the "green reality" (where Rex is alive and Hannah isn't), with John Cooper (Clifton Powell), a convict that Michael arrested 10 years ago, who is transferred to a medical clinic for dialysis because he is missing a kidney, by Nancy (Lolly Ward). As the guard takes Cooper to the car to go back to prison, he complains that the prisoner is getting preferential treatment over his mother, who is on the waiting list. As they arrive at the van, Cooper uses a paralytic vial hidden in his bandages to knock one guard out. He takes his gun, and makes the other security guard shut the door. Cooper claims his has "nothing to lose". Later, at home, while Rex's tennis coach Tara (Michaela McManus) takes him to tennis practice, Michael gets a call from Isaiah "Bird" Freeman (Steve Harris), his partner, that Cooper had escaped. Rex and Tara are talking about Rex's guilt about his father, when Cooper hits the car, and puts a chemical thing on Tara, and kidnaps Rex.

Michael and Bird investigate in the case, and Michael, with evidence, finds out where Rex is, and runs away. Meanwhile, Rex wakes up inside of a shed, handcuffed to the floor. He tries to dial 9-1-1 on the cell phone but Cooper comes in, interrupting him. Michael speaks to Nancy, who admits that she helped Cooper escape but didn’t know he would abduct anyone. She claims that she helped him because he claimed that he was innocent. Tara notes that Cooper had phoned Tara, and told him to go to a payphone near his police station. He goes there, and speaks to Cooper, who tells him to meet him at a warehouse. Cooper then apologizes to Rex, stating that "no son should pay for the sins of the fathers", and walks out of the shack. Michael meets with him; he claims that he met him for "justice", and said that he was innocent. Cooper explains that Rex will die without him, confirming that he will die from dehydration possibly soon. He goes home and takes a sleeping pill, transferring to the "red reality". Later, in the "red reality" (where Hannah is alive and Rex isn't), he speaks with Cooper at jail. He says that he didn't do it, and asks if he knows who did. He claimed that Jim Mayhew, another cop, committed the crime and framed him.

Michael leaves the prison and calls Mayhew, and offers to come over for a beer. However, once Michael comes over, he reminds Mayhew that Bell had a million dollars but only $100,000 ever turned up. He figures that Mayhew killed Bell, took the money, and planted the gun in Cooper's house. When Michael demands his share of the stolen money, he kept stating that there was no money. However, as Michael leaves, Mayhew says that he has the remaining money for him. Michael leaves, Mayhew goes to the door, and finds out that the police are there. They arrest him. Michael's partner in the "red reality", Efrem Vega (Wilmer Valderrama) admits to Michael that he wasn't sure if his partner had dreamed up the entire thing. Later in the "green reality", Michael and the team head to the shed to get Rex, and take him to the hospital. In the shed, Rex had left a video message, which Michael had watched. Rex had said that he loved him. Michael wakes up in the "red reality", and speaks to Hannah about their experiences.

== Production ==
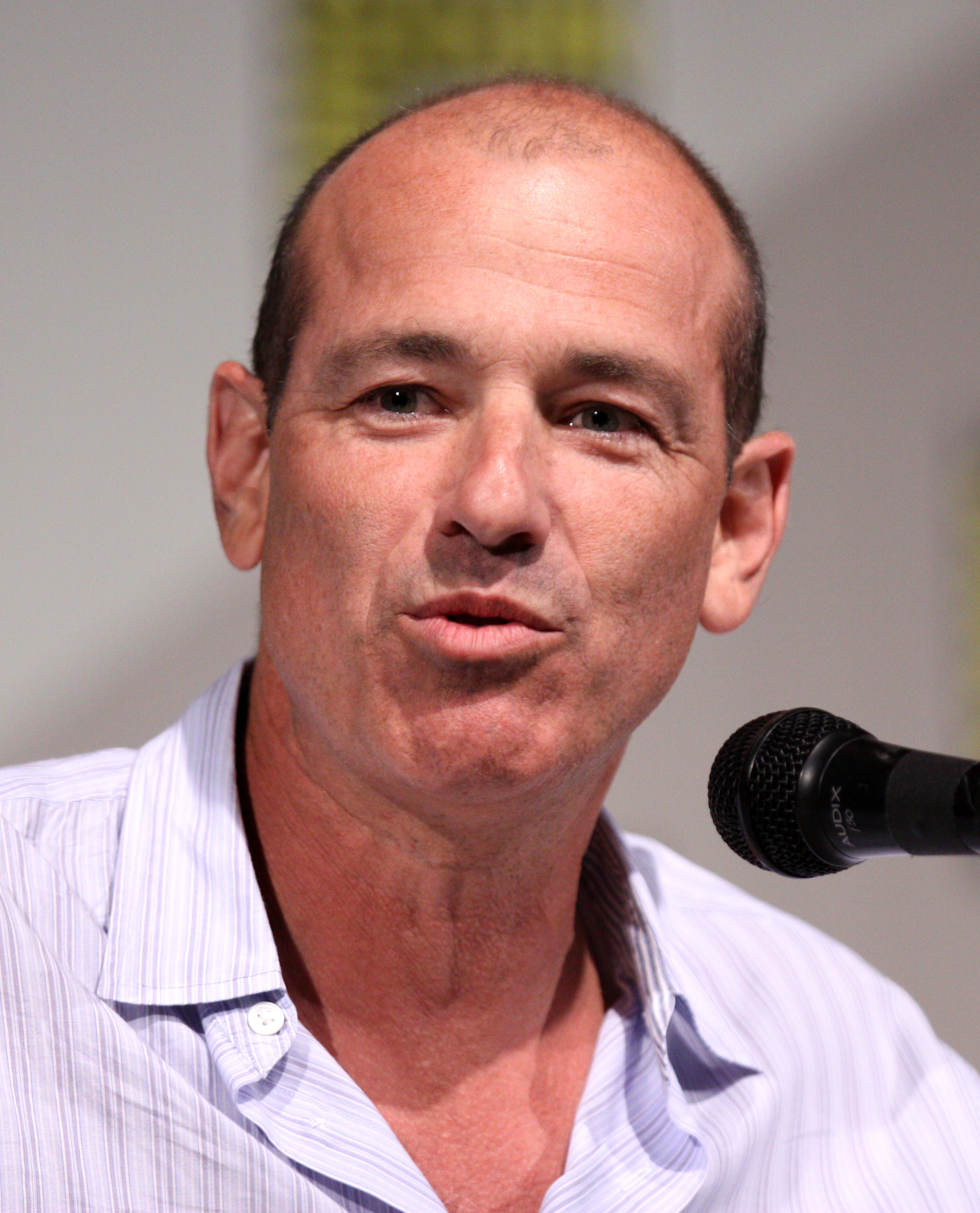
Howard Gordon (pictured) wrote the episode, alongside consulting producer Evan Katz.

The episode was written by series executive producer and showrunner Howard Gordon and consulting producer Evan Katz, and was directed by Jeffrey Reiner. It marked both Gordon and Katz's first writing credit in the series, and director Reiner's second directing credit, with the last episode he directed being "The Little Guy", the second episode aired on March 8, 2012. This is the first episode that was not written by series creator and executive producer Kyle Killen.

=== Casting ===
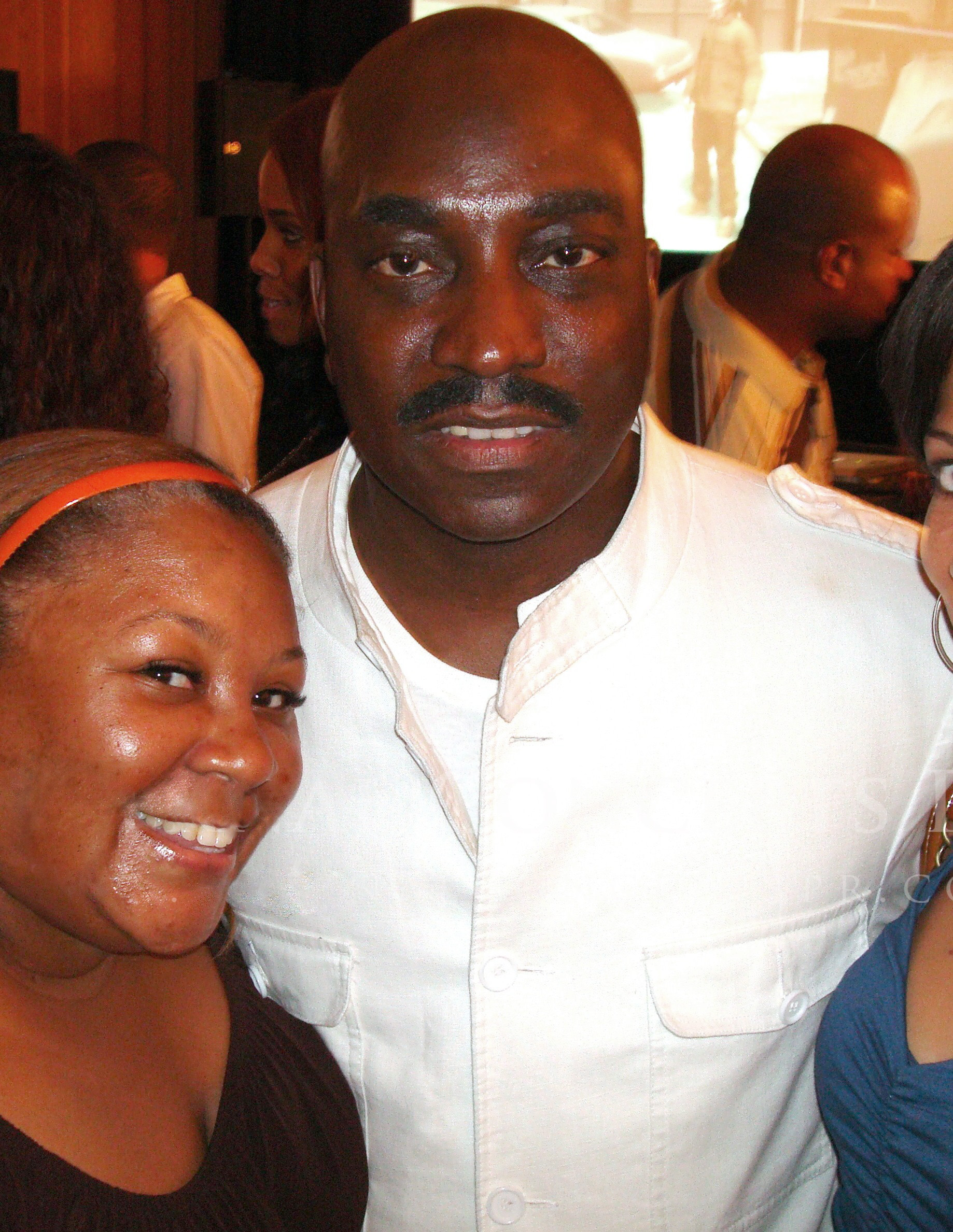
Clifton Powell (pictured) guest starred as John Cooper.

The episode featured guest performances from many actors including: Logan Miller, who was cast as Cole, Rex's best friend. Daniela Bobadilla appeared as Emma, who is Rex's girlfriend, currently. Bailey Chase, who played as David Walker. Clifton Powell as John Cooper, a man who was falsely accused of a crime ten years earlier. He was framed by Jim Mayhew, played by William Russ. Jim Cantafio appeared as an IA Officer. Lolly Ward as Nancy, a man who had helped Cooper escape from jail. David Pease as Doubting Cop. Enrique Almeida, who was cast as Perez. Kevin Jackson, who appeared as a Homeless Man, and Christopher Judd, who was cast as the Paramedic.

== Reception ==
=== Ratings ===
"Guilty" was originally broadcast on March 15, 2012 in the United States on NBC between 10:00 pm and 11:00 pm, preceded by Up All Night. The episode garnered 5.12 million viewers in its original airing the United States, and it ranked second in its timeslot despite airing simultaneously with Private Practice on ABC, and a live airing of the college basketball game, with teams New Mexico and Indiana playing. It acquired a 1.6/4 rating-share in the 18–49 demographic, meaning that it was seen by 1.6% of all 18- to 49-year-olds, according to Nielsen ratings. The episode's ratings had slightly improved over the previous episode, "The Little Guy", which obtained 4 million viewers. It was simultaneously broadcast on Global in Canada, and was subsequently aired on Sky Atlantic in the United Kingdom on May 18, 2012. The episode obtained 277,000 million viewers in the United Kingdom on its original airing, making it the third most-watched program for that week on the channel behind Game of Thrones and Blue Bloods. Its ratings had slightly dropped from the previous episode.

=== Critical response ===
"Guilty" was well received by most television commentators, who praised its storylines. Matt Fowler of IGN gave the episode a complimentary review. He claimed that the episode "effectively ramped up the tension". Fowler thought that it "might have been a bit too much to accept that poor Rex had to suffer through yet another near-death ordeal", and that "the episode itself was able to provide genuine thrills mixed with some incredible moments of tenderness". Fowler noted that Michael fully took "advantage of his unique, tragic, situation by having him purposefully use one world as a source of information to help him solve a case". Stating that the episode had "top-tier entertainment", Fowler concluded his review by giving the episode a "9 out of 10", classifying it as "great". Nick McHatton from TV Fanatic mainly enjoyed this episode. McHatton claimed that Rex's current behaviour and thoughts are "understandable" and "heart-renching". He concluded his review by giving the episode a "4.7 out of 5" score. Caroline Preece from Den of Geek gave praise in the episode. He thought the episode was "built around a gripping premise". Preece wrote that the series is "still very odd" after the episode. HitFix's Alan Sepinwall noted many parts of the episode. Sepinwall stated that there was a "notable change in feel or style" from other episodes, because of different writers for the episode. He noted that "the idea of the loved one getting kidnapped feels like a very big card to play this early", and that "it does fit in with the theme of the show". Zack Handlen of The A.V. Club gave less praise and enjoyment in the episode. In his "B−" review, he noted that the "premise has been established". He stated that it is "a clever device". He argued that the "plotting isn't helping" the episode. The Voice of TV's Mary Powers gave the episode an "A−" grade. She called the episode "fabulous". Carl Cortez from Assignment X gave much praise in the episode. He called it a "twisty/turny adventure". Cortez claimed that it "feels too early and convenient" for Rex to get kidnapped.
