= Turtles All the Way Down (Awake) =

- Awake episode
- Episode no.: Season 1 Episode 13
- Directed by: Miguel Sapochnik
- Story by: Kyle Killen; Leonard Chang; Noelle Valdivia
- Teleplay by: Kyle Killen
- Production code: 1ATR12
- Original air dates: May 23, 2012 (Global); May 24, 2012 (NBC)
- Running time: 45 minutes

Guest appearances
- Laura Innes as Tricia Harper; Kevin Weisman as Ed Hawkins; Mark Harelik as Carl Kessel

Episode chronology
← Previous "Two Birds"	Next → —

"Turtles All the Way Down" is the thirteenth and final episode of the American television police procedural fantasy drama Awake. It premiered on May 23, 2012 in Canada on Global, and on May 24, 2012 in the United States on NBC. "Turtles All the Way Down" was scheduled to air on May 17, 2012, as part two of a two-hour finale. NBC had changed the order, and moved it to the following week. The teleplay of the episode was written by series creator Kyle Killen, from a story by Killen, and staff writers Leonard Chang and Noelle Valdivia. It was directed by Miguel Sapochnik. "Turtles All the Way Down" was well received by television critics, who praised its storylines. Commentators noted that the script was well written. Upon airing, "Turtles All the Way Down" obtained 2.87 million viewers in the United States and 0.9 million in the 18–49 demographic, according to Nielsen ratings.

The show centers on Michael Britten (Jason Isaacs) a police detective living in two separate realities after a car accident. In the episode, Michael Britten finds out the truth about the car accident that caused his split realities, and seeks out those responsible for it. He finds out that Captain Tricia Harper (Laura Innes) caused the accident, alongside Ed Hawkins (Kevin Weisman) and Captain Carl Kessel (Mark Harelik).

== Plot ==
In his "green reality" (where his son is alive and his wife is dead), Detective Michael Britten (Jason Isaacs) sits in a prison cell temporary for killing Detective Ed Hawkins (Kevin Weisman), who caused Michael's car accident. Meanwhile, his partner in the "green reality", Detective Isaiah "Bird" Freeman (Steve Harris) finds heroin that Hawkins, under orders from Captain Kessel (Mark Harelik), had placed in a self storage unit. Meanwhile, Captain Tricia Harper (Laura Innes) shoots Carl Kessel in a hotel room, making it look like a suicide to cover up her involvement in Michael's accident. Michael is freed from the cell and Kessel's body is found.

Michael regains consciousness (after having passed out from a gunshot wound when Ed Hawkins was chasing after him) near a dumpster in the "red reality" (where his wife is alive and son is dead). The still-alive Detective Hawkins takes Michael to his car, but Michael flees after attacking Hawkins and causes a car accident. Michael finds his therapist in the "red reality", Dr. John Lee (BD Wong), forces him to sew up the bullet wound, and takes him to the self-storage unit to show him the heroin stash. Seeing no heroin, Michael then locks Lee in the containment center and contacts his partner in the "red reality", detective Efrem Vega (Wilmer Valderrama). Vega secretly takes Britten to his house but, upon returning to the police station, is convinced that Michael is unstable and allows Michael to be captured. Michael is first taken to the hospital to receive medical treatment and then goes to jail.

Harper visits Michael in jail. When Michael notices the caller ID of an incoming call matching Kessel's hotel room pseudonym, he realizes Harper is part of the conspiracy and attempts to strangle her. Later, Michael is visited by himself from the "green reality" who leads him to the jail door. Past the door, Michael first witnesses Kessel's murder and Detective Vega, in a penguin suit, shows Harper's heel breaking in the process hinting that this can be used as hard evidence to place Harper at Kessel's murder. Next Michael briefly meets his wife, Hannah (Laura Allen) in a restaurant before he finds his "green reality" self sleeping in his bedroom. He – his "red reality" self – lies down in bed as well and merges with his "green reality" self before waking up in said "green reality".

In Harper's office, Michael confronts her about her involvement in his accident, pulling out his gun to shoot her. However, he instead lets Bird and another detective arrest her. Later, Dr. Evans applauds Michael's apparent rejection of the "red reality" and, when Michael suggests his fantastic experiences may have simply been a dream of the "red reality," Dr. Evans warns him not to create a third reality. She suddenly goes still. Michael, confused, goes through her office door and finds himself in his bedroom. He goes downstairs and finds both his son, Rex (Dylan Minnette), and wife alive. Concerned about Michael's odd behavior, Hannah asks if he is okay. He replies, "I'm perfect," and closes his eyes.

== Production ==
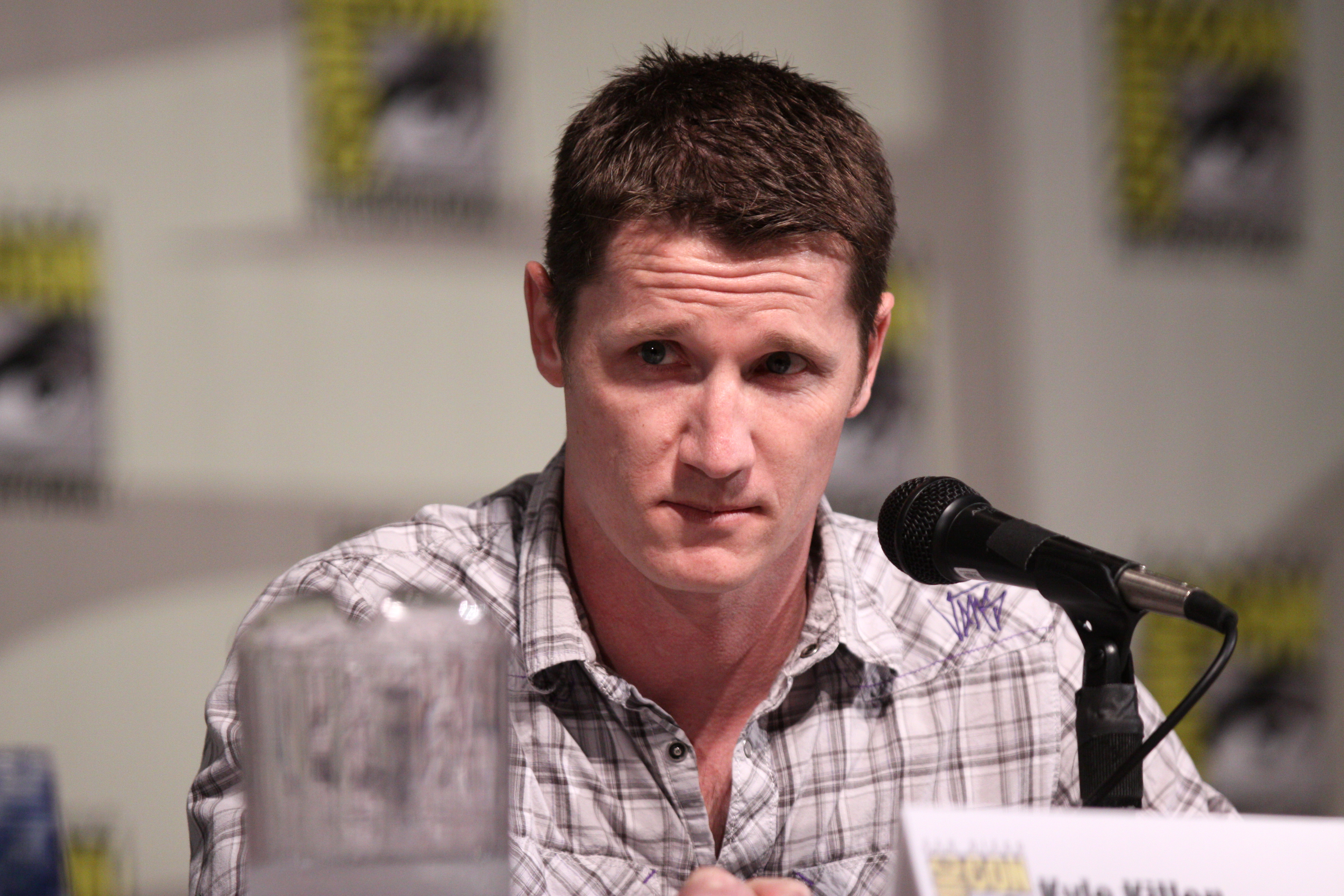
Series creator and executive producer Kyle Killen (pictured) wrote the story and teleplay of the episode, alongside staff writers Leonard Chang and Noelle Valdivia.

The episode's teleplay was written by series creator and executive producer Kyle Killen, from a story by Killen, and staff writers Leonard Chang and Noelle Valdivia; it was Killen's seventh writing credit, and Chang and Valdivia's third writing credit each. It was directed by Miguel Sapochnik, his first directing credit for the series.

In January 2012, it was announced that Kevin Weisman would appear in multiple episodes of Awake. The actor was later cast as Ed Hawkins, a cop who took over Michael's spot at the police department after his crash. This is his third appearance on the series, with the first being "Say Hello to My Little Friend", the eleven episode. Other guest stars included Laura Innes as Tricia Harper and Mark Harelik as Carl Kessel.

The episode featured the song "Montana" by Youth Lagoon during the final scene. Many viewers wondered if the series creator had changed the ending for the last episode, due to the cancellation of the series. This caused series creator and executive producer Killen to assure viewers that the episode would have been "exactly the same" if it had been renewed for a second season. In a pre-broadcast interview by Entertainment Weekly with Killen and actor Jason Isaacs, Isaacs claimed that he found it "strangely ironic and amusing" to be promoting the series finale of the Awake series. Killen claimed that "When we wrote the episode, we didn't know it would be the end of the series". He stated that it had a "satisfying conclusion", "and I think it will be a satisfying way to leave the show".

"Turtles All the Way Down" was scheduled to air as part two of the scheduled two-hour finale. NBC had changed the order, and aired it the following week.

== Reception ==
=== Ratings ===
"Turtles All the Way Down" first premiered a day early in Canada on May 23, 2012 on Global between 10:00 p.m. and 11:00 p.m., due to the season premiere of the Canadian series Rookie Blue, which aired in Awake's regular time slot on Thursdays at 10:00 p.m. The episode premiered on May 24, 2012 in the United States on NBC between 10:00 p.m. and 11:00 p.m. Upon airing, "Turtles All the Way Down" obtained 2.87 million viewers in the United States despite airing simultaneously with a rerun of The Mentalist on CBS and Rookie Blue on ABC. It acquired a 0.9 rating in the 18–49 demographic, according to Nielsen ratings, meaning that it was seen by 0.9% of all 18- to 49-year-olds. The episode marked the series' highest ratings since the fifth episode "Oregon" which aired on March 29, 2012.

=== Critical response ===
"Turtles All the Way Down" was well received by television commentators. Zack Handlen of The A.V. Club gave the episode a positive review. He also noted that parts of the episode were "surprising", and that "the show embraced some final insanity before the end, it’s more the illusion of depth than actual depth". Handlen wrote that "it’s hard to ask for more from an hour of television", despite noting that he was "glad the series got cancelled". Handlen noted that he would "look forward to their next projects". Handlen concluded his review by giving the episode a grade of "B". Matt Fowler of IGN gave the episode a positive review and claimed that there were some "gut-wrenching" scenes in the episode. Fowler also opined that the episode was "thrilling", "frustrating", "fascinating", and "terrible" to see Hannah "crying over an arrested Britten". Fowler wrote that he "love[d] the open ending". Noting that Awake was "one of the good ones", Fowler concluded his review by giving the episode a "9.5 out of 10" classifying it as "amazing". Nick McHatton of TV Fanatic gave the episode a positive review. He opined that Michael "has a unique ability to dream in a way that feels real, why not recreate what was once lost". McHatton found it "fitting that the show ended with Michael closing his eyes. Despite the fact that he did not know what the phrase "turtles all the way down" meant, he concluded his review by giving the episode a score "5.0 out of 5.0".

Ross Bonaime of Paste magazine gave the episode a complimentary review. He started by claiming that Awake was "the best drama to come out the 2011–12 season on television, and one of the finest NBC dramas in years". He also wondered "what Awake would be like in a Michael Britten-like alternate reality where the show lasted five seasons, or 10, or even just one more year", Could Awake maintain this story for long and still be compelling?" Bonaime wrote that it was "better to have one great season and be remembered fondly". Bonaime claimed that the "ending is quite smart, given that it never truly clarifies if Michael was dreaming the whole time, or if Dr. Lee was right and that he was on the verge of completely snapping, which makes much more sense". He was also grateful that "Awake decided to just go completely nuts with the last half of this episode". He claimed that the episode and series was "different, a rare move, especially on network television". He claimed that "Once Awake arrives on Netflix and DVD, people will rush through in a matter of days and will say they enjoyed their experience with this short yet sweet treasure". He claimed that works with Awake should be "rewarded" and "praised". Bonaime concluded his review by giving the episode a "9.0 out of 10".

Screen Rant's Kevin Yeoman, gave much praise in the episode. Like Paste magazine and other critics reviews, Yeoman claimed that "there was certainly disappointment in finding out that Awake wouldn't see a second season, and would instead be looked at as a 13-episode miniseries". He claimed that the episode has the puzzling and high points that are similar to "That's Not My Penguin" and "Say Hello to My Little Friend". Again, Screen Crush's Kevin Fitzpatrick was also disappointed that there would not be a second season. Verne Gay of Newsday gave the episode a complimenting review. He called it "promising". He noted that he could see "why Awake was canceled". He blessed "the show for at least trying". He called it "challenging" and "original". Alan Sepinwall of HitFix called the episode "fascinating", "puzzling" and "moving". Carl Cortez of Assignment X, again, enjoyed the episode. In his "B+" grade review, he noted that "you can view it as another missed opportunity". He claimed that parts of the episode were "confusing". He stated that he would "prefer to have more questions than answers". He argued that the episode felt more like a "Series Finale, than Season Finale", which he called "a good thing", "Too many good shows go off into the sunset without a single resolution and this one at least strives for something more". He also argued that NBC should have "put a little more promotional push". He called it "challenging" and "interesting".
