= The Little Guy =

- Awake episode
- Bernard Mackenzie's body after he is murdered, which was made to look like a heart attack.
- Episode no.: Season 1 Episode 2
- Directed by: Jeffrey Reiner
- Written by: Kyle Killen
- Production code: 1ATR01
- Original air date: March 8, 2012
- Running time: 43 minutes

Guest appearances
- Laura Innes as Tricia Harper; Mark Harelik as Carl Kessel; Logan Miller as Cole; Brian Norris as Sam Harvinson; Chris McGarry as Dr. Banks; Daniela Bobadilla as Emma; Jordan Lund as Dr. Arthur Taylor; Jay Seals as Nat; Franco Vega as Uniform No. 1; Terrence Edwards as Uniform No. 2; Jeris Lee Poindexter as Homeless Man; Robert Beuth as Stan Drake

Episode chronology
← Previous "Pilot"	Next → "Guilty"

"The Little Guy" is the second episode of the American television police procedural fantasy drama Awake, which originally aired on NBC on March 8, 2012. The episode was written by series creator Kyle Killen and directed by executive producer Jeffrey Reiner. "The Little Guy" earned a Nielsen rating of 1.6, and was watched by 4.33 million viewers in its initial broadcast. The episode has generally received positive reviews, although many commentators criticized its ending (noting that the episode was not as good as the series pilot).

The show centers on Michael Britten (Jason Isaacs), a detective living in two separate realities after a car accident. In one reality (in which he wears a red wristband), his wife Hannah Britten (Laura Allen) survived the accident; in another reality (where he wears a green wristband), his son Rex Britten (Dylan Minnette) survived. In this episode Britten investigates the death of a homeless man, Bernard Mackenzie. Meanwhile, Hannah and Rex try to deal with each other's death in their respective realities, while Captain Tricia Harper (Laura Innes) is increasingly concerned about Britten's behavior. Harper speaks to Captain Carl Kessel (Mark Harelik) about their involvement in Britten's accident. Britten also learns that Rex and his best friend Cole (Logan Miller) are working on a motorcycle when they claimed to be going to the beach. The titular "little guy" in this episode is later revealed to be Detective Ed Hawkins (Kevin Weisman), who made his debut in "Say Hello to My Little Friend".

== Plot ==
In the "green reality" Rex (Dylan Minnette) complains about his clean clothes which, nevertheless, smell "weird" and "funny". Michael Britten (Jason Isaacs) remembers seeing his wife Hannah (Laura Allen) use fabric softener in the laundry, and realizes what he is doing differently. Dr. Judith Evans (Cherry Jones) congratulates Britten on using his dreams to access his subconscious and work out his problems. Soon after, Britten is called to work; Dr. Banks (Chris McGarry) tells him and his partner, Bird (Steve Harris), that Dr. Bernard MacKenzie (who was a fertility specialist) was brought in dead from a heart attack. After running a second test, however, the coroner confirmed that someone had given MacKenzie potassium chloride to induce a heart attack. The killer placed it in the diabetic MacKenzie's insulin, where it would be "untraceable". Shortly after transferring into "red reality", Britten discovers that Rex was having his mail delivered to his friend Cole (Logan Miller)'s house and asks Hannah if she knew anything about it. She prefers not to open it, as it would stir up emotions. Soon after, Britten sees a list of homeless people who have died and notices that MacKenzie is on the list. In the "red reality" he tells his partner, Efrem Vega (Wilmer Valderrama), to get the file (although the case was closed due to the lack of leads).

While Dr. Evans claims that Britten using his two realities is good, Dr. Lee notes that Britten's two realities are "problems" rather than "tools". However, Britten claims that he is fine with both realities. Meanwhile, Hannah goes to Cole's house and tells him she opened the box; he confirms that there is a camshaft inside. When she asks why Rex had the parts shipped to Cole's house, Cole takes her to a storage facility and shows her the motorcycle they were rebuilding. Hannah tells Cole to finish it, because Rex would have wanted him to. While Britten and Vega interview people in the neighborhood about Mackenzie's death, Britten finally finds a homeless man (Jeris Lee Poindexter) who recognizes MacKenzie's photo and talks to him. The man tells the detectives that he saw an "angry little guy" shoot MacKenzie. After transferring to the "green reality" Bird brings in a suspect, Dr. Arthur Taylor (Jordan Lund), but Britten is convinced of his innocence when he discovers that Taylor is 6 feet 7 inches (2.01 m). Taylor claims that he was at home watching television, and Britten asks him what he was watching that night. Hearing that Taylor was watching Sunday Night Football, Britten asks what in particular the commentators said at that time. Taylor describes the commentary in detail; Britten and Bird check the broadcast, and confirm that he was telling the truth. Police tech Nat (Jay Seals) confirms that someone hacked the clinic computer system and deleted a number of patient records. The IP address belongs to Laura Harvison, one of the clinic clients. Nat figures she does not have the computer skills to pull it off, but confirms that her 17-year-old son Sam (Brian Norris) might have.

Britten and Bird go to see Sam at his home; he claims that he was trying to find out about his father, who had cancer. Britten asks how tall he was; outside, Bird asks for an explanation and Britten tries to spin a story about a small window at the clinic that someone could have crawled through to poison MacKenzie. His partner warns Britten that coming up with theories and looking for evidence to fit is not standard procedure. That night, Rex and Cole work on their motorbike. Later, in the "red reality", Hannah tells Britten that she opened the package and was glad she did. She tells her husband about the motorcycle, and how the boys would claim they were going to the beach when they went off to work on it. At the station, Vega tells Britten that they have a new case; however, he insists on sticking with the MacKenzie shooting and checks photos of short criminals. The homeless man comes in and offers more information in return for lunch. The partners start arguing, and Captain Tricia Harper (Laura Innes) calls Britten into her office. Soon after, Britten asks Vega if he wants to lead a new case.

== Production ==
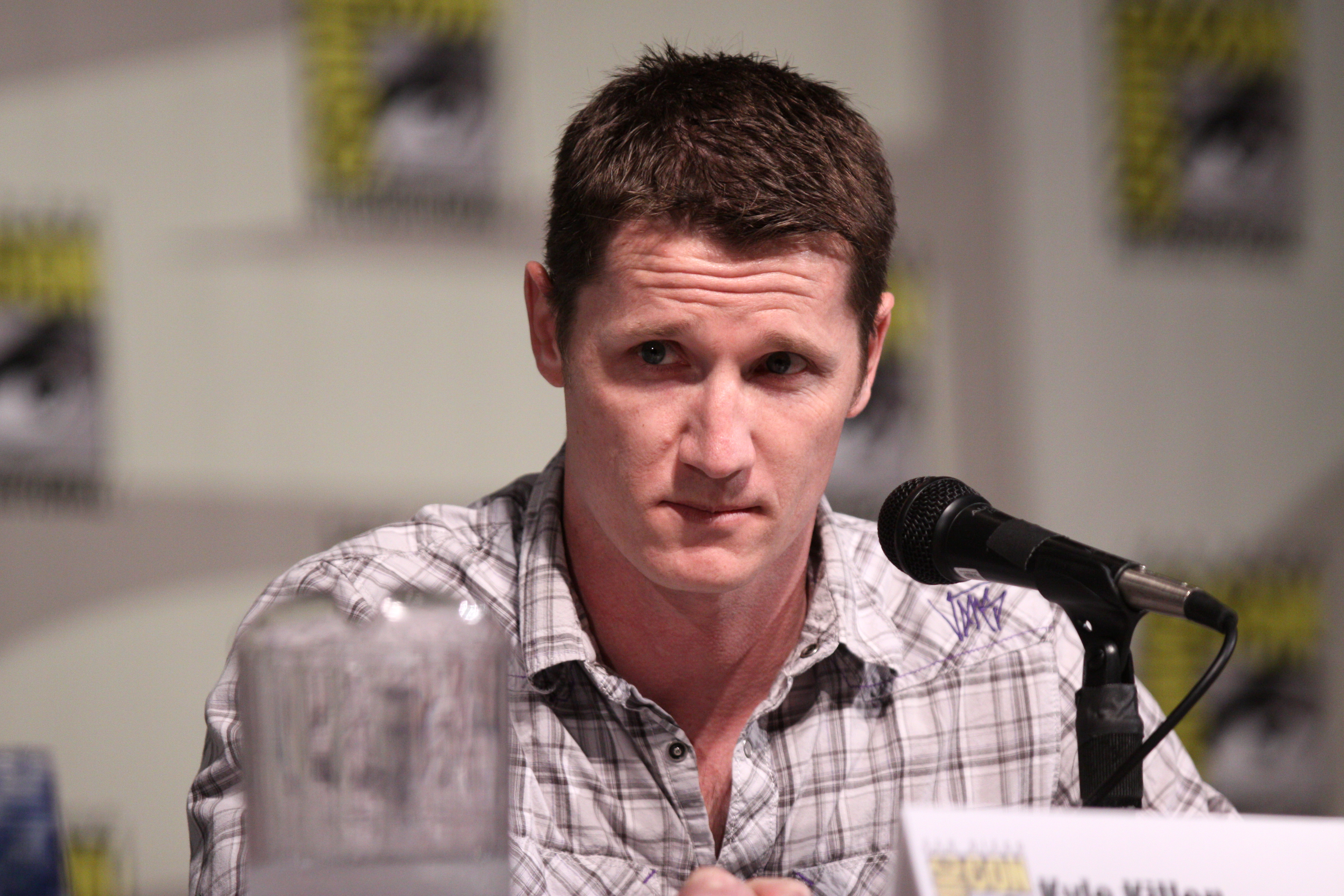
Series creator Kyle Killen, who wrote the episode

The episode was written by series creator Kyle Killen, and directed by executive producer Jeffrey Reiner. It was Killen's second writing credit, and Reiner's first directing credit in the series. Reiner tried to maintain the visual style set up by David Slade in the pilot episode.

In a pre-broadcast interview with IGN, Killen said that the "it was all a dream" option would not be explored. He stuck to the premise that "one of Detective Michael Britten's worlds is real and one is fake" and he will not be in a coma. The titular "little guy" is mentioned several times in this episode; this character is later revealed to be Detective Ed Hawkins (Kevin Weisman), who made his debut in "Say Hello to My Little Friend".

== Themes ==
Although it did not directly impact the ongoing storyline of Awake, "The Little Guy" introduced key thematic elements to the series. "The Little Guy" was noted for beginning to unravel the mystery of what really happened in Britten's accident, with Kessel and Harper discussing their involvement at the end of the episode. It was described as a show that does not need "a conspiracy narrative about the truth behind the accident", and a show that does not need mythology. The A.V. Club stated that Awake has "enough elements already".

Alan Sepinwall of HitFix observed that Harper and Kessel's knowledge involving the accident was "in the red world — and was not something Britten was present for". Sepinwall thought this meant Hannah was alive and Rex was dead. He also noted that "Killen has an absolutely brilliant plan for what's going on, why the Britten family was attacked, [and] why Mike is suddenly shifting from one reality to the other". Sepinwall compared the elements to The X-Files. He claimed that viewers may be pleased with the final scene (and enjoy the mythology), while some viewers will not "want to invest in the bigger mystery".

== Broadcast and reception ==
"The Little Guy" originally aired on NBC on March 8, 2012. The episode's initial broadcast was viewed by approximately 4.33 million viewers. "The Little Guy" earned a Nielsen rating of 1.6 with a 4 share, meaning that roughly 1.6 percent of all television-equipped households (and 4 percent of households watching television) were tuned in to the episode. In the United Kingdom, the episode was first broadcast on Sky Atlantic on May 11, 2012, and had 300,000 viewers, making it the third most-watched program for the channel behind Game of Thrones and Blue Bloods.

"The Little Guy" has generally received positive reviews from television critics. Emily VanDerWerff of The A.V. Club praised the episode. In her "B+" review, she claimed that the episode "isn't great TV like the pilot, but it's a very enjoyable murder mystery for much of its running time". VanDerWerff added that the episode "has some hiccups here and there". She criticized the final scene, adding that it made him want to "punch" something. Despite this, VanDerWerff thought that "there was plenty of fun" in the episode, other than the final two minutes". VanDerWerff stated that parts of the episode cannot be "connected".

IGN writer Matt Fowler gave the episode a complimentary review. Like A.V. Club's review, Fowler started by claiming that the episode was "not as tragically serene as the premiere episode" or "as good as the pilot". He noted that "the show has also ramped up the tension between Britten and his partners". Fowler was "happy that the investigation all came together and made sense". He called parts of the episode "dramatic" and "irony". He stated that the ending scene of the episode "introduces a full-on conspiracy into the mix, is risky, but I'm still in", "I fear that some folks might start to drop off from this show now simply because once you start defining something that was previously unexplained, you're going to lose those who had different ideas stubbornly cemented in their heads". Fowler gave the episode an "8.5 out of 10" score, classifying it as "great". TV Fanatic's round table team (including Carissa Pavlica, Lindey Kempton, Carla Day and Nick McHatton) were pleased with the episode. Pavlica claimed that it was "much better than [she] anticipated". McHatton simply wrote that the episode did "really well". Kempton though that "Rex's motorcycle was a nice touch, personal and not unrealistic, and it helped start developing his character a little bit".

Ross Bonaime of Paste magazine gave the episode a positive review. He started by noting that the episode "shows us how Awake will most likely work as a series". According to Bonaime, "the show never shows the faces of either MacKenzie, not even letting us know if they are supposed to be the same person or if they just share the same name". He stated that "Awake is also showing a great ability to show the impact of Britten's decisions he makes throughout the realities, regardless of how small they are". The episode had "sweet moments", stated Bonaime. Like other reviewers, Bonaime criticized the final scene of the episode". Bonaime concluded his review by giving the episode an "8.4 out of 10" rating, classifying it as "commendable". Caroline Preece from Den of Geek called it "promising", "interesting" and "fortunate", claiming that "the genre elements of Awake have received much more attention than the generic cop show trappings they're wrapped in". Despite this, she called it "strange".

Writing for Entertainment Weekly, Ken Tucker expressed many opinions on the episode. He claimed that it "reserved its deeper mystery for the final couple of minutes". Tucker thought that the show "may need an extra layer of viewers to keep it going". BuddyTV writer Laurel Brown called the episode "twisty" and "mind-bending", and called the episode's final scene "surprising", "potentially story-changing", "intriguing" and "problematic".
