= Jay Seals =

American actor

- Born: March 23, 1976 (age 50); Hasbrouck Heights, New Jersey, U.S.
- Occupation: Actor
- Years active: 2001–present

Jay Seals (born March 23, 1976) is an American actor, known for his recurring role in the television drama Mad Men on AMC from 2010 to 2015. Some of his other credits include the 2012 American television police procedural fantasy drama Awake, as a police tech, Nat, who is considered to be a "tech-savvy cop". He also appeared in numerous other television series and films.

Seals was scheduled to appear in the television pilot Metro, from the National Broadcasting Company (NBC) by Oscar-winning writer Stephen Gaghan, but that pilot was not picked up, which led to the actor being cast in Awake. In response to this, Seals said "It's just amazing how one job leads to another which leads to another."

== Personal life and career ==
Seals was born and raised in Hasbrouck Heights, New Jersey, where his family still lives. Seals had decided to go live in Los Angeles, California in 2007. As a kid, Seals wanted to be an actor, and, as a graduate of the Ramapo College, Seals' first television credit was Saturday Night Live, an American National Broadcasting Company (NBC) sketch comedy series; the actor appeared on the show in 2001. In Awake, when he was hired, the pilot episode was already shot, but the show's producers were doing retakes, and he was included in them, appearing in the pilot, as well as the second episode, "The Little Guy"; he was only credited as "star-billing" in the second episode. He plays Tom in the movie Bad Vegan and the Teleportation Machine.

Seals played Marvin Woodman of Topaz Pantyhose, one of the ad agency's key clients in October 1965, in Mad Men, and said "The reason that 'Mad Men' is such an amazing gig is that, industry-wise, everybody watches it". He said it was a "groundbreaking" job for him.

Seals almost became a lawyer, but chose acting instead.
