= The Beaver (film) =

2011 drama film directed by Jodie Foster

- Theatrical release poster
- Directed by: Jodie Foster
- Written by: Kyle Killen
- Produced by: Steve Golin; Keith Redmon; Ann Ruark
- Starring: Mel Gibson; Jodie Foster; Anton Yelchin; Jennifer Lawrence
- Cinematography: Hagen Bogdanski
- Edited by: Lynzee Klingman
- Music by: Marcelo Zarvos
- Production companies: Participant Media; Anonymous Content; Imagenation Abu Dhabi
- Distributed by: Summit Entertainment
- Release dates: March 16, 2011 (SXSW); May 6, 2011 (United States); May 19, 2011 (United Arab Emirates)
- Running time: 91 minutes
- Countries: United Arab Emirates; United States
- Language: English
- Budget: $21 million
- Box office: $7.3 million

The Beaver is a 2011 psychological drama film directed by Jodie Foster and written by Kyle Killen. It stars Mel Gibson, Foster, Anton Yelchin, and Jennifer Lawrence. Marking Gibson's and Foster's second collaboration since 1994's Maverick, it follows Walter Black, a depressed executive, who hits rock-bottom when his wife kicks him out of the house. At his lowest point, he begins to use a beaver hand puppet to communicate with people and overcome his issues.

The Beaver premiered at the SXSW Film Festival on March 16, 2011, and was released in the United States on May 6, 2011, by Summit Entertainment. The film received mixed reviews from critics who praised Foster's direction and performances of the cast but found the premise absurd. However, a series of controversies and criticisms surrounding Gibson regarding his statements and battery case affected the film's business, and it was a box office bomb, grossing just $7.3 million against its $21 million budget.

== Plot ==
Walter Black is a depressed CEO of Jerry Co., a toy company nearing bankruptcy. He is kicked out by his wife, to the relief of their elder son Porter. Walter moves into a hotel. After several suicide attempts, he develops an alternate personality represented by a beaver hand puppet found in the trash. He wears the puppet constantly, communicating solely by speaking as the beaver, which helps him to recover. He reestablishes a bond with his younger son Henry and then with his wife, although not with Porter. He also becomes successful again at work by creating a line of Mr. Beaver Building Kits for children.

Porter, who gets paid to write papers for schoolmates, is asked by Norah, whose brother has died, to write her graduation speech. He gets emotionally attached to Norah, feeling that she is repressing her desire to express herself regarding her brother's death, but his father's actions with the beaver puppet embarrass him. When Porter sprays "R.I.P. Brian" on a wall as an attempt to coax Norah to express her feelings about her brother, she is furious, and they are both arrested.

Walter's wife moves out of the house with the children because he lied to her about the puppet being part of a treatment plan monitored by his psychiatrist. She feels she can no longer communicate with her husband and that he is suffering from a dissociative identity disorder, with the beaver taking him over.

Part of Walter's personality realizes what he has put his family through and wants to get rid of the beaver to get back together with his family, but the beaver 'resists'. Walter finally takes the puppet out of his life by cutting off his arm at the elbow with a circular saw. After surgery, he is equipped with a prosthetic hand and is placed in a psychiatric hospital.

Norah reconnects with Porter. She starts reading the speech he wrote, but stops and admits publicly that she did not write it herself. She switches to explaining the value of truth and the trauma caused to her by her brother's death some years previously. Porter realizes the value of his father and reunites with him at the hospital.

Walter Black becomes himself again and returns to a normal life.

== Cast ==
- Mel Gibson as Walter Black, a depressed and troubled husband/The Beaver, a hand puppet found in the trash.
- Jodie Foster as Meredith Black, Walter's wife
- Anton Yelchin as Porter Black, the teenage son of Walter and Meredith who lobbies his mother to get a divorce
- Jennifer Lawrence as Norah, Porter's love interest
- Cherry Jones as Morgan Newell, vice president of Walter's toy company
- Riley Thomas Stewart as Henry Black, the younger son of Walter and Meredith Black
- Zachary Booth as Jared
- Jeff Corbett as volunteer dad
- Matt Lauer as himself

== Production ==
Prior to production, the screenplay for The Beaver topped The Black List in 2008. On a budget of $21 million, The Beaver was filmed in Westchester County, New York and New York City. A portion of the movie was filmed at White Plains Senior High School in White Plains, New York. Filming was completed in November 2009.

Before Gibson was hired, Steve Carell and Jim Carrey were both signed on to star at different stages of production.

== Release ==
The Beaver had its world premiere at the South by Southwest film festival on March 16, 2011, where the Los Angeles Times reported that it was given "a relatively warm embrace".

The film had a limited release in 22 theaters on May 9, 2011.

== Reception ==
=== Box office ===
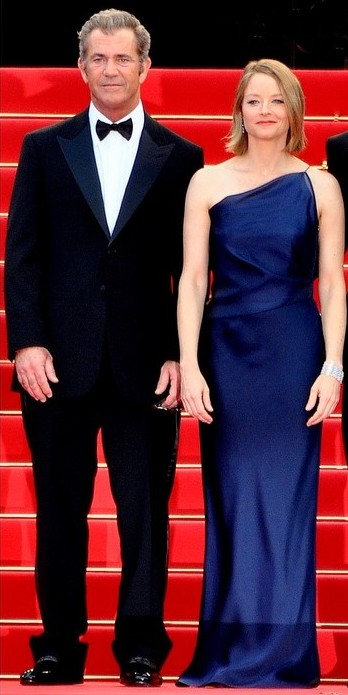
Mel Gibson and Jodie Foster promoting the film at the 2011 Cannes Film Festival

Over its opening weekend, the film grossed $107,577. Entertainment Weekly and several media outlets reported that the film's box office performance was a "flop" with a haul of only $4,890 per theater against its production budget of $21 million (not including marketing costs). Entertainment Weekly compared the box office gross of The Beaver against Mel Gibson's other most recent "box office failure", 2010's Edge of Darkness—which debuted to a per-theater average of $5,615 at more than 3,000 locations—and the box office success of 2010's Black Swan which grossed a per-theater average of $88,863 in limited release at only 16 theaters. The Beaver was the worst debut for a film directed by Foster.

The distributor Summit Entertainment had originally planned for a wide release of The Beaver for the weekend of May 20; but, after the initial box office returns came in, the company changed course and decided to give the film a "limited art-house run". Michael Cieply of The New York Times observed on June 5, 2011, that the film had cleared about $1 million, making it a certified "flop". The film's director, Foster, said the film did not do well with American audiences because it was a dramedy and "very often Americans are not comfortable with [that]".

Before its release, much of the coverage focused on the unavoidable association between the protagonist's issues and Mel Gibson's own well-publicized personal and legal problems, including a conviction of battery of his ex-girlfriend in March. Time wrote: "The Beaver is a somber, sad domestic drama featuring an alcoholic in acute crisis. Sound familiar, almost like a documentary? It’s hard to separate Gibson’s true-life story from what’s happening onscreen."

=== Critical response ===
The Beaver received mixed reviews from critics, with review aggregator Rotten Tomatoes reporting a score of 62% based on reviews from 185 critics and an average rating of 6.1/10. The consensus reads, "Jodie Foster's visual instincts and Mel Gibson's all-in performance sell this earnest, straightforward movie." Metacritic, which uses a weighted average, assigned the film a score of 60 out of 100, based on 40 critics, indicating "mixed or average" reviews.

Roger Ebert gave the film two and a half stars out of four, saying, "The Beaver is almost successful, despite the premise of its screenplay, which I was simply unable to accept."
