= Pilot (Awake) =

- Awake episode
- Michael and Hannah Britten mourn over the loss of their son, Rex. The episode introduces the main characters and concept of the series.
- Episode no.: Season 1 Episode 1
- Directed by: David Slade
- Written by: Kyle Killen
- Editing by: Jordan Goldman; Paul Trejo
- Production code: 1ATR79
- Original air date: March 1, 2012
- Running time: 43 minutes

Episode chronology
← Previous —	Next → "The Little Guy"

"Pilot" is the pilot episode of the American television police procedural fantasy drama Awake, which originally aired on NBC on March 1, 2012. Written by series creator Kyle Killen, "Pilot" earned a Nielsen rating of 2.0, being watched by 6.247 million viewers upon its initial broadcast. Directed by David Slade, it became the highest-rated non-sports program in its respective time slot on NBC in over a year. The episode has generally received positive reviews, with many critics commenting on the episode's unique script, and the cast members, particularly Jason Isaacs' performance as Michael Britten, who they felt effectively embodied the characteristics of the lead role. It was one of eight honorees at the Critics' Choice Television Awards.

The pilot introduced the main character, Michael Britten, a detective who works for the Los Angeles Police Department. He is involved in a fatal accident with his family. Michael is conflicted with two parallel realities; in one reality, in which he wears a red wristband, his wife Hannah Britten (Laura Allen) survived the accident, and in another reality, in which he wears a green wristband, his son Rex Britten (Dylan Minnette) survived. Michael does not know which reality is real, and sees two separate therapists: Dr. John Lee (BD Wong) in the "red reality", and Dr. Judith Evans (Cherry Jones) in the "green reality". Michael deals with a kidnapping in the "green reality", and a murder in the "red reality".

The concept of Awake was devised by Killen, who previously created the American television drama Lone Star for the Fox network. NBC encouraged Killen to conceive a concept for a future television series after Lone Star's cancellation. Although it was inspired by the processes of dreaming, its script was cited as potentially being too complex for mainstream American television.

== Plot ==
Detective Michael Britten (Jason Isaacs) is at therapy sessions with Dr. John Lee (BD Wong) and Dr. Judith Evans (Cherry Jones). Having fully recovered from his injuries, Michael recalls the night that he and his family were involved in a serious car accident. He reveals that every time he goes to sleep, he is conflicted between two realities; In one reality, his wife Hannah Britten (Laura Allen) survived the accident, but his son Rex Britten (Dylan Minnette) is pronounced dead at the scene, while in the second reality, Hannah died in the accident instead of Rex.

Michael is trying to juggle his lives in the two realities, and wears a red wristband on his wrist in the reality where Hannah is alive and a green one in the reality where Rex is alive. In the Rex, or green, reality, Michael has noticed that Rex has focused a lot on tennis lately, as it was his mother's sport. Rex's tennis coach Tara (Michaela McManus) has been talking with Rex lately about his feelings. In the Hannah, or red, reality, Hannah is trying to write the late Rex out of their lives, wanting to move and try for another child.

Michael has a different partner in each reality. In the "green reality", his partner is Isaiah "Bird" Freeman (Steve Harris), while Efrem Vega (Wilmer Valderrama) is a uniformed officer. In the "red reality", Efrem is his newly promoted partner, while Isaiah has been transferred to a different precinct. Michael starts to realize that things can transfer from reality to reality, as the clue "611 Waverly," pertaining to a case, is shown to Michael in one reality before it helps him save a girl from being murdered by a quick change serial killer in the other.

Both Dr. Lee and Dr. Evans attempt to diagnose what is going on with Michael. They both see it as a coping mechanism, and both insist that the other reality is a dream. To try to prove this to Michael, Dr. Evans has Michael read a part of the United States Constitution, as if that reality was a dream, Michael could not have done so, unless he had memorized the Constitution. Michael learned that he had alcohol in his system the night of the car accident, with Dr. Lee hypothesizing that Michael has this dream because he feels guilty for killing his son.

At the end of the episode, Michael comes to the conclusion that he wants to live with both of his family members. As he goes to sleep in the red reality, Hannah (who Michael has told about the "green reality") tells Michael to enjoy Rex, and to tell him she loves him for her. Then, Michael goes to sleep, transferring to the "green reality".

== Production ==
=== Conception ===
Kyle Killen, the series' creator, devised the concept of the series, which was originally titled REM until the episode was green-lit by NBC, in May 2011. It was described as a procedural mixture that is based on the life of a detective experiencing a parallel universe after a car accident with his family. NBC picked up the pilot episode of Awake in February 2011. Killen previously created the American television drama Lone Star (2010) for the Fox network, which was canceled shortly after airing two episodes due to low ratings. Killen stated that the cancellation of Lone Star was a good platform to explore new ideas for a potential television show. He felt that Awake had a similar concept to Lone Star, and he wanted to continue the idea of living in "two spaces". In an interview with The Hollywood Reporter, he further elaborated on the conception of the series:

My wife is an ER doctor and she once had a patient whose chief complaint was that they were covered in worms. And she went in to to [sic] see him [and] it was a 23-year-old guy who seemed completely sane, who remembered his name, what year it was but was totally convinced he was covered in worms and couldn't understand why other people weren't reacting to that. It stuck with me how reliant you are on this little piece of material between your ears and what it tells you is real is what you think is real. I had the idea and been interested in someone who couldn't tell the difference between their dreams and reality. And I think I had a lot of stuff I was still playing with when Lone Star went down.

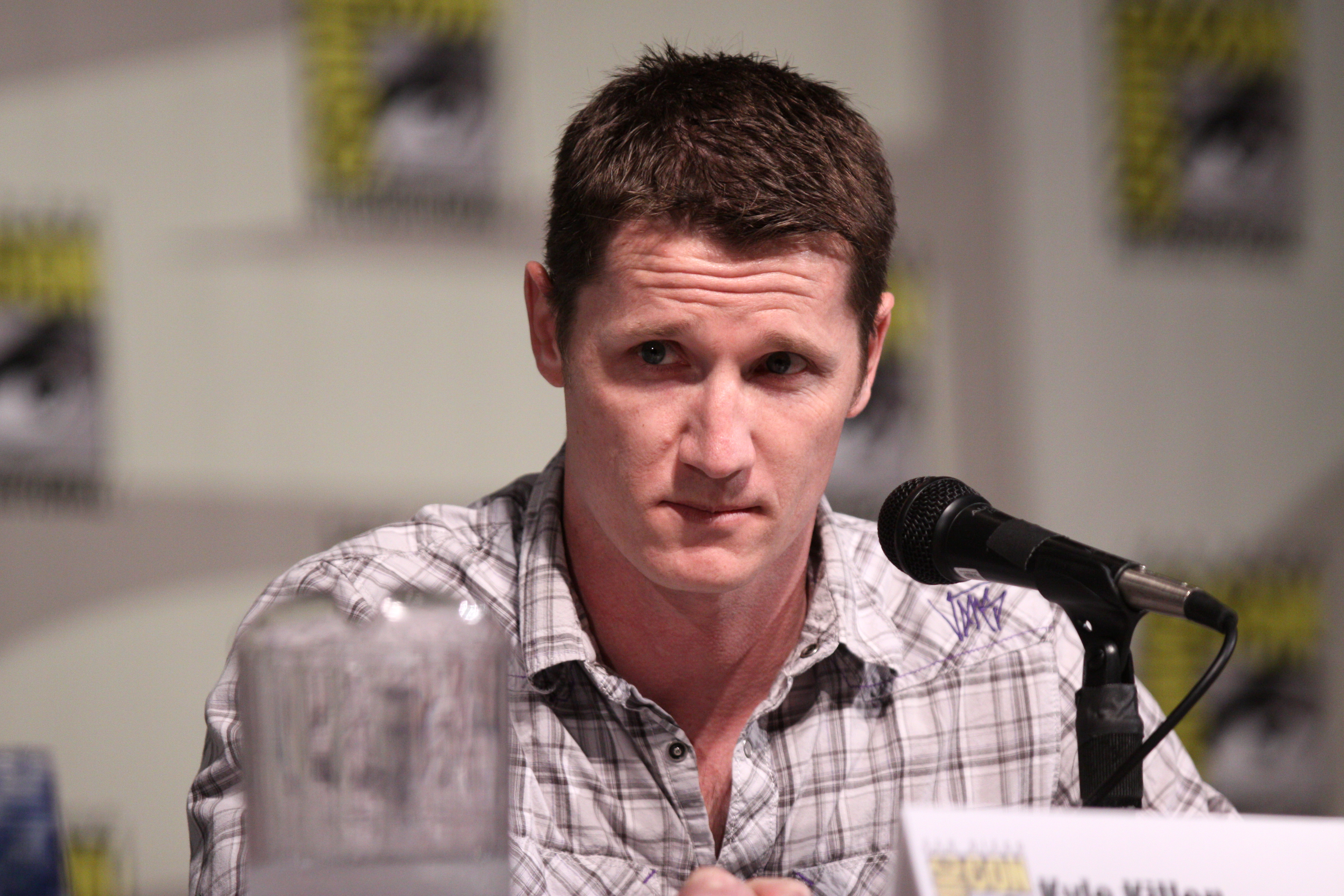
Kyle Killen sought inspiration from the dreaming process.

Killen sought inspiration from the dreaming process, adding: "The concept of the way your dreams feel real, the way you seem to experience them as something that you don't blink at until something crazy happens that sort of bursts that balloon. I think I became interested in the question of what if nothing ever popped that balloon? What if you couldn't tell the difference between when you were awake and when you were asleep? And then I started looking for a way to marry those two ideas up, and a few months later we had Awake."

Jennifer Salke, the president of the entertainment division of NBC, encouraged Killen to conceive a concept for a future television series after the cancellation of Lone Star. Within a few weeks, Killen sent a rough draft of the script to his agent Marc Korman. Korman was so impressed by the script that, though it was after midnight, he went into the room where his sick wife was sleeping, and got into bed with her. Korman phoned Salke, and stated that the script was "remarkable", and praised Killen claiming that "for a guy who has never written a procedural show in his life", he is "making two cases work". Initially, Salke and Korman looked to sell acquisition rights to the Fox Broadcasting Company. Although it successfully made its way into the lower executive branches of the company, the script was declined by entertainment president Kevin Reilly, who felt apprehensive upon reading it. Gary Newman, chairman of 20th Century Fox Television, opted not to develop a deal with cable television networks. Newman believed that it should be a network show, and did not accept that the difference between cable and network dramas was their degree of intelligence.

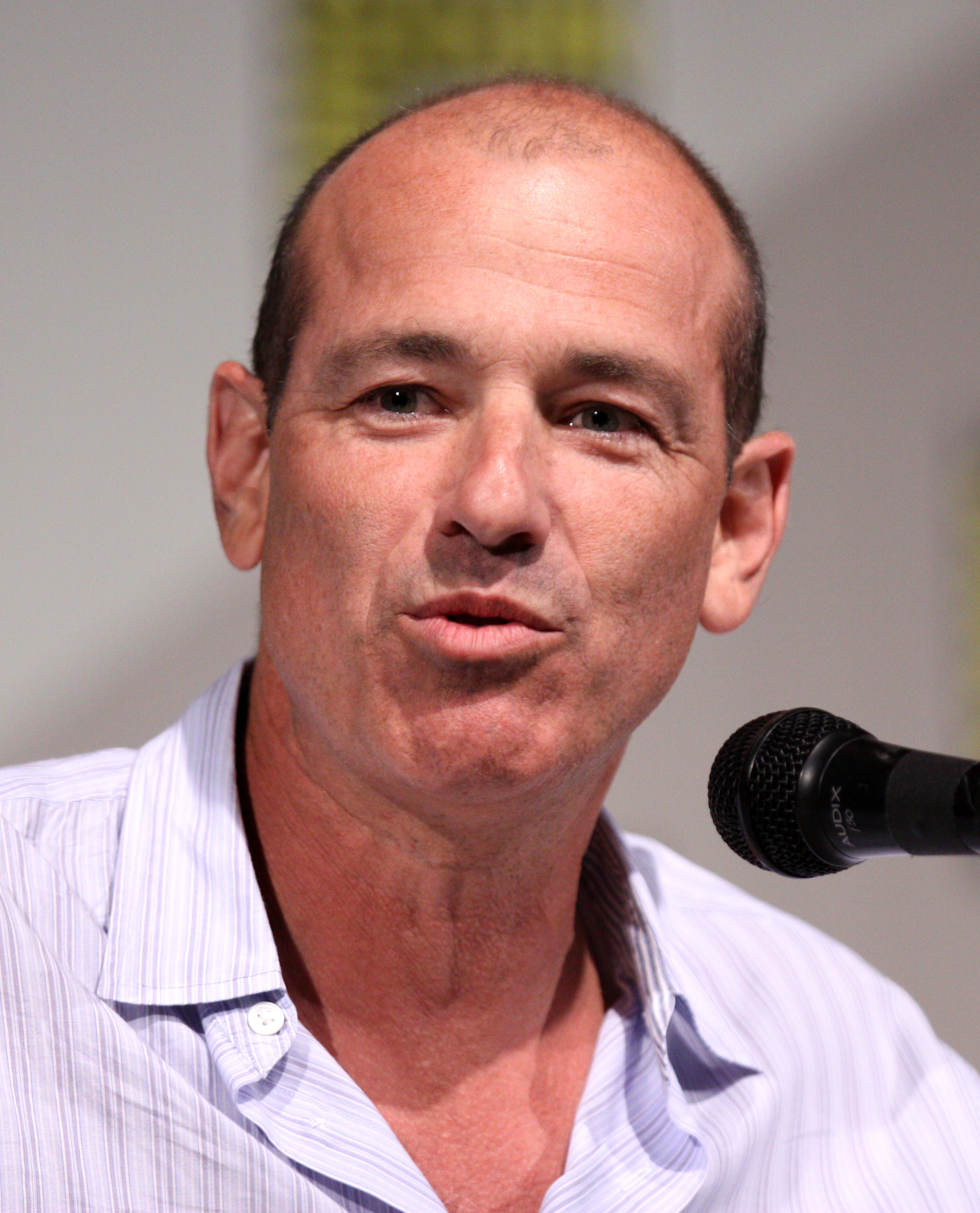
Howard Gordon was chosen as the showrunner for the series.

Gordon was chosen as the showrunner for the series by Killen. Gordon commended the pilot script at first glance. Gordon originally read the script on a flight to New York City. "I read the pilot, and once I got past my envy, I was struck by the voice," he stated. "So few writers have real voices. Kyle is disarmingly self-effacing; and at the same time, he's disarmingly confident. It's that duality thing: On the one hand, he's open; on the other, he's closed." Gordon later compared the television series to The Good Wife. He said that The Good Wife has so many procedural aspects that you have to decide which format to use each week. He compared it to Awake, saying, then, "What makes an Awake episode?" "Pilot" was written by Killen, and directed by David Slade.

=== Casting ===
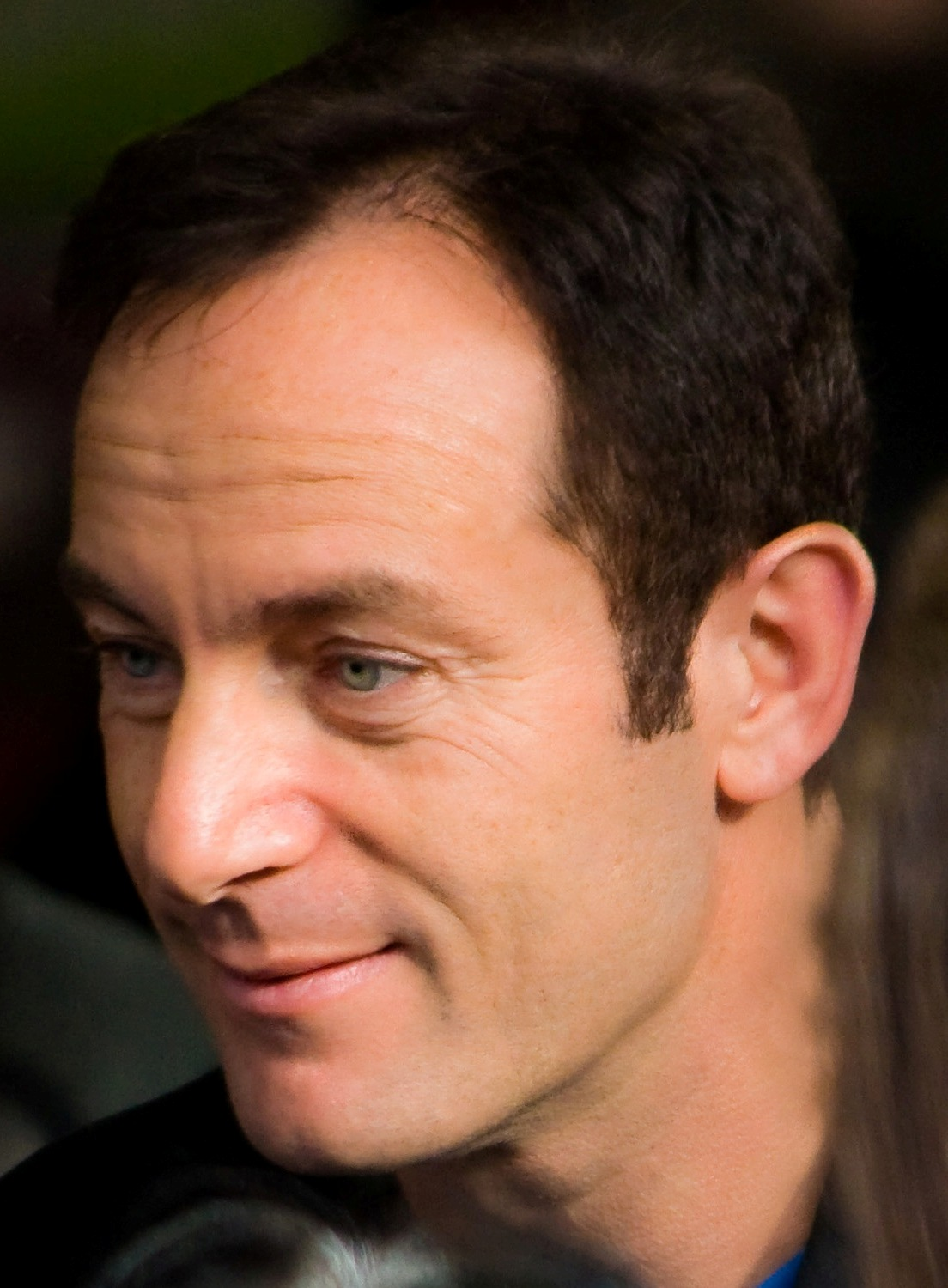
Jason Isaacs was the first actor to be cast in the series.

In February 2011, Jason Isaacs obtained the role of Michael Britten, the central character of the series. Gordon summated the premise of the character: "He's a guy who goes to sleep, wakes up, he's with his wife, goes to sleep, wakes up, and he's with his son. And so—and he's a cop who sees clues and details that crossover from one world to the next, and he uses that insight to solve crimes." Killen thought that the premise behind the series would be relatable to audiences, making it easier to expand his fanbase. "I think there were aspects of Lone Star that were more difficult to get a wider, broader audience interested in," he articulated. "[The main character] was somebody that you couldn't decide if you liked or hated, and I think that Britten's dilemma is something that we're not only sympathetic for, but somehow we want him to win." The following month, producers approached Laura Allen to play Hannah Britten. Michaela McManus initially received the role of Hannah, but later received the role of Tara instead, whom Allen originally auditioned to play.

In March 2011, Dylan Minnette was cast as Rex Britten, the son of Michael Britten, alongside five other cast members. Minnette commended the series' script, and noted the auditioning sequence was fast. He stated, "The process of getting the job actually went by really fast because the first audition Kyle Killen [...] was in the room, Jason [Isaacs] was in the room, the cast director was in the room and the director was in the room. David Slade. And they were all there, for the first audition and I was like 'Wow! Okay.'" Minnette received the role two weeks after his audition. Other cast members include Wilmer Valderrama and Steve Harris, who each play Britten's partner in one reality, while Cherry Jones and BD Wong each serve as his therapist in one reality. Wong chose the role in lieu of his position on the police procedural television drama Law & Order: Special Victims Unit.

=== Writing ===
Killen avouched that writing the episode's script was one of the more difficult processes of creating the series. He and his writing team would often get confused with exchanging and executing ideas for the script; as a result, they created outlines and distinguished them in green and red ink. Slade edited the language to better separate the ideas. "So the things that are initially confusing to us when we are just trying to break story, I think by the time they reach an audience, so much attention has been paid to how to make it clear where you are that all of the little tricks that we needed sort of go away. And hopefully when you see it on the screen, you are pretty instantly oriented as to which world you are in."

The complexity of the script of the pilot episode and the show's concept was cited as a potential issue for the series. Salke evaluated that viewers will enjoy the "clever mythology that overlap and affect each other in very interesting ways", despite the series' Sliding Doors-like script. Upon reading the script, Isaacs felt that it was "incredibly hard" and complicated to comprehend. "Do you always know what reality you're in? [...] That's become a [gift]. It was hard but I quite like hard work." Isaacs later suggested that it might be too brooding for mainstream American television, and that it could potentially be the "U-bend of scripts". He stated that every pilot comes from people who have "amazing prestige", and that there are many "talented people, but the head of the network chooses only one." Despite such concerns, Gordon asserted that the concept of Awake was a concept that you could understand if you sat down and paid attention to it properly.

== Broadcast and reception ==
"Pilot" originally aired on NBC on March 1, 2012. It debuted as a midseason replacement for The Firm, which moved to Saturdays shortly before Awake's premiere. The episode's initial broadcast was viewed by approximately 6.247 million viewers. "Pilot" earned a Nielsen rating of 2.0, with a 5 share, meaning that roughly 2.0 percent of all television-equipped households, and 5 percent of households watching television, were tuned in to the episode.

The episode debuted on the Global network in Canada simultaneously with the NBC broadcast. It garnered 1.2 million viewers, making it the twenty-eighth most watching program of the week, according to BBM Canada. In the United Kingdom, the episode was first broadcast on Sky Atlantic on May 4, 2012, and obtained 334,000 million viewers, making it the third most-viewed program for the channel behind Game of Thrones and Blue Bloods. In June 2011, Awake's pilot was one of eight honorees in the "Most Exciting New Series" category at the Critics' Choice Television Awards, voted by journalists who had seen the pilots.

The pilot episode has generally received positive reviews from television critics, who praised its storylines. Rachel Ray of The Telegraph called the premiere episode "impressive", while Tierney Bricker of E! Online commented that he "instantly fell in love with the storyline of one man living in two realities in order to stay with the people he loves." NPR's Linda Holmes asserted that "Pilot" laid the foundation for several emotional storylines, ultimately evaluating it as amongst the strongest showings in recent memory; "This is a richly interesting narrative, and it's worth watching closely, and if you do that, it's entirely digestible. It's also beautifully acted and written, packed with genuinely vexing questions about grief and dreaming, and—of all things—thoughtful." Holmes added that it was very engaging in contrast to similar television shows. James Poniewozik of Time noted that while its concept seemed melodramatic, the episode "focuses unflinchingly on the subject of loss, yet manages to be not a downer or painful to watch, but moving, absorbing and even hopeful." Poniewozik affirmed that the telecast effectively solved the issues that were raised about the series. He wrote, "Awake handles the confusion problem well: yes, it takes more concentration than a Law & Order, but it's no Inception in its twistiness. Michael himself needs to hold on to markers to anchor his sense of reality—for instance, he wears a red and a green wristband in the existences in which his wife and his son are alive, respectively—and those help us follow along too." Reuters' Tim Molloy avouched that the episode was the "best new show of the season": "Despite the most complicated narrative since ABC's Lost kept skipping through time, Awake makes a fast, emotional connection that gives viewers an almost immediate stake in the lives of its compelling characters."

RedEye journalist Curt Wagner stated that the series was "well acted and smartly written". BuddyTV writer Laurel Brown called the pilot a "great episode". In his "A" grade review, Emily VanDerWerff of The A.V. Club said that the episode was a "great piece of televised art", describing the script as "witty, warm, and soulful". She wrote, "David Slade's direction conveys the emotional world of the show so well that you could watch it on mute and grasp most of what's going on," "At the end of the episode, you'll leave feeling like you've seen something unique and wonderful, something worth watching every week in an increasingly crowded television landscape." "Pilot" was highly anticipated by Los Angeles Times journalist Robert Lloyd, who observed that "it promised to be one of the year's best and most interesting new series." In a pre-broadcast review, Matt Fowler from IGN gave the pilot a "10 out of 10" classifying it as a "masterpiece". Some commentators were less enthusiastic than the general consensus. Writing for The Washington Post, Hank Stuever felt that despite having high ambitions, the pilot episode was slow and drowsy.

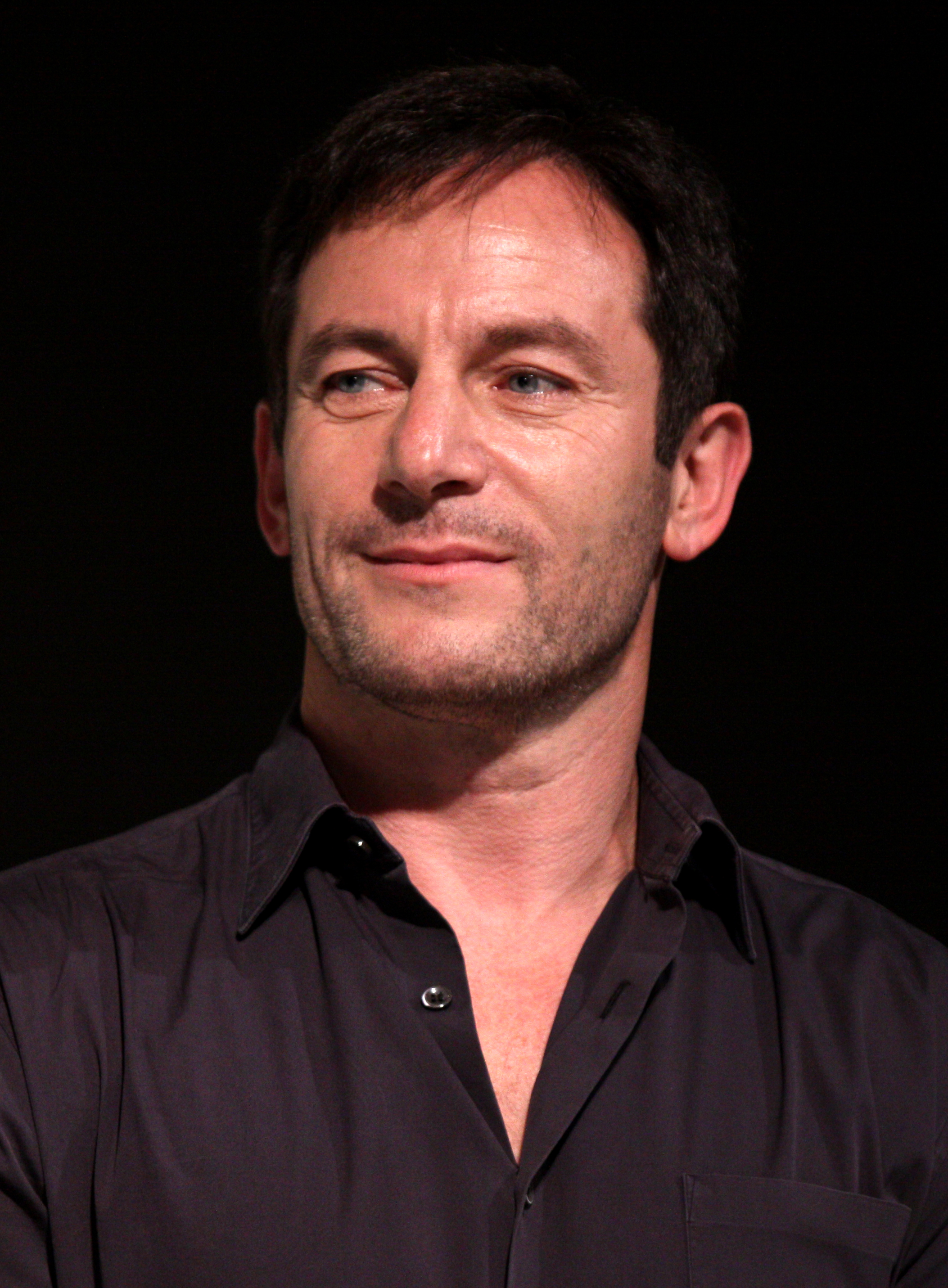
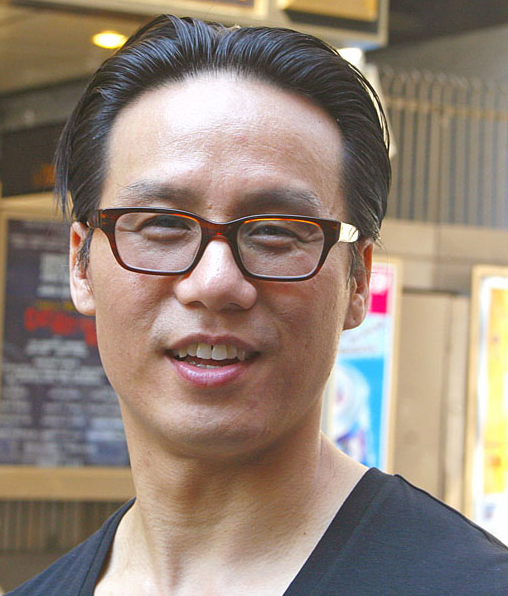
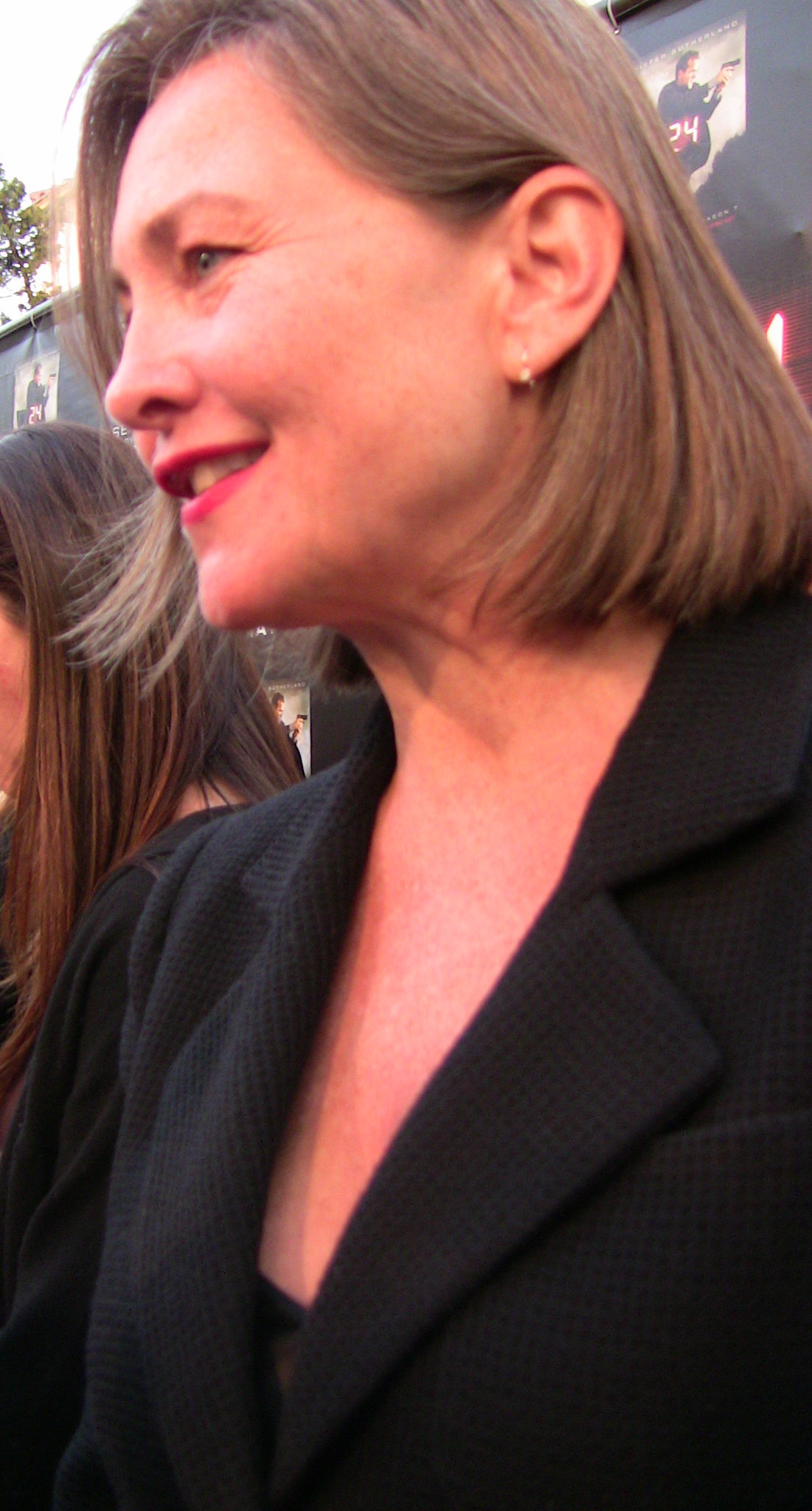
Jason Isaacs' (left) performance was praised by television critics, who felt that he accurately embodied the role of Michael Britten. Commentators also cited the performances of BD Wong (center) and Cherry Jones (right) as highlights. They felt that Isaacs' performance deserved an Emmy Award.

Critics lauded the cast's acting, specifically Isaacs' performance. VanDerWerff concluded that the cast's performances were "delicate and almost perfect", while Wagner felt that Isaacs was well-suited to the lead role and could easily captivate the audience; "his touching, solid work grounds everything. He shows viewers what lengths one man in pain might go to hold onto those he loves. And it's heartbreaking." Denise Duguay of the Montreal Gazette thought that Isaacs evoked a "reservedness" and ambiguity that attracted viewers to his character. Tim Goodman of The Hollywood Reporter echoed analogous sentiment, writing, "He perfectly conveys a man struggling with two horrible options." Poniewozik iterated: "Isaacs is utterly compelling: mature, soulful and wearied. Literally, he never gets a rest, and must deal in one reality with a son acting out from rage, in another with a spouse who is moving on at a different pace, and in different ways, from him." Although Stuever opined that Isaacs failed to engage the audience, he praised the performances of Wong and Jones; "Jones and Wong [...] are excellent and even vaguely sinister as the dueling shrinks."

Ken Tucker of Entertainment Weekly was keen to Isaacs' acting in the series. "It helps enormously to have Isaacs playing the lead. This actor knows how to convey a gravity that contrasts well with the series' airy concept, but he avoids becoming heavy and morose." Fowler stated that Isaacs' performance "delivers a graceful and subdued performance as a man who, on a daily basis, must taste both heaven and hell. A man full of guilt, but also gratitude." Fowler noted than Allen and Minnette's performances in the series "deserve some praise for having to play characters who are also dealing with loss, but without the benefit of being able to see their lost loved one like Britten can."
