= Rex Britten =

- Awake character
- First appearance: "Pilot"
- Last appearance: "Turtles All the Way Down"
- Created by: Kyle Killen
- Portrayed by: Dylan Minnette
- Reality: Green

In-universe information
- Gender: Male
- Occupation: School student
- Family: Parents: Michael and Hannah
- Children: (potential child with Emma)
- Nationality: American

Rex David Britten is a fictional main character in the American police procedural drama television series Awake. He is portrayed by Dylan Minnette. The character first appeared in "Pilot" and last appeared in "Turtles All the Way Down". He appears in Michael's green reality (where Hannah is dead from the car crash). This is because it is his favorite color. Rex was created and designed by series creator and executive producer Kyle Killen after he created and developed the series Lone Star for the Fox network; Killen had been called in to pitch a new drama for NBC after the cancellation of Lone Star.

As a teenager, Rex is the only son and child of Michael and Hannah. He is currently a teenager at school.

== Role in Awake ==
Rex Britten is the son of Michael and Hannah. He is the only child in the family, and is featured in Michael's green reality (where Hannah is dead from the car crash). He is currently an American teenager at school.

== Character ==
=== Creation ===
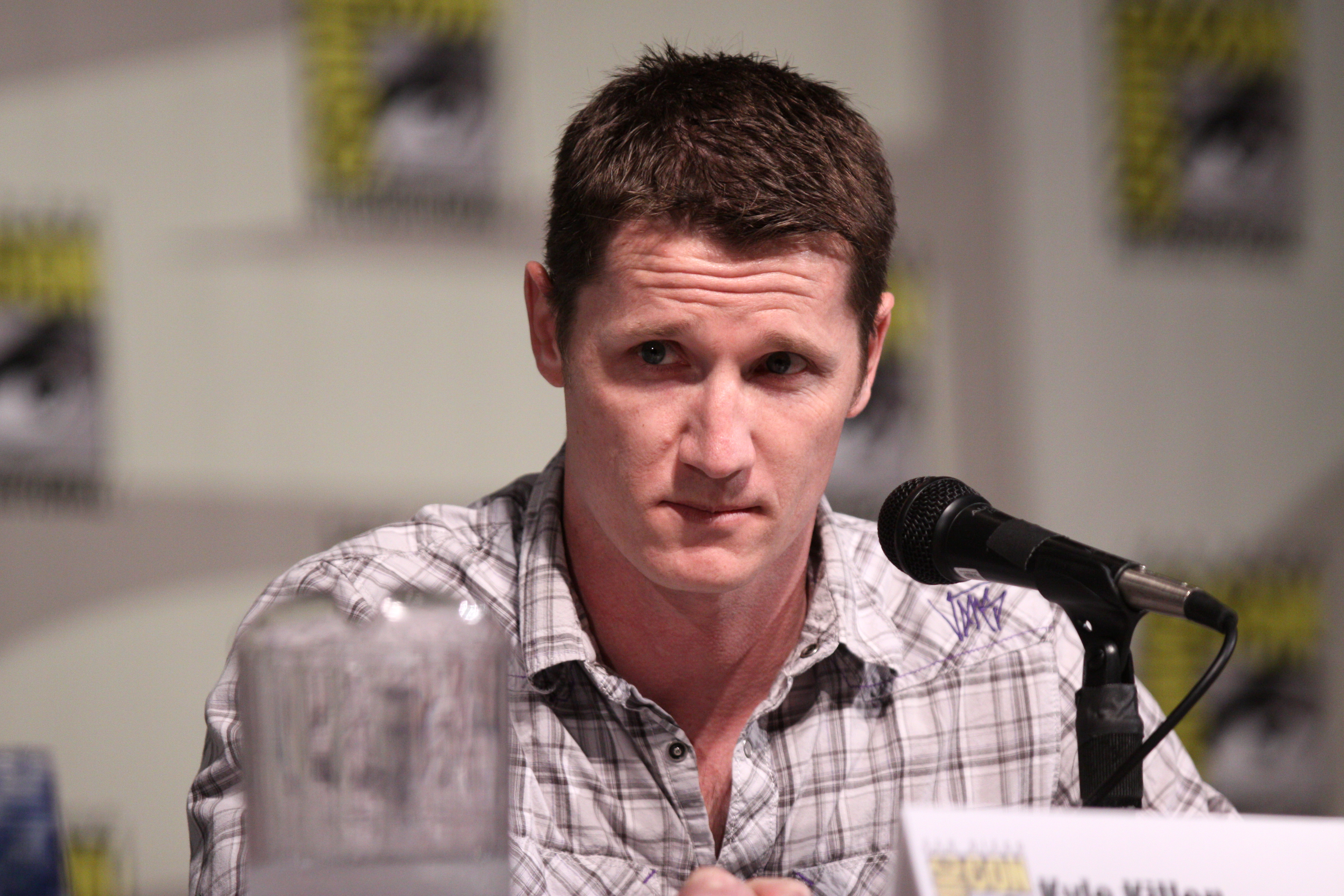
Kyle Killen (pictured) created Rex after developing Lone Star for the Fox network.

Kyle Killen conceived of Rex and the rest of the family and series in 2011 after a report that NBC had purchased the series from the creator Killen, under the original name REM. Killen had been called in to pitch a new drama for NBC, after Jennifer Salke, the president of the entertainment division of NBC, encouraged Killen to conceive a concept for a new drama television series after the cancellation of Lone Star on the Fox network. Within a few weeks, Killen sent a rough draft of the script to his agent Marc Korman. "It was 1 or 2 o'clock in the morning, and I remember I was so freaked out by the script that I went upstairs to our guest bedroom where my wife was sick with the flu and I got into bed with her," recalled Korman. "I called Jen and said: 'I'm telling you, this script is remarkable. I've never read a pilot like this, and for a guy who has never written a procedural show in his life, he's actually making two cases work". Initially, Salke and Korman looked to sell acquisition rights to Fox.

Rex made his debut with the rest of the Britten family on March 1, 2012, in "Pilot" on NBC. He marked his last appearance on May 24, 2012, in "Turtles All the Way Down" on the same network as in first episode.

=== Casting ===
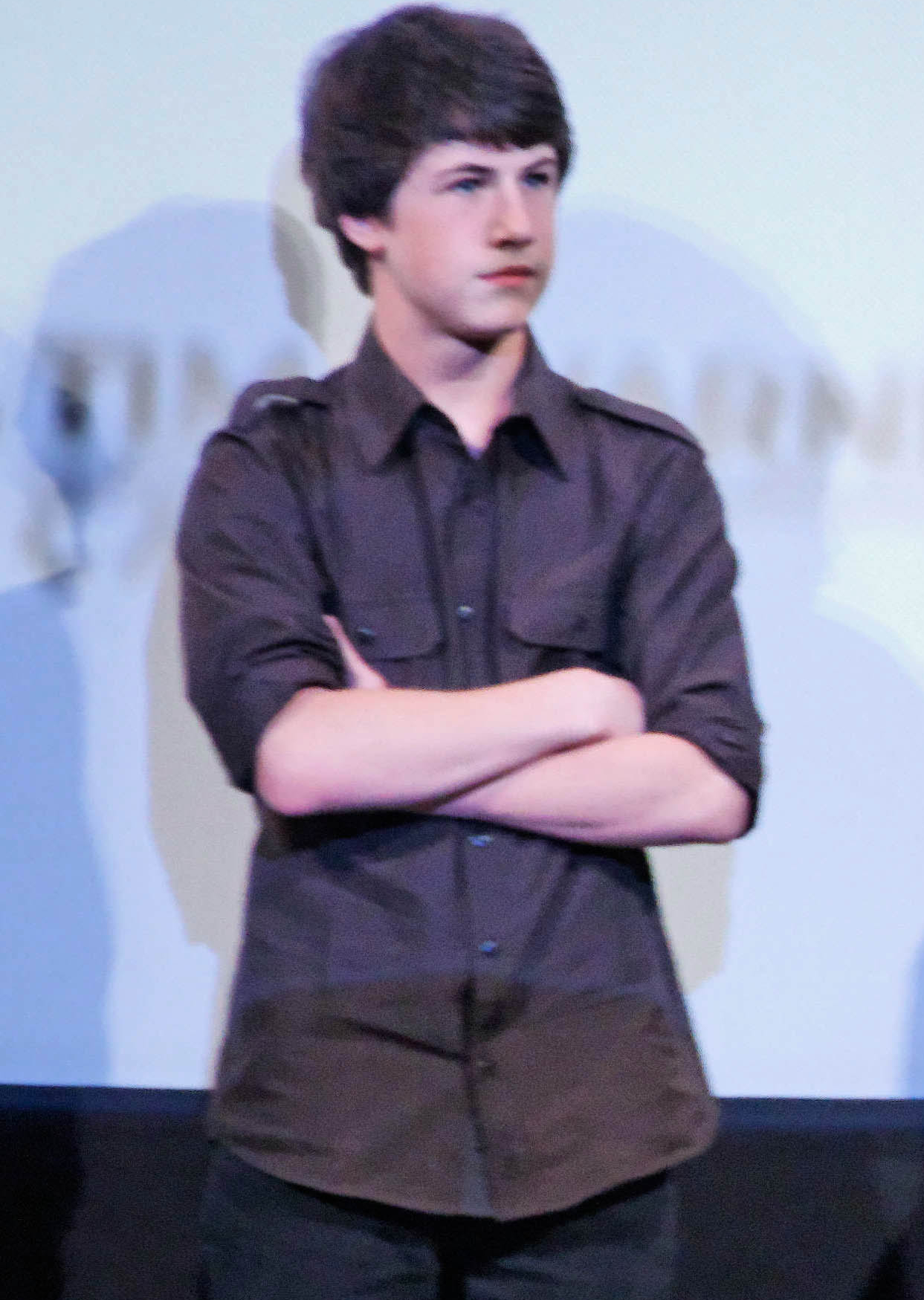
Dylan Minnette (pictured) obtained the role of Rex Britten in March 2011, alongside five other members.

In March 2011, Dylan Minnette obtained the role of the character. Minnette commended the episode's script, and noted the auditioning sequence was fast. He stated, "The process of getting the job actually went by really fast because the first audition Kyle Killen [...] was in the room, Jason [Isaacs] was in the room, the cast director was in the room and the director was in the room. David Slade. And they were all there, for the first audition and I was like 'Wow! Okay.'" Minnette received the role two weeks after his audition. According to an interview, Dylan Minnette himself is a fan of the character and series.

=== Personality ===
Since his mother's death in the "green reality", he has been very emotional and angry. He had a tennis racket which he put in his bag after his mother died: his friend Cole accidentally broke it, in "Oregon". Rex and his friend Cole also claim to be going to the beach, although they are really going to work on their motorbike, a bike Rex had worked on for years. He doesn't like "cereal and oatmeal night", which is their dinner for the night, he criticized it, claiming that his mother "cooked actual food".

== Reception ==
=== Analysis ===
Dylan Minnette' role as Rex has been met with praise by many television commentators, who felt he effectively embodied the characteristics of the lead role. Kelly West of Cinema Blend praised his role. He claimed that "Laura Allen and Dylan Minnette also deliver strong performances as Michael’s wife and son respectively. As do Wilmer Valderrama and Steve Harris, who play Michael's partners". Rex's motorbike was praised by TV Fanatic's Lindey Kempton called it "a nice touch", "personal", "not unrealistic", and "it helped start developing his character a little bit".
