= Hannah Britten =

- Awake character
- First appearance: "Pilot"
- Last appearance: "Turtles All the Way Down"
- Created by: Kyle Killen
- Portrayed by: Laura Allen
- Reality: Red

In-universe information
- Species: Human
- Gender: Female
- Occupation: Housewife
- Spouse: Michael Britten
- Children: Rex Britten
- Nationality: American

Hannah Britten is a fictional protagonist in the American police procedural drama television series Awake. She is portrayed by Laura Allen. The character first appeared in "Pilot" and last appeared in the series finale "Turtles All the Way Down". Hannah was created and designed by series creator and executive producer Kyle Killen after he created and developed the series Lone Star for the Fox network.

== Role in Awake ==
Hannah Britten is the mother of Rex and the wife of Michael. They live in a house in the fictional version of Los Angeles, California in the United States. In the red universe, she is currently a homemaker, while in the green, she is deceased.

== Character ==
=== Creation ===
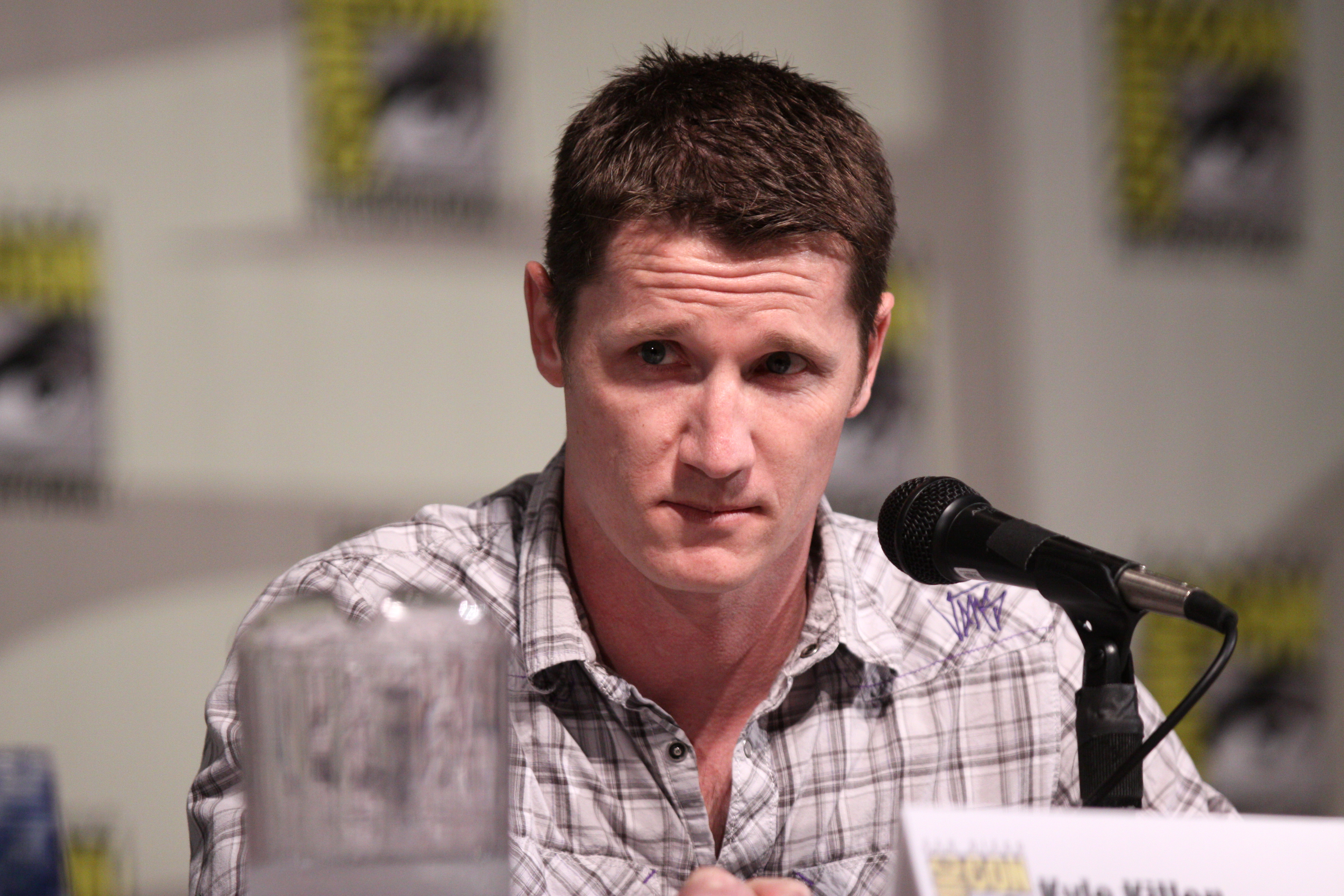
Kyle Killen (pictured) created Hannah after developing Lone Star for the Fox network.

Kyle Killen was conceived of Hannah and the rest of the family and series in 2011 after a report that NBC had purchased the series from the creator Killen, under the original name REM. Killen had been called in to pitch a new drama for NBC, after Jennifer Salke, the president of the entertainment division of NBC, encouraged Killen to conceive a concept for a new drama television series after the cancellation of Lone Star on the Fox network. Within a few weeks, Killen sent a rough draft of the script to his agent Marc Korman. "It was 1 or 2 o'clock in the morning, and I remember I was so freaked out by the script that I went upstairs to our guest bedroom where my wife was sick with the flu and I got into bed with her," recalled Korman. "I called Jen and said: 'I'm telling you, this script is remarkable. I've never read a pilot like this, and for a guy who has never written a procedural show in his life, he's actually making two cases work". Initially, Salke and Korman looked to sell acquisition rights to Fox.

=== Casting ===
In March 2011, Laura Allen obtained the role of the character, alongside five other cast members.

=== Personality ===
Since Rex's death, Hannah has been very emotional, due to this. She began to renovate their home. Though she hardly showed it, she felt great pain and grievance over the death of Rex and was saddened by the thought of his empty room upstairs.

== Reception ==
=== Analysis ===
The character of Hannah has been praised by many television commentators, who Allen felt effectively embodied the characteristics of the lead role. Kelly West of Cinema Blend praised her role, citing Allen's as among the show's "strong performances."
