= Michael Britten =

Character in the American TV series Awake

- Awake character
- First appearance: "Pilot"
- Last appearance: "Turtles All the Way Down"
- Created by: Kyle Killen
- Portrayed by: Jason Isaacs

In-universe information
- Nickname: Mike
- Species: Human
- Gender: Male
- Occupation: Detective at the Los Angeles Police Department
- Spouse: Hannah Britten
- Children: Rex Britten
- Nationality: American

Michael Britten is the fictional main character featured in the American police procedural drama television series Awake. He is portrayed by Jason Isaacs and first appeared, along with the rest of his family, in "Pilot", and last appeared in "Turtles All the Way Down". Michael was created and designed by series creator Kyle Killen after he created and developed the series Lone Star for the Fox network. Killen had been called in to pitch a new drama for NBC after the cancellation of Lone Star.

Michael and his wife Hannah have one child: Rex. After a car crash, Michael begins to live in "two realities", one in which his son Rex survived the crash, when he wears a green wrist band, and another in which his wife Hannah survived the crash, where he wears a red wrist band. He works at the Los Angeles Police Department, alongside Efrem Vega in his "red reality" and Isaiah Freeman in his "green reality". Michael is disorganized and often confused. Despite this, he is adept at solving crimes, as he uses clues from one reality to help him in the other.

Isaacs' portrayal of Michael has been praised by television commentators, who felt that he effectively embodied the characteristics of the lead role. Critics believed that Isaacs' performance deserved an Emmy Award.

== Role in Awake ==
Michael Britten is the husband of Hannah Britten and the father of Rex Britten. After a car crash, he has "two realities", one in which his son Rex survived the crash, where he wears a green wrist band ("green reality"), and another in which his wife Hannah survived the crash, where he wears a red wrist band ("red reality"). He works as a police detective at the fictional version of the Los Angeles Police Department, alongside Efrem Vega in his "red reality" and Isaiah Freeman in his "green reality". He also goes to two separate therapists: Dr. John Lee in the "red reality", and Dr. Judith Evans in the "green reality".

== Character ==
=== Creation ===
Kyle Killen conceived of Michael and the rest of the family and series in 2011 after a report that NBC had purchased the series from the creator Killen, under the original name REM. Killen had been called in to pitch a new drama for NBC, after Jennifer Salke, the president of the entertainment division of NBC, encouraged Killen to conceive a concept for a new drama television series after the cancellation of Lone Star on the Fox network. Within a few weeks, Killen sent a rough draft of the script to his agent Marc Korman. "It was 1 or 2 o'clock in the morning, and I remember I was so freaked out by the script that I went upstairs to our guest bedroom where my wife was sick with the flu and I got into bed with her," recalled Korman. "I called Jen and said: 'I'm telling you, this script is remarkable. I've never read a pilot like this, and for a guy who has never written a procedural show in his life, he's actually making two cases work". Initially, Salke and Korman looked to sell acquisition rights to Fox.

Michael made his debut with the rest of the Britten family on March 1, 2012, in "Pilot" on NBC.

=== Casting ===
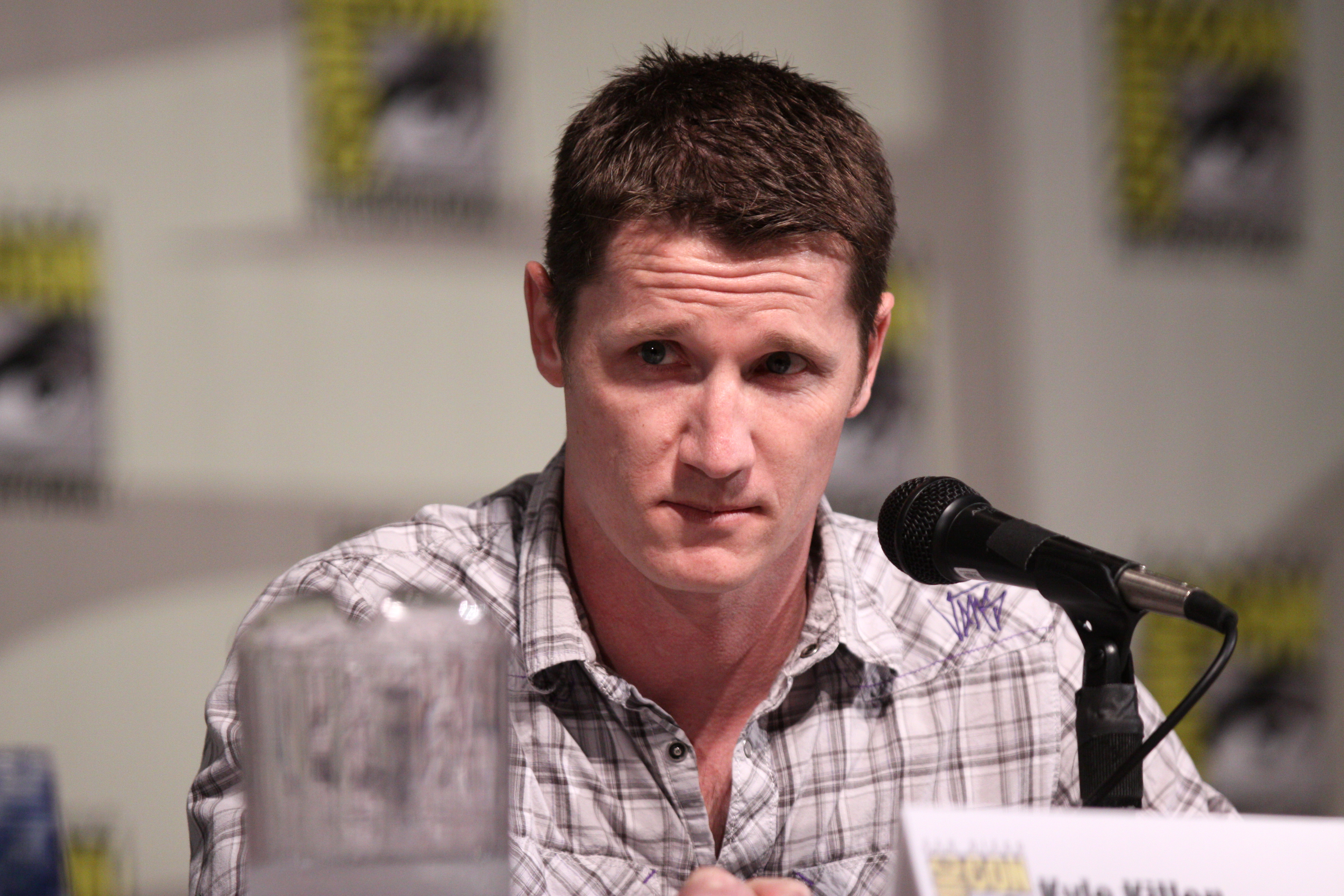
Kyle Killen created Michael after developing Lone Star for the Fox network.

In February 2011, Jason Isaacs obtained the role of the character. Executive producer Howard Gordon summated the premise of the character: "He's a guy who goes to sleep, wakes up, he’s with his wife, goes to sleep, wakes up, and he's with his son. And so — and he's a cop who sees clues and details that crossover from one world to the next, and he uses that insight to solve crimes." Series creator Kyle Killen thought that the premise behind the series would be relatable to audiences, making it easier to broader his fanbase. "I think there were aspects of Lone Star that were more difficult to get a wider, broader audience interested in," he articulated. "[The main character] was somebody that you couldn’t decide if you liked or hated, and I think that Britten's dilemma is something that we’re not only sympathetic for, but somehow we want him to win."

=== Personality ===
Michael develops a routine to help him maintain the illusions of control. He is also disorganized and sometimes exhibits odd behavior, due to living in two realities. Michael gets confused often and suffers from a sleeping disorder. He refuses treatment because he does not wish to accept one reality while rejecting the other, as he wants the opportunity to be with both his wife and son, albeit separately. One example is when Michael does not hand in a permission form for Rex's field trip to the museum. In "Say Hello to My Little Friend", Michael is unable switch to the "green reality" (where Rex is alive), for unknown reason, which Dr. Lee says is progress. Michael finds out he could not switch because it was his subconscious telling him he needed to uncover the truth behind his car crash. He eventually discover Detective Ed Hawkins caused the accident in an attempt to kill Michael.

== Reception ==
=== Analysis ===
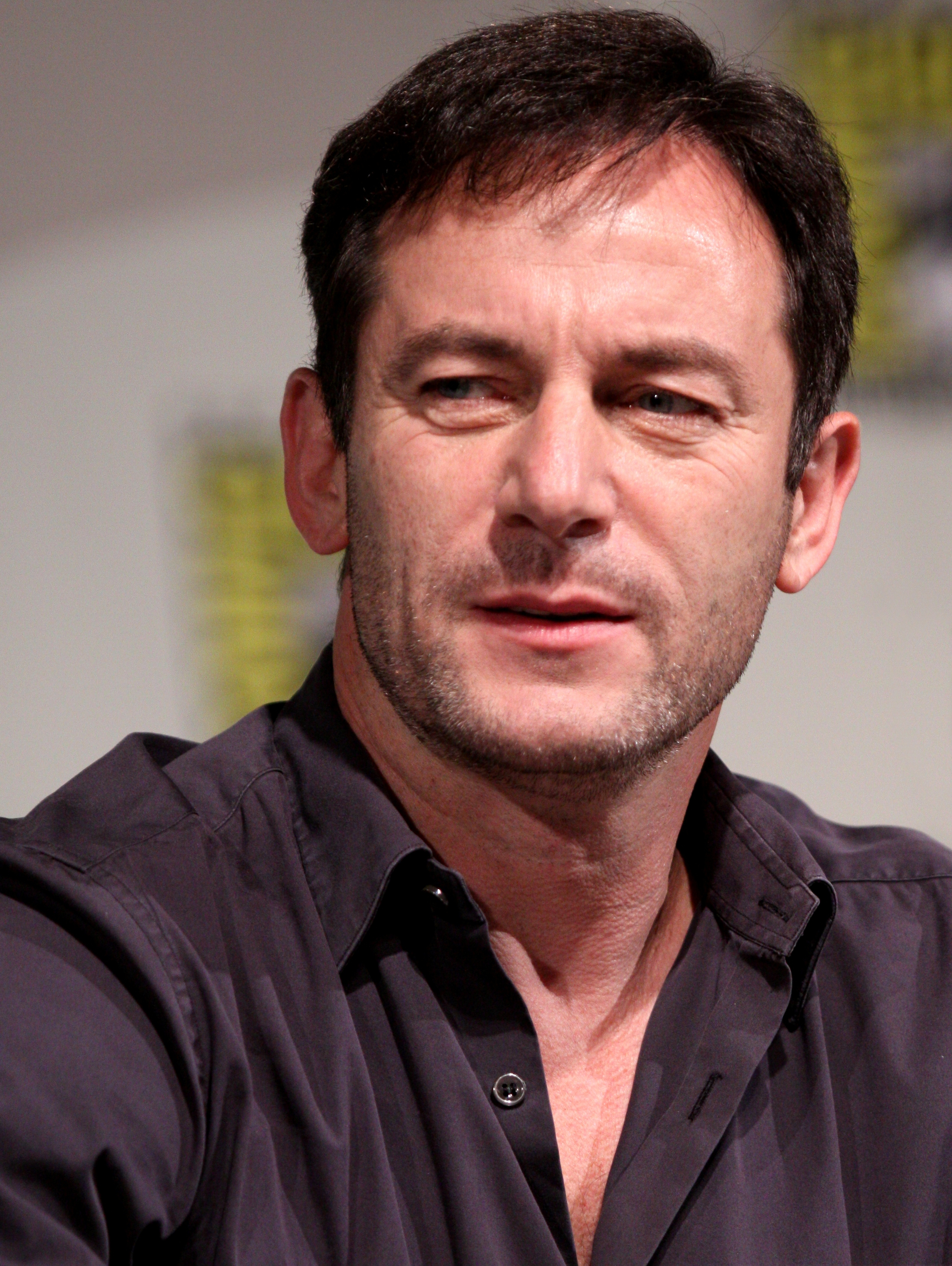
Jason Isaacs's performance as Michael Britten was met with praise from television commentators.

Jason Isaacs's role of Michael Britten has met with praise from most television commentators. Ken Tucker of Entertainment Weekly was keen to Isaacs' acting in the episode. "It helps enormously to have Isaacs playing the lead. This actor knows how to convey a gravity that contrasts well with the series' airy concept, but he avoids becoming heavy and morose."

West summated that the cast "really couldn't be better on this series"; "Isaacs [delivered] a stellar performance as the intelligent detective, and loving father and husband who's just trying to make sense of what's going on and probably not entirely regretful to be experiencing a split reality. Both Wong and Jones are fantastic as the curious therapists. I already wish there were some way we could see these two on screen together." The Paste Magazine, IGN, and TV Fanatic argued that Isaacs's performance deserves an Emmy. Duguay of the Montreal Gazette thought that Isaacs evoked a reservedness and ambiguity that attracted viewers to his character.
