= Kyle Killen =

American television writer and producer

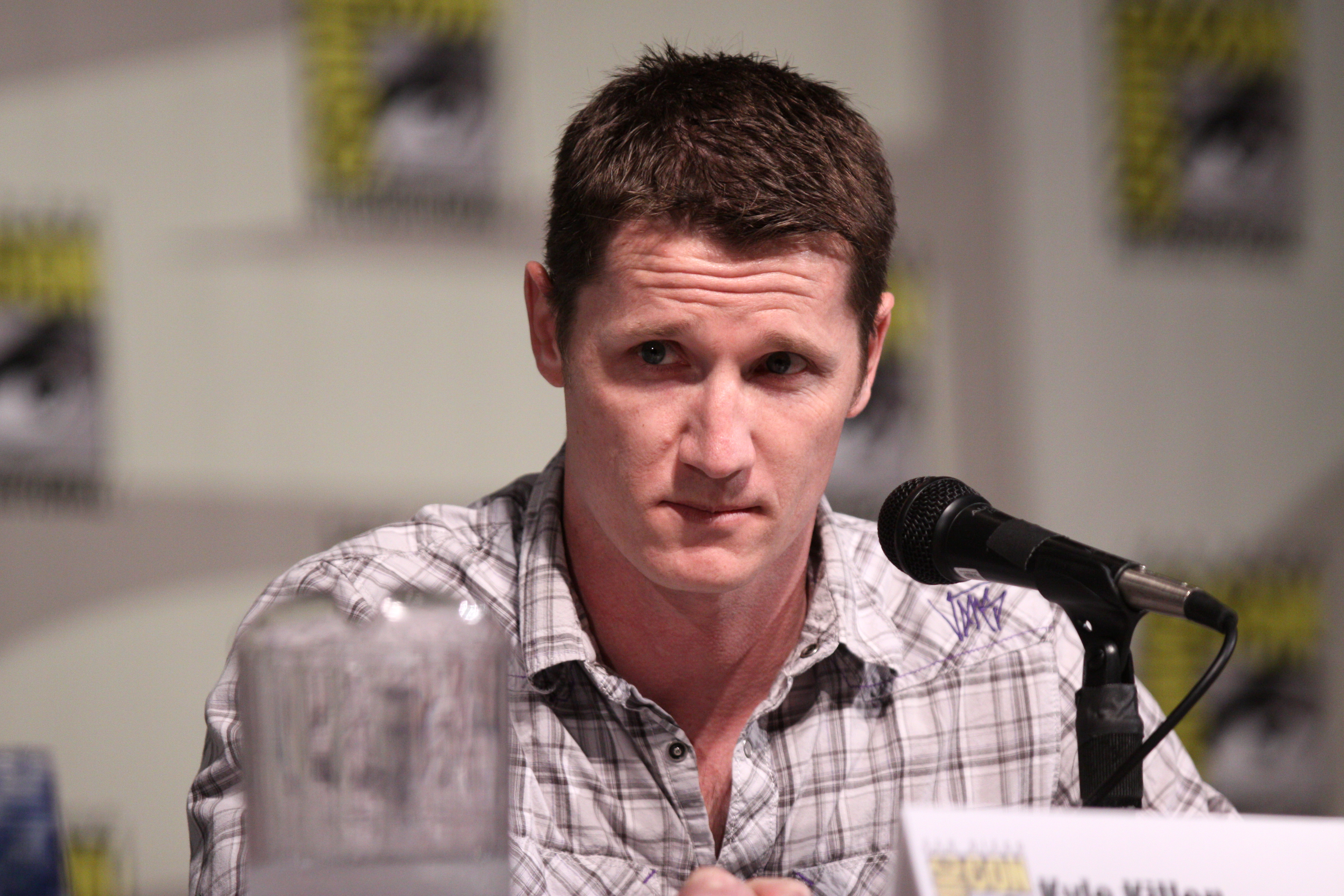
- Killen at 2011 San Diego Comic-Con
- Born: Chicago, Illinois, US
- Occupations: Writer, producer
- Years active: 2010–present
- Known for: Lone Star; Awake
- Children: 3

Kyle Killen is an American television writer and producer. He is best known as the creator and showrunner of the television series Lone Star (2010), Awake (2012), and Mind Games (2014). He also wrote the screenplay of Jodie Foster's The Beaver (2011).

== Early life and education ==
Killen was born in Chicago and moved with his family to Burleson, Texas when he was three. He is a graduate of the film school at the University of Southern California.

== Career ==
Killen is the creator of the short-lived series Lone Star and Awake. He later created the drama series Mind Games for ABC. He also wrote the feature film The Beaver, filmed in 2009 and released in 2011. It was directed by Jodie Foster and starred Jodie Foster and Mel Gibson. A second film written by Killen, 2013's Scenic Route, was directed by Kevin and Michael Goetz. His directorial debut is Mind Games's season finale "As God Is My Witness". In 2016, Killen was hired to revise Jeremy Slater's draft of Netflix's adaptation of Death Note. On June 28, 2018, Killen was hired as showrunner and executive producer of the Halo series, but left the roles in 2021 prior to the start of production.

== Personal life ==
Until starting work on Awake, Killen had been based in Austin, Texas. After graduating from USC and leaving Los Angeles, he wrote short fiction and first-person journalism. While working at what he called "real jobs" (computer support, construction), Killen found it hard to give up screenplay-writing. In a last-ditch effort, he returned to L.A., dressed up as a courier and dropped copies of a script at every agency he could find. Six months later, one of those agents called. "That script probably wasn't deserving of getting produced," he told the trade publication Variety in a 2011 "10 TV Scribes to Watch" feature, "but it got me a teeny, tiny toe in the door." Killen told the Austin American-Statesman in 2010 that "I quit, but I never really quit. I took a lot of horrible, crazy jobs, but I always ended up writing about them or writing things that came out of them." Killen is married to an ER doctor; the couple have three children.

== Filmography ==
=== Film ===
- The Beaver (2011) (written by)
- Scenic Route (2013) (written by)
- Fear Street Part One: 1994 (2021) (story by)

=== Television ===
- Lone Star (2010) (creator, writer, executive producer)
- Awake (2012) (creator, writer, executive producer)
- Mind Games (2014) (creator, writer, director, executive producer)
- Wild Bill (2019) (executive producer)
- Halo (2022–2024) (developer, writer, executive producer)
- Man on Fire (2026) (creator, writer, executive producer)
