= Wallows discography =

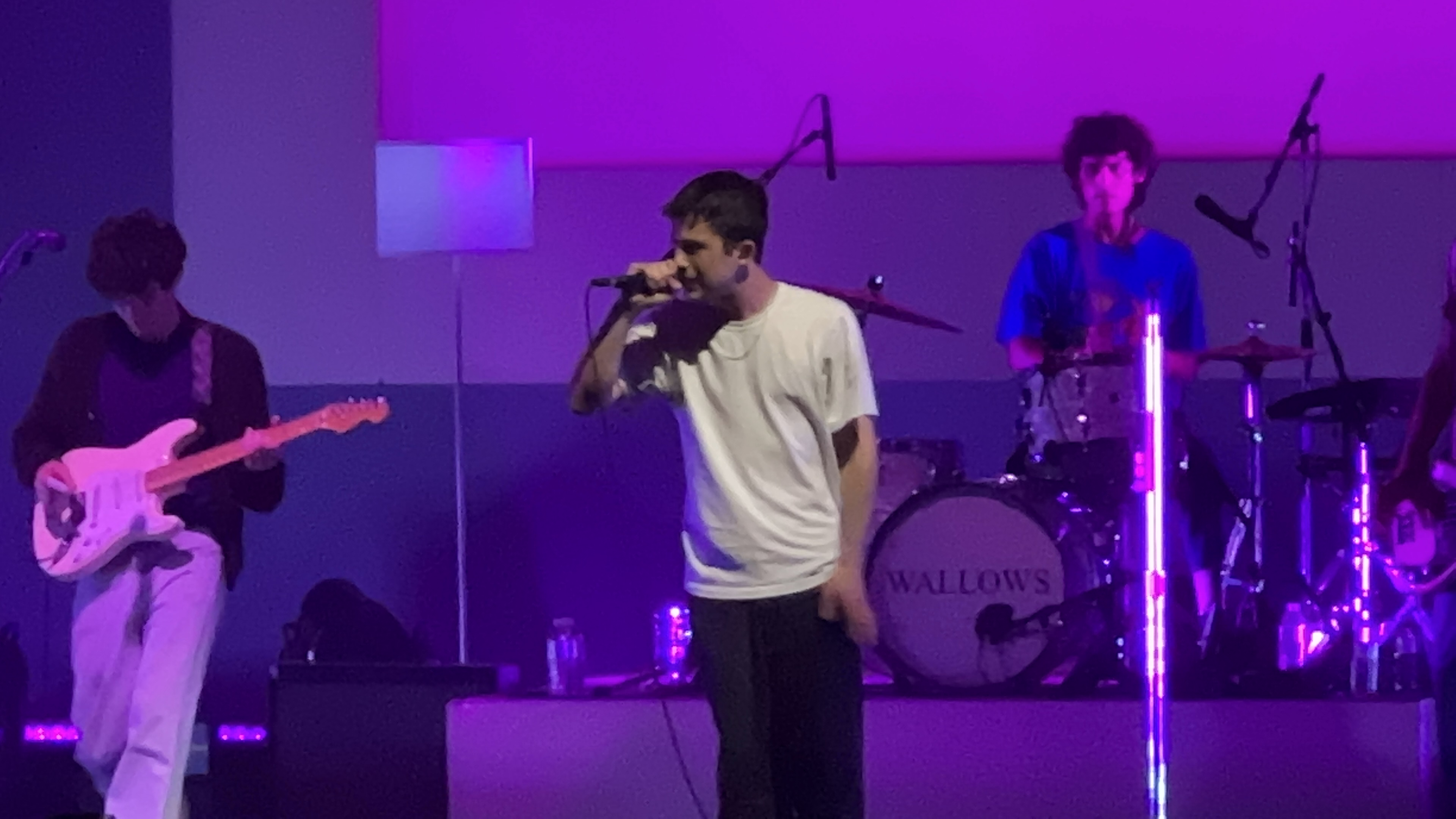
- Wallows performing at Palace Theatre, 2023
- Studio albums: 3
- EPs: 4
- Compilation albums: 2
- Singles: 32
- Music videos: 25

American alternative rock band Wallows have released three studio albums, four extended plays, two compilation albums, 25 music videos and 32 singles. All three of their studio albums debuted at the Billboard 200.

== Albums ==
=== Studio albums ===
List of studio albums with selected album details
Title	Details	Peak chart positions									Certifications
Title	Details	US	US Rock	AUS	FRA Phys.	HUN Phys.	IRE	NED Vinyl	SCO	UK	Certifications
Nothing Happens	Release date: March 22, 2019; Label: Atlantic; Formats: Digital download, CD, cassette, LP	75	13	—	—	—	—	—	—	—	RIAA: Gold
Tell Me That It's Over	Release date: March 25, 2022; Label: Atlantic; Formats: Digital download, CD, cassette, LP	49	7	80	—	—	97	—	9	88	
Model	Release date: May 24, 2024; Label: Atlantic; Formats: Digital download, CD, cassette, LP	28	7	14	134	40	—	14	8	38	
"—" denotes a recording that did not chart or was not released in that territory.

=== Compilation albums ===
Title	Details	Peak chart positions			
Title	Details	US	US Rock	SCO	UK Rec.
Singles Collection 2017—2020	Released: April 23, 2022; Label: Atlantic; Formats: LP, digital download, streaming	108	17	42	33
Nothing Happens: 5th Anniversary Edition	Release date: April 20, 2024; Label: Atlantic; Formats: LP	—	—	—	—
"—" denotes a recording that did not chart or was not released in that territory.

== Extended plays ==
List of EPs with selected album details
Title	Details	Peak chart positions			
Title	Details	US	US Rock	SCO	UK Sales
The Narwhals (as The Narwhals)	Released: October 10, 2014; Label: Independent; Formats: Streaming	—	—	—	—
Spring	Released: April 6, 2018 (US); Label: Atlantic; Formats: Digital download, LP, CD, vinyl record	— (Note: Spring did not enter the Billboard 200 chart, but peaked at number 15 on the US Vinyl Albums chart.)	—	—	—
Remote	Released: October 23, 2020; Label: Atlantic; Formats: Digital download, streaming, LP, CD, vinyl record	129	23	58	88
More	Released: March 28, 2025; Label: Atlantic; Formats: Digital download, streaming, LP, CD, vinyl record	119	25	20	43
"—" denotes a recording that did not chart or was not released in that territory.

== Singles ==
Title	Year	Peak chart positions										Certifications	Album
Title	Year	US Bub.	US Rock	AUS Hit.	BEL	CAN Rock	IRE	JPN Over.	LTU	MEX	UK	Certifications	Album
"Pleaser"	2017	—	—	—	—	—	—	—	—	—	—	RIAA: Gold	Non-album singles
"Sun Tan"	2017	—	—	—	—	—	—	—	—	—	—		Non-album singles
"Uncomfortable"	2017	—	—	—	—	—	—	—	—	—	—		Non-album singles
"Pulling Leaves Off Trees"	2017	—	—	—	—	—	—	—	—	—	—		Non-album singles
"Pictures of Girls"	2018	—	— (Note: "Pictures of Girls" did not enter the Hot Rock & Alternative Songs chart, but peaked at number 39 on the Alternative Airplay chart.)	—	—	—	—	—	—	—	—		Spring
"These Days"	2018	—	—	—	—	—	—	—	—	—	—	RIAA: Gold	Spring
"Underneath the Streetlights in the Winter Outside Your House" (Note: "Underneath the Streetlights in the Winter Outside Your House" appears on the 5th Anniversary Edition of Nothing Happens.)	2018	—	—	—	—	—	—	—	—	—	—		Nothing Happens
"1980s Horror Film"	2018	—	—	—	—	—	—	—	—	—	—		Spring
"1980s Horror Film II"	2018	—	—	—	—	—	—	—	—	—	—		Non-album singles
"Drunk on Halloween"	2018	—	—	—	—	—	—	—	—	—	—		Non-album singles
"Are You Bored Yet?" (featuring Clairo)	2019	12	7	8	193	37	59	—	82	15	65	RIAA: 4× Platinum; ARIA: Platinum; BPI: Platinum; MC: Platinum; ZPAV: Gold	Nothing Happens
"Scrawny"	2019	—	—	—	—	—	—	—	—	—	—	RIAA: Gold	Nothing Happens
"Sidelines"	2019	—	—	—	—	—	—	—	—	—	—		Nothing Happens
"Trust Fall" / "Just Like a Movie" (Note: "Trust Fall" and "Just Like a Movie" appears on the 5th Anniversary Edition of Nothing Happens.)	2019	—	—	—	—	—	—	—	—	—	—		Nothing Happens
"Treacherous Doctor"	2019	—	—	—	—	—	—	—	—	—	—		Nothing Happens
"Remember When"	2020	—	—	—	—	—	—	—	—	—	—	RIAA: Platinum; BPI: Silver	Nothing Happens
"OK" (Note: "OK" appears on the deluxe version of Remote.)	2020	—	28	—	—	—	—	—	—	—	—	RIAA: Gold	Remote
"Nobody Gets Me (Like You)"	2020	—	—	—	—	—	—	—	—	—	—		Remote
"Virtual Aerobics"	2020	—	—	—	—	—	—	—	—	—	—		Remote
"Wish Me Luck"	2020	—	—	—	—	—	—	—	—	—	—		Remote
"Quarterback" (Note: "Quarterback" appears on the deluxe version of Remote.)	2021	—	—	—	—	—	—	—	—	—	—		Remote
"I Don't Want to Talk"	2021	—	—	—	—	—	—	—	—	—	— (Note: "I Don't Want to Talk" did not enter the UK Singles Songs chart, but peaked at number eight on the UK Physical Singles Sales chart.)		Tell Me That It's Over
"Especially You"	2022	—	— (Note: "Especially You" did not enter the Hot Rock & Alternative Songs chart, but peaked at number 30 on the Rock & Alternative Airplay chart.)	—	—	—	—	—	—	—	—		Tell Me That It's Over
"At the End of the Day"	2022	—	—	—	—	—	—	—	—	—	—		Tell Me That It's Over
"Your Apartment"	2024	—	—	—	—	—	—	—	—	—	—		Model
"Calling After Me"	2024	— (Note: "Calling After Me" did not enter the Bubbling Under Hot 100 chart, but peaked at number 36 on the Pop Airplay chart.)	39	—	—	—	—	8	—	—	—	RIAA: Gold	Model
"Bad Dream"	2024	—	—	—	—	—	—	—	—	—	—		Model
"A Warning"	2024	—	—	—	—	—	—	—	—	—	—		Model
"You (Show Me Where My Days Went)"	2024	—	—	—	—	—	—	—	—	—	—		Model
"BAD DREAM"	2024	—	—	—	—	—	—	—	—	—	—		Non-album single
"Your New Favorite Song"	2025	—	—	—	—	—	—	—	—	—	—		More
"Coffin Change"	2025		—	—	—	—	—	—	—	—	—		More
"—" denotes a recording that did not chart or was not released in that territory.

== Music videos ==
Title	Year	Album/EP
"Pleaser"	2017	Non-album singles
"Sun Tan"	2017	Non-album singles
"Pictures of Girls"	2018	Spring EP
"These Days"	2018	Spring EP
"1980s Horror Film"	2018	Spring EP
"Are You Bored Yet?"	2019	Nothing Happens
"Scrawny"	2019	Nothing Happens
"Treacherous Doctor"	2019	Nothing Happens
"Remember When"	2020	Nothing Happens
"OK"	2020	Remote
"Nobody Gets Me (Like You)"	2020	Remote
"Wish Me Luck"	2020	Remote
"Quarterback"	2021	Remote
"I Don't Want to Talk"	2021	Tell Me That It's Over
"Especially You"	2022	Tell Me That It's Over
"At the End of the Day"	2022	Tell Me That It's Over
"Marvelous"	2022	Tell Me That It's Over
"Your Apartment"	2024	Model
"Calling After Me"	2024	Model
"A Warning"	2024	Model
"You (Show Me Where My Days Went)"	2024	Model
"Bad Dream"	2024	Model
"Your New Favorite Song"	2025	More
"Coffin Change"	2025	More
"Hide It Away"	2025	More
