= Braden (surname) =

Braden is a surname.

== Notable people with the surname "Braden" include ==
=== A ===
- Alan Braden (1927–2021), British composer
- Alison Braden (born 1982), Canadian water polo player
- Andrew D. Braden (1916–1993), American professor
- Anne Braden (1924–2006), American activist

=== B ===
- Barbara Braden (1943–2023), American nurse
- Ben Braden (born 1994), American football player
- Bernard Braden (1916–1993), English actor and comedian
- Bill Braden (born 1954), Canadian politician
- Bob Braden (1934–2018), American computer scientist

=== C ===
- Carl Braden (1914–1975), American activist
- Charles S. Braden (1887–1970), American professor
- C. O. Braden (1891–1969), American football coach

=== D ===
- Dallas Braden (born 1983), American baseball player
- David Braden (1917–1980), American football player
- Don Braden (born 1963), American saxophonist

=== G ===
- George Braden (1949–2015), Canadian politician
- George C. Braden (1868–1942), American politician
- Glen Everton Braden (1899–1967), Canadian merchant and politician

=== H ===
- Henry Braden (1944–2013), American lawyer

=== J ===
- John Braden (disambiguation), multiple people

=== K ===
- Kim Braden (born 1949), English actress

=== M ===
- Marv Braden (1938–2022), American football and lacrosse coach
- Miche Braden (born 1953), American singer
- Mrs. Findley Braden (1858–1939), American author, newspaper editor, and elocutionist

=== N ===
- Norah Braden (1901–2001), British painter

=== P ===
- Polly Braden (born 1974), Scottish filmmaker

=== R ===
- Ron Braden (1948–2012), American football and baseball coach

=== S ===
- Samuel Braden (1914–2003), American academic administrator
- Susan G. Braden (born 1948), American judge
- Spruille Braden (1894–1978), American diplomat

=== T ===
- Ted Braden (1928–2007), American soldier
- Thomas H. Braden (1874–1941), American politician
- Tom Braden (1917–2009), American journalist
- Travis Braden (born 1994), American stock car racing driver

=== V ===
- Vic Braden (1929–2014), American tennis player

=== W ===
- William Robert Braden (1858–1922), Canadian politician
- William W. Braden (1837–1897), American politician

== See also ==
- Braden (disambiguation), a disambiguation page for "Braden"
- Braden (given name), a page for people with the given name "Braden"
- Senator Braden (disambiguation), a disambiguation page for Senators surnamed "Braden"
