= Braden (given name) =

- Gender: Unisex (mostly male)

Origin
- Origin: Irish and English
- Meaning: descendant of Bradán

Other names
- Variant forms: Bradan, Bradin, Bradun, Bradyn, Braedan, Braeden, Braedin, Braedon, Braedyn, Breadan, Breaden, Braidan, Braiden, Braidon, Braidun, Braidyn, Braydan, Brayden, Braydin, Braydon, Brayden, or Braydyn

Braden is a given name that is popular in the United States and Canada. Its origin is confined to the British Isles and has two ancient sources.

The English meaning of Braden is "broad valley" or "broad hillside". The name has a strong Saxon origin and is most commonly found in the English county of Sussex. Additionally, there is a Braden (Braydon) Forest in Wiltshire, now mostly cut down, but it was mentioned in the Anglo-Saxon Chronicle as the site of a battle in 904 AD.

The Irish Gaelic surname is Ó Bradáin, meaning "descendant of Bradán". Bradán is an ancient Irish language word meaning "salmon". The bradán feasa is the Salmon of Wisdom in an Irish legend about Fionn MacCool. "Bradán", meaning salmon, is one of the Irish words suggested to be of pre-Indo-European origin.

The name has many alternate spellings, including: Bradan, Bradin, Bradun, Bradyn, Braedan, Braeden, Braedin, Braedon, Braedyn, Breadan, Breaden, Braidan, Braiden, Braidon, Braidun, Braidyn, Braydan, Brayden, Braydin, Braydon, or Braydyn. Some spellings have two d's (e.g. Bradden) but maintain the same pronunciation. It is in use for both boys and girls, but is more common for boys.

== Notable people with the given name "Braden" ==
=== A ===
- Braden Allenby (born 1950), American scientist
- Braeden Anderson (born 1992), American basketball player

=== B ===
- Braden Barty (born 1970), American film producer
- Braden Beck (born 1944), American football player
- Braden Birch (born 1989), Canadian ice hockey player
- Braden Bishop (born 1992), American baseball player
- Braden Bristo (born 1994), American baseball player

=== C ===
- Braeden Caley, Canadian politician
- Braden Calvert (born 1995), Canadian curler
- Braeden Campbell (born 2002), Australian rules footballer
- Braeden Cloutier (born 1974), American soccer coach
- Braeden Cootes (born 2007), Canadian ice hockey player
- Braden Currie (born 1986), New Zealand triathlete

=== D ===
- Braeden Daniels (born 2000), American football player
- Braden Danner (born 1975), American actor
- Braden Davy (born 1992), Scottish politician

=== E ===
- Braden Eves (born 1999), American racing driver

=== F ===
- Braden Fiske (born 2000), American football player

=== G ===
- Braden Gellenthien (born 1986), American archer

=== H ===
- Braden Hamlin-Uele (born 1995), New Zealand rugby league footballer
- Braden Holtby (born 1989), Canadian ice hockey player
- Braden Huff (born 2005), American basketball player
- Braden Hunt, American voice actor

=== K ===
- Braden King (born 1971), American filmmaker

=== L ===
- Braden Layer (born 1989), American football coach
- Braeden Lemasters (born 1996), American actor, musician, and singer
- Braden Looper (born 1974), American baseball player

=== M ===
- Braden Mann (born 1997), American football player
- Braden Mclean (born 1991), Canadian volleyball player
- Braiden McGregor (born 2001), American football player
- Braden Montgomery (born 2003), American baseball player
- Braeden Moskowy (born 1990), Canadian curler

=== O ===
- Braeden Ogle (born 1997), American baseball player

=== P ===
- Braden Peters, (born 2005), better known as Clavicular, American influencer

=== S ===
- Braden Schneider (born 2001), Canadian ice hockey player
- Braden Schram (born 1992), Canadian football player
- Braden Shewmake (born 1997), American baseball player
- Braden Shipley (born 1992), American baseball player
- Braden Smith (born 1996), American football player
- Braden Smith (basketball) (born 2003), American basketball player
- Braeden Sorbo (born 2001), American actor
- Braden Stewart (born 1996), New Zealand rugby union footballer
- Bradyn Swinson, American football player

=== T ===
- Braden Thornberry (born 1997), American golfer
- Braeden Troyer (born 1993), American soccer player

=== W ===
- Braden Webb (born 1995), American baseball player
- Braden Wilson (born 1989), American football player

== See also ==
- Braden (disambiguation), a disambiguation page for "Braden"
- Braden (surname), a page for people with the surname "Braden"
