= Alexander and the Terrible, Horrible, No Good, Very Bad Day (soundtrack) =

2014 film soundtrack album

Alexander and the Terrible, Horrible, No Good, Very Bad Day (Music from the Motion Picture)

Soundtrack album / EP by Christophe Beck
- Released: October 7, 2014
- Recorded: 2014
- Genre: Film soundtrack
- Length: 16:53
- Label: Walt Disney

Alexander and the Terrible, Horrible, No Good, Very Bad Day (Music from the Motion Picture) is the soundtrack extended play to the 2014 film Alexander and the Terrible, Horrible, No Good, Very Bad Day directed by Miguel Arteta. The soundtrack was released on October 7, 2014, through Walt Disney Records and featured contributions from the Vamps, Kerris and Justine Dorsey, the Narwhals, Charles William, and IDK and the Whatevs, along with a three-minute suite from the score composed by Christophe Beck.

== Background ==
On April 1, 2014, Christophe Beck was hired to score the film. Miguel Arteta said that "Beck loved the honesty in the film with regards to raising a family which can get hectic at times. He added a genuine life beat to the whole film" and "When the troubles for the family start, you can almost hear Chris' score going 'Oh noooo!' It feels like honest mayhem in an incredibly fun way."

The British rock band the Vamps contributed for the song "Hurricane". Arteta said that the bands' optimism had drew him to the group, further adding that their energy had communicated the message of people overcoming their bad days becoming stronger and better. A music video for the song was filmed with the band along with a cameo by actress Bella Thorne, who plays Celia Rodriguez. Dylan Minnette, who plays Anthony Cooper, had wrote the song "Surf Surf Down" with Braeden Lemasters and performed by the Narwhals. Kerris Dorsey, who played Emily Cooper, had performed the song "Best Worst Day Ever" with her sister Justine Dorsey. Arteta chose them to perform the song, as they liked their voices and had them play on the studio which prompted them to contribute to the film's soundtrack, and was impressed with their contribution.

== Release ==
The soundtrack album was released through Walt Disney Records on October 7, 2014.

== Reception ==
Marshal Knight of Laughing Place considered the soundtrack to be enjoyable. Justin Chang of Variety wrote "the soundtrack includes an original tune, “Best Worst Day Ever” (written and performed by Dorsey and her singer-songwriter sister, Justine), happily supplanting the more obvious choice of Daniel Powter’s “Bad Day.”" Blake Shipley from Renowned for Sound considered the soundtrack to be "full-on, wholly immersive", while Blake Goble of Consequence and Jordan Hoffman from The Guardian called the music "occasional" and "rambunctious".

== Track listing ==
No.	Title	Artist	Length
1.	"Hurricane"	The Vamps	3:17
2.	"Best Worst Day Ever"	Kerris and Justine Dorsey	3:35
3.	"We Are the Ones (Own the World)"	Charles William	3:08
4.	"Surf Surf Don't Drown"	The Narwhals	3:27
5.	"Perfect World"	IDK and the Whatevs	3:06
6.	"Suite from Alexander and the Terrible, Horrible, No Good, Very Bad Day"	Christophe Beck	3:20
Total length:			19:53

== Charts ==
Chart (2014)	Peak position
UK Soundtrack Albums (OCC)	48
US Top Soundtracks (Billboard)	25
