= Are You Bored Yet? =

- Remixes single cover

Single by Wallows featuring Clairo

from the album Nothing Happens
- Written: 2018
- Released: February 1, 2019
- Genre: Indie rock
- Length: 2:58
- Label: Atlantic
- Songwriters: Dylan Minnette; Braeden Lemasters; Cole Preston; Claire Cottrill
- Producer: John Congleton

Wallows featuring Clairo singles chronology
"Drunk on Halloween" (2018)	"Are You Bored Yet?" (2019)	"Scrawny" (2019)

Music video
- "Are You Bored Yet?" on YouTube

"Are You Bored Yet?" is a song by American alternative rock band Wallows featuring American singer-songwriter Clairo, released through Atlantic Records on February 1, 2019, as the lead single from their debut album Nothing Happens. The song peaked at number 2 on the Billboard American Alternative Airplay chart and has since reached quadruple-platinum certification by the RIAA.

== Background ==
Wallows began to work on their debut studio album, Nothing Happens, following the release of their EP Spring.

The band was inspired to include a female feature on the track after completing a demo version of the single, which used pitched-up vocals from member Dylan Minnette. American singer-songwriter Clairo, whom the band knew through mutual friends, was contacted by Wallows to record in their studio to serve as the female feature, which she accepted.

== Composition ==
Dylan Minnette, the group's frontman, described the track as being from "the perspective of someone in a relationship who can see that it's coming to a definite end", whereas the verse performed by Clairo is from the perspective of "the other side of the relationship" and is more optimistic. Band member Cole Preston described the track as "nice, digestible, [and] easy-to-listen-to" in comparison to the other songs from the album.

Musically, "Are You Bored Yet?" is an indie rock song with elements of bedroom pop, with "chiming piano and delicate guitar riffs." Carrine Hen of Melodic Magazine wrote that the song "has a very soft, upbeat sound driven by light synth and piano that will make you feel nostalgic."

== Remixes ==
On June 14, 2019, Wallows released two remixes of "Are You Bored Yet?" in collaboration with Sachi of indie-rock band Joy Again and Big Data. A third remix, produced by British musician Mura Masa, was released on August 28, 2020. Austin Evanson of Dancing Astronaut described the new electronic arrangement as a "different, yet altogether mellow new environment" when compared to the original.

== Music video ==
The official music video, directed by Drew Kirsch, premiered alongside the release of the single on February 1, 2019. The video depicts the band members and Clairo performing at a karaoke bar, with members of the audience lip-syncing along to the lyrics of the song and features a cameo from actor Noah Centineo as a bartender. The music video has more than 91 million views as of January 2026, with 1.6 million likes.

== Personnel ==
Adapted from Spotify.

Wallows

- Dylan Minnette - writing, vocals, guitar, keyboard
- Cole Preston - writing, drums, guitar, keyboard, synth
- Braeden Lemasters - writing, backing vocals, guitar

Claire Cottrill - vocals

== Charts ==
=== Weekly charts ===
Weekly chart performance for "Are You Bored Yet?"
Chart (2020)	Peak position
Belgium (Ultratip Bubbling Under Flanders)	93
Canada Rock (Billboard)	37
Ireland (IRMA)	59
Lithuania (AGATA)	82
Mexico Ingles Airplay (Billboard)	15
UK Singles (Official Charts)	65
US Bubbling Under Hot 100 (Billboard)	12
US Hot Rock & Alternative Songs (Billboard)	7
US Rock & Alternative Airplay (Billboard)	3

=== Year-end charts ===
Year-end chart performance for "Are You Bored Yet?"
Chart (2020)	Position
US Hot Rock & Alternative Songs (Billboard)	15
US Rock Airplay (Billboard)	39

== Certifications ==
Certifications for "Are You Bored Yet?"
Region	Certification	Certified units/sales
Australia (ARIA)	Platinum	70,000^{‡}
Austria (IFPI Austria)	Gold	15,000^{‡}
Canada (Music Canada)	3× Platinum	240,000^{‡}
France (SNEP)	Gold	100,000^{‡}
New Zealand (RMNZ)	2× Platinum	60,000^{‡}
Poland (ZPAV)	Gold	10,000^{‡}
Portugal (AFP)	Gold	5,000^{‡}
Spain (Promusicae)	Gold	30,000^{‡}
Switzerland (IFPI Switzerland)	Gold	10,000^{‡}
United Kingdom (BPI)	Platinum	600,000^{‡}
United States (RIAA)	4× Platinum	4,000,000^{‡}
^{‡} Sales+streaming figures based on certification alone.

== Release history ==
Release dates and formats for "Are You Bored Yet?"
Region	Date	Format(s)	Label	Ref.
Various	February 1, 2019	Digital download; streaming	Atlantic	
Various	April 13, 2019	Vinyl	Atlantic	
