= Brayden =

Brayden is a given name that is often referred to as Irish or Scottish. Alternative spellings include Braeden, Braden, Braydan, Braydon, Breadan, Brandon and Bradon.

== Notable people with the given name "Brayden" ==
- Brayden Cook (born 2002), Australian rules footballer
- Brayden Davidson (born 1997), Australian track and field athlete
- Brayden Holt, recurring character in Wentworth Prison
- Brayden Irwin (born 1987), Canadian ice hockey player
- Brayden Lyle (born 1973), Australian rules footballer
- Brayden "Bray" Lynch (born 2004), American football player
- Brayden Maynard (born 1996), Australian rules footballer
- Brayden McNabb (born 1991), Canadian ice hockey player
- Brayden Mitchell (born 1989), New Zealand rugby union footballer
- Brayden Narveson (born 1999), American football player
- Brayden Point (born 1996), Canadian ice hockey player
- Brayden Schenn (born 1991), Canadian ice hockey player
- Brayden Schnur (born 1995), Canadian tennis player
- Brayden Taylor (born 2002), American baseball player
- Brayden Thomas (born 1998), American football player
- Brayden Wiliame (born 1992), Australian rugby league footballer
- Brayden Willis (born 1999), American football player
- Brayden Gamble (Born 2012) Chaos creator

== See also ==
- Braden (disambiguation)
- Bryden
