= Reg E. Cathey =

American actor (1958–2018)

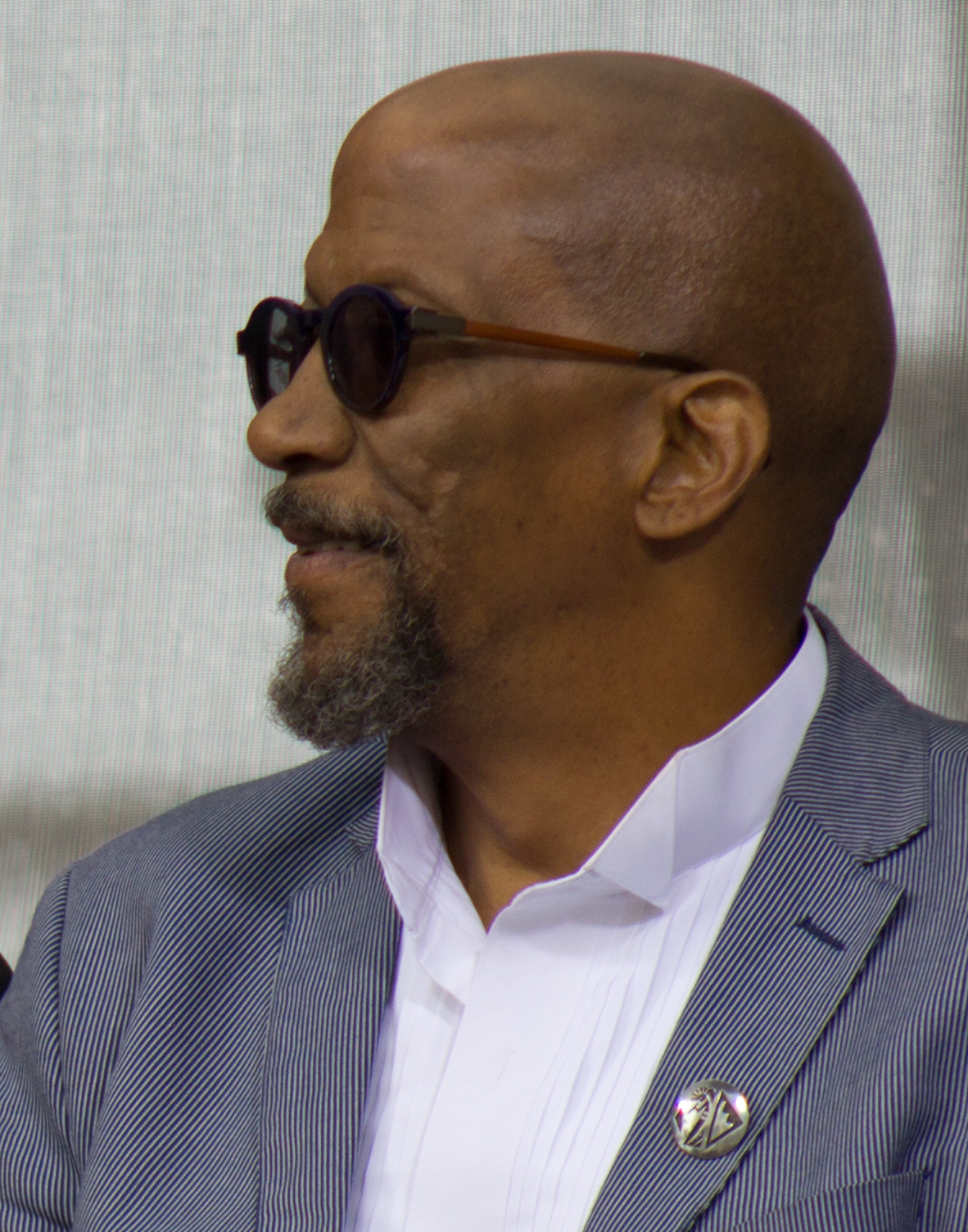
- Cathey in 2016
- Born: Reginald Eurias Cathey; August 18, 1958; Huntsville, Alabama, U.S.
- Died: February 9, 2018 (aged 59); New York City, U.S.
- Education: University of Michigan (BFA); Yale University (MFA)
- Occupation: Actor
- Years active: 1984–2018

Reginald Eurias Cathey (August 18, 1958 – February 9, 2018) was an American character actor. He was best known for various roles on the children's math show Square One Television, as well as Norman Wilson in The Wire, Martin Querns in Oz, and Freddy Hayes in House of Cards. The latter garnered him three consecutive Emmy Award nominations for Outstanding Guest Actor in a Drama Series, including a win in 2015.

== Early life ==
Cathey was born on August 18, 1958, in Huntsville, Alabama, to Red Cathey, an Army colonel who fought in World War II, the Korean War and the Vietnam War, and his wife, who was a DOD worker and an educator. He had a sister, Donza. He spent his childhood with his family on a farm in rural West Germany before returning to Alabama at the age of 14. His interest in theater began at age 9, after attending a United Service Organization show in West Germany. Cathey graduated from J.O. Johnson High School, where he acted in plays such as To Kill a Mockingbird. He subsequently studied theatre at the University of Michigan and the Yale School of Drama.

== Career ==
Cathey's breakout role was on Children's Television Workshop's Square One Television, a sketch comedy-oriented children's TV series about mathematics. The program aired on PBS from 1987 to 1992. Cathey later referred to himself and the cast as the "Not Ready for Prime-Time Mathematicians".

This was followed by guest roles in such series as Star Trek: The Next Generation and Homicide: Life on the Street. In 1994, he appeared in The Mask as Freeze, the main antagonist's friend and bodyguard who gets inadvertently killed by the title character. He also appeared in 1995's Se7en as the coroner. He played the villain Dirty Dee in the cult comedy film Pootie Tang and had a regular role on the HBO series The Wire as Norman Wilson during the fourth and fifth seasons. He also worked with The Wire creator David Simon on the Emmy Award-winning miniseries The Corner; Cathey played a drug addict known as Scalio. He had a recurring role on the HBO prison drama Oz as unit manager Martin Querns. In the film Tank Girl, he played the role of Deetee. He narrated Aftermath: Population Zero, a National Geographic Channel special which imagines what Earth might be like if humanity no longer existed. He played the homeless man Al, murdered by Patrick Bateman, in the film American Psycho. He narrated TLC's Wonders of Weather, a TV series. On Between the Lions, he played King Ray in the story of "Rumpelstiltskin" in the episode, "Hay Day".

In 2009, Cathey performed in The People Speak, a documentary feature film that uses dramatic and musical performances of the letters, diaries, and speeches of everyday Americans, based on historian Howard Zinn's A People's History of the United States.

In Fall 2009, Cathey played the role of Ellis Boyd "Red" Redding in a theatrical production of The Shawshank Redemption at Wyndham's Theatre, London. He has made two guest appearances on Law & Order: Special Victims Unit, as an undercover police officer involved with animal smuggling (episode: "Wildlife") and later as a high-priced defense attorney to a hooker (episode: "Rhodium Nights"). He also made a guest appearance on Law & Order: Criminal Intent in the episode "Anti-Thesis" as a college professor suspected of murder. He also played boxing promoter Barry K. Word on the FX series Lights Out.

In 2013, Cathey began a recurring role as Freddy Hayes, the owner of Freddy's BBQ, in Netflix's original series House of Cards, as well as on Grimm, in the recurring role of Baron Samedi. His portrayal of Hayes in the second, third, and fourth seasons of House of Cards earned three Emmy nominations and one win for Outstanding Guest Actor in a Drama Series.

Cathey had expressed a wish to appear in the Irish soap opera Fair City.

Cathey co-starred in Josh Trank's Fantastic Four (2015), as Dr. Franklin Storm, the father of The Invisible Woman and The Human Torch. He also played the county sheriff in the city of Rome, WV, in the Cinemax series Outcast. One of Cathey's final TV roles was portraying James Lucas in the Netflix series Marvel's Luke Cage.

== Death ==
Cathey died at his home in New York City on February 9, 2018, at the age of 59. He was reported to have had lung cancer. He was cremated, and his ashes were spread in New York City.

== Filmography ==
=== Film ===
Year	Title	Role	Notes
1988	Funny Farm	Reporter #2	
1988	Crossing Delancey	Cab Driver	
1988	Ich und Er	Waiter	
1989	Penn & Teller Get Killed	Fan's Friend	
1989	Born on the Fourth of July	Speaker	
1990	Loose Cannons	Willie	
1990	Quick Change	Sound Analyst	
1990	Astonished	Wayne	
1991	What About Bob?	Howie Katrell	
1994	Clean Slate	1st Cop	
1994	The Mask	Freeze	Credited as Reginald E. Cathey
1994	Clear and Present Danger	Sergeant-Major	
1994	Airheads	Marcus	
1994	The Hard Truth	Shotgun cop	
1995	Napoleon	Frog	Voice, English version
1995	Tank Girl	Deetee	
1995	Se7en	Dr. Santiago	
1997	Ill Gotten Gains	Nassor	
2000	American Psycho	Homeless Man	
2001	Pootie Tang	Dirty Dee	
2003	Head of State	Officer Waters	
2003	A Good Night to Die	Avi	
2003	S.W.A.T.	Lt. Greg Velasquez	
2004	The Machinist	Jones	
2004	Everyday People	Akbar	
2004	Men Without Jobs	Mr. Morgan	
2004	The Cookout	Frank Washington	
2006	508 Nelson	Frank Harmon	
2008	20 Years After	Samuel	
2008	Patsy	Dr. Joshua	
2011	My Last Day Without You	Pastor Johnson	
2012	Arbitrage	Earl Monroe	
2012	The Normals	Rodney	
2012	Sampling	Leonard	Short
2014	Two Men in Town	Supervisor Jones	
2014	Alex of Venice	Walt	
2014	St. Vincent	Gus	
2015	Nasty Baby	The Bishop	
2015	Sweet Kandy	Curtis Coleson	
2015	Fantastic Four	Dr. Franklin Storm	
2016	Hands of Stone	Don King	
2017	Flock of Four	Pope Dixon	
2018	Tyrel	Reggie	

=== Television ===
Year	Title	Role	Notes
1984	A Doctor's Story	Richie	Television movie
1987	Spenser: For Hire	Shepard	Episode: "The Man Who Wasn't There"
1987–1992	Square One Television	Various	240 episodes
1988–1989	Sesame Street	Blue Bird (voice only)	2 episodes
1990	Great Performances	Guildenstern	Episode: "Hamlet"
1991	Eyes of a Witness	Prosecutor	Television movie
1992	Fool's Fire	Minister Gunther	Television movie
1993	And the Band Played On	Staff doctor #2	Television movie
1993	Star Trek: The Next Generation	Morag	Episode: "Aquiel"
1994	Roc	Fred	Episode: "The Concert"
1995	Tyson	Attorney Winston	Television movie
1996	ER	IAD Investigator David Haskell	Episode: "Take These Broken Wings"
1997–1998	Arli$$	Alvin Epps	3 episodes
1998	Homicide: Life on the Street	Bernard Weeks	Episode: "Full Court Press"
2000	The Corner	Scalio	6 episodes
2000	Homicide: The Movie	Bernard Weeks	Television movie
2000–2003	Oz	Martin Querns	8 episodes
2001	Boycott	E.D. Nixon	Television movie
2002	Law & Order: Criminal Intent	Professor Roland Sanders	Episode: "Anti-Thesis"
2002	Between the Lions	Himself	Episode: "Hay Day"
2004	Law & Order	Gerald	Episode: "Darwinian"
2004	The Jury	Mr. Grove	Episode: "Mail Order Mystery"
2005	Third Watch	Jaime Castro	Episode: "Welcome Home"
2006–2008	The Wire	Norman Wilson	23 episodes
2008	Law & Order: Special Victims Unit	Victor Tybor	Episode: "Wildlife"
2009	Une aventure New-Yorkaise	Marcus	Television movie
2010	30 Rock	Rutherford Rice	Episode: "Let's Stay Together"
2010	Inside the Milky Way	Narrator	Documentary Film
2011	Earth: Making of a Planet	Narrator	Documentary Film
2011	Lights Out	Barry K. Word	12 episodes
2012	Person of Interest	Davidson	Episode: "Blue Code"
2012–2013	Law & Order: Special Victims Unit	Barry Querns	4 episodes
2013	Grimm	The Baron / Baron Samedi	3 episodes
2013–2016	House of Cards	Freddy Hayes	15 episodes Primetime Emmy Award for Outstanding Guest Actor in a Drama Series (2015); Nominated—Primetime Emmy Award for Outstanding Guest Actor in a Drama Series (2014, 2016)
2014	Banshee Origins	Det. Julius Bonner	3 episodes
2014	Banshee	Det. Julius Bonner	2 episodes
2014	The Divide	Uncle Bobby	5 episodes
2015	The Good Wife	Judge Aaron Coleman	Episode: "The Deconstruction"
2015	Neon Joe, Werewolf Hunter	Dad	2 episodes
2015	Masters of the Clock: The Legend of Martinsville	Narrator	Television movie
2016	The Blacklist	The Caretaker	Episode: "The Caretaker (No. 78)"
2016	Horace and Pete	Harold	2 episodes
2016	Inside Amy Schumer	Congressman #2	Episode: "The World's Most Interesting Woman in the World"
2016	Inside Amy Schumer	Adviser	Episode: "Madame President"
2016–2017	Outcast	Chief Byron Giles	20 episodes
2017	The Immortal Life of Henrietta Lacks	Zakariyya Lacks	Television movie
2018	Elementary	Mr. Clay	Episode: "Our Time Is Up"; posthumous release
2018	Luke Cage	James Lucas	7 episodes; posthumous release
2018	Rapunzel's Tangled Adventure	Captain Quaid	Voice, 2 episodes; posthumous release

=== Stage ===
Year	Title	Role	Notes
1980	As You Like It	Silvius	Williamstown Theatre Festival
1980	Pilk's Madhouse	Tramp Two/Dr. Phillimon/Arhtur/Robert/Doctor/Tinker Keogh	Williamstown Theatre Festival
1980	Who's Life is it Anyway?	John	Williamstown Theatre Festival
1983	Richard III	Sir William Brandon	The Public Theater, Off-Broadway
1985	Measure for Measure	Gentleman No. 1	The Public Theater, Off-Broadway
1986	The Merchant of Venice	Salerio	Classic Stage Company, Off-Broadway
1988	The Show Off	Mr. Gill	Williamstown Theatre Festival
1989	In A Pig's Valise	The Bop Op	Second Stage Theater, Off-Broadway
1989	Bad Penny	Man	Lake in Central Park
1990	Crowbar	Mr. Rioso	Victory Theatre, Off-Broadway
1990	Hamlet	Guildenstern	The Public Theater, Off-Broadway
1990	Macbeth	Various	The Public Theater, Off-Broadway
1997	The Changeling	Lollio	Theatre for a New Audience, Off-Broadway
1999	The Taming of the Shrew	Hortensio	Shakespeare in the Park, Off-Broadway
2000	The Green Bird	Brighella	Cort Theatre, Broadway
2001	The Winter's Tale	Polixenes	Williamstown Theatre Festival
2002	Talk	Crito	The Foundry Theatre, Off-Broadway
2004	White Chocolate	Brandon Beale	Century Center for the Performing Arts, Off-Broadway
2004	Henry IV	Falstaff	California Shakespeare Theater
2006	Blue Door	Lewis	Playwrights Horizons, Off-Broadway
2009	Three Sisters	Chebutykin	Classical Theatre of Harlem
2011	Timon of Athens	Alcibiades	Shakespeare Lab, Off-Broadway
2017	Endgame	Clov	Long Wharf Theatre

=== Video games ===
Year	Title	Voice role	Notes
1997	D.A. Pursuit of Justice	Courtwatcher	
2013	Star Wars: The Old Republic – Rise of the Hutt Cartel	Additional Voices	
