= John Braden =

John Braden may refer to:

- John Braden (producer) (1949–2004), American writer, producer and director in film and television
- John Braden (politician) (1841–1926), English-born political figure in British Columbia
- John Braden (musician) (1946–1987), American musician, writer and producer of children's records
