= Tell Me That It's Over =

Studio album by Wallows
- Released: March 25, 2022
- Recorded: 2021
- Length: 33:58
- Label: Atlantic
- Producer: Ariel Rechtshaid

Wallows chronology
Remote (2020)	Tell Me That It's Over (2022)	Model (2024)

Singles from Tell Me That It's Over
- 1. "I Don't Want to Talk" Released: September 30, 2021; 2. "Especially You" Released: February 3, 2022; 3. "At the End of the Day" Released: March 4, 2022

Tell Me That It's Over is the second studio album by American indie rock band Wallows, released on March 25, 2022, through Atlantic Records. The album followed their 2020 extended play, Remote.

== Background ==
On September 30, 2021, Wallows released the lead single, "I Don't Want to Talk", along with a music video and North American tour dates. On December 5, 2021, Wallows announced the album title and teased four snippets of audio tracks on a new website. The album's second single, "Especially You", and its music video were released on February 3, 2022. The track was released along with international tour dates, a tracklist, cover, and release date for Tell Me That It's Over. The third single, "At the End of the Day", was released on March 4, 2022. Along with it came a music video filmed in Las Vegas, Nevada. A music video for the fifth track on the album, "Marvelous", was released alongside the album on March 25, 2022. Filmmaker and photographer Jason Lester directed each music video released for Tell Me That It's Over.

Tell Me That It's Over was produced by band members Braeden Lemasters, Cole Preston, and Dylan Minnette, along with multi-Grammy winner Ariel Rechtshaid. Lemasters described the album to "American Songwriter" as “a result of the relationships we’ve had, and love, and being more of an adult, and what that means and the seriousness of it, versus the loss of innocence entering adulthood of our first album.”

Unlike with their debut album Nothing Happens, Tell Me That It’s Over came together over time with a return to some 2018 demos and some newer material. Wallows spent most of 2021 making the album.

The sixth track on the album, "Permanent Price", features vocals from Lydia Night, lead vocalist for The Regrettes and, at the time, long-time girlfriend of Dylan Minnette.

== Release and promotion ==
Tell Me That It's Over was released through Atlantic Records on March 25, 2022, in vinyl, CD, digital streaming and download formats. To celebrate the album release, Wallows did a Q&A and a live performance at Rough Trade Records in New York City on March 26. On March 27, the band played Music Hall of Williamsburg. The performance was streamed live on Amazon Music's Twitch Channel. Finally, on March 30, Wallows performed "Marvelous" on Jimmy Kimmel Live! in support of their second album. Wallows announced the Tell Me That It's Over Tour in 2021. On April 1, 2022, Wallows played the first show of the tour at the Paramount Theatre in Seattle, WA. The band played 10 sold-out shows before taking a brief break. In that break, they performed at Coachella Valley Music and Arts Festival in Indio, California for the second time. Wallows resumed their tour on May 15 in Austin, TX. The band will be touring throughout 2022 and into 2023, with stops at festivals including Bonnaroo and Arts Music Festival, Lollapalooza, Reading Festival, and Leeds Festival. Special guests Spill Tab, Jordana, May-A, and Hatchie will be joining them on the road.

== Track listing ==
All tracks are produced by Ariel Rechtshaid, except where noted.

Tell Me That It's Over track listing
No.	Title	Writer(s)	Producer(s)	Length
1.	"Hard to Believe"	Braeden Lemasters; Dylan Minnette; Cole Preston		3:40
2.	"I Don't Want to Talk"	Lemasters; Minnette; Preston; Rechtshaid; Cole Marsden Greif-Neill	Rechtshaid; Preston^{[a]}	3:43
3.	"Especially You"	Lemasters; Minnette; Preston; Rechtshaid; John DeBold; Sachi DiSerafino		3:01
4.	"At the End of the Day"	Lemasters; Minnette; Preston; Sarah Aarons; Nate Mercereau		3:53
5.	"Marvelous"	Lemasters; Minnette; Preston		2:22
6.	"Permanent Price"	Lemasters; Minnette; Preston; John Congleton		3:06
7.	"Missing Out"	Lemasters; Minnette; Preston; DeBold	Rechtshaid; DeBold^{[a]}	3:16
8.	"Hurts Me"	Lemasters; Minnette; Preston; Rechtshaid		2:58
9.	"That's What I Get"	Lemasters; Minnette; Preston; DeBold; DiSerafino		3:51
10.	"Guitar Romantic Search Adventure"	Lemasters; Minnette; Preston; Rechtshaid		4:03
Total length:				33:58

Notes

- ^{^[a]} indicates an additional producer

== Personnel ==
Wallows

- Dylan Minnette – vocals (1–6, 8–10), bass guitar (1, 3, 5, 7), whistle (1, 2), electric guitar (8), art direction, photography
- Braeden Lemasters – electric guitar (1–3, 5–8), vocals (2–5, 7–9), acoustic guitar (4, 6, 10), piano (5, 10), bass guitar (7), art direction
- Cole Preston – drums, piano (1, 10), electric guitar (2, 5–7, 10), vocals (2, 3, 7); drum programming, harmonica (2); synthesizer (4, 5), art direction

Additional musicians

- Ariel Rechtshaid – bass synthesizer (1, 3, 10), drum programming (1–4, 7, 9), string arrangement (1, 6, 7, 9), synthesizer (1–5, 7–10), bass guitar (2, 4–6, 8–10), percussion (2, 3, 5–7), harmonica (3), Rhodes solo (5), electric guitar (6–8), piano (6, 7), timpani (6), drums (8), Wurlitzer (10)
- Greg Leisz – banjo (3)
- Henry Solomon – saxophone (3, 5, 7)
- Roger Manning – synthesizer (4, 5), piano (6)
- Matt DiMona – keyboards (5)
- Danny Ferenbach – trumpet (5, 6), violin (6)
- Lydia Night – vocals (6)
- John DeBold – electric guitar (9)

Technical

- Emily Lazar – mastering
- Chris Allgood – mastering
- Dave Fridmann – mixing
- Jasmine Chen – engineering
- Matt DiMona – engineering
- Michael Fridmann – mixing assistance

Artwork

- Hernan Ayala – art direction, design
- Matthew Dillon – cover photo, sleeve photo
- Anthony Pham – back cover photo, poster design

== Charts ==
Chart performance for Tell Me That It's Over
Chart (2022)	Peak position
Australian Albums (ARIA)	80
Irish Albums (IRMA)	97
UK Albums (OCC)	88
US Billboard 200	49
US Top Alternative Albums (Billboard)	5
US Top Rock Albums (Billboard)	7
