= Flock of Four =

- Film poster
- Directed by: Gregory Caruso
- Screenplay by: Gregory Caruso; Michael Nader
- Based on: Flock of Four by Gregory Caruso
- Produced by: Gregory Caruso; Dustin Cook; William Day Frank
- Starring: Reg E. Cathey
- Cinematography: Gus Bendinelli
- Edited by: Vic Brown
- Music by: Tim Callobre
- Production companies: The Patwood Company; Bristol Pictures
- Distributed by: Abramorama
- Release date: April 13, 2018
- Running time: 83 minutes
- Country: United States
- Language: English

Flock of Four is a 2018 American adventure comedy-drama film directed by Gregory Caruso and featuring Reg E. Cathey. It is based on Caruso's short film of the same name.

== Cast ==
- Braeden Lemasters
- Uriah Shelton
- Isaac Jay
- Dylan Riley Snyder
- Reg E. Cathey
- Shane Harper
- Coco Jones
- Alexander James Rodriguez
- Nadji Jeter
- Connor Paolo
- Gatlin Green

== Reception ==
The film has a 60% rating on Rotten Tomatoes. Hunter Lanier of Film Threat awarded the film four stars out of five.

The Hollywood Reporter gave the film a positive review, calling it "A deeply earnest attempt to reconcile an old question of race and heritage."

Robert Abele of the Los Angeles Times gave it a negative review and wrote "Though every location is photographed with an almost stately reverence, it is, yes, another mini-odyssey of black history through white eyes..."
