= Totem (film) =

- Theatrical release poster
- Directed by: Marcel Sarmiento
- Written by: Evan Dickson
- Story by: Evan Dickson; Marcel Sarmiento
- Produced by: Adam Hendricks; John H. Lang; Greg Gilreath; William Day Frank
- Starring: Kerris Dorsey; Ahna O'Reilly; James Tupper; Lia McHugh; Braeden Lemasters; Lawrence Pressman
- Cinematography: Harry Lipnick
- Edited by: Phillip Blackford
- Music by: Joseph Bauer
- Production companies: Blumhouse Productions; Divide/Conquer; Gunpowder & Sky; Seer Capital
- Distributed by: Cinemax
- Release date: October 31, 2017 (United States)
- Running time: 89 minutes
- Country: United States
- Language: English

Totem is a 2017 American supernatural horror film directed by Marcel Sarmiento and starring Kerris Dorsey, Ahna O’Reilly and James Tupper. The film is written by Evan Dickson, from a story by Dickson and Sarmiento. The film is a co-production between Blumhouse Productions, Divide/Conquer and Gunpowder & Sky.

The film was released on October 31, 2017 by Cinemax.

== Plot ==
Kellie and Abby are sisters, whose mother Lexy has died. Kellie finds a necklace that belonged to her deceased mother, and finds it can move objects around. She thinks the necklace may somehow be connected to her mother's spirit. The totem manages to knock down a bunch of trophies in Kellie's room, making her father James think she is trying to sabotage his relationship with his girlfriend Robin, who has just moved in.

Robin attempts to take over household duties in order to make Kellie feel like a normal 17-year-old. Kellie feels uncomfortable at this disruption but tries her best to be kind to Robin. Later, Kellie is startled by the vision of a standing corpse wrapped in plastic on the bleachers during track practice. Back home, Robin, gags up long strands of blond hair and is visibly traumatized. Bernard, Lexy's father, visits and introduces himself to Robin. It is revealed during their conversation that Robin knew Lexy and James in the past and had been a mutual friend.

Kellie hangs up Christmas ornaments on all doors and sets up motion detectors to gather evidence of the entity to convince the family. After no movement, she realizes that the entity is more reactive around the family cat. Around the cat's presence, all the motion detectors start beeping frantically causing the cat to scamper away. Kellie threatens the entity with burning the totem. The entity retaliates by making a bookcase fall, crushing the cat.

That night, the entity strengthens and tries to abduct Abby. The family tries to flee and calls Bernard for help. Bernard refuses to believe them, at first. After learning that the entity might be his late daughter, he rushes back into the house endangering everyone in the process. Kellie's boyfriend Todd shows up with some obscure information on how to destroy totems.

Kellie hides Todd in her room. She starts to blame Robin for all the mess. Meanwhile, Bernard is having respiratory issues and Kellie with the ruse of helping him with his inhaler, uses up all the puffs and lets him die.

Robin while searching for Abby discovers a wedding ring hidden in the base of one of Kellie's trophies. When Robin confronts her, Kellie tells her that her mother was weak and that her father needed someone stronger. She pushes her into a bathtub, where Robin hits her head and seemingly drowns.

Kellie sneaks up on Todd, striking him over the head, killing him instantly. She rushes to get Abby out of their crawlspace. She had told Abby to hide. Their dad finds them and seeing the bodies, realizes it was all Kellie's doing. Kellie hits him over the head and ties him to a chair. He comes to while she is trying to destroy the totem. He tries to reason with her. Kellie desperately tries to convince him that they belong together. Robin wakes up and emerges to try to save James and Abby.

Kellie pursues Robin in a rage, attempting to kill her with a glass shard. Her mother's spirit appears, scaring her and causing her to fall back. Kellie is impaled on a piece of pointy weird art thingy, its spike sticking out the side of her face.

The film ends with the three in a tiny house parked in a deserted serene location. They seem to be getting better. Abby continues to talk to someone.

== Cast ==
- Kerris Dorsey as Kellie
- Ahna O'Reilly as Robin
- James Tupper as James
- Lia McHugh as Abby
- Braeden Lemasters as Todd
- Lawrence Pressman as Bernard

== Production ==
Principal photography on the film began in November 2015.

Additional photography took place in December 2016.

== Release ==
The film was shot in the 2:35:1 aspect ratio but was cropped to 1:78:1 to fit HBO/Cinemax broadcast standards. The film was released on October 31, 2017.
