= John Braden (producer) =

- Born: April 18, 1949; Little Rock, Arkansas, U.S.
- Died: May 22, 2004 (aged 55); Pilot Point, Texas, U.S.
- Occupation(s): Writer, producer, and director in both motion pictures and television

John Braden (April 18, 1949 – May 22, 2004) was an American writer, producer, and director of motion pictures and television programs, as well as a public advocate against drugs in the movie industry.

Educated at the Massachusetts Institute of Technology, he was drafted and served in the Vietnam War. Known best for his work on shows including Magnum, P.I., The A-Team, Knight Rider, Dukes of Hazzard, and The Fall Guy, he often worked with producer Harry Thomason.

After marriage, he moved to Lewisville, Texas, and later to Killeen, where he started several companies to serve local military families. Braden died from pneumonia in Pilot Point, Texas.
