= Braden Mclean =

Canadian volleyball player (born 1991)

Braden McLean

Personal information
- Full name: Braden David Bruce McLean
- Nationality: Canadian
- Born: 22 May 1991 (age 35); Prince Albert, Saskatchewan
- Hometown: Birch Hills, Saskatchewan
- Height: 208 cm (6 ft 10 in)
- Weight: 110 kg (243 lb)
- Spike: 358 cm (141 in)
- Block: 332 cm (131 in)
- Education: University of Saskatchewan

Volleyball information
- Position: Middle Blocker
- Number: 7 (national team)

Career
Years	Teams
2009–2014; 2015–2016; 2016–2017; 2017-2018	(Canada) University of Saskatchewan (Sweden) Linköpings (France) Saint-Nazaire (Israel) Maccabi Tel Aviv

National team
2014–2015	Canada

Braden David Bruce McLean (born 22 May 1991) is a retired Canadian male volleyball player. His student-athlete years were played with the Huskies at the University of Saskatchewan, where he was one of the top middle blockers in the country. He was part of the Canada men's national volleyball team. With Team Canada, he played in Pan American Cups, FISU games, FIVB World League, and the U21 World Championship. He has been an assistant coach for the University of Saskatchewan Huskies men's volleyball team since the 2019-2020 season and is a teacher in the Saskatoon Public School Division.
