= Model (album) =

Studio album by Wallows
- Released: May 24, 2024
- Recorded: 2023
- Genres: Indie pop; indie rock
- Length: 37:33
- Label: Atlantic
- Producers: John Congleton; Blake Slatkin

Wallows chronology
Tell Me That It's Over (2022)	Model (2024)	More (2025)

Singles from Model
- 1. "Your Apartment" Released: February 16, 2024; 2. "Calling After Me" Released: March 21, 2024; 3. "Bad Dream" Released: April 26, 2024; 4. "A Warning" Released: May 10, 2024; 5. "You (Show Me Where My Days Went)" Released: May 21, 2024

Model is the third studio album by American indie rock band Wallows. It was released on May 24, 2024, through Atlantic Records. It follows their 2022 studio album, Tell Me That It's Over. It was supported by five singles: "Your Apartment", "Calling After Me", "Bad Dream", "A Warning", and "You (Show Me Where My Days Went)".

== Release and promotion ==
Wallows released the first single from the album, "Your Apartment", on February 16, 2024. On March 5, they announced the album's title and release date, as well as the second single, "Calling After Me", which was released on March 21. On March 20, the album's tracklist was revealed. On April 26, the band released the album's third single, "Bad Dream". On May 10, the fourth single, "A Warning", was released. On May 21, the fifth and final single, "You (Show Me Where My Days Went)", was released accompanied by a music video which premiered on their YouTube channel three days later.

On March 11, the band released a promotional short film shot in the Kia Forum announcing the Model World Tour, on which they will be supported by Benee for their North American leg.

== Critical reception ==
Professional ratings
Review scores
Source	Rating
Clash	8/10
DIY	3/5 stars
Dork	4/5 stars
NME	3/5 stars

Model received generally positive reviews from critics. While many critics praised the album's sound and production, some criticized its repetition and lack of originality. Writing for NME, Anagricel Duran found that the album did not take enough creative risks in comparison to the band's previous releases and felt "bogged down by a few too many wet ballads".

== Track listing ==
All tracks are written by Braeden Lemasters, Dylan Minnette, and Cole Preston, with additional writers noted below.

Model – Standard edition
No.	Title	Writer(s)	Length
1.	"Your Apartment"	Nate Mercereau	3:18
2.	"Anytime, Always"	Sachi DiSerafino	2:04
3.	"Calling After Me"	John Congleton, Blake Slatkin	3:07
4.	"Bad Dream"	Rick Nowels	3:30
5.	"A Warning"	Matthew Compton; Lars Stalfors	3:34
6.	"I Wouldn't Mind"		2:10
7.	"You (Show Me Where My Days Went)"		2:47
8.	"Canada"	Mercereau	2:51
9.	"Don't You Think It's Strange?"		3:27
10.	"She's an Actress"	Mercereau	3:33
11.	"Going Under"	Mercereau	2:51
12.	"Only Ecstasy"		4:21
Total length:			37:33

Model – LP Braeden edition (bonus 7-inch)
No.	Title	Length
1.	"Bad Dream"	3:30
2.	"Not Alone"

Model – LP Cole edition (bonus 7-inch)
No.	Title	Length
1.	"A Warning"	3:34
2.	"Your New Favorite Song"	3:07
Total length:		6:41

Model – LP Dylan edition (bonus 7-inch)
No.	Title	Length
1.	"Calling After Me"	3:07
2.	"Deep Dive"

== Personnel ==
Wallows

- Braeden Lemasters – vocals (tracks 1–7, 9, 11), electric guitar (1–9, 11, 12), acoustic guitar (5, 11), synthesizer (11)
- Dylan Minnette – vocals (all tracks), bass guitar (tracks 1–5, 7–12), bass synthesizer (7, 9), synthesizer (8)
- Cole Preston – drums, percussion (all tracks); synthesizer (tracks 1, 3–12), bass synthesizer (1, 3, 4, 6, 8–12), piano (2, 4, 5, 8, 10–12), vocals (2, 6), electric guitar (3, 4, 6, 7, 10)

Additional contributors

- John Congleton – production, engineering
- Blake Slatkin – production (track 4)
- Randy Merrill – mastering
- Mark Stent – mixing
- Clint Weleander – additional engineering
- Sean Cook – additional engineering
- Kieron Beardmore – mixing assistance
- Matt Wolach – mixing assistance
- Brian Walsh – saxophone (track 10)
- Nate Mercereau – electric guitar (track 11)

== Charts ==
Chart performance for Model
Chart (2024)	Peak position
Australian Albums (ARIA)	14
French Physical Albums (SNEP)	134
Hungarian Physical Albums (MAHASZ)	40
Scottish Albums (Official Charts)	8
UK Albums (Official Charts)	38
US Billboard 200	28
US Top Rock & Alternative Albums (Billboard)	7
