= Senator Braden =

Senator Braden may refer to:

- Henry Braden (1944–2013), Louisiana State Senate
- Thomas H. Braden (1874–after 1941), Massachusetts State Senate
