= Braden Allenby =

American environmental scientist and attorney (born 1950)

Braden R. Allenby
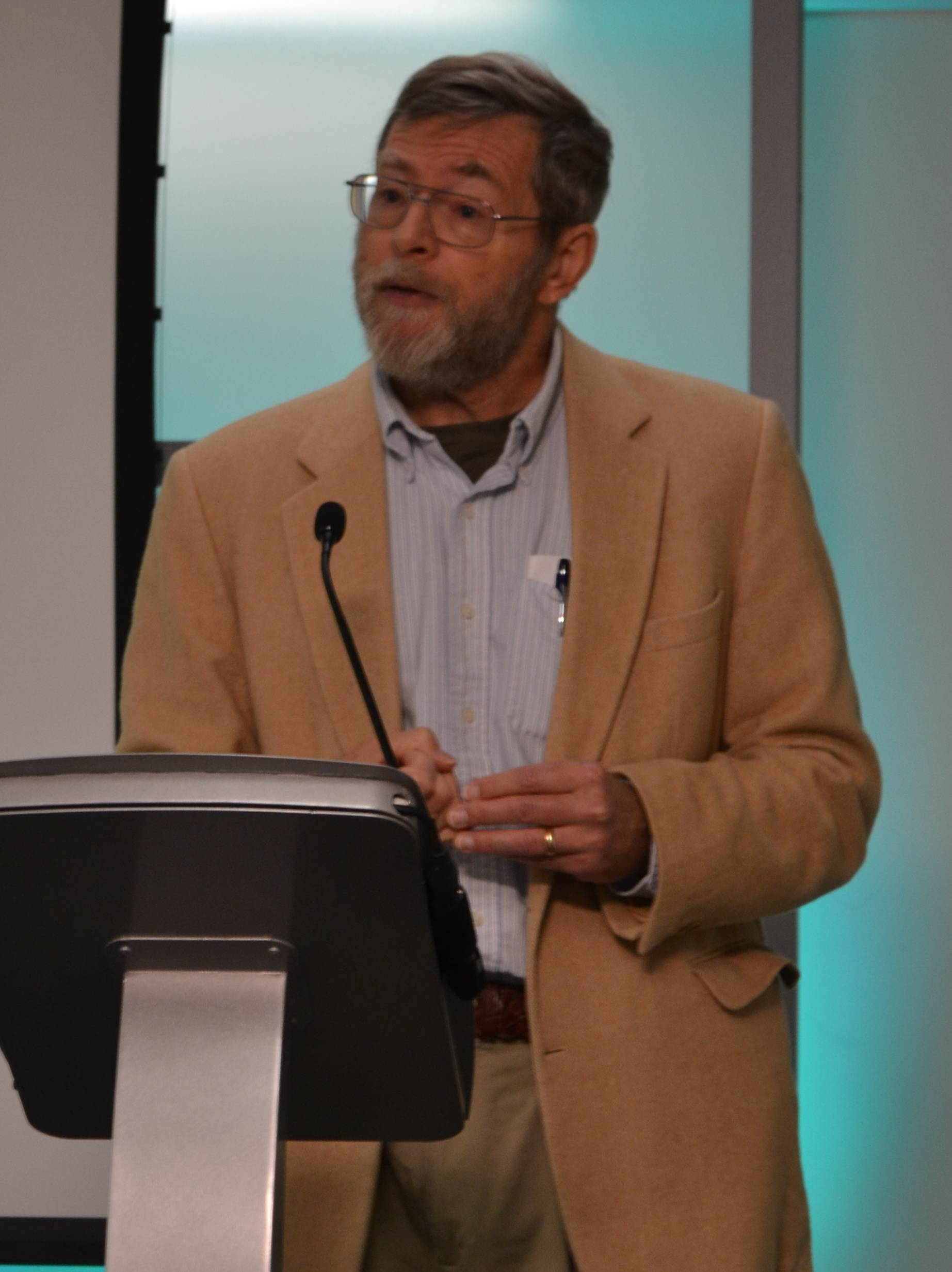
- Allenby in 2015
- Born: 29 December 1950 (age 75); Highland Park, Illinois
- Education: Yale University; University of Virginia; Rutgers University
- Scientific career
- Fields: Earth Systems Engineering and Management; Industrial ecology Environmental Sciences
- Workplaces: AT&T; Lawrence Livermore National Laboratory; Arizona State University

Braden R. Allenby (born 1950) is an American environmental scientist, environmental attorney and Professor of Civil and Environmental Engineering, and of Law, at Arizona State University.

== Biography ==
Allenby was born in Highland Park, Illinois on December 29, 1950, to Dr. Richard J. Allenby, Jr. (1923-2017) and Julia T. Allenby (1925–2002). He is the oldest of three brothers, Dr. Kent Allenby (1952-) and Peter Allenby (1957-).

Allenby graduated cum laude from Yale University in 1972, received his Juris Doctor from the University of Virginia Law School in 1978, his Master's in Economics from the University of Virginia in 1979, his Master's in Environmental Sciences from Rutgers University in the Spring of 1989, and his Ph.D. in Environmental Sciences from Rutgers in 1992.

He joined AT&T in 1983 as a telecommunications regulatory attorney, and was an environmental attorney and Senior Environmental Attorney for AT&T from 1984 to 1993. From 1991 to 1992 he was the J. Herbert Holloman Fellow at the National Academy of Engineering in Washington, DC. During 1992, he was the J. Herbert Holloman Fellow at the National Academy of Engineering in Washington, DC. From 1995 to 1997 he was Director for Energy and Environmental Systems at Lawrence Livermore National Laboratory, on temporary assignment from his position as Research Vice President, Technology and Environment, for AT&T. From 1997 to 2004 he was the Environment, Health, and Safety Vice President for AT&T, with global responsibility for those operations for the firm. In 2004, he moved to Arizona State University, where he is now President's Professor, and Lincoln Professor of Engineering and Ethics. In June, 2000, he chaired the second Gordon Conference on Industrial Ecology.

In 2007 he was President of the International Society for Industrial Ecology; Chair of the AAAS Committee on Science, Engineering, and Public Policy and a Batten Fellow in Residence at the University of Virginia's Darden Graduate School of Business Administration.

He is a member of the Virginia Bar, and has worked as an attorney for the Civil Aeronautics Board and the Federal Communications Commission, as well as a strategic consultant on economic and technical telecommunications issues. He is a Fellow of the Royal Society for the Arts, Manufactures & Commerce. He is currently a member or former member of a number of editorial and advisory boards.

== Work ==
His areas of expertise include: design for environment, earth systems engineering and management, industrial ecology, NBIC (i.e., nanotechnology, biotechnology, information and communication technology, and cognitive science), emerging technologies and technological evolution.

He has taught courses on industrial ecology and design for environment at the Yale University School of Forestry and Environmental Studies, the University of Virginia School of Engineering and Applied Science, and at the University of Wisconsin Engineering Extension School; and has lectured widely on earth systems engineering and management, industrial ecology, design for Environment, and the social and policy implications of emerging technologies, especially information and communication technologies.

Allenby has authored a number of books, articles and book chapters on his above mentioned interests.

== Publications ==
Books:

- 1994, The Greening of Industrial Ecosystems, National Academy Press
- 1994, Environmental Threats and National Security: An International Challenge to Science and Technology, Lawrence Livermore National Laboratory
- 1995, Industrial Ecology, Prentice-Hall
- 1996, Design for Environment, Prentice-Hall
- 1997, Industrial Ecology and the Automobile, Prentice-Hall
- 1998, Industrial Ecology: Policy Framework and Implementation, Prentice-Hall
- 2001, Information Systems and the Environment, National Academy of Engineering – Technology & Engineering
- 2005, Reconstructing earth: Technology and environment in the age of humans. Washington, DC: Island Press.
- 2009, Industrial Ecology and Sustainable Engineering, Prentice-Hall
- 2011, The Techno-Human Condition, The MIT Press
- 2012, "The Theory and Practice of Sustainable Engineering", Pearson Education
- 2015, "The Applied Ethics of Emerging Military and Security Technologies", Ashgate
- 2016, "Future Conflict and Emerging Technologies", Consortium for Science, Policy & Outcomes
- 2017, "Weaponized Narrative: The New Battlespace," New America Foundation/ASU Center on the Future of War
- 2017, "Moral Injury: Towards an International Perspective," New America Foundation/ASU Center on the Future of War

Various Articles:

- Earth systems engineering and management, IEEE Technology and Society Magazine, (2000)
- “Earth systems engineering and management: A manifesto,” Environmental Science & Technology 41, no. 23 (2007): 7960–7965.
- “The ontologies of industrial ecology?,” Progress in Industrial Ecology, An International Journal 3, no. 1 (2006): 28–40.
- “Toward inherently secure and resilient societies,” Science 309, no. 5737 (2005): 1034.
- “The Anthropocene as Media: Information Systems and the Creation of the Human Earth,” American Behavioral Scientist 52, no. 1 (2008): 107.
- “From human to transhuman: Technology and the reconstruction of the world,” Templeton lecture, October 22 (2007): 2007.
- “Ethical Systems in an Age of Accelerating Technological Evolution,” in Electronics and the Environment, 2006. Proceedings of the 2006 IEEE International Symposium on, 2006, 42–44.
- “Complexity in urban systems: ICT and transportation,” in IEEE International Symposium on Electronics and the Environment, 2008. ISEE 2008, 2008, 1–3.
- “Educating engineers in the anthropocene,” in IEEE International Symposium on Electronics and the Environment, 2008. ISEE 2008, 2008, 1–3.
- “Sustainable Engineering Education: Translating Myth to Mechanism,” in Electronics & the Environment, Proceedings of the 2007 IEEE International Symposium on, 2007, 52–56.
- “Earth systems engineering: The role of industrial ecology in an engineered world,” Journal of Industrial Ecology 2, no. 3 (1999): 73–93.
- “Industrial ecology,” foresight 2, no. 02 (2000).
- “Understanding industrial ecology from a biological systems perspective,” co-written with W.E. Cooper, Environmental Quality Management 3, no. 3 (1994).
- “Culture and industrial ecology,” Journal of Industrial Ecology 3, no. 1 (1999): 2–4.

== See also ==
- Industrial ecology
- Earth systems engineering and management
