= Joy Again =

American indie rock band

- Also known as: Forever Lesbians
- Origin: Philadelphia, Pennsylvania, U.S.
- Genre: Indie rock
- Years active: 2014–2024
- Labels: Lucky Number, Arista Records
- Members: Sachi DiSerafino; Arthur Shea; Blaise O'Brien; Kieran Ferris; Zachary Tyndall; Will Butera

Joy Again was an American indie rock band from Philadelphia, Pennsylvania. Founded in 2014, the band consisted of singer and guitarists Sachi DiSerafino and Arthur Shea, keyboardists Blaise O'Brien and Zachary Tyndall, bassist Kieran Ferris, and drummer Will Butera.

The group was originally managed by Shamir and signed to Lucky Number Records, but are now signed to Arista Records.

The band's first release as Joy Again was a self-titled EP in 2017. Previously in 2014, they had released two EPs Sherry and Love, Respect and Wisdom under the name Forever Lesbians. These were published on Bandcamp and as cassettes by Third Floor Tapes. The tracks were later released as a compilation album in 2022 titled Forever. In 2019, the band released their second EP as Joy Again titled Piano. The band opened for Snail Mail on a portion of their 2022 tour.

In January 2023, the band's single "Looking Out For You", originally released in 2016, was certified Silver in the UK by the British Phonographic Industry (BPI) for selling 200,000 equivalent units.

In March 2024, the band announced via a post on Instagram that they would be ending the band after ten years of being together, and announced their final album, Song And Dance, to be released on June 28.

== Band members ==
- Sachi DiSerafino - vocals, guitars
- Arthur Shea - vocals, guitars
- Blaise O'Brien - keyboards
- Kieran Ferris - bass
- Zachary Tyndall - keyboards
- Will Butera - drums

== Discography ==
=== Studio albums ===
- Song And Dance (2024)

=== EPs ===
- Joy Again EP (2017)
- Piano (2019)

=== Singles ===
- How You Feel (2016)
- Looking Out For You (2016)
- On A Farm (2017)
- Kim (2017)
- What Lovers Do (2021)
- Who Knows (2022)
- Let’s Do A Dance (2023)
- Shoobie (2023)
- Angel (2024)

=== Compilation albums ===
- Forever (2014)
