= Remote (EP) =

EP by Wallows
- Released: October 23, 2020
- Recorded: 2020
- Genre: Indie pop; electropop; indie rock
- Length: 16:30
- Label: Atlantic

Wallows chronology
Nothing Happens (2019)	Remote (2020)	Tell Me That It's Over (2022)

Singles from Remote
- 1. "Nobody Gets Me (Like You)" Released: September 9, 2020; 2. "Virtual Aerobics" Released: October 2, 2020; 3. "Wish Me Luck" Released: October 23, 2020

Remote is the second extended play (EP) by American band Wallows. It was released on October 23, 2020, through Atlantic Records. A deluxe version was released on February 19, 2021.

== Background ==
Written and recorded during the COVID-19 lockdowns, the band collaborated virtually through the entirety of the album's creation process:

Remote is a special project for us. We finished it all without seeing each other in person by sending each other voice memos and spending hours chatting on FaceTime. Though the lyrics don't reflect on or reference our time staying at home, the music wouldn't have turned out the way it did if not for quarantine.

== Promotion ==
On September 9, 2020, Wallows released the EP's first single "Nobody Gets Me (Like You)". On October 2, 2020, the EP's second single "Virtual Aerobics" was released. A music video was released alongside each single the same day. On October 28, 2020, an animated music video for "Wish Me Luck" was released. On February 15, 2021, "Quarterback" was released as the third single and first off the deluxe edition of Remote.

== Track listing ==
Track listing adapted from the Apple Music. All songs produced by Wallows, John DeBold, and Sachi DeSarafino, except where noted.

Remote track listing
No.	Title	Writer(s)	Producer(s)	Length
1.	"Virtual Aerobics"	Dylan Minnette; Braeden Lemasters; Cole Preston; John DeBold; Sachi DeSarafino		2:02
2.	"Dig What You Dug"	Minnette; Lemasters; Preston; DeSarafino		2:57
3.	"Nobody Gets Me (Like You)"	Minnette; Lemasters; Preston; DeBold; DeSarafino	DeBold; DeSarafino; Ariel Rechtshaid	2:37
4.	"Coastlines"	Minnette; Lemasters; Preston; Cole Marsden Greif-Neill		3:09
5.	"Talk Like That"	Minnette; Lemasters; Preston; DeSarafino		2:00
6.	"Wish Me Luck"	Minnette; Lemasters; Preston; DeSarafino; Lydia Night; Lars Stalfors		3:45
Total length:				16:30

Deluxe edition
No.	Title	Writer(s)	Producer(s)	Length
7.	"On Time"			2:49
8.	"Quarterback"			3:00
9.	"Another Story"		Wallows	1:42
10.	"OK" (with Remi Wolf and Solomonophonic)	Minnette; Lemasters; Preston; Remi Wolf; Jared Paul Solomon	DeBold; DeSarafino; Wolf; Solomon; John Hill	2:42
11.	"OK"	Minnette; Lemasters; Preston	DeSarafino; Hill; DeBold^{[a]}; Rob Cohen^{[b]}	3:13

Note

- ^{^[a]} indicates an additional producer
- ^{^[b]} indicates a vocal producer

== Personnel ==
Credits partially adapted from Tidal.

Wallows

- Dylan Minnette – vocals (all tracks), claps (3), acoustic guitar (5, 7–9), synthesizer (10, 11), engineer (1, 2, 4–9)
- Braeden Lemasters – piano (1), vocals (2, 3, 5–9), claps (3), guitar (3, 5–9), synthesizer (3, 5, 7–9), electric guitar (6, 9, 11), bass guitar (11), engineer (1, 2, 4–9)
- Cole Preston – acoustic guitar (1, 3), bass guitar (2, 3, 5, 7–10), drum programming (2, 10, 11), drums (2, 3, 11), electric guitar (2, 4, 6, 9, 11), synthesizer (2, 10, 11), claps (3), guitar (6–9), vocals (7, 8), additional programming (10, 11), keyboards (11) engineer (1, 2, 4–9)

Additional musicians

- John DeBold – acoustic guitar (1), bass guitar (1, 2, 4, 5, 7–9), drum programming (1, 2, 4–10), electric guitar (1, 2, 6, 7), claps (3), synthesizer (3, 4, 6, 7)
- Sachi DiSarafino – acoustic guitar (1), ad lib vocals (1), drum programming (1, 4–10), piano (1), programming (2), synthesizer (2–4, 6, 7, 10, 11), claps (3), guitar (3–5, 7–9), vocals (3), additional vocals (5, 7–9), bass guitar (6)
- Ben Lumsdaine – samples (2)
- Albert Hammond Jr. – outro vocals (3)
- Ariel Rechtshaid – autoharp, drum programming, synthesizer (4)
- Jared Solomon – banjo, bass synthesizer, drums, glockenspiel, guitar, keyboards, percussion, vocals (10)
- Remi Wolf – percussion, vocals (10)

Technical

- Emily Lazar – masterer (1–9)
- Caleb Laven – mixer (1–9)
- Nathan Phillips – mixer, masterer (10)
- Manny Marroquin – mixer (11)
- Chris Galland – mixing engineer (11)
- John DeBold – engineer (1–9)
- Sachi DiSarafino –engineer (1, 2, 4–9), additional engineer (11)
- Matt DiMona – engineer (3)
- Rob Cohen – engineer (11)
- Chris Allgood – assistant masterer (1–9)
- Michael Fridmann – assistant mix engineer (1–9)
- Scott Desmarais– assistant mix engineer (11)
- Jeremie Inhaber – assistant mix engineer (11)
- Robin Florent – assistant mix engineer (11)
- Joe LaPorta – assistant mix engineer (11)

== Charts ==
Chart performance for Remote
Chart (2020)	Peak position
US Billboard 200	129
US Top Rock Albums (Billboard)	23
