= Miche Braden =

American singer-songwriter (born 1953)

- Born: November 14, 1953 (age 72); Detroit, Michigan, U.S
- Education: Mackenzie High School; Cooley High School; Michigan State University
- Occupations: Jazz singer and songwriter
- Known for: On-stage portrayals of Bessie Smith and Billie Holiday

Miche Braden (born November 14, 1953) is an American jazz singer and songwriter known for her on-stage portrayals of Bessie Smith and Billie Holiday. Braden, who is originally from Detroit, originated the Bessie Smith role and has been performing it since 2000 in The Devil’s Music: The Life and Blues of Bessie Smith. Braden has been called "the biggest force of nature this side of Hurricane Harvey." She has performed in the musical nationwide, including an off-Broadway run in 2001 and again in 2011, as well as acting as the musical director and writing songs. She was nominated for a Helen Hayes award for her performance in 2018.

== Personal life ==
Braden was born in Detroit, Michigan, and attended Mackenzie High School and Cooley High School. She later attended Michigan State University. While in Detroit, Braden was an artist-in-residence with the Detroit Council of the Arts. She also founded a women's jazz band called Straight Ahead. She describes herself as a protégé of Motown musicians Thomas "Beans" Bowles, Earl Van Dyke and jazz master composer Harold McKinney.
