= Ron Braden =

American football and baseball coach

Biographical details
- Born: August 28, 1948; Marshall County, Tennessee, U.S.
- Died: November 6, 2012 (aged 64); Frankfort, Kentucky, U.S.

Coaching career (HC unless noted)

Football
- 1976–1977: Grambling State (GA)
- 1979: Fisk (assistant)
- 1980–1981: Fisk

Baseball
- 1973–1976: Tennessee State (assistant)
- 1980–1981: Fisk
- 1988–1995: Kentucky State

Basketball
- 1988–1989: Kentucky State (assistant)

Golf
- ?: Kentucky State

Women's volleyball
- 1987–1990: Kentucky State

Administrative career (AD unless noted)
- 1992–1999: Kentucky State (assistant AD)

Head coaching record
- Overall: 0–17 (football); 109–245–3 (baseball)

Ronald Edmond Braden (August 28, 1948 – November 6, 2012) was an American football and baseball coach. He served as the head football coach at Fisk University in Nashville, Tennessee from 1980 to 1981, tallying a mark of 0–17. Braden was also the head baseball coach at Fisk from 1980 to 1981 and at Kentucky State University from 1988 to 1995, compiling a career college baseball coaching record of 109–245–3. Braden died at the age of 64, on November 6, 2012, in Frankfort, Kentucky.

== Head coaching record ==
=== Football ===
Year	Team	Overall	Conference	Standing	Bowl/playoffs
Fisk Bulldogs (Southern Intercollegiate Athletic Conference) (1980–1981)
1980	Fisk	0–8			
1981	Fisk	0–9			
Fisk:		0–17			
Total:		0–17			
