= Andrew D. Braden =

American economist (1916 – 1993)

- Born: 1916
- Died: 1993 (aged 76–77)
- Education: Kent State University
- Occupation: Economist

Andrew D. Braden (1916 – 1993) was an American economist, accountant, and Professor of Accountancy at Case Western Reserve University, known for his work on accounting principles in the 1960s.

Braden received his BS in education from Kent State University, and obtained his Certified Public Accountant certificate. He started his academic career at the Case Western Reserve University in 1946 as instructor in accounting. There he taught accountancy for more than 40 years, and became Professor of Accountancy and director of the Accounting and MBA programs. In 1962 he published his main work Accounting principles, co-authored with Robert G. Allyn. In memory of his work Case Western initiated the Andrew D. Braden Professor of Accounting and Auditing-chair, and the Andrew D. Braden Fund.

== Selected publications ==
- Braden, Andrew D., and Robert G. Allyn. Accounting principles. Van Nostrand, 1963.

Articles, a selection

- Braden, Andrew D. "The Need for Simplicity in the Teaching of Accounting." Accounting Review (1954): 499–500.
- Braden, Andrew D. "The Blackboard versus Projected Still Pictures in the Teaching of Accounting-An Experiment." Accounting Review (1954): 683–687.
