= Kerris Dorsey =

American actress (born 1998)

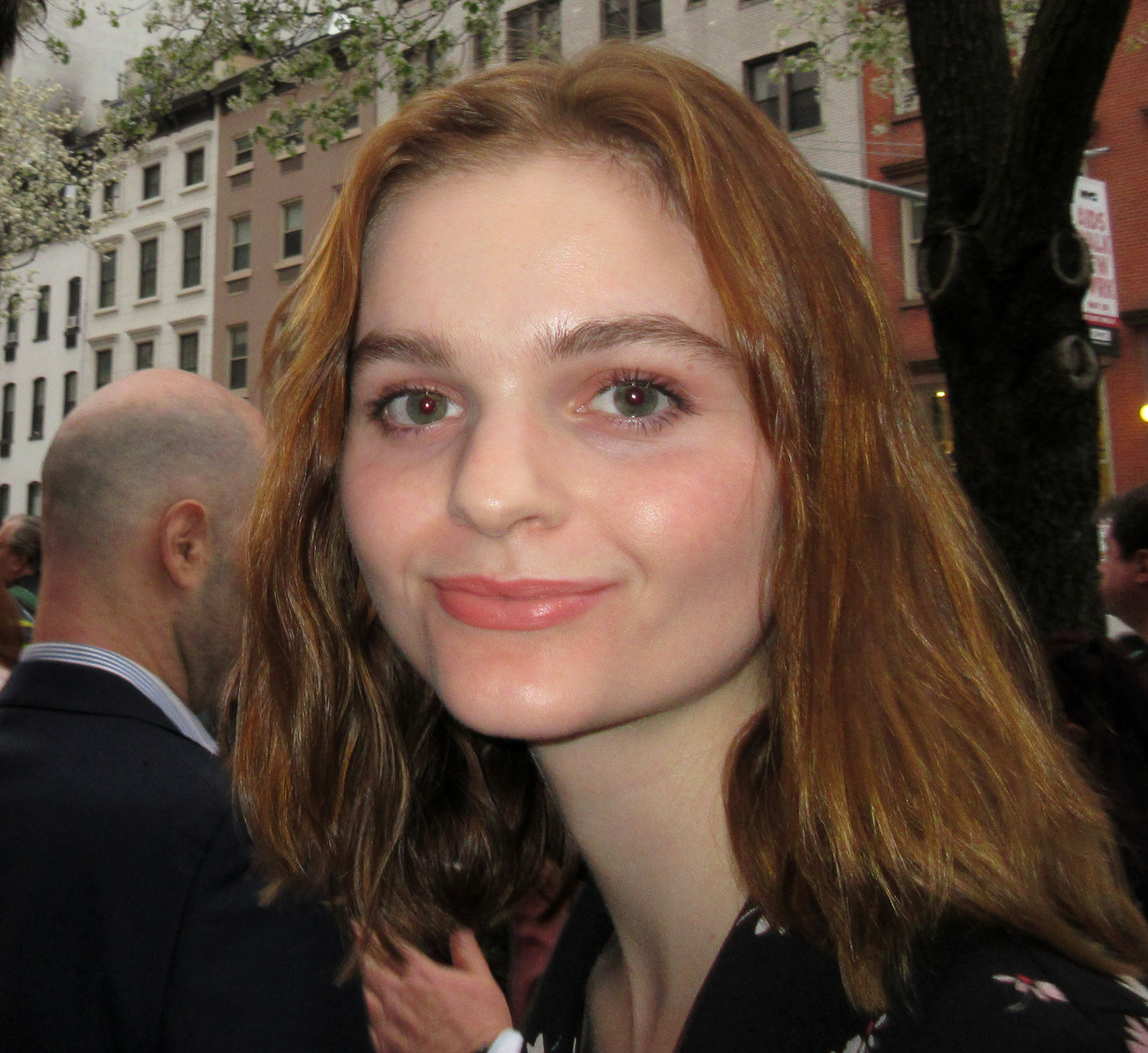
- Dorsey in 2018
- Born: January 9, 1998 (age 28)
- Occupation: Actress
- Years active: 2005–present
- Website: kerrisdorsey.com

Kerris Dorsey (born January 9, 1998) is an American actress. She is known for her roles as Paige Whedon in the television series Brothers & Sisters; Casey Beane, Billy Beane's daughter, in the 2011 film Moneyball; and as Emily Cooper in the 2014 film Alexander and the Terrible, Horrible, No Good, Very Bad Day. Dorsey also portrayed Bridget Donovan, the daughter of the title character, in the television series Ray Donovan.

== Career ==
Dorsey appeared in the films Walk the Line and Just Like Heaven, both released in 2005. She played a supporting role in the American Girl film McKenna Shoots For the Stars as McKenna Brooks's reading tutor, Josie.

In Moneyball (2011), she portrays Oakland Athletics' general manager Billy Beane's kid daughter and performs a cover of Lenka's song "The Show". Beane listens to it in the final scene, while driving home back from Boston where he was offered the job with the Red Sox and turned it down. Her version features in the film's soundtrack.

In 2012, Dorsey guest starred on the Disney Channel series Shake it Up.

Dorsey guest starred as Molly in one episode in Don't Trust the B— in Apartment 23, and had a small role in Sons of Anarchy as Ellie Winston. In 2012, she was in a supporting role as Sadie in the Disney Channel Original Movie Girl vs. Monster. She starred as Bridget Donovan on the Showtime crime drama series Ray Donovan.

== Filmography ==
Film
Year	Title	Role
2005	Walk the Line	Kathy Cash
2005	Just Like Heaven	Zoe Brody
2009	Fuel	Young Sandy
2011	Moneyball	Casey Beane
2011	JumpRopeSprint	Alex Ruggle
2012	An American Girl: McKenna Shoots for the Stars	Josie Myers
2014	Alexander and the Terrible, Horrible, No Good, Very Bad Day	Emily Cooper
2016	Don't Tell Kim	Alex Ruggle
2017	Totem	Kellie
2020	Jumping the Gun	Alex Ruggle
2022	Ray Donovan: The Movie	Bridget Donovan
2026	I Love Boosters	Jamie

Television
Year	Title	Role	Notes
2006	Scrubs	Kid #3	Episode: "My Day at the Races"
2006	Monk	Little Girl	Episode: "Mr. Monk and the Captain's Marriage"
2006	So Notorious	Little Drew Barrymore	Episode: "Charitable"
2006	Vanished	Becky Javit	2 episodes
2006–2011	Brothers & Sisters	Paige Whedon	Regular role (Seasons 1-4); Recurring role (Season 5)
2007	Medium	Young Jennie Heffernan	Episode: "No One to Watch Over Me"
2008	Carpoolers	Phone Girl	2 episodes
2009	Flower Girl	Flower Girl	Television film
2011	Sons of Anarchy	Ellie Winston	Episode: "Out"
2011	R. L. Stine's The Haunting Hour	Lisa	Episode: "Dreamcatcher"
2012	Shake It Up	Kat	Episode: "Copy Kat It Up"
2012	Don't Trust the B— in Apartment 23	Molly	Episode: "Parent Trap..."
2012	Girl vs. Monster	Sadie	Television film
2013	Mad Men	Sandy	Episode: "The Doorway, Part 1"
2013–2020	Ray Donovan	Bridget Donovan	Main cast
