= Bradin =

Bradin is both a surname and a given name. Notable people with the name include:

- Jean Bradin (1899–1969), French actor
- Bradin Hagens (born 1989), American baseball player

== See also ==
- Radin
