= Braden =

Braden may refer to:

- Braden (given name)
- Braden (surname)
- Braden, Illinois, an unincorporated community, United States
- Braden, Tennessee, a town in Fayette County, Tennessee, United States
- Braden, Union County, Tennessee, an unincorporated community in Tennessee, United States
- Braden, West Virginia, an unincorporated community, United States
- Braden River, a river in Florida, United States
- Braden (brand), a brand of winches owned by Paccar

== See also ==
- Braden Scale for Predicting Pressure Ulcer Risk
