= C. O. Braden =

American football coach

Biographical details
- Born: November 5, 1891; Baldwin City, Kansas, U.S.
- Died: August 22, 1969 (aged 77); Independence, Kansas, U.S.

Coaching career (HC unless noted)
- 1925–1926: Dickinson State

Head coaching record
- Overall: 1–1

Clyde Owen Braden (November 5, 1891 – August 22, 1969) was an American college football coach. He was the first head football coach at Dickinson State College—now known as Dickinson State University–in Dickinson, North Dakota and held that position for two seasons, from 1925 until 1926. His coaching record at Dickinson State 1–1.

Braden also served as Dean of Men at the college in 1924. In 1926, Braden returned to Kansas City, Missouri to work in the insurance business.
