= Wallows =

American alternative rock band

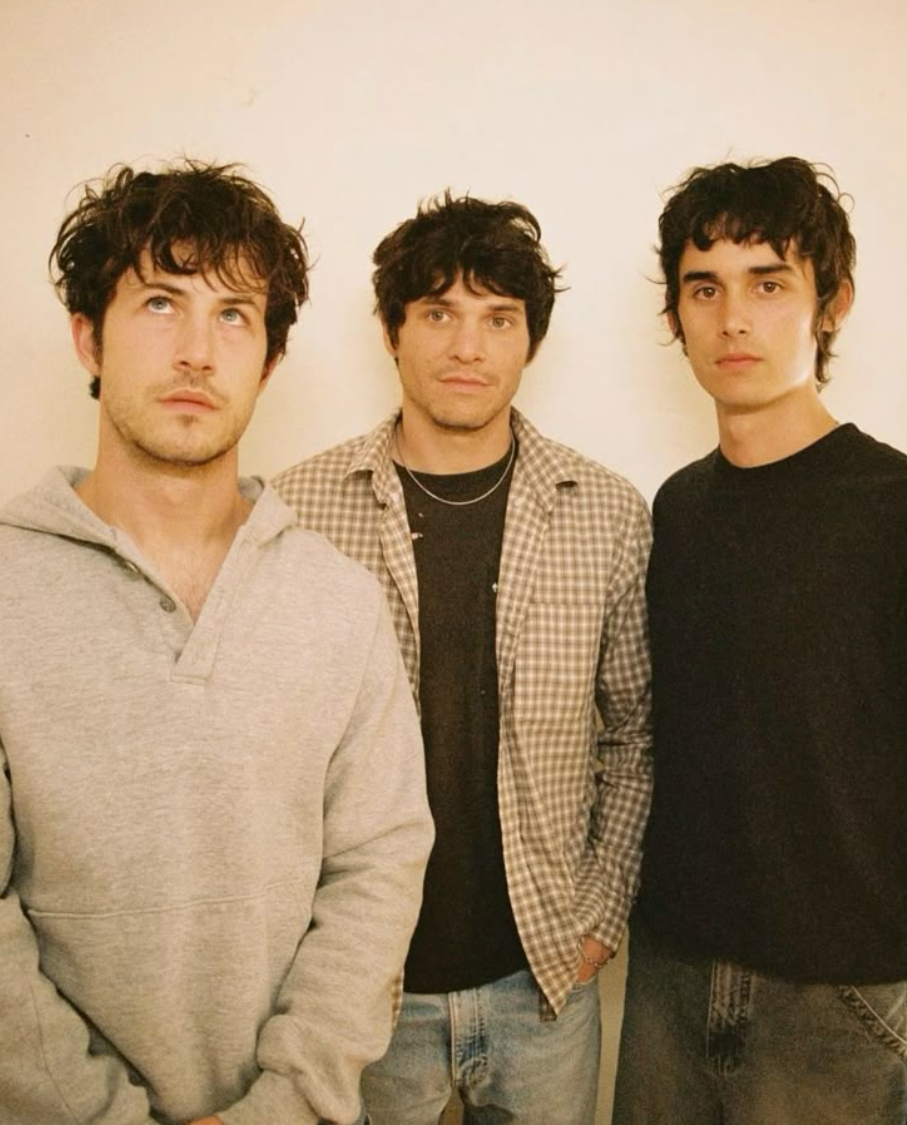
- Wallows in 2024. From left to right: Dylan Minnette, Braeden Lemasters, and Cole Preston

Background information
- Also known as: The Feaver (2011–2014), The Narwhals (2014–2017)
- Origin: Los Angeles, California, U.S.
- Genres: Alternative rock; indie rock; bedroom pop; indie pop; power pop
- Years active: 2011–present (Note: The group first performed as The Narwhals in 2011, but it was not until around 2017 that they changed their name and became well-known under the name Wallows.)
- Label: Atlantic
- Members: Dylan Minnette; Braeden Lemasters; Cole Preston
- Past members: Zack Mendenhall
- Website: wallowsmusic.com

Wallows is an American alternative rock band based in Los Angeles composed of Dylan Minnette, Braeden Lemasters, and Cole Preston. The band began releasing songs independently in April 2017.

In 2018 Wallows signed a deal with Atlantic Records and released their major-label debut EP, Spring. The band released their debut studio album, Nothing Happens, in 2019, which featured the single "Are You Bored Yet?", followed by their 2020 EP Remote. The band released their second album Tell Me That It's Over in 2022. Their third, Model, was released in 2024.

== History ==
=== 2011–2018: Early years, singles, and Spring EP ===
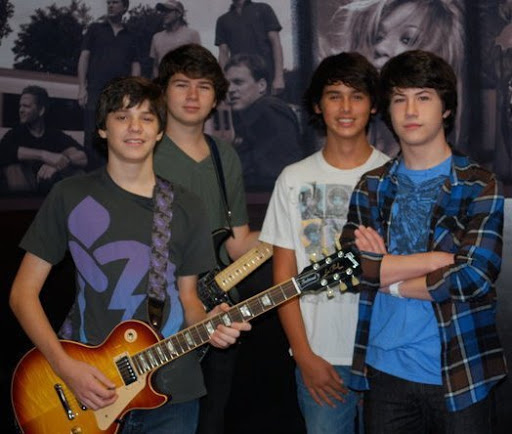
From left: Braeden Lemasters, Zack Mendenhall, Cole Preston, and Dylan Minnette in 2011

As teenagers in 2011, Braeden Lemasters (guitar/vocals), Cole Preston (guitar/drums), and Dylan Minnette (guitar/vocals) formed the band at a music studio called Join the Band in Van Nuys with Zack Mendenhall (bass). They were students enrolled in the GigMasterz program at Keyboard Galleria Music Center in Southern California. They chose to name themselves The Feaver and played the 2011 Warped Tour. They also used the name The Narwhals before settling on Wallows in 2017, now without Mendenhall. Prior to becoming Wallows, the only official collection of songs released by the band consisted of a 4-song EP called "The Narwhals" in October 2014.

In April 2017, the band released their first single under the Wallows moniker, "Pleaser". In May 2017, Wallows released a second single, "Sun Tan", and began playing live shows in the Los Angeles area, selling out The Roxy and the Troubadour. Their third single, "Uncomfortable", was released in September 2017.

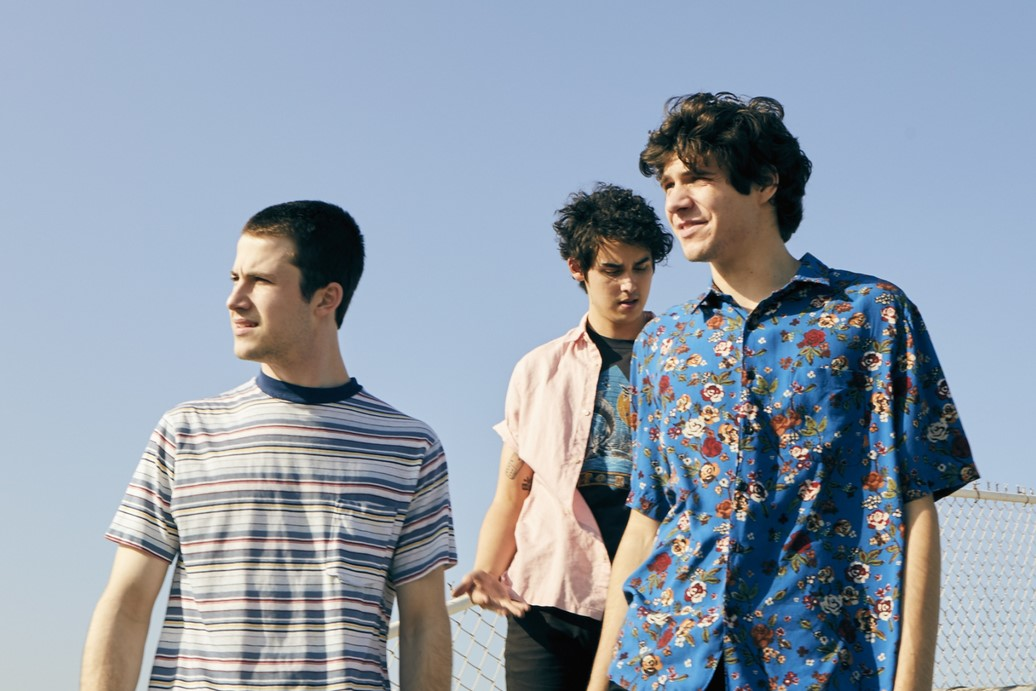
Wallows in 2018

In November 2017, their song "Pulling Leaves off Trees" premiered on Zane Lowe's Beats 1 radio show. That month, the band also announced their first headlining North American tour that would run from January to March 2018. The tour started in San Francisco on January 24. In February 2018, the band announced that they had signed to Atlantic Records and were planning to release their major label debut EP, Spring, in April 2018. They also released a new single, "Pictures of Girls", their first on Atlantic. The song was chosen as a "Critical Cut" by SiriusXM Alt Nation.

Wallows ended their North American tour at South by Southwest in March 2018. Later in the month, they released a second track from Spring titled "These Days". The EP was released on April 6, 2018, by Atlantic Records and was produced by John Congleton.

=== 2019–2021: Nothing Happens and Remote EP ===
On February 1, 2019, the band released a single titled "Are You Bored Yet?" featuring Clairo, along with a music video featuring cameo appearances from Noah Centineo and The Regrettes. The music video was subsequently nominated for an MTV Video Music Award in the "Best Push Performance of the Year" category. "Are You Bored Yet?" was a certified 2× platinum single by the RIAA, becoming the band's first song to be certified platinum. This song serves as the lead single to their debut album, Nothing Happens, released on March 22, 2019. The album received generally positive reviews and peaked at number 75 on the US Billboard 200. It also reached No. 8 and 13 on the Billboard Alternative and Rock Album charts respectively.

Wallows embarked on another leg of their Nothing Happens Tour in February 2020, for 15 additional stops. The band partnered with local non-profit charities in each of the cities in this leg of the tour such as Project Lazarus and the LGBT Center of Raleigh. Before each show, the band posted a list of donatable items for their attendees to bring (with the incentive of donating being a free Wallows pin) on their social media accounts, and were able to garner a plethora of items to donate after each show. In an interview with 97X, a Tampa radio station, Minnette remarked that the nonprofit organization they partnered with in Fort Lauderdale, Florida, Handy Inc., shared that Wallows fans had brought an equivalent of five months' worth of supplies to the band's show.

On March 20, 2020, Wallows released a new single "OK" alongside a music video. On September 9, 2020, Wallows released another single "Nobody Gets Me (Like You)" alongside the announcement for their second major EP, Remote that was released on October 23, 2020. On February 15, 2021, Wallows announced a deluxe version of Remote alongside the release of a new single "Quarterback". The deluxe edition was released on February 19, 2021, with two new tracks, the previously released single, "OK", and a remixed version of "OK" that features Remi Wolf and Solomonophonic.

=== 2021–present: Tell Me That It's Over, Model, and More ===
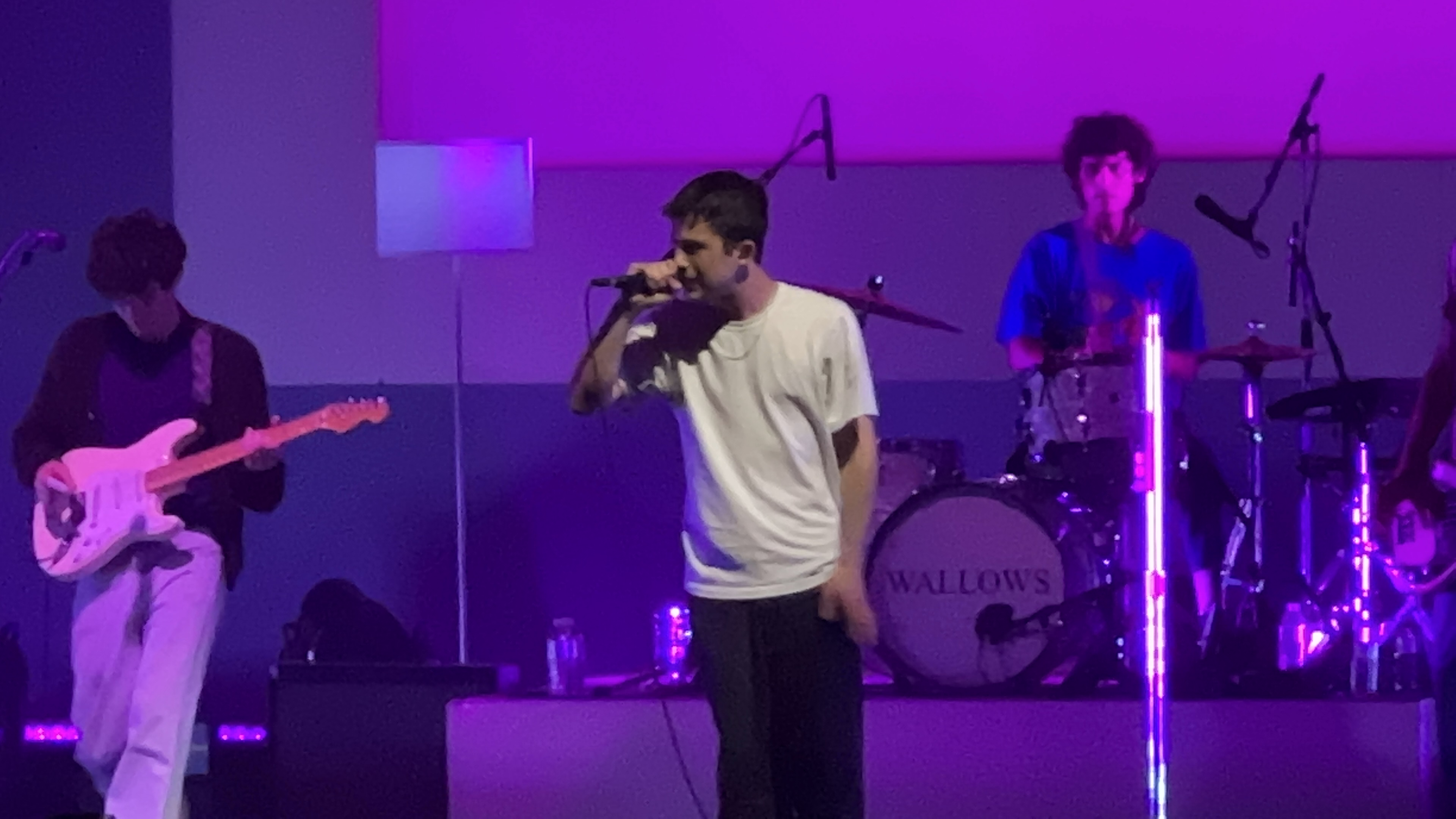
Wallows performing at Palace Theatre, 2023

On September 30, 2021, Wallows released the single "I Don't Want to Talk". This song is the lead single off of their sophomore album, Tell Me That It's Over, released on March 25, 2022. Wallows embarked on their Tell Me That It's Over Tour in April 2022 and toured throughout 2022 and into 2023. Wallows performed at Coachella 2022 which was headlined by Harry Styles, Billie Eilish and The Weeknd x Swedish House Mafia.

On February 16, 2024, Wallows released "Your Apartment", the lead single from their third album. On March 5, 2024, Wallows announced the album, Model, which was released on May 24, 2024, along with the announcement of the single "Calling After Me", which was issued on March 21, 2024. Along with the announcement of Model Wallows released a short film to accompany the album. Wallows released two new singles titled "Bad Dream" and "A Warning" on April 26, 2024 and May 10, 2024, respectively.

On January 10, 2025, Wallows released the single "Your New Favorite Song". A month later on February 7, 2025, the band announced their third EP, titled More, which released on March 28, 2025. A second single, "Coffin Change", was released on February 20.

== Musical style and influences ==
Wallows' musical style has mainly been described as alternative rock, post-punk, power pop, indie rock, bedroom pop, indie pop and surf punk.

Wallows have cited Arctic Monkeys, The Strokes, The Libertines, Arcade Fire, Kanye West, and The Smiths as artistic influences.

== Band members ==
Current
- Dylan Minnette – lead and backing vocals, rhythm guitar, occasional keyboards and bass (2011–present)
- Braeden Lemasters – lead and backing vocals, lead guitar, occasional bass (2011–present)
- Cole Preston – drums, percussion, occasional guitars, keyboards, piano, and vocals (2011–present)

Touring

- Danny Ferenbach – trumpet, keyboards (2017–present)
- Kevin Grimmett – guitar, keyboards (2022–present), bass (2017–2018)
- Blake Morell – bass (2018–present)

Former

- Zack Mendenhall – bass (2011–2017)

== Discography ==
- Nothing Happens (2019)
- Tell Me That It's Over (2022)
- Model (2024)

== Tours ==
Headlining

- Nothing Happens Tour (2019—2020)
- Tell Me That It's Over Tour (2022—2023)
- Model Tour (2024)
- Model and More Tour (2025)

== Awards and nominations ==
Year	Award	Category	Winner(s) / Work(s)	Result	Ref.
2020	MTV Europe Music Award	Best Push Act	Themselves	Nominated	
2021	MTV Video Music Awards	Best Push Performance of the Year	"Are You Bored Yet?" (featuring Clairo)	Nominated	
2021	iHeartRadio Music Award	Best New Rock/Alternative Rock Artist	Themselves	Nominated	
