= Spring (Wallows EP) =

2018 EP by Wallows

EP by Wallows
- Released: April 6, 2018
- Genre: Indie pop
- Length: 22:35
- Label: Atlantic
- Producer: John Congleton

Wallows chronology
The Narwhals (2014)	Spring (2018)	Nothing Happens (2019)

Singles from Spring
- 1. "Pictures of Girls" Released: February 23, 2018; 2. "These Days" Released: March 23, 2018; 3. "1980s Horror Film" Released: September 19, 2018

Spring is the debut extended play (EP) by American band Wallows. It was released on April 6, 2018 through Atlantic Records.

== Background ==
On February 23, 2018, Wallows released the EP's first single "Pictures of Girls"; a subsequent music video was released the same day. The EP's second single "These Days" was released on March 23, 2018. On June 25, 2018, a music video for "These Days" was released and is currently the second most popular video on the Wallows YouTube channel.

== Track listing ==
All tracks are written by Dylan Minnette, Cole Preston, and Braeden Lemasters. Any additional writers are noted under "Writer(s)".

Track title and length adopted from Apple Music.

No.	Title	Writer(s)	Length
1.	"Ground"		3:33
2.	"It's Only Right"		4:34
3.	"Let the Sun In"		3:42
4.	"These Days"	Remi Wolf – Julian McClanahan	3:24
5.	"1980s Horror Film"		3:44
6.	"Pictures of Girls"		3:24
Total length:			22:35
