= Braeden Lemasters =

American actor and musician (born 1996)

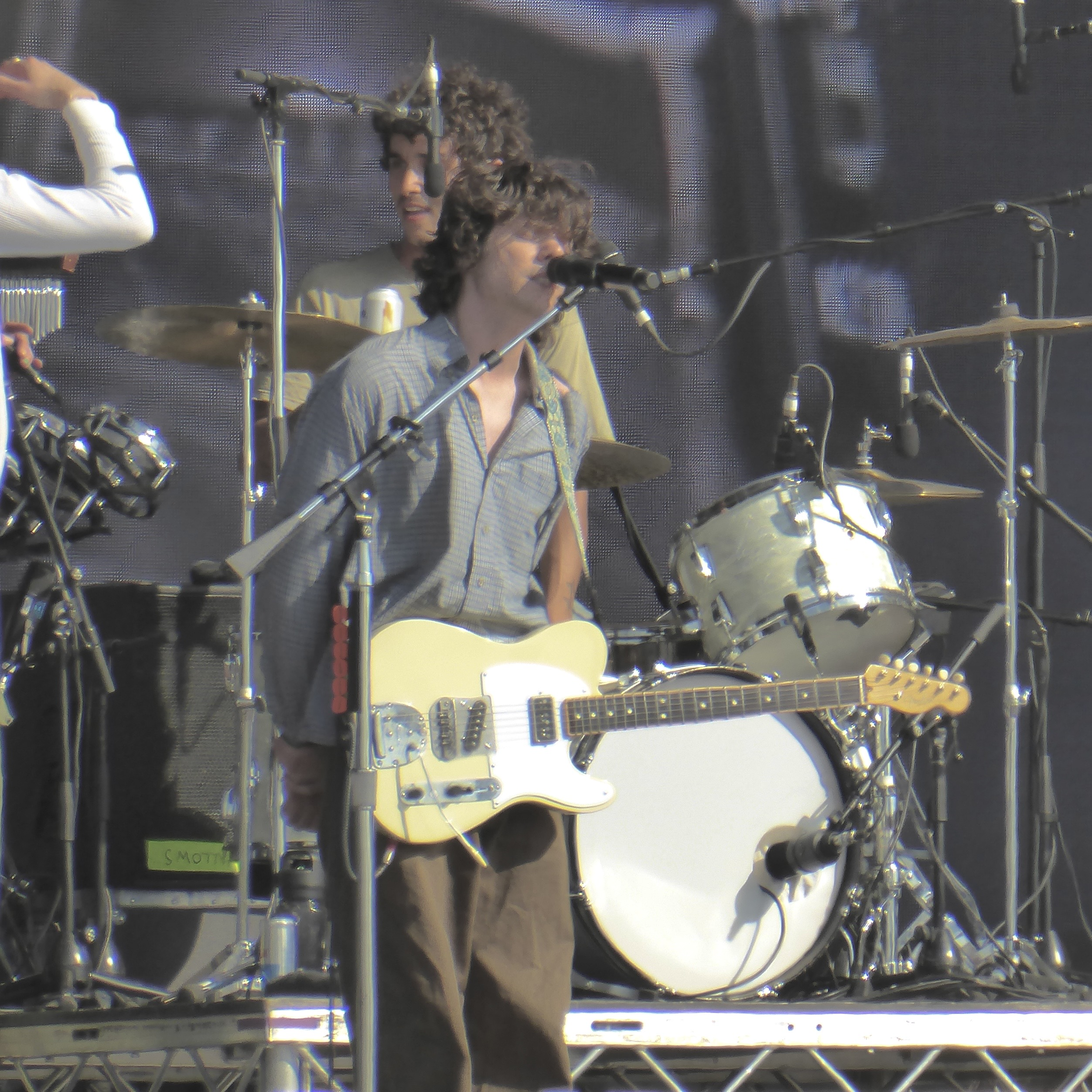
- Lemasters performing with Wallows at the Reading Festival in 2025
- Born: Braeden Matthew Lemasters; January 27, 1996 (age 30); Warren, Ohio, U.S.
- Occupations: Actor; musician
- Years active: 2005–present
- Musical career
- Genres: Alternative rock; indie rock
- Instruments: Guitar; vocals
- Member of: Wallows

Braeden Matthew Lemasters (born January 27, 1996) is an American musician and actor. He began his career as a child actor, receiving recognition for his role as Albert Tranelli in the TNT comedy-drama series Men of a Certain Age (2009–2011). He has made guest appearances in several television series such as, Criminal Minds, ER, House, Grey's Anatomy and Amazon Prime Video's The Romanoffs. Lemasters has also appeared in the thriller film The Stepfather (2009), the romantic comedy film Easy A (2010), the family comedy film A Christmas Story 2 (2012), and the horror film Totem (2017). Lemasters is the lead guitarist and co-lead singer for the alternative rock band Wallows.

== Early life ==
Braeden Matthew Lemasters was born in Warren, Ohio, to David and Michelle Lemasters. He has an older brother, Austin. When he was nine his family moved to Santa Clarita, California, so that he could pursue a career in acting. Lemasters was musically influenced by his father, who was a guitarist and used to play at local places around Warren with the later incarnation of Left End as well as groups like Triple Play and The Benders.

He grew up listening to The Beatles and Arctic Monkeys, and learned how to play guitar. During middle school, he joined the band The Feaver with his friends and future Wallows members, Cole Preston and Dylan Minnette.

== Career ==
=== Acting ===
After appearing in a McDonald’s commercial that aired during the Super Bowl, Lemasters began his acting career at the age of 9, playing the role of Frankie in an episode of Six Feet Under in 2005. In 2006, he played the role of a child with autism in the medical drama television series House. Subsequently he had minor roles in Criminal Minds, ER, and The Closer. In April 2007, he appeared as Jacob Marshall-LaHaye in the Christian drama television film Love's Unending Legacy, for which he earned his first Young Artist Award nomination. Later that year he was featured in Sacrifices of the Heart, Life, Grey's Anatomy and Wainy Days.

From 2009, Lemasters began starring in the TNT series Men of a Certain Age as Albert Tranelli. He earned various awards and nominations for the role, including a Peabody Award and a nomination for Young Artist Award for Best Performance in a TV Series. He was in the show for two seasons until it ended in 2011. He also had a supporting role in the 2009 remake of The Stepfather. In 2010, he appeared in the teen romantic comedy film Easy A, as the young version of Penn Badgley's character Todd. The following year, he starred as Ralphie Parker in the sequel to A Christmas Story.

From 2013-2014, Lemasters starred as Victor McAllister in ABC's drama series Betrayal. The next year, Lemasters starred in the horror comedy film R.L. Stine's Monsterville: Cabinet of Souls alongside Dove Cameron and Tiffany Espensen. In 2017, Lemasters was cast as Trevor in the second season of T@gged. He reprised the role again in the third season of the series. In April 2018, he starred in the adventure comedy drama Flock of Four, in which he played Joey Grover, a talented amateur pianist in 1950s Pasadena.

=== Music ===
In addition to acting, Lemasters is also a singer and lead guitarist for the band Wallows with Cole Preston (drums), and Dylan Minnette (singer, guitar). The band won the Battle Of The Bands Contest (2010) sponsored by radio station KYSR in 2010 and played on the 2011 Vans Warped Tour. They have since performed at several popular Los Angeles venues including the Roxy Theater and Whisky a Go Go.

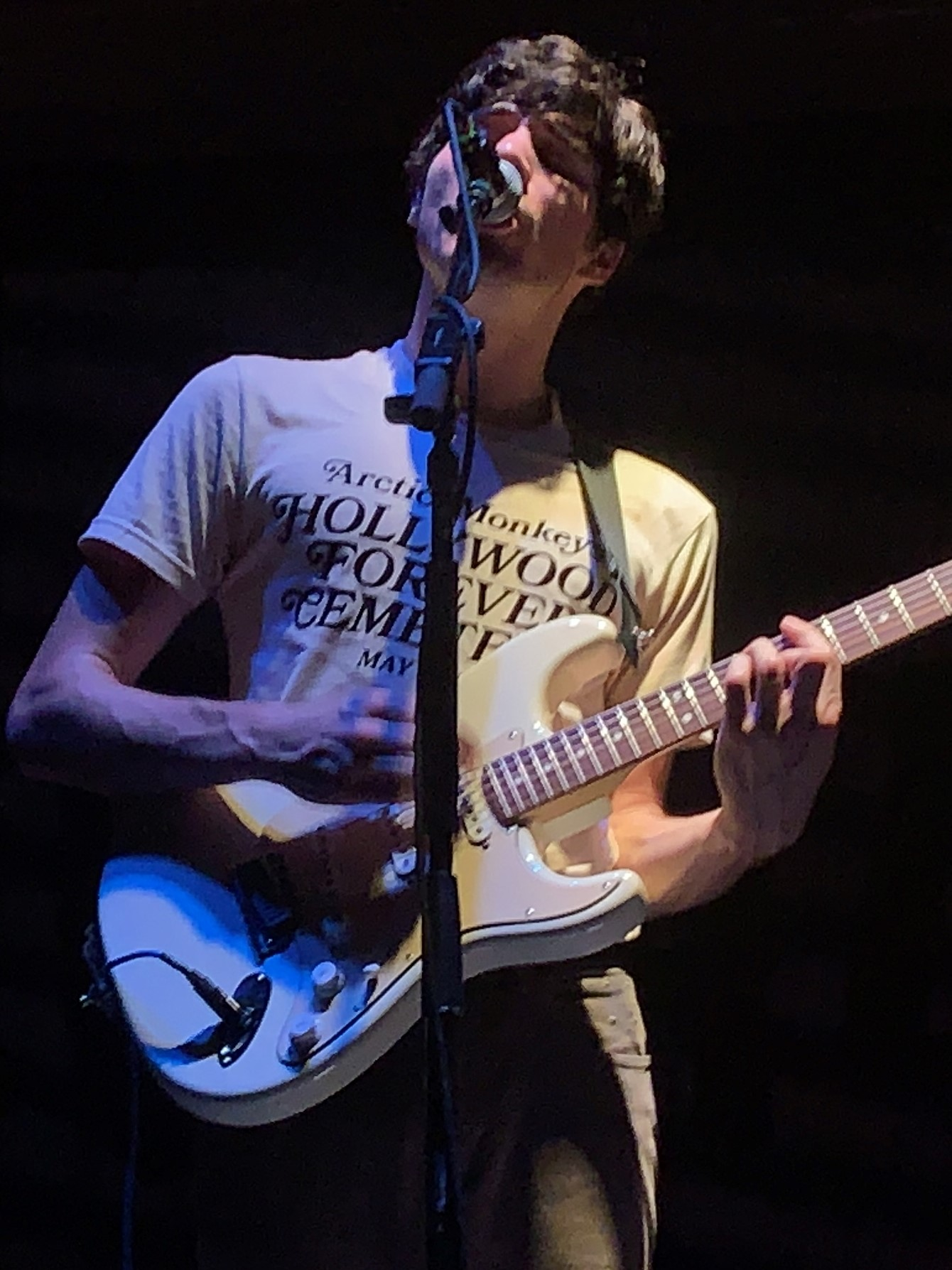
Lemasters performing with Wallows in 2019

The band began releasing songs independently in April 2017 starting with "Pleaser", which reached number two on the Spotify Global Viral 50 chart.

In 2018, Wallows signed a deal with Atlantic Records and released their major label debut EP, Spring, including singles "Pictures of Girls" and "These Days". They performed "Pictures of Girls" on The Late Late Show with James Corden on May 8, 2018. The band released their debut studio album, Nothing Happens in 2019, which featured the hit single "Are You Bored Yet?" In 2020, they released their second EP Remote. The band released their sophomore album Tell Me That It's Over in March 2022, which was followed by their third studio album Model, released in 2024.

== Filmography ==
=== Film ===
Film appearances by Braeden Lemasters
Year	Title	Role	Notes
2008	Beautiful Loser	Jake	
2009	The Stepfather	Sean Harding	
2010	Easy A	8th Grade Todd	
2012	A Christmas Story 2	Ralph "Ralphie" Parker	Direct-to-video released film
2017	Totem	Todd	
2018	Flock of Four	Joey Grover	

=== Television ===
Television appearances by Braeden Lemasters
Year	Title	Role	Notes
2005	Six Feet Under	Frankie	Episode: "Eat a Peach"
2006	Criminal Minds	Eric Fisher	Episode: "Poison"
2006	ER	Sean	Episode: "The Gallant Hero and the Tragic Victor"
2006	The Closer	Charlie Hubbard	Episode: "Blue Blood"
2006	House	Adam	Episode: "Lines in the Sand"
2007	Sacrifices of the Heart	Young Ryan	TV movie
2007	Love's Unending Legacy	Jacob Marshall	TV movie
2007	Life	Tyler Hawley	Pilot
2007	Grey's Anatomy	Brian	Episode: "Physical Attraction... Chemical Reaction"
2007	Wainy Days	Young David	2 episodes
2008	Law & Order: Special Victims Unit	David Zelinsky	Episode: "Unorthodox"
2008	Eli Stone	Brian Swain	Episode: "Father Figure"
2008	Ghost Whisperer	Michael Wilkins	Episode: "Stranglehold"
2008	Saving Grace	Tommy Ward	Episode: "It's a Fierce, White-Hot, Mighty Love"
2008	Cold Case	Seth Lundgren '69	Episode: "One Small Step"
2008	Chasing a Dream	Cam	TV movie
2009	NCIS	Noah Taffet	Episode: "Hide and Seek"
2009–2011	Men of a Certain Age	Albert	
2010	The Haney Project	Ray	Episode: "Mental Breakdown"
2011	R.L. Stine's The Haunting Hour	Rob	Episode: "The Hole"
2012	Wedding Band	Shane	Episode: "Get Down on It"
2013–2014	Betrayal	Victor McAllister	13 episodes
2015	R.L. Stine's Monsterville: Cabinet of Souls	Kellen	TV movie
2016	11.22.63	Mike Coslaw	2 episodes
2016	The Price Is Right	Himself	1 episode
2017–2018	T@gged	Trevor	17 episodes: recurring (season 2), main (season 3)
2018	The Romanoffs	Andrew	Episode: "The Royal We"
2018; 2019	The Late Late Show with James Corden	Himself	Performing alongside his band Wallows
2019	The Tonight Show Starring Jimmy Fallon	Himself	Performing alongside his band Wallows
2020; 2024	Jimmy Kimmel Live!	Himself	Performing alongside his band Wallows

=== Video games ===
List of voice and dubbing performances in video games
Year	Title	Voice Role	Notes	Ref.
2006	Thrillville	Child Male 1		
2007	Thrillville: Off the Rails	Child Male 1	Sequel of Thrillville	

== Awards and nominations ==
Year	Award	Category	Work	Result	Refs
2008	CAMIE Awards	Television - Made for TV Movie	Love's Unending Legacy	Won	
2008	Young Artist Award	Best Performance in a TV Movie, Miniseries or Special - Supporting Young Actor	Love's Unending Legacy	Nominated	
2009	Young Artist Award	Best Performance in a TV Series - Guest Starring Young Actor	Law & Order: Special Victims Unit	Nominated	
2011	Young Artist Award	Best Performance in a TV Series (Comedy or Drama) - Supporting Young Actor	Men of a Certain Age	Nominated	
2011	Peabody Awards	—N/a	Men of a Certain Age	Won	
