= Dylan Minnette =

American actor and musician (born 1996)

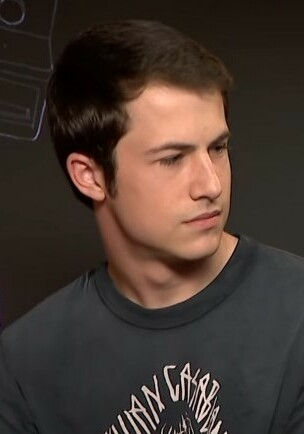
- Minnette in 2018
- Born: Dylan Christopher Minnette; December 29, 1996 (age 29); Evansville, Indiana, U.S.
- Occupations: Actor; musician
- Years active: 2005–present
- Musical career
- Genres: Alternative rock; indie rock; indie pop
- Instruments: Vocals; guitar; keyboard; bass guitar
- Label: Atlantic
- Member of: Wallows

Dylan Christopher Minnette (born December 29, 1996) is an American actor and musician. He is known for his role as Clay Jensen in the Netflix drama series 13 Reasons Why. He is also a member of the alternative rock band Wallows.

He began his career as a child actor and received recognition for his role as a younger version of the character Michael Scofield on Prison Break. He then won a Young Artist Award for his role as Clay Norman in the TNT series Saving Grace. Minnette had a supporting role in the 2010 romantic horror film Let Me In. He played Ralph Dover in the thriller film Prisoners (2013) and Anthony Cooper in the family film Alexander and the Terrible, Horrible, No Good, Very Bad Day (2014). Minnette then starred in the horror comedy Goosebumps (2015). He has also starred in the horror films Don't Breathe (2016), The Open House (2018) and Scream (2022).

== Early life ==
Dylan Christopher Minnette was born on December 29, 1996, in Evansville, Indiana, the only child of Robyn and Craig Minnette. His father was a musician who played in many bands under the stage name "Eddie Minnette".

As a child, his family moved from Evansville to Champaign, Illinois, where they lived for 5 years before moving to Los Angeles, where he began his acting career. He met bandmate Braeden Lemasters after their mothers met online. The two were introduced to each other and became close friends. They soon met Cole Preston and Zack Mendenhall in a children's music program and started their own band named the Feaver, which later became Wallows.

== Career ==
=== Acting ===
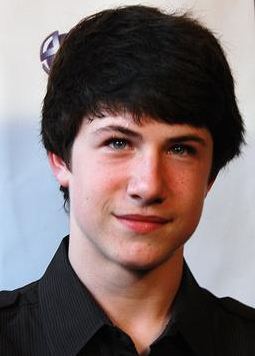
Minnette at the premiere of Let Me In in 2010

Minnette's first role was a single episode of Drake & Josh. He later appeared in the NBC original film The Year Without a Santa Claus, as an unnamed character in Fred Claus, as Todd Lyons in the film The Clique, and as Noah Framm in Snow Buddies. Notable television roles of Minnette's include the young version of the character Michael Scofield on Prison Break and character Clay Norman on Saving Grace. He played a bully named Kenny in Let Me In, released in October 2010.

He also played a role as Jerry Grant Jr. on ABC's Scandal as the son of the president of the United States. Minnette has also appeared in several commercials and in four episodes of Lost as Jack's son in the sideways timeline. Minnette appeared in "The Crow & the Butterfly" video from the rock group Shinedown.

In 2014, Minnette appeared in the comedy film Alexander and the Terrible, Horrible, No Good, Very Bad Day as Anthony Cooper, first child of the Cooper children and the elder brother of the titular character. The film is based on Judith Viorst’s 1972 children's book of the same name. In the following year, Minnette co-starred in the film Goosebumps, based on the R. L. Stine's children's horror book series of the same name. The film was a commercial success and garnered generally positive reviews from critics, grossing over $158 million.

In 2016, Minnette starred in the horror film Don't Breathe which was directed by Fede Álvarez. A sleeper hit, Don't Breathe received critical acclaim and grossed over $156 million.

From 2017, Minnette began starring in the Netflix teen drama television series 13 Reasons Why, an adaptation of the 2007 novel of the same name, as Clay Jensen. His portrayal won him critical praise; The Hollywood Reporter wrote: "Minnette is so dedicated to playing despondent that the relief and pleasure in brief scenes of flirty banter between Hannah and Clay is palpable". He was in the show for four seasons until it ended in 2020. He also starred in the Netflix film The Open House, which premiered in January 2018.

In September 2020, Minnette was cast as Wes Hicks in the fifth Scream film, which was directed by Matt Bettinelli-Olpin and Tyler Gillett. The film was released on January 14, 2022.

On August 3, 2021, it was announced that Minnette had been cast as Tyler Shultz, the grandson of George Shultz in the Hulu's limited series The Dropout.

In May 2024, during an interview with Zach Sang, Minnette revealed that he took a break from acting to focus more on music. The reason that he stated was acting had "started to feel like just a job" and less like a creative endeavour; however, he admitted that he had found inspiration for acting again, saying, "I do feel like I have something to give, and that's probably acting".

=== Music ===
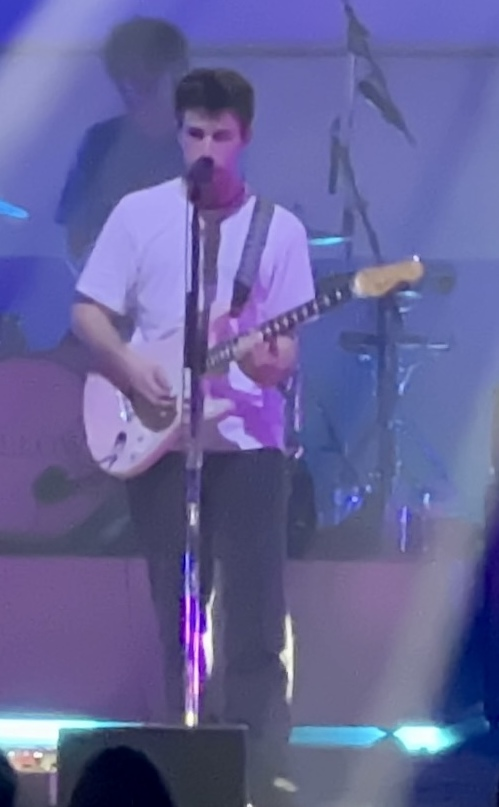
Minnette performing with Wallows in 2022

Minnette is the singer, rhythm guitarist, and bassist in the band Wallows, with Cole Preston (drums) and Braeden Lemasters (singer, guitar). Before 2017, they were known as the Feaver and later the Narwhals. They performed at Summer Meltdown, a concert for autism awareness in 2010 and won a battle of the bands contest the same year, sponsored by 98.7 FM. They played at Vans Warped Tour 2011 and have since performed at many Los Angeles venues including the Roxy Theatre and Whisky a Go Go. Their song "Bleeding Man" was used in the promo for season 2 of R.L. Stine's The Haunting Hour.

Throughout 2017, they released four singles on Apple Music and Spotify: "Pleaser", "Sun Tan", "Uncomfortable" and "Pulling Leaves Off Trees". In 2018, they released their debut EP Spring, including singles "Pictures of Girls" and "These Days". They performed "Pictures of Girls" on The Late Late Show with James Corden on May 8, 2018. Their debut album, Nothing Happens, was released in March 2019. In 2020, they released their second EP Remote, including singles "Nobody Gets Me (Like You)" and "Virtual Aerobics".

In March 2022, the band released their sophomore album Tell Me That It's Over. Minnette performed with Wallows at Coachella that summer. In 2024, they released their third studio album, Model.

== Filmography ==
=== Film ===
Year	Title	Role	Notes
2007	Game of Life	Billy	Direct-to-video film
2007	Fred Claus	Orphanage kid	
2008	Snow Buddies	Noah Framm	Direct-to-video film
2008	The Clique	Todd Lyons	Direct-to-video film
2010	Let Me In	Kenny	
2013	Labor Day	16-year-old Henry Wheeler	
2013	Prisoners	Ralph Dover	
2014	Alexander and the Terrible, Horrible, No Good, Very Bad Day	Anthony Cooper	
2015	Goosebumps	Zach Cooper	
2016	Don't Breathe	Alex	
2017	The Disaster Artist	Guy on cell phone	Deleted scene
2018	The Open House	Logan Wallace	
2022	Scream	Wes Hicks	

=== Television ===
Year	Title	Role	Notes
2005	Drake & Josh	Jeffrey	Episode: "The Demonator"
2005	Two and a Half Men	Young Charlie Harper	Episode: "I Always Wanted a Shaved Monkey"
2005–2006	Prison Break	Young Michael Scofield	Recurring role (seasons 1–2)
2006	Mad TV	Billy	Season 11, episode 18
2006	The Year Without a Santa Claus	Iggy Thistlewhite	Television film
2007	Grey's Anatomy	Ryan (boy with no ears)	Episode: "Haunt You Every Day"
2007–2010	Saving Grace	Clay Norman	Main role
2008	Ghost Whisperer	Pierce Wilkins	Episode: "Stranglehold"
2008	Rules of Engagement	Nicky	Episode: "Buyer's Remorse"
2008	The Mentalist	Frankie O'Keefe	Episode: "Red Hair and Silver Tape"
2009	Supernatural	Danny Carter	Episode: "Family Remains"
2010	Lost	David Shephard	4 episodes
2010	Medium	Cameron	Episode: "Bring Your Daughter to Work Day"
2010–2011	Men of a Certain Age	Reed	4 episodes
2011	Lie to Me	Noah	Episode: "Rebound"
2011	Against the Wall	Ryan Spencer	Episode: "Obsessed and Unwanted"
2011	The Haunting Hour: The Series	Corey	Episode: "Brush with Madness"
2012	Awake	Rex Britten	Main role
2012	Law & Order: Special Victims Unit	Luca Gabardelli	Episode: "Learning Curve"
2012	Major Crimes	Avi Strauss	Episode: "The Ecstasy and the Agony"
2013	Nikita	Stefan Tasarov	Episode: "Reunion"
2013	Save Me	Ben Tompkins	Episode: "The Book of Beth"
2013	The Haunting Hour: The Series	Chad	Episode: "Funhouse"
2014	Agents of S.H.I.E.L.D.	Donnie Gill	Episodes: "Seeds", "Making Friends and Influencing People"
2014	Scandal	Fitzgerald "Jerry" Jr.	Recurring role (seasons 3–4)
2017–2020	13 Reasons Why	Clay Jensen	Main role
2018, 2019	The Late Late Show with James Corden	Himself	Performing alongside his band Wallows
2019	The Tonight Show Starring Jimmy Fallon	Himself	Performing alongside his band Wallows
2020	Jimmy Kimmel Live!	Himself	Performing alongside his band Wallows
2022	The Dropout	Tyler Shultz	Miniseries

== Awards and nominations ==
Year	Award	Category	Work	Result	Refs
2008	Young Artist Awards	Best Performance in a TV Series – Young Actor Age Ten or Younger	Saving Grace	Won	
2009	Young Artist Awards	Best Performance in a TV Series – Guest Starring Young Actor	The Mentalist	Nominated	
2009	Young Artist Awards	Best Performance in a TV Series – Recurring Young Actor	Saving Grace	Nominated	
2011	Young Artist Awards	Best Performance in a Feature Film – Supporting Young Actor	Let Me In	Nominated	
2011	Young Artist Awards	Best Performance in a Feature Film – Young Ensemble Cast	Let Me In	Nominated	
2011	Young Artist Awards	Best Performance in a TV Series – Guest Starring Young Actor 14–17	Medium	Won	
2011	Young Artist Awards	Best Performance in a TV Series – Recurring Young Actor	Lost	Nominated	
2013	National Board of Review Awards	Best Acting by an Ensemble	Prisoners	Won	
2015	Young Artist Awards	Best Performance in a Feature Film – Young Ensemble Cast	Alexander and the Terrible, Horrible, No Good, Very Bad Day	Nominated	
