= Nothing Happens =

Studio album by Wallows
- Released: March 22, 2019
- Recorded: April – November 2018
- Genre: Indie pop; indie rock
- Length: 38:47
- Label: Atlantic
- Producer: John Congleton

Wallows chronology
Spring (2018)	Nothing Happens (2019)	Remote (2020)

Singles from Nothing Happens
- 1. "Are You Bored Yet?" Released: February 1, 2019; 2. "Scrawny" Released: February 18, 2019; 3. "Sidelines" Released: March 8, 2019; 4. "Treacherous Doctor" Released: September 30, 2019; 5. "Remember When" Released: January 17, 2020

Nothing Happens is the debut studio album by American band Wallows. It was released on March 22, 2019, through Atlantic Records.

== Background ==
Dylan Minnette, Cole Preston, and Braeden Lemasters had been making music together long before the release of Nothing Happens. From meeting in a music class, the three boys grew into close friends and musical partners. Finally, in 2017, going by the name Wallows, the group put out plenty of music leading up to their debut album.

On February 1, 2019, Wallows released the album's first single "Are You Bored Yet?", featuring Clairo. A subsequent music video was also released the same day with a cameo from Noah Centineo. The album's second single "Scrawny" was released on February 18, 2019, whilst the third single "Sidelines" was released on March 8, 2019. "Scrawny"s music video was released alongside the album on March 22, 2019.

Nothing Happens was written and produced by Braeden Lemasters (guitar and vocals), Cole Preston (guitar and drums), Dylan Minnette (guitar and vocals), and along with Grammy winner John Congleton. Dylan Minnette was previously known for starring in the Netflix series 13 Reasons Why. Shortly after the season aired, Dylan announced his band "Wallows" and their first single, titled "Pleaser".

Wallows' began working on Nothing Happens in 2018, shortly after releasing their first EP Spring. Before 2017, Wallows were known as different band names, "The Feaver" and "The Narwhals".

In an interview by "Recording Academy", the band members discuss how they felt about finishing the album. Lemasters describes their repertoire from their first single, until the last song on Nothing Happens, represents a chapter of their lives and how they are looking forward to exploring new ways of expression with upcoming music.

== Release and promotion ==
Nothing Happens (on vinyl, CD, digital streaming and download) was released by Atlantic Records. In support of their debut album, on February 19, Wallows performed "Are You Bored Yet?", featuring Clairo, on The Tonight Show Starring Jimmy Fallon. The day before the album's release, on March 21, Wallows had a full interview with Atwood Magazine, describing the process of writing the album. The release of their album came along with a music video for the song "Scrawny". This video has been described as "comical", because it showcases the band in a boxing match. The video also served the purpose of gaining hype for the album because the song and music video are upbeat, and stand out from the rest of the album. In April 2019, Wallows performed at Coachella Valley Music and Arts Festival in Indio, California for their very first time. The album was promoted on their 2019-2020 tour, which was cut short due to the 2020 COVID-19 pandemic. Due to the pandemic shutting down their tour, they continued to find ways to promote their band and give fans what they wanted. Wallows filmed four shows while following COVID-safe procedures that allowed fans to watch Wallows performances from home. These performances were filmed at the Roxy Theatre (West Hollywood) to give fans a feeling of normalcy during uncertain times.

== Critical reception ==
Professional ratings
Review scores
Source	Rating
AllMusic	3.5/5 stars
Rock Cellar Magazine	Positive
Under the Radar	5/10 stars

Nothing Happens received generally positive reviews by contemporary music critics. Gisselle Pernett, writing for Rock Cellar Magazine, found the album a mixture of dance-worthy and nostalgic songs. Olivia Kesling of The Alternative regarded the album as entertaining, with an infectious energy. Meanwhile, Matt Raven of Under the Radar described the musical arrangements similar to The Shins and Death Cab for Cutie. Marcy Donelson said for AllMusic that they showed their ability to have lyrical depth in most of their tracks. The song "Scrawny" was criticized for having a more self-deprecating irony to it with simple, repetitive lyrics.

== Track listing ==
All tracks are written by Dylan Minnette, Cole Preston, and Braeden Lemasters, except where noted.

Nothing Happens – Standard edition
No.	Title	Writer(s)	Length
1.	"Only Friend"		3:01
2.	"Treacherous Doctor"		2:43
3.	"Sidelines"		3:00
4.	"Are You Bored Yet?" (featuring Clairo)	Minnette; Preston; Lemasters; Claire Cotrill	2:58
5.	"Scrawny"		2:46
6.	"Ice Cold Pool"		3:57
7.	"Worlds Apart"		4:14
8.	"What You Like"		3:21
9.	"Remember When"		2:35
10.	"I'm Full"		3:42
11.	"Do Not Wait"		6:30
Total length:			38:47

Nothing Happens – 5th Anniversary Edition
No.	Title	Writer(s)	Length
1.	"Only Friend"		3:01
2.	"Treacherous Doctor"		2:43
3.	"Sidelines"		3:00
4.	"Are You Bored Yet?" (featuring Clairo)	Minnette; Preston; Lemasters; Claire Cotrill	2:58
5.	"Scrawny"		2:46
6.	"Trust Fall"		3:21
7.	"Underneath the Streetlights in the Winter Outside Your House"		1:10
8.	"Ice Cold Pool"		3:57
9.	"Bad Remake"		3:08
10.	"Worlds Apart - Extended Ending"		4:30
11.	"What You Like"		3:21
12.	"Just Like a Movie"		4:07
13.	"Remember When"		2:35
14.	"I'm Full"		3:42
15.	"Do Not Wait"		6:30
Total length:			50:49

== Personnel ==
- Dylan Minnette - vocals, bass guitar, rhythm guitar, keyboard
- Cole Preston - piano, guitar, vocals, drums, keyboard
- Braeden Lemasters - lead guitar, vocals, bass guitar

== Charts ==
Chart (2019)	Peak position
US Billboard 200	75
US Top Alternative Albums (Billboard)	8
US Top Rock Albums (Billboard)	13
