= Soden =

Soden may refer to:

== Place names ==
- Bad Soden, town and spa in the Main-Taunus-Kreis, Hessen, Germany
- Bad Soden-Salmünster, town in the Main-Kinzig district, in Hesse, Germany
- Bad Sooden-Allendorf, town in the Werra-Meißner-Kreis in Hesse, Germany

== People ==
- Arthur Soden (1843–1925), American executive in Major League Baseball
- Frank Ormond Soden (1895–1961), British First World War flying ace
- Frederick Soden (1846–1877), English cricketer
- Gordon Ross-Soden (1888 –1931), Australian rules footballer
- Harry Ross-Soden (1886–1944), Australian rower
- Hermann von Soden (1852–1914), German Biblical scholar, minister, professor of divinity, and textual theorist
- Julius von Soden (1846–1921), German colonial administrator and politician
- Mark Soden (born 1968), Australian former rugby league footballer
- Maura Soden (born 1955), American actress and producer
- Ray Soden (1925–2012, American politician
- Robert Soden (born 1955), English artist and painter
- William Soden Hastings (1798–1842), United States Representative from Massachusetts
- Wolfram von Soden (1908–1996), German Assyriologist
