= Ricky's Tacos =

- Awake episode
- Tricia tries to make Ally confess to her father John sexually assaulting her and her sister, who had committed suicide because of it.
- Episode no.: Season 1 Episode 7
- Directed by: Adam Davidson
- Story by: Kyle Killen
- Teleplay by: Howard Gordon; Evan Katz
- Production code: 1ATR05
- Original air date: April 12, 2012
- Running time: 43 minutes

Guest appearances
- Laura Innes as Tricia Harper; Mark Harelik as Carl Kessel; Kevin Weisman as Ed Hawkins (uncredited); Chris McGarry as Dr. Banks; Lombardo Boyar as Jose Cabrera; Christopher Cousins as John Ferris; Charley Koontz as Tim Wax; Chris Brochu as Chris Chapman; Brighid Fleming as Ally Ferris; Gary Perez as John's Lawyer; Benjamin Burdick as Officer; Deanna Douglas as Nell; Loren Lester as Murray; Natacha Itzel as Elena; Kevin Will as Doyle; Barrett Shuler as Attendant; Maura Soden as Heather Seiple; Debbie Kagy as Uniformed Cop

Episode chronology
← Previous "That's Not My Penguin"	Next → "Nightswimming"

"Ricky's Tacos" is the seventh episode of the American television police procedural supernatural drama Awake. It originally aired on NBC on April 12, 2012. The teleplay of the episode was written by executive producer Howard Gordon and Evan Katz, from a story by series creator Kyle Killen; the episode was directed by Adam Davidson. "Ricky's Tacos" earned a Nielsen rating of 0.9, being watched by 2.68 million viewers in its initial broadcast. The episode has generally received positive reviews, with critics commenting on its storylines.

The show centers on Michael Britten (Jason Isaacs), a detective living in two separate realities after a car accident. In one reality, in which he wears a red wristband, his wife Hannah Britten (Laura Allen) survived the accident, and in another reality, in which he wears a green wristband, his son Rex Britten (Dylan Minnette) survived. In this episode, Britten goes to Ricky's Tacos, where the voice at the drive-thru says that he cannot go to Portland, and "it all starts with the Westfield case". However, he fails to find anything unusual about the case. Later, Britten and Bird (Steve Harris) deal with a case with a girl who had died off a hotel ledge. Soon after, they find out that, the father John Ferris (Christopher Cousins) had been sexually assaulting her and her younger daughter. This had caused the daughter to get pregnant, and she had looked for a good guy to raise her, before she committed suicide, due to this. Meanwhile, in the "red reality", Britten and Efrem Vega (Wilmer Valderrama) deal with a case with a dead man Pablo. Later, they find out that his brother Jose Cabrera (Lombardo Boyar) had killed him and took his identity. Captain Tricia Harper (Laura Innes) and Captain Carl Kessel (Mark Harelik) discuss Britten's accident.

"Ricky's Tacos" continued key thematic elements to the series that were originally introduced in "The Little Guy", the second episode of the series. The themes of the episode were criticized by The A.V. Club and HitFix.

== Plot ==
Michael Britten (Jason Isaacs) is with his wife Hannah (Laura Allen) in the "red reality" talking to a real estate agent (Maura Soden) about selling their house and moving to Oregon. Later, Britten stops at Ricky's Tacos to order at the drive thru speaker, he hears the attendant (Barrett Shuler) say Britten cannot move until he solves the Westfield case. However, when Michael replies, the attendant has no idea what Britten is talking about. Britten drives to the Westfield Distribution Center and discovers that it is abandoned. He talks to the owner (Loren Lester), and explains that he was investigating a case there four months ago. The owner says that he is now leasing out the space and he does not know where the previous distribution owners went. While Britten is searching, he finds a Ricky's Tacos bag in the unit. In the "green reality", he speaks to Dr. Judith Evans (Cherry Jones), who claims that his subconscious is trying to stop their move to Oregon. Britten states that there was a case shortly before the accident. At the station, Britten speaks to Bird (Steve Harris) about the case. Britten starts to go to the records room. However, the detectives are sent on a new case. Sabrina Ferris jumped to her death from a hotel room, and landed on a car. They speak to Tim Wax (Charley Koontz), who witnessed the jump. He explains that they were lab partners and Sabrina invited him over to study and he did, and then they had sex, and shortly after, Sabrina jumped off the ledge. Sabrina's father John (Christopher Cousins) tries to attack Wax, automatically assuming that he pushed her. Back at the station, Dr. Banks (Chris McGarry) warns Bird and Britten that they found signs of rape. Britten talks to Tim in the interrogation room, where Tim claimed that he did not want to hurt her.

After transferring into the "red reality", Britten speaks to Captain Tricia Harper (Laura Innes) about the storage unit, however she wants him to work on cases that have not been closed. Efrem Vega (Wilmer Valderrama) and Britten investigate at a hotel site that was being cleared for new construction. The workers found a man buried in the foundation. Banks shows them the site and the corpse, which has a fractured skull. Banks has managed to identify the victim as Pablo Cabrera. Britten speaks to his brother Jose (Lombardo Boyar), and notices a tattoo of the college logo of Tioga College in the other reality, on Jose's arm. Back in the "green reality", Britten goes to the impound lot and finds the parking pass with the tiger logo. At the station, he tells Bird that it was stamped two days ago and Sabrina drove 300 miles there and back without telling anyone. Britten decides to drive to San Diego, and at the college, Michael goes the room of the ex, Chris Chapman (Chris Brochu) to break the news, and Chapman noted that Sabrina had a diary where she kept all personal informations. Britten and Bird observe that she had a pregnancy to hide. In the "red reality", Michael drives back to Westfield Distribution and discovers that the doors are locked to look for more evidence, unaware that Detective Ed Hawkins (Kevin Weisman) is watching him. Hawkins notifies Captain Carl Kessel (Mark Harelik), and Kessel phones Harper to speak about it. Vega and Britten track down one of the foremen from three months ago, but does not recognize Pablo.

In the "green reality", Britten goes to the distribution center, who tells him exactly what he said in the "green reality". Later, Bird calls to tell Michael that the autopsy report shows that Sabrina was four weeks pregnant when she killed herself. The partners go to see John at his home and explain that new information has come up revealing that Sabrina was pregnant. The father takes them to the bedroom to find the diaries and Michael notices something in a dresser. He asks John to get him a glass of water and then shows Bird how the dresser was moved to barricade the door. When John comes back with water, Britten takes him to the station. John had sexually molested her daughters. When she became pregnant, she tried to use Chris and then Tim to cover the pregnancy, but finally killed herself out of shame. To find evidence, Harper meets with Ally (Brighid Fleming) to get her to confess. She does confess, and John is led away and Wax is released from prison. In the "red reality", Britten realizes that Jose had a tattoo of a tiger put over his original tattoo of a devil. Michael and Vega go back to Jose's home and hear him run out the back. They give chase and Michael goes after him while Vega goes around and gets ahead to capture him. At the station, Britten says that Jose is really Pablo, due to the evidence, and Jose admits it. Britten tells Harper that he is moving to Oregon, and Harper calls Kessel to tell him that Britten resigned.

== Production ==
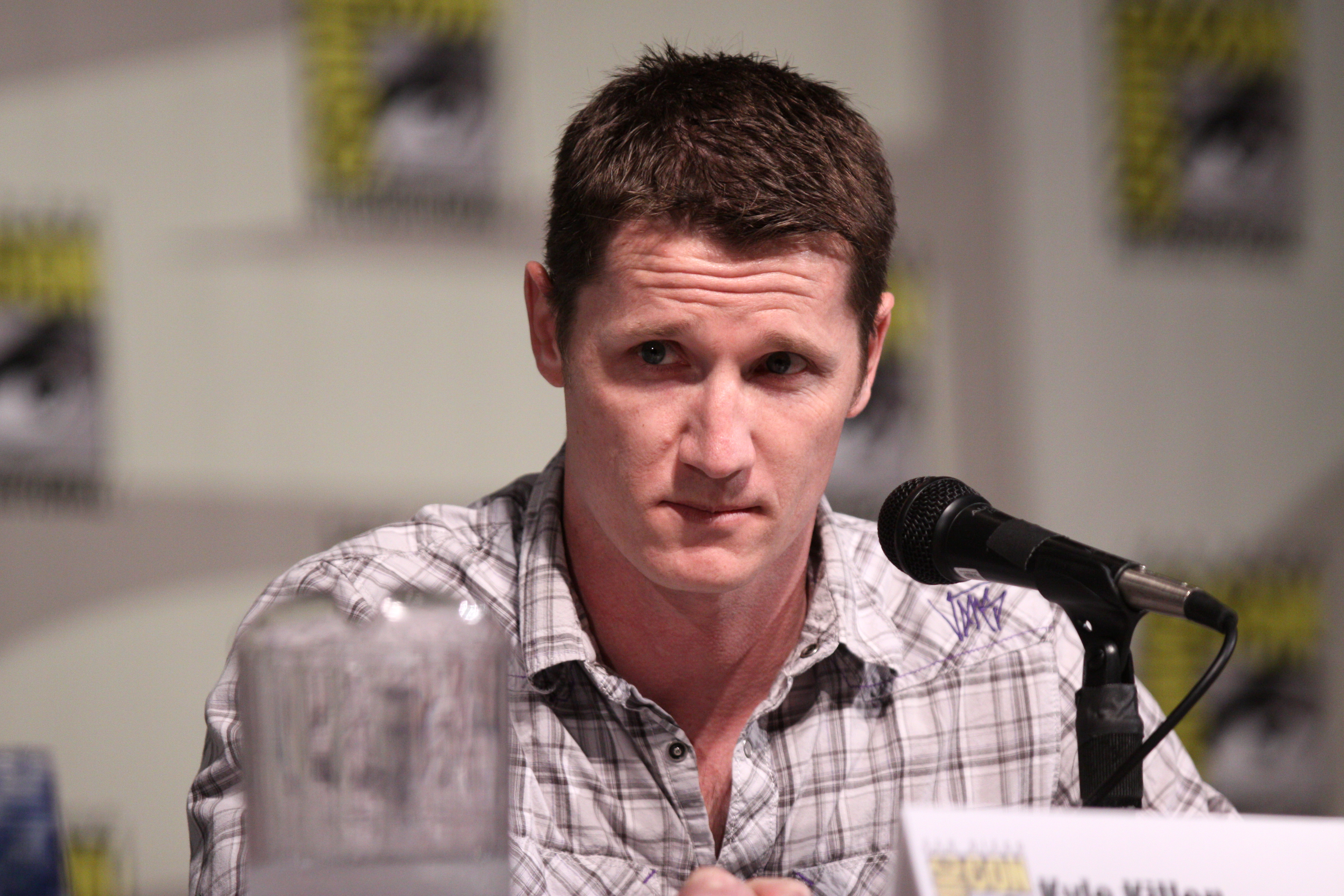
Series creator Kyle Killen wrote the episode's story.

The teleplay of the episode was written by executive producer Howard Gordon and Evan Katz, from a story by series creator Kyle Killen; the episode was directed by Adam Davidson. It was Gordon and Katz's second credit, and Killen's fourth writing credit in the series; it was Davidson's first credit. The installment is rated TV-14 on television in the United States.

== Themes ==
Although it did not directly impact the ongoing storyline of Awake, "Ricky's Tacos" continued key thematic elements to the series that were originally introduced in "The Little Guy", the second episode, with a fast food attendant telling Britten that he cannot go to Oregon due to the Westfield case, and Kessel and Harper discussing their involvement, like in "The Little Guy". The A.V. Club claimed that "Ricky's Tacos" introduces a "deeper connection to our hero via some unexplained conspiracy". According to The A.V. Club, there was "conspiracy talk" in the episode that was previous in "The Little Guy". Due to this, they stated that the show is being into "integrated", with tons of cases in both realities. He thought that it is like "two different series working at once".

Alan Sepinwall of HitFix observed that the episode is devoting "time to establishing Harper as more than just a mysterious conspirator", and claimed that "the show probably fumbled things by revealing both the existence of the conspiracy and Harper's role in it so early, rather than letting us get to know her before smacking us in the gut with the discovery."

== Broadcast and reception ==
"Ricky's Tacos" originally aired on NBC on April 12, 2012. The episode's initial broadcast was viewed by approximately 2.68 million viewers. "Ricky's Tacos" earned a Nielsen rating of 0.9, with a 2 share, meaning that roughly 0.9 percent of all television-equipped households, and 2 percent of households watching television, were tuned in to the episode. In the United Kingdom, the episode was first broadcast on Sky Atlantic on June 15, 2012, and obtained 223,000 viewers, making it the third most-viewed program for the channel behind Hit & Miss and Smash.

"Ricky's Tacos" has generally received positive reviews from television critics.
