= Gordon Ross =

Gordon Ross may refer to:

- Gordon Ross (rugby union) (born 1978), British rugby union footballer
- Gordon Ross (writer) (1918–1985), British sports writer
- J. Gordon Ross (1891–1972), Canadian member of Parliament
- Gordon Ross (Australian footballer) (1878–1952), Australian rules footballer for Carlton
- Gordon Ross (1930-1995), American actor, younger brother of Marion Ross

== See also ==
- Gordon Ross-Soden (1888–1931), Australian rules footballer for Essendon
