= Education in Richmond, Virginia =

These are multiple education systems in Richmond, Virginia.

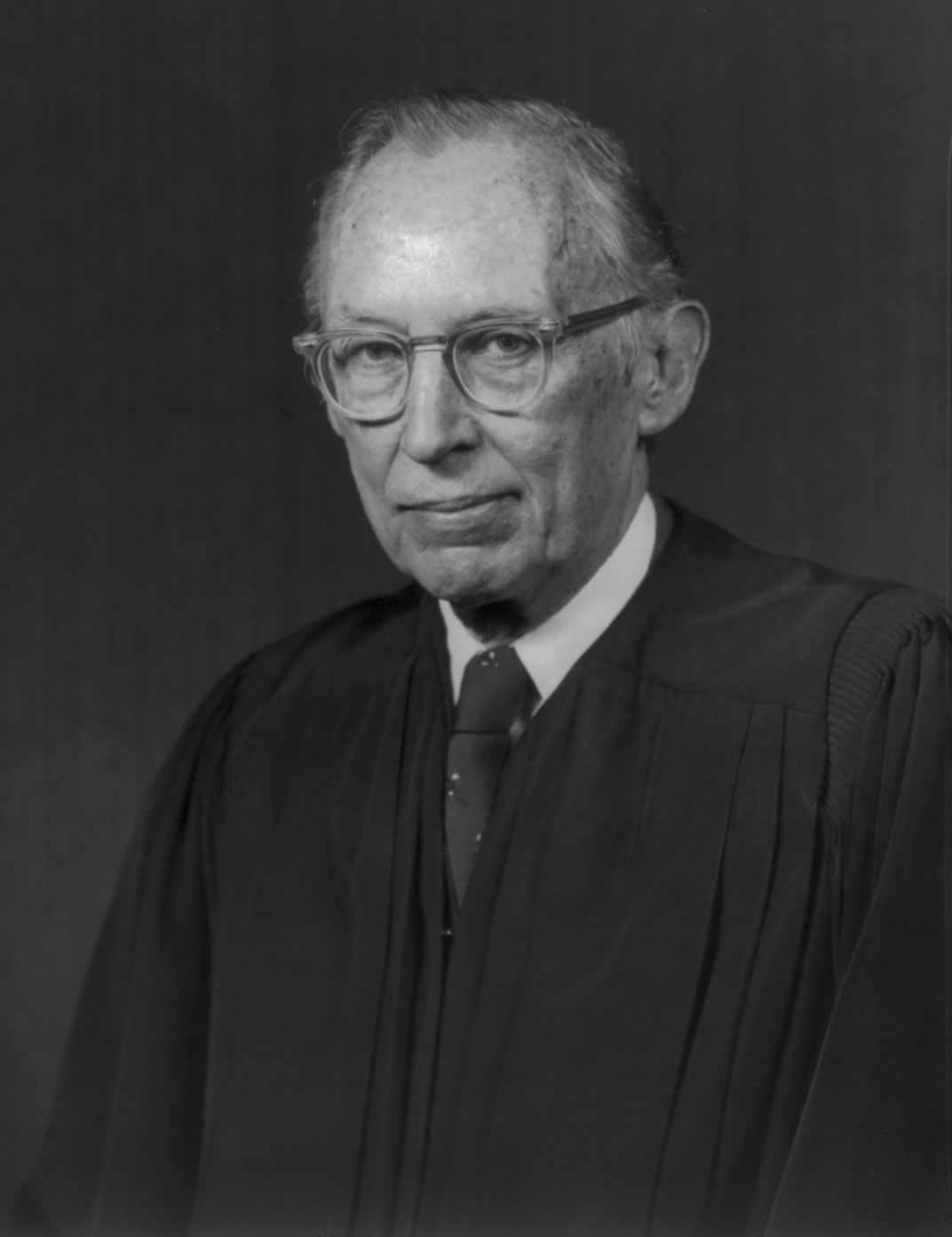
Hon. Lewis F. Powell, Jr.

Historically, the most important person who advanced primary and secondary education in the area was future Supreme Court of the United States Associate Justice Lewis F. Powell, Jr., who served as president of Richmond's school district.

== Elementary and secondary schools ==
The Richmond City Public Schools system comprises 5 high schools, 9 middle schools, 28 elementary schools, and 9 special-purpose/preschools.

=== 21st Century ===
In a 2009 Richmond Times-Dispatch article, titled "Dropping In", it was declared that the high school dropout rate was "hovering" at around 15 percent, a number that the city is now working to improve on. Despite their efforts, the "Four Year Cohort Dropout Rate" has hovered between 15% and 24% between 2017 and 2024.

In 2011, Mayor Dwight C. Jones announced the replacement of Broad Rock Elementary, Oak Grove Elementary, and Huguenot High schools in the South Richmond district, along with the replacement of Martin Luther King Jr. Middle in the East End district. Construction of elementary school replacements began, but Huguenot remains to be replaced. The elementary schools are ranked highly among urban area school districts, while the middle and high schools are not as positively viewed.

In December 2023, the Virginia board of education backed a new funding formula for schools in the Commonwealth that would increase funding for Richmond schools.

=== High schools ===
- Armstrong High School
- Huguenot High School
- Thomas Jefferson High School
- John Marshall High School
- Richmond High School for the Arts.

== Private schools and advanced schools ==
There are also a number of private schools in the city, including Saint Gertrude High School, founded in 1922. It is one of Richmond's oldest functioning private schools. Also notable are the special purpose (or advanced) schools, such as the notable magnet school Maggie L. Walker Governor's School for Government and International Studies, a school that receives a little over 2000 submissions a year. It is among the leading high schools in the nation, and maintains an SAT score average of 2047, well over the national mean. The International Baccalaureate programs are also located in many schools throughout the metro region, with all three stages of the IB (Primary Years Programme, Middle Years Programme, and Diploma Programme) being offered at elementary, middle, and high schools abroad. Examples include Three Chopt Elementary and Moody Middle in Henrico, and Hanover High School, in Hanover.

== Universities and colleges ==
There are several universities known nationwide, and some only locally known. Most notable are the region's two Division I schools, the University of Richmond, and Virginia Commonwealth University, or as it is often abbreviated, "VCU". The former is a small, suburban private institution, while the latter is a public, Carnegie-certified research university, noted for its "high research levels". It sits on two campuses, the Monroe Park campus, and the MCV campus. VCU has over 32,000 students, making it the largest university in the Commonwealth in terms of number of students. Its athletics division, collectively known as the VCU Rams, garnered national attention when the men's basketball team reached the 2011 NCAA Final Four, the semifinals of the college basketball division. Here is a complete list of Richmond's colleges and universities:

- Virginia Commonwealth University
- University of Richmond
- Virginia Union University
- Randolph Macon College (located in nearby Ashland)
- Virginia State University (located in nearby Petersburg)
