= Malcolm in the Middle season 5 =

Malcolm in the Middle
- Season 5
- DVD cover
- Starring: Jane Kaczmarek; Bryan Cranston; Christopher Masterson; Justin Berfield; Erik Per Sullivan; Frankie Muniz
- No. of episodes: 22

Release
- Original network: Fox
- Original release: November 2, 2003 – May 23, 2004

Season chronology
- ← Previous; Season 4 Next → Season 6

The fifth season of Malcolm in the Middle premiered on November 2, 2003, on Fox, and ended on May 23, 2004, with a total of 22 episodes. Frankie Muniz stars as the title character Malcolm, and he is joined by Jane Kaczmarek, Bryan Cranston, Christopher Kennedy Masterson, Justin Berfield and Erik Per Sullivan.

== Cast and characters ==
=== Main ===
- Jane Kaczmarek as Lois
- Bryan Cranston as Hal
- Christopher Kennedy Masterson as Francis
- Justin Berfield as Reese
- Erik Per Sullivan as Dewey
- Frankie Muniz as Malcolm

=== Recurring ===
- Craig Lamar Traylor as Stevie Kenarban
- David Anthony Higgins as Craig Feldspar
- Julie Hagerty as Polly
- Kenneth Mars as Otto
- Emy Coligado as Piama
- Meagen Fay as Gretchen

=== Guest stars ===
- David Cassidy as Boone Vincent ("Vegas")
- Jeffrey Anderson-Gunter as Concert Security Guy ("Vegas")
- Teresa Ganzel as Crystal ("Vegas")
- Caitlin Crosby as Joanne ("Watching the Baby")
- Kat Graham as Val ("Watching the Baby")
- Alessandra Torresani as Kirsten ("Thanksgiving")
- Don McManus as Charles Cutler ("Malcolm Films Reese")
- Todd Stashwick as Nate ("Malcolm's Job")
- Holmes Osborne as Mr. Young ("Malcolm's Job")
- Ted Rooney as Fritz ("Christmas Trees")
- Casey Sander as Father Murphy ("Christmas Trees")
- Vic Polizos as Father McCluskey ("Christmas Trees")
- Mark L. Taylor as Phil ("Christmas Trees")
- Tom Towles as Ethan ("Christmas Trees")
- Larry Hankin as Luther ("Christmas Trees")
- Jonathan Schmock as Nathan ("Christmas Trees")
- John Marshall Jones as Cop ("Christmas Trees")
- Max Van Ville as Hans ("Christmas Trees")
- Beverly Polcyn as Old Lady Employee ("Christmas Trees")
- Mark Moses as Richard ("Block Party")
- Lorenzo James Henrie as Normal Boy ("Block Party")
- Hallie Todd as Miss Shaw ("Dirty Magazine")
- Lori Beth Denberg as Ronnie ("Dirty Magazine")
- Nikki Crawford as Nell ("Dirty Magazine")
- Kurtwood Smith as Principal Block ("Dirty Magazine")
- Robert Joy as Danny ("Hot Tub")
- James Hong as Mr. Li ("Ida's Boyfriend")
- Patrick Bristow as Phillip ("Ida's Boyfriend")
- Christie Lynn Smith as Angela ("Ida's Boyfriend")
- Michael Gaston as Mel ("Softball")
- Laurie Metcalf as Susan ("Lois' Sister")
- Abigail Mavity as Meagan ("Lois' Sister")
- Lyndsy Fonseca as Olivia ("Lois' Sister")
- Kate Lang Johnson as Katie ("Lois' Sister")
- Hayley Erin as Buttercup #1 ("Lois' Sister")
- Sherman Howard as Ivan Pozefsky ("Malcolm Dates a Family")
- Sara Paxton as Angela Pozefsky ("Malcolm Dates a Family")
- Eddie Shin as Jordan ("Malcolm Dates a Family")
- Helen Slayton-Hughes as Nana ("Malcolm Dates a Family")
- Jack McGee as Coach Oleski ("Reese's Apartment")
- Patricia Belcher as Dr. Lucille Armstrong ("Reese's Apartment")
- Stephanie Lemelin as Christie ("Malcolm Visits College")
- Monique Coleman as Andrea ("Malcolm Visits College")
- Jamie Renée Smith as Paula ("Malcolm Visits College")
- Reggie Jackson as Himself ("Polly in the Middle")
- Tricia O'Kelley as Mrs. Walsh ("Dewey's Special Class")
- Matt Malloy as Mr. Sheridan ("Dewey's Special Class")
- Amy Castle as Hayley ("Dewey's Special Class")
- Ayla Kell as Kylie ("Dewey's Special Class")
- Cameron Monaghan as Chad ("Dewey's Special Class")
- Raven Goodwin as Special Kid #2 ("Dewey's Special Class")
- Regan Burns as Middle Aged Man ("Experiment")
- Betty White as Sylvia ("Victor's Other Family")
- Adam Wylie as Scott ("Victor's Other Family")
- Maura Soden as Roberta ("Victor's Other Family")
- Tom Virtue as Peter Dietrich ("Victor's Other Family")
- Erik King as Agent Stone ("Reese Joins the Army: Part 1")
- Paul Gleason as Mystery Man ("Reese Joins the Army: Parts 1 & 2")
- Michael Milhoan as Sergeant McManus ("Reese Joins the Army: Part 2")
- Nate Torrence as Private Turner ("Reese Joins the Army: Part 2")
- Dennis Cockrum as Lieutenant Sortino ("Reese Joins the Army: Part 2")

== Episodes ==
Season 5 episodes
No. overall	No. in season	Title	Directed by	Written by	Original release date	Prod. code	U.S. viewers (millions)
86	1	"Vegas"	Bryan Cranston	Michael Glouberman & Andrew Orenstein	November 2, 2003	06-03-501	10.26
In the cold open, Jamie is revealed to be a boy. The family travels to Las Vegas, where Reese and Dewey show an obese rabbit at a competition, Hal is convinced he has had a prophetic dream about winning at a slot machine, and Lois goes backstage with her favorite singer Boone Vincent (David Cassidy). Meanwhile, Francis has been neglecting his chores at the ranch, capping off by falling into and being trapped with Otto in a well he was supposed to have fixed.
87	2	"Watching the Baby"	Levie Isaacks	Alex Reid	November 9, 2003	06-03-502	9.63
Attractive, popular girls: Joanne (Caitlin Crosby), Kelly (Michelle Durham) and Val (Kat Graham), want to be seen with Reese, Malcolm, and Stevie as revenge on their boyfriends, so the boys stick Dewey with babysitting Jamie. Dewey tells Jamie an elaborate story in which their parents are secretly wealthy and have a hidden "secret good house" in their closet, where they also own a robotic version of Francis as a slave. Forced to work at the Lucky Aide when he can't pay for Jamie's diapers, Hal discovers that Craig tyrannically lords over the graveyard-shift employees with his night manager position, forcing them to adhere to his rules and wants while he does nothing but reap the benefits, so Hal helps them rebel.
88	3	"Goodbye Kitty"	Jimmy Simons	Gary Murphy & Neil Thompson	November 16, 2003	06-03-503	9.16
When Stevie finds out his mother has divorced his father, he falls into a depression and Malcolm tries to cheer him up -- and ends up in trouble for bullying and mocking Stevie's disability. Lois' high-school diary falls into Reese's backpack and he reads it and becomes infatuated with the diarist – and is horrified to find out her identity. Dewey regresses into babyhood, appalling Lois. Meanwhile, neither Francis nor Otto can bear to kill a horse having a deadly infection; they nearly kill each other in trying.
89	4	"Thanksgiving"	David D'Ovidio	Matthew Carlson	November 23, 2003	06-03-504	10.21
Reese aspires to prepare the perfect Thanksgiving dinner with Hal and Dewey's help. Lois intervenes when Francis and Piama seem headed for divorce. Malcolm goes to a party instead of staying with the family; he spends half the time wondering if Kirstin (Alessandra Torresani) is flirting with him, then gets completely drunk. He arrives home and vomits into the turkey, ruining the dinner and holiday for the family.
90	5	"Malcolm Films Reese"	Levie Isaacks	Dan Kopelman	November 30, 2003	06-03-505	9.18
Malcolm films Reese for a school psychology assignment. He then discovers that he is an unwitting participant in one of Mr. Herkabe's experiments, which portrays him as a sadistic maniac, and he loses Reese's trust. In revenge, he breaks into Herkabe's office to reveal the other students' dirty secrets, including his own. Hal fears he will lose his job when top officials at his company are arrested for embezzlement. Lois' washer and dryer keep breaking down. When Dewey skips school, he starts earning big money working as a street magician. Soon, Hal and Lois find his stash of money, but they assume it's theirs and end up using it to buy a new washer and dryer. A critic named Charles Cutter reviews the Grotto and insults every aspect of the compound, which devastates Otto. When Francis invites Cutter back, they discover his criticism is nothing but verbal abuse and he makes racist statements about Piama, leading Francis and Otto to beat him up. The newspapers trumpet the story, and the Grotto's business booms, because every venue in the state hates Cutter.
91	6	"Malcolm's Job"	Steve Welch	Maggie Bandur	December 7, 2003	06-03-506	8.37
Lois makes Malcolm and Reese get jobs. Reese finds a job at the local slaughterhouse, but Malcolm is forced to work with Lois at the Lucky Aide. Malcolm catches Lois smoking on her break and thinks she is a hypocrite. Hal takes a nursing class run by Polly to spend more time with Jamie, but he and the other dads soon start betting on their babies. Sick of Reese and Malcolm's bullying, Dewey runs away to the ranch to visit his "good brother", Francis.
92	7	"Christmas Trees"	Steve Love	Alex Reid	December 14, 2003	06-03-507	8.71
Hal, Reese, Malcolm, and Dewey go into business selling Christmas trees, but two priests send homeless people to frighten away their customers, since Hal is selling the trees cheaper than the church. Craig is bitten by a squirrel, and Lois orders her co-workers and some homeless people to catch the squirrel to prove that Craig won't need the painful shots. When Otto's family visits the ranch, they seem so much like Francis' family that he gets homesick.
93	8	"Block Party"	Levie Isaacks	Rob Ulin	January 4, 2004	06-03-508	7.45
Returning early from vacation, the family discovers that their neighbors have been celebrating their yearly absence with a block party. Reese and Dewey scheme to make quick cash by letting kids beat up Reese, Hal and Lois join the kielbasa-eating contest, and Malcolm inadvertently aids a burglar. Meanwhile, Francis finds himself assigned to breeding cows, the most disgusting job at the ranch.
94	9	"Dirty Magazine"	Bryan Cranston	Eric Kaplan	January 11, 2004	06-03-509	9.07
Malcolm decides to publish a student's, Ronnie's (Lori Beth Denberg) brilliant story in the school newsletter despite its adult content. Principal Block (Kurtwood Smith) censors him, but Malcolm contacts the ACLU, who forces him not to censor the story. Block cancels all extracurricular activities and only reinstates them when Malcolm calls off the ACLU, but Malcolm gets revenge on Block by publishing his own magazine just outside the school grounds, also containing the story. During work, Hal has a close counter with his new female supervisor, of whom Lois encourages him to continue to flirt with to avoid him getting fired. Reese attempts to manipulate Dewey to prove he is smarter than he is. Meanwhile, Francis tries to teach Otto how to dance for Otto and Gretchen's 25th anniversary, only to realize Otto is a terrible dancer.
95	10	"Hot Tub"	Jimmy Simons	Andy Bobrow	January 25, 2004	06-03-510	8.70
Hal buys a hot tub without telling Lois, but it turns into a swamp when he neglects to clean it. Malcolm finally gets his learner's permit, and gets mixed up in a fight between Polly and her ex-boyfriend. Reese steals Dewey's new friend Noah (Ryan Malgarini), who had actually befriended Dewey to get to Reese to ask him to beat up Noah's bullies. Meanwhile, Manfred Schmidt– former fiancé to Gretchen, former best friend to Otto –visits the ranch. Otto reveals to Francis he actually stole Gretchen away from Manfred.
96	11	"Ida's Boyfriend"	Peter Lauer	Neil Thompson	February 8, 2004	06-03-512	6.39
Ida brings a wealthy Chinese man, Mr. Li (James Hong) to whom she is engaged to the family's house for a dinner, informing them of her plans to fly to Hong Kong to live with him. Malcolm gets his tongue pierced, but it swells up, and he must hide it and the resulting lisp from Lois until the wedding ends. Reese smashes Dewey's new toy in front of him, so Dewey pretends Reese does not exist. Malcolm discovers that Ida is making Mr. Li drink opiate-laced tea to drug him, changing his mood and allowing her to take advantage of him and get his money. Meanwhile at the ranch, Otto hires an acting troop to stage a murder mystery, but the actor's over-dramatic performances are causing more chaos than expected.
97	12	"Softball"	Ken Kwapis	Michael Glouberman	February 15, 2004	06-03-511	7.61
Malcolm joins the Lucky Aide softball team to get away from Lois' wrath on the job – but she has recently become the coach. Francis drives home to prove to Lois that he is not lazy, but Lois refuses to admit that she is wrong until Hal intervenes. Dewey dares Reese to outdo one of Francis' old stunts. Hal panics when he unknowingly applies for a job with what appears to be a top-secret espionage agency, and when he goes back the next day to tell them about his decision to leave, he finds the whole building has disappeared.
98	13	"Lois' Sister"	David D'Ovidio	Gary Murphy	February 22, 2004	06-03-513	10.29
Lois' sister Susan (Laurie Metcalf) visits, bringing generous gifts for the whole family. Suspicious, Lois eventually learns that Susan needs a new kidney and tries to donate one to her, and Susan begrudgingly accepts. Dewey breaks into the garage to use his new cotton candy machine, and Reese and Malcolm joyride in their new Mustang until they are arrested. Meanwhile, Francis "leads" a group of Girl Scouts on a wilderness campout journey through the desert, but they take advantage of him through various pranks.
99	14	"Malcolm Dates a Family"	Steve Welch	Rob Ulin	March 14, 2004	06-03-514	7.61
Lois boycotts Luigi's Pizza, the family's favorite restaurant, after discovering they were forcing them to tip without notice, rendering the boys and Hal unable to eat the pizza without being grounded by Lois. Hal and the boys sneak Luigi's pizzas in the garage. Malcolm gets more involved with his new girlfriend, Angela's, (Sara Paxton) intellectual family, than with her, and she eventually ditches him for ignoring her, forcing the family to kick him out and replace him with Stevie. Meanwhile, the family is watching a TV report about Lois' scheme to close Luigi's when they catch Malcolm there with his friends, which prompts Reese to accidentally confesses that they have been sneaking pizza too. Meanwhile, Otto hires a personal assistant for Francis, only for Francis to end up relying on him for everything, which even includes moving his arms.
100	15	"Reese's Apartment"	David Grossman	Dan Kopelman	March 21, 2004	06-03-515	9.30
When Lois and Hal find out about the most disgusting and terrible thing Reese has done yet (which is never revealed on-screen), they kick him out of the house. Francis tries to defend Reese and bring him home (without knowing what he did). Dewey enjoys trashing Reese's things and sleeping on his bed. Hal and Lois find that Reese's grades are improving and he takes care of himself, but then discover that he is also $11,000 in credit card debt. They drag him home and Malcolm narrates that she has spent over a month finding a suitable punishment for him.
101	16	"Malcolm Visits College"	Peter Lauer	David Wright	March 28, 2004	06-03-517	9.06
Malcolm looks forward to visiting college – until Lois comes along after learning that Malcolm will be in a coed dorm. When Hal refuses to buy Dewey a piano, Dewey steals items from around the house to build one. Reese pretends to be a drug dealer to befriend a student Christie (Stephanie Lemelin) who turns out to be an undercover cop. Francis and Otto open a daycare, but Otto gets the kids drunk.
102	17	"Polly in the Middle"	Steve Love	Matthew Carlson	April 25, 2004	06-03-516	7.21
Polly the babysitter (Julie Hagerty) is caught in a love triangle between Abe and Craig after Lois sets her up with Craig and Hal sets her up with Abe – unbeknownst to each other – and she enjoys spending time with both of them. Malcolm becomes fed up with Dewey's belief in a lucky shirt, believing he is just being superstitious. Meanwhile, Francis finds himself more and more dominated by Piama's fiery personality, feeling embarrassed in front of his co-ranchers, who are all macho Mexicans who believe that women shouldn't dominate men.
103	18	"Dewey's Special Class"	David D'Ovidio	Maggie Bandur	May 2, 2004	06-03-519	7.45
Malcolm coaches Dewey on how to "throw" an IQ test so he will not end up in the Krelboyne class. When he refuses and announces his intent to join the Krelboynes, Malcolm enlists Reese to take the test for Dewey. However, his poor test-taking skills lands Dewey in the emotionally disturbed "Busey" class instead of keeping him in the regular class. Reese tries to figure out what type of genius he is. Hal and Craig enter a Dance Dance Revolution-style contest. In the cold opening, during a public ceremony of blowing up a dam, Otto and Francis realized they swapped the dynamites meant for the dam for the picnic cooler meant for the audience, resulting in the destruction of Francis' truck.
104	19	"Experiment"	Bryan Cranston	Alex Reid	May 2, 2004	06-03-518	6.92
Stevie and Malcolm try to figure out how Reese managed to separate two bases for an enzyme for a medical experiment when he refuses to tell them. Dewey sells chocolate bars by fibbing (with Francis' help). Meanwhile, Francis teaches assertiveness to a runt pig.
105	20	"Victor's Other Family"	David Grossman	Eric Kaplan	May 9, 2004	06-03-520	5.58
Lois, Reese, Jamie, and Malcolm go to Manitoba to meet Victor's secret family: his other daughter Roberta (Maura Soden), his grandsons Scott (Adam Wylie) and Jerome (Andrew James Allen) and his other wife Sylvia (Betty White). The boys get along and even have fun with their newfound cousins, and everything is fine until Ida arrives, demanding Victor's pension. Lois reluctantly helps her get it, until she discovers that Ida lied to her and Victor is not her biological father. Dewey dreads Hal running with him since bad things always happen before such events between them. Meanwhile, Francis deals with an amorous horse and cow sharing a stall.
106	21	"Reese Joins the Army (Part 1)"	Steve Love	Andy Bobrow	May 16, 2004	06-03-521	7.50
Reese's new girlfriend Beth is about as dim-witted as he is. Malcolm initially dislikes her, but they soon grow to like each other too much, and Beth breaks up with Reese. Devastated, Reese runs away and joins the Army under the false surname "Jetson", where his usual antics get him punished until he outperforms other recruits by training himself to blindly obey every command from drill instructor Sergeant Hendrix. Hal's company goes under, and two FBI agents want him to falsely testify against his employer. He refuses, but they arrest him when the employer provides false testimony against Hal. Lois stresses out when she must work overtime at Lucky Aide to make ends meet. Her snappy demeanor and mounting mental instability get her fired. Dewey enters a piano contest and is angry when no one notices.
107	22	"Reese Joins the Army (Part 2)"	Peter Lauer	Andrew Orenstein	May 23, 2004	06-03-522	7.99
The company uses Hal as a scapegoat. As Lois' mental instability worsens, Francis enlists Malcolm to forge their father's signature in a document that would declare Lois mentally incompetent, emancipate Malcolm, and give Francis and Piama custody of Dewey and Jamie. However, only the missing Reese knows Hal's signature. During a battle simulation, Reese's team is captured because he has trained himself not to think, but he escapes by recalling how he avoided being grounded by his parents and devising an elaborate prank. Malcolm finds evidence that destroys the prosecution's case against Hal but infuriates Lois and snaps her back to normal. She reads a letter form Reese stating he has graduated basic training at the top of his class and received a "reward", which he learns means being deployed into combat in Afghanistan.

== Production ==
In April 2003, Fox renewed Malcolm in the Middle for a fifth season. Main cast members Frankie Muniz, Jane Kaczmarek, Bryan Cranston, Christopher Kennedy Masterson, Justin Berfield and Erik Per Sullivan return as Malcolm, Lois, Hal, Francis, Reese and Dewey respectively. The season reveals that Hal and Lois' fifth child Jamie is a boy. Though it was initially reported that the episode "Lois' Sister" would serve as the series' 100th episode, that honor instead went to the episode "Reese's Apartment".

== Release ==
=== Broadcast history ===
The season premiered on November 2, 2003, on Fox, and ended on May 23, 2004, with a total of 22 episodes.

=== Home media ===
The season was released on Region 2 DVD on April 29, 2013, and on Region 4 DVD on September 4, 2013.

== Reception ==
Josh Wolk wrote for Entertainment Weekly, "The inevitable reality of aging child stars is unfortunate, as Malcolm still amazes with vibrant comic creativity." Scott D. Pierce wrote for Deseret News, "It's not exactly the same show, and viewers may have gotten used to it, but there's still magic there. It can still make you laugh." People was critical of "Reese's Apartment", saying, "No one's saying this boisterous sitcom has to slow down with age. But Malcolm's 100th episode hurts itself by hopping from story line to story line instead of sticking with the strong central situation." The episode "Dewey's Special Class" won the Primetime Emmy Award for Outstanding Choreography.

In 2019, Angelo Delos Trinos of Screen Rant included the episode "Malcolm Films Reese" in his list, "10 Episodes Of Malcolm in the Middle That Aged Poorly". He wrote, "The way privacy is belittled by the characters involved simply won't fly well today, especially in a school setting." He added, "The subplot about Francis dealing with a critic also aged terribly. Here, the newspaper critic is depicted as a vindictive bully who uses his profession to rain bile on everybody. The problem he presents is solved when he's repeatedly beaten senseless."
