= Slack Water =

- Awake episode
- Episode no.: Season 1 Episode 10
- Directed by: Nick Gomez
- Written by: Noelle Valdivia
- Production code: 1ATR09
- Original air date: May 3, 2012
- Running time: 43 minutes

Guest appearances
- Laura Innes as Tricia Harper; Daniela Bobadilla as Emma; Mark Harelik as Carl Kessel; Carlos Lacámara as Joaquin; Paul McCarthy-Boyington as Milo Owens; John Cothran Jr. as Curtis Wilson; Phyllis Applegate as Miss Pearl; Patrick Cox as Perry Jenkins; Kelly Wolf as Angela; John Christopher Storey as Len; Steven Lee Allen as Super; Leonard Kelly-Young as Pawn Shop Owner; Thor Knai as 'SVENgali69'; Don Guevara as Reporter; Liz Montgomery as Homeless Woman; Melissa Weberbales as Nurse

Episode chronology
← Previous "Game Day"	Next → "Say Hello to My Little Friend"

"Slack Water" is the tenth episode of the American television police procedural fantasy drama Awake, which originally aired on NBC on May 3, 2012. Written by Noelle Valdivia and directed by Nick Gomez, "Slack Water" was watched by 2.15 million viewers, including 0.7 percent of those aged between 18 and 49 in Nielsen ratings, upon its initial broadcast in the United States. Critics were largely positive in their reviews of the installment.

Awake centers on Michael Britten (Jason Isaacs), a detective living in two separate realities after a car accident. In one reality, in which he wears a red wristband, his wife Hannah (Laura Allen) survived the accident, and in another reality, in which he wears a green wristband, his son Rex (Dylan Minnette) survived. In this episode, Michael and Isaiah "Bird" Freeman (Steve Harris) are investigating what seems to be a case of gang violence. However, the clues shown to Michael in another reality suggests something deeper. Meanwhile, Hannah is trying to talk through a tough situation with Rex's girlfriend Emma (Daniela Bobadilla).

Some commentators praised the storylines of the "red reality", but criticized the arcs of the "green reality". Laura Innes' guest performance as Tricia Harper was also critically acclaimed. This episode marked the second absence of Rex, as well as the show's two therapists: Dr. Jonathan Lee (BD Wong) and Dr. Judith Evans (Cherry Jones). It was filmed in Los Angeles, California, while sixteen guest actors starred in this episode.

== Plot ==
=== Background ===
The Brittens are involved in a fatal car accident. As a result, Michael, a Los Angeles Police Department (LAPD) detective, begins to live in two separate realities. In one reality, in which he wears a red wristband, his wife Hannah (Laura Allen) survives the accident, and in the other reality, in which he wears a green wristband, his son Rex (Dylan Minnette) survives. Michael does not know which reality is real, and uses the wristbands to differentiate the two.

Michael sees two separate therapists: Dr. Jonathan Lee (BD Wong) in the "red reality", and Dr. Judith Evans (Cherry Jones) in the "green reality". Meanwhile, in the "red reality", Michael and Hannah continue with their plan to move to Oregon. Michael works with Detective Isaiah "Bird" Freeman (Steve Harris) in the "green reality" and with Detective Efrem Vega (Wilmer Valderrama) in the "red reality" after the accident.

=== Events ===
In the "red reality", Michael informs Hannah of Emma's (Daniela Bobadilla) pregnancy with Rex's baby. Pondering Emma's plans of raising the baby, Michael and Hannah conclude that they need to take part. Meanwhile, Michael awakens in the "green reality", and is assigned with Bird to the shooting of a drug dealer, Dion Driggs. Bird opines that the shooter broke in, killed the dealer, and ran off with his drugs, computer, and EVO Smart Console. Michael and Bird then realize that the shooter also took the life of Maya King, a seasoned resident. Back in the "red reality", Vega alerts Michael that he will not be hosting a farewell party for him, and Tricia Harper (Laura Innes) informs the two that gun and drug dealer, Simpson Trujillo has arrived in Los Angeles. Harper returns home where Carl Kessel (Mark Harelik) alerts her of his inability to relocate his heroin. Hannah and Michael visit Angela (Kelly Wolf) and Joaquin (Carlos Lacámara), Emma's parents, who inform them that the baby will be put up for closed adoption; Hannah deems Emma to not be at peace with her parents' decision.

Back in the "green reality", Michael and Bird travel to a pawnshop; the shooter sold the drug dealer's possessions here. The shop's owner (Leonard Kelly-Young) provides them with the shooter's address and name, Perry Jenkins (Patrick Cox). The two capture Jenkins, but he denies having commit a crime; they believe him. Meanwhile, in the "red reality", Emma meets Hannah at a bookstore, and informs her that she does in fact want to give the baby up for adoption. During the celebration of Vega prosecuting Trujillo, Michael notices that the latter's house is synonymous with the one in Driggs' video game. In the evidence room, Michael speaks with username 'SVENgali69' (Thor Knai), a player of the video game. After coming to the conclusion that Driggs' prerogative was to kill King, Bird talks to her friend Miss Pearl (Phyllis Applegate).

== Production ==
"Slack Water" was written by staff writer Noelle Valdivia, her third writing credit for the series. She previously co-wrote episode six, "That's Not My Penguin", with series creator Kyle Killen, and later co-wrote the story for the series finale, "Turtles All the Way Down". The episode was directed by Nick Gomez, his only directing credit for the series.

== Broadcast and reception ==
"Slack Water" originally aired on NBC on May 3, 2012, and was first broadcast in the United Kingdom on Sky Atlantic on July 1, 2012. According to Nielsen ratings, an audience measurement system that determine the audience size and composition of television programming, the episode's initial broadcast in the United States was viewed by approximately 2.2 million viewers and earned a 0.7 rating/2 percent share in the 18–49 demographic, meaning that it was seen by 0.7 percent of all 18- to 49-year-olds and 2 percent of 18- to 49-year-olds watching television at the time of the broadcast. In the United Kingdom, the episode obtained 182,000 viewers, making it the fifth most-viewed program for that channel.

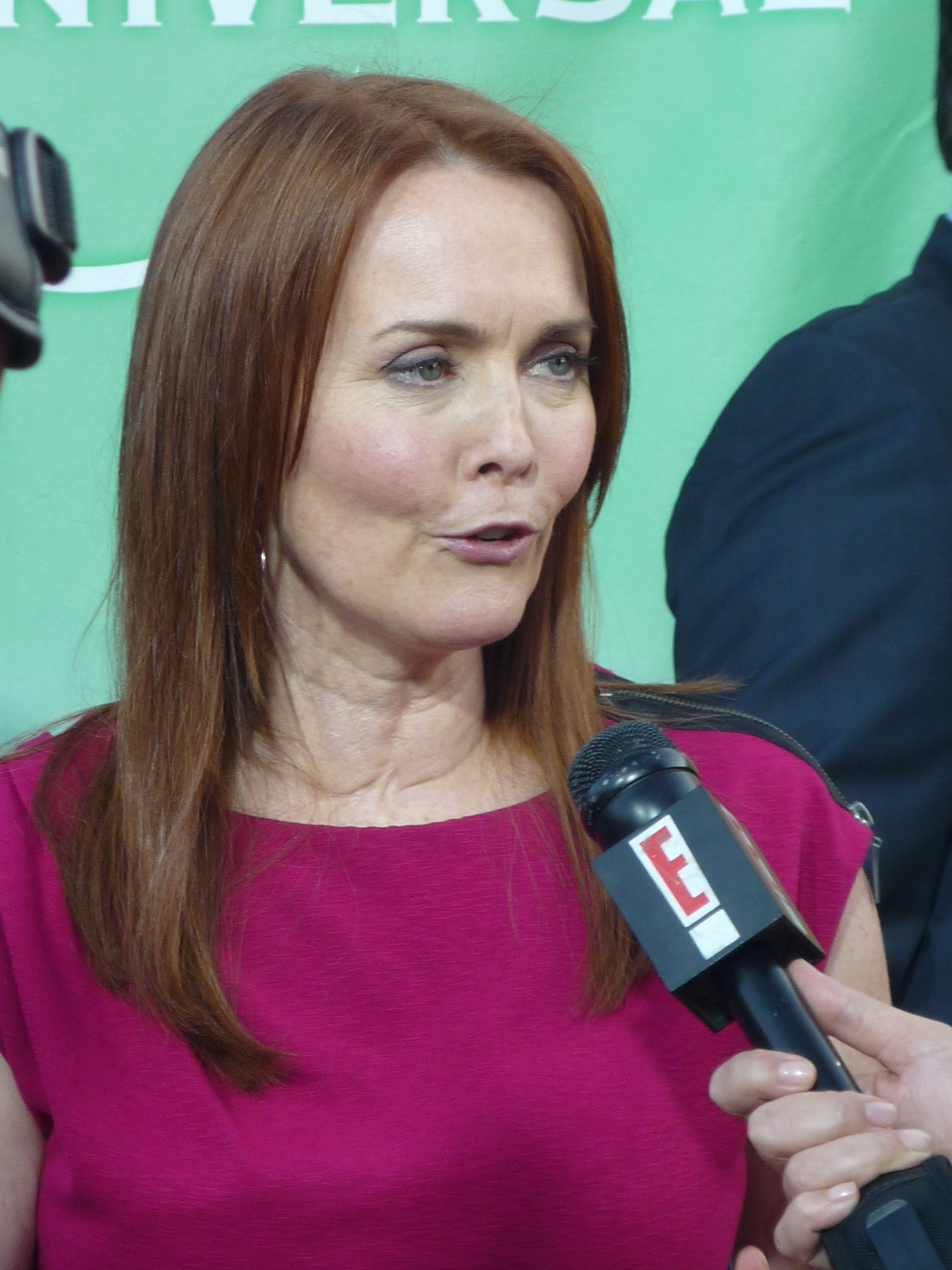
Laura Innes' performance was critically acclaimed.

Writing for HitFix, Alan Sepinwall deemed a scene from the previous episode, "Game Day", "more powerful" than Emma's storyline in "Slack Water". He called the personal and police stories in this episode "predictable", adding: "It was clear, for instance, that Hannah was right and the other adults were wrong about what Emma wanted." Speaking of the guest stars, Sepinwall praised Innes' "excellent" performance, calling it "the episode's strongest moment". He also appreciated the cultural reference to The X-Files, but observed that "none of the episode titles shown were from actual X-Files installments".

The A.V. Club's Zack Handlen was largely critical of the episode, but commented that Bobadilla portrays Emma well, saying she is "low-key and pleasant". Despite this, Handlen was not appreciative of the character's pregnancy plot, because it was handled in a "crass or blatantly exploitative way". He was critical of the shooter storyline, calling it a "bland, utterly impersonal murder mystery which basically wraps up ten minutes early and then has to play for time." Handlen appreciated the reference to The X-Files as well, and concluded of the episode: "While 'Slack Water' was well-acted, and had some well-observed exchanges, it came off as flat in the worst possible way, exposing not just the flaws in its own script, but the potentially insurmountable difficulties which face this series in the weeks ahead."

Largely positive of the episode, Matt Fowler of IGN opined that Michael's two reality storyline was "undiscussed", in turn lacking the "emotional and thematic connector between the two worlds; making them feel totally separate and not part of an individual's enclosed psyche." While Fowler appreciated the "green reality" being in a "suitable and satisfactory manner", he "didn't care all that much about [it]". He was disappointed with the absence of Michael's "thriving" therapy sessions in this episode. Fowler was more positive of the "red reality"; he too appreciated the character of Emma, though he found her moving in with the Brittens "wonky". He concluded that he liked the "ambient, new-agey" background music, and said "while 'Slack Water' was a good episode, it also wasn't the best that this show can do".

Writing for Screen Rant, Kevin Yeoman enjoyed this episode more than the previous one; he opined that "Slack Water" puts an emphasis on characters. Despite this, he commented that the episode felt "dull" due to the "noticeable absence of not only Rex, but also Dr. Lee (B.D. Wong) and Dr. Evans (Cherry Jones)". Yeoman wrote, overall: "Even though the last two weeks have felt strangely sub par with the rest of the season, the episodes themselves have remained entertaining in large part to the fantastic performances of everyone involved – though special consideration must go to Isaacs and Allen, for obvious reasons." Nick McHatton of TV Fanatic gave the episode 4.0 stars out of 5.0, and said "Slack Water" was "one of the poorer episodes", calling the "green reality" "underwhelming" and the "red reality" "awkward".

Den of Geek's Caroline Preece was highly critical of the episode, writing: "The central mystery has all but ironed out by the show's events and producer's comments, and the character of Michael has become little more than a casual observer of his own life." Preece opined that this episode may have led to the show's cancellation, though she appreciated the acting, adding: "While I think the acting on the show is quite fabulous, and the weekly case as good as the best police procedurals on TV, the use of the show's unique dual reality format has been underwhelming, and the unfolding of its mystery far too slow." Preece was also more positive of the "red reality", though she was "not entirely sure where the writers are heading with [the pregnancy] storyline".
