= Nightswimming (Awake) =

- Awake episode
- Episode no.: Season 1 Episode 8
- Directed by: Jeffrey Reiner
- Written by: Leonard Chang; Davey Holmes
- Production code: 1ATR06
- Original air date: April 19, 2012
- Running time: 43 minutes

Guest appearances
- Laura Innes as Tricia Harper; Elijah Alexander as Marcus Ananyev; Ayelet Zurer as Alina Ananyev; Steve Lawrence as Jake; Ron Melendez as Greg Hollander; Yasha Blackman as Vasily; Michael Holden as Neil Shapiro; Emmanuel Todorov as Alexander

Episode chronology
← Previous "Ricky's Tacos"	Next → "Game Day"

"Nightswimming" is the eighth episode of the American television police procedural fantasy drama Awake, which originally aired on NBC on April 19, 2012. Written by Leonard Chang and co-executive producer Davey Holmes, "Nightswimming" was watched by 2.8 million viewers, including 0.9 percent of those aged between 18 and 49 in Nielsen ratings, upon its initial broadcast in the United States. Directed by executive producer Jeffrey Reiner, this episode received generally mixed reviews.

Awake centers on Michael Britten (Jason Isaacs), a detective living in two separate realities after a car crash. In one reality, in which he wears a red wristband, his wife Hannah (Laura Allen) survived the crash, and in another reality, in which he wears a green wristband, his son Rex (Dylan Minnette) survived. In this episode, Michael helps Accountant Marcus Ananyev (Elijah Alexander) and his wife Alina (Ayelet Zurer) start a new life in the Witness Protection Program after a gang member attempts to kill Marcus in the "green reality". In the "red reality", Michael and Hannah prepare for a new life in Oregon after deciding to move there. They go swimming at a college pool to celebrate their love.

Many commentators praised the storylines of the "red reality", but criticized the arcs of the "green reality". This episode marked the first absence of Rex, as well as the show's two therapists: Dr. Jonathan Lee (BD Wong) and Dr. Judith Evans (Cherry Jones). Although it was the eighth broadcast episode, it was scheduled to be the fifth episode. The music featured in this installment was "Pain in My Heart" by Otis Redding. Michael is seen shirtless in two scenes of this episode, one of which was filmed at an actual campus swimming pool. During filming, a woman who was near the swimming pool confronted Isaacs about his nudity. Several of the episode's themes have been critically examined. It was filmed in Los Angeles, California, while eight guest actors starred in this episode.

== Plot ==
=== Background ===
The Brittens are involved in a fatal car crash. As a result, Michael, a Los Angeles Police Department (LAPD) detective, begins to live in two separate realities. In one reality, in which he wears a red wristband, his wife Hannah (Laura Allen) survives the crash, and in the other reality, in which he wears a green wristband, his son Rex (Dylan Minnette) survives. Michael does not know which reality is real, and uses the wristbands to differentiate the two.

Michael sees two separate therapists: Dr. Jonathan Lee (BD Wong) in the "red reality", and Dr. Judith Evans (Cherry Jones) in the "green reality". Meanwhile, in the "red reality", Michael and Hannah continue with their plan to move to Oregon. Michael works with Detective Isaiah "Bird" Freeman (Steve Harris) in the "green reality" and with Detective Efrem Vega (Wilmer Valderrama) in the "red reality" after the crash.

=== Events ===
In the "red reality", two police officers are sitting in a car talking when they receive a report of a break-in at a local college swimming pool. They see Michael running naked from the pool and chase him; when they tell him to stop running, Michael identifies himself as a detective. Meanwhile, in the "green reality", Accountant Marcus Ananyev (Elijah Alexander) exits his house and makes a phone call. Marcus then walks over to his car and tries to start it, but notices a bomb in the car's engine and runs away shortly before it explodes. Soon after, at the police station, Michael and Bird tell Marcus that they will protect him. Marcus' wife, Alina (Ayelet Zurer), comes into the station, where Marcus explains what has happened. Shortly after talking with Marcus and Alina, Michael and Bird take the couple to a hotel for temporary shelter. In the "red reality", Michael notices Hannah cleaning up and packing items before they move to Oregon. Soon after, Michael takes Vega to meet his confidential informant (CI), Jake (Steve Lawrence), with whom he will work after Michael leaves. Jake does not want to work with Vega for an unknown reason, but gives the pair a tip about a warehouse.

That night, Michael, Vega and the SWAT team watch the warehouse but no one shows up; Vega wonders if Jake had given incorrect information. Back in the "green reality", Michael goes to the hotel, since Alina had left in the middle of the night. Once there, Marcus warns Michael and Bird that if they do not find her, Marcus will give himself up to Maxim Basayev, his mobster boss. Back at the station, after looking at evidence, Michael decides to talk to the hotel staff where Alina and Marcus are staying, with Bird, rather than Alina's friends. Later, Michael and Bird go to the home of Greg Hollander (Ron Melendez), one of Alina's friends, but do not find Greg, the person they would like to question regarding Alina's whereabouts. Hollander, who is tied up, kicks down a table as the detectives leave, notifying the cops that he is in there. As the criminals run away, Bird and Michael break into the house; Bird and Michael enter the house, while Bird shoots the two gang members. After that, they speak to Greg, who tells them that Alina constantly talks about how she and her husband have grown apart. Michael goes to search for Alina at a beach and finds her there. The two talk about Marcus and everything that happened previously. Michael explains that she has a chance to start over and takes her back to the hotel. In the "red reality", at Jake's home, Jake says he and Vega can have dinner alone to get to know each other. That night, Michael and Hannah go nude swimming at the college pool.

== Production ==
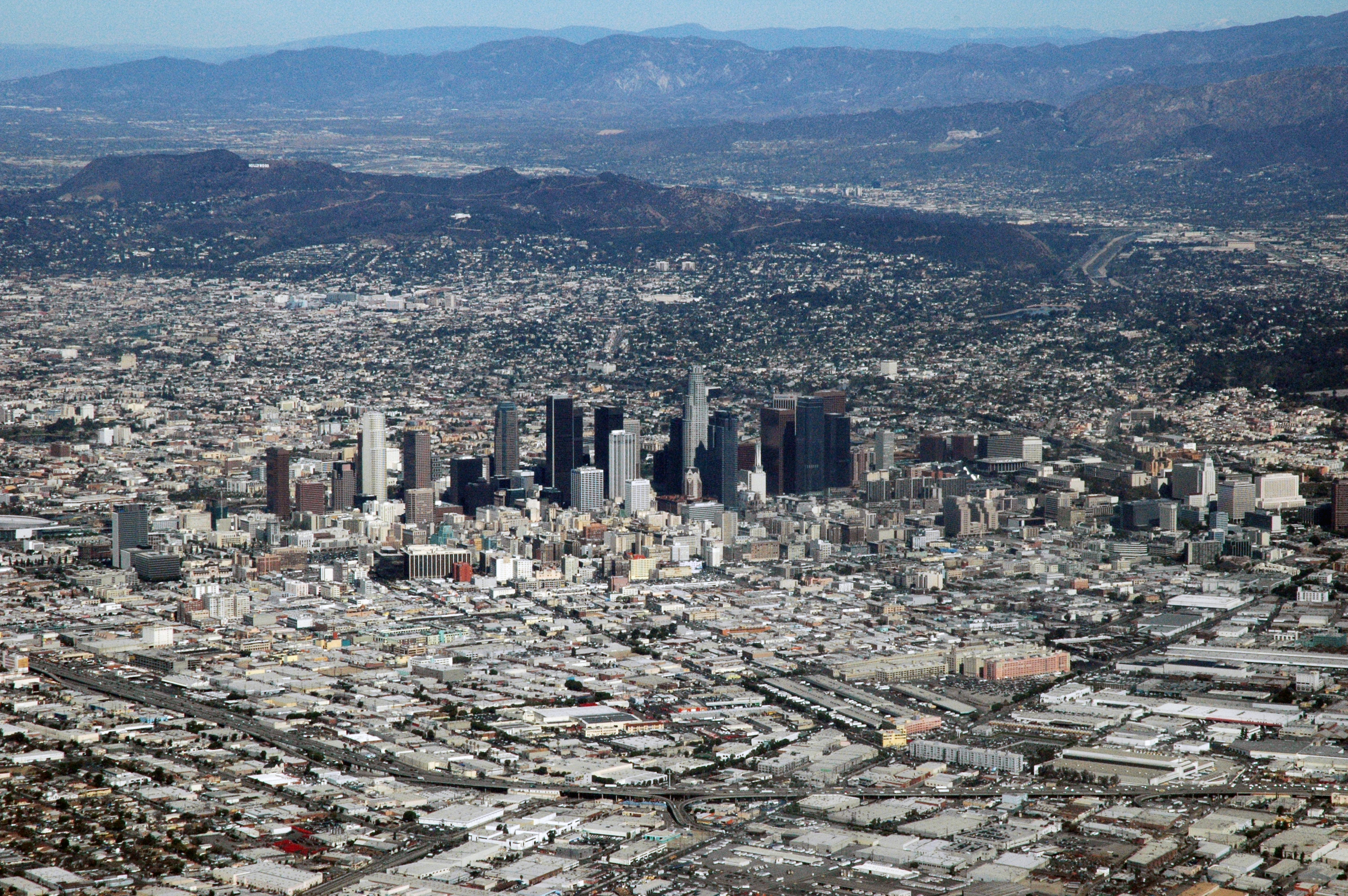
"Nightswimming" was filmed and set in Los Angeles, California, as were all other Awake episodes.

"Nightswimming" was the first episode of the series to have been written by Leonard Chang and co-executive producer Davey Holmes; Chang later helmed "Say Hello to My Little Friend" and the series' finale "Turtles All the Way Down", while Holmes went on to write the teleplay of "Two Birds". The entry was directed by executive producer Jeffrey Reiner, his third directing credit for the show. Reiner also directed two earlier installments—"The Little Guy" and "Guilty", the second and third entries of the program. Stuart Blatt served as the episode's production designer, while Todd Desrosiers edited the music.

Although it was the eighth broadcast episode, it was scheduled to be the fifth episode, until NBC decided to change the broadcasting order. The entry's production code was "1ATR06". "Nightswimming" marked the first absence of Rex, as well as the show's two therapists: Dr. Lee and Dr. Evans. Eight cast members guest starred in this entry. Actress Laura Innes returned to the episode as Captain Tricia Harper, while Lawrence made his first and only appearance as Jake. Alexander, Zurer, Melendez, Blackman, Holden and Todorov also made their first and only appearances as Marcus, Alina, Hollander, Vasily, Shapiro and Alexander, respectively. This entry featured "Pain in My Heart", a song by Otis Redding, which was played during one of a number of scenes where Michael is seen shirtless.

The installment was filmed and set in Los Angeles, California, as were all other Awake episodes. During filming of the installment, Isaacs thought it would be funny to moon down the stairs during a scene in which Hannah and Michael go nude swimming, but stated that it would probably break the Standards and Practices law. Filming of the episode commenced at an actual campus swimming pool for one scene. A lady present during filming asked if Isaacs was naked. Isaacs replied that he was not completely naked, but had a "small piece of material taped over [his] genitals"; the lady said "That's naked," adding "I can see your butt crack." In response, Isaacs "taped a piece of material over [his] butt crack". When the last scene was filmed that day, he ran up the stairs, causing the material—which had been secured only by a piece of sealing tape—to fall off. The woman was "furious". Isaacs thought that the team of Awake would have to withdraw the footage, but was happy to see that part was included in the finished episode.

== Themes ==
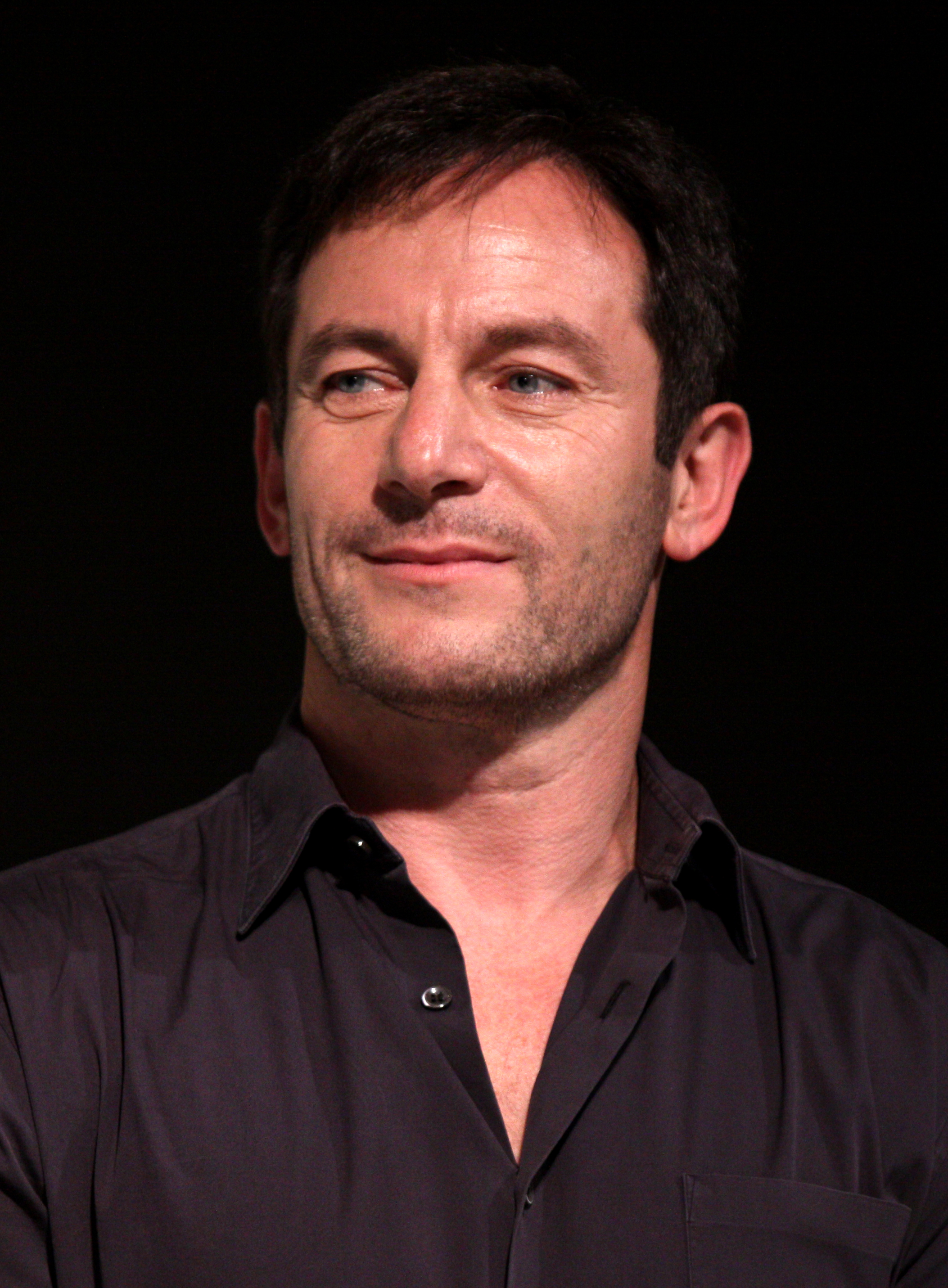
Jason Isaacs' role in the episode's themes have been critically discussed.

Although it did not directly impact the ongoing storyline of Awake, "Nightswimming" introduced and continued key thematic elements of the series. It was described as a "long, roundabout" episode that is "bent on making [Michael] fully commit to moving to Oregon with Hannah" by Matt Fowler from IGN. Fowler thought that, since Rex was not in the episode, the "green reality" seemed more like a dream. In a review of the following episode, "Game Day", he admitted that he thought Alina was behind Marcus' car bomb, since he thought that this story would have an arrest by the end. Writing for HitFix, Alan Sepinwall opined that Michael is "coming to grips with Hannah's desire to move because he loves her that much". However, the Brittens later decided not to move in "Slack Water", the series' tenth episode, owing to personal concerns.

Sepinwall noted that he could see "the obvious parallels to Michael's personal situation" in this installment, while The A.V. Club editor Zack Handlen said that Awake "continues to connect routine procedural storylines and find new ways to give them deeper meaning". Screen Rant writer Kevin Yeoman said that this episode was about "bringing two people who have drifted apart back together" and that "Nightswimming" has "balanced the series' larger mystery with grief and a twinge of optimism" on a "smaller scale" compared to other entries of the program. He claimed that the installment was designed to "introduce us to what makes Hannah and Michael so special", adding that "For most of the series, there hasn't been much chemistry between the two".

In his real reality check, a prediction on which reality is real by the end of the particular episode, Nick McHatton, a TV Fanatic writer, chose the "red reality", because it was "nice to see why Hannah and Michael love each other", while Handlen claimed that "the show has done a fine job at largely standalone episodes", but each episode "feels like its own separate story". He assumed that "there's little feel of rising intensity or greater danger", "given the hints of conspiracy and the ever intensifying threat of Oregon". Caroline Preece of Den of Geek initially assumed "this random nakedness will tie in to the show's central mythology", though she later found out Michael was just swimming nude with Hannah. Preece thought that Hannah and Michael "reconnected" in the episode, as did McHatton. Due to Rex's absence, she thought that this episode allowed viewers to get to know Hannah.

== Broadcast and reception ==
"Nightswimming" originally aired on NBC on April 19, 2012, and was first broadcast in the United Kingdom on Sky Atlantic on June 22, 2012. According to Nielsen ratings, an audience measurement system that determine the audience size and composition of television programming, the episode's initial broadcast in the United States was viewed by approximately 2.8 million viewers and earned a 0.9 rating/2 percent share in the 18–49 demographic, meaning that it was seen by 0.9 percent of all 18- to 49-year-olds and 2 percent of 18- to 49-year-olds watching television at the time of the broadcast. In the United Kingdom, the episode obtained 287,000 viewers, making it the second most-viewed program for that channel behind Hit & Miss.

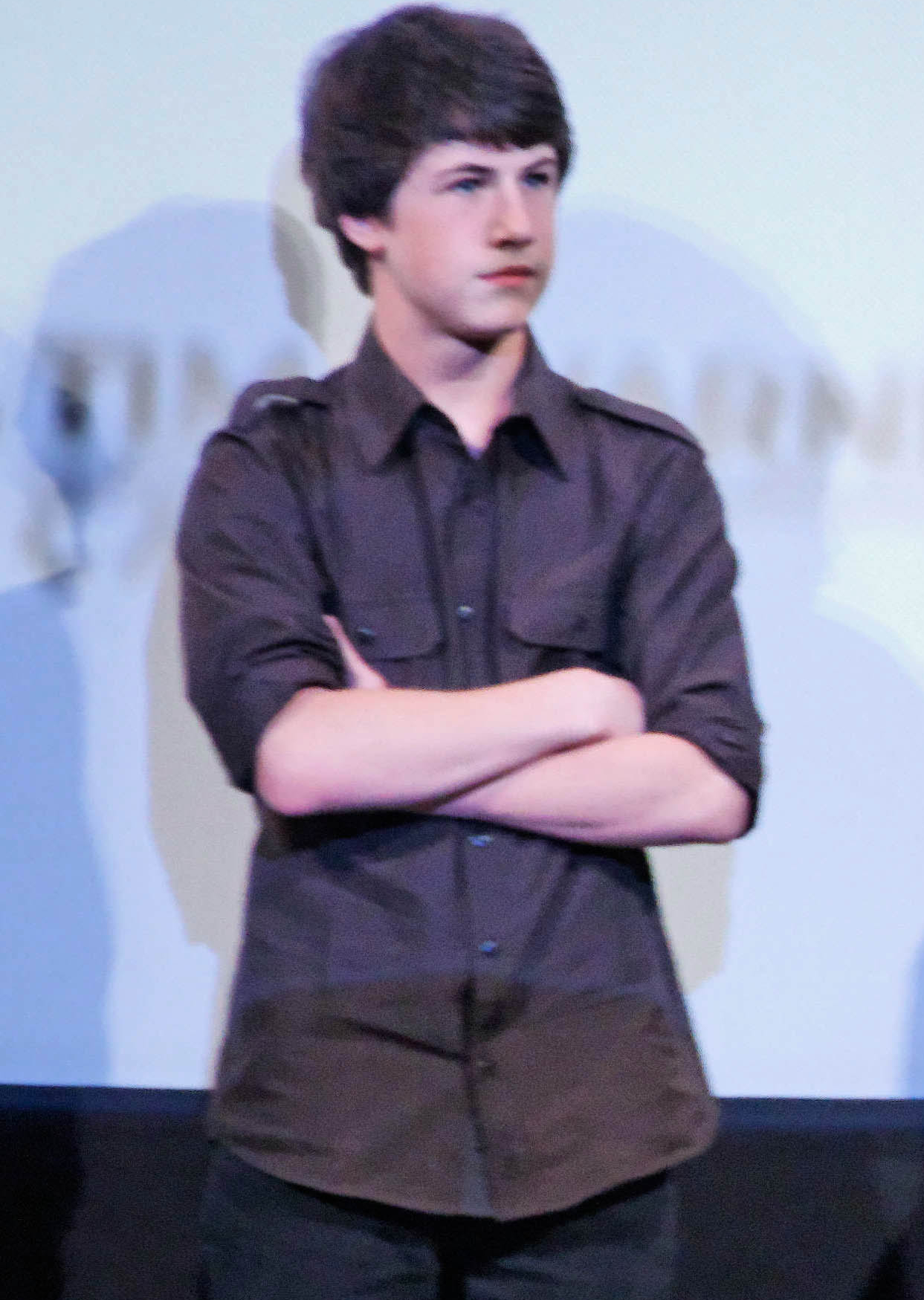
Many critics were disappointed that Dylan Minnette's character, Rex, did not appear in the episode.

This episode received generally mixed reviews from critics. Sepinwall was disappointed with the overall storyline of the "green reality"; he claimed that if the episode was only based on the "red reality", the entry would have been "perfectly fine". Meanwhile, Handlen thought that if the arcs of the "red reality" were not included in this installment, it would not work as an episode. While Sepinwall called the "green reality" storyline "boring", Handlen thought that the storylines of Marcus and Alina did not "matter"; according to Handlen, the episode should not have gotten into the details of the guest stars. Sepinwall and Handlen were disappointed that Rex did not appear in the episode; Handlen praised Rex, calling him a "likable teenage boy" who deserves more running time.

Handlen thought that Michael sounded "reasonable", and Sepinwall said "Awake...[has previously done] a good job of making the guest characters involved in [Michael]'s cases interesting enough that I care about what happens in each investigation." He thought that until this episode the writers had been wise on guest stars and on not focusing on them too much; he also wrote that actors Lawrence and Valderrama did not seem to match each other. Handlen was rather impressed with the storylines of the "red reality" and gave the episode a "B+", writing that "Jake reminded [him] of Al Pacino's aging [gang member] in Donnie Brasco." Sepinwall liked Jake's actor, Lawrence, praising his appearance on the Awake episode.

Fowler showed disappointment as the entry gave no "twists" or "problems" regarding Michael, or his therapy sessions. He compared "Nightswimming" to other Awake episodes, claiming that other entries offer more "plot" and "emotional" problems, while Preece called the entry "strange". She thought that the storylines of the "red reality" were more "interesting" than the "green reality" storylines, and Fowler was disappointed with the song choice for the installment, claiming that the R.E.M. song "Nightswimming" should have been played instead. Preece described the "Nightswimming" episode as a "dull procedural episode" that is devoid of any mythology or forward motion; she called the installment "flat". Despite saying that she was "losing patience" with Awake, Preece said that she was still "keen" to see more.

While Preece wrote that the episode was missing key elements from previous episodes, Fowler criticized the installment, since the first fifteen minutes of the entry were about Marcus and Elena and their lives. Despite this, Fowler praised the final scene of the episode, and Preece called Michael and Hannah's relationship "lovely". Fowler gave this a "7.5" "good" rating, the lowest score for an Awake episode at that time. Preece thought that the episode made "little mistakes", which Awake could not afford to make. McHatton said that "Nightswimming" contains "No conspiracies, no killers, not even murders", just a "procedural case that mirrored [Michael]'s life at home". Despite this, he praised Michael and Hannah's relationship, claiming that "it's nice to watch as they reconnect with each other"; he gave it a "4.5" rating out of "5.0". Meanwhile, Yeoman stated that the entry opened to "a certain amount of whimsy" and that, "starting [the episode] off with the series' protagonist in the buff isn't exactly textbook."
