= Billy Lush =

American actor (born 1981)

- Born: November 30, 1981 (age 44); New Haven, Connecticut, U.S.
- Occupation: Actor
- Years active: 2002–present

Billy Lush (born November 30, 1981) is an American actor from New Haven, Connecticut. He graduated from Coral Springs High School in Coral Springs, Florida in 1999. He later attended Florida State University to pursue theatre. Roles include Kevin Donnelly on the NBC drama The Black Donnellys, which was canceled by NBC in April 2007 after one season, and Lance Cpl. Harold James Trombley on the 2008 HBO miniseries Generation Kill. He played Liam Hennessy, an undercover policeman in the Irish American mob, in the 2011 Fox show The Chicago Code, which was also canceled after one season.

== Filmography ==
| Year | Title | Role | Notes |
|---|---|---|---|
| 2002 | Hack | Lucas Atherton | Episode: "Favors" |
| 2002 | Flights | Albert "Meteor" Playdes | Short film |
| 2002 | Law & Order: Special Victims Unit | Karl Sirret | Episode: "Resilience" |
| 2003-2005 | Law & Order: Criminal Intent | Conroy "Connie" Smith | Episodes: "Sound Bodies" "In the Wee Small Hours" (part 1) |
| 2004 | Soleado | Bar Friend | Short film |
| 2004 | Stateside | Nando | |
| 2004 | A Million Miles to Sunshine | Mike | Short film |
| 2005 | Without a Trace | Randall Bowen | Episode: "Penitence" |
| 2005 | ER | Benny | Episode: "The Show Must Go On" |
| 2005 | Clubhouse | Dwight | Episode: "Player Rep" |
| 2005 | Six Feet Under | Paul Duncan | Episode: "Static" |
| 2006 | Huff | Jake Steward | Episodes: "Used, Abused and Unenthused" "Red Meat" "A Cornfield Grows in L.A." |
| 2006 | Beautiful Dreamer | Bobby | |
| 2006 | Arc | Bobby Ward | |
| 2007 | Reign of the Gargoyles | Charles 'Chick' Gweitz | TV movie |
| 2007 | One Night | Angry Guy | |
| 2007 | The Black Donnellys | Kevin Donnelly | Series regular |
| 2008 | Mercenary | Guy | Short film |
| 2008 | Generation Kill | Lance Cpl. Harold James Trombley | TV miniseries |
| 2008 | CSI: Crime Scene Investigation | Nathan Murphy | Episode: "Woulda, Coulda, Shoulda" |
| 2008 | Terminator: The Sarah Connor Chronicles | Eric | Episode: "Self Made Man" |
| 2009 | Cold Case | Pete Scanell | Episode: "Mind Games" |
| 2009 | Trauma | Sam Bailey | Episode: "Pilot" |
| 2010 | Norman | James | |
| 2010 | Three Rivers | Craig Derkin | Episode: "Status 1A" |
| 2010 | Madso's War | Tommie Walker | TV movie |
| 2011 | The Chicago Code | Liam Hennessey | Series regular |
| 2011 | The Glades | Andrew Bailey | Episode: "Shine" |
| 2011 | Straw Dogs | Chris | |
| 2011 | Castle | Finn McQueen | Episode: "Kick The Ballistics" |
| 2012 | Awake | Gabriel Wyath III | Episode: "That's Not My Penguin" |
| 2012 | CSI: NY | Kieran Reilly | Episode: "Sláinte" |
| 2012 | Vegas | Cale Green | Episode: "Pilot" |
| 2012 | Dishonored | The Outsider (voice) | Video game |
| 2012 | Hitman: Absolution | Goon #2/Additional Voices (voice) | Video game |
| 2012 | Stupid Hype | Frenchy | TV movie |
| 2012 | Low Winter Sun | Nick Paflas | Series regular |
| 2015 | NCIS | Fisher Hyland | Episode: "Personal Day" |
| 2015 | Bones | Seth Turkland | Episode: "The Doom in the Boom" |
| 2016 | Ray Donovan | Vincent Simmons | Episode: "Girl with Guitar" |
| 2018 | Gone Are the Days | Virgil | |
| 2018 | Criminal Minds | Caleb Sands | Episode: "Mixed Signals" |
| 2019 | You | Raphael Passero | Season 2 |
| 2020 | 911:Lonestar | Rick | Episode: "Austin, We Have A Problem" |
| 2021 | Mayor of Kingstown | Kenny Miles | Episode: "Simply Murder" |
| 2022 | The Rookie | Murray | Episode: "Fight or Flight" |
| 2023–2024 | For All Mankind | Mike Bishop | 4 episodes |
