= Game Day (Awake) =

- Awake episode
- Episode no.: Season 1 Episode 9
- Directed by: Michael Waxman
- Written by: Howard Gordon; David Graziano
- Production code: 1ATR07
- Original air date: April 26, 2012
- Running time: 43 minutes

Guest appearances
- Laura Innes as Tricia Harper; Daniela Bobadilla as Emma; Chris Marquette as Kenneth Jones; Ron Yuan as Solomon Kang; François Chao as John Kho; Elizabeth Sung as Sumi Kho; Marco Rodríguez as Marco; Drew Powell as George; Lupe Carranza as Sabina Fernandez; Jerry Chu as Jinsung Do; Kyle Sabihy as Rob Jones; Christopher Schauble as Sports Announcer (voice); Exie Booker as Security Guard; Jordana Capra as Dr. Karen Koretz; Lynn A. Henderson as LAPD Investigator Cynthia Harrison; Kieu Chinh as Mrs. Do; Michelle Marsh as Colleen Jones; Mike Nojun Park as Driving Instructor

Episode chronology
← Previous "Nightswimming"	Next → "Slack Water"

"Game Day" is the ninth episode of the American television police procedural fantasy drama Awake. The episode was scheduled to be the eighth broadcast episode but NBC changed the broadcasting order. It premiered on NBC on April 26, 2012. The episode was written by executive producer Howard Gordon and writer David Graziano. The episode was directed by Michael Waxman. "Game Day" earned a Nielsen rating of 0.8, being watched by 2.21 million viewers in its initial broadcast.

The show centers on Michael Britten (Jason Isaacs), a detective living in two separate realities after a car crash. In this episode, the fictional professional football teams from Seattle and Los Angeles are in the final game of the year. The LAPD team get prepared to stop fights, and outstanding arguments. In the "green reality", Seattle Jets fan Rob Jones (Kyle Sabihy) is involved in a fight, and is found dead soon after; his brother Kenneth Jones (Chris Marquette) is the victim, and the detective later realize that he did this. Meanwhile, Rex (Dylan Minnette) is having troubles with his girlfriend Emma (Daniela Bobadilla). In the "red reality", Michael and Vega (Wilmer Valderrama) investigate a case with Sabina Fernandez, who died in a fire due to smoke inhalation. The fire inspector confirms that it was arson made to look like an accident. All of these crimes happened due to the game. Meanwhile, Vega plans a party for Michael's move to Oregon, and leaving the police department.

== Plot ==
In the "green and red realities", Captain Tricia Harper (Laura Innes) has her men mobilize for an upcoming "Pacific Coast Bowl" game between the Seattle Jets and Los Angeles Bulldogs. In the "green reality" (where Rex (Dylan Minnette) is alive, and Hannah (Laura Allen) is not), at the football stadium, one Seattle fan, Rob Jones (Kyle Sabihy), loses his temper and tries to pick a fight. Meanwhile, in the "red reality" (where Hannah is alive, and Rex is not from alive), John Koh (François Chao), is busy placing a $100,000 bet over the phone for Seattle to win over Los Angeles. As he favors his broken arm, his bookie warns him that if he does not pay then he will have his men break John's other arm. Soon after, Michael Britten (Jason Isaacs) sees Los Angeles win the game in the "green reality", while in the "red reality", Michael sees Seattle win the game. Later, Rob turns up dead in the parking lot, his skull bashed in. When the body is discovered, the police are called in and Michael and Bird (Steve Harris) talk to Rob's brother, Kenneth (Chris Marquette).

== Production ==
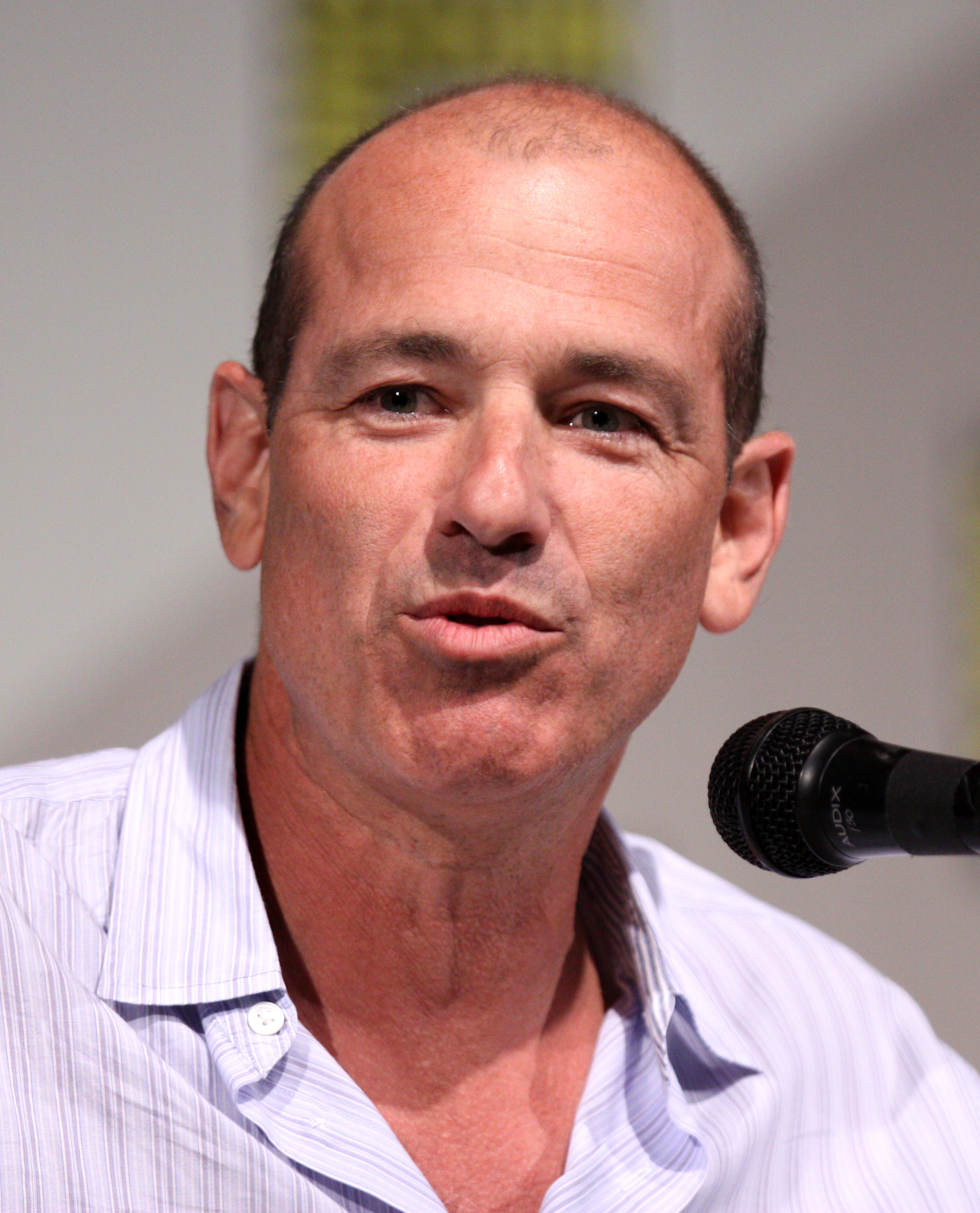
Howard Gordon (pictured) wrote the episode's script, alongside freelance writer David Graziano.

"Game Day" was written by executive producer Howard Gordon, and freelance writer David Graziano; the entry was directed by Michael Waxman. It was Gordon's third writing credit, Graziano's first writing credit, and Waxman's first directing credit in the series. Although it was the ninth broadcast episode, it was originally scheduled to be the eighth episode of the season, with the production code being "1ATR07".

== Reception ==
Zack Handlen of The A.V. Club gave the episode a C+ rating.
