= Reign of the Gargoyles =

- Genre: Action; Adventure; Fantasy; Syfy; War
- Written by: Chase Parker
- Directed by: Ayton Davis
- Starring: Joe Penny; Wes Ramsey; Sean Mahon; Julia Rose; Billy Lush; John Ashton; Brad Beyer; Miroslav Emilov; Boris Pankin; Stoyan Mladenov; Johnathan Sparcino; Rushi Vidinliev; Yulian Vergov; Evgeni Gospodinov; Bryan O'Duffy; Lina Zlateva; Dejan Angelov; Vlado Mihailov; Ryan Spike Dauner
- Theme music composer: Michael Rubino
- Country of origin: United States
- Original language: English

Production
- Producers: Jeffery Beach; Phillip J. Roth
- Cinematography: Lorenzo Senatore
- Editor: Matt Michael
- Running time: 88 minutes
- Production companies: Sci Fi Pictures; Concrete Productions; Unified Film Organization (UFO)

Original release
- Network: Syfy
- Release: March 24, 2007

Reign of the Gargoyles is a television film released in the United States on March 24, 2007. It is set in Europe during World War II.

== Plot ==
Sometime in World War II, German SS officers discover ancient ruins which contain stone gargoyles. They bring the gargoyles to life with blood so they can combat U.S. forces. Instead of complying, the gargoyles kill the Nazis and then attack local French villages. After an American bomber attack is devastated by the gargoyles, the US launches another bomber force in an attempt to destroy them. The crew of a bomber, the "Grey Ghost" flown by Major John Gustafson (Joe Penny) is attacked by the gargoyles and crashes.

The crew parachute to safety before the bomber crashes, but are again attacked by gargoyles. Some are rescued by British soldiers, others by local villagers. The remaining crew meet in a church the locals are sheltering in. A woman named Sophie fills them in on the legend behind the gargoyles.

She relates the story of a group of pagans that built a statue of their "horned king" deity, Vorthorn out of a mysterious 'bloodstone'. It was then brought to life to take vengeance on their persecutors. It destroyed their enemies, but Vorthorn learned that he could bring other stone gargoyles to life itself. He built a gargoyle army and then turned on its creators and killed them all.

The gargoyles can be defeated by piercing the heart of Vorthorn with the Spear of Destiny. It is discovered that the knight who defeated the gargoyles was buried with the spear. To overcome the gargoyles the flight crew must retrieve the spear.

Vorthorn attacks, tearing a soldier in half. The church and village are then bombed by German Junkers Ju 88 bombers, which the gargoyles attacks. The American aircrew, the village woman and British soldiers leave to find the spear. The German army arrives looking for the aircrew and kill a villager to force the others to talk.

Two of the aircrew, Porter and Nash, are captured by the German army and left tied up in the open to distract the gargoyles.

The tomb is reached and the spear recovered. However, the Germans arrive just then and attack. Most of them are killed, but Gus (Joe Penny) is shot and killed by the last German Officer. The Officer is then shot, and the gargoyles arrive, but hold back in fear of the Spear.

Down to four, two British, Sophie and one airman discover their friends remains, then continue on to the ruins to kill Vorthorn. They enter the ruins and are again attacked by the gargoyles. They kill many and also retrieve many maps and other documents left by the Nazis. One of the fliers and a British soldier fly a German Heinkel He 111 bomber up to confront the Gargoyles, while the remaining airman and the village woman on the ground are also attacked. Vorthorn is rammed by the bomber and those aboard stab him with the Spear, returning him to stone. All the other gargoyles also turn back into stone, just in the nick of time to save the woman and airman below in the ruins.

== Cast ==
- Joe Penny as Major John "Gus" Gustafson
- Wes Ramsey as Will "Ace" McCallister
- Billy Lush as Charles "Chick" Gweitz
- Julia Rose as Sophie
- Brad Beyer as Captain Porter
- Sean Mahon as Major James Deacon
- John Ashton as Colonel Latham
- Miroslav Emilov as Nash
- Boris Pankin as Lieutenant Eyepatch
- Stoyan Mladenov as Mike "Finn" Finnigan
- Jonathan Sparacino as Sobczek
- Rushi Vidinliev as Van Horn
- Yulian Vergov as Colonel Schrieber
- Evgeni Gospodinov as Lieutenant Mueller
- Bryan O' Duffy as Colonel Sears
- Lina Zlateva as Anna
- Dejan Angelov as B-51 Pilot
- Vlado Mihailov as Karel
- Ryan Spike Dauner as Adjutant
- Raicho Vasilev as British Soldier (uncredited)

== Filming Location ==
The Castle scenes were filmed at the Belogradchik Fortress.
