= That's Not My Penguin =

- Awake episode
- Michael experiences hallucinations after being injected with ketamine by Gabriel Wyath.
- Episode no.: Season 1 Episode 6
- Directed by: Scott Winant
- Written by: Kyle Killen; Noelle Valdivia
- Production code: 1ATR04
- Original air date: April 5, 2012
- Running time: 43 minutes

Guest appearances
- Billy Lush as Gabriel Wyath; Matt Riedy as SWAT Commander Hamilton; John Christopher Storey as Tech; Daniela Bobadilla as Emma

Episode chronology
← Previous "Oregon"	Next → "Ricky's Tacos"

"That's Not My Penguin" is the sixth episode of the American television police procedural fantasy drama Awake. The episode premiered on April 5, 2012, on NBC, and was simultaneously broadcast on Global in Canada. It was written by series creator and executive producer Kyle Killen and staff writer Noelle Valdivia, and was directed by Scott Winant. "That's Not My Penguin" was well received by television critics, who praised its storylines. Commentators noted that the script was well written and that the episode worked "either way". Upon airing, the episode garnered 2.56 million viewers in the United States and a 0.9 rating in the 18–49 demographic, according to Nielsen ratings. It was the lowest-rated show of the timeslot.

The show centers on Michael Britten (Jason Isaacs), a police detective living in two separate realities after a car accident. In this episode, Michael enters a psychiatric hospital during a hostage situation by Gabriel Wyath (Billy Lush). Gabriel wants the police and Michael to find his sister Christie, who was murdered. However, Gabriel has created a separate reality where she was kidnapped by Dr. Wild rather than murdered. In the "green reality", Michael looks for a "ring", which is Dr. Wild's; Rex stole it for his girlfriend Emma (Daniela Bobadilla). Michael meets Emma and gets the ring back. He also experiences hallucinations after being injected by Gabriel, seeing a penguin and Dr. Jonathan Lee (BD Wong).

== Plot ==
The episode opens with Gabriel Wyath (Billy Lush) in a psychiatric ward after blowing up a government building. There are doctors who are taking notes and comparing Wyath's behavior to that of Michael Britten. The doctor's note that the two are sharing signs of disorganization, having odd behavior, and suffering from a sleeping disorder. Later, in the "green reality" (where Rex is alive, and Hannah is dead from the crash) Michael forgets to sign a permission form for a field trip. He goes to work, and asks Efrem Vega (Wilmer Valderrama) if the prints came back. Since he is in the "green reality", Efrem is confused, because he is not his partner in this world. Michael suddenly realizes that he is in the "green reality". Later, Bird is bragging about his astronaut bed, when Dr. Wild comes to Michael's desk, and asks for his ring. In the "red reality" (where Hannah is alive, and Rex is dead from the crash), Michael goes to work, and is called in for a hospital hostage situation. Gabriel Wyath (Billy Lush) is the one causing the situation. He demands to see his sister Christie. However, she was murdered in a dispute with an ex-boyfriend. Gabriel created a separate world where she was not murdered, but rather kidnapped by Dr. Wild.

Later, Dr. Lee explains what they are dealing with. Gabriel allows Michael to come in the hospital, but nobody else. Michael enters the building and realizes that he has a "dead man switch", meaning that if Wyath is shot, then the whole building will blow up. Gabriel goes up near the window to handle a man who is screaming, and the police are prepared to shoot him. However, to prevent Gabriel from using his switch, Michael jumps at him, causing him to divert his path. Gabriel knocks him out, and shortly after injects him with ketamine. Michael suddenly wakes up in his "green reality". Michael is looking for a ring, which is Dr. Wild's. He sees a hallucination of a penguin, caused by the drugs. The penguin tells him that Rex has the ring. He calls him down, and Rex reveals that he stole it for his girlfriend, Emma (Daniela Bobadilla). Michael meets Emma and gets the ring back. Dr. Evans (Cherry Jones) claims that he is "having a nightmare about madness". He wakes up in the "red reality" and sees Dr. Lee helping him. The police are coming in to shoot him. Michael quickly phones and tells them to stop, due to the "dead man switch". Gabriel and Michael talk about Gabriel's two reality life. This makes Michael think about his life. Shortly later, Michael and Dr. Evans are talking about his mind. He thinks about his life and tells her that he is okay. During a subsequent discussion, he finds out that Dr. Lee was not really inside his mind; he was actually helping himself.

== Production ==
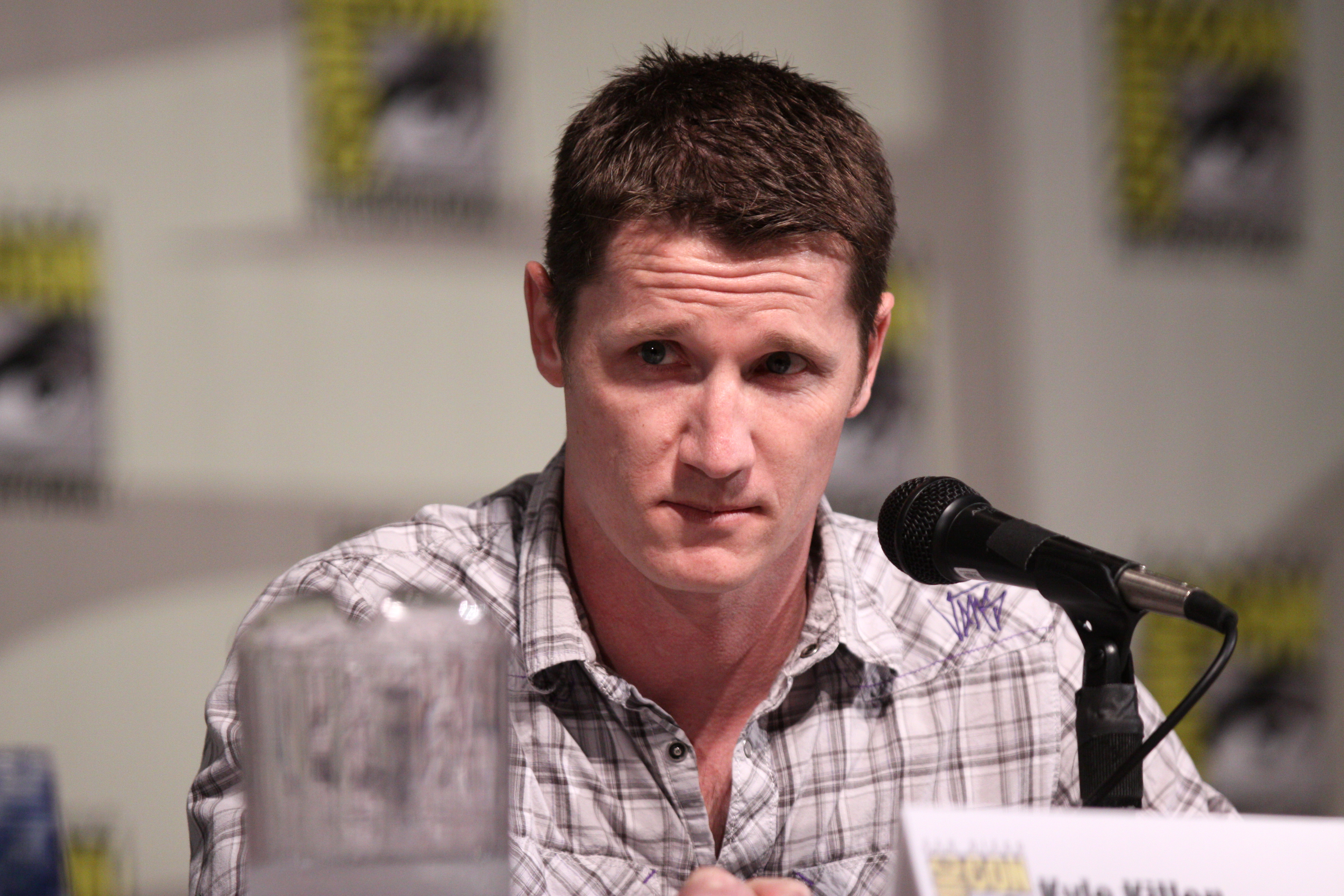
Series creator and executive producer Kyle Killen (pictured) wrote the episode's script, alongside staff writer Noelle Valdivia.

The episode was written by series creator Kyle Killen and staff writer Noelle Valdivia, and was directed by Scott Winant; it was Killen's fourth writing credit, with the last episode he wrote being "Kate Is Enough". The episode was Valdivia's first writing credit on the series and Winant's first directing credit.

The episode featured guest performances from Billy Lush, who was cast as Gabriel Wyath, Matt Riedy, who was cast as the SWAT Commander Hamilton, John Christopher Storey, who was cast as the Tech, and Daniela Bobadilla, who is cast as Emma, Rex's girlfriend.

== Reception ==
=== Ratings ===
"That's Not My Penguin" was originally broadcast on April 5, 2012 in the United States on NBC between 10:00 pm and 11:00 pm, preceded by Up All Night. Upon airing, the episode garnered 2.56 million viewers in the United States despite airing simultaneously with The Mentalist on CBS, and the series premiere of the drama series Scandal on ABC. It acquired a 0.9 rating in the 18–49 demographic, meaning that it was seen by 0.9% of all 18- to 49-year-olds, according to Nielsen ratings. The episode's ratings dropped from the previous episode, "Oregon". It was simultaneously broadcast on Global in Canada, and was subsequently aired on Sky Atlantic in the United Kingdom on June 8, 2012.

=== Critical response ===
"That's Not My Penguin" was well received by television commentators. Matt Fowler of IGN gave an extremely positive review. He claimed that the story worked "either way" and that it was "awesome", mainly because of the hallucinations. Fowler stated that he had his "mind blown" and that the best part of the episode was "when the show, for a little while, actually made me think that there was something to Gabriel's Dr. Wild story". Claiming that he was "hooked" to the show, Folwer concluded his review by giving the episode a "9 out of 10" classifying it as "amazing". Zack Handlen of The A.V. Club enjoyed the episode. In his "A−" review, he noted that the episode "doesn't show any signs of imminent immolation". He thought that the morale of the episode was "wanting something to be real doesn't make it easier to pretend, and the harder Michael has to work to keep this up, the better the odds that he’s going to lose his grip". Alan Sepinwall of HitFix "loved" the episode. Nick McHatton of TV Fanatic gave the episode a "5 out of 5" as a perfect score and thought that the entry "really used Awake's concept to its advantage".
