= Chris McGarry =

American actor (born 1966)

- Born: August 19, 1966 (age 59); Roselle, New Jersey, U.S.
- Occupation: Actor
- Years active: 1987, 2001–present
- Known for: Law & Order

Chris McGarry (born August 19, 1966) is an American actor born in Roselle, New Jersey, known for his performance in the American television series Law & Order on NBC from 2001 to 2005. Some of his other television acting credits include Law & Order: Special Victims Unit, CSI: Crime Scene Investigation, The Sopranos, The Unit, Boston Legal, Mad Men, Big Love and 24. In 2012, he had a four-episode stint as Dr. Banks in the series Awake. In 2023, he appeared as the main character in The Murdoch Murders, directed by Jason Winn.

McGarry has also performed on stage in the New York City and Chicago area. He made his Broadway Debut in SALOME with Al Pacino and starred opposite Cherry Jones in the National Broadway Tour of John Patrick Shanley's DOUBT. McGarry also starred opposite Timothee Chalamet and Robert Sean Leonard in Shanley’s PRODIGAL SON for Manhattan Theatre Club and with Tom Hardy in Brett C. Leonard's THE LONG RED ROAD, directed by Philip Seymour Hoffman, at The Goodman Theater in Chicago. He is a member of The Actor's Studio and LAByrinth Theater Company.
