= Robert Soden =

English painter

Robert Soden (born 1955 in Taunton, Somerset) is an English artist and painter.

He was trained as a painter at the Royal College of Art, London, 1979–1982. He has paintings in the collection of the Victoria and Albert Museum; Science Museum, London; Laing Art Gallery, Newcastle; Sunderland Museum and Winter Garden; MIMA, Middlesbrough; London Transport Museum; Northumbria University Gallery; National Coal Mining Museum, Wakefield; Durham University, and University of Sunderland, Parliamentary Art Collection.
