= Gordon Ross (Australian footballer) =

Australian rules footballer

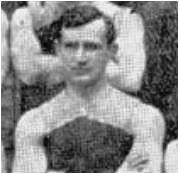
- Ross in 1903

Personal information
- Full name: Thomas Gordon Ross
- Born: 26 July 1878; Chewton, Victoria
- Died: 23 August 1952 (aged 74); Gordon, New South Wales
- Original team: University of Melbourne

Playing career^{1}
Years	Club	Games (Goals)
1900–1901	Fitzroy	4 (1)
1902–1903	Carlton	30 (0)
Total		34 (1)
- ^{1} Playing statistics correct to the end of 1903.

Thomas Gordon Ross (26 July 1878 – 23 August 1952) was an Australian rules footballer who played with Fitzroy and Carlton.

== Sources ==
- Holmesby, Russell & Main, Jim (2009). The Encyclopedia of AFL Footballers. 8th ed. Melbourne: Bas Publishing.
- Gordon Ross's playing statistics from AFL Tables
