= Saint Gertrude High School =

Location
- 12829 River Road; Richmond, Virginia 23238; United States

Information
- Type: Private college-preparatory school
- Motto: Latin: Ora et Labora (Prayer and Work)
- Religious affiliations: Catholic, Benedictine Sisters
- Established: 1922; 104 years ago
- President: MAJ Jesse A. Grapes
- Head of school: Amy Roussey Pickral, Class of 1995
- Grades: 9–12
- Gender: All girls
- Enrollment: 215 (2022-23)
- Average class size: 15
- Student to teacher ratio: 7:1
- Colors: Green & white
- Athletics conference: Virginia Independent Schools Athletic Association
- Mascot: Gator
- Team name: Gators
- Rival: St. Catherine's Saints
- Accreditation: Southern Association of Colleges and Schools
- Publication: Labora (Entrepreneurship Journal) "The Towers" (Annual School Magazine)
- Yearbook: Tower
- Affiliation: NAIS (VAIS); NCEA
- Website: www.saintgertrude.org

Saint Gertrude High School is an independent Catholic college preparatory day school for young women grades 9–12 in Richmond, Virginia. It was founded in 1922 by the Benedictine Sisters of Virginia, of Bristow Monastery, and is still owned and governed by the order, although the day-to-day operations are run by lay administrative and teaching staff. The school's goal is to provide young women with an academic education in an environment of Christian values and cultural diversity.

== History ==
Saint Gertrude was built in 1913 to provide a home and a chapel for the Benedictine Sisters who taught at Saint Mary's School on Fourth and Marshall Streets in Richmond. The building had two rooms used as a small private elementary school and housed a care center for exceptional children which was later discontinued.

In 1922, Saint Edith Academy, a boarding school for girls at Bristow, Virginia was closed, and the high school department was transferred to Saint Gertrude in Richmond. Sister Gertrude Head, the first principal, and a three-member faculty began the educational program for eight students. In the course of the first year, the enrollment increased to twenty-six.

The school continued to operate solely in the original building until a new classroom wing was added in 1956. These two structures then made up the school building for nearly twenty years, until the 1973 addition was completed. The newest addition, dedicated in May 2005, houses a new library/media Center, athletic facility, and science labs.

At the very onset, the school was affiliated with the Catholic University of America. In 1925, Saint Gertrude was accredited by the Virginia State Board of Education and in 1942 by the Southern Association of Colleges and Schools. In 1978, the school became a member of the Virginia Association of Independent Schools. Saint Gertrude's accreditation continues to be through VAIS and SACS, which are affiliated with the Virginia Council of Private Education. Saint Gertrude High School was awarded "Blue Ribbon School" designation in 1996.

== Athletics ==
The school fields 17 teams in 12 sports. Teams offered by season include: Fall: Tennis, Volleyball (JV and Varsity), Field Hockey (JV and Varsity), Cross Country; Winter: Basketball (JV White, JV Green, Varsity), Indoor Track, Swimming; Spring: Softball, Soccer (JV and Varsity), Lacrosse, Outdoor Track, Golf.

== Song Contest ==
Song Contest is a musical competition among the four classes, held every year at the Altria Theater in downtown Richmond. Over 3,000 people pack in to see each class present a program of familiar tunes with original lyrics, along with the Saint Gertrude High School Alma mater. Judging is based on music, lyrics, spirit, leaders, and class participation. The order of class performance has been determined by a drawing.

The event was started in 1950 by Mary Anne Waymack and the school's athletic association and follows the tradition of choral tournaments at women-only schools such as Pittsburgh's Chatham University, which has a similar contest. The competition started in the basement classrooms of Saint Gertrude, a space students affectionately call "the dungeon." The yearly event subsequently outgrew the Benedictine High School gym, the Arthur Ashe Center and the Carpenter Center, and this year's Song Contest will take place at the 3,565-seat Altria Theater.

Each class is represented by their class colors, and a first and second place is awarded by three judges, one of whom is an alumna of the school and two others who have been selected for their musical background and expertise. The first-place winners of Song Contest 2023 was the class of Pink and Lime, with the class winning for the third year in a row.

In the week leading up to Song Contest, the classes decorate the hallways with their colors and theme, perform for their classmates, and rehearse.

== Notable alumnae ==
- Leslie Bibb, actress, model
- Maura Soden, actress, producer
- Maggie Antone, musical artist
