= Noelle Valdivia =

American television writer, playwright

- Born: New York, NY
- Occupations: Television writer, playwright
- Years active: 2003–present

Noelle Valdivia is an American television writer and playwright. She is best known for her work on the Showtime drama Masters of Sex, and the NBC musical Smash.

Until 2012 Valdivia worked as a journalist and playwright. After graduation from NYU she began her television career working on the NBC drama Awake, where she wrote three episodes of that series. She wrote on season 2 of the musical drama Smash. In 2013, she worked on the Showtime drama Masters of Sex where she was nominated for a 2013 WGA Award.

As a playwright, she wrote the stage productions Oh, William (2003), Ring of Fire (2004) and Where It Went Wrong (2006).
