= Gordon Ross-Soden =

Australian rules footballer

Personal information
- Full name: Gordon Ross-Soden
- Born: 31 May 1888; St Kilda, Victoria
- Died: 20 March 1931 (aged 42); Salamaua, Papua New Guinea
- Original team: Melbourne Grammar

Playing career^{1}
Years	Club	Games (Goals)
1906	Essendon	1 (0)
- ^{1} Playing statistics correct to the end of 1906.

Gordon Ross-Soden (31 May 1888 – 20 March 1931) was an Australian rules footballer who played with Essendon in the Victorian Football League (VFL).
