= Awake (TV series) =

American police procedural fantasy drama television series

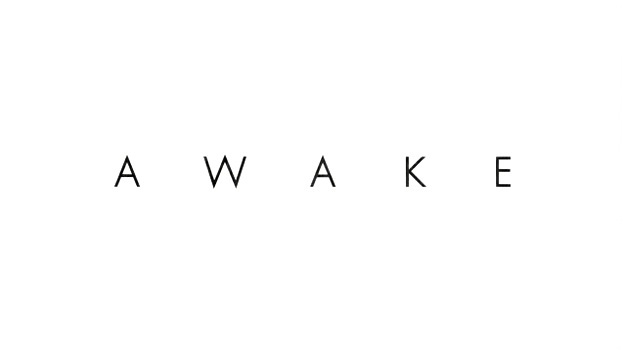
- Genre: Police procedural; Fantasy; Thriller
- Created by: Kyle Killen
- Starring: Jason Isaacs; Laura Allen; Steve Harris; Dylan Minnette; B.D. Wong; Michaela McManus; Wilmer Valderrama; Cherry Jones
- Composers: Reinhold Heil; Johnny Klimek
- Country of origin: United States
- Original language: English
- No. of seasons: 1
- No. of episodes: 13

Production
- Executive producers: Howard Gordon; Kyle Killen; Jeffrey Reiner; David Slade
- Producers: Jason Isaacs; Keith Redmon; Ed Milkovich; Michael Klick
- Cinematography: Feliks Parnell; Jo Willems
- Editors: Paul Trejo; Todd Desrosiers; Rick Tuber; Nick Berrisford; Jordan Goldman
- Camera setup: Single-camera
- Running time: 43 minutes
- Production companies: Letter Eleven; Teakwood Lane Productions; 20th Century Fox Television

Original release
- Network: NBC
- Release: March 1 – May 24, 2012

Awake is an American police procedural fantasy drama television series that originally aired on NBC for one season from March 1 to May 24, 2012. The pilot episode had an early release on Hulu on February 16, 2012, two weeks before the series' premiere on television. Kyle Killen, the series' creator, was primarily responsible for the program's concept. Killen and David Slade served as executive producers of the pilot episode, and Killen continued producing the series along with Jeffrey Reiner and Howard Gordon.

The show's central character is Michael Britten (Jason Isaacs), a detective who works for the Los Angeles Police Department. In the first episode, Michael, his wife Hannah (Laura Allen), and their son Rex (Dylan Minnette) get into a serious car accident. After the accident, he finds himself switching between two "realities" whenever he goes to bed—one in which Hannah was killed in the accident and one in which Rex died instead—and is unable to determine which reality is true. He uses details from each reality to solve cases in the other.

Awake garnered critical praise, particularly for Isaacs' performance. However, its ratings were low, averaging 4.8 million viewers per episode and sitting in 125th place in viewership for the 2011–12 season. The series was canceled after one season.

== Series overview ==
Michael Britten, a detective with the Los Angeles Police Department (LAPD), and his family are involved in a car accident. After the crash, Michael is confronted with two separate realities. His wife Hannah has (apparently) survived the accident; however, in a second "reality", his son Rex survives instead. To distinguish the two realities, Michael wears a red wristband in the first reality and a green one in the second. For the viewer, the "red" reality is graded in warm tones and the "green" reality in cool tones. Michael does not know which "reality", if either, is real; he has therapy sessions with Dr. Jonathan Lee in the "red reality" and Dr. Judith Evans in the "green", both of whom attempt to diagnose what is happening to Michael. Each therapist sees it as a coping mechanism, insisting that the other reality is a dream. Dr. Lee is confrontational about the accident, while Dr. Evans is more nurturing. In the "red reality" Hannah plans to move to Portland, Oregon, but later decides against it (partly due to Michael's objections).

Before the crash Michael worked with his long-time partner, Detective Isaiah Freeman (known to his LAPD team as "Bird"). After the accident, Michael is assigned to Detective Efrem Vega in the "red reality." Vega was previously an officer, when Bird was transferred to the western division to work with Detective Ed Hawkins. In the "green reality," Michael stays with Bird and Efrem remains an officer. While working on cases in both realities, Michael begins to realize that the details of one case can help him with another case in the other reality. Due to this, he often clashes with his partners, who are unaware of his situation. Rex and Hannah grieve each other's death after the accident, coping in different ways: In the "red reality" Hannah begins to redecorate the house, while in the "green reality" Rex begins to play tennis with Hannah's former partner Tara. In "Turtles All the Way Down", in a dream Michael sees Hannah at a restaurant. He was "dreaming while he was dreaming", and Hannah told Michael to give her "one last kiss goodbye". This causes Dr. Evans to note that Michael realizes the "green reality" is life. However, soon afterwards Michael sees Rex and Hannah together and is happy.

Detective Hawkins ran me off the road and destroyed my family. He's the reason we will never all be together again.

— Michael Britten ("Two Birds")

Details surrounding the accident are slowly revealed as the series progresses. Shortly after the crash, Michael's commanding officers (Tricia Harper and Carl Kessel) meet to talk about the accident and how they set up a "short" guy. Later a microphone at Ricky's Tacos speaks to Michael, claiming that if he moved to Portland he would "never know the truth". Michael slowly begins to remember what happened in the accident; after realizing that Ed caused it, he speaks with Dr. Evans and Dr. Lee. His therapists insist that he is imagining it all to help cope with the pain. However, when Michael later breaks into Ed's house Ed admits that he and an accomplice were hiding heroin at the Westfield Distribution Center; "they decided he had to go", after Michael began to uncover it. Michael does not know who "they" are, demanding that Ed tell him. Ed asks for protection before telling him, and attacks Michael when he is distracted. During the struggle, Michael kills Ed, and Bird comes into the house after speaking to Dr. Evans. Michael later discovers that Carl and Tricia are involved in the setup. Tricia shoots Carl in the "green reality" (in an attempt to hide her involvement in the accident), but is later imprisoned. At the end of the series finale "Turtles All the Way Down", Michael sees Hannah and Rex together. Concerned about his odd behavior, they ask if he is all right. Michael replies, "I'm perfect," and closes his eyes.

== Characters ==
Main cast of Awake
| Actor | Character | Reality | |
|---|---|---|---|
| Jason Isaacs | Detective Michael Britten | Red | Green |
| Laura Allen | Hannah Britten | Red | Red |
| Steve Harris | Detective Isaiah "Bird" Freeman | Green | Green |
| Dylan Minnette | Rex Britten | Green | Green |
| BD Wong | Dr. Jonathan Lee | Red | Red |
| Michaela McManus | Tara | Green | Green |
| Wilmer Valderrama | Detective Efrem Vega | Red | Red |
| Cherry Jones | Dr. Judith Evans | Green | Green |

=== Main characters ===
Michael Britten (the lead character) is an LAPD detective who lives in both realities. Since he does not know which reality is "real", he has routines to help him maintain the illusion of control; however, he is also disorganized and sometimes behaves oddly. Michael is often confused, suffers from a sleep disorder and dislikes heights. He refuses treatment because he does not want closure for his family. Hannah Britten is Michael's wife, who is grieving her son's death. Rex Britten is Michael's son, a teenage student who had previously been kidnapped. After school Rex often works on a motorbike with his best friend, Cole, at Cole's house. He is emotional and angry over his mother's death, keeping a tennis racket to deal with his grief. When Cole accidentally breaks it, Rex is enraged; later, he apologizes.

Efrem Vega (a detective in the "red reality") and Michael often argue about their cases, and is concerned about Michael's erratic behavior. In "The Little Guy", Vega and Michael are arguing about a case involving a short person when Captain Tricia Harper calls Michael into her office. Shortly afterwards, Michael puts Vega on the lead of a new case and the two become friends. Michael had previously worked with Bird in the "red reality," but Bird is reassigned to a new division. Vega remains an officer in the "green reality" Bird and Michael now only work with each other as partners in the "green reality." Michael sees two therapists: Dr. Jonathan Lee and Dr. Judith Evans. Dr. Lee claims that Michael's two realities are problematic, and Dr. Evans states that they are "remarkable".

=== Recurring characters ===
There are five recurring characters, all appearing in both realities. Captain Tricia Harper, Michael's commanding officer at the precinct, was a co-conspirator in Michael's car accident; however, it is hinted that her involvement was reluctant. Captain Carl Kessel (commanding officer at Hawkins' precinct) hid heroin in a storage unit for himself and Harper, and was behind Michael's car accident. For the crash the two used Ed Hawkins, on orders from Kessel.

Other recurring characters include Emma (Daniela Bobadilla), Rex's girlfriend. Pregnant with Rex's baby, she was originally told to give it up for adoption; however, after a talk with her father Joaquin (Carlos Lacámara) she is allowed to keep it. Cole, Rex's best friend, is another recurring character. The two work on a motorbike together; Cole lets Hannah ride it in the "red reality", after she convinces him to finish it.

== Episodes ==
| No. | Title | Directed by | Written by | Original release date | Prod. code | US viewers (millions) |
|---|---|---|---|---|---|---|
| 1 | "Pilot" | David Slade | Kyle Killen | February 16, 2012 (Online); March 1, 2012 (NBC) | 1ATR79 | 6.24 |
Michael Britten (Jason Isaacs) and his family are involved in a fatal accident. In one reality, in which he wears a green wrist band, his wife Hannah Britten (Laura Allen) was killed in the crash, and in another reality, in which he wears a red wrist band, his son Rex Britten (Dylan Minnette) was the one killed. Michael does not know which reality is real. He sees two separate therapists: Dr. John Lee (BD Wong) in the "red reality", and Dr. Judith Evans (Cherry Jones) in the "green reality", and works with two separate partners: Efrem Vega (Wilmer Valderrama) in one reality and partner Isaiah "Bird" Freeman (Steve Harris) in the other. Michael deals with a kidnapped girl in his "green reality", and a murder in his "red reality".
| 2 | "The Little Guy" | Jeffrey Reiner | Kyle Killen | March 8, 2012 | 1ATR01 | 4.33 |
Michael deals with a case of the death of a homeless man, Bernard Mackenzie. Meanwhile, Hannah and Rex try to deal with each other's death in their respective realities, while Tricia Harper (Laura Innes), Michael's captain, shows growing concern over his behavior.
| 3 | "Guilty" | Jeffrey Reiner | Howard Gordon & Evan Katz | March 15, 2012 | 1ATR02 | 5.12 |
Rex gets kidnapped by John Cooper (Clifton Powell), an escaped convict that Michael arrested 10 years ago; an investigation in Michael's other reality gets in the way of an event honoring his deceased son; clues from both realities lead to Michael's sanity being questioned. Michael's retired partner Jim Mayhew (William Russ) is called in to help with the case, until Michael learns that he actually framed Cooper.
| 4 | "Kate Is Enough" | Sarah Pia Anderson | Kyle Killen | March 22, 2012 | 1ATR08 | 4.73 |
While investigating an alleged suicide during an upscale yacht party with Detective Vega, Michael runs into Rex's former babysitter Kate (Brianna Brown). Later, in a case where Michael is investigating with Bird, Kate appears again, this time as a suspect. Dr. Lee and Dr. Evans try to help him make sense of his run ins with these two very different versions of the same woman.
| 5 | "Oregon" | Aaron Lipstadt | Lisa Zwerling | March 29, 2012 | 1ATR03 | 3.18 |
Michael suddenly becomes a suspect in his own case when FBI agent, Elizabeth Santoro (Megan Dodds), questions his methods of tracking down a serial killer thought to be dead. Meanwhile, in the wake of her son's death, Hannah finds comfort in exploring the possibility of moving to Oregon and going back to school. The serial killer, Gemini, contacts Michael at the end of the episode.
| 6 | "That's Not My Penguin" | Scott Winant | Kyle Killen & Noelle Valdivia | April 5, 2012 | 1ATR04 | 2.56 |
While working a hostage situation with Vega, Michael unexpectedly finds himself collaborating with Dr. Lee. In an effort to calm down Gabriel Wyath (Billy Lush) – a patient who has threatened to blow up a mental hospital – Michael is compromised, and the effects follow him into his other reality. Meanwhile, Rex introduces his girlfriend, Emma, to his dad, and Bird shows concern over Michael's lack of focus due to his sleepless nights.
| 7 | "Ricky's Tacos" | Adam Davidson | Story by : Kyle Killen; Teleplay by : Howard Gordon & Evan Katz | April 12, 2012 | 1ATR05 | 2.68 |
In the "red reality", the Brittens continue with their plan to move to Portland, Oregon. Michael goes to fast food restaurant Ricky's Tacos, where the voice at the drive-thru says that he cannot go to Portland, and "it all starts with the Westfield case". However, he fails to find anything unusual about the case; his curiosity worries Captain Harper.
| 8 | "Nightswimming" | Jeffrey Reiner | Leonard Chang & Davey Holmes | April 19, 2012 | 1ATR06 | 2.80 |
While helping a couple to prepare for a new life within the witness protection program, Michael finds himself preparing for a new life in Oregon with Hannah. Meanwhile, Detective Vega is introduced to Jake (Steve Lawrence), Michael's longtime confidential informant who does not get along with Vega.
| 9 | "Game Day" | Michael Waxman | Howard Gordon & David Graziano | April 26, 2012 | 1ATR07 | 2.21 |
In his "red reality", Michael deals with a case of a football fan found dead on the ground. In his "green reality", Michael deals with a case with a burning building with a girl in it at the time of the fire. Meanwhile, Rex deals with his girlfriend Emma (Daniela Bobadilla) and a secret she is keeping, while Michael's partner Efrem Vega plans a party for Michael's moving to Oregon.
| 10 | "Slack Water" | Nick Gomez | Noelle Valdivia | May 3, 2012 | 1ATR09 | 2.15 |
Michael and Bird are investigating what seems to be a case of gang violence. However, the clues shown to Michael in another reality suggests something deeper. Meanwhile, Hannah is trying to talk through a tough situation with Rex's girlfriend Emma.
| 11 | "Say Hello to My Little Friend" | Laura Innes | Kyle Killen & Leonard Chang | May 10, 2012 | 1ATR10 | 2.51 |
Michael passes out during a bungee jump when he is with Rex. He is unable to switch realities, and realizes that Detective Ed Hawkins (Kevin Weisman), a cop at his station, was trying to kill him, after Michael saw Hawkins as a hallucination. Meanwhile, Hannah asks Michael to speak to Emma's father, Joaquin (Carlos LaCamara), so Joaquin can more sympathetic about Emma's pregnancy.
| 12 | "Two Birds" | Milan Cheylov | Story by : Evan Katz; Teleplay by : Howard Gordon & Davey Holmes | May 17, 2012 | 1ATR11 | 2.10 |
Michael learns more about the truth of the accident. He tries to get evidence that Hawkins tried to kill him, and finds out that Hawkins' commanding officer Carl Kessel (Mark Harelik) was also in on this setup. Bird helps Michael in both realities, despite questioning Michael's sanity. He is killed by Ed Hawkins in the "red reality". Meanwhile, when Vega is questioned about his partner, he begins to doubt Captain Harper's intentions, and Hannah and Rex are worried about Michael's behavior.
| 13 | "Turtles All the Way Down" | Miguel Sapochnik | Story by : Kyle Killen & Leonard Chang & Noelle Valdivia; Teleplay by : Kyle Killen | May 23, 2012 (Global); May 24, 2012 (NBC) | 1ATR12 | 2.87 |
Captain Harper kills Captain Kessel in a hotel room to hide her involvement in the accident. Meanwhile, Michael starts to realize the truth behind the accident; a conspiracy threatens both of his realities; Michael goes after Hawkins; Dr. Lee and Dr. Evans come together in a debate that forces Michael to choose a path.

== Production ==
=== Development ===
Killen devised the concept of the program, drawing inspiration from the dreaming process: "The concept of the way your dreams feel real, the way you seem to experience them as something that you don't blink at until something crazy happens that sort of bursts that balloon. I think I became interested in the question of what if nothing ever popped that balloon? What if you couldn't tell the difference between when you were awake and when you were asleep? And then I started looking for a way to marry those two ideas up, and a few months later we had Awake." After being turned down by Fox, the pilot (then titled REM) was picked up by NBC in 2011, and the series was green-lit shortly thereafter.

=== Production team ===
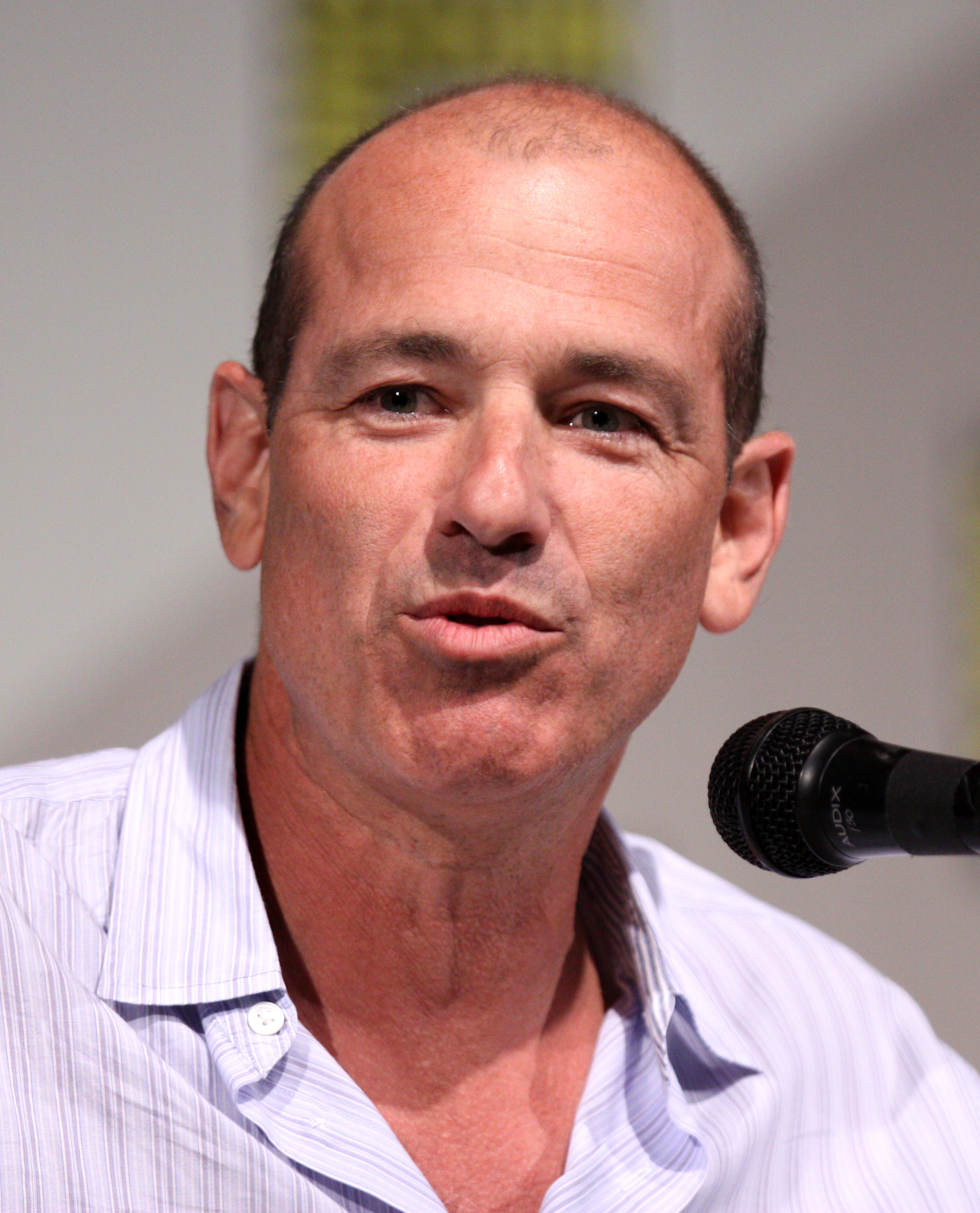
Howard Gordon was chosen as showrunner for the series.

Awake was a co-production of Letter Eleven and Howard Gordon's Teakwood Lane Productions, in association with 20th Century Fox Television. Gordon served as showrunner for the series, while Killen wrote several episodes of the show. Jason Isaacs, Keith Redmon, Ed Milkovich and Michael Klick produced the show. Editors of the show were Paul Trejo and Nikc Berrisford. Feliks Parnell was the show's primary cinematographer; principal photography for the pilot was completed at Fox Studios in Los Angeles, California.

=== Casting ===
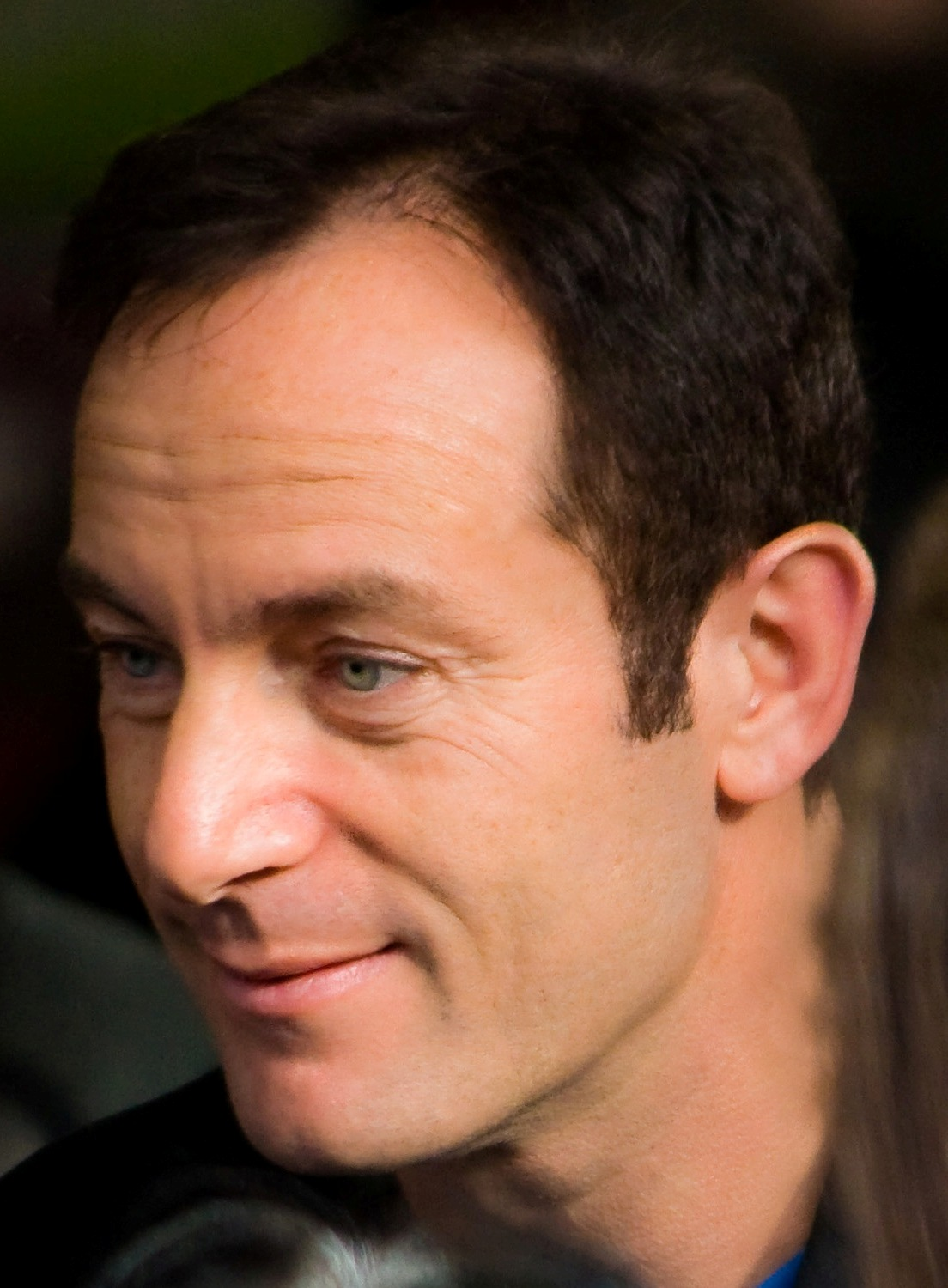
Jason Isaacs was the first actor to be cast in the series.

Isaacs was the first actor to be cast in the series, playing the role of the central character Michael Britten. "[The main character] was somebody that you couldn't decide if you liked or hated, and I think that [Michael]'s dilemma is something that we're not only sympathetic for, but somehow we want him to win." Producers of the show initially approached Michaela McManus to play Hannah Britten. However, Laura Allen was cast instead; McManus obtained the role of Tara (for which Allen originally auditioned).

Dylan Minnette was cast as Rex Britten, Michael's son. He stated, "The process of getting the job actually went by really fast because the first audition Kyle Killen[...]was in the room, Jason [Isaacs] was in the room, the cast director was in the room and the director was in the room. David Slade. And they were all there, for the first audition and I was like 'Wow! Okay.'" Minnette received the role two weeks after his audition. Other cast members included Wilmer Valderrama and Steve Harris as Michael's partner in each reality, while Cherry Jones and BD Wong's characters were cast as Michael's therapists in separate realities. Wong left his role on Law & Order: Special Victims Unit to join the cast of Awake. Laura Innes and Kevin Weismand had recurring roles as members of LAPD.

=== Writing ===
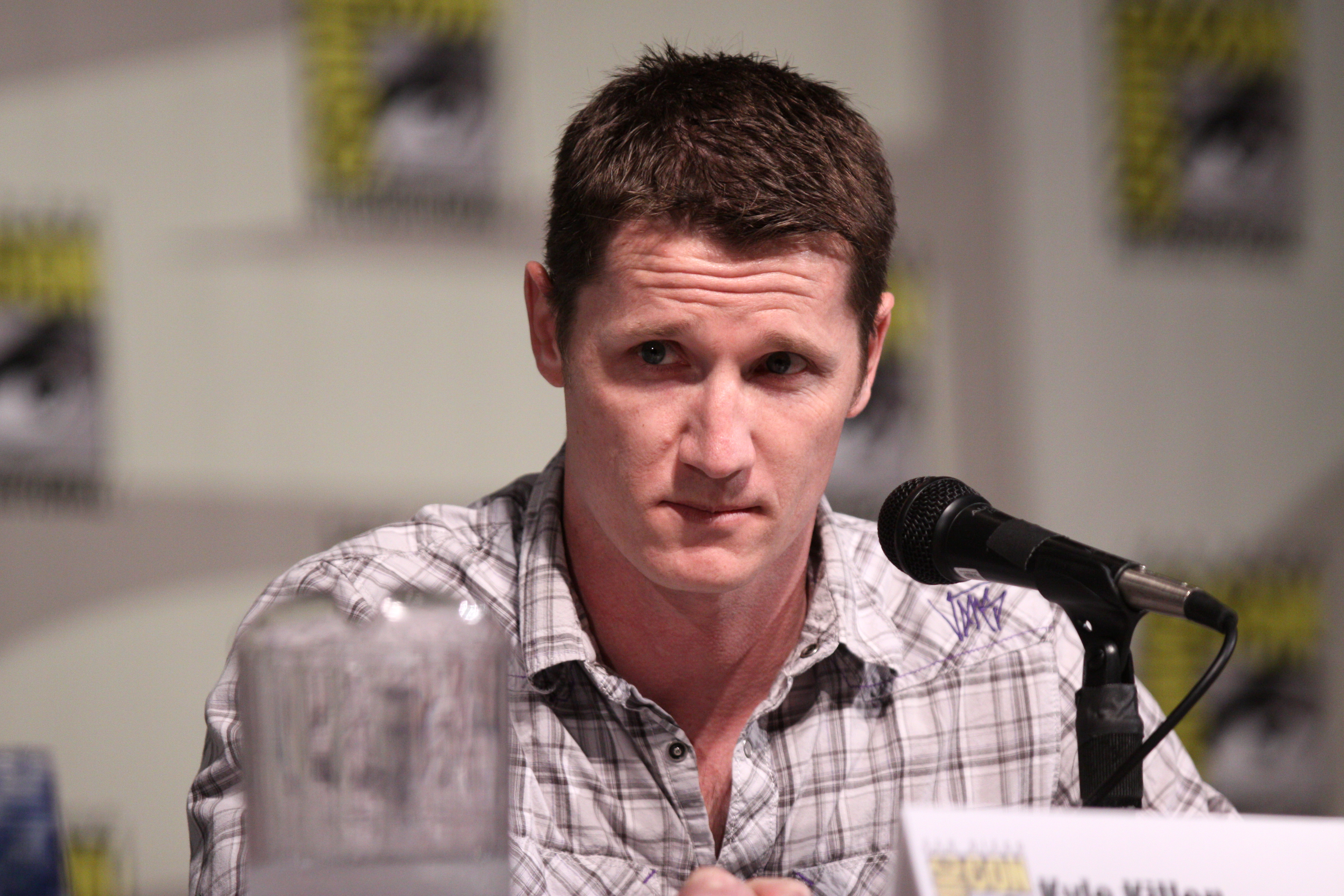
Kyle Killen created outlines for the script and distinguished them in green and red ink.

Killen said that writing the pilot episode's script was one of the more-difficult components of creating the show. He and his writing team would often get confused with exchanging and executing ideas for the script; as a result they created outlines, distinguishing the separate realities with green or red ink. Slade edited the language to better separate the ideas. Stating that things are "initially confusing to us when we are just trying to break story," he hoped that when viewers watched the pilot episode, they would be immediately oriented in the reality on screen at the time.

== Reception ==
=== Critical response ===
On Rotten Tomatoes, the series holds an approval rating of 81% based on 31 reviews, with an average rating of 7.6/10. The website's critical consensus reads: "Intelligent and thought-provoking, Awake tempts audiences with an original and complex concept that keeps them guessing."

Awake drew strong reviews for its pilot. Rachel Ray of The Daily Telegraph called the premiere episode "impressive", while NPR's Linda Holmes said that it laid the foundation for several emotional storylines, evaluating it among the strongest shows in recent memory. James Poniewozik of Time noted that while its concept seemed melodramatic, the episode "focuses unflinchingly on the subject of loss, yet manages to be not a downer or painful to watch, but moving, absorbing and even hopeful."

Isaacs' performance garnered praise throughout the run of the series. Curt Wagner of RedEye said: "his touching, solid work grounds everything. He shows viewers what lengths one man in pain might go to hold onto those he loves. And it's heartbreaking." Matt Fowler of IGN said Isaacs "delivers a graceful and subdued performance as a man who, on a daily basis, must taste both heaven and hell. A man full of guilt, but also gratitude." Some critics called for Isaacs to receive an Emmy Award.

In contrast, some viewers were unimpressed with Awake. Writing for The Washington Post, Hank Stuever felt that despite high ambitions the pilot episode was slow and drowsy. Certain episodes were singled out for particularly poor quality: "Game Day" was called "childishly simple", "Ricky's Tacos" was criticized for too closely resembling Law & Order: Special Victims Unit, and "Nightswimming" was described as uneven and boring.

=== US television ratings ===
Awake had low viewership and ratings throughout its original run. The premiere episode started strong, becoming the most-viewed program in its time slot for NBC in almost two years. but its second episode fell by two million viewers, and overall the show averaged 4.81 million viewers per episode, ranking 125th in viewership for the 2011–12 season.

U.S. television ratings for Awake
| No. | Title | Original air date | 18–49 rating | % share | U.S. viewers (in millions) | Time slot rank | Ref. |
|---|---|---|---|---|---|---|---|
| 1 | "Pilot" | March 1, 2012 | 2.0 | 5% | 6.24 | 1st | |
| 2 | "The Little Guy" | March 8, 2012 | 1.6 | 4% | 4.33 | 2nd | |
| 3 | "Guilty" | March 15, 2012 | 1.6 | 4% | 5.12 | 2nd | |
| 4 | "Kate Is Enough" | March 22, 2012 | 1.2 | 3% | 4.73 | 2nd | |
| 5 | "Oregon" | March 29, 2012 | 1.0 | 3% | 3.18 | 2nd | |
| 6 | "That's Not My Penguin" | April 5, 2012 | 0.9 | 3% | 2.56 | 3rd | |
| 7 | "Ricky's Tacos" | April 12, 2012 | 0.9 | 2% | 2.68 | 3rd | |
| 8 | "Nightswimming" | April 19, 2012 | 0.9 | 2% | 2.80 | 3rd | |
| 9 | "Game Day" | April 26, 2012 | 0.8 | 2% | 2.21 | 3rd | |
| 10 | "Slack Water" | May 3, 2012 | 0.7 | 2% | 2.15 | 3rd | |
| 11 | "Say Hello to My Little Friend" | May 10, 2012 | 0.9 | 2% | 2.51 | 3rd | |
| 12 | "Two Birds" | May 17, 2012 | 0.7 | 2% | 2.10 | 3rd | |
| 13 | "Turtles All the Way Down" | May 24, 2012 | 0.9 | 3% | 2.87 | 3rd | |

=== Awards and accolades ===
In June 2011 Awake was honored, along with seven others, with the Critics' Choice Television Award for Most Exciting New Series, chosen by journalists who had seen the pilots. ET Online chose Isaacs as its first actor in their annual Emmy Preview, which predicts winners of particular Emmy Awards. ET Online reviewer Jarett Wieselman noted that Isaacs could receive an Outstanding Lead Actor in a Drama Series nomination; however, Isaacs was not on the list of nominees announced July 19, 2012.

== Distribution ==
Awake was originally broadcast on NBC in the United States. It aired on the Global Television Network in Canada, on W in Australia, and on Sky Atlantic in the United Kingdom and Ireland. Fox Channel Asia picked up the rights to air the series in Asia.

== Broadcast history ==
Awake consists of thirteen one-hour episodes. The series originally aired in the United States on Thursdays at 10:00pm from March 1 to May 24, 2012 on NBC. The series was a mid-season replacement for The Firm, which moved to Saturday nights. The series' final episode, "Turtles All the Way Down", aired outside the television season on May 24, 2012. Low ratings resulted in NBC's cancelling the show on May 11, 2012 (after eleven of the thirteen produced episodes were aired), although the network finished airing the remaining episodes in the series' original time slot.

== Adaptation ==
A Russian adaptation of the series, Awakening, starred Yevgeniy Mironov in the main role; it debuted in 2021.

== See also ==
- Ordinary Joe, a television series with a similar alternative timeline premise
