= Maura Soden =

American actress, producer

- Born: Maura Anne Soden; Richmond, Virginia, U.S.
- Occupation: Actress
- Years active: Mid 1980s—present
- Spouse: Michael Loftus
- Children: 1

Maura Anne Soden is an American actress and producer.

== Early life ==
Soden was born in Richmond, Virginia, where she attended an all-girls catholic high school, Saint Gertrude High School.

== Career ==
Soden has worked as a casting director, writer, stylist, actress and producer and she is a member of SAG, AFTRA, Actor's Equity, Women In Film and National Academy of Television Arts and Sciences. Soden spent time working in each show business genre from sitcoms to reality shows to commercials.

Soden worked as an assistant to director Paul Bogart on NBC's The Golden Girls and later as a post production supervisor on Fox's Totally Hidden Video. She was a staff producer at InFinnity Productions, Pat Finn's production company. She later moved to Wild West Media as a commercial producer.

Soden also worked as the Production Manager for Animal Planet's series, That's My Baby.

In 2002, her short film, Rush of the Palms (2001), won Best Short in the Festival Internacional de Cinema de Catalunya. Her documentary, Forgotten Grave, won the best film in its category at the Zoie Film Festival and on ifilm.com. She also shared a NIMA award for best infomercial production for "Jack Nicklaus' Golden Bear Putter."

She has been seen on stage in regional and dinner theatre productions, been on many radio spots and been seen on numerous television shows. Soden has appeared in over 25 national commercials and as a regular on Candid Camera, thirtysomething, Totally Hidden Video and Passions. Her most recent credits include Boston Public and the 2004 CBS film, Helter Skelter. She currently has two commercials airing for Detrol and Tropicana Twister.

In 2001, Maura Soden and her husband founded AdVerb, Inc., a Los Angeles-based production company. She is currently the Los Angeles partner for Story Teller Pictures.

In 2005, she guest-starred in Criminal Minds in the Season 1 episode, Blood Hungry as Deputy Jackie Long who helps the BAU track down a psychotic serial killer whose main motive is anthropophagy (cannibalism).

== Personal life ==
Soden is married to Michael Loftus, with whom she has one daughter.

== Filmography ==
- It's a Living (1985)
- Alfred Hitchcock Presents (1986)
- Webster (1986)
- Benson (1986)
- thirtysomething (1987–1988)
- Murderous Vision (1991) (TV)
- Frankenstein: The College Years (1991) (TV)
- Major Dad (1992)
- Lady Boss (1992) (TV)
- Murphy Brown (1993)
- Darkness Before Dawn (1993) (TV)
- Weird Science (1994)
- Matlock (1994)
- Guideposts Junction (1995)
- Beverly Hills, 90210 (1996)
- L.A. Doctors (1998)
- The Bold and the Beautiful (1999)
- Providence (1999)
- Kissing Jake (1999)
- American Pie (1999)
- Freaks and Geeks (1999)
- The Geena Davis Show (2000)
- Three Sisters (2001)
- The X-Files (2001)
- Passions (2002)
- Spy TV (2002)
- Boston Public (2003)
- Six Feet Under (2004)
- Helter Skelter (2004) (TV)
- Malcolm in the Middle (2004)
- Criminal Minds (2005)
- Medium (2005)
- Boston Legal (2005)
- Desperate Housewives (2006)
- Mad Men (2007)
- Las Vegas (2007)
- Heartland (2007)
- ER (2007)
- Ugly Betty (2007)
- Brothers & Sisters (2008–2009)
- NCIS (2010)
- United States of Tara (2010)
- Make It or Break It (2010)
- Castle (2011)
- Scandal (2012)
- Harry's Law (2012)
- Awake (2012)
- Grey's Anatomy (2012)
- Parenthood (2012)
- Justified (2012)
- 1600 Penn (2013)
- Parks and Recreation (2014)
- Rake (2014)
- New Girl (2018)
