= East Coast Surfing Championships =

Annual surfing competition in Virginia, United States

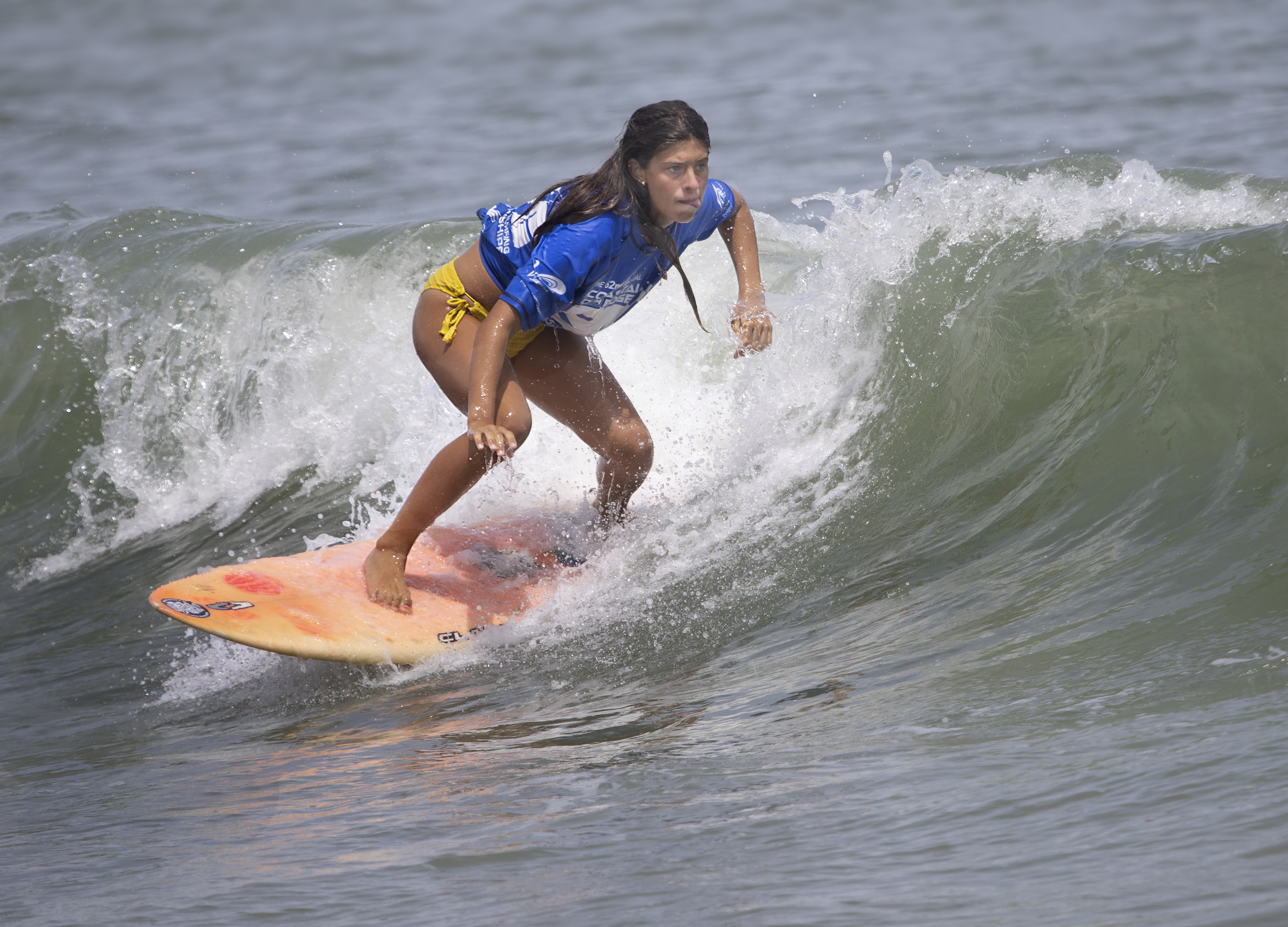
2024 East Coast Surfing Championships

The East Coast Surfing Championships (ECSC) is an annual surfing contest held in late August in Virginia Beach, Virginia on the oceanfront, and is one of the United States Surfing Federation's major amateur events.

The event originated in a summer 1962 beach and surf party organized by a group of teens at Gilgo Beach on Long Island, New York. It moved to Virginia Beach the following year, and is now the longest-running surfing contest in the world and a major source of tax revenue for Virginia Beach, attracting more than 100,000 people a year. In 2011, the Association of Surfing Professionals designated the pro division a 4-star event and the junior division a 4-star junior qualifying event. The 2020 ECSC was not canceled because of the COVID-19 pandemic, but took place with health precautions including live-streaming. However, the 2020 and 2021 events were not World Surf League qualifying series championships. In 2022, a women's World Surf League qualifying series event was added.

Men's and women's professional and amateur surfing events are held throughout the week, plus other beach sporting events such as volleyball, a 5k oceanfront run, and a swimsuit competition. The ECSC also includes live music, BMX, skateboarding and skimboarding exhibitions, and in some years freestyle motocross.

The ECSC is organized by the Virginia Beach Jaycees, a chapter of the United States Jaycees; its primary sponsor is Coastal Edge Surf Shop, which became name sponsor in 2013. The Jaycees established the ECSC Legends Hall of Fame awards in 2005.

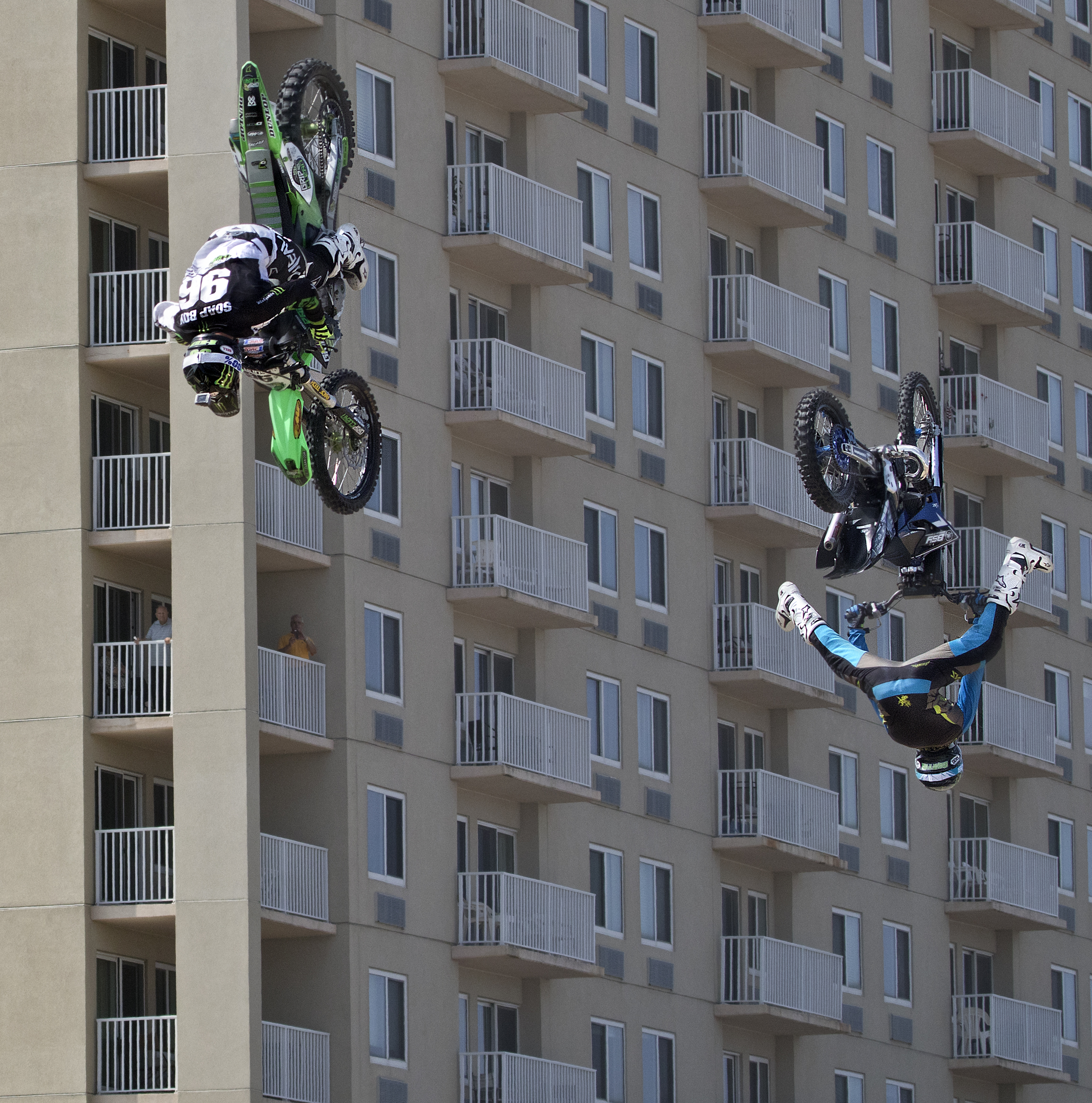
Freestyle motocross at the 2017 ECSC

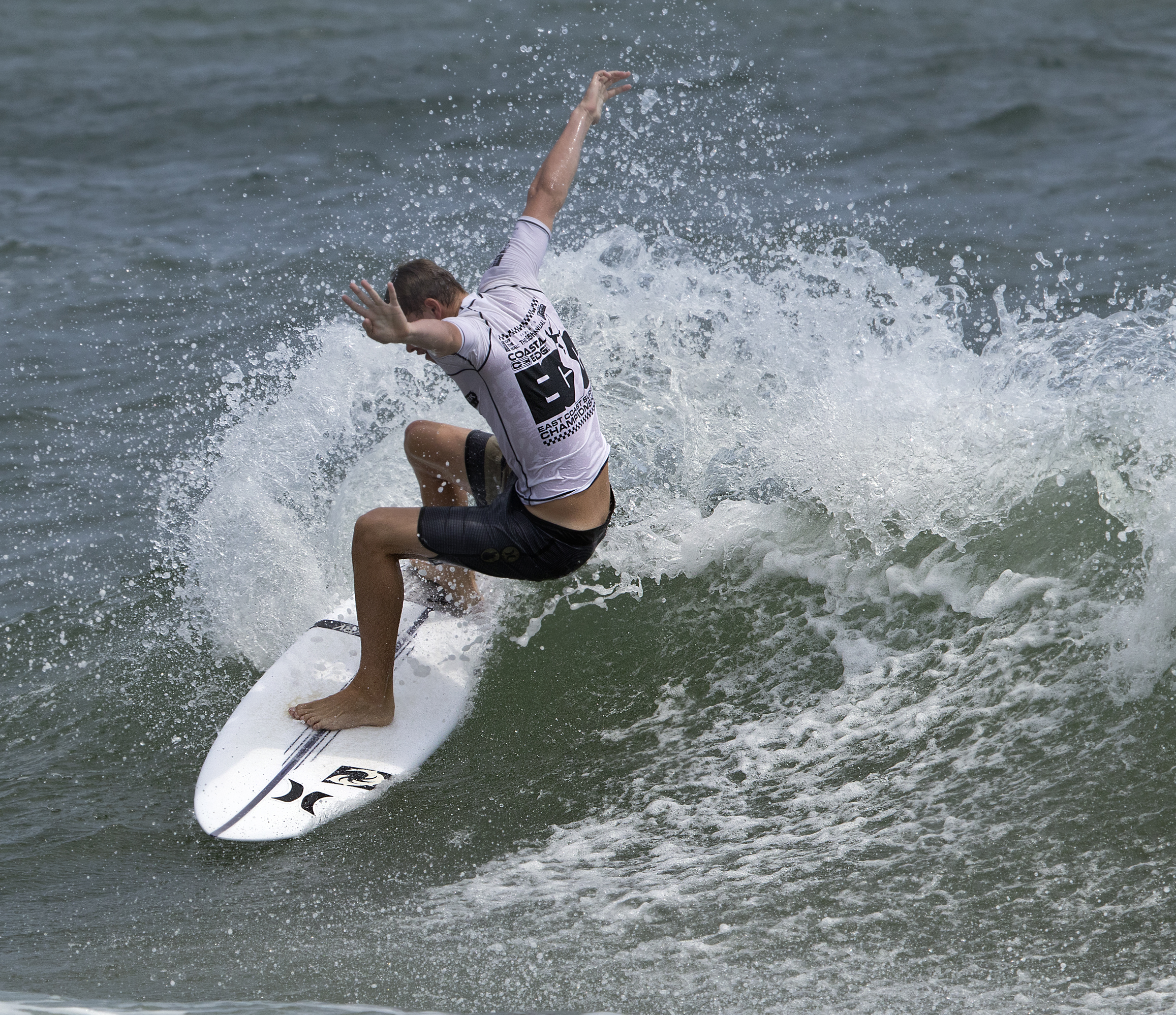
2017 ECSC

== Past winners ==
Open/pro
Year	Men
1963	Jack Roland Murphy
1964	John Eakes
1965	D. W. Carter
1966	Gary Propper
1967	Steve Bigler
1968	Corky Carroll
1969	Joe Roland
1970	Dennis Doyle
1971	Dennis Doyle
1972	Jimbo Brothers
1973	Yancy Spencer III
1974	Jeff Arensman
1975	Bennett Strickland
1976	Kim Hickman
1977	Kim Hickman
1978	Dave Nuckles
1979	Allen White
1980	Wes Laine
1981	Wes Laine
1982	Buddy Pelletier
1983	Matt Kechele
1984	John Futch
1985	Richie Rudolph
1986	Richie Rudolph
1987	Scott McCranels
1988	Scott McCranels
1989	Steve Anest
1990	David Speir
1991	Alan Burke
1992	Matt Kechele
1993	Shane Stoneland
1994	Jeff Deffenbaugh
1995	John Logan
1996	Ryan Simmons
1997	Danilo Costa
1998	Tom Curren
1999	Taylor Knox
2000	Marco Polo
2001	Bryan Hewitson
2002	Dino Andino
2003	Jason Reagan
2004	Eric Taylor
2005	Aaron Cormican
2006	Aaron Cormican
2007	Aaron Cormican
2008	Asher Nolan
2009	Aaron Cormican
2010	Jeremy Johnston
2011	Kolohe Andino
2012	Jean Da Silva
2013	Patrick Gudauskas
2014	Michael Dunphy
2015	Kanoa Igarashi
2016	Evan Geiselman
2017	Keanu Asing
2018	Hiroto Ohhara
2019	Luke Gordon
2020	Noah Schweizer
2021	Dylan Hord
2022	Jett Schilling
2023	Kolohe Andino
2024	Blayr Barton
