= Nika Khanjani =

Iranian-Canadian writer and video artist

- نیکا خانجانی
- Born: Iran
- Education: University of Texas at Austin, Concordia University
- Known for: Video art, writing
- Notable work: Free World Pen, Current, Copyright
- Website: www.nikakhanjani.com

Nika Khanjani (Persian: نیکا خانجانی), is an Iranian-Canadian writer and video artist based in Montreal.

She began making short experimental and essay films in 2006. Her titles include Free World Pens (2015), Iran to Texas (2011), Texas, My Brother, and Me (2009), Current (2007), Copyright (2006), and Montreal spring, shrouded in mist (2012).

Khanjani is a follower of the Baháʼí Faith. Her family and friends in Iran have been tortured by the government for decades because of their faith and its perceived anti-Iranian sentiment. Many have received asylum in the United States.

She explores her own memories and family history to explore broader themes of displacement and social struggle. The autobiographic poetics of her films are often contrasted with imagery of empty or sparsely populated spaces and layered soundscapes.

"The Khanjani family moved to Texas from Iran in 1979, just before the revolution. They soon felt the sting of racism as the Iran hostage crisis (dramatized in the 2012 film Argo) took hold of the American imagination."

Khanjani studied English literature at the University of Texas. She moved to New York City in the late 1990s, where she worked for the Brooklyn Film Festival. She then returned to Iran for a couple of years to teach at the "underground university" — the Baháʼí Institute for Higher Education, a school for members of the oppressed faith, Iran's largest religious minority.
