= We Were Rebels =

2014 German-South Sudanese documentary thriller film

We were Rebels
- Directed by: Florian Schewe; Katharina von Schroeder
- Written by: Christoph Lumpe; Katharina von Schroeder
- Produced by: Michael Bogar; Inka Dewitz
- Starring: Agel Ring Machar
- Cinematography: Florian Schewe; Katharina von Schroeder
- Edited by: André Nier
- Music by: Kaan Bulak
- Production company: Perfect Shot Films
- Distributed by: Taskovski Films
- Release date: 28 May 2014; (Germany)
- Running time: 93 minutes
- Country: Germany
- Languages: English; Dinka; Arabic

We were Rebels, is a 2014 German-South Sudanese documentary thriller film co-directed by Florian Schewe and Katharina von Schroeder and co-produced by Michael Bogar and Inka Dewitz for Perfect Shot Films.

The film revolves around Agel, a former child soldier who returns to South Sudan to help build up his country in a two year period from South Sudan's 2011 independence to the South Sudan civil war in December 2013.

The film made its premier on 20 August 2021. The film screened at DOK Munich 2014, IDFA Amsterdam 2014, DocPoint Helsinki 2015, Human Rights Human Wrongs Film Festival Oslo 2015, Days of European Film Prague 2015 and Nashville Film Festival 2015.

In 2015, the film won the Best Documentary Feature at the Brooklyn Film Festival. Then in the same year, the film won the Best Documentary Award at the Brooklyn International Film Festival. At the AGON International Meeting of Archaeological Film 2016, the film won the Festival Trophy for Best Documentary Film. Besides, the film was nominated for the Grand Jury Prize under Documentary Competition at the Nashville Film Festival in 2015.

== Cast ==
- Agel Ring Machar
