= Brooklyn Film Festival =

Independent film festival

- Location: New York City, United States
- Language: International
- Website: brooklynfilmfestival.org

The Brooklyn Film Festival (BFF), formerly known as the Brooklyn International Film Festival, is an independent film festival held every June in New York City, United States. The festival is organized by the Brooklyn Film Society, a 501 (c)(3) tax-exempt non-profit organization.

Started by Marco Ursino, Susan Mackell, Abe Schrager, and Mario Pegoraro in 1998, its mission is to “discover, expose, and promote independent filmmakers while drawing worldwide attention to Brooklyn as a center for cinema." Its base is South 4th Street, Williamsburg.

BFF also oversees the annual KidsFilmFest, a program that reaches out to children and families.

== Venue ==
In 2009, the festival took place at the Brooklyn Heights Cinema on Henry Street in Brooklyn Heights where two screening rooms operated side-by-side featuring 81 two-hour film programs. Nightly networking after-parties took place at various locations in DUMBO, Brooklyn. Previously, the festival has been held at Brooklyn Lyceum, Brooklyn Academy of Music (BAM), Brooklyn Museum, Steiner Studios, Brooklyn Public Library, and the Brooklyn Historical Society.

== Entries ==
Roughly half of films submitted and shown are by U.S. filmmakers, while approximately 20% are European. The remaining 30% come from other parts of the globe. In 2009, the festival received 2,780 films for consideration from 110 countries.

BFF awards filmmakers over $80,000 in prizes in the form of cash, film services, and products. It accepts around 25 feature narratives, 30 documentaries, 45 short subjects films, 20 experimental films, and 30 animated works. Over 30 screeners help BFF to review the entries, and there are 25 judges (or, five per category).

The fee for submitting films before November 30 is $30, after which fee rises to $50. Alumni filmmakers are exempt from paying this fees. The fee is also waived in several other cases. Accommodation for participating filmmakers is provided by a festival sponsor, Hotel Chandler, Manhattan.

== Winners ==
The most prestigious award given out at BFF is the Grand Chameleon for the Best Film.

=== 2011 ===
- Main Competition
  - Grand Chameleon Award: Battle for Brooklyn (Suki Hawley and Michael Galinsky)
  - Best Narrative Feature: W. Zappatore (Massimiliano Verdesca)
  - Best Documentary: Battle for Brooklyn (Suki Hawley and Michael Galinsky)
  - Best Narrative Short: Rita (Fabio Grassadonia and Antonio Piazza)
  - Best Animation: A Morning Stroll (Grant Orchard)
  - Best Experimental: Dame Factory (Melanie Abramov)
  - Best New Director: Siberia Monamour (Slava Ross)
- Spirit Awards
  - Feature Narrative: Amy George (Yonah Lewis and Calvin Thomas)
  - Documentary: Scrapper (Stephan Wassmann)
  - Short Narrative: Gowanus 83 (Michael Wood)
  - Experimental: To Be In Me (Marina Mello)
  - Animation: Amar (Isabel Herguera)
- Audience Awards
  - Feature Narrative: David (Joel Fendelman)
  - Documentary: Bed Stuy Do or Die (Daniel Bishop)
  - Short Narrative: Teardrop (Damian John Harper)
  - Experimental: Pose (Ivaylo Getov)
  - Animation: Falling Up (Djuna Wahlrab)
- Certificates of Outstanding Achievement
  - Screenplay: Anna Kerrigan (Five Days Gone)
  - Producer: S. Schaefer, D. Crespo, C. Silber (My Last Day Without You)
  - Cinematography: Magela Crosignani (Mary Marie)
  - Editing: Takashi Doscher (Snow on tha Bluff)
  - Original Score: Fall On Your Sword (Aardvark)
  - Actor Female: Marielena Logsdon (Babyland) and Sandra Milo (W. Zappatore)
  - Actor Male: Rasselas Lakew (The Athlete)

=== 2010 ===
- Main Competition
  - Grand Chameleon Award: The Minutemen Movie (Corey Wascinski)
  - Best Narrative Feature: Gabi on the Roof in July (Lawrence Michael Levinea)
  - Best Documentary: The Minutemen Movie (Corey Wascinski)
  - Best Narrative Short: Naissances (Anne Émond)
  - Best Animation: Sputnik 5 (Susanna Nicchiarelli)
  - Best Experimental: Necessary Games (Sophie Hyde)
  - Best New Director: Bad Day to Go Fishing (Alvaro Brechner)
- Spirit Awards
  - Feature Narrative: Bummer Summer (Zach Weintraub)
  - Documentary: Survival Song (Yu Guangyi)
  - Short Narrative: Autopilot (J.B. Herndon)
  - Experimental: Lucky Girl (Alexandra Grimanis)
  - Animation: Miramare (Michaela Muller)
- Audience Awards
  - Feature Narrative: Colin Hearts Kay (Sebastian Conley)
  - Documentary: Being in the World (Tao Ruspoli)
  - Short Narrative: Mosquito (Jeremy Engle)
  - Experimental: Noise (Esther Löwe)
  - Animation: The Bellies (Philippe Grammaticopoulos)
- Certificates of Outstanding Achievement
  - Screenplay: Alli Haapasalo (On Thin Ice)
  - Producer: Feliks Pastusiak (The Dark House)
  - Cinematography: Zoran Popovic (Redland)
  - Editing: Sabastian Conley (Colin Hearts Kay)
  - Original Score: Brandon Seabrook (A Different Bunny)
  - Actor Female: Sophia Takal (Gabi on the Roof in July)
  - Actor Male: Oscar van Rompay (Win/Win)

=== 2009 ===
- Main Competition
  - Grand Chameleon Award: Breaking Upwards (Daryl Wein)
  - Best Narrative Feature: Breaking Upwards (Daryl Wein)
  - Best Documentary: The Hillside Crowd (Berni Goldblat)
  - Best Short: The Chambermaid (Ann Holmgren)
  - Best Animation: Passages (Marie-Josee Saint-Pierre)
  - Best Experimental: Soaring Roaring Diving (Miriam Harris and Juliet Palmer)
  - Best New Director: Knife Point (Carlo Mirabella-Davis)
- Spirit Awards
  - Feature Narrative: Dr. Alemán (Tom Schreiber)
  - Documentary: Sari Soldiers (Julie Bridgham)
  - Short Narrative: The Dinner (J.B. Herndon)
  - Experimental: Naiade (Nadia Micault and Lorenzo Nanni)
  - Animation: Trickster (Alexander Pohl)
- Audience Awards
  - Feature Narrative: Sea Legs (Craig Butta)
  - Documentary: Between the Folds (Vanessa Gould)
  - Short Narrative: Pinchas (Pini Tavger)
  - Experimental: Flying Lotus (Daniel Garcia)
  - Animation: Skhizein (Jeremy Clapin)
- Certificates of Outstanding Achievement
  - Screenplay: Vinko Moderndorfer (Landscape No. 2)
  - Producer: Jim Jermanok and Harry Gregson-Williams (Em)
  - Cinematography: Steve Asselin (Borderline)
  - Editing: John Weiner and Danny Kuchuck (Cryptic)
  - Original Score: Ben Lovett (The Last Lullaby)
  - Actor Female: Kate Lyn Sheil (Knife Point)
  - Actor Male: Joshua Peace (You Might as Well Live)

=== 2008 ===
- Main Competition
  - Grand Chameleon Award: Fix (Tao Ruspoli)
  - Best Narrative Feature: Fix (Tao Ruspoli)
  - Best Documentary (Diane Seligman Award): Carny (Alison Murray)
  - Best Short: On the Line (Reto Caffi)
  - Best Animation: 24 Frames (Brad Pattullo)
  - Best Experimental: Flying Lesson (R. Chamecki, P. Harder, A. Lerner)
  - Best New Director: The Unidentified (Kevan Tucker)
- Spirit Awards
  - Feature Narrative: Apollo 54 (Giordano Giulivi)
  - Documentary: ABC Columbia (Enrica Colusso)
  - Short Narrative: The Line (Kent Basset)
  - Experimental: Nightwalking (Ellen Blom)
  - Animation: Hezurbeltzak, A Common Grave (Izibene Onederra)
- Audience Awards
  - Feature Narrative: The Collective (Judson Pearce Morgan and Kelly Overton)
  - Documentary: Crawford (David Modigliani)
  - Short Narrative: Crosse (Liova Jedlicki)
  - Experimental: Machine with Wishbone (Randall Okita)
  - Animation: The Long Journey Home (Billie Mintz and Jeffrey Stewart Timmins)
- Certificates of Outstanding Achievement
  - Screenplay: Ilmar Raag (The Class)
  - Producer: P. Krik, K. Lang, A. Krepostman (Able Danger)
  - Cinematography: Filip Zumbrunn (Out of Bounds)
  - Editing: Giordano Giulivi (Apollo 54)
  - Original Score: Bart Westerlaken (Panman, Rhythm of the Palms)
  - Actor Female: Marie-Luise Schramm (Nothing Else Matters)
  - Actor Male: Shawn Andrews (Fix)

=== 2006 ===
- Best Short: Neutral Corner (Emily Greenwood) - a young boxer arriving in a desolate town where he meets a dog, a stranger and a mysterious waitress.

Every year, BFF creates a "Best of Fest" package to take to different venues as a festival showcase. In the past, these films have been shown in other parts of Brooklyn, in Manhattan, as well as at the Havana Film Festival and the Museo Arte Contemporanea in Rome.

== Festival team ==
Executive director Marco Ursino has been immersed in the entertainment industry in both the US and Italy for the past 33 years. Beginning in Italy in 1976, he has appeared as an actor in various video projects for Italian TV. He has written several screenplays, worked in production design, and produced independent documentaries and feature films, including his own, Clouds of Magellan, which he wrote and directed. He is a member of the Screen Actors Guild.

Director of programming Mario Pegoraro won Best Short film at the 1993 Venice Film Festival. He also produced the international "City of Water Project" in collaboration with architects from around the globe. He joined BFF following a successful career in film production, distribution and new media development in 1998.

Director of development Susan Mackell has 19 years of public relations experience working on the PR program for the American College for the Applied Arts in London and Atlanta, Georgia. She has also produced several film projects.
