= The Panman: Rhythm of the Palms =

- Directed by: Sander Burger
- Written by: Ian Valz
- Produced by: Ian Valz; Norman de Palm
- Starring: Ian Valz; Earl Duzong; Rita Gumbs; Cedric Ortega; Gee Money; Betty Nisbeth; Shama Furlton; Liesbeth Kamerling Ronacko Reece
- Narrated by: Earl Duzong
- Cinematography: Sal Kroonenberg
- Edited by: Chris van Oers
- Music by: Bart Westerlaken / plus two songs by the St Maarten born band Orange Grove (My Roots, Hurtin)
- Release date: 2007
- Running time: 90 minutes
- Countries: Sint Maarten; Netherlands
- Language: English

The Panman: Rhythm of the Palms is a 2007 film that tells the story of the rise and fall of the steel drum pan player Harry Daniel. Daniel is an icon of the Caribbean whose personal life suffers when he places his music above his family. For he is desperate to pass the pan culture to a younger generation. During this crusade to keep the music alive on his beloved island of St Martin, he meets the exceptionally talented Jacko, who becomes his star apprentice and hope for the future. Harry treats him like the son he never had. However, when Harry's fame begins to diminish, Jacko turns against him and embraces instead the world of rock music. But when Harry dies unexpectedly, Jacko returns to his island culture to become pan music's brilliant new icon.

Since its December 2007 red-carpet premiere in St. Maarten, Panman has been screened elsewhere in the region and is on the line-up for film festivals in the UK, North America, Europe, South Africa and Australia. It was also shown at the Curaçao film festival and at Carifesta in Guyana and had a grand premiere in the Netherlands September 2008.

The film has picked up two awards, winning the best feature film at the Hollywood Black Film Festival and Best Score at the Brooklyn International Film Festival, both in June 2008.

Panman is based on Ian Valz's play Rhythm of the Palms, first produced in 1991. The film is the debut feature of Dutch director Sandy Burger and is co-produced by scriptwriter Norman de Palm.

The Panman: Rhythm of the Palms is St. Maarten's first locally produced feature film; most of Panman’s cast are home-grown actors, most of them introduced to the stage and groomed by Valz himself.

On April 28, 2010, Valz died of cancer at St. Maarten Medical Center.

== Awards ==
- 2008 Brooklyn International Film Festival (Brooklyn, NY) — Winner, Best Original Score Award (Jury).
- 2008 Hollywood Black Film Festival (Hollywood, CA) — Winner, Best Feature Film Award (Jury).
