= Ian Valz =

- Born: Ian Michael Valz; August 28, 1957; Georgetown, Guyana
- Died: April 28, 2010 (aged 52); St. Maarten
- Occupations: Actor, Director, Playwright
- Presenting career
- Country: Guyana; Sint Maarten

Ian Michael Valz (August 28, 1957 in Georgetown – April 28, 2010 in St. Maarten) was a Guyanese playwright, award-winning filmmaker, and actor. On April 28, 2010, he died of cancer at St. Maarten Medical Center.

== Life and career ==
Valz was born on Hadfield Street, Georgetown where he attended St. Mary's Primary and St. Stanislaus College. He was an integral part of the development of Guyanese theater in the eighties and was well known for his many contributions to dramatic production. From his early radio serial drama, House of Pressure to popular stage shows such as Two's a Crowd and Masquerade. Published in St. Maarten, Masquerade (House of Nehesi Publishers, 1988) was nominated for the Guyana Prize for Literature in 1992.

He also penned plays such as House of Pressure (also a radio serial) 1981; Room to Let, A Passage to the Sun, Virgin In Black, Rhythm of the Palms which became the movie, The Panman: Rhythm of the Palms, The Peacock Dance which was made into a television movie in 2004, Separate Status, Breaking All The Rules, Antillean House, Breakfast@Oranje, Borderline, Chiware's Revenge and The Plantation.

Valz was appointed a 5th grade(Ridder) of the Order of Orange-Nassau by her majesty, Queen Beatrix of the Netherlands in 2006. A graduate of St Stanislaus College, Georgetown, Guyana, he also did theater studies at the Theater Guild. He held a Public Health Diploma, from the University Of Guyana. In Guyana he served as Sports and Cultural Director, from 1982 to 1984. He began residing in St. Maarten from 1984 where he became the Drama Director of the Cultural Center of St. Maarten from 1985 to 1995. His next post was artistic director of the St. Maarten Independent Theater Foundation, from 1994 until his death.

Valz wrote and staged 13 of his 15 known plays in St. Maarten but it was the television movie version of his 1999 The Peacock Dance and the 2004 film The Panman: Rhythm of the Palms which secured Valz's position as one of the region's leading playwrights. All told, he directed over 60 plays and acted in more than 30.

In 2008, The Panman took top honours in the narrative feature film category of the 2008 Hollywood Black Film Festival.

Two’s A Crowd Too, continuation of Valz's play Two's a Crowd was produced by Godfrey Naughton and performed at the National Cultural Centre in 2010.

According to Valz's publisher, "The most extensive biographical profile about his work to date is found in the book St. Martin Massive! A Snapshot of Popular Artists (House of Nehesi Publishers, 2000).

== Plays ==
- Two’s a Crowd (1982)
- Room to Let (1982)
- Masquerade (1985)
- A Passage to the Sun (1988)
- Virgin In Black (1989)
- Rhythm of the Palms (1990)
- Separate Status (1997)
- The Peacock Dance (2001)
- The Peacock Dance 2 (2002)
- Breaking All the Rules (2003)
- Antillean House (2004)
- Breakfast@Oranje (2006)
- Borderline (2007)
- Chiware’s Revenge (2007)
- The Plantation (2008)

== Television ==
- The Peacock Dance (2003)
- The Plantation (Post Production 2010)

== Film ==
- The Panman: Rhythm of the Palms (2007)
