= Allen Wolf =

American film director (born 1970)

- Born: Allen Wolf; October 29, 1970 (age 55); US
- Education: New York University
- Years active: 1990 – Present

Allen Wolf (born October 29, 1970) is an American film director, screenwriter, film producer, novelist, and board game creator.

== Filmmaking ==
Allen Wolf studied filmmaking at New York University, where he graduated summa cum laude. He wrote, directed and produced his senior thesis film, Harlem Grace, which was a finalist for the Student Academy Awards and the Producers Guild of America Awards. His debut feature film is In My Sleep.

In 2005, he produced a short, The Sound of Movies, which was a finalist for the Coca-Cola Refreshing Filmmaker's Award.

In 2010, Wolf's feature directorial debut, In My Sleep, screened at the market at the Cannes Film Festival, where The Hollywood Reporter called it "A sexy, well-made thriller. Savvy entertainment…will appeal to twentysomething audiences and movie-buff viewers who appreciate the pursued-pursuer, Hitchcockian style of suspenser. Narratively, In My Sleep never rests, a credit to the tight, psychologically astute pacing of filmmaker Wolf and editor Peter Devaney Flanagan. In like dark vein, cinematographer Michael Hardwick's taut compositions and vivid scopings magnify this nocturnal horror story."

On November 6, 2010, In My Sleep screened at the Fort Lauderdale Film Festival, where it won the Audience Choice Award. Since it first screened at Cannes, the movie has sold to over seventy countries around the world. In My Sleep was released theatrically in more than twenty-five cities in the U.S. and debuted as the number-one new independent movie its opening weekend. The In My Sleep (Special Edition Blu-ray/DVD Combo) was released on November 8, 2011. Allen was interviewed about his hit film In My Sleep January 15, 2012, on the show NewsTek.

In 2014, Wolf was a story consultant for the Hulu series Complete Works.

In 2015, In My Sleep debuted on the Lifetime Movie Network.

In 2021, Wolf wrote, directed, and produced the feature film The Sound of Violet based on his novel. The screenplay for The Sound of Violet won ten awards. It was a Second Rounder for the Austin Film Festival and won the Silver Award at the Cinequest Film Festival. The film received a limited theatrical release on April 29, 2022 and earned $32,333 at the box office. It was the number 1 new independent film on its opening weekend.

== Writing ==
In 2015, Wolf's debut novel The Sound of Violet was published, and was based on his award-winning screenplay. The Sound of Violet is a romantic dramedy about a man who believes he found his perfect soulmate but his autism prevents him from realizing she's actually a prostitute. The romantic comedy novel highlights autism and human trafficking. Wolf's novel garnered praise from a number of critics and won the Gold Medal from the Literary Classic Awards, the IndieFab Book of the Year Award, the Gold Medal from Readers' Favorite Book Awards, the Silver Medal from the Benjamin Franklin Awards, and was a finalist for the USA Book Awards.

Kirkus Reviews wrote: "Its cinematic potential clearly shows. The high-concept narrative is entertaining, well-paced, and highly visual … it’s a charming, humorous, and hopeful tale. A quirky, touching love story that offers insights into autism, religion, and personal tragedy."

Blue Ink Review wrote: "By turning conventions of contemporary romance on its stilettos and swapping out the typical sassy, fashion-obsessed female protagonist for an autistic male who reads jokes from index cards, Wolf puts a fresh spin on the genre. Adapted from his award-winning screenplay, The Sound of Violet shows signs of its origins with snappy dialogue and humorous, well-staged scenes … A sweet and entertaining romantic comedy, The Sound of Violet touches on autism and the power of faith. It will appeal to any reader who enjoys a blend of quirky characters, humor and drama."

Forward Reviews wrote: "This warm, witty story does not shy away from serious themes like exploitation, redemption, and true love. The Sound of Violet explores heavy issues with a light touch. It’s easy to see this being adapted into an enjoyable movie."

== Board Games ==
Wolf has also created a line of best-selling board games under the name of Morning Star Games. He has received 38 different awards for his games, ranging from groups such as iParenting to the National Association of Gifted Children. The games he created are Pet Detectives, You're Pulling My Leg, You're Pulling My Leg! Junior, Slap Wacky, and JabberJot.
