= Laura Allen =

American actress (born 1974)

- Born: March 21, 1974 (age 52); Portland, Oregon, U.S.
- Education: Wellesley College
- Occupation: Actress
- Years active: 2000–present

Laura Allen (born March 21, 1974) is an American actress. She is known for her roles on the ABC Daytime soap opera All My Children (2000–2002) and the USA Network television series The 4400 (2004–2005, 2007). She has also been a regular cast member on Dirt (2007 to 2008), Terriers (2010), and Awake (2012).

== Early life ==
Allen was born in Portland, Oregon, and grew up on Bainbridge Island, Washington. She is the middle child of three sisters. She attended Wellesley College as a sociology major and graduated in 1996. She worked with the NYPD as a domestic violence counselor before pursuing acting.

== Career ==
=== 1997–2002: Early work and All My Children ===
While pursuing her career in social work, Allen became drawn to the theatre. She took a job as a crew member for the Blue Man Group, then won a role as Maid Marion in a touring production of Robin Hood. Despite the grueling experience of the Robin Hood tour, Allen decided she wanted to focus on acting.

Allen began working as a waitress while interning at the MCC Theater, where she met Robert LuPone. He mentored her, teaching her the Meisner technique and introducing her to her first agent. Allen turned down a role on Sex and the City when she learned that it would require nudity. She won a guest starring role on The Street.

She auditioned unsuccessfully for the roles of Michelle Bauer on Guiding Light and Melanie MacIver on One Life to Live before being cast as Laura Kirk-English on All My Children. The role had previously been played by Lauren Roman. Allen played Laura from October 2000 to January 2002.

=== 2003–2008: The 4400 and Dirt ===
After departing AMC, Allen went on to play Susan Delacorte in Mike Newell's Mona Lisa Smile. On television, she guest starred on Cold Case, North Shore, House, and Criminal Minds. In 2004, Allen was cast as Samantha Wade in Sucker Free City, a Showtime film directed by Spike Lee. This was followed by a leading role as Jane Carol Webb in the film How You Look to Me.

She landed a starring role on USA Network's hit series, The 4400, playing the role of Lily Tyler. However, her character was written out of the show before its third season. She reprised the role of Lily Tyler in 2007 in the fourth season of The 4400 for one episode.

In 2007, Allen was cast in a regular role on the FX drama series Dirt, playing Julia Mallory. She guest starred on Law & Order: Special Victims Unit and appeared in the films From Within and The Collective.

=== 2009–2012: Terriers and Awake ===
Allen played a recurring role on Grey's Anatomy in 2009 as the ex-lover of Owen (Kevin McKidd). She guest starred on CSI: Miami and appeared in the films Hysteria and Old Dogs.

She played Linda in the 2010 comedy film Cherry, co-starring with Kyle Gallner. Allen then had a regular role as Katie Nichols on the short-lived FX series Terriers in 2010. In 2012, she was initially cast in a supporting role on the NBC series Awake (then titled REM), but was promoted to a leading role as Hannah Britten.

Allen was cast in a Lifetime pilot, The Secret Lives of Husbands and Wives, in 2012. In early 2013, it was announced that the project wasn't going forward.

=== 2014–present ===
In 2014, Allen had a recurring role as Rochelle Matheson on Ravenswood, a spinoff of Pretty Little Liars. She portrayed Meg in the horror film Clown. Allen starred as Linda Kessler in the Lifetime movie Nanny Cam. She also had a guest starring role on NCIS: New Orleans.

Allen was cast as Olivia in Marvel's Most Wanted, a proposed spinoff of Agents of S.H.I.E.L.D. in 2016. The project was dropped before it could air. In May 2016, Allen guest starred on Criminal Minds: Beyond Borders. She had a recurring role as Rosie on American Horror Story: Cult in 2017.

In the 2018 film The Tale, a drama about sexual abuse, Allen played a younger version of Ellen Burstyn's character. She continued to take on dramatic roles, appearing in the short film Unspeakable, directed by Milena Govich. On television, she had a regular role as Officer Reynolds in the third season of Hap and Leonard.

Allen had recurring roles on 9-1-1 and Suits in 2019. In 2024, she began appearing in the recurring role of Chief Robinson on Chicago Fire.

== Personal life ==
After leaving All My Children in 2002, Allen took a ten week training course to become an emergency medical technician.

== Filmography ==
=== Film ===
Year	Title	Role	Notes
2003	A Tale of Two	Limo Girl	Short film
2003	Mona Lisa Smile	Susan Delacorte	
2005	How You Look to Me	Jane Carol Webb	
2008	From Within	Trish	
2008	The Collective	Clare	
2009	Old Dogs	Kelly	
2010	Cherry	Linda	
2010	Hysteria	Erin	
2013	Red Car	Marilyn	Short film
2014	Clown	Meg McCoy	
2017	Tulip Fever	Buxom Wench	
2018	The Tale	Young Nettie	
2018	Unspeakable	Marie Deguire	Short film
2019	One Foot in Front	The Mom	Short film
2020	Last Looks	Friend	Short film

=== Television ===
Year	Title	Role	Notes
2000	The Street	Jennifer	Episode: "Pilot"
2000–2002	All My Children	Laura Kirk-English	Contract role
2004	Cold Case	Vanessa Prosser	Episode: "Late Returns"
2004	North Shore	Monique	Episode: "More"
2004	Sucker Free City	Samantha Wade	Television film
2004–2005; 2007	The 4400	Lily Tyler	Main cast (seasons 1–2)
2006	House	Sarah Alston	Episode: "All In"
2007	Criminal Minds	Bobbi Baird	Episode: "Open Season"
2007	Law & Order: Special Victims Unit	Cass Magnall	Episode: "Alternate"
2007–2008	Dirt	Julia Mallory	Main cast
2009	Grey's Anatomy	Beth Whitman	Episodes: "Beat Your Heart Out", "Before and After"
2009	CSI: Miami	Sondra Moore	Episode: "Dissolved"
2010	Terriers	Katie Nichols	Main cast
2012	Awake	Hannah Britten	Main cast
2013	Secret Lives of Husbands and Wives	Alison Dunn	Unaired pilot
2013–2014	Ravenswood	Rochelle Matheson	6 episodes
2014	NCIS: New Orleans	Katherine Wilson	Episode: "Watch Over Me"
2014	Nanny Cam	Linda Kessler	Television film
2015; 2019	Suits	Lily Specter	Episodes: "Hitting Home", "Faith", "Thunder Away"
2016	Marvel's Most Wanted	Olivia	Unaired pilot
2016	Criminal Minds: Beyond Borders	Emily Wagner	Episode: "Paper Orphans"
2017	American Horror Story: Cult	Rosie	Episodes: "Neighbors from Hell", "Holes"
2017	Wisdom of the Crowd	Shelly Walsh	Episode: "Clear History"
2018	9-1-1	Marcy Nash	Episodes: "Point of Origin", "Bobby Begins Again"
2018	Hap and Leonard	Officer Reynolds	5 episodes
2019–2021	Truth Be Told	Alana Cave	5 episodes
2024	Chicago Fire	Chief Danya Robinson	7 episodes
2025	FBI: International	Marlena Kline	Episode: "A Winged Lion for Protection"
