= Across Two Oceans =

Studio album by Tim Janis
- Released: July 27, 2004
- Genre: Neo-classical
- Length: 40:58
- Label: Tim Janis Ensemble
- Producer: ?

Tim Janis chronology
Beautiful America (2003)	Across Two Oceans (2004)	The Promise (2005)

Across Two Oceans is a neo-classical music album by Tim Janis, released in 2004. The album peaked at #7 on the Top New Age Albums chart.

== Track listing ==
1. "The Sea on Every Side" – 3:10
2. "Where the Earth Touches the Sky" – 3:01
3. "With Gathering Wonder" – 2:36
4. "For Only a Moment (Piano Reprise)" – 2:44
5. "To a Waiting Heart" – 3:37
6. "Echo Lake (Piano Reprise)" – 4:06
7. "Endless and Ever Beautiful" – 2:36
8. "Somewhere and Beyond" – 2:50
9. "Harvest Moon (Piano Reprise)" – 2:24
10. "Across Two Oceans" – 2:23
11. "Beneath the Distance" – 2:37
12. "Ocean of Diamonds" – 3:16
13. "Summer Wind" – 2:34
14. "Spring Point Light" – 3:04

== Personnel ==
- Cinnamon Creeden – flute, penny whistle
- Keith Foley – fretless bass
- Andy Happel – acoustic guitar
- Peter Janis – executive producer
- Tim Janis – synthesizer, piano
- Shan Jiang – violin
- Scott Kennedy – percussion
- Sergei Kogut – violin
- Janice Martin – violin
- Paul Stubblebine – mastering
