= The Collective (2008 film) =

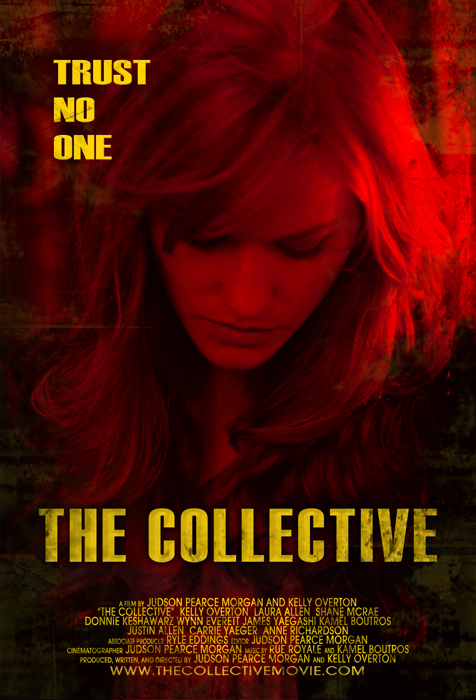
- The Collective poster
- Directed by: Judson Pearce Morgan; Kelly Overton
- Written by: Judson Pearce Morgan; Kelly Overton
- Produced by: Judson Pearce Morgan; Kelly Overton
- Starring: Kelly Overton; Laura Allen; Donnie Keshawarz; Shane McRae; Wynn Everett
- Cinematography: Judson Pearce Morgan
- Edited by: Judson Pearce Morgan
- Music by: Kamel Boutros
- Distributed by: Fabrication Films
- Release date: June 2008 (BiFF)
- Running time: 85 minutes
- Country: United States
- Language: English

The Collective is a 2008 American independent horror film written, directed, and produced by Judson Pearce Morgan and Kelly Overton. The film was released to film festivals in 2008 and slated for theatrical release in 2009.

== Premise ==
Tyler Clarke receives a cryptic voice-mail from her sister Jessica pleading for help but giving no explanation of the trouble she is in. Tyler makes several attempts to call her sister but to no avail. In a moment of desperation, she takes the red-eye to New York to find Jessica. Upon her arrival in the city, she realises that her sister is nowhere to be found and has seemingly disappeared without a trace. In order to find out what has happened, Tyler must delve into a world of darkness and lies, which ultimately leads her to the underbelly of a spiritually depraved community living in a deconsecrated cathedral calling themselves "The Collective". Tyler is both shocked and horrified to discover that her sister is now one of them.

== Cast ==
- Kelly Overton as Tyler Clarke
- Laura Allen as Clare
- Donnie Keshawarz as Rost
- Shane McRae as Conor
- Wynn Everett as Jessica
- David Plant as Brian
- Anne Richardson as Dawn
- Justin Allen as Nate
- Kamel Boutros as Spencer
- Anne Bates as Eden
- Carrie Yaeger as Becca
- James Yaegashi as The Janitor

== Reception ==
Justin Tanzer of Off Off Off gave a mixed review of the film, writing that the film "lacks believability and high stakes. It is short on thought. It takes place in isolation, lacking meaningful interaction between the characters and anybody outside conspiracy-land", but granting the "movie's most redeeming feature is that it's well crafted from a technical point of view. Director/cinematographer Morgan, who has been primarily an actor up to now, has done a fantastic job behind the camera. The light and colors are simply beautiful. It would be a pleasure to see more of his work". In her review of the film, Robyn Hillman-Herrigan of Brooklyn Daily Eagle reported that the film was winner of the Audience Choice Award at the 2008 Brooklyn International Film Festival and that the husband-wife team of Kelly Overton and Judson Pearce wanted to make a "‘Bourne Identity’- type suspense thriller on a low budget." When commenting about The Collective screening at the festival, Tom Boyd of Real Vail wrote of Kelly Overton, "[she] is just the kind of star Vail attracts: she's young, up-and-coming, and about to debut in the leading role in her first feature film".

== Awards and nominations ==
The Collective has been screening at multiple film festivals through 2008 and 2009, and has received recognition at many, including:

- 2008 Brooklyn International Film Festival, Audience Award
- 2008 HDFest, First runner-up Best HD Editing in a Feature, Honorable Mention Best Cinematography in a Feature
- 2008 Zero Film Festival, Purple Heart
- 2008 Trimedia Film festival, Audience Award, Best Feature Film
- 2009 Honolulu International Film Festival, Gold Kahuna Award

== Soundtrack ==
The Collective featured the song "Parachutes and Lifeboats" by the band Rue Royale.
