= Abigail Spencer =

American actress (born 1981)

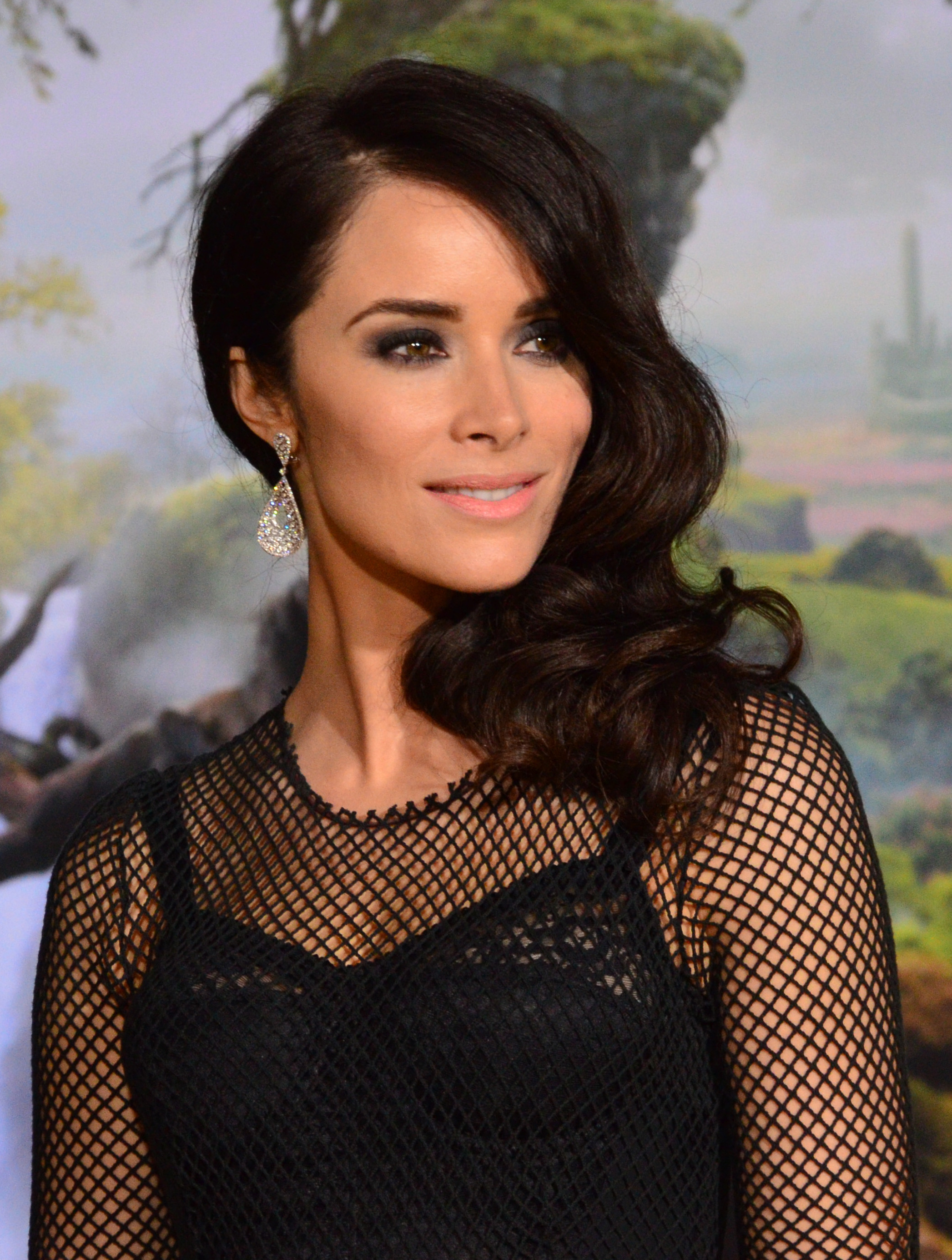
- Spencer in 2013
- Born: Abigail Leigh Spencer; August 4, 1981 (age 45); Gulf Breeze, Florida, U.S.
- Occupation: Actress
- Years active: 1997–present
- Spouse: Andrew Pruett (m. 2004; div. 2013)
- Children: 1
- Parent: Yancy Spencer III (father)

Abigail Leigh Spencer (born August 4, 1981) is an American actress, producer, and writer. She began her career playing Rebecca Tyree on the ABC daytime television soap opera All My Children (1999–2001) before going on to star in the Lifetime crime drama series Angela's Eyes (2006). From 2013 to 2016, Spencer starred as Amantha Holden in the SundanceTV drama series Rectify, for which she received a nomination for a Critics' Choice Television Award; she then starred as history professor Lucy Preston in the NBC science-fiction series Timeless. As of 2026, she is in a lead role on the FOX series Best Medicine.

Spencer has appeared in many films, including In My Sleep (2010), Cowboys & Aliens (2011), This Means War (2012), Chasing Mavericks (2012), The Haunting in Connecticut 2: Ghosts of Georgia (2013), Oz the Great and Powerful (2013), and This Is Where I Leave You (2014). She also had recurring roles on the series Mad Men (2009), Hawthorne (2009–2011), Suits (2011–2019), and Grey's Anatomy (2017–2022).

== Early life ==
Spencer was born and raised in Gulf Breeze, Florida, the daughter of Lydia Ann Brown and surfer Yancy Spencer III. She has two brothers. Spencer has said that she is part Cherokee.

== Career ==
Spencer's first major acting role was playing Rebecca "Becca" Tyree on ABC soap opera All My Children from June 3, 1999, to April 10, 2001. She later starred in Lifetime Television original series Angela's Eyes, which was cancelled on December 1, 2006. In the following years, she began playing guest roles on several television series, including CSI: Crime Scene Investigation, How I Met Your Mother, Private Practice and Castle.

Spencer played the role of a blogging enthusiast in Twix advertisements, and portrayed Miss Farrell, a love interest of Don Draper, on AMC's Mad Men in 2009. In early 2011, she landed the lead role on ABC drama pilot Grace by Krista Vernoff. Spencer had previously played the title character in another Krista Vernoff drama pilot, Introducing Lennie Rose, in 2005. Spencer appeared in a recurring role as Dr. Erin Jameson on the TNT series Hawthorne in 2010, and from 2011 to 2019 had a recurring role as Dana "Scottie" Scott, Gabriel Macht's character's old rival, on the USA Network legal drama Suits.

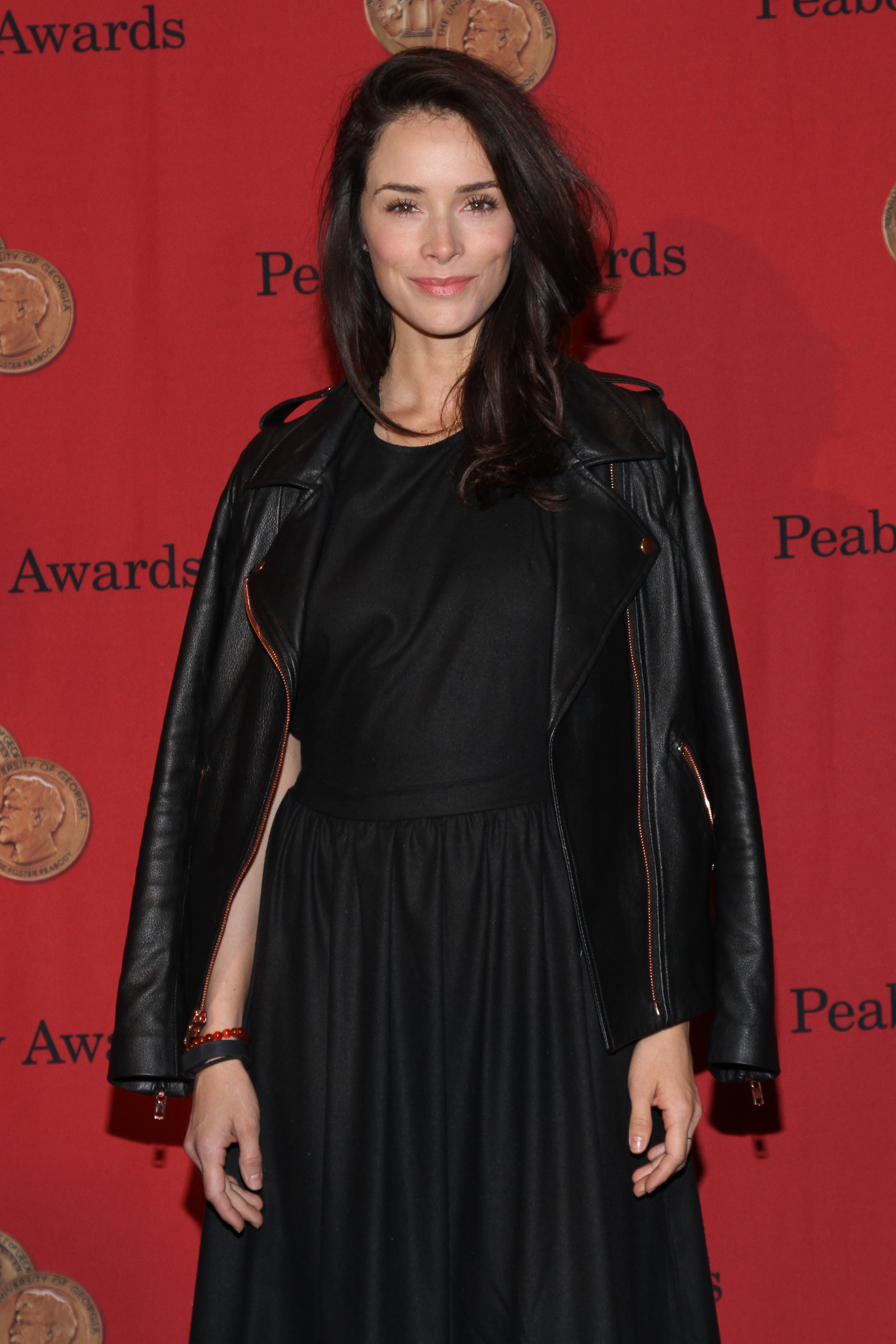
Spencer at the 73rd Annual Peabody Awards in 2014

Spencer has appeared in several films, including In My Sleep (2010), Cowboys & Aliens (2011), This Means War (2012), and Chasing Mavericks (2012), and she played the lead role in The Haunting in Connecticut 2: Ghosts of Georgia (2013). She appeared in fantasy adventure film Oz the Great and Powerful, directed by Sam Raimi, in 2013.

Spencer received critical acclaim for starring as Amantha Holden in the Sundance Channel original drama series Rectify (2013–2017). She was nominated for Critics' Choice Television Award for Best Supporting Actress in a Drama Series and Satellite Award for Best Actress – Television Series Drama for her performance in the series.

Spencer played the lead role in the indie drama A Beautiful Now, written by Daniela Amavia, about a passionate dancer who finds herself considering an extreme act when she reaches a crossroads in her life. She was nominated for a Madrid International Film Festival Award for Best Actress for her performance in film. In 2014, Spencer appeared opposite Jason Bateman in the comedy-drama film This Is Where I Leave You, an ensemble comedy directed by Shawn Levy, and starred with John Travolta and Christopher Plummer in the crime thriller film The Forger.

In October 2014, Spencer joined the cast of the second season of HBO crime drama series, True Detective.

In 2016, Spencer was cast as lead character Lucy Preston in the NBC series Timeless, where she plays a history professor sent on time travel missions to different eras in an effort to prevent others from disrupting the U.S.-related timestream. A review of the series in Variety called Spencer "prodigiously talented" and that she played "a character whose major personality traits are 'smart' and 'plucky.'" A review by Deadline Hollywood said that the show was a waste of Spencer's talents. The New York Times wrote that "Abigail Spencer is good as Lucy, the spunky historian who is the show's central character." Timeless was renewed by NBC on May 12, 2017. The network had canceled the series days earlier, but reversed the decision. The series ended after two seasons.

Spencer and Duke Johnson's production company, Innerlight Films, has produced award-winning short films such as Here and Now, and the 2015 Oscar short-listed Winter Light. The company has also produced the film The Actor, based on Donald E. Westlake's novel Memory, starring André Holland and Gemma Chan.

== Personal life ==
Spencer married Andrew Pruett in 2004 and gave birth to their son in 2008. They filed for divorce in February 2012, divorcing in 2013. In 2018, Spencer was a guest at the wedding of Prince Harry and Meghan Markle at Windsor Castle.

== Filmography ==
=== Film ===
| Year | Title | Role | Notes |
|---|---|---|---|
| 2001 | Campfire Stories | Melissa | |
| 2003 | Graduation Night | Skye | |
| 2005 | A Coat of Snow | Sandy | |
| 2006 | Hooked | Wendy | Short film |
| 2007 | Passing the Time | Jessica | Short film |
| 2007 | Jekyll | Talia Carew | |
| 2010 | In My Sleep | Gwen | |
| 2011 | Cowboys & Aliens | Alice | |
| 2012 | This Means War | Katie | |
| 2012 | Chasing Mavericks | Brenda Hesson | |
| 2013 | The Haunting in Connecticut 2: Ghosts of Georgia | Lisa Wyrick | |
| 2013 | Oz the Great and Powerful | May | |
| 2013 | Kilimanjaro | Yvonne | |
| 2013 | Here and Now | Woman | Short film; also writer and executive producer |
| 2014 | The Pieces | Vanessa | Short film |
| 2014 | This Is Where I Leave You | Quinn Altman | |
| 2014 | The Forger | Agent Paisley | |
| 2015 | The Heyday of the Insensitive Bastards | Abigail | |
| 2015 | A Walk in Winter | Abigail | Short film |
| 2015 | A Beautiful Now | Romy | |
| 2015 | H8RZ | Laura Sedgewick | |
| 2015 | Stars | Heather | Short film |
| 2016 | The Sweet Life | Lolita Nowicki | |
| 2017 | Three Women | Madeline | Short film |
| 2018 | Buttons: A Christmas Tale | Annabelle Hill | |
| 2021 | The Black Hole | Feather (voice) | Short film |
| 2025 | The Actor | —N/a | Producer |
| 2026 | Clean Hands | Dana | |

=== Television ===
| Year | Title | Role | Notes |
|---|---|---|---|
| 1999–2001 | All My Children | Rebecca "Becca" Tyree | 21 episodes |
| 2005 | Fathers and Sons | Clarissa | Television film |
| 2005 | CSI: Crime Scene Investigation | Becky Lester | Episode: "Bite Me" |
| 2006 | Killer Instinct | Violet Summers | Episode "Love Hurts" |
| 2006 | Gilmore Girls | Megan | Episode: "Bridesmaids Revisited" |
| 2006 | Angela's Eyes | Angela Henson | 13 episodes, lead role |
| 2006 | Introducing Lennie Rose | Lennie Rose | Television pilot |
| 2007 | Ghost Whisperer | Cindy Brown | Episode: "Speed Demon" |
| 2007 | My Boys | Lyssa | Episode: "Douchebag in the City" |
| 2007, 2014 | How I Met Your Mother | Blah blah (Carol) | 2 episodes |
| 2008 | Welcome to the Captain | Claire Tanner | Episode: "The Letter" |
| 2008 | Bones | Philipa Fitz | Episode: "The Man in the Mud" |
| 2008 | Moonlight | Simone Walker | Episode: "Sonata" |
| 2009 | Private Practice | Rachel | Episode: "Ex-Life" |
| 2009 | Mad Men | Suzanne Farrell | 6 episodes |
| 2009 | Castle | Sarah Reed | Episode: "One Man's Treasure" |
| 2010 | Hawthorne | Dr. Erin Jameson | 8 episodes |
| 2010 | The Glades | Ashley Carter | Episode: "The Girlfriend Experience" |
| 2010–2012 | Childrens Hospital | Young Chief / Chief in Her 20s / Maxine Spratt | 3 episodes |
| 2010 | Rex Is Not Your Lawyer | Lindsey Steers | Television pilot |
| 2011 | Grace | Sarah Grace | Television pilot |
| 2011–2019 | Suits | Dana "Scottie" Scott | 12 episodes |
| 2011 | How to be a Gentleman | Lydia | Episode: "Pilot" |
| 2012–2013 | Burning Love | Annie | 25 episodes |
| 2013–2016 | Rectify | Amantha Holden | 30 episodes, main cast |
| 2013 | NTSF:SD:SUV | Caroline | Episode: "Comic Con-Air" |
| 2015 | True Detective | Gena Brune | 6 episodes |
| 2016 | Comedy Bang! Bang! | Vanna | Episode: "Zach Galifianakis Wears Rolled Khakis and Shoes with Brown Laces" |
| 2016–2018 | Timeless | Lucy Preston | 27 episodes, main cast |
| 2017–2022 | Grey's Anatomy | Dr. Megan Hunt | 15 episodes |
| 2019 | Wayne | Donna Luccetti | Episode: "Chapter Five: Del" |
| 2019 | Reprisal | Doris Quinn / Katherine Harlow | 10 episodes |
| 2021 | Rebel | Dr. Misha Nelson | 9 episodes |
| 2023–2024 | Extended Family | Julia Mariano | 13 episodes |
| 2024 | Shatter Belt | | Executive producer, 2 episodes |
| 2025 | Law & Order | Michelle Burns | Episode: "Duty to Protect" |
| 2025 | 9-1-1 | Amber Braeburn | 2 episodes |
| 2026 | Best Medicine | Louisa Gavin | Main cast |

== Accolades ==
| Year | Association | Category | Work | Result |
|---|---|---|---|---|
| 2000 | Soap Opera Digest Awards | Outstanding Female Newcomer | All My Children | Won |
| 2013 | Critics' Choice Awards | Best Supporting Actress in a Drama Series | Rectify | Nominated |
| 2014 | Satellite Awards | Best Actress in a Series, Drama | Rectify | Nominated |
| 2017 | Teen Choice Awards | Choice Sci-Fi/Fantasy TV Actress | Timeless | Nominated |
