= The Haunting in Connecticut 2: Ghosts of Georgia =

- Theatrical release poster
- Directed by: Tom Elkins
- Written by: David Coggeshall
- Produced by: Paul Brooks; Scott Niemeyer
- Starring: Abigail Spencer; Chad Michael Murray; Katee Sackhoff; Emily Alyn Lind; Cicely Tyson
- Cinematography: Yaron Levy
- Edited by: Tom Elkins; Elliot Greenberg
- Music by: Michael Wandmacher
- Production company: Gold Circle Films
- Distributed by: Lionsgate
- Release date: February 1, 2013
- Running time: 100 minutes
- Country: United States
- Language: English
- Budget: $8 million
- Box office: $5.1 million

The Haunting in Connecticut 2: Ghosts of Georgia is a 2013 American psychological horror film and a spiritual successor to the 2009 film The Haunting in Connecticut. Directed by Tom Elkins and written by David Coggeshall, the film stars Abigail Spencer, Chad Michael Murray and Emily Alyn Lind, with Katee Sackhoff and Cicely Tyson in supporting roles. It follows a family that moves into a historic home in rural Georgia, only to discover dark supernatural forces tied to the home's history as a stop on the Underground Railroad. The story is inspired by the alleged real-life events surrounding the Wyrick house in Ellerslie, Georgia, as recounted in the book The Veil: Heidi Wyrick's Story.

The Haunting in Connecticut 2: Ghosts of Georgia was given a limited release in the United States on February 1, 2013, followed by international releases throughout the year. The film received a wide release in the United Kingdom on October 31, 2013. It received negative reviews from critics, and grossed over $5 million worldwide against a budget of $1.5 million.

== Plot ==
The Wyrick family—Andy, Lisa, and their daughter Heidi—move into an old, historic house in the rural area of Ellerslie, Georgia. The family is excited about their new home, but soon after settling in, strange occurrences begin to take place. Heidi starts seeing a mysterious man named Mr. Gordy, who appears friendly at first but soon becomes more unsettling. Meanwhile, Lisa, who has been suppressing her own psychic abilities with medication, begins to experience visions she had long tried to avoid.

Lisa’s sister, Joyce, moves in with the family and encourages Lisa to embrace her psychic gifts. As the paranormal events escalate, Heidi continues to encounter more spirits, and Lisa starts to realize that their new home holds dark secrets from its past. They learn that the house was once part of the Underground Railroad, used to shelter runaway slaves seeking freedom. However, the house is also haunted by the malevolent spirit of a former stationmaster, known only as the Stationmaster, who terrorizes the family.

As Lisa and Joyce dig deeper into the history of the house, they uncover the grim truth about the spirits haunting their home. Mr. Gordy, who initially seemed to be helping Heidi, is actually trying to protect her from the vengeful Stationmaster, who had murdered enslaved individuals who sought refuge in the house.

Tensions rise as Heidi’s life is put in danger. Lisa, with Joyce’s help, must confront the malevolent forces and tap into her own psychic abilities to protect her family. They discover that the Stationmaster’s spirit is tied to a dark chapter of the house’s history, and the only way to end the haunting is to confront the source of his rage.

Lisa faces off against the Stationmaster in a battle to save her daughter. With her psychic abilities fully unleashed, Lisa manages to banish the vengeful spirit, bringing peace to the house and freeing the souls trapped by the Stationmaster’s malevolence. The Wyrick family’s ordeal ends, though they are left with the knowledge that Heidi’s psychic abilities, like Lisa’s, will continue to connect her to the spirit world.

With the house finally at peace, the family decides to stay, accepting the haunting as part of their lives. However, it is clear that the Wyricks will continue to be linked to the paranormal world, especially through Heidi’s ongoing connection to the spirits around her.

== Cast ==
- Abigail Spencer as Lisa Wyrick
- Chad Michael Murray as Andy Wyrick
- Emily Alyn Lind as Heidi Wyrick
- Katee Sackhoff as Joyce
- Cicely Tyson as Mama Kay
- Grant James as Mr. Gordy
- Lance E. Nichols as Pastor Wells
- Wayne Péré as Station Master
- Brad James as Prentiss
- Jaren Mitchell as Levi
- Lauren Pennington as Nell
- Hunter Burke as Arthur the Conductor
- Morgana Shaw as Lisa's Mother
- Andrea Frankle as Dr. Segar

== Release ==
The Haunting in Connecticut 2: Ghosts of Georgia was given a limited release in the United States on February 1, 2013, followed by international releases throughout the same year. The film received a wide release in the United Kingdom on October 31, 2013, coinciding with Halloween.

== Reception ==
On Rotten Tomatoes, the film holds a 19% approval rating based on 16 reviews. Similarly, Metacritic gave the film a score of 25 out of 100, indicating "generally unfavorable reviews," based on five reviews.

== Bibliography ==
- Cathery, Joyce (2007). The Veil: Heidi Wyrick's Story. ISBN 9780595421152.
