= In My Sleep =

- In My Sleep Poster
- Directed by: Allen Wolf
- Written by: Allen Wolf
- Produced by: Allen Wolf; David Austin; Daniel Sollinger
- Starring: Philip Winchester; Tim Draxl; Lacey Chabert; Abigail Spencer; Beth Grant; Kelly Overton; Michael Badalucco; Tony Hale
- Cinematography: Michael Hardwick
- Edited by: Peter Devaney Flanagan
- Music by: Conrad Pope
- Distributed by: Morning Star Pictures
- Release date: April 23, 2010
- Running time: 100 minutes
- Country: United States
- Language: English

In My Sleep is a 2010 suspense thriller film written, directed and produced by film director Allen Wolf. It stars Philip Winchester, Lacey Chabert, Tim Draxl, Abigail Spencer and Kelly Overton. It also features Kirsten Vangsness from Criminal Minds and Tony Hale from Veep in cameo roles. The film focuses on a massage therapist with chronic insomnia who fears he may have murdered a friend while sleepwalking.

== Synopsis ==
"Marcus wakes up in a cemetery with no memory of how he got there. He suffers from parasomnia, a sleep disorder which causes him to do things while asleep which he cannot remember, and so is plagued with questions: "Where was I last night? Who was I with?" Hoping to deal with his use of one-night stands to escape his problems, Marcus joins a Sexaholics Anonymous support group, where SA sponsor Derek helps him work through his problems. His disorder takes a turn for the worse when he wakes up and finds himself covered in blood with a knife at his side and the police banging at his door. In a panic he hides the evidence and then learns from the police that Ann, wife of his best friend Justin, was found stabbed to death. Marcus is terrified to put together the pieces of how she might have been murdered. A series of mysterious phone calls make him believe that someone is watching him. Desperate to figure out what happens after he goes to sleep at night, he investigates his own nocturnal activities. His quest for the truth ends in a shocking revelation.

== Cast ==
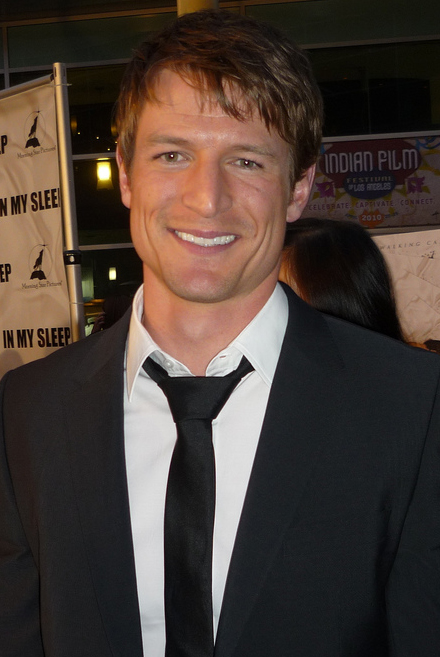
Winchester at the film's premiere

- Philip Winchester as Marcus
- Tim Draxl as Justin
- Lacey Chabert as Becky
- Kelly Overton as Ann
- Abigail Spencer as Gwen
- Beth Grant as Evelyn
- Michael Badalucco as Derek
- Tony Hale as Ben
- Kevin Kilner as Greg
- Amy Aquino as Detective Curwen
- Aidan Mitchell as Young Marcus
- Marcelle Larice as Carissa
- Allan Wasserman as Dr. Schwarz
- Alexandra Paul as Roxana
- Patrick Labyorteaux as Rob
- Bellamy Young as Olivia
- Kirsten Vangsness as Madge
- Shanna Collins as Jennifer
- Kevin Michael Curran as David
- Christopher Darga as Officer Etling
- Robert Joseph as Officer
- Larry Clarke as Officer Knachez
- Joe Nunez as Mr. Mather
- Vanessa Lee Evigan as Kelly
- Bunny Levine as Rachel

Foro De Cine
MovieWeb

== Production notes ==
Allen Wolf wrote, directed and produced In My Sleep. The film entered post production in August 2009, after having resolved several technical glitches before moving into sound design, music scoring and visual effects. Sound design was handled by Hollywood's Jonathan Miller, whose works include Independence Day, Saw, Narc, Trainspotting, The Hills Have Eyes Part II, and many others, while music scoring was completed by Conrad Pope, who also orchestrated Indiana Jones and the Kingdom of the Crystal Skull, Horton Hears a Who!, Julie & Julia and The Curious Case of Benjamin Button, and who recorded the score in Bulgaria and Los Angeles. Ralph Winter was the executive producer. Alyssa Weisberg, who won an Emmy for casting Lost and also cast Star Trek, was the casting director.

== Release ==
=== Premiere ===
On November 6, 2009, In My Sleep screened at the Fort Lauderdale Film Festival, where it won the Audience Choice Award. The film has sold to over seventy countries around the world and has been translated into German, French and Spanish.

=== Box office ===
In My Sleep has gotten a limited release, screening in more than fifteen cities and still in theatrical release in 2011, earning as much as $9,285 in one screening, becoming the #1 new indie movie of opening weekend in Los Angeles. As of July 2011 the film's total gross has come to $90,093.

== Critical response ==
On Rotten Tomatoes the film has an approval rating of 13% based on reviews from 16 critics. While critics conceded that the premise was interesting, they denounced the film as talky, dull, and technically shoddy. In a positive review, Duane Burges of The Hollywood Reporter wrote "A well-stirred titillation that will appeal to twentysomething audiences and movie-buff viewers who appreciate the pursued-pursuer, Hitchcockian style of suspenser. "In My Sleep" works because the protagonist, while flawed, is completely likable and honorable. Philip Winchester exudes an integrity, as well as a gritty determination, which makes us root for him. John Anderson wrote in Variety that it "boasts all the cerebral and aesthetic restraint of a West Hollywood dance club," and "Production values are dire, with too much lighting and not enough design." In the Los Angeles Times, Gary Goldstein wrote "Writer-director Allen Wolf loads In My Sleep with so much psychosexual baggage you wish he just focused on one emotional affliction to propel this mediocre whodunit," and concludes "It's ultimately all too contrived and superficial to feel convincing, despite the story's often lurid appeal."

== Awards ==
The film has won several festival awards: "Audience Award" at Fort Lauderdale Film Festival, "Best Feature Film" at Omaha Film Festival, "Best Narrative Film" at the Las Vegas Film Festival, "Audience Award" at the Kansas City Film Festival, "Gold Kahuna Award" at Honolulu Festival and was a finalist for "Best Feature" at Kansas City Film Festival and the Orlando Film Festival.
