= Gee Money =

American radio and television personality and actor (born 1986)

Gary Euton
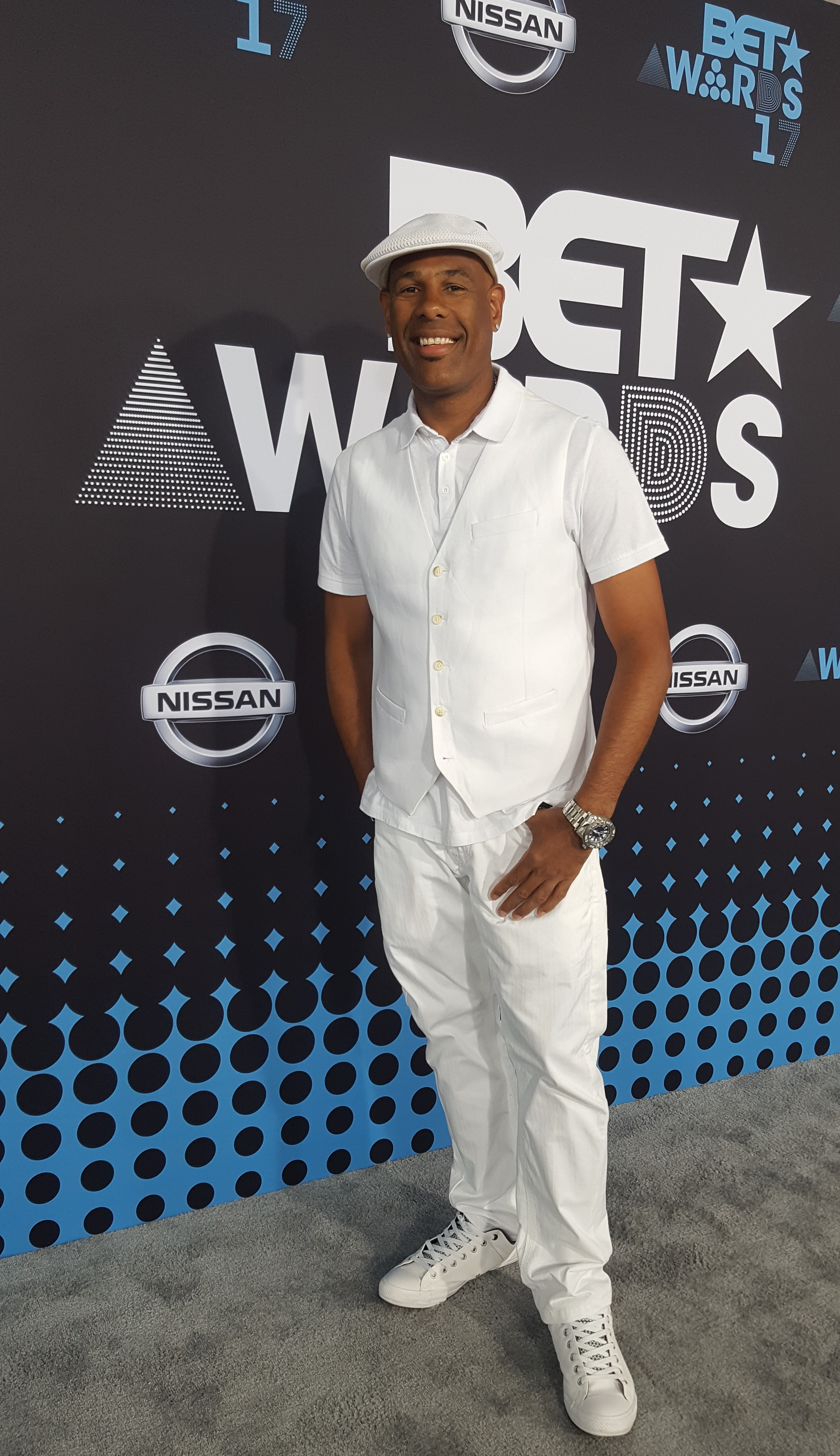
- Born: Gary Euton; September 25, 1968 (age 58); Staten Island, New York
- Other name: Gee Money
- Children: 3
- Presenting career
- Show: The AM/PM Workload Show
- Station: PJD5 (Laser 101 FM)
- Time slot: 10:00 - 2:00 pm, Weekdays
- Show: The Saturday Jumpoff
- Station: PJD5 (Laser 101 FM)
- Time slot: 8 pm – 12 midnight (Saturday)
- Style: Radio presenter
- Country: St. Maarten
- Website: www.facebook.com/mrgeemoney

Gary Euton, better known as Gee Money (born September 25, 1968 in Staten Island) is an American radio and television personality and actor. He was a radio personality in St. Maarten on Laser 101.1 FM.

== Biography ==
Gee Money was born on Staten Island and attended Susan E. Wagner High School where amongst his classmates was Rich Eisen from ESPN and the NFL Network. He also attended the State University of New York at Morrisville, also known as Morrisville State College where he graduated in 1989 with an associate degree in Applied Science.

Since 1999, he has hosted a weekday radio program, The AM/PM Workload Show, from FM radio station 101.1 Laser in St. Maarten. On his radio show, Gee Money has interviewed many celebrities including The Black Eyed Peas, Ne-Yo, Johnnie Cochran, Jimmy Cliff, Shaggy, Sean Paul, Damian Marley, Akon, Fat Joe, A.J. Calloway, Wyclef Jean, Fabolous and Bill Bellamy. Bill Bellamy is a good friend of Gee Money and is a frequent guest on his show when in St. Maarten. In 2004, Gee Money was voted radio host of the year and again in 2007.

In addition to radio broadcasting, Euton works as an event host and master of ceremonies. His engagements have included the Soul Beach Music Festival and events associated with Sint Maarten Carnival.

He also co-hosts The Handover with DJ Outkast. The programme covers trending online stories, local culture, and regional music, with particular attention to developments in the Caribbean.

Alongside his broadcasting and event-hosting work, Euton has appeared in several film productions, including Panman: Rhythm of the Palms, Mixing Nia, and Astoria Fix.
