= How You Look to Me =

- Directed by: J. Miller Tobin
- Written by: Bruce Romans
- Produced by: Jeremy Gold; Josh Liveright; Bruce Romans
- Starring: Frank Langella; Laura Allen
- Cinematography: Michael Caporale
- Edited by: Mitchel Stanley
- Music by: Veigar Margeirsson
- Release date: April 2005 (Newport Beach Film Festival)
- Running time: 104 minutes
- Country: United States
- Language: English

How You Look to Me is a 2005 American drama film directed by J. Miller Tobin and starring Frank Langella and Laura Allen.

== Cast ==
- Frank Langella as Professor Driskoll
- Laura Allen as Jane Carol Webb
