= Buttons: A Christmas Tale =

2018 film by Tim Janis

- Film poster
- Directed by: Tim Janis
- Starring: Ioan Gruffudd; Jane Seymour; Roma Downey; Abigail Spencer; Dick Van Dyke; Angela Lansbury
- Narrated by: Robert Redford; Kate Winslet
- Distributed by: Paramount Home Entertainment
- Release dates: December 8, 2018 (Theatrical); November 19, 2019 (Digital)
- Running time: 87 minutes
- Country: United States
- Language: English

Buttons: A Christmas Tale (also titled Buttons and Buttons: A New Musical Film) is a 2018 American fantasy drama film directed by Tim Janis, and starring Ioan Gruffudd, Jane Seymour, Roma Downey, Abigail Spencer, Dick Van Dyke, and Angela Lansbury (in her final film role released during her lifetime), with narration by Robert Redford and Kate Winslet.

== Plot ==
One Christmastime in Belford Falls, an Angel drops a letter at the home of Annabelle Hill and her husband Mr. Hill, telling them that a child named Emily is waiting to be adopted by them at the children's hospital.

The day before, a little orphan girl, Emily, was left in the care of Mother Genevieve. Emily wakes to find Rose at her bedside. Rose pours Emily a cup of hot chocolate and tells her a story about a girl named Annabelle Kingsley, who lived in Millbury, in the time of robber-barons. Annabelle contracted scarlet fever as a baby. In answer to her father’s prayer, an angel arrives at the Kingsley home, and promises to always be with Annabelle. The next morning, Annabelle’s fever miraculously breaks. Throughout her childhood, Annabelle is helped and cheered by her guardian angel, who appears whenever she is down and in need of encouragement. Before her father leaves on a fishing trip which will take him away from home for over a year, he gives Annabelle a music box which he says is magical, and that whenever she plays it, he will hear it on his ship and know she is thinking of him. During the 4th of July celebrations, Annabelle, missing her father, is determined to be unhappy, but her angel appears and cheers her up with a song.

Soon after, a letter arrives for her mother Sarah, informing her that William was caught in a severe storm, and that remnants of his ship were washed up on shore, with no survivors found. Annabelle is depressed by the loss of her father, barely speaking and refusing to eat. Sarah confides to the doctor that without William’s support, they cannot afford to keep the house. She writes to her step-sister Catherine Wentworth for help. Caring only for their reputations, all they offer is a position for Sarah at Mr. Wentworth's textile mill. Before leaving Millbury, Annabelle, disillusioned by the idea of hope, hides the music box her father gave her, and vows to forget angels forever. She and her mother move into a grimy rooming-house, which they share with a woman sick from mill fever and her two children. After a year working the mill, Sarah’s health begins to fail. Before she dies, Sarah tells Annabelle that everyone has a guardian angel that is with them through their entire lives, and that she must believe in them and know that she will never be alone.

After her mother's death, Annabelle briefly lives with her aunt before being sent to live at a boarding house and work at the mill with the other orphans. She is assigned to sew buttons onto garments, a job she does for no pay, as she lacks the skills to run the machines. The other girls taunt her, calling her Buttons. One girl takes the glass dog her mother gave her, but another brings it back to her. Annabelle runs away from the mill and lives on the street. On a cold Christmas eve, she meets her angel, whom she offers the last of her bread. Because she has stopped believing in angels, she doesn’t recognize him. On her way to the church to get warm, she falls through thin ice atop the frozen river and nearly drowns, but her angel pulls her out and leaves her on her steps of the church. Elizabeth Browning hears the angel knock and goes into the snow to bring Annabelle inside. Having lost their youngest daughter to scarlet fever several months before, Mr. and Mrs. Browning adopt Annabelle and the other girls at the mill.

As Rose finishes the story, Emily expresses her wish for a family by Christmas. The next morning, Annabelle and her husband arrive at the hospital with the letter from Rose telling them that there is a child there for them to adopt, but the doctor tells them that no one with that name works there. They are about to leave when Annabelle sees her angel reading the paper. She asks the doctor if there is a child named Emily there. Annabelle reads Emily the letter, and asks her if she is waiting for them. Emily embraces her new family as Rose and the Angel look on.

== Cast ==
- Dick Van Dyke as Unexpected Visitor
- Angela Lansbury as Rose
- Noelle E. Parker as Emily
- Kate Winslet as Narrator
- Robert Redford as Narrator
- Abigail Spencer as Adult Annabelle/Annabelle Hill
- Paul Greene as Mr. Hill
- Alvia Clark as Young Annabelle
- Jane Seymour as Mrs. Browning
- Roma Downey as Mother Gertrude
- Julia Burrows as Sarah Kingsley
- Ioan Gruffudd as William Kingsley
- Katie McGrath as Mrs. Wentworth
- Robert Picardo as Mr. Wentworth
- Charles Shaughnessy as Mr. Browning
- John de Lancie as Johnson

== Release ==
The film premiered on December 8, 2018. It was then released on Digital on November 19, 2019 and on DVD on December 3, 2019.

== See also ==
- List of films about angels
- List of Christmas films
