= Tim Janis =

American composer(born 20th century

- Born: 20th century
- Occupation: composer (new-age music)
- Website: www.timjanis.com

Tim Janis (born 20th century) is an American composer with ten Billboard-charting CDs, over one million albums sold, five television specials, and a constant touring presence.

== Career ==
On November 30 , 2012, Janis produced "The American Christmas Carol" concert for Kate Winslet’s Golden Hat Foundation, supported by Sarah McLachlan, Loreena McKennitt, Andrea Corr, Hayley Westenra, Sleepy Man Banjo Boys, an orchestra, and a choir in Carnegie Hall. He produced similar concerts for 2013 and 2014.

In 2018, he directed the musical film Buttons: A Christmas Tale, whose proceeds benefit The Golden Hat Foundation.

== Selected discography ==
- Ghost Town (1992)
- Along the Shore of Acadia (1996)
- Etain (1996)
- Christmas (1999)
- December Morning (1999)
- Flowers in October (1999)
- Water's Edge (2000)
- American Composer in Concert (2001)
- Music of Hope (2001)
- Thousand Summers (2002)
- Flowers in October [bonus DVD] (2003)
- Across Two Oceans (2003)
- Beautiful America (2003)
- American Horizons (2005)
- Christmas Piano Collection (2005)
- Simple Gift of Christmas (2003)
- Coming Home (2005)
- The Promise (2005)
- Winter's Eve (2005)
- Coastal America (2006)
- Quiet Shore (2006)
- Wondrous Christmas (2006)
- The American Christmas Carol (2006)
- Gifts of the Heart (2007)
- An Enchanted Evening (2008)
- Celebrate America (2009)
- The Journey Home (2010)
- Celebrate America At Christmas (2011)
- Celtic Heart (2019)
- Autumn in Tuscany (2022)
- Celtic Lands (2022)

== Public-television specials ==
- Tim Janis: Celebrate America MONTANA (2010), with fourteen Montana high-school choral groups across Montana
- Tim Janis: An American Composer in Concert (2002)
- Tim Janis: Beautiful America (narrated by George Clooney) (2004)
- Tim Janis: Coastal America (narrated by George Clooney) (2006)
- Tim Janis: The American Christmas Carol (narrated by James Earl Jones) (2006)
- Tim Janis: An Enchanted Evening (2007)
- Tim Janis: Celtic Heart (2019)

== See also ==
- List of American composers
- List of new-age music artists
- List of people from Maine
