= J. Miller Tobin =

American film director

- Born: John Miller Tobin; January 13, 1961 (age 65); Hutchinson County, Texas, U.S.
- Occupations: Television director; television producer
- Years active: 1988–present

John Miller Tobin (born January 13, 1961) is an American television director and producer. As a director, Tobin has worked on the television series Oz, The Agency, Numb3rs, Terminator: The Sarah Connor Chronicles, Supernatural, 90210, Gossip Girl, Pretty Little Liars, What/If and The Vampire Diaries; on the latter of which he also served as a producer.

Tobin has directed the film How You Look to Me. He has also worked as an assistant director on number of feature films, including Fresh (1994) and The 24 Hour Woman (1999).
