= Cherry (2010 film) =

2010 American Comedy film

- Film poster
- Directed by: Jeffrey Fine
- Starring: Kyle Gallner; Laura Allen
- Music by: Bobby Johnston
- Release date: March 12, 2010
- Running time: 99 minutes
- Country: United States
- Language: English

Cherry is a 2010 American comedy film directed by Jeffrey Fine and starring Kyle Gallner and Laura Allen. It was released on SXSW 2010.

== Plot ==
17-year-old Aaron Milton comes from an engineering family and begins studying engineering as a freshman at Yale University, but is more interested in art. He clashes with his roommate William, but befriends fellow students Darcy and Linda, a single mother in her 30s. Aaron has dinner with Linda and meets her 14-year-old daughter, Beth, and Linda's boyfriend Wes, a police officer. Aaron develops feelings for Linda, while Beth develops feelings for him. After a party, Aaron almost has sex with Darcy, but is unable to go through with it. Beth visits his dorm and attempts to seduce him, but he declines and drives her home.

Aaron struggles in his classes and in his relationships with his parents, Linda, Beth and Darcy. Wes proposes to Linda, who is uncertain, while Beth is enraged by the news due to her dislike of Wes. An argument and fight leads to Linda breaking up with Wes after he accidentally hits her, and angrily driving away with Aaron and Beth. Wes follows them and Linda flees, resulting in a car crash which leaves Linda injured. As Linda recovers, Aaron comforts Beth, and finds himself developing feelings for her as well.

After the accident, Aaron’s parents visit him to question him about the accident and to discuss his falling grades. Aaron asks his parents to meet Linda after learning that his mother Susan disapproves of their friendship, which leads to more arguments at Linda's place. Aaron refuses to leave school, and chooses to stay with Linda and Beth instead of going home with his parents. Aaron and Linda have sex that night, but Aaron is left feeling upset after Linda imagines him as Wes, while Beth is furious with Aaron after overhearing them. Aaron returns to his dorm and finds William having sex with Darcy, although William later informs him that Darcy is actually more interested in Aaron.

A devastated Beth runs away from home and goes to stay with Ray, a local drug dealer. After being informed by Linda, Aaron goes looking for Beth, and finds her being held against her will in Ray’s apartment. With Wes's help, Aaron rescues Beth and brings her back to Linda's house. Aaron later calls Susan and reconciles with her.

With help from William and after taking inspiration from a conversation with Beth, Aaron wins an engineering competition for one of his classes by constructing a contraption that allows him to walk on water, enabling him to maintain his academic scholarship. He later discovers that Linda has decided to move to Jacksonville with Beth to stay with Linda's mother, wanting to turn her life around so she can be a better mother to Beth. Beth promises Aaron that she will reunite with him after she turns 18. After bidding a tearful farewell to Linda and Beth, Aaron returns to school and reconciles with Darcy.

== Cast ==
- Kyle Gallner as Aaron Milton
- Laura Allen as Linda
- Britt Robertson as Beth
- Matt Walsh as Prof. Van Auken
- Esai Morales as Wes
- D.C. Pierson as William / “Wild Bill”
- Zosia Mamet as Darcy

== Production ==
Cherry was filmed in October 2008 in Kalamazoo, Michigan.

== Reception ==
On Rotten Tomatoes, the film holds an approval rating of 64% based on 11 reviews. Kimberley Jones, in her review for the Austin Chronicle said that "Despite some tonal inconsistencies and ill-fitting stabs at whimsy, all-around good performances, Fine's snappy script, and Michael Hoskins' original illustrations elevate Cherry into a sensitively felt and fundamentally sweet coming-of-age pic."
