= The Cabinet of Dr. Caligari (2005 film) =

- Theatrical release poster
- Directed by: David Lee Fisher
- Screenplay by: David Lee Fisher
- Story by: Hans Janowitz; Carl Mayer
- Produced by: Paula Elins; Leonard McLeod
- Starring: Judson Pearce Morgan; Daamen J. Krall; Doug Jones; Lauren Birkell
- Cinematography: Christopher Duddy
- Edited by: David Lee Fisher
- Music by: Eban Schletter
- Production company: Highlander Films
- Distributed by: Image Entertainment
- Release date: October 22, 2005
- Running time: 76 minutes
- Country: United States
- Language: English

The Cabinet of Dr. Caligari is a 2005 American horror film directed by David Lee Fisher, who also co-wrote the film's screenplay, and is a remake of the 1920 silent film of the same name. It was released in the U.S. at the Screamfest Film Festival on October 22, where it won three prizes: the Audience Choice Award, Best Cinematography and Best Special Effects.

== Plot ==
The plot is similar to that of the original film with extra dialogue scenes. The film tells the story of the deranged Dr. Caligari and his faithful sleepwalking minion Cesare and their connection to a string of murders in a German mountain village, Holstenwall. The movie features a "frame story" in which the body of the plot is presented as a flashback, as told by Francis.

The narrator, Francis, and his friend Alan visit a carnival in the village where they see Dr. Caligari and Cesare, whom the doctor is displaying as an attraction. Caligari brags that Cesare can answer any question he is asked. When Alan asks Cesare how long he has to live, Cesare tells Alan that he will die tomorrow at dawn — a prophecy which turns out to be fulfilled.

Francis, along with his girlfriend Jane, investigate Caligari and Cesare, which eventually leads to Jane's kidnapping by Cesare. Caligari orders Cesare to kill Jane, but the hypnotized slave refuses after her beauty captivates him. He carries Jane out of her house, leading Jane's father and brother on a chase. Cesare is stabbed to death after being pursued by Jane's brother, and Francis discovers that Caligari had created an illusion of Cesare to distract him.

Francis discovers that "Caligari" is the head of the local insane asylum, and with the help of his colleagues discovers that he is obsessed with the story of a medieval Dr. Caligari, who used a somnambulist to murder people as a traveling act. After being confronted with the dead Cesare, Caligari breaks down, reveals his mania and is imprisoned in his own asylum.

The "twist ending" reveals that Francis' flashback is his fantasy: The man he claims is Caligari is indeed his doctor in the asylum, who, after this revelation of the source of his patient's delusion, claims to be able to cure him.

== Cast ==
- Judson Pearce Morgan as Francis Geist
- Daamen J. Krall as Dr. Daamen Caligari
- Doug Jones as Cesare
- Lauren Birkell as Jane Stern
- Neil Hopkins as Alan
- William Gregory Lee as Joseph Stern
- Randy Mulkey as Inspector
- Time Winters as Dr. Gabriel Stern
- Richard Herd as Commissioner Hans Raab
- Tim Russ as Town clerk
- Brian Farber as Burly Man #2/Cloaked man

== Release ==
The film was released on DVD by Image on October 22, 2005.

== Reception ==
On Rotten Tomatoes, the film holds an approval rating of 43% based on 7 reviews, with a weighted average rating of 5/10. On Metacritic, which assigns a normalized rating to reviews, the film has a weighted average score of 62 out of 100, based on 5 critics, indicating "Generally favorable reviews". Neil Genzlinger from the New York Times noted that Fisher had "out-disoriented the original", although he felt it wasn't in the way the director intended. Genzlinger concluded his review by calling the film "Scary, disturbing, intriguing, all at once" TV Guide's Maitland McDonagh awarded the film 3/5 stars, commending Hopkins, Kraal, and Jones' performances as well as the digital recreation of the original film's artificial backdrops. R. Emmet Sweeney from The Village Voice gave the film a negative review, writing, "Although technically impressive, the remake is dramatically inert, as the set becomes a motionless backdrop to theatrical line readings instead of a pulsing manifestation of diseased minds. It’s Caligari embalmed. The plot is followed to the letter, and as Cesare, Doug Jones displays a wounded sensitivity that honors Conrad Veidt’s celebrated turn. But there’s nothing here to keep you from renting Robert Wiene’s timeless masterpiece instead." Ed Gonzalez from Slant Magazine offered similar criticism, stating that the director's determination to recreate the original film resulted in revealing the original's "unsophisticated storytelling and limited feeling".
