= Yancy Spencer III =

American surfer (1950–2011)

Personal information
- Born: Yancy Bailey Spencer III; July 2, 1950 Roanoke, Virginia, U.S.
- Died: February 14, 2011 (aged 60) El Cerrito, California, U.S.
- Website: innerlightsurf.com

Surfing career
- Sport: Surfing

Yancy Bailey Spencer III (July 2, 1950 – February 14, 2011) was a surfer from Pensacola, Florida, United States, who was widely regarded as the founder of Gulf Coast surfing.

== Family ==
He was the son of Yancy Bailey Spencer Jr. (North Carolina, 1929–2010), who served in the United States Navy between 1938 and 1962, who was a Seaman First Class (S1c) in World War II who reached the rank of Chief Petty Officer (CPO), and wife Patricia Lee Rice.

He was married to his wife Lydia Ann Brown, daughter of Eugene Fuller "Gene" Brown II and wife Maxine Boatright.

He had three children, including Yancy Spencer IV, actress Abigail Spencer and Sterling Spencer.

== Death ==
Yancy died after surfing at County Line Beach, California, on February 14, 2011. The cause of death was revealed to be a heart attack.

A statue of him was erected on Pensacola Beach, Florida.
