= Judson Pearce Morgan =

American actor

- Born: Santa Barbara, California
- Occupation(s): Actor, film producer and director
- Spouse: Kelly Overton (m. 2004)
- Children: 3

Judson Pearce Morgan is an American actor, entrepreneur, film producer and director.

== Career ==
His film The Collective, written and directed with his wife Kelly Overton, has received awards and recognition at film festivals in 2008 and 2009, among which are Audience Award at the 2008 Brooklyn International Film Festival, both First runner-up Best HD Editing in a Feature and Honorable Mention for Best Cinematography in a Feature at the 2008 HDFest, the "Purple Heart" at the 2008 Zero Film Festival, the Audience Award for Best Feature Film at the 2008 Trimedia Film festival, and the Gold Kahuna Award at the 2009 Honolulu International Film Festival.

Morgan is also a serial entrepreneur, starting a video agency and an online jewelry company.

== As producer ==
- Imaginary Bitches (2008)
- The Collective writer and director

== As director ==
- The Collective (2008)
- The Wager (2007)

== Filmography ==
- Under New Management (2009)
- Outsource (2008)
- Cold Case (2007) (TV)
- The Cabinet of Dr. Caligari (2005)
- The Double (2005)
- The Studio (2005) (TV)
- Angel (2003) (TV)
- Unhasped (2003)
- As the World Turns (2001) (TV)
- Strangers with Candy (2000) (TV)

== Reception ==
When reviewing Morgan's film The Collective, Joshua Tanzer of Off Off Off wrote "Director/cinematographer Morgan, who has been primarily an actor up to now, has done a fantastic job behind the camera." of his acting in The Cabinet of Dr. Caligari, Joe Leydon of Variety wrote "Morgan pitches his performance at a level somewhere between stylization and self-parody."

== Personal life ==
Morgan married actress Kelly Overton in March 2004. In January 2011, Kelly gave birth to their daughter, Ever Evangeline Morgan. It was confirmed during San Diego Comic-Con 2017 that Overton was pregnant during the production of the second season of Van Helsing. Overton gave birth to their second daughter in July 2017
