= Kelly Overton =

American actress

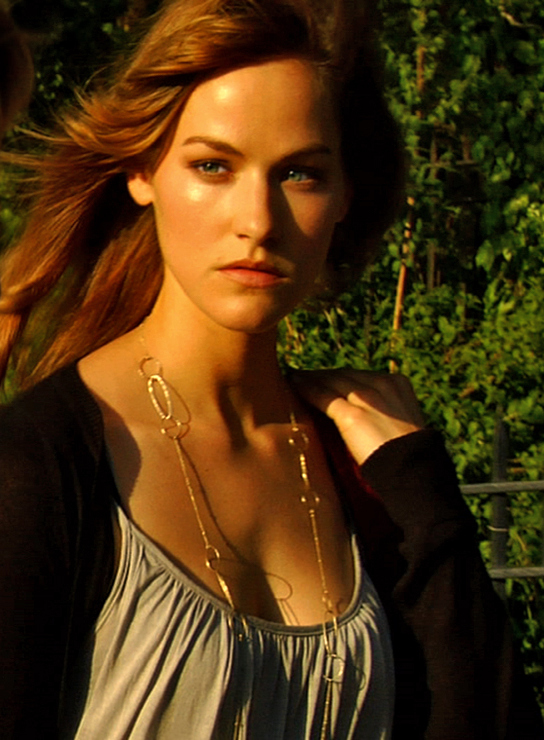
- Kelly Overton in The Collective in 2008
- Occupation: Actress
- Years active: 2000–present
- Spouse: Judson Pearce Morgan (m. 2004)
- Children: 3

Kelly Overton is an American actress. She is known for portraying Vanessa Van Helsing in the 2016 Syfy fantasy drama series Van Helsing.

== Early life and education ==
Overton grew up in Wilbraham, Massachusetts. After graduating from Minnechaug Regional High School in 1997 she went on study at the American Academy of Dramatic Arts in New York City, where she graduated with their highest honor, The Charles Jehlinger Award.

== Career ==
She has performed off-Broadway, in regional Shakespeare, and on several TV shows. She began in national television in 2000 in the role of Rainn Wilkins on All My Children for several months. Then in 2002 she returned to theater on Broadway where she debuted in the original stage cast of The Graduate as an understudy for several roles, eventually replacing Alicia Silverstone in the role of Elaine Robinson, opposite Kathleen Turner and Jason Biggs.

In 2008, with husband Judson Pearce Morgan, she wrote, directed, produced and starred in The Collective. She plays Christie Monteiro in the 2009 film adaptation of the fighting game series Tekken. She appeared in the HBO series True Blood as werewolf Rikki Naylor and co-starred as Ann in "In My Sleep."

In 2016 Overton was cast as Vanessa Helsing, the lead character, in the Syfy television series Van Helsing.

== Reception ==
Of her role as Andrea Barton in the Numbers episode "Hollywood Homicide", reviewer Todd Mason of TV Guide wrote, "Kelly Overton excelled in her small role...". Of her directorial debut (with husband Judson Pearce Morgan) on the film The Collective, reviewer Joshua Tanzer wrote, "The Collective is beautifully shot, well crafted", while Farley Elliott of LAist wrote, "The story, while not frighteningly original, is definitely captivating, and the directing is superb. Kelly Overton, who helped to pen the film, is captivating and you really want to see her succeed".

== Personal life ==
Overton married fellow actor Judson Pearce Morgan in March 2004. In 2011, Overton gave birth to their daughter. It was confirmed during San Diego Comic-Con 2017 that Overton was pregnant during the production of the second season of Van Helsing. Overton gave birth to her second daughter in July 2017. Overton announced the birth of a son in August 2019.

== Filmography ==
=== Film ===
Year	Title	Role	Notes
2003	It Runs in the Family	Erica	
2004	Breaking Dawn	Dawn	
2005	The Ring Two	Betsy	
2006	You Did What?	Day	
2007	The Wager	Tessa	
2008	The Collective	Tyler Clarke	also co-writer, co-producer, co-director
2009	Under New Management	Julie Capp	
2009	Tekken	Christie Monteiro	
2010	In My Sleep	Ann	

=== Television ===
Year	Title	Role	Notes
2000–2001	All My Children	Rain Wilkins	Recurring role, 17 episodes
2003	Without a Trace	Audrey Rose	Episode: "There Goes the Bride"
2003	The Practice	Debbie Huber	Episode: "We the People"
2004	The Division	Cheryl Madison	Episode: "Crawl Space"
2004	Wedding Daze	Dahlia Landry	Television film
2005	The Studio	Heather Falls	Episode: "Pilot"
2006	Desolation Canyon	Olivia Kendrick	Television film
2006	CSI: NY	Lynette Richmont	Episode: "Wasted"
2006	Close to Home	Lori Hulse	Episode: "Still a Small Town"
2006	Desperation	Cynthia Smith	Television film
2006	Twenty Questions	Kate Lewis	Television film
2007	Cold Case	Johanna Kimball (1981)	Episode: "Blood on the Tracks"
2007	Criminal Minds	Ranger Lizzie Evans	Episode: "Open Season"
2007	Numbers	Andrea Barton / Tracy Meade	Episode: "Hollywood Homicide"
2008	Psych	Ashley	Episode: "There Might Be Blood"
2009	Medium	Robin Aaronson	Episode: "Soul Survivor"
2009	CSI: Miami	Kaitlyn Sawyer	Episode: "Dead on Arrival"
2009	NCIS	Metro Det. Megan Hanley	Episode: "The Inside Man"
2009–2010	Three Rivers	Det. Rena Yablonski	Episodes: "Alone Together", "Every Breath You Take"
2010	Madso's War	Cheryl Keane	Television film
2011	In Plain Sight	Grace Haddick / Grace Littleton	Episode: "A Womb with a View"
2011	Ricochet	Det. Deedee Bowen	Television film
2012–2013	Beauty and the Beast	Claire Sinclair	Episodes: "Saturn Returns", "On Thin Ice", "Trust No One"
2012–2013	True Blood	Rikki Naylor	Recurring role, 14 episodes
2014	Unforgettable	Lt. Col. Emily Swain	Episode: "The Haircut"
2014	Back to Christmas	Ali Pennebaker	Television film
2015	Legends	Nina Brenner	Main role (season 2)
2016–2021	Van Helsing	Vanessa Krauser / Helsing	Lead role
2023	S.W.A.T.	Eva	Episode: "Pariah"

=== Music videos ===
- Terrified (2010) from Katharine McPhee, as Herself
