= Marie-Luise Schramm =

German actress

- Born: 2 May 1984 (age 42); East Berlin, East Germany
- Occupation: Actress

Marie-Luise Schramm (born 2 May 1984) is a German actress who specializes in dubbing.

She is the only daughter of actor Bernd Schramm and has three older brothers. She planned on becoming a football player, but knee problems forced her to give this up. To this day, she is an enthusiastic supporter of Hertha BSC Berlin.

== Filmography ==
=== Television animation ===
- Angela Anaconda (Angela Anaconda (Sue Rose))
- Avatar: The Last Airbender (Toph (Jessie Flower))
- Bluey (Socks)
- Bubble Guppies (Nonny)
- Digimon Adventure (Kari Kamiya (Kae Araki))
- Dr. Slump (second series) (Arale Norimaki (Taeko Kawata))
- Growing Up Creepie (Carla (Stephanie Anne Mills))
- Texhnolyze (Ran (Shizuka Itō))
- W.I.T.C.H. (Taranee Cook (Kali Troy))
- Kitty Is Not a Cat ((Kitty))

=== Live action ===
- Alice in Wonderland (Alice Kingsleigh)
- Alice Through the Looking Glass (Alice Kingsleigh)
- 24 (Linda (Agnes Bruckner))
- Alias (Kelly McNeil (Agnes Bruckner))
- Desperate Housewives (Sarah (Mae Whitman))
- Grey's Anatomy (Heather Douglas (Mae Whitman))
- Mrs. Doubtfire (Natalie Hillard (Mara Wilson))
- Thief (Tammi Deveraux (Mae Whitman))
