= Pilot (Terriers) =

- Terriers episode
- Episode no.: Season 1 Episode 1
- Directed by: Craig Brewer
- Written by: Ted Griffin
- Cinematography by: Curtis Wehr
- Editing by: Gregg Featherman
- Production code: 1WAD79
- Original air date: September 8, 2010
- Running time: 52 minutes

Guest appearances
- Gareth Williams as Mickey Gosney; Christopher Cousins as Robert Lindus; Rachel Miner as Eleanor Gosney; Lee Reherman as Randy Oaks

Episode chronology
← Previous —	Next → "Dog and Pony"

"Pilot" is the series premiere of the American crime comedy-drama television series Terriers. The episode was written by series creator Ted Griffin, and directed by Craig Brewer. It was first broadcast on FX in the United States on September 8, 2010.

The series is set in Ocean Beach, San Diego and focuses on ex-cop and recovering alcoholic Hank Dolworth (Donal Logue) and his best friend, former criminal Britt Pollack (Michael Raymond-James), who both decide to open an unlicensed private investigation business. In the episode, an old friend of Hank asks for their help in finding his missing daughter, who worked for a powerful real estate developer.

According to Nielsen Media Research, the episode was seen by an estimated 1.61 million household viewers and gained a 0.5/2 ratings share among adults aged 18–49, making it the most-watched episode of the series. The premiere received extremely positive reviews from critics, who praised the writing and performances, with Logue's and Raymond-James' chemistry being singled out for praise.

== Plot ==
In Ocean Beach, San Diego, ex-cop and recovering alcoholic Hank Dolworth (Donal Logue) and his best friend, former criminal Britt Pollack (Michael Raymond-James), surveil a house for their unlicensed private investigation business. hired by a friend of Britt to recover a dog from the home of her ex-husband. While Hank distracts the owner, Randy Oaks (Lee Reherman), Britt sneaks into the house and takes the dog, Winston, escaping just as Oaks discovers their scheme.

Forced to keep Winston for the rest of the day, Hank is contacted by his ex-wife Gretchen (Kimberly Quinn), who asks him to bail out Hank's old partner and drinking buddy, Mickey (Gareth Williams), from jail. She also informs him that she is selling out their old house. After bailing him out, Mickey tells Hank that he was contacted by his estranged daughter Eleanor (Rachel Miner), who him for money and a gun. Noting the fear in her voice, Mickey left to meet her, leading to his arrest for possession.

After agreeing to help find Eleanor, Hank and Britt visit Eleanor's roommate, who informs them that Eleanor has been absent for one week and that someone broke into their house and turned over Eleanor’s room. Discovering a parking ticket, they check on the location, a mansion owned by local real estate developer Robert Lindus (Christopher Cousins). Lindus also tells the pair that Eleanor, who works for him, has been missing — and has taken something of vital importance to him. He pays them $20,000 to find her and recover the stolen material. Hank uses the money to place an offer on his old house, much to Britt's annoyance.

Tracing Eleanor's cellphone to a beach, Hank and Britt find a lifeguard stand. Assuming Eleanor is inside, they instead discover a man dead of a gunshot wound and Eleanor’s cellphone. To complicate matters, their car is towed with Winston inside. After recovering Winston and the car, they are confronted by Detective Mark Gustafson (Rockmond Dunbar), Hank’s last partner, who suspects them of searching for Eleanor while he investigates the dead man, which they deny. After leaving Winston with Britt's friend, they find that Eleanor’s cellphone contains a sex tape of her and Lindus.

Hank returns home and discovers a high Eleanor, who holds him at gunpoint. She claims she did not kill the man, who was actually her boyfriend. Hank infers that they tried to blackmail Lindus for the money, but he responded by killing her boyfriend and trying to look for Eleanor. The end of the video also shows Lindus taking a phone call and telling the person inside information that a major development deal in the area is unlikely to happen. After contacting Hank's attorney, Maggie Lefferts (Jamie Denbo), for help, Hank and Britt are forced to fend off some of Lindus' henchmen. Hank leaves Eleanor at a train station so she can leave town and get clean like he did. Hank meets with Gretchen, who allows him to buy their old house. She also reveals that she is going to marry someone else, disappointing him.

Hank asks Gustafson to check Lindus' house but he refuses to do so. Their talk is interrupted when they are informed that Mickey has died from a drug overdose in an apparent suicide. Hank and Britt meet with Lindus on a development site. They give him Eleanor’s cellphone and inform her that she left town, something that pleases Lindus, who gives them another paycheck. Hank coldly states to Lindus that he knows he is involved in Mickey's death and will destroy his life. The next day, Gustafson and the police get a warrant for his house. Searching it, they find the gun used to kill Eleanor’s boyfriend, unaware that Hank and Britt had recovered it from her and placed it there. Lindus is arrested, while Hank and Britt ponder over whether there will be consequences for their actions.

== Production ==
=== Development ===
Development on the series started in August 2008, with FX announcing that Shawn Ryan and Ted Griffin were working on a series described as "a comedic drama about a private eye." In June 2009, the series was given a pilot order, now officially titled Terriers. In October 2009, FX officially announced a 13-episode series order for Terriers.

=== Casting ===
In July 2009, Donal Logue was the first actor to join the series. The next month, Michael Raymond-James, Kimberly Quinn, Laura Allen and Rockmond Dunbar joined the series as series regulars.

== Reception ==
=== Viewers ===
The episode was watched by 1.61 million viewers, earning a 0.5/2 in the 18-49 rating demographics on the Nielson ratings scale. This means that 0.5 percent of all households with televisions watched the episode, while 2 percent of all households watching television at that time watched it.

=== Critical reviews ===
"Pilot" received extremely positive reviews from critics. Matt Fowler of IGN gave the episode a "great" 8.5 out of 10 and wrote, "It's a shame that, for the most part, TV pilots usually represent the very least a series can offer; no matter the series. Sure, there have been occasional exceptions over the years, but most pilots, by nature, are weighed down with rushed introductions, bloated exposition, and a general feeling of 'once we get past this beginning part we can get into the good stuff.' I've infused myself with low expectations. But then a show like FX's Terriers comes along and presents a standard, time-honored TV genre in a gritty and fresh manner and the televisual world is made whole again."

Noel Murray of The A.V. Club gave the episode an "A−" grade and wrote, "The show has style, flavor, and man does it ever have wit. Judging by the first two episodes, Terriers may end up being the most quotable new show of the fall."

Alan Sepinwall of HitFix wrote, "A very strong start, very well-directed by Craig Brewer of Hustle & Flow and Black Snake Moan fame, and with a lot of fine small moments like Hank simultaneously figuring out why his ex wants to sell the house and trying to keep her from seeing how much that reason breaks his heart." James Poniewozik of TIME wrote, "Terriers is a welcome complement to some of cable's bigger, more operatic dramas: it doesn't go for the gut-wrenching violence of Sons of Anarchy or the brooding emotion of Mad Men, but it also doesn't aim for simple high-gloss entertainment. Instead, it turns its small scale into an asset, charming viewers as Hank and Britt aim for something greater in their jobs and, therefore, their lives. In the process, Terriers becomes pretty darn good as well."

Matt Richenthal of TV Fanatic gave the episode a 4.7 star rating out of 5 and wrote, "The premiere didn't suffer from the clunky dialogue that plagues so many other pilots, as many shows awkwardly throw a lot of information at viewers in order to educate them about their characters. Instead, Terriers just lets us see a day in the life of these men, specifically Hank, and I turned off the TV confident that I knew the former detective pretty well." Cory Barker of TV Overmind wrote, "I imagine that Terriers will take a few more episodes to get its footing and define the relationship between the two leads before jumping back into the ongoing arc, but unlike last spring's Justified, I think FX will be fine to let this series do its thing. You should absolutely watch this series."
