= Fustercluck =

- Terriers episode
- Episode no.: Season 1 Episode 4
- Directed by: Michael Offer
- Written by: Jon Worley
- Cinematography by: Curtis Wehr
- Editing by: Kimberly Ray
- Production code: 1WAD03
- Original air date: September 29, 2010
- Running time: 43 minutes

Guest appearances
- Karina Logue as Stephanie Dallworth; Christopher Cousins as Robert Lindus; Jackie Debatin as Josephine Lindus; Channon Roe as William; Jonathan Schmock as Informant

Episode chronology
← Previous "Change Partners"	Next → "Manifest Destiny"

"Fustercluck" is the fourth episode of the American crime comedy-drama television series Terriers. The episode was written by Jon Worley, and directed by Michael Offer. It was first broadcast on FX in the United States on September 29, 2010.

The series is set in Ocean Beach, San Diego and focuses on ex-cop and recovering alcoholic Hank Dolworth (Donal Logue) and his best friend, former criminal Britt Pollack (Michael Raymond-James), who operate an unlicensed private investigation business. In the episode, Hank and Britt steal bearer bonds for jailed businessman Robert Lindus in exchange for learning who killed Hank’s former partner.

According to Nielsen Media Research, the episode was seen by an estimated 0.649 million household viewers and gained a 0.3/1 ratings share among adults aged 18–49. The episode received critical acclaim, with critics praising the writing, acting, tension, humor, and climax.

== Plot ==
Hank (Donal Logue) and Britt (Michael Raymond-James) are approached by Josephine (Jackie Debatin), the wife of Robert Lindus (Christopher Cousins), who asks them to visit Lindus in jail. Lindus claims that he wasn't involved in Mickey's death and expresses fear that his family may be threatened by his business partners. In exchange for the name of who really killed Mickey, he asks the pair to steal $250,000 from him.

Despite Britt's reservations, Hank accepts the offer. Josephine tells them that they have to steal bearer bonds hidden in Lindus’ now-sealed office. She promises them a payment of $100,000 as well as the person’s name. Hank catches the person hiding in his attic: his schizophrenic sister Stephanie (Karina Logue), who has been living there for four weeks after leaving her psychiatric hospital in Oregon.

Leaving Steph in the care of Katie (Laura Allen), Hank and Britt reach Lindus' office. Britt sneaks in, replaces the security company contact info with Hank’s phone number, and destroys the office's alarm, activating it. Police arrive and believe it to be a failed robbery attempt, unwittingly calling Hank to replace the unit. Claiming that he needs the room closed to complete his work, Hank steals both the bearer bonds and a key from the office's hidden safe.

The next day, they give the bonds and key to Josephine, receiving their share and the supposed name of the person who killed Mickey, drug dealer William (Channon Roe). Hank confronts William at his house, who claims that he was forced by man in a tan suit and large sunglasses to inject an already intoxicated Mickey with heroin. Learning that Lindus was bailed out of jail, Hank and Britt to catch the Lindus family attempting to board a private plane at the airport. They take Lindus, demanding he reveal who really killed Mickey and what the key is for. Lindus brings them to a PO Box which contains an envelope. Lindus attempts to flee the pair and is hit and seriously wounded by a passing car.

Avoiding the hospital, the pair take Lindus to Hank's house. Lindus tells them the envelope contains an environmental report for a construction site where Mickey worked security. Before Lindus can say anything else, he dies from his wounds. Mark (Rockmond Dunbar) visits the house, as Josephine called the police on Hank and Britt, but they are able to hide the body before he asks the pair to come with him. After Mark, Hank, and Britt leave the house, Steph stares at the dead Lindus in the bathroom.

== Reception ==
=== Viewers ===
The episode was watched by 0.649 million viewers, earning a 0.3/1 in the 18-49 rating demographics on the Nielson ratings scale. This means that 0.3 percent of all households with televisions watched the episode, while 1 percent of all households watching television at that time watched it. This was a 14% increase in viewership from the previous episode, which was watched by 0.568 million viewers with a 0.2/1 in the 18-49 rating demographics.

=== Critical reviews ===
"Fustercluck" received critical acclaim. Noel Murray of The A.V. Club gave the episode an "A" grade and wrote, "And like its top cable contemporaries, Terriers grounds its crazy plot twists in the strengths, flaws and moral codes of its characters. In 'Fustercluck', for example, just about every move Hank makes in the episode can be traced back to that pathetic box containing Mickey's entire life."

Alan Sepinwall of HitFix wrote, "'Fustercluck' felt like the strongest Terriers episode yet. After two weeks of self-contained cases mixed with ongoing personal stories, we're hip-deep in Lindus shenanigans again, and I think the balance has been good for the show. It's important to see the guys' work not always revolve around this big case, but at the same time the stakes do get higher in this situation, the tension is greater, and at times the laughs are bigger." Matt Richenthal of TV Fanatic gave the episode a 4.2 star rating out of 5 and wrote, "I have to applaud the writers for going at such a perfect pace over the first four episodes. After laying the groundwork for the Hank and Britt friendship, Terriers grew a bit darker last week, and then really upped the ante on this installment."
