= Manifest Destiny (Terriers) =

- Terriers episode
- Episode no.: Season 1 Episode 5
- Directed by: Rian Johnson
- Written by: Leslye Headland
- Cinematography by: Curtis Wehr
- Editing by: Jordan Goldman
- Production code: 1WAD04
- Original air date: October 6, 2010
- Running time: 43 minutes

Guest appearances
- Michael Gaston as Ben Zeitlin; Karina Logue as Stephanie Dallworth; Loren Dean as Jason Adler; Christopher Cousins as Robert Lindus; Jackie Debatin as Josephine Lindus

Episode chronology
← Previous "Fustercluck"	Next → "Ring-a-Ding-Ding"

"Manifest Destiny" is the fifth episode of the American crime comedy-drama television series Terriers. The episode was written by Leslye Headland, and directed by Rian Johnson. It was first broadcast on FX in the United States on October 6, 2010.

The series is set in Ocean Beach, San Diego and focuses on ex-cop and recovering alcoholic Hank Dolworth (Donal Logue) and his best friend, former criminal Britt Pollack (Michael Raymond-James), who both decide to open an unlicensed private investigation business. In the episode, Hank and Britt try to get rid of the problem with Lindus' corpse, while also investigating a law firm that seems to be involved with him.

According to Nielsen Media Research, the episode was seen by an estimated 0.486 million household viewers and gained a 0.2/1 ratings share among adults aged 18–49. The episode received extremely positive reviews from critics, who praised the resolution to some of the story arcs, performances and directing.

== Plot ==
Lindus (Christopher Cousins) is reported missing by his wife Josephine (Jackie Debatin), who accuses Hank (Donal Logue) and Britt (Michael Raymond-James) of having kidnapped him. Mark (Rockmond Dunbar) questions Hank, who suggests he may have accessed Lindus' office for him.

Returning home, they find that Steph (Karina Logue) has placed Lindus' corpse in a bathtub with ice. Britt retrieves one of Lindus' cars from his mansion use the body to stage Lindus' death to appear like a drunk driving crash. The next day, they visit Josephine and claim that retrieving Lindus from the airfield was part of their plan with Lindus. Josephine informs them that Lindus' associates wanted to meet with him and she provided them with Hank's and Britt's information. Hank takes Steph to live with Gretchen (Kimberly Quinn) while Britt moves out of his house with Katie (Laura Allen).

To draw out his associates, Hank and Britt use Lindus' frozen credit card to make it appear like he stayed in a motel room. Later, a man (Daren Scott) whom Hank identifies as Mickey’s killer visits the motel and leaves. They follow him to a law firm, Zeitlin & Associates. As Hank follows the man, he is greeted by Ben Zeitlin (Michael Gaston), who offers to represent him and Britt on the kidnapping accusation. After Hank brings up Mickey’s death and suspicious activity at the resort construction site, Zeitlin asks for the environmental study that Lindus possessed, threatening him and Britt by showing that the suspicious man, Mr. Burke, has been following them and their loved ones for days. On his way out, Hank punches Mr. Burke in the nose.

Hank and Britt visit Maggie (Jamie Denbo), who has just given birth to her son. Learning that Zeitlin is involved, she tells them to give them everything they want and then leave. To complicate matters, Gretchen and Jason (Loren Dean) have checked the soil report, which reveals massive amounts of carcinogens at the construction site. Concerned for their safety, Hank and Britt locate Lindus' wrecked car and place the soil study in Lindus' jacket. They report the crashed car so the police discover the body and the study.

As Hank and Britt watch the news coverage on a bar, they are joined by Mark, who knows they called in the car and wonders if they had a role in Lindus' death, which the pair denies. Mark thanks them for whatever they did. The next day, Zeitlin is forced to give a conference to condemn Lindus and the soil study, which halts the development. Hank thanks Jason and Gretchen for helping him with Steph. As they leave, Hank tells Gretchen that he still loves her. While driving home, Steph casually mentions the soil study had fake readings that were incompatible with one another, merely giving the impression the development was carcinogenic. A shocked Hank drives to the construction site, where he sees Mr. Burke supervising workers on the project. As Steph asks if the case remains open, Hank doubtfully says that it is closed.

== Reception ==
=== Viewers ===
The episode was watched by 0.486 million viewers, earning a 0.2/1 in the 18-49 rating demographics on the Nielson ratings scale. This means that 0.2 percent of all households with televisions watched the episode, while 1 percent of all households watching television at that time watched it. This was a 26% decrease in viewership from the previous episode, which was watched by 0.649 million viewers with a 0.3/1 in the 18-49 rating demographics.

=== Critical reviews ===
"Manifest Destiny" received extremely positive reviews from critics. Noel Murray of The A.V. Club gave the episode a "B+" grade and wrote, "Waiting to see how Hank would get pulled back in added a layer of tension to an episode that was a fraction less grabby than the previous four Terriers. 'Manifest Destiny' was every bit as clever and funny as what we've seen so far — with a little stylistic flourish provided by director Rian Johnson — but with no new case for our heroes to investigate, there was more of a businesslike feel to the episode. Dice to roll. Cards to play. Pieces to move."

Alan Sepinwall of HitFix wrote, "'Manifest Destiny' wraps up the Lindus/Montague story arc for now, but in a way that makes it clear Britt and Hank will be wading through this particular septic tank again before the season's end. The hour, written by Lesley Headland and directed by Rian Johnson, kept up the chaotic feeling of the closing minutes of last week's episode."

Matt Richenthal of TV Fanatic gave the episode a 4.2 star rating out of 5 and wrote, "I sincerely have no idea what will happen next with this storyline, which is always a great feeling to have when watching any show. But it's an especially great feeling to have for a show that started out as a simple look at the lives of two close friends, and has evolved into an intricate world of murder, cover-ups and so much more." Cory Barker of TV Overmind wrote, "In 'Manifest Destiny', they have to deal with the consequences of that decision while the whole world starts to suck in around them. That element is probably one of my favorite parts of Terriers."
