= Asunder (Terriers) =

- Terriers episode
- Episode no.: Season 1 Episode 10
- Directed by: Ted Griffin
- Written by: Nicholas Griffin
- Cinematography by: Curtis Wehr
- Editing by: Kimberly Ray
- Production code: 1WAD09
- Original air date: November 10, 2010
- Running time: 41 minutes

Guest appearances
- Michael Gaston as Ben Zeitlin; Alison Elliott as Laura Ross; Loren Dean as Jason Adler; Paul Hipp as Barry

Episode chronology
← Previous "Pimp Daddy"	Next → "Sins of the Past"

"Asunder" is the tenth episode of the American crime comedy-drama television series Terriers. The episode was written by Nicholas Griffin, and directed by series creator Ted Griffin. It was first broadcast on FX in the United States on November 10, 2010.

The series is set in Ocean Beach, San Diego and focuses on ex-cop and recovering alcoholic Hank Dolworth (Donal Logue) and his best friend, former criminal Britt Pollack (Michael Raymond-James), who both decide to open an unlicensed private investigation business. In the episode, Hank and Britt attend Gretchen's wedding but both face personal problems while staying at the hotel.

According to Nielsen Media Research, the episode was seen by an estimated 0.539 million household viewers and gained a 0.2/1 ratings share among adults aged 18–49. The episode received critical acclaim, with critics praising the performances, writing, and directing.

== Plot ==
Hank (Donal Logue) busies himself with household chores and an Alcoholics Anonymous meeting on the day of Gretchen (Kimberly Quinn) and Jason’s (Loren Dean) wedding. Britt (Michael Raymond-James) and Katie (Laura Allen) attend, and Hank brings Britt a replacement shirt after his is ruined by another guest.

Unbeknownst to Britt, Hank visits the hotel bar. Nearly breaking his sobriety, he instead sees Ben Zeitlin (Michael Gaston) and Mr. Burke (Daren Scott), overhearing them discuss an imminent meeting. Hank tells Britt he is investigating Zeitlin and brings in Britt’s tech friends to help him spy on it. Planting a camera in their suite, Hank watches Zeitlin meet freelance reporter Laura Ross (Alison Elliot), who has reported about Zeitlin’s suspicious land acquisitions and business dealings. He demands the identity of her confidential source, which she refuses to disclose, so Burke threatens to kill her mother if she does not comply.

At the wedding reception, Britt asks Katie if she’s pregnant, but she lies and claims that she isn't, feeling disappointed when Britt expresses relief. Britt confronts Katie again for lying after she suffers from a bout of nausea. She whispers something into his ear, prompting him to leave the reception in anger. Katie follows, admitting to sleeping with someone but withholding the name of the man. Katie uses Britt’s remarks to suggest that he is not ready for marriage. Britt breaks off their relationship, telling her that he will move out.

Hank manages to communicate with Ross, getting her mother's address to warn her about the threat. He also calls security to take Ross out of the hotel room. Hank places Ross in the wedding limo, managing to avoid being seen by Gretchen and Jason. He then confronts Zeitlin, warning him to stay away from Ross or he will leak the recording of his threat. Zeitlin leaves, but Burke gets his payback by punching Hank. A reinvigorated Hank finds the despondent Britt and informs him of his encounter with Zeitlin.

== Reception ==
=== Viewers ===
The episode was watched by 0.539 million viewers, earning a 0.2/1 in the 18-49 rating demographics on the Nielson ratings scale. This means that 0.2 percent of all households with televisions watched the episode, while 1 percent of all households watching television at that time watched it. This was a 20% decrease in viewership from the previous episode, which was watched by 0.667 million viewers with a 0.3/1 in the 18-49 rating demographics.

=== Critical reviews ===
"Asunder" received critical acclaim. Noel Murray of The A.V. Club gave the episode an "A−" grade and wrote, "The personal and the professional collide like a sonofabitch in this week's Terriers, a somewhat unusual outing for the series but one of its strongest. For the third episode in a row, Hank and Britt are separated for most of the hour, though they at least they're in roughly the same location: a San Diego luxury hotel, where Hank's ex-wife, Gretchen, is getting married. And our heroes do end the episode back together, ready to forge ahead — Hank triumphantly, and Britt with his heart and guts dangling around his shoetops."

Alan Sepinwall of HitFix wrote, "For a show that so frequently operates on a very casual wavelength, the tension in this one was gripping, and the payoffs – particularly Britt and Hank's role reversal at the end – worth the amount of time I spent holding my breath." Matt Richenthal of TV Fanatic gave the episode a 4.7 star rating out of 5 and wrote, "Another tremendous episode of a show that gives us something different every week. Simply put, I'll be very sad if Terriers does not come back for a second season."
