= Change Partners (Terriers) =

- Terriers episode
- Episode no.: Season 1 Episode 3
- Directed by: Guy Ferland
- Written by: Phoef Sutton
- Cinematography by: Curtis Wehr
- Editing by: David Kaldor
- Production code: 1WAD02
- Original air date: September 22, 2010
- Running time: 45 minutes

Guest appearances
- Olivia Williams as Miriam Foster; Shawn Doyle as Armand Foster; Loren Dean as Jason Adler; Maximiliano Hernández as Ray

Episode chronology
← Previous "Dog and Pony"	Next → "Fustercluck"

"Change Partners" is the third episode of the American crime comedy-drama television series Terriers. The episode was written by consulting producer Phoef Sutton, and directed by Guy Ferland. It was first broadcast on FX in the United States on September 22, 2010.

The series is set in Ocean Beach, San Diego and focuses on ex-cop and recovering alcoholic Hank Dolworth (Donal Logue) and his best friend, former criminal Britt Pollack (Michael Raymond-James), who both decide to open an unlicensed private investigation business. In the episode, Hank needs money to pay for his mortgage and accepts a case where a man accuses his wife of infidelity. Meanwhile, Britt is contacted by an old friend from his criminal past.

According to Nielsen Media Research, the episode was seen by an estimated 0.568 million household viewers and gained a 0.2/1 ratings share among adults aged 18–49. The episode received extremely positive reviews from critics, who praised the performances, character dynamics, and character development.

== Plot ==
In a suit store, Britt (Michael Raymond-James) bumps into a customer and steals his wallet. After bringing it to Hank (Donal Logue), who claims it is part of a job, Britt returns it to the man’s dressing room and sees Hank’s ex-wife Gretchen (Kimberly Quinn) — realizing that the man, Jason Adler (Loren Dean), is her fiancé.

Struggling to find a bank to approve a loan for his mortgage, Hank is approached by Armand Foster (Shawn Doyle), the head of the latest lending company he meets with. In exchange for loan approval, Foster asks for his help in following his wife Miriam (Olivia Williams), whom he suspects of having an affair. Meanwhile, Britt is robbed at a bar by a masked man who recognizes him. When Britt returns home to Katie (Laura Allen), he finds an old friend from his burglary days, Ray (Maximiliano Hernández), is visiting. Ray tries to convince Britt to help him with a robbery, but Britt declines the offer.

Hank follows Miriam but finds no evidence of infidelity. Armand is furious at his lack of progress and dismisses him, declining to help him. Hank convinces him to give him a few more days. With Britt's help, he follows Miriam to a plaza. Miriam recognizes him and attacks him with pepper spraybefore discovering that Armand sent him. She explains that Armand, who her psychiatry patient before she fell for him, is demanding she cheat on him as the humiliation excites him; so far, she has just lied to placate him. Ray stalks Katie, demanding that Britt work with him again. He also tells her that she doesn't know his full past.

In order to fool Armand, Hank suggests staging an affair. Hank, Britt, Miriam, and Katie meet in a motel room, where Miriam and Britt will pretend to be on an affair, supervised by Katie and photographed by Hank. With the "affair" investigated, Hank delivers the pictures to Armand. That night, Hank has an awkward dinner with Gretchen and Jason at his house. Jason asks for help investigating who has stolen his credit card information. After they leave, he is visited by Miriam, who informs him that Armand now wants to witness the affair himself. They then kiss and have sex. The next morning, Hank wakes to a handwritten note from her. Hank goes to the bar, where Britt shows up with a ski mask pretending to be Ray and rob it. Hank seizes his gun, prompting Britt-as-Ray to flee and Hank to deliver the gun with Ray’s fingerprints to the police.

When Hank meets with Armand to sign the mortgage papers, Armand reveals that he is aware of their ruse, having linked Britt and Hank together from recent press coverage of their work on the Lindus case. Armand refuses to help with the mortgage and gloats about making Miriam confess the faux affair, causing Hank to explain in detail his night with Miriam and show her note as proof. A humiliated Armand signs the papers and tells Hank to never see him again. Hank leaves but returns for a missing signature, discovering that Armand has committed suicide by jumping out the window. Hank finds his suicide note, which reads “I only meant to hurt myself.” Using Armand’s papers, he forges the missing signature and leaves his office.

Britt tells Katie that he and Ray worked together to rob houses, one of which was Katie's. Struck by her pictures, he eventually visited the bar where she worked to meet her. Initially acting mad, Katie forgives his past transgressions. Hank visits Miriam at her house and tells her she can't feel guilty for her husband's death. He admits that he met with Armand and told the truth of their night together, prompting her to leave him in silence. Hank returns home and plays his guitar. Unbeknownst to him, a person sneaks into his attic.

== Reception ==
=== Viewers ===
The episode was watched by 0.568 million viewers, earning a 0.2/1 in the 18-49 rating demographics on the Nielson ratings scale. This means that 0.2 percent of all households with televisions watched the episode, while 1 percent of all households watching television at that time watched it. This was a 31% decrease in viewership from the previous episode, which was watched by 0.822 million viewers with a 0.4/1 in the 18-49 rating demographics.

=== Critical reviews ===
"Change Partners" received extremely positive reviews from critics. Noel Murray of The A.V. Club gave the episode an "A−" grade and wrote, "Carrying the theme of change and recidivism even further, 'Change Partners' delivers a huge chunk of the Britt and Hank origin story (something that, after last week's tease, I'd assumed would be trickling out over the rest of the season)."

Alan Sepinwall of HitFix wrote, "Just a fantastic episode, and I'm hopeful the show's creative bonafides will convince FX to consider a second season in spite of some very bad ratings thus far."

Matt Richenthal of TV Fanatic gave the episode a 4.7 star rating out of 5 and wrote, "Easily my favorite episode so far, 'Change Partners' gave us new insight into both these men and none of it felt forced. The connection between Hank and Britt feels real, so does the latter's relationship to Katie (who used to hook... just kidding!) and I can't wait to see in which direction the show goes next." Cory Barker of TV Overmind wrote, "'Change Partners' is not only an informative episode because of its revelations about Britt's past or how dirty Hank can get, but also a highly intense story that starts off goofy but quickly turns bleak. And it is definitely the best of the three aired episodes of Terriers thus far."
