= Agua Caliente (Terriers) =

- Terriers episode
- Episode no.: Season 1 Episode 8
- Directed by: John Dahl
- Written by: Phoef Sutton; Jon Worley
- Cinematography by: Curtis Wehr
- Editing by: Jordan Goldman
- Production code: 1WAD07
- Original air date: October 27, 2010
- Running time: 41 minutes

Guest appearances
- Maximiliano Hernández as Ray; Keith Szarabajka as Agent Samuel Weisdorf; Jose Pablo Cantillo as Felipe Prado; Johnny Sneed as Professor Owen; Manuel E. Urrego as Javier de la Rosa; Rene Fernandez as Rico

Episode chronology
← Previous "Missing Persons"	Next → "Pimp Daddy"

"Agua Caliente" is the eighth episode of the American crime comedy-drama television series Terriers. The episode was written by Phoef Sutton and Jon Worley, and directed by John Dahl. It was first broadcast on FX in the United States on October 27, 2010.

The series is set in Ocean Beach, San Diego and focuses on ex-cop and recovering alcoholic Hank Dolworth (Donal Logue) and his best friend, former criminal Britt Pollack (Michael Raymond-James), who both decide to open an unlicensed private investigation business. In the episode, Britt is kidnapped by the cartel and forced to help them in recovering a drug package, or Katie will die.

According to Nielsen Media Research, the episode was seen by an estimated 0.465 million household viewers and gained a 0.2/1 ratings share among adults aged 18–49. The episode received extremely positive reviews from critics, who praised the writing, tension, performances and character development.

== Plot ==
Hank (Donal Logue) and Britt (Michael Raymond-James) visit a golf course to serve legal papers to a member. The member tries to evade them, but Hank catches him. As he leaves, he discovers that Britt is missing, his cellphone left behind.

With Maggie (Jamie Denbo) and Katie (Laura Allen) unaware of his location, Hank asks Mark (Rockmond Dunbar) for help. They return to the golf course and view CCTV footage showing Britt abducted by men in a car bearing license plates from Baja California, suggesting that the cartel was involved. Mark contacts a friend, DEA Agent Samuel Weisdorf (Keith Szarabajka), who reviews the footage and recognizes the driver as Felipe Padro (Jose Pablo Cantillo), an enforcer for the cartel. Hank and Mark cross the border to find Britt.

Britt finds himself in Tijuana with Ray (Maximiliano Hernández), who has also been taken by the cartel. The cartel used Ray as a delivery man but he failed to deliver a drug shipment, which is now in police custody. Ray suggested that they should get Britt to steal it, explaining his kidnapping. Prado demands Britt get the packages back, threatening retaliation against Katie — who is still distracted by her tryst with her professor and unaware that one of Prado’s enforcers has followed her to her veterinary exam. Britt and Ray fight in a bar, leading to their arrest, which Hank and Mark of Britt's location.

In jail, Britt picks the lock on their cell, while Ray incapacitates a guard and steals their uniform. Britt finds the drug package and he and Ray narrowly escape the police station as Hank and Mark arrive. They return to Prado's hideout, only to discover that his boss Javier de la Rosa (Manuel E. Urrego) holding him at gunpoint for failing to deliver the package. After he kills Prado, Britt barters with de la Rosa, trading the drugs for Prado’s cellphone to call off the enforcer stalking Katie. Britt and Ray leave the hideout and are immediately chased by the police.

As they evade authorities, Britt uses the cellphone to contact Katie, but she leaves her cellphone behind after hastily exiting her exam. He and Hank meet in Tijuana; Hank hides Britt in the trunk of Mark’s car to cross the border, while Ray is apprehended. Britt fails to reach Katie, who is held captive at home by the enforcer. Professor Owen (Johnny Sneed) visits Katie to discuss their one night stand and is pistol whipped.

Hank, Britt, and Mark arrive at Katie’s apartment and find the enforcer’s car empty. The enforcer holds Katie hostage until he is hit by Hank, causing him to shoot Hank in the shoulder before he is killed by Mark. As Hank is taken by the ambulance, he warns Owen to stay away from Katie or he will ruin his personal and professional life.

== Reception ==
=== Viewers ===
The episode was watched by 0.465 million viewers, earning a 0.2/1 in the 18-49 rating demographics on the Nielson ratings scale. This means that 0.2 percent of all households with televisions watched the episode, while 1 percent of all households watching television at that time watched it. This was a slight increase in viewership from the previous episode, which was watched by 0.444 million viewers with a 0.2/1 in the 18-49 rating demographics.

=== Critical reviews ===
"Agua Caliente" received extremely positive reviews from critics. Noel Murray of The A.V. Club gave the episode an "A−" grade and wrote, "'Agua Caliente' has more of a unified storyline than the last couple of episodes, and though it's bound together by a strong theme, it's not as blunt about expressing it as 'Ring-A-Ding-Ding' or 'Missing Persons.' This episode was all about exploring the partnership of Hank and Britt, by pulling them apart."

Alan Sepinwall of HitFix wrote, "Terriers has been on such a roll for the last month-plus that it was inevitable there would be a let-down episode, and 'Agua Caliente' fit the bill. It wasn't a bad episode, but one that felt oddly slight, if such a description can apply to an episode in which Katie was in danger throughout, Britt and Hank spent a lot of time in the company of their former partners, Katie's adulterous professor got involved in a hostage situation with her and Hank got shot." Matt Richenthal of TV Fanatic gave the episode a 4.2 star rating out of 5 and wrote, "This is how a great show does a standalone episode. 'Agua Caliente' featured Britt getting snatched up by the Mexican cartel, reuniting briefly with his former partner and then returning to the States in time to help Mark and Hank save Katie's life. That plot on its own served up intrigue, suspense and a few funny lines. But Terriers has created a world in which everything is connected, as Ray was only south of the border because Britt set him up to get arrested a few episodes ago; while Katie's professor was only involved in her hostage situation because... you know. Shhh, don't tell Britt."
