= Lee Reherman =

American actor (1966–2016)

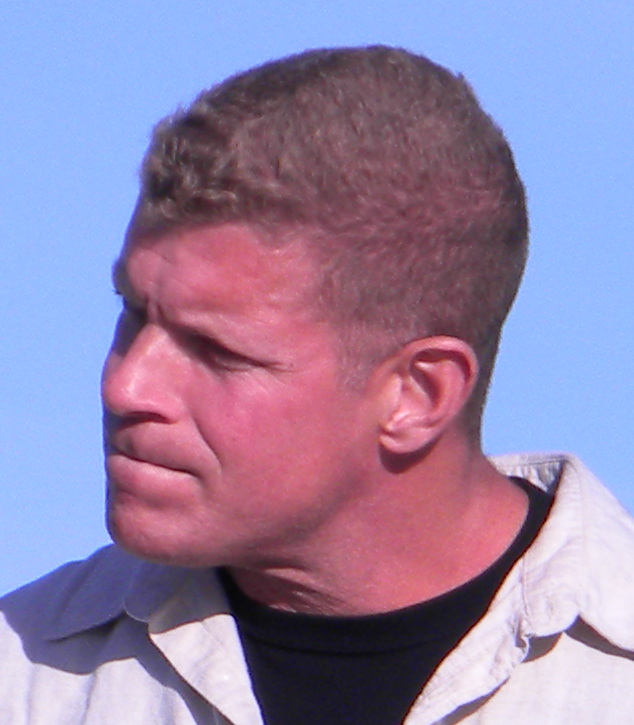
- Reherman in 2010
- Born: July 4, 1966; Louisville, Kentucky, U.S.
- Died: March 1, 2016 (aged 49); Manhattan Beach, California, U.S.
- Occupations: Actor, television host
- Years active: 1992–2016
- Partner: Natalina Maggio

Lee Reherman (July 4, 1966 – March 1, 2016) was an American actor, appearing in television and film and hosting television reality shows.

== Early life ==
Reherman was born on July 4, 1966, in Louisville, Kentucky. He attended Cornell University, where he played football as an offensive lineman.

Following his graduation with a B.S. in 1988, he attended the Miami Dolphins training camp trying out for the team's offensive line, but did not make the team.

Thereafter, he earned his MBA at the UCLA Anderson School of Management. He was pursuing a doctorate in economics at the University of California-Los Angeles (UCLA), although he left to begin his television and film career.

== Professional career ==
In 1992, Reherman made his first professional acting appearance as an unnamed football player in the television show Columbo. The following year, he had a small named part in the film Last Action Hero, but began creating a name when he joined the American Gladiators television show as "Hawk". He remained with the show until its cancelation in 1996, also appearing from 1995 to 1996 in the spin-offs International Gladiators 1 and International Gladiators 2. Through this time and after, he continued with small spots in television programs and television hosting roles, including a recurring position with the American Veterans Awards on the History Channel. Reherman reprised his "Hawk" nickname on RollerJam, serving as color commentator.

In 2007, Reherman became the regular host of Hot Rod TV and Forza Motorsport Showdown on the television network Speed. He hosted Forza Motorsport Showdown for one season. He also hosted the series Battle of the Supercars (2010) (Speed), Off-Road Overhaul (2011–2012) (Outdoor Channel), and Game Changers (2013) (Stage 5 TV).

In addition to one-offs and occasional appearances, Reherman had recurring acting roles on several television series, including Look: The Series (2010) and The First Family (2012–2013). He was also featured regularly on reality show The Great Escape (2012) as a guard.

Reherman also worked in video games, providing voices for characters in Dead Rising 3 and Ghost Recon Advanced Warfighter. The projects he was working when he died will go on as planned. In 2010, he appeared in a recurring role on the ABC soap opera General Hospital.

== Death ==
Reherman was found dead on March 1, 2016, by his girlfriend Natalina Maggio; she discovered Lee's body at his house in Manhattan Beach, California. No cause of death was specified. Reherman had undergone hip replacement surgery a few weeks earlier. He was survived by his father and two brothers.

== Filmography ==
=== Film ===
Year	Title	Role	Notes
1993	Last Action Hero	Krause	Comic fantasy-action film directed and produced by John McTiernan.
1996	Downhill Willie	Han Saxer	drama film directed by David Mitchell.
1997	Champions	Steele Manheim	Sports-drama film directed by Peter Gathings Bunche.
1998	Crossfire	Big Ed	Action-drama film directed and written by Gary S. Lipsky and Joe Zimmerman.
1998	Heaven & the Suicide King	Matt Rakowski	Thriller film directed and written by Todd A. Spoor (credited as Todd Spoor).
2004	Death and Texas	Sportscaster	Comedy film directed and written by Kevin DiNovis.
2005	Detective	Deputy	Crime drama film directed by David S. Cass Sr..
2007	Bratz	Vice Principal Sludge	Musical live-action comedy film based on the Bratz line of cartoon characters & dolls and directed by Sean McNamara.
2009	Not Easily Broken	Coach Spinello	Romantic comedy-drama film directed by Bill Duke.
2009	Race to Witch Mountain	Lieutenant Gunn	Science fiction/thriller film and a remake of the 1975 Disney film Escape to Witch Mountain.; Based on the 1968 novel of the same name by Alexander Key and directed by Andy Fickman.; Uncredited
2010	Father vs. Son	The Big Nasty	Comedy-romantic film directed and c-written by Joe Ballarini.
2011	Fred & Vinnie	Adam Clark	Comedy film directed by Steve Skrovan.
2011	Coming & Going	Danny	Comedy-romantic film directed and co-written by Edoardo Ponti.
2013	Holt & Randy: For Sale	Host	Short film
2013	Star Trek Into Darkness	Uniformed Mercenary	Science fiction-action film directed by J. J. Abrams.
2014	Holt Kills Randy	Unknown	Comedy film directed by Jason Heath and Russell Griffith (co-writer).
2017	Two Faced	Doctor	(final film role)

=== Television ===
Year	Title	Role	Notes
1992	Columbo	Football Player	Episode: "A Bird in the Hand"
1993–00	American Gladiators	Hawk	19 episodes
1995	Ellen	Hawk	Episode: "Gladiators"
1995	MADtv	Fist	Episode: "Episode #104"
1995–96	International Gladiators 1 International Gladiators 2	Hawk	Contract role
1996	Buddies	Busboy	Episode: "The PSA Story"
1997	Live! with Regis and Kathie Lee	Himself	Episode: "May 30, 1997"
1998	Hard Time	Motorcycle Cop	Made-for-TV-Movie directed by and starring Burt Reynolds.
1999	The Net	John Storm	Episode: "Last Man Standing"
1999	Caroline in the City	Sweeney Brother #1	Episode: "Caroline and the Ancestral Home"
1999	BattleBots	Host	Live event broadcast on ZDTV
1999	Soldier of Fortune, Inc.	Mark	Episode: "Welcome to Bent Cooper"; Also known as Special Ops Force
1999–01	RollerJam	Host	Contract role
2001	XFL	Sideline Reporter	Contract role
2001	The X-Files	Yuri Volkof	Episode: "Vienen"
2001	Angel	The Captain	Episode: "There's No Place Like Pirtz Glrb"
2001	Gilmore Girls	The Doorman	Episode: "Red Light on the Wedding Night"
2001	Cannonball Run 2001	Host	Contract role
2002	The X-Files	Yuri Volkof	2 episodes
2003	The Shield	Ludvig	Episode: "Dead Soldiers"
2003	NCIS	Sgt. Tuers	Episode: "Hung Out to Dry"
2003–05	Arena	Host	Contract role
2004	Eve	Turbo	Episode: "Party All the Time"
2004	That's So Raven	Carl	Episode: "Spa Day Afternoon"
2005	The Suite Life of Zack & Cody	Amputator the Celebrity Wrestler	Episode: "Maddie Checks In"
2005	Malcolm in the Middle		Episode: "Mrs. Tri-County"; Uncredited
2006	Charmed	Soldier	Episode: "Payback's a Witch"
2006	The Chelsea Handler Show	Midget Wars Host	Episode: "Episode #1.6"
2007–13	Hot Rod TV	Host	Contract role
2007	In Case of Emergency	Frank	Episode: "Pilot"
2007	The Closer	Deputy Slad	Episode: "Manhunt"
2007	Final Approach	Armed Terrorist Tucker	Action-Thriller Made-for-TV-Movie directed by Armand Mastroianni.
2007	Sharpshooter	Ziggy	Made-for-TV-Movie directed by Armand Mastroianni.
2008	Cory in the House	Slade	Episode: "Model Behavior"
2008	Leverage	Grady	Episode: "The Homecoming Job"
2009	Star-ving	Officer Reherman	4 episodes
2009	Wizards of Waverly Place	Doug Normous	Episode: "Hugh's Not Normous"
2009	Prison Break	Deckard	Episode: "VS."
2010	Hannah Montana	Chet	Episode: "Got to Get Her Out of My House"
2010	General Hospital	Frank	5 episodes
2010	Terriers	Randy Oaks	Episode: "Pilot"
2010	90210	Coach Laketa	Episode: "2021 Vision"
2010	Terriers	Randy Oaks	Episode: "Quid Pro Quo"
2010	Look: The Series	Officer Munson	11 episodes
2011	Medium	Jason Bumgarner	Episode: "Only Half Lucky"
2011	Regular Show	The Fire Marshall, Forearmageddon (voice)	Episode: "Really Real Wrestling"
2011	Workaholics	Chuck	Episode: "Muscle I'd Like to Flex"
2011	Chuck	Simms	Episode: "Chuck Versus the Curse"
2012	Blackout	Cooper	3 episodes
2012	The Great Escape	Guard	Episode: "Escape From Alcatraz"
2012–2015	The First Family	Special Agent Ross Hardison	29 episodes
2013	Mr. Box Office	Special Agent Ross Hardison	Episode: "Mr. Jackson Goes to Washington"
2014	Sam & Cat	Mark Bonner	Episode: "#BlueDogSoda"
2014	Mighty Mia	Skwar	Action-comedy Made-for-TV-Movie directed and co-written by Gev Miron.
2015–2016	K.C. Undercover	Victor	3 episodes
2016	Jane the Virgin	Lee	Episode: "Chapter Thirty-One"
2016	Cooper Barrett's Guide to Surviving Life	Kyle	Episode: "How to Survive Losing Your Phone"

=== Video games ===
Year	Title	Role	Notes
2005	Tom Clancy's Ghost Recon Advanced Warfighter	Voice	Directed by Keith Are and David Jankowski.
2013	Dead Rising 3	Voice	Directed by Tom Keegan and George Samilski.
