= Quid Pro Quo (Terriers) =

- Terriers episode
- Episode no.: Season 1 Episode 12
- Directed by: Adam Arkin
- Written by: Angela Kang; Leslye Headland
- Cinematography by: Curtis Wehr
- Editing by: David Kaldor
- Production code: 1WAD11
- Original air date: November 24, 2010
- Running time: 42 minutes

Guest appearances
- Michael Gaston as Ben Zeitlin; Loren Dean as Jason Adler; Scott Klace as Councilman Sam Albrecht; Elizabeth Chomko as Ashley Barrett; Alison Elliott as Laura Ross

Episode chronology
← Previous "Sins of the Past"	Next → "Hail Mary"

"Quid Pro Quo" is the twelfth episode of the American crime comedy-drama television series Terriers. The episode was written by Angela Kang and Leslye Headland, and directed by Adam Arkin. It was first broadcast on FX in the United States on November 24, 2010.

The series is set in Ocean Beach, San Diego and focuses on ex-cop and recovering alcoholic Hank Dolworth (Donal Logue) and his best friend, former criminal Britt Pollack (Michael Raymond-James), who both decide to open an unlicensed private investigation business. In the episode, Hank, Britt and Laura continue working on their case against Zeitlin, which leads to unravelling a bigger conspiracy.

According to Nielsen Media Research, the episode was seen by an estimated 0.542 million household viewers and gained a 0.2/1 ratings share among adults aged 18–49. The episode received critical acclaim, with critics praising the writing, twists, directing, performances and set-up for the next episode.

== Plot ==
Hank (Donal Logue) and Laura (Alison Elliott) are investigating Zeitlin (Michael Gaston), who is the link between two major land buyers — the Montague Group purchasing land on Ocean Beach’s waterfront, including the property made to look contaminated, and a group called Terra Nuestra purchasing dilapidated properties in Ocean Beach’s center via eminent domain. Hank follows Laura as she travels to meet her confidential source, and she tells Hank that his ex-wife’s new husband Jason Adler (Loren Dean) is architect on one of the projects in between the land holdings.

Zeitlin visits Britt (Michael Raymond-James) in jail, pretending to be his lawyer and paying his bail. He leaves just as Hank and Laura arrive, confirming to them that Zeitlin wants the recording Hank claims to have of him threatening Laura. They meet with Maggie (Jamie Denbo), tells them Britt could face up to three years in prison for assault and battery. She directs them towards one of her clients, councilman Sam Albrecht (Scott Klace), who has his own misgivings about Zeitlin. Britt meets with Zeitlin and affirms the recording was a bluff. Zeitlin offers his legal help if he investigates a possible source in his office.

Hank and Laura meet with Jason, who tells them that his mixed-use eco-development project is under heavy pressure to be completed on time, while he feels watched by Zeitlin’s right-hand man Burke. After noting that he was asked to set up anenometers around the property and a blueprint indicating it is part of a larger map, the three find plans for the Ocean Beach land holdings to be razed to make way for a massive airport. Hank and Laura bring their findings to Albrecht.

Britt engineers an introduction with Ashley Barrett (Elizabeth Chomko), a corporate lawyer and possible source, and they become intimate on their date. When he tries to warn her, she realizes that Zeitlin sent him and kicks Britt out. Meanwhile, Katie (Laura Allen) tends to Gavin (Zack Silva), who tells her that Britt is responsible and facing prison time. After Laura discovers that her source’s meeting place has been compromised, Hank and Britt rush to the location but are redirected to a liquor store by Laura. They arrive to find Jason and Laura’s source dead and Laura missing. Hank and Britt meet with Albrecht and learn he is now working with Zeitlin. Hank consoles a devastated Gretchen (Kimberly Quinn) just notified of Jason's death and promises to learn the truth. Hank visits a local fence, using Lindus' bearer bonds to buy weapons.

== Reception ==
=== Viewers ===
The episode was watched by 0.542 million viewers, earning a 0.2/1 in the 18-49 rating demographics on the Nielson ratings scale. This means that 0.2 percent of all households with televisions watched the episode, while 1 percent of all households watching television at that time watched it. This was a 26% decrease in viewership from the previous episode, which was watched by 0.725 million viewers with a 0.4/1 in the 18-49 rating demographics.

=== Critical reviews ===
"Quid Pro Quo" received critical acclaim. Noel Murray of The A.V. Club gave the episode an "A" grade and wrote, "That's the kind of touch to character and plot that I look for from Terriers — ironic in an old-school way, not a bludgeoning, symbolic one. 'Quid Pro Quo' is full of those little moments that make we who've invested so much in these characters either smile or shudder (or both)."

Alan Sepinwall of HitFix wrote, "'Quid Pro Quo' is a mess, but in a very good way. It features a complicated Chinatown-style land grab storyline, leans heavily on things we've learned throughout the season, features Hank's plan going off the rails 16 different ways, and has Britt seeming to change allegiances every five seconds. By many reasonable standards, it shouldn't work. But it does." Cory Barker of TV Overmind wrote, "Wow. I was not expecting that at all. You know a show is great when it can shock you the way this week's episode of Terriers did. This is, hands down, the most underappreciated show on television this fall."
