= Missing Persons (Terriers) =

- Terriers episode
- Episode no.: Season 1 Episode 7
- Directed by: Michael Zinberg
- Written by: Jed Seidel
- Cinematography by: Curtis Wehr
- Editing by: Kimberly Ray
- Production code: 1WAD06
- Original air date: October 20, 2010
- Running time: 42 minutes

Guest appearances
- Noel Fisher as Amnesiac; Karina Logue as Stephanie Dolworth; Richmond Arquette as Doc Johnson; Jerrika Hinton as Didi

Episode chronology
← Previous "Ring-a-Ding-Ding"	Next → "Agua Caliente"

"Missing Persons" is the seventh episode of the American crime comedy-drama television series Terriers. The episode was written by Jed Seidel, and directed by Michael Zinberg. It was first broadcast on FX in the United States on October 20, 2010.

The series is set in Ocean Beach, San Diego and focuses on ex-cop and recovering alcoholic Hank Dolworth (Donal Logue) and his best friend, former criminal Britt Pollack (Michael Raymond-James), who both decide to open an unlicensed private investigation business. In the episode, Hank and Britt try to find more about an amnesiac, which also unleashes a chain of events. Meanwhile, Steph's condition worsens.

According to Nielsen Media Research, the episode was seen by an estimated 0.444 million household viewers and gained a 0.2/1 ratings share among adults aged 18–49. The episode received extremely positive reviews from critics, who praised the character development and the performances.

== Plot ==
Hank (Donal Logue) starts spending more time with Steph (Karina Logue) and notices her constantly mentioning their mother. He and Britt (Michael Raymond-James) arrive at their usual diner and assist an amnesiac man (Noel Fisher) locked in the restroom. While Britt suggests just leaving the man alone, Hank wants to help, finding similarities between him and Steph.

Finding a strange pill among his few belongings, they take him to meet with a former doctor, Johnson (Richmond Arquette), who explains that the pill is an anti-malarial that can cause memory loss, paranoia, and delusions among its side effects. The pair take the amnesiac to the police station, but he flees after taking a bulletin for a missing college student, Jessica Sampson. Mark also discloses that the anti-malarial can be used as rohypnol. Struggling to communicate with a distant Katie (Laura Allen), who refuses to talk about what is bothering her, leaves him uninterested in pursuing the case. Meanwhile, Steph leaves the house and befriends some of the neighbors, including a girl named Elle.

Hank and Britt visit Jessica’s apartment, learning from her roommate that Jessica was planning a trip to Cambodia before her disappearance. Using their hacker contacts, they discover Sampson missed her flight along with a man named Adam Fisher, who bought the plane tickets. They visit Adam's house, finding Jessica (Olivia Dawn York) bound and gagged in a closet. Learning from Jessica that she and Adam were classmates, Hank deduces that Adam harbored a crush on Jessica and the anti-malarial likely caused the paranoia that made him kidnap her; he urges Mark to treat Adam with compassion. Steph has a breakdown when she discovers that her encounters with Elle were just hallucinations.

Adam returns to Jessica’s apartment and holds her roommate at gunpoint, causing Mark to call Hank for assistance. Hank enters and quickly finds the gun is a fake. He confronts Adam and angrily demand that he accept help. Britt returns home to a still-distant Katie. Hank takes Steph to Country Villa Pines, a local psychiatric hospital, and pays with some of Lindus' bearer bonds. He agrees to constantly visit her, in contrast to her previous hospital stays.

== Reception ==
=== Viewers ===
The episode was watched by 0.444 million viewers, earning a 0.2/1 in the 18-49 rating demographics on the Nielson ratings scale. This means that 0.2 percent of all households with televisions watched the episode, while 1 percent of all households watching television at that time watched it. This was a 13% decrease in viewership from the previous episode, which was watched by 0.506 million viewers with a 0.2/1 in the 18-49 rating demographics.

=== Critical reviews ===
"Missing Persons" received extremely positive reviews from critics. Noel Murray of The A.V. Club gave the episode a "B+" grade and wrote, "As with last week's Terriers, I have a few quibbles with 'Missing Persons'. I was excited about the case-of-the-week when it started — especially since we were back to one of those cases that Hank and Britt just stumble into — but it didn't have as many unexpected twists and clever legwork as past Terriers cases, and while I appreciate that it tied thematically to our overarching character-plots, to me the ties were too close. Having a client's problems so fully encapsulate the problems that Hank and Steph are going through just seems way too neat for my taste."

Alan Sepinwall of HitFix wrote, "The amnesia case is a pretty standard private eye trope, going back to the '30s and '40s, and as with the adultery case from episode three, the Terriers writers did a good job of dressing up the old girl for the 21st century. As with most things about this show, it started off low-key, even funny at times, and then went darker and darker as the hour moved along."

Matt Richenthal of TV Fanatic gave the episode a 4.7 star rating out of 5 and wrote, "Indeed, Hank is a troubled man, but watching him sort through his messes every week is a pleasure. This was yet another example of how well Terriers balances the dark with the light, the action with the emotion." Cory Barker of TV Overmind wrote, "For the second straight week, Terriers dips into the standalone pool with a story that intensely mirrors the lives of the lead characters. While last week's case mirrored Britt and Katie's relationship,'Missing Persons' focuses on Hank and Steph, to almost the same amount of effectiveness. There is some risk in continuing to go down that road, but thus far, Terriers has nailed it, particularly because of the performances from the actors."
