= Dog and pony show (disambiguation) =

A dog and pony show is a highly promoted performance or event designed to sway opinion.

Dog and pony show may also refer to:

- "A Dog and Pony Show" (Homicide: Life on the Street), a first-season episode of Homicide: Life on the Street
- "The Dog and Pony Show" (1977), a fourth-season episode of The Rockford Files
- "The Dog and Pony Show" (1997), a third-season episode of The Drew Carey Show
- A Dog and Pony Show (My Little Pony: Friendship Is Magic), an episode of My Little Pony: Friendship is Magic

== See also ==
- The Last Dog and Pony Show, the fourth solo album by Bob Mould
- Dog and Pony, an episode of the TV series Terriers
