= Channon Roe =

American actor

- Born: James Channon Roe; October 27, 1969 (age 56); Pasadena, California
- Occupation: Actor
- Years active: 1994–2015
- Spouse: Bianca Chiminello (m. 2009)
- Children: 1

James Channon Roe (born October 27, 1969) is an American former actor. He began his film and television career in the mid-1990s. He first appeared on TV series My So-Called Life as Logan in 1994. Roe began his acting career in independent films, including The Low Life and Junked.

== Early life ==
Roe was born in Pasadena, California, but raised in Corona del Mar before training as an actor at the Joanne Baron / D.W. Brown Acting Studio and then at the British Academy of Dramatic Arts.

== Career ==
Roe began his film and television career in the mid-1990s. He first appeared on TV series My So-Called Life as Billy in 1994 and his acting career in independent films including "The Low Life" and "Junked".

In 1996, Roe starred as the lead character "Cash", leader of the Gangrel Clan of vampires, in the cult television series Kindred: The Embraced. Bio-Dome and Soldier Boys soon followed in Person's Unknown, alongside Naomi Watts, Kelly Lynch, Joe Mantegna and directed by George Hickenlooper, and Academy Award-nominated Boogie Nights.

Channon Roe has appeared in over 35 television series to date, including recurring performances such as Dirt starring Courteney Cox as Jeff Stagliano, the Indie Director who impregnates a very disturbed Shannyn Sossamon, and Windfall as Jeremy. Roe has also appeared on The OC, 24, Prison Break, Bones, CSI: Miami, CSI: Crime Scene Investigation, The X-Files, Buffy the Vampire Slayer, Charmed, Going to California, Without a Trace, NYPD Blue, Diagnosis Murder, Touched by an Angel, The Pretender, Fugitive, Spawn and HeadCase.

In 2008, Roe completed filming on two new projects, a pilot for A&E Television alongside Henry Thomas and Behind Enemy Lines: Columbia.

Roe appeared as Riley Maker on the TNT crime drama series Murder in the First in 2015, then Roe retired from his acting career.

== Personal life ==
Roe is an avid surfer, and is highly involved with activist groups Green Peace, Heal the Bay, and Surfrider Foundation. Roe has been a vegetarian for over 20 years and drives a Mercedes 1983 Vegetable Oil Conversion by Love Craft. He married Australian actress Bianca Chiminello in 2009.

== Filmography ==
=== Film ===
Year	Title	Role	Notes
1995	The Low Life	Craig	
1995	Soldier Boyz	Brophy	
1996	Bio-Dome	Roach	
1996	Persons Unknown	Lewis	
1997	Stir	Cab Driver	
1997	Boogie Nights	Surfer	
1997	Kiss & Tell	Angry Guy	
1998	Girl	Kevin	
1998	Can't Hardly Wait	Jock #1	
1998	Dante's View	Steven	
1999	Junked	Jimmy	
1999	Full Blast	'Razor'	
2000	Psycho Beach Party	'Wedge' Riley	
2000	A Man Is Mostly Water	Testifier	
2000	Spin Cycle	Bobby Loco	
2002	Angels Don't Sleep Here	Detective Jay Stanton	
2002	Mi Amigo	Younger Bobby Ray	
2006	Rampage: The Hillside Strangler Murders	Dave	
2006	Beautiful Dreamer	Ray	
2009	Behind Enemy Lines: Colombia	Chief Petty Officer Kevin Derricks	
2009	The Harsh Life of Veronica Lambert	'Zippy'	
2011	The Hangover Part II	Stefan LeFrontier	Uncredited
2012	Chasing Mavericks	Bob Pearson	

=== Television ===
Year	Title	Role	Notes
1994	My So-Called Life	Billy	Episode: "Halloween"
1995	Sketch Artist II: Hands That See	Surfer #1	Television film
1995	The Courtyard	Mr. Pizza	Television film
1995	The Invaders	Detective Rudnik	2 episodes
1996	Touched by an Angel	Lucas Tremaine	Episode: "Random Acts"
1996	Buried Secrets	Johnny Toussard	Television film
1996	Marshal Law	'Skin'	Television film
1996	Kindred: The Embraced	'Cash'	8 episodes
1997	The X-Files	Derek Banks	Episode: "Kaddish"
1997	NYPD Blue	Jimmy Mosler	Episode: "Emission Impossible"
1997	Todd McFarlane's Spawn	Joey	—N/a
1998	Significant Others	Nick	2 episodes
1998	Brooklyn South	Remy	Episode: "Cinnamon Buns"
1998	Welcome to Paradox	Hemeac	Episode: "Hemeac"
1998	The Pretender	Pat Rush	Episode: "Parole"
1999	Buffy the Vampire Slayer	Jack O'Toole	Episode: "The Zeppo"
1999	Jack & Jill	Nolan	Episode: "Moving On"
1999	Diagnosis: Murder	Lucas	2 episodes
2000	The Fugitive	Adam Bennett	Episode: "Miles to Go"
2001	The Division	Steve	Episode: "What Sharp Teeth You Have"
2001	Going to California	Baggo	3 episodes
2002	Charmed	Cree	Episode: "The Eyes Have It"
2002	Fastlane	Tommy 'Tommy K'	Episode: "Get Your Mack on"
2002–2011	CSI: Miami	Keith Garwood / Brad Repkin	2 episodes
2003–2009	Without a Trace	Drew Anderson	2 episodes
2005	Deadwood	Dan 'Slippery Dan'	2 episodes
2005–2013	CSI: Crime Scene Investigation	Lenny 'Moondog' Vanders / Douglas Granger	3 episodes
2006	24	Cal	Episode: "Day 5: 1:00 p.m.-2:00 p.m."
2006	Windfall	Jeremy	12 episodes
2006	The O.C.	Ray	Episode: "The Avengers"
2007	Prison Break	Robber	Episode: "Chicago"
2007–2008	Dirt	Jeff Stagliano	4 episodes
2008	Bones	Danny Fitz	Episode: "The Man in the Mud"
2008	Under	Freddy	Television film
2008–2009	Head Case	Tard	4 episodes
2009	NCIS	Greg Lambro	Episode: "Caged"
2009	Castle	Kevin Henson	Episode: "A Chill Goes Through Her Veins"
2009	Cold Case	John 'The Doctor' Norwood '63	Episode: "November 22"
2009–2010	Dark Blue	Billy Cline	2 episodes
2010	Terriers	William	Episode: "Fustercluck"
2010	The Genesis Files	Terry	3 episodes
2010	Undercovers	Larry	3 episodes
2011	Justified	Cutter	Episode: "The I of the Storm"
2011	The Chicago Code	Scott Bradnick	Episode: "Black Sox"
2011	House	Emory	Episode: "Dead & Buried"
2011–2013	NCIS: Los Angeles	Ray	2 episodes
2012	Breakout Kings	Victor Mannon	3 episodes
2012	Vegas	Ted Ermin	Episode: "Money Plays"
2015	Murder in the First	Riley Maker	7 episodes
