= Ring-a-Ding-Ding =

Ring-a-Ding-Ding may refer to:

- Ring-a-Ding-Ding!, an album by Frank Sinatra
- "Ring-a-Ding-Ding" (Terriers), an episode of the TV series Terriers
