= Ring-a-Ding-Ding (Terriers) =

- Terriers episode
- Episode no.: Season 1 Episode 6
- Directed by: Billy Gierhart
- Written by: Angela Kang
- Cinematography by: Curtis Wehr
- Editing by: David Kaldor
- Production code: 1WAD05
- Original air date: October 13, 2010
- Running time: 43 minutes

Guest appearances
- Karina Logue as Stephanie Dolworth; Loren Dean as Jason Adler; Stacy Edwards as Beth; Johnny Sneed as Professor Owens; Chris Bruno as Dale; T Lopez as Paolo Alvarez; Billy Cowart as Weed Dealer

Episode chronology
← Previous "Manifest Destiny"	Next → "Missing Persons"

"Ring-a-Ding-Ding" is the sixth episode of the American crime comedy-drama television series Terriers. The episode was written by Angela Kang, and directed by Billy Gierhart. It was first broadcast on FX in the United States on October 13, 2010.

The series is set in Ocean Beach, San Diego and focuses on ex-cop and recovering alcoholic Hank Dolworth (Donal Logue) and his best friend, former criminal Britt Pollack (Michael Raymond-James), who both decide to open an unlicensed private investigation business. In the episode, Hank and Britt are hired by a marriage to find a missing ring, which was actually given away by the husband to his lover. Meanwhile, Katie goes on a night out with her vet school professor.

According to Nielsen Media Research, the episode was seen by an estimated 0.506 million household viewers and gained a 0.2/1 ratings share among adults aged 18–49. The episode received extremely positive reviews from critics, who praised the humor, character development and performances.

== Plot ==
Hank (Donal Logue), Britt (Michael Raymond-James), Katie (Laura Allen), and Steph (Karina Logue) attend Gretchen (Kimberly Quinn) and Jason’s (Loren Dean) engagement party. Jason recognizes Britt, while Britt confides in Hank that he intends to propose to Katie.

Maggie (Jamie Denbo) returns from her maternity leave and puts Hank and Britt in contact with married couple Beth (Stacy Edwards) and Dale Komack (Chris Bruno). Dying of terminal cancer, Beth requests that they track down a missing heirloom ring, which she hopes to leave for her son to someday use in his marriage proposal. Dale mentions that their maid’s brother may be responsible, but as the pair leaves, Dale reveals that he gave the ring to his lover, Paolo (T Lopez) — but Paolo broke off their relationship when Beth outlived her original prognosis and refuses to return the ring.

Hank and Britt visit Paolo's beauty parlor, claiming to be customers. Paolo deduces that Dale sent them when Hank asks about the ring and kicks them out, revealing that she sold the ring. They track it from a flea market vendor to a junkie to a medical marijuana grower, coming to realize that Beth actually bought it back and knows of her husband’s infidelity. Beth tells Hank and Britt that she wants to know the name of Dale’s lover to amend her will or start divorce proceedings, preventing Dale from draining their son’s inheritance. She also asks them to collect the ring, which is secretly worth a small fortune, from the hiding place in her house.

As Hank distracts Dale, Britt sneaks into the house and retrieves the ring from a Bible. He also discovers that Beth's wigs come from the same beauty parlor where Paolo works. Dale receives a call that Beth has left the hospital and that Hank and Britt were the last people to see her. They find her at the beauty parlor confronting Paolo, whose young daughter recognizes Dale as her father. Hank and Britt take a heartbroken Beth back to the hospital, where she soon dies. Meanwhile, Katie is pressured by her peers to attend a karaoke night at a local bar. After it, a drunk Katie is propositioned by a classmate, but her vet school professor intervenes, leading to them having sex. Realizing what she has done, she quickly leaves and evades Britt's questions when she returns home.

Jason talks with Hank, explaining that he knows that Britt took his wallet and that Hank is responsible for the suspicious credit card activity. Despite that, he is not mad at him, explaining that he still likes him but wants to reiterate that he and Gretchen are getting married, which Hank must deal with. The next day, Katie calls Hank to meet and informs him about sleeping with her professor, which she feels terrible about. Hank consoles her but tells her that she cannot tell Britt about it. Despite her cries, she agrees to not tell him.

== Reception ==
=== Viewers ===
The episode was watched by 0.506 million viewers, earning a 0.2/1 in the 18-49 rating demographics on the Nielson ratings scale. This means that 0.2 percent of all households with televisions watched the episode, while 1 percent of all households watching television at that time watched it. This was a 4% increase in viewership from the previous episode, which was watched by 0.486 million viewers with a 0.2/1 in the 18-49 rating demographics.

=== Critical reviews ===
"Ring-a-Ding-Ding" received extremely positive reviews from critics. Noel Murray of The A.V. Club gave the episode a "B+" grade and wrote, "What does this have to do with the conspiracy to commit soil-test fraud at The Montague? Nada. But as a story about how the legal obligations of marriage conflict with and complicate the romantic passions of the same, 'Ring-A-Ding-Ding' is on-point. Because while Hank and Britt are working this case together, separately each is having his own little relationship melodrama."

Alan Sepinwall of HitFix wrote, "Terriers has put the Lindus/Montague mess on pause for a while, but I actually found 'Ring-a-Ding-Ding' to be one of the strongest episodes yet. The writers keep pushing the character arcs along even as Hank and Britt work a standalone case, and the more we get to know these people, the more we care about them – and the more it hurts when something happens like Katie's slip after karaoke night."

Matt Richenthal of TV Fanatic gave the episode a perfect 5-star rating out of 5 and wrote, "In just a handful of weeks, Terriers has introduced us to layered characters and a tone unlike anything else on TV. It can oscillate between comedic and dramatic from commercial break to commercial break, feeling entirely organic as it goes on." Cory Barker of TV Overmind wrote, "With Mad Men and Rubicon leaving the air this Sunday, it looks as though Terriers gets the 'Best Series on TV' belt. And I'm not sure anything airing now or coming on in the next few months can take it away."
