= Dog and Pony =

- Terriers episode
- Episode no.: Season 1 Episode 2
- Directed by: Clark Johnson
- Written by: Shawn Ryan; Jed Seidel
- Cinematography by: Curtis Wehr
- Editing by: Jordan Goldman
- Production code: 1WAD01
- Original air date: September 15, 2010
- Running time: 44 minutes

Guest appearances
- Paul Hipp as Barry; Nate Mooney as Bradley Denham; Matthew Willig as Montell Gobright; Mirelly Taylor as Lauren Rivera; Jean Villepique as Aggatha Hagglethorpe

Episode chronology
← Previous "Pilot"	Next → "Change Partners"

"Dog and Pony" is the second episode of the American crime comedy-drama television series Terriers. The episode was written by executive producer Shawn Ryan and consulting producer Jed Seidel, and directed by Clark Johnson. It was first broadcast on FX in the United States on September 15, 2010.

The series is set in Ocean Beach, San Diego and focuses on ex-cop and recovering alcoholic Hank Dolworth (Donal Logue) and his best friend, former criminal Britt Pollack (Michael Raymond-James), who both decide to open an unlicensed private investigation business. In the episode, Hank and Britt are forced to pursue a wanted criminal as their money has been taken by the authorities. However, the case proves to be even more complex than expected.

According to Nielsen Media Research, the episode was seen by an estimated 0.822 million household viewers and gained a 0.4/1 ratings share among adults aged 18–49. The episode received extremely positive reviews from critics, who praised the writing, character development, directing, and performances.

== Plot ==
Hank (Donal Logue) and Britt (Michael Raymond-James) are separately interviewed by the authorities regarding Lindus' arrest. They both deny any involvement in incriminating him or his arrest. Hank learns that the $30,000 check from Lindus can't be cashed, as it is evidence and Lindus' accounts are frozen, after which Mark (Rockmond Dunbar) upbraids them for their actions.

Needing money, they settle on catching a wanted criminal: Montell Gobright (Matthew Willig), wanted for armed robbery with a reward of $5,000. In order to lure him out, they intimidate his girlfriend, a fortune teller named Aggatha Hagglethorpe (Jean Villepique), into believing she must pay into a protection racket. He also visits Gretchen (Kimberly Quinn) to confirm that he will buy their old house, despite his Alcoholics Anonymous friend Barry (Paul Hipp) telling him it would be a mistake.

Hank and Britt return to see Aggatha and are confronted by Montell who is much larger than his wanted notice description. He brutally attacks the pair, throwing Britt out a window before fleeing. Hank and Britt are arrested and bailed out by Mark, who warns them to stay away from the case. Despite this, they question Bradley Denham (Nate Mooney), Montell's half-brother and a bookkeeper for a horse racing track that was mysteriously robbed recently. After hijacking a police tap of Denham’s phone, the pair intercept a meeting between the brothers, where Denham shoots Montell and flees.

Hank and Britt take the wounded Montell to Britt's house, asking his girlfriend and veterinary student Katie (Laura Allen) to treat him. Montell reveals that he and Denham pulled off the track heist but Denham never gave him his share. Hank and Britt visit the race track and blackmail Denham into giving them half of the money in exchange for killing Montell. Denham agrees but Mark suddenly appears, revealing that they were wearing a wire, and Denham is arrested. The heist money is found in Denham’s yard and Hank and Britt are given the reward money for the heist.

Hank, Britt, and Katie take Montell to meet Aggatha. They give the couple a dog Katie and Britt had adopted and quickly realized wasn’t right for them. Britt and Katie instead take in Winston, the bulldog he had previously rescued. With the reward money, Hank pays Gretchen for the old house. After she leaves, he uses a sledgehammer on a wall in the house, beginning to fulfill a promise he had made to Gretchen when they first moved into the house.

== Reception ==
=== Viewers ===
The episode was watched by 0.822 million viewers, earning a 0.4/1 in the 18-49 rating demographics on the Nielson ratings scale. This means that 0.4 percent of all households with televisions watched the episode, while 1 percent of all households watching television at that time watched it. This was a 49% decrease in viewership from the previous episode, which was watched by 1.61 million viewers with a 0.5/2 in the 18-49 rating demographics.

=== Critical reviews ===
"Dog and Pony" received extremely positive reviews from critics. Noel Murray of The A.V. Club gave the episode an "A−" grade and wrote, "Beyond the opening scene and a few stray mentions, 'Dog And Pony' doesn't move the Lindus storyline forward much. The episode is designed more to flesh out the world of Terriers, and to that end, the most significant scene in 'Dog And Pony' comes late, when Gustafson pulls Britt aside after the whole adventure is done in order to have a little chat about Hank."

Alan Sepinwall of HitFix wrote, "Regardless of where the Lindus story is going, we need to care about these two guys, and Hank's decision to smash down the hated wall – too late to save his marriage, but just in time to take away his option to back out of the purchase – was a moment where the stakes were as high for him as when he threatened to take down Lindus in the pilot."

Matt Richenthal of TV Fanatic gave the episode a 4.4 star rating out of 5 and wrote, "Episodes such as 'Dog and Pony' give us insight into their pasts, their relationships, their personalities and more. From there, the show can build more interesting cases around a pair of well-established individuals. I'm very much on board." Cory Barker of TV Overmind wrote, "After a fantastic pilot episode, 'Dog and Pony' proves that Terriers is going to be a must-watch new series this fall. The episode is fairly standalone in nature with only a few mentions of the Lindus case that Hank and Britt are now the prime witnesses in, but spending 45 minutes with these two guys and this world is beyond enough to sustain my enjoyment."
