= Sins of the Past =

Sins of the Past may refer to:

- "Sins of the Past" (Terriers), 2010 television episode
- Sins of the Past, an episode of Xena: Warrior Princess
- Sins of the Past, an album by Helstar
- "Sins of the Past" (Airwolf), a 1984 television episode
