= Matt Willig =

Actor and former American football player (born 1969)

- Born: Matthew Joseph Willig; January 21, 1969 (age 57); La Mirada, California, U.S.
- Occupations: Actor; American football player
- Years active: 1993–2005 (American Football); 2006–present (acting)
- Children: 2
- Football career

No. 77, 71, 76
- Position: Offensive tackle

Personal information
- Listed height: 6 ft 8 in (2.03 m)
- Listed weight: 315 lb (143 kg)

Career information
- High school: St. Paul (CA)
- College: USC
- NFL draft: 1992: undrafted

Career history
- New York Jets (1992–1995); Atlanta Falcons (1996–1997); Green Bay Packers (1998); Cleveland Browns (1999)*; St. Louis Rams (1999); San Francisco 49ers (2000–2002); Carolina Panthers (2003–2004); St. Louis Rams (2005)
- * Offseason or practice squad member only

Awards and highlights
- Super Bowl champion (XXXIV)

Career NFL statistics
- Games played: 153
- Games started: 43
- Fumble recoveries: 3
- Stats at Pro Football Reference

Matthew Joseph Willig (born January 21, 1969) is an American actor and former professional football offensive tackle in the National Football League (NFL).

== Early life ==
Willig was born in La Mirada, California. He played football and basketball at St. Paul High School (Santa Fe Springs, California). He is of German and Lebanese descent. He played college football at the University of Southern California as a member of the 1989 Rose Bowl winning team. He was a public administration major.

== Professional football career ==
Willig played 14 years for the New York Jets, Atlanta Falcons, Green Bay Packers, St. Louis Rams, San Francisco 49ers, and Carolina Panthers, and was on the Carolina Panthers' team that participatd in Super Bowl XXXVIII.

== Acting career ==
Willig portrayed Special Agent Simon Cade in season eight of NCIS until the first episode of season nine (airdate September 20, 2011). In 2009, he had a supporting role as a brutish caveman tormenting Jack Black and Michael Cera in the motion picture Year One. He appeared as a gang member named Little Chino on the Showtime series, Dexter (2007). He has appeared as a bodyguard named Yuri on the NBC series Chuck, and also has appeared in an episode of My Name is Earl entitled "Bullies". He also appeared in a season 7 episode of Malcolm In the Middle, as Crash, a recovering alcoholic, and had a small role in the 1993 action movie, Full Contact. He appeared in a minor role in iCarly as a truckdriver named "Sledgehammer". He made another guest appearance on The Suite Life on Deck as a genie in season 2 episode 22. On Sonny with a Chance in the "Sonny Get Your Goat" episode, he appeared as "Limo", the mode of transportation to Tawni's motel room in a foreign country, and appeared in the Disney XD show Pair of Kings. Willig also had a supporting role in the second episode of Terriers. He played Mike Drake in the critically acclaimed independent thriller The Employer. He also appears in the 2013 film A Resurrection. In 2011, he was on the CBS soap opera The Young and the Restless, as Billy Abbott's bodyguard, "Tank". More recently he played One Eye, a Mexican drug dealer, in We're the Millers and Gregorek in NBC's series Grimm.

In 2014, he appeared in Season 1 of Brooklyn Nine-Nine as Brandon Jacoby (Season 1, episode 14 : "The Ebony Falcon").

In 2015, Willig had a recurring role as Lash in the third season of the science fiction television series Agents of S.H.I.E.L.D. He also played former NFL player Justin Strzelczyk in the film Concussion.

In 2019, Willig played a Black Satan gang member named Creep in Rob Zombie's film 3 from Hell.

Willig voiced Juggernaut in the Marvel game Spider-Man: Shattered Dimensions.

In February 2021, he appeared as André the Giant in the NBC comedy series Young Rock.

Willig has acted in numerous national commercial campaigns, including a Capital One spot with David Spade, a Bud Light spot, and as an action hero in a Halls commercial.

== Personal life ==
Willig was raised Catholic. He supported the NOH8 Campaign in opposition to California Proposition 8, which made same-sex marriage illegal in the state of California. He criticized "the complete hypocrisy that goes on with the Church, and their stance on gays", and that he had "evolved into feeling that equality and treating everyone the same is the utmost important thing". Despite his disagreement with the Church's stance on same-sex marriage, he was still a practicing Catholic as of 2012.

Willig has two daughters.

== Filmography ==
Film roles
Year	Title	Role	Notes
1993	Full Contact	'Hulk'	
2006	The Benchwarmers	Jock Guy	
2008	A Girl and a Gun	'Superman'	Short film
2009	Year One	Marlak	
2010	Abelar: Tales of an Ancient Empire	Giant Iberian	
2010	Sex Tax: Based on a True Story	Leather Guy	Uncredited
2012	Buds	Bruno	Short film
2012	Guns, Girls and Gambling	The Indian	
2012	The Reef 2: High Tide	Bronson (voice)	Direct-to-video
2012	Christmas in Compton	Charlie	
2013	A Resurrection	Vince	
2013	Bounty Killer	Bob 'Big Bob'	
2013	The Employer	Mike Drake	
2013	We're the Millers	'One-Eye'	
2014	Stretch	Boris	
2015	Wild Card	Kinlaw	
2015	Concussion	Justin Strzelczyk	
2016	Term Life	Thug #1	
2016	The Horde	Stone	Direct-to-Video
2016	Happy Birthday	'El Caballo'	
2016	The Bounce Back	Vladamir	
2017	Keep Watching	The Terror	
2018	Eruption: LA	Serge	
2018	The Ballad of Buster Scruggs	Hard Man #3	
2019	3 from Hell	Creep	
2020	Birds of Prey (and the Fantabulous Emancipation of One Harley Quinn)	Happy	
2024	Fight Another Day	Verus	
2026	The Mandalorian and Grogu	Hogsbreth	

Television roles
Year	Title	Role	Notes
2006	Malcolm in the Middle	'Crash'	Episode: "A.A."
2006	The West Wing	Himself	Episode: "Two Weeks Out"
2006	Everybody Hates Chris	Jason	Episode: "Everybody Hates Superstition"
2007	Dexter	Alfonso Conception / Chino 'Little Chino' Gonzales	2 episodes
2007	Chuck	Uri	Episodes: "Chuck Versus the Tango"
2008	Shark	Hank 'Buzz' Busby	Episode: "Partners in Crime"
2008	iCarly	'Sledgehammer'	Episode: "iHurt Lewbert"
2009	Hydra	Gunner	TV movie
2009	My Name Is Earl	Wally	Episode: "Bullies"
2009	CSI: Crime Scene Investigation	Gorth	Episode: "A Space Oddity"
2010	Cold Case	Chuck 'French' Jaworski '74	Episode: "The Runaway Bunny"
2010	Sonny with a Chance	Lee Moe	Episode: "Sonny Get Your Goat"
2010	The Suite Life on Deck	Genie	Uncredited; Episode: "Rock the Kasbah"
2010	Terriers	Montell	Episode: "Dog and Pony"
2010	Playing with Guns	Larry	TV Pilot
2010–2011	Pair of Kings	Tarantula Leader	3 episodes; Uncredited in two
2011	Chuck	Yuri The Gobbler	Episode: "Chuck Versus the Gobbler"
2011	The Nine Lives of Chloe King	Raoni	Episode: "Dogs of War"
2011	NCIS	NCIS Special Agent Simon Cade	4 episodes
2011	The Young and the Restless	'Tank'	3 episodes
2012	Kickin' It	'Mondo'	Episode: "Rowdy Rudy"
2012	The High Fructose Adventures of Annoying Orange	Cash & Smash Thug #2	Episode: "C.E.O. - Chief Executive Orange"
2013	Grimm	Gregorek	Episode: "Cold Blooded"
2014	Brooklyn Nine-Nine	Brandon Jacoby	Episode: "The Ebony Falcon"
2014	The Legend of Korra	Muscly Man (voice)	Episode: "The Stakeout"
2015	Battle Creek	Dealer	Episode: "The Battle Creek Way"
2015–2016	Agents of S.H.I.E.L.D.	Lash	Recurring; 6 episodes
2016	Flaked	Granger	2 episodes
2016	Blunt Talk	'Tiny'	3 episodes
2017	Type A	Sergeant Dodds	TV Pilot
2018	The Guest Book	Captain Preposterous	1 episode
2018	The Loud House	Prisoner (voice)	Episode: "Tripped!"
2019	Charmed	Dante	Episode: "Keep calm and Harry on"
2021	Young Rock	André the Giant	14 episodes
2025	Wizards Beyond Waverly Place	Archive Guard	Episode: "Raiders of the Locked Archive"
2026	Euphoria	Artur	4 episodes

Video game roles
Year	Title	Role
2010	Spider-Man: Shattered Dimensions	Juggernaut
