= Sins of the Past (Terriers) =

- Terriers episode
- Episode no.: Season 1 Episode 11
- Directed by: Tucker Gates
- Written by: Tim Minear
- Cinematography by: Curtis Wehr
- Editing by: Jordan Goldman; Kimberly Ray
- Production code: 1WAD10
- Original air date: November 17, 2010
- Running time: 43 minutes

Guest appearances
- Alison Elliott as Laura Ross; Chris William Martin as Billy Whitman; Shaun Duke Moosekian as Captain

Episode chronology
← Previous "Asunder"	Next → "Quid Pro Quo"

"Sins of the Past" is the eleventh episode of the American crime comedy-drama television series Terriers. The episode was written by executive producer Tim Minear, and directed by Tucker Gates. It was first broadcast on FX in the United States on November 17, 2010.

The series is set in Ocean Beach, San Diego and focuses on ex-cop and recovering alcoholic Hank Dolworth (Donal Logue) and his best friend, former criminal Britt Pollack (Michael Raymond-James), who both decide to open an unlicensed private investigation business. In the episode, new evidence on an old case makes Hank decide to revisit it, explaining his days as a detective and how he met Britt.

According to Nielsen Media Research, the episode was seen by an estimated 0.725 million household viewers and gained a 0.4/1 ratings share among adults aged 18–49. The episode received critical acclaim, with critics praising the performances, writing, directing, character development, backstory and pacing, with many deeming it one of the best episodes of the series.

== Plot ==
=== Flashbacks ===
Three years ago, an alcoholic Hank (Donal Logue) works as a detective alongside Mark (Rockmond Dunbar). Hank is asked to interrogate Britt (Michael Raymond-James), then a thief stopped near the scene of a rape by Billy Whitman (Chris William Martin), the son of a powerful La Jolla family. Though Hank notes Britt does not match the description of the serial rapist, he questions Britt and is convinced of his innocence, as Britt expressed genuine concern for the woman. Police also recover a phone recording of Britt reporting a woman screaming, so they are forced to let him go.

Hank learns from his wife Gretchen (Kimberly Quinn) that she dated Whitman in college and that Whitman was implicated in a series of sexual assaults at a fraternity party, which his family helped to cover up. After he angrily interrogates Whitman, Mark urges him to recuse himself from the investigation, as his connection to Gretchen and heavy drinking affects it. At home, his relationship with Gretchen deteriorates over his obsession with Whitman. The next day, Hank and Mark bring the victim to a police lineup to identify possible suspects; she notes the voice of Det. Reynolds, acting as a fill-in for the lineup, but does not implicate Whitman despite Hank’s coaching.

Later, Mark interrogates a drunk Hank, informing him Whitman was run off the road and evidence implicating him in the rapes was found planted in his trunk. Hank denies responsibility and lashes out at Mark, while Hank’s captain assures Whitman and his lawyer that Hank will be fired from the police force.

=== Present day ===
Having broken up with Katie (Laura Allen), Britt moves out of the house despite Hank trying to make Britt reconsider. Katie arrives and asks what will happen to Winston, to which an angry Britt tells her to decide. She tearfully chooses to let him go with Britt.

Britt moves in with Hank, and the pair find Laura Ross (Alison Elliott) at his house. She approaches Hank with new information regarding Billy Whitman and the rape cases, which are still unsolved, and they meet with Mark to give him the new information. Britt finds a Polaroid photo of Katie and her classmate Gavin (Zack Silva) from the karaoke night. Though Hank urges him to forget about it and get drunk, Britt sneaks back into their house and uses her laptop to find Gavin’s identity.

At the station, Mark meets with Whitman and his attorney while Hank, Laura, and Detective Ronnie Reynolds (Craig Susser) watch. Mark informs Whitman that they have DNA evidence from a series of connected rapes in Temecula, but Whitman refuses to talk. Mark asks Reynolds to store the DNA evidence, after which Hank and Mark accuse him of committing the rapes. Laura’s reporting and their own recollections of the case show that he was involved in the rapes and planted the evidence in Whitman’s car, as he was the first officer on scene and made the victim recount the events to him in detail. To further confirm his involvement, Hank and Mark show CCTV footage of Reynolds destroying the DNA evidence Mark asked him to handle. Reynolds is arrested and Mark thanks Laura and Hank for their help.

Meanwhile, a drunken Britt corners Gavin at a grocery store and brutally attacks him, leading to his arrest. Hank visits Britt at his cell, telling him that he attacked the wrong man and revealing that Katie told him about what she had done. Hank defends his actions, as Britt proved his point by getting arrested. Britt furiously tells him to leave. In a flashback to after his interrogation, Hank urges Britt to stop his criminal life and find better friends, while Britt tells him he hopes Hank is able to solve the rape case.

== Reception ==
=== Viewers ===
The episode was watched by 0.725 million viewers, earning a 0.4/1 in the 18-49 rating demographics on the Nielson ratings scale. This means that 0.4 percent of all households with televisions watched the episode, while 1 percent of all households watching television at that time watched it. This was a 34% increase in viewership from the previous episode, which was watched by 0.539 million viewers with a 0.2/1 in the 18-49 rating demographics.

=== Critical reviews ===
"Sins of the Past" received critical acclaim. Noel Murray of The A.V. Club gave the episode a "B+" grade and wrote, "As always though, my complaints are more nitpicky than anything: minor gripes at a show that's capable of taking even an alcoholic stupor and finding its finer shading, as 'Sins Of The Past' does elsewhere."

Alan Sepinwall of HitFix wrote, "Though Terriers isn't exactly a show with a complicated mythology like Angel or Firefly, there is a lot of messy history to these characters that predates the events of the pilot. We've had hints or vague descriptions about how Hank lost his job and his wife, how he and Britt met, etc., and it feels right that we should dig up the past before Hank can make his move against Zeitlin in the final episodes." Ken Tucker of Entertainment Weekly wrote, "This week's episode of Terriers was the new series' best hour to date. It took the oldest trick in the TV handbook — a flashback episode that showed us how our heroes arrived at the point in their lives we're now following — and made it triumphant storytelling."

Matt Richenthal of TV Fanatic gave the episode a 4.7 star rating out of 5 and wrote, "Many shows make the mistake of using flashbacks as nothing but a gimmick, revealing very little about characters and simply assuming viewers will be happy with the mere idea of going back in time. But 'Sins of the Past' gave us the answer to a pressing question - why did Hank's marriage fall apart? - while tying that storyline into present day events and character developments. It was yet another outstanding outing for what long ago stopped being the best show no one is watching, and started to come very close to being the best show on TV. Period." Cory Barker of TV Overmind wrote, "'Sins of the Past' is a flashback episode to the case that cost Hank his job and his marriage and it's also unbelievably powerful. I can't say for sure because the recency effect might in play here, but as of now, 'Sins' is definitely my favorite episode of the season and is absolutely one of the 2-3 best thus far."
