= Hell High =

- Theatrical release poster
- Directed by: Douglas Grossman
- Written by: Leo Evans; Douglas Grossman
- Produced by: Douglas Grossman; David Steinman
- Starring: Christopher Stryker; Maureen Mooney; Christopher Cousins; Millie Prezioso; Jason Brill
- Cinematography: Steven Fierberg
- Edited by: Greg Sheldon; Claire Simpson
- Music by: Chris Hyams-Hart; Rich Macar
- Production company: DGS Productions
- Distributed by: JGM Enterprises
- Release date: May 12, 1989
- Running time: 84 minutes
- Country: United States
- Language: English

Hell High is a 1989 American slasher film written, produced, and directed by Douglas Grossman, and starring Christopher Stryker, Jason Brill, Maureen Mooney, Christopher Cousins, and Millie Prezioso. The film centers on a school teacher who suffers a mental breakdown after being harassed and attacked by a group of her students, driving her into a homicidal rage.

== Plot ==
As a child, Brooke Storm goes to play with her dolls in a shack along a biking path in the marsh near her home. A man and his girlfriend arrive by motorcycle, and Brooke hides behind the shack while the man violently attempts to force his girlfriend to have sex with him. When she refuses, the two depart on his motorcycle. As they turn around and pass by the shack, Brooke throws a bucket of wet mud at them, causing him to lose control of his motorcycle, and both are killed when they are impaled on nearby fenceposts.

Eighteen years later, Brooke lives alone in her childhood home, and is haunted by the deaths she caused as a child, which are now considered unsolved murders. Brooke works as a domineering and neurotic high school biology teacher who is unliked by her students. One of them, senior Dickens, is particularly antagonistic toward Brooke, and when he taunts and humiliates her during an exam, she slaps him in the face. Dickens and his friend Jon-Jon follow Brooke home in their car, and spy through her bathroom window while she masturbates in the shower.

The next day, Jon-Jon goes to pick up his new waver classmate Queenie at her home to attend the football game, where they meet with Dickens and their prankster friend, Smiler. The four disrupt the football game by driving Dickens' car onto the field before fleeing. Dickens devises a nebulous revenge prank against Brooke, and brings his friends to the marsh where the young couple were killed eighteen years prior. There, they gather swamp mud and then approach Brooke's house, donning Halloween masks. They climb onto her roof and begin pounding their feet, and throwing mud at the windows. When Brooke steps outside, they dump a bucket of mud on her, triggering traumatic memories of the deaths she caused as a child.

The teenagers flee when Brooke's friend Mink arrives, finding Brooke in a paranoid fugue state. Mink provides Brooke with a quaalude to calm her nerves. After she leaves, Dickens enters the house and finds Brooke nearly incoherent. When Dickens and Queenie begin to sexually assault Brooke, Jon-Jon and Smiler intervene. A fight ensues, during which Brooke leaps from her bed and jumps through a second-story window. Assuming Brooke to be dead, Dickens sends Jon-Jon to the local diner to steal a belonging from one of the school's football players, which they can leave behind in Brooke's house, framing the football players for her murder. Jon-Jon slashes the quarterback's tires and steals a jersey from his car. The quarterback and his teammate chase after Jon-Jon on a motorcycle, but lose control and crash.

Meanwhile, Queenie angrily leaves the house. Outside, she finds Brooke crying in the woods. Queenie approaches Brooke, relieved to see that she is alive, only for Brooke to bludgeon her to death with a rock. When Jon-Jon goes to investigate, Brooke also bludgeons him, rendering him unconscious. Brooke returns inside the house, where she stabs Smiler through the temple with a pencil, killing him. When Dickens goes to help him, Brooke lunges down the staircase with a butcher knife, and stabs Dickens in the chest. Jon-Jon regains consciousness and returns inside the house, where he finds an injured Dickens bound to a wall, where Brooke is preparing to perform a live autopsy on him. Jon-Jon incapacitates Brooke and frees Dickens, but she soon awakens. Armed with the butcher knife, Dickens leaps on top of her, and is impaled with a firepoker she is wielding; Brooke's throat is slashed in the process. Jon-Jon leaves the quarterback's jersey in the house, and returns home and hides in his bedroom.

At school the following day, police arrive when Brooke fails to appear. They enter the biology class, overseen by a substitute teacher, and swiftly arrest the school quarterback. Jon-Jon is momentarily relieved, until he hallucinates that Brooke is the substitute teacher.

== Cast ==
- Christopher Stryker as Dickens
- Maureen Mooney as Miss Brooke Storm
- Christopher Cousins as Jon-Jon
- Millie Prezioso as Queenie
- Jason Brill as Smiler
- Kathryn Rossetter as Coach Sandy Hand
- J.R. Horne as Coach Heaton
- Victoria Andahazy as Mink
- Cylk Cozart as Wide Receiver

== Production ==
The film was shot on location in Westchester County, New York.

== Release ==
The film was released theatrically in the United States beginning May 12, 1989.

=== Home media ===
Hell High was released on DVD by Shriek Show on July 13, 2004. It was later re-released by the company as a part of its three-disk, High School Horrors Pack on November 15, 2005. On July 18, 2022, Arrow Films released Hell High on Blu-ray in North America and the United Kingdom, featuring a new restoration from the original film elements.

== Reception ==
=== Critical response ===
Richard Harrington from The Washington Post gave the film a negative review, writing, "Even within the limited expectations of the horror genre, it's not particularly satisfying, since the chills are all on the cheap. However, sitting through Hell High is likely to bring back at least one high school memory, that of a long, long, long detention, made worse because you have to pay for it." Bill O'Connor of the Akron Beacon Journal panned the film for its screenplay, which he found illogical, and awarded the film a one out of four-star rating.

The New York Daily News wrote that the film "might have been an okay low-budget sickie. Auteur Grossman succeeds in creating a stark, autumnal atmosphere, and the movie's post-slaughter fadeout scenes are likewise well rendered. But the pic gets on track way too late to compensate for its meandering setup reels and occasionally risible dialogue."

Cavett Binion of AllMovie was unimpressed by the film, calling it a "routine slasher-thriller", though one that "deviates slightly from the standard formula by way of a fairly intelligent script."

Most reviews were negative. However, Brett Gallman on his website Oh, the Horror! considers it "a weird, gangly, messy perversion of 80s slashers", commending the film's darker narrative, performances, and dismantling of the typical slasher film formula.
