= Michael Offer =

Australian film and television director

- Occupation(s): Film director, television director
- Years active: 1986–present

Michael Offer is an Australian film and television director.

His television credits range from directing episodes of television series in his home country, Australia, to other regions such as the United Kingdom and the United States. Those credits include G.P., Water Rats, Sir Arthur Conan Doyle's The Lost World, The Bill, Holby City, Casualty, Homeland, The State Within, The Passion, Moses Jones, Persons Unknown, Terriers, The Chicago Code, Arrow, Last Resort, How to Get Away with Murder, The Punisher, Hightown, Helstrom, The Cleaning Lady, Alert: Missing Persons Unit, Accused, and Ransom Canyon.

Offer is a graduate of Australian Film Television and Radio School.
