= Gareth Williams (American actor) =

American actor (born 1965)

- Born: February 28, 1965 (age 60)
- Occupation: Television actor
- Years active: 1981–present

Gareth Williams (born 28 February 1965) is an American actor.

Williams attended Palm Beach State College. He played astronaut James Irwin in the HBO miniseries From the Earth to the Moon (1998), and was in such films as Malcolm X (1992), Volcano (1997), and The Cell (2000). He has a long list of television credits including Dawson's Creek, Time of Your Life, Angel, Law & Order, and Mad About You.
