= Scott Klace =

American actor (born 1961)

- Born: Scott M. Kloes; January 9, 1961 (age 65); Westerville, Ohio, U.S.
- Other name: Scott M. Klace
- Spouse: Shelley

Scott Klace (born Scott M. Kloes; January 9, 1961) is an American actor. He has appeared in over 100 films, television series, and cartoons.

== Early television and film appearances ==
Klace graduated from Westerville North High School in June 1979. During his first years of acting behind the main characters, he was often credited as Scott M. Kloes. His professional career began in the television film The 10 Million Dollar Getaway (1991) as John Murray. Over the next eight years, Klace appeared in several other television series, such as Beverly Hills, 90210 (1996), Seinfeld (1998) and 3rd Rock from the Sun (1998), as well as a few films, including Money for Nothing (1993), Heavy Gear (1997), and Roommates (1995). His most notable appearance came in the final episode of Seinfeld, where he played the jailer of the four main characters.

== More recent work ==
He began using the spelling Klace in 1999 when he played Dremk in an episode of Star Trek: Voyager, and Fox in the film Wishmaster 2: Evil Never Dies. He then went on to perform other small roles in television shows and direct to video films, including American Tragedy (2002), The Guardian (2002), Charmed (2003), 24 (2003), ER (2004), NYPD Blue (2004), and Malcolm in the Middle (2006).

In 2006, he started becoming a regular fixture on King of the Hill. Between 2006 and the end of the show in 2009, Klace appeared in over 30 episodes, never playing the same character twice.

== Personal life ==
He is married to Shelley Klace and has two daughters, Flynn and Delaney.

== Filmography (motion pictures) ==
- The Pursuit of Happyness (2006), Tim Brophy
- Déjà Vu, Police Lieutenant #1
- Bullethead (2002), Luane
- Mimic 2 (2001), Daryl
- American Tragedy (2000), Peter Neufeld
- Wishmaster 2: Evil Never Dies (1999), Fox
- Heavy Gear (1997), Col. Junus
- The Lottery Ticket (1997)
- The Assassination File (1996), Cop #1
- Roommates (1995), Cecilia's Son
- Striking Distance (1993), Card Player
- Money for Nothing (1993), Investment Counselor
- What She Doesn't Know (1992), Landrum
- The 10 Million Dollar Getaway (1991), John Murray

== Filmography (television) ==
- Bosch 2014-21, Sgt. John Mankiewicz
- Eyes 1x01 - Investigator (2007), Det. Ryan Giggs
- Navy NCIS: Naval Criminal Investigative Service 4x16 - Dead Man Walking (2007), Dr. Timothy Hass
- Boston Legal 3x14 - Selling Sickness (2007), Dr. Mitchell Levinson
- Dirt 1x06 - The Secret Lives of Altar Girls (2007), D.A. Alan Joss
- Without a Trace 5x04 - All for One (2006), Kurt Hollingsworth
- Studio 60 on the Sunset Strip 1x02 - The Cold Open (2006), Peter Goldman
- King of the Hill
  - 10x15 - Edu-macating Lucky (2006), Voices
  - 10x14 - Hank's Bully (2006), Voices
  - 10x12 - 24 Hour Propane People (2006), Voices
  - 10x10 - Hank Fixes Everything (2006), Voices
  - 10x08 - Business is Picking Up (2006), Voices
  - 10x07 - You Gotta Believe (In Moderation) (2006), Voices
  - 10x03 - Bill's House (2006), Mikey/Randy/Proud Father
  - 10x02 - Bystand Me (2005), Voices
  - 10x01 - Hank's on Board (2005), Voices
  - 9x13 - Gone with the Windstorm (2005), Voices
  - 9x12 - Smoking and the Bandit (2005), Voices
  - 9x05 - Hail to the Chief (2005), Gerald-Tax Assessor
- Invasion 2005-6 - Steve (character)

== Filmography (Corporate Video) ==
- Multiple Wendy's training videos (early 1990s)
