= Terriers (TV series) =

American crime comedy-drama television series

- Genre: Crime drama Comedy-drama; Neo-noir; Black comedy
- Created by: Ted Griffin
- Starring: Donal Logue; Michael Raymond-James; Laura Allen; Kimberly Quinn; Jamie Denbo; Rockmond Dunbar
- Opening theme: "Gunfight Epiphany" by Robert Duncan
- Composer: Robert Duncan
- Country of origin: United States
- Original language: English
- No. of seasons: 1
- No. of episodes: 13

Production
- Executive producers: Shawn Ryan; Tim Minear; Ted Griffin
- Producer: Ed Milkovich
- Production locations: San Diego, California
- Editors: David Kaldor; Jordan Goldman; Kimberly Ray; Gregg Featherman
- Running time: 41–51 minutes
- Production companies: MiddKid Productions; Rickshaw Productions; Fox 21

Original release
- Network: FX
- Release: September 8 – December 1, 2010

Terriers is an American crime comedy-drama television series created by Ted Griffin that aired on FX from September 8 to December 1, 2010. The show was canceled by FX on December 6, 2010, after the first season.

== Premise ==
Ex-cop and recovering alcoholic Hank Dolworth partners with his best friend, former criminal Britt Pollack, in an unlicensed private investigation business. The series is set in Ocean Beach, San Diego, California, although it is portrayed as a distinct town, with Dolworth having once been a member of the fictional Ocean Beach Police Department.

== Cast ==
=== Main ===
- Donal Logue as Henry "Hank" Dolworth
- Michael Raymond-James as Britt Pollack
- Laura Allen as Katie Nichols, Britt's girlfriend
- Kimberly Quinn as Gretchen Dolworth, Hank's ex-wife
- Jamie Denbo as Maggie Lefferts, Hank's attorney and part-time employer
- Rockmond Dunbar as Detective Mark Gustafson, Hank's friend and former partner

=== Recurring ===
- Loren Dean as Jason Adler, Gretchen's fiancé
- Karina Logue as Stephanie "Steph" Dolworth, Hank's sister (Karina and Donal Logue are real-life siblings as well)
- Alison Elliott as Laura Ross, a muckraking blogger
- Michael Gaston as Ben Zeitlin, local attorney
- Maximiliano Hernández as Ray, Britt's former criminal associate
- Daren Scott as Burke (the "man in the tan suit"), Zeitlin's "muscle"
- Alex Fernie as Swift, one of the "Squatters"
- Alex Berg as Blodgett, one of the "Squatters"
- Todd Fasen as Gunt, one of the "Squatters"
- Johnny Sneed as Professor Elliot Owen, Katie's college teacher
- Rachel Miner as Eleanor Gosney, daughter of Hank's old drinking buddy
- Craig Susser as Detective Ronnie Reynolds, Mark's current partner on the force
- Stephen Frejek as Officer Robledo, a fellow cop
- Zack Silva as Gavin, Katie's college friend
- Christopher Cousins as Robert Lindus, local land developer

== Reception ==
On the review aggregation website Rotten Tomatoes, the series holds an approval rating of 93% with an average rating of 6.7 out of 10, based on 27 reviews. The website's critical consensus reads, "Well-acted and quite funny, Terriers breathes quirky new life into the detective show." Metacritic, which uses a weighted average, assigned the series a score of 75 out of 100 based on 24 critics, indicating "generally favorable reviews".

Time's James Poniewozik ranked Terriers at #10 on his top 10 list of television shows in 2010. The Daily Beast's Jace Lacob selected the show as part of his top 10 shows of 2010. HitFix's Alan Sepinwall ranked Terriers at #3 on his top 10 list for 2010 as well as #1 on his list of best new shows of 2010. The A.V. Club ranked it as #7 on their list of best shows of 2010. IGN's Matt Fowler gave the entire season a "10" and called it a "massively gratifying TV experience like no other." IGN also gave Terriers their award for "Best New Series of 2010". The series received a nomination for Outstanding New Program by the Television Critics Association.

In 2023, Shawn Ryan give his opinion about Terriers' legacy:

I think Terriers was ahead of its time. That would have been a fun show to make for Netflix or Amazon or Apple and let people discover it on their own time. I blame myself for not pushing better for a better title. And I think FX would admit that they never got the marketing right on that show. I think that show happened at the wrong time, at the wrong place.

== Episodes ==
No.	Title	Directed by	Written by	Original release date	Prod. code	US viewers (millions)
1	"Pilot"	Craig Brewer	Ted Griffin	September 8, 2010	1WAD79	1.61
Hank and Britt try to locate the daughter of Hank's old drinking buddy, Mickey, and realize that she's hiding from her boss Robert Lindus (Christopher Cousins), local real estate developer and bigwig, after having recorded one of his private conversations. Mickey ends up dead, and when Hank's ex-partner, Detective Mark Gustafson (Rockmond Dunbar), doesn't believe he was murdered by Lindus, Hank and Britt frame Lindus for a different murder. Hank tries to buy his old house from his ex-wife, Gretchen (Kimberly Quinn).
2	"Dog and Pony"	Clark Johnson	Shawn Ryan & Jed Seidel	September 15, 2010	1WAD01	0.822
Hank desperately needs money to pay for the house after Lindus's cheque is confiscated by the police as evidence. The duo try to claim a reward by apprehending a fugitive and get more than they bargained for.
3	"Change Partners"	Guy Ferland	Phoef Sutton	September 22, 2010	1WAD02	0.568
Hank and Britt have to deal with the case of the head of a mortgage agency (Shawn Doyle) who gets off being cuckolded by his wife Miriam (Olivia Williams). Hank is promised a mortgage for positive evidence of infidelity, but the wife turns out to be faithful. So Hank and Kate (Laura Allen), Britt's girlfriend, help Britt and Miriam stage an affair. While Hank gets his mortgage, things don't end well either for him, or the couple. Hank investigates Gretchen's fiancé. After Britt's partner from his B&E days, Ray (Maximiliano Hernández), shows up, he confesses to Kate about an event from his past.
4	"Fustercluck"	Michael Offer	Jon Worley	September 29, 2010	1WAD03	0.649
Lindus claims that he didn't kill Mickey and that his wife and son are in danger from his associates. He offers Hank and Britt $100,000 to steal bearer bonds which he has hidden in his now-sealed office. When they realize he bailed himself out and is trying to flee with his family, they grab him. However, he dies in Hank's house of injuries incurred in an accident while trying to escape. Hank finds out that his schizophrenic sister, Stephanie (Karina Logue), has been living in his attic.
5	"Manifest Destiny"	Rian Johnson	Leslye Headland	October 6, 2010	1WAD04	0.486
Hank and Britt dispose of Lindus's body by making it look like a case of drunk driving. Hank runs into a high-powered attorney, Ben Zeitlin (Michael Gaston), an associate of Lindus who wants a soil study that Lindus apparently possessed. Hank realizes that these are the people that killed Mickey.
6	"Ring-a-Ding-Ding"	Billy Gierhart	Angela Kang	October 13, 2010	1WAD05	0.506
Hank & Stephanie and Britt & Kate attend Gretchen's engagement ceremony. Hank and Britt solve a case brought by their lawyer Maggie (Jamie Denbo) that involves a rich wife dying from cancer and her adulterous husband. After a night of heavy drinking, Kate messes up by sleeping with her professor at the vet school. She confides in Hank who tells her to keep it a secret lest it breaks Britt's heart.
7	"Missing Persons"	Michael Zinberg	Jed Seidel	October 20, 2010	1WAD06	0.444
Britt notices Kate's emotional distance and freaks out. Stephanie, who has been off her medication for weeks, suffers a particularly severe hallucinatory episode. Hank arranges for her to be placed in assisted living. Hank and Britt handle a case involving a young amnesiac who might have kidnapped someone.
8	"Agua Caliente"	John Dahl	Phoef Sutton & Jon Worley	October 27, 2010	1WAD07	0.465
Britt finds himself in Mexico after being kidnapped by a cartel thanks to his old B&E partner Ray. Hank and Mark drive across the border to rescue him. After the trio make their way back to the US, Hank gets shot by a cartel man while trying to protect Kate.
9	"Pimp Daddy"	Adam Arkin	Shawn Ryan & Kelly Wheeler	November 3, 2010	1WAD08	0.667
While Hank is recuperating from his injury, Britt takes up the case of a transgender prostitute Michela (D.J. "Shangela" Pierce) looking for the murderer of her friend. Maggie informs Hank that Gretchen's soon-to-be husband Jason (Loren Dean) might be a child molester. When Hank brings up the matter before Gretchen, she's furious for his having spied on Jason. Britt proposes to Kate.
10	"Asunder"	Ted Griffin	Nicholas Griffin	November 10, 2010	1WAD09	0.539
Even after being dis-invited from Gretchen's wedding, Hank turns up at the hotel and finds himself caught up in a case where Zeitlin (Michael Gaston) threatens a freelance reporter Laura Ross (Alison Elliott) investigating Zeitlin's ties to various land deals in and around Ocean Beach. Britt discovers Kate's infidelity and pregnancy and breaks up with her.
11	"Sins of the Past"	Tucker Gates	Tim Minear	November 17, 2010	1WAD10	0.725
Thanks to Laura Ross, Hank and Mark manage to solve a bad case from the past involving a serial rapist, a case that resulted in Hank losing his job. Britt beats up Gavin (Zack Silva), Kate's classmate, thinking she slept with him, and ends up in jail. Hank tells Britt about the mistaken identity, and Britt is angry about having been kept in the dark.
12	"Quid Pro Quo"	Adam Arkin	Angela Kang & Leslye Headland	November 24, 2010	1WAD11	0.542
Britt pretends to work for Zeitlin to keep himself out of jail for assault & battery and meets one of Zeitlin's subordinates, Ashley (Elizabeth Chomko), to check out if she's the whistle-blower in his office. Maggie points Hank and Laura towards one of her clients, Councilman Sam Albrecht (Scott Klace), who has his own misgivings about Zeitlin. They team up with Jason, whose own project is in Zeitlin's cross-hairs, and realize that all plans point to a land grab for a new airport. Jason and the actual whistle-blower are killed during a meet and Laura disappears. Hank and Britt realize that Albrecht is working with Zeitlin.
13	"Hail Mary"	Ted Griffin	Ted Griffin & Nicholas Griffin	December 1, 2010	1WAD12	0.784
After Zeitlin frames Hank for Jason's murder, Hank escapes with Mark's help. He kills Zeitlin's muscle, Burke, after being attacked in his own house. Hank and Britt corner Zeitlin on his boat and get confirmation that Cutshaw (Neal McDonough) is the man behind the whole enterprise. Hank uses incriminating photographs featuring Cutshaw to strike a deal with him that would take the airport project out of Ocean Beach. Britt accepts the fact that he's going to prison and makes up with Kate. While driving Britt to prison, Hank tells him they could always go on the run; cross over into Mexico. The duo are last seen waiting at a red light, with the road to Mexico on the left and the one to prison straight ahead.
