= Ted Griffin =

American screenwriter (born 1970)

- Born: December 21, 1970 (age 55); Pasadena, California, U.S.
- Occupation: Screenwriter
- Years active: 1996–present
- Spouse: Sutton Foster (m. 2014; sep. 2024)
- Children: 1
- Relatives: William A. Seiter (grandfather); Marian Nixon (grandmother)

Ted Griffin (born December 21, 1970) is an American screenwriter whose credits include Ravenous, Rumor Has It, and Ocean's Eleven.

Born in Pasadena, California, Griffin graduated from Colgate University in 1993. While attending university he helped to create the comedy troupe, Broken Lizard. He was scheduled to make his directorial debut with Rumor Has It..., for which he had written the original screenplay, but was replaced by Rob Reiner 12 days after principal filming began. He did a rewrite on the 2010 Ashton Kutcher film Killers. He moved into television by creating Terriers for FX. Griffin played Agent Hughes in The Wolf of Wall Street.

His brother is screenwriter Nicholas Griffin. His maternal grandparents were director William A. Seiter and Finnish American actress Marian Nixon.

Griffin was married to actress Sutton Foster from October 25, 2014, until she filed for divorce in October 2024.

== Filmography ==
Screenwriter, plus other contributions as noted.

- Puddle Cruiser (1996) as Rick Johnson
- Ravenous (1999, Writer)
- Best Laid Plans (1999, Writer)
- Ocean's Eleven (2001, Writer)
- Matchstick Men (2003, Writer, with Nicholas Griffin)
- Must Love Dogs (2005) as Bill Jr.
- Rumor Has It... (2005, Writer)
- The Shield (2006, TV Series, Writer)
- Killers (2010) (with Bob DeRosa)
- Terriers (2011, TV Series, Writer) (also creator with Shawn Ryan)
- Tower Heist (2011) (with Jeff Nathanson)
- Prom (2011, Producer)
- Shoot the Messenger (2012, also Director)
- The Wolf of Wall Street (2013, Co-producer) (also cameo as Agent Hughes)
- Solace (2015, Writer)
- Pretend It's a City (2021, executive producer)
