= Christopher Cousins =

American actor

- Born: September 27, 1960 (age 66); New York City, U.S.
- Education: Boston University
- Occupation: Actor
- Years active: 1986–present

Christopher Maher Cousins (born September 27, 1960) is an American actor who has been acting in television since 1986. He is best known for playing conman Cain Rogan in forty-one episodes of the soap opera One Life to Live. Between 2009 and 2012, he played Ted Beneke in thirteen episodes of the AMC series Breaking Bad. In 2013 and 2014, he played Victor Doyle in seven episodes of the NBC series Revolution.

== Early life and education ==
Cousins was born in New York City and raised in Oklahoma, where he attended Norman High School. He graduated from Boston University and relocated to New York City to act in theatre productions.

== Career ==
Notable film roles include David Williams in Untraceable (2008), the villain Daniel in Wicker Park (2004), Bill in The Grudge 2 (2006), and the father of the main characters in Legally Blondes. He also made an appearance on Glee, on the episode "Puppet Master". He has also appeared in an episode of House, M.D., as a victim's father on an episode called "Distractions" in season 2 episode 12.

He was in season 3 of Supernatural, he played a doctor whose comatose daughter is the spirit in "Bedtime Stories". He also appeared on Criminal Minds, as a trauma surgeon on an episode called "Nameless, Faceless" in season 5, episode 1. He also appeared on Designated Survivor, as Senator Rouse. In 2016, he had a recurring role as Martin Weiss, an attorney for an Armenian mobster in Bosch.

In 2024, it was announced that Cousins would appear on The Young and the Restless as Alan Laurent. He made his first appearance on April 30, 2024. He made his final appearance as Alan on June 7, 2024, with the character being killed by his identical twin brother, Martin Laurent, who assumed his identity. Although Alan last appeared on June 7, 2024, Cousins continued to be credited as Alan until April 10, 2025, when Martin’s deception was exposed and the actor exited the role. In July 2026, it was announced that Cousins would reprise the role of Martin for a special guest appearance on July 22, 2026.

== Filmography ==
=== Film ===
Year	Title	Role	Notes
1989	Hell High	Jon-Jon	
1998	The Substitute 2: School's Out	Randall Thomasson	Direct-to-video
1998	A Wing and a Prayer	Evan Lansing	Television film
1999	Mind Prey		Television film
1999	For Love of the Game	Ian	
2001	Earth vs. the Spider	Officer Williams	Television film
2001	Dead Dog	Marquett	
2004	The Long Shot	John Oaks	Television film
2004	Wicker Park	Daniel	
2005	Mystery Woman: Vision of a Murder	Adam	Television film
2006	Grounds Zero	Phone Booth 1	Short film
2006	The Grudge 2	Bill	
2007	Final Approach	Vince Gilford	Television film
2008	Untraceable	David Williams	
2009	Legally Blondes	Mr. Richard Woods	
2009	Hangman	Phillip	
2011	William & Kate: The Movie	Michael Middleton	Television film
2012	The Diary of Preston Plummer	Walter Cather	
2012	Americana	Simon	Television film
2014	Draft Day	Max Stone	
2018	Caretakers	Former Ambassador Chris Williams	
2019	Check Inn to Christmas	Bill Mason	Television film

=== Television ===
Year	Title	Role	Notes
1986–1987	Another World	Greg Houston	
1990	As the World Turns	Colin Crowley	
1991–2008	One Life to Live	Cain Rogan	
1994, 1997	Law & Order	Robert Dorning / Todd Locke	2 episodes
1994	New York Undercover	Colin	Episode 1.12: "Blondes Have More Fun"
1996	Swift Justice	Cole	Episode 1.13: "Retribution"
1997	Prince Street		Episode 1.4: "Drugs, Lies and Videotape"
1998	Night Man	Jonathan Leland	Episode 1.15: "House of Soul"
2000	JAG	Chief Sturtevant	Episode 5.14: "Cabin Pressure"
2000	Opposite Sex	Mr. Will Perry	4 episodes
2001	Family Law	Jesse Gibson	Episode 2.19: "The Gay Divorcee"
2001	Stargate SG-1	Ambassador Joseph Faxon	2 episodes
2001	The Invisible Man	Jack Carelli	Episode 2.15: "A Sense of Community"
2001	Crossing Jordan	Father Lynch	Episode 1.3: "The Ties That Bind"
2002	Boston Public	Mark Tanner	Episode 2.16: "Chapter Thirty-Eight"
2002	The Practice	Ralph Alt	Episode 7.8: "Bad to Worse"
2003–2005	American Dreams	Ted Pryor	4 episodes
2003	Miracles	Charles Jergensen	Episode 1.2: "The Friendly Skies"
2003	The O.C.	Greg Fischer	Episode 1.4: "The Debut"
2003	The West Wing	Congressman Thiele	Episode 5.4: "Han"
2004	ER	Kyle Kolber	Episode 10.12: "NICU"
2004	Joan of Arcadia	Tom Murphy	2 episodes
2004	Without a Trace	Ted Fortman	Episode 3.6: "Nickel and Dimed"
2005	CSI: Miami	Cyrus Templeton	Episode 3.16: "Nothing to Lose"
2005	Close to Home	Robert Flynn	Episode 1.2: "Miranda"
2005	CSI: NY	Oscar Bowers	Episode 2.6: "YoungBlood"
2005	Cold Case	Ned Burton	Episode 3.8: "Honor"
2006	In Justice	Richard Kenyon	Episode 1.4: "Confessions"
2006	Las Vegas	Chairman of Gaming Commission	Episode 3.14: "And Here's Mike with the Weather"
2006	House	Doug	Episode 2.12: "Distractions"
2006	Shark	Richard Metcalfe	Episode 1.10: "Sins of the Mother"
2006	Vanished	Judge Wallace Rainer	8 episodes
2007	The Shield	Benjamin Webb	Episode 6.10: "Spanish Practices"
2007	Monk	Lt. Hendrix	Episode 6.4: "Mr. Monk and the Bad Girlfriend"
2007	Supernatural	Dr. Garrison	Episode 3.5: "Bedtime Stories"
2007	Cane	Agent Clark	Episode 1.8: "All Bets Are Off"
2008	Moonlight	Kent Morrow	Episode 1.13: "Fated to Pretend"
2008	Lipstick Jungle	Charles Reilly	6 episodes
2009	NCIS	Mr. Jones	Episode 6.21: "Toxic"
2009	Chuck	Bill Bergey	Episode 2.20: "Chuck Versus the First Kill"
2009	Hawthorne	Aaron Breyer	Episode 1.7: "Night Moves"
2009	Criminal Minds	Dr. Barton	Episode 5.1: "Faceless, Nameless"
2009–2012	Breaking Bad	Ted Beneke	13 episodes
2010	Miami Medical	Truman	Episode 1.7: "Man on the Road"
2010	In Plain Sight	Vince Anderson / Vince Jordan	Episode 3.12: "WitSec Stepmother"
2010	Nikita	Henry Sampson	Episode 1.3: "Kill Jill"
2010	Terriers	Robert Lindus	3 episodes
2010	Chase	Craig Wilson	Episode 1.6: "Havoc"
2010	Law & Order: LA	Nelson's Lawyer	Episode 1.5: "Pasadena"
2011	Southland	Peter Wellington	Episode 3.5: "The Winds"
2011	The Defenders	Rick Neville	Episode 1.16: "Noland v. Galloway Pharmaceuticals"
2011	Body of Proof	Dr. David Cryer	Episode 2.8: "Love Bites"
2012	Hawaii Five-0	Rick Summers	Episode 2.13: "Ka Ho' Oponopono"
2012	Ringer	Tobias Schecht	Episode 1.19: "Let's Kill Bridget"
2012	Awake	John Ferriss	Episode 1.7: "Ricky's Tacos"
2012	Drop Dead Diva	Dr. Bradley Alton	Episode 4.13: "Jane's Getting Married"
2012	Vegas	Randall	Episode 1.4: "(Il) Legitimate"
2012	Private Practice	Eli Wilson	Episode 6.7: "The World According to Jake"
2012	Rizzoli & Isles	Sam Nelson	Episode 3.15: "No More Drama in My Life"
2013	Ben and Kate	Dave	Episode 1.14: "Gone Fishin'"
2013	The Mentalist	Jason Lennon	2 episodes
2013	Chicago Fire	Steven Goody	2 episodes
2013	Longmire	Calvin Cowley	Episode 2.6: "Tell It Slant"
2013	Castle	Nolan Burns	Episode 6.6: "Get a Clue"
2013	CSI: Crime Scene Investigation	Ken Wallace	Episode 14.8: "Helpless"
2013	Major Crimes	Dr. Charles Mason	Episode 2.14: "All In"
2013–2014	Twisted	Mayor John Rollins	3 episodes
2013–2014	Revolution	Victor Doyle	7 episodes
2013–2015	Glee	Superintendent Bob Harris	7 episodes
2014	Matador	Llewyn Smith	8 episodes
2014–2015	The Vampire Diaries	Joshua Parker	4 episodes
2015	Code Black	John Harris	Episode 1.7: "Buen Árbol"
2015	CSI: Cyber	Mason Lynne	2 episodes
2016	Bosch	Martin Weiss	4 episodes
2016–2018	UnREAL	Gary	10 episodes
2017	Famous in Love	Paige's Dad	Episode 1.2: "A Star Is Torn"
2017	Training Day	Ken Patterson	2 episodes
2017	Designated Survivor	Senator Alan Rouse	Episode 2.5: "Suckers"
2017	The Exorcist	Peter Osborne	4 episodes
2017	Kevin (Probably) Saves the World	Sam Haslett	2 episodes
2018	The Gifted	Lawrence Hayes	Episode 2.9: "gaMe changer"
2019	L.A.'s Finest	Dan Howser	2 episodes
2019	9-1-1	Charles Bryson	Episode 3.1: "Kids Today"
2020	General Hospital	Dr. Warren Kirk	6
2021	Goliath	Samuel Margolis	Episode 4.3: "Signed, William Hamilton McBride"
2022–2023	The Resident	Marco	2 episodes
2024–2026	The Young and the Restless	Alan Laurent / Martin Laurent	Recurring role
2024	High Potential	John Ashford	1 episode
