= Donal Logue =

Canadian actor (born 1966)

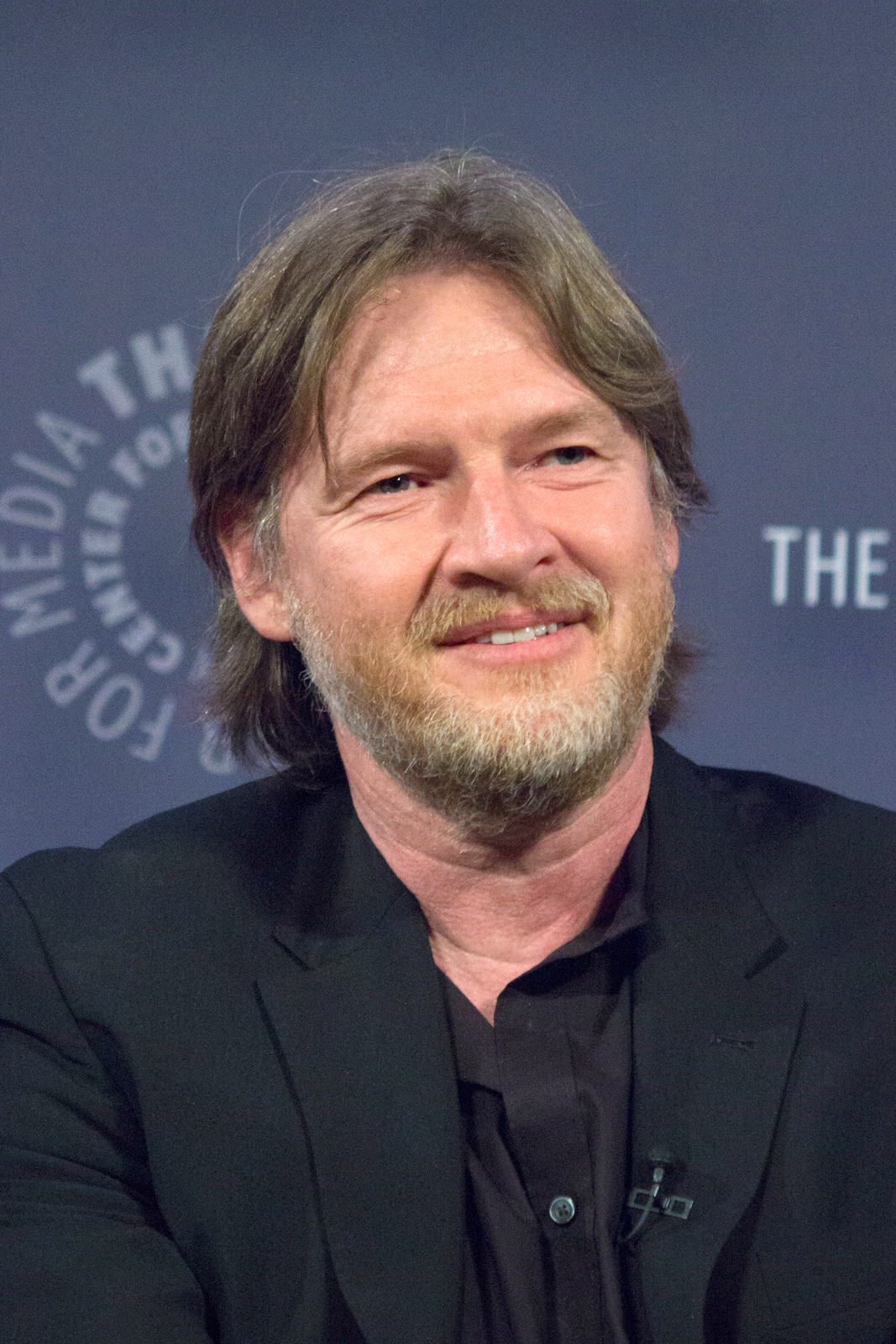
- Logue in 2014
- Born: Donal Francis Logue; February 27, 1966 (age 60); Ottawa, Ontario, Canada
- Citizenship: Canada; United States; Ireland
- Education: Harvard University
- Occupation: Actor
- Years active: 1991–present
- Known for: The Tao of Steve (2000); Grounded for Life (2001–2005); Sons of Anarchy (2012–2013); Vikings (2013–2014); Gotham (2014–2019)
- Spouse: Kasey Walker (divorced)
- Children: 2

Donal Francis Logue (born February 27, 1966) is a Canadian-American film and television actor. He played the starring role of Sean Finnerty on the sitcom Grounded for Life (2001–05), and Detective Harvey Bullock on the DC Comics adaptation Gotham (2014–19). He is also known for playing flight nurse Chuck Martin on ER (2003–05), Lee Toric on Sons of Anarchy (2012–13), Horik on Vikings (2013–14), and the recurring role of Lt. (later Captain) Declan Murphy on Law & Order: Special Victims Unit (2014–15, 2023).

Logue's film work includes roles in Sneakers (1992), Gettysburg (1993), Little Women (1994), Jerry Maguire (1996), Blade (1998), The Patriot (2000), American Splendor (2003), Zodiac (2007), The Cloverfield Paradox (2018), and Resident Evil: Welcome to Raccoon City (2021). He won the Sundance Film Festival's Special Jury Prize for his performance in The Tao of Steve (2000).

== Early life and education ==
Donal Francis Logue was born in Ottawa, Ontario to Irish parents from County Kerry. His parents were Carmelite missionaries, and the family moved from Ireland to Canada to Boston, Massachusetts and elsewhere before settling in Calexico, California in the state's Imperial Valley. There and in nearby El Centro, California, Logue grew up with three sisters—Karina, Deirdre and Eileen—and their mother taught at Calexico High School and Vincent Memorial Catholic High School. Logue attended Central Union High School in El Centro, where he became interested in theater. With friend John Everly during what Logue called the "summer during our sophomore year", he created the theater group Imperial Valley Players to perform in the school's auditorium, mounting the theater of the absurd play Picnic on the Battlefield by Fernando Arrabal.

For part of his junior year of high school, Logue attended the Jesuit school St Ignatius College in Enfield, London, England. In 1983, while a high-school senior, Donal was elected president of the 37th session of the American Legion Boys Nation, representing California and becoming the first non-citizen elected Boys Nation president. He went on to study history at Harvard University, graduating in 1988. In the late 1980s, he worked as a road manager for such bands as Bullet LaVolta.

== Career ==
After a few appearances in made-for-TV films, Logue appeared in the 1992 film Sneakers, playing Dr. Gunter Janek. Of his career beginnings Logue recalled,

After being accepted to Harvard as an intellectual history major and being convinced to audition for plays by my college roommates, I auditioned for 15 and didn't get called back for a single one. I had been a road manager for punk bands and a stage manager for a traveling theater company, but nothing had materialized. Out of the blue, though, I got a call to audition for the movie Sneakers out in L.A. and I had very little experience. When I was there auditioning for the role in front of Ben Kingsley and Robert Redford and getting nods of approval, it provided validation to my efforts. That was my first big movie, and I knew that my life would not be dictated by normality.

In 1993 he portrayed Capt. Ellis Spear in the film Gettysburg and a movie agent, Judd Bromell, in the Northern Exposure episode "Baby Blues". He next played an FBI agent in The X-Files episode "Squeeze". Logue's character Jimmy The Cab Driver was a staple of MTV promos in the early 1990s. He appeared in Blade (1998) and The Patriot (2000), as well as in two Edward Burns films, Purple Violets and The Groomsmen.

Logue's portrayal as the lead character in The Tao of Steve won him a Special Grand Jury Prize for best actor at the 2000 Sundance Film Festival. He was noticed by ER producer John Wells, who cast Logue in several episodes as Chuck Martin, a nurse whom Dr. Susan Lewis marries one weekend in Las Vegas on a whim and later has a child with. Concurrent with his run on ER, Logue starred in the critically acclaimed comedy Grounded for Life. In December 2005 Logue had a pilot development deal for a new situation comedy on ABC Television, originally titled I Want to Rob Mick Jagger. The pilot was picked up, and the series debuted in the winter of 2006 under the name The Knights of Prosperity. The show disappeared from the ABC lineup in early March 2007.

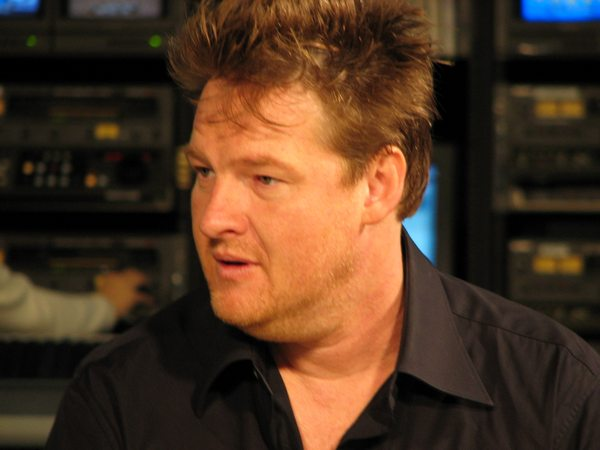
Logue in 2007

Logue had a supporting role in the film Just Like Heaven (2005). He had appeared as Phil Stubbs in the original pilot for the NBC show Ed but dropped out to star in the sitcom Grounded for Life. The first two-and-a-half seasons of Grounded for Life were telecast on the Fox network; the show moved to The WB for the remainder of its run. In 2002 and 2003 Logue appeared in three installments of the VH1 I Love... series: '80s, '70s, and '80s Strikes Back. In 2010 Logue appeared on House, M.D. as millionaire patient Curtis Harry.

Logue also starred in NBC's The Dennis in 2005, about a former child prodigy whose parents kick him out of the house and into the real world. It was not picked up, however. Logue co-starred with Nicolas Cage in the film Ghost Rider, the David Fincher film Zodiac, and alongside Mark Wahlberg in the 20th Century Fox film Max Payne. In 2007 he had an uncredited role in the Monk season 6 episode "Mr. Monk Is Up All Night" as a grifter whom Monk meets in a bar. In 2008 Logue appeared in the Jack Kerouac documentary One Fast Move or I'm Gone: Kerouac's Big Sur. Logue starred as Captain Kevin Tidwell in the NBC crime drama Life from 2008 to 2009. On May 4, 2009, NBC announced Life would not be returning for a third season.

Logue starred in the FX series Terriers, which ran for 13 episodes from September to December 2010. After the show's cancellation a frustrated Logue briefly left acting for truck-driving, according to his friend and fellow actor W. Earl Brown. Logue was featured as the main character in Theory of a Deadman's music video for the song "Lowlife", off their 2011 release The Truth Is....

In late 2012 Logue joined the casts of Sons of Anarchy, as renegade ex-U.S. Marshal Lee Toric who is out for revenge for the murder of his sister, and Vikings as King Horik. In 2013 he joined the cast of BBC America's Copper as a returning Union General turned Tammany Hall insider, General Brendan Donovan, and he returned to Sons of Anarchy and Vikings to reprise his roles from the previous seasons. Logue had roles in two 2013 films: CBGB with Alan Rickman and 9 Full Moons with Amy Seimetz and Bret Roberts.

Between March and May 2014 he appeared in six episodes of the NBC police procedural, crime, and legal drama Law & Order: Special Victims Unit as Lieutenant Declan Murphy, a former undercover officer appointed as acting commander of the Special Victims Unit. He portrayed Harvey Bullock in the police procedural series Gotham, based on the DC Comics Batman franchise, from 2014 until its conclusion in 2019.

In 2015 Logue appeared in Adam Massey's thriller film The Intruders.

In 2021 Logue appeared in the FX series What We Do in the Shadows, portraying a fictionalized version of himself. He is at first mistaken for his character Quinn from Blade but explains that he had chosen to become a vampire after completing the movie, as the vampire lifestyle appealed to him. This universe's version of Logue has become a respected member of the Supreme Worldwide Vampiric Council, is actively in touch with the cast members of Grounded for Life, and is an avid painter.

== Personal life ==
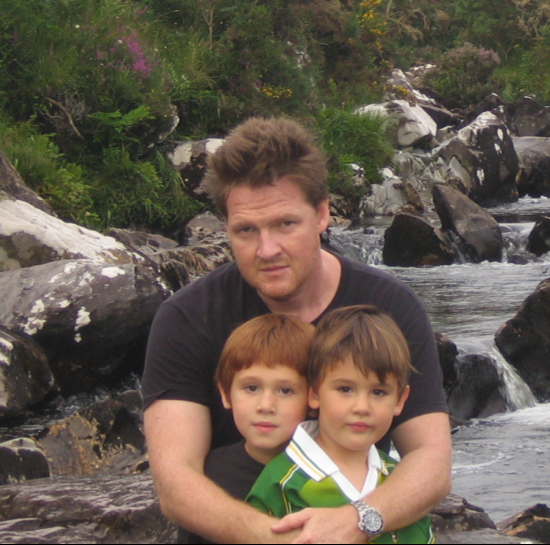
Logue with his children in Ireland in 2007

Logue travels back and forth to Killarney, Ireland, where his mother lives. He holds Canadian, Irish, and American citizenship.

Logue has homes in Los Angeles and in Shady Cove, Oregon, where he co-founded Frison Logue Hardwood. Logue regularly plays for the Los Angeles–based amateur soccer team Hollywood United.

Logue has a Class-A Commercial Driver's License and is licensed to drive tractor-trailers with double or triple trailers, tankers, and hazardous materials. He has a hardwood company with one partner called Frison-Logue Hardwood and a trucking company called Aisling Trucking with two partners based out of Central Point, Oregon, which the three founded in 2012.

Logue was formerly married to, or in a long-term committed relationship with, Kasey Walker, also known as Kasey Smith. They have a son named Finn and a transgender daughter, Jade. On June 27, 2017, Logue posted a tweet saying Jade had gone missing; he later deleted it and launched a wider public appeal for help after contacting police and the National Center for Missing and Exploited Children. By July 8, over a week later, Jade had been found in North Carolina and was returned home safely.

== Filmography ==
=== Film ===
| Year | Title | Role | Notes |
|---|---|---|---|
| 1991 | Medusa: Dare to be Truthful | Shane Pencil | |
| 1992 | Sneakers | Dr. Gunter Janek | |
| 1993 | Gettysburg | Capt. Ellis Spear | |
| 1994 | Disclosure | Chance Geer | |
| 1994 | Little Women | Jacob Mayer | |
| 1995 | Baja | Alex | |
| 1995 | Miami Rhapsody | Derek | |
| 1995 | 3 Ninjas Knuckle Up | Jimmy | |
| 1996 | Winterlude | Chris Hampson | Short film |
| 1996 | The Grave | Cletus | |
| 1996 | Eye for an Eye | Tony | |
| 1996 | Diabolique | Video Photographer #1 | |
| 1996 | Dear God | Webster | |
| 1996 | Jerry Maguire | Rick, Junior Agent | |
| 1997 | The Size of Watermelons | Gnome | |
| 1997 | Metro | Earl | |
| 1997 | Glam | Tom Stone | |
| 1997 | Men with Guns | Goldman | Also co-executive producer |
| 1997 | First Love, Last Rites | Red | |
| 1998 | Blade | Quinn | |
| 1998 | A Bright Shining Lie | Steven Burnett | |
| 1998 | The Thin Red Line | Marl | Uncredited |
| 1999 | Runaway Bride | Father Brian Norris | |
| 1999 | The Big Tease | Eamonn | |
| 2000 | The Tao of Steve | Dex | |
| 2000 | The Million Dollar Hotel | Charley Best | |
| 2000 | Reindeer Games | Pug | |
| 2000 | Steal This Movie | Stew Albert | |
| 2000 | Takedown | Alex Lowe | AKA Track Down |
| 2000 | The Opportunists | Pat Duffy | |
| 2000 | The Patriot | Dan Scott | |
| 2001 | The Château | Sonny | |
| 2002 | Comic Book Villains | Raymond McGillicudy | Also co-producer |
| 2003 | Confidence | Officer Lloyd Whitworth | |
| 2003 | American Splendor | Stage Actor Harvey | |
| 2003 | Two Days | Ray O'Connor | |
| 2005 | Tennis, Anyone...? | Danny Macklin | Also director, producer, and writer |
| 2005 | Just Like Heaven | Jack Houriskey | |
| 2006 | Jack's Law | Buzz | Uncredited |
| 2006 | The Groomsmen | Jimbo | |
| 2006 | The Reef | Troy (voice) | English language dub |
| 2006 | Citizen Duane | Uncle Bingo | |
| 2006 | Almost Heaven | Mark Brady | |
| 2006 | The Ex | Don Wollebin | |
| 2007 | The Good Life | Daryll | |
| 2007 | Ghost Rider | Mack | |
| 2007 | Zodiac | Ken Narlow | |
| 2007 | Purple Violets | Chazz Coleman | |
| 2008 | No Place Like Home | Uncle Eddie | Short film |
| 2008 | Max Payne | Alex Balder | |
| 2009 | The Lodger | Joe Bunting | |
| 2010 | Charlie St. Cloud | Tink Weatherbee | |
| 2011 | Shark Night 3D | Sheriff Greg Sabin | |
| 2011 | Oliver Sherman | Franklin Page | |
| 2012 | The Reef 2: High Tide | Troy / Thornton (voices) | English language dub |
| 2012 | Kill for Me | Garret Jones | |
| 2012 | Silent Night | Santa Jim Epstein | |
| 2013 | CBGB | Merv Ferguson | |
| 2015 | The Intruders | Jerry Halshford | |
| 2018 | The Cloverfield Paradox | Mark Stambler | |
| 2021 | Sometime Other Than Now | Sam | |
| 2021 | All My Puny Sorrows | Jake Von Riesen | |
| 2021 | Resident Evil: Welcome to Raccoon City | Chief Brian Irons | |
| 2023 | Door Mouse | Eddie | |
| 2024 | The Island Between Tides | Dad | |

=== Television ===
| Year | Title | Role | Notes |
|---|---|---|---|
| 1992 | The Commish | Ryan Gibson | Episode: "Video Vigilante" |
| 1993 | Almost Home | Tommy Tom | Episode: "Hot Ticket" |
| 1993 | The X-Files | Agent Tom Colton | Episode: "Squeeze" |
| 1993 | Northern Exposure | Judd Bromell | Episode: "Baby Blues" |
| 1993 | And the Band Played On | Bobbi Campbell | Television film |
| 1995 | Medicine Ball | Dr. Danny Macklin | Recurring role |
| 1996 | Public Morals | Ken Schuler | Recurring role |
| 1998 | Felicity | Eddie | Episode: "Friends" |
| 1999 | The Practice | Dickie Flood | 5 episodes |
| 2001–05 | Grounded for Life | Sean Finnerty | Main role |
| 2003–05 | ER | Chuck Martin | Recurring role |
| 2007 | The Knights of Prosperity | Eugene Gurkin | Recurring role |
| 2007 | Monk | Gully | Episode: "Mr. Monk Is Up All Night" |
| 2008–09 | Life | Captain Kevin Tidwell | 11 episodes |
| 2010 | Terriers | Hank Dolworth | 13 episodes |
| 2011 | House | Cyrus Harry | Episode: "Changes" |
| 2012 | Royal Pains | Ernie McGillicuddy | 2 episodes |
| 2012–13 | Sons of Anarchy | Lee Toric | 7 episodes |
| 2013 | Copper | General Brendan Donovan | 12 episodes |
| 2013–14 | Vikings | King Horik | 12 episodes |
| 2014–15, 2022 | Law & Order: Special Victims Unit | Lt./Capt. Declan Murphy | Recurring, seasons 15–17 & 23 |
| 2014–19 | Gotham | Harvey Bullock | Main role |
| 2019 | Stumptown | Private Detective Artie Banks | 2 episodes |
| 2020 | The Unicorn | Denny | Episode: "The Client" |
| 2020 | Dummy | Dan Harmon | 10 episodes |
| 2021 | Departure | Sheriff McCullogh | 6 episodes |
| 2021 | What We Do in the Shadows | Donal Logue | 2 episodes |
| 2022–23 | The Equalizer | Colton Fisk | 2 episodes |
| 2023 | Sisters | Jimmy | 2 episodes |
| 2025 | Duster | Sergeant Groomes | Recurring role |
| 2025 | Murdoch Mysteries | Detective Ronald Perle | "The Men Who Sold the World" |
| 2026 | Love Story | Ted Kennedy | 3 episodes |
| 2026 | CIA | Jonah LeRoux | Episode: "Orbital" |

== Awards and nominations ==
| Award | Year | Category | Work | Result |
|---|---|---|---|---|
| Ashland Independent Film Festival | 2005 | Best Actor | Tennis, Anyone...? | Won |
| Canadian Screen Award | 2013 | Best Actor in a Television Film or Miniseries | Sunshine Sketches of a Little Town | Nominated |
| Sundance Film Festival | 2000 | Special Jury Prize (for Outstanding Performance) | The Tao of Steve | Won |

== Published works ==
- Trejo, Danny; Logue, Donal (2021). Trejo: My Life of Crime, Redemption, and Hollywood. Simon and Schuster. ISBN 978-1982150822.
