= Michael Raymond-James =

American actor

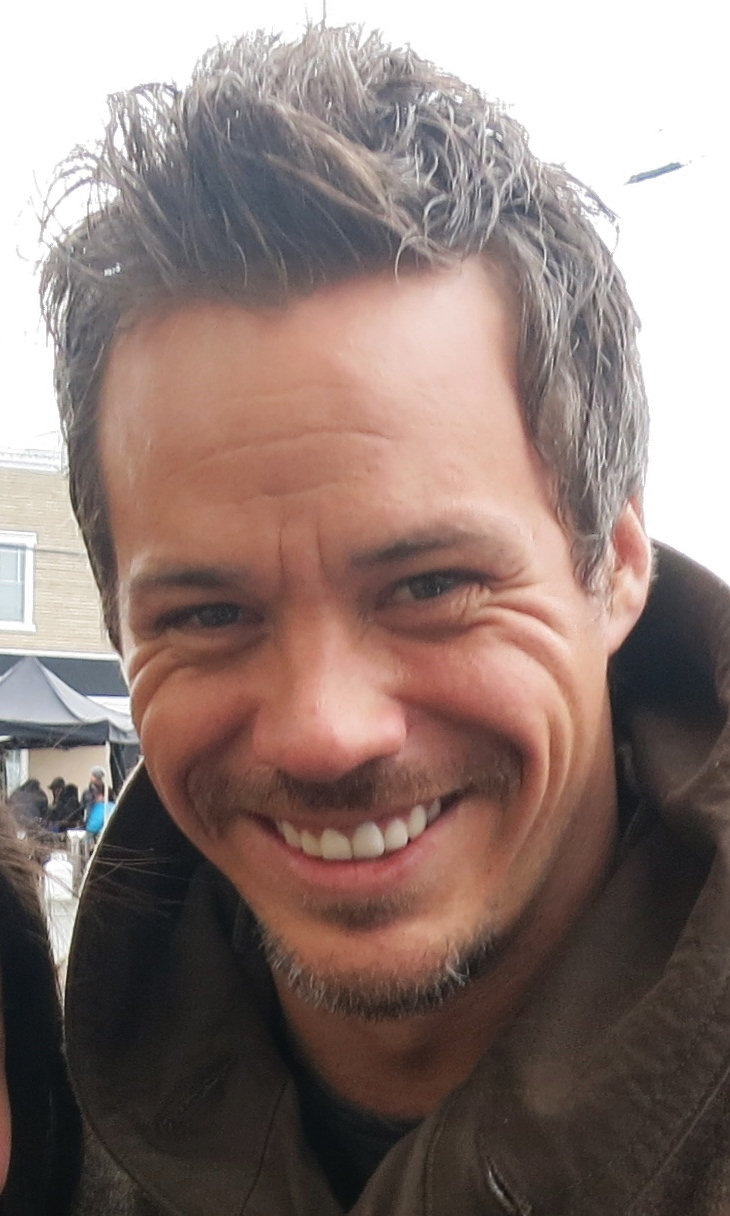
- Raymond-James in 2013.
- Born: Michael Weverstad; December 24, 1977 (age 48); Detroit, Michigan, U.S.
- Occupation: Actor
- Years active: 2000–present

Michael Raymond-James (born Michael Weverstad; December 24, 1977) is an American actor. He is best known for playing René Lenier in the first season of the HBO series True Blood, Britt Pollack on the FX series Terriers, Neal Cassidy / Baelfire on the ABC series Once Upon a Time, Mitch Longo on the CBS All Access series Tell Me a Story and Joseph Colombo in Godfather of Harlem.

== Early life and education ==
Raymond-James was born in Detroit, Michigan, and graduated from Clarkston High School in 1996, where he was a football and track standout. He started out doing theater and studied at the Lee Strasberg Theatre and Film Institute in New York, with George Loros, Geoffrey Horne and Robert Castle. Following several stage appearances in New York, including The Petrified Forest at the Pantheon Theater, he relocated to Los Angeles.

== Career ==
He has guest starred in such series as CSI: Crime Scene Investigation, Medium, Boston Legal, ER and the season two premiere of Lie to Me. He starred in the FX original series Terriers which was canceled by FX on December 6, 2010 after the first season. Raymond-James also played the role of Rene Lanier on the HBO original series True Blood.

In his feature debut Raymond-James played the best friend of Justin Timberlake's character in Black Snake Moan with Christina Ricci and Samuel Jackson. The actor also starred in Jonny Hirschbein's award-winning short film 'The Fix,' working alongside Robert Patrick and David Paymer. His feature-film credits include 'Moonlight Serenade,' starring as a piano prodigy opposite Academy Award-nominee Amy Adams.

In an episode of The Walking Dead titled "Nebraska", Raymond-James played a young man named Dave, who presents a threat to series protagonist Rick Grimes and his group.

He starred in Once Upon a Time as Neal Cassidy/Baelfire, who is Henry's father as well as Rumpelstiltskin's son and is later revealed to be the grandson of Peter Pan.

In 2020, Raymond-James was cast to play the lead role of Gavin Wolcott in the NBC apocalyptic drama pilot La Brea which was written by David Appelbaum; however, he left the project and was replaced by Eoin Macken. In the 2021-22 season he recurs on Law & Order: Organized Crime as Jon Kosta.

== Filmography ==
=== Film ===
Year	Title	Role	Notes
2000	Minor Blues	Dill	
2006	Black Snake Moan	Gill Morton	
2010	The Twenty	Unknown	
2011	Bowman	Mickey	Short film
2012	Jack Reacher	Linsky	
2014	Road to Paloma	Timmy "Irish" Murphy	
2014	The Salvation	Paul Delarue	
2016	The Finest Hours	A.B. Seaman D.A. Brown	
2017	Carter & June	Carter Jennings	
2021	Sweet Girl	FBI Detective John Rothman	
2021	American Insurrection	Gabe	
2022	The Integrity of Joseph Chambers	Lone Wolf	
TBA	Copperhead †	—N/a	Filming

=== Television ===
Year	Title	Role	Notes
2003	Line of Fire	Threat	Episode: "Take the Money and Run"
2003	The Handler	Mace	Episode: "Off the Edge"
2004	ER	Mr. Tunny	Episode: "Try Carter"
2004	North Shore	Damien Pruitt	Episode: "Meteor Shower"
2005	CSI: Crime Scene Investigation	Aaron Colite	Episode: "Unbearable"
2006	Boston Legal	Kevin Armus	Episode: "Ivan the Incorrigible"
2008–2011	True Blood	Rene Lenier	Main role (Season 1); Guest role (Season 3-4); 14 episodes
2009	ER		
2009	ER	Stuart Moore	Episode: "The Family Man"
2009	Cold Case	John "Shameless" Clark '76	Episode: "Jackals"
2009	Lie to Me	Gavin Howell	Episode: "The Core of It"
2009	Life	"Tex"	Episode: "Canyon Flowers"
2009	Last of the Ninth	Tommy "Babyface" Leone	Television film
2010	Saving Grace	Westy Stevenson	Episode: "Hear the Birds?"
2010	Terriers	Britt Pollack	13 episodes
2011	Law & Order: Special Victims Unit	Eddie Skinner	Episode: "Smoked"
2012	The Walking Dead	Dave	Episode: "Nebraska"
2015	Sons of Liberty	Paul Revere	TV miniseries
2012–2016	Once Upon a Time	Neal Cassidy / Baelfire	24 episodes
2016	Game of Silence	Gil Harris	10 Episodes
2016	Lethal Weapon	Chad Jackson	Episode: "Spilt Milk"
2018	Frontier	Fortunato	Main role
2018–2019	Tell Me a Story	Mitch Longo	Main role (Season 1)
2019–2020	Prodigal Son	Paul Lazar	Recurring role, 3 episodes
2019–2020	Billions	Jackie Connerty	3 episodes
2021	Big Sky	Blake Kleinsasser	4 episodes
2021	Law & Order: Organized Crime	Jon Kosta	Recurring role, 3 episodes
2022	See	Ranger	Main role (Season 3)
2023–present	Godfather of Harlem	Joseph Colombo	Recurring role (Season 3); Main role (Season 4)
2024	FBI: Most Wanted	Ethan McPherson	Recurring role, 3 episodes
