= Slightly Not Stoned Enough to Eat Breakfast Yet Stoopid =

Slightly Not Stoned Enough To Eat Breakfast Yet Stoopid

Studio album by Slightly Stoopid
- Released: July 22, 2008
- Recorded: Redondo Beach, California (2008)
- Length: 1:09:19
- Label: Stoopid Records

Slightly Stoopid chronology
| Chronchitis (2007) | Slightly Not Stoned Enough To Eat Breakfast Yet Stoopid (2008) | Top of the World (2012) |

Slightly Not Stoned Enough To Eat Breakfast Yet Stoopid is an album by California band Slightly Stoopid, which was released July 22, 2008. It contains all 7 tracks from the EP of the same name, "as well as other outtakes, rarities, and brand new studio joints."

While many of this album's tracks are originals, there are some tracks that are either covers or re-recordings. The track "Tom and Jerry" originally appeared as a hidden track in the group's previous album, Closer To The Sun. "Sensimilla" first appeared as a live track from their acoustic album, Acoustic Roots: Live & Direct. "Digital" first appeared on the group's Chronchitis. "I Know You Rider" is a traditional blues song, also covered by other artists such as The Grateful Dead. "I Would Do For You" is a cover of UB40. The album includes one hidden track: an alternate version of the title track from Closer To The Sun.

== Track listing ==
1. "Thinkin Bout Cops" - 2:43
2. "Circle House Blues" - 3:44
3. "Supernatural" - 5:14
4. "Chaunch" - 4:39
5. "I Would Do For You" - 3:48
6. "Fruits 'Legalize Them'" - 2:20
7. "Ain't No Reason to Go" - 1:54
8. "Sensimilla" - 3:00
9. "No Cocaine" - 4:47
10. "London Dub" - 2:45
11. "Shoobie" (featuring Toko Tasi) - 3:02
12. "On and On" - 3:13
13. "Train 1" - 2:45
14. "Train 2" - 1:56
15. "Know You Rider" - 3:07
16. "False Rhythms" - 3:52
17. "I Metal" (featuring I-Man) - 1:28
18. "She Bangs" - 2:01
19. "Digital" - 3:23
20. "Foreign Land" - 3:09
21. "Tom and Jerry" - 6:46

Note: Tom and Jerry's actual running time is 1:48. It is followed by 3 minutes of silence before playing a hidden track, a demo of "Closer to the Sun".

== Charts ==
| Chart (2008) | Peak position |
|---|---|
| US Billboard 200 | 73 |
| US Digital Albums (Billboard) | 19 |
| US Top Alternative Albums (Billboard) | 22 |
| US Independent Albums (Billboard) | 8 |
