= Winter Tour '05–'06 =

Winter Tour '05-'06

Live album by Slightly Stoopid
- Released: June 20, 2006
- Genre: Reggae; punk rock; hip hop; reggae fusion
- Label: Stoopid Records

Slightly Stoopid chronology
Closer to the Sun (2005)	Winter Tour '05-'06 (2006)	Chronchitis (2007)

Professional ratings
Review scores
Source	Rating
Allmusic	3.5/5 stars

Winter Tour '05–'06 is a live album by the band Slightly Stoopid that was released in 2006. A live DVD recorded in San Diego, CA on November 26 and 25, 2005 was also released to coincide with the album.

== Track listing ==
=== Disc 1 ===
1. "Intro"
2. "Bandelero"
3. "Everything You Need"
4. "Ese Loco"
5. "Wiseman"
6. "Jimi Baby"
7. "Dancing Mood"
8. "Basher"
9. "Johnny Law"
10. "'Till It Gets Wet"
11. "Mellow Mood"
12. "Prophet"
13. "Perfect Gentleman"

=== Disc 2 ===
1. "This Joint"
2. "Older"
3. "Runnin' With A Gun"
4. "Officer"
5. "Tribulation"
6. "Cool Down"
7. "Ain't Gotta Lotta Money"
8. "Encore (Slightly Stoopid Chant)"
9. "Closer to the Sun"
10. "Couldn't Get High/Untitled"
11. "Anti Socialistic"

== DVD track listing ==
1. "Intro"
2. "Bandelero"
3. "Everything You Need"
4. "Ese Loco"
5. "Wiseman"
6. "Jimi Baby"
7. "Johnny Law"
8. "Officer"
9. "Runnin' With A Gun"
10. "'Till It Gets Wet"
11. "Basher"
12. "Fireshot"
13. "She Bangs"
14. "Cool Down"
15. "Mellow Mood"
16. "Ain't Gotta Lotta Money"
17. "Couldn't Get High/Untitled"
18. "Stoned Saga"
19. "Collie Man"
20. "Anti Socialistic"
