= Meanwhile...Back at the Lab =

Studio album by Slightly Stoopid
- Released: June 29, 2015
- Length: 47:00
- Label: Stoopid Records

Slightly Stoopid chronology
Top of the World (2012)	Meanwhile...Back at the Lab (2015)

Professional ratings
Review scores
Source	Rating
AllMusic	3.5/5 stars

Meanwhile...Back at the Lab is the eighth studio album by American rock band Slightly Stoopid. It was released on June 29, 2015. "The Prophet" first appeared as a hidden track on their 1996 debut album Slightly $toopid.

== Track listing ==
1. "Dabbington" - 2:32
2. "This Version" - 3:59
3. "The Prophet" - 3:14
4. "Hold It Down" - 3:15
5. "Fades Away" - 3:10
6. "F**k You" (feat. Beardo) - 2:11
7. "Time Won't Wait" - 4:30
8. "Rolling Stone" - 3:59
9. "Guns in Paradise" - 3:38
10. "Come Around" - 3:44
11. "Call Me Crazy" - 2:42
12. "One Bright Day" (feat. Angela Hunte) - 3:11
13. "Life Rolls On" - 3:39
14. "What Your Friends Say" - 3:16

== Charts ==
Chart (2015)	Peak position
US Billboard 200	37
US Top Alternative Albums (Billboard)	3
US Digital Albums (Billboard)	13
US Independent Albums (Billboard)	3
US Top Rock Albums (Billboard)	5
US Top Tastemaker Albums (Billboard)	12
