= Top of the World (Slightly Stoopid album) =

Studio album by Slightly Stoopid
- Released: August 14, 2012

Slightly Stoopid chronology
Slightly Not Stoned Enough To Eat Breakfast Yet Stoopid (2008)	Top of the World (2012)	Meanwhile...Back at the Lab (2015)

Professional ratings
Review scores
Source	Rating
Allmusic	3.5/5 stars

Top of the World is the seventh studio album by American rock band Slightly Stoopid. It was released on August 14, 2012.

The seven-piece band continues to explore a variety of styles on the album, with help from some of their biggest influences and heroes including: reggae legends Barrington Levy and Don Carlos of Black Uhuru; “unofficial 8th member” Karl Denson of Greyboy Allstars; longtime band friend and touring partner G. Love; Fishbone frontman Angelo Moore; ex-Jurassic Five emcee extraordinaire Chali 2na; Dumpstaphunk’s Ian Neville; and hit-making singer/songwriter Angela Hunte.

The album entered the Billboard 200 at a career high No. 13 as well as on Billboard’s Independent Albums chart at No. 3. The album also debuted on Billboard’s Rock Albums and Alternative Albums charts with a final position of No. 4. The album has sold 75,000 copies in the US as of June 2015.

Following the album release, the band performed on the “Red Bull Sound Space at KROQ” (www.kroq.com/soundspace and www.redbullusa.com/soundspace) on August 23, followed by appearances on tastemaker indie music website Daytrotter and SiriusXM. The group also appeared on Jimmy Kimmel Live on September 12 to play their current single, “Top of the World.”

Slightly Stoopid unveiled the video for the album’s title track, starring comedian/actor/cult hero Tommy Chong, which can be viewed on VEVO.com.

Relix raved that Top of the World is "their most ambitious work yet." , and NPR Music stated that “If you like your hemp grown close to the beach, this is your soundtrack,” , while Yahoo! Music simply calls Top of the World “a sonic knockout.”

An extensive profile of the band in their hometown's San Diego Union-Tribune remarked that the album's "title seems almost prophetic for this eight-man band, whose dance-happy music blends elements of reggae, rock, blues, hip-hop and punk."

"Devil's Door" first appeared as a live track from their acoustic album, Acoustic Roots: Live & Direct.

== Track listing ==
1. "Top of the World" - 3:15
2. "Don't Stop" - 3:47
3. "Devil's Door" - 3:20
4. "Serious Man" - 3:27
5. "Way You Move" - 3:29
6. "Drink Professionally" - 3:13
7. "Ur Love" (featuring Barrington Levy) - 3:55
8. "We Don't Wanna Go" - 2:59
9. "Ska Diddy" (featuring Angelo Moore) - 2:09
10. "Just Thinking" (featuring Chali 2na) - 3:27
11. "Deal with Rhythm" - 2:34
12. "Pon Da Horizon" - 4:07
13. "Work" - 3:38
14. "Mona June" (featuring Angela Hunte) - 3:38
15. "Rhythm Streets" - 3:08
16. "Hiphoppablues" (featuring G. Love) - 2:31
17. "New Day" - 1:09
18. "Underneath the Pressure" - 2:21
19. "Marijuana" (featuring Don Carlos) - 3:33
20. "I'm on Fire" - 2:29 (Bruce Springsteen cover)
21. "Introduction to Organics" - 4:17 (contains Hidden Bonus Track)

== Charts ==
Chart (2012)	Peak position
US Billboard 200	13
US Top Alternative Albums (Billboard)	4
US Digital Albums (Billboard)	6
US Independent Albums (Billboard)	3
US Top Rock Albums (Billboard)	4
US Indie Store Album Sales (Billboard)	5
