= Seedless Clothing Co. =

American clothing company

Seedless Clothing is a clothing brand based in Ocean Beach, a neighborhood of San Diego, California. The company was founded in 1992 by Shea McComb (McAdams). It has since become a consulting firm for various bands, DJs, and events, most notably the High Times Cannabis Cup, and the Seedless 420 Party.

== Seedless 420 Party ==
The Seedless 420 Party, inaugurated in 2001, is an annual event that has included performances by entertainers like the Long Beach Dub Allstars (composed of the remaining members of Sublime), RZA, Methodman, Redman, Barrington Levy, Junior Reid, George Clinton, Slightly Stoopid, and Snoop Dogg. In 2008, the Seedless 420 Party featured a Miss Seedless contest, where staff writer Bobby Black of High Times participated as a guest judge. The eventual winner, Gina, went on to become High Times’ Miss September 2008.

== High Times Cannabis Cup ==
In 2013, Seedless Clothing assisted with the marketing of the first High Times Cannabis Cup to be held in Denver, Colorado. In addition, Seedless Clothing assisted with the marketing for the High Times Cannabis Cup held in Seattle, Washington.

== NFL cease and desist ==
In 2010, Seedless Clothing designed a t-shirt featuring a lightning bolt with the word "seedless" across the front. The NFL issued a cease and desist to Seedless Clothing to prevent them from selling the t-shirt in which the lightning bolt appeared. The company ceased production of the t-shirt to avoid litigation.
