= The Longest Barrel Ride =

Studio album by Slightly Stoopid
- Released: May 12, 1998
- Recorded: 1997
- Studio: Total Access Recording, Redondo Beach, California
- Genre: Reggae; punk rock
- Length: 58:36
- Label: Skunk
- Producer: Eddie Ashworth, Miguel Ashworth

Slightly Stoopid chronology
Slightly $toopid (1996)	The Longest Barrel Ride (1998)	Everything You Need (2003)

Professional ratings
Review scores
Source	Rating
AllMusic	2.5/5 stars

The Longest Barrel Ride is the second album by the band Slightly Stoopid, released by Skunk Records on May 12, 1998. This album incorporates various elements of reggae, punk, and ska. The track "Violence/FTP" contains a re-recording of "Fuck The Police" from their earlier album, Slightly $toopid. The track "To [sic] Little Too Late" is also featured on their acoustic LP, Acoustic Roots: Live & Direct.

The Longest Barrel Ride has two distinct medleys, one starting from "I'm So Stoned" and ending at "Crazy Riff", and another from "Violence/FTP" to "Metal Madness". The first medley has a calmer tone than the aggressive latter.

The song "Slightly Stoopid" contains a guitar riff version of "When The Saints Come Marching In". "Free Dub" contains two hidden tracks, the first being a cover of The Fugs' "I Couldn't Get High" and the second being a song entitled "Nico's." Both songs were later re-recorded on the album Acoustic Roots: Live & Direct.

== Track listing ==
No.	Title	Length
1.	"Castles of Sand"	3:56
2.	"Johnny Law"	1:38
3.	"Ese Loco"	2:27
4.	"Living Dread"	2:32
5.	"Don't Fuck 'n Look"	2:08
6.	"Hands of Time"	3:11
7.	"I'm So Stoned"	2:33
8.	"Sinking Stone"	1:43
9.	"Roots Rip"	1:22
10.	"Crazy Riff"	0:54
11.	"Running Away"	2:12
12.	"Struggler"	2:42
13.	"Slightly Stoopid"	3:38
14.	"Mr. Music"	3:32
15.	"Too Little Too Late"	3:43
16.	"Jedi"	2:11
17.	"Violence/FTP"	3:52
18.	"Just a Buzz"	1:25
19.	"Metal Madness"	3:09
20.	"Free Dub"	9:55
Total length:		58:36

== Credits ==
Slightly Stoopid

- Miles - vocals, guitar
- Kyle - bass, vocals
- Adam - drums

Other Credits

- Ikey Owens - keyboards on tracks 1, 6, 7, 9, 12, 14, 16, 20
- Miguel - background vocals on track 2, lead guitar on tracks 11, 18
- Rakan - vocals on track 6
- Z-Man - vocals on track 11
- Field Marshall - drums on tracks 12, 20
- Tim Wu - sax on tracks 15, 16
- Cover Art by Billy Albers
