= Bob Mendoza =

American baseball player

Biographical details
- Born: San Diego, California, U.S.

Playing career
- Position: Outfielder

Coaching career (HC unless noted)
- 1970–2000: Morse High School

Head coaching record
- Overall: Ranked No. 4 in the country in 1990 by USA Today
- Tournaments: 5 California Interscholastic Federation (CIF) section titles

Accomplishments and honors

Awards
- Breitbard Hall of Fame Coaching Legend; Dan Fukushima Lifetime Achievement Award; SDSU Rugby Player of the Year (1967)

Robert James Mendoza is an American former baseball player and a San Diego Hall of Champions inductee. After retiring from baseball, he continued his education and went on to teach, coach high school sports, and officiate in varsity basketball.

== Early life and education ==
Mendoza graduated in 1956 from Lincoln High School where he lettered nine times in three sports: football, baseball and basketball.

In 1958, he was named Player of the Year in Baseball and Most Valuable Conference Player of the Year in Baseball at San Diego City College. At San Diego State University, he was named the rugby team’s Player of the Year in 1967. After obtaining his Bachelor of Arts from San Diego State University, Mendoza played Rugby football for the Old Mission Beach Athletic Club (OMBAC). He later obtained his master's degree from the United States International University in San Diego.

== Coaching and sports career ==
In 1958, he was drafted as an outfielder by the Red Sox and his contract later sold to the San Francisco Giants. He left baseball to continue his education after playing 3 1/2 years for the Red Sox organization.

Mendoza went on to coach football, baseball and golf at Samuel F. B. Morse High School, as well as officiated over varsity basketball. All told, Mendoza coached football and baseball at Morse from 1970-2000. As the football team's defensive coordinator, he won five section banners. He also coached baseball at Mission Bay High.

In 1982, he coached Sam Horn, the No. 1 baseball draft in the country at the time. The same year, Mark McLemore, who Mendoza also coached, was drafted by the California Angels in the 9th round amateur draft. In 1990, Morse Tigers were ranked No. 4 in the country by USA Today.

Mendoza and three teammates were featured in the San Diego Union-Tribune as San Diego County’s first Little League team stars, six decades earlier, in 1949. The September 2009 story was on the heels of a county team making the World Series that year.

In the 1960s, he was a Triple A volleyball player in two-man, on-the-beach volleyball, teaming with Al Scates, current men’s head volleyball coach for UCLA. He played for an indoor volleyball league with the Wildcat Volleyball Club and was the league's archivist for many years.

He has been a regular winner of OMBAC's annual Over-the-line tournament.

== Awards ==
In November 2011, Mendoza was inducted into San Diego Hall of Champions’ Breitbard Hall of Fame as a Coaching Legend. In 2001, he was given the Dan Fukushima Lifetime Achievement Award by the California Coaches Association. While at Morse as assistant football coach, in 1996 he was presented with a coaching award by the High School Sports Association.

Mendoza was named a hall-of-famer by the Old Mission Beach Athletic Club in December 2022 for having played in more Over-the-line (OTL) tournaments than any other player in the history of the game, with his first tournament in 1957 through 2022, missing just two tournaments and winning six OTL championships and many second- and third-place finishes.

== Personal life ==
For 23 years, he and his wife Cordelia Mendoza, an antiquarian and appraiser, operated antique stores in Ocean Beach, California, including their last store, Cottage Antiques, which was named in 2010 on KGTV-10’s county-wide “A-List" for Best Antiques, placing first. He is the son of the late Benny Mendoza, a welterweight boxer in San Diego in the 1930s, and son-in-law of the late James M. Scott, who was a Senior Olympian. Mendoza lives with his wife in the Loma Portal neighborhood of Point Loma in San Diego.
