= Herbal Turkey Breast =

Studio album by Karl Denson
- Released: 1993
- Recorded: May 1993
- Studio: Indigo Ranch Studios (Malibu, California)
- Genre: Jazz
- Label: Minor Music

Karl Denson chronology
Blackened Red Snapper (1992)	Herbal Turkey Breast (1993)	Chunky Pecan Pie (1994)

Herbal Turkey Breast is an album by the American saxophonist Karl Denson, released in 1993. It is an album of acoustic jazz.

== Critical reception ==
Professional ratings
Review scores
Source	Rating
AllMusic	3/5 stars

AllMusic wrote that "Denson opts for an expanded musical palette, utilizing sax, trumpet, piano, bass, drums and percussion."

== Track listing ==
1. Dinosaurs (Denson) 7:53
2. "D" as in David (Denson) 6:53
3. Shuff Mountain (Denson) 6:28
4. Crown Jewels Suite (Denson) 16:49
5. Yusef 28 (Denson) 10:28
6. Goodbye Pork Pie Hat (Denson, Mingus) 2:51
