= Sam Horn =

American baseball player (born 1963)

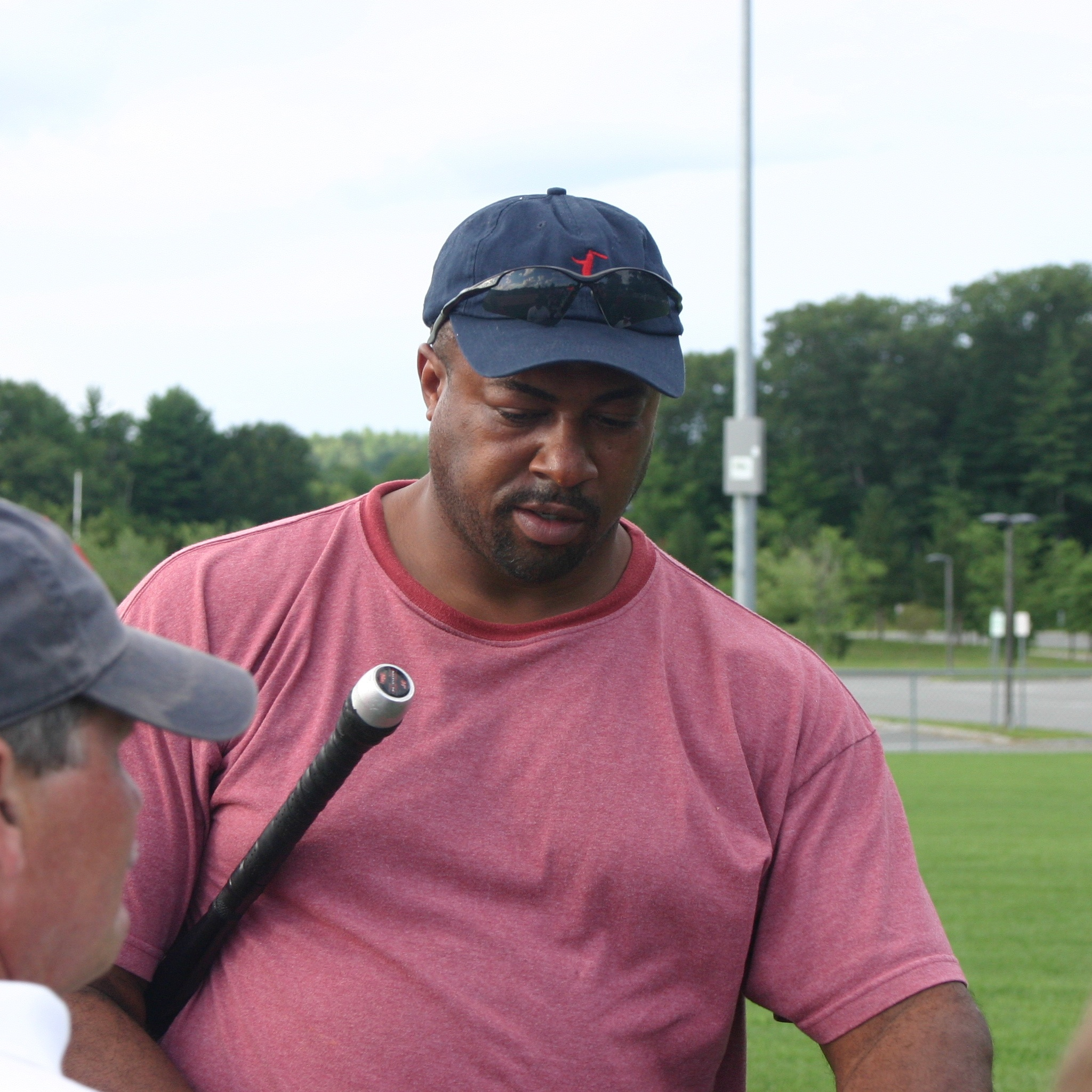
- Designated hitter / First baseman
- Born: November 2, 1963 (age 62); Dallas, Texas, U.S.
- Batted: Left Threw: Left

MLB debut
- July 25, 1987, for the Boston Red Sox

Last MLB appearance
- September 20, 1995, for the Texas Rangers

MLB statistics
- Batting average: .240
- Hits: 250
- Home runs: 62
- Runs batted in: 179
- Stats at Baseball Reference

Teams
- Boston Red Sox (1987–1989); Baltimore Orioles (1990–1992); Cleveland Indians (1993); Texas Rangers (1995)

Samuel Lee Horn (born November 2, 1963) is an American former professional baseball designated hitter and first baseman who spent parts of eight seasons in Major League Baseball (MLB) and was an anchor for New England Sports Network, the flagship station of Boston sports teams.

== Early years ==
Horn grew up in San Diego and went to Samuel F.B. Morse High School with Mark McLemore, where they were coached by Bob Mendoza, a San Diego Hall of Champions Coaching Legend inductee.

== Professional career ==
Horn was the 1982 first round draft pick (16th Pick) of the Boston Red Sox. In 1987, after batting .321, with 30 home runs, 82 runs batted in (RBI’s) and a league leading .649 slugging percentage for the Triple-A level Pawtucket Red Sox, Horn was called up to the Boston Red Sox mid-season. He continued to find success, hitting .278 with 14 home runs and 34 RBI’s in just 158 at-bats as a rookie with the major league Red Sox. During his eight-season major league career with Boston, Baltimore, Cleveland, and Texas, Horn hit .240, with a total of 62 home runs, including 23 home runs during the 1991 season as a member of the Baltimore Orioles. After leaving MLB, Horn played for the Taipei Gida in 1997 and 1998. He hit the first home run in the Taiwan Major League and held the record of being the highest paid player in the Taiwan professional baseball history (US$216,000 for the 1997 season) until surpassed by Chin-Feng Chen in 2006.

On April 6, 1992, he scored the first ever run at Camden Yards.

Horn’s most notable professional baseball “achievement” occurred on July 17, 1991 when he became only the fifth player in MLB history to strike out six times in a game (there have been two more occasions since). This occurred during a 15-inning game with the Kansas City Royals, after which teammate and former Cy Young Award winner Mike Flanagan famously told assembled media- including baseball historian Tim Kurkjian- that, “from now on, six [strikeouts] will be known as a ‘Horn’. Seven will be a ‘Horn-A-Plenty’. When you make history, you’ve got to put your name on it.” Baseball writer Paul Dickson has included the “Horn” in every version of The Dickson Baseball Dictionary since.

== New England Sports Network ==
Horn worked for New England Sports Network, providing analysis on Red Sox post-game shows. Horn's catch-phrase was ka-pow, which he exclaims whenever a Sox player hit a home run. The Red Sox fans' message board website called Sons of Sam Horn, which has also been used by Red Sox players (e.g. Curt Schilling) and management (e.g. John Henry), is named after Horn.

In July 2007, he declared his candidacy for President of Red Sox Nation. On August 15, 2007, a group calling themselves the "Fans of Sam Horn" took out an ad in USA Today, telling his fans to vote for him for President of Red Sox Nation.

== What is Your Pre-Game? ==
In August 2017, Horn debuted his TV show What is Your Pre-Game on NBC Sports Boston. Guests included Jackie Bradley Jr, Sam Kennedy, Walter McCarty, and other sports figures and CEOs. Horn's main goal is to show the public how they train, cope with stress, and fuel their bodies for success.
