= Mark McLemore =

American baseball player (born 1964)

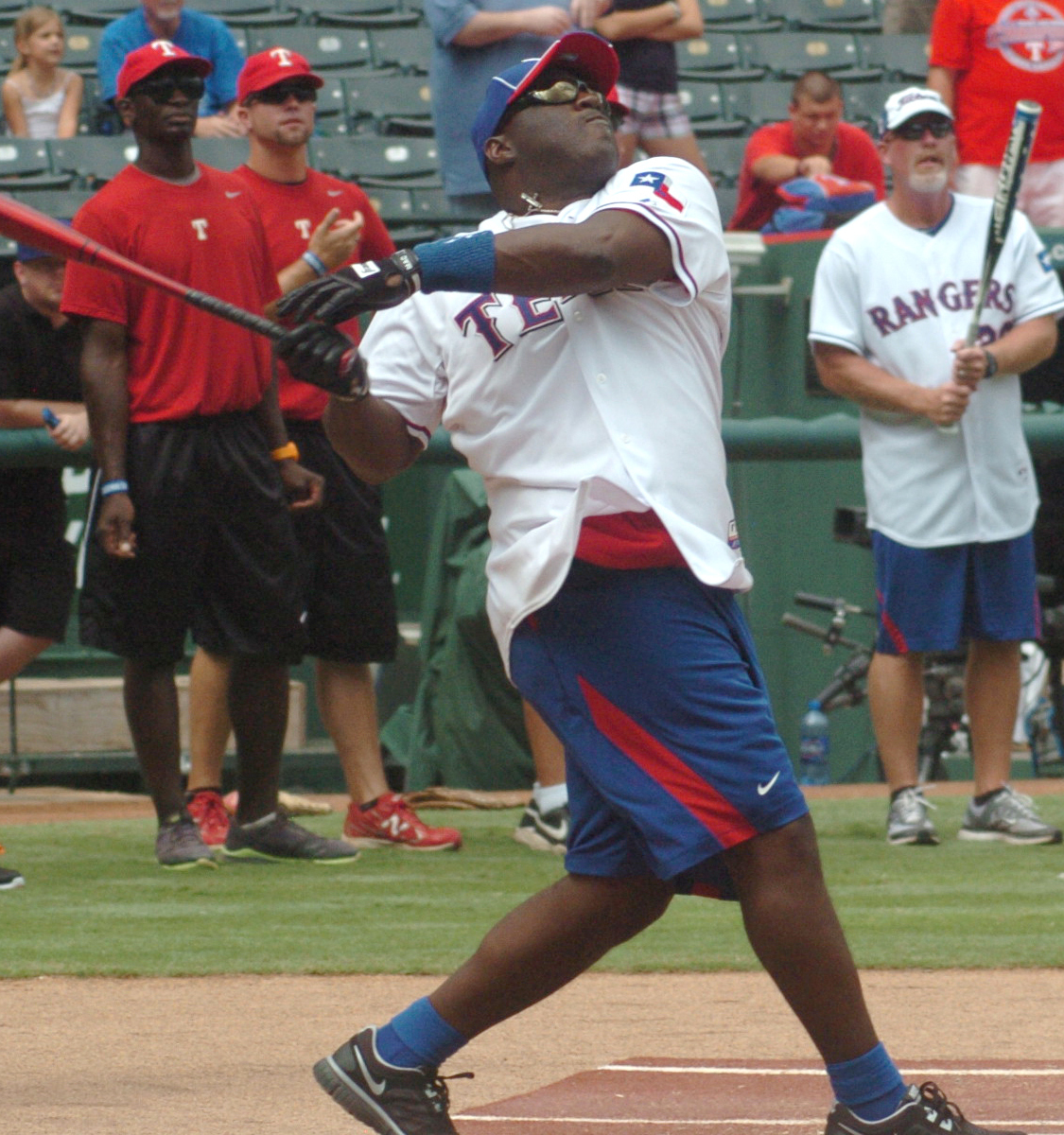
- McLemore in 2012
- Second baseman / Outfielder
- Born: October 4, 1964 (age 61); San Diego, California, U.S.
- Batted: Switch Threw: Right

MLB debut
- September 13, 1986, for the California Angels

Last MLB appearance
- October 2, 2004, for the Oakland Athletics

MLB statistics
- Batting average: .259
- Home runs: 53
- Runs batted in: 615
- Stats at Baseball Reference

Teams
- California Angels (1986–1990); Cleveland Indians (1990); Houston Astros (1991); Baltimore Orioles (1992–1994); Texas Rangers (1995–1999); Seattle Mariners (2000–2003); Oakland Athletics (2004)

Mark Tremell McLemore (born October 4, 1964) is an American former professional baseball second baseman and utility player who played for seven Major League Baseball (MLB) teams from 1986 to 2004, including all five teams currently in the American League West. He was named one of the 50 greatest Seattle Mariners players in 2026. After his playing career, he was a Texas Rangers broadcaster.

== Early life ==
McLemore grew up in Southeast San Diego, California. He attended Morse High School with future MLB player Sam Horn. They were coached by Bob Mendoza, a San Diego Hall of Champions coaching legend inductee.

McLemore was recruited heavily to play college football as a wide receiver and defensive back but opted to play professional baseball when selected in the 1982 MLB draft because baseball was his passion.

== Playing career ==
=== California Angels (1986–1990) ===
The California Angels selected McLemore in the ninth round of the 1982 MLB Draft. He was a minor league all-star in 1984 and 1985, being named the Texas League All-Star Game MVP in 1985. He made his MLB debut as a September call-up in 1986, batting 0-for-4. He was the team's Opening Day second baseman in 1987, getting his first MLB hit and run batted in that day with a single off Mark Langston of the Seattle Mariners. He started at second until the team traded for Johnny Ray in August, hitting .236 as a rookie. McLemore dealt with a nerve irritation in 1988 and was not a regular starter in his final three seasons in Anaheim.

=== Cleveland Indians (1990) and Houston Astros (1991) ===
California traded him to the Cleveland Indians on August 17, 1990, completing an earlier trade that sent Ron Tingley to the Angels. Cleveland released McLemore after the season. He signed with the Houston Astros in March 1991 but was released in June.

=== Baltimore Orioles (1992–1994) ===
McLemore signed with the Baltimore Orioles in July 1991 but did not return to the majors. He split the second base job with Billy Ripken in 1992. McLemore was released after the season, following Harold Reynolds signing with the team, later re-signing to a minor league contract.

After manager Johnny Oates saw him catching fly balls, McLemore converted to an outfielder in spring training in 1993. He tied for the team lead with 165 hits and had a career-high 72 runs batted in (RBI), primarily playing right field. He was named the American League (AL) Player of the Week for August 2–8 after batting .419 with two home runs in seven Orioles wins. He returned to second base in 1994, his final season in Baltimore.

=== Texas Rangers (1995–1999) ===
McLemore signed a two-year, $1.7 million contract with the Texas Rangers in December 1994, reuniting with manager Oates. He hit .404 in his first 27 games with Texas and was the only AL player to start 50 games in the infield and 50 games in the outfield during the season. He tore the rotator cuff in his right shoulder in late September, requiring offseason surgery. He returned to primarily a second base role in his final four seasons with Texas. In 1996, he led the Rangers with 27 stolen bases and had a career-best .290 batting average and 4.3 wins above replacement, according to Baseball Reference. His .472 batting average in June set a franchise monthly record and led the AL.

McLemore re-signed with the Rangers on a three-year, $6.5 million contract. He hurt his hand while base running on Opening Day in 1997, going on the injured list on May 14, also undergoing arthroscopic surgery on his knee. He returned to the Rangers on June 12 before returning to the injured list in late August, ending his season. He won the team's Jim Sundberg Community Achievement Award. In 1998, McLemore had a career-high 89 walks, batting .247, including batting .197 in the second half of the season. After the season, he needed another knee surgery, his third in 13 months. He also received the Harold McKinney Good Guy Award from the Dallas–Fort Worth chapter of the Baseball Writers' Association of America. In 1999, he had a career-high 105 runs scored.

=== Seattle Mariners (2000–2003) and Oakland Athletics (2004) ===
McLemore signed with the Mariners in December 1999. He was dubbed a "Supersub" for his contributions to the 2001–2003 Mariners. He was the club's regular second baseman during the 2000 season. In 2001, he was replaced by Bret Boone, who had been acquired during the offseason. After McLemore requested a trade after losing his job, manager Lou Piniella appeased him by using him regularly at several infield and outfield positions (mainly left field, third base, and shortstop, but also at second, center field, and right field), with remarkable results. During the 2001 Mariners' record-tying 116-win season, he had 409 at-bats, 117 hits, 69 walks, .286 batting average, .384 on-base percentage and 39 steals—all while playing without a regular position.

McLemore's statistics tailed off from his 2001 peak until he left the Mariners after 2003 as a free agent. He retired after one season with Oakland. By playing with Oakland, he became the first major leaguer to play for all five teams in the AL West since MLB divisions were realigned in 1994. (Gene Nelson also played for the four initial AL West teams, but his career ended in 1993, prior to realignment.) He is also one of many players to play for both of Texas' MLB franchises, the Rangers and Astros.

McLemore was named one of the 50 greatest Mariners players in August 2026. That September, the Mariners unveiled a statue featuring him and Mike Cameron, honoring the 2001 Mariners clinching the AL West title and carrying an American flag following the team's first game after the September 11th attacks.

== Post-playing career ==
McLemore worked for one year as a baseball broadcaster on ESPN. He was part of the Texas Rangers broadcast team, including providing analysis on the pre- and post-game programs on Bally Sports Southwest. He ended his tenure with the Rangers after the 2024 season. Previously, he also provided analysis on the Friday night Rangers broadcasts on KTXA with Gina Miller before those broadcasts ended after the 2014 season.

== Personal life ==
McLemore has six older siblings. He is married and has three children. He resides in the Dallas–Fort Worth metroplex. He owned car dealerships in the Dallas area.

McLemore's philanthropic work as a player included purchasing Rangers tickets for youth who lived in Fort Worth Housing Authority housing and purchasing Thansgiving dinners and school supplies.
