= Karl Denson =

American musician (born 1956)

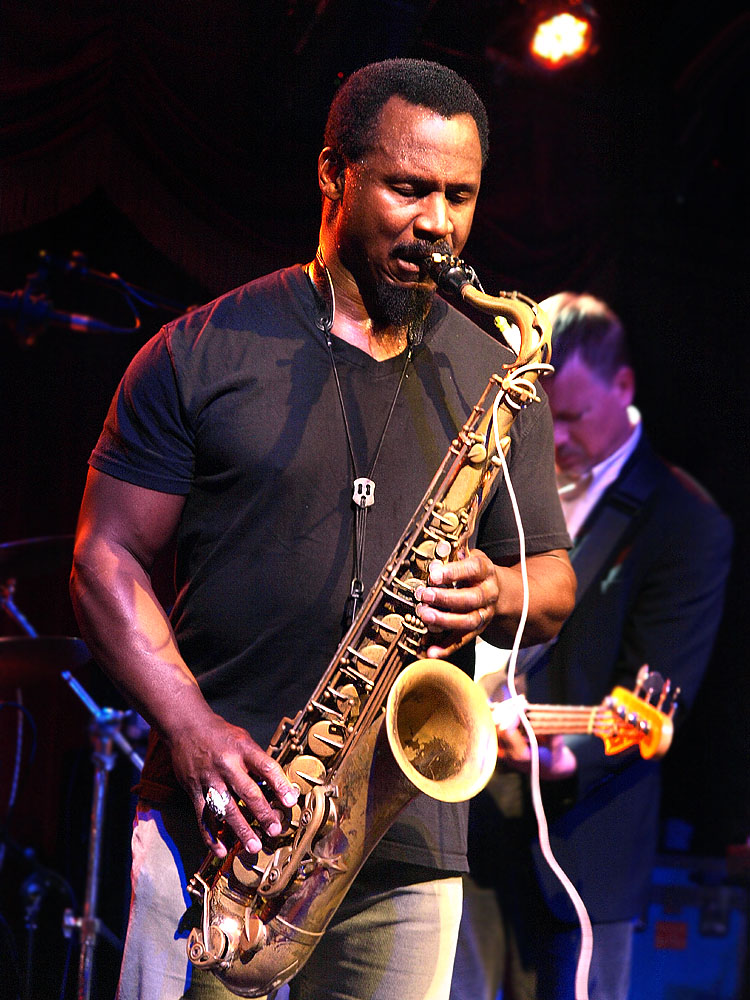
- Denson performing in 2010

Background information
- Born: December 27, 1956 (age 69)
- Origin: San Diego, California
- Genres: Jazz, funk, jam band
- Occupations: Musician, singer
- Instruments: Saxophone, flute, vocals

Karl Denson (born December 27, 1956) is an American funk and jazz saxophonist, flutist and vocalist from Santa Ana, California. He plays with the Rolling Stones, and leads his own group, Karl Denson's Tiny Universe (KDTU). He co-founded the Greyboy Allstars (GBA), and continues to tour with both KDTU and GBA as well as the Rolling Stones. Formerly, Denson was a member of Lenny Kravitz's band and he has recorded with artists including Jack DeJohnette, Dave Holland, Slightly Stoopid, Blind Boys of Alabama, Blackalicious, Stanton Moore, and Jon Foreman of the band Switchfoot. Denson appears in the 1988 movie Coming To America and in the 2021 sequel Coming 2 America as the saxophonist in the fictional band Sexual Chocolate.

Current members of KDTU include Denson (saxophone, flute, vocals, percussion), Ricio Fruge (trumpet, percussion), Ricky Giordano (guitar), Rashon Murph (keyboards), Parker McAllister (bass), Alfred Jordan (drums), and Danielle Barker (vocals).

== Selected discography ==
- Let Love Rule (Lenny Kravitz album) - (1989)
- Mama Said (Lenny Kravitz album) - (1991)
- Blackened Red Snapper (solo album) - (1992)
- Herbal Turkey Breast (solo album) - (1993)
- Chunky Pecan Pie (solo album) - (1994)
- West Coast Boogaloo (The Greyboy Allstars) - (1994)
- Baby Food (solo album) - (1995)
- A Town Called Earth (The Greyboy Allstars) - (1997)
- The D Stands for Diesel (solo album) - (1997)
- GBA Live (The Greyboy Allstars) - (1999)
- Dance Lesson #2 (solo album) - (2001)
- The Bridge (Karl Denson's Tiny Universe) - (2002)
- Flyin' the Koop (Stanton Moore) - (2002)
- Uberjam (John Scofield) - (2002)
- About Time (Steve Winwood) - (2003)
- Once You're There [EP] (Karl Denson's Tiny Universe) - (2006)
- What Happened to Television? (The Greyboy Allstars) - (2007)
- Lunar Orbit (Karl Denson Trio) - (2007)
- Brother's Keeper (Karl Denson's Tiny Universe) - (2009)
- Top of the World (Slightly Stoopid) - (2012)
- Inland Emperor (The Greyboy Allstars) - (2013)
- Time To Do Your Thing (Z-Bonics) - (2013)
- New Ammo (Karl Denson's Tiny Universe) - (2014)
- Sticky Fingers Live (The Rolling Stones) - (2015)
- Gnomes and Badgers (Karl Denson’s Tiny Universe) - (2019)
- Como De Allstars (The Greyboy Allstars) - (2020)

== Notes ==
- Interview at JamBase Retrieved August 26, 2007
- Greyboy Allstars at AllAboutJazz Retrieved August 26, 2007
- KD3 bio at JamBase
- Karl Denson at allmusic.com Retrieved January 29, 2009
- Interview with TheWaster.com Retrieved February 10, 2014
