= Everything You Need =

Studio album by Slightly Stoopid
- Released: March 18, 2003
- Recorded: 2002
- Label: Surfdog

Slightly Stoopid chronology
The Longest Barrel Ride (1998)	Everything You Need (2003)	Acoustic Roots: Live & Direct (2004)

Everything You Need is the third album by American band Slightly Stoopid. It was released by Surfdog Records on March 18, 2003.

== Track listing ==
No.	Title	Length
1.	"Everything You Need"	3:32
2.	"Officer"	3:51
3.	"Questionable"	2:06
4.	"Runnin' With A Gun"	3:30
5.	"Killin' Me Deep Inside"	4:53
6.	"Perfect Gentleman"	1:40
7.	"Wicked Rebel"	4:03
8.	"Sweet Honey"	3:50
9.	"Punk Rock Billy"	1:37
10.	"World Goes Round (Featuring I-Man)"	3:54
11.	"Wiseman"	3:20
12.	"Leaving on a Jetplane"	3:15
13.	"Mellow Mood (featuring G. Love)"	4:40
14.	"Collie Man"	2:13
Total length:		46:24

== Charts ==
Chart (2003)	Peak position
US Independent Albums (Billboard)	20
