= David Charles Collier =

American lawyer

David Charles "D.C." Collier
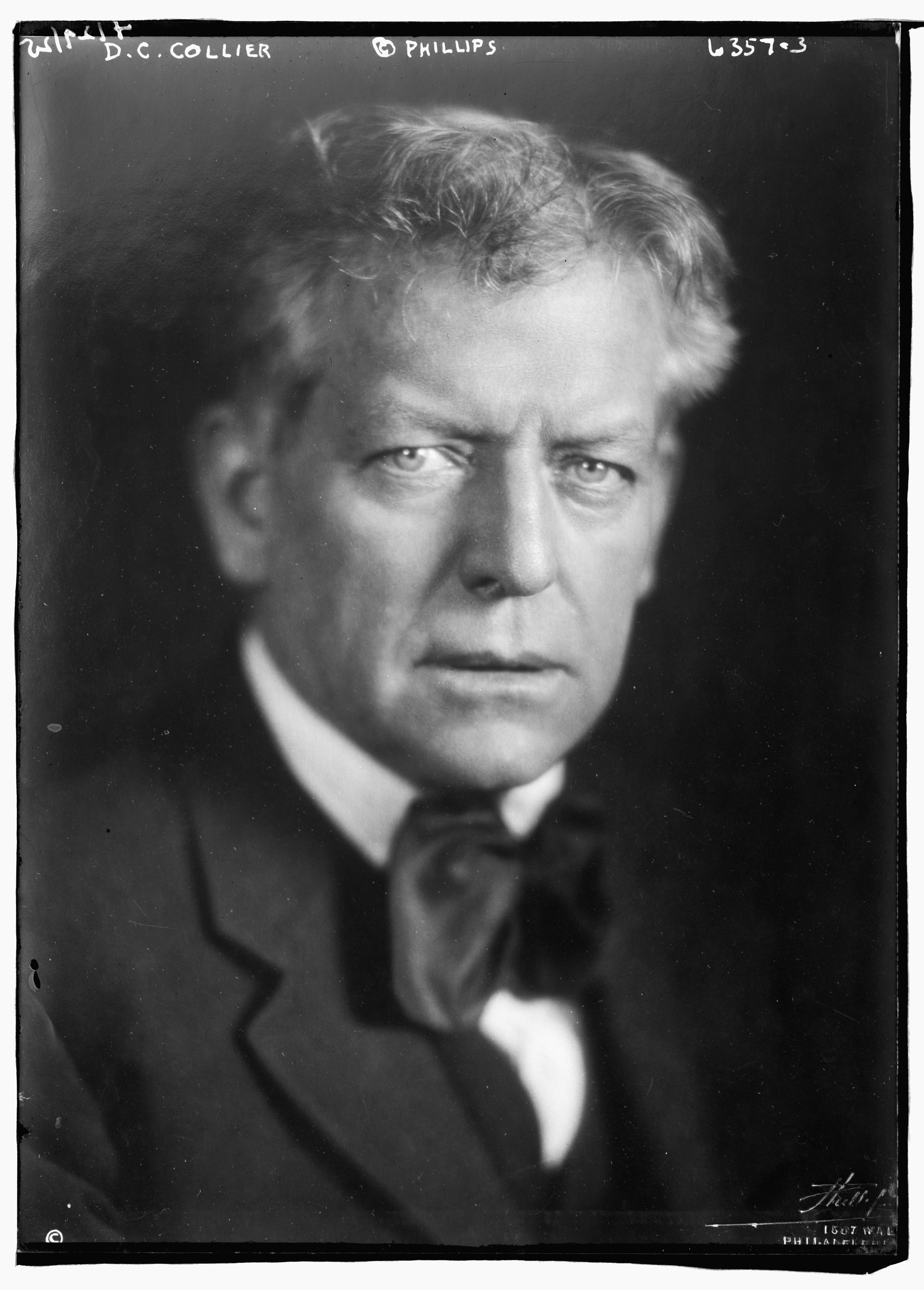
- Born: August 14, 1871; Central City, Colorado, U.S.
- Died: November 13, 1934 (aged 63); San Diego, California, U.S.
- Occupations: Lawyer, real estate developer
- Known for: Director of 1915-16 Expo in San Diego; developer of many areas of San Diego

David Charles Collier, commonly known as D. C. Collier or as "Charlie" and sometimes given the honorary title of "Colonel", was an American real estate developer, civic leader, and philanthropist in San Diego, California, during the early years of the 20th century. He is best known as the organizer and director of San Diego's Panama–California Exposition (1915–16). He was also a prime developer of several areas of San Diego as well as La Mesa and Ramona. In his day he was described as "San Diego's foremost citizen."

== Early life ==
Collier was born on August 14, 1871, in Central City, Colorado. His parents were David Charles Collier, an attorney, judge, and journalist, and Martha Maria (Johnson) Collier. The younger David Charles Collier was generally called "Charlie". He moved to San Diego with his family in 1884, when he was 12 years old. He and his family often picnicked or camped on the beach in the then-undeveloped neighborhood of Ocean Beach. He attended Russ High School (now San Diego High School) and later worked as a janitor and a bookkeeper. At age 16, he bought property in Ocean Beach, at "Alligator Rock" (now Ocean Front St. at Bacon and Coronado streets) and built a hut there. He gradually expanded the hut into a large house with a bathing pool and a Japanese garden, where he lived for decades. By age 20, he was working as a lawyer in his father's office.

== Family ==
He married Ella May Copley, the sister of Congressman Ira C. Copley, on January 1, 1896; they divorced in 1914. They had two sons, David Copley Collier and Ira Clifton Collier. David became a military aviator and was killed in a crash during World War I. Ira moved to New York City and became a newspaperman. D. C. Collier married his second wife, Ruth E. Everson, on November 14, 1915. Following her death in 1916, he married Clytie B. Lyon on December 13, 1919.

== Career ==
After his father's death in 1899 he went into law practice with Judge W. P. Andrews and later with Sam F. Smith. Many of his clients paid him in real estate instead of cash, often unloading undeveloped parcels that they considered worthless. So he spent more and more of his time in real estate development under various names: Ralston Realty Company in 1904, Easton Collier Company in 1905, Western Investment Company in 1908, and D. C. Collier and Company in 1909. He subdivided the land, put in utilities, planted trees, and sold lots in many neighborhoods, including Ocean Beach, Point Loma, Pacific Beach, University Heights, Normal Heights, North Park, East San Diego, and Encanto. He built a railroad line to Ocean Beach in 1909, greatly hastening development there, and is considered by some to be the "true father of Ocean Beach".

He also bought property in Ramona including five gold mines, and built a country home there on a 240-acre ranch. He also owned a home and poultry farm in La Mesa (then called La Mesa Springs), and built the city's first springhouse to bottle and sell water.

As his business prospered he took a leading role in civic affairs, influencing the city's decision about where to purchase water, persuading Glenn H. Curtiss to bring his fledgling aviation company to North Island in Coronado, and helping the city of San Diego gain possession of its tidelands from the state. He served as president of the San Diego Chamber of Commerce. He served on the staff of California governor James Gillett from 1907 to 1911. It was Gillett who gave him the courtesy title of "Colonel," which stuck with him for the rest of his life. He was a flamboyant dresser and a conspicuous consumer, owning the first phonograph and the first automobile in San Diego.

== Philanthropy ==
His philanthropy was generous and widespread, particularly involving the donation of land for public purposes. He built Ocean Beach Elementary School, a two-room schoolhouse, and donated 60 acres of land in Ocean Beach "for the children". Eventual uses of that land included three parks, all originally named Collier Park: William Cleator Park, Dusty Rhodes Park, and a neighborhood park still named for Collier. Other portions of the parcel became a junior high school (originally Collier Junior High, now Correia Middle School), a YMCA facility, a church, and Nimitz Boulevard. He also contributed to the development of a park in La Mesa that still bears his name. He donated 10 acres of land in Ramona, which became the first county park in San Diego County.

== California-Panama Exposition ==
When the city of San Diego began to consider holding an exposition to celebrate the opening of the Panama Canal—and to highlight San Diego's position as the closest American port to that canal—Collier became the prime mover. He served as Director General of the Panama-California Exposition from 1909 to 1912 and president of the Exposition from 1912 to 1914. Collier chose the central mesa of Balboa Park as the site, selected California Mission as the architectural style, and hired Bertram Goodhue to be the consulting architect. He also chose "human progress" to be the exposition's cultural theme. The theme exhibit, particularly focused on the anthropology of the Southwestern United States, later became the San Diego Museum of Man, of which he was a founder.

He served without pay, paid his own travel expenses to Sacramento and Washington to lobby for the Exposition, and donated $500,000 to the Exposition. By 1914 his business was suffering so badly that he had to resign as president and go back to practicing law and selling real estate. He remained active with the Exposition, serving as a public relations commissioner. As a trustee of the defunct Wonderland Amusement Park in Ocean Beach, he arranged to sell its exotic animals to the fledgling San Diego Zoo.

== Later career ==
He ran unsuccessfully for city council (1917) and for county supervisor (1932). He continued his development activities, particularly in Ocean Beach and Point Loma. Between 1918 and 1930 he took a variety of positions in Chicago, Philadelphia, and New York City, including several positions directing major expositions. In 1930 he resumed the practice of law in San Diego. He died of a heart attack on November 13, 1934; his estate proved to be close to bankruptcy. Since he was a Freemason, he was buried in a Masonic section of Mount Hope Cemetery.

== Recognition ==
A plaque honoring him was installed in the California Quadrangle area of Balboa Park in 1936 during the second San Diego exposition, the California Pacific International Exposition, which used the same Balboa Park site and many of the buildings from the first exposition.

Collier Neighborhood Park in Ocean Beach, Collier Park in La Mesa, and Collier County Park in Ramona are all named for him.
