= Hodad's =

Local hamburger restaurant chain in San Diego

Coordinates: 32.7488°N 117.2522°W

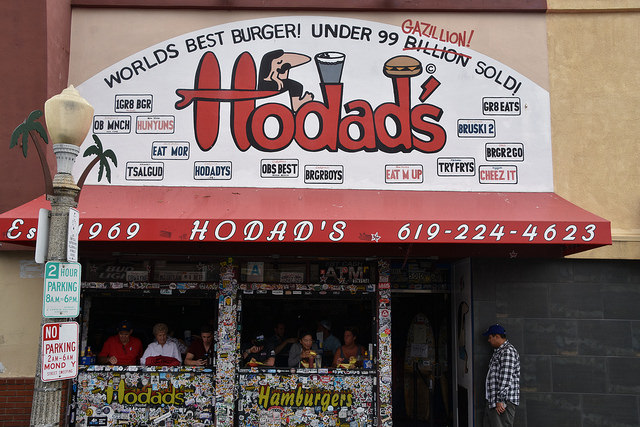
- Interactive map of Hodad's

Restaurant information
- Established: 1973
- Previous owners: Byron and Virginia Hardin; Mike Hardin
- Food type: Hamburgers
- Location: Newport Avenue, San Diego, California
- Other locations: Downtown San Diego; Petco Park
- Website: hodadies.com

Hodad's is a small chain of hamburger restaurants in San Diego, California, established in 1969 by husband and wife Byron and Virginia Hardin.

Following the death of Byron in 1984, his son Mike Hardin assumed operating responsibilities. He took over the management following the death of Virginia in 1989. Hardin moved the restaurant to its current location on Newport Avenue in Ocean Beach, later opening additional restaurants in Petco Park and on the corner of 10th Avenue and Broadway. Mike died in 2015, leaving the business to his children Shane and Lexi.

Hodad's has received positive reception for its burgers, especially its bacon cheeseburger. It was featured on Guy Fieri's TV show Diners, Drive-ins and Dives. Since appearing on the show, the restaurant has enjoyed a large increase in sales, often selling thousands of burgers daily. It has also been included on multiple "best of" lists, including CNN's nationwide list of "Five tasty burger joints worth visiting" in 2009 and in 2015 on Foursquare's top 50 "best burger joints in America".

== History ==
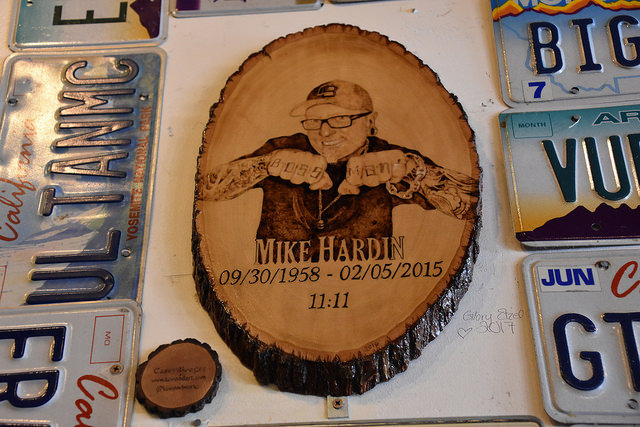
A photograph of a woodcut memorial portrait of late Hodad's owner Mike Hardin. Surrounding it are license plates donated to the business.

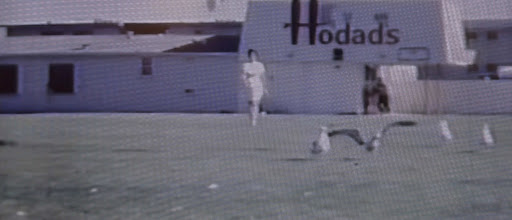
Vivian Costley at Hodads 1969

Husband and wife Byron and Virginia Hardin originally ran a restaurant in 1969 called Hardin's Hamburgers, in El Cajon. In 1969, they purchased a burger stand in Ocean Beach, San Diego for $600 (equivalent to $4,352 in 2025) and called it Hodad's, the name originating as a surfing term for a non-surfer who pretends to be one. That original Hodad's was managed by William and Vivian Costley. The restaurant moved to a larger venue on Voltaire Street in 1979 after the previous landlord doubled the rent, at which point the business started to see increased turnover and success. Hodad's moved to its current location on Newport Avenue in 1991, taking just four days to open. The restaurant expanded into a second location in downtown San Diego on the corner of Broadway in 2011, named "Hodad's Too" and approximately twice the size as their other outlet. Hodad's began selling its products in Petco Park after signing a partnership with the San Diego Padres. To celebrate this partnership, Mike Hardin threw the first pitch at the July 5, 2012 Padres game versus the Cincinnati Reds.

As of 2015, the restaurant estimated that it sells between 1,200 and 1,500 hamburgers daily. Hodad's is popular among both tourists and locals, with queues at times taking hours to get through.

In 2018, Hodad's established their brewing arm, Hodad's Brewing Company, with four inaugural beers. These included The Boss Brew, a German-style Kolsch light beer, The Hodady Hefeweizen, The local IPA, and Throwback Brown.

=== Management ===
From its inception in 1969 until 1984, the restaurant was co-owned by Byron and Virginia Hardin. Their son, Mike Hardin, became co-owner when his father died in 1984. He assumed greater responsibility with business partner Terry Rhodes when Virginia died in 1989. Mike Hardin was called a local icon by Discover San Diego and the San Diego Union-Tribune. Mike Hardin died on February 5, 2015, having suffered a heart attack and a makeshift memorial for him was created by the community in front of the Ocean Beach restaurant. The restaurant closed during February 6 and 7 to honor both him and another employee, and was reopened on February 9. Hundreds of people attended a public memorial ceremony in late March at the Petco's Park location, including Guy Fieri. His son Shane and daughter Lexi became co-owners of the restaurant chain in 2015. In an interview with SD News, Shane discussed the pressures of taking over the business as well as both modeling his behavior after his father and establishing his own identity as its owner.

== Menu ==
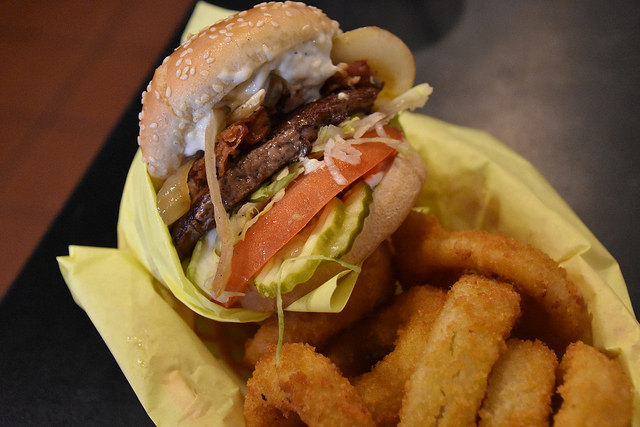
The Blue Jay burger and onion rings.

Hodad's is known for its bacon cheeseburgers, fries, onion rings, and giant milkshakes. At the original beach location, Hodad's served burgers for 25 cents (equivalent to $2 in 2025), with burger prices ranging from $4.25 to $8.25 by 2015. When Mike Hardin took over the business, he began to create burgers with large portions and in 2013, created the Guido Burger, inspired by Guy Fieri and his nickname 'Guido,' who featured Hodad's on his show, Diners, Drive-Ins and Dives. Another burger is the Blue Jay, a bacon cheeseburger with blue cheese and grilled onions. Hodad's bacon patties are of a similar consistency to that of a hash brown.

== Decor ==
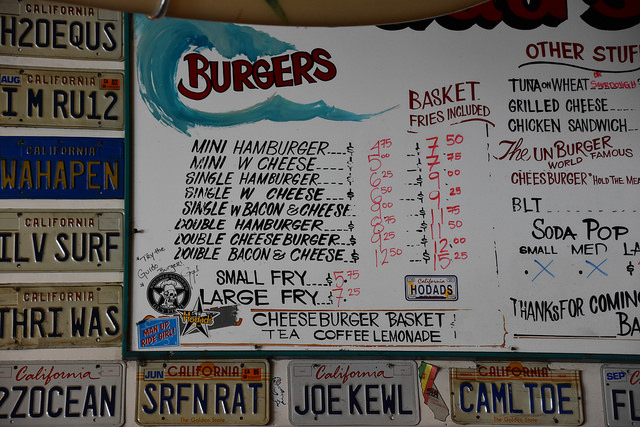
A wall of the restaurant. It shows several license plates donated by people as well as its menu.

Hodad's walls are decorated with numerous license plates, while stickers can be found at both Newport Avenue and 10th Avenue locations. Mike Hardin had previously said that everything in the Ocean Beach location is provided by customers. Other decor at Hodad's Too includes skateboards and surfboards on the wall as well as a surfboard table. Its style has been described as beach-like and biker-chic.

== Reception ==
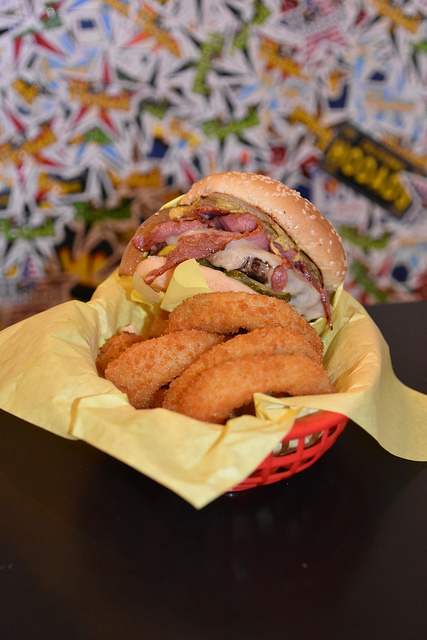
Guido Burger and onion rings, named after Guy Fieri

Hodad's has received positive reception for its burgers and style. It appeared on an episode of "The Best Thing I Ever Ate" on the TV channel Food Network. The restaurant's bacon cheeseburger has been lauded by Guy Fieri, and in 2009 CNN included it on a list of "Five tasty burger joints worth visiting." Hodad's was featured in one of San Diego Magazine's "Everyday Eats" articles, which covers budget food options. In 2015 Foursquare ranked the restaurant 26th on its list of 50 "best burger joints in America." In an article by Hoodline, Hodad's burgers ranked number 3 out of 50 for quality burgers under $10. The San Diego Union-Tribune included it in its list of the 30 best burgers in San Diego. Times of San Diego's Hoa Quach included it in a list of restaurants to celebrate Father's Day in San Diego.

Serious Eats writer Erin Jackson gave it a positive review due to its bacon cheeseburger. The Daily Meal included it in its top 50 list of the best french fries in the U.S. Houston Press writer Robb Walsh argued that the burger was not actually the best in the country. San Diego Reader's Ian Pike included its burgers in his list of the most overrated burgers in San Diego, suggesting praise for them came from the sunk cost fallacy, although was more positive about their milkshakes.
