= Wonderland Amusement Park (San Diego) =

Amusement park in Ocean Beach, California (1913–1916)

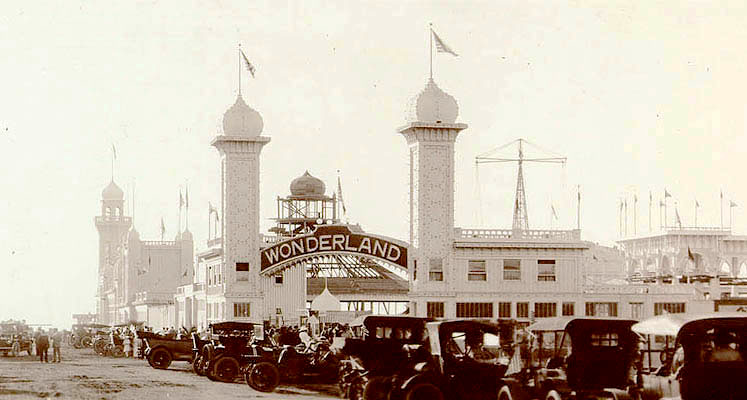
- Entrance of the park (1913)
- Location: Ocean Beach, San Diego, California
- Status: Defunct
- Opened: July 14, 1913
- Closed: January 1916
- Owner: Herbert P. Snow
- General manager: Bert Snow

Wonderland was a beachfront amusement park in the Ocean Beach neighborhood of San Diego, California, which operated from 1913 to 1916. It was the first amusement park in San Diego.

The 8-acre (3.2 ha) amusement park was built on or near the Pacific Ocean beach by the Ocean Bay Beach Amusement Center, owned by Herbert P. Snow and managed by Bert Snow. It opened on July 4, 1913 to a crowd of more than 20,000. It featured the largest roller coaster on the West Coast, called the Blue Streak Racer, as well as a carousel, water slide, and carnival games. A menagerie featured "lions, bears, leopards, wolves, mountain lions, a hyena, and 56 varieties of monkeys". Additional amusements were a dance hall, bowling alley, roller skating rink, and salt-water bathing plunge. There were 22,000 tungsten lights which illuminated the park and by the entrance gate with its towering minarets.

The amusement park helped to put the community of Ocean Beach on the map for San Diegans. The formerly 2 1/2-hour trip to the beach from central San Diego was reduced to a 40-minute trolley ride in 1909 by the construction of the Point Loma Railroad by developer D. C. Collier.

The park thrived for two seasons but saw a massive drop-off in attendance in 1915 due to the opening of the Panama–California Exposition in nearby Balboa Park. Wonderland fell into foreclosure and was sold at auction in March 1915. In January 1916, storm tides undermined the roller coaster, which had to be closed. It was dismantled and eventually shipped to Santa Monica's Pleasure Pier. The rest of the park was also destroyed by winter storms and was eventually demolished. The menagerie was rented to the Panama–California Exposition in Balboa Park during its run (1915–1916), and the animals were later sold to the fledgling San Diego Zoo.

== Legacy ==
A KPBS-TV public television series about the history and neighborhoods of San Diego is called Wonderland after the amusement park.

In 2013, to mark the 100th anniversary of the opening of the amusement park, the annual Ocean Beach Street Fair featured a "Wonderland" theme, and a restaurant called "Wonderland" opened in Ocean Beach, with decor focusing on local history.
