= Slightly Stoopid (album) =

Slightly $toopid

Studio album by Slightly Stoopid
- Released: 1996
- Length: 45:15
- Label: Skunk
- Producer: Michael "Miguel" Happoldt, Bradley Nowell

Slightly Stoopid chronology
| Slightly $toopid (1996) | The Longest Barrel Ride (1998) |

Slightly $toopid is the first full-length album by Slightly Stoopid and was released in 1996 on Skunk Records. On the original 1996 Skunk Records print, the CD included two hidden tracks after "To a Party." The first hidden song is "Prophet" with the late Bradley Nowell of Sublime playing bass. The second hidden song is "Marley Medley" which contains "Guava Jelly" and "This Train," both Bob Marley covers. The printing was very limited at an estimated 1000 copies.

Since the original prints were made before Slightly Stoopid were well known, they are rare and hard to come by. Original prints used to sell on eBay consistently at around $300 because of its out of print status and the demand for the hidden track with Bradley Nowell. It was out of print for 10 years and in 2006 was re-released together with their second album Longest Barrel Ride as a double album. Both albums were out of print.

== Track listing ==
| No. | Title | Length |
|---|---|---|
| 1. | "Righteous Man" | 2:34 |
| 2. | "Operation" | 1:55 |
| 3. | "Hey Stoopid" (live) | 2:49 |
| 4. | "Civil Oppression Dub" | 1:54 |
| 5. | "Zero Tolerance" | 1:38 |
| 6. | "Alibi's" | 2:43 |
| 7. | "Anti Socialistic" | 2:36 |
| 8. | "Opportunities" | 2:23 |
| 9. | "Smoke Rasta Dub" | 2:40 |
| 10. | "Stop" | 2:53 |
| 11. | "Wake Up Late" | 1:30 |
| 12. | "Fuck the Police" | 2:08 |
| 13. | "American Man" | 2:03 |
| 14. | "To a Party" | 15:38 |
| Total length: | | 45:15 |

- "To a Party" contains two hidden tracks - "Prophet" and "Marley Medley" (a Bradley Nowell compilation of two Bob Marley songs: "Guava Jelly" and "This Train").

== Credits ==
Slightly Stoopid

- Miles Doughty - guitar, vocals
- Kyle McDonald - bass, background vocals, and SH-101
- Adam Bausch - drums

Additional musicians

- Background vocals on "Operation" - Ras-1
- Bass and production on the hidden track "Prophet" - Bradley Nowell

Production

- Produced by Miguel at Fake Niteclub L.B.
- Cover art by Opie Ortiz
