= Chronchitis =

Studio album by Slightly Stoopid
- Released: August 7, 2007
- Recorded: Total Access Recording, Redondo Beach, California; Wire Recording, Austin, Texas; Kingsize Soundlabs, Eagle Rock, California; Philadelphonic Studio, Philadelphia
- Genres: Reggae; rocksteady; dub
- Length: 64:49
- Labels: Controlled Substance Sound Labs; Powerslave Records (Japan) Stoopid Records
- Producers: Miguel, Paul Leary, Mario C., Chris DiBeneditto

Slightly Stoopid chronology
Winter Tour '05-'06 Live CD/DVD (2006)	Chronchitis (2007)	Slightly Not Stoned Enough to Eat Breakfast Yet Stoopid (2008)

Professional ratings
Review scores
Source	Rating
AbsolutePunk.net	(68%)
Allmusic	3.5/5 stars

Chronchitis is American band Slightly Stoopid's fifth studio album, produced by Mario C, Paul Leary, Miguel and Chris DiBeneditto, released on August 7, 2007, on Stoopid Records/Controlled Substance Sound Labs. This album features artists such as G Love, Guru of Gang Starr, Angelo Moore of Fishbone, Toko Tasi and Money Mark.

The album debuted at number 55 on the U.S. Billboard 200, selling about 12,000 copies in its first week.

Chronichitis was released in Japan on June 4, 2008, on Powerslave Records with six bonus tracks.

== Track listing ==
All tracks by Slightly Stoopid except where noted

1. "Anywhere I Go" – 4:27
2. "The Otherside" (feat. Guru) – 3:12
3. "Hold on to the One" – 3:42
4. "2am" – 4:59
5. "Blood of My Blood" – 3:14
6. "Nobody Knows" – 3:48
7. "Above the Clouds" – 3:59
8. "Digital" – 3:49
9. "Round the World" – 3:22
10. "Baby I Like It" (feat. G. Love) – 4:15
11. "Ocean" – 3:19
12. "Jimi" – 3:46
13. "Breakbeat" (feat. DJ Hellnaw) – 3:56
14. "Mind on Your Music" – 2:17
15. "Ever Really Wanted" (feat. Angelo Moore) – 4:01
16. "Girl U So Fine" / "Girl U So Fine, Pt. 2" (feat. Toko Tasi) – 5:54
17. "Reward for Me" (Joe Higgs) – 2:49

=== Japan Release Bonus Tracks ===
- "No Cocaine (feat. Inner Circle)"
- "False Rhythms"
- "She Bangz"
- "London Dub"
- "The Fruits “Legalize Them”"
- "Ain't No Reason to Go"

== Charts ==
Chart (2007)	Peak position
US Billboard 200	55
US Top Alternative Albums (Billboard)	15
US Digital Albums (Billboard)	55
US Independent Albums (Billboard)	2
US Indie Store Album Sales (Billboard)	10

== Personnel ==
- Brad Bell – Assistant Engineer
- Jeffrey Lamont Brown – Photography
- Mario Caldato, Jr. – Producer, Engineer, Mixing
- C-Money – Trumpet, Keyboards
- Dela – Saxophone
- Chris DiBeneditto – Producer, Engineer, Mixing
- DJ Hell Naw – Turntables
- Miles Doughty – Bass, Guitar, Vocals, Group Member
- Brian Gardner – Mastering
- Lizzie Garlinghouse – Publicity
- Michael "Miguel" Happoldt – Producer, Engineer, Mixing, Tracking
- Paul Leary – Piano (Electric), Producer, Engineer, Mixing, Wurlitzer
- Kyle McDonald – Bass, Guitar, Vocals, Engineer, Group Member
- Money Mark – Synthesizer, Piano, Vibraphone
- Oscar Monsalve – Engineer
- Angelo Moore – Performer
- Ryan Moran (RyMo) – Drums, Group Member
- Oguer Ocon – Harmonica, Percussion, Group Member
- Jon Phillips – Management
- Matt Phillips – Management
- Stuart MacKay Smith – Artwork, Layout Design
- Solaar – Engineer
- Stuart Sullivan – Engineer, Mixing
- Mike Sutherland – Engineer, Assistant Engineer
- Toko Tasi – Performer

== Other ==
- This was to be the first studio album released by Slightly Stoopid that did not feature any punk rock themed tracks (with exception to the Japanese release which features tracks "She Bangz" and "Ain't No Reason To Go". Both of which can be found on their later release Slightly Not Stoned Enough To Eat Breakfast Yet Stoopid in America.)
