= Slightly Stoopid =

American reggae rock/punk band

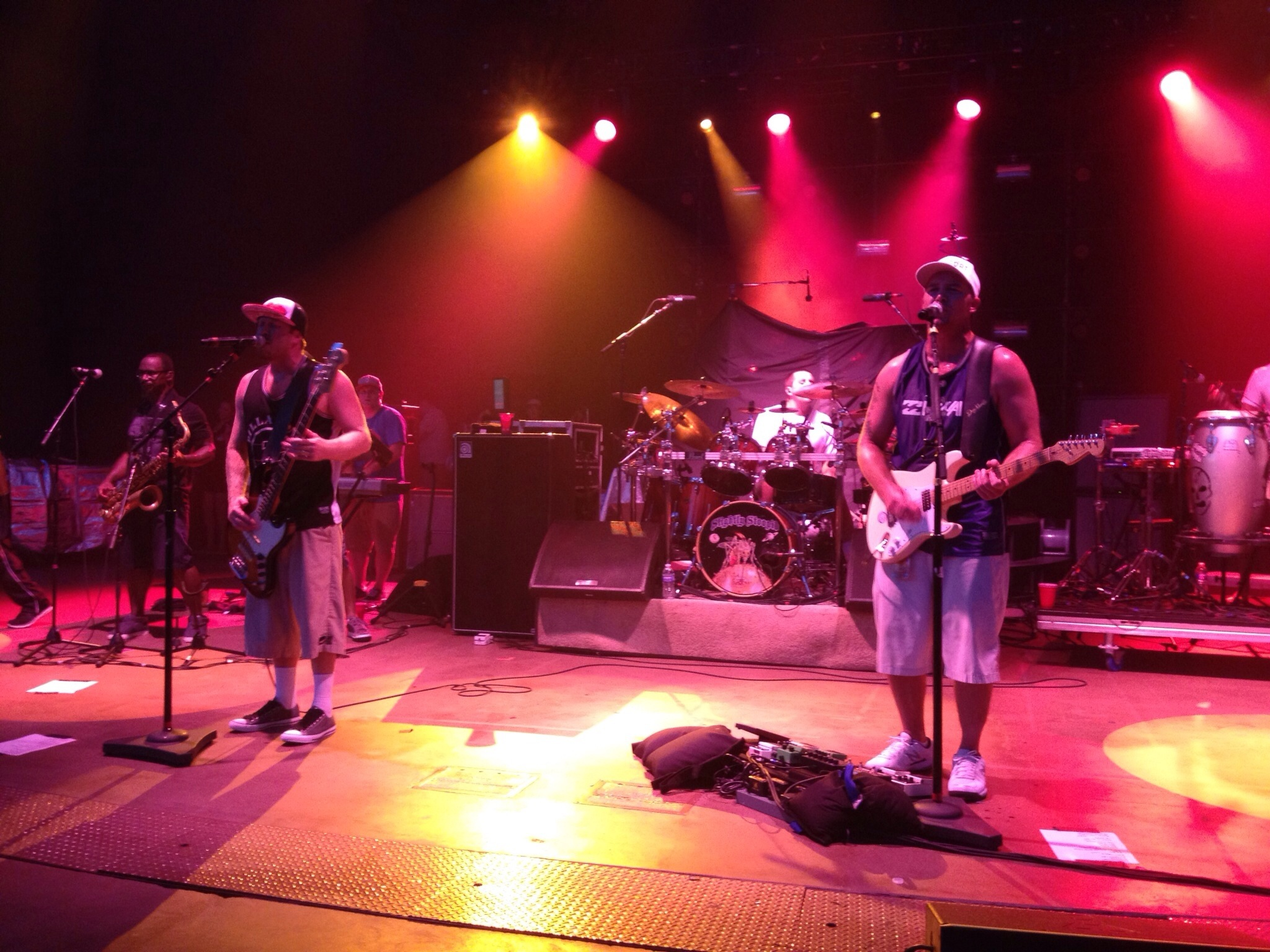

Background information
- Origin: Ocean Beach, San Diego, California, U.S.
- Genres: Reggae rock; punk rock
- Years active: 1994–present
- Labels: Skunk, Stoopid, Surfdog
- Members: Miles Doughty; Kyle McDonald; Ryan Moran; DeLa; Paul Wolstencroft; Andy Geib
- Past members: Adam Bausch; Kelly Vargas; Dan Lancelot; Paul Vrieling; Damion Ramirez; Doze; C-Money; Eric Bausch Oguer Ocon
- Website: slightlystoopid.com

Slightly Stoopid is an American rock band based in the Ocean Beach neighborhood of San Diego, California, who describe their music as "a fusion of folk, rock, reggae and blues with hip-hop, funk, metal and punk." As a band, they have released 13 albums (four live). The band was originally signed by Bradley Nowell from the band Sublime to his label Skunk Records while still in high school.

== History ==
=== Founding, early releases (1994–2007) ===
In 1994, Slightly Stoopid was formed in Ocean Beach, California by Miles Doughty and Kyle McDonald, both childhood friends, as well as high school friend and drummer Adam Bausch. Sublime front man Bradley Nowell was staying with Doughty's nurse mother and doctor boyfriend in their drug rehabilitation program when he stumbled across the band. After waking up one morning, he overheard the band practicing in the garage and was impressed, asking them to perform in Long Beach, California, at the Foot Hill Tavern. Nowell shortly after signed them to his label Skunk Records while the members were still attending high school. In 1996 the band released their first studio album, the punk-tinged Slightly $toopid (featuring a guest appearance by Nowell on the song "Prophet" – later covered by Sublime and released on their box set, Everything Under the Sun) and 1998's surf-inspired The Longest Barrel Ride. In the early days of the band, Adam's brother Eric Bausch played keys.

The group self-released 2001's Acoustic Roots: Live & Direct (a 40-minute acoustic set, captured live at San Diego's rock 105.3 radio station on the Latitude 32 show) – the first for their own label, Stoopid Records, before issuing 2003's Everything You Need on Surfdog Records (a musical departure for the band, that sold more than 185,000 copies).

Adam Bausch left the band in 2000, two years after recording and releasing The Longest Barrel Ride. Slightly Stoopid had four drummers between Adam Bausch and their current drummer, Ryan 'RyMo' Moran. These drummers include: Kelly Vargas (of Sublime / Dissension), Dan 'Dano' Lancelot (of Gloritone / Dano's Island Sounds), Damion Ramirez (of Capitol Eye / Long Beach Shortbus), and Paul Vrieling (who is pictured in the background on the cover of the Everything You Need album). Percussionist Oguer 'OG' Ocon (congas, percussion, harp, vocals) joined the band in 2002.

After solidifying a new line-up with the removal of Bausch, due to personal differences, with the additions of Ryan 'RyMo' Moran (drums) from b-Side Players, the band began to mix even more different musical styles on 2005's Closer to the Sun. The album featured collaborations with well-known reggae names such as Barrington Levy and Scientist. Closer to the Sun impressively debuted in the Billboard Top 200 and sold nearly 25,000 copies in its first two months of release.

A year later, Slightly Stoopid issued their first-ever electric live album, Winter Tour '05-'06 Live CD/DVD, as well as their first-ever DVD, Live in San Diego, while 2007 saw the release of the group's fifth studio effort, Chronchitis, which debuted at #55 on the Billboard 200, and #2 on the Independent Albums charts. In 2006, the band added horn players Christofer "C-Money" Welter & Daniel "DeLa" Delacruz to their line-up. C-Money doubled as a keys player.

=== Live touring ===
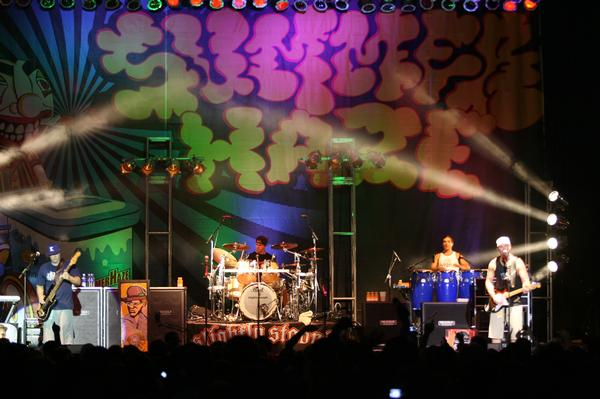
Summer Haze 2007 tour

The group has toured frequently since its inception, including appearances at arts festivals such as Coachella, Harmony, Lollapalooza, Austin City Limits, and New Orleans Jazz Fest. Additionally, the group has played sold-out shows in Australia, Japan, Guam, Portugal, Denmark, the UK, Germany, the Netherlands, and the Dominican Republic. "Without [the fans], we'd just be playing at the bar", admits Kyle. "They make it worth our while – when we go out and people are having that good of a time, the energy goes back and forth. Just a good time – we rely on each other's energy."

Slightly Stoopid has played with the Dave Matthews Band, Damian "Jr. Gong" Marley (and the Marley Brothers), Sublime, the Roots, The Expendables, Snoop Dogg, G. Love & Special Sauce, Ozomatli, Toots and the Maytals, Helva, and Pennywise, among others, as well as their first-ever sole headlining tour of amphitheaters in 2008, joined by their friends Pepper and Sly & Robbie featuring Cherine Anderson.

The band teamed up with Snoop Dogg in 2009 for the co-headlining "Blazed & Confused Tour" across North America.

=== Stoopid Records, live albums (2008–2011) ===
In 2008, the band issued their first-ever 'odds and ends' collection, Slightly Not Stoned Enough to Eat Breakfast Yet Stoopid – the group's newest release for their growing label, Stoopid Records (which also featured releases by other groups, including the label's first signed act, The Expendables from Santa Cruz, California). Included on Slightly Not Stoned Enough to Eat Breakfast Yet Stoopid are outtakes from both the Closer to the Sun (including tracks that were previously issued as a limited edition bonus CD) and Chronchitis sessions, as well as a bevy of new material recorded at the famed Circle House Studios in Miami, Florida, and such cover tunes as UB40's "I Would Do For You" and the traditional "I Know You Rider" (most notably covered by The Grateful Dead). Also making their first appearance on a Slightly Stoopid studio album are newly recorded renditions of the long-time live standards "False Rhythms" and "Sinsemilla".

On September 13, 2011, the band was invited by the Grateful Dead's Bob Weir to his state-of-the-art TRI Studios for a live webcast and in-studio performance. Utilizing the technology of the studio's Constellation sound system, Slightly Stoopid had the privilege of inviting some of their closest friends and family members down to record Live at Roberto's TRI Studios, performing alongside Weir as well as Karl Denson, Don Carlos, Ivan Neville, Ian Neville, and host Tommy Chong. In 2011, Paul Wolstencroft joined the band on keyboard and organs.

=== Top of the World and Meanwhile...Back At The Lab (2012–Present) ===
The band's seventh studio album, Top of the World, was released on August 14, 2012. The seven-piece band continues to explore a variety of styles on Top of the World, with help from some of their biggest influences and heroes including: reggae legends Barrington Levy and Don Carlos of Black Uhuru; "unofficial 8th member" Karl Denson of Greyboy Allstars; longtime band friend and touring partner G. Love; Fishbone frontman Angelo Moore; ex-Jurassic 5 emcee extraordinaire Chali 2na; Dumpstaphunk's Ian Neville; and hit-making singer/songwriter Angela Hunte. The album entered the Billboard 200 at a career high #13, as well as on Billboard's Independent Albums chart at #3. Top of the World also debuted on Billboard's Rock Albums and Alternative Albums charts with a final position of #4.

The band released their music video for "Don't Stop," on Valentine's Day of that year. The video would win music video of the year at the 2013 San Diego Music Awards.

Following the album release, the band performed on the "Red Bull Sound Space at KROQ" on August 23, followed by appearances on tastemaker indie music website Daytrotter and SiriusXM. The group also appeared on Jimmy Kimmel Live! on September 12 to play their current single, "Top of the World."

At the end of 2013, C-Money parted ways with the band and was replaced by Andy Geib on trombone & trumpet.

Slightly Stoopid continued to tour extensively, playing 38 dates in 2014 in cities all across the US. Their summer 2014 tour featured G. Love and also Bob Marley's son, Stephen Marley.

On April 20, 2015, Slightly Stoopid announced via their social media pages and website that they intended to release a new album, entitled Meanwhile...Back At The Lab. The album was released on June 30, 2015. The album's track list was subsequently published on iTunes.

The band released the video for "The Prophet," which featured unreleased footage of Sublime's late singer Bradley Nowell which was recorded by Miles' mother Laurie Daniels. The video would win Music Video of the Year at the 2015 San Diego Music Awards.

The band's eighth album, Everyday Life, Everyday People, released on July 13, 2018. It topped the Billboard Reggae Albums chart. The album features special guests, Italian reggae artist, Alborosie, UB40's Ali Campbell, Chali 2na, Don Carlos (on two tracks), G.Love, and Yellowman.

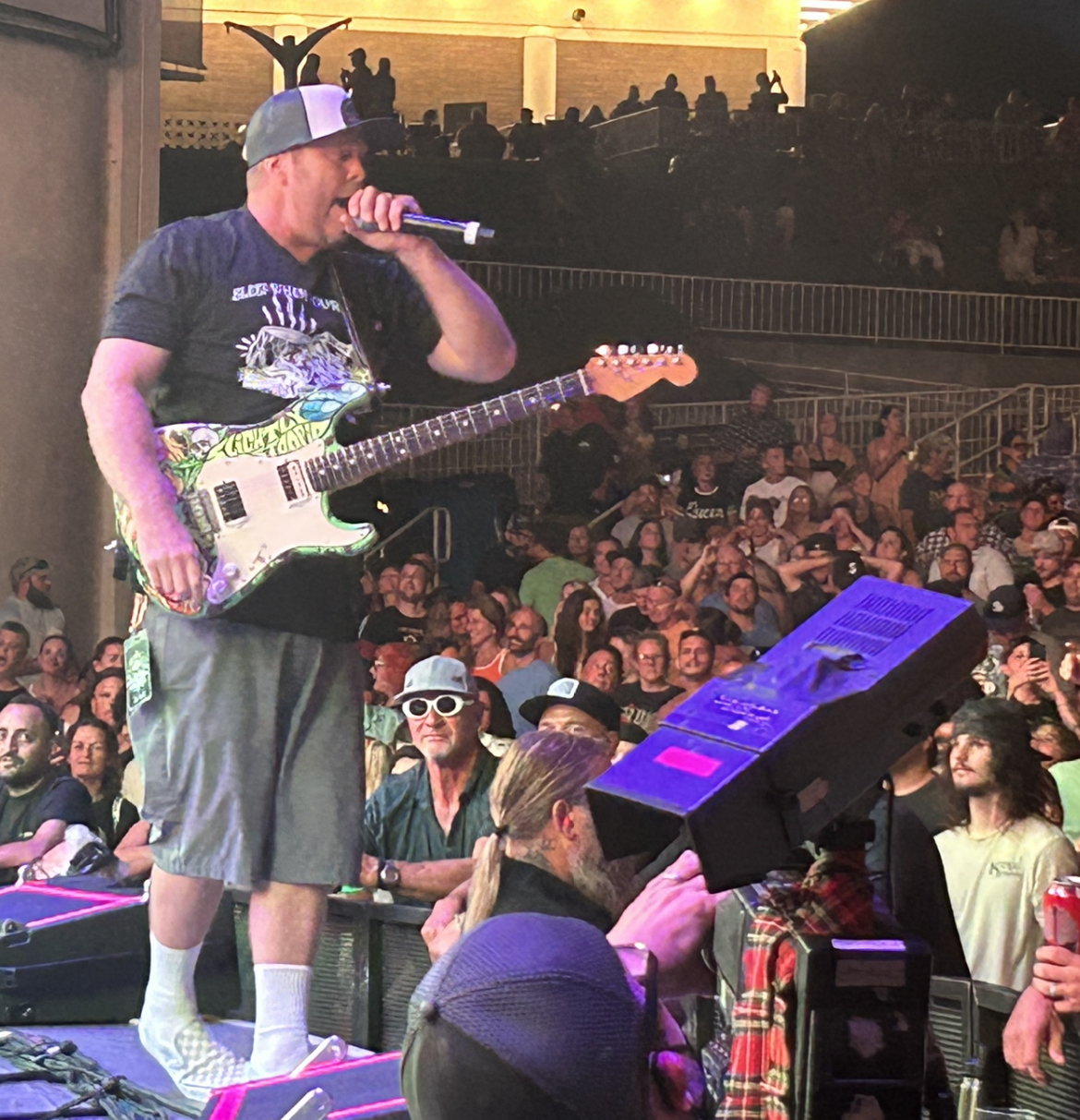
Slightly Stoopid perform at PNC Bank Arts Center in New Jersey on August 17, 2023.

== Musical influences ==
The group is noted for their eclectic mix of rock, reggae, blues, hip-hop, metal and funk in their works. When the group first started out, they drew numerous influences from the likes of punk rock groups such as Sublime, Operation Ivy, and Rancid. Slightly Stoopid's self-titled album was released months after Brad Nowell's death in 1996 under Skunk Records. Their reggae influences stem from artists such as Yellowman, Don Carlos and Buju Banton.

The band has also experimented with hip-hop on their more recent albums. The song "The Otherside" off the album Chronchitis features the late rapper Guru. They note hip hop influences NWA and Eazy-E, Wu-Tang Clan, and Gang Starr. Miles Doughty's vocal style in particular references reggae legends Eek a Mouse, Pinchers, and Tenor Saw quite often.

== Lineup ==
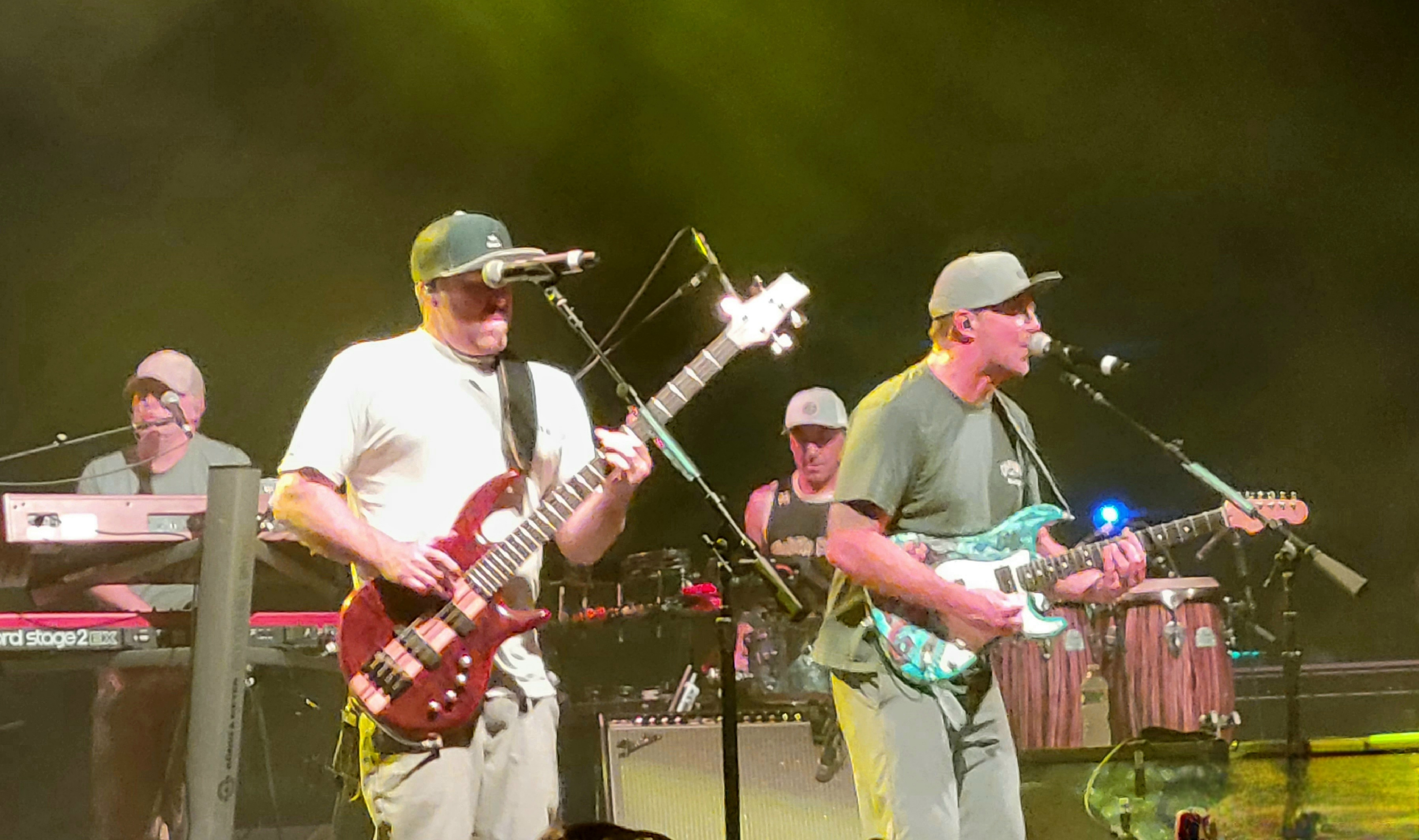
Slightly Stoopid performing at the Leader Bank Pavilion in Boston, MA in July 2022.

=== Current band members ===
- Miles Doughty – Lead Vocals, Guitar, Bass (1994–Present)
- Kyle McDonald – Lead Vocals, Bass, Guitar (1994–Present)
- Ryan Moran ("RyMo") – Drums (2000–Present)
- Daniel "DeLa" Delacruz – Saxophone (2006–Present)
- Andy Geib – Trombone (2013–Present)
- Paul Wolstencroft – Keyboards (2013–Present)

=== Guest members ===
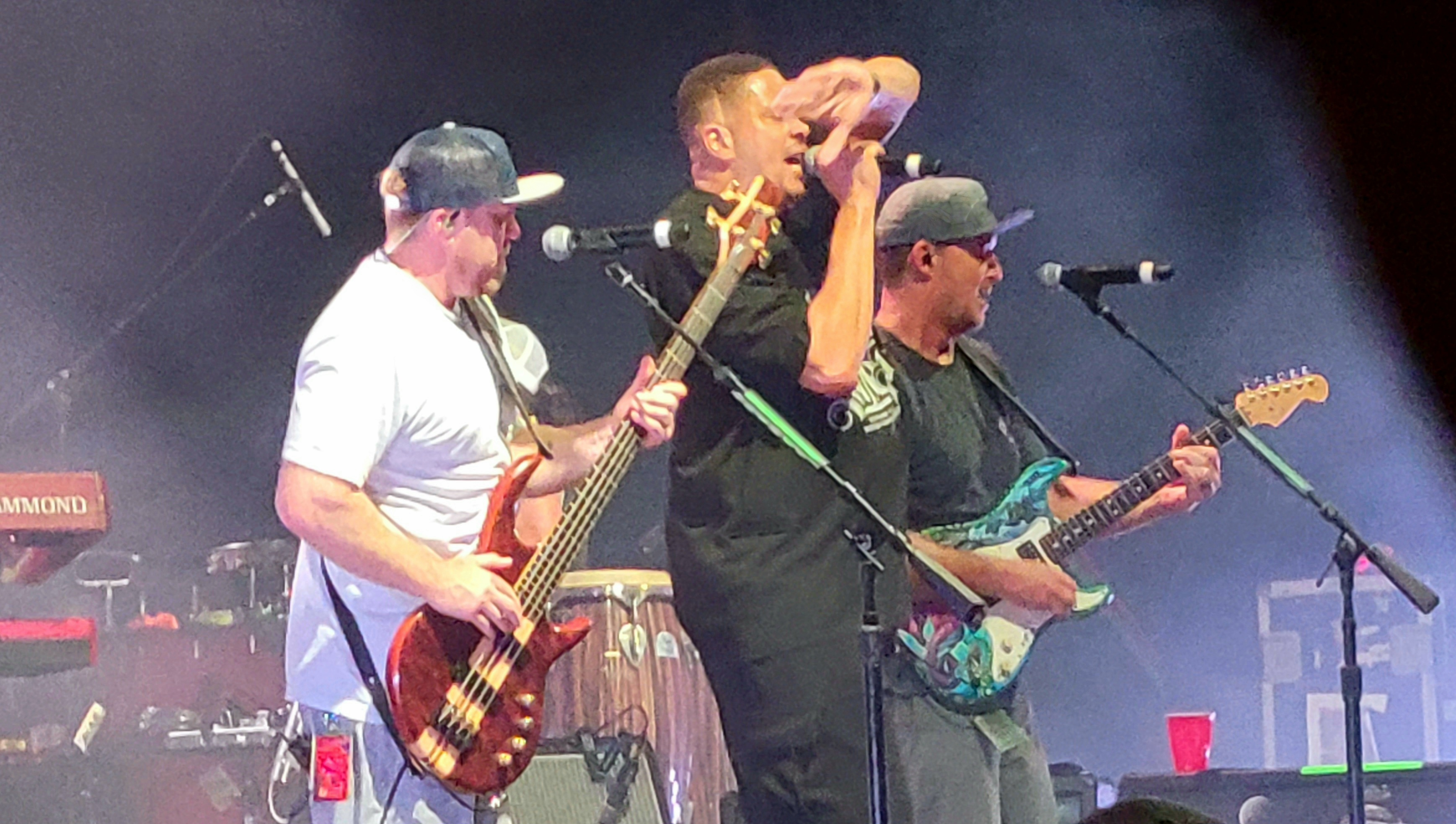
Slightly Stoopid with Chali 2na performing at the Leader Bank Pavilion in Boston, MA in July 2022.

- Karl Denson – saxophone (guest on Top of the World album) (2012)
- Don Carlos
- Rashawn Ross
- Chali 2na (Jurassic Five)

=== Past band members ===
- Adam Bausch – Drums (1994–2000)
- Chris "C-Money" Welter – Trumpet (2006–2013)
- Oguer "OG" Ocon – Congas, Percussion, Harp, Backing Vocals (2003–2024)

== Discography ==
=== Studio albums ===
List of studio albums and chart peaks by Slightly Stoopid
| Year | Album title | Billboard chart Peaks | | | | | | | | Release details |
| Year | Album title | US | Ind | Alt | Digi | Heat | Taste | Int | Reg | Release details |
|---|---|---|---|---|---|---|---|---|---|---|
| 1996 | Slightly $toopid | — | — | — | — | — | — | — | — | Released: 1996; Label: Skunk; Format: CD |
| 1998 | The Longest Barrel Ride | — | — | — | — | — | — | — | — | Released: November 21, 1998; Label: Skunk; Format: CD |
| 2003 | Everything You Need | — | 20 | — | — | 35 | — | — | — | Released: March 18, 2003; Label: Surfdog; Format: CD |
| 2005 | Closer to the Sun | 121 | — | — | — | 1 | — | 4 | — | Released: April 19, 2005; Label: Reincarnate Music/Imusic; Format: CD, digital |
| 2007 | Chronchitis | 55 | 2 | 15 | 55 | — | 10 | 55 | — | Released: August 7, 2007; Label: Controlled Substance Sound Labs, Powerslave (Japan); Format: CD, digital |
| 2008 | Slightly Not Stoned Enough to Eat Breakfast Yet Stoopid | 73 | 8 | 22 | 19 | — | — | — | — | Released: July 22, 2008; Label: Stoopid; Format: CD, digital |
| 2012 | Top of the World | 13 | 3 | 4 | 6 | — | 5 | 5 | — | Released: August 14, 2012; Label: Stoopid; Format: CD, digital |
| 2015 | Meanwhile...Back at the Lab | 37 | 3 | 3 | 13 | — | 12 | 13 | — | Released: June 29, 2015; Label: Stoopid; Format: CD, digital |
| 2018 | Everyday Life, Everyday People | 60 | 2 | 5 | 9 | — | 13 | — | 1 | Released: July 13, 2018; Label: Stoopid; Format: Vinyl, CD, Cassette, digital |
"—" denotes a recording that did not chart or was not released in that territory.

=== Live albums/DVDs ===
- 2001: Acoustic Roots: Live & Direct
- 2006: Winter Tour '05-'06 Live CD/DVD
- 2006: Live in San Diego DVD
- 2013: Slightly Stoopid & Friends: Live at Roberto's TRI Studios

=== EPs ===
- Slightly Not Stoned Enough To Eat Breakfast Yet Stoopid EP (2008)

=== Singles ===
Incomplete list of songs by Slightly Stoopid
| Year | Title | Chart peaks | | Certifications | Album |
| Year | Title | Mod Rock | Hot Rock | Certifications | Album |
|---|---|---|---|---|---|
| 2007 | "2 A.M." | 37 | — | RIAA: Platinum | Chronchitis |
| 2012 | "Top Of The World" | 25 | | | Top of the World |
| 2015 | "The Prophet" | 40 | — | | Meanwhile...Back at the Lab |

=== Other certified songs ===
Incomplete list of songs by Slightly Stoopid
| Year | Title | Certifications | Album |
|---|---|---|---|
| 2003 | "Collie Man" | RIAA: Gold | Everything You Need |
| 2005 | "Closer To The Sun" | RIAA: Platinum | Closer To The Sun |

=== Songs ===
- Singles that did not chart/top tracks off each album

| Title | Release date | Album |
|---|---|---|
| "Hey Stoopid" (Live) | 1996 | Slightly $toopid |
| "Righteous Man" | 1996 | Slightly $toopid |
| "Civil Oppression" | 1996 | Slightly $toopid |
| "Smoke Rasta Dub" | 1996 | Slightly $toopid |
| "American Man" | 1996 | Slightly $toopid |
| "To A Party" | 1996 | Slightly $toopid |
| "Living Dread" | 1998 | Longest Barrel Ride |
| "Struggler" | 1998 | Longest Barrel Ride |
| "Ese Loco" | 1998 | Longest Barrel Ride |
| "Castles Made of Sand" | 1998 | Longest Barrel Ride |
| "Johnny Law" | 1998 | Longest Barrel Ride |
| "Sinking Stone" | 1998 | Longest Barrel Ride |
| "Hands of Time" | 1998 | Longest Barrel Ride |
| "I'm So Stoned" | 1998 | Longest Barrel Ride |
| "Slightly Stoopid" | 1998 | Longest Barrel Ride |
| "Collie Man" | 2003 | Everything You Need |
| "Killin' Me Deep Inside" | 2003 | Everything You Need |
| "Everything You Need" | 2003 | Everything You Need |
| "Mellow Mood" (feat. G. Love) | 2003 | Everything You Need |
| "Wicked Rebel" | 2003 | Everything You Need |
| "Officer" | 2003 | Everything You Need |
| "Leaving On A Jet Plane" | 2003 | Everything You Need |
| "World Goes Round" (feat. I-Man) | 2003 | Everything You Need |
| "Runnin' With A Gun" | 2003 | Everything You Need |
| "Prophet" | 2004 | Acoustic Roots: Live & Direct |
| "Couldn't Get High" | 2004 | Acoustic Roots: Live & Direct |
| "Sensimilla" | 2004 | Acoustic Roots: Live & Direct |
| "Fire Shot" | 2004 | Acoustic Roots: Live & Direct |
| "Closer To The Sun" | 2005 | Closer To The Sun |
| "This Joint" | 2005 | Closer To The Sun |
| "Bandelero" | 2005 | Closer To The Sun |
| "Don't Care" | 2005 | Closer To The Sun |
| "See It No Other Way" (feat. Barrington Levy) | 2005 | Closer To The Sun |
| "I Would Do For You" | 2005 | Closer To The Sun |
| "Till It Gets Wet" | 2005 | Closer To The Sun |
| "Ain't Got A Lot of Money" | 2005 | Closer To The Sun |
| "Fat Spliffs" | 2005 | Closer To The Sun |
| "Open Road" | 2005 | Closer To The Sun |
| "Hold on to the One" | 2007 | Chronchitis |
| "Anywhere I Go" | 2007 | Chronchitis |
| "Ocean" | 2007 | Chronchitis |
| "Round The World" | 2007 | Chronchitis |
| "Nobody Knows" | 2007 | Chronchitis |
| "The Otherside" (feat. Guru) | 2007 | Chronchitis |
| "Blood of My Blood" | 2007 | Chronchitis |
| "Baby I Like It" (feat. G. Love) | 2007 | Chronchitis |
| "Girl U So Fine, Part 1 & 2" | 2007 | Chronchitis |
| "The Fruits (Legalize Them)" | 2008 | Slightly Not Stoned Enough to Eat Breakfast Yet Stoopid EP |
| "Tom & Jerry" | 2008 | Slightly Not Stoned Enough to Eat Breakfast Yet Stoopid EP |
| "No Cocaine" | 2008 | Slightly Not Stoned Enough to Eat Breakfast Yet Stoopid EP |
| "Supernatural" | 2008 | Slightly Not Stoned Enough to Eat Breakfast Yet Stoopid EP |
| "Thinkin' Bout Cops" | 2008 | Slightly Not Stoned Enough to Eat Breakfast Yet Stoopid EP |
| "She Bang" | 2008 | Slightly Not Stoned Enough to Eat Breakfast Yet Stoopid EP |
| "Just Thinking" (feat. Chali 2na) | 2012 | Top of the World |
| "Marijuana" (feat. Don Carlos) | 2012 | Top of the World |
| "Don't Stop" | 2012 | Top of the World |
| "Deal With Rhythm" | 2012 | Top of the World |
| "Ur Love" (feat. Barrington Levy) | 2012 | Top of the World |
| "New Day" | 2012 | Top of the World |
| "Mona June" (feat. Angela Hunte) | 2012 | Top of the World |
| "Hiphoppablues" (feat. G. Love) | 2012 | Top of the World |
| "Ska Diddy" (feat. Angelo Moore) | 2012 | Top of the World |
| "Dabbington" | 2015 | Meanwhile...Back at the Lab |
| "One Bright Day" (feat. Angela Hunte) | 2015 | Meanwhile...Back at the Lab |
| "Fuck You" (feat. Beardo) | 2015 | Meanwhile...Back at the Lab |
| "This Version" | 2015 | Meanwhile...Back at the Lab |
| "Rolling Stone" | 2015 | Meanwhile...Back at the Lab |
| "If You Want It" (feat. Alborosie) | 2018 | Everyday Life, Everyday People |
| "One More Night" | 2018 | Everyday Life, Everyday People |
| "Stay The Same (Prayer For You)" (feat. Don Carlos) | 2018 | Everyday Life, Everyday People |
| "Livin' In Babylon" (feat. Yellowman) | 2018 | Everyday Life, Everyday People |
| "Punisher" | 2018 | Everyday Life, Everyday People |
| "Everyday People" (feat. G. Love) | 2018 | Everyday Life, Everyday People |
| "Fire Below" | 2018 | Everyday Life, Everyday People |
| "Legalize It" (feat. Ali Campbell of UB40) | 2018 | Everyday Life, Everyday People |
| "Too Late" | 2018 | Everyday Life, Everyday People |
| "Higher Now" (feat. Chali 2na) | 2018 | Everyday Life, Everyday People |
| "Talk Too Much" (feat. Don Carlos) | 2018 | Everyday Life, Everyday People |
| "No One Stops Us Now/Nobody Knows" | 2018 | Everyday Life, Everyday People |
| "The Gambler" (Kenny Rogers cover) | April 3, 2020 | (Single) |
| "Too Late" (Stick Figure Remix) | June 17, 2020 | (Single) |
| "Everyday People" (Headhunter Remix) (feat. B-Real of Cypress Hill and G. Love & Special Sauce) | December 10, 2021 | (Single) |
| "Got Me On The Run" (feat. Stick Figure and Pepper) | November 10, 2023 | (Single) |

== Summer tours ==
Summer tours for Slightly Stoopid
| Year | Tour name | Tour-mates |
|---|---|---|
| 2007 | Summer Haze Tour | G. Love and Ozomatli |
| 2008 | Tailgate Tour | Pepper and Sly & Robbie |
| 2009 | Blazed and Confused Tour | Snoop Dogg and Stephen Marley |
| 2010 | Legalize It Tour | Cypress Hill and Collie Buddz |
| 2011 | Seedless Summer Tour | Rebelution and Shwayze & Cisco Adler |
| 2012 | Unity Tour | 311, SOJA, and The Aggrolites |
| 2013 | Kickin' Up Dust Tour | Atmosphere |
| 2014 | Summer Sessions Tour | Stephen Marley, G. Love & Special Sauce, and NOFX |
| 2015 | Everything is Awesome Tour | Dirty Heads, The Expendables, and Stick Figure |
| 2016 | Return of the Red Eye Summer 2016 Tour | SOJA, Fortunate Youth (select dates), Zion-I, The Grouch, and Eligh (select dates) |
| 2017 | Sounds of Summer Tour 2017 | Iration, J Boog, and The Movement |
| 2018 | School's out for Summer 2018 | Stick Figure and Pepper |
| 2019 | How I Spent My Summer Vacation 2019 | Matisyahu, Tribal Seeds, and HIRIE |
| 2020 | Summer Traditions 2020 | Pepper, Common Kings, and Don Carlos (Canceled due to COVID-19) |
| 2021 | Summer Traditions 2021 | Pepper, Common Kings, and Don Carlos (Canceled due to COVID-19) |
| 2022 | Summer Traditions 2022 | Pepper, Common Kings, and Fortunate Youth |
| 2023 | Summertime 2023 | Sublime with Rome, Atmosphere, and The Movement |
| 2025 | Step Into the Sun Summer Tour | Iration, Little Stranger |

== Other projects ==
In August 2021, Slightly Stoopid collaborated with Stay Up Movement (SUM), a company that makes eco-friendly sunglasses. They have a pair of exclusive limited-edition polarized shades used and approved by the band (one in matte black with red + orange tinted lenses, and one in a tortoise shell frame).

After a decades-long relationship with Black Flys Sunglasses, in 2022, Slightly Stoopid teamed up with owner Moe Sim on his company's "Artist Collaborations" line. One of their limited edition sunglasses is called a "Stoopid Fly" which is decked out in the band's own branding.

In the summer of 2022, the band collaborated with Torrance, California's Buzzrock Brewing Co. with the "Stoopid Tangie Summer Haze", a fruity lager that's brewed with "stoopid" fruits, including tangerine.

== Gallery ==
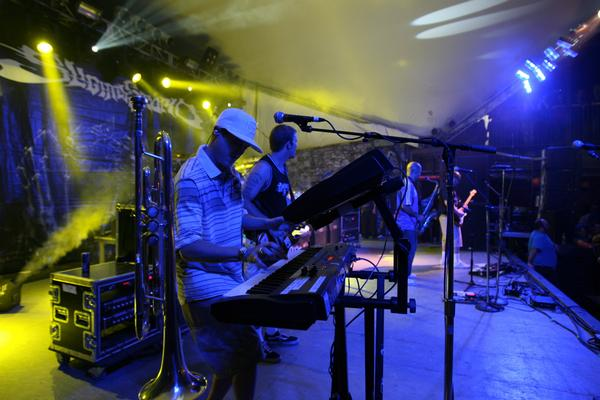
Flagstaff, AZ show 2007

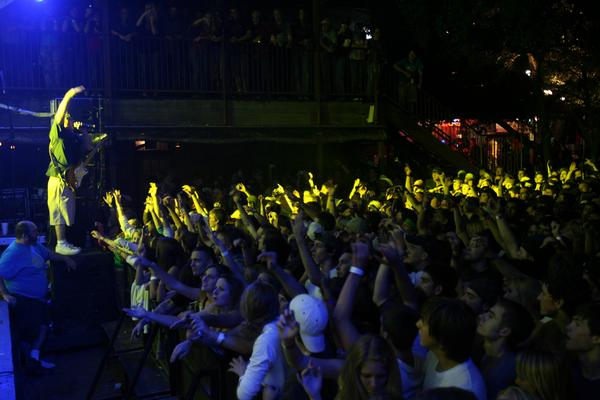
Slightly Stoopid in concert

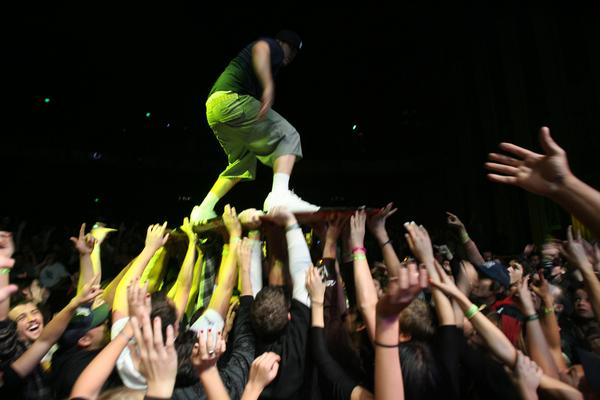
Bassist Kyle McDonald crowdsurfing

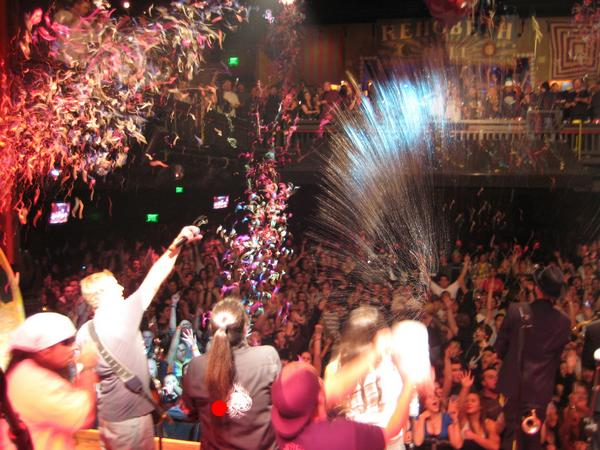
New Year's Eve 2007 at the House of Blues, Anaheim, CA

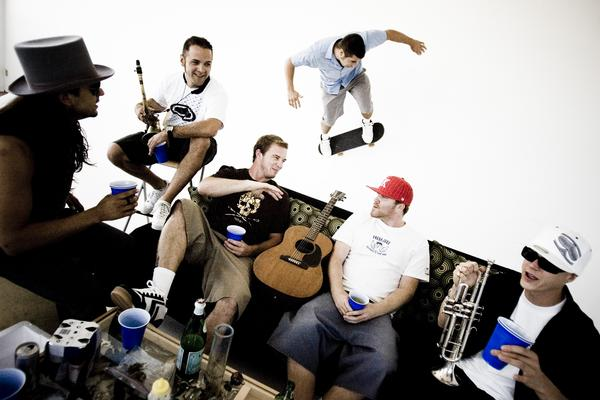
Group picture

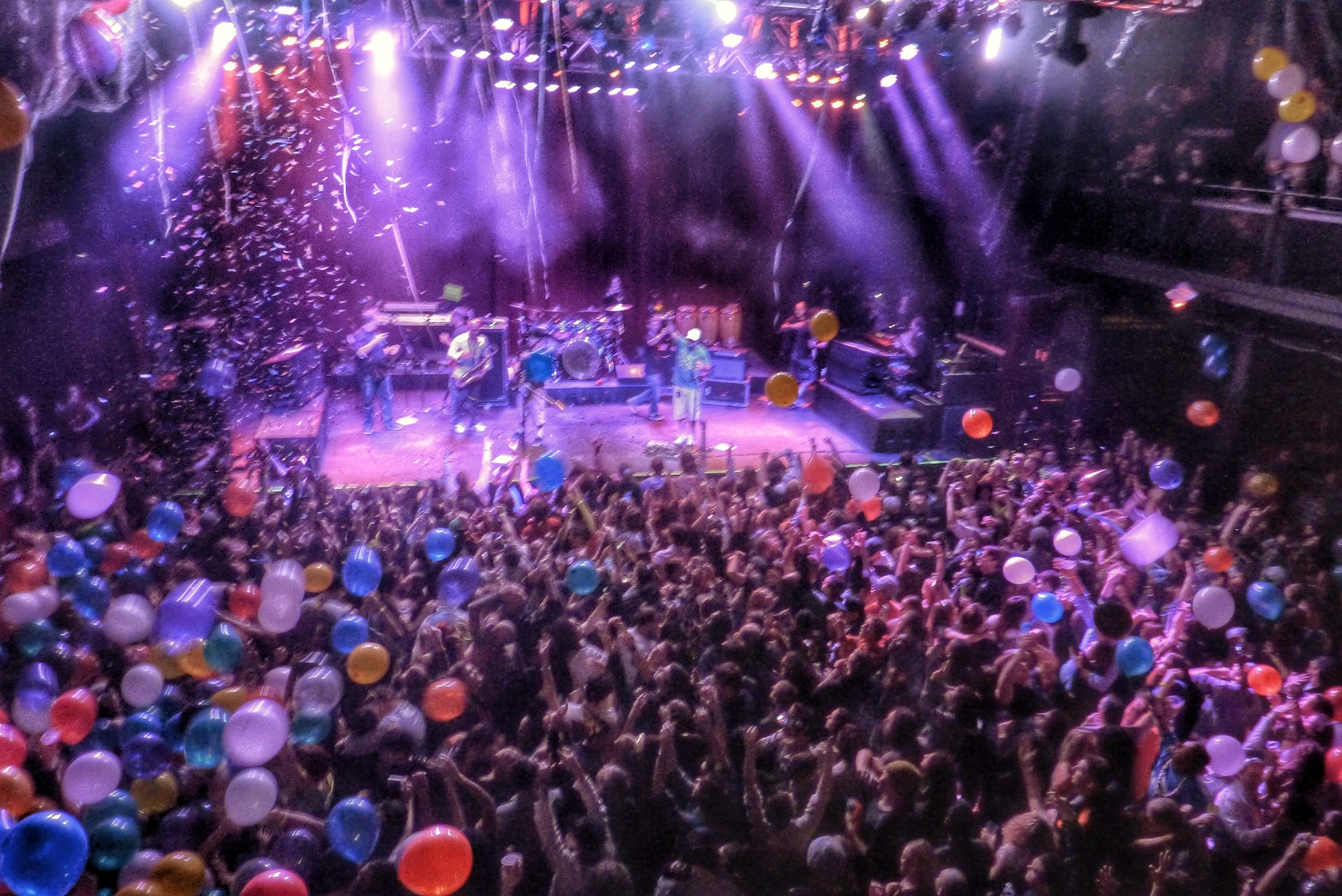
New Years 2014
