= Closer to the Sun (Slightly Stoopid album) =

Studio album by Slightly Stoopid
- Released: April 19, 2005
- Recorded: Total Access, Redondo Beach, California (2005)
- Length: 60:32
- Label: Reincarnate Music/Imusic

Slightly Stoopid chronology
Acoustic Roots: Live & Direct (2004)	Closer to the Sun (2005)	Chronchitis (2007)

Professional ratings
Review scores
Source	Rating
AllMusic	3.5/5 stars

Closer to the Sun is the fourth studio album by the rock band Slightly Stoopid, released in 2005. It debuted at #121 on the Billboard 200 chart.

== Track listing ==
1. "Intro" - 1:17
2. "Babylon Is Falling'" - 2:25
3. "Somebody" - 2:52
4. "Fat Spliffs" - 3:07
5. "Bandelero" - 2:46
6. "See It No Other Way" (featuring Barrington Levy and Mr. Mutton) - 3:53
7. "Nothin Over Me" - 1:20
8. "This Joint" - 4:07
9. "Older" - 3:39
10. "Ain't Got a Lot of Money" - 2:58
11. "'Till It Gets Wet" - 2:37
12. "Don't Care" (featuring Billy and Prof Most) - 4:39
13. "Basher" - 2:31
14. "Righteous Man" - 2:35
15. "Up on a Plane" - 3:00
16. "Waiting" - 2:54
17. "Closer to the Sun" - 2:25
18. "Zeplike" - 3:34
19. "Comb 4 My Dome" - 1:29
20. "Open Road" (contains the hidden track "Tom & Jerry") - 6:24

== Samples ==
"Somebody" contains a sample of "Da Mystery of Chessboxin'" by Wu Tang Clan.

"Nothin Over Me" contains a sample of the theme and background music from the arcade game Xevious.

== Charts ==
Chart (2005)	Peak position
US Billboard 200	121
US Heatseekers Albums (Billboard)	1
