= Ocean Beach, San Diego =

Ocean Beach, San Diego OB
- Community of San Diego
- Ocean Beach
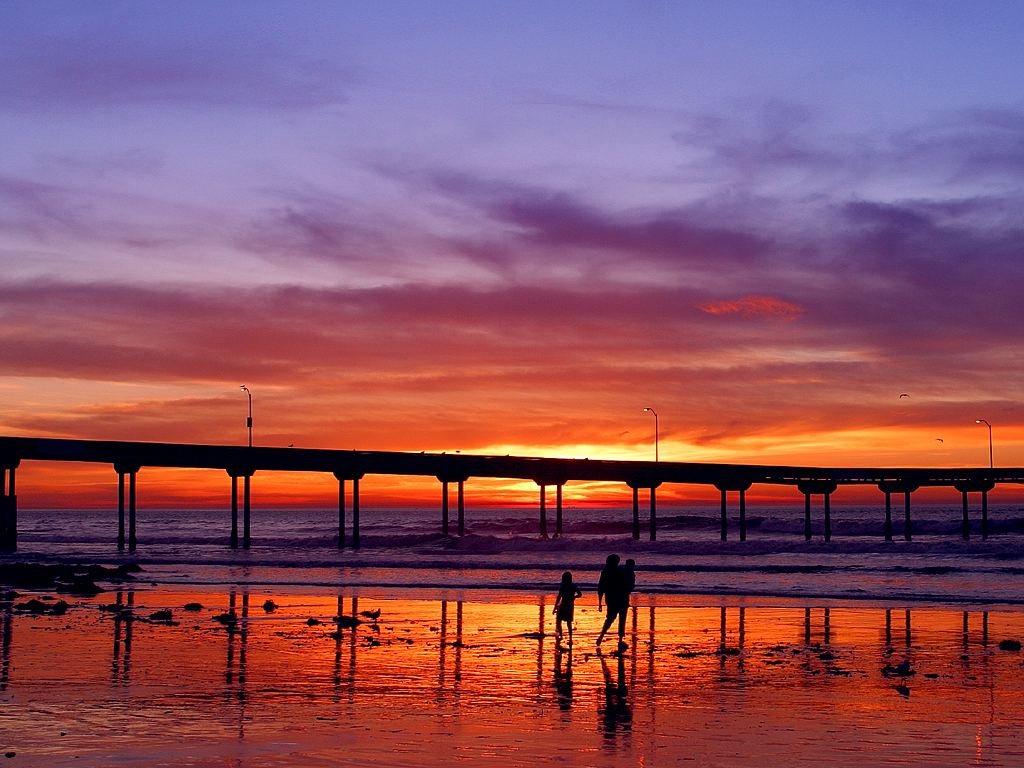
- The Ocean Beach Pier at sunset

- Location within Central San Diego Ocean Beach, San Diego (California) Ocean Beach, San Diego (the United States)
- Coordinates: 32°45′09″N 117°15′07″W
- Country: United States
- State: California
- County: San Diego
- City: San Diego
- Established: 1887

Area
  - Land: 1 sq mi (2.6 km^{2})

Population (2019)
  - Total: 31,223
- Postal code: 92107
- Website: https://oceanbeachsandiego.com/

Ocean Beach (also known as O.B.) is a beachfront neighborhood in San Diego, California.

== Geography ==
Ocean Beach lies on the Pacific Ocean at the estuary of the San Diego River, at the western terminus of Interstate 8. Located about 7 mi (11 km) northwest of downtown San Diego, it sits south of Mission Bay and Mission Beach and directly north of Point Loma. The O.B. community planning area comprises about 1 square mile (742 acres), bounded on the north by the San Diego River, on the west by the Pacific Ocean, on the east by Froude St., Seaside St. and West Point Loma Boulevard, and on the south by Adair Street.

== History ==
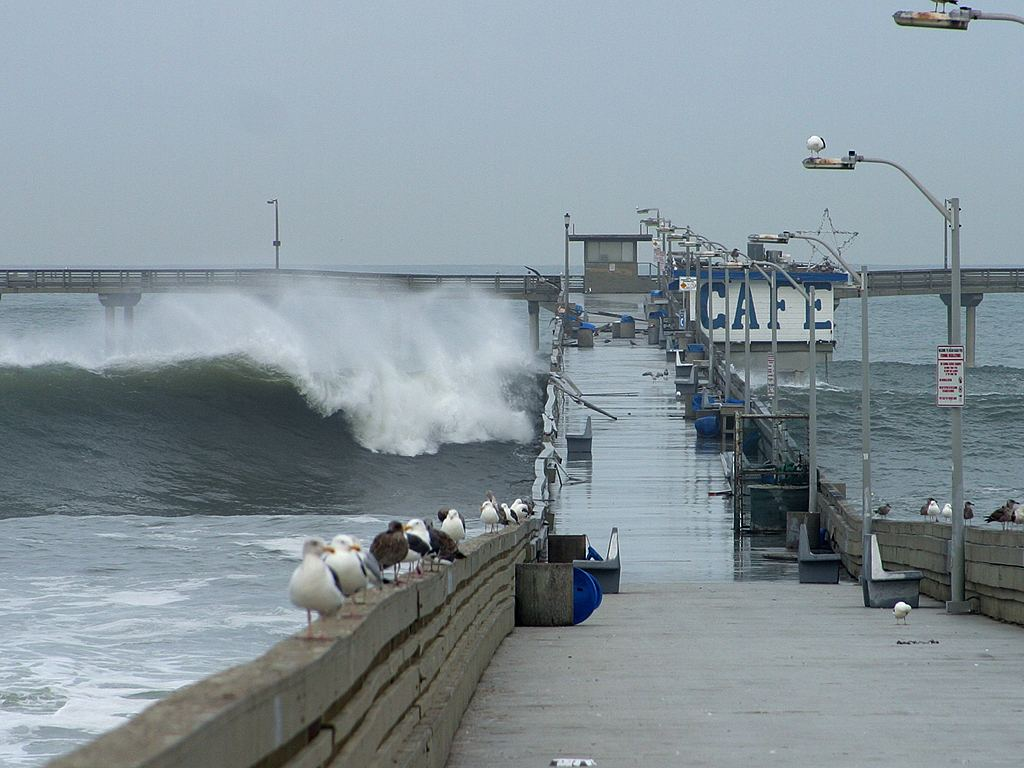
Waves crashing over the Ocean Beach Pier in 2002

Prior to European contact, the Kumeyaay people inhabited Ocean Beach and had established the fishing encampment of Hapai. The Kumeyaay visited the area to conduct fishing and food processing operations, as mussels, clams, abalone, and lobsters were harvested from the area.

The beach's initial name was Mussel Beach, for the mussels available there. Its current name, Ocean Beach, was given in 1887 by developers Billy Carlson and Albert E. Higgins.

The pair built the Cliff House, a resort hotel, and subdivided the area into lots. To promote their subdivision, Carlson and Higgins organized various activities, including mussel roasts and concerts. Despite their efforts, the development did not do well, because it was two and a half hours by carriage from downtown San Diego. They rented a locomotive, but by that time, the boom ended and the development was put on hold. The Ocean Beach Railroad, launched in April 1888, was a casualty of the economic decline. Passengers could take a ferry from San Diego to Roseville in Point Loma to ride the train to the Cliff House. Later, Higgins committed suicide, and a fire started by a fallen chandelier burnt down the Cliff House in 1898. Carlson sold the Ocean Beach tract to an Eastern financier, delaying its development for 20 years.

Carlson and Higgins were not the first to file a subdivision map in Ocean Beach. They filed with the city on May 28, 1887, but on April 22 of that year J.M. DePuy filed "DePuy's Subdivision" on 15 blocks in the northern portion of O.B.

One of the earliest residents of Ocean Beach was D. C. Collier, who bought oceanfront property there in 1887 when he was just 16. He later became one of the "fathers" of Ocean Beach, laying out streets, promoting sales, and building the Point Loma Railroad in 1909 to connect Ocean Beach with the rest of San Diego. By 1910 there were 100 houses in Ocean Beach, compared to just 18 two years earlier. According to historian Ruth Held, Collier's rail line "made OB possible." He also built Ocean Beach Elementary School (a two-room school) and donated park land to the city. Most of that land became Cleator Community Park (a ballfield), Correia Middle School (originally named Collier Junior High School), a YMCA and a church; a small remnant at Greene and Soto streets is still called Collier Park.

The northern end of Ocean Beach was dominated in the early 20th century by the Wonderland Amusement Park, which opened on July 4, 1913, and was constructed on eight oceanfront acres at Voltaire and Abbott streets. It boasted a large roller coaster, dance pavilion, menagerie, roller skating rink, merry-go-round, children's playground, a petting zoo with a variety of animals including 500 monkeys, and 22,000 lights outlining the buildings. However, Wonderland went bankrupt in 1915 due to competition from the Panama–California Exposition in Balboa Park and was sold at auction. It closed in 1916 after winter storms damaged the roller coaster. The name "Wonderland" lives on in some Ocean Beach business names as well as the title of a documentary series on KPBS television hosted by Ocean Beach native Noah Tafolla.

In 1915, John D. Spreckels and his Bayshore Railway Company built a 1,500 ft (460 m) wooden bridge connecting Ocean Beach with Mission Beach. The company used the bridge for a trolley, part of the San Diego Class 1 Streetcars, which connected OB with downtown San Diego and encouraged the development of both Ocean Beach and Mission Beach. The bridge was demolished in January 1951, thereby cutting off through traffic to Ocean Beach from the Mission Beach and Pacific Beach communities.

The small cottages, bungalows, single-family homes and two-storied apartments in the residential areas, were filled with college students from several local colleges, joined by a good number of sailors, retirees and middle-class families. Some of the bungalows built as tourist accommodations atop the cliffs on either side of Niagara Avenue are still in use as businesses and homes.

With the dredging and development of Mission Bay and the dismantling of the Ocean Beach-Mission Beach bridge, O.B. became geographically isolated from the rest of San Diego and the other beach communities, until the construction of Interstate 8 in 1967. The westernmost segment of I-8 from Interstate 5 to the terminus in Ocean Beach is officially labeled the "Ocean Beach Freeway".

Surfing was introduced to San Diego at Ocean Beach in 1916 when a local lifeguard borrowed a board from Duke Kahanamoku (although it's possible that George Freeth surfed there between 1907 and 1909). By 1966, the sport was sufficiently established that the World Surfing Championship was held in O.B. Nat Young won the event and was named world surfing champion.

The Prohibition Law was set in the 1920s and banned selling alcohol. The 18th Amendment was in effect to stop selling alcohol and became illegal. Many believed it was the “America's National Curse,” and having this law will strengthen families but didn't last long. “Thousands of jobs were eliminated when breweries, distilleries, and saloons were shut down.” Their goal was to strengthen families to end up ruining the economy. The only way there was access to alcohol were speakeasies. Tijuana was one of the main places with speakeasies that was still selling alcohol while people went through the border and back. Before the Ocean Beach Tavern was designed as a prohibition roadhouse to conceal alcohol behind for customers. One of the main speakeasies in Ocean Beach that is still open to now, Tony's did the same. In addition to Tony's speakeasies, there are well known historic restaurants that lasted a while.

Ocean Beach was once known as the Haight-Ashbury of San Diego. The community became an attraction for hippies, who eventually became accepted by many local business establishments. The Black headshop opened on Newport Avenue, as well as the Ocean Beach People's Organic Food Market.

Beginning in the early 1970s, local development and land interests pressed for the development of Ocean Beach's oceanfront, with plans for tourist-oriented resorts, hotels and a marina outlined in the Ocean Beach Precise Plan. With the passage of a 30 ft (9.1 m) height limit in 1972 and the re-writing of the Precise Plan, the development plans for the waterfront were abandoned.

== Architecture ==
=== Historic district ===
Ocean Beach contains the Ocean Beach Cottage Emerging Historic District consisting of various Craftsman bungalows, cottages and other structures built from 1887 to 1931.

There are a number of other individual San Diego Historic Landmarks in Ocean Beach. Designated city historic landmark buildings are the Ocean Beach Library and Strand Theater.

=== Strand Theater ===
The historic single-screen movie house, the Strand Theater, opened in November 1925. In the late 1970s, the Strand survived with midnight showings of The Rocky Horror Picture Show on Friday and Saturday nights. By the early 1980s it was running pornographic films. Community reaction forced it to change back to regular films. It closed in the 1990s and was converted into a clothing store after several failed attempts to preserve it as a theater. The theater was designated a historic building by the San Diego Historical Resources Board in December 2002.

=== Pier ===
The 1,971-foot (601 m) Ocean Beach Municipal Pier, built in 1966, was the longest concrete pier in the world and the second longest ocean pier in California. The pier was closed in January 2021 due to storm damage. It was partially reopened in May of that year, but its long-term future was uncertain; a 2019 report said the pier had suffered significant deterioration and reached "the end of its useful life". It did reopen for several months in the summer of 2023. That winter it suffered severe damage during a storm and the city subsequently announced plans to demolish and replace it with a new design based on community input. A concrete walkway spans part of the length of the 1 mile (1.6 km) beach.

== Economy ==
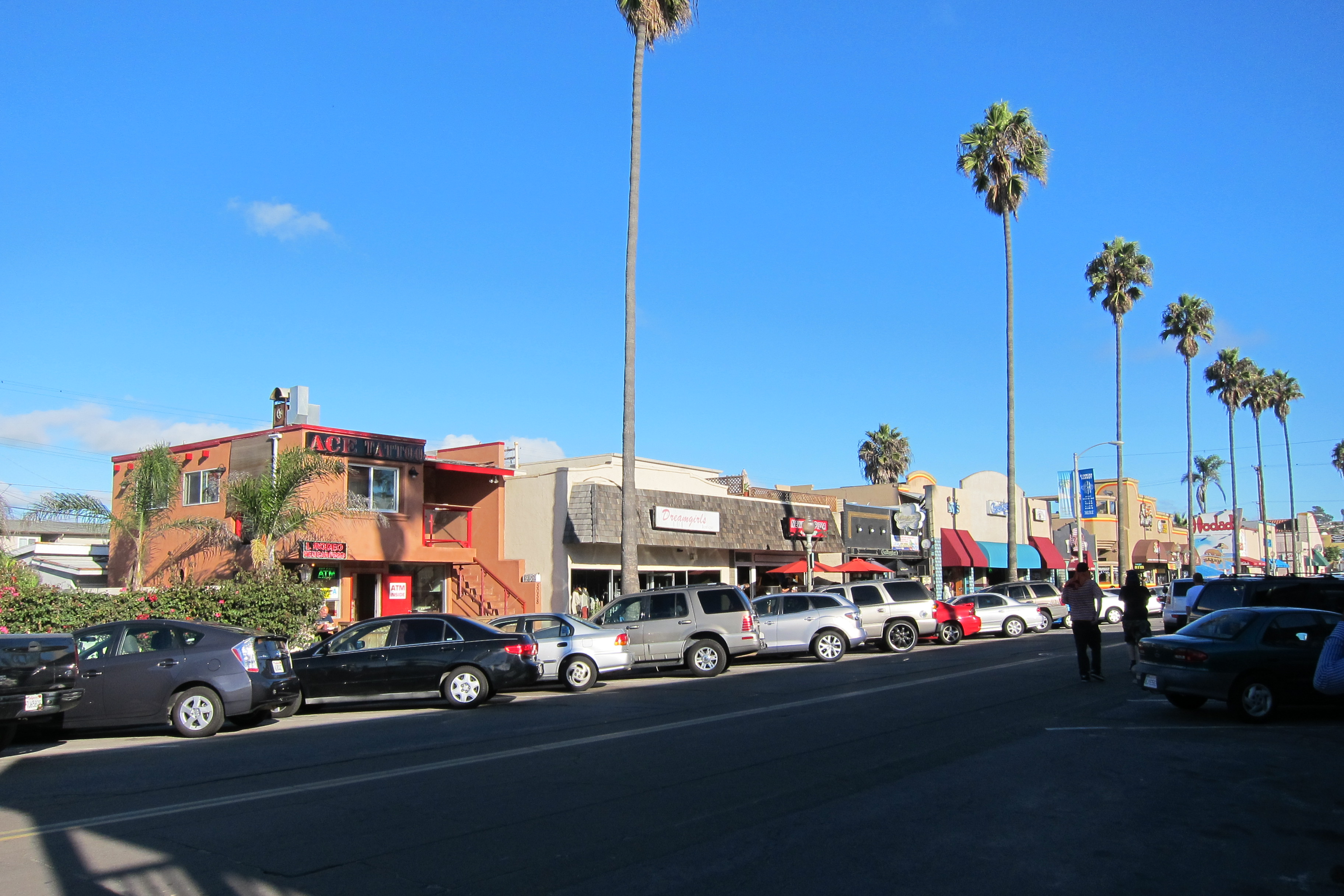
Business district on Newport Avenue

The economy of Ocean Beach is dominated by small, independent retail businesses, including the clothing brand Seedless Clothing. Newport Avenue, the main business street, featured family-owned businesses from the 1930s through the 1960s, such as a bakery, drug stores, a book and novelty shop, a shoe store, men's and women's apparel shops, and a family-owned pet store. In the 1960s and 1970s, larger stores and shopping malls elsewhere in the city gradually ran the small local stores out of business. Many of the storefronts were then turned into antique stores, and the area is now known as the Ocean Beach Antique District. Also on Newport are restaurants, head shops, tattoo and piercing shops, coffee houses, bars, bike and surf shops, and an international youth hostel. In 1969, Hodad's opened on Newport, gaining national attention in 2007 after appearing on Diners, Drive-Ins and Dives. There are several small independent hotels in O.B., but no nationally franchised hotels.

The community has actively opposed chain businesses opening in Ocean Beach, and only a few exist there. In the 1970s, community protests led a chain of donut stores to drop its plans to open a store in O.B. In 2000 an Exxon station abandoned its attempt to open a gas station there. In 2001, an organized grassroots effort attempted unsuccessfully to block Starbucks from opening a coffee shop in Ocean Beach. In 2019, a similar grassroots effort was unsuccessful in stopping Target from moving in on Newport Avenue.

== Community ==
Residents of Ocean Beach often refer to themselves as "OBceans" or "OBecians," which is pronounced "oh-BEE-shun" (although the proper spelling is a matter of dispute).

Ocean Beach has two schools: Ocean Beach Elementary (a K-4 public school) and Warren-Walker (a K-8 private school). The community also features multiple churches, a public library, a U.S. post office, and a vegetarian food co-op. Recreational facilities include the Ocean Beach Recreation Center, Dusty Rhodes Park, and the Robb Field athletic fields and skate park.

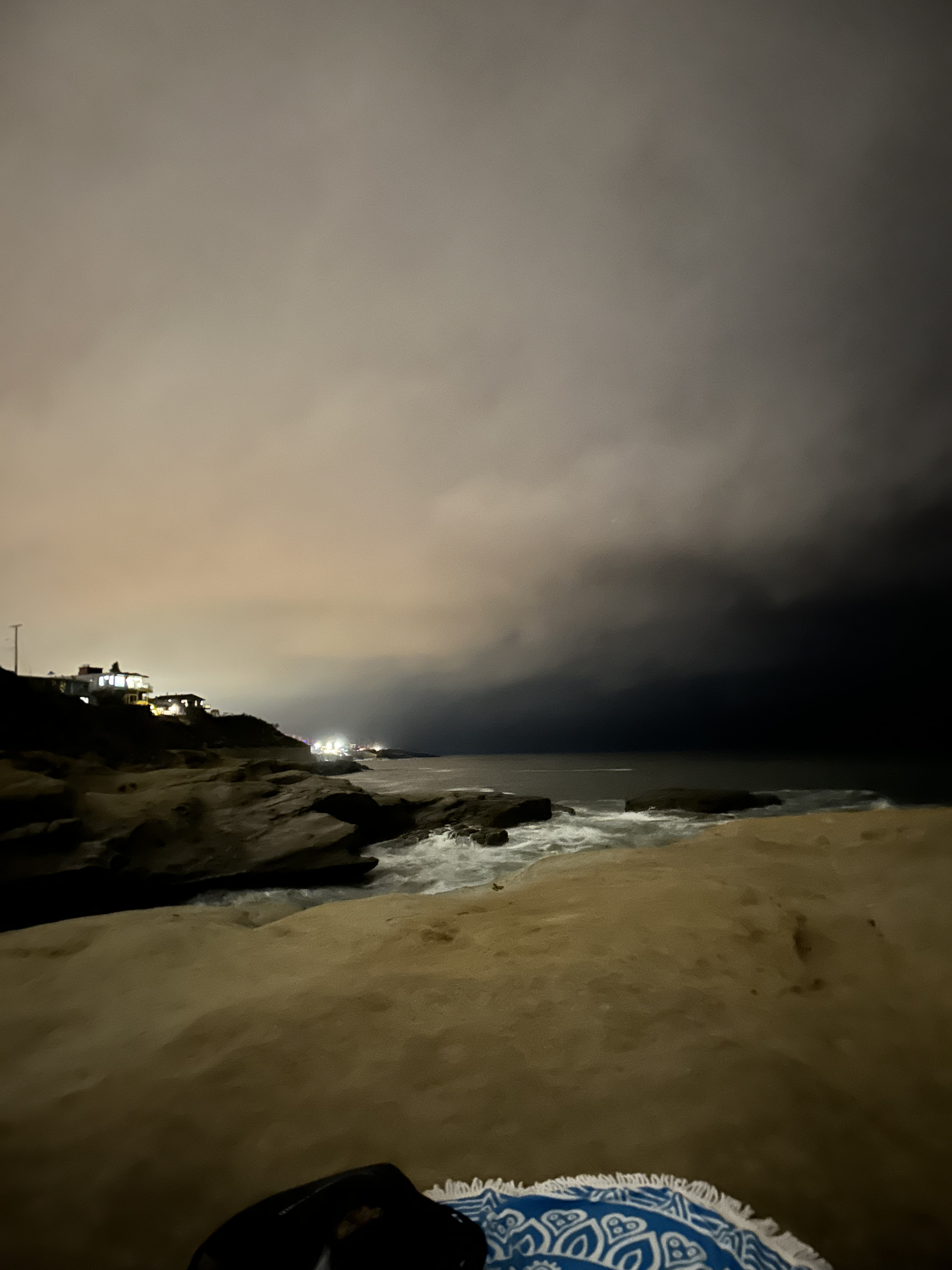
Ocean Beach, San Diego 2024 taken at Santa Cruz Beach

Local events include the Ocean Beach Street Fair and Chili Cookoff in late June, a jazz festival at the foot of Newport in late September, the Ocean Beach Christmas Parade in early December, the Ocean Beach Kite Festival on the third Saturday of May, and the Ocean Beach Canine Carnival on the third Saturday in October. On Wednesday afternoons two blocks of Newport Avenue are closed for a farmers' market.

The northern end of O.B.'s waterfront is known as Dog Beach. It's open 24 hours a day for leash-free dogs and was one of the first such beaches in the United States (founded in 1972).

Ocean Beach and adjacent Point Loma are home to a sizable population of feral parrots and their offspring. The sub-tropical climate is nearly ideal for parrots. The parrots, mostly Amazons, are most active and vocal at sunrise and sunset.

Santa Cruz Ave. is a street in Ocean Beach that begins at a cul-de-sac by Catalina Blvd. and ends at a cliffside that has access to stairs that lead to the beach below. At the bottom is a small cove named Santa Cruz Cove, hidden from other parts of the beach. The cove has access from the Ocean Beach Pier but is only accessible during low tides. On multiple occasions, heavy surf at the cove has swept people out into the water, causing injuries and deaths.

== In popular culture ==
- The television series Terriers and film Mighty Oak were filmed in and set in Ocean Beach.
- The filming location used for the short film The Heiress Lethal was the Old Townhouse Restaurant on Newport Ave.
- Key scenes from the 2000 film Almost Famous were filmed on Newport Ave.

== Notable people ==
Ocean Beach's current and former notable residents, politicians and merchants include:

- Mark Atkinson, actor and filmmaker
- Ashli Babbitt, protester killed in the 2021 United States Capitol attack
- William H. Carlson (1864 – 1937), American politician who gave Ocean Beach its name
- D. C. Collier, developer who opened Ocean Beach to the rest of the world in 1909
- Michael Dormer (born 1935), artist and cartoonist
- Gary Heffern, (1954-2026), punk rock singer and poet, adopted from Finland and taken to Ocean Beach
- Troy Johnson, writer and food critic
- Christine Kehoe (born 1950), California state senator
- Purusha Larkin (1934–1988), filmmaker and author
- Cordelia Mendoza, Ocean Beach merchant, antiques expert
- Andy Rathbone, author of For Dummies books
- John Reis (born 1969), musician and disc jockey
- Slightly Stoopid, a rock band based in Ocean Beach
- David Wells (born 1963), Major League Baseball pitcher
- Michael Zucchet (born 1969), politician, former San Diego City Councilman

== See also ==
- List of San Diego Historic Landmarks in the Point Loma and Ocean Beach areas
- List of beaches in San Diego County
