= Acoustic Roots: Live & Direct =

Live album by Slightly Stoopid
- Released: March 16, 2004
- Recorded: 2001
- Label: Cornerstone RAS

Slightly Stoopid chronology
Everything You Need (2003)	Acoustic Roots: Live & Direct (2004)	Closer to the Sun (2005)

Acoustic Roots: Live & Direct is a live album by the band Slightly Stoopid that was released by Cornerstone RAS in 2004. The album was recorded in 2001, and features Kyle and Miles on guitars and both leading and background vocals. This album was recorded in one take.

== Track listing ==
1. "Cool Down"
  - Lead vocals: Kyle McDonald and Miles Doughty (Backing)
2. "Fire Shot"
  - Lead vocals: Kyle McDonald and Miles Doughty (Backing)
3. "Devil's Door"
  - Lead vocals: Miles Doughty and Kyle McDonald (Backing)
4. "Sensimilla"
  - Lead vocals: Miles Doughty and Kyle McDonald (Backing)
5. "Souled"
  - Lead vocals: Miles Doughty and Kyle McDonald (Backing)
6. "I Couldn't Get High" (The Fugs cover)
  - Lead vocals: Kyle McDonald and Miles Doughty (Backing)
7. "Nico's"
  - Lead vocals: Miles Doughty and Kyle McDonald (Backing)
8. "Mellow Mood"
  - Instrumental
9. "Collie Man"
  - Lead vocals: Miles Doughty and Kyle McDonald (Backing)
10. "Too Little Too Late"
  - Lead vocals: Miles Doughty and Kyle McDonald (Backing and section at the end)
11. "If This World Were Mine" (Dennis Brown cover)
  - Lead vocals: Miles Doughty and Kyle McDonald (Backing)
12. "Sun Is Shining" (Bob Marley & The Wailers cover)
  - Lead vocals: Kyle McDonald and Miles Doughty (Backing)
13. "Wiseman"
  - Lead vocals: Kyle McDonald
14. "I Used To Love Her" (Guns N' Roses cover)
  - Lead vocals: Miles Doughty and Kyle McDonald (Backing)
15. "Prophet"
  - Lead vocals: Miles Doughty
