= Ortiz =

Ortiz (pronounced [oɾˈtiθ]) is a Spanish-language patronymic surname meaning "son of Orti". "Orti" seems to be disputed in meaning, deriving from either Basque, Latin fortis meaning "brave, strong", or Latin fortunius meaning "fortunate". Officials of the Spanish Inquisition in Toledo, Spain, wrote in the 1590s that "this surname Ortiz, although they have few sanbenitos, is in this city a very converso lineage and surname".

== People ==
- Aaron Ortiz (born 1991), U.S. politician, Illinois state Representative
- Abdalá Bucaram Ortiz (born 1952), president of Ecuador 1996–1997
- Abimelec Ortiz (born 2002), Puerto Rican baseball player
- Adalberto Ortiz (1914–2003), Ecuadorian novelist, poet and diplomat
- Aldo Ortiz (a.k.a. Ricky Santana) (born 1960), Mexican professional wrestler
- Alfonso Ortiz (1939–1998), Native American cultural anthropologist
- Alfredo Ortiz, American businessman; president and CEO of Job Creators Network since 2014
- Álvaro Ortiz (footballer) (born 1978), Mexican football player
- Ana Alicia Ortiz (born 1956), Mexican-American actress
- Andersson Ortiz (born 2001), Guatemalan footballer
- Baby Ortiz (1919–1984), Cuban baseball player
- Bernardo Ortiz de Montellano (1899–1949), Mexican writer and Contemporáneos magazine founder
- Beto Ortiz (born 1978), Peruvian-American journalist, TV personality, and writer
- Carlos Ortiz (boxer) (1936–2022), Puerto Rican boxer
- Carlos Julián Ortiz (born 1974), Cuban freestyle wrestler
- Celso Ortiz (born 1989), Paraguayan football player
- Claudette Ortiz (born 1981), American soul singer
- Claudia Ortiz (born 1981), Peruvian beauty pageant winner
- Cristina Ortiz (born 1950), Brazilian pianist
- Daniel Ortiz (disambiguation), multiple people
- Danny Ortiz (1976–2004), Guatemalan football player
- Darwin Ortiz (1948–2023), American gambler, magician, and author
- David Ortiz (born 1975), Dominican baseball player
- Deborah Ortiz (born 1957), American politician, state senator from California
- Desiree Ortiz (born 1981), Venezuelan television host
- Dianna Ortiz (1958–2021), American Roman Catholic nun kidnapped and tortured by the Guatemalan defense forces in 1989
- Diego Ortiz (c. 1510–1580), Spanish composer and music theorist
- Diogo Ortiz de Villegas (1457–1519), Spanish-Portuguese theologian and astronomer
- Domingo Antonio Ortiz (1832-1889), Paraguayan naval officer and supreme court judge
- Domingo Ortiz (born 1952), American musician
- Elín Ortiz (1934–2016), Puerto Rican actor, comedian and producer
- Emmanuel Ortiz (born 1974), Chicano/Puerto Rican/Irish-American activist and poet
- Enrique Ortiz (disambiguation), multiple people
- Enrique Ortiz de Landázuri Izarduy (a.k.a. Enrique Bunbury, born 1967), Spanish singer-songwriter
- Erick Iván Ortiz (born 1991), Salvadoran politician, activist
- Eulalio Martín Gutiérrez Ortiz (1881–1939), president of Mexico 1914–1915
- Félix Ortiz (born 1959), American politician in the New York Assembly
- Fernando Ortiz Fernández (1881–1969), Cuban essayist, ethnomusicologist, and scholar of Afro-Cuban culture
- Fernando Ortiz Arana (born 1944), Mexican politician and legislator
- Francisco Ortiz (born 1986), Spanish actor
- Francisco Ortiz Franco (1954–2004), Mexican journalist
- Francisco Pradilla Ortiz (1848–1921), Spanish artist
- Gerardo Ortiz (born 1989), Mexican singer
- Guillermo Ortiz Martínez (born 1948), governor of the Bank of Mexico
- Guillermo Iberio Ortiz Mayagoitia (born 1941), chief justice of the Supreme Court of Mexico
- Guillermo Rigondeaux Ortiz (born 1980), Cuban boxer
- Héctor Ortiz (disambiguation), multiple people
- Héctor Ortiz Ortiz (born 1950), governor of the Mexican state of Tlaxcala
- Héctor Herrera Ortiz (born 1959), Cuban Olympic medalist (1992) in the 800 meters
- Hilda Clayton (1991–2013), née Ortiz, American U.S. Army combat photographer
- Ismael Ortiz (born 1982), Panamanian swimmer in the 2004 Olympics
- Juan Laurentino Ortiz (1896–1978), Argentine poet
- Junior Ortiz (born 1959), Puerto Rican baseball catcher
- Joell Ortiz (born 1980), American rapper
- John Ortiz (born 1969), American actor and co-founder of LAByrinth Theater Company
- Jorge Ortiz (Argentine footballer) (born 1984)
- Jorge Ortiz (Spanish footballer) (born 1992)
- José Ortiz (disambiguation), numerous individuals
- Josefa Ortiz de Domínguez (a.k.a. La Corregidora) (1768–1829), conspirator and supporter of the Mexican War of Independence
- Juan David Ortiz (born 1983), American serial killer
- Judith Ortiz Cofer (1952–2016), Puerto Rican author
- Leonor de Todos los Santos de Borbón y Ortiz (born 2005), Princess of Asturias
- Letizia Ortiz Rocasolano (born 1972), Queen of Spain
- Lisa Ortiz (born 1974), American voice actress
- Ludwig Ortiz (born 1976), Venezuelan judoka
- Luis Ortiz (disambiguation), multiple people
- Manuel Ortíz de Zárate (1887–1946), Chilean artist
- Manuel Antonio Ortiz (fl. 1840–1841), president of Paraguay 1840–1841
- Marisela Escobedo Ortiz (1958–2010), Mexican social activist, killed while protesting the murder of her daughter
- Martha Ortiz, Mexican chef
- Oliver Ortíz (born 1993), Mexican footballer
- Omar Ortiz (born 1976), Mexican football (soccer) player
- Opie Ortiz (contemporary), American tattoo artist and musician
- Ortiz (wrestler) (born 1991), American professional wrestler
- Oscar Ortiz (born 1953), Argentine football player, and winner of the 1978 World Cup
- Óscar Ortiz (El Salvador) (born 1961), Salvadoran politician
- Óscar Ortiz (tennis) (born 1973), Mexican tennis player
- Pablo Ortiz (disambiguation), multiple people
- Pascual Ortiz Rubio (1877–1963), president of Mexico 1930–1932
- Paul Ortiz (historian) (born 1964), American history professor and author
- Paul Ortiz (musician) (born 1984), British guitarist and musician
- Pedro Ortiz Dávila (a.k.a. Davilita) (1912–1986), Puerto Rican popular singer
- Peter J. Ortiz (1913-1988), Colonel in U.S. Marine Corps who served with OSS in Occupied France
- Ramón Ortiz (born 1973), Dominican baseball player
- Raúl Scalabrini Ortiz (1898–1959), Argentine writer, journalist, essayist, and poet
- Ricky Ortiz or Richard Young (born 1975), American professional wrestler
- Richard Ortiz (born 1990), Paraguayan footballer
- Roberto María Ortiz (1886–1942), president of Argentina 1938–1942
- Russ Ortiz (born 1974), American baseball player
- Shalim Ortiz (born 1979), Puerto Rican/Dominican-American singer and actor
- Solomon P. Ortiz (born 1937), US Representative from Texas
- Stalin Ortiz (born 1981), Colombian basketball player
- Telma Ortiz Rocasolano (born 1973), sister of Letizia, Queen of Spain
- Tito Ortiz (born 1975), American mixed martial arts fighter
- Tony Ortiz, American sportscaster and sports talk show host
- Vergil Ortiz Jr. (born 1998), American boxer
- Victor Ortiz (born 1987), American boxer
- Víctor Manuel Ortiz (1965–2021), Puerto Rican politician
- Xavier Ortiz (1962/72–2020), Mexican actor and singer
- Yolanda Ortiz Espinosa (born 1978), Cuban diver
- Yñigo Ortiz de Retez (fl. 1545), Spanish maritime explorer

== Fictional characters ==
- Brianna Janae Ortiz-Brown from the TV series, Meet the Browns, played by Brianne Gould (Season 1)/Logan Browning (Season 2–5)
- Brianna Ortiz from the 2023 miniseries, Painkiller, played by Ana Cruz Kayne
- Cole Ortiz from the TV series, 24, played by Freddie Prinze Jr.
- Detective Danny Ortiz from the 2014 neo-noir, A Walk Among the Tombstones, played by Maurice Compte
- Damien Ortiz from the TV series, Day Break, played by Ramón Rodríguez
- David Ortiz and Gloria Ortiz Roy from the 2018 Spanish film, Mirage, played by Álvaro Morte and Luna Fulgencio, respectively
- Dr. Diego Ortiz from the 2011 monster movie, Mega Python vs. Gatoroid, played by A Martinez
- General Domingo Ortiz from the 1964 Spaghetti Western, Minnesota Clay, played by Fernando Sancho
- Eddie Ortiz from the 1999 crime thriller, The Bone Collector, played by Luis Guzmán
- Elton Ortiz from the TV series, The Walking Dead: World Beyond, played by Nicolas Cantu
- Gabby Ortiz from the soap opera, Days of Our Lives, played by Gina La Piana
- Gerardo Ortiz-Niño from the TV series, For All Mankind, played by Salvador Chacón
- Guillermo Ortiz from the TV series, Touch, played by Saïd Taghmaoui
- Ivan Ortiz from the TV series, FBI: Most Wanted, played by Miguel Gomez
- "J.A." Ortiz from the TV series, Nothing Sacred, played by José Zúñiga
- Jesus Ortiz from the 1964 drama, The Pawnbroker, played by Jaime Sánchez
- Juice Ortiz from the TV series, Sons of Anarchy, played by Theo Rossi
- Letty Ortiz from the Fast & Furious films, played by Michelle Rodriguez
- Liza Ortiz, in the American television series Fear the Walking Dead
- Lorena Ortiz from the 2021 Spanish miniseries, The Innocent, played by Alexandra Jiménez
- Los Ortiz is an NPC in the Online Game: Dark Age of Camelot. Based on the real life player whose last name is also Ortiz.
- Luisa Ortiz from the TV series, Velvet: El nuevo imperio, played by Jeimy Osorio
- Corporal Manuel Ortiz from the 1956 science fiction film, It Conquered the World, played by Jonathan Haze
- Max Ortiz from the 1984 action thriller, The Evil That Men Do, played by René Enríquez
- Sensor Chief Miguel Ortiz from the TV series, seaQuest DSV, played by Marco Sanchez
- Mike Ortiz from the TV series, Reasonable Doubt, played by Victor Rasuk
- Noelle Ortiz-Stubbs from the soap opera, One Life to Live, played by January LaVoy
- Paco Ortiz from the TV series, Nurses, played by Carlos Lacámara
- Pilar Ortiz from the TV series, El Señor de los Cielos, played by Patricia Vico
- Officer Rachel Ortiz from the TV series, Law & Order: Special Victims Unit, played by Erica Camarano
- Renata Ortiz from the 2022 romantic comedy, Shotgun Wedding, played by Sônia Braga
- Ricky "Buddha" Ortiz and Jackie Ortiz from the TV series, Six, played by Juan Pablo Raba and Nadine Velazquez, respectively
- Det. Rita Ortiz from the TV series, NYPD Blue, played by Jacqueline Obradors
- Dr. Sara Ortiz from the TV series, Grey's Anatomy, played by Melissa DuPrey
- Sophia Ortiz from the TV series, The Steve Harvey Show, played by Tracy Vilar
- Teddy Ortiz from the animated TV series, Big Nate, voiced by Arnie Pantoja
- Teresa Ortiz from the TV series, Boomtown, played by Lana Parrilla
- Valentina "Val" Ortiz, from the 2024 Pixar film Inside Out 2
- Willie Ortiz from the 2012 film, Tiger Eyes, played by Russell Means
- Captain Ortiz, in Dino Buzzati's novel Il deserto dei Tartari (translated as The Tartar Steppe, The Stronghold)
- Colonel Ortiz from the 2025 Peruvian film, Chavín De Huántar: The Rescue of the Century, played by Cristhian Esquivel
- Colonel Ortiz from the 2025 heist film, Play Dirty, played by Hemky Madera
- Detective Ortiz from the 2006 action thriller, 16 Blocks, played by Conrad Pla
- Dr. Ortiz from the 2020 drama, Four Good Days, played by Carlos Lacámara
- Dr. Ortiz from the 2013 erotic thriller, Plush, played by Marlene Forte
- Lieutenant Ortiz from the 1986 action thriller, Blue City, played by Luis Contreras
- In the 1994 action thriller, Speed, one of the bus passengers is named Ortiz, played by Carlos Carrasco

== See also ==
- Comet White–Ortiz–Bolelli, comet discovered in 1970
