= Desire (disambiguation) =

Desire is a sense of longing or hoping. It may also refer to:

== Places ==
- Desire Street, New Orleans, Louisiana
  - Desire (New Orleans streetcar line), an historic streetcar line
  - Desire Area, New Orleans
  - Desire Projects

== People ==
- Désiré, a French male given name
- Désiré (baritone), stage name of French comic baritone Amable Courtecuisse (1823–1873)
- Desire (wrestler), American professional wrestler

== Arts and entertainment ==
=== Films ===
- Desire (1920 film), a British film directed by George Edwardes-Hall
- Desire (1921 film), a German film directed by F.W. Murnau
- Desire (1923 film), an American film directed by directed by Rowland V. Lee
- Desire (1936 film), an American film starring Marlene Dietrich and Gary Cooper
- Desire (1946 Italian film), an Italian film directed by Marcello Pagliero and Roberto Rossellini
- Desire (1946 Swedish film), a Swedish film directed by Edvin Adolphson
- Desire (1958 film), a Czech film directed by Vojtěch Jasný
- Desire (1968 film), a South Korean film featuring Kim Ji-mee
- Desire (1974 film), a Hong Kong film starring Tony Liu
- Desire (1982 film), a Filipino-American film directed by Eddie Romero
- Desire (1993 film), an American film starring Kate Hodge
- Desire (2000 film), featuring Martin Donovan
- Desire (2009 film), a film by Welsh director Gareth Jones
- Desire (2017 film) an Argentine film starring Pampita
- Desires (film), a 1952 German film
- Q (2011 film), a French erotic drama starring Déborah Révy released in the USA as Desire
- The Desire (2010 film), an Indo-Chinese feature film
- The Desire (1944 film) (El deseo), an Argentine drama film
- Desired (film), a 1951 Mexican drama film

=== Music ===
==== Groups and labels ====
- Desire (band), a Canadian electronic act

==== Albums ====
- Desire (Bob Dylan album), 1976
- Desire (Grace Kennedy album), 1979
- Desire (Hurts album), 2017
- Desire (French Affair album), 2001
- Desire (Iyanya album), 2013
- Desire (Pharoahe Monch album), also the title song
- Desire (Tom Scott album), also the title song
- Desire (Toyah album), also the title song
- Desire (Tuxedomoon album), also the title song
- Desire, by BZN

==== Songs ====
- "Desire" (Andy Gibb song), 1980
- "Desire" (Calvin Harris and Sam Smith song), 2023
- "Desire" (Claudette Pace song)
- "Desire" (Darin song), 2007
- "Desire" (Do As Infinity song), 2001
- "Desire" (Geri Halliwell song), 2005
- "Desire" (Luna Sea song), 1995
- "Desire" (Ought song), 2018
- "Desire" (Ryan Adams song), 2002
- "Desire" (U2 song), 1988
- "Desire" (Years & Years song), 2014
- "Desire", by Akina Nakamori
- "Desire", by Ateez from Treasure EP.2: Zero to One
- "Desire", by D-Block Europe
- "Desire", by En Vogue from Funky Divas
- "Desire", by Fontaines D.C. from Romance
- "Desire", by The Gaslight Anthem from Handwritten
- "Desire", by Modest Mussorgsky
- "Desire", by Holly Valance from State of Mind
- "Desire", by Meg Myers from Make a Shadow
- "Desire", by Ozzy Osbourne from No More Tears
- "Desire", by Slayer from Diabolus in Musica
- "Desire", by Poets of the Fall from Carnival of Rust
- "Desire", by Raheem DeVaughn from Love Behind the Melody
- "Desire", by Roni Griffith
- "Desire", by Suicide Commando from Construct-Destruct
- "Desire", by Talk Talk from Spirit of Eden
- "Desire", by Toad the Wet Sprocket from Coil
- "Desire", by Tove Lo and SG Lewis from Heat
- "Desire", by Vassy
- "Desire", by Yanni from Dare to Dream
- "Desire", by Yello from Stella
- "Desires", by Drake from Dark Lane Demo Tapes

=== Television ===
- Desire (TV series), an American telenovela
- "Desire", an episode of Grey's Anatomy
- Desires, a Taiwanese drama broadcast on Sanlih E-Television

=== Other arts and entertainment ===
- Desire (DC Comics), a fictional character in The Sandman comic series
- Desire (manga), a yaoi manga written by Maki Kazumi and illustrated by Yukine Honami
- Desire (video game), a Japanese video game
- Desiré, an Old French Breton lai or rhymed tale

== Ships ==
- Desire (ship), a ship sailed by 16th-century explorers Thomas Cavendish and John Davis
- USS Desire (SP-786), a United States Navy patrol boat in commission from 1917 to 1919

== Other uses ==
- HTC Desire, an Android-based phone by HTC

== See also ==
- Desiree (disambiguation)
- Desirable (disambiguation)
- Crave (disambiguation)
- Greed (disambiguation)
- Hunger (disambiguation)
