= Désiré (disambiguation) =

Désiré is a French male given name.

Désiré may also refer to:

- Désiré (baritone) (1823–1873), French baritone
- Désiré (video game), a French adventure video game
- Désiré (1996 film), a French film
- Désiré (1937 film), a French comedy film
- Desiré or Désiré, an Old French Breton lai

== See also ==
- Desire (disambiguation)
