= Desiderata (disambiguation) =

"Desiderata" is an early 1920s poem by Max Ehrmann.

Desiderata or Desideratum may also refer to:

== Books ==
- Desiderata (Mercier Descloux book), an artist's book by Lizzy Mercier Descloux
- The Desideratum; or, Electricity Made Plain and Useful, a book by John Wesley
- Desiderata Hollow, a fictional character in Witches Abroad by Terry Pratchett
- Desiderata Street, a fictional road within Freeside, a space station in "Neuromancer" by William Gibson

== Music ==
- Desideratum, a cornet model made by Besson

=== Classical compositions ===
- "Desiderata nobis", motet by Giacomo Carissimi
- Symphony No. 4, 'Desiderata' by Jaroslav Krček
- Symphony No. 6, Op. 70 'Desiderata' by Carlos Veerhoff

=== Albums ===
- Desiderata (Les Crane album), a 1971 spoken word album with music composed by Fred Werner
- Desiderata (Madder Mortem album), a 2006 progressive metal album
- Desideratum (Synæsthesia album), a 1995 ambient album by Synæsthesia
- Desideratum (Anaal Nathrakh album), a 2014 extreme metal album

=== Songs ===
- "Desiderata" (Les Crane song), a 1971 reading of the poem and title track of the Grammy winning album
- "Desiderata", a song on the 2004 Lazyboy album Lazyboy TV
- "Desiderata", a song on the 2006 The Human Abstract album Nocturne
- "Desiderata", a song on the 2024 Mary Halvorson album Cloudward

== People ==
- Desiderata of the Lombards (fl. 771), a queen consort of the Franks

== Other uses ==
- Desiderata, plural of a desideratum, the objects of desire
- Desiderata of the Lombards (fl. 770–771), wife of Charlemagne
- Kerckhoffs's desiderata
- 344 Desiderata, a main belt asteroid
- Desideratum, a horse which won the Prix du Lys in 2006
- Desiderata Valley, a fictional neighborhood in The Sims 2: FreeTime

== See also ==
- Desirable (disambiguation)
