= 9th Ward of New Orleans =

Coordinates: 30.047°N 89.885°W

Map of ward boundaries

The Ninth Ward or 9th Ward is a distinctive region of New Orleans, Louisiana, which is located in the easternmost downriver portion of the city. It is geographically the largest of the 17 wards of New Orleans. On the south, the Ninth Ward is bounded by the Mississippi River. On the western or "upriver" side, the Ninth Ward is bounded by (going from the River north to Lake Pontchartrain) Franklin Avenue, then Almonaster Avenue, then People's Avenue. From the north end of People's Avenue the boundary continues on a straight line north to Lake Pontchartrain; this line is the boundary between the Ninth and the city's Eighth Ward. The Lake forms the north and northeastern end of the ward. St. Bernard Parish is the boundary to the southeast, Lake Borgne farther southeast and east, and the end of Orleans Parish to the east at the Rigolets.

While there is substantial overlap, the 9th Ward should not be confused with city planning designation of the ninth planning district of New Orleans. The 9th Ward includes land in planning districts 7, 8, 10, and 11 (not to be confused with New Orleans East, the 7th, 8th, 10th, and 11th wards).

Among the famous natives and residents of the 9th Ward are music legend Fats Domino, rapper Magic, NBA player Eldridge Recasner, NFL player Marshall Faulk, authors Kalamu ya Salaam and Poppy Z. Brite, actor John Larroquette, trumpeter Kermit Ruffins, and the prominent Batiste musical family.

From 2012 to 2016, the 9th Ward was represented in the Louisiana House of Representatives by Democrat Wesley T. Bishop. When Bishop was elected in 2015 to the Louisiana State Senate, another Democrat, Jimmy Harris, a lawyer and long-term government employee, filled the District 99 state House seat.

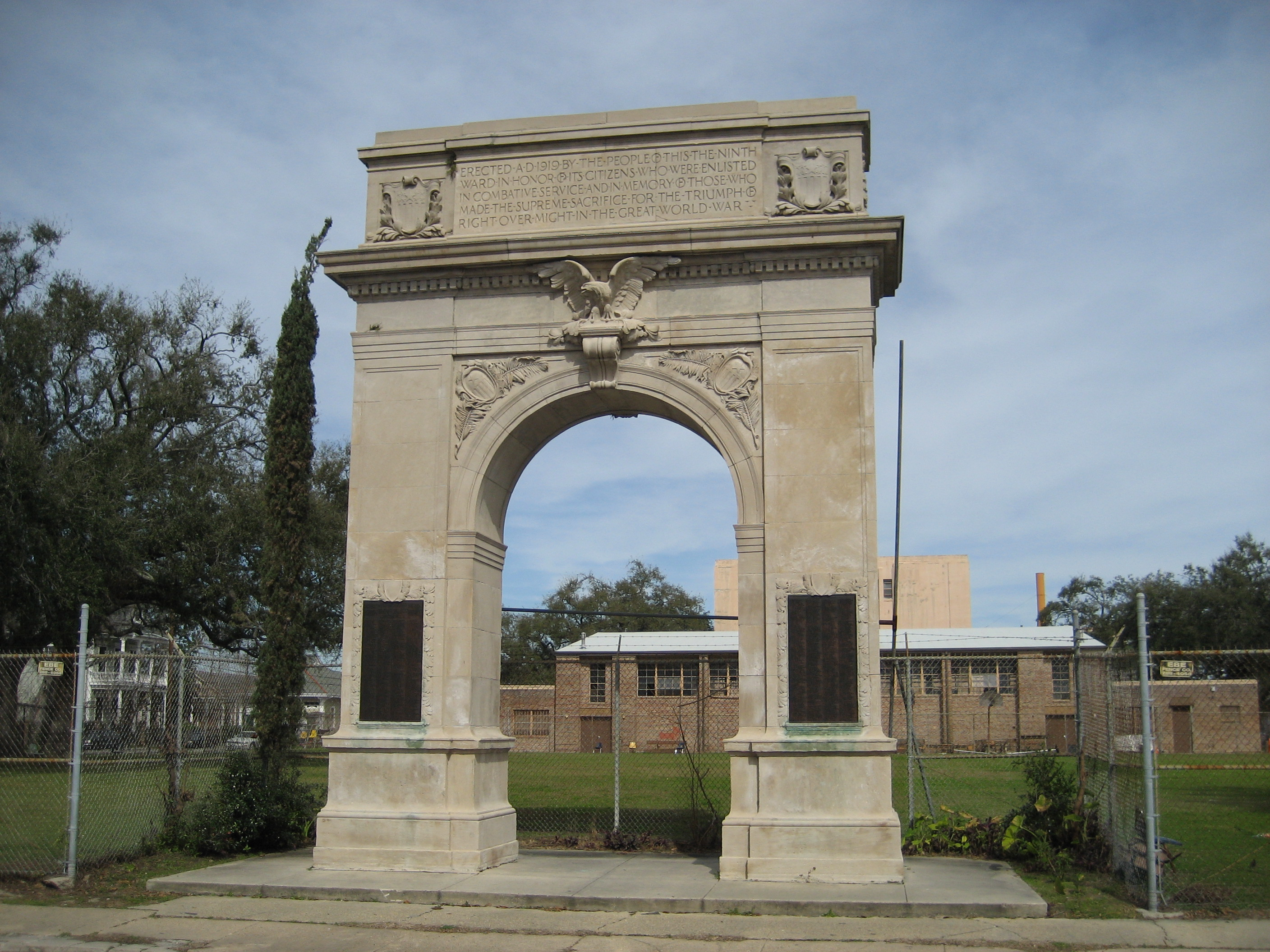
A monument arch specifically commemorating all 9th Warders who served in World War I stands in the Bywater neighborhood of the 9th Ward.

== Sections and neighborhoods ==
The Ninth Ward can broadly be divided into three sections, from where the ward is divided from north to south by the Industrial Canal, and where the area east of the Industrial Canal is divided east to west by the Gulf Intracoastal Waterway/Mississippi River Gulf Outlet.

=== Lower 9th Ward ===
The smallest of these pieces is the area south and east of these canals. The portion of the Ninth Ward along the river downriver from the Industrial Canal stretching to the St. Bernard line is called the "Lower 9th Ward" or "Lower Ninth". It includes the Holy Cross neighborhood, the twin Doullut Steamboat Houses and the Jackson Barracks. Until Hurricane Katrina, the Lower Ninth Ward had the highest percentage of black homeownership in the city.

=== Upper 9th Ward ===
The area west of or "above" the Canal has sometimes been called the "Upper Ninth Ward." Such distinctions arose when the Industrial Canal bisected the neighborhood in the 1920s. The portion of the Ninth Ward along the riverfront between Faubourg Marigny and the Industrial Canal is known as Bywater.

Further back are the infamous St. Claude and Florida area and Desire neighborhood. This part of the Ward contained two of the housing projects of New Orleans. The Desire neighborhood was home to the notorious Desire Projects, until they were demolished concurrent with HOPE VI policy. Just across Florida Avenue from that is where the Florida Projects once stood. Nearby was the Agriculture Street Landfill, an old city dump that was covered over and made into a neighborhood of low-income housing, then became a Superfund toxic cleanup site.

Neighborhoods in the Upper 9th Ward include:

- St. Claude
- Bywater
- Florida
- Desire

=== Eastern New Orleans ===
The largest portion of the 9th Ward is the section to the east of the Industrial Canal and north of MRGO. See: New Orleans East

== History ==
The area along the riverfront was developed first, at the start of the 19th century, followed by the natural highland along Gentilly Ridge.

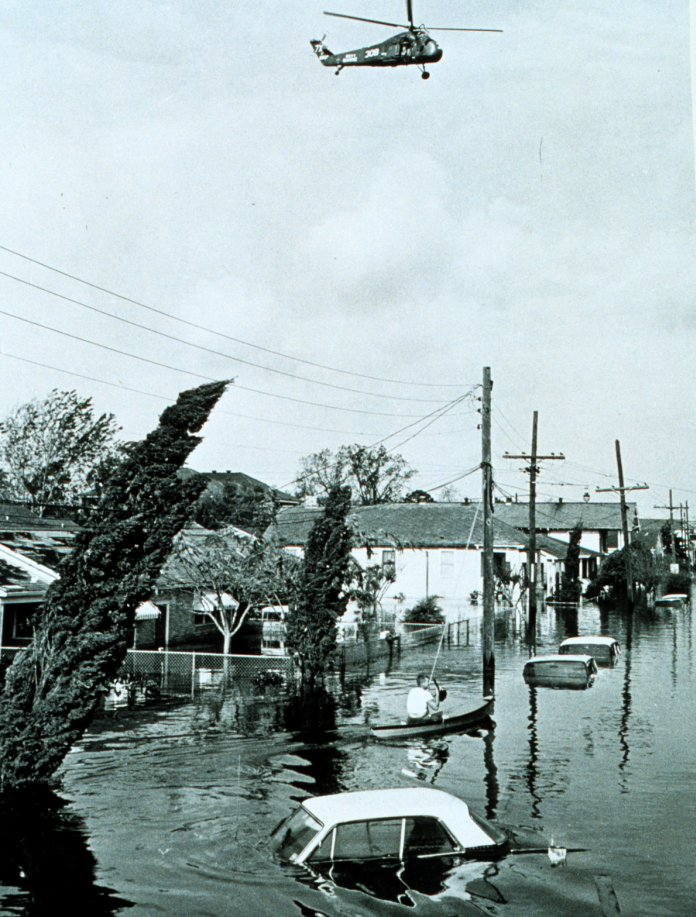
Flooding after Betsy, 1965

The designation of this area as the "9th Ward" dates from 1852 when the wards of New Orleans were redrawn as part of the reorganization of the city from three municipalities into one centralized city government.

Along the lakefront were various fishing camps built on piers, the most famous collection being Little Woods. Such camps were common along the lakefront in the 19th and early 20th century, but the collection at Little Woods was the longest-lasting concentration, many surviving until Hurricane Georges in 1998.

The area of the 9th Ward on the backside of St. Claude Avenue experienced the city's most significant and longest-standing flooding from the New Orleans Hurricane of 1915 due to a break in the protection levee at Florida Avenue.

The Industrial Canal was dredged through the neighborhood at the start of the 1920s.

Most of the area between Gentilly Ridge and Lake Pontchartrain was a swamp, not drained and developed until the mid and late 20th century.

Lincoln Beach was an amusement park along the lakefront for Black people during the era of racial segregation. The nearby "Pontchartrain Beach" was the corresponding amusement area for whites.

Parts of the 9th Ward flooded during Hurricane Flossy in 1956, and the Lower 9th Ward experienced catastrophic flooding in Hurricane Betsy in 1965.

=== Civil rights ===
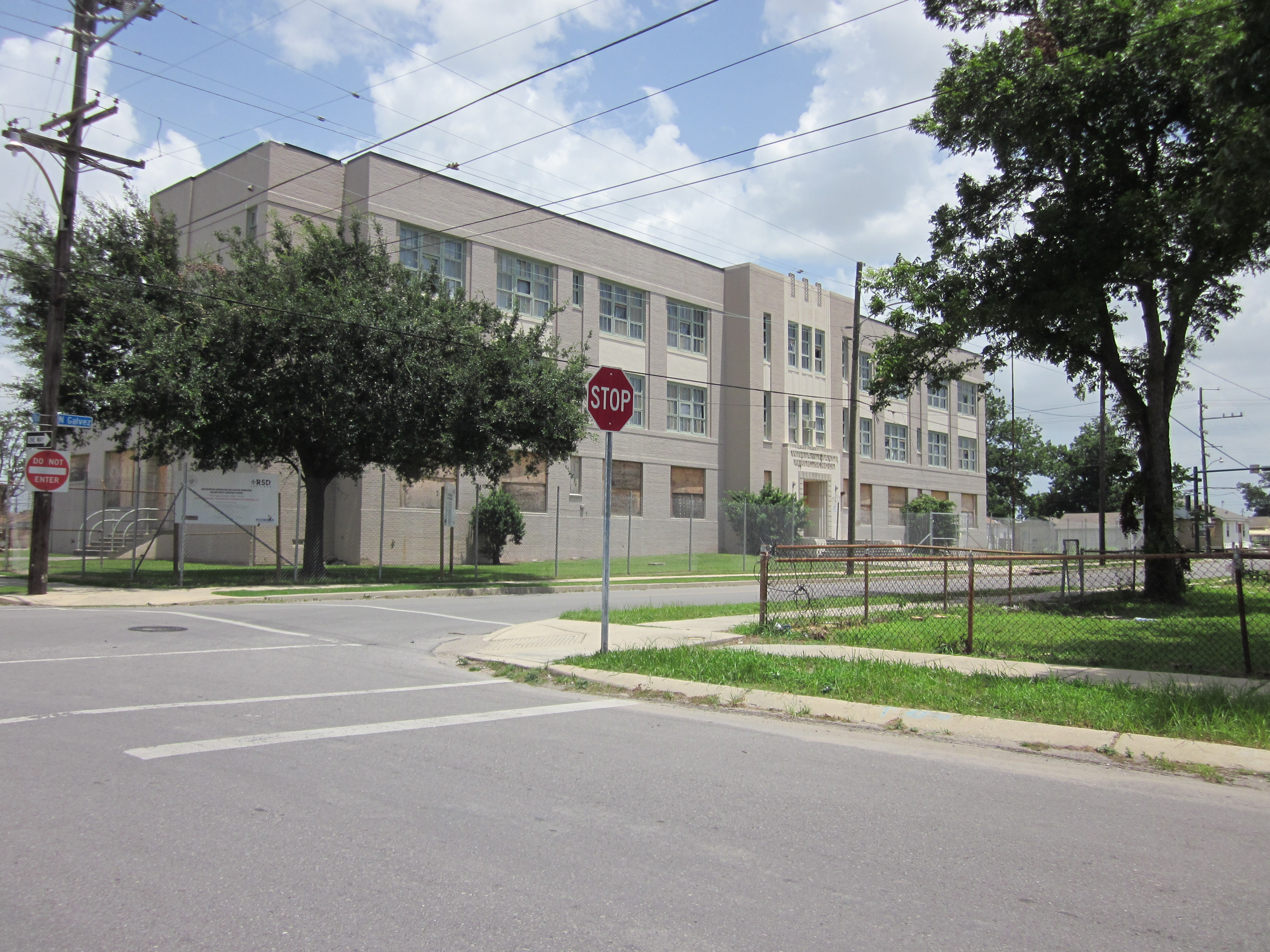
The school a young Ruby Bridges found herself integrating into at the peak of the Civil Rights Movement.

In 1960, the Ninth Ward found itself once again being a topic of discussion when Ruby Bridges became the first black student to attend the then all-white Willam Frantz Elementary School, thus launching the New Orleans school desegregation crisis. While the school has since become a charter, the school community has managed to honor her with a statue on campus and preserve the classroom she attended.

=== Hurricane Katrina ===
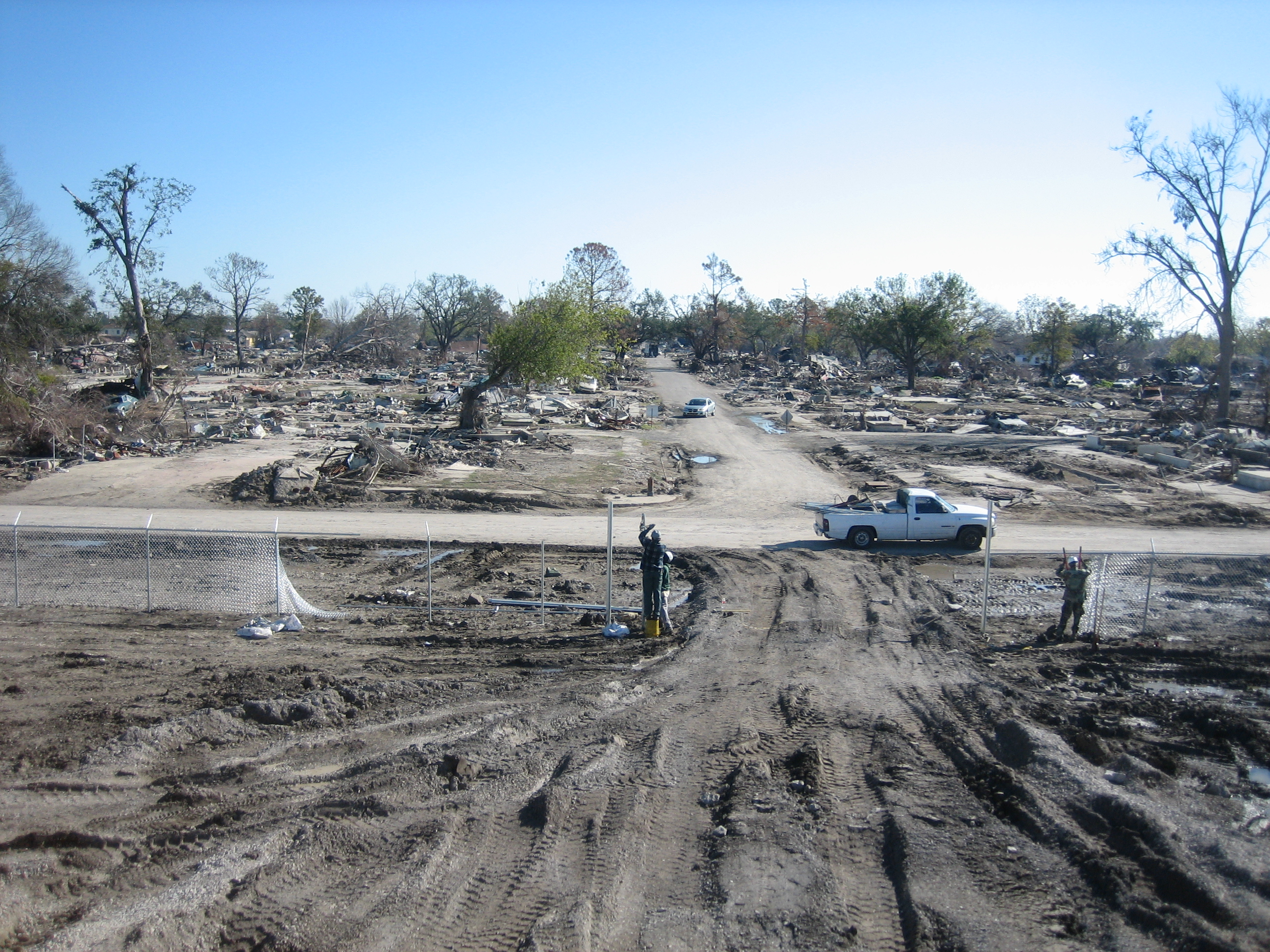
22 December 2005 view inland from the inner (southern) of the two major breaches in the lower side of the Industrial Canal levee & floodwall into the Lower 9th Ward, one of the more famous of the multiple levee failures which devastated much of the Ward at the time of Hurricane Katrina

The 9th Ward neighborhood was thrust into the nation's spotlight in the aftermath of 2005's Hurricane Katrina. Much of the area on both sides of the Industrial Canal experienced catastrophic flooding. The majority of the damage was caused by storm surge. There were multiple severe levee breaks along both the MRGO and the Industrial Canal.

Eastern New Orleans was flooded from multiple sources. The most severe was due to multiple breaches in the MRGO to the south. Some heavy waves during the storm topped the lake level to the north, which may have contributed to the flooding in some places. Lakefront Airport, outside the main protection levees, was heavily damaged by the surge from Lake Pontchartrain. Some water also overtopped a section of the Industrial Canal levee. Most of Eastern New Orleans experienced flooding, generally all areas except the Gentilly/Chef Menteur Ridge and Michoud areas.

The Upper Ninth was flooded by the levee and floodwall failures near the Desire neighborhood, across the Industrial Canal from the junction with the MRGO. Flooding in this part of the ward joined with that of the bulk of the city's east bank to the west, with water flowing in from the London Avenue Canal breaches. The old high ground of the section of Bywater on the Mississippi River side of St. Claude Avenue was the only substantial neighborhood to escape significant flooding. A few areas on the very highest part of Gentilly Ridge and along the lakefront fill were also above the floodwaters.

The Lower Ninth Ward flooded most catastrophically, with storm surge coming through two large breaches in the Industrial Canal flood protection system, creating violent currents that not only flooded buildings but smashed them and displaced them from their foundations. Floodwaters propelled the barge ING 4727 into the neighborhood on the other side of the levee from the Industrial Canal.

During several days of the hurricane aftermath, live television news coverage from reporters and anchors who had little familiarity with New Orleans frequently included misinformation, such as referring to the Lower 9th Ward simply as "the 9th Ward" and misidentifying helicopter shots of the Industrial Canal breach as the 17th Street Canal breach (which was actually at the nearly opposite end of the city.)

The Lower 9th Ward, not yet dry from Katrina, was re-flooded by Hurricane Rita a month later.

During Mardi Gras 2006, the 9th Ward was a popular spot for visitors. The national attention the area received due to the hurricane and the events following the disaster provided Carnival revelers with an additional destination during their celebration. Visitors, however, were not the only ones to venture into the area. Locals flocked to the devastated neighborhoods of the ward as well. Hundreds of people gathered near the Florida housing project in the Ninth Ward on Fat Tuesday. In the quasi-celebratory spirit of a jazz funeral, many residents made their first trip back to take part in a massive block party in their former neighborhood.

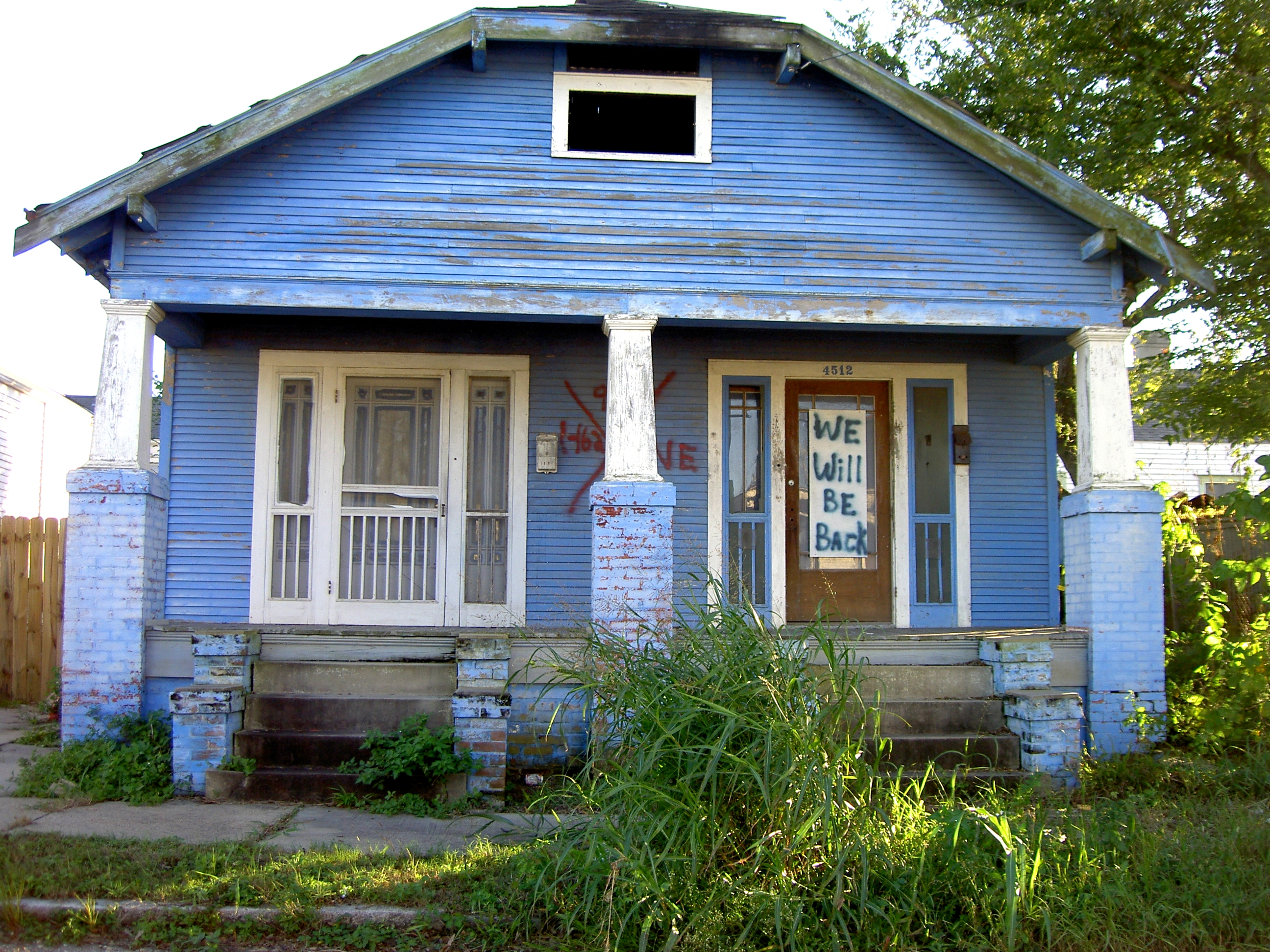
Blue house on N. Robertson St., Upper 9th Ward. The door reads, "We will be back."

Since Katrina, the 9th Ward has witnessed an uneven resurgence, with the Vietnamese community in New Orleans East establishing themselves as a dining destination and commercial hub, even as Vietnamese and other fishermen further down the Parish are suffering from the Deepwater Horizon oil spill of April 20, 2010, and despite 2010 layoffs at NASA's Michoud Assembly Facility with the retirement of the space shuttle fleet. However, the Michoud Assembly Facility continues to be a source of employment as it is the site of fabrication of the core stage of the Space Launch System.

Roads in the 9th Ward continue to improve. Streets neglected for years before Katrina have been resurfaced, such as St. Claude Avenue and Poland Avenue, Chartres Street and parts of Desire Street, but numerous smaller neighborhood roads remain a patchwork of potholes and uneven dips and humps.

=== 2015 shooting ===
A shooting took place at Bunny Friend playground on November 22, 2015. In conjunction with the shooting of an impromptu music video at a block party, 17 people were injured.

== Education ==
In the Ward, New Orleans Public Schools, schools of the Recovery School District, and charter public schools operate. Dr. King Charter School (K-12) is located in the Lower Ninth Ward; Carver High School is located in the Ninth Ward.

Alfred Lawless High School was the only public high school that operated in the Lower 9th until Hurricane Katrina in August 2005. The previous Holy Cross High School campus was located in the Lower Ninth Ward. In August 2007 students from Carver and Marshall Middle School began studying at temporary trailers on the site of Holy Cross.

== See also ==
- Wards of New Orleans
