= Desire Street =

Street in New Orleans, Louisiana, U.S.

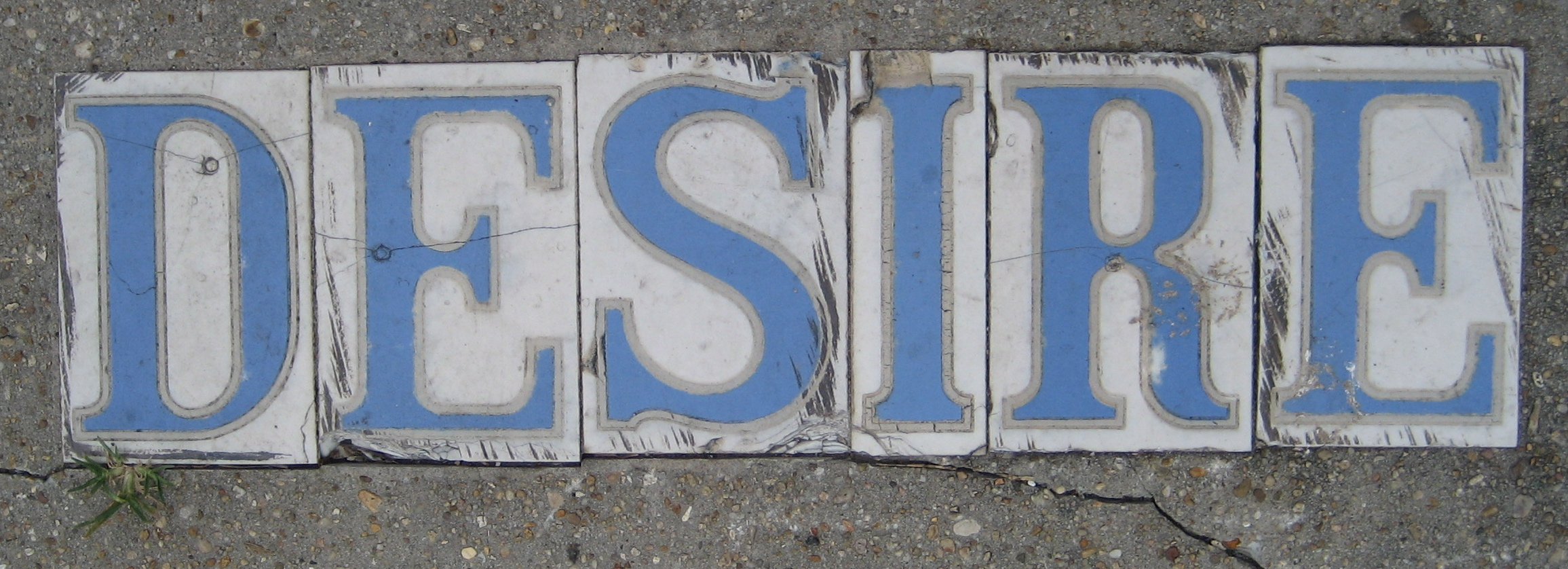
Desire street tiles, Bywater neighborhood

Desire Street is a street in New Orleans, Louisiana, in the United States. In his 1949 book Frenchmen, Desire, Good Children, and Other Streets of New Orleans, John Churchill Chase claims the street is named for Désirée Gautier Montrieul, the daughter of Robert Gautier de Montrieul, who owned the plantation on the land where the street now lies. She married François de La Barre, for whom Labarre Road in Metairie, Louisiana is named. Her sister, Elmire de Montrieul, also had a street named after her, which was itself anglicized as Elmire Street; however, it was renamed to Gallier Street c. 1895.

Jed Horne, author of the 2005 book Desire Street: a true story of death and deliverance in New Orleans, suggests the name is a misspelled homage to Désirée Clary, a fiancée of Napoleon. The play A Streetcar Named Desire, by Tennessee Williams, refers to the former streetcar line to this street. The Desire neighborhood in the Upper Ninth Ward is named after the street, as are the area's Desire Projects, although the housing development has been razed and replaced with smaller apartment buildings. Since Hurricane Katrina, most of the apartments are abandoned and in disrepair.

== See also ==
- Desire Area, New Orleans
- List of streets of New Orleans
- Streetcars in New Orleans
