= President Ortiz =

President Ortiz may refer to:

- Manuel Antonio Ortiz, president of Paraguay from 1840 to 1841
- Eulalio Martin Gutierrez Ortiz, president of Mexico from 1914 to 1915
- Pascual Ortiz Rubio, president of Mexico from 1930 to 1932
- Roberto Marcelino Ortiz, president of Argentina from 1938 to 1942
- Abdalá Bucaram Ortiz, president of Ecuador from 1996 to 1997

== See also ==
- Ortiz
