= Désirée =

Désirée or Desiree or variation, may refer to:

- Désirée (given name), a female given name

== People ==
- Des'ree (born 1968), British pop/soul vocalist throughout the 1990s
- Desiree Barboza, Venezuelan politician
- Desireé Bassett (born 1992), American hard rock guitarist
- Desiree Becker (born 1994), German politician
- Desiree Burch (born 1979), American comedian and television host
- Désirée Clary (1777–1860), Queen of Sweden, 1818–1844
- Désirée Cousteau (born 1956), American porn star
- Desiree Gould (1945–2021), American actress
- Desiree Heslop (born 1961), British singer also known by the stage name Princess
- Desiree Horton (born 1971), nicknamed "Chopper Chick", Los Angeles helicopter pilot/TV reporter and United States Forest Service helicopter firefighter
- Désirée Malonga (born 1981), Afro-Romanian actress and model
- Desiree Morton, American politician
- Désirée Nosbusch (born 1965), Luxembourgish actress and TV host
- Desiree Ortiz, Venezuelan television host
- Desirée Rogers (born 1959), White House Social Secretary
- Desiree Van Oosting, American politician
- Desiree Washington (born 1973), beauty pageant contestant
- Desi-Rae Young (born 2002), American basketball player
- Anne Désirée Ouloto (born 1966), Ivorian politician
- Princess Désirée, Baroness Silfverschiöld (1938–2026), Swedish princess

=== Fictional characters ===
- Desiree DeVere, a fictional former Miss Botswana on the comedy sketch Little Britain
- Desiree Francisco, a character from Philippine drama series Mara Clara
- Desiree (Danny Phantom), a villain on the Nickelodeon cartoon Danny Phantom

== Arts and entertainment ==
- Désirée (film), a 1954 film about Désirée Clary starring Marlon Brando
- Désirée (operetta), an 1884 operetta by John Philip Sousa

=== Songs ===
- "Désiree", a song originally recorded by The Charts in 1957 as "Deserie", and in 1971 recorded by Laura Nyro on the album Gonna Take a Miracle
- "Desiree" (song), a 1977 song by Neil Diamond
- "Desiree", a song by The Left Banke
- "Desiree", a song by American heavy metal band Savatage, released on the 1997 Edel re-release of Streets: A Rock Opera
- "Desiree", a song by Caribou from the album Andorra
- "Desiree", a song by Mohsen Chavoshi from the album Boatless Oar

== Other ==
- Désirée potato, a red-skinned variety of potato
- Désirée, a white mare ridden by Napoleon during the Waterloo Campaign
- French frigate Désirée

== See also ==
- Désiré, a French male given name
- Désiré (baritone), stage name of French comic baritone Amable Courtecuisse (1823–1873)
- Desire (disambiguation)
