= Axis of evil (disambiguation) =

Axis of evil is a term used by George W. Bush to describe governments that he accused of sponsoring terrorism and seeking weapons of mass destruction.

Axis of evil may also refer to:

== Other political history ==
- The Axis powers, the faction from World War II which Bush's use of the term was based on the precedent of.
- The Axis of Upheaval consisting of China, Russia, Iran and North Korea, or (CRINK), designated by subsequent American politicians in the spirit of Bush's terminology.

== Cosmology ==
- Axis of evil (cosmology), an anomaly in the temperature distribution of the cosmic microwave background radiation

== Media and entertainment ==
- Axis of Evil (album), a 2003 album by Suicide Commando
- Axis of Evil (film), a 2004 French film
- Axis of Evil Comedy Tour, a 2005-2007 stand-up comedy tour featuring Middle-Eastern comedians
- Behind Enemy Lines II: Axis of Evil, a 2006 war film
- "Axis of Evil", the 2010 two-part finale of Season 1 of the TV show Hot Wheels Battle Force 5
- Puppet Master: Axis of Evil, a 2010 horror film

== See also ==
- "Axes of Evil", a song by 3 Inches of Blood on their album Advance and Vanquish
- Axis (disambiguation)
