= Implement =

Implement may refer to:

- Implements (Java), an abstract type used to specify an interface in Java supporting
- Implementation, the process for putting a design, plan or policy into effect
- Tool, any physical item that can be used to achieve a goal
  - Farm implement, machinery used in agriculture
  - Kitchen implement, utensils used in preparing or eating food
  - Writing implement, a tool used to produce writing

== See also ==
- Implements of Hell, an album by the Belgian aggrotech act Suicide Commando
- Implementer (disambiguation)
