= Critical Stage =

Studio album by Suicide Commando
- Released: 1994
- Genre: Industrial
- Label: Off Beat

Suicide Commando chronology
Critical Stage (1994)	Stored Images (1995)

Critical Stage is the 1994 debut album by the Belgian electro-industrial act Suicide Commando.

== Track listing ==
All songs written by Johan Van Roy, except where noted

No.	Track	Length
1.	"Critical Stage"	4:19
2.	"Sheer Horror"	5:16
3.	"H.I.V. +"	4:09
4.	"Traumatize"	3:43
5.	"So Many Questions"	4:28
6.	"Time"	4:16
7.	"Fate"	4:37
8.	"Necrophilia"	3:49
9.	"Revenge"	4:55
10.	"Where Do We Go From Here?" (Van Roy, Dirk Ivens)	4:15
11.	"Under God's Eye"	4:54
12.	"The Dreamhouse (Mental Version)"	2:53
