= Suicide Commando =

Belgian electro-industrial music act

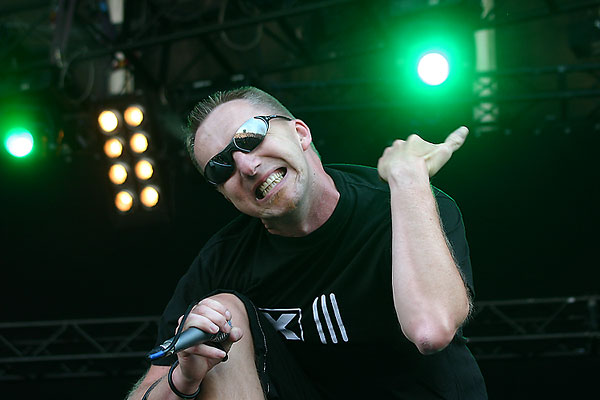
- Johan van Roy

Background information
- Origin: Leopoldsburg, Belgium
- Genres: Electro-industrial; EBM; aggrotech
- Years active: 1986–present
- Labels: OffBeat; Dependent; Noise Terror Productions; Metropolis; Out of Line
- Spinoffs: Kombat Unit
- Members: Johan van Roy (all music & vocals); Torben Schmidt (live keys); Mario Vaerewijck (live drums)
- Website: suicidecommando.be

Suicide Commando is a Belgian electro-industrial music act formed by Johan Van Roy in 1986. For live shows, it consists of Van Roy himself on vocals, Torben Schmidt on keyboards, and Mario Vaerewijck on drums.

== History ==
Van Roy began experimenting with electronic music back in 1986. Two years later, he released his first tape under the moniker Suicide Commando, and his track appeared on the vinyl compilation Electronic. He continued to release more tapes until he was signed by the rising German label Off Beat. Van Roy's first album, Critical Stage, was released in 1994. The following year, he released a second album, Stored Images, which contains one of his most popular songs, "See You in Hell". In 1996, he released the compilation album Contamination for the act's tenth anniversary.

In 1998, Suicide Commando released the album Construct-Destruct and its sister release, Reconstruction, which included the new club hits "Desire" and "Better Off Dead".

Van Roy was one of the founders of the Dependent label in 1999. It was on this new label that Suicide Commando's next releases, the singles "Hellraiser" and "Comatose Delusion" and the EP Love Breeds Suicide, accompanied Suicide Commando's 2000 release, Mindstrip. Mindstrip reached number one on the German alternative chart (DAC). It was licensed and released in North America by Metropolis Records. In 2002, Suicide Commando released the DCD Anthology on Dependent, a "best of" compilation, which included the band's biggest hits "Hellraiser", "See You in Hell", "Love Breeds Suicide", and offered some exclusive new remixes and rare versions.

Suicide Commando's next release, Axis of Evil, was voted album of the year (2003) by the Deutsche Alternative Charts (DAC). In 2006, Suicide Commando returned with the album Bind, Torture, Kill, which was preceded by the single "Godsend + Menschenfresser". "Godsend + Menschenfresser" peaked at #2 on the DAC Singles charts while the album reached the top position in the DAC, ranked #8 on the DAC Top Albums of 2006, and was voted album of the month in the German Orkus magazine.

Released in 2007, one year after the band's 20th anniversary, was the X20 boxset including 3 CDs (one remix CD, one "best of" CD and the Fuck You Bitch EP) and Suicide Commando's very first live DVD. In 2009, Suicide Commando signed a deal with the German Out of Line label. The first release on Out of Line was the 7" "severed head/until we die", not much later followed by a new EP called "die motherfucker die" which once again reached the top position in the German alternative chart. In 2010, Suicide Commando released the implements of hell album on Out of Line in three different editions and once again licensed in the US by Metropolis Records.

In 2011, Suicide Commando re-released their first three studio albums as The Suicide Sessions, a special limited six-CD box including remastered versions of his first three albums Critical Stage, Stored Images, and Construct-Destruct, and three discs with much bonus material and many previously unreleased songs. One year later, van Roy returned with "Attention Whore", as the lead single from the album When Evil Speaks, which was released in 2013 and reached the official German Media Control Charts at position 47. At the end of 2013, "Unterwelt" was released as the second single from When Evil Speaks.

In 2015, Suicide Commando returned with "The Pain That You Like" (featuring Jean Luc de Meyer from Front 242 as a guest vocalist) as the lead single from the album Forest of the Impaled (2017). The album reached the official German Media Control Charts at position 28.

== Discography ==
=== Studio albums ===
- Critical Stage (1994)
- Stored Images (1995)
- Construct-Destruct (1998) – #12 CMJ RPM Charts (U.S.)
- Mindstrip (2000) – #19 DAC Top 50 Albums of 2000 (Germany); #12 CMJ RPM Charts (U.S.)
- Axis of Evil (2003)
- Bind, Torture, Kill (2006) – #8 DAC Top 50 Albums of 2006 (Germany)
- Implements of Hell (2010)
- When Evil Speaks (2013)
- Forest of the Impaled (2017)
- Goddestruktor (2022)

=== Compilation albums ===
- Contamination (1996)
- Re-construction (1998)
- Chromdioxyde (1999)
- Anthology (2002)
- X20 (2007)
- The Suicide Sessions (2011)
- Electro Convulsion Therapy RE-RELEASE (2015)
- X-30 COMPENDIUM (2016)

=== Singles and EPs ===
- Never Get Out (1993)
- State of Emergency (1997)
- Comatose Delusion (2000) – #11 DAC Top 100 Singles of 2000, Germany
- Hellraiser (2000) – #22 DAC Top 100 Singles of 2000, Germany
- Love Breeds Suicide (2000) – #7 DAC Top 50 Singles of 2001, Germany
- Face of Death (2003) – #16 DAC Top 100 Singles of 2003, Germany
- Cause of Death: Suicide (2004)
- Cause of Death: Suicide / One Nation Under God (2004)
- Godsend / Menschenfresser (2005) – #2 DAC Singles
- Until We Die / Severed Head (2009)
- Die Motherfucker Die (2009)
- God Is in the Rain (2010)
- Death Cures All Pain (2010)
- Attention Whore (2012)
- Unterwelt (2013)
- The Pain That You Like (2015)
- Death will Find You (2018)
- Hellraiser (2019)
- Dein Herz, Meine Gier / Bunkerb!tch (2020)

=== Tapes ===
- Suicide Commando (demo) (1988)
- This Is Hate (1989)
- Industrial Rape I (1990)
- Crap (1990)
- Go to Hell (1990)
- Into the Grave (1991)
- Industrial Rape II (1991)
- Black Flowers (1992)
- Electro Convulsion Therapy (1993)
