= Florida Area, New Orleans =

Florida Area
- New Orleans neighborhood
- Interactive map of Florida Area
- Coordinates: 29°58′49″N 90°02′11″W
- Country: United States
- State: Louisiana
- City: New Orleans
- Planning District: District 7, Bywater District

Area
  - Total: 0.31 sq mi (0.80 km^{2})
  - Land: 0.31 sq mi (0.80 km^{2})
  - Water: 0.00 sq mi (0 km^{2})
- Elevation: 0 ft (0 m)

Population (2000)
  - Total: 3,171
  - Density: 10,000/sq mi (3,900/km^{2})
- Time zone: UTC-6 (CST)
  - Summer (DST): UTC-5 (CDT)
- Area code: 504

Florida Area is a neighborhood of the city of New Orleans. A subdistrict of the Bywater District Area, its boundaries as defined by the City Planning Commission are: Florida Boulevard, Gallier, Law, Congress and North Dorgenois Streets to the north; Mazant Street to the east; North Galvez Street to the south; and Montegut Street, Law Street, and Almonaster Avenue to the west.

== Geography ==
Florida Area is located at 29°58′49″N 90°02′11″W and has an elevation of 0 feet (0.0 m). According to the United States Census Bureau, the district has a total area of 0.31 square miles (0.8 km^{2}). 0.31 square miles (0.8 km^{2}) of which is land and 0.00 square miles (0.0 km^{2}) (0.0%) of which is water.

=== Adjacent neighborhoods ===
- Desire Area (north)
- Florida Projects (north)
- Bywater (east)
- St. Claude (south)
- St. Roch (west)

=== Boundaries ===
The City Planning Commission defines the boundaries of Florida Area as these streets: Florida Boulevard, Gallier Street, Congress Street, North Dorgenois Street, Mazant Street, North Galvez Street, Montegut Street, Law Street and Almonaster Avenue.

== Demographics ==
As of the census of 2000, there were 3,171 people, 1,189 households, and 823 families residing in the neighborhood. The population density was 10,229 /mi^{2} (3,964 /km^{2}).

As of the census of 2010, there were 1,302 people, 507 households, and 331 families residing in the neighborhood.

== See also ==
- Neighborhoods in New Orleans
