= Juan José Medina =

President of Paraguay

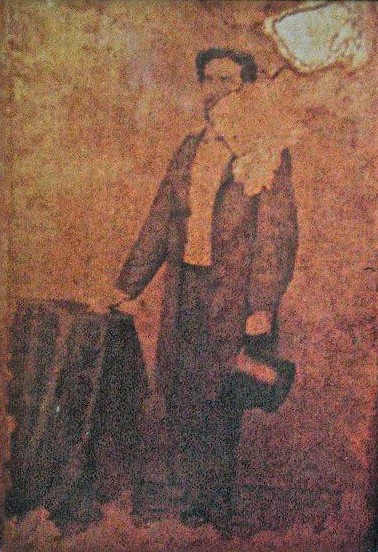
Juan José Medina

Juan José Medina was a leader of the Provisional Triumvirate of Paraguay from 22 January 1841 to 9 February 1841.

Following a coup d'état led by Ramon Duré and José Domingo Campos, the previous Provisional Junta of Manuel Antonio Ortiz was overthrown. To replace it, a triumvirate government was established, consisting of mayor Juan José Medina, José Domingo Campos, and the former second secretary of the previous regime, José Gabriel Benítez. The triumvirate was short lived and eventually ceded power to military officer Mariano Roque Alonso on February 9, 1841.

Political offices
Preceded by Manuel Antonio Ortiz	President of Provisional Junta; 1841	Succeeded by Mariano Roque Alonzo
