= Desire Area, New Orleans =

Desire Neighborhood, New Orleans, Louisiana
- CDP
- Location of Desire Neighborhood in Louisiana
- Coordinates: 29°59′30″N 90°02′19″W
- Country: United States
- State: Louisiana
- Parishes: Orleans

Area
  - Total: 10.9 sq mi (28 km^{2})
  - Land: 8.7 sq mi (23 km^{2})
  - Water: 2.2 sq mi (5.7 km^{2})
- Elevation: 3 ft (0.91 m)

Population (2000)
  - Total: 2,500
  - Density: 290/sq mi (110/km^{2})
- Time zone: UTC-6 (CST)
  - Summer (DST): UTC-5 (CDT)
- ZIP Code: 70030
- Area code: 504

Desire Area is a neighborhood of the city of New Orleans. A subdistrict of the Bywater District Area, its boundaries as defined by the City Planning Commission are: Gentilly Boulevard to the north; the Industrial Canal to the east; Florida Boulevard, Alvar Street, Higgins Boulevard, Piety Street, Pleasure Street, Oliver White Avenue, and Desire Street to the south; and People's Avenue to the west. It is part of the Upper 9th Ward.

== Geography ==
Desire Area is located at 29°59′39″N 90°02′04″W and has an elevation of 0 feet (0.0 m). According to the United States Census Bureau, the district has a total area of 1.83 square miles (4.7 km^{2}). 1.72 square miles (4.5 km^{2}) of which is land and 0.11 square miles (0.3 km^{2}) (6.01%) of which is water.

=== Adjacent neighborhoods ===
- Gentilly Woods (north)
- Viavant/Venetian Isles (east)
- Bywater (south)
- Florida Projects (south)
- New Desire Projects: Abundance Square (south)
- Florida Area (south)
- Gentilly Terrace (west)

=== Boundaries ===
The City Planning Commission defines the boundaries of Desire Area as these streets: Gentilly Boulevard, the Industrial Canal, Florida Boulevard, Alvar Street, Higgins Boulevard, Piety Street, Pleasure Street, Oliver White Avenue, Desire Street, and People's Avenue.

== Demographics ==
Note: The below demographic data is for the Desire Development and Area as these census tracts were combined for the 2010 Census.

As of the census of 2000, there were 4,451 people, 1,587 households, and 1,125 families residing in the neighborhood. The population density was 2,204 /mi^{2} (842 /km^{2}).

As of the census of 2010, there were 2,005 people, 678 households, and 502 families residing in the neighborhood.

The racial makeup of the area was 2.40% White, 95.70% African American, and 0.50% from two or more races. Hispanic or Latino of any race were 1.40% of the population.

== Education ==
New Orleans Public Schools and the Recovery School District form the school system.

George Washington Carver High School is the area public high school.

== See also ==
- Neighborhoods in New Orleans
- A Streetcar named Desire
