= Implementer =

Implementer may refer to:

- Implementer (video games), a software development role
- The Implementer role in the Belbin Team Role Inventories

== See also ==
- Implement (disambiguation)
