= Construct-Destruct =

Studio album by Suicide Commando
- Released: 1998
- Genre: Electro-industrial
- Length: 55:22
- Label: OffBeat
- Producer: Johan Van Roy

Suicide Commando chronology
Contamination (1996)	Construct-Destruct (1998)	Mindstrip (2000)

Construct-Destruct is the third album by the Belgian electro-industrial act Suicide Commando. The album peaked at #13 on the CMJ RPM Charts in the U.S.

== Track listing ==
1. "Acid Bath"
2. "Better Off Dead"
3. "Putrefaction Process"
4. "Desire"
5. "Somnambulist"
6. "Come To Me (v2.0)"
7. "The Mirror (re-MASTERed)"
8. "Pesticide"
9. "Massacre"
10. "Ignorance"
11. "Euthanasia"

=== Re-Construction ===
The Re-Construction reissue contains a second disc:

1. "Decoder (Instrumental Version)"
2. "Better Off Dead (Remixed By Dive)"
3. "Desire (SC DNA Swab)"
4. "Violator"
5. "Massacre (Exterminate)"
6. "Better Off Dead (Remixed By Pierrepoint)"
