= Contamination (album) =

Studio album by Suicide Commando
- Released: 1996
- Genre: Electro-industrial
- Length: 43:20
- Label: OffBeat
- Producer: Johan Van Roy

Suicide Commando chronology
Stored Images (1995)	Contamination (1996)	Construct-Destruct (1998)

Contamination is a 1996 album by Belgian electro-industrial act Suicide Commando.

== Track listing ==
1. "Fall Away" – 6:14
2. "See You In Hell, Part 1 & 2 (Extended Mix)" – 8:05
3. "Head Down" – 4:34
4. "Delusion" – 5:11
5. "The Face Of God" – 6:09
6. "Traumatize (Clubmix)" – 5:05
7. "See You In Hell (Remake By Monolith)" – 3:40
8. "Burn Baby Burn" – 3:59

In 1997, there was a re-release of Contamination with three more tracks listed called "Save Me (Long)", "Last Decision", and "Murder (Extended)".
