= Jed Horne =

American journalist (born 1948)

Jed Horne is a Pulitzer Prize-winning journalist who was for many years city editor of The Times-Picayune, the New Orleans daily newspaper.

He is the author of two books: Breach of Faith: Hurricane Katrina and the Near Death of a Great American City (Random House, 2006, updated 2008), which chronicled Hurricane Katrina and the city's gradual recovery, and Desire Street: A True Story of Death and Deliverance in New Orleans (Farrar Straus & Giroux, 2005), the story of a Louisiana death row case. Horne was named a senior consultant to President Obama's bipartisan National Commission on the BP Deepwater Horizon Oil Spill and Offshore Drilling following the 2010 blowout of BP's Deepwater Horizon rig in the Gulf of Mexico. In 2013 he made a documentary about the Fukushima tsunami and reactor disaster, that was broadcast on Japan's public television network, NHK. He has been interviewed by numerous radio and television personalities, including Terry Gross, Amy Goodman, Charlie Rose, and Tavis Smiley. With initial funding from George Soros, he helped founders Ariella Cohen and Karen Gadbois launch The Lens, an investigative website focused on New Orleans governance.

== Early life and education ==
The son of a school administrator and the great-nephew of Nobel laureate Dickinson Richards (medicine, 1956), Horne was born in Greenfield, Massachusetts in 1948. He is a graduate of Deerfield Academy and Harvard College, class of 1970.

== Career ==
He began his career in the early 1970s working with "alternative" weeklies, the Boston Phoenix and The Real Paper. In 1973 he moved to New York City and was employed by Time Inc. in magazine development. He was a founding editor of People Weekly and was involved in the revival of Life magazine as a monthly. After leaving Time Inc. he was a founding editor of Quest magazine. He moved to New Orleans in 1988 after a period of living and writing in the mid-Hudson Valley.

== Awards and honors ==
"Desire Street" was nominated for the 2006 Edgar for best non-fiction crime book of the year and was runner-up for the American Bar Association's Silver Gavel Award. "Breach of Faith" was declared "the best of the Katrina books," on National Public Radio's "All Things Considered." Horne was part of the Times-Picayune team awarded two Pulitzer Prizes for coverage of Hurricane Katrina. His articles have appeared in an array of publications, including The Village Voice, The Guardian, the New Republic and Vanity Fair.

== Personal ==
Horne and his wife, Jane Deering Wholey, a community organizer and founder of the youth organization Kids Rethink New Orleans Schools, are the parents of two sons, Jedidiah Huntington Horne and Elias Hudson Horne. Horne and Wholey currently divide their time between New Orleans and Pátzcuaro, a mountain town in the Mexican state of Michoacán.
