= Daniel Ortiz =

Daniel Ortiz may refer to:

- Danny Ortiz (1976–2004), Guatemalan football goalkeeper
- Danny Ortiz (baseball) (born 1990), Puerto Rican baseball player
- Dan Ortiz (politician), Alaskan state legislator
