= Stored Images =

Studio album by Suicide Commando
- Released: 1995
- Genre: Electro-industrial
- Length: 50:24
- Producer: Johan Van Roy

Suicide Commando chronology
Critical Stage (1994)	Stored Images (1995)	Contamination (1992)

Stored Images is the second album by Belgian electro-industrial act Suicide Commando.

== Track listing ==
No.	Track	Length
1.	"Murder"	5:48
2.	"The Exit"	5:04
3.	"Save Me (Remix)"	5:43
4.	"The Human Disgrace"	2:35
5.	"Intercourse (Reload II)"	4:00
6.	"Dying Inside"	5:23
7.	"Mortal Combat (Final Act I)"	4:00
8.	"The End of Your Life"	3:48
9.	"Actions of the Mind"	5:43
10.	"T.V.-Obsession"	4:46
11.	"See You in Hell!"	3:40
