= When Evil Speaks =

Studio album by Suicide Commando
- Released: May 6, 2013
- Genre: Electronic; EBM; Aggrotech; Electro-industrial; Dark electro
- Length: 60:07 (regular edition)
- Label: Out of Line
- Producer: Johan van Roy

Suicide Commando chronology
Implements of Hell (2010)	When Evil Speaks (2013)	Forest of the Impaled (2017)

When Evil Speaks is the eighth album by Suicide Commando. It was released on May 6, 2013.

The album was rated a 6 out of 10 by Release Magazine.

== Track listing ==
=== CD 1 "When Evil Speaks" ===
No.	Title	Length
1.	"Feeding My Inner Hate"	1:33
2.	"Cut_Bleed_Eviscerate"	6:05
3.	"My Blasphemy"	4:16
4.	"When Evil Speaks"	4:53
5.	"Monster"	5:13
6.	"Attention Whore"	4:53
7.	"Repent or Perish"	6:40
8.	"In Guns We Trust"	6:01
9.	"Time (Rewind)"	5:01
10.	"Evacuate (Where's the Exit Remix)"	4:47
11.	"Song of No Tomorrow"	5:53

=== CD 2 "When Hate Prevails" ===
No.	Title	Length
1.	"My Blasphemy (Die Sektor Remix)"	6:13
2.	"Attention Whore (Incestuos Remix By Alien Vampires)"	4:15
3.	"When Evil Speaks (Shiv-R Remix)"	4:50
4.	"My Blasphemy (Absolute Body Control Remix)"	5:34
5.	"Repent or Perish (VProjekt Remix)"	6:44
6.	"When Evil Speaks (SIN DNA Remix)"	4:42
7.	"My Blasphemy (Dust Mix By ES23)"	4:14
8.	"Evacuate (Apocalyptica Remix By Betamorphose)"	3:58
9.	"Attention Whore (Hydra Division V Remix)"	3:55
10.	"Monster (Unter Null Remix)"	4:19
11.	"My Blasphemy (Cygnosic Remix)"	4:31
12.	"God Is in the Rain (First Black Pope Remix)"	4:18
13.	"Attention Whore (Nano Infect Remix)"	5:13
14.	"Song of No Tomorrow (Controlled Collapse Remix)"	4:54

=== CD 3 "Rewind - Live Vintage Set" ===
No.	Title	Length
1.	"Murder"	6:06
2.	"TV-Obsession"	4:33
3.	"Traumatize"	4:58
4.	"Sheer Horror"	5:15
5.	"The Ultimate Machine"	4:19
6.	"Mortal Combat"	4:01
7.	"Where Do We Go from Here (Featuring – Dirk Ivens)"	4:20
8.	"Never Get Out"	5:06
9.	"Save Me"	5:42
10.	"Time"	4:13
11.	"Fate"	4:38
12.	"See You in Hell"	3:47

Recorded at Tivoli De Helling, Utrecht (Holland) in July 2012.
