= Bywater, New Orleans =

Bywater
- Neighborhood
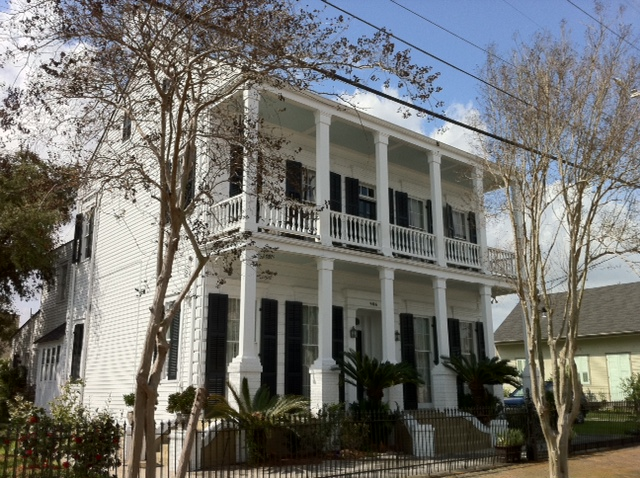
- The Mazant on Mazant Street in Bywater
- Interactive map of Bywater
- Coordinates: 29°57′46″N 90°02′24″W
- Country: United States
- State: Louisiana
- City: New Orleans
- Planning District: District 7, Bywater District

Area
  - Total: 1.33 sq mi (3.4 km^{2})
  - Land: 0.94 sq mi (2.4 km^{2})
  - Water: 0.39 sq mi (1.0 km^{2})
- Elevation: 3 ft (0.91 m)

Population (2010)
  - Total: 2,181
  - Density: 2,300/sq mi (900/km^{2})
- Time zone: UTC-6 (CST)
  - Summer (DST): UTC-5 (CDT)
- Area code: 504

- Bywater Historic District
- U.S. National Register of Historic Places
- Location within Louisiana Location within the United States
- Location: Roughly bounded by the N. Claiborne Ave. and Urquhart St., Kentucky St., Mississippi River, and Montegut and Press Sts., New Orleans, Louisiana
- Area: 290 acres (120 ha)
- Architectural style: Bungalow/craftsman, Italianate, Shotgun House
- NRHP reference No.: 86000113
- Added to NRHP: January 23, 1986

Bywater is a neighborhood of the city of New Orleans. A subdistrict of the Bywater District Area, its boundaries as defined by the City Planning Commission are: Florida Avenue to the north, the Industrial Canal to the east, the Mississippi River to the south, and the railroad tracks along Homer Plessy Way (formerly Press Street) to the west. Bywater is part of the Ninth Ward of New Orleans. It includes part or all of Bywater Historic District, which is listed on the National Register of Historic Places.

During New Orleans Mardi Gras, the Society of Saint Anne marching krewe starts their procession on Mardi Gras morning in Bywater and gathers marchers as it travels through the French Quarter, ending at Canal Street. This walking parade of local residents, artists, and performers is preceded by the Bywater Bone Boys Social Aid and Pleasure Club (founded 2005), an early-rising skeleton krewe made up of writers, tattoo artists, painters, set designers, musicians, and numerous other pre–7 a.m. revelers.

After Hurricane Katrina, many survivors flocked to the area as it was less affected by the storm, due to the slightly higher elevation closer to the Mississippi river. Bywater became part of what was known as the "Sliver by the River," meaning neighborhoods that saw no flooding, including Faubourg Marigny, the French Quarter and Irish Channel neighborhoods, and parts of the lower Garden District including St. Charles Avenue.

Bywater Neighborhood Association was founded in 1975.

== Geography ==
Bywater is located at 29°57′46″N 90°02′24″W and has an elevation of 3 feet (0.9 m). According to the United States Census Bureau, the district has a total area of 1.33 square miles (3.4 km^{2}), 0.94 square miles (2.4 km^{2}) of which is land and 0.39 square miles (1.0 km^{2}) (29.32%) of which is water.

=== Adjacent neighborhoods ===
- Desire Area (north)
- Lower Ninth Ward (east)
- Holy Cross (east)
- Mississippi River (south)
- Marigny (west)
- St. Claude (west)
- Florida Area (west)

=== Boundaries ===
The traditional boundaries of Bywater are: the Mississippi River to St. Claude Avenue, and the railroad tracks along Homer Plessy Way (formerly Press Street) to the Industrial Canal. Press Street's name came from a cotton press (known elsewhere as a cotton compress) which operated here during the 19th century. The Bywater/Marigny stretch of Press Street was changed to Homer Plessy Way in 2018 to memorialize Homer Plessy, the plaintiff in Plessy v. Ferguson, the 1896 decision of the U.S. Supreme Court that upheld the constitutionality of racial segregation laws for public facilities.

== Demographics ==
As of the census of 2000, there were 5,096 people, 2,263 households, and 1,030 families residing in the neighborhood. The population density was 5,421 inhabitants per square mile (2,093/km^{2}).

As of the census of 2010, there were 3,337 people, 1,763 households, and 573 families residing in the neighborhood. The population density was 3,550 inhabitants per square mile (1,370/km^{2}).

== History ==
The area now known as Bywater was mostly plantation land in the colonial era, with significant residential development beginning the first decade of the 19th century as part of what was known as "Faubourg Washington," part of the predominantly Francophone "downtown" section of New Orleans. Many people from France, Spain, and the French Caribbean settled here. During the century, it grew with both white Creoles of French and Spanish descent, as well as mixed-race Creoles of French, Spanish, African, and Native American descent. They were also joined by immigrants from Germany, Italy, and Ireland.

Lombard Plantation formerly existed on what is now an urbanized section of Bywater. The only remaining structure is the Lombard House.

In 1803, architect Benjamin Henry Latrobe was hired by Thomas Jefferson as superintendent of construction of the United States Capital. He later relocated to New Orleans. He worked on numerous architectural projects in the city, most notably he designed the central tower of St. Louis Cathedral. He died in Bywater in 1820.

Bywater is home to the site at which Homer Plessy was removed from an East Louisiana Railroad car for violating the separate car act, an event that resulted in the Plessy v. Ferguson case and the legal doctrine of "separate but equal." Today, a historical marker stands at the intersection of Press Street and Royal Street to commemorate the event.

There was little distinction between this area and what became known as the Lower 9th Ward until the Industrial Canal was dredged in the early 20th century, dividing the two.

A generation knew the area as the "Upper 9th Ward," but as other parts of the 9th Ward above the Canal farther from the River became developed, a more specific name was needed. Inspired by the local telephone exchange designation of Bywater, which fit the neighborhood's proximity to the River and the Canal, the neighborhood was known as "Bywater" by the 1940s.

Real estate development and speculation surrounding the 1984 Louisiana World Exposition prompted many long-term French Quarter residents to move down river, at first into Marigny. By the late 1990s the bohemian, artistic type of communities such as were found in the French Quarter mid-20th century had spread to Bywater, and many long-neglected 19th-century houses began to be refurbished.

Bywater and neighboring Faubourg Marigny are two of the most colorful neighborhoods in the city. The architectural styles borrow heavily from the colonial French and Spanish and have elements of Caribbean vernacular architecture. This blending over the last three centuries has resulted in an architectural style unique to the city of New Orleans.

As the section of Bywater on the River side of St. Claude Avenue was one of the few portions of the 9th Ward to escape major flooding in the aftermath of Hurricane Katrina, it has made steady progress toward recovery, more so than many other parts of the city.

== Notable people ==
- Sallie Ann Glassman artist, Voodoo priestess
- Charmaine Neville, singer
- Steve Rapport, photographer
- S. Frederick Starr, academic and musician, former president of Oberlin College
- Helen Gillet, musician
- Washboard Chaz, musician, singer-songwriter
- Papa Mali, record producer, guitarist, singer, and songwriter
- John Cameron Mitchell, film director

== See also ==
- Neighborhoods in New Orleans
