= Jacques-Désiré =

Jacques-Désiré is a given name, and may refer to:

- Jacques-Désiré Laval (1803-1864), French Roman Catholic priest
- Jacques-Désiré Périatambée (born 1975), Mauritian footballer
