= Pimp Daddy =

- Terriers episode
- Episode no.: Season 1 Episode 9
- Directed by: Adam Arkin
- Written by: Shawn Ryan; Kelly Wheeler
- Cinematography by: Curtis Wehr
- Editing by: David Kaldor
- Production code: 1WAD08
- Original air date: November 3, 2010
- Running time: 43 minutes

Guest appearances
- Loren Dean as Jason Adler; Cameron Monaghan as Cody Brice; Gregory Sims as Ryan; D.J. "Shangela" Pierce as Michela; Patrick David Cullen as Vince Patterson

Episode chronology
← Previous "Agua Caliente"	Next → "Asunder"

"Pimp Daddy" is the ninth episode of the American crime comedy-drama television series Terriers. The episode was written by executive producer Shawn Ryan and Kelly Wheeler, and directed by Adam Arkin. It was first broadcast on FX in the United States on November 3, 2010.

The series is set in Ocean Beach, San Diego and focuses on ex-cop and recovering alcoholic Hank Dolworth (Donal Logue) and his best friend, former criminal Britt Pollack (Michael Raymond-James), who both decide to open an unlicensed private investigation business. In the episode, Britt goes on his own to help a transgender prostitute in locating her friend's killer. Meanwhile, Hank decides to investigate Jason's background.

According to Nielsen Media Research, the episode was seen by an estimated 0.667 million household viewers and gained a 0.3/1 ratings share among adults aged 18–49. The episode received extremely positive reviews from critics, who praised the writing, performances, character development and pacing.

== Plot ==
Britt (Michael Raymond-James) visits Hank (Donal Logue), who is recovering from his gunshot wound. He leaves Hank with his physiotherapist, who asks the pair to meet with his nephew Cody (Cameron Monaghan), who needs help recovering $400 stolen from him by a prostitute.

Hank is called by Maggie (Jamie Denbo), who investigated Jason (Loren Dean) at his behest. She informs him that Jason's real name was Jason Voloway. Jason's parents were daycare employees accused of child molestation, and although some victims testified Jason participated, he was acquitted in a criminal trial. Against Maggie's advice, Hank leans toward telling Gretchen (Kimberly Quinn), as her wedding is approaching — which he still has not responded if he will attend. Britt finds the prostitute, Mikaela (D.J. "Shangela" Pierce), a transgender street walker who skipped out on the novice Cody. Britt asks for Cody's money, so she uses him to intimidate a fellow client for money, including the $400. He gives the money back to Cody, telling him to stay away from prostitutes.

Hank contacts a reporter who previously covered the Voloway family trials for his opinion of the case. Later, he interviews a victim of Jason’s parents, who confirms the abuse he endured and believes that while Jason didn’t participate, he knew about the abuse taking place. Britt finds a pregnancy test on the trash, believing it to be why Katie (Laura Allen) has been distant toward him lately. Mikaela approaches Britt again, asking for his help in finding the person responsible for her friend Crystal's death. They access police records with Reynolds’s help, discovering that Crystal’s original name was Trevor and that her likely killer already committed suicide.

Britt tells Hank about the pregnancy test, causing Hank to meet with Katie. She confirms that she is pregnant, but she does not know whether Britt or her professor is the father. Hank also confronts Jason with his knowledge of the daycare incidents, warning him to either tell Gretchen or Hank will do it himself. Jason only tells Hank that he still can't get over Gretchen and tells him to do whatever he wants. Britt and Mikaela visit Crystal’s family to inform them of her fate, with Mikaela expressing that Crystal was a good person. Hank visits Gretchen and gives her his evidence on Jason. Gretchen is furious at him for spying on Jason, who had told her about it on their second date. Angered, she disinvites Hank from her wedding and he leaves. That night, Britt asks Katie to marry him. Despite feeling uncertain about her pregnancy, she accepts.

== Reception ==
=== Viewers ===
The episode was watched by 0.667 million viewers, earning a 0.3/1 in the 18-49 rating demographics on the Nielson ratings scale. This means that 0.3 percent of all households with televisions watched the episode, while 1 percent of all households watching television at that time watched it. This was a 43% increase in viewership from the previous episode, which was watched by 0.465 million viewers with a 0.2/1 in the 18-49 rating demographics.

=== Critical reviews ===
"Pimp Daddy" received extremely positive reviews from critics. Noel Murray of The A.V. Club gave the episode a "B+" grade and wrote, "If you'd described the rudiments of the plot to tonight's Terriers a couple of weeks ago, I don't know that I would've been that amped about it. First off, 'Pimp Daddy' has Hank and Britt working two separate cases, with Britt trying to find out what happened to a transsexual runaway while Hank looks into the shady past of Gretchen’s fiancé Jason. The subject matter of each is sensationalistic and inevitably leads to the kind of heated one-to-one confrontations that are more the province of ordinary TV dramas, not Terriers. Add in a subplot that has Katie learning she's pregnant and you've got a recipe for rank melodrama, not the slyest crime show on the dial."

Alan Sepinwall of HitFix wrote, "Like last week's episode, much of 'Pimp Daddy' kept Britt and Hank apart, with Britt doing various good deeds related to Michaela the transgendered hooker, while Hank looked into the old allegations about Gretchen’s fiance. But where I found 'Agua Caliente' to the be the series' first disappointing episode, 'Pimp Daddy' was a really strong one." James Poniewozik of TIME wrote, "Last week's Terriers post convinced me there's enough interest in the show that I should return to it on the blog. And this was a good week to do it, because 'Pimp Daddy' was a strong explanation of two questions that Terriers explores. The first is a question common to any private-eye story: what can you find out? The second is a question sometimes explored by truly good private-eye stories: what do you really want to know?"

Matt Richenthal of TV Fanatic gave the episode a 3.8 star rating out of 5 and wrote, "Overall, not my favorite episode of Terriers, largely because we didn't get a lot of Hank and Britt together. But it still had its moments. My favorite: when the kid asked Britt if they were still in their trust bubble and he meant to flash the scout's honor sign. Instead, Britt pretty much just held up his hand. Terriers does small moments of interaction such as this better than any show on TV." Cory Barker of TV Overmind wrote, "Based on my exploration of last week's reviews it seems I was higher on 'Agua Caliente' than most, but that's okay. And even though I really, really enjoyed that episode, I found that 'Pimp Daddy' holds together a little bit better and is thus a 'better' episode."
