= Axis of Evil (album) =

Studio album by Suicide Commando
- Released: 2003
- Genre: EBM
- Producer: Johan Van Roy

Suicide Commando chronology
Anthology (2002)	Axis of Evil (2003)	Bind Torture Kill (2006)

Axis of Evil is the fifth album by the Belgian aggrotech act Suicide Commando.

== Track listing ==
1. "Cause of Death: Suicide"
2. "Consume Your Vengeance"
3. "Face of Death"
4. "The Reformation"
5. "One Nation Under God"
6. "Mordfabrik"
7. "Evildoer"
8. "Sterbehilfe"
9. "Plastik Christ"
10. "Neuro Suspension"

== Bibliography ==
- Axis of Evil at AllMusic. Retrieved 18:37, 15 August 2016 (UTC).
