= Desirable =

Desirable may refer to:

- something that is considered a favorable outcome, see e.g. best response
- Desirable (film)
- Desirable (horse), a racehorse

== See also ==
- Desire (disambiguation)
