= The Desideratum; or, Electricity Made Plain and Useful =

The Desideratum; or, Electricity Made Plain and Useful - By a Lover of Mankind, and of Common Sense is a 1760 book by John Wesley advocating the use of electric shock therapy. Wesley collected the accounts of other researchers with "electrifying machines", and to them added observations from his own experiments in public clinics.

== Legacy ==
The 72-page book has led Wesley to be mentioned alongside his contemporaries Richard Lovett and Jean Paul Marat as a pioneer advocate of the medical uses of electroconvulsive therapy, despite the fact that Wesley's tests and results are not considered scientific by modern standards.
