= Mindstrip =

Studio album by Suicide Commando
- Released: 2000
- Genre: EBM

Suicide Commando chronology
Chromdioxyde (1999)	Mindstrip (2000)	Anthology (2002)

Professional ratings
Review scores
Source	Rating
AllMusic	3/5 stars
Metal Hammer	6/10

Mindstrip is the fourth album by the Belgian electro-industrial act Suicide Commando. The album was ranked #19 on the German Alternative Chart's (DAC) Top 50 albums of 2000 and peaked at #12 on the CMJ RPM Charts in the U.S.

== Track listing ==
No.	Track	Length
1.	"Jesus Wept"	5:59
2.	"Hell Raiser (Psychopath 01-Version)	5:01
3.	"Body Count Proceed"	5:37
4.	"Raise Your God"	4:07
5.	"Mindstripper	4:31
6.	"Run"	3:41
7.	"Comatose Delusion (Overdose Shot Two)"	5:12
8.	"Blood In Face"	4:47
9.	"Love Breeds Suicide"	5:16
10.	"Slaves"	5:40
