= Désiré (video game) =

2016 video game

- Developer: Sylvain Seccia
- Publisher: Sylvain Seccia (2016 - 2018) Petite Fleur Productions (2018 - Present)
- Designer: Sylvain Seccia
- Artists: Sébastien Vallart; Antoine Gouy; Maxime Morvan
- Composer: Loïk Brédolèse
- Platforms: Macintosh; Windows; Steam; Android iOS
- Release: May 10, 2016
- Genre: Adventure
- Mode: Single-player

Désiré is a French indie point-and-click adventure video game by Sylvain Seccia published in 2016. The game is about the titular character, Désiré, an achromatic boy who only sees black and white, and the player guides him in four various parts of his life. The game contains themes such as sexuality, bullying, pedophilia, zoophilia, suicide, depression, morality, feminism, BDSM and criticism of aspects of modern society such as capitalism and materialism.

== Plot ==
The game begins with a cutscene of a young Désiré who is asked by his kindergarten teacher why he has not drawn the sun like the other children; he replies that he has never seen the sun, since it "is always night in his head".

The game continues on a beach in 1992, where a young Désiré wants to cast a "love spell" on a classmate he has a crush on. The player directs Désiré in all his actions, such as picking up objects, talking to various characters, and exploring the world. After successfully burying a box with an egg, which has the name of Désiré's crush on it, the game continues to the next chapter.

Désiré, who lives in the suburbs of Lyon with his parents and brother Bruno, is advised by an old man (who is apparently imaginary, as other characters imply) to stand up against a boy named David who bullies him at school. Désiré plots to catch David in the act of masturbating and distribute pictures of it around the school. After successfully doing this, David and Désiré are both expelled from school.

The next chapter starts in 2003. Désiré, now an adult man living in Paris, is informed that his company is firing him because they are outsourcing part of its operations. Désiré is in love with Elma, who does not seem to return the feeling, and he promises her a gig at a restaurant in an attempt to woo her. After successfully doing this, Elma doesn't show up at the day of the gig, and a heartbroken Désiré comes to believe that it is better not to love.

In 2011, Désiré has discarded love and instead visits brothels to satisfy his desires. The chapter begins with a dream or hallucination of Désiré standing before a brothel which appears as a giant woman's genital area. Désiré also visits Élodie, one of his friends, who is in love with her dog Rocco. He decides to visit another friend, Damien, and recruits the help of Andy, another friend, to find Damien after discovering threatening letters from Damien's neighbour. Eventually, it is discovered that Damien committed suicide; it is also revealed Damien was a pedophile but never acted on it. The chapter ends with Désiré talking to a hallucination of an obese man who tries to convince him to stop changing society, however corrupt it might be, and to accept everything as it is.

The final chapter starts in 2020. Désiré has been living in a village in Congo for two years, but wants to return to France and find the manuscript that an old sailor gave him when he was a child. His parents gave the manuscript to a charity, and Désiré returns to Lyon in search of it. A clue in a secondhand shop gives him a lead, but the shop salesman, who is revealed to be David, confronts Désiré, who is forced to beat him up. Désiré traces the manuscript to a small village. He finds a young girl, Léa, alone on the streets and reveals her grandfather is Martin Lacour, an antique collector who currently owns the manuscript. Désiré accompanies Léa back home, and Lacour reluctantly allows Désiré to read the manuscript. After realizing it is the real one, he steals it from Lacour's safe and reads it in the local church. Désiré is now able to see colors, and is ecstatic, but he can't bring himself to steal it and decides to return it to Léa, who thanks him. The chapter ends with Désiré hallucinating an apparition of Jesus, who claims Désiré is afraid of change and gave the manuscript away for that reason.

The game ends with Désiré accepting the world as it ends, yet feeling condemned to live while pursuing his path.

== Reception ==
The game received a wide spread of review scores, varying from very negative to very positive.

The French gaming website Joypad gave it a positive review. The game was notable enough to receive coverage on a TV report of La Une.

The game won Best Mobile Game and Best Game Audio at the Tel Aviv Indie Game Awards 2016, and Best Game Narrative in the Asia Indie Game Awards 2016. It also won Best Game Audio in the Évry Games City Awards 2016.

Manos Karkalemis, writing for Rage Quit, stated that Désiré was "one of the most "difficult" and indigestible adventure games" they had come in contact with. They went on to say "due to its appearance I was prepared for a totally different experience, however, it proved that it hid very heavy contents inside, trying to cope with numerous extremely important issues of human sexuality in just a few hours' time. That’s its major problem that eventually marks its biggest weakness." Karkalemis praised the achievements of the game, noting how it was "very quality work" for having been made by one man, also going on to praise some of the game's soundtrack and its handling of bullying. They go on to criticise the game in other areas, however, saying that it tried to tackle too many themes in such a short run time that its storytelling felt rushed in certain areas. They also brought up the puzzle design, some repetitive music tracks, the lack of voiceovers as other points of contention. Karkalemis ultimately gave the game a 72/100.

In a more negative review, Shuva Raha of Adventure Gamers stated "If you have a strong masochistic urge to inflict a few hours of excruciating, pretentious sociopolitical ramblings interspersed with bouts of petty cruelty and vulgarity upon yourself, Désiré is the game for you." Raha criticised the writing of the main character, calling him "obnoxious" as well as how the game represented some of its themes, notably disabilities. Raha also criticised the writing as a whole, its gameplay, citing frequent backtracking, slow movement speeds, poorly clued quests and puzzles, and the lack of voice acting or sound effects. Raha went on however to praise the game for its art design.

== Removal from Steam ==
On February 17th, 2017, it was announced on the game's news feed by Valve Corporation, the owners of Steam, that they had removed Désiré from sale and severed business relations with the game's developer Sylvain Seccia. Valve cited in their statement that Seccia had used multiple Steam accounts to create fake positive reviews for the game, which violated Steam's review policy. On March 31st, 2017, the developer confirmed that they had taken part in this activity while responding to discussion forum posts on the game's community hub.

On May 10th, 2018, the game was republished to Steam through the publisher Petite Fleur Productions. The previous store page remains deactivated as of 2024. The original version received updates up until September 2018. After this, only the 2018 version received updates, with the final update being released in July 2020.
