= Implements of Hell =

Implements Of Hell

Studio album by Suicide Commando
- Released: January 22, 2010
- Recorded: 2008–2009
- Genre: EBM; Industrial
- Length: CD 1: 53:05; CD 2: 56:29
- Label: Metropolis Records

Suicide Commando chronology
Bind, Torture, Kill (2006)	Implements Of Hell (2010)	When Evil Speaks (2013)

Implements of Hell is the seventh studio album by the Belgian aggrotech act Suicide Commando. It was released in 2010. The title is a reference to the name given by serial killer Albert Fish to the tools used to torture and kill his victims.

The track "Severed Head" contains samples from an episode of Born to Kill which is about the serial killer Edmund Kemper.

== Track listing ==
=== CD 1 "Implements of Hell" ===
1. "Intro"
2. "The Pleasures Of Sin"
3. "The Dying Breed"
4. "Die Motherfucker Die"
5. "Death Cures All Pain"
6. "God Is In The Rain"
7. "Hate Me (Retaliate V1.0)"
8. "Come Down With Me"
9. "Severed Head"
10. "The Perils Of Indifference"
11. "Until We Die (Album Edit)"

=== CD 2 "Implements of Hell" bonus ===
1. "Severed Head (Heads Of State Mix by Komor Kommando)"
2. "Die Motherfucker Die (Modulate Remix)"
3. "Cause Of Death: Suicide (Final Count 2009)"
4. "The Perils Of Indifference (remixed by JH from Centhron)"
5. "Hate Me (Leaether Strip Remix)"
6. "Die Motherfucker Die (Nurzery Rhymes vs Betamorphose Remix)"
7. "The Perils Of Indifference (Xotox Remix)"
8. "Hate Me (Original version)"
9. "Severed Head (Beheaded mix by Schattenschlag)"
10. "Die Motherfucker Die (Apology Not Accepted Remix by Fïx8Sëd8)"
11. "Until We Die (Winter Version)"

=== CD 3 "God Is in the Rain" ===
1. "God Is in the Rain [book of lies V1.0)"
2. "God Is in the Rain [book of lies V2.0 - club mix]"
3. "Infliction of Pain"
4. "God Is in the Rain [:wumpscut: remix]"
5. "God Is in the Rain [the synthetic dream foundation remix]"
6. "White Lines, White Lies [previously unreleased demo version 1999]"
