= Héctor Ortiz =

Hector Ortiz may refer to:

== Sport ==
- Héctor Ortiz (baseball) (1969–2024), Puerto Rican baseball player
- Héctor Ortiz (footballer) (1928–1995), Mexican footballer
- Héctor Ortiz (referee) (born 1933), Paraguayan football referee
- Héctor Ortiz (runner), Puerto Rican athlete, see 1971 Central American and Caribbean Championships in Athletics
- Héctor Ortiz (tennis) (1961–2010), Mexican tennis player

== Other uses ==
- Héctor Ortiz, birth name of music producer Hex Hector
- Héctor Ortiz Ortiz (born 1950), Mexican politician, governor of Tlaxcala
