= Enrique Ortiz =

Enrique Ortiz may refer to:

- Enrique Ortiz (Spanish footballer) (born 1977), Spanish footballer

See also:

- Enrique Ortez (1931–2022), Honduran politician
- Quique Ortiz (born 1979), Argentine footballer
