= St. Claude, New Orleans =

St. Claude
- New Orleans neighborhood
- Interactive map of St. Claude
- Coordinates: 29°58′18″N 90°02′20″W
- Country: United States
- State: Louisiana
- City: New Orleans
- Planning District: District 7, Bywater District

Area
  - Total: 1.02 sq mi (2.6 km^{2})
  - Land: 1.02 sq mi (2.6 km^{2})
  - Water: 0.00 sq mi (0 km^{2})
- Elevation: 0 ft (0 m)

Population (2010)
  - Total: 3,454
  - Density: 3,390/sq mi (1,310/km^{2})
- Time zone: UTC-6 (CST)
  - Summer (DST): UTC-5 (CDT)
- Area code: 504

St. Claude is a neighborhood of the city of New Orleans. A subdistrict of the Bywater District Area, its boundaries as defined by the City Planning Commission are: Law, Montegut and North Galvez Streets to the north, Lesseps Street to the east, Burgundy Street, Clouet Street and St. Claude Avenue to the south and Franklin Avenue to the west.

St. Claude is the location of the former Francis T. Nicholls High School, since renamed Frederick Douglass High School.

== Geography ==
St. Claude is located at 29°58′18″N 90°02′20″W and has an elevation of 0 feet (0.0 m). According to the United States Census Bureau, the district has a total area of 1.02 square miles (2.6 km^{2}). 1.02 square miles (2.6 km^{2}) of which is land and 0.00 square miles (0.0 km^{2}) (0.0%) of which is water.

=== Adjacent neighborhoods ===
- Florida Area (north)
- Bywater (east & south)
- St. Roch (west)

=== Boundaries ===
The City Planning Commission defines the boundaries of St. Claude as these streets: Law Street, Montegut Street, North Galvez Street, Lesseps Street, Burgundy Street, Clouet Street, St. Claude Avenue and Franklin Avenue.

== Demographics ==
As of the census of 2000, there were 11,721 people, 4,114 households, and 2,820 families residing in the neighborhood. The population density was 11,491 /mi^{2} (4,508 /km^{2}).

As of the census of 2010, there were 6,820 people, 2,713 households, and 1,546 families residing in the neighborhood.

== See also ==
- New Orleans neighborhoods
