= Désiré =

Désiré is a French male given name, which means "desired, wished". The female form is Désirée. Désiré may refer to:

- Amable Courtecuisse (1823–1873), French baritone known simply as Désiré
- Désiré Bastin (1900–1972), Belgian football player
- Dési Bouterse (born 1945), Surinamese politician
- Désiré Charnay (1828–1915), French archaeologist
- Désiré Collen (born 1943), Belgian physician
- Désiré Dalloz (1795–1869), French jurist
- Désiré Defauw (1885–1960), Belgian conductor
- Désiré Dondeyne (1921–2015), French conductor
- Désiré Doué (born 2005), French footballer
- Désiré Ferry (1886–1940), French politician
- Désiré Girouard (1836–1911), Canadian lawyer
- Désiré de Haerne (1804–1890), Signatory of the Belgian Constitution
- Désiré Keteleer (1920–1970), Belgian cyclist
- Désiré Koranyi (1914–1981), Hungarian-French football player
- Désiré Mbonabucya (born 1977), Rwandan football player
- Désiré Mérchez (1882–1968), French swimmer
- Desire Moyo (1979–2025), Zimbabwean politician
- Désiré Mukanirwa Kadhoro (1968–2020), Congolese Anglican bishop
- Désiré Munyaneza (born 1966), Rwandan war criminal
- Désiré Nisard (1806–1888), French author
- Désiré Olivier Bourbeau (1834–1900), Canadian politician
- Désiré Pauwels (1864–1894), Belgian anarchist
- Désiré Rakotoarijaona (born 1934), Prime Minister of Madagascar
- Désiré van Monckhoven (1834–1882), Belgian chemist
- Désiré Vervoort (1810–1886), Belgian lawyer

== See also ==
- Constant-Désiré
- Désiré-Émile
- Désiré-Joseph
- Désiré-Lucas
- Désiré-Magloire
- François-Désiré
- Jacques-Désiré
- Jean-Désiré
- Joseph-Désiré
- Laurent-Désiré
- Louis-Désiré
- Saint-Désiré
