= Desire Projects =

Housing project in New Orleans, Louisiana, US

Desire Street Housing Development
- Interactive map of Desire Street Housing Development

General information
- Location: 2900 Desire Street, New Orleans, LA 70117; United States
- Status: Demolished

Construction
- Constructed: 1952–1954

Listing
- Demolished: 1995–1999

Other information
- Governing body: Housing Authority of New Orleans
- Famous residents: Marshall Faulk

Desire Projects was a housing project located in the Ninth Ward of New Orleans, Louisiana. These projects were the largest in the nation and consisted of about 262 two-story brick buildings, containing about 1,860 units across 98.5 acres of land. The buildings in the Desire Projects were poorly constructed in the 1950s and received little to no maintenance by the government. The projects were meant to serve the large number of underprivileged African-American residents in the New Orleans area. Located in a cypress swamp and dumping ground, Desire was known as the poorest housing development in New Orleans—it was bordered by railroad tracks, the Mississippi River, the Industrial Canal and a corridor of industrial plants.

Historically Desire was the city's most dangerous housing project and was documented as being one of the deadliest communities in the country. Starting in the late 1960s, most of the crime was from the residents having few legal economic opportunities and thus fighting for the income made available by the heroin trade. When crack cocaine arrived in the mid-1980s, the crime rate in Desire increased further. After residents began moving out, the resulting vacant apartments provided convenient places for drug dealers to stash drugs; killings related to drug deals were commonplace. Former residents often claimed that life in the Desire Projects was worth less than a pair of basketball shoes. The nearby Florida Projects had similarly high crime rates.

In 1995, murders drastically decreased in the Desire project and the Florida development. That same year in February the U.S. Department of Housing and Urban Development approved a HOPE VI grant to HANO to improve the living environment through rehabilitation of the housing. Mass demolition began in 1997 and the project was completely razed by 1999.

== Geography ==
Desire Projects is located at 29°59′21″N 90°01′55″W with its elevation at sea level. According to the United States Census Bureau, the district has a total area of 0.22 square miles (0.6 km^{2}), all of which is land, with none covered by water.

=== Adjacent neighborhoods ===
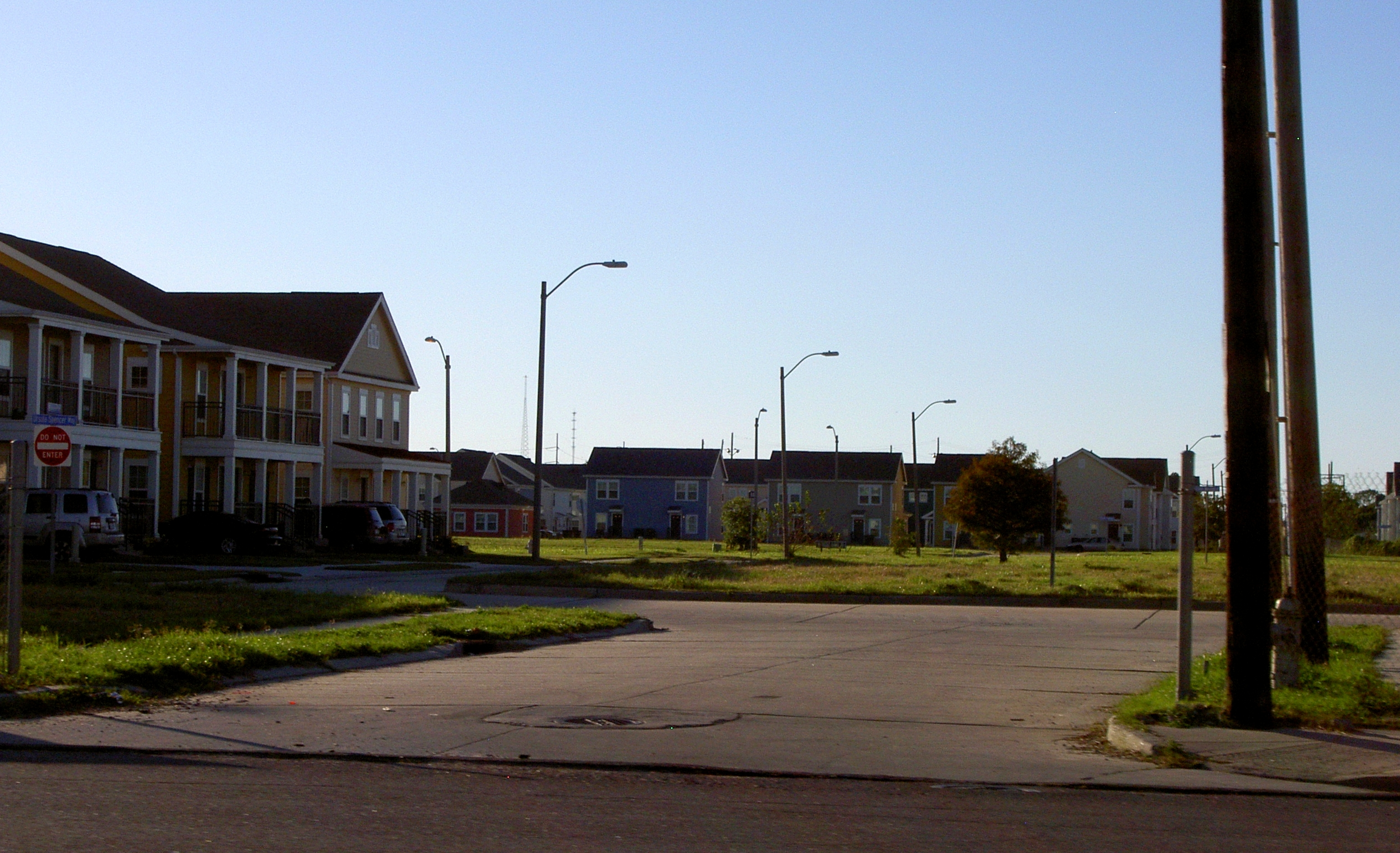
New housing construction on the former site of the Desire Projects a decade after they were demolished.

- Desire Area (north, east and west)
- Florida Projects (south)

=== Boundaries ===
The City Planning Commission defines the boundaries of Desire Projects as these streets: Higgins Boulevard, Alvar Street, Florida Boulevard, Desire Street, Oliver White Avenue, Pleasure Street and Piety Street.

== Demographics ==
Note: The below demographic data is for the Desire Development and Area as these census tracts were combined for the 2010 Census. As of the census of 2000, there were 4,451 people, 1,587 households, and 1,125 families residing in the neighborhood. The population density was 2,204/mi^{2} (842/km^{2}). As of the census of 2010, there were 2,005 people, 678 households, and 502 families residing in the neighborhood.

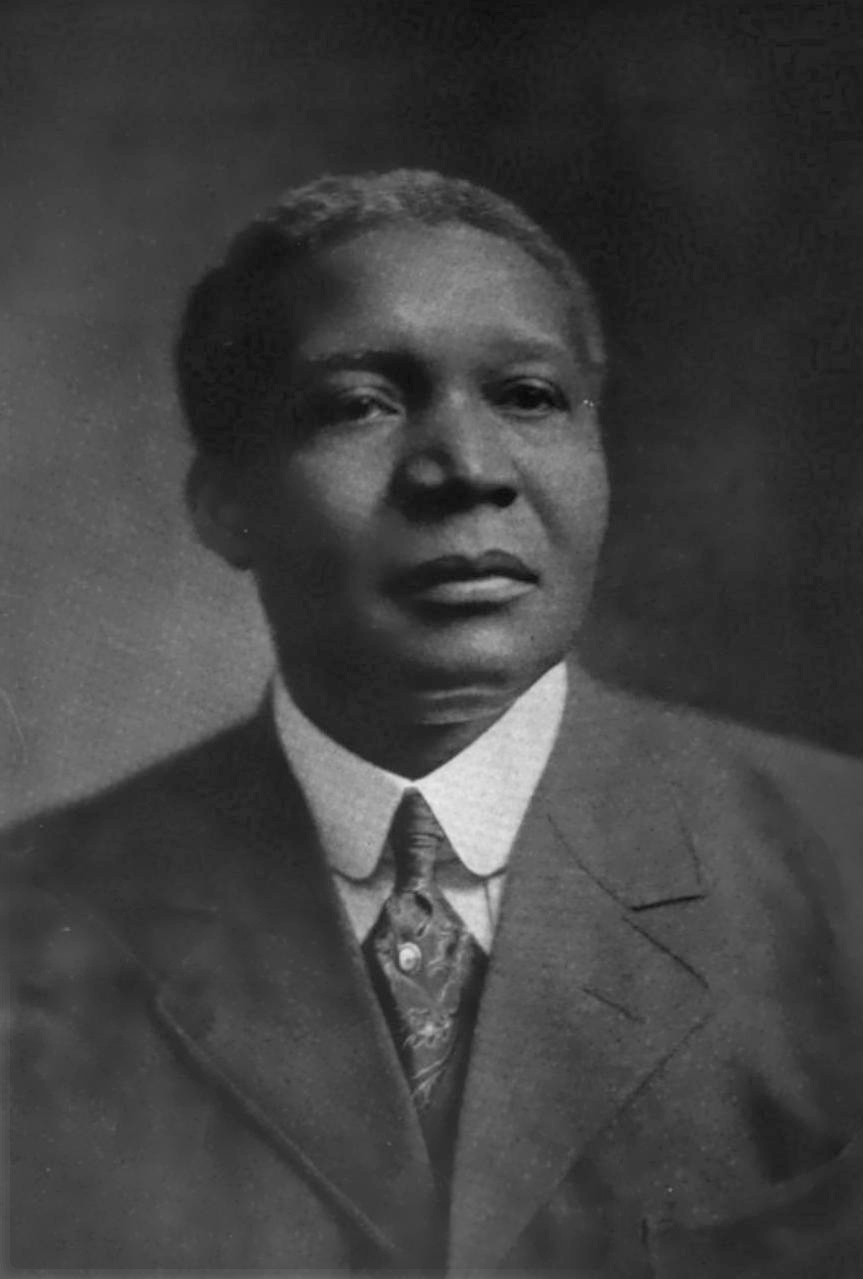
Photograph of Robert R. Moton in 1916. One of the two elementary schools constructed in the Desire Projects was named after him.

== Schools ==
Two elementary schools, Robert R. Moton and Henderson H. Dunn, were included in the construction of the Desire Housing Project. Because the schools did not account for the large number of students, many children had to go in shifts. There were no playgrounds.

== Conditions ==
Conditions in Desire were poor before residents even moved into their complexes. Many problems began because of the lack of building foundations: instead of concrete being laid down, the buildings were all set on wet soil which caused the structures to sink. Porches broke away from homes, etc. Gas, water, and sewer lines were also laid improperly, resulting in utility leakages. Desperate for housing, many residents moved into Desire and stayed, regardless of the conditions. Many people suffered a lack of privacy due to the small amount of space. Many shared hallways, porches, and courtyards, although this is a common attribute of most apartment dwellings.

The surrounding area was isolated and lacked basic essentials for residents such as stores, churches, and bus routes. Many people would sit on their porches because their living quarters were dark and smelled of sewage. The mud that children played in contained broken glass.

== History ==
1949-Federal Government program gives $300 million to public housing authorities to clear inner-city slums and build ever-bigger projects, including high-rises to span throughout the 50s and 60s. Several other buildings were cleared to make room, including the Hideaway Club, where Fats Domino played regular gigs.

1956- April 9-Six weeks before Desire opened, Tenants Association reports stated that “It is undesirable, for many reasons and finally that it is unsafe for human habitation”.

1956-May 21-$23 Million Desire Housing projects become open to the public; residents start to move in.

- A further adjustment for the tenants that arrived to fill Desire's first 508 units in the summer
- Desire housing project becomes a real scandal and blight on public housing in New Orleans

1965-Hurricane Betsy puts Desire under 6 feet of water, resulting in broken pipes.

1970-Largest, poorest housing development in New Orleans

- 10,594 residents, 8,312 (75%) under the age of 21

1970-2 spectacular shootouts by Black Panther Party and police authorities from the local, state, and federal levels.

- September 15-Shootout with police and Panthers on Piety Street result in no deaths; 12 panthers arrested for murder charges. All Panthers were found not guilty (Showdown in Desire).
- October 25-Black Panther Party evicted by landlord and relocates headquarters from Piety Street to Desire Housing Project building #3315
- November 19-NOPD raid Black Panther headquarters in attempts to evict them in a final standoff. Chief Clarence Giarrusso sends in 250 armed cops backed by a tank and helicopters. No one was killed and no shots were fired. This was in large part due to the fact that Desire residents, many of them children, surrounded the panther apartment to protect the Panthers and stayed there until Chief called his men back to their buses and left.
- November 26-Police disguise themselves as priests and postal workers and raid the Panther Headquarters inside the Desire Housing apt building #3315, shooting Panther Betty Powell in the shoulder as she tried to slam the door on them. They arrested all 6 panthers inside and charged them with attempted murder and violation of the Federal Firearms act. All Panthers were eventually acquitted.

1971-Both Panther headquarters in Piety Street and Desire burn to the ground.

1979-HUD develops a system for assessing the performance of local housing authorities (HANO) of New Orleans finding them to be “troubled”.

1987-Congress passes a law mandating that torn-down housing units be replaced on a one-for-one basis, low-income housing- leaving Desire left to decay.

1988-HUD revised its agreement with HANO to give the federal agency more oversight of persistent “operational and managerial deficiencies related to poor maintenance of the housing stock.” Streetcar named desire use to run through

- Sits on land well outside the city's core, hidden away between a truck route, railroad tracks, and Superfund sight
- Streets named by an eighteenth-century Creole who first developed that part of town: Industry, Abundance, Benefit, Humanity, Desire, Piety

1989-Larry Jones (HANO) blames racism for the problems in Desire. Goal behind construction of the projects was quantity not quality (Reagan era- HUD funding for housing programs cut 76%, projects slid into despair)

1990-Public housing becomes even more grim in New Orleans. Most economically disadvantaged areas in the United States are housing projects which are direct results of federal programs.

1991-Revitalize Desire by razing some buildings * Pushed to Sept 1992, then March 1993 * Some people left because they told things would be fixed, other left because of the horrible conditions.

1993-A triple killing leaves three bullet-riddled bodies at the end of a strip of the complex referred to at the time as “Cocaine Alley.”

1994-HANO's reputation declines as HUD conducts a general audit visiting 150 units in a random sample. All 150 flunk HUD's basic quality standards being called “indecent, unsafe, unsanitary conditions”. 21,000 outstanding work orders which had been backlogged for routine maintenance, holes in the walls and ceilings, loose and peeling paint, steady leaks from the faucets, roach infestations. Desire was one of the first HOPE VI grant winners, receiving a $44.2 million award from HUD. 900 residents, 14 murders at the complex. Many units uninhabitable. Gunshots were normal. Majority of the units in Desire were vacant at a time when there was more than 2,000 names on the waiting list for public housing in New Orleans. “Words can’t express how much we suffer here in Desire”.

1994-1995-HANO scores lower on HUD's assessment scale than any other major housing authority in the country.

1995- The process of tearing down Desire officially begins. New Desire would only have half as many units as the old one, there would be a new home for every family still living in the complex. (590 families according to HANO)

1997-At least 252 units had been destroyed, not much changes in Desire. Local out of state congressmen raised objections about the Desire plan and challenged the site's usefulness for public housing.

1998- 408 units are torn down and the plan is revised again lowering the number of units in the envisioned final development to about 500. Nothing has been built and residents begin to become suspicious.

2001-Eviction notices are given to residents as some refuse to leave. HANO says that all the Desire buildings will have to come down before any new units can be built, because of laying new sewer lines, cutting new streets, and so on. 50 Families still live in Desire's last buildings. HANO's letters came telling residents that they need to move saying conditions will be dangerous if they stay during construction. Residents begin to believe the officials just wanted them out.

- Desire Area Residents Council files a lawsuit alleging that the eviction notices have violated written agreements between HANO and Desire tenants over decision-making procedures affecting the site's redevelopment.

2002-Residents win a court case forcing the Housing Authority to spend $200,000 to fix up its units. Desire residents win the right to remain in the remnants of Desire. Everyone will have the right to come back as long as they go through screenings. (HANO). 153 residents are a part of the Section 8 program which 85% of New Orleans landlords refuse to take part in.

2003- HANO's plan promised 283 public housing eligible townhouse style rental units. Another 142 units will be made available to renter with a low-income housing tax-credit. Also, 150 units have been added in the form of an “affordable homeownership program.” HANO is no longer accepting new public housing applications. Desire, which once had over 262 buildings, was completely torn down by 2003. Two of the original buildings were preserved for historical purposes.

2005- The area was in the midst of re-development and new construction when Hurricane Katrina inundated the historically low-lying area.

2006- Public housing in New Orleans is reduced by 85%.

2007- The U.S. Department of Housing and Urban Development Secretary announced that by July 2007, 100 of the eventual 500 houses would be built, as part of a development dubbed the "New Desire" or "Abundance Square."

== Black Panthers ==
The Black Panthers set up a New Orleans chapter in 1970 by establishing themselves in the Desire Housing Projects which lasted for about three months. The chapter consisted of men and women who created several programs to help the residents of the Desire area. The Panthers took it upon themselves to help the impoverished neighborhood in several ways. These services included free breakfasts which are claimed by some to have helped feed over 100,000 children, free clothing, donations from merchants, as well as establishing self-respect and community responsibilities. They also taught self-defense, and fundraising and organizing tasks and responsibilities for parenting. The relationship between the Panthers and the residents grew strong making it essential to the survival of the group. After a three-month positive relationship between the Panthers, the resident's demands soon became the demands of the Party. This encouraged residents support the Panthers in their time of need as they placed themselves between the power group headquarters and the authorities during a raid in November 1970. Many community members were arrested because of their support.

== Shootout ==
Two confrontations took place between the Black Panther Party and authorities in the Desire housing projects. Both can be remembered by several residents, authorities, and Black Panthers themselves. The first episode which took place was known as a thirty-minute war. This was after several months of police infiltration of the power group. Police cruisers along with buses and newsmen made their way to Desire on September 15, 1970, around 8:30 a.m. Hundreds of police officers who were local, state, and federal authorities arrived at the headquarters of the Black Panthers on Piety Street. About fifteen minutes from arrival shots could be heard from machine guns as well as automatic rifles aimed at the Panther headquarters. Many of the power group members inside the house recall the house they were in “melting” from all the heat that was being aimed at them as well as wrapping bread in towels to cope with the tear gas trying to snake them out. Remarkably after the shooting no bloodshed had occurred from either side. After the Panthers had surrendered they were taken to New Orleans Parish Prison. Thirteen people ages ranging from fourteen to twenty-seven were arrested after the shooting each with a bond set at $100,000. About 400 residents of Desire had gathered behind the committee headquarters and shouted antipolice slogans in support of the Panthers. Several days after the incident some Panthers headed back to headquarters and reopened. By October 25, 1970, headquarters had been moved to apartment #3315 in Desire. As months went by tensions began to escalate between Panthers and police. Although as tensions grew so did the mass amount of support from the residents of Desire who were determined to support the group which had helped them significantly. By November 17, 1970, policemen headed back to Desire to evict the Panthers permanently from their location. When they arrived they were confronted with several objects being tossed in their direction from residents. At around 11:45 p.m. as a tank began advancing towards the building of headquarters members of the community filled the streets and put themselves in a standoff between the authorities, only held back by Desire leaders who restrained them from making any advances. Residents said they would stand their ground as long as police presence continued. Five people were shot but no deaths resulted in this second confrontation.

== Reports ==
Robert H. Tucker Jr. assisted Mayor Moon Landrieu and made official reports about the standards of living in the Desire projects. After three days of living in the projects Tucker reported back to the mayor with his findings. They stated “Life in any multi-family structure for the low income family is a very difficult proposition to say the least.” After this report the Desire could be known as one of the worst public housing projects ever put into place. Tucker saw children who would swim in clogged sewers, as well as families who were scared to leave their homes at night because of assault, robbery, muggings, and rape. Piles of garbage went uncollected for weeks. Desire was basically removed from the rest of the city of New Orleans not only in geography but in culture as well. About 61% of the families in Desire lived on less than $3,000 a year. People who got food-stamps would be targeted and threatened. The day people received their welfare was also the day the food market would make prices higher. The results of this report by Tucker were an eleven pointed plan weeks before the shootout given to the mayor in attempts to change some conditions in Desire for the better.

== Documentary ==
This film Desire documents a five-year collaborative effect between Julie Gustafson and a group of teenage girls from New Orleans completed in 2005 before Hurricane Katrina. It starts in the Desire Housing Projects with girls who are taught to make videos about their lives discussing what they want out of life and if they think they will get it. The documentary reviews the lives of teenage girls from Desire and compares them to other neighborhoods. They review how life is in the projects including their families, social, and economic backgrounds.

== In popular culture ==
The 2007 crime film Waters Rising features two Hurricane Katrina evacuees, criminal brothers from the Desire Projects named Gangsta (Michael Anthony Jackson) and Killer (Andrae Noel). The storm and their relocation to Houston, Texas, profoundly affected their fates.

The 2006 documentary Welcome to New Orleans, featuring Malik Rahim (Donald Guyton) who survived the Desire shootout and Desert Storm veteran Dennis Kyne, shares the story of almost 20,000 volunteers saving Algiers after Hurricane Katrina.

In the 2020 Showtime miniseries Your Honor, the Desire Crew is mentioned as one of the city's most notorious gangs.

== See also ==
- Neighborhoods in New Orleans
