= Desiree Ortiz =

Venezuelan television host

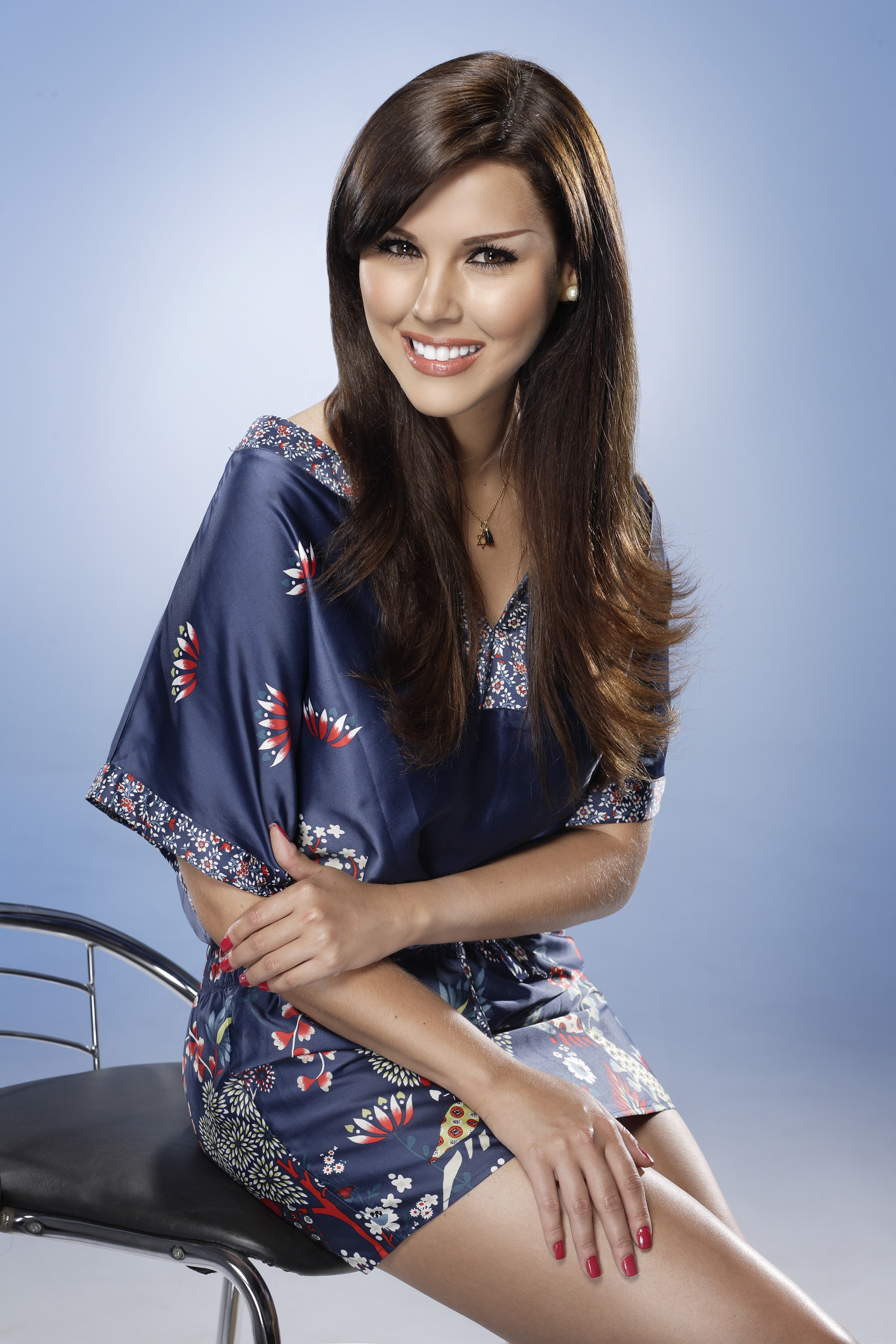
- Born: Desiree Ortiz Perez; December 28, 1981 (age 44)
- Education: Universidad Santa María (Caracas)
- Occupations: Actress; journalist; television host; model
- Years active: 1996 - present
- Known for: Latina VJ Venevisión, Televen, RCN, TV Azteca, Univisión and Fox Sports
- Relatives: Denisse Ortiz Perez (Miss Canaima contestant in the Miss Venezuela 2006)
- Awards: Premios Fox Sports en español (journalism awards)

Desiree Ortiz is a Venezuelan television personality who has hosted "Show Business", on-air in fourteen countries through the Venevisión network, Venevisión Plus and Mega TV.

Venevision (Ruge Manía) and Fox Sports were part of the journalist's early work.

== Early life ==
She lived and worked in Spain, Mexico, Costa Rica, Colombia, Argentina and the United States. After commuting between Los Angeles and Miami, she settled down in the United States. In 2006, she acted as host for SKY Latin America's coverage of the 2006 FIFA World Cup, leading to her image being broadcast across the region.

She has also acted as hostess for Fashion TV in Bogotá, Colombia, covered the Mar del Plata music festivals in Argentina for On DirecTV, Mexico's TV Azteca's Sports, Univision's Control, France-Cannes Festival and The Fox Sports Awards.

Desiree has been featured in advertising campaigns for Miu Miu, 7 Up, Telefónica Movistar, Ferrero Rocher, EFE Ice Cream, Fiz, Mulco, Colgate (toothpaste), Armandeus hair stylists among others. Desiree has hosted the Latin Angel Special, a television show dedicated to the beauty of women, gastronomy and tourism.
