= Danny Ortiz =

Guatemalan footballer (1976–2004)

Dany Ortiz
- Ortiz with Guatemala in 2002

Personal information
- Full name: Josué Danny Ortiz Maldonado
- Date of birth: July 26, 1976
- Place of birth: Las Palmas, Guatemala
- Date of death: February 29, 2004 (aged 27)
- Place of death: Guatemala City, Guatemala
- Height: 1.84 m (6 ft 1/2 in)
- Position: Goalkeeper

Youth career
- Carchá
- Coatepeque
- Ayutla
- Teculután

Senior career*
Years	Team	Apps	(Gls)
1998–1999	Suchitepéquez		
2000–2001	Carchá		
2001–2002	Comunicaciones		
2002–2004	Municipal		

International career^{‡}
2001–2002	Guatemala	10	(0)
- * Club domestic league appearances and goals as of 28 February 2010 ‡ National team caps and goals as of 28 February 2010

Josué Danny Ortiz Maldonado (July 26, 1976 – February 29, 2004) was a Guatemalan professional footballer who played as a goalkeeper.

== Club career ==
Ortíz played for both Guatemalan giants Comunicaciones and CSD Municipal as well as for CD Suchitepequez and Deportivo Carchá. He succeeded national team goalkeeper Edgar Estrada between the Comunicaciones goalposts when Estrada moved to Municipal, only to take him to Municipal himself a year later in a swap deal which returned Estrada to the Cremas.

== International career ==
Ortiz made his debut for Guatemala in a February 2001 friendly match against Panama and had collected a total of 10 caps, scoring no goals. He represented his country at the UNCAF Nations Cup 2001 and at the 2002 CONCACAF Gold Cup. He was deemed the natural successor to Edgar Estrada in the national team until his premature death.

His final international was an October 2002 friendly match against Jamaica.

== Death ==
During a 2004 match with Municipal against their eternal rivals and his former club CSD Comunicaciones, the 211th clasico between the clubs, Ortiz collided with Mario Rodríguez of the opposing team, suffering a torn pericardium. He was taken to the Hospital Centro Médico where Ortiz died two hours later.

He became the third Municipal player after Jhonny Aldana and goalkeeper Rolando Marroquín to die while active for the club. He is survived by his wife and 2 children.

Ortiz became the namesake of the Josué Danny Ortiz Trophy, awarded to the goalkeeper who concedes the fewest number of goals during each half of the Liga Nacional de Fútbol de Guatemala season.

== See also ==
- List of association footballers who died while playing
