= Manuel Antonio Ortiz =

President of Paraguay

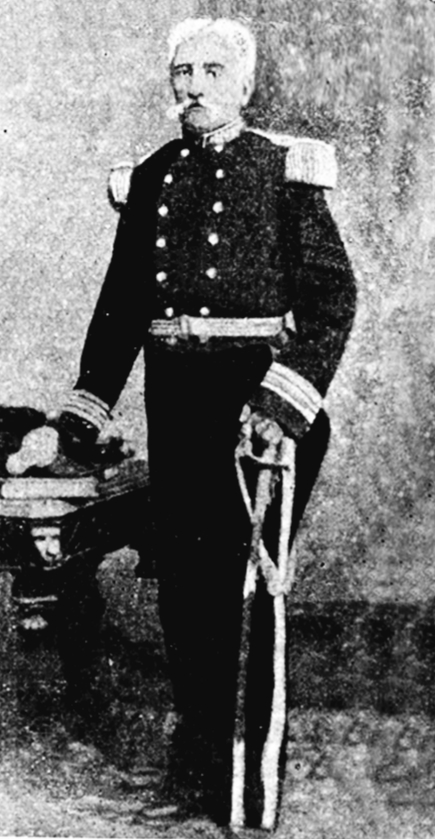

President of the Provisional Junta of Paraguay
- In office 20 September 1840 – 22 January 1841
- Preceded by: José Gaspar Rodríguez de Francia
- Succeeded by: Triumvirate (Juan José Medina, José Gabriel Benítez, José Campos)

Manuel Antonio Ortiz became President of the Provisional Junta of Paraguay on 20 September 1840 following the death of José Gaspar Rodríguez de Francia. He was chairman of the Junta until 22 January 1841, when he was overthrown in a coup. Following his deposition, Juan José Medina established a triumvirate to govern the state.

== History ==
Immediately after the death of Paraguayan dictator José Gaspar Rodríguez de Francia, his former scribe and secretary, Policarpo Patiño, attempted to seize power. He was unsuccessful, and instead a Provisional Junta was established by the commanders Agustin Cañete, Pablo Ferreria, Miguel Maldonado, and Gavino Arroyo, with the mayor Manuel Antonio Ortiz presiding over it. Patiño did play a role in the government, as he was the first Secretary, but it was a less significant role than what he had during the Francia regime.

The government struggled with internal conflicts for most of its existence. Initially, a power struggle arose between Ortiz and Patiño. Eventually, Manuel Zalduondo joined the Junta as an advisor and ordered the arrest of Patiño for his embezzlement under Francia. Patiño committed suicide in jail. The news of his death was received with joy by many, and his body was subsequently paraded around the streets.

The junta proved ineffectual in governing and enacting needed reforms. On January 22, 1841, the government was overthrown in a military coup by Ramon Duré and José Domingo Campos. They imprisoned all members of the Junta and new government was formed.

Political offices
Preceded by José Gaspar Rodríguez de Francia	President of Provisional Junta; 1840–1841	Succeeded by Juan José Medina
