= Florida Projects =

Former housing project located in the Ninth Ward of New Orleans, Louisiana

Florida Avenue Housing Development
- Interactive map of Florida Avenue Housing Development

General information
- Location: New Orleans, LA 70117; United States
- Status: Partially extant (remodeled in 2005)

Construction
- Constructed: 1945–1946

Listing
- Demolished: 1998-2004 (partial)

Other information
- Governing body: Housing Authority of New Orleans

Florida Avenue Projects or Florida Projects is a public housing project in the city of New Orleans. The development was built in 1946 on an 18.5-acre tract of land bounded by Florida Avenue and North Dorgenois, Mazant and Gallier streets in the Upper 9th Ward. It contained 47 two- and three-story brick buildings, arranged around courtyards and largely isolated from the rest of the community, for a total of 734 units housing 1,297 residents. Originally built for whites, it was later desegregated and by the 1970s was becoming predominantly a black project. In the mid-1990s, Florida and nearby Desire Projects were dubbed the most violent housing projects in the nation. In 1994, Florida recorded the highest homicide rate of all HANO developments, with 26 slayings, surpassing the 13 killings in Desire which previous held the highest record a year before. The majority of the Florida killings in 1994 were fueled by drug wars, specifically between the notorious Hardy Boys and the Poonie Crew. The homicide spike in Florida and Desire contributed to New Orleans being dubbed "the nation's murder capital". That year the city's homicide rate reached 424, 47 of those killings occurring in HANO developments.

In 2005, the project was heavily flooded in Hurricane Katrina and was partly demolished by the end of that year. One half of the complex was remodeled.

== Geography ==
Florida Projects is located at 29°58′55″N 90°01′58″W and has an elevation of 0 feet (0.0 m). According to the United States Census Bureau, the district has a total area of 0.09 square miles (0.2 km^{2}). 0.09 square miles (0.2 km^{2}) of which is land and 0.00 square miles (0.0 km^{2}) (0.0%) of which is water.

== Demographics ==
As of the census of 2000, there were 1,604 people, 399 households, and 346 families residing in the neighborhood. The population density was 17,822 /mi^{2} (8,020 /km^{2}).

As of the census of 2010, there were 6 people, 2 households, and 2 families residing in the neighborhood.

== Notable residents ==
- Pimp Daddy
- Mannie Fresh
- Wendy Reed Randall, author, “Once There Was A Girl: A Memoir” about growing up in the Florida Housing Projects. Published December, 2020 by Kharis Publishing.^6

https://www.wendyreedrandall.com/

== See also ==
- Neighborhoods in New Orleans
