= Hail Mary (disambiguation) =

The Hail Mary is a Catholic prayer.

Hail Mary may also refer to:

- Hail Mary pass, a very long forward pass in American football

== Film, television, and literature ==
- Hail, Mary!, a 1970 Soviet spy film
- Hail Mary (film), a 1985 French erotic film
- "Hail Mary" (Terriers), a 2010 television episode
- "The Hail Mary" (Outlander), a 2016 television episode
- Project Hail Mary, a 2021 novel by Andy Weir
  - Project Hail Mary (film), a 2026 film based on the novel
  - Hail Mary, a fictional spaceship from the novel and film

== Music ==
- "Hail Mary" (2Pac song), 1997, from The Don Killuminati: The 7 Day Theory
- "Hail Mary" (Mark Owen song), 2005, from How the Mighty Fall
- Hail Mary, a 2013 album by Dark New Day, or its title track
- Hail Mary (album), 2015, by Iwrestledabearonce

== See also ==
- List of Hail Mary passes
  - 2026 Western Michigan vs. Michigan football game, 2026 Michigan–Western Michigan game
  - Fail Mary, 2012 Packers–Seahawks game
- Hail Mary Cloud, a password-cracking botnet
- Hail Mary of Gold, in Catholicism
- Three Hail Marys, in Roman Catholicism
- Hail Mary English Medium School, Perumpally, Kerala, India
- Ave Maria (disambiguation)
- Hell Mary (disambiguation)
