= Ave Maria (disambiguation) =

The Ave Maria (Hail Mary) is a Catholic prayer addressing Mary, the mother of Jesus.

Ave Maria may also refer

== Films ==
- Ave Maria (1918 film), a British silent film
- Ave Maria (1920 film), an Italian silent film
- Ave Maria (1936 film), a German and Italian film
- Ave Maria (1953 film), a West German drama film
- Ave Maria (1984 film), a French drama film
- Avé Maria, a 2006 Portuguese TV movie starring Beatriz Batarda
- Ave Maria (2015 film), directed by Basil Khalil

== Music ==
=== Albums ===
- Ave Maria, a 1980 album by Plácido Domingo
- Ave Maria, a 1992 album by Stephanie Salas
- Ave Maria – En Plein Air, a 2015 album by Finnish singer Tarja Turunen
- Ave Maria, a 2021 album by Maria Peszek

=== Compositions ===
- "Ave Maria ... Virgo serena", a 15th-century motet by Josquin des Prez
- "Ave Maria" (Schubert) or "Ellens dritter Gesang" (1825), a composition by Franz Schubert
- Ave Maria, WAB 5, a choral setting by Bruckner (1856)
- "Ave Maria", a choral setting by Johannes Brahms (1858)
- "Ave Maria" (Bach/Gounod) (1859), an aria by Charles Gounod, based on a piece by Johann Sebastian Bach
- Ave Maria (Bruckner), motet by Anton Bruckner (1861)
- Ave Maria, WAB 7, a choral setting by Bruckner (1882)
- "Ave Maria", an aria by Giuseppe Verdi, from Otello (1887)
- "Ave Maria" (Verdi), a setting for four voices a cappella (1889)
- "Ave Maria" (Intermezzo), an aria by Pietro Mascagni from Cavalleria rusticana (1890)
- Ave Maria (Stravinsky), motet by Igor Stravinsky (1934)
- "Ave Maria", a choral setting by Franz Biebl (before 1959)
- "Ave Maria" (Vavilov) (1970), an aria by Vladimir Vavilov, falsely ascribed to Giulio Caccini
- "Ave Maria", a choral setting by Morten Lauridsen (1997)
- "Ave Maria", a short composition for soprano and orchestra by Stefano Lentini published on the album Stabat Mater (2013)

=== Songs ===
- "Ave Maria", a song by Mac Miller from his album Faces
- "Ave Maria" (Beyoncé song), 2008
- "Ave Maria", a song by French singer Charles Aznavour
- "Ave María", a song by Spanish singer David Bisbal from his album Corazón latino
- "Ave Maria", a song by Rowland S. Howard from his album Pop Crimes
- "Ave Maria (Survivors of a Different Kind)", a song by Jennifer Rush
- "Ave Mary A", a song by Pink from her album Funhouse
- "Maria (Ave Maria)," originally released in 1972 as a solo single by Korean vocalist Djong Yun, later included as a bonus track on the re-release of Popol Vuh's album Hosianna Mantra.

== Literature ==
- "Ave Maria" (Bahrianyi), a poem by Ukrainian poet and writer Ivan Bahrianyi (1929)

== Places ==
- Ave Maria, Florida, a planned college town near Naples, Florida, U.S.
- Ave María, Málaga, a ward of Carretera de Cádiz district, Málaga, Spain
- Ave Maria Grotto, a landscaped park in Cullman, Alabama
- Ave Maria Lane, a street near St Paul's Cathedral, London, England

== Brands and enterprises ==
- Ave Maria Mutual Funds, U.S. mutual fund family
- Ave Maria Press, a Catholic book publisher
- Ave Maria Radio, radio operator

== Education ==
- Ave Maria College, Melbourne, a Catholic secondary college for girls in Melbourne, Victoria, Australia
- Ave Maria School of Law, a Roman Catholic law school in Naples, Florida
- Ave Maria University, Roman Catholic university in southwest Florida
  - Ave Maria University-Latin American Campus, branch campus of Ave Maria University, located in Nicaragua

== See also ==
- Hail Mary (disambiguation)
- Ave Maryam, a 2019 Indonesian romance drama film
