= Hell Mary =

Hell Mary is an alternative name for Mary Worth of folklore, the legendary Bloody Mary (folklore).

Hell Marys or Hell Mary may also refer to:

== Music ==
- "Hell Mary" (song), a 1998 song by Kevin Moore off the album Dead Air for Radios
- Hell Mary (single), a 7" record by Duane Peters

== Sports ==
- Hell Marys (team), a roller derby team at Texas Rollergirls
- Hell Mary or Fail Mary, a very badly performed Hail Mary pass in gridiron football
  - Hell Mary, an intercepted Hail Mary pass on 24 November 2023; see Dolphins–Jets rivalry#2020s

== Other uses ==
- Hell Mary Hill, South Yorkshire, England, UK; a hill
- Hell Marys (game), a 2014 mobile video game by DeNA
- HellMary (film), a 2019 film starring Felix Ugo Omokhodion

== See also ==
- List of Hail Mary passes
  - Fail Mary (24 September 2012), a failed Hail Mary pass in a Packers–Seahawks game
- Mary Worth (disambiguation)
- Bloody Mary (disambiguation)
- Hail Mary (disambiguation)
- Merry Hell (disambiguation)
- Mary (disambiguation)
- Hell (disambiguation)
