= Three Hail Marys =

Roman Catholic Devotion to the Blessed Virgin Mary

Three Hail Marys are a traditional Roman Catholic devotional practice of reciting Hail Marys as a petition for purity and other virtues. Believers recommend that it be prayed after waking in the morning, and before going to bed. This devotion has been recommended by SS. Anthony of Padua, Alphonsus Liguori, John Bosco and Leonard of Port Maurice. Two saints, Mechtilde and Gertrude the Great, are said to have received revelations from the Blessed Virgin Mary regarding this practice.

It is a common practice for Catholics to offer three Hail Marys for any given problem or petition.

Pope Leo XIII granted an indulgence to those who practice the Three Hail Marys devotion and Pope Benedict XV raised the Confraternity of Three Hail Marys to the Archconfraternity of Three Hail Marys.

== History ==
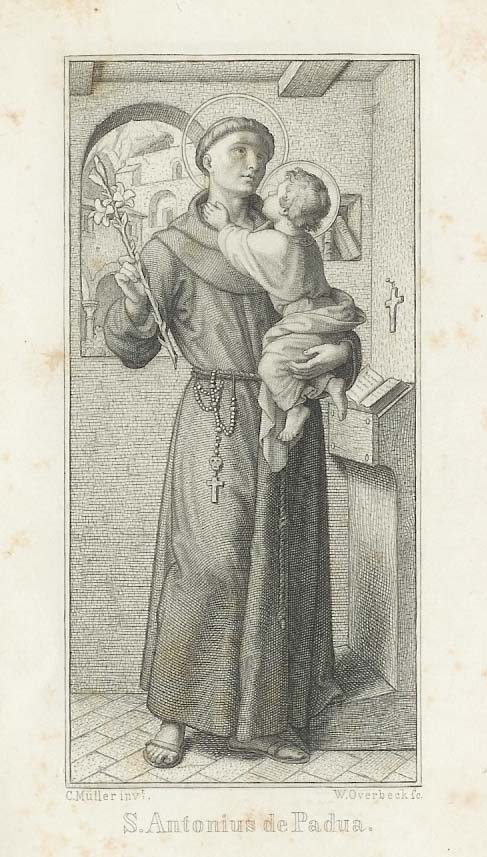
St. Anthony of Padua (1195–1231), one of the first to recommend the practice

The practice of reciting the Hail Mary three times dates at least to the 12th century. One of the first to practice and recommend it was St. Anthony of Padua (1195–1231). His purpose was "to honor the spotless Virginity of Mary and to preserve a perfect purity of mind, heart and body in the midst of the dangers of the world". The practice of saying three Hail Marys in the evening somewhere about sunset had become general throughout Europe in the first half of the 14th century and it was recommended and indulgenced by Pope John XXII in 1318 and 1327.

Many saints have practiced and recommended the devotion of the "Three Hail Mary", such as Leonard of Port Maurice, Bonaventure, John Berchmans, John Baptist Mary Vianney (Cure of Ars), Stanislaus Kostka, Louis Marie Grignion de Montfort, John Joseph of the Cross, John Baptist de Rossi, Gerard Majella, Gabriel of Our Lady of Sorrows, Alphonsus Liguori, Josemaría Escrivá and Blessed Marcellinus Champagnat. The practice was observed by Franciscans and eventually developed into the Angelus prayer.

The Three Hail Marys devotion was spread by Rev. John Baptist of Blois, who founded the Confraternity of Three Hail Marys. Pope Leo XIII granted an indulgence to those who practice the Three Hail Marys devotion and Pope Benedict XV raised the Confraternity of Three Hail Marys to the Arch Confraternity of Three Hail Marys.

== Revelations from the Blessed Virgin Mary ==
Mechthild of Hackeborn of Hackeborn (1241–1299), a Cistercian nun of the convent of Our Lady of Helfta, reportedly experienced three visions of the Virgin Mary. Mechtilde was distressed over her eternal salvation and prayed to the Virgin to be present at the hour of her death. In these appearances, Mary reassured her, and taught her to understand especially on how the Three Hail Marys honor the three persons of the Blessed Trinity. The first prayer recalls the power she received from God the Father to intercede for sinners, the second commemorates the wisdom received from God the Son; and the third, the love she bears, filled by Holy Spirit.

According to St. Gertrude (1256–1301), the Blessed Virgin Mary promised the following: "To any soul who faithfully prays the Three Hail Marys, I will appear at the hour of death in a splendor of beauty so extraordinary that it will fill the soul with heavenly consolation."

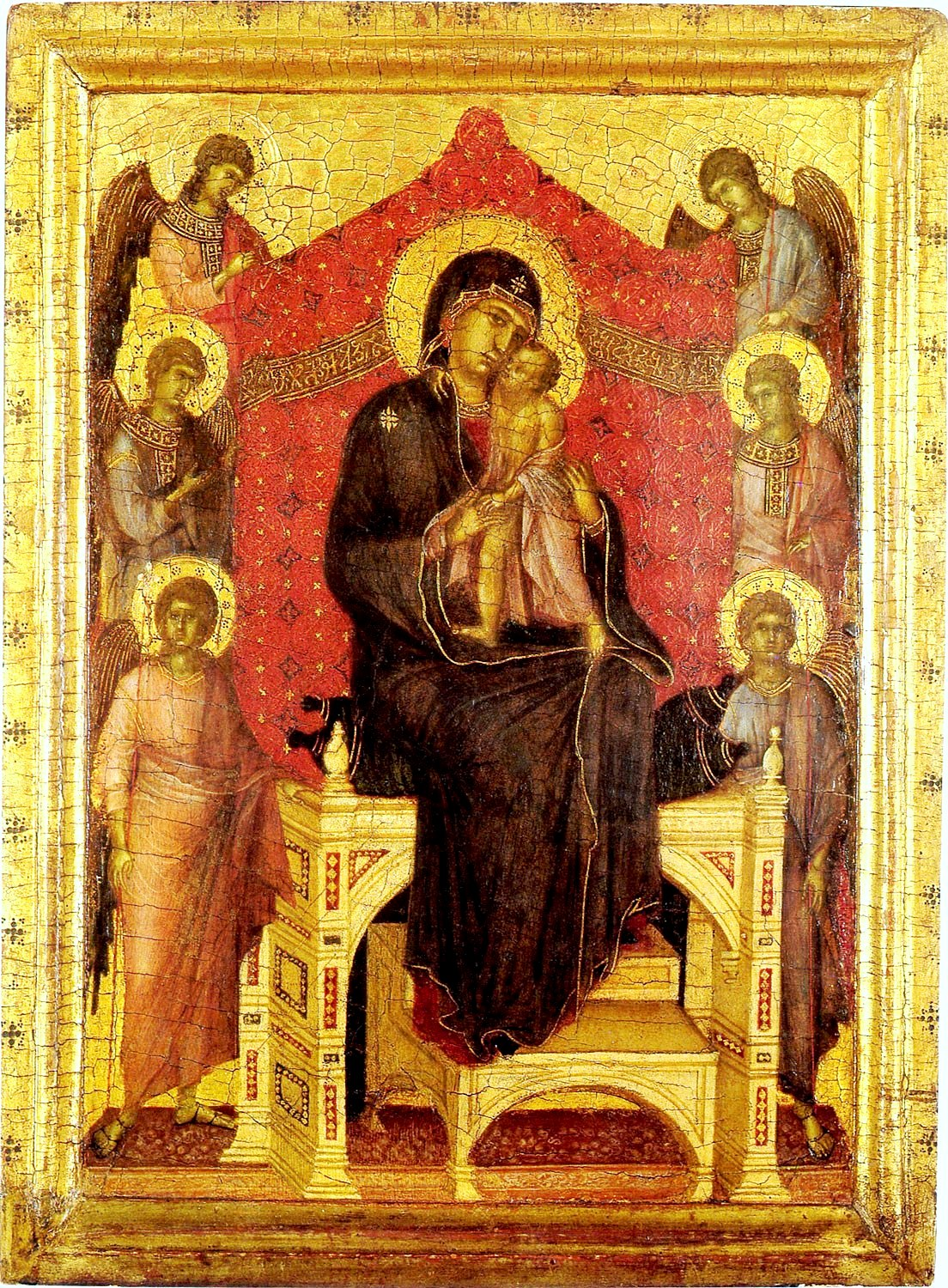
Madonna and Child with Angels, Duccio, 1282

One recommended method is as follows:

Hail Mary, full of grace, the Lord is with thee. Blessed are thou amongst women, and blessed is the fruit of thy womb, Jesus. Holy Mary, mother of God, pray for us sinners, now and at the hour of our death. Amen. O Mary, by thy pure and Immaculate Conception, make my body pure and my soul holy.

== Other recommendations ==
Later on, St. Leonard of Port Maurice had "the three Ave Marias recited morning and evening in honor of Mary Immaculate, to obtain the grace of avoiding all mortal sins during the day and night; moreover, he promised in a special manner eternal salvation to all those who proved constantly faithful to this practice."

Doctor of the Church St. Alphonsus Liguori (1696–1787) adopted this pious practice and highly recommended it. He told parents to train their children to acquire the habit of saying three Hail Marys in the morning and evening. After each Hail Mary, he advised that the following prayer be said: "By thy pure and Immaculate Conception, O Mary, make my body pure and my soul holy."

According to the Pallottine Fathers, after Night Prayers: "Many saints have had the practice of adding three Hail Marys here in honor of Mary's purity for the grace of a chaste and holy life." Thus, it has been recommended as a daily practice for people who have received the Sacrament of Confirmation that they pray the Three Hail Marys for "purity of mind, heart and body" after examination of conscience, before going to bed.

== Adaptations ==
St. Virgilius Council 185, Knights of Columbus, in Newtown, Connecticut, initiated a Three Hail Mary's Prayer Drive in support of those affected by the shootings at Sandy Hook Elementary School. The Council requested other Knights Councils and religious organizations to encourage the praying of one Hail Mary for the deceased and their families, one for first responders and teachers, and one for the community.

One variation attributed to Cardinal Leo Joseph Suenens is to pray the rosary substituting three Hail Marys for the traditional decade.
