= The Sword of Barbarossa =

1921 film

- Directed by: Mario Corsi
- Starring: Carmen Boni
- Production company: Tespi Film
- Distributed by: Tespi Film
- Release date: January 1921
- Country: Italy
- Languages: Silent; Italian intertitles

The Sword of Barbarossa (Italian: La scimitarra di Barbarossa) is a 1921 Italian silent film directed by Mario Corsi.

== Cast ==
- Olimpia Barroero
- Ludovico Bendiner
- Carmen Boni
- Rina Calabria
- Teresa Calabria
- Amos Incroci
- Lina Millefleurs
- Luigi Moneta
- Enrico Piacentini
- Thea Sprenger
- Ernesto Treves
- Carlo Troisi - Ave Maria (1920 film)
- Gino Viotti

== Bibliography ==
- Stewart, John. Italian film: a who's who. McFarland, 1994.
