= Pieta prayer booklet =

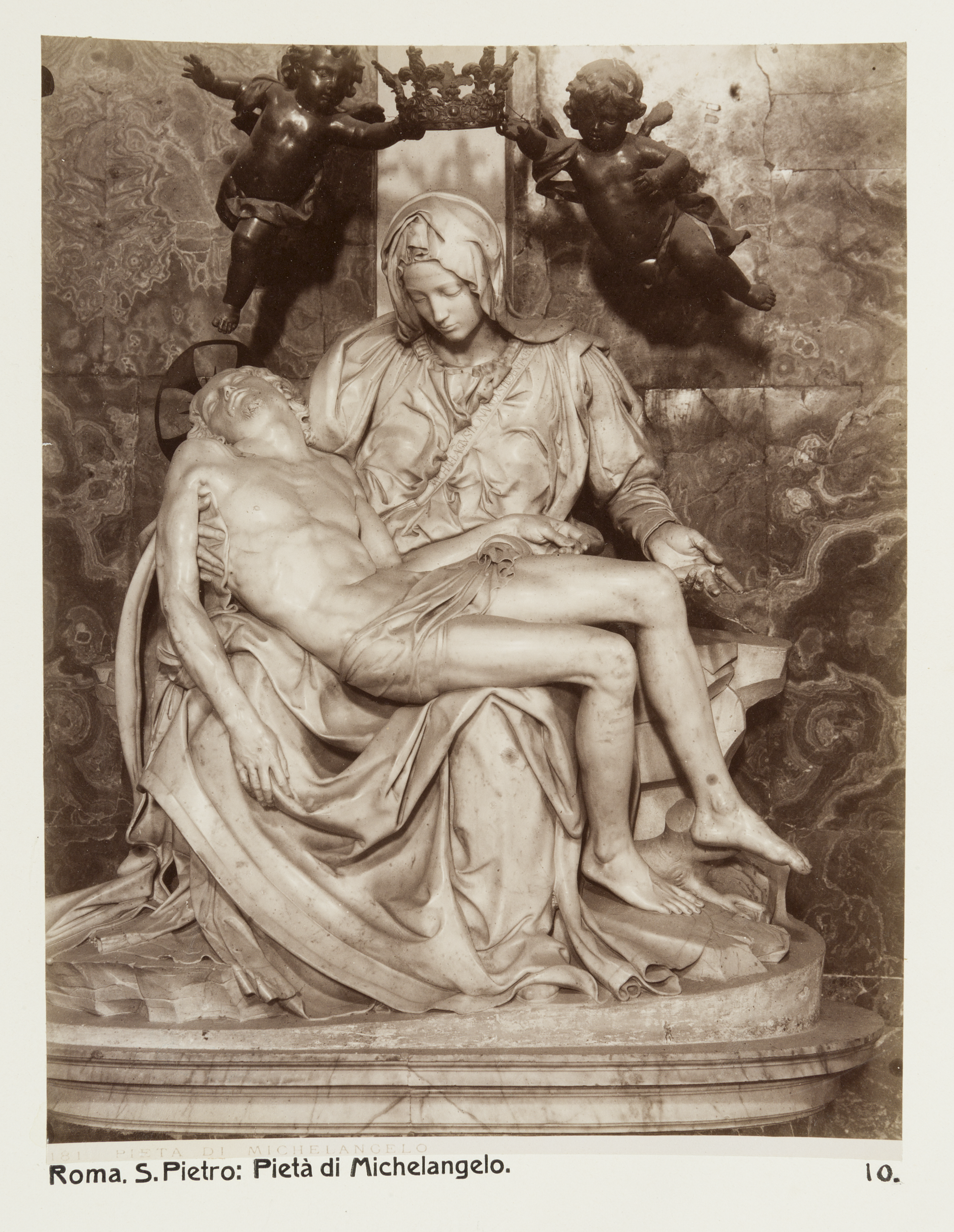
Michelangelo's Pietà

The Pieta prayer booklet is a book of Roman Catholic prayers. the name of the bookled, Pietà, comes from the cover photograph of Michelangelo's Pietà.

The booklet originates from Michigan in 1970’s. It was compiled by Harry Faulhaber and his wife Lillian and a friend in San Damiano, Italy. Since then, over nine million books have been printed. The publisher and copyright owner of the book is Miraculous Lady of Roses, Hickory Corners, Michigan. Booklet contains also many prayers and devotions originating from private revelation. The book has been translated into Spanish and French.

The book includes among other things:

- The 15 prayers of St. Bridget of Sweden
- Ave Maris Stella
- Prayer for Daily Neglects
- Hail Mary of Gold
- An Act of Contrition
- Prayer to the Infant of Prague
- Prayers after Mass and Communion
- The Rosary and scapular
- Short Way of The Cross
- Prayer to the Shoulder Wound of Christ
- In Honor of the Holy Wounds of Jesus Christ
- The Spiritual Communion
- Prayer or Blessing Against Storms
- The Angelus
- Chaplet of St. Michael
- Salve Regina
- Daily Prayer to Guardian Angel
- The Golden Arrow
- Catena Legionis (The Magnificat)
- Litany of humility
- Efficacious Novena to Sacred Heart (used by Padre Pio)
