= Mechthild of Hackeborn =

Saxon Christian saint, Benedictine nun

Saint Mechtilde OSB
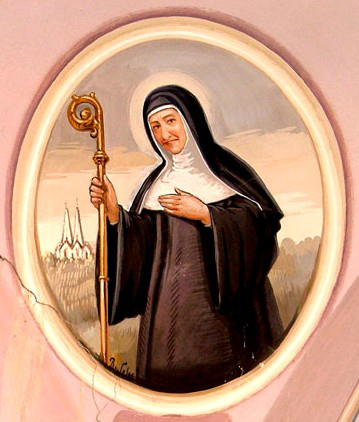
- Mechtilde of Hackeborn

Virgin
- Born: c.1241 Helfta
- Died: 19 November 1298; Helfta
- Venerated in: Catholic Church; Anglican Communion
- Feast: 19 November
- Attributes: Scales and a sword, heart, book and dove
- Patronage: Against blindness

Mechtilde of Hackeborn, OSB, also known as Mechtilde of Helfta (born Matilda von Hackeborn-Wippra; 1240/1241 – 19 November 1298), was a Saxon Benedictine nun known for her musical talents and spiritual revelations. At the age of 50, Mechtilde went through a grave spiritual crisis, as well as physical suffering. In the modern Benedictine calendar, her feast is celebrated on the anniversary of her death, November 19. She died in the convent of Helfta, near Eisleben.

== Birth and baptism ==
Born Matilda von Hackeborn-Wippra, in 1240 or 1241, she belonged to one of the noblest and most powerful Thuringian families; her sister was the illustrious Abbess Gertrude of Hackeborn. The family of Hackeborn belonged to a dynasty of Barons in Thuringia who were related to the Hohenstaufen family and had possessions in northern Thuringia and in the Harz Mountains. Some writers have considered that Mechtilde von Hackeborn and Mechtilde von Wippra were two distinct persons, but, as the Barons of Hackeborn were also Lords of Wippra, it was customary for members of that family to take their name indifferently from either, or both of these estates.

Mechtilde was considered so fragile at birth that the attendants, fearing she might die unbaptized, hurried her off to a priest who was preparing to say Mass. He was thought to be a person of "great sanctity," and, after baptizing the child, is reported to have said "What do you fear? This child most certainly will not die, but she will become a saintly religious in whom God will work many wonders, and she will end her days in a good old age."

== Early life ==
When Mechtilde was seven years old, she was taken by her mother on a visit to her elder sister Gertrude, who at that time was a nun in the Cistercian monastery in Rodersdorf. Mechtilde became so enamoured of the cloister that her parents yielded to her requests and allowed her to enter the novitiate. Here, being highly gifted in mind as well as in body, she made remarkable progress in virtue and learning.

Ten years later (1258), she followed her sister, who was now abbess and had transferred the monastery to an estate at Helfta, which had been given to her by her brothers Louis and Albert. As a nun, Mechtilde was soon recognized for her humility, her fervour, and the amiability which had characterized her from childhood. She joined the convent and eventually became the headmistress of the convent school. Mechtilde's duties in the convent included looking after the library, illuminating manuscripts, and writing her own texts in Latin. Mechtilde composed many prayers. In 1261, the abbess committed to her care a five year-old child, who in later generations became known as Gertrude the Great.

== Musical and spiritual gifts ==
Mechthild was famous for her musical talents and beautiful voice, earning her the title of the "Nightingale of Helfta"; she reported that Christ called her his "nightingale" in her visions. She held the office of domina cantrix until her death, presiding over the sacred music in her convent and training the choir.

She was said to never tire of praising God, even when experiencing severe physical suffering. Both troubled people and learned Dominicans consulted her for spiritual advice.

== Revelations ==
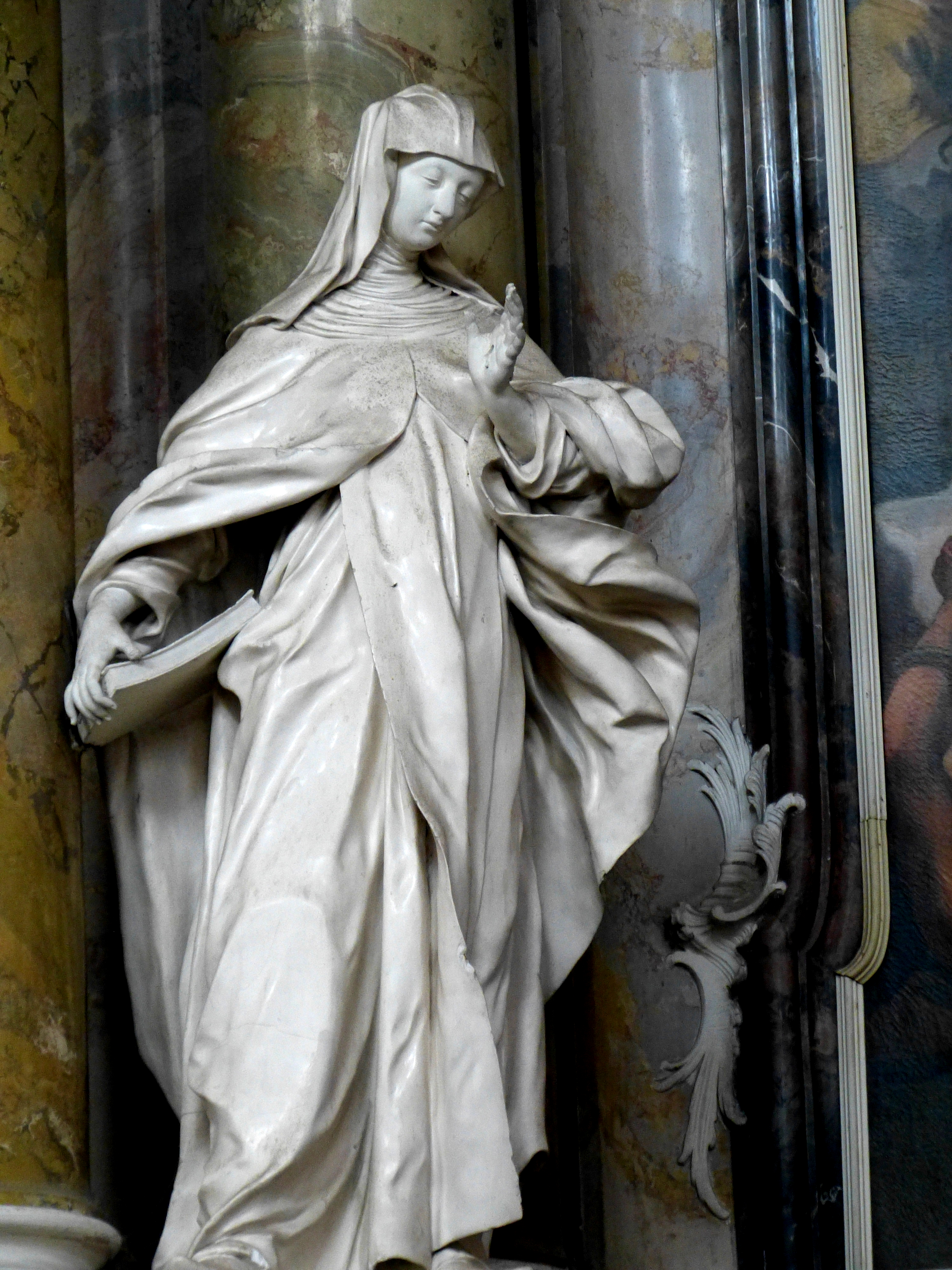
Statue of Saint Mechthild of Hackeborn at the Altar of Saint John of Nepomuk, located at Engelszell Abbey

The Lord would say to Mechtilde: "Everything you have and by which you can please Me you have from Me and through Me." In one extraordinary vision, she perceived that "the smallest details of creation are reflected in the Holy Trinity by means of the Humanity of Christ, because it is from the same earth that produced Them that Christ drew His Humanity."

While Julian of Norwich (1342–about 1416) is the most famous English author to employ the idea of God as mother, the concept did not originate with her. Anselm of Canterbury (1033–1109) had already fostered devotion to "our Lord, our Mother" in his widely used Orationes. The Cistercians and Carthusians spread it by the use of these prayers in their monasteries, and women such as Marguerite d'Oyngt (d. 1310) and Mechthild of Hackeborn took it up.

In the description of her visions, Christ, the Virgin, and other members of the hierarchy of heaven appear as living realities. Mechtilde was particularly fond of the angels, whom she loved to picture as the associates of men on earth and in heaven.

=== Devotion of the three Hail Marys ===
Mechtilde was concerned about her eternal salvation, so she prayed that the Virgin Mary would assist her at the hour of death. Mary appeared to her and reassured her, saying: "Yes, I will! But I wish, for your part, that you recite three Hail Marys every day, remembering in the first the Power received from the Eternal Father, in the second the Wisdom received from the Son, with the third one the Love that has filled the Holy Spirit". The Virgin Mary taught her to pray and to understand especially how the three Hail Marys honor the three persons of the Trinity.

=== Devotion to the Sacred Heart of Jesus ===
Both Mechthilde and Gertrude of Helfta became ardent devotees and promoters of devotion to Jesus' heart due to its appearance in many of their visions. The idea of hearing the heartbeat of God became very important to the medieval saints who nurtured this devotion. Both Mechtilde and Gertrude (d. 1302) perceived Jesus' heart as the breast of a mother, and considered the blood of Jesus in the Eucharist to be as nourishing as the milk a mother gives to feed her child.

In one vision, Mechtilde reported that Jesus said, "In the morning let your first act be to greet My Heart and to offer Me your own. Whoever breathes a sigh toward Me, draws Me to himself."

One of the visions recounted by Mechtilde states that Jesus, having appeared to her, commanded her to love him ardently, and to honor his Sacred Heart in the Blessed Sacrament as much as possible. He gave her his Sacred Heart as a pledge of his love, as a place of refuge during her life and as her consolation at the hour of her death. From this time, Mechtilde had an extraordinary devotion to the Sacred Heart, and she is said to have obtained "such great graces from it that she was accustomed to say that if she had to write down all the favors and all the blessings which she had received by means of this devotion, a large book would not contain them".

In another vision, Jesus himself recommended the Gospels as a source of this devotion. Opening to her the wound of his heart, he said to her: "Consider how great is My Love: If you want to know It well, you will not find It expressed more clearly anywhere than in the Gospel. No one has ever expressed stronger or more tender feelings than these: As My Father has loved Me, so have I loved you (John 15:9)". Her accounts of these visions were later compiled in the Liber Specialis Gratiae.

Pope Francis pays tribute to Mechtilde as one of a number of "holy women" who have "spoken of resting in the heart of the Lord as the source of life and interior peace".

== The Book of Special Grace ==
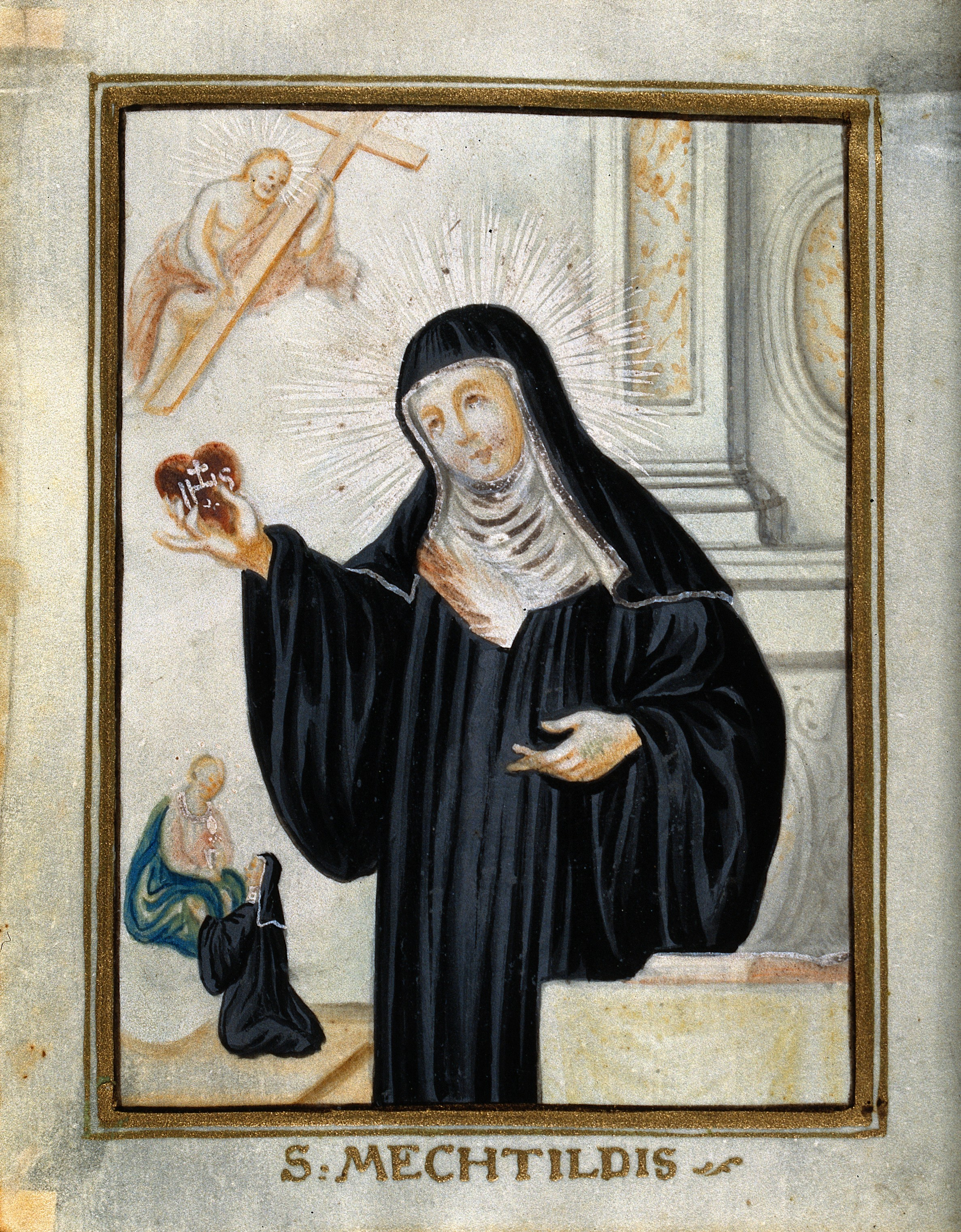
Goauche painting of Saint Mechthilde of Hackeborn

At the age of 50, Mechtilde went through a grave spiritual crisis, as well as physical suffering. She learned that two nuns in whom she had especially confided had noted down the spiritual favours God granted her. Much troubled about this, Mechthilde first had recourse to prayer. She had a vision of Christ holding in his hand the book of her revelations, and saying: "All this has been committed to writing by My Will and Inspiration; and, therefore you have no cause to be troubled about it." He also told her that he wished this book to be called The Book of Special Grace (Liber specialis gratiae) because it would prove such to many. When she understood that the book would tend to God's glory, she ceased to be troubled, and even corrected the manuscript herself. Pope Benedict XVI said that her sister, Gertrude contributed to the sixth book. Immediately after her death it was made public, and copies rapidly multiplied, owing chiefly to the widespread influence of the Friars Preachers.

Giovanni Boccaccio tells how, a few years after the death of Mechtilde, the book of her revelations was brought to Florence and popularized under the title of La Laude di donna Matelda, promoting the devotion to the divine mercy of the Sacred Heart of Jesus. It is related that the Florentines were accustomed to repeat daily before their sacred images the praises learned from Mechtilde's book. Gertrude, who assisted in compiling the Liber Specialis Gratiae, exclaims: "Never has there arisen one like to her in our monastery; nor, alas! I fear, will there ever arise another such!"

Four centuries later, printed chapbooks in the emblem style had made the devotion so widespread in Europe, even in lands where the Protestant reformed churches were in the ascendency, that it was elevated under this name to a universal feast on the liturgical calendar with Mass and Office proper composed by the French cleric John Eudes. (Another female religious, Mary Margaret Alacoque, spread the devotion among urban illiterate lay faithful of France with numerous testimonies of her supernatural visions of Christ's passion imagined as an inflamed pierced heart, encircled with thorns.)

Mechtilde died in the monastery of Helfta, on November 19, 1298. Her feast is celebrated on the anniversary of her death. Along with the body of Gertrude, the body of Mechtilde is most likely still buried at Old Helfta, though the exact spot is unknown.

== Dante's Donna Matelda ==
Critics have long been perplexed as to one of the characters introduced by Dante in his Purgatorio under the name of Matelda. After ascending seven terraces of Mount Purgatory, on each of which the process of purification is carried on, Dante, in Canto xxvii, hears a voice singing: "Venite, benedicti patris mei"; then later, in Canto xxviii, there appears to him on the opposite bank of the mysterious stream a lady, solitary, beautiful, and gracious. To her Dante addresses himself; she it is who initiates him into secrets, which it is not given to Virgil to penetrate, and it is to her that Beatrice refers Dante in the words: "Entreat Matilda that she teach thee this."

Mechtilde's model of the soul's ascent provided the inspiration for his poetic treatment of the Mountain of Purgatory's seven terraces, one for each virtue (or more accurately one each for the purging—or detachment from—each of the seven vices) at the top of which she appears in his closing cantos of the second book of his Divine Comedy.

Most commentators have identified Matilda with Matilda of Tuscany, the spiritual daughter and dauntless champion of Pope Gregory VII, but all agree that beyond the name the two have little or nothing in common. In more places than one the revelations granted to the mystics of Helfta seem in turn to have become the inspirations of the Florentine poet. All writers on Dante recognize his indebtedness to Augustine of Hippo, the Pseudo-Dionysius, Bernard of Clairvaux, and Richard of St. Victor. These are precisely the writers whose doctrines had been most assimilated by the mystics of Helfta, and thus they would the more appeal to the sympathies of the poet.

Dante could not have been a stranger to a book which was so popular among his fellow-citizens. The Purgatorio was finished between 1314 and 1318, or 1319—just about the time when Mechtilde's book was popular. This interpretation is supported by the fact that Mechtilde in her Book of Special Grace (pt. I, c. xiii) describes the place of purification under the same figure of a seven-terraced mountain. For another among many points of resemblance between the two writers compare Purgatorio, Canto xxxi, where Dante is drawn by Matelda through the mysterious stream with pt. II, c. ii. of the Liber Specialis Gratiae. Many scholars, however, deem it more likely that the figure of Matelda in Dante's Divine Comedy had been inspired by the mystic Mechthild of Magdeburg.

== Legacy ==
There is a gilded wooden statue of Mechtilde of Hackborn at the side chapel dedicated to St. Scholastica in the Benedictine Abbey church at Tyniec, Poland. Dressed in a monastic habit, she wears a cross indicating that she is an abbess.

The Sisters of St. Benedict's of Ferdinand, Indiana, sponsor a "Mechtilde of Hackeborn Sacred Music Series", supported through an endowment established by the Verkamp Family in honor of Sister Mary Aquin and Sister Mary Ann Verkamp.

In 2022, The Episcopal Church added both Mechtilde and Gertrude to their calendar of saints with a feast day on 21 November.

== See also ==
- Gertrude of Hackeborn
- Gertrude the Great
- Saint Mechtilde of Hackeborn, patron saint archive
