= Mechthild of Magdeburg =

Christian medieval mystic, Beguine

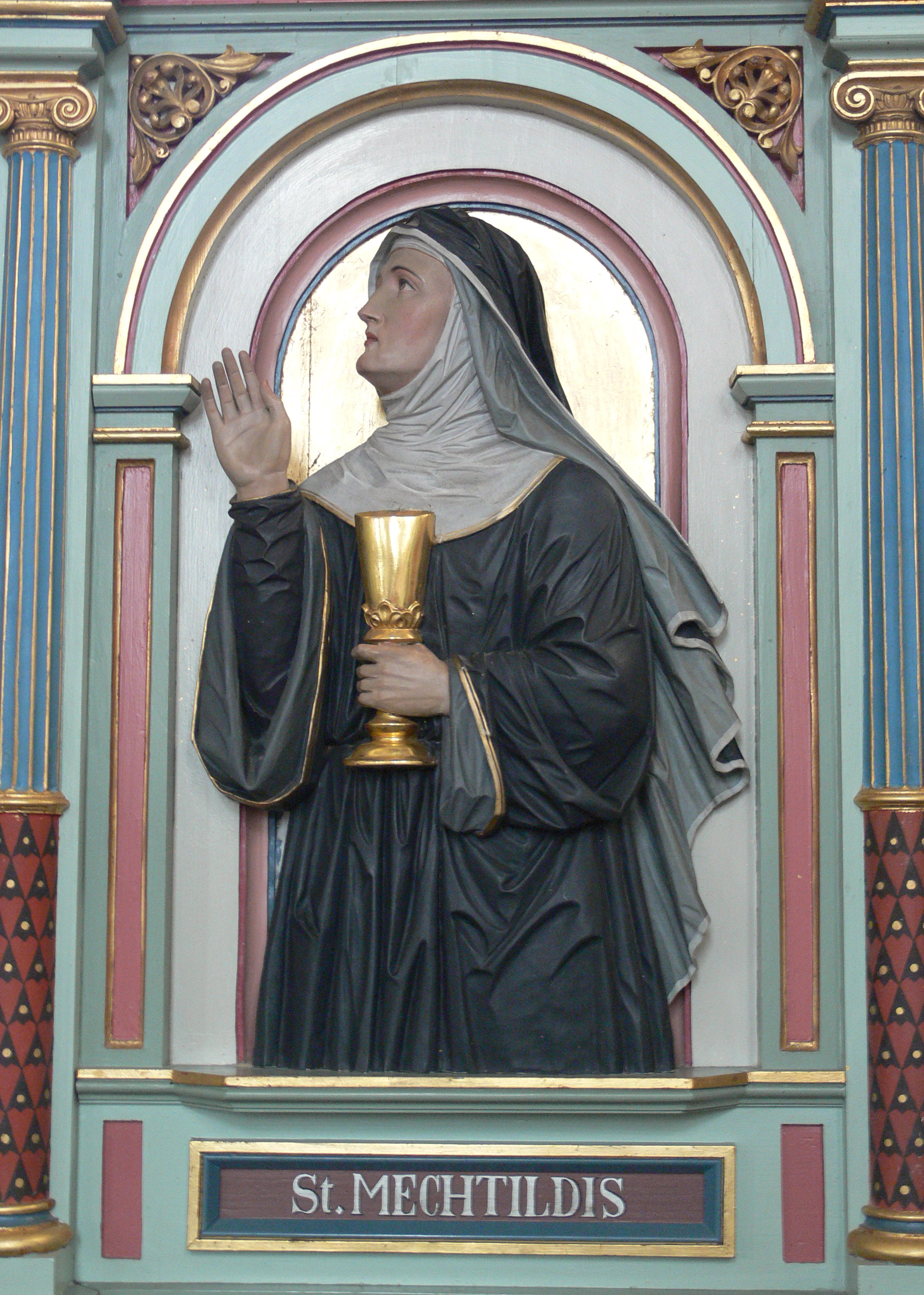
- Born: c. 1207
- Died: c. 1282 – c. 1294

Philosophical work
- Era: Medieval philosophy
- Region: Western philosophy
- School: Christian mysticism
- Notable works: The Flowing Light of the Godhead

Mechthild (or Mechtild, Matilda, Matelda) of Magdeburg (c. 1207 – c. 1282/1294), a Beguine, was a Catholic Christian mystic of the Middle Ages whose book, Das fließende Licht der Gottheit (The Flowing Light of the Godhead), is a compendium of visions, prayers, dialogues and mystical accounts. She was the first mystic to write in Low German.

== Life ==
Definite biographical information about Mechthild is scarce; what is known of her life comes largely from scattered hints in her work. She was born into a noble Saxon family. She had her first vision of the Holy Spirit at the age of twelve according to Flowing Light 4.2. In 1230, she left her home and “renounced worldly honour and worldly riches” to become a Beguine at Magdeburg. There, as with Hadewijch, she appears to have held a position of authority within a Beguine community, according to Flowing Light 6.7. In Magdeburg, she became acquainted with the Dominicans and became a Dominican tertiary. It seems clear that she read many of the Dominican writers; see, for example, the influence of the friars in Flowing Light 4.20-22. It was her Dominican confessor, Henry of Halle, who encouraged and helped Mechthild to compose The Flowing Light.

Her criticism of church dignitaries and her claims to theological insight aroused so much opposition that some called for the burning of her writings. With advancing age, she was not only isolated and the object of widespread criticism but also became blind. Around 1272, she joined the Cistercian Monastery of Helfta, which offered her protection and support in the final years of her life. Here, she completed writing down the contents of the many divine revelations she claims to have experienced. It is unclear whether she formally joined the Cistercian community or resided there and participated in religious services without taking monastic vows. The nuns of Helfta were highly educated, and essential works of mysticism survive from Mechthild's younger contemporaries, Mechthild of Hackeborn and Gertrude the Great.

It is unclear when Mechthild died. 1282 is commonly cited as the date of her death, but some scholars believe she lived into the 1290s.

== Composition ==
Mechthild's book is written in the Middle Low German that was spoken in the region of Magdeburg at the time. It includes phrases in Latin.

== Works ==
Mechthild's writings comprise the seven books of Das fließende Licht der Gottheit (The Flowing Light of Divinity), which was composed between 1250 and 1280. There appear to have been three stages in the evolution of the work. The first five books were finished by about 1260. During the next decade Mechthild added a sixth book. After joining the community of Cistercian nuns at Helfta around 1272, she added a seventh book, rather different in tone from the previous six.

The Flowing Light was originally written in Middle Low German, the language of northern Germany. While her original composition is now lost, the text survives in two later versions. First, around 1290, Dominican friars of the Halle community translated the first six books into Latin. Then, in the mid-fourteenth century, the secular priest Henry of Nördlingen translated The Flowing Light into the Alemannic dialect of Middle High German. This version survives complete in one manuscript and in fragmentary form in three others. The sole surviving copy of The Flowing Light is located in the Einsiedeln library in Switzerland and was rediscovered in 1861.

What is unusual about her writings is that she composed her work in Middle Low German at a time when most wisdom literature was composed in Latin. Thus she is remembered as an early proponent and popularizer of German as a language worthy of the divine and holy. Mechthild's writing is exuberant and highly sophisticated. Her images of Hell are believed by some scholars to have influenced Dante Alighieri's The Divine Comedy, and Mechthild is thought to have been represented by Dante in that work, in the character of Matelda. However, there is no concrete evidence for this and there are important differences in Dante's conception of Hell.

While her work was translated into Latin during her lifetime, it had been largely forgotten by the 15th century. It was rediscovered in the late 19th century by Pater Gall Morel, who published the first edition. Her work has been increasingly studied, both for its academic interest and as a work of devotional literature.

== Remembrance days and artifacts ==
- Catholic: September 16 (venerated as a blessed in the Diocese of Magdeburg), August 15 (according to some sources in the universal Church).
- Evangelical: February 26 (in Calendar of Saints).
- Anglican: November 19 (in Common Worship), May 28 (Episcopal Church).

A sculpture of Mechthild of Magdeburg, The Holy Mechthild von Magdeburg, is on display in the Magdeburg Sculpture Park. It was created by Susan Turcot as part of a project in collaboration with the Art Museum of the Kloster Unser Lieben Frauen. It was installed in the sculpture park in 2010.

== Radio adaptations ==
The Medievalist Hildegard Elisabeth Keller integrated Mechthild von Magdeburg as one of five main female characters in her work The Trilogy of the Timeless, published at the end of September 2011. Selected passages have been included in the radio play The Ocean in the Thimble, which she wrote and staged. In the fictional encounter, Mechthild talks to Hildegard von Bingen, Hadewijch and Etty Hillesum.

== Published editions ==
- Morel, F. Gall (1869). Offenbarungen der Schwester Mechthild von Magdeburg: oder, das fliessende licht der Gottheit [Revelations of Sister Mechthild of Magdeburg: or, the flowing light of the Godhead] (in German). Regensburg: Georg Joseph Manz.
- Monks of Solesmes, ed. (1875–77). Sororis Mechtildis Lux Divinitatis Fluens in Corda Veritatis. Revelationes Gertrudianae et Mechtildianae (in Latin). Vol. 2. Paris/Poitiers: Oudin.
- Mechthild von Magdeburg (1990). Neumann, Hans (ed.). Das fließende Licht der Gottheit: Nach der Einsiedler Handschrift in kritischem Vergleich mit der gesamten Überlieferung [The flowing light of the Godhead: According to the Einsiedeln manuscript in a critical comparison with the entire tradition]. Münchener Texte und Untersuchungen zur deutschen Literatur des Mittelalters (in German). Vol. 100. München: Artemis. [critical edition of the Middle High German text]
- Mechthild of Magdeburg (1998). The flowing light of the Godhead. Classics of Western Spirituality Series. Translated by Tobin, Frank. New York and Mahwah, NJ: Paulist Press. ISBN 9780809137763. (preface by Margot Schmidt) [translation into English]
- Mechthild von Magdeburg (2003). Vollmann-Profe, Gisela (ed.). Das fließende licht der Gottheit [The flowing light of the Godhead]. Bibliothek des Mittelalters (in German). Vol. 19. Translated by Vollmann-Profe, Gisela. Frankfurt a. M.: Deutscher Klassiker Verlag. ISBN 3-618-66195-9.[edition of the Middle High German text with facing translation into modern German]

== Works cited ==
- Bevan, Frances A., ed. (1896). Matelda and the Cloister of Hellfde: Extracts from the Book of Matilda of Magdeburg. London: James Nisbet & Company. (Also available at Internet Archive)
- Lindemann, Kate (14 December 2014). "Mechtild of Magdeburg". Kate Lindemann's Women Philosophers pages. Society for the Study of Women Philosophers.
- McGinn, B. (1998). The flowering of mysticism: Men and women in the new mysticism (1200-1350). Crossroad. pp. 222–244. ISBN 978-0-8245-1742-7.
- Preger, Wilhelm (1873), Dante's Matelda, ein akademischer Vortrag von Wilhelm Preger [Dante's Matelda, an academic lecture by Wilhelm Preger] (in German), Munich
- Preger, Wilhelm (1874). Geschichte der deutschen Mystik im Mittelalter: Nach den Quellen untersucht und dargestellt [History of German mysticism in the Middle Ages: Investigated and illustrated according to the sources] (in German). Vol. 1. Dorffling und Franke.
