= Merry Hell (disambiguation) =

Merry Hell may refer to:

- Merry Hell, Mississippi, USA; an unincorporated community in Simpson County
- Merry Hell (band), a British folk rock band
- Merry Hell!: A Dane with the Canadians (book), a 1939 book by Thomas Dinesen, Danish WWI veteran and Victoria Cross recipient
- Merry Hell: The Story of the 25th Battalion (book), a 2013 book about the 25th Battalion (Nova Scotia Rifles), CEF, WWI Canadian expeditionary unit

== See also ==
- The dictionary definition of play merry hell with at Wiktionary
- Hell Mary (disambiguation)
- Merry (disambiguation)
- Hell (disambiguation)
