= Matelda =

Literary character

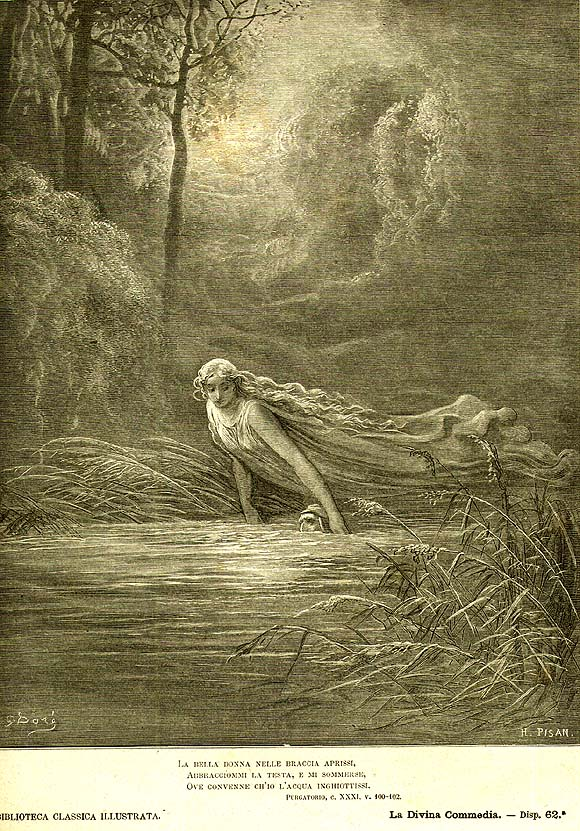
Matelda submerging Dante in Lethe, as depicted by Gustave Doré.

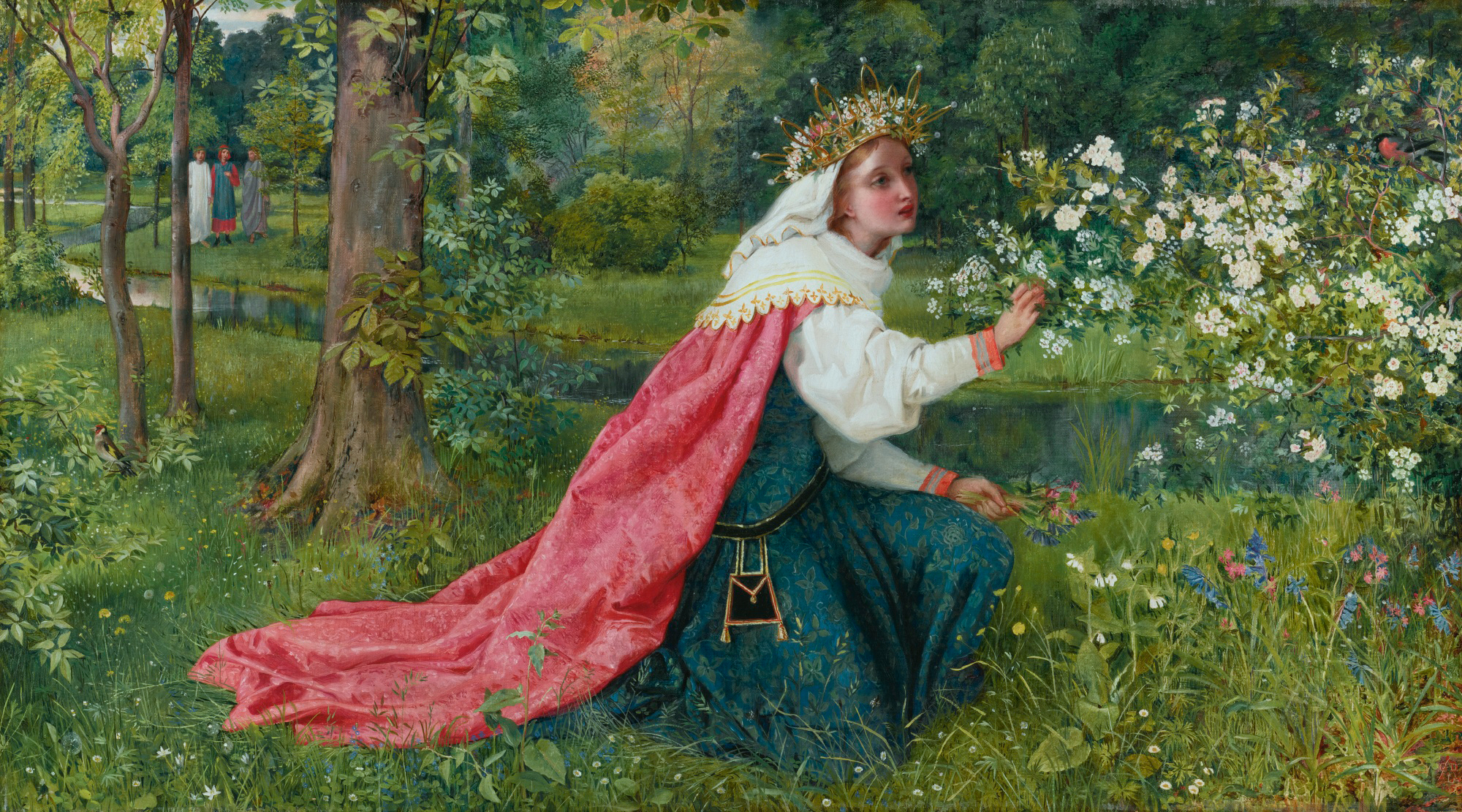
Matilda collecting flowers in a painting by George Dunlop Leslie. Dante, Virgil, and Statius can be seen in the background.

Matelda, anglicized as Matilda in some translations, is a minor character in Dante Alighieri's Purgatorio, the second canticle of the Divine Comedy. She is present in the final six cantos of the canticle, but is unnamed until Canto XXXIII. While Dante makes Matelda's function as a baptizer in the Earthly Paradise clear, commentators have disagreed about what historical figure she is intended to represent, if any.

== Role in Purgatorio ==
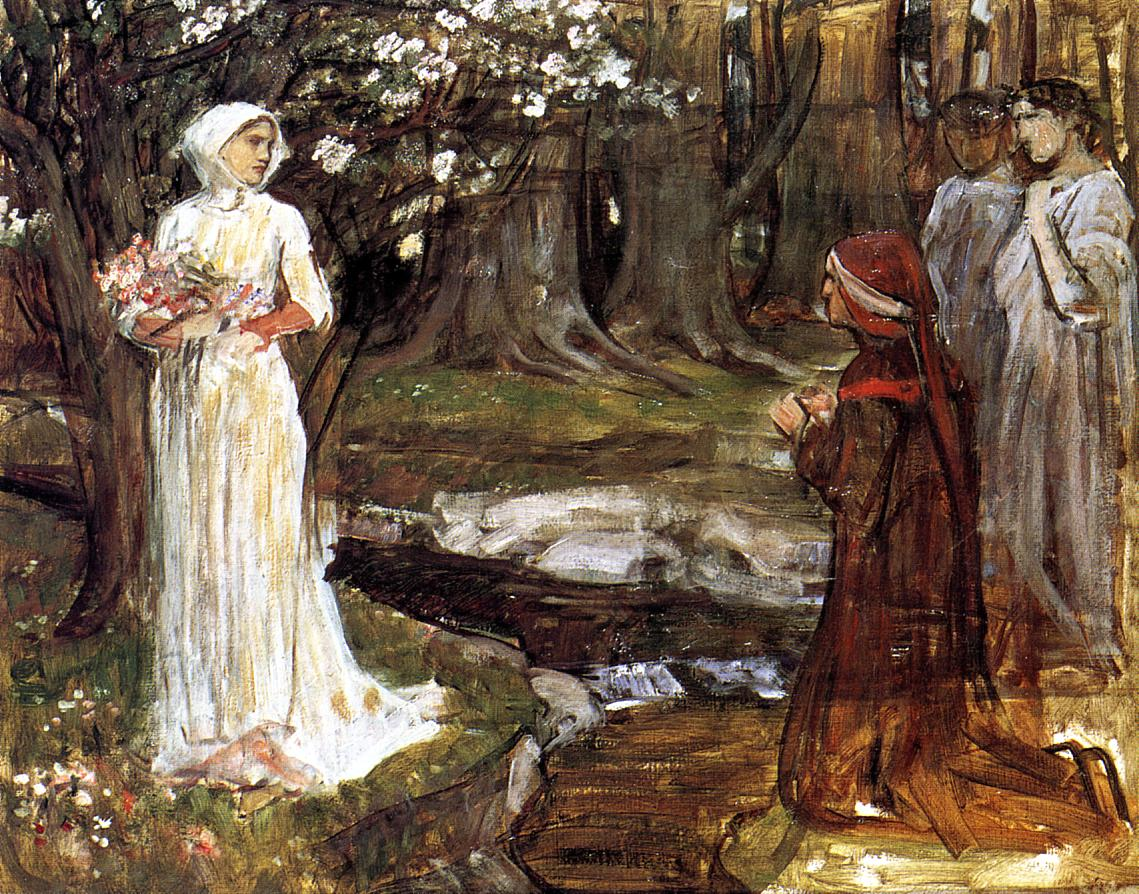
An unfinished painting that depicts Matelda, Dante, Virgil, and Statius in the Earthly Paradise, by John William Waterhouse.

Matelda first appears in Canto XXVIII of Purgatorio. As Dante begins to explore the Earthly Paradise (also known as the Garden of Eden), his movement is stopped by a stream, and he notices a woman collecting flowers and singing on its opposite bank. Taking her to be a woman in love, he asks her to come closer so that he can better hear her song, which reminds him of Proserpina before she was abducted by Hades and "lost springtime" (Purgatorio XXVIII, 48–51). Matelda approaches the water and Dante, who is stricken by her beauty and eager to get closer to her, grows angry at the river that separates them. She identifies Dante as being new to the Earthly Paradise and states that she has answers to any questions he may have. She first explains how the Earthly Paradise is unaffected by the weather on Earth, and that the weather found in the Earthly Paradise is created by the Primum Mobile, the part of Paradise closest to God. Next, she describes the water of the Earthly Paradise, which is divided into two currents: Lethe, which removes the memory of sin from all those who drink from it, and Eunoe, which brings back memories of good deeds to those who drink from it. Finally, she adds that the Earthly Paradise is the place the ancient poets dreamed about (Purgatorio XXVIII,135-144).

In Canto XXIX, Matelda walks south along the bank of the river after singing part of Psalm 32 (Psalm 31 in the Vulgate) to Dante. After the bank curves, the two head east, and Matelda, who refers to Dante as "brother," instructs him to look and listen to what lies ahead: the Church Triumphant. As Dante focuses on the seven candlesticks that lead the procession, Matelda scolds him for not looking at what lies beyond them (Purgatorio XXIX, 61–63). Dante heeds her instructions for the rest of the canto and describes the Church Triumphant in great detail.

In Canto XXX, Matelda is present during Beatrice's arrival. Her actions during the scene are not described.

Matelda, though present in the early verses of Canto XXXI, is once again not described until line 91. Dante, who had fainted due to his overwhelming feeling of remorse for his sins, wakes up to find Matelda positioned above him. She orders him to hold onto her and pulls him into Lethe. She then pushes his head under the river, and he drinks from it (Purgatorio XXXI, 94–102). Following his purification, Matelda introduces Dante to the four cardinal virtues, Beatrice's handmaidens.

In Canto XXXII, Matelda (alongside Dante and Statius) follows the chariot of the Church Triumphant on its righthand side towards a barren tree, which blooms after the chariot, pulled by a griffin, is bound to it. After Dante falls asleep to the hymn sung by the Church Triumphant, he is awoken by Matelda's voice. Matelda informs Dante that Beatrice is seated under the now-blooming tree after he asks for her whereabouts. While Matelda's actions are not described for the rest of the canto, she is present during the demonstration that Beatrice tells Dante to write down and watches as the chariot is struck by an eagle, visited by a fox (which Beatrice drives back), feathered by an eagle, damaged by a dragon, and feathered again. She continues to watch as a ten-horned figure then emerges from the chariot, followed by a harlot and a giant.

In Canto XXXIII, Matelda is part of the order arranged by Beatrice, along with Dante, Statius, and the seven virtues of the Church Triumphant. They head towards Eunoe, which Dante mistakes for the Tigris and Euphrates. After Dante asks Beatrice for the name of the water, Beatrice finally reveals Matelda's name at line 119; Matelda comments that Lethe's waters would not have caused Dante to forget that he has already been told about Eunoe (Purgatorio XXXIII,118-123). At the command of Beatrice, she submerges Dante and Statius in Eunoe, a sensation Dante claims he cannot describe because he has run out of room to write.

=== Matelda's function ===
Matelda's purpose in the Earthly Paradise is to baptize souls that have finished purging their sins in Lethe and Eunoe. Although some commentators have suggested that her role as a baptizer is specific to Dante, similar to how the blessed souls present themselves to Dante in the celestial spheres of Paradiso, she commands Statius to follow her to Eunoe in Canto XXXIII, proving that she baptizes all souls before they ascend to Paradise. Matelda has also been compared to a priestess, though the Roman Catholic Church forbids women from being ordained as priests. Commentators have also argued that Matelda, whose sole function is to serve as the purifier of souls in the Earthly Paradise, is a representation of the innocence that can only be regained through a belief in Jesus Christ.

Other commentators have noted that Matelda's earliest appearances draw similarities to the pastorella genre, though the notion of Matelda as a pastorella is quickly subverted. Dante's erotic feelings for Matelda and her presence in Canto XXVIII as a beautiful, solitary maiden in the woods have drawn comparison to Guido Cavalcanti's take on the pastorella, "In un boschetto trova' una pasturella." Despite Dante's initial depiction of Matelda, she quickly assumes the role of teacher and sister-in-Christ to Dante (the character) in Canto XXIX, where she scolds him and refers to him as frate, or "brother" (Purgatorio XXIX,15). Matelda, far from being a romantic interest for Dante, demonstrates the brotherly love found between the blessed souls of Paradise.

Matelda has also been seen as a religious counterpart to Beatrice, representing the "active life" while Beatrice represents the "contemplative life." This representation of the two women is foreshadowed by Dante in Canto XXVII, where he has Dante (the character) dream of Leah and Rachel, Matelda and Beatrice's biblical counterparts (Purgatorio XXVII, 97–108).

== Matelda's identity ==
There have been many debates surrounding what historical figure Matelda is intended to represent. Popular suggestions for who she is supposed to represent have been Countess Matilda of Tuscany, Saint Matilda, Mechtildis of Hackeborn, and Mechtildis of Magdeburg. The earliest commentators believed that Matelda is Countess Matilda, who supported Pope Gregory VII against Emperor Henry IV and donated numerous territories to the papacy before her death. More recent Dante scholars, such as Charles Hall Grandgent (whose commentary on Dante appears in contemporary editions of the Divine Comedy), also support the idea that Matelda is Countess Matilda. While Countess Matilda is the figure most frequently identified as Dante's Matelda, this selection is not without its flaws. Dante scholar Robert Hollander has identified three issues with the idea that Matelda is Countess Matilda: she supported the papacy instead of the Holy Roman Emperor, Henry IV; she is typically depicted as a soldier rather than as an attractive young woman in historical accounts; and she was a human woman, which would suggest that there was no one to baptize souls before her death in 1115, which is unlikely. Similarly, commentators have objected to Mechtildis of Hackeborn and Mechtildis of Magdeburg as options for Matelda's identity due to Matelda's association with the active life; Mechtildis of Hackeborn is a saint and Mechtildis of Magdeburg was a Christian mystic. Furthermore, Mechtildis of Hackeborn died a mere 2 years before 1300, the year the Divine Comedy takes place, leading scholars to argue that her death was too soon for her to have such a prominent role in the Earthly Paradise.

Modern scholars have also argued that Matelda represents a fictional historical figure within the Divine Comedy that cannot be connected to any actual historical person. In this interpretation of her character, Matelda was the first soul to ascend Mount Purgatory after Christ's Redemption, and is now responsible for baptizing every soul so that it can ascend to Paradise.

While many commentators have attempted to link Matelda to a specific person, others have argued that she is meant to embody a concept instead. Italian literature scholar Mark Musa has suggested that she is exclusively meant to represent the concept of the "active life" described by Dante in Canto XXVII. Because Beatrice refers to Dante to Matelda when he has a question about Eunoe in Canto XXXIII, some scholars have determined that Matelda represents Wisdom itself, a notion that can also be supported by the answers she provides Dante about the Earthly Paradise in Canto XXVIII. However, there are two problems with the idea of Matelda as a symbol: all of Dante's guides have both a historical and a symbolic identity (Virgil, for example, represents the real-life Virgil as well as the concept of Reason), and Matelda's name is not more obviously symbolic, like Malacoda in Inferno. Combining the two schools of thought on Matelda's identity, Italian scholar Victoria Kirkham has argued that Matelda historically represents Countess Matilda and spiritually represents the concept of Wisdom.
