= Hail Mary of Gold =

Roman Catholic Marian prayer

Hail Mary of Gold is a Roman Catholic Marian prayer attributed to Saint Gertrude the Great.

According to the Pieta prayer booklet, the prayer comes from Revelations of Saint Gertrude, book III, chapter XVIII. According to Saint Gertrude, the Virgin Mary stated that: "At the hour when the soul which has thus greeted me quits the body, I will appear to them in such splendid beauty that they will taste, to their great consolation, something of the joys of Paradise".

== Text ==
Hail, Mary, White Lily of the Glorious and Always-serene Trinity.
Hail, Brilliant Rose of the Garden of Heavenly Delights;
O you, by whom God wanted to be born, and by whose milk the King of Heaven wanted to be nourished!
Nourish our souls with effusions of divine grace.
Amen!

In original Latin:

Ave candidum lilium fulgidae semperque tranquillae Trinitatis,
rosaque praefulgida coelicae amoenitatis,
de qua nasci et de cuius lacte pasci Rex coelorum voluit:
divinis influxionibus animas nostras pasce.

== See also ==
- Roman Catholic Mariology
- The Glories of Mary
- Lilium candidum
