= Gertrude of Hackeborn =

13th-century German abbess

Gertrude of Hackeborn (1232–1292) was the abbess of the Benedictine convent of Helfta, near Eisleben in modern Germany.

Gertrude was born in 1232 near Halberstadt, Saxony-Anhalt. She was a member of the Thuringian Hackeborn dynasty and elder sister of Mechtilde. At a young age, she entered the Benedictine convent of Roderdorf, which followed Cistercian traditions. She was elected abbess in 1251 at the age of nineteen. She founded the convent of Hederleben in 1253 with the help of her two brothers, Albert and Louis, but it suffered from a lack of water, so she received the castle of Helpeda (Helfta) and its surrounding land from them and moved her community there in 1258.

During her time as abbess, Benedictine practice, Cistercian austerity, and Dominican and Beguine spirituality came together to make the convent of Helfta famous across the Holy Roman Empire for its practices of asceticism and mysticism. Gertrude required her nuns to be educated in the liberal arts, but most importantly in the Bible. Abbess Gertrude bought or had the nuns copy "all the good books she could get". She is described as a cultured woman of remarkable character, uniting love, gentleness, and piety with practical wisdom, and good sense. Under the leadership of the Abbess Gertrude, the monastery at Helfta was highly regarded for its spiritual and intellectual vitality. Despite the protection of some powerful families, it was pillaged at least twice during Gertrude's time.

In 1270, she tended the sick and gave shelter to Beguine Mechthild of Magdeburg.
