= Hail Mary (Terriers) =

- Terriers episode
- Episode no.: Season 1 Episode 13
- Directed by: Ted Griffin
- Written by: Ted Griffin; Nicholas Griffin
- Cinematography by: Curtis Wehr
- Editing by: David Kaldor
- Production code: 1WAD12
- Original air date: December 1, 2010
- Running time: 46 minutes

Guest appearances
- Michael Gaston as Ben Zeitlin; Karina Logue as Stephanie Dalworth; Rachel Miner as Eleanor Gosney; Elizabeth Chomko as Ashley Barrett; Alison Elliott as Laura Ross

Episode chronology
← Previous "Quid Pro Quo"	Next → —

"Hail Mary" is the thirteenth episode and series finale of the American crime comedy-drama television series Terriers. The episode was written by series creator Ted Griffin and Nicholas Griffin, and directed by Ted Griffin. It was first broadcast on FX in the United States on December 1, 2010. Five days after its airing, FX announced the series' cancellation, making the episode the series finale.

The series is set in Ocean Beach, San Diego and focuses on ex-cop and recovering alcoholic Hank Dolworth (Donal Logue) and his best friend, former criminal Britt Pollack (Michael Raymond-James), who both decide to open an unlicensed private investigation business. In the episode, Hank and Britt seek to expose Zeitlin's operations, while Hank is framed for murder.

According to Nielsen Media Research, the episode was seen by an estimated 0.784 million household viewers and gained a 0.3/1 ratings share among adults aged 18–49. The episode received critical acclaim, with critics praising the performances, writing, directing, pacing, and sense of closure. Some expressed that, despite the series eventually getting cancelled, the episode worked as a proper series finale.

== Plot ==
Britt’s (Michael Raymond-James) tech friends sweep Hank’s (Donal Logue) home and car, finding multiple listening bugs that compromised his and Laura’s (Alison Elliott) investigation. Britt learns he must serve a two-year sentence for his assault of Gavin and is warned by Maggie (Jamie Denbo) not to run away.

Hank meets Mark (Rockmond Dunbar), on suspension after Reynolds’ arrest for the rapes, and convinces Mark to help him find Laura. Britt tries to convince Katie (Laura Allen) to reconcile and flee with him, but she refuses to go after seeing the brutality of his attack. Hank and Mark learn that Laura is alive after she posts on her blog using Steph (Karina Logue) as an anonymous expert source. They find Laura as a voluntary patient at Steph’s hospital, learning that Laura’s source planned to give her a brochure for a Mexican children's hospital connected to Zeitlin (Michael Gaston). Britt meets with the recently fired Ashley (Elizabeth Chomko), who tells him that she drove Zeitlin to a meeting with Robert Lindus, Eleanor Gosney (Rachel Miner), and a fourth, unidentified man.

Hank and Mark take Laura to the police station to speak to a detective, but the police immediately arrest Hank, claiming that the Spanish-speaking suspects confessed to the shooting and identified Hank as the one who hired them to kill Jason — a story seemingly backed up by Hank’s recent credit card fraud. Hank talks with Gretchen (Kimberly Quinn) and claims his innocence; she believes him, telling him to defend himself. Expecting to be driven to jail and killed by Zeitlin’s cronies, Hank is instead released by cops loyal to Mark.

Hank, Britt, and Laura travel to Tijuana to meet with Eleanor, who tells the trio that her father Mickey had collaborated with the unidentified man at the meeting — the man pictured on the Mexican hospital brochure. Eleanor tells them that Mickey had information on the man, which he kept stored in an old jacket now in Hank’s house. Hank and Britt return to Ocean Beach and Hank sneaks into his house to retrieve the jacket. He is confronted by Mr. Burke (Daren Scott), who coldly admits to supplying Mickey with the heroin that killed him. Hank kills Burke in a brutal fight.

The next day, Hank and Britt confront Zeitlin at his boat. Holding him at gunpoint, he confesses to ordering Jason's death for the other important people he works for. He identifies the man in the Mexican hospital as Tom Cutshaw (Neal McDonough), his client and a tech mogul. They confront Cutshaw at a restaurant and Hank threatens to reveal scandalous photos Mickey had hidden, warning Cutshaw to stop the airport development or move it somewhere else. In the aftermath, Hank is exonerated and Zeitlin is arrested. Hank decides to further investigate Cutshaw, reconciles with Gretchen, and puts their home on the market again.

Britt tells Katie he is accepting responsibility for his actions and will go to prison. He asks her to destroy the paternity test, wanting to be her child's father no matter what. Hank drives Britt to prison and suggests they possibly flee to Mexico. Stopping at a red light, Hank gives him the choice: go forward and go to prison, or turn left and go to Mexico. As the light turns green, Hank asks Britt to decide.

== Reception ==
=== Viewers ===
The episode was watched by 0.784 million viewers, earning a 0.3/1 in the 18-49 rating demographics on the Nielson ratings scale. This means that 0.3 percent of all households with televisions watched the episode, while 1 percent of all households watching television at that time watched it. This was a 44% increase in viewership from the previous episode, which was watched by 0.542 million viewers with a 0.2/1 in the 18-49 rating demographics.

=== Critical reviews ===
"Hail Mary" received critical acclaim. Matt Fowler of IGN gave the episode an "amazing" 9 out of 10 rating and wrote, "Im in a sort of absolute, almost dangerous, denial about this show probably not getting picked up for a Season 2. I know there's some bold writing on the wall but I'm just not ready to say goodbye to these characters. I love the way that Hank left things with both Laura and Gretchen. Logue has been pitch-perfect in this role and has shown us just how vibrant and vital the PI genre can truly be in this day and age. There are tons of 'blue sky' shows out there that feature heroes sticking up for the swindled little guy, but this show has grounded that time-honored tale in a world of the disheveled, flawed underdog."

Noel Murray of The A.V. Club gave the episode an "A−" grade and wrote, "If nothing else, the Terriers season one finale 'Hail Mary' succeeds at doing more with the resolution of its season-long master-plot than just crossing all the Ts. It's not a perfect send-off. Some of the machinations required to keep our heroes out of jail and on the case stuck me as a little implausible, and while I don't have a problem with the 11th-hour introduction of a previously unseen villain, I felt like the big showdown between Hank and the mysterious Tom Cutshaw was too rushed and squandered both the magnificent Neal McDonough and some crackling Griffin brothers dialogue. But then came the epilogue, which was so, so satisfying. Almost painfully so." Ken Tucker of Entertainment Weekly wrote, "Terriers wrapped up its first season on Wednesday night with a highly satisfying episode and an open-ended conclusion that did not feel like a cheat or a tease. While I've made clear my reservations about the series in a previous post, I thought the last three episodes of Terriers were excellent, and am solidly in the please-FX-renew-it camp."

Alan Sepinwall of HitFix wrote, "But it wasn't just that there was room for so much plot and appearances by so many characters. It's that 'Hail Mary' was so packed with great moment after great moment, featuring that usual Terriers mix of the comic, the tragic, the thrilling and the heartbreaking." James Poniewozik of TIME wrote, "Despite its ratings, I believe there's still that chance that FX will realize it had a series too charming, well-written, and simply good to take off the air. But while there is a temptation to write strategically and pretend otherwise, honesty requires me to note that if 'Hail Mary' were Terriers' last episode ever, the series would have gone out on a fitting and remarkable note."

Matt Richenthal of TV Fanatic gave the episode a 4.8 star rating out of 5 and wrote, "We're in. We're invested. We've enjoyed a season that has played out like a well-paced movie or novel. Even if we never see Hank and Britt joke around in their truck again, the 13 hours spent watching this show over the last few months won't feel like time wasted. Far from it." Cory Barker of TV Overmind wrote, "Just know that 'Hail Mary' feels like a damn fitting ending to Terriers season one, whether it's the final episode ever or not. It's hopeful and heartfelt with just enough attitude and bite to avoid any cheese. It makes all the small moments feel like big moments. And it's a great end to one of the big introductory season of recent memory."
