= Ave Maria (1920 film) =

1920 film

- Directed by: Memmo Genua; Diana Karenne
- Written by: Gaetano Campanile-Mancini
- Cinematography: Gioacchino Gengarelli
- Production company: Tespi Film
- Distributed by: Tespi Film
- Release date: August 1920
- Country: Italy
- Languages: Silent; Italian intertitles

Ave Maria is a 1920 Italian silent film directed by Memmo Genua and Diana Karenne.

== Plot ==
The story of an aristocratic mother who, having suffered from being unable to cross class boundaries, allows her daughter to marry a poor man.

== Cast ==
- Ludovico Bendiner
- Carmen Boni
- Romano Calò
- Diana Karenne
- Nicola Pescatori
- Ernesto Treves
- Carlo Troisi - The Sword of Barbarossa(1921 film)

== Bibliography ==
- Stewart, John. Italian film: a who's who. McFarland, 1994.
