= Mary Worth (disambiguation) =

Mary Worth is an American comic strip and comic book running since 1938

Mary Worth may also refer to:

== People, figures and characters ==
- Mary Worth (folklore), an alternate name for 'Bloody Mary' from folklore, otherwise also known as 'Hell Mary'
- Mary Worth, a racehorse, winner of the 1901 Kentucky Stakes

=== Fictional characters ===
- Mary Worth, the titular character in the 1937 American comic strip Mary Worth
- Mary Worth, a character from the 1958 Italian comic book series Il Piccolo Ranger
- Mary Worth, a character from the 2008 American film The Legend of Bloody Mary
- Mary Worth, a character from the 2018 American short story The Turbulence Expert

=== Persons ===
- Ada Mary Worth (died 1912), one of the passengers of the Titanic, and mother to RMS Titanic survivor Barbara West
- Carolyn Mary Worth, Australian civilian elevated to AM at the 2015 Australia Day Honours
- Elizabeth Mary Worth, British civilian elevated to MBE at the 1984 New Year Honours
- Patricia Mary Worth (born 1946), Australian politician
- Mary Worth, actress who appeared in the 1945 American film The Falcon in San Francisco

== Other uses ==
- "Mary Worth", a 1991 song by Drunk Tank off their eponymous album Drunk Tank

== See also ==
- Mary Wroth (1587–1652), English poet and noblewoman
