= Ave María, Málaga =

Neighbourhood in Málaga, Spain

Ave María
- Neighbourhood
- Location in Spain Location in Andalusia Location in Province of Málaga
- Coordinates: 36°41′46″N 4°26′28″W
- Country: Spain
- Autonomous community: Andalusia
- Province: Province of Málaga
- Municipality: Málaga

Ave María is a neighborhood belonging to the Carretera de Cádiz district of the Andalusian city of Málaga, Spain. According to the official delimitation of the city council, it limits to the northeast with the Tabacalera neighborhood; to the southeast, with the neighborhood of Pacífico; to the south, with the neighborhood of San Andrés; to the southwest, with the Parque Mediterráneo neighborhood; and to the northwest, with the neighborhoods of Las Delicias and Girón.

== Transport ==
By bus it is connected by the following EMT lines :

Line	Journey	Route
15	La Virreina - Santa Paula	Route
16	Paseo del Parque - La Térmica	Route
