= Hell Mary Hill =

Hell Mary Hill (probably a corruption of Hail Mary Hill), is a forested hill, "tolerably high", near Sheffield, England.

According to legend, near its top is a cave reputedly containing a chest of money. The legend is described thus:

--a great iron chest, so full, that when the sun shines bright upon it, the gold can be seen through the key-hole; but it has never yet been stolen, because:

- in the first place, a huge black cat (and wherever a black cat is there is mischief, you may be sure) guards the treasure, which bristles up, and, fixing a gashful gaze on the would-be marauder, with fiery eyes, seems ready to devour him if he approach within a dozen yards of the cave;
- and, secondly, whenever this creature is off guard, (and it has occasionally been seen in a neighbouring village,) and the treasure has been attempted to be withdrawn from its tomb, no mortal rope has been able to sustain its weight, each that has been tried invariably breaking when the coffer was at the very mouth of the cave; which, being endowed with the gift of locomotion, has immediately retrograded into its pristine situation!

This tradition is coincident with the German superstition of treasure buried within the Hartz mountains, guarded, and ever disappointing the cupidity of those who would discover and possess themselves of it.
