= Monastery of Helfta =

Cistercian monastery of nuns in Saxony-Anhalt, Germany

Coordinates: 51.5084°N 11.5793°E

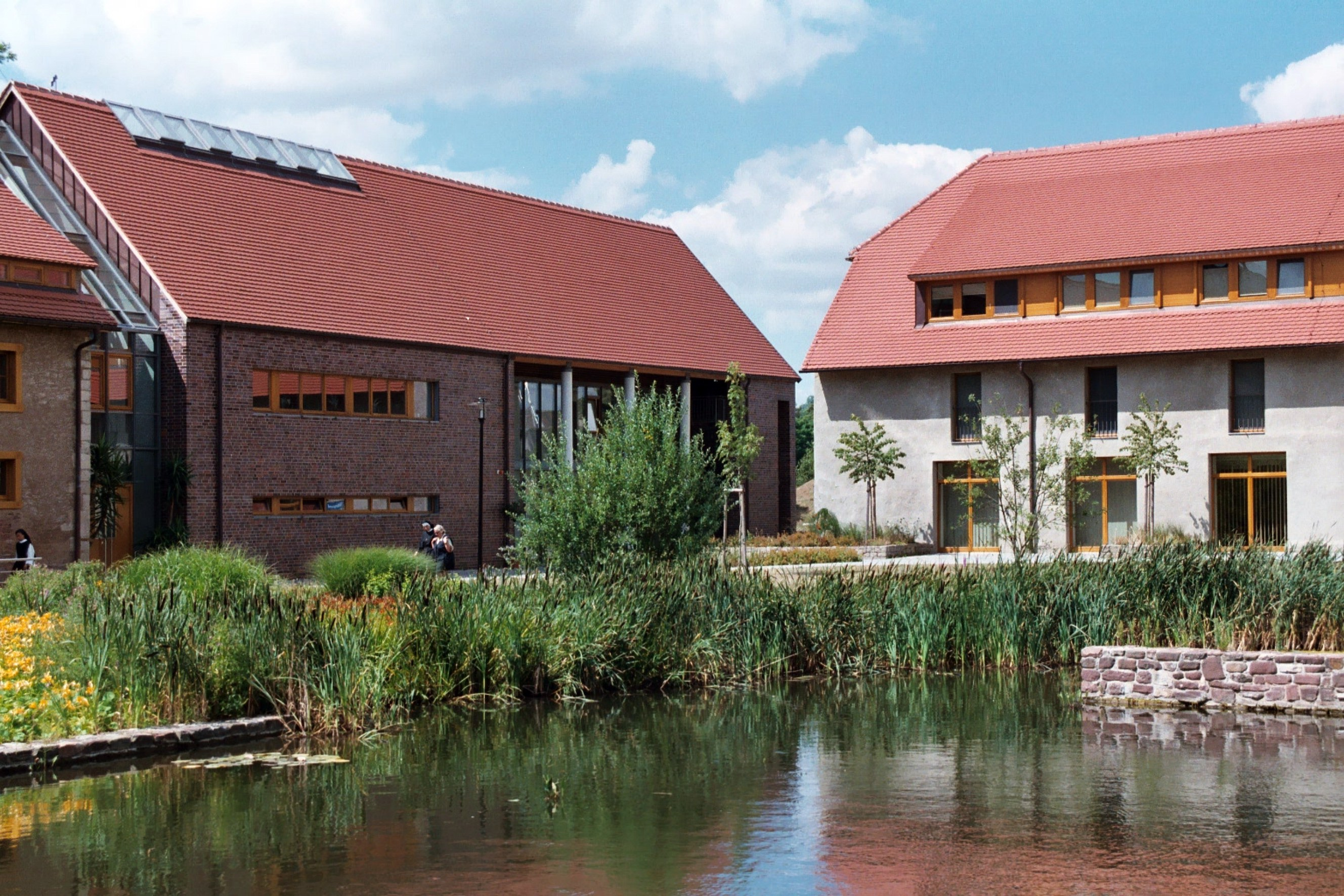
The monastic complex today

The monastery of Helfta is a Cistercian monastery of nuns in the city of Eisleben. It was originally active between 1229 and 1545, and was restored in 1999. It is dedicated to the Blessed Virgin Mary.

The original monastery was erected in 1229 by Count Burchard I of Mansfeld and Countess Elisabeth of Schwartzburg, on grounds near Mansfeld Castle and populated with the first abbess, Cunigunde of Halberstadt, and seven nuns from the Abbey of Halberstadt. In 1234, the nuns moved to Rossdorf and, in 1258, relocated a final time to Helfta, then just outside Eisleben. During the conflicts of the reign of Bishop Albert II of Halberstadt (r. 1325–1358), the monastery was devastated and the 100 nuns of the community moved to Neuhelfta, a site closer to the city walls, in 1346. The monastery was sacked in 1525 during the Peasants' War. Those nuns who remained relocated to Althelfta. When the Abbess Walburge Reuber died in 1545, the monastery was suppressed by the secular authorities. It was refounded by ten nuns from the abbey of Seligenthal in 1999. The new buildings incorporate some of the ruins of the old.

During the abbacy of Gertrude of Hackeborn (r. 1251–1292), Helfta became the foremost centre of female theology and mysticism in Germany. Mechthild of Magdeburg, Mechthild of Hackeborn and Gertrude the Great all lived and wrote there. The Eucharist and the Sacred Heart were their major themes.

== Bibliography ==
- Bynum, Caroline Walker (2010). "Helfta, convent of". In Robert E. Bjork (ed.). The Oxford Dictionary of the Middle Ages. Oxford: Oxford University Press.
- Finnegan, Mary Jeremy (1991). The Women of Helfta: Scholars and Mystics. University of Georgia Press.
- Grimes, Laura (2009). Wisdom's Friends: Gertrud of Helfta's Conversational Theology. VDM Verlag.
- Harrison, Anna (2008). "'Oh! What treasure is in this book?' Writing, Reading, and Community at the Monastery of Helfta". Viator. 39 (1): 75–106. doi:10.1484/J.VIATOR.1.100115.
- Harrison, Anna (2022). Thousands and Thousands of Lovers: Sense of Community Among the Nuns of Helfta. Cistercian Publications.
- Krieg, Martha Fessler (2000). "The 2000 Institute of Cistercian Studies Conference". Cistercian Studies Quarterly. 35 (4): 525–533.
- Neville, David O. (2000). "Divergent Interpretations of Women's Agency and Luther's Political Agenda". In Hilary Collier Sy-Quia; Susanne Baackmann (eds.). Conquering Women: Women and War in the German Cultural Imagination (PDF). University of California Press. pp. 177–198.
- Schmidt, Margot (2002). "Helfta". In André Vauchez (ed.). Encyclopedia of the Middle Ages. James Clarke & Co. pp. 659–660.
