= Gertrude the Great =

German Benedictine nun and Catholic Saint

Saint Gertrude of Helfta
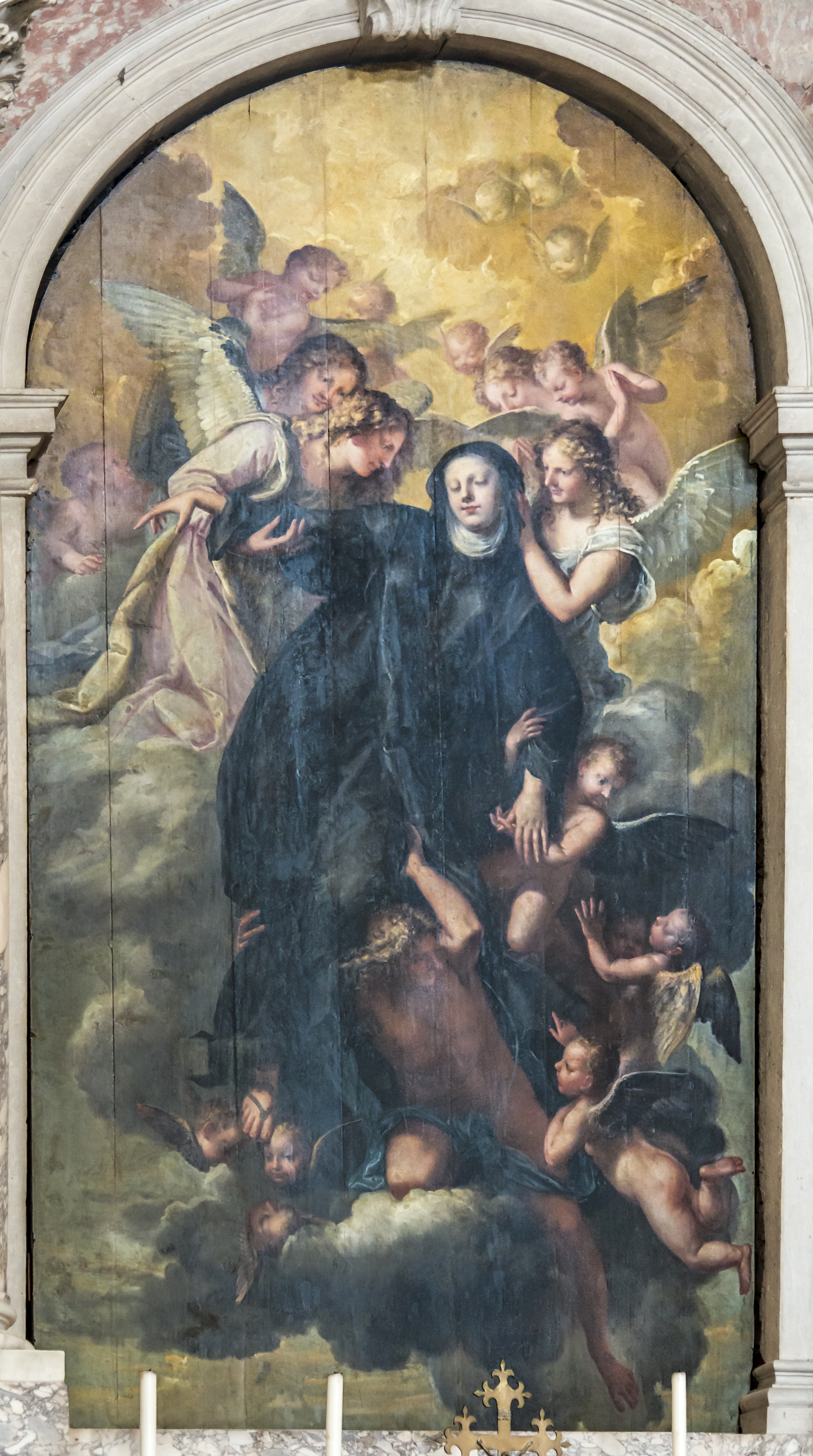
- Saint Gertrude of Helfta in ecstasy

Virgin and Abbess
- Born: January 6, 1256 allegedly Thuringia, Holy Roman Empire
- Died: c. 1302 (aged 45-46); Helfta, County of Mansfeld, Holy Roman Empire
- Venerated in: Catholic Church; The Episcopal Church
- Canonized: 1677 (equipollent) by Pope Innocent XI
- Feast: November 16 (Catholic Church); November 21 (The Episcopal Church)
- Attributes: cross, radiant heart
- Patronage: West Indies

Gertrude the Great or Gertrude of Helfta (January 6, 1256 – November 17, 1302) was a German Benedictine nun and mystic who was a member of the Monastery of Helfta. While herself a Benedictine, she had strong ties to the Cistercian Order; her monastery in Helfta is currently run by Cistercian nuns.

== Life ==
Little is known of the early life of Gertrude, who was born on the Feast of the Epiphany, January 6, 1256, allegedly in Thuringia (within the Holy Roman Empire). At age five, she entered the monastery school at St. Mary at Helfta (variously described both as Benedictine and as Cistercian), under the direction of its abbess, Gertrude of Hackeborn. It is speculated that her parents offered her as a child oblate to the church. However, given that Gertrude implies in the Herald that her parents were long dead at the time of writing, it is possible that she entered the monastery school as an orphan.

Gertrude was entrusted to the care of Mechtilde, younger sister of Abbess Gertrude, and joined the monastic community in 1266. It is clear from her writings that she received a thorough education in a range of subjects. She, and the nun who authored Books 1 and 3-5 of the Herald, are thoroughly familiar with scripture, the Church Fathers such as Augustine of Hippo and Gregory the Great, and also contemporary spiritual writers such as Richard and Hugh of St. Victor, William of St. Thierry, and Bernard of Clairvaux. Gertrude's writing demonstrates that she was well-versed in rhetoric, and her Latin is very fluent.

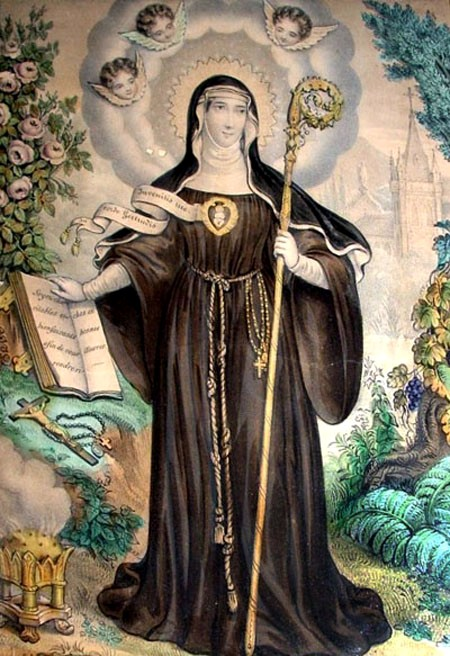
Saint Gertrude by an anonymous artist

In 1281, at age 25, she experienced the first of a series of visions which continued for the rest of her days, and which changed the course of her life. Her priorities shifted away from secular knowledge and toward studying scripture and theology. Gertrude devoted herself to personal prayer and meditation and began writing spiritual treatises. She received "invisible stigmata". Gertrude became one of the great mystics of the 13th century. Together with her friend and teacher Mechtilde, she practiced a spirituality called "nuptial mysticism" in which they came to see themselves as the Brides of Christ.

Gertrude died at Helfta, near Eisleben, around 1302.

== Works ==
Gertrude produced numerous writings, though not all have survived. Her most popular work is the Legatus Memorialis Abundantiae Divinae Pietatis (English: The Herald of Divine Love or The Herald of God's Loving-Kindness), partly written by other nuns. She also wrote a collection of Spiritual Exercises. The prayers collected under the title of Preces Gertrudianae (Gertrudian Prayers) are a later compilation, not all of them are by Gertrude. It is also likely that Gertrude authored part of the revelations of Mechthild of Hackeborn, called the Book of Special Grace.

The Herald is composed of five books. Book 2 forms the core of the work, and was written by Gertrude herself; she states that she began the work on Maundy Thursday, 1289. Books 3, 4, and 5 were written by another nun, or possibly by more than one, during Gertrude's lifetime and probably at least in part at her dictation. Book 1 was written shortly before or after Gertrude's death as an introduction to the whole collection; it is possible it was written by Gertrude's confessor, but more probably by another Helfta nun.

== Devotion to the Sacred Heart ==
Gertrude was notable for her veneration of the Sacred Heart of Jesus. Her Herald of Divine Love vividly describes her visions of Christ's heart. Such devotions were based on the belief that Christ's heart poured forth a redemptive fountain through the wound in his side. The women of Helfta made this devotion central to their mystical visions. Gertrude reported a vision on the Feast of John the Evangelist. She was resting her head near the wound in the Christ's side and hearing the beating of his heart.

== Later reputation and influence ==
After her death, only five manuscripts of Gertrude's Herald survived, the earliest one being written in 1412; only two of these manuscripts are complete. In the sixteenth century, Gertrude became prominent. Latin, Italian, and German editions of her works were published. She was especially popular in seventeenth-century France, where she was considered an antidote to Jansenism.

Her works were popular with the Discalced Carmelites in the sixteenth century. Francisco Ribera, the confessor to Teresa of Ávila, recommended that she take Gertrude as spiritual guide. At the height of Spanish female mysticism, the Spanish Jesuit Alonso de Andrade published a biography of Gertrude, giving Teresa a clear medieval antecedent. Her influence spread to European colonies in Latin America.

In the 19th century, Dom Prosper Guéranger, the restorer of Benedictine monasticism in France, was influenced by Gertrude. His Congregation of Solesmes was responsible for most of the work done on Gertrude in the nineteenth century.

== Veneration ==
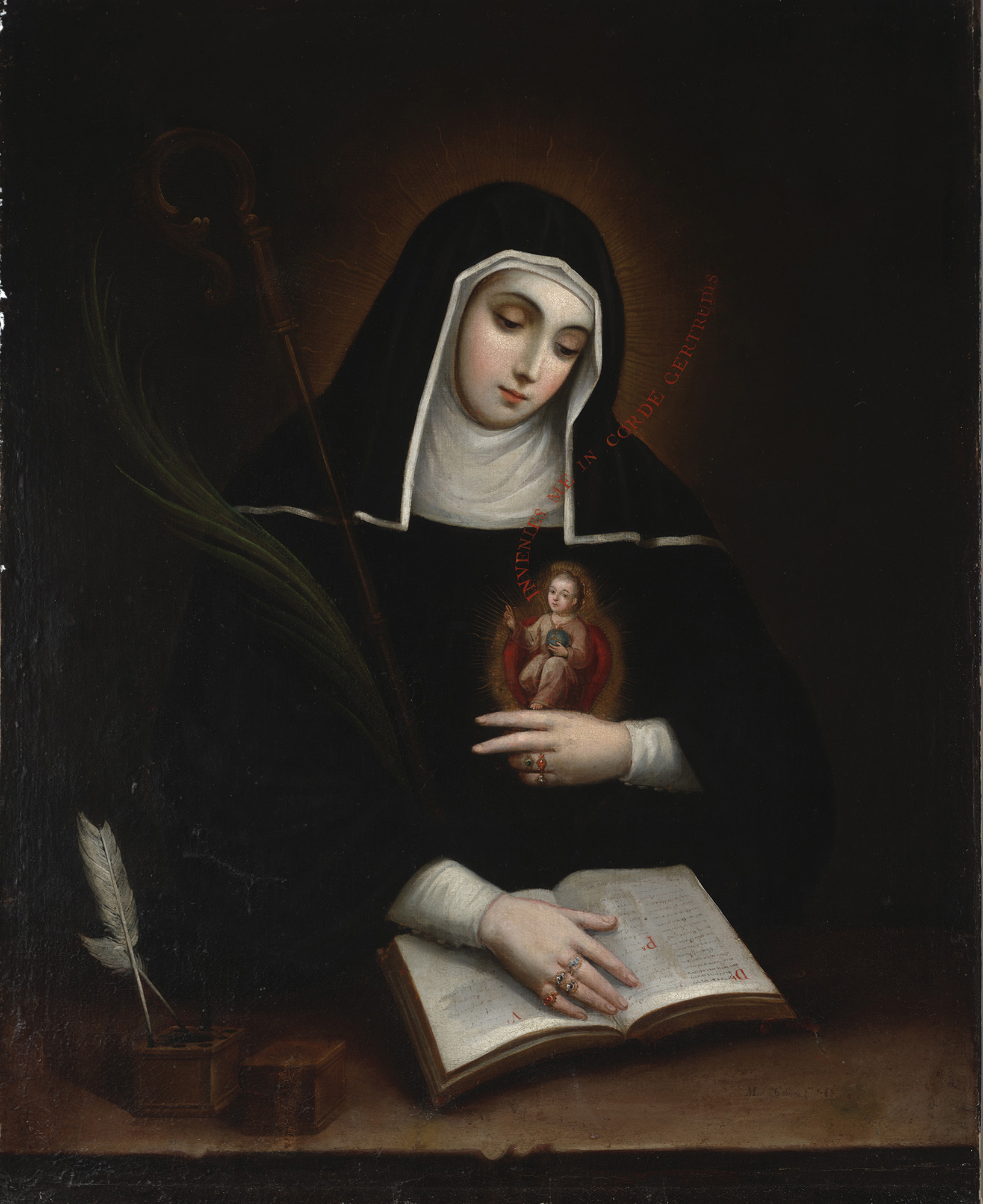
Saint Gertrude by Miguel Cabrera, 1763

Gertrude was never solemnly canonized, but a liturgical office of prayer, readings, and hymns in her honor was approved by Rome in 1606, considered the equivalent of a canonization. The feast day of Saint Gertrude was extended to the Latin Church by Pope Clement XII, originally on November 15.

On the General Roman Calendar and Roman Martyrology, the feast day for Gertrude is presently marked on November 16. On the particular national calendars of the Roman Rite for German language area and for Hungary, it is marked on November 17.

Pope Benedict XIV gave her the title "the Great" to distinguish her from Gertrude of Hackeborn and to recognize the depth of her spiritual and theological insight.

In 2022, the Episcopal Church of the United States added Gertrude, along with Mechtilde, to its calendar of saints with a feast day on November 21.

== Iconography ==
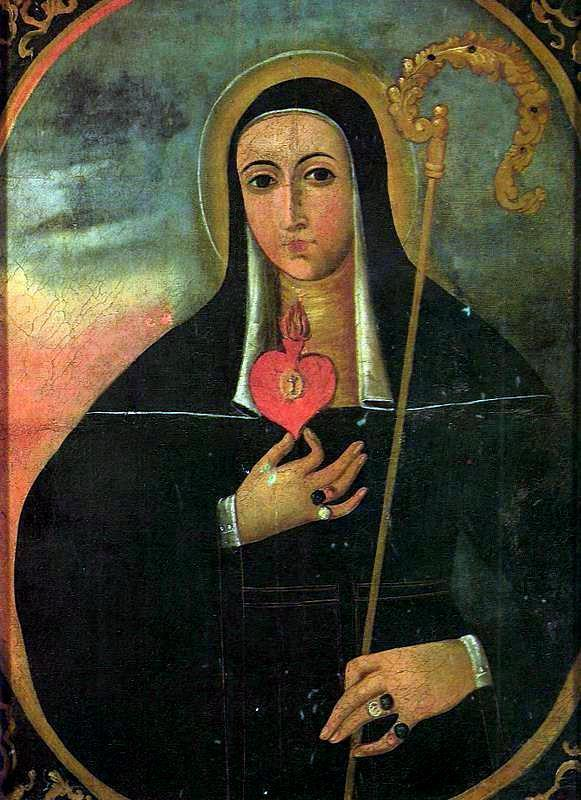
Saint Getrude by an unknown artist following Cusco School

Images of Gertrude show her clothed as a nun with the ample sleeves typical of the cowl. In the Baroque period she was depicted wearing a Benedictine habit, though this detail is not historically certain. At times she is also shown as an abbess, carrying a copy of the Rule of St. Benedict in one hand and a crosier in the other. She was not, however, an abbess. Other attributes are a cross held in hand, an image of the Sacred Heart of Jesus, and a small figure of the Child Jesus.

== Patronage ==
Numerous authors mention that in compliance with a petition from King Philip IV of Spain she was declared Patroness of the West Indies in 1609. In Peru her feast is celebrated with great festivity. In New Mexico, USA the town Santa Gertrudis de lo de Mora was built in her honor and bears her name.

== Legacy ==
- The Monastery of St. Gertrude in Cottonwood, Idaho, is home to a community of some 25 professed Benedictine nuns.
- Numerous parishes are dedicated to her all over the world.
- St. Gertrude High School is a Catholic college preparatory day school for young women in grades 9–12 in Richmond, Virginia.
- Saint Gertrude the Great Catholic School (TK-8th Grade) and Parish in Bell Gardens, California.
