= Primetime Emmy Award for Outstanding Limited or Anthology Series =

Category of Primetime Emmy Awards

- Awarded for: Outstanding Limited or Anthology Series
- Country: United States
- Presented by: Academy of Television Arts & Sciences
- First award: 1973
- Currently held by: DTF St. Louis (2026)
- Website: emmys.com

The Primetime Emmy Award for Outstanding Limited or Anthology Series represents excellence in the category of limited series that are two or more episodes, with a total running time of at least 150 minutes.

== Criteria ==
The program must tell a complete, non-recurring story, and not have an ongoing storyline or main characters in subsequent seasons.

== Background ==
The category began as the Outstanding Drama/Comedy – Limited Episodes in 1973. Prior to that year, limited series and miniseries were entered in the same category as continuing series for Outstanding Series – Drama. According to a 1972 newspaper article in the Los Angeles Times, this change might be due to the then recent entry of a number of British produced limited series that were competing with American produced continuing series in the same pre-existing category. The category was renamed Outstanding Limited Series in 1974, and later Outstanding Miniseries in 1986.

In 1991, the Outstanding Miniseries category was merged with Outstanding TV Movie, then called Outstanding Drama/Comedy Special, to form Outstanding Drama/Comedy Special and Miniseries, and the number of nominees increased from five to six. For that year, two miniseries had competed with four "made-for-television movies". The decision was reversed in 1992. In 2011, due to a low number of eligible miniseries in recent years, the categories were again merged as Primetime Emmy Award for Outstanding Miniseries or Movie, before reverting in 2014, following an influx in limited series following the critically and commercial popularity of the FX anthology series American Horror Story. A year later, the name of the awards category was changed to Outstanding Limited Series, and the rules were made to distinguish that category from that of a movie by having the work have at least two episodes, and from that of a regular series by having no more than five episodes. The 2015 rule change allowed more short-seasoned cable TV programs to compete, while prior rules had forced the same programs to compete in the same category with full seasons network programs.

What has been unique about this award in recent years (and even so today) is that there is almost always at least one nominee originating from Great Britain. For example, the 2005 winner was The Lost Prince, which happened to be that year's British entry. The 2006 winner, Elizabeth I, was also a British miniseries, although it was a co-production with American television network HBO. Likewise, the 2019 winner, Chernobyl, was a co-production of British and American companies (in this case, Sky UK and HBO).

== Milestones ==
Before the inaugurated category in 1973, The Life of Leonardo da Vinci marked the first non-English language television program to be nominated.

== Winners and nominations ==
=== 1970s ===
Year	Program	Producers	Network
Outstanding Drama/Comedy - Limited Episodes
1973 (25th)
1973 (25th)	Tom Brown's Schooldays	John McRae, producer	PBS
1973 (25th)	The Last of the Mohicans	John McRae, producer	PBS
1973 (25th)	The Life of Leonardo da Vinci	RAI Radiotelevisione Italiana	CBS
Outstanding Limited Series
1974 (26th)
1974 (26th)	Columbo (Season 3)	Dean Hargrove and Roland Kibbee, executive producers; Douglas Benton, Robert F. O'Neil, and Edward K. Dodds, producers	NBC
1974 (26th)	The Blue Knight	Lee Rich, executive producer; Walter Coblenz, producer	NBC
1974 (26th)	McCloud (Season 4)	Glen A. Larson, executive producer; Michael Gleason, producer	NBC
1975 (27th)
1975 (27th)	Benjamin Franklin	Lewis Freedman, executive producer; George Lefferts and Glenn Jordan, producers	CBS
1975 (27th)	Columbo (Season 4)	Roland Kibbee and Dean Hargrove, executive producers; Everett Chambers and Edward K. Dodds, producers	NBC
1975 (27th)	McCloud (Season 5)	Glen A. Larson, executive producer; Michael Gleason and Ron Satlof, producers	NBC
1976 (28th)
1976 (28th)	Upstairs, Downstairs (Season 4)	Rex Firkin, executive producer; John Hawkesworth, producer	PBS
1976 (28th)	The Adams Chronicles	Jac Venza, executive producer; Virginia Kassel, series producer; Paul Bogart, Robert Costello, James Cellan Jones, and Fred Coe, producers	PBS
1976 (28th)	Jennie: Lady Randolph Churchill	Stella Richman, executive producer; Andrew Brown, producer	PBS
1976 (28th)	The Law	William Sackheim, producer	NBC
1976 (28th)	Rich Man, Poor Man	Harve Bennett, executive producer; Jon Epstein, producer	ABC
1977 (29th)
1977 (29th)	Roots	David L. Wolper, executive producer; Stan Margulies, producer	ABC
1977 (29th)	The Adams Chronicles	Jac Venza, executive producer; Virginia Kassel, series producer; Robert Costello, coordinating producer; Fred Coe and James Cellan Jones, producers	PBS
1977 (29th)	Captains and the Kings	Roy Huggins, executive producer; Jo Swerling Jr., producer	NBC
1977 (29th)	Madame Bovary	Richard Beynon, producer	PBS
1977 (29th)	The Moneychangers	Ross Hunter and Jacque Mapes, producers	NBC
1978 (30th)
1978 (30th)	Holocaust	Herbert Brodkin, executive producer; Robert Berger, producer	NBC
1978 (30th)	Anna Karenina	Ken Riddington, executive producer; Joan Sullivan, series producer; Donald Wilson, producer	PBS
1978 (30th)	I, Claudius	Joan Sullivan, series producer; Martin Lisemore, producer	PBS
1978 (30th)	King	Edward S. Feldman, executive producer; Paul Maslansky, producer; Bill Finnegan, supervising producer	NBC
1978 (30th)	Washington: Behind Closed Doors	Stanley Kallis, executive producer; Eric Bercovici and David W. Rintels, supervising producers; Norman S. Powell, producer	ABC
1979 (31st)
1979 (31st)	Roots: The Next Generations	David L. Wolper, executive producer; Stan Margulies, producer	ABC
1979 (31st)	Backstairs at the White House	Ed Friendly, executive producer; Michael O'Herlihy, producer	NBC
1979 (31st)	Blind Ambition	David Susskind, executive producer; George Schaefer and Renée Valente, producers	CBS

=== 1980s ===
Year	Program	Producers	Network
Outstanding Limited Series
1980 (32nd)
1980 (32nd)	Edward & Mrs. Simpson	Andrew Brown, producer	Syndicated
1980 (32nd)	Disraeli: Portrait of a Romantic	Joan Wilson, series producer; Cecil Clarke, producer	PBS
1980 (32nd)	The Duchess of Duke Street	Joan Wilson, series producer; John Hawkesworth, producer	PBS
1980 (32nd)	The Scarlett O'Hara War	David L. Wolper, executive producer; Stan Margulies, producer	NBC
1981 (33rd)
1981 (33rd)	Shōgun	James Clavell, executive producer; Eric Bercovici, producer	NBC
1981 (33rd)	East of Eden	Mace Neufeld, executive producer; Barney Rosenzweig, producer; Ken Wales, co-producer	ABC
1981 (33rd)	Masada	George Eckstein, producer	ABC
1981 (33rd)	Rumpole of the Bailey	Joan Wilson, series producer; Jacqueline Davis, producer	PBS
1981 (33rd)	Tinker Tailor Soldier Spy	Jac Venza, executive producer; Jonathan Powell, producer; Samuel Paul, series producer	PBS
1982 (34th)
1982 (34th)	Marco Polo	Vincenzo Labella, producer	NBC
1982 (34th)	Brideshead Revisited	Jac Venza and Robert B. Kotlowitz, executive producers; Samuel Paul, series producer; Derek Granger, producer	PBS
1982 (34th)	Flickers	Joan Wilson, executive producer; Joan Brown, producer	PBS
1982 (34th)	Oppenheimer	Peter Goodchild, producer; Lindsay Law, coordinating producer	PBS
1982 (34th)	A Town Like Alice	Joan Wilson, executive producer; Henry Crawford, producer	PBS
1983 (35th)
1983 (35th)	Nicholas Nickleby	Colin Callender, producer	Syndicated
1983 (35th)	Smiley's People	Jonathan Powell, producer	Syndicated
1983 (35th)	The Thorn Birds	David L. Wolper and Edward Lewis, executive producers; Stan Margulies, producer	ABC
1983 (35th)	To Serve Them All My Days	Ken Riddington, producer	PBS
1983 (35th)	The Winds of War	Dan Curtis, producer	ABC
1984 (36th)
1984 (36th)	Concealed Enemies	Lindsay Law and David Elstein, executive producers; Peter B. Cook, producer	PBS
1984 (36th)	Chiefs	Martin Manulis, executive producer; Jerry London, supervising producer; John E. Quill, producer	CBS
1984 (36th)	George Washington	David Gerber, executive producer; Buzz Kulik, supervising producer; Richard Fielder, producer	CBS
1984 (36th)	Nancy Astor	Philip Hinchcliffe, producer	PBS
1984 (36th)	Reilly, Ace of Spies	Verity Lambert, executive producer; Chris Burt, producer	PBS
1985 (37th)
1985 (37th)	The Jewel in the Crown	Denis Forman, executive producer; Christopher Morahan, producer	PBS
1985 (37th)	Ellis Island	Gabriel Katzka and Frank Konigsberg, executive producers; Jerry London, supervising producer; Nick Gillott, producer	CBS
1985 (37th)	Robert Kennedy and His Times	Rick Rosenberg and Robert W. Christiansen, producers	CBS
1985 (37th)	Space	Richard Berg, executive producer; Martin Manulis, producer; Allan Marcil, co-producer; Jack Clements and Robert Birnbaum, coordinating producers	CBS
1985 (37th)	A Woman of Substance	Ian Warren and Tom Donald, executive producers; Diane Baker, producer	OPT
Outstanding Miniseries
1986 (38th)
1986 (38th)	Peter the Great	Lawrence Schiller, executive producer; Marvin J. Chomsky, producer; Konstantin Thoeren, line producer	NBC
1986 (38th)	Dress Gray	Francis von Zerneck, executive producer; Glenn Jordan and William Beaudine Jr., producers	NBC
1986 (38th)	The Long Hot Summer	Leonard Hill and John Thomas Lenox, executive producers; Ronald Gilbert, supervising producer; Dori Weiss, producer	NBC
1986 (38th)	Lord Mountbatten: The Last Viceroy	George Walker, executive producer; Judith de Paul, producer	PBS
1986 (38th)	On Wings of Eagles	Edgar J. Scherick, executive producer; Lynn Raynor, producer	NBC
1987 (39th)
1987 (39th)	A Year in the Life	Joshua Brand and John Falsey, executive producers; Stephen Cragg, producer	NBC
1987 (39th)	Anastasia: The Mystery of Anna	Michael Lepiner and Kenneth Kaufman, executive producers; Graham Cottle, supervising producer; Marvin J. Chomsky, producer	NBC
1987 (39th)	Nutcracker: Money, Madness and Murder	Chuck McLain and William Hanley, executive producers; William Beaudine Jr., producer	NBC
1987 (39th)	Out on a Limb	Stan Margulies, producer; Colin Higgins, co-producer	ABC
1987 (39th)	The Two Mrs. Grenvilles	Susan G. Pollock, executive producer; John Erman, supervising producer; Preston Fischer, producer	NBC
1988 (40th)
1988 (40th)	The Murder of Mary Phagan	George Stevens Jr., producer	NBC
1988 (40th)	Baby M	Ilene Amy Berg, executive producer; Gordon Freedman, producer	ABC
1988 (40th)	Billionaire Boys Club	Donald March, executive producer; Marvin J. Chomsky, supervising producer; Marcy Gross and Ann Weston, producers	NBC
1988 (40th)	Lincoln	Sheldon Pinchuk, Bill Finnegan and Patricia Finnegan, executive producers; Robert W. Christiansen and Rick Rosenberg, producers	NBC
1988 (40th)	~~Rumpole of the Bailey~~ (Note: Over a 23-day period in July and August 1988, the PBS series Rumpole of the Bailey was: initially nominated in this category; then ruled ineligible, as each episode was a standalone story rather than a component of an ongoing miniseries story, replaced by the sixth place nomination, The Bourne Identity; then reinstated in Outstanding Drama Series, with the Academy of Television Arts & Sciences (ATAS) acknowledging that it had simply given the wrong advice to the producers of the British series as to what category to submit for. As of 2024, despite this confirmed 23-day storyline, the ATAS website still shows Rumpole of the Bailey as having been nominated in the Miniseries category with no mention of The Bourne Identity, while Rumpole of the Bailey is not mentioned in the Drama Series category of the website.)	~~Jacqueline Davis, producer; Rebecca Eaton, series executive producer; Lloyd Shirley, executive producer~~	~~PBS~~
1988 (40th)	The Bourne Identity (Note: As of 2024, the en.wiki article mislabels The Bourne Identity as a "television film", but acknowledges that the four hour show was spread over two nights, qualifying it as a miniseries - as confirmed by its Emmy nomination for Outstanding Miniseries.)	Frederick Muller, producer	ABC
1989 (41st)
1989 (41st)	War and Remembrance	Dan Curtis, executive producer; Barbara Steele, producer	ABC
1989 (41st)	I Know My First Name Is Steven	Andrew Adelson, executive producer; Kim C. Friese, producer	NBC
1989 (41st)	Lonesome Dove	Suzanne de Passe and William D. Wittliff, executive producers; Robert Halmi Jr., co-executive producer; Dyson Lovell, producer; Michael Weisbarth, supervising producer	CBS
1989 (41st)	A Perfect Spy	Jonathan Powell, executive producer; Colin Rogers, producer	PBS
1989 (41st)	The Women of Brewster Place	Carole Isenberg and Oprah Winfrey, executive producers; Karen Hall, supervising producer; Patricia K. Meyer and Reuben Cannon, producers; Barbara Black, line producer	ABC

=== 1990s ===
Year	Program	Producers	Network
Outstanding Miniseries
1990 (42nd)
1990 (42nd)	Drug Wars: The Camarena Story	Michael Mann, executive producer; Richard Brams, co-executive producer; Christopher Canaan, Ann Powell, and Rose Schacht, supervising producer; Branko Lustig, producer; Mark Allan, co-producer	NBC
1990 (42nd)	Blind Faith	Susan Baerwald and Dan Wigutow, executive producers; Daniel Franklin, co-producer	NBC
1990 (42nd)	Family of Spies	Gerald W. Abrams and Jennifer Alward, executive producers; Jonathan Bernstein, producer; William Dunne, co-producer	CBS
1990 (42nd)	The Kennedys of Massachusetts	Susan G. Pollock and Edgar J. Scherick, executive producers; Michael Barnathan and Gary Hoffman, co-executive producers; Lynn Raynor, producer	ABC
1990 (42nd)	Small Sacrifices	Suzanne De Passe and Louis Rudolph, executive producers; S. Bryan Hickox, producer	ABC
Outstanding Drama/Comedy Special and Miniseries
1991 (43rd) (Note: In 1991 (Outstanding Drama/Comedy Special and Miniseries) and from 2011 to 2013 (Outstanding Miniseries or Movie), miniseries competed in a combined category.)
1991 (43rd)	Separate but Equal	Stan Margulies and George Stevens Jr., executive producers	ABC
1991 (43rd)	Decoration Day (TV movie)	Marian Rees, executive producer; Joyce Corrington, co-producer; Dick Gallegly, line producer; Anne Hopkins, producer	NBC
1991 (43rd)	The Josephine Baker Story (TV movie)	Robert Halmi and David Puttnam, executive producers; John Kemeny, producer	HBO
1991 (43rd)	Paris Trout (TV movie)	Diana Kerew, executive producer; Frank Konigsberg and Larry Sanitsky, producers	Showtime
1991 (43rd)	Sarah, Plain and Tall (TV movie)	Glenn Close and William Self, executive producers; Edwin Self, supervising producer; Glenn Jordan, producer	CBS
1991 (43rd)	Switched at Birth	Richard Heus, Lawrence Horowitz, Barry Morrow, and Michael O'Hara, executive producers; Mark Sennet, supervising producer; Ervin Zavada, producer	NBC
Outstanding Miniseries
1992 (44th)
1992 (44th)	A Woman Named Jackie	Lester Persky, executive producer; Tomlinson Dean, co-producer; Lorin Bennett Salob, producer	NBC
1992 (44th)	The Burden of Proof	Mike Robe, executive producer; Preston Fischer, supervising producer; John Perrin Flynn, producer	ABC
1992 (44th)	Cruel Doubt	Susan Baerwald, executive producer/producer; Dan Franklin, co-producer	NBC
1992 (44th)	Drug Wars: The Cocaine Cartel	Michael Mann, executive producer; Richard Brams and Gordon Greisman, co-executive producers	NBC
1992 (44th)	In a Child's Name	Helen Verno and Dan Wigutow, executive producers; Vahan Moosekian, supervising producer	CBS
1993 (45th)
1993 (45th)	Prime Suspect 2	Sally Head, executive producer; Paul Marcus, producer	PBS
1993 (45th)	Alex Haley's Queen	Bernard Sofronski and David L. Wolper, executive producers; Mark M. Wolper, producer	CBS
1993 (45th)	Family Pictures	Les Alexander and Don Enright, executive producers; Joe Broido, producer; Jennifer Miller, co-producer	ABC
1993 (45th)	The Jacksons: An American Dream	Suzanne De Passe and Stan Margulies, executive producers; Joyce Eliason, supervising producer; Jermaine Jackson and Margaret Maldonado Jackson, producer	ABC
1993 (45th)	Sinatra	Tina Sinatra, executive producer; Richard Rosenbloom, producer	CBS
1994 (46th)
1994 (46th)	Prime Suspect 3	Sally Head, executive producer; Paul Marcus, producer	PBS
1994 (46th)	Armistead Maupin's Tales of the City	Tim Bevan, Richard Kramer, Armistead Maupin, and Sigurjon Sighvatsson, executive producers; Antony Root, supervising producer; Alan Poul, producer	PBS
1994 (46th)	Oldest Living Confederate Widow Tells All	Frank Konigsberg and Larry Sanitsky, executive producers; Joyce Eliason, supervising producer; Jack Clements, producer	CBS
1994 (46th)	Stephen King's The Stand	Stephen King and Richard P. Rubinstein, executive producers; Peter McIntosh, supervising producer; Mitchell Galin, producer	ABC
1994 (46th)	World War II: When Lions Roared	Ethel Winant, executive producer; Bruce Kerner, supervising producer; David W. Rintels, producer; Victoria Riskin, co-producer	NBC
1995 (47th)
1995 (47th)	Joseph	Gerald Rafshoon, executive producer; Laura Fattori, line producer; Lorenzo Minoli, producer	TNT
1995 (47th)	Buffalo Girls	Suzanne de Passe, executive producer; Sandra Saxon Brice and Suzanne Coston, producer	CBS
1995 (47th)	Children of the Dust	Joyce Eliason and Frank Konigsberg, executive producers; Harold Tichenor, producer	CBS
1995 (47th)	Martin Chuzzlewit	Rebecca Eaton and Michael Wearing, executive producers; Chris Parr, producer	PBS
1995 (47th)	A Woman of Independent Means	Sally Field, executive producer; Preston Fischer, co-executive producer; Philip Kleinbart, supervising producer; Robert Greenwald, producer; Steve Saeta, co-producer	NBC
1996 (48th)
1996 (48th)	Gulliver's Travels	Robert Halmi Sr. and Brian Henson, executive producers; Duncan Kenworthy, producer	NBC
1996 (48th)	Andersonville	John Frankenheimer and Ethel Winant, executive producers; David W. Rintels, producer; Diane Smith, co-producer	TNT
1996 (48th)	Hiroshima	Andrew Adelson, Michael Campus, Tetsuya Ikeda, Paul Painter, and Robin Spry, executive producers; Tracey Alexander, co-executive producer; Kazutoshi Wadakura, producer	Showtime
1996 (48th)	Moses	Gerald Rafshoon, executive producer; Laura Fattori, line producer; Lorenzo Minoli, producer	TNT
1996 (48th)	Pride and Prejudice	Michael Wearing, executive producer; Sue Britwistle, producer	A&E
1997 (49th)
1997 (49th)	Prime Suspect 5: Errors of Judgement	Rebecca Eaton and Gub Neal, executive producers; Lynn Horsford, producer	PBS
1997 (49th)	In Cold Blood	Robert Halmi Sr., executive producer; Tom Rowe, producer	CBS
1997 (49th)	The Last Don	Joyce Eliason, Frank Konigsberg, and Larry Sanitsky, executive producers; Jim Davis, producer	CBS
1997 (49th)	The Odyssey	Francis Ford Coppola, Fred Fuchs, Robert Halmi Sr., and Nicholas Meyer, executive producers; Dyson Lovell, producer	NBC
1997 (49th)	Stephen King's The Shining	Stephen King, executive producer; Elliot Friedgen, supervising producer; Mark Carliner, producer	ABC
1998 (50th)
1998 (50th)	From the Earth to the Moon	Tom Hanks, executive producer; Tony To, co-executive producer; John Melfi and Graham Yost, supervising producers; Michael Bostick, Brian Grazer, and Ron Howard, producers; Erik Bork, Bruce Richmond, and Janace Tashjian, co-producers	HBO
1998 (50th)	Armistead Maupin's More Tales of the City	Tim Bevan, Suzanne Girard, and Alan Poul, executive producers; Kevin Tierney, producer	Showtime
1998 (50th)	George Wallace	Mark Carliner, executive producer; Mitch Engel and James Sbardellati, line producers; John Frankenheimer and Julian Krainin, producers; Ethel Winant, co-producer	TNT
1998 (50th)	Merlin	Robert Halmi Sr., executive producer; Dyson Lovell, producer; Chris Thompson, line producer	NBC
1998 (50th)	Moby Dick	Francis Ford Coppola, Fred Fuchs, and Robert Halmi Sr., executive producers; Steve McGlothen, Kris Noble, and Franc Roddam, producers	USA
1999 (51st)
1999 (51st)	Horatio Hornblower	Delia Fine and Vernon Lawrence, executive producers; Andrew Benson, producer	A&E
1999 (51st)	Great Expectations	Rebecca Eaton and Michael Wearing, executive producers; David Snodin, producer	PBS
1999 (51st)	Joan of Arc	Graham Flashner, Ed Gernon, and Peter Sussman, executive producers; Andrew Deane Brenda Friend, co-executive producers; Peter Bray, producer	CBS
1999 (51st)	The ’60s	Lynda Obst, executive producer; Jim Chory, line producer	NBC
1999 (51st)	The Temptations	Suzanne Coston, Suzanne de Passe, and David V. Picker, executive producers; Jay Benson, producer	NBC

=== 2000s ===
Year	Program	Producers	Network
Outstanding Miniseries
2000 (52nd)
2000 (52nd)	The Corner	Robert F. Colesberry, David Mills and David Simon, executive producers; Nina Kostroff Noble, producer	HBO
2000 (52nd)	Arabian Nights	Robert Halmi Sr. and Robert Halmi Jr., executive producers; Howard Ellis, supervising producer; Dyson Lovell, producer	ABC
2000 (52nd)	The Beach Boys: An American Family	Neil Meron, John Stamos and Craig Zadan, executive producers; Jeff Bleckner, co-executive producer; John Whitman, producer	ABC
2000 (52nd)	Jesus	Lorenzo Minoli and Judd Parkin, executive producers; Frank Konigsberg, co-executive producer; Russell Kagan and Paolo Piria, producer	CBS
2000 (52nd)	P. T. Barnum	Delia Fine, David V. Picker and Kevin Tierney, executive producers; Suzanne Girard, producer	A&E
2001 (53rd)
2001 (53rd)	Anne Frank: The Whole Story	Hans Proppe, executive producer; David Kappes, produced by	ABC
2001 (53rd)	Armistead Maupin's Further Tales of the City	Tim Bevan, Luc Chatelain, Suzanne Girard, Armistead Maupin and Alan Poul, executive producers	Showtime
2001 (53rd)	Horatio Hornblower (“Mutiny,” “Retribution”)	Michele Buck and Delia Fine, executive producers; Andrew Benson, producer	A&E
2001 (53rd)	Life with Judy Garland: Me and My Shadows	Ed Gernon, Neil Meron, Peter Sussman, and Craig Zadan, executive producer; Robert Allan Ackerman, Kirk Ellis, and Lorna Luft, co-executive producers; Philip Von Alvensleben, supervising producer; Robert L. Freedman and John Ryan, producers	ABC
2001 (53rd)	Nuremberg	Gerald Abrams, Alec Baldwin, Jon Cornick, Suzanne Girard and Peter Sussman, executive producers; Mychele Boudrias and Ian McDougall, producers	TNT
2002 (54th)
2002 (54th)	Band of Brothers	Tom Hanks and Steven Spielberg, executive producers; Stephen E. Ambrose, Gary Goetzman and Tony To, co-executive producers; Erik Bork and Erik Jendresen, supervising producers; Mary Richards, producer	HBO
2002 (54th)	Dinotopia	Robert Halmi Jr. and Robert Halmi Sr., executive producers; Howard Ellis, supervising producer; William P. Cartlidge and Dusty Symonds, produced by	ABC
2002 (54th)	The Mists of Avalon	Lisa Alexander, James Coburn and Mark M. Wolper, executive producers; Bernd Eichinger, producer; Gideon Amir, produced by	TNT
2002 (54th)	Shackleton	Francesca Barra and Delia Fine, executive producers; Emilio Nunez, supervising producer; Selwyn Roberts, producer	A&E
2003 (55th)
2003 (55th)	Taken	Leslie Bohem and Steven Spielberg, executive producers; Joe M. Aguilar, Steve Beers and Darryl Frank, co-executive producers; Richard Heus, produced by	Sci Fi
2003 (55th)	Hitler: The Rise of Evil	Ed Gernon and Peter Sussman, executive producers; Christian Duguay and Diana Kerew, co-executive producers; Ian McDougall and Phillip Von Alvensleben, supervising producers; John Ryan, producer	CBS
2003 (55th)	Napoléon	Marc Vade, executive producer; Delia Fine, executive producer for A&E; David Craig, supervising producer for A&E; Gérard Depardieu and Jean-Pierre Guérin, producers	A&E
2004 (56th)
2004 (56th)	Angels in America	Cary Brokaw and Mike Nichols, executive producers; Mike Haley, co-executive producer; Celia Costas, produced by	HBO
2004 (56th)	American Family (Season 2)	Robert Greenblatt, David Janollari, Barbara Martinez Jitner and Gregory Nava, executive producers; Eric L. Gold, co-executive producer	PBS
2004 (56th)	Horatio Hornblower (“Loyalty,” “Duty”)	Michele Buck and Delia Fine, executive producers; Emilio Nunez, supervising producer; Andrew Benson, produced by	A&E
2004 (56th)	Prime Suspect 6: The Last Witness	Rebecca Eaton and Andy Harries, executive producers; David Boulter, producer	PBS
2004 (56th)	Traffic	Colin Cotter, Ron Hutchinson and Graham King, executive producers; Stephen Hopkins, producer; Jay Benson, produced by	USA
2005 (57th)
2005 (57th)	The Lost Prince	Joanna Beresford, Rebecca Eaton, Peter Fincham and David M. Thompson, executive producers; John Chapman, producer	PBS
2005 (57th)	Elvis	Howard Braunstein, Robert Greenblatt, Michael Jaffe and David Janollari, executive producers; Thomas Becker, Ilene Kahn Power and Jorg Westerkamp, co-executive producers; Kimberly C. Anderson and Malcolm Petal, supervising producers; Judy Cairo-Simpson, produced by	CBS
2005 (57th)	Empire Falls	Paul Newman, Marc Platt, Fred Schepisi and Scott Steindorff, executive producers; William Teitler, produced by	HBO
2005 (57th)	The 4400 (Season 1)	Ira Steven Behr, René Echevarria and Maira Suro, executive producers; Scott Peters, co-executive producer; Yves Simoneau, producer; Brent Karl Clackson, produced by	USA
2006 (58th)
2006 (58th)	Elizabeth I	George S. J. Faber, Suzan Harrison, Charles Pattinson and Nigel Williams, executive producers; Barney Reisz, producer	HBO
2006 (58th)	Bleak House	Rebecca Eaton, executive producer; Nigel Stafford-Clark, produced by	PBS
2006 (58th)	Into the West	Steven Spielberg, executive producer; Justin Falvey, Darryl Frank and William Mastrosimone, co-executive producers; Kirk Ellis, supervising producer; Larry Rapaport, producer; David A. Rosemont, produced by	TNT
2006 (58th)	Sleeper Cell (Season 1)	Ethan Reiff and Cyrus Voris, executive producers; Janet Tamaro, producer; Ann Kindberg, produced by	Showtime
2007 (59th)
2007 (59th)	Broken Trail	Stanley M. Brooks, Robert Duvall and Robert Carliner, executive producers; Chad Oakes and Damian Ganczewski, producers; Walter Hill, produced by	AMC
2007 (59th)	Prime Suspect: The Final Act	Rebecca Eaton and Andy Harries, executive producers; Andrew Benson, produced by	PBS
2007 (59th)	The Starter Wife	Josann McGibbon, Sara Parriott, Jon Avnet, Stephanie Davis, Howard Klein and Gigi Levangie Grazer, executive producers; Jeff Hayes, co-executive producer; Marsha Oglesby, producer	USA
2008 (60th)
2008 (60th)	John Adams	Tom Hanks and Gary Goetzman, executive producers; Kirk Ellis and Frank Doelger, co-executive producers; David Coatsworth and Steven Shareshian, produced by	HBO
2008 (60th)	The Andromeda Strain	Ridley Scott, Tony Scott, David W. Zucker and Tom Thayer, executive producers; Mikael Salomon, co-executive producer; Clara George, produced by	A&E
2008 (60th)	Cranford	Kate Harwood and Rebecca Eaton, executive producers; Sue Birtwistle, producer	PBS
2008 (60th)	Tin Man	Robert Halmi Sr., Robert Halmi Jr., Michael O'Connor, Steven Long Mitchell and Craig W. Van Sickle, executive producers; Matthew O'Connor, producer	Sci Fi
2009 (61st)
2009 (61st)	Little Dorrit	Anne Pivcevic and Rebecca Eaton, executive producers; Lisa Osborne, producer	PBS
2009 (61st)	Generation Kill	David Simon, Ed Burns and George S. J. Faber, executive producers; Nina Kostroff Noble, co-executive producer; Andrea Calderwood, produced by	HBO

=== 2010s ===
Year	Program	Producers	Network
Outstanding Miniseries
2010 (62nd)
2010 (62nd)	The Pacific	Tom Hanks, Steven Spielberg and Gary Goetzman, executive producers; Tony To, Graham Yost, Eugene Kelly and Bruce C. McKenna, co-executive producers; Tim Van Patten, supervising producer; Cherylanne Martin, Todd London and Steven Shareshian, producers	HBO
2010 (62nd)	Return to Cranford	Kate Harwood, executive producer; Sue Birtwistle, producer	PBS
Outstanding Miniseries or Movie
2011 (63rd)
2011 (63rd)	Downton Abbey (Season 1)	Gareth Neame, Rebecca Eaton and Julian Fellowes, executive producers; Nigel Marchant, producer; Liz Trubridge, series producer	PBS
2011 (63rd)	Cinema Verite (TV movie)	Gavin Polone and Zanne Devine, executive producers; Karyn McCarthy, produced by	HBO
2011 (63rd)	The Kennedys	Jonathan Koch, Steve Michaels, Jon Cassar, Stephen Kronish, Michael Prupas, Jamie Paul Rock, Joel Surnow, David McKillop, Dirk Hoogstra, Christine Shipton and Tara Ellis, executive producers; Brian Gibson, supervising producer	Reelz
2011 (63rd)	Mildred Pierce	Christine Vachon, Pamela Koffler, John Wells, and Todd Haynes, executive producers; Ilene S. Landress, co-executive producer	HBO
2011 (63rd)	The Pillars of the Earth	David A. Rosemont, Jonas Bauer, Tim Halkin, Michael Prupas, David W. Zucker, Rola Bauer, Ridley Scott and Tony Scott, executive producers; John Ryan, produced by	Starz
2011 (63rd)	Too Big to Fail (TV movie)	Curtis Hanson, Paula Weinstein and Jeffrey Levine, executive producers; Carol Fenelon, co-executive producer; Ezra Swerdlow, produced by	HBO
2012 (64th)
2012 (64th)	Game Change (TV movie)	Tom Hanks, Gary Goetzman and Jay Roach, executive producers; Danny Strong and Steven Shareshian, co-executive producers; Amy Sayres, producer	HBO
2012 (64th)	American Horror Story (Murder House)	Ryan Murphy, Brad Falchuk and Dante Di Loreto, executive producers; Bradley Buecker, co-executive producer; Alexis Martin Woodall, producer; Chip Vucelich, produced by	FX
2012 (64th)	Hatfields & McCoys	Leslie Greif, Nancy Dubuc and Dirk Hoogstra, executive producers; Barry Berg, supervising producer; Vlad Paunescu, producer; Kevin Costner, Darrell Fetty and Herb Nanas, produced by	History
2012 (64th)	Hemingway & Gellhorn (TV movie)	Peter Kaufman, Trish Hofmann, James Gandolfini, Alexandra Ryan and Barbara Turner, executive producers; Nancy Sanders and Mark Armstrong, co-executive producers	HBO
2012 (64th)	Luther (Season 2)	Phillippa Giles, executive producer; Katie Swinden, producer	BBC America
2012 (64th)	Sherlock: A Scandal in Belgravia (TV movie)	Beryl Vertue, Steven Moffat, Mark Gatiss, Rebecca Eaton and Bethan Jones, executive producers; Sue Vertue, produced by	PBS
2013 (65th)
2013 (65th)	Behind the Candelabra (TV movie)	Jerry Weintraub, executive producer; Susan Ekins, Gregory Jacobs and Michael Polaire, producers	HBO
2013 (65th)	American Horror Story: Asylum	Ryan Murphy, Brad Falchuk, Dante Di Loreto and Tim Minear, executive producers; Jennifer Salt, James Wong, Jessica Sharzer and Bradley Buecker, co-executive producers; Alexis Martin Woodall and Chip Vucelich, producers	FX
2013 (65th)	The Bible	Mark Burnett, Roma Downey, Richard Bedser, Nancy Dubuc, Dirk Hoogstra and Julian P. Hobbs, executive producers	History
2013 (65th)	Phil Spector (TV movie)	Barry Levinson and David Mamet, executive producers; Michael Hausman, producer	HBO
2013 (65th)	Political Animals	Greg Berlanti, Sarah Caplan, Larry Marks and Laurence Mark, executive producers; Melissa Kellner Berman, co-executive producer; Michael Cedar and Speed Weed, producers	USA
2013 (65th)	Top of the Lake	Emile Sherman, Iain Canning and Jane Campion, executive producers; Philippa Campbell, producer	Sundance TV
Outstanding Miniseries
2014 (66th)
2014 (66th)	Fargo (Season 1)	Noah Hawley, Warren Littlefield and Geyer Kosinski, executive producers; John Cameron, co-executive producer; Chad Oakes, Mike Frislev and Kim Todd, producers	FX
2014 (66th)	American Horror Story: Coven	Ryan Murphy, Brad Falchuk, Dante Di Loreto, Tim Minear, Jennifer Salt and Bradley Buecker, executive producers; James Wong, Jessica Sharzer, Doug Petrie and Alfonso Gomez-Rejon, co-executive producers; Alexis Martin Woodall, producer; Joseph Incaprera, produced by	FX
2014 (66th)	Bonnie & Clyde	Craig Zadan and Neil Meron, executive producers; John Rice and Joe Batteer, co-executive producers; David A. Rosemont, produced by	Lifetime
2014 (66th)	Luther (Season 3)	Phillippa Giles, executive producer; Claire Bennett, producer	BBC America
2014 (66th)	Treme (Season 4)	David Simon, Nina Kostroff Noble, Eric Overmyer, George Pelecanos and Carolyn Strauss, executive producers; Joseph Incaprera, produced by	HBO
2014 (66th)	The White Queen	John Griffin, Colin Callender, George S. J. Faber, Charles Pattinson, Philippa Gregory, Eurydice Gysel, Jan Vrints and Polly Hill, executive producers; Gina Cronk, produced by	Starz
Outstanding Limited Series
2015 (67th)
2015 (67th)	Olive Kitteridge	Gary Goetzman, Tom Hanks, Jane Anderson and Frances McDormand, executive producers; Steven Shareshian, co-executive producer; David Coatsworth, producer	HBO
2015 (67th)	American Crime (Season 1)	John Ridley and Michael J. McDonald, executive producers; Julie Hébert, Stacy A. Littlejohn and Diana Son, co-executive producers; Keith Huff, supervising producer; Lori-Etta Taub, produced by	ABC
2015 (67th)	American Horror Story: Freak Show	Ryan Murphy, Brad Falchuk, Dante Di Loreto, Tim Minear, Jennifer Salt, James Wong and Bradley Buecker, executive producers; Jessica Sharzer, co-executive producer; Alexis Martin Woodall, producer; Robert M. Williams Jr., produced by	FX
2015 (67th)	The Honourable Woman	Greg Brenman, executive producer; Abi Bach, producer; Hugo Blick, produced by	Sundance TV
2015 (67th)	Wolf Hall	Colin Callender, John Yorke, Polly Hill and Rebecca Eaton, executive producers; Mark Pybus, producer	PBS
2016 (68th)
2016 (68th)	The People v. O. J. Simpson: American Crime Story	Ryan Murphy, Nina Jacobson, Brad Simpson, Brad Falchuk, Scott Alexander and Larry Karaszewski, executive producers; D. V. DeVincentis and Anthony Hemingway, co-executive producers; Alexis Martin Woodall and John Travolta, producers; Chip Vucelich, produced by	FX
2016 (68th)	American Crime (Season 2)	John Ridley and Michael J. McDonald, executive producers; Julie Hébert, Stacy A. Littlejohn and Diana Son, co-executive producers; Keith Huff, supervising producer; Lori-Etta Taub, produced by	ABC
2016 (68th)	Fargo (Season 2)	Noah Hawley, Warren Littlefield, John Cameron, Joel Coen and Ethan Coen, executive producers; Kim Todd, Chad Oakes, and Michael Frislev, producers	FX
2016 (68th)	The Night Manager (Season 1)	Stephen Garrett, Simon Cornwell, Stephen Cornwell, Susanne Bier, David Farr, John le Carré, Tom Hiddleston, Hugh Laurie, Alexei Boltho and William D. Johnson, executive producers; Rob Bullock, producer	AMC
2016 (68th)	Roots	Barry Jossen, Lawrence Konner, Mark Rosenthal, Will Packer, Marc Toberoff and Mark M. Wolper, executive producers; LeVar Burton and Korin D. Huggins, co-executive producers; Ann Kindberg, producer; Alissa M. Kantrow, produced by	History
2017 (69th)
2017 (69th)	Big Little Lies (Season 1)	David E. Kelley, Jean-Marc Vallée, Reese Witherspoon, Bruna Papandrea, Nicole Kidman, Per Saari, Gregg Fienberg and Nathan Ross, executive producers; Barbara A. Hall, produced by	HBO
2017 (69th)	Fargo (Season 3)	Noah Hawley, Warren Littlefield, John Cameron, Joel Coen and Ethan Coen, executive producers; Bob DeLaurentis, Matt Wolpert, Ben Nedivi and Steve Blackman, co-executive producers; Monica Beletsky and Kim Todd, supervising producers; Leslie Cowan, Chad Oakes, Mike Frislev and Regis Kimble, producers	FX
2017 (69th)	Feud: Bette and Joan	Ryan Murphy, Dede Gardner, Tim Minear and Alexis Martin Woodall, executive producers; Chip Vucelich, co-executive producer; John J. Gray, supervising producer; Jaffe Cohen, Renee Tab, Michael Zam, Jessica Lange and Susan Sarandon, producers	FX
2017 (69th)	Genius (Einstein)	Ron Howard, Brian Grazer, Francie Calfo, Gigi Pritzker, Rachel Shane, Sam Sokolow and Kenneth Biller, executive producers; Noah Pink, co-executive producer; Robert M. Williams Jr., produced by	Nat Geo
2017 (69th)	The Night Of	Steven Zaillian, Richard Price and Jane Tranter, executive producers; Garrett Basch, co-executive producer; Scott Ferguson, produced by	HBO
2018 (70th)
2018 (70th)	The Assassination of Gianni Versace: American Crime Story	Ryan Murphy, Nina Jacobson, Brad Simpson, Alexis Martin Woodall, Tom Rob Smith, Daniel Minahan, Brad Falchuk, Scott Alexander and Larry Karaszewski, executive producers; Chip Vucelich, co-executive producer / produced by; Eric Kovtun, Lou Eyrich and Eryn Krueger Mekash, producers	FX
2018 (70th)	The Alienist	Hossein Amini, E. Max Frye, Rosalie Swedlin, Steve Golin, Chris Symes, Jakob Verbruggen, Cary Joji Fukunaga and Eric Roth, executive producers; Jamie Payne, Marshall Persinger, Ben Rosenblatt, and Seth Fisher, co-executive producers	TNT
2018 (70th)	Genius: Picasso	Kenneth Biller, Brian Grazer, Ron Howard, Francie Calfo, Gigi Pritzker, Rachel Shane and Sam Sokolow, executive producers; Raf Green, Wendy Riss Gatsiounis and Noah Pink, co-executive producers; Matthew Newman, supervising producer; Kelly M. Manners, produced by	Nat Geo
2018 (70th)	Godless	Casey Silver, Steven Soderbergh and Scott Frank, executive producers; Jessica Levin, producer; Michael Malone, produced by	Netflix
2018 (70th)	Patrick Melrose	Rachael Horovitz, Michael Jackson, Adam Ackland, Benedict Cumberbatch and Helen Flint, executive producers; Stephen Smallwood, producer	Showtime
2019 (71st)
2019 (71st)	Chernobyl	Craig Mazin, Carolyn Strauss and Jane Featherstone, executive producers; Johan Renck and Chris Fry, co-executive producers; Sanne Wohlenberg, producer	HBO
2019 (71st)	Escape at Dannemora	Ben Stiller, Michael Tolkin, Brett Johnson, Michael De Luca, Bryan Zuriff, Nicholas Weinstock and William Carraro, executive producers; Adam Brightman and Lisa M. Rowe, producers	Showtime
2019 (71st)	Fosse/Verdon	Steven Levenson, Thomas Kail, Lin-Manuel Miranda, Joel Fields, George Stelzner, Sam Rockwell and Michelle Williams, executive producers; Nicole Fosse, Charlotte Stoudt and Tracey Scott Wilson, co-executive producers; Kate Sullivan and Brad Carpenter, producers; Erica Kay, produced by	FX
2019 (71st)	Sharp Objects	Marti Noxon, Jason Blum, Gillian Flynn, Amy Adams, Jean-Marc Vallée, Nathan Ross, Gregg Fienberg, Jessica Rhoades, Charles Layton, Marci Wiseman and Jeremy Gold, executive producers; Vince Calandra, co-executive producer; David Auge, produced by	HBO
2019 (71st)	When They See Us	Ava DuVernay, Jeff Skoll, Jonathan King, Jane Rosenthal, Robert De Niro, Berry Welsh and Oprah Winfrey, executive producers	Netflix

=== 2020s ===
Year	Program	Producers	Network
Outstanding Limited Series
2020 (72nd)
2020 (72nd)	Watchmen	Damon Lindelof, Tom Spezialy, Nicole Kassell, Stephen Williams and Joseph E. Iberti, executive producers; Ron Schmidt and Carly Wray, co-executive producers; Lila Byock, Nick Cuse and Christal Henry, supervising producers; Karen Wacker and John Blair, producers	HBO
2020 (72nd)	Little Fires Everywhere	Reese Witherspoon, Lauren Neustadter, Kerry Washington, Pilar Savone, Liz Tigelaar and Lynn Shelton, executive producers; Merri Howard, Nancy Won, Attica Locke, Raamla Mohamed and Amy Talkington, co-executive producers; Harris Danow, Rosa Handelman, Shannon Houston and Celeste Ng, producers	Hulu
2020 (72nd)	Mrs. America	Dahvi Waller, Stacey Sher, Coco Francini, Cate Blanchett, Anna Boden and Ryan Fleck, executive producers; Micah Schraft and James Skotchdopole, co-executive producers; Tanya Barfield and Boo Killebrew, producers	FX
2020 (72nd)	Unbelievable	Susannah Grant, Sarah Timberman, Carl Beverly, Lisa Cholodenko, Ayelet Waldman, Michael Chabon, Katie Couric, Richard Tofel, Neil Barsky, Robyn Semien and Marie, executive producers; Jennifer Schuur and Becky Mode, co-executive producers; T. Christian Miller, Ken Armstrong, Kate DiMento and Chris Leanza, producers; John Vohlers, produced by	Netflix
2020 (72nd)	Unorthodox	Anna Winger and Henning Kamm, executive producers; Alexa Karolinski, producer	Netflix
Outstanding Limited or Anthology Series
2021 (73rd)
2021 (73rd)	The Queen's Gambit	William Horberg, Allan Scott and Scott Frank, executive producers; Mick Aniceto, producer; Marcus Loges, produced by	Netflix
2021 (73rd)	I May Destroy You	Michaela Coel, Phil Clarke and Roberto Troni, executive producers; Simon Meyers and Simon Maloney, producers	HBO
2021 (73rd)	Mare of Easttown	Paul Lee, Mark Roybal, Craig Zobel, Kate Winslet, Brad Ingelsby, Gavin O'Connor and Gordon Gray, executive producers; Ron Schmidt, co-executive producer; Karen Wacker, producer	HBO
2021 (73rd)	The Underground Railroad	Barry Jenkins, Adele Romanski, Mark Ceryak, Brad Pitt, Dede Gardner, Jeremy Kleiner, Colson Whitehead, Richard Heus and Jacqueline Hoyt, executive producers; Richleigh Heagh, producer	Prime Video
2021 (73rd)	WandaVision	Kevin Feige, Louis D'Esposito, Victoria Alonso, Matt Shakman and Jac Schaeffer, executive producers; Mary Livanos and Trevor Waterson, co-executive producers; Gretchen Enders, supervising producer; Chuck Hayward, producer	Disney+
2022 (74th)
2022 (74th)	The White Lotus (Season 1)	Mike White, David Bernad and Nick Hall, executive producers; Mark Kamine, co-executive producer	HBO
2022 (74th)	Dopesick	Danny Strong, John Goldwyn, Warren Littlefield, Karen Rosenfelt, Barry Levinson, Beth Macy and Michael Keaton, executive producers; Jane Bartelme, Mandy Safavi, Eoghan O'Donnell, Jessica Mecklenburg, Ann Johnson and Graham Littlefield, co-executive producers	Hulu
2022 (74th)	The Dropout	Elizabeth Meriwether, Katherine Pope, Michael Showalter, Jordana Mollick, Rebecca Jarvis, Taylor Dunn, Victoria Thompson, Liz Heldens and Liz Hannah, executive producers; Hilton Smith, co-executive producer; Dan LeFranc, supervising producer; Amanda Seyfried, Hilary Bettis and Megan Mascena, producers	Hulu
2022 (74th)	Inventing Anna	Shonda Rhimes, Betsy Beers and Tom Verica, executive producers; Matt Byrne, Kathy Ciric, Scott Collins, Alison Eakle and Sara Fischer, co-executive producers; Abby Ajayi, supervising producer; Jess Brownell, Holden Chang and Jessica Pressler, producers	Netflix
2022 (74th)	Pam & Tommy	Megan Ellison, Sue Naegle, Ali Krug, Seth Rogen, Evan Goldberg, James Weaver, Alex McAtee, Robert Siegel, D.V. DeVincentis, Craig Gillespie, Dylan Sellers and Dave Franco, executive producers; Chip Vucelich and Sarah Gubbins, co-executive producers	Hulu
2023 (75th)
2023 (75th)	Beef (Season 1)	Lee Sung Jin, Steven Yeun, Ali Wong, Jake Schreier, Ravi Nandan and Alli Reich, executive producers; Alice Ju and Carrie Kemper, co-executive producers; Alex Russell, supervising producer; Jes Anderson, Savey Cathey, Inman Young and Alex Gayner, producers; Matthew Medlin, produced by	Netflix
2023 (75th)	Dahmer – Monster: The Jeffrey Dahmer Story	Ryan Murphy, Ian Brennan, Alexis Martin Woodall, Eric Kovtun, Evan Peters and Janet Mock, executive producers; Scott Robertson, Sara Stelwagen and Tanase Popa, co-executive producers; David McMillan, supervising producer; Todd Nenninger, Lou Eyrich, Todd Kubrak, Reilly Smith, Regis Kimble and Richard Jenkins, producers; Mathew Hart, produced by	Netflix
2023 (75th)	Daisy Jones & the Six	James Ponsoldt, Brad Mendelsohn, Will Graham, Reese Witherspoon, Lauren Neustadter, Scott Neustadter and Michael H. Weber, executive producers; Jenny Klein, Stacy Traub, Nzingha Stewart, Michael Nelson, Charmaine DeGraté, Susan Coyne and Liz Koe, co-executive producers; Harris Danow, Judalina Neira and Ashley Strumwasser, supervising producers; Josie Craven, Taylor Jenkins Reid and Amanda Kay Price, producers	Prime Video
2023 (75th)	Fleishman Is in Trouble	Taffy Brodesser-Akner, Sarah Timberman, Carl Beverly, Susannah Grant, Jonathan Dayton and Valerie Faris, executive producers; Diana Schmidt and Cindy Chupack, co-executive producers; Kate DiMento, supervising producer; Anne M. Uemura, producer	FX
2023 (75th)	Obi-Wan Kenobi	Deborah Chow, Ewan McGregor, Kathleen Kennedy, Michelle Rejwan and Joby Harold, executive producers; Thomas Hayslip and Katterli Frauenfelder, producers	Disney+
2024 (76th)
2024 (76th)	Baby Reindeer	Richard Gadd, Wim De Greef, Petra Fried, Matt Jarvis and Ed Macdonald, executive producers; Matthew Mulot, producer	Netflix
2024 (76th)	Fargo (Season 5)	Noah Hawley, Warren Littlefield, Joel Coen, Ethan Coen, Steve Stark and Kim Todd, executive producers; Thomas Bezucha, Bob DeLaurentis, April Shih and Caitlin Jackson, co-executive producers; Regis Kimble and Dana Gonzales, producers; Leslie Cowan, produced by	FX
2024 (76th)	Lessons in Chemistry	Hannah Fidell, Rosa Handelman, Susannah Grant, Natalie Sandy, Louise Shore, Jason Bateman, Michael Costigan, Brie Larson and Lee Eisenberg, executive producers; Elijah Allan-Blitz, Mfoniso Udofia, Boo Killebrew, Elissa Karasik, Bonnie Garmus and Tracey Nyberg, co-executive producers; Teagan Wall, Nicole Delaney and Dr. Shamell Bell, supervising producers	Apple TV+
2024 (76th)	Ripley	Steven Zaillian, Garrett Basch, Clayton Townsend, Guymon Casady, Benjamin Forkner, Philipp Keel, Sharon Levy and Charlie Corwin, executive producers; Ben Rosenblatt, co-executive producer; Enzo Sisti and Andrew Scott, producers	Netflix
2024 (76th)	True Detective: Night Country	Issa López, Mari Jo Winkler-Ioffreda, Jodie Foster, Barry Jenkins, Adele Romanski, Mark Ceryak, Chris Mundy, Nic Pizzolatto, Matthew McConaughey, Woody Harrelson, Steve Golin, Richard Brown, Cary Joji Fukunaga and Alan Page Arriaga, executive producers; Princess Daazhraii Johnson, Cathy Tagnak Rexford and Layla Blackman, producers; Sam Breckman, produced by	HBO
2025 (77th)
2025 (77th)	Adolescence	Mark Herbert, Emily Feller, Hannah Walters, Stephen Graham, Brad Pitt, Dede Gardner, Jeremy Kleiner, Nina Wolarsky, Jack Thorne and Philip Barantini, executive producers; Carina Sposato, Niall Shamma and Peter Balm, co-executive producers; Jo Johnson, produced by	Netflix
2025 (77th)	Black Mirror (Season 7)	Charlie Brooker, Jessica Rhoades and Annabel Jones, executive producers; Mark Kinsella, supervising producer	Netflix
2025 (77th)	Dying for Sex	Elizabeth Meriwether, Kim Rosenstock, Katherine Pope, Kathy Ciric, Hernan Lopez, Jen Sargent, Marshall Lewy, Aaron Hart, Michelle Williams, Nikki Boyer and Shannon Murphy, executive producers	FX
2025 (77th)	Monsters: The Lyle and Erik Menendez Story	Ryan Murphy, Ian Brennan, Alexis Martin Woodall, Eric Kovtun, Scott Robertson, David McMillan, Louise Shore and Javier Bardem, executive producers; Sara Stelwagen, Tanase Popa, Todd Nenninger, Lou Eyrich and Reilly Smith, co-executive producers; Todd Kubrak, supervising producer; Peggy Tachdjian and Danielle Wang, producers	Netflix
2025 (77th)	The Penguin	Lauren LeFranc, Matt Reeves, Dylan Clark, Craig Zobel, Colin Farrell, Bill Carraro and Daniel Pipski, executive producers; Vladimir Cvetko, Erika L. Johnson and Noelle Valdivia, co-executive producers; John McCutcheon, supervising producer; Nick Towne, Corina Maritescu and Claudine Farrell, producers; Dana Robin, produced by	HBO
2026 (78th)
2026 (78th)	DTF St. Louis	Jason Bateman, Michael Costigan, David Harbour, KC Wenson, Steven Conrad, Todd Black, Molly Allen, Jason Blumenthal, Steve Tisch, Bruce Terris, Jennifer Scher, Michael Nelson and James Lasdun, executive producers; Taylor Latham, co-executive producer; Christina M. Fitzgerald, producer	HBO
2026 (78th)	All Her Fault	Christine Sacani, Nigel Marchant, Gareth Neame, Joanna Strevens, Megan Gallagher, Minkie Spiro, Sarah Snook and Jennifer Gabler Rawlings, executive producers; Terry Gould, produced by	Peacock
2026 (78th)	The Beast in Me (Season 1)	Howard Gordon, Daniel Pearle, Antonio Campos, Gabe Rotter, Claire Danes, Conan O'Brien, David Kissinger, Jeff Ross, Caroline Baron and Jodie Foster, executive producers; Ali Liebegott, co-executive producer; C.A. Johnson, supervising producer; Sean Sforza, producer; Sean Fogel, produced by	Netflix
2026 (78th)	Beef (Season 2)	Lee Sung Jin, Oscar Isaac, Carey Mulligan, Cailee Spaeny, Charles Melton, Jake Schreier, Anna Ouyang Moench, Kitao Sakurai, Steven Yeun, Ali Wong, Ravi Nandan, Sam French, Alli Reich and Ethan Kuperberg, executive producers; Alex Russell, Carrie Kemper and Dana Scott, co-executive producers; Gene Hong, Sabrina Mahfouz, Joshua Gonzales, Jes Anderson and Reuben Lim, producers	Netflix
2026 (78th)	Love Story: John F. Kennedy Jr. & Carolyn Bessette	Ryan Murphy, Nina Jacobson, Brad Simpson, Connor Hines, Eric Kovtun, Nissa Diederich, Scott Robertson, Monica Levinson, Kim Rosenstock, D.V. DeVincentis and Tanase Popa, executive producers; Karl Frankenfield, Todd Kubrak, Sara Stelwagen, Todd Nenninger, Lou Eyrich and Checka Propper, co-executive producers; Juli Weiner, supervising producer; Adam Penn, producer	FX

== Programs with multiple wins ==
3 wins

- Prime Suspect

2 wins

- American Crime Story

== Producers with multiple awards ==
6 awards

- Tom Hanks

5 awards

- Gary Goetzman

4 awards

- Rebecca Eaton
- Steven Shareshian

3 awards

- Stan Margulies
- Steven Spielberg
- Tony To

2 awards

- Scott Alexander
- Erik Bork
- David Coatsworth
- Brad Falchuk
- Sally Head
- Nina Jacobson
- Larry Karaszewski
- Paul Marcus
- Ryan Murphy
- Chad Oakes
- Brad Simpson
- George Stevens Jr.
- Chip Vucelich
- David L. Wolper
- Alexis Martin Woodall
- Graham Yost

== Programs with multiple nominations ==
Totals include continuing series, but not sequels as is the case with Cranford and Return to Cranford, Roots and Roots: The Next Generations, and others.

5 nominations

- Prime Suspect

4 nominations

- American Horror Story
- Fargo

3 nominations

- Horatio Hornblower

2 nominations

- The Adams Chronicles
- American Crime
- American Crime Story
- Beef
- Columbo
- Genius
- Luther
- McCloud
- Monster

== Producers with multiple nominations ==
12 nominations

- Rebecca Eaton

8 nominations

- Robert Halmi Sr.
- Ryan Murphy

7 nominations

- Stan Margulies
- Alexis Martin Woodall

6 nominations

- Brad Falchuk
- Delia Fine
- Tom Hanks
- Frank Konigsberg

5 nominations

- Gary Goetzman
- Suzanne de Passe
- Chip Vucelich
- Joan Wilson
- David L. Wolper

4 nominations

- Andrew Benson
- Bradley Buecker
- Joyce Eliason
- Suzanne Girard
- Dante Di Loreto
- Dyson Lovell
- Tim Minear
- Chad Oakes
- Steven Spielberg
- Peter Sussman
- Jac Venza

3 nominations

- Tim Bevan
- Colin Callender
- John Cameron
- Marvin J. Chomsky
- Kirk Ellis
- George S. J. Faber
- Preston Fischer
- Michael Frislev
- Ed Gernon
- Brian Grazer
- Noah Hawley
- Richard Heus
- Polly Hill
- Dirk Hoogstra
- Ron Howard
- Glenn Jordan
- Warren Littlefield
- Neil Meron
- Lorenzo Minoli
- Nina Kostroff Noble
- Alan Poul
- Jonathan Powell
- David W. Rintels
- David A. Rosemont
- John Ryan
- Jennifer Salt
- Larry Sanitsky
- Jessica Sharzer
- David Simon
- Tony To
- Kim Todd
- Michael Wearing
- Reese Witherspoon
- Ethel Winant
- Mark M. Wolper
- James Wong
- Craig Zadan

2 nominations

- Gerald W. Abrams
- Andrew Adelson
- Scott Alexander
- Phillip Von Alvensleben
- Susan Baerwald
- Eric Bercovici
- William Beaudine Jr.
- Jay Benson
- Kenneth Biller
- Sue Birtwistle
- Erik Bork
- Richard Brams
- Andrew Brown
- Michele Buck
- Francie Calfo
- Mark Carliner
- Robert W. Christiansen
- Jack Clements
- David Coatsworth
- Fred Coe
- Ethan Coen
- Joel Coen
- Francis Ford Coppola
- Robert Costello
- Suzanne Coston
- Dan Curtis
- Edward K. Dobbs
- Nancy Dubuc
- Howard Ellis
- Laura Fattori
- Gregg Fienberg
- Bill Finnegan
- Daryl Frank
- Scott Frank
- John Frankenheimer
- Fred Fuchs
- Phillippa Giles
- Michael Gleason
- Robert Greenblatt
- Robert Halmi Jr.
- Dean Hargrove
- Andy Harries
- Kate Harwood
- John Hawkesworth
- Sally Head
- Julie Hébert
- Keith Huff
- Joseph Incaprera
- Nina Jacobson
- David Janollari
- Barry Jenkins
- James Cellan Jones
- Larry Karaszewski
- Virginia Kassel
- Diana Kerew
- Roland Kibbee
- Ann Kindberg
- Steven King
- Glen A. Larson
- Lindsay Law
- Stacy A. Littlejohn
- Jerry London
- Michael Mann
- Martin Manulis
- Paul Marcus
- Armistead Maupin
- Michael J. McDonald
- Ian McDougall
- John McRae
- Emilio Nunez
- Charles Pattinson
- Samuel Paul
- David V. Picker
- Noah Pink
- Susan G. Pollock
- Gigi Pritzker
- Michael Prupas
- Gerald Rafshoon
- Lynn Raynor
- Ken Riddington
- John Ridley
- Rick Rosenberg
- Nathan Ross
- Edgar J. Scherick
- Ridley Scott
- Tony Scott
- Rachel Shane
- Sam Sokolow
- Diana Son
- Carolyn Strauss
- George Stevens Jr.
- Joan Sullivan
- Lori-Etta Taub
- Kevin Tierney
- Jean-Marc Vallée
- Dan Wigutow
- Robert M. Williams Jr.
- Oprah Winfrey
- Graham Yost
- David W. Zucker

== Total awards by network ==
- HBO – 15
- NBC – 10
- PBS – 10
- ABC – 5
- Netflix — 4
- FX – 3
- Syndicated – 2
- A&E – 1
- AMC – 1
- CBS – 1
- Syfy – 1
- TNT – 1

== See also ==
- Primetime Emmy Award for Outstanding Television Movie
- Golden Globe Award for Best Miniseries or Television Film
- TCA Award for Outstanding Achievement in Movies, Miniseries and Specials
