= List of American Crime episodes =

American Crime is an American anthology crime drama television series created by John Ridley that premiered on ABC on March 5, 2015. On May 11, 2017, ABC cancelled the series after three seasons. During the course of the series, 29 episodes of American Crime aired over three seasons, between March 5, 2015, and April 30, 2017.

== Series overview ==
Season	Episodes	Originally released	
Season	Episodes	First released	Last released
1	11	March 5, 2015	May 14, 2015
2	10	January 6, 2016	March 9, 2016
3	8	March 12, 2017	April 30, 2017

== Episodes ==
=== Season 1 (2015) ===
No. overall	No. in season	Title	Directed by	Written by	Original release date	US viewers (millions)
1	1	"Episode One"	John Ridley	John Ridley	March 5, 2015	8.37
2	2	"Episode Two"	John Ridley	John Ridley	March 12, 2015	5.76
3	3	"Episode Three"	Gloria Muzio	John Ridley	March 19, 2015	5.54
4	4	"Episode Four"	Joshua Marston	Diana Son	March 26, 2015	5.56
5	5	"Episode Five"	Hanelle Culpepper	Ernie Pandish	April 2, 2015	4.69
6	6	"Episode Six"	Nicole Kassell	Davy Perez	April 9, 2015	4.40
7	7	"Episode Seven"	Sam Miller	Stacy A. Littlejohn	April 16, 2015	4.38
8	8	"Episode Eight"	Rachel Morrison	Julie Hébert	April 23, 2015	4.05
9	9	"Episode Nine"	Jessica Yu	Keith Huff	April 30, 2015	3.63
10	10	"Episode Ten"	Millicent Shelton	Sonay Hoffman	May 7, 2015	4.17
11	11	"Episode Eleven"	John Ridley	John Ridley	May 14, 2015	4.21

=== Season 2 (2016) ===
No. overall	No. in season	Title	Directed by	Written by	Original release date	US viewers (millions)
12	1	"Season Two: Episode One"	John Ridley	John Ridley	December 17, 2015 (online); January 6, 2016 (broadcast)	4.74
13	2	"Season Two: Episode Two"	Clement Virgo	Ernie Pandish	January 13, 2016	4.30
14	3	"Season Two: Episode Three"	Gregg Araki	Sonay Hoffman	January 20, 2016	3.77
15	4	"Season Two: Episode Four"	Julie Hébert	Kirk A. Moore	January 27, 2016	3.63
16	5	"Season Two: Episode Five"	Rachel Morrison	Davy Perez	February 3, 2016	3.79
17	6	"Season Two: Episode Six"	Jessica Yu	Stacy A. Littlejohn	February 10, 2016	3.32
18	7	"Season Two: Episode Seven"	John Ridley	John Ridley	February 17, 2016	3.18
19	8	"Season Two: Episode Eight"	Kimberly Peirce	Keith Huff	February 24, 2016	3.51
20	9	"Season Two: Episode Nine"	James Kent	Julie Hébert	March 2, 2016	3.24
21	10	"Season Two: Episode Ten"	Nicole Kassell	Diana Son	March 9, 2016	3.70

=== Season 3 (2017) ===
No. overall	No. in season	Title	Directed by	Written by	Original release date	US viewers (millions)
22	1	"Season Three: Episode One"	So Yong Kim	John Ridley	March 12, 2017	2.67
Luis Salazar, an illegal immigrant, arrives in the United States to find work. In order to stay in business, the Hesby family, owners of a large industrial farm in North Carolina, instruct their crew captains, including Isaac Castillo, to hire migrant workers. Luis is hired by a different farm, but learns that part of his wages will be withheld in order to repay the smugglers who took him across the border (one of many elements marking human trafficking). Isaac comes across a young drug addict, Coy Henson, and offers him a job on the farm. Jeanette Hesby asks her husband Carson to hire her sister Raelyn, but Carson refuses since Raelyn stole money from his father to buy drugs. Social worker Kimara Walters tries to persuade a teenage sex trafficking victim to give up his trafficker (who also happens to be his cousin), but he walks out on her. Another sex trafficking victim, Shae Reese, is taken into custody during a police sting operation, and Kimara decides to work with her to try and locate her trafficker.
23	2	"Season Three: Episode Two"	Julie Hébert	John Ridley	March 19, 2017	1.91
Against her better judgment, Kimara presses Shae to testify against her trafficker. The Hesbys learn that a fire has killed 15 of their workers and injured several dozen others. Coy struggles with the hard labor required of a picker, angering Isaac. Luis reveals to a friend that he is looking for his missing son Teo. The latter brings him to a man who reveals that Teo was fired from the farm for insubordination. Luis threatens to inform the police of the farm's labor violations and is allowed to leave. Isaac's brother and fellow captain Diego urges him to push Coy to either shape up or cut him loose. Kimara asks her brother-in-law to be the donor for her upcoming IVF treatment. Jeanette asks Laurie Ann about the fire and what she can do to help, but is rebuffed. She argues with Carson about whether or not her concern for the workers is being influenced by Raelyn's plight. A worker explains to Jeanette that the fire was likely caused by the farm's poor living conditions.
24	3	"Season Three: Episode Three"	Victoria Mahoney	Janine Salinas Schoenberg & Moisés Zamora	March 26, 2017	1.62
Carson rebuffs his wife for looking into the fire. Coy witnesses Diego forcing himself on a female picker, and Isaac angers him further by revealing that he pays Coy extra. Luis gets a job on the Hesby farm, where Teo once worked. In group therapy, Shae confesses that she wants to abort her pregnancy, while Kimara' brother-in-law decides that he can't be the donor since it would mean raising a child he isn't ready for. Shae steals a phone to take pictures, violating the rules of the shelter. Jeanette asks JD to improve living conditions in return for her help in fighting his addiction and earning Laurie Ann's trust. After getting in a scuffle for asking questions, Luis learns that Teo disappeared months ago after being dragged off by Diego. Coy, fed up with Isaac failing to protect him from his brother's abuse, insults him and is beaten half to death in response. Jeanette and JD attend a public rally addressing the plight of migrant workers.
25	4	"Season Three: Episode Four"	Steph Green	Sonay Hoffman	April 2, 2017	1.77
Luis learns from the police that Teo was murdered weeks ago, and obtains his ashes. Coy tries to leave the farm, but finds he doesn't have the money to pay off his debt to the contractor. While arranging for Shea's abortion, Kimara seeks further treatment for her infertility. Luis lies to his wife about Teo's death when she calls him. Gabrielle arrives to take a job as a nanny for Clair, while her husband Nicholas, struggling with his furniture business, is visibly uncomfortable with her presence. Shea receives permission for an abortion, but only if she undergoes an ultrasound. Diego and Isaac procure painkillers for Coy, ignoring his pleas to take them away. Nicholas and Claire argue over Gabrielle's lack of English skills, which the former sees as undesirable. Kimara learns that Shea's pregnancy is too far along for a legal abortion. Coy runs away while Luis confronts Isaac, who he realizes is Teo's murderer, and kills him. Coy subsequently overdoses on his painkillers, but is revived at the last moment by paramedics. Luis returns home to Mexico.
26	5	"Season Three: Episode Five"	Tanya Hamilton	Keith Huff	April 9, 2017	1.74
In testimony to the police, Diego explains how the farm exploits its workers. Shae finds work as a webcam girl, while Nicholas agonizes over making necessary cuts to keep his business afloat. Clair persuades Gabrielle to let her hold onto her passport, and learns that she has an estranged son. Jeanette, seeking some distance from her family, considers dissolving her marriage. Shae decides not to have her abortion at the last second, ignoring Kimara's inquires about how she'll provide. Nicholas bonds with a guest at a party over their shared opinion that white men are unfairly "burdened" by society. Kimara, who is also attending, gets a $5,000 donation from Clair, leading to an argument with her husband.
27	6	"Season Three: Episode Six"	Ramsey Nickell	Steve Harper	April 16, 2017	1.83
28	7	"Season Three: Episode Seven"	John Krokidas	Kirk A. Moore	April 23, 2017	1.81
29	8	"Season Three: Episode Eight"	Jessica Yu	Julie Hébert	April 30, 2017	2.00

== Ratings ==
American Crime : U.S. viewers per episode (millions)

Season	Episode number										
Season	1	2	3	4	5	6	7	8	9	10	11
1	8.37	5.76	5.54	5.56	4.69	4.40	4.38	4.05	3.63	4.17	4.21
2	4.74	4.30	3.77	3.63	3.79	3.32	3.18	3.51	3.24	3.70	–
3	2.67	1.91	1.62	1.77	1.74	1.83	1.81	2.00	–		

Audience measurement performed by Nielsen Media Research
