= UC: Undercover =

- Genre: Procedural drama
- Created by: Shane Salerno; Don Winslow
- Starring: Oded Fehr; Jon Seda; Vera Farmiga; Bruklin Harris; Jarrad Paul; William Forsythe
- Composers: David Arnold; John King; Roger Neill
- Country of origin: United States
- Original language: English
- No. of seasons: 1
- No. of episodes: 13

Production
- Executive producers: Danny DeVito; Shane Salerno; Don Winslow; John Landgraf; Michael Shamberg; Stacey Sher
- Producers: Regis Kimble; Erik Bork; Thomas Carter; Oded Fehr
- Production locations: Vancouver, British Columbia
- Cinematography: Tony Westman
- Editor: Les Butler
- Running time: 43 minutes
- Production companies: Jersey Television; Chasing Time Pictures; Regency Television; NBC Studios; 20th Century Fox Television

Original release
- Network: NBC
- Release: September 30, 2001 – March 23, 2002

UC: Undercover is an American procedural drama television series created by Shane Salerno and Don Winslow. The series premiered on the NBC network on September 30, 2001. The series ran for one season of 13 episodes, finishing its run on March 23, 2002. It focused on the secret lives and private demons of an elite Justice Department crime-fighting unit that confronted the United States' deadliest, most untouchable lawbreakers by going undercover to bust them.

The screenplays were either solely written or co-written by Salerno. The main title theme song was written by English composer David Arnold (composer for five James Bond films and the TV series Sherlock, among many others) who also scored the pilot episode. Salerno said the show was a "very music driven series."

== Plot ==
" To catch a criminal, you have to become one! "

— —John Keller, opening narration

The unit is headed by authoritative Frank Donovan (Oded Fehr), with undercover agents Jake Shaw (Jon Seda) and Alex Cross (Vera Farmiga), psychological profiler Monica Davis (Bruklin Harris), and young techno-wizard Cody (Jarrad Paul), who runs all of the high-tech surveillance operations.

As a federal team, the group responds to emergencies all over the country: taking down elite bank robbers, drug kingpins, domestic terrorists, spies, jewel thieves, and corrupt cops. The drama's character-driven storylines emphasize the taut, cat-and-mouse game played by the undercover agents as they attempt to infiltrate the lives of a gallery of criminals, including murderous master thief Jack "Sonny" Walker (William Forsythe) and imprisoned drug lord Carlos Cortez (Steven Bauer).

The series also explores the psychological toll undercover work takes on the agents who play this deadly game of false identities and who commit treachery as a daily profession for the greater good. The team often butts heads with Paul Bloom (Brian Markinson), their obstructive and fiercely ambitious Justice Department boss.

== Cast ==
=== Main ===
- Oded Fehr as Frank Donovan
- Jon Seda as Jake Shaw
- Vera Farmiga as Alex Cross
- Bruklin Harris as Monica Davis
- Jarrad Paul as Cody
- William Forsythe as Sonny Walker

=== Recurring ===
- Angie Everhart as Carly, Sonny Walker's girlfriend
- Steven Bauer as Carlos Cortez
- Ving Rhames as Quito Real
- James Handy as Priest
- Bill Mondy as Scott Charles
- N'Bushe Wright as Keisha
- Grant Show as John Keller
- Brian Markinson as Paul Bloom
- Gabrielle Miller as Vanessa

== Episodes ==
| No. | Title | Directed by | Written by | Original release date | Prod. code |
|---|---|---|---|---|---|
| 1 | "Life on the Wire" | Thomas Carter | Shane Salerno & Don Winslow | September 30, 2001 | 1AEZ79 |
| 2 | "Kiss Tomorrow Goodbye" | Tony Bill | Shane Salerno | October 7, 2001 | 1AEZ01 |
| 3 | "Of Fathers and Sons" | Lou Antonio | Story by : Naren Shankar & Erik Bork; Teleplay by : Shane Salerno | October 14, 2001 | 1AEZ02 |
| 4 | "Once Upon a Time...in the Hood" "Amerikaz Most Wanted" | Terrence O'Hara | Story by : Shane Salerno; Teleplay by : Shane Salerno & Don Winslow | October 21, 2001 | 1AEZ03 |
| 5 | "Honor Among Thieves" | Richard Dobbs | Story by : Shane Salerno & Nick Kendrick; Teleplay by : Stephen Adly Guirgis | October 28, 2001 | 1AEZ04 |
| 6 | "Nobody Rides for Free" | Jefery Levy | Story by : Erik Bork; Teleplay by : Shane Salerno | November 11, 2001 | 1AEZ05 |
| 7 | "City on Fire" | Jean de Segonzac | Story by : Naren Shankar & Erik Bork; Teleplay by : Naren Shankar & Erik Bork & Stephen Adly Guirgis | November 18, 2001 | 1AEZ07 |
| 8 | "The Siege" "Prison Riot" | Kenneth Fink | Story by : Naren Shankar & Erik Bork & Nick Kendrick; Teleplay by : Shane Salerno & Stephen Adly Guirgis | December 2, 2001 | 1AEZ06 |
| 9 | "Zero Option" | Michael W. Watkins | Story by : Stephen Adly Guirgis & Nick Kendrick; Teleplay by : Shane Salerno | December 9, 2001 | 1AEZ09 |
| 10 | "Hunting Armando" | Tony Bill | Naren Shankar & Erik Bork & Stephen Adly Guirgis | January 6, 2002 | 1AEZ10 |
| 11 | "Teddy C" | Jeff Woolnough | Story by : Shane Salerno; Teleplay by : Shane Salerno & Don Winslow | January 13, 2002 | 1AEZ11 |
| 12 | "Manhunt" | Joseph Patrick Finn | Story by : Jerry Nachman & Andrew Lenchewski; Teleplay by : Naren Shankar & Stephen Adly Guirgis | March 23, 2002 | 1AEZ12 |
| 13 | "The Sins of Sonny Walker" | Allan Kroeker | Shane Salerno & Naren Shankar & Nick Kendrick | March 23, 2002 | 1AEZ08 |

== Reception ==
=== Critical response ===
The New York Times called it a "fast paced, good-looking series," and Variety wrote that series lead Oded Fehr is a "commanding and interesting addition to television." Variety added that "technical credits are comparable to theatrical quality" which led the series winning awards for cinematography and sound. The show received a high 7.3 out of 10 from viewers on TV.com. However, USA Today's Robert Bianco disliked it, awarding it one star and labeling it "pretentious, incoherent and so visually hyper it borders on nauseating."

=== Awards and nominations ===
| Year | Award | Category | Recipient(s) | Result |
|---|---|---|---|---|
| 2002 | Golden Reel Awards | Best Sound Editing in Television Episodic – Effects & Foley | Mace Matiosian, Peter Austin, Rick Hinson, Craig Hunter, David Rawlinson, Guy Tsujimoto, H. Jay Levine (for "Pilot") | Nominated |
| 2002 | Golden Reel Awards | Best Sound Editing in Television Episodic – Dialogue & ADR | Peter Austin, Edmund J. Lachmann, Ruth Adelman, Jay Keiser (for "The Siege") | Nominated |
| 2002 | NAACP Image Awards | Outstanding Actor in a Drama Series | Ving Rhames | Nominated |
| 2002 | Canadian Society of Cinematographers | Best Cinematography in a TV Series | Tony Westman (for "The Siege") | Won |
