= Ethel Winant =

Vice President of CBS
- In office 1973–1975

Personal details
- Born: Ethel Wald; August 5, 1922 Worcester, Massachusetts, U.S.
- Died: November 29, 2003 (aged 81) Los Angeles, California, U.S.
- Spouse: H. M. Wynant (1951-1971; divorced)
- Children: 3
- Occupation: Executive
- Awards: Television Hall of Fame (1999)

Ethel Winant (née Wald; August 5, 1922 – November 29, 2003) was the first woman executive in television when she became the vice-president of CBS in 1973. Winant was also a casting director for various shows including The Twilight Zone and The Mary Tyler Moore Show. She was inducted into the Television Hall of Fame in 1999.

== Early life and education ==
Ethel Wald was born on August 5, 1922, in Worcester, Massachusetts. During her childhood, she grew up in Marysville, California.

She graduated from the University of California, Berkeley with a Bachelor's degree and Whittier College with a Master's degree in Theatre.

== Career ==
While in school, Winant worked behind the scenes in the Pasadena Playhouse. After graduation, she became a theatre producer in Los Angeles while working for the Lockheed Corporation as a riveter and later riveter instructor making P-38s during the Second World War. At the end of the 1940s, Winant became an assistant to the producer for Broadway plays including A Streetcar Named Desire and Death of a Salesman.

She began working in television during the 1950s as a casting director for Studio One and Playhouse 90. Throughout the 1960s and 1970s, Winant cast various CBS shows including The Twilight Zone, Hawaii Five-O, and The Mary Tyler Moore Show. She was promoted to vice-president of CBS in 1973 and became the first woman to hold an executive role in television. After working at Children's Television Workshop in the late 1970s as a producer, Winant moved to NBC to become a vice president of TV movies and miniseries. During the 1980s and 1990s, she was the producer of multiple programs including World War II: When Lions Roared and George Wallace. She convinced Ted Bergmann to cast John Ritter on Three's Company.

== Death ==
Ethel Winant died in Los Angeles on November 29, 2003, aged 81.

== Awards and honors ==
During the 1990s, Winant was nominated for the Primetime Emmy Award for Outstanding Miniseries or Movie on three occasions.

In 1999, Ethel Winant was inducted into the Television Hall of Fame.

== Personal life ==
Winant was married to actor H. M. Wynant from 1951 until their divorce in 1971. They had three children.
