= Eat, Brains, Love =

Eat Brains Love
- Film poster
- Directed by: Rodman Flender
- Written by: Mike Herro; David Strauss
- Based on: Eat, Brains, Love by Jeff Hart
- Starring: Jake Cannavale; Angelique Rivera; Sarah Yarkin; Jim Titus; Patrick Fabian
- Cinematography: Tarin Anderson
- Edited by: Josh Ethier
- Music by: Chad Fischer
- Production companies: DiGa Studios; Gunpowder & Sky; Sandman Studios
- Distributed by: Gunpowder & Sky
- Release date: 25 August 2019 (FrightFest)
- Running time: 97 minutes
- Country: United States
- Language: English

Eat Brains Love, also stylized as Eat, Brains, Love, is a 2019 American romantic comedy horror film directed by Rodman Flender. Based on the 2013 book of the same name by Jeff Hart, the film stars Jake Cannavale, Angelique Rivera, Sarah Yarkin, Jim Titus and Patrick Fabian.

== Plot ==
Two high school opposites, stoner Jake Stephens and popular cheerleader Amanda Blake, become infected with a virus that turns them into zombie-like cannibals. They travel across the country looking for a cure. Cass, a teenage telepath, and her partner Tom work for a government agency charged with hunting and killing the infected. Cass develops feelings for Jake as they track the high schoolers. Tom dies in an attack, Cass turns against her agency and joins Jake and Amanda, forming a contentious love triangle as they journey forward, still searching for a cure.

== Release ==
The film had its world premiere at the London FrightFest Film Festival on August 25, 2019, followed by a home release in the United States on February 14, 2020 through Gunpowder & Sky.

== Reception ==
Critical reception for Eat Brains Love has been positive and the movie holds a rating of 100% on Rotten Tomatoes, based on six reviews. Dread Central gave the film four stars, writing "It probably won’t win over viewers who are truly sick to death of zombie movies, but Eat, Brains, Love at least tries to stand out from the countless other zombie films released over the last few years, with a sly satirical edge thrown in for good measure. And we have to commend it for that." SciFiNow was more critical, stating that "For the most part, though, Eat, Brains, Love offers goofy gags and adolescent antics whose strongly transgressive streak is only a horror-inflected hyperbole of what might be found in any teen flick."

=== Awards ===
- Best Picture at the Screamfest Horror Film Festival (2019, won)
