= Alexis Martin Woodall =

American executive producer

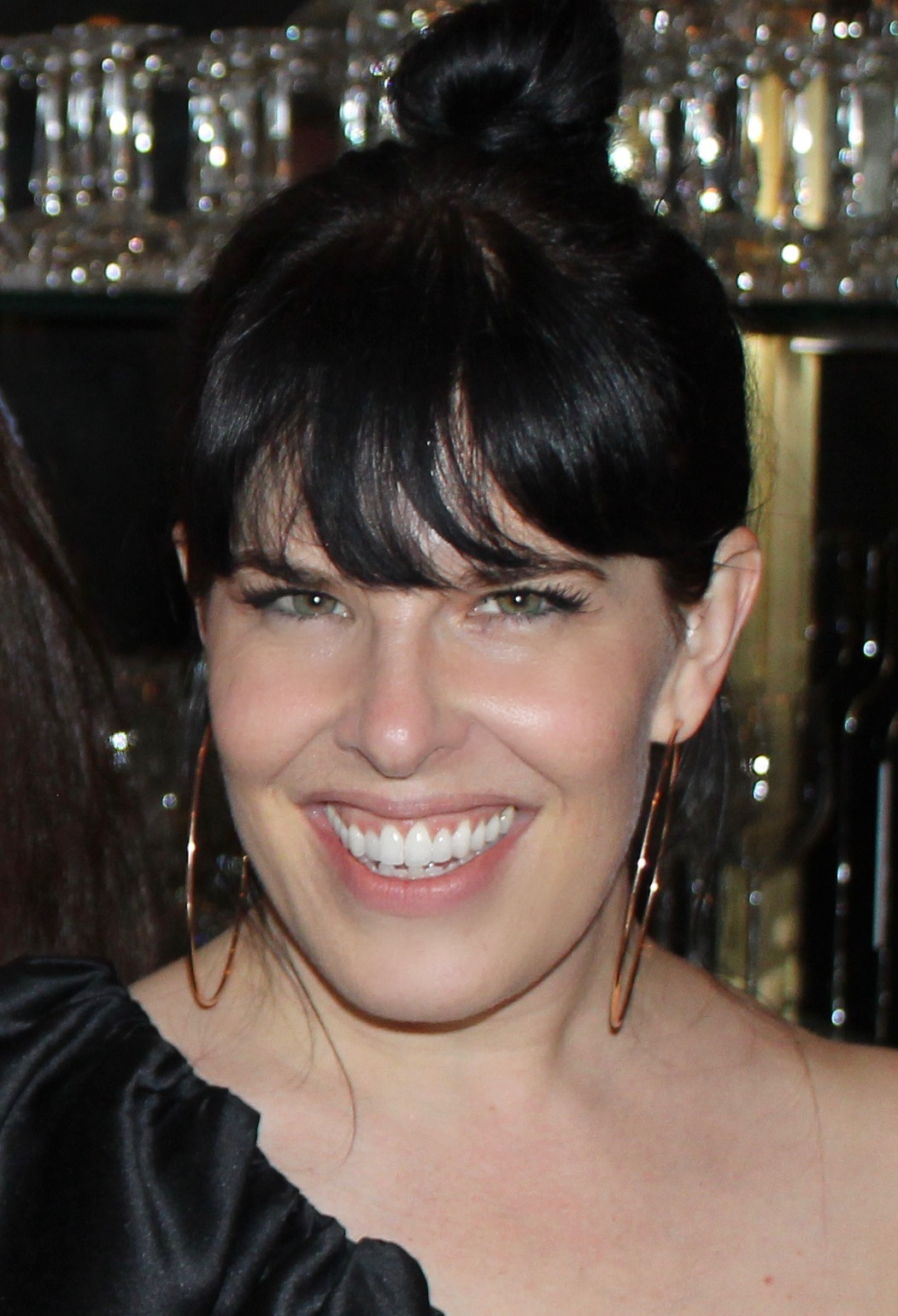
- Woodall in 2020
- Born: June 30, 1980 (age 46); Atlanta, Georgia, U.S.
- Education: BFA, Film Production, 2002, University of Colorado Boulder
- Occupations: Producer, Executive Producer, President of Ryan Murphy Productions
- Years active: 2003–present
- Spouse: David Woodall (m. 2006)
- Awards: Primetime Emmy Award for Outstanding Limited Series; Primetime Emmy Award for Outstanding Television Movie; Golden Globe Award for Best Miniseries or Television Film

Alexis Martin Woodall (born June 30, 1980) is an American producer, executive producer and the president of Ryan Murphy Productions. Woodall has won three Primetime Emmy Awards for her producing work on The Normal Heart, American Crime Story: The People V. O.J. Simpson and American Crime Story: The Assassination of Gianni Versace. She has also won two Golden Globe Awards for executive producing The People V. O.J. Simpson and The Assassination of Gianni Versace.

== Early life and education ==
Woodall was born and raised in Atlanta, Georgia. She moved to Aurora, Colorado at nine years old and graduated from Cherry Creek High School. She attended the University of Colorado Boulder for her Bachelor of Arts in film studies and Bachelor of Fine Arts in film production.

== Career ==
After graduating from the University of Colorado Boulder, Woodall moved to Los Angeles and was hired as a post-production assistant on Ryan Murphy's show Nip/Tuck. She was soon promoted to associate producer and eventually producer in Nip/Tuck's final season. After Nip/Tuck concluded, Woodall continued working with Murphy as a producer on his new television series Glee, American Horror Story, and The New Normal, as well as his film The Normal Heart. In 2015, Woodall was promoted to executive producer and has served in that capacity on Scream Queens, Feud, Pose, American Horror Story, American Crime Story, 9-1-1, its spinoff series 9-1-1: Lone Star, as well as The Politician, Hollywood, Ratched, and the upcoming Halston and Monster: The Jeffrey Dahmer Story. She also served as executive producer on the documentary A Secret Love and as producer on upcoming film adaptation of the Broadway musical The Prom. Woodall will executive produce the upcoming legal drama series, All's Fair, created by Murphy.

Woodall has won three Emmys for her work on The Normal Heart, American Crime Story: The People V. O.J. Simpson and American Crime Story: The Assassination of Gianni Versace, with a total of twelve nominations including Pose, Feud: Bette and Joan, American Horror Story and Glee. Additionally, Woodall has garnered six Golden Globe nominations for The Politician, Feud, American Horror Story, The Normal Heart, The People V. O.J. Simpson and The Assassination of Gianni Versace, the latter two of which won in 2017 and 2019, respectively.

== Personal life ==
Woodall and her husband Dave ran the restaurant Red Herring in Los Angeles, but it became one of the many restaurants closed during the height of the pandemic in 2020. She also plays the keyboard, tambourine, and used to sing back-up vocals in an indie band called Kissing Cousins.
