= Stop Kiss =

1998 play by Diana Son

Stop Kiss is a play written by the American playwright Diana Son, and produced Off-Broadway in 1998 at The Public Theater in New York City. It was directed by Jo Bonney, stage managed by Buzz Cohen, with set design by Narelle Sissons, costumes by Kaye Voyce, lighting design by James Vermeulen, sound design and original music by David Van Tieghem. It was extended three times. It focuses on the story of Sara and Callie, who are assaulted on the street after their first kiss.

== Original cast ==
- Callie: Jessica Hecht
- Sara: Sandra Oh
- George: Kevin Carroll
- Peter: Rick Holmes
- Mrs. Winsley/Nurse: Saundra McClain
- Detective Cole: Saul Stein

== U.S. West Coast premiere ==
Upon seeing the debut of Diana Son's Stop Kiss at the Joseph Papp Public Theater in New York City, theater director Pope Freeman was captivated. Freeman won the rights to stage the play's second production, the U.S. West Coast Premiere, at the Jurkowitz Theater in Santa Barbara, California in 1999. Produced by the Santa Barbara City College Department of Theater Arts, which hires Equity guest artists, it was directed by Freeman, stage managed and sound designed by Edward Lee, with scenic and lighting design by Patricia L. Frank, and costumes by Janet Freeman.

== U.S. West Coast premiere cast ==
- Callie: Christina Eliason
- Sara: Necar Zadegan
- George: Drew Murphy
- Peter: David Stanbra
- Mrs. Winsley: Christa Ray
- Detective Cole: Theodore Michael Dolas
- Nurse: Rani Apodaca

== Plot ==
Sara and Callie are walking through New York City's West Village very late at night, when they share their first kisses. This leads to a vicious attack by an angry bystander, in which Sara is horribly injured. She falls into a coma, which becomes one of the major subjects of the play. George, Callie's good friend, tries to help with the situation, but there is little he can do. Peter, Sara's ex-boyfriend from St. Louis, comes to help nurse her back to health. Throughout Stop Kiss, relationships are explored, formed, and even ended. Diana Son elaborates on the depths of human emotion and compassion in this play.

The story is told out of chronological order: alternating scenes take place respectively before and after the assault, which is not shown onstage.

== Characters ==
=== Callie Pax ===
Lead.

Callie works as a traffic reporter in New York City, where she has lived for eleven years. Callie helps Sara learn her way around the city, and, in the process, develops strong feelings for her. When Callie and Sara are attacked, Callie sustains only minor injuries and, along with Peter, nurses Sara back to health.

=== Sara ===
Lead.

Sara, who recently moved to NYC from St. Louis to accept a teaching fellowship at an elementary school in The Bronx, looks to Callie to learn how to fit in while in the Big Apple. When Callie and Sara are attacked in the park after their first kiss, Sara is injured, and falls into a coma, where she remains for some time.

=== George ===
Supporting.

George is Callie's "friend with benefits." He works as a bartender in the city, and is jealous of Sara's relationship with Callie.

=== Peter ===
Supporting.

Peter is Sara's ex-boyfriend from St. Louis. Once he heard Sara was in the hospital, he came down to New York to see her. Peter is still in love with Sara.

=== Mrs. Winsley/The Nurse ===
Supporting.

Mrs. Winsley is a witness to the attack against Sara and Callie. She is interrogated by Detective Cole. The actress who plays this role usually also plays the part of Sara's nurse.

=== Detective Cole ===
Supporting.

Detective Cole is the detective assigned to Callie and Sara's case. He is the first to hear the story of what happened to Callie and Sara the night they were attacked.

== Publication ==
The script is published by Dramatists Play Service.
