= American Crime (TV series) =

2015 American crime drama television series

- Genre: Crime drama
- Created by: John Ridley
- Starring: Felicity Huffman; Timothy Hutton; W. Earl Brown; Richard Cabral; Caitlin Gerard; Benito Martinez; Penelope Ann Miller; Elvis Nolasco; Johnny Ortiz; Lili Taylor; Trevor Jackson; Connor Jessup; Joey Pollari; Angelique Rivera; Regina King
- Composer: Mark Isham
- Country of origin: United States
- Original languages: English; Spanish; French
- No. of seasons: 3
- No. of episodes: 29 (list of episodes)

Production
- Executive producers: John Ridley; Michael J. McDonald; Julie Hébert
- Production locations: Modesto, California; Indianapolis, Indiana; Alamance County, North Carolina
- Camera setup: Single-camera
- Running time: 43 minutes
- Production companies: #LiveLikeLisa (pilot only); The International Famous Players Radio Pictures Corporation Entertainment Company; Stearns Castle Entertainment; ABC Studios

Original release
- Network: ABC
- Release: March 5, 2015 – April 30, 2017

American Crime is an American anthology crime drama television series created by John Ridley that aired on ABC from March 5, 2015, to April 30, 2017. The first season centers on race, class, and gender politics as it follows the lives of the participants in a trial who are forever changed during the legal process.

The series follows an anthology format with each season featuring a self-contained story with new characters, often played by the same group of actors. Actors featured prominently in all three seasons include Felicity Huffman, Timothy Hutton, Richard Cabral, Benito Martinez, Lili Taylor, and Regina King; while Elvis Nolasco and Connor Jessup have starring roles in two seasons.

The series was renewed for a second season in May 2015. The second season, which premiered on-demand on December 17, 2015, and premiered on ABC on January 6, 2016, In May 2016, ABC renewed the series for a third season, which premiered on March 12, 2017. On May 11, 2017, ABC cancelled the series after three seasons.

All three seasons of American Crime received critical acclaim. In 2015, the series received ten Primetime Emmy Award nominations, including for Outstanding Limited Series, Writing for a Miniseries, Movie or a Dramatic Special (Ridley), Lead Actress in a Miniseries or Movie (Huffman), Lead Actor in a Miniseries or Movie (Hutton), Supporting Actor in a Miniseries or Movie (Cabral), and a win for Supporting Actress in a Miniseries or Movie (King). In 2016, it received four Primetime Emmy Award nominations, including another for Outstanding Limited Series, with Huffman and Taylor being both nominated for Lead Actress in a Miniseries or Movie and King receiving a second win for Supporting Actress in a Miniseries or Movie.

== Overview ==
The first season takes place in Modesto, California, where a war veteran becomes the victim of a home invasion gone wrong and the lives of four people are forever changed after each one is connected to the crime.

The second season takes place in Indianapolis, Indiana, where the co-captains of a private school's basketball team are accused of sexually assaulting a male classmate and posting photographs of the incident online.

The third season takes place in Alamance County, North Carolina, where five people struggle to survive in a place where the American Dream comes with a price.

== Cast and characters ==
=== Season 1 ===
==== Main ====
- Felicity Huffman as Barbara "Barb" Hanlon
- Timothy Hutton as Russ Skokie
- W. Earl Brown as Thomas "Tom" Carlin
- Richard Cabral as Hector Tontz
- Caitlin Gerard as Aubry Taylor
- Benito Martinez as Alonzo Gutiérrez
- Penelope Ann Miller as Eve Carlin
- Elvis Nolasco as Carter Nix
- Johnny Ortiz as Anthony "Tony" Gutiérrez

==== Recurring ====
- Regina King as Aliyah Shadeed (born Doreen Nix), Carter Nix's sister and a convert to Islam
- David Hoflin as Mark Skokie, Barb and Russ' younger son, on leave from the Army
- Gwendoline Yeo as Richelle, Mark's fiancée
- Gleendylis Inoa as Jennifer "Jenny" Gutiérrez, the sister of Tony and daughter of Alonzo Gutiérrez
- Lili Taylor as Nancy Straumberg
- Kira Pozehl as Gwendolyn "Gwen" Skokie, Matt's wife who is in a coma after being beaten during a home invasion
- Grant Merritt as Matt Skokie, Gwen's husband who was killed during a home invasion
- Bob Hess as Michael Taylor, Aubry's father
- Jennifer Savidge as Ruth Taylor, Aubry's mother
- Jesse Borrego as Oscar
- Joe Nemmers as Deputy D.A. Rick Soderbergh
- Brent Anderson as Detective Chuck Palmer
- Todd Terry as Jackson, defense attorney for Hector Tontz

=== Season 2 ===
==== Main ====
- Felicity Huffman as Leslie Graham, the private school's manipulative principal
- Timothy Hutton as Dan Sullivan, the school's basketball coach
- Lili Taylor as Anne Blaine, Taylor's mother
- Elvis Nolasco as Chris Dixon, a public school's principal
- Trevor Jackson as Kevin LaCroix, a private school student and captain of the basketball team
- Connor Jessup as Taylor Blaine, the sexual assault accuser
- Joey Pollari as Eric Tanner, the closeted gay basketball player accused of sexual assault by Taylor
- Angelique Rivera as Evy Dominguez, Taylor's girlfriend
- Regina King as Terri LaCroix, Kevin's strict mother

==== Recurring ====
- Hope Davis as Steph Sullivan, Coach Sullivan's wife
- Faran Tahir as Rhys Bashir, the chairman of the board at Leyland
- André L. Benjamin as Michael LaCroix, Kevin's father
- Emily Bergl as Lillah Tanner, Eric's mother who seems to have a hard time accepting her son's homosexuality after he is outed.
- Christopher Stanley as Charles, a businessman and Dr. Graham's boyfriend
- Brent Anderson as Curt Tanner, Eric's father. Unlike his wife he tries to make an effort to come to terms with Eric being gay.
- Stephanie Sigman as Monica Salazar, an administrator at a public school and colleague of Dixon
- Richard Cabral as Sebastian De La Torre, a white hat computer hacker
- Lynn Blackburn as Cammy Ross, a reporter for a local media outlet
- Sky Azure Van Vliet as Becca Sullivan, Coach Sullivan's daughter and a cheerleader
- Michael Seitz as Wes Baxter, a basketball player at Leyland
- Ty Doran as Peter Tanner, Eric's brother and a student at Marshall
- Taylor John Smith as Luke
- Andre Williams as LeSean Young, a basketball player at Leyland

=== Season 3 ===
==== Main ====
- Felicity Huffman as Jeanette Hesby
- Timothy Hutton as Nicholas Coates
- Lili Taylor as Clair Coates, Nicholas' wife
- Connor Jessup as Coy Henson, a young American who is addicted to drugs
- Richard Cabral as Isaac Castillo, a farm crew chief
- Benito Martinez as Luis Salazar, a father from Mexico who wants to find his missing son
- Regina King as Kimara Walters, a social worker who wants to have a baby

==== Recurring ====
- Sandra Oh as Abby Tanaka
- Cherry Jones as Laurie Ann Hesby, the matriarch of Hesby Farms
- Tim DeKay as JD Hesby, Laurie Ann's brother.
- Janel Moloney as Raelyn, Jeanette's sister, a single mother recently abandoned by her husband.
- Dallas Roberts as Carson Hesby, Jeanette's husband
- Ana Mulvoy-Ten as Shae Reese, a 17-year-old sex worker
- Mickaëlle X. Bizet as Gabrielle Durand, a Haitian woman, the nanny of the Coates' son
- Clayton Cardenas as Diego Castillo, Isaac's brother

=== Cast table ===
The following cast table only includes actors who appear in multiple seasons.

List indicators
- A green cell indicates the actor as a main cast member.
- A red cell indicates the actor as a recurring cast member.
- A light blue cell indicates the actor as a guest cast member.
- A grey cell indicates the actor does not appear in the respective season.

Portrayer	Capacity and character per season		
Portrayer	Season 1	Season 2	Season 3
Felicity Huffman	Barbara "Barb" Hanlon	Leslie Graham	Jeanette Hesby
Timothy Hutton	Russ Skokie	Dan Sullivan	Nicholas Coates
Richard Cabral	Hector Tontz	Sebastian De La Torre	Isaac Castillo
Benito Martinez	Alonzo Gutiérrez	Dominic Calderon	Luis Salazar
Elvis Nolasco	Carter Nix	Chris Dixon	
Lili Taylor	Nancy Straumberg	Anne Blaine	Clair Coates
Regina King	Aliyah Shadeed	Terri LaCroix	Kimara Walters
Connor Jessup		Taylor Blaine	Coy Henson
Brent Anderson	Detective Palmer	Curt Tanner	
Shane Jacobsen	Detective Quinn	Michael O'Brien	
Rey Herrera	Hayes	Dr. Esposito	
Joe Nemmers	Rick Soderbergh	Anderson	
Emily Bergl		Lilah Tanner	Judge

== Production ==
=== Development and casting ===
In October 2013, ABC announced it was developing a drama pilot created by John Ridley. In January 2014, ABC greenlighted the pilot, and signed a deal with Ridley to direct.

Elvis Nolasco and Caitlin Gerard were the first regular members to be cast, as announced on February 14, 2014. Later Richard Cabral, Johnny Ortiz, Benito Martinez and W. Earl Brown were cast for regular supporting roles in the pilot. In early March, Timothy Hutton was cast in a lead role as Russ, and Penelope Ann Miller signed on in a supporting role of the mother of the murdered man's wife. Soon thereafter, it was announced that Felicity Huffman was cast in the lead role of Barb Skokie, Russ' stoic ex-wife and mother of the murdered young man.

=== Filming ===
The pilot episode, along with further episodes, was filmed in Austin, Texas, which substitutes for the California city of Modesto. On May 8, 2014, ABC picked up the pilot to the series for the 2014–15 television season.

Filming for the series moved to Los Angeles, California with the third season, as the show's production was awarded a California tax credit.

== Episodes ==
Season	Episodes	Originally released	
Season	Episodes	First released	Last released
1	11	March 5, 2015	May 14, 2015
2	10	January 6, 2016	March 9, 2016
3	8	March 12, 2017	April 30, 2017

== Reception ==
=== Critical response ===
Critical response of American Crime
Season	Rotten Tomatoes	Metacritic
1	94% (48 reviews)	85 (35 reviews)
2	95% (38 reviews)	85 (26 reviews)
3	100% (31 reviews)	90 (26 reviews)

All three seasons of American Crime received widespread critical acclaim, with praise going towards the writing, directing, and the performances of its cast (particularly Felicity Huffman and Regina King). On the review aggregation website Rotten Tomatoes, the overall series holds a 96% rating. On Metacritic, which uses a weighted average, the overall series received a score of 86 out of 100.

==== Season 1 ====
On Rotten Tomatoes, the first season received a rating of 94% based on 48 reviews with an average rating of 8.3 out of 10. The site's critical consensus reads, "Raw, emotional portrayals of diverse characters in dire pain, mashed up with chilling narratives and a gutsy attitude make American Crime a must-see." On Metacritic, it garnered a score of 85 out of 100, based on 35 reviews, indicating "universal acclaim". Deadline Hollywood critic Dominic Patten said in his review: "the 11-episode limited series marks a resounding flag planting by network television and tells cable that it doesn't own poignant drama on our small screens." Critic Ed Bark praised the performance of Felicity Huffman and wrote that she would be a favorite to win at next year's Primetime Emmy Awards.

==== Season 2 ====
On Rotten Tomatoes, the second season has a 95% rating based on 38 reviews with an average score of 8.1 out of 10. The site's critical consensus reads, "American Crime's intense second season infuses a complicated, topical story with genuine emotion, and patiently allows its narrative arc to develop without sacrificing momentum." On Metacritic, it has a score of 85 out of 100 based on 26 reviews, indicating "universal acclaim".

==== Season 3 ====
The third season received more acclaim than the first two seasons. On Rotten Tomatoes, it has a 100% rating, based on 31 reviews with an average score of 9 out of 10. The site's critical consensus reads, "American Crime offers a unique anthology series filled with surprising revelations and compelling inter-connected narratives that opt for original, emotional human commentary instead of tired arguments over current events." On Metacritic, it has a score of 90 out of 100, based on 26 reviews, indicating "universal acclaim". Verne Gay of Newsday called it "Another brilliant, powerful, moving season of one of TV's best."

=== Ratings ===
Season	Timeslot (ET)	Episodes	Premiered		Ended		TV season	Rank	18–49 average	Overall viewership (including DVR)
Season	Timeslot (ET)	Episodes	Date	Viewers (in millions)	Date	Viewers (in millions)	TV season	Rank	18–49 average	Overall viewership (including DVR)
1	Thursday 10:00 p.m.	11	March 5, 2015	8.37	May 14, 2015	4.21	2014–15	#85	1.7	6.70
2	Wednesday 10:00 p.m.	10	January 6, 2016	4.74	March 9, 2016	3.70	2015–16	#73	1.6	6.03
3	Sunday 10:00 p.m.	8	March 12, 2017	2.67	April 30, 2017	2.00	2016–17	#121	N/A	3.33

=== Accolades ===
Ceremony	Category	Nominee(s)	Result	Ref.
Season 1
5th Critics' Choice Television Awards	Best Actress in a Movie or Limited Series	Felicity Huffman	Nominated	
5th Critics' Choice Television Awards	Best Limited Series	American Crime	Nominated	
5th Critics' Choice Television Awards	Best Supporting Actor in a Movie or Limited Series	Elvis Nolasco	Nominated	
67th Primetime Emmy Awards	Outstanding Casting for a Limited Series, Movie or a Special	Kim Coleman and Beth Sepko Lindsay	Nominated	
67th Primetime Emmy Awards	Outstanding Lead Actor in a Limited Series or a Movie	Timothy Hutton	Nominated	
67th Primetime Emmy Awards	Outstanding Lead Actress in a Limited Series or a Movie	Felicity Huffman	Nominated	
67th Primetime Emmy Awards	Outstanding Limited Series	American Crime	Nominated	
67th Primetime Emmy Awards	Outstanding Single-Camera Picture Editing for a Limited Series or a Movie	Luyen Vu (episode: "Episode One")	Nominated	
67th Primetime Emmy Awards	Outstanding Sound Editing for a Limited Series, Movie or a Special	Gregg Barbanell, Catherine Harper, Walter Newman, Pete Reynolds, Louie Schultz, Darleen Stoker, Bruce Tanis and Kenneth Young (episode: "Episode One")	Nominated	
67th Primetime Emmy Awards	Outstanding Sound Mixing for a Limited Series or a Movie	Ryan Davis, Ben Lowry and Rick Norman (episode: "Episode Eleven")	Nominated	
67th Primetime Emmy Awards	Outstanding Supporting Actor in a Limited Series or a Movie	Richard Cabral (episode: "Episode Ten")	Nominated	
67th Primetime Emmy Awards	Outstanding Supporting Actress in a Limited Series or a Movie	Regina King (episode: "Episode Four")	Won	
67th Primetime Emmy Awards	Outstanding Writing for a Limited Series, Movie or a Dramatic Special	John Ridley (episode: "Episode One")	Nominated	
20th Satellite Awards	Best Actor in a Television Series – Drama	Timothy Hutton	Nominated	
20th Satellite Awards	Best Actress in a Television Series – Drama	Felicity Huffman	Nominated	
20th Satellite Awards	Best Ensemble – Television Series	Felicity Huffman, Timothy Hutton, W. Earl Brown, Regina King, Richard Cabral, Caitlin Gerard, Benito Martinez, Penelope Ann Miller, Elvis Nolasco, and Johnny Ortiz	Won	
20th Satellite Awards	Best Supporting Actor – Series, Miniseries or Television Film	Elvis Nolasco	Nominated	
20th Satellite Awards	Best Supporting Actress – Series, Miniseries or Television Film	Regina King	Nominated	
20th Satellite Awards	Best Television Series – Drama	American Crime	Nominated	
47th NAACP Image Awards	Outstanding Director in a Drama Series	John Ridley (episode: "Episode One")	Won	
47th NAACP Image Awards	Outstanding Director in a Drama Series	Millicent Shelton (episode: "Episode Ten")	Nominated	
47th NAACP Image Awards	Outstanding Supporting Actress in a Drama Series	Regina King	Won	
47th NAACP Image Awards	Outstanding Television Movie, Mini-Series or Dramatic Special	American Crime	Nominated	
47th NAACP Image Awards	Outstanding Writer in a Drama Series	John Ridley (episode: "Episode One")	Nominated	
73rd Golden Globe Awards	Best Actress – Miniseries or Television Film	Felicity Huffman	Nominated	
73rd Golden Globe Awards	Best Miniseries or Television Film	American Crime	Nominated	
73rd Golden Globe Awards	Best Supporting Actress – Series, Miniseries or Television Film	Regina King	Nominated	
Season 2
68th Primetime Emmy Awards	Outstanding Lead Actress in a Limited Series or Movie	Felicity Huffman	Nominated	
68th Primetime Emmy Awards	Outstanding Lead Actress in a Limited Series or Movie	Lili Taylor	Nominated	
68th Primetime Emmy Awards	Outstanding Limited Series	American Crime	Nominated	
68th Primetime Emmy Awards	Outstanding Supporting Actress in a Limited Series or Movie	Regina King (episode: "Season Two: Episode Eight")	Won	
7th Critics' Choice Television Awards	Best Actress in a Movie or Limited Series	Felicity Huffman	Nominated	
7th Critics' Choice Television Awards	Best Actress in a Movie or Limited Series	Lili Taylor	Nominated	
7th Critics' Choice Television Awards	Best Supporting Actress in a Movie or Limited Series	Regina King	Won	
74th Golden Globe Awards	Best Actress – Miniseries or Television Film	Felicity Huffman	Nominated	
74th Golden Globe Awards	Best Miniseries or Television Film	American Crime	Nominated	
23rd Screen Actors Guild Awards	Outstanding Performance by a Female Actor in a Television Movie or Limited Series	Felicity Huffman	Nominated	
69th Writers Guild of America Awards	Long Form – Original	Julie Hébert, Sonay Hoffman, Keith Huff, Stacy A. Littlejohn, Kirk A. Moore, Davy Perez, Diana Son	Nominated	
Season 3
69th Primetime Emmy Awards	Outstanding Lead Actress in a Limited Series or Movie	Felicity Huffman	Nominated	
69th Primetime Emmy Awards	Outstanding Supporting Actress in a Limited Series or Movie	Regina King	Nominated	
