= Angelique Rivera =

American actress (born 1993)

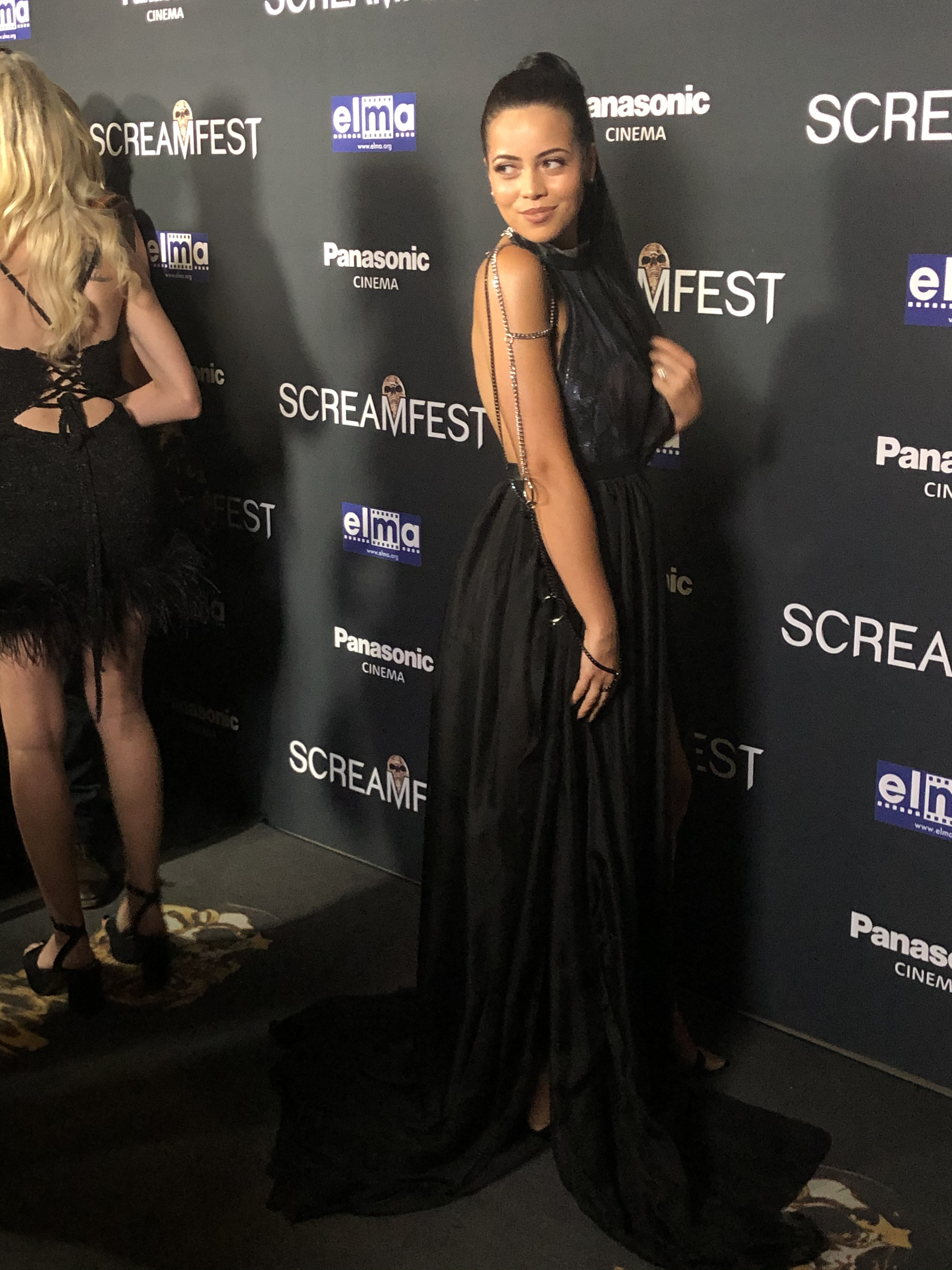
- Rivera on the Red Carpet at Screamfest
- Born: 1993 (age 32–33); Chicago, United States of America
- Education: University of Florida (BFA, 2014)
- Occupation: Actress
- Years active: 2016–present

Angelique Rivera (born 1993) is an American actress, best known for her starring roles in American Crime, and Don't Worry, He Won't Get Far on Foot.

== Personal life and education ==
Rivera was born in Chicago, then lived in Richmond, Virginia, before being raised in Kissimmee, Florida. While there, she starred in her high school's musicals as well as in local community theater productions. In December 2014, she graduated from the University of Florida with a Bachelor's of Fine Arts (BFA) degree in Theatre Performance.

== Career ==
After relocating to Los Angeles, Rivera booked one of the lead roles on the television series American Crime opposite Felicity Huffman and Timothy Hutton. Entertainment Weekly said of her performance that she has "been delivering one of American Crime‘s most powerful performances this season".

Since completing American Crime, she has worked on independent films such as Don't Worry, He Won't Get Far on Foot and Eat, Brains, Love. She has one son, born 2010.

== Filmography ==
=== Film ===
Film appearances
| Year | Title | Role | Notes |
|---|---|---|---|
| 2017 | Avenge the Crows | Cammy | |
| 2018 | Don't Worry, He Won't Get Far on Foot | Terry Alvarado | |
| 2019 | Eat, Brains, Love | Amanda Blake | |

=== Television ===
Television appearances
| Year | Title | Role | Notes |
|---|---|---|---|
| 2016 | American Crime | Evy Dominguez | Series regular |
| 2016 | The Crooked Man | Olivia Shaw | TV Movie |
| 2017 | Supernatural | Gwen Hernandez | Episode: "Somewhere Between Heaven and Hell" |
| 2017 | Drink Slay Love | Antoinette | TV Movie |
