= Tankhouse (film) =

- Directed by: Noam Tomaschoff
- Written by: Noam Tomaschoff; Chelsea Frei
- Produced by: Matthew Cooper; Bill Marcin Jr. Jim Manney; Noam Tomaschoff; Chelsea Frei
- Starring: Tara Holt; Stephen Friedrich; Richard Kind; Christopher Lloyd
- Production company: Click Content Studios
- Distributed by: Vertical Entertainment
- Release date: May 9, 2022 (Fargo)
- Running time: 94 minutes
- Country: United States
- Language: English

Tankhouse is a 2022 American comedy film written by Noam Tomaschoff and Chelsea Frei, directed by Tomaschoff and starring Tara Holt, Stephen Friedrich, Richard Kind and Christopher Lloyd.

== Plot ==
After being blacklisted from the NYC theatre industry, two Upper East Side New Yorkers, Tucker and Sandrene, decide their only course of action is to move to Fargo, ND and start a theatrical revolution.

== Cast ==
- Tara Holt as Sandrene
- Stephen Friedrich as Tucker
- Richard Kind as Morten
- Christopher Lloyd as Buford
- Alex Esola as Hank
- Austin Crute as Jack
- Carolyn Michelle Smith as Pauline
- Devere Rogers as Uther
- Joe Adler as Yorick
- Luke Spencer Roberts as Brady
- Nadia Alexander as Leah
- Rachel Matthews as Mackenzie
- Sarah Yarkin as Nina
- Joey Lauren Adams as Deirdra
- Andy Buckley as Bob
- Jessamine Burgum as Ashley

== Production ==
The film was shot in Fargo, North Dakota and Los Angeles. Filming began in Fargo in September 2019.

== Release ==
In April 2022, it was announced that the North American distribution rights to the film were acquired by Vertical Entertainment. The film premiered at the Fargo Theater in Fargo on May 9, 2022. Then it was released in theaters and on VOD on May 13, 2022.

== Reception ==
The film has a 40% rating on Rotten Tomatoes based on ten reviews.

Rachel Labonte of Screen Rant awarded the film three stars out of five. Sandie Angulo Chen of Common Sense Media also awarded the film three stars out of five.
