= Sarah Yarkin =

American actress

- Born: May 28, 1993 (age 32); Alameda, California, U.S.
- Occupation: Actor
- Years active: 2011–present

Sarah Yarkin is an American actress. She initially gained recognition for her main role as Peg on season 3 of the YouTube Premium television series Foursome (2017).

Following Foursome, Yarkin had a supporting role in the science fiction horror film Happy Death Day 2U (2019) and starred in the horror comedy film Eat, Brains, Love (2019). In the 2020s, she had the lead role in the slasher film Texas Chainsaw Massacre (2022) before her breakout with a main role as Rhonda Rosen on the Paramount+ teen drama series School Spirits (2023–present).

== Career ==
In July 2017, Yarkin was cast in a leading role in the USA Network television pilot Olive Forever, which ultimately was not ordered to series. In 2018, Yarkin was cast in a supporting role in the horror film Happy Death Day 2U.

In January 2020, Yarkin was cast in a recurring role on the Freeform television series Motherland: Fort Salem. In 2022, she starred in the Netflix slasher film Texas Chainsaw Massacre.

In 2023, Yarkin began starring on the Paramount+ series School Spirits. In March 2025, Yarkin was cast in the thriller film The Silence Game.

== Filmography ==
=== Film ===
Year	Title	Role	Notes
2015	Felly	Melissa	Short film
2018	Alcoholocaust	Franny Morris	Short film
2019	Happy Death Day 2U	Andrea "Dre" Morgan	
2019	Eat Brains Love	Cass	
2022	Texas Chainsaw Massacre	Melody	
2022	Tankhouse	Nina	
2022	Not Okay	Julie	
2024	Agonist	Leah	Short film

=== Television ===
Year	Title	Role	Notes
2015	The Middle	Girl	Episode: "The Shirt"
2016	Transparent	Young Debra	Episode: "If I Were a Bell"
2016	The Good Place	Gloria	Episode: "...Someone Like Me as a Member"
2017	Bizaardvark	Science Girl	Episode: "Science (Un)Fair"
2017	Foursome	Peg	Main cast (season 3); 10 episodes
2017	American Horror Story: Cult	Riley	Episode: "Charles (Manson) in Charge"
2019–2020	Single Parents	Homily Pronstroller	Recurring role (season 2); 5 episodes
2020	Motherland: Fort Salem	Libba Swythe	Recurring role (season 1); 6 episodes
2023–present	School Spirits	Rhonda	Main cast; 16 episodes
2023	Platonic	Maddie	2 episodes

=== Podcast ===
Year	Title	Role	Notes
2020	Borrasca	Kimber Destaro	7 episodes
