= Don't Worry, He Won't Get Far on Foot =

2018 film directed by Gus Van Sant

- Theatrical release poster
- Directed by: Gus Van Sant
- Screenplay by: Gus Van Sant
- Story by: John Callahan; Gus Van Sant; Jack Gibson; William Andrew Eatman
- Based on: Don't Worry, He Won't Get Far on Foot by John Callahan
- Produced by: Charles-Marie Anthonioz; Mourad Belkeddar; Steve Golin; Nicholas Lhermitte
- Starring: Joaquin Phoenix; Jonah Hill; Rooney Mara; Jack Black
- Cinematography: Christopher Blauvelt
- Edited by: Gus Van Sant; David Marks
- Music by: Danny Elfman
- Production companies: Iconoclast; Anonymous Content
- Distributed by: Amazon Studios
- Release dates: January 19, 2018 (Sundance); July 14, 2018 (United States)
- Running time: 114 minutes
- Country: United States
- Language: English
- Budget: $3.5 million
- Box office: $4.2 million

Don't Worry, He Won't Get Far on Foot is a 2018 American comedy drama film directed by Gus Van Sant and based upon the 1989 memoir by John Callahan. The cast includes Joaquin Phoenix, Jonah Hill, Rooney Mara, and Jack Black, and follows a recently paralyzed alcoholic who finds a passion for drawing off-color newspaper cartoons.

The film had its world premiere at the 2018 Sundance Film Festival on January 19, 2018, and was released on July 14, 2018, by Amazon Studios.

== Plot ==
Based in Portland, John Callahan was an American cartoonist known for his work and his experiences with quadriplegia and alcoholism. The film explores his life and career, including the events that shaped his personal experiences and artistic development.

On the morning before his accident, John wakes up still drunk and hurries to purchase more alcohol so withdrawal would not set in. That evening, he meets Dexter at a party in Long Beach. They leave together in a car and as the night progresses, they get increasingly drunk, intermittently vomiting. They sneak into an amusement park and go to a strip club.

Upon leaving the strip club, Dexter insists on driving, although a bystander points out they both are too impaired. He falls asleep at the wheel and runs into an electrical pole at high speed, causing severe injury to John, who was also asleep. At the hospital, he learns that he is now a quadriplegic.

John comes across several apathetic medical personnel in the hospital, including groups of medical students who periodically pass through and talk about him and others like they are not sentient beings. Finally, he connects with Swedish physical therapist Annu, who treats him there.

John and Annu chat whilst she works on him. He tells her he is desperate to not be paralyzed for life, alternatively praying to God and making pacts with the devil. They discover they have several things in common.

The hospital soon equips John with an electric wheelchair, which gives him back some independence. One night he and a fellow patient go out in their wheelchairs and, on their return to the rehabilitation center, they narrowly miss getting hit by a train.

John was given up for adoption when he was small, and now is very eager to track down his birth mother. One official does find a file on John, but tells him that Oregon law forbids him from reading it. John sees the name Maggie Lynch on the file, but the official is unable to confirm or deny that this is John's mother, leaving John distraught.

John suffers a number of other upsetting events as well. When his electric wheelchair breaks down, he calls the Disability Resource Center for help, but is denied help as they have had cutbacks. This leaves him temporarily unable to get around without help. He also has frequent conflicts with his somewhat apathetic carer, Tim. During one particularly low period, this conflict becomes especially intense and John becomes desperate to drink away his depression. This leads to him having an epiphany through a vision of his birth mother, and he decides to quit drinking. Over time, he is able to get sober with help from his Alcoholics Anonymous (AA) sponsor, Donnie. At the AA meetings, John learns to be transparent and not to play the victim.

As he proceeds through the 12 Steps of AA, John is inspired to become a cartoonist. He builds a new life and earns money by drawing off-color cartoons for magazines and newspapers. Later, John runs into Annu, who now is a flight attendant. She becomes his girlfriend, and they fall in love.

At AA, John works through his abandonment issues and self-destructive behavior. Just as he reaches the 12th step, Donnie dies of AIDS. Later John accepts the award that was shown at the beginning of the film.

== Cast ==
- Joaquin Phoenix as John Callahan
  - Ethan Michael Mora as Young John Callahan
- Jonah Hill as Donnie Green
- Rooney Mara as Annu
- Jack Black as Dexter
- Mark Webber as Mike
- Udo Kier as Hans
- Kim Gordon as Corky
- Beth Ditto as Reba
- Carrie Brownstein as Suzanne
- Heather Matarazzo as Shannon
- Tony Greenhand as Tim
- Olivia Hamilton as Nurse Lily
- Angelique Rivera as Terry Alvarado
- Ronnie Adrian as Martingale
- Rebecca Rittenhouse as Bonnie
- Ron Perkins as Morton Kimble
- Rebecca Field as Margie Bighew
- Emilio Rivera as Jesus Alvarado
- Sunny Suljic as Skateboarder #2
- Mireille Enos as Maggie Lynch
- Nick Rutherford as Drinker
- Betsy Sodaro as Powell's Information Person

== Production ==
Initially, Robin Williams (who died four years before the film's release) had optioned the book and invited the film's director Gus Van Sant to adapt it. On November 29, 2016, it was announced that actor Joaquin Phoenix was teaming with director Van Sant for the biographical film of cartoonist John Callahan, based on Callahan's autobiography Don't Worry, He Won't Get Far on Foot. Charles-Marie Anthonioz, Mourad Belkeddar, and Nicolas Lhermitte would produce the film for Iconoclast, and Steve Golin for Anonymous Content.

In December 2016, Rooney Mara and Jonah Hill joined the cast of the film. Hill considers his performance in the film to be the best of his career. In February 2017, Jack Black joined the cast of the film. In March 2017, Mark Webber and Angelique Rivera joined the cast of the film. Principal photography began on March 6, 2017, and concluded on April 6, 2017. The film was shot by Christopher Blauvelt.

== Release ==
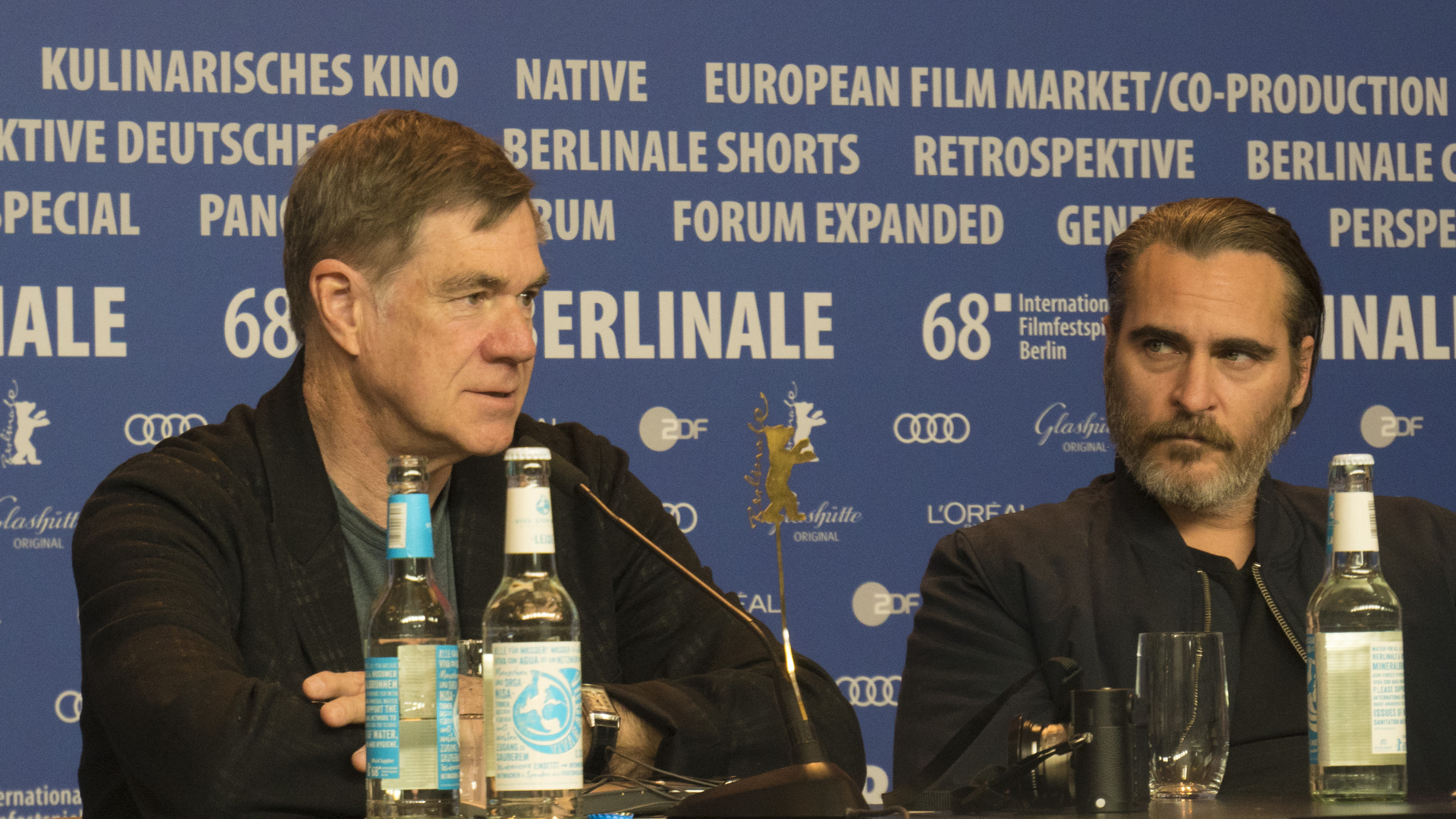
Van Sant (left) and Phoenix promoting the film at Berlin International Film Festival

Amazon Studios distributed the film. It had its world premiere at the Sundance Film Festival on January 19, 2018 and also screened at the Berlin International Film Festival on February 20, 2018. It was scheduled to be released on May 11, 2018, then was pushed back to July 13, 2018.

== Reception ==
On review aggregator Rotten Tomatoes, the film has an approval rating of 77% based on 192 reviews, with an average of 6.6/10. The website's critical consensus reads, "Don't Worry, He Won't Get Far on Foot avoids inspirational biopic clichés thanks to sensitive work from writer-director Gus Van Sant and the admirable efforts of a well-chosen cast." On Metacritic, the film has a weighted average score of 67 out of 100, based on 39 critics, indicating "generally favorable" reviews.

David Rooney of The Hollywood Reporter gave the film a positive review, writing: "This unwieldy but consistently enjoyable portrait of paraplegic local hero John Callahan is notable for its generosity of spirit and gentleness". Peter Debruge of Variety gave the film a positive review, calling it a "life-affirming sweet-and-sour concoction" and writing, "Some will find it entirely too sentimental, others a tad repetitive (Callahan tends to repeat the same stories), but it's hard to argue with a movie that celebrates the kind of recovery he went through."
