= World War II: When Lions Roared =

- UK DVD cover art
- Genre: Drama; History; War
- Screenplay by: David Rintels
- Directed by: Joseph Sargent
- Starring: Michael Caine; John Lithgow; Bob Hoskins
- Music by: John Morris
- Country of origin: United States
- Original language: English

Production
- Executive producer: Ethel Winant
- Producers: Bruce M. Kerner; David W. Rintels; Victoria Riskin
- Production location: Prague, Czech Republic
- Cinematography: John A. Alonzo
- Editor: John A. Martinelli
- Running time: 194 minutes
- Production companies: Gideon Productions; The Kushner-Locke Company; World International Network

Original release
- Network: NBC
- Release: April 19 – April 20, 1994

World War II: When Lions Roared (also known as Then There Were Giants) is a 1994 American war television miniseries, directed by Joseph Sargent, and starring Michael Caine, John Lithgow and Bob Hoskins as the three major Allied leaders, Joseph Stalin, Franklin D. Roosevelt and Winston Churchill respectively. It was notable as the first video production to be produced in high-definition video for broadcast in the United States, using the Sony HDVS line of analog high-definition equipment, although it was broadcast by the NBC television network in standard NTSC resolution.

== Plot ==
The film portrays Franklin D. Roosevelt, Winston Churchill, and Joseph Stalin as they maneuver their countries through several of the major events of World War II - such events include the Blitz, Operation Barbarossa, the bombing of Pearl Harbor, the North African Campaign, the Allied invasion of Italy, the Tehran Conference, and the Yalta Conference. The Big Three discuss Operation Overlord in Tehran, and the formation of the United Nations and the future of Poland at Yalta. The film concludes with the death of Roosevelt and the end of the war in Europe.

In particular, the focus is on the relationship between the leaders themselves and the large strategic concerns at play, with little scrutiny given to the decisions taking place at a lower level - an example of this is how, despite his personal disdain for communism, Churchill was willing to go to great lengths to aid the Soviet Union in their fight against Nazi Germany.

== Cast ==
- Michael Caine as Joseph Stalin
- John Lithgow as Franklin D. Roosevelt
- Bob Hoskins as Winston Churchill
- Ed Begley Jr. as Harry Hopkins
- Jan Triska as Vyacheslav Molotov
- Corey Burton as Radio News Announcer

== Awards ==
It was nominated for 6 Emmy Awards, including Best Actor for Michael Caine, but only won for Outstanding Individual Achievement in Lighting Direction (Electronic) for a Drama Series, Variety Series, Miniseries or a Special.

== Reception and response ==
Critical response was highly favorable. The Los Angeles Times stated that "If you're seeking affirmation that U.S. television still has an epic drama or two up its sleeve, and even an artistic pulse, tune in the NBC two-parter, 'World War II: When Lions Roared,' tonight and Wednesday night. Written and produced by David W. Rintels, it's stunningly successful both as vibrant entertainment and as a personalized, peephole-widening account of history from a serious and creative dramatist."

Variety Magazine said "Use of John Lithgow, Michael Caine and Bob Hoskins as Roosevelt, Stalin and Churchill might qualify as 'stunt' casting, particularly as Caine and Hoskins are virtually unrecognizable under makeup. Still, they turn in fine perfs, notably Hoskins, who (maybe because of extensive use of Churchill's writings as source) winds up with most screen time. He seems to have the most fun of the three, throwing himself into a larger-than-life character whose every utterance sounds like a carefully planned oratory."

== Home media ==
Certain UK home versions used an edited version of the film running at 115 minutes, under the alternate title of Then There Were Giants. The complete film was released on a two-disc DVD set on February 13, 2007.
