= Stacy A. Littlejohn =

American screenwriter

- Born: Stacy Littlejohn; U.S.
- Occupations: Writer; Producer; Showrunner

Stacy A. Littlejohn is an American screenwriter, producer and showrunner. She was the creator, writer and an executive producer of the VH1 network television series Single Ladies. Littlejohn has worked as a writer on Fox network's The Wanda Sykes Show, as a writer and supervising producer on The CW's All of Us, and as a producer on ABC's Life with Bonnie. She is currently working as a writer & co-executive producer on Empire.

== Early life ==
Littlejohn was born in the San Francisco Bay Area. She attended the University of California, Berkeley with initial plans of becoming a criminal defense attorney, but along the way reevaluated her direction and shifted focus to Mass Communications. In her last year of college, she worked in the writer's room as an intern on Nickelodeon's sitcom My Brother and Me.

== Career ==
After college, Littlejohn relocated to Los Angeles where she worked as a PA on Fox's The Last Frontier before securing a job as a writer's assistant to Matt Wickline and John Bowman on The Show. She then worked on the sitcom Moesha for a brief stint before Wickline offered her a job writing for a show he was creating for D.L. Hughley, ABC's sitcom The Hughleys.

Littlejohn next worked on such shows as One on One, Life with Bonnie, Platinum, Cedric the Entertainer Presents and Barbershop. She also lent her talents to an episode of Half & Half before working as a writer and producer on Will Smith's All of Us, culminating in Smith flying her out to New York to assist him on rewrites for the big-screen blockbuster Hitch.

During the 2007–2008 Writers Guild of America strike, Littlejohn found herself unemployed for the first time since the age of 16. She took the time to work on a script she had been writing called Modern Love. Producer Maggie Malina of VH1, who was working with Queen Latifah's Flavor Unit in search of the right project, read the script and asked Littlejohn to pitch a show. Littlejohn responded with VH1's first-ever hour-long scripted series Single Ladies, which debuted May 30, 2011. Along with the season 3 premiere of Basketball Wives, Single Ladies posted the network's highest ratings since October 2009 with its two-hour premiere drawing a 1.2 rating in the key P18-49 demo and 1.8 million total viewers. Combined with its 12am encore, Single Ladies drew in a total of 2.8 million viewers.

She worked as a writer and producer on American Crime, on ABC, created by John Ridley. She has more recently worked on Lethal Weapon, Proven Innocent and Dirty John. She had been developing an Empire spin-off series, but it was cancelled.
