= Erik Bork =

American screenwriter

- Born: Dayton, OH
- Occupations: Screenwriter and producer
- Spouse: Margaret Owen
- Writing career
- Notable works: Band of Brothers, From the Earth to the Moon

Erik Bork is a screenwriter, producer, script consultant and blogger best known for his work on the HBO miniseries Band of Brothers and From the Earth to the Moon, for which he wrote multiple episodes, and won two Emmy and two Golden Globe Awards as part of the producing team.

== Background ==
Bork got his start in Hollywood as an assistant to Tom Hanks, who gave him the opportunity to help write and produce From the Earth to the Moon, after reading some sitcom spec scripts he had written.

== Career ==
Bork has sold series pitches (and written pilots) at NBC and FOX, worked on the writing staff for two primetime dramas, and written feature screenplays on assignment for companies including Universal Studios, HBO, TNT, and Playtone.

Bork also teaches screenwriting for UCLA Extension Writers' Program, National University and The Writers Store, and offers one-on-one consulting to writers. His blog was named one of the top 10 most influential screenwriting blogs in 2013.
