= Diana Son =

American writer

- Born: Philadelphia, Pennsylvania, U.S.
- Education: New York University
- Occupations: Playwright, producer, writer
- Years active: 1998–present
- Spouse: none
- Children: 3

Diana Miae Son is an American playwright, television producer, and writer. She is known for her work on American Crime, Law & Order: Criminal Intent, Southland, and Blue Bloods. She, along with Brian Yorkey, has also served as the showrunner for 13 Reasons Why.

== Early life ==
Son was born in Philadelphia, Pennsylvania and raised in Dover, Delaware, which Son has described as a very small town with very few Asian Americans. Son has an older brother, Grant Son.

Son's father, Yong Sup Son, and mother, Soon Chum "Ruby" Son, were both from Korea. Son's mother came to the United States in 1963. She had six sisters in Korea. Son's parents met in Philadelphia, where her father was a student at the College of Pharmacy (now the University of the Sciences) and her mother was an exchange nurse at Lankenau Medical Center. They moved to Dover in 1967, where they owned and operated the Town Drug Store in the Milford Shopping Center in Milford, Delaware. Son grew up working in the drug store.

Son credits seeing Joseph Papp's production of Hamlet at the Joseph Papp Public Theater and New York Shakespeare Festival on a 1983 high school senior class trip for her inspiration to be a playwright. Diane Venora starred in the lead role of Hamlet. Hamlet was the first play she saw, and it was her first visit to a theater.

Son studied Dramatic Literature at New York University. When she was a senior in college she interned at La MaMa Experimental Theatre Club, an off-off Broadway theatre and cultural institution.

=== Theater ===
Son's first play was called Wrecked On Brecht and was published in 1987. For eight to 10 years, she wrote and produced short plays in the downtown area of Manhattan. Her play BOY premiered at La Jolla Playhouse in 1996 and was directed by Michael Greif. The storyline for BOY is based on Son's mother's family adopting a male cousin. It is a story in which a young girl's parents decide to raise her as a son. In 1998, her play Fishes premiered at New Georges in New York City. Son wrote the short play R.A.W. ('Cause I'm A Woman), which explores how men view Asian American women.

Her first full-length play, Stop Kiss, debuted in 1998. It was critically acclaimed. The play was produced Off-Broadway in 1998 at The Public Theater in New York City. It was extended three times. The play's initial run featured Jessica Hecht, Saul Stein, Sandra Oh, Saundra McClain, Kevin Carroll, and Rick Holmes. Son met Oh—who has participated in readings of every play by Son since they met—in 1995 in Los Angeles while involved in the New Works Festival. The play features two women who kiss on the street, and are "grievously injured" in an attack. Themes include gay bashing and identity.

After the first night's performance of Stop Kiss, Son realized she would no longer have to do "copyediting, proofreading, waitressing, and temping"—jobs she took to support herself before the play came out. It has since been produced by hundreds of theaters. In 2014, Stop Kiss was produced at the Pasadena Playhouse, where it made the Los Angeles Times' "Best of 2014" list.

In 2006, Son wrote Satellites, a play Sandra Oh starred in that was directed by Michael Greif at The Public Theater.

=== Television ===
Son has worked in television since 2000, starting out as a story editor for The West Wing. She was Playwright in Residence at the Taper during the same period. She has also worked on Law & Order: Criminal Intent, Southland, and Blue Bloods.

==== Recent work ====
In March 2015, Son began work on the ABC series American Crime. At the 2015 TCAs, NBC ordered the pilot for Love is a Four Letter Word. It will be produced by 20th Century Fox Television and Red Arrow’s U.S. scripted arm, Fabrik Entertainment. Son will write and executive produce with Mikkel Bondesen and Kristen Campo.

== Personal life ==
Son has taught playwriting at Yale University and New York University. As of 2015, Son is the Playwriting Program Chair of the Dramatists Guild of America's Fellows Program, a mentorship and support program for playwrights and musical theater writers. She is a member of the Dramatists Guild of America, Women in Theatre, and the Writers Guild of America, East. Son is an alumna of New Dramatists. Son has written much of her work (plays and television) at the non-profit urban writer's colony The Writers' Room in Greenwich Village.

Son lives in Brooklyn, New York.

Son has said her parents are very supportive of her writing career.

== Filmography ==
Year	Title	Notes
2000	The West Wing	Story Editor (2 episodes)
2004–2008	Law & Order: Criminal Intent	Supervising Producer (23 episodes), Co-Executive Producer (22 episodes), Co-Producer (22 episodes), Producer (21 episodes); Teleplay by (13 episodes), Story by (12 episodes), Written by (1 episode); Executive Story Editor (17 episodes)
2010	Southland	Consulting Producer (6 episodes); Story by (1 episode), Written by (1 episode)
2012	NYC 22	Co-Executive Producer (12 episodes); Written by (1 episode)
2013	Do No Harm	Consulting Producer (12 episodes); Written by (1 episode)
2013	Jo	Executive Producer (8 episodes); Story by (2 episode), Teleplay (2 episodes)
2010–2014	Blue Bloods	Co-Executive Producer (13 episodes), Consulting Producer (10 episodes); Written by (4 episodes), Story by (1 episode)
2015	Love is a Four-Letter Word	Executive Producer; Written by
2015–2016	American Crime	Co-Executive Producer (20 episodes); Written by (2 episodes)
2017	13 Reasons Why	Executive Producer (13 episodes); Teleplay by (2 episodes)
2017	Law & Order: True Crime - The Menendez Murders	Consulting Producer (8 episodes); Written by (2 episodes)
2018–2019	Dirty John	Co-Executive producer (7 episodes), Consulting producer (1 episode); Written by (1 episode)
2021	Genius	Executive producer (8 episodes); Story by (1 episode), Teleplay by (1 episode), Written by (2 episodes)
2025	Butterfly	Executive producer (6 episodes); Written by (1 episode)
2026–present	Line of Fire	Co-executive producer; Written by (1 episode)

== Awards and grants ==
- Won the Berilla Kerr Award for Playwriting
- GLAAD Media Award for Best New York Production for Stop Kiss
- Nominated for the John Gassner Playwriting prize
- Recipient of an NEA/TCG Theatre Residency Grant with the Mark Taper Forum
- Brooks Atkinson Fellowship at the Royal National Theatre in London
- A member of the Playwrights Unit in Residence at the Joseph Papp Public Theater

== Works and publications ==
=== Short plays ===
- Son, Diana. Wrecked On Brecht. 1987
- Son, Diana. Stealing Fire. 1992
- Son, Diana. 2000 Miles. 1993.
- Son, Diana. R.A.W. ('Cause I'm a Woman) 1993.
- Son, Diana. Happy Birthday Jack. Dixon, Michael Bigelow, and Amy Wegener. Humana Festival '99: The Complete Plays. Lyme, NH: Smith and Kraus, 1999. ISBN 978-1-575-25207-0
- Son, Diana. The Moon Please. Lane, Eric, and Nina Shengold. Take Ten II: More Ten-Minute Plays. New York: Vintage, 2003. ISBN 978-1-400-03217-4
- Son, Diana. BOY. Yew, Chay. Version 3.0: Contemporary Asian American Plays. New York: Theatre Communications Group, 2011. ISBN 978-1-559-36363-1
- Son, Diana. R.A.W. ('Cause I'm A Woman). Perkins, Kathy A., and Roberta Uno. Contemporary Plays by Women of Color: An Anthology. London: Routledge, 1996. pp. 289–296. ISBN 978-0-415-11377-9
- Son, Diana. Fishes. 1998.
- Son, Diana. Siberia. 2003.
- Son, Diana. The Moon Please. Great Short Plays: Volume 10. New York: Playscripts, 2013. pp. 63–74.
- Son, Diana. Blind Date. 2011.
- Son, Diana. Axis. Tricycle Theatre. The Bomb: A Partial History. London: Oberon Books, 2012. ISBN 978-1-849-43152-1

=== Full length plays ===
- Son, Diana. Stop Kiss. Woodstock, NY: Overlook Press, 1999. ISBN 978-0-879-51737-3
- Son, Diana. Satellites. New York: Dramatists Play Service, 2008. ISBN 978-0-822-22227-9

=== Essay ===
- Son, Diana. I Will Follow. Hodges, Ben, and Paula Vogel. The Play That Changed My Life: America's Foremost Playwrights on the Plays That Influenced Them. New York: Applause Theatre & Cinema Books, 2009. pp. 136–141. ISBN 978-1-557-83740-0
