= Julie Hébert =

American writer and director

Julie Hébert (sometimes credited as Julie Hebert) is an American writer/director of theater, film and television.

== Biography ==
Julie Hébert grew up in a small town on the Louisiana coast and many of her plays are set there. After college she moved to San Francisco. She started by directing and writing plays for the Magic Theater, the Eureka, the Bay Area Playwrights Festival and soon moved on to national theater companies including Steppenwolf, La Mama, Circle Rep, the Women's Project, LATC, and San Diego Rep. Hébert's plays have been honored with two PEN Awards for Drama. Her play Tree opened at San Francisco Playhouse in January 2015.

She adapted the novel Female Perversions into a screenplay with Susan Stretfield. Stretfield went on to direct the film, Female Perversions (1996). In 2000 she wrote a television film entitled All-American Girl: The Mary Kay Letourneau Story.

In television, Hébert worked and trained with John Wells for five years, starting with Third Watch in 2001. She wrote two second-season episodes entitled "Know Thyself" and "Man Enough". Her first television writing effort, "Know Thyself" was honored with a Prism Award. Later that year she began her career as an episodic director when she co-directed the third-season premiere, a documentary about 9/11, "In Their Own Words" alongside John Wells, for which they won a George Foster Peabody Award. In 2002 she helmed her first episode independently, "Superheroes: Part Two", which aired later in the third season. In 2003 she was hired as an executive story editor for Third Watch. She wrote three episodes for the third season – "He Said, She Said", "The Long Guns" and "The Unforgiven". While working on Third Watch she adapted her original play Ruby's Bucket of Blood into a TV film for Showtime, starting Angela Bassett.

In 2002, Hebert became involved with ER, another Wells production series, as a co-producer for the ninth season. She co-wrote "A Hopeless Wound" with supervising producer Joe Sachs. She returned after the mid-season break as a producer and wrote a further ninth-season episode "A Little Help from My Friends". She was also hired to direct a ninth-season episode entitled "The Advocate". Hébert remained with the series as a director and helmed two episodes for the tenth season, "Shifts Happen" in 2003 and "Midnight" in 2004. She then wrote and directed the eleventh-season episode "Twas the Night".

In 2004, she became involved with the fifth season of The West Wing (also a Wells production series) as a director. She helmed two fifth-season episodes, "Slow News Day" and "No Exit". She returned in fall 2004 to direct the sixth-season episode "The Hubbert Peak".

In 2005, she was hired as a writer and consulting producer for Numb3rs. She scripted two episodes for the second season, "In Plain Sight" in 2005 and "All's Fair" in 2006. She was promoted to co-executive producer for the third season. She scripted a further three episodes for the third season; "Waste Not" in 2006; "Nine Wives" in 2006; and "The Art of Reckoning" in 2007. She also made her directing debut for the series with "Nine Wives". She remained a co-executive producer, writer and director for the fourth season and wrote the episode "Primacy" in 2007 and wrote and directed the episode "Power" in 2008. She returned in the same capacity for the fifth season and wrote and directed "Thirty Six-Hours" in 2008, directed "Trouble in Chinatown", and scripted "Animal Rites" in 2009.

In 2010, Hébert worked in New York, writing two episodes for the CBS series Blue Bloods ("Re-Do" and "What You See"), and directing an episode of The Good Wife called "Nine Hours". In 2011 she became involved with the series Rizzoli & Isles as a co-executive producer, writing the episode entitled "Brown-Eyed Girl". Her next venture was the critically acclaimed series Boss, where she worked as a co-executive producer, writing two episodes, "Redemption" and "Clinch".

In 2013 and 2014, Hébert directed three episodes of Nashville, "I Saw the Light", "You're No Angel Yourself" and "Your Wild Life's Gonna Get You Down ". She was also involved with the ABC series American Crime as a co-executive producer, writer and director.

She served as co-executive producer on the fourth season of the Amazon Prime Video series The Man In The High Castle.
