= Freaky (film) =

2020 American slasher film

- Theatrical release poster
- Directed by: Christopher Landon
- Written by: Michael Kennedy; Christopher Landon
- Produced by: Jason Blum
- Starring: Vince Vaughn; Kathryn Newton; Katie Finneran; Misha Osherovich; Celeste O'Connor; Alan Ruck
- Cinematography: Laurie Rose
- Edited by: Ben Baudhuin
- Music by: Bear McCreary
- Production companies: Blumhouse Productions; Divide/Conquer
- Distributed by: Universal Pictures
- Release dates: October 8, 2020 (Beyond Fest); November 13, 2020 (United States)
- Running time: 102 minutes
- Country: United States
- Language: English
- Budget: $6 million
- Box office: $18.1 million

Freaky is a 2020 American comedy slasher film directed by Christopher Landon from a screenplay by Michael Kennedy and Landon. A twist on Freaky Friday, it stars Vince Vaughn, Kathryn Newton, Katie Finneran, Misha Osherovich, Celeste O'Connor, and Alan Ruck. The film centers on a teenage girl who unintentionally switches bodies with a middle-aged male serial killer. Jason Blum produced the film under his Blumhouse Productions company.

Freaky premiered at Beyond Fest on October 8, 2020, and was theatrically released in the United States on November 13, 2020, and internationally on July 2, 2021, by Universal Pictures. The film received positive reviews from critics, who praised Vaughn and Newton's performances, as well as the blend of horror and comedy.

== Plot ==
Four teenagers discuss an urban legend of a serial killer known as the Blissfield Butcher. The Butcher breaks into the mansion they are in and promptly slaughters the group before departing with an ancient dagger known as La Dola.

The next day, bullied high school student Millie Kessler attends the Blissfield Valley High School homecoming football game, where she performs as the school mascot. As Millie waits for a ride home near the now-empty school, the Butcher arrives and attacks her. He stabs Millie in the shoulder with La Dola, causing an identical wound to appear on his shoulder. Millie's older sister Char, a police officer, arrives and scares off the Butcher. The police collect La Dola as evidence and initiate a manhunt for the Butcher.

The following morning, the Butcher and Millie discover that they have switched bodies, and they both make their way to Blissfield Valley High School. At school, the Butcher, now posing as Millie, kills Millie's chief tormentor Ryler by locking her in a cryotherapy tank in the girl's locker room. He realizes his innocent appearance grants him immunity from suspicion and fatally bisects woodshop teacher Mr. Bernardi, another one of Millie's tormentors, with a table saw. Millie, now in the Butcher's body, finds her best friends Nyla and Josh and proves her identity to them by performing the school mascot's dance routine and answering a series of personal questions. Nyla and Josh research La Dola and discover that Millie must stab the Butcher with the dagger by midnight or else the body switch will be permanent.

Later that afternoon, with the school's official homecoming cancelled, the Butcher suggests a new dance be held at an old mill that is actually his hiding place. The Butcher subsequently lures Millie's crush Booker into a monster mini golf course to kill him, but Millie, Nyla, and Josh arrive just in time to save him. Millie knocks both the Butcher and Booker unconscious, and she and her friends bring the two to Josh's house. After tying the Butcher to a chair, Millie and Nyla try to explain the situation to Booker, who remains unconvinced until Millie recites a love poem she anonymously wrote to him weeks earlier. Josh watches over the Butcher while Millie, Nyla, and Booker drive to the police station to obtain La Dola. Nyla tricks Char, the last officer in the station, into leaving so she can steal the dagger. Waiting outside in the car, Booker reveals that he has always liked Millie, and Millie divulges how she enjoys the newfound strength and confidence she feels while in the Butcher's body, and they kiss.

The Butcher eventually escapes Josh's house, and Char catches Nyla stealing La Dola. Still in the car, Millie sees the Butcher enter the police station and runs in after him, but Char tries to detain her, unaware of the situation. Millie overpowers Char and locks her in a jail cell while the Butcher escapes in a police car. At the Blissfield Valley High Homecoming dance out at the Butcher's mill, the Butcher kills three jocks who attempt to rape him, thinking he is Millie, as well as a fourth who attempted to assault Josh. As midnight approaches, Millie finds the Butcher and both Nyla and Josh hold him down while Booker staves off the police. Millie stabs the Butcher with La Dola and they switch back to their own bodies just in time, before the police shoot down the Butcher. Later, Millie and Booker reunite, and they kiss again.

After faking his death in an ambulance, the Butcher follows Millie home and attacks her, mocking her physical weakness and anxiety. Millie, Char, and their mother struggle to overpower the Butcher, but Millie finally kills him by impaling him with a broken table leg.

== Cast ==
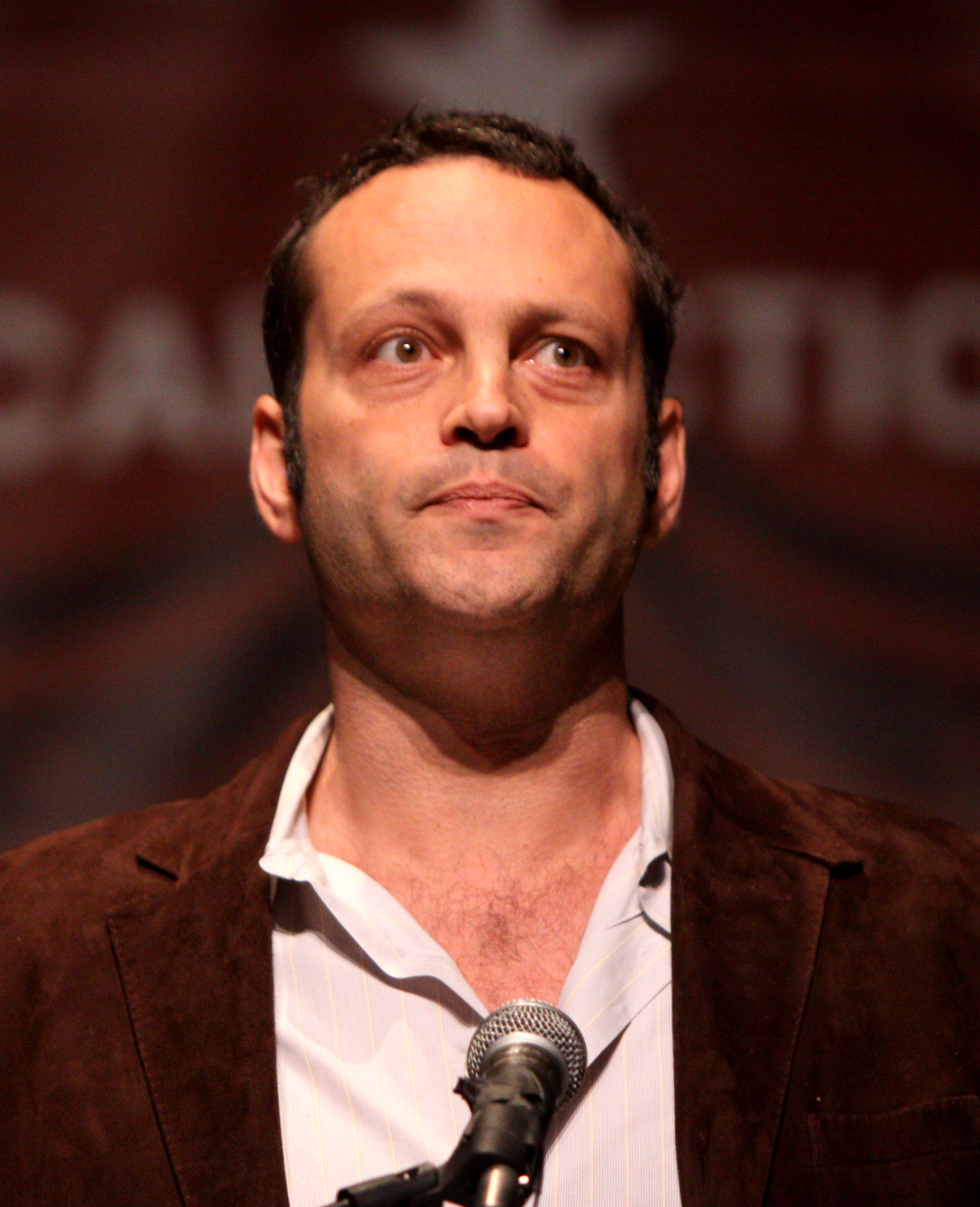
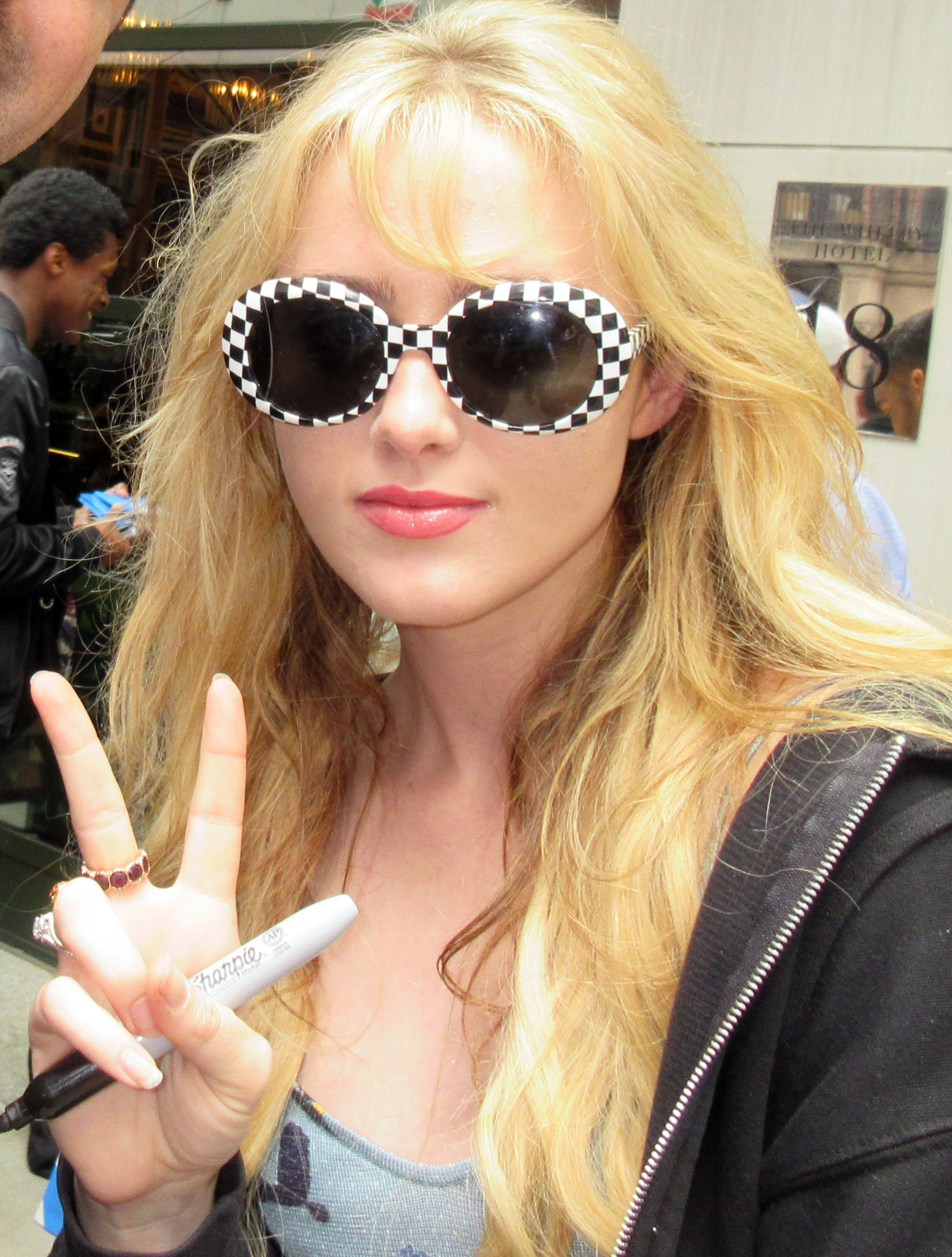
Vince Vaughn and Kathryn Newton play the Butcher and Millie respectively.
- Vince Vaughn as the Blissfield Butcher, an aging serial killer known as an urban legend in the town. He and Millie trade bodies due to a mystical dagger.
  - Vaughn also portrays Millie Kessler when she is in the Blissfield Butcher's body
- Kathryn Newton as Millie Kessler, a tormented high school student who unintentionally trades bodies with the Blissfield Butcher
  - Newton also portrays the Blissfield Butcher when he is in Millie's body
- Katie Finneran as Coral Kessler, Char and Millie's alcoholic widowed mother
- Celeste O'Connor as Nyla Chones, Millie's best friend
- Misha Osherovich as Josh Detmer, Millie's other best friend who is gay
- Alan Ruck as Mr. Bernardi, Millie's abusive and unsympathetic wood shop teacher
- Uriah Shelton as Booker Strode, Millie's love interest
- Melissa Collazo as Ryler, a girl who bullies Millie
- Dana Drori as Char Kessler, a police officer and Millie's older sister
- Michelle Ladd as Josh's mother

== Production ==
=== Development ===
Screenwriter Michael Kennedy began working on the script, then titled Killer Body, after watching the film Happy Death Day and being impressed with the film's ability to cross Groundhog Day with a slasher film. Kennedy began working with Christopher Landon shortly after presenting him an early draft of the script over lunch. In early August 2019, the film was officially announced with Landon directing and Jason Blum serving as a producer under his Blumhouse Productions banner. Specific plot details were not revealed, but the story was described as following a violent figure wreaking havoc in a small town.

Production was expected to begin in October in Atlanta, Georgia, and there was some speculation the film could be a reboot of Scream. However, Landon later debunked those rumors, stating that the project was to be an original story, taking inspiration from Mary Rodgers's Freaky Friday.

Freaky is another high-concept comedy horror film directed by Landon after Happy Death Day (2017) and Happy Death Day 2U (2019). It has been compared to various teen slasher movies, including Scream (1996) and Cherry Falls (2000).

=== Casting ===
Later in August, it was announced that Kathryn Newton and Vince Vaughn had joined the cast of the film, with the screenplay being written by Landon and Michael Kennedy. In October 2019, Uriah Shelton, Alan Ruck, Katie Finneran, Celeste O'Connor and Misha Osherovich joined the cast of the film.

=== Filming ===
Principal photography lasted for 35 days, under the original title Freaky Friday the 13th. It began on October 21, 2019, and was completed on December 12, 2019.

== Release ==
Freaky had its world premiere at Beyond Fest on October 8, 2020. It was theatrically released in the United States on November 13, 2020, by Universal Pictures. The studio spent an estimated $8 million promoting the film.

The film was made available via video on demand on December 4, 2020, by Universal Pictures Home Entertainment. Freaky aired on HBO on July 27, 2021, and began streaming on HBO Max the following day, July 28, 2021.

== Reception ==
=== Box office and VOD ===
Freaky grossed $9 million in the United States and Canada, and $9 million in other territories, for a worldwide total of $18.1 million.

The film made $1.45 million from 2,472 theaters on its first day, including $200,000 from Thursday night previews. It went on to debut to $3.7 million, topping the box office. In its second weekend, the film made $1.8 million, remaining in first place. It made $799,770 in its third weekend (including $966,470 over the four-day American Thanksgiving weekend) and was dethroned the following weekend by newcomer The Croods: A New Age.

The film became available via video-on-demand on December 3, in its fourth weekend, and was the top-rented film on FandangoNow, fourth on Google Play, and sixth on Apple TV. It also made $474,610 from 1,502 theaters over that weekend.

=== Critical response ===
On the review aggregator website Rotten Tomatoes, the film has an approval rating of 84% based on 251 reviews, with an average rating of 6.9/10. The website's critics consensus reads, "An entertaining slasher with a gender-bending, body-swapping twist, this horror-comedy juggles genres with Freaky fun results." On Metacritic, the film has a weighted average score of 67 out of 100 based on 39 critics, indicating "generally favorable" reviews. Audiences polled by CinemaScore gave the film an average grade of B− on an A+ to F scale, while PostTrak reported 77% of audience members gave the film a positive score, with 54% saying they would definitely recommend it.

Ryan Larson, of Consequence of Sound, gave the film an A−, saying that "with an incredible supporting cast and two engaging leads, Freaky is an out and out blast that finds Landon inching closer and closer to slasher masters like Wes Craven and John Carpenter." Peter Travers, reviewing the film for ABC News, wrote: "Not every joke or jolt hits the mark. But thanks to Landon's clever twists and go-for-broke performances from Vaughn and Newton, you'd be hard pressed to find a better way to party on the scariest date on the calendar than with this Freaky Friday the 13th."

Heather Wixson, of Daily Dead, gave the film 4.5 out of 5, saying that "Freaky is easily one of the best supernatural slashers to come along in this era of modern horror, that perfectly blends together horror, humor, and heart seamlessly." Writing for The Globe and Mail, Barry Hertz gave the film 3 out of 4 stars, and stated, "Landon is not aiming to break new ground here – only to use well-trod territory for his own gag- and gross-out-happy ends. This is candy-coloured mayhem, bright and snappy and enjoyably wince-inducing in its desire to disgust. And just as Vaughn can easily play both male murderer and winsome teen girl, so, too, can the charming Newton ace her required flips." His Name is Death editor Albert Nowicki considered the movie to be an effective slasher but also praised its "well-directed slapstick" and Vaughn's comedic performance. He believed the film celebrates its queerness and noted: "Written by two openly gay screenwriters, Freaky doesn't stigmatize its characters for their otherness—it erects a monument to it."

== Future ==
In November 2020, Christopher Landon stated that Freaky and Happy Death Day were set in the same world, stating "They def[initely] share the same DNA" stating that Millie Kessler and Tree Gelbman "will bump into each other someday". In 2023, Landon revealed he already conceived a story for the crossover Freaky Death Day. In 2026, Tree Gelbman's portrayer Jessica Rothe stated Freaky Death Day was still under consideration if a third Happy Death Day entered production and added she was very interested in working with Kathryn Newton.

== Awards and nominations ==
Award	Date of ceremony	Category	Nominee(s)	Result	Ref.
Critics' Choice Super Awards	January 10, 2021	Best Actor in a Horror Movie	Vince Vaughn	Won	
Critics' Choice Super Awards	January 10, 2021	Best Actress in a Horror Movie	Kathryn Newton	Nominated	
Critics' Choice Super Awards	January 10, 2021	Best Horror Movie	Freaky	Nominated	
Critics' Choice Super Awards	January 10, 2021	Best Villain in a Movie	Kathryn Newton	Nominated	
HNiD Awards	January 11, 2021	Best Actor	Vince Vaughn	Won	
HNiD Awards	January 11, 2021	Best Soundtrack	Bear McCreary	Nominated	
HNiD Awards	January 11, 2021	Best Special Visual Effects	Bob Shelley, Oliver Taylor and André Freitas	Nominated	
HNiD Awards	January 11, 2021	Best Villain in a Movie	Vince Vaughn	Won	
Saturn Awards	October 26, 2021	Best Horror Film	Freaky	Nominated	
Fangoria Chainsaw Awards	April 18, 2021	Best Lead Performance	Vince Vaughn	Nominated	
Fangoria Chainsaw Awards	April 18, 2021	Best Makeup FX	Alterian Studios	Nominated	
Fangoria Chainsaw Awards	April 18, 2021	Best Screenplay	Michael Kennedy & Christopher Landon	Nominated	
Fangoria Chainsaw Awards	April 18, 2021	Best Supporting Performance	Misha Osherovich	Nominated	
Fangoria Chainsaw Awards	April 18, 2021	Best Wide Release Film	Freaky	Nominated	
MTV Movie & TV Awards	May 16, 2021	Most Frightened Performance	Vince Vaughn	Nominated	

== See also ==
- Body swaps in films
