= Time Cut =

2024 film by Hannah MacPherson

- Release poster
- Directed by: Hannah MacPherson
- Screenplay by: Michael Kennedy; Hannah MacPherson
- Story by: Michael Kennedy
- Produced by: Matt Kaplan; Christopher Landon
- Starring: Madison Bailey; Antonia Gentry; Griffin Gluck
- Cinematography: Tony Mirza
- Edited by: Ken Blackwell; Joe Landauer
- Music by: Anna Drubich
- Production company: ACE Entertainment
- Distributed by: Netflix
- Release date: October 30, 2024
- Running time: 92 minutes
- Country: United States
- Language: English

Time Cut is a 2024 American science fiction slasher film directed by Hannah MacPherson, who co-wrote the screenplay with Michael Kennedy. It stars Madison Bailey, Antonia Gentry, and Griffin Gluck. The plot follows Lucy, a teenage girl who accidentally travels back in time to 2003 and attempts to save her older sister from a masked killer.

Time Cut was released by Netflix on October 30, 2024. It received negative reviews from critics, who unfavorably compared it to 2023's Totally Killer.

== Plot ==
On April 18, 2003, in the small town of Sweetly, Minnesota, high school senior Summer Field unenthusiastically attends the senior class celebration Spring Fling, as her close friends Emmy, Brian, and Val were recently murdered by a serial killer dubbed the Sweetly Slasher. Her lifelong friend Quinn tries to give her an envelope, but Summer brushes him off, and does the same when her recent ex-boyfriend Ethan asks her to dance. While Summer is in a back bathroom, the police are shutting down the party and everyone is rushing out the front. A masked figure lunges at her with a knife, so she escapes out back towards a barn, where he murders her.

Twenty-one years later, high school student and amateur inventor Lucy Field feels largely invisible, as the town and her parents are fixated on the date of Summer's death, the town having been torn apart by the murders. Downtown has been left decrepit, people continue to talk about the unsolved murders, and Lucy accompanies her parents to the small shrine to the victims in front of the barn.

Noticing a light flash from a nearby hay barn, Lucy finds a time machine and accidentally travels back to the year 2003, two days before her sister Summer was murdered by the Slasher. Disoriented by how not rundown Sweetly is, she goes to the high school to consult with her mentor, science teacher Mr. Fleming. Quinn, a local student, overhears her asking about time travel, and insists it is too irresponsible to undertake.

Shortly afterwards, when Quinn is swept up by a wave of students to be this year's victim of the senior prank, Lucy intervenes. She stops the group and sweeps Ethan onto his back. Quinn is initially resentful, but she soon confides in him that she accidentally came from the future via the time machine. Knowing he is good at physics, Lucy enlists his help in refueling it.

When Quinn has to head out to his mall job, Lucy asks for a lift to her house, surprising him, as he did not realize the connection. She is invited in under the guise of helping Summer with her chemistry homework. The house and her parents are very different: it is messy, her parents are easygoing, and Summer and her mother cook together daily. Later, the Slasher murders Val and Brian at the mall, but Lucy's attempt to intervene results in the murder of a security guard who had not originally died.

Summer eventually discovers the truth and works with Lucy and Quinn to save Emmy from the Slasher. At the same time, Lucy discovers that Quinn is in love with Summer, the letter that he had tried to give her being a confession of this. She also discovers that Summer is a lesbian, realizing that a letter she found in her room was from Emmy, and she convinces her to come out and be herself. While Lucy and Quinn steal fuel for the time machine, Summer attends the dance where she publicly confesses her love for Emmy. The Slasher attacks Summer in the barn, but Lucy and Quinn save her life.

The Slasher is revealed to be a future Quinn from an alternate timeline, having been driven insane by the rejection and bullying that he had endured. He had traveled back in time, seeking revenge on Summer and her friends, inadvertently creating Lucy as a result of the hole that Summer's death had left in their parents' lives. Lucy transports herself and the future Quinn back to 2024, where she electrocutes and stabs him to death.

Discovering that she does not exist in this new, better timeline, Lucy decides to return to 2003 to live her life in the past with Summer and Quinn, landing an internship with NASA similar to the one that she got in her original timeline. In her personal statement, Lucy displays a more optimistic outlook on life than she did originally.

== Cast ==
- Madison Bailey as Lucy Field, Summer's younger sister
- Antonia Gentry as Summer Field, Lucy's older sister who died in 2003
- Michael Shanks as Gil Field, Lucy and Summer's father
- Griffin Gluck as Quinn, a physics genius and Lucy's helper
- Megan Best as Emmy Golden, Summer's girlfriend
- Samuel Braun as Ethan Myers, Summer's ex-boyfriend
- Sydney Sabiston as Val Vaughn
- Kataem O'Connor as Brian Palmer
- Rachael Crawford as Kendra Field, Lucy and Summer's mother
- Summer H. Howell as Jessica

== Production ==
In May 2021, it was announced that a script written by Michael Kennedy and Sono Patel would be directed by Hannah MacPherson. (Note: The final credits by the Writers Guild of America give Sono Patel "additional literary material (not on-screen)", along with JT Billings and Ian Shorr.) Madison Bailey and Antonia Gentry were the first cast members announced to star in the film. Additional cast members were revealed when a 2024 release was announced.

Filming was to take place in Winnipeg, Manitoba, Canada between June 21 and July 28, 2021. Principal photography eventually began on July 6 and ended in August, with cinematography work done by Tony Mirza and Halyna Hutchins before Hutchins worked on her final film, Rust (2024). The production of Time Cut used unloaded guns, yet the firearms safety personnel still followed standard safety precautions to ensure the entire cast and crew was aware.

== Release ==
Time Cut was released on Netflix on October 30, 2024.

== Reception ==
On the review aggregator website Rotten Tomatoes, 26% of 34 critics' reviews are positive, with an average rating of 4.1/10. Metacritic, which uses a weighted average, assigned the film a score of 36 out of 100, based on 9 critics, indicating "generally unfavorable" reviews.

Benjamin Lee of The Guardian gave the film 2/5 stars, writing, "Like the dreadful second Happy Death Day film, there's far too much focus on the particulars of time travel, as if we expect or want a film like this to be rooted in any actual science, and like the many high-concept horrors that we've seen of late, there's a laziness to how it handles the simple slasher beats." RogerEbert.com's Brian Tallerico gave it 1/4 stars, writing, "the accusations that this film follows in [Totally Killer]'s time-jumping footsteps are inevitable. But this film's failure can't be laid at the feet of a superior one. If that movie never existed—heck, if time jump movies in general never existed—this would still be a bad movie." The A.V. Club's Matt Donato gave it a C− grade, calling it "a glancing blow of a snoozy slasher far more interested in being a 2000s rewound comedy, meeting somewhere in the unenthusiastic middle."

The Hindu's Mini Anthikad-Chhibber was more positive, writing, "The fun thing about Time Cut is it does not take itself too seriously like some other weighty incursions into the fabric of the space-time continuum." Empire's Ben Travis gave it 3/5 stars, calling it "a passable addition to the slash-up genre – acceptable Halloween fare for the fright-challenged, or anyone with a soft spot for the music of Hilary Duff." Dais Johnston of Inverse wrote, "Time Cut is a movie that fundamentally understands what makes time travel stories interesting. It's not the science behind them, but how the characters react to the circumstances they find themselves in. It doesn't matter how Lucy learns she might cease to exist, but how she chooses to spare her own life or her sister's. Keeping the story simple allows every scene to glow and crackle like the time machine's lasers or a 2003 modem."
