= Israel Broussard =

American actor

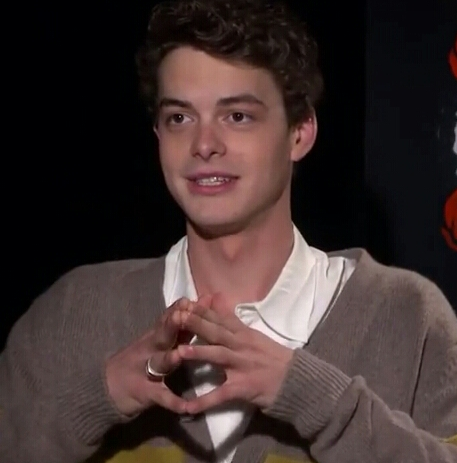
- Broussard in 2019
- Born: Isaiah Israel Adams; August 22, 1994 (age 32); Gulfport, Mississippi, U.S.
- Occupation: Actor
- Years active: 2010–present

Isaiah Israel Broussard (/ˈbruːsɑːrd/; born August 22, 1994) is an American actor. He made his film debut in the comedy-drama Flipped, and is known for his roles in the crime film The Bling Ring (2013), the drama Perfect High (2015), the thriller H8RZ (2015), the comedy Good Kids (2016), the slasher film Happy Death Day (2017) as well as its 2019 sequel Happy Death Day 2U, and the teen romance film To All the Boys I've Loved Before (2018).

== Early life ==
Isaiah Israel Adams was born in Gulfport, Mississippi, to Angela (née Clapp), a Mary Kay cosmetics consultant, and Lawrence Clayton Adams (1957–1999), who died when Broussard was four. He was raised in nearby Saucier by his mother and stepfather, Gil Broussard, a computer programmer, who later adopted him and his older sister. He has one younger half-brother from his mother's remarriage.

== Career ==
Broussard began his career with small roles as Garrett Einbinder in the comedy-drama Flipped (2010) and Josh in the comedy The Chaperone (2011), before landing the role of Marc Hall in Sofia Coppola's crime film The Bling Ring (2013). He earned praise for his performance in the latter, which was based on the real-life group of teenage burglars, the Bling Ring.

In 2013, Broussard appeared alongside Lily Collins in the music video for M83's "Claudia Lewis", directed by Bryce Dallas Howard. He then portrayed Carson Taft in the Lifetime film Perfect High (2015). The following year, Broussard starred as Mike "Spice" Jennings in the comedy film Good Kids.

Broussard starred as Carter Davis, opposite Jessica Rothe, in Christopher Landon's slasher film Happy Death Day (2017). In 2018, he had a leading role in the alien invasion thriller Extinction, and played Josh Sanderson in the film adaptation of Jenny Han's young adult romance novel To All the Boys I've Loved Before, the latter directed by Susan Johnson. Broussard then reprised his role as Carter Davis in the 2019 sequel Happy Death Day 2U.

== Controversies ==
On August 21, 2018, days after the release of To All the Boys I've Loved Before, a collection of tweets by Broussard resurfaced that were insensitive and racist, including on the subject of the Black Lives Matter movement. For instance, after the 2011 Tōhoku earthquake and tsunami, Broussard tweeted: "Dogs can sense earthquakes. Too bad Japan ate them all." In addition, he was also found to have liked tweets promoting Sandy Hook conspiracy theories and Islamophobic tweets. He released an apology on Twitter, stating, "I am dedicated to becoming a more informed and educated version of myself."

== Filmography ==
Key
†	Denotes films that have not yet been released

=== Film ===
Year	Title	Role	Notes
2010	Flipped	Garrett Einbinder	
2011	The Chaperone	Josh	
2013	The Bling Ring	Marc Hall	
2014	Earth to Echo	Cameron	
2015	H8RZ	Jack Stanton	
2015	Jack of the Red Hearts	Robert Adams	
2016	Good Kids	Mike "Spice" Jennings	
2017	Happy Death Day	Carter Davis	
2017	Say You Will	Bobby	
2018	Extinction	Miles	
2018	To All the Boys I've Loved Before	Josh Sanderson	
2019	Happy Death Day 2U	Carter Davis	
2021	Fear of Rain	Caleb	
2025	Find Your Friends	Will	

=== Television ===
Year	Title	Role	Notes
2010	Romantically Challenged	Justin Thomas	2 episodes
2013	Sons of Anarchy	Joey Noone	Episode: "Sweet and Vaded"
2015	Perfect High	Carson Taft	Television film
2016	Fear the Walking Dead	James McCalister	2 episodes
2019	Into the Dark	Spencer	Episode: "All That We Destroy"

=== Music videos ===
Year	Title	Artist(s)
2013	"Claudia Lewis"	M83
