= Jeff Lima =

Jeff Lima may refer to:

- Jeff Lima (rugby league)
- Jeff Lima (actor)
