= Stealing Cars =

- Film poster
- Directed by: Bradley J. Kaplan
- Written by: Will Aldis; Steve Mackall
- Produced by: Rachel Winter; Dan Keston; Joe Newcomb
- Starring: Emory Cohen; Mike Epps; Paul Sparks; Felicity Huffman; William H. Macy; Al Calderon; Heather Lind; John Leguizamo
- Cinematography: Martin Ahlgren
- Edited by: Jarrett Fijal; Sabine Hoffmann; Adam Zuckerman
- Music by: Phil Mossman
- Production company: Leverage Management
- Release date: June 13, 2015 (LA Film Festival)
- Running time: 94 minutes
- Country: United States
- Language: English

Stealing Cars is a 2015 American crime drama film directed by Bradley J. Kaplan, written by Will Aldis and Steve Mackall, and starring Emory Cohen, Mike Epps, Felicity Huffman, William H. Macy, and John Leguizamo. It was premiered at Los Angeles Film Festival on June 13, 2015.

== Plot ==
After committing a number of crimes, including vehicular theft, Billy Wyatt is placed in a juvenile detention camp. He quickly befriends Nathan Stein, a sickly inmate, and due to his charisma and intelligence, earns the respect of several other inmates, including the feared Carlos and the hulking Jerome Timmons 'J.T.' Dye. However, his indifference and disrespect to those trying to rehabilitate him put Billy into conflict with the camp's director, Montgomery De La Cruz, and the abusive head guard, Conrad Sean Lewis. He also bonds with Tina Simms, a recovering drug addict who serves as the camp's nurse, and Emmit Till, the local sheriff, who appears to genuinely want to help him.

Billy goes on to organize the camp's community construction project for the year, a drive-in movie theater. Following the completion of the theater, he is approached by Montgomery about being moved from manual labor to taking care of the director's personal belongings, including a prized automobile. To convince Billy to work for him, he brings up the death of Billy's father Philip in a vehicular accident, which Billy blames himself for. Montgomery discloses that he too lost his father under tragic circumstances. Seeing Billy in his new position causes most of the inmates to turn against him and Nathan is beaten and tied to a basketball post.

Upon learning that Montgomery lied about his father's death, Billy beats him and accompanied by Nurse Simms, steals his car in an effort to transport Nathan to a hospital. Montgomery attempts to stop him from leaving, but Billy receives support from his fellow inmates and Conrad and Sheriff Till refuse to prevent his escape. Upon dropping Nathan and Nurse Simms off at the hospital, he drives back to his home where he makes amends with his mother Kimberly before the police recapture him.

== Cast ==
- Emory Cohen as Billy Wyatt
- John Leguizamo as Montgomery De La Cruz
- Paul Sparks as Conrad Sean Lewis
- Heather Lind as Nurse Tina Simms
- Mike Epps as Sheriff Emmit Till
- Al Calderon as Nathan Stein
- Jeff Lima as Carlos
- Leopold Manswell as Jerome Timmons 'J.T.' Dye
- Felicity Huffman as Kimberly Wyatt
- William H. Macy as Philip Wyatt
- Grace Van Patten as Maggie Wyatt
- Deema Aitken as Earl
- Tariq Trotter as Lionel McWorthers
- Chance Kelly as Coach Jimmy Carmichael
- David H. Holmes as Ollie

== Release ==
The film premiered at the Los Angeles Film Festival on June 13, 2015.
