= Michael Kennedy (screenwriter) =

American screenwriter

- Born: Michael T. Kennedy; August 30, 1980 (age 46); Cleveland, Ohio, U.S.
- Occupations: Screenwriter and Producer
- Known for: Freaky (2020); Heart Eyes (2025)

Michael Kennedy is an American screenwriter and producer. He is known for his collaborations with Christopher Landon, including the slasher films Freaky (2020), Time Cut (2024), Heart Eyes (2025), and Heart Eyes 2 (2028).

He is recognized for writing high concept slashers that blend horror and comedy. His work is often associated with gay horror, most notably It's a Wonderful Knife (2023) which was nominated for Outstanding Film at the 2024 GLAAD Awards.

== Filmography ==
Year	Title	Writer	Producer	Notes
2020	Freaky	Yes	No	
2023	It's a Wonderful Knife	Yes	Yes	Nomination 35th GLAAD Media Awards, Outstanding Film
2024	Time Cut	Yes	No	Story & Screenplay
2025	Heart Eyes	Yes	Executive Producer	
2027	Survive: The Game	Yes	Executive Producer	
2028	Heart Eyes 2	Yes	Executive Producer	Story, Based on Characters Created by
