= Affection (2025 film) =

2025 film by BT Meza

- Directed by: BT Meza
- Written by: BT Meza
- Produced by: Bay Dariz; BT Meza; Austin Walk; JP Ouellette
- Starring: Jessica Rothe; Joseph Cross; Julianna Layne
- Edited by: David Gallegos
- Music by: Daniel Berk
- Production companies: Superconductive; Minutehand Pictures; Circa 1888
- Distributed by: Brainstorm Media
- Release dates: October 7, 2025 (Screamfest); May 8, 2026 (United States)
- Running time: 89 minutes
- Country: United States

Affection is a 2025 American science fiction horror film written and directed by BT Meza. It stars Jessica Rothe as a woman who wakes up in an unfamiliar house with a man (Joseph Cross) and a young girl who claim to be her husband and daughter. However, she does not recognize them. The film premiered on October 7, 2025, at the Screamfest Horror Film Festival in Los Angeles and had a limited release in the US on May 8, 2026.

== Plot ==
The film opens with a severely injured woman (Jessica Rothe) waking up on a dark rural road after a car crash. After a violent convulsion, she stumbles into the woods, only to be struck down by a speeding jeep.

She awakens in a secluded farmhouse next to a man she does not recognize. Downstairs, the man claims to be her husband, Bruce (Joseph Cross), and introduces a young girl, Alice (Julianna Layne), as their daughter. The woman attacks Bruce in a panic but relents due to Alice's terror. Bruce explains that she is his wife, Ellie, and that a traumatic accident left her with severe brain damage. He claims her violent seizures trigger "memory resets" that warp her reality into false personas—specifically her current fixation that she is "Sarah Thompson," a computer science graduate from Maine with a completely different family. To aid her recovery, Bruce keeps them isolated on a remote property with no outside communication.

While showering, Ellie discovers a strange, surgical wound at the base of her neck, which she initially dismisses. Her paranoia deepens when she explores the woods and finds a living, struggling figure wrapped tightly in a plastic body bag, though she is unable to see the person's face. Terrified, Ellie tells Alice about the "monster" hidden in the woods, deeply traumatizing the young girl. Following this discovery, Ellie inspects Alice and uncovers an identical surgical wound on the child's neck.

The tension breaks when Bruce snaps and tries to kill Ellie, but their struggle is interrupted by Alice. Taking advantage of the distraction, Ellie flees into the woods and stumbles upon Bruce's locked barn. Inside, she discovers an automated bio-synthetic laboratory containing cloning incubation units. She finds an instructional terminal featuring a series of archived video files labeled with a bizarre "Play Me" instruction.

The reality is revealed: the real Ellie and Alice died in a car accident years prior. Unable to cope, Bruce has spent years using a "human generator" to print physical copies of his family from scratch, downloading his late wife's digitized consciousness into the clones via hardline data cords. The protagonist we have been tracking is Clone #163. The "Sarah Thompson" identity is not a real person, but a massive data glitch inside the mainframe's corrupted archive. The violent seizures are the result of terminal "Total Identity Rejection." The breathing figure wrapped in plastic in the woods—and the woman hit by the jeep in the opening sequence—was actually Clone #162, a prior failed iteration that escaped before breaking down. Bruce marks Alice for termination because she witnessed him attempting to kill her mother, and because her profound trauma regarding the "monster" in the woods proves she is another failed, emotionally broken clone.

Bruce tracks Ellie to the lab and kills her. Believing she is permanently disposed of, he buries her in a mass grave out back and returns to the house to kill Alice. Bruce then programs the mainframe to prepare the next batch of clones, before walking out into the cornfield to weep over his actions.

While Bruce is away grieving, the heavily deteriorating, zombie-like Clone #163 claws her way out of the dirt grave. Sneaking into the laboratory completely unseen, she watches Bruce return and finalize his computer sequences. Once Bruce leaves the barn to wait for the new bodies, Clone #163 utilizes the technical coding instincts embedded by her "Sarah Thompson" data glitch. She accesses the master computer and completely overwrites the next queued iteration, Clone #164, with her own current memories of the past week. Once the sequence is locked in, she leaves the barn and begins a long, agonizingly slow walk back toward the main house.

Bruce returns to the laboratory when the gestation cycles finish, cleaning the newborn Ellie and Alice clones before putting them to bed in the house. He revives them both using a high-voltage neural activation tool. After comforting Alice and putting her to sleep, he revives the new Ellie (Clone #164). Playing dumb to survive, she pretends to have suffered a memory wipe, though she implicitly hints at her hidden awareness by addressing Bruce strictly by his first name instead of "husband." Believing his experiment is finally a perfect success, Bruce has sex with her; we see Ellie's face as she silently endures it.

Later, Bruce walks back to the lab, leaving his car behind at the house. Ellie seizes the opportunity to check on Alice, pack the vehicle with flammable liquids, and drive down to the facility. Inside the lab, Bruce is preparing to print a clone of himself purged of his agonizing memories, intending to self-terminate afterwards, when he notices the overwritten Clone #164 file on the interface. Bruce leaves the room to investigate. Ellie pulls up to the lab moments later, believing Bruce is absent. As she begins dousing the facility in fuel, complaining that Bruce should have just grieved like a normal person, Bruce suddenly emerges and confronts her. He catches her off guard, overpowers her, and knocks her unconscious with his activation weapon.

Concurrently, the dying Clone #163 finally completes her slow walk and breaches the main house. Inside, Alice wakes up to find her flashlight's batteries have drained after being left on overnight. While searching for replacements, she is cornered by the zombie-like Clone #163. The chase spills out into the neighboring cornfield, converging precisely where Bruce has dragged the unconscious new Ellie to bury her alive in the mass grave.

Clone #164 awakens and fights Bruce. Just as he gains the upper hand, the decaying Clone #163 emerges from the stalks, grabs Bruce from behind then drags him down into the grave pit. Seizing the moment, Clone #164 sets the pit ablaze, burning Bruce and her failed predecessor alive. She reunites with Alice in the corn.

The two drive away from the burning homestead together. Back in the untouched corner of the automated barn laboratory, an unmonitored countdown finishes. Clone #165 emerges from an active gestation unit. Bypassing the need for the manual activation tool due to the rewritten file, she detaches from her pod, steps out into the empty facility, and calls out for "Bruce" into the void as the credits roll.

== Cast ==
- Jessica Rothe as Ellie Carter / Sarah Thompson
- Joseph Cross as Bruce Carter
- Julianna Layne as Alice Carter

== Production and release ==
Affection is the first feature film directed by BT Meza, who also wrote the script. The film was inspired by Meza's childhood experiences of losing his father and being forced to move to an isolated area with his mother's abusive boyfriend. He stated: "It’s about grief, identity, and imagining a version of life that never got to exist, but could have."

The cast was announced in August 2024 on Deadline. According to Rothe, Affection was filmed in a remote area in Bovina, New York. The film relied on practical effects, and Rothe's role required a physically demanding performance, including simulated seizures.

Affection was acquired by Blue Finch Sales in September 2025. It premiered at Screamfest Horror Film Festival in Los Angeles on October 7, 2025, opening night. It has also played at the Brooklyn Horror Film Festival, London FrightFest, and Overlook Film Festival. In February 2026, it was announced that the film had been sold to several distributors, including Brainstorm Media. The film had a limited release in the US on May 8, 2026. It became available to stream online on June 8, 2026.

== Reception ==
Affection has an 80% approval rating among 50 critics on review aggregator Rotten Tomatoes. The site summarizes the reviews as:"A twisted memory play whose labyrinthine structure can be as disorienting for the audience as it is for its heroine, Affection's most lasting impression may be Jessica Rothe's terrific lead performance." Metacritic indicates a "Generally Favorable" score of 73 based on 5 critic reviews.

Dread Central gave the film 4/5, stating that it is "haunting" and "memorable". In a 4 star review, The Guardian praised the actors' performances and said the film explores the theme of people who do evil while believing themselves justified. Bloody Disgusting rated it 3.5/5, calling it "a hidden gem that will connect with your mind, body, and soul." The Hollywood Reporter said it was a highlight of the 2026 Overlook Film Festival and a commendable directorial debut. Collider rated the film 7/10, praising the actors' performances but concluding that the film's pacing and story could have been improved. Polygon said that "the film’s central thrill is experiencing everything through Ellie’s eyes—confused, horrified, and, eventually, more than a little grossed out." Some reviewers compared the film to the work of David Cronenberg and M. Night Shyamalan.

Some reviewers expressed dissatisfaction with the ending, with Certified Forgotten saying that: "the mashup of technology and body horror never quite meshes perfectly with the rest of the movie". Screen Rant praised the mystery presented in the first half of the movie but criticized the second half as disappointing and uninteresting. RogerEbert.com rated it 2.5/4, praising the beginning of the film but criticizing the film's message as convoluted and calling the film an "ordeal, for [Rothe] and for the audience".
