= Good Kids =

- Theatrical release poster
- Directed by: Chris McCoy
- Written by: Chris McCoy
- Produced by: Nicolas Chartier; Andrew Miano; Dominic Rustam; Chris Weitz; Paul Weitz
- Starring: Nicholas Braun; Zoey Deutch; Israel Broussard; Mateo Arias; Dayo Okeniyi; Julia Garner; Ashley Judd
- Cinematography: Jimmy Lindsey
- Edited by: Evan Henke; Amy McGrath
- Music by: Lucian Piane
- Production companies: Compadre Entertainment; Depth of Field; Voltage Pictures
- Distributed by: Vertical Entertainment
- Release date: October 21, 2016 (United States)
- Running time: 86 minutes
- Country: United States
- Language: English

Good Kids is a 2016 American comedy-drama film written and directed by Chris McCoy, and starring Nicholas Braun, Zoey Deutch, Mateo Arias, Israel Broussard, Dayo Okeniyi, Julia Garner and Ashley Judd. It was released in a limited release and through video on demand on October 21, 2016.

== Plot ==
Long-time friends Andy (Braun), Nora (Deutch), "The Lion" (Note: His real name is never given in the film, though the opening scene shows a form with his name as "Lionel Miller.") (Arias), and Mike/"Spice" (Broussard) find themselves at the start of summer break immediately following their high school graduation, with Andy remorsefully noting they were not invited to any graduation party (or any party during high school). All have been accepted to college—Andy to Dartmouth, Nora to Harvard, the Lion to MIT and Spice to Stanford—and have resigned themselves to simply working over the summer.

Andy works as a tennis instructor and has an internet pen pal and crush in India that he hopes to fly in for the summer at the cost of $2000, though his friends doubt she is real. Nora is an ichthyology researcher and has a crush on her older Australian lab colleague, Erland. The Lion is an MMA instructor for children and Spice works as a kitchenhand. When the Lion is invited by the older cousin of a student to a house party at "The Point," an ultra-exclusive gated community, the group decides to experience everything they forwent during their high school years. Andy wants to gain some sexual "experience" before his crush visits, the Lion wishes to experiment with drugs, Nora wants to experience having a boyfriend, and Spice wants "release."

The group attends the party and quickly gains popularity by dint of their various talents (Spice cooking a soufflé, Andy mouth-catching food thrown from any distance, and the Lion teaching tai chi while smoking marijuana). Nora's crush also happens to be at the party and, after flirting and kissing, they agree to hang out later in the week. Andy sleeps with one of the partygoers—a more sexually experienced girl who happily gives him some pointers after he mentions his inexperience—and Spice's cooking skills result in the group being invited to another party.

Shortly after, Andy, assigned to teach the women's tennis classes for the summer, is propositioned for a private lesson by an older woman, Gabby. She immediately seduces him and pays for the "lesson," and Andy soon finds himself sleeping with most of his clients (all of whom are married and live at "The Point") for money. Nora continues to see Erland, much to the displeasure of Andy who calls Nora out on the age difference (she being 18 and Erland being "30-something"), though Spice quickly points out Andy's hypocrisy (Andy being 18 and Gabby being 42). Nora later sleeps with Erland and the two become a couple. Using the income from his "lessons," Andy transfers $2050 to his pen pal for her flight.

The group's exploits soon take a turn for the worse. The Lion experiments with increasingly heavy drugs, suffers a peyote-induced hallucination in front of a class, and is fired. Nora overhears Erland arranging to "replace" her with another woman, dumps him, and is left emotionally distraught. Andy is forced to flee without his clothes after Gabby's husband returns early during one of their "lessons," and is pulled over by police, detained, and written up (though no charges are filed after Andy helps the arresting officer with his mortgage application). The senior tennis coaches confront Andy, reveal that they have also been sleeping with Gabby, and—fearing that any suspicion will result in them being caught—threaten to fire Andy if he does not cease his "private lessons." One of Andy's sweatbands is later found by Gabby's husband and his inquiries at the tennis club prompt the coaches to fire Andy.

An intoxicated Andy later attempts to rendezvous with a client but drunkenly enters her neighbor's house and encounters one of his former classmates and usual antagonist, Conch (Okeniyi), babysitting. Conch reveals that no one at high school ever disliked Andy (or the group) and that "nobody is ever invited, they just show up, that's what a party is ... you guys were the ones who stayed away," explaining the reason for the group's lack of invitation to any party throughout high school. Conch then cordially invites Andy to the upcoming end-of-summer party.

The group reunites and while Andy, Nora, and the Lion are exhausted after their respective mishaps, Spice, for whom "not much has happened," determines they should go to the end-of-summer party. Andy then receives a phone call from Danya (Tasie Lawrence), his pen pal, who has arrived at the local bus station; she had emailed Andy about her arrival but Andy had not checked his emails since transferring her the money. Andy, the Lion, and Nora drive to pick Danya up and she immediately kisses Andy upon meeting him. Andy and Danya check in to a hotel but he is suddenly overwhelmed by the need to urinate and a burning sensation when urinating, prompting him to leave. He is diagnosed with a yeast infection and prescribed a week-long course of treatment, during which he must abstain from sex. The consequent lack of physical intimacy between Andy and Danya leaves her with the impression that he does not like her.

The group plus Danya attend the end-of-summer party and are eagerly welcomed by their former classmates. Danya notices Andy and Nora's fondness for one another and is consoled by the Lion, leading them to make out until the Lion senses the arrival of the tennis women's husbands (who have deduced that Andy slept with their wives). The husbands confront Andy who expresses his love to Nora, publicly confesses to sleeping with all their wives, and claims his own victimhood (by dint of his yeast infection and sexually inflicted injuries) before being punched to the ground. The Lion arrives and quickly dispatches the husbands using his MMA skills. Spice then rejoins the group after having impressed a girl with his amateur mixology and achieved "release." Two police officers arrive to break up the party, but one recognizes Andy as having previously helped with his mortgage application. The officers decide there is "nothing to see," allow the party to continue, and offer the group a ride home. The partygoers proclaim the group to be legends as they depart.

As summer ends, the group sadly says their goodbyes as they reflect on an amazing summer. The Lion and Danya, having shared a passionate week-long relationship, promise to meet up over the semester break. Nora professes her reciprocal love for Andy, and they passionately kiss and embrace. They all then leave for their respective colleges. Andy later joins the induction line at Dartmouth, is called out to by one of the girls from the first party he attended, mouth catches a gummy bear thrown by her, and confidently introduces himself to other students in the induction line.

== Cast ==
- Nicholas Braun as Andy, a tennis coach and a member of the good kids
- Zoey Deutch as Nora, an ichthyology lab researcher and a member of the good kids
- Israel Broussard as Mike "Spice" Jennings, a cook and a member of the good kids
- Mateo Arias as The Lion, an MMA instructor and a member of the good kids
- Julia Garner as Tinsley
- David Coussins as Erland, one of Nora's lab colleagues
- Virginia Gardner as Emily
- Tasie Lawrence as Danya, Andy's pen pal
- Stephanie Fantauzzi as Zelda
- Kevin Chapman as Brinkley
- Dayo Okeniyi as Conch
- Demián Bichir as Yaco
- Ashley Judd as Gabby, one of Andy's students

== Production ==
On May 12, 2014, it was announced that Israel Broussard, Zoey Deutch, Nicholas Braun, and Craig Roberts joined the cast, and Chris McCoy would direct the film with his script, which appeared on the 2011 Black List. On September 12, 2014, it was announced that Ashley Judd, Demián Bichir, Mateo Arias, Julia Garner, Virginia Gardner and Dayo Okeniyi joined the cast. Principal photography ran from September 12 to October 9, 2014.

== Reception ==
On the review aggregator website Rotten Tomatoes, 33% of 6 critics' reviews are positive.

On The Playlist, Elizabeth MacLeod rated it "C" describing as "an average, uneven, coming-of-age flick with decent performances."
