= H8RZ =

2015 American mystery film

- Video on demand poster
- Directed by: Derrick Borte
- Written by: Derrick Borte; Daniel Forte
- Produced by: Scott Lochmus
- Starring: Israel Broussard; Abigail Spencer; Eliza Bennett; Jeremy Sisto; Malcolm Mays; Cary Elwes
- Cinematography: Brian O'Carroll
- Edited by: Brian Ufberg
- Music by: Tomandandy
- Production companies: Scion Pictures; Storyland Pictures
- Distributed by: Filmbuff
- Release date: July 17, 2015
- Running time: 94 minutes
- Country: United States
- Language: English

H8RZ (pronounced "Haters") is an American mystery drama-thriller film, directed by Derrick Borte, and co-written by Borte and Daniel Forte. It stars Israel Broussard, Abigail Spencer, Jeremy Sisto, Eliza Bennett, Malcolm Mays, and Cary Elwes. The film was released on July 17, 2015 through video on demand.

The film's premise is heavily based on The Usual Suspects, right down to the twist.

== Plot ==
In the aftermath of a mysterious high school "incident" that results in the school burning and leaves a group of students dead, the school's attorney, Laura Sedgewick (Abigail Spencer) questions the only witness alive, a student, Alex (Eliza Bennett), in hopes of protecting the school from any lawsuits. The story is told by Alex's perspective and shown in flashbacks.

Alex meets Jack (Israel Broussard), his girlfriend, Carla (Sophie Curtis), Ricky (Chris Petrovski) and Cameron (Malcolm Mays) at detention after they were caught cheating on a test. They team up to hack into the school and change their failing grades. Jack is hesitant at first, but gives in. Thinking that they've succeeded, they celebrate. Soon after, each one of them becomes blackmailed by an unknown person disguised as "Brittany Tammand." Everyone is confused due to the fact that Brittany Tammand was a student who committed suicide. Ricky reveals that Jack had something to do with her. The unknown person gives each of them different errands. They then proceed to find out who their blackmailer is.

Meanwhile, in present time, Jack is seen at the hospital severely burned. He repeatedly says "Brittany," leaving his parents confused. Reverting into the backstory, they soon discover that the blackmailer is their own science teacher, Faustin. He had witnessed Cameron hacking into the school computer. He threatens them to get him a specific amount of money at any cost or else he would tell the police. The group becomes stressed, not knowing how to get the money. Ricky considers telling the authorities, but his family is forced to move back to Russia. Feeling pressured, Carla considers overdosing on pills.

Alex discovers a way to steal a half a million dollars. They all team up, once again, to steal money using fake IDs and add all the money to the school account online. Once they obtain all the money needed, they meet their teacher and give it to him in exchange for their freedom. Cameron, still enraged by everything their teacher put them through, confronts him, forcing Faustin to pull out a gun to kill Carla and Cameron. Jack is also shot, but is still alive. Laura threatens Alex to never speak of the incident again and to move far away. Meanwhile, she and the principal go on the school account to discover that all the money the kids had stolen is gone.

Alex then receives a message on her phone that all the money has been deposited into her own account. A video message sent to the principal reveals that Brittany faked her death, and that Jack lied to and used her while he was still with Carla. Carla, later, made the whole school turn against Brittany, which caused Brittany to want to commit suicide. Also, Cameron and Ricky wanted to take advantage of her. The video ends with her saying that these haters will pay for everything they did to her. It becomes clear that there is much more to this story than meets the eye. After putting pieces together from Alex's story, Laura learns that Alex is actually Brittany. The attorney also learns that she stole the money and shot her classmates herself. Meanwhile, Jack dies from his severe wounds at the hospital.

Brittany is seen taking out brown eye contacts revealing her natural blue eyes while leaving in a car, revealing that she faked her identity as Alex to avenge herself. The movie ends with Laura running and yelling after her.

== Cast ==
- Israel Broussard as Jack Stanton
- Eliza Bennett as Alex Thomas / Brittany Tammand
- Sophie Curtis as Carla Peterson
- Abigail Spencer as Laura Sedgwick
- Jeremy Sisto as Mr. Faustin
- Cary Elwes as Principal Donato
- Malcolm Mays as Cameron Harris
- Chris Petrovski as Ricky Romanov

== Release ==
The film was released on video on demand on July 17, 2015 by Filmbuff. The film had a test screening prior to completion at Old Dominion University in Virginia on March 25, 2015.
