= Heart Eyes =

2025 film by Josh Ruben

- Theatrical release poster
- Directed by: Josh Ruben
- Written by: Phillip Murphy; Christopher Landon; Michael Kennedy
- Produced by: Christopher Landon; Greg Gilreath; Adam Hendricks
- Starring: Olivia Holt; Mason Gooding; Gigi Zumbado; Michaela Watkins; Devon Sawa; Jordana Brewster
- Cinematography: Stephen Murphy
- Edited by: Brett W. Bachman
- Music by: Jay Wadley
- Production companies: Spyglass Media Group; Divide/Conquer
- Distributed by: Screen Gems (through Sony Pictures Releasing; North America); Republic Pictures (through Paramount Pictures; International)
- Release date: February 7, 2025
- Running time: 97 minutes
- Country: United States
- Language: English
- Budget: $18 million
- Box office: $33.1 million

Heart Eyes is a 2025 American romantic comedy slasher film directed by Josh Ruben, and written by Phillip Murphy, Christopher Landon and Michael Kennedy. The film stars Olivia Holt and Mason Gooding as coworkers who are mistaken as a couple by a serial killer who hunts couples on Valentine's Day. Gigi Zumbado, Michaela Watkins, Devon Sawa, and Jordana Brewster also star.

Heart Eyes was theatrically released in the United States on February 7, 2025, by Sony Pictures Releasing. It received positive reviews from critics and grossed $33 million on a budget of $18 million. A sequel is scheduled for release in February 2028.

== Plot ==
Each of the past few years on Valentine's Day, a serial killer known as the Heart Eyes Killer, or HEK, has targeted couples in a different American city. On Valentine's Day of the present year, HEK murders two couples in Seattle and a wedding ring engraved with the initials "J.S." is later found at one of the crime scenes.

Ally McCabe, a marketer for a jewelry company who has recently broken up with her boyfriend Collin, is ridiculed for an ad campaign she pitched involving doomed couples, seen as offensive in light of the recent murders. Ally's boss, Crystal, orders her to develop a new campaign with accomplished freelancer Jay Simmonds, whom Ally had encountered at a coffee shop earlier. Jay invites her to dinner that night, suggesting it may give them inspiration for the campaign.

That night at the restaurant, Ally grows hostile after each share their views on love, offending Jay. He leaves and Ally follows, kissing him after she sees Collin approaching with his new girlfriend. HEK observes this from a distance. Ally and Jay reconcile and take a cab to her apartment, where he helps her break in after she realizes she forgot her key. Jay cuts his hand in the process and Ally tends to his wound upstairs, having previously dropped out of medical school. The Heart Eyes Killer attacks them and after a chase, knocks Jay out. Ally is able to flee until the police arrive. Detectives Zeke Hobbs and Jeanine Shaw arrest Jay for the murders, having found him with the killer's mask and weapon.

While questioning Jay at a police station, Hobbs and Shaw point out that his initials match those on the previously found ring and that he was in the same cities during HEK's previous attacks. Ally waits in the lobby with desk officer Fran and IT technician David. The latter asks Ally on a date, but she declines. The power goes out and the Heart Eyes Killer kills Fran and pursues Ally. Shaw confronts the HEK who wounds her and kills Hobbs. Ally rescues Jay and they flee to a drive-in movie theater, where they connect while hiding. The Heart Eyes Killer slaughters several moviegoers, leading the duo to confront him. In the scuffle, Ally and Jay kill him with his own weapon and unmask him but don't recognize him. They are tended to by an ambulance until Shaw arrives. She offers Jay a ride, which he accepts.

At home, Ally realizes she has fallen in love with Jay and goes to find him, but the Heart Eyes Killer reveals that Jay is being held at a chapel and will be killed unless she comes alone. Ally arrives and the Heart Eyes Killer is revealed to be David and Jeanine Shaw, secretly a married couple, while the deceased third killer was their fanboy and lover Eli, all three motivated by their kink for killing. The wedding ring found by police belonged to David as the engraved initials were Shaw's.

They give Ally a gun with a single round and offer her the choice of killing herself or Jay, but she shoots Shaw instead, hitting Jay in the process. The two couples fight and Jay stabs David in the eye with an arrow, which results in the latter being immolated by melted wax from candles the couple had lit. An enraged Shaw attempts to kill Ally, but Ally stabs her in the neck with a metal straw and pushes her onto the sword of a statue of Saint Valentine, which slowly decapitates her. A badly burned David attacks them, but is killed with his own crossbow by Jay. One year later, Ally has decided to return to medical school and the couple attends a drive-in movie. Jay asks Ally to move in with him, but she declines, instead proposing to him.

In a mid-credits scene, Ally receives a sinister phone call, which is revealed to be a prank by her friend Monica. As she congratulates the couple, the call is cut off.

== Cast ==
- Olivia Holt as Ally McCabe, a pitch designer
- Mason Gooding as Jay Simmonds, a freelance advertiser
- Gigi Zumbado as Monica, Ally's friend
- Michaela Watkins as Crystal Cane; Ally, Jay and Monica's boss
- Devon Sawa as Det. Zeke Hobbs
- Jordana Brewster as Det. Jeanine Shaw
- Yoson An as David, IT tech
- Bronwyn Bradley as Fran, desk officer
- James Gaylyn as Chief Richard Hartley
- Lauren O'Hara as Adeline Garrett
- Ben Black as Collin, Ally's ex
- Chris Parker as Tommy, Crystal's assistant

In addition, the film's director, Josh Ruben has a cameo appearance as a drive-in movie patron.

== Production ==
The film is directed by Josh Ruben and produced by Spyglass Media Group. The script is written by Phillip Murphy, Michael Kennedy, and Christopher Landon.

Murphy developed the film's initial premise after a bad date, before Landon and Kennedy further developed its romantic-comedy elements. Director Josh Ruben said that he wanted the film to commit fully to both its horror and romance rather than treat either genre as a parody.

Filming took place in New Zealand in June 2024. In October, it was announced that Jay Wadley was composing the film's score.

== Release ==
=== Theatrical ===
In June 2024, Republic Pictures acquired worldwide distribution rights outside the United States and Canada to the film. In September 2024, Sony Pictures acquired the North American distribution rights and released it on February 7, 2025.

=== Home media ===
The film was released on digital on March 4. The film was released on April 15 on DVD and Blu-ray.

== Reception ==
=== Box office ===
Heart Eyes grossed $30.4 million in the United States and Canada, and $2.5 million in other territories, for a worldwide total of $32.9 million.

In the United States and Canada, Heart Eyes was released alongside Love Hurts and was projected to gross $7–8 million from 3,102 theaters in its opening weekend. The film made $3.7 million on its first day, including an estimated $1.1 million from Thursday night previews. It went on to debut to $8.3 million, finishing second behind holdover Dog Man. The film underperformed with couples, with only 40% of opening weekend attendees going with a spouse or date, on par with the previous weekend's opener Companion. The following weekend, which coincided with Valentine's Day, the film grossed $9.9 million, an increase of 19% noted as uncommon for horror films, which normally see steep drops in their second weekends. It was released on digital on March 4, 2025, and dropped out of the box office top ten the following weekend.

=== Critical response ===
On the review aggregator website Rotten Tomatoes, 78% of 159 critics' reviews are positive, with an average rating of 6.3/10. The website's consensus reads: "A mixture of gory slasher and sweet rom-com that ingeniously nails both formulas, Heart Eyes serves up a bloody valentine that'll make the heart skip a beat." Metacritic, which uses a weighted average, assigned the film a score of 61 out of 100, based on 28 critics, indicating "generally favorable" reviews. Audiences polled by CinemaScore gave the film an average grade of "B–" on an A+ to F scale, while those surveyed by PostTrak gave it a 68% overall positive score.

=== Viewership ===
According to data from Showlabs, Heart Eyes ranked sixth on Netflix in the United States during the week of May 5–11, 2025.

== Sequel ==
In January 2026, Dread Central reported that Ruben was preparing work for a sequel and that a script had been completed. In April 2026, the sequel was set for a theatrical release on February 11, 2028, with Paramount Pictures, which had handled most international territories on the first film, replacing Screen Gems as the domestic distributor. In September 2026, the sequel was moved up a week to February 4, 2028.
