= Misha Osherovich =

American actor, filmmaker and activist

- Born: Maryland, U.S.
- Education: Montclair State University (BFA)
- Occupation: Actor
- Years active: 2015−present

Misha Osherovich is an American actor, filmmaker, and activist, known for their role as Josh Detmer in the film Freaky.

== Early life ==
Osherovich was born in Maryland, U.S., to Russian Jewish immigrant parents and raised in the Washington, D.C., area.

They attended Island View, a youth residential treatment center in Davis County, Utah, as a teenager, an experience that they have described as abusive and as conversion therapy.

Osherovich graduated with a Bachelor of Fine Arts in Acting from Montclair State University.

== Career ==
Osherovich made their New York stage debut in the off-Broadway production of A Clockwork Orange at New World Stages.

Their television and film credits include roles in the 2019 film The Goldfinch as well as the AMC series NOS4A2. They then co-starred in the horror comedy-film Freaky, released on November 13, 2020. Osherovich wrote and co-produced the short film E.very D.ay. The film addresses Osherovich's struggle with eating disorders as well as covering the topics of mental health and body image.

As of 2022, Osherovich has a troubled-teen industry drama series in the works with Skylar Landsee and television production company Fremantle. It is based on Osherovich's experiences and survival story in tough-love programs.

== Activism ==
Osherovich is an advocate for mental healthcare access for the queer community. Partnering with NEDA (National Eating Disorders Association), Osherovich produced the organization's first social media Pride campaign to advocate for awareness about disordered eating and body image struggles within the LGBTQIA+ community.

Osherovich attended a rally held by Paris Hilton in protest of alleged abuse at Provo Canyon School and programs for troubled teens, and spoke out about their own experience with abuse at a Utah troubled teen facility.

Osherovich opened up more in Them about their experience in the troubled teen industry and why they don't want any other queer person to go through the same experience. Osherovich shared their experience at two facilities, one in Utah and one in Connecticut, and what they experienced in regards to conversion therapy, explaining that queerness and expressions of queerness were considered rebellion for which students would get punished or go to isolation.

== Personal life ==
Osherovich is non-binary and uses they/she pronouns.

== Filmography ==
=== Film ===
Year	Title	Role	Notes	Ref
2015	Never Born	Theron Gray		
2017	The Prey	The Witness		
2019	E.very D.ay	Young Man		
2019	The Goldfinch	Shirley T		
2020	Freaky	Joshua Detmer		
2025	She's The He	Ethan	Nominee for Best Breakthrough Performance – 41st Independent Spirit Awards	

=== Television ===
Year	Title	Role	Notes	Ref
2016-2017	History	Collin	6 episodes	
2019	NOS4A2	Simon	4 episodes	
2021	The Girl in the Woods	Nolan	8 episodes	
2022	The Boulet Brothers' Dragula: Titans	Themself	Guest judge, "Dungeons and Drag Queens Two: Into the Underdark”	
2023	Survival of the Thickest	Billy	2 Episodes	

=== Stage ===
Year	Title	Role	Location	Ref
2017	A Clockwork Orange	Pete	New World Stages	
2019	Decky Does a Bronco	Decky	Royal Family Performing Arts Space	
