= Malcolm Mays =

American actor, musician, and filmmaker (born 1990)

- Born: February 14, 1990 (age 36); Los Angeles, California, United States
- Genres: Hip hop
- Occupations: Rapper, musician, singer, actor, producer, director
- Instruments: Vocals, keyboards, sampler, piano, guitar
- Years active: 2005–present
- Label: Last Monarchy
- Website: malcolmMAYS SoundCloud

Malcolm Michael Mays (born February 14, 1990) is an American actor, musician, and filmmaker. At the age of seventeen, Mays co-directed and produced his own short film, aided by producer Todd Black, Gary Martin of Sony Pictures and others. Mays is a nephew of Stanley "Tookie" Williams, the notorious co-founder of the Crips gang.

== Film career ==
Sony Pictures, Kodak Films, Todd Black, John Singleton, and Denzel Washington, all have played an important role in Mr. Mays’ productions. His film entitled Trouble aimed to shed light on the African American and Latin American (Black vs. Brown) tension in South Central Los Angeles; the place where young Mays was reared. The New York Times found Mr. Mays’ story to be so compelling that they printed a front page article, “Based on a true story,” telling May's story and accomplishments.

Mays starred in the 2013 picture Life of a King, co-starring alongside Cuba Gooding Jr. The film premiered at the Los Angeles Film Festival and Mays was hailed by Variety as a natural and a highlight. Mays was cited in an August 9, 2013 interview of Cuba Gooding Jr. in the Huffington Post as part of the "next generation" of African-American actors. Millennium Entertainment has acquired all U.S. rights to the film.

Mays starred as Gabe in the 2015 sports drama film Southpaw directed by Antoine Fuqua and written by Kurt Sutter. The film stars Jake Gyllenhaal, Forest Whitaker, and Rachel McAdams, and was released on July 24, 2015, by The Weinstein Company.

Mays was cast as a series regular in FX’s drama pilot Snowfall, about the beginnings of the crack cocaine epidemic in Los Angeles in the 80s. Co-written by John Singleton and Eric Amadio and directed by Singleton, Snowfall is set against the infancy of the epidemic and its ultimate radical impact on the culture as we know it. Mays played Kevin Hamilton, Franklin’s (Damson Idris) best friend since childhood. In 2021, Mays was cast as a series regular on the STARZ drama series Power Book III: Raising Kanan, as Kanan’s uncle Lou Lou.

== Music career ==
Malcolm Mays started playing piano at age eleven and is the writer of music heavily influenced by 90's R&B and 18th century poetry. Mays cites broad influences from music, art and film. Influences cited by Mays as inspirations include music from Eric Dolphy and John Coltrane to Rachmaninov and Beethoven, paintings of Caravaggio and Michelangelo, performers such as Sinatra, Prince, Michael Jackson and Quincy Jones, and the poetry of John Keats & James Baldwin. Mays has also cited the voice of Nina Simone and the readings of Maya Angelou and acts such as The Yardbirds, Cream and Jimi Hendrix as major influences.

Mays released his own self-produced tracks titled "Dichotomy" in 2013 and "Ruthless" in 2015. Mays also produced and directed the music videos for each of the tracks, releasing the video for "Ruthless" following the release of the film Southpaw. Both the songs and the videos were received with rave reviews by critics. After released of the second track, "Ruthless". Hip-Hop blog This Song Slaps, cited "Malcolm Mays is one of the most under-appreciated hip hop artists around today. He possesses a flow unmatched, dense lyrical content, and a sense of melody that’s truly uncommon within the world of hip hop music."

Mass Appeal stated of the Mays production of the film for the song "Dichotomy, "The video opens with a scene reminiscent of a biblical baptism before cutting to a ballet-esque twerk session. Throughout the video, Malcolm pauses to reflect on his past, but keeps getting distracted by matters of a more physical nature... Don't get too distracted while watching the video, or you might miss out on depth of Malcolm Mays’ lyrical content. Lines like, “I'm trying to live like you, but the truth is, Lord, you had some daddy issues too,” show that Mays talents extend outside of the world of film." Will.i.am said of the video and song, "its crazy fresh... LOS ANGELES coolness".

== Filmography ==
=== Film ===
Year	Title	Role	Notes
2010	On the Run	Keenan	Short
2013	Life of a King	Tahime	
2014	The Graduate	Graduate	Short
2015	Southpaw	Gabe	
2015	H8RZ	Cameron	
2015	Covers	X	
2016	Love Is All You Need?	Mike Samson	
2019	The Day Shall Come	Farmer X	
2021	A Backyard in Baldwin Hills	Malcolm	Short

=== Television ===
Year	Title	Role	Notes
2017	Rebel	Brim	Recurring cast
2017–18	Snowfall	Kevin Hamilton	Recurring cast: Seasons 1–2
2021	Them	Calvin	Recurring cast
2021–2026	Power Book III: Raising Kanan	Louis "Lou-Lou" Thomas	Main cast
