= It's a Wonderful Knife =

2023 film by Tyler MacIntyre

- Theatrical release poster
- Directed by: Tyler MacIntyre
- Written by: Michael Kennedy
- Produced by: Seth Caplan; Michael Kennedy; Daniel Bekerman
- Starring: Jane Widdop; Jess McLeod; Joel McHale; Katharine Isabelle; William B. Davis; Justin Long
- Cinematography: Nicholas Piatnik
- Edited by: Arndt-Wulf Peemöller
- Music by: Russ Howard III
- Production company: Divide/Conquer
- Distributed by: RLJE Films; Shudder
- Release dates: October 8, 2023 (Beyond Fest); November 10, 2023 (United States)
- Running time: 87 minutes
- Country: United States
- Language: English
- Box office: $1.3 million

It's a Wonderful Knife is a 2023 American Christmas fantasy slasher comedy film directed by Tyler MacIntyre and written by Michael Kennedy. It stars Jane Widdop, Jess McLeod, Joel McHale, Katharine Isabelle, William B. Davis, and Justin Long. It is a spin on the 1946 Christmas film It's a Wonderful Life; however, instead of the lead character recognizing his previous good deeds, the character Winnie discovers how many deaths she has prevented in her town.

The film was released by RLJE Films on November 10, 2023, followed by its streaming release on Shudder on December 1, 2023. It received mixed reviews from critics.

== Plot ==
In the town of Angel Falls, while teenager Winnie Carruthers is celebrating the Christmas season with her family, her father David is called away by his business partner, Henry Waters, the CEO of Waters Industries. With David in tow, Henry attempts to persuade longtime local resident Roger Evans to sign off his house to be demolished to make room for a massive shopping mall, but Roger refuses, as he intends to pass the house on to his granddaughter, Cara, who is Winnie's best friend. Later, a masked assailant known as "the Angel" kills Roger in his home. At a party that night, the Angel murders Cara and nearly kills Winnie's brother Jimmy, but Winnie electrocutes the killer. She then unmasks the Angel, who turns out to be Henry.

One year later, David is now the CEO of Waters Industries. Winnie is still grieving Cara's death, while her family has moved on from the events of the previous year. She attends a Christmas party at her boyfriend Robbie's house, where she befriends a social outcast named Bernie, before discovering that Robbie has been cheating on her with her friend Darla for a year. Distraught, Winnie goes alone to a bridge and, looking up at the aurora lights in the sky, wishes that she had never been born.

Suddenly, the aurora disappears, and the town's power briefly goes out before returning. After the Angel briefly chases Winnie, she learns that the town's sheriff is now Henry's younger brother Buck, who claims he does not recognize her. She is then greeted by Henry, who is now the town mayor. Winnie goes to see her family, who also do not recognize her, and she realizes she has been transported to an alternate reality in which she never existed, meaning that the Angel is still alive and has already killed several more people since the previous year, including Jimmy.

Upset, Winnie goes to Robbie's Christmas party and encounters Bernie, explaining her plight to her, despite her mild disbelief. After narrowly escaping the Angel, Bernie and Winnie deduce that the Angel has been targeting the teenage children of homeowners whose properties Henry wanted to acquire. Winnie decides she needs her father's help to stop Henry and kill him again, and successfully convinces her aunt Gale of her situation.

Winnie tries to convince her father that Henry killed Jimmy, but David refuses to listen to her and demands that she leave. On her way out, Winnie witnesses the killer murdering her mother. The Angel then tries to attack Winnie, Bernie, and Gale, but is knocked out. Winnie unmasks the killer, shocked to find David behind the mask. David regains consciousness and the trio flees. Winnie, Bernie, and Gale kill David after luring him to the movie theater where Bernie works.

As Winnie and Bernie return to the bridge under the aurora lights, Bernie reveals that she was contemplating suicide and that Winnie saved her. Winnie wishes that she was born after all, but nothing happens. She realizes that Henry still poses a danger to the town as mayor, and that he needs to die again before Winnie can return to her original timeline. Winnie and Bernie come across a rally being hosted by Henry where all the attendees appear to be in a trance. The two confront him and accuse him of the deaths of the past year. Henry confirms that he killed Jimmy, and in doing so broke David's spirit and placed him under his control, making him his accomplice. When Henry attacks Winnie, Bernie stabs him to death, breaking his control over the townspeople. As the aurora reappears, Winnie and Bernie kiss.

Winnie wakes up in her bedroom on Christmas morning. She cheerfully greets her family, and her parents apologize for not allowing her to process her trauma. Winnie then rushes over to Bernie's house, but Bernie reveals she still has her memories of their time together in the alternate reality, and they hug before agreeing to celebrate Christmas together.

== Cast ==
- Jane Widdop as Winnie Carruthers
- Joel McHale as David Carruthers
- Justin Long as Henry Waters
- Jess McLeod as Bernie Simon
- Katharine Isabelle as Gale Prescott
- Aiden Howard as Jimmy Carruthers
- Erin Boyes as Judy Carruthers
- Sean Depner as Buck Waters
- Zenia Marshall as Darla Berlin
- Hana Huggins as Cara Evans
- Kiki Faye as Vicki Pepper
- William B. Davis as Roger Evans
- Dimitri Vegas as Pete
- Cassandra Naud as Karen Simmons
- Thomas Nicholson as Wyatt Stone

== Production ==
It's a Wonderful Knife was produced by Divide/Conquer and Seth Caplan in association with Fourth Culture Films. Michael Kennedy spoke of his admiration for Jane Widdop's performance in the television series Yellowjackets prior to shooting the film. He also discussed Justin Long's performance as the town mayor in the film, and how he was channeling a "boomer smarminess" for the role. Principal photography took place in Vancouver from March 20 to April 14, 2023.

== Release ==
It's a Wonderful Knife had its world premiere at Beyond Fest on October 8, 2023, in Los Angeles. It was released in 923 theaters in the United States by RLJE Films on November 10, 2023, and grossed $811,307, with $14,153 in the United Arab Emirates, for a worldwide total of $825,460.

It's a Wonderful Knife began streaming through Shudder on December 1, 2023. The film released on Blu-ray on April 9, 2024.

== Reception ==
On the review aggregator website Rotten Tomatoes, 55% of 80 critics' reviews are positive, with an average rating of 5.6/10. The website's consensus reads: "It's a Wonderful Knife takes an enthusiastic stab at holiday-themed horror-comedy, even if it doesn't cut quite as deep as it should." Metacritic, which uses a weighted average, assigned the film a score of 52 out of 100, based on 14 critics, indicating "mixed or average" reviews.

Chicago Sun-Times's Richard Roeper gave the film a score of two and half out of four, writing "As you'd expect, It's a Wonderful Knife is filled with blood-spattered twists on holiday movie tropes. Unfortunately, there are few surprises and only a handful of genuine scares, and the film suffers from subpar lighting and occasionally clunky editing. It's a Knife in need of some sharpening". J. Kim Murphy of Variety wrote "MacIntyre's direction is unfussy enough for It's a Wonderful Knife to recover from such awkward moments. But the frequent stabs at horror are just as easily forgotten. The genre slant promised by the title seems to be less of a tonal responsibility than an excuse to abruptly break out into the occasional suspense set piece". He ended his review with "The film is defined by an overruling superfluousness — it's the sort of thing people might be satisfied with watching from the corner of their eyes while wrapping presents".

Meagan Navarro of Bloody Disgusting scored the film three out of five and said "MacIntyre's latest may not quite seamlessly nail its high concept genre mashup, but with some outstanding performances and a sweet gooey emotional center, it effectively tugs at your heartstrings and captures the spirit of Christmas". Robert Daniels writing for RogerEbert.com gave a score of three and half out of four, "It's A Wonderful Knife has plenty of attributes—charm, blood, and angst—that should fit right in at any family holiday gathering".

== Awards & Nominations ==
Nominee, Outstanding Film, 35th GLAAD Media Awards.

Winner, Best Film To Watch With A Crowd, 2023 Toronto After Dark Film Festival.

Winner, After Dark Spirit Award, 2023 Toronto After Dark Film Festival.

Winner, Matea Pasaric, Best Costume Design for a Motion Picture, 2024 Leo Awards.

Nominee, Jess McLeod, Best Supporting Performance in a Motion Picture, 2024 ACTRA Awards.

Nominee, Erin Boyes, Best Supporting Performance in a Motion Picture, 2024 Leo Awards.
