= The Chaperone (2011 film) =

Film by Stephen Herek

- Official film poster
- Directed by: Stephen Herek
- Written by: S.J. Roth
- Produced by: David Calloway; Nancy Hirami; Todd Lewis
- Starring: Paul Levesque; Yeardley Smith; Ariel Winter; Kevin Corrigan; José Zúñiga; Kevin Rankin; Enrico Colantoni; Annabeth Gish; Israel Broussard
- Cinematography: Kenneth Zunder
- Edited by: Michel Aller
- Music by: Jim Johnston
- Production company: WWE Studios
- Distributed by: Samuel Goldwyn Films
- Release date: February 18, 2011
- Running time: 103 minutes
- Country: United States
- Language: English
- Budget: $6.3 million
- Box office: $279,147

The Chaperone is a 2011 American crime comedy film directed by Stephen Herek, and also produced by WWE Studios. It stars Paul Levesque, Yeardley Smith, Ariel Winter, Kevin Corrigan, José Zúñiga, Kevin Rankin, Enrico Colantoni, and Israel Broussard. It is about getaway driver Ray Bradstone (Paul Levesque) who bails out of a robbery and decides to focus on being a better dad by chaperoning his teenage daughter's school field trip.

== Plot ==
Ray Bradstone, a talented getaway driver, is determined to go straight, be a better parent to his daughter Sally, and make amends with his ex-wife, Lynne. As Ray struggles to find honest work, he agrees to take one last job with his old bank-robbing crew, led by Phillip Larue.

Ray changes his mind at the last second, choosing to chaperone a field trip with Sally's class and leaving the thieves without an escape. The robbery is a disaster and now Ray must deal with an enraged Larue and his thugs while driving a school bus full of kids.

== Cast ==
- Triple H as Raymond "Ray" Bradstone
- Ariel Winter as Sally Bradstone
- Kevin Corrigan as Phillip "The Cat" Larue
- Jose Zuniga as Officer Carlos Flynt
- Annabeth Gish as Lynne Bradstone
- Yeardley Smith as Miss Miller
- Kevin Rankin as Meyer "Goldy" Stenz
- Enrico Colantoni as Dr. Marvin Etman
- Ashley Taylor as Meredith
- Israel Broussard as Josh
- Darren O'Hare as Augie
- Lucy Webb as Dr. Marjorie
- Jake Walker as Ted
- Cullen Foster Chaffin as Simon
- Taylor Faye Ruffin as Brenda
- Conner Ann Waterman as Tracy
- Camille Bourgeois as Bill
- Nick Gomez as Nick The Bus Driver
- J. D. Evermore as Theodore Del Muniz
- Alec Rayme as Kevin
- Billy Slaughter as Father

== Development ==
WWE announced that filming in New Orleans started in June 2010.

== Reception ==
The Chaperone met with negative reviews from critics. Review aggregation website Rotten Tomatoes gives the film a score of 29% based on 17 reviews, with an average rating of 3.7/10. Metacritic gives a score of 33/100 based on reviews from 11 critics.

Eric Kohn of Indiewire graded the film a C−, saying that it had flat direction and a mediocre script and said "As a vehicle for WWE champ Paul "Triple H" Levesque, it's haplessly stuck on cruise control." Nick Schager of Slant Magazine gave it half-a-star out of four, criticizing the script, direction and characters saying that "this hulk-with-a-heart-of-gold fable embraces banalities with a vigor matched only by its lack of imagination."

== Awards ==
Year	Award	Category	Recipient(s)	Result
2012	Young Artist Awards	Best Performance in a Feature Film: Leading Young Actress	Ariel Winter	Nominated
