= Lily & Kat =

- Theatrical release poster
- Directed by: Micael Preysler
- Written by: Micael Preysler; Megan Platts
- Produced by: Garen Barsegian
- Starring: Hannah Murray; Jessica Rothe; Jack Falahee; Mimi Gianopulos
- Cinematography: Todd Antonio
- Edited by: Teel Rex Lowry
- Music by: Glowbug
- Production company: Garen Productions
- Distributed by: Mance Media
- Release dates: February 14, 2015 (TIFF Next Wave); March 20, 2015
- Running time: 89 minutes
- Country: United States
- Language: English

Lily & Kat is a 2015 American coming-of-age comedy-drama film, written and directed by Micael Preysler.

After its premiere at the TIFF Next Wave, Mance Media released the film theatrically and on video on demand on March 20, 2015 in the United States.

== Plot ==
Set in New York City, the film follows a naive fashion school graduate named Lily who finds her world turned upside down when her reckless best friend Kat announces she’s moving away to London in a matter of days. At a Lower East Side art gallery opening the next night, they meet the enigmatic rising artist Henri, who Lily quickly takes a liking to. With less than seven days left together and a new guy coming between them, Lily and Kat will find their “unbreakable” friendship put to the test.

== Cast ==
- Jessica Rothe as Lily
- Hannah Murray as Kat
- Jack Falahee as Henri
- David Wilson Barnes as Ben
- Mimi Gianopulos as Agatha
- Scott Evans as Nick
