= Jack, Jules, Esther and Me =

- Directed by: Daniel Poliner
- Written by: Daniel Poliner
- Produced by: Daniel Poliner, Megan Poliner
- Starring: Jessica Rothe Julie Lauren; Harrison Chad Jeff Lima; Alexander Flores
- Cinematography: Adam Miller, Djuna Wahlrab
- Edited by: Eric Rothman
- Distributed by: FilmBuff
- Release date: October 24, 2013 (Austin Film Festival)
- Running time: 106 minutes
- Country: United States
- Language: English

Jack, Jules, Esther and Me is a 2013 coming of age independent film directed by Daniel Poliner. This comedy centers on four young high schoolers on their last weekend before heading off to college and the scheme to win a girl's heart. The film world premiered at Austin Film Festival where programmer Bears Fonté called it "an uplifting stumble through love in the time of awkward."

== Cast ==
- Harrison Chad as Dougie
- Alexander Flores as Luis
- Alice Lee as Esther
- Jeff Lima as Carlos
- Jessica Rothenberg as Jules
- Aaron Sauter as Jack

== Release ==
Jack, Jules, Esther and Me was released on VOD by FilmBuff on December 17, 2013. The Daily Quirk called the film "an irresistible romantic comedy that will tug at your heartstrings whether you’re a seasoned indie fan or a strictly mainstream movie spectator." Greg Morris of The Word reviewed the film as "complex, intense, brilliant. It’s audacious humor reflects the sagacious wit of its director-writer."

== Production notes ==
Writer/director Daniel Poliner financed the film through fees collected as an SAT prep tutor for privileged kids in New York City. He said the movie is loosely based on his "most memorable students".
