= Happy Death Day 2U =

2019 American science fiction horror film

- Theatrical release poster
- Directed by: Christopher Landon
- Written by: Christopher Landon
- Based on: Characters by Scott Lobdell
- Produced by: Jason Blum
- Starring: Jessica Rothe; Israel Broussard; Suraj Sharma; Steve Zissis
- Cinematography: Toby Oliver
- Edited by: Ben Baudhuin
- Music by: Bear McCreary
- Production company: Blumhouse Productions
- Distributed by: Universal Pictures
- Release date: February 13, 2019 (United States)
- Running time: 100 minutes
- Country: United States
- Language: English
- Budget: $9 million
- Box office: $64.6 million

Happy Death Day 2U is a 2019 American science fiction black comedy slasher film written and directed by Christopher Landon. A sequel to Happy Death Day (2017), it stars Jessica Rothe, Israel Broussard, Suraj Sharma, and Steve Zissis. The film again follows Tree Gelbman (Rothe), now trapped in the same time loop of a different iteration of her world. Jason Blum again serves as a producer through his Blumhouse Productions company.

The film was released in the United States on February 13, 2019, by Universal Pictures. It received mixed reviews from critics and grossed $64.6 million worldwide.

== Plot ==
One day after the events of Happy Death Day, college student Ryan Phan wakes up in his car on September 19. Returning to his dorm room, he walks in on his roommate Carter and Carter's girlfriend, Tree.

Ryan resumes work on an experimental quantum reactor with fellow students Samar and Dre to slow down time. After Dean Bronson shuts down the project for causing several power outages and not producing practical applications so far, Ryan is murdered by someone dressed as school mascot Babyface and wakes up again on the 19th.

Tree explains her experience reliving September 18th, and she and Carter agree to help Ryan. They learn the reactor inadvertently created the loop. The masked killer tracks Ryan down, but Tree unmasks him to reveal another Ryan. The second one insists the original must die for the loop to close. Terrified, Ryan activates the reactor, releasing an energy pulse that knocks everyone unconscious.

Tree wakes up in Carter's room on September 18 and relives her original time loop, but she soon realizes things are different after discovering that Carter is now dating Danielle. Ryan believes the reactor caused Tree to drift into another dimension. When she learns her mother is still alive in this new reality, she wants to stay.

That night, Tree goes to the hospital to intercept serial killer John Tombs before he escapes, but she is confronted by a police officer. The killer kills the officer, and Tree runs into Lori at the elevator, realizing Lori is not the killer in this reality. Lori insists the killer cannot be Tombs as she just took him in for surgery. The killer stabs Lori, then chases Tree to the roof, where she accidentally falls to her death. Waking at the beginning of her loop, Tree demands that Ryan and his team help her escape it, requiring they test dozens of algorithms.

At Carter's suggestion, Tree serves as the group's recorder, killing herself at the end of each day so they can restart. Eventually, her injuries catch up with her, and she faints. Waking in the hospital, Tree steals a gun to go after Tombs, only to find Lori already dead. He attacks, disguised as Babyface, and Tree shoots him dead. However, a second Babyface killer appears, forcing Tree to kill herself and the killer.

The group finally discovers the correct algorithm, but a technical issue forces a delay. Having to choose which reality she wants to be in when both time loops close, Tree decides to remain in this dimension. Carter urges Tree to consider the consequences of living a life that is not truly hers and states that her experience with grief helped who she is now.

Tree hides from the killer in a hotel, but that evening, the news reports that Carter died trying to save Lori at the hospital. Tree kills herself by exploding a power station, deactivating the reactor so she can save Carter and Lori. The loop restarts and Tree decides to return to her own reality. She advises Lori to end her affair with her professor Gregory Butler, discovers that Danielle is cheating on Carter, and has a final conversation with her mom.

Bronson confiscates the reactor before the group can activate it. Believing she is too weak to survive another loop, Tree insists they retrieve the device. They enlist Danielle to distract Bronson while they recover the reactor. As Ryan readies the device, Tree goes to the hospital to rescue Lori from Tombs but is trapped by the second Babyface killer—revealed to be Gregory trying to bury the evidence of his affair with Lori. Gregory's wife Stephanie appears and shoots Lori, revealing she is in league with her husband, but he betrays and kills her also. In the ensuing confrontation, Tree outsmarts Gregory and kills him. Lori survives, and Tree and Carter kiss as the reactor activates, sending Tree back to her original dimension on September 19.

Later, Tree, Carter, Ryan, Samar, and Dre are escorted by agents to a DARPA laboratory, where the reactor has been moved for further experimentation. As they need a test subject, Tree volunteers Danielle, who wakes up in her room, screaming in horror.

== Cast ==
- Jessica Rothe as Tree Gelbman
- Israel Broussard as Carter Davis
- Phi Vu as Ryan Phan
- Suraj Sharma as Samar Ghosh
- Sarah Yarkin as Dre Morgan
- Rachel Matthews as Danielle Bouseman
- Ruby Modine as Lori Spengler
- Steve Zissis as Dean Bronson
- Charles Aitken as Gregory Butler
- Laura Clifton as Stephanie Butler
- Missy Yager as Julie Gelbman
- Jason Bayle as David Gelbman
- Caleb Spillyards as Tim Bauer
- Jimmy Gonzales as hospital police officer
- Rob Mello as John Tombs
- Tenea Intriago as student protester
- Tran Tran as Emily
- Blaine Kern III as Nick Sims
- Cariella Smith as Becky Shepard

== Production ==
=== Development ===
Ahead of the first film's release, director Christopher Landon talked about the possibility of a sequel, focusing on why Tree went into the time loop stating "The whole idea for my sequel is actually already in this movie".

Actress Jessica Rothe in an interview in 2018 stated that while most horror sequels retread the original, Landon's pitch instead "elevates the movie from being a horror movie into a Back to the Future type of genre film where the sequel joins us right from where we left off, it explains a lot of things in the first one that didn't get explained, and it elevates everything."

The sequel was officially announced with filming scheduled to begin on May 10, 2018.

=== Casting ===
Most of the original actors returned, including Rothe, Modine, Broussard, and Matthews. In addition, Suraj Sharma and Sarah Yarkin were cast.

=== Filming ===
Principal photography on the film began on May 14, 2018, in New Orleans, Louisiana. In November 2018, Ben Baudhuin was confirmed to be the film's editor.

== Music ==
On February 15, 2019, Back Lot Music released the original motion picture soundtrack for the film, with music produced by Bear McCreary.

A Lizzo cover of "Stayin' Alive" was released on January 2, 2019, as a stand-alone promotional single for the film. The song plays throughout the first set of end credits before the post-credit scene. It is not included in the soundtrack.

All tracks are written by Bear McCreary.

No.	Title	Length
1.	"Two Tuesdays"	5:15
2.	"Stalker at the Gym"	2:56
3.	"The Science Project"	2:54
4.	"Monday the 18th Again"	4:18
5.	"Danielle"	2:24
6.	"A Reason to Stay"	1:52
7.	"Back to the Hospital"	3:18
8.	"Trail of Blood"	4:48
9.	"Can't Save Everyone"	2:24
10.	"Solving Equations"	3:39
11.	"Electrical Substation"	2:57
12.	"Living in the Past"	2:03
13.	"Birthday Candles"	6:19
14.	"The Heist"	4:17
15.	"The Final Confrontation"	8:49
16.	"Darpa"	1:48
17.	"Happy Death Day 2U End Credits"	4:49
Total length:		64:50

== Release ==
Happy Death Day 2U was released on February 13, 2019. It was originally scheduled to be released one day later, on Valentine's Day. However, the film was rescheduled after a request from Fred Guttenberg, whose daughter, Jaime was a victim of the Stoneman Douglas High School shooting, which took place exactly one year prior.

The film was released digitally on April 30, 2019, and on Blu-ray and DVD on May 14. Distributor Shout! Factory released both Happy Death Day and Happy Death Day 2U on 4K Ultra HD Blu-Ray on May 31, 2022. The release included a new commentary track with director Christopher Landon and actress Jessica Rothe.

== Reception ==
=== Box office ===
Happy Death Day 2U grossed $28.1 million in the United States and Canada, and $36.5 million in other territories, for a worldwide total of $64.6 million, against a production budget of $9 million.

In the United States and Canada, Happy Death Day 2U was released alongside Isn't It Romantic, and was projected to gross $17–20 million from 3,207 theaters in its opening weekend. Opening without Tuesday night previews, the film made $992,000 on its first day, Wednesday, and $2.7 million on Valentine's Day, Thursday, for a two-day total of $3.7 million. It went on to debut to $9.8 million over the weekend (a five-day total of $13.5 million), finishing $3.5 million below expectations and fifth at the box office. The film dropped 48% in its second weekend, making $5 million and finishing seventh.

=== Critical response ===
On Rotten Tomatoes, the film has an approval rating of 72% based on 214 reviews, with an average rating of 6.1/10. The website's critical consensus reads, "A funnier follow-up with a sci-fi bent, Happy Death Day 2U isn't as fiendishly fresh as its predecessor, but fans of the original may still find this a sequel worth celebrating." On Metacritic, the film has a weighted average score of 57 out of 100, based on 31 critics, indicating "mixed or average" reviews. Audiences polled by CinemaScore gave the film an average grade of B on an A+ to F scale, the same score as the first film, while those at PostTrak gave it an average 2.5 out of 5 stars.

Kimber Myers, writing for the Los Angeles Times, said: "Happy Death Day 2U can't quite replicate the feelings of joy and discovery of the original, but Landon deserves credit for varying the tune, while still playing the hits that will please the fans of its predecessor." Meg Downey, critic for IGN, praised the film, grading it an 8.5/10 and writing, "Happy Death Day 2U deserves a healthy amount of praise for pushing its pedal to the metal all the way through. The level of risk-taking is refreshing, even when it's not completely successful at every single turn."

=== Novelization ===
On February 26, 2019, Blumhouse Books released a novelization written by Aaron Hartzler titled Happy Death Day & Happy Death Day 2U, to coincide with the second film's release.

== Sequel ==
Regarding the possibility of a third film, writer and director Christopher Landon has stated that he "definitely [has an idea for] the third movie in [his] head", while producer Jason Blum has said that if "enough people see this movie, we're gonna make a third movie, we want to make a third movie". In March 2019, following the film's less-than-projected box office gross, Blum said a third film was "not very [likely] but not impossible". In July 2019, Landon confirmed that a third film is not in development. In August 2019, Landon stated he had an outline written for the third film and believed he would eventually share it in some medium, be it another movie or not. In 2020, Blum said that while other studios would have cancelled a follow-up to Happy Death Day 2U following its financial underperformance, a third movie "is still on my radar in some shape or form". He later clarified that he was hard at work to get a deal done to make the film.

In September 2020, Landon confirmed a third film, tentatively titled Happy Death Day to Us, was in active development, with Rothe reprising her role. In November 2020, Landon stated that an outline for the script was ready to go and was awaiting approval from Universal. In February 2023, Landon confirmed he had pitched a third film. Landon stated that he has stories for the third film and a cross-over with Freaky written in his mind; and though he would like to develop both projects, he hopes Happy Death Day to Us is produced first. By April 2024, actress Jessica Rothe confirmed that the project was still in development; stating that Landon has the story written, and that all creatives involved were waiting for Universal Pictures and Blumhouse Productions to greenlight the production. In October of the same year, Landon stated that though the story is written he won't begin work on the script until the movie is given the greenlight. The filmmaker reiterated his intentions to see the project realized while revealing that the plot takes place on a different day than the two previous installments.

By March 2025, Landon stated that the greenlight for the project was ultimately up to the associated studios, while stating that at one time the companies had wanted to created a three-part limited series that would be released via streaming exclusively through Peacock. The filmmaker also acknowledged that he had not yet written the full script as he would only do so once the studio officially announces the movie. The following month, Landon and Jessica Rothe jointly announced that the third installment was officially moving forward. In March 2026, it was announced that a third installment could be in the future when Rothe revealed that Landon had "the whole third one figured out". That October, Rothe stated that she hoped a good performance by River, another horror movie she did for Blumhouse, could push the third Happy Death Day into production, and added that she had meetings with Landon where they acknowledged the film would be reworked to feature a graduated Tree and discuss her post-college life given the time gap of 7 years since Happy Death Day 2U, while still following most of the plot Landon originally conceived.

== See also ==
- List of films featuring time loops
