= River (2026 film) =

2026 film by Joshua Giuliano

- Teaser poster
- Directed by: Joshua Giuliano
- Written by: Joshua Giuliano
- Produced by: Steven Schneider; Nick Antosca; Alex Hedlund
- Starring: Jane Levy; Jessica Rothe; Max Mattern; Dane DiLiegro
- Cinematography: Nick Matthews
- Edited by: Thom Newell
- Music by: Mondo Boys
- Production companies: Shudder; Spooky Pictures; Eat the Cat
- Distributed by: Universal Pictures (Note: Universal, in partnership with Blumhouse Atomic, acquired the distribution rights from Independent Film Company and Shudder. Universal, Blumhouse Atomic, and Independent Film Company are listed as presenters.)
- Release dates: September 10, 2026 (TIFF); January 15, 2027 (United States)
- Running time: 93 minutes
- Country: United States
- Language: English

River is a 2026 American slasher film written and directed by Joshua Giuliano, in his directorial debut. The film stars Jane Levy, Jessica Rothe, Max Mattern, and Dane DiLiegro. Jason Blum serves as an executive producer through his Blumhouse Atomic banner.

River premiered at the Toronto International Film Festival (TIFF), under Midnight Madness on September 10, 2026, and will be distributed theatrically by Universal Pictures on January 15, 2027.

== Premise ==
Three estranged siblings reunite to scatter their late father's ashes on a remote river, but find themselves stranded on their broken-down boat and tormented by a faceless killer.

== Cast ==
- Jane Levy as Lucy, the middle sibling
- Jessica Rothe as Carla, the older sibling
- Max Mattern as Drew, the youngest sibling
- Dane DiLiegro as The Man

== Production ==
=== Development and casting ===
In August 2019, it was announced that Joshua Giulano was set to write and direct River for Tango Entertainment, with Nick Antosca serving as a producer through his Eat the Cat banner. In November 2025, it was announced that Jane Levy, Jessica Rothe, Dane DiLiegro and Max Mattern would star in the film.

=== Filming ===
The majority of the film was shot in Monongalia County, West Virginia and Marion County, West Virginia in 2025.

== Release ==
River premiered in the Midnight Madness section of the 2026 Toronto International Film Festival on September 10, 2026. Though River was backed and initially set to be distributed by Independent Film Company and Shudder, they decided to offload distribution rights following an overwhelmingly positive response from major distributors. A bidding war ensued, with A24, Focus Features, Paramount Pictures, and Netflix all dropping out by September 12, with Sony Pictures placing a bid of $8 million two days later. Ultimately, Jason Blum convinced Focus' parent company, Universal Pictures, and his own Blumhouse Atomic banner to place the winning bid of over $10 million. Universal acquired distribution rights for the United States and select international territories, with Upgrade handling sales elsewhere.

It had its U.S. premiere at Fantastic Fest on September 19, 2026. It is scheduled to be released by Universal Pictures on January 15, 2027.

== Reception ==
On the review aggregator website Rotten Tomatoes, 94% of 35 critics' reviews are positive, with an average rating of 7.1/10. Metacritic, which uses a weighted average, assigned the film a score of 70 out of 100, based on eight critics, indicating "generally favorable" reviews.
