= Tree Gelbman =

Fictional character in the Happy Death Day franchise

- Happy Death Day character
- Jessica Rothe as Tree Gelbman in Happy Death Day (2017)
- First appearance: Happy Death Day (2017)
- Created by: Scott Lobdell
- Portrayed by: Jessica Rothe

In-universe information
- Full name: Theresa Gelbman
- Nickname: Tree
- Gender: Female
- Occupation: College student
- Affiliation: Bayfield University; Kappa Pi Lambda Sorority
- Family: David Gelbman (father); Julie Gelbman (mother)
- Significant other: Carter Davis

Theresa "Tree" Gelbman is a fictional character in Christopher Landon's slasher film Happy Death Day (2017) and its sequel, Happy Death Day 2U (2019). She was created by writer Scott Lobdell and portrayed by Jessica Rothe in both of her performances. Gelbman's storyline revolves around her being murdered on the night of her birthday and finding herself reliving the day repeatedly. She uses this as an opportunity to figure out her killer's identity and prevent her death from ever occurring.

== Biography ==
Theresa "Tree" Gelbman was born on September 18 and is the daughter of David and Julie Gelbman, sharing a birth date with her mother. She attends Bayfield University and is a part of the Kappa Pi Lambda sorority. Her mother died three years ago, and Tree has become a more bitter person as she has had trouble coping with the death.

On her birthday in 2017, Tree was murdered by somebody wearing the university's mascot mask but finds herself reliving the day. With the aid of Carter, another student who gave her a place to rest after a party the previous night, Tree uses the loop to work out the identity of her killer. In the process, she reexamines her life and resolves to become a better person. Eventually, the killer is identified as Tree's roommate, Lori Spengler. Lori, jealous of Tree's affair with their teacher Dr. Gregory Butler, initially releases serial killer John Tombs in order to provide herself with an alibi for killing Tree. After Tree kills Tombs on the last loop but dies in her sleep from eating the poisoned cupcake Lori originally intended to use to kill her, Tree manages to stop Lori by stuffing the poisoned cupcake in Lori's mouth and kicking her out a window. In the end, Tree reconciles with her father and starts a relationship with Carter.

In the sequel, Tree learns she went through several time loops because of a device made by Ryan, Carter's roommate, who is also going through a time loop. At some point, Tree unintentionally re-enters the loop in a new dimension and learns there is a new killer. In this second loop, Tree learns that Lori is not trying to kill her, Tree's mother Julie is still alive, Carter is romantically involved with her friend Danielle and Tree is not having an affair with her teacher Gregory. In order to program the device to end the time loops, Tree is forced to learn how to operate the machinery herself, memorizing the various experiments Ryan's team carry out in past loops so that she can direct them on what not to do in subsequent loops until they have the right solution. Initially, Tree was content to stay in the alternate dimension with her mother until she realizes that her relationship with her mother is subtly different enough that she would always be aware of the changes and the fact she is not the Tree of that dimension; after Carter is killed trying to save Lori in one loop, she decides to return to her home dimension. The second killer is revealed to be Gregory, in league with his wife, Stephanie. Tree learns they were after Lori instead of her because Gregory is having an affair with Lori in this dimension and sought to kill her to save his reputation. After Gregory betrays and kills Stephanie, Tree kills him with a screwdriver to the heart and saves Lori before successfully returning to her own dimension.

== Other appearances ==
Tree Gelbman was a featured character in "The Horrors of Blumhouse" house at Halloween Horror Nights 28 in 2018. Jessica Rothe additionally reprised her role as Tree in Whitney Avalon's "This Song is Killer (ft. Jessica Rothe)", in promotion of the then-upcoming Happy Death Day 2U.

The 2020 "Treehouse of Horror XXXI" segment "Be Nine, Rewind" serves as a parody of Happy Death Day and Russian Doll, with Lisa Simpson (voiced by Yeardley Smith) taking the role of Tree.

== Reception ==
John Squires of Bloody Disgusting described Gelbman as a modern example of the "final girl" trope and contrasts her to Friday the 13th's Alice Hardy, writing "The Happy Death Day movies present a heroine so wonderfully and completely realized that this may very well be the first ever slasher franchise with a 'final girl' character as the main selling point. A character who evolves. A character who, with each new film thus far, becomes a better person right before our eyes."

Padraic Maroney of EDGE Media Network praised Rothe's portrayal of the heroine, stating "More than anything, what makes these films work is lead actress Jessica Rothe. ... Rothe offers a new take on the final girl." Style Island described the character as "the coolest girl in horror" and proceeded to say "Rothe plays the role with refreshing wit and the perfect amount of edginess mixed with empathy."

Nick Perkins, on ComingSoon.net, lists Tree as fifth on his list of slasher film final girls, writing that "Tree Gelbman starts off the first Happy Death Day movie as kind of a terrible person. She's selfish, apathetic and blissfully unaware. By the end of the movie, she's a rock star."

== See also ==
- Gender in horror films
