= Jeff Lima (actor) =

American actor

Jeff Lima is an American actor. He is best known for his recurring role as Leon Cruz on Chicago Fire.

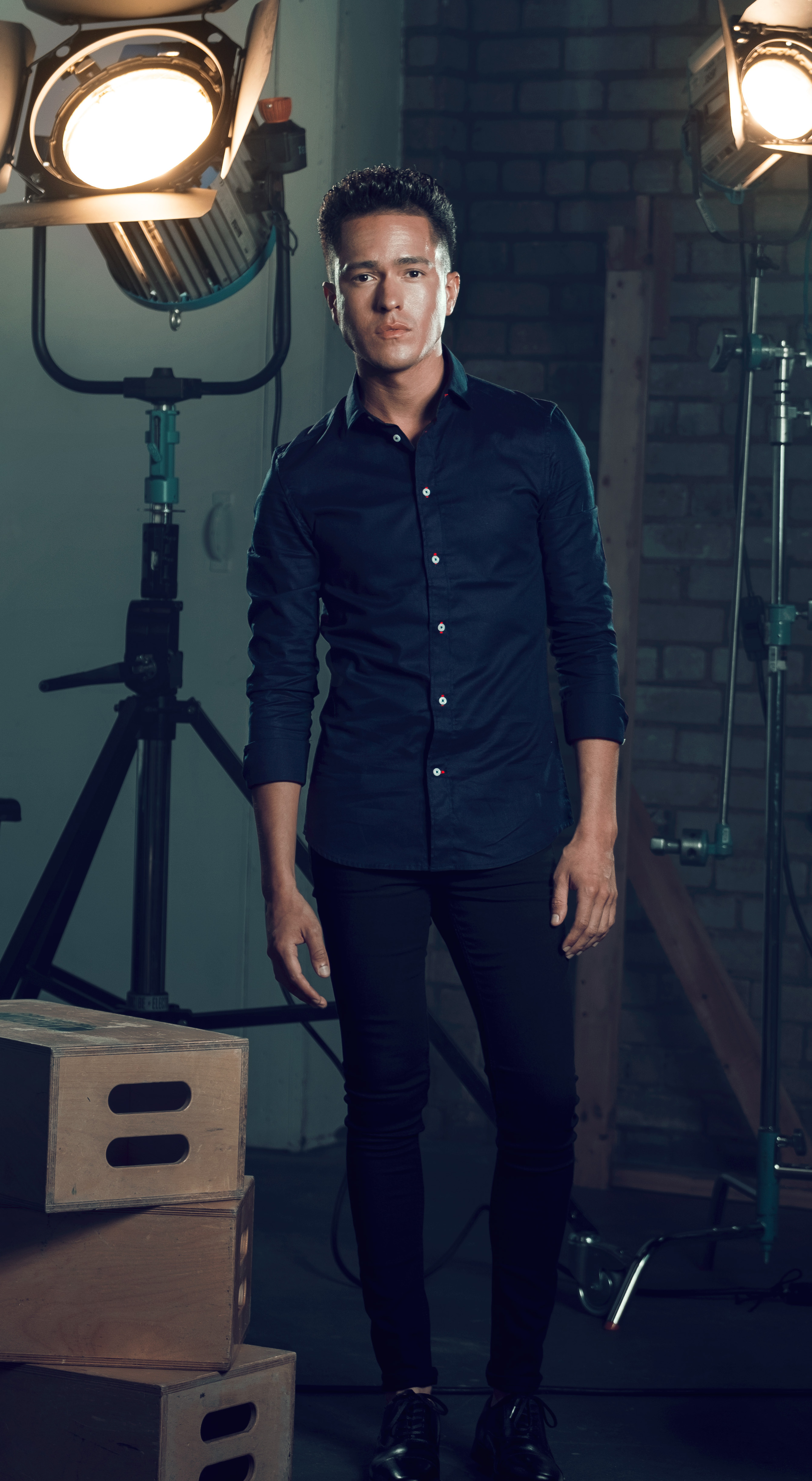
Jeff Lima La Voz Hispana December 12–18, 2019

== Early life ==
Jeff Lima was born in the Spanish Harlem neighborhood of New York City to a Puerto Rican family. At the age of 11, Lima began taking acting classes and merited a spot in a premiere New York City performing arts high school. While attending high school, he auditioned for a film in which he met Golden Globe winner Gina Rodriguez who introduced him to her agent, at the time, and he would later proceed to sign with them.

== Career ==
Lima landed his television debut on Guiding Light as Byron, opposite Jeff Branson and Gina Tognoni. He has appeared in numerous films including Stealing Cars, released in 2015. Lima has guest starred in CBS's Blue Bloods and NBC's Taxi Brooklyn. He was a series regular in the HBO American Miniseries Show Me a Hero. Jeff Lima also appeared in The Bobby Brown Story as Angel in the 2018 BET Network series. Notably, he appears as Leon Cruz in NBC's Chicago Fire.

Jeff Lima partnered with New York University Tisch School of the Arts to support the Film Program of the Maurice Kanbar Institute of Film and Television Graduate Division, by granting The Jeff Lima Production Award of $10,000 to be bestowed upon one directing student enrolled in the Graduate Film Program whose film project advances the Latinx presence on screen. The grant is in its second year with a recipient to be announced every spring.

== Filmography ==
=== Film ===
Year	Title	Role	Notes
2017	Bushwick	Gregory	
2015	Stealing Cars	Carlos	
2015	Eugenia and John	Latino Student	
2013	Jack, Jules, Esther & Me	Carlos	
2011	Mr. Popper's Penguins	Freddy	
2011	Gun Hill Road	Boy in Locker Room	
2010	Cop Out	youth#2	
2009	Mariachi	Carlos	
2009	Osvaldos	Jerry Dominguez	
2006	Half Nelson	Roodly	

=== Television ===
Year	Title	Role	Notes
2022	FBI	Mateo Diaz	1 episode
2012-2019	Chicago Fire	Leon Cruz	9 episodes
2018	The Bobby Brown Story	Angel	1 episode
2016	The Get Down	El Viejo	1 episode
2015	Show Me a Hero	John Santos, Jr.	4 episodes
2014	Taxi Brooklyn	Plex/ Maurice	1 episode
2013	Blue Bloods	Thomas Lugo	1 episode
2009	Guiding Light	Byron	2 episodes
