= Happy Death Day =

2017 American slasher film

- Theatrical release poster
- Directed by: Christopher Landon
- Written by: Scott Lobdell
- Produced by: Jason Blum
- Starring: Jessica Rothe; Israel Broussard
- Cinematography: Toby Oliver
- Edited by: Gregory Plotkin
- Music by: Bear McCreary
- Production company: Blumhouse Productions
- Distributed by: Universal Pictures
- Release date: October 13, 2017 (United States)
- Running time: 96 minutes
- Country: United States
- Language: English
- Budget: $4.8 million
- Box office: $125.5 million

Happy Death Day is a 2017 American black comedy slasher film directed by Christopher Landon and written by Scott Lobdell. It stars Jessica Rothe and Israel Broussard. The film follows college student Tree Gelbman, who is murdered on the night of her birthday but begins reliving the day repeatedly, at which point she sets out to find the killer and stop her death. Jason Blum serves as a producer through his Blumhouse Productions company.

Happy Death Day was released by Universal Pictures on October 13, 2017, and received generally mixed reviews. It grossed $125.5 million worldwide on a $4.8 million budget. A sequel, Happy Death Day 2U, was released on February 13, 2019.

== Plot ==
After a night of drunken partying, Tree Gelbman wakes up on her birthday in the dorm room of classmate Carter Davis. She dismisses him and returns to her room. Her sorority housemate Lori Spengler surprises her with a cupcake for her birthday, which she throws away rudely. Tree meets with her married professor, Gregory Butler, with whom she is having an affair, almost being caught by Gregory's wife. That night, on her way to a party, Tree is lured into a tunnel and murdered by a figure wearing a mask.

She immediately wakes up back in Carter's bed and is unnerved to find the previous day's events repeating themselves. Baffled, she relives the day, this time avoiding the tunnel and reaching the party. However, the masked killer follows her and murders her again. Tree again wakes up in Carter's bed, realizes she is in a time loop, and barricades herself in her room to avoid death. The killer, already hiding inside, murders her a third time.

Waking up, Tree explains the events to Carter. He suggests taking advantage of the loop to identify her killer. She spends the next several iterations trailing suspects but she is killed each time. After waking from a loop where she is bludgeoned, Tree faints and awakens in the campus hospital. When the killer shows up, she escapes the hospital in Gregory's car, only to be pursued and killed again.

Back in Carter's bed, Tree convinces him of her predicament by demonstrating her knowledge of the day's events. She sees a news report on John Tombs, a serial killer being held at the campus hospital. Concluding that Tombs is her killer, she rushes to the hospital to warn of his escape.

Tombs breaks free and nearly kills Tree, but Carter follows and rescues her. Tombs kills Carter before chasing Tree to a bell tower, where she manages to subdue him with a crowbar. Before delivering a fatal blow, she realizes that if she kills Tombs and ends the loop, Carter will remain dead forever. Therefore, she runs to the top of the tower and hangs herself from the bell rope.

Tree awakens in Carter's dorm room and finds him alive again. Now confident in solving her murder, she proceeds happily through the day. She apologizes and offers friendship to Lori, ends her affair with Gregory, and meets her estranged father for lunch, where they begin to reconcile. That night, she goes to the hospital and traps and kills Tombs. Relieved to be free, she celebrates her birthday in Carter's room and finally eats the cupcake Lori gave her.

The next day, Tree wakes up still in the loop. Horrified, she returns to her room with the intent to run away, when Lori offers her the cupcake again. Tree realizes that the previous loop was the only time she ate the cupcake, and she had died in her sleep; this meant that Lori had poisoned the cupcake. Lori is her true killer, and when Tree threw away the poisoned cupcake, Lori used her job as a nurse to frame Tombs for Tree's murder.

Lori admits to also having an affair with Gregory, whose preference for Tree drove her insane with jealousy. She then attacks Tree, but Tree manages to stuff the poisoned cupcake in her mouth, then kicks her out of a second-floor window to her death.

At a restaurant, Tree and Carter muse over the day's events, and he offers her his room for the night. The next day, she wakes up believing she is still in the time loop, but Carter quickly reveals he was just playing a prank on her and it is really the next day. Tree is too relieved to be angry at him, and the two kiss.

== Cast ==
- Jessica Rothe as Tree Gelbman
- Israel Broussard as Carter Davis
- Ruby Modine as Lori Spengler, Tree's friend and roommate
- Charles Aitken as Gregory Butler
- Laura Clifton as Stephanie Butler
- Jason Bayle as David Gelbman, Tree's estranged father
- Rob Mello as John Tombs
- Rachel Matthews as Danielle Bouseman
- Phi Vu as Ryan Pham
- Blaine Kern III as Nick Sims
- Cariella Smith as Becky Shepherd

== Production ==
=== Pre-production ===
The film, initially titled Half to Death, is based on an original story created by screenwriter Scott Lobdell. It was first announced in June 2007, to be produced by Michael Bay and Rogue Pictures, and directed by Antti Jokinen. Christopher Landon was hired to rewrite Lobdell's original screenplay. Landon said, "The movie was in pre-production or soft production at the time, and I came on and I loved the concept of the movie. I loved the idea of a girl, trapped in a time loop who has to solve her own murder." The project was only revived years later, as original producer Angela Mancuso had lunch with Landon and remembered Half to Death. Landon decided to send the script to Jason Blum of Blumhouse Productions, with whom he had worked on the Paranormal Activity sequels, and he approved it, leading to a green-light by Universal Pictures. Blumhouse announced the project on October 11, 2016, with Landon directing and Jessica Rothe cast in the lead role of the film. On November 8, 2016, it was announced that Ruby Modine, Charles Aitken and Rachel Matthews had joined the cast, alongside Rothe and Israel Broussard. The film got eventually retitled Happy Death Day in June 2017.

The baby mask was constructed by Tony Gardner and chosen as one of two potential concepts. Landon explains, "During preproduction ... I was expecting my first son. I don't know if I just had babies on the brain, or if I was subconsciously scared to become a father, but that baby image was floating around in my head. Tony made us a pig mask, too, but when I wore the baby mask in the office, I scared a co-worker, and we thought ... yeah, this is it. This is the one." Scream was listed among the influences Christopher Landon took for the film, along with Halloween (1978), Groundhog Day and comedies of the 1980s such as Sixteen Candles and Back to the Future, given he aimed to make a "fun, silly horror movie". He also aimed to emulate the protagonist's personal growth in Groundhog Day to comment on "this age of social media and all the crappy things that kids do to each other".

=== Writing ===
Comic book writer Scott Lobdell said he wanted to play with the tropes of the slasher genre, as according to him "every slasher film opens up with the mean girl getting killed and the good girl living till the end. And I thought, 'How can I make the mean girl and the good girl the same person?'" In the original draft, Lori and Dr. Butler were the killers together. Landon says, "They were a psycho couple murdering Tree together. That ultimately didn't work for me. I thought Gregory was a great opportunity to be a suspect. To make him a killer, it didn't help me. That was a change I really wanted to make." Also, in the original draft there was no birthday, and no romance, which Landon added to humanize Tree. Landon decided to shorten the protagonist's name Teresa into Tree, which also conveyed her character arc, as "trees need to grow and you see this character go from one person to another".

=== Filming ===
Filming took place at and around Loyola University in New Orleans, Louisiana, and it lasted five weeks. The scenes where Tree awakens in Carter's bed after her death were filmed back to back in a span of two days. The scene after Tree pushes Lori out of the window was supposed to take place at the sorority house, but the filming permit had ended before production was able to shoot there, forcing the location to be changed to a Los Angeles diner.

=== Original ending ===
In the film's original ending, Tree is taken to the hospital after her encounter with Lori. The doctor instructs Tree to stay away from pain medication for at least a day due to the extent of her injuries. After he leaves, a nurse comes in and says she is giving Tree something for the pain. Tree informs the nurse of the doctor's orders. The nurse reveals herself to be Dr. Butler's wife, Stephanie, who says it is for her own pain. She then murders Tree in revenge for her husband's affair with the girl.

This version was shown in the test screenings for the film and was received negatively by the audience, which led the writers to create the theatrical ending. Landon also revealed Lori and Dr. Butler were the killers in the rough drafts, which later inspired the idea of the poisoned cupcake.

=== Legal issues ===
The film, which is set in New Orleans (and was filmed on the campus of Loyola University New Orleans), has the killer wearing a mask that is nearly identical to "King Cake Baby", the official mascot of the New Orleans Pelicans basketball team. Johnson Berticelli, the mascot's creator, sued Universal Pictures and Blumhouse for copyright infringement, demanding half of the film's profits. A settlement was reached in 2021.

=== Music ===
Bear McCreary composed the score of Happy Death Day. Reflecting the film's blend of horror and comedy, McCreary stated that he wanted "a schizophrenic, dual personality, with light-hearted comedic scoring on one end, and genuinely terrifying soundscapes on the other." This approach is highlighted by the two main leitmotifs, an energetic theme for Tree evoking contemporary pop music, and one for the killer that consists of distorted vocals provided by McCreary's young daughter Sonatine. The percussion in the score are mostly sampled from college marching band drum lines to evoke the collegiate setting. While the film's trailer featured 50 Cent's "In Da Club" as Tree's ringtone, Landon said the film could not afford to use the track, but still preferred the eventual song music supervisor Andrea von Foerster improvised, the comedic "Busy Day Birthday".

Standard album
No.	Title	Length
1.	"Day One"	5:26
2.	"Day Two"	6:05
3.	"Day Three"	4:18
4.	"Day Four"	2:17
5.	"Hospital Pursuit"	5:55
6.	"The Bell Tower"	3:30
7.	"Righting Wrongs"	3:40
8.	"Tree Takes Control"	4:30
9.	"The Cupcake"	4:16
Total length:		39:57

Bonus track
No.	Title	Length
10.	"Happy Death Day End Title Credits"	4:19
Total length:		44:16

== Reception ==
=== Box office ===
Happy Death Day grossed $55.7 million in the United States and Canada, and $69.8 million in other territories, for a worldwide total of $125.5 million, against a production budget of $4.8 million.

In the United States and Canada, Happy Death Day was released alongside Marshall, The Foreigner and Professor Marston and the Wonder Women, and was expected to gross $15–20 million from 3,130 theaters in its opening weekend. It made $1 million from Thursday night previews at 2,450 theaters, similar to fellow Blumhouse release The Visit ($1.05 million in 2015) and $11.6 million on its first day, increasing weekend projections to $26 million. It went on to debut to $26 million, topping the box office, making it the third Blumhouse Productions film of 2017 (after Split and Get Out) to do so. It fell 64% in its second weekend to $9.4 million, finishing in third behind newcomers Boo 2! A Madea Halloween and Geostorm.

=== Critical response ===
On the review aggregator website Rotten Tomatoes, 71% of 157 critics' reviews are positive, with an average rating of 6/10. The website's consensus reads: "Happy Death Day puts a darkly humorous sci-fi spin on slasher conventions, with added edge courtesy of a starmaking performance from Jessica Rothe." Metacritic, which uses a weighted average, assigned the film a score of 58 out of 100, based on 26 critics, indicating "mixed or average" reviews. Audiences polled by CinemaScore gave the film an average grade of B on an A+ to F scale, while PostTrak reported 52% of filmgoers rated it as "definite recommend".

Critics noted that although the film makes laudable attempts at merging genres—including romantic comedy, horror and "campus satire"—the end results were mixed. Chris Agar of Screen Rant said that the "fun, if silly, blending of genre tropes ... ends up being a double-edged sword." RelishMix—a company that tracks social media engagement—stated that audiences described it as "Groundhog Day meets Scream".

=== Home media ===
Happy Death Day was released on digital HD on January 2, 2018, and was released on DVD and Blu-Ray on January 16, 2018. Distributor Shout! Factory released both Happy Death Day and Happy Death Day 2U on 4K Ultra HD Blu-Ray on May 31, 2022. The releases included a new commentary track with Landon and Rothe.

== Other media ==
On February 26, 2019, Blumhouse Books released a novelization written by Aaron Hartzler titled Happy Death Day & Happy Death Day 2U, to coincide with the second film's release.

== Sequel(s) ==
Director Christopher Landon talked about the possibility of a sequel, focusing on why Tree went into a time loop. Jessica Rothe stated that while most horror sequels retread the original, Landon's pitch instead "elevates the movie from being a horror movie into a Back to the Future type of genre film where the sequel joins us right from where we left off, it explains a lot of things in the first one that didn't get explained, and it elevates everything."

The sequel was officially announced with filming scheduled to begin on May 10, 2018. Most of the original actors returned, including Rothe, Modine, Broussard, and Matthews. In addition, Suraj Sharma and Sarah Yarkin were cast. The sequel, titled Happy Death Day 2U, was released on February 13, 2019.

In March 2026, it was announced that a third installment could be in the future when Rothe revealed that Landon had "the whole third one figured out" during an interview with Screen Rant.

== See also ==
- List of films featuring time loops
