= Jessica Rothe =

American actress (born 1987)

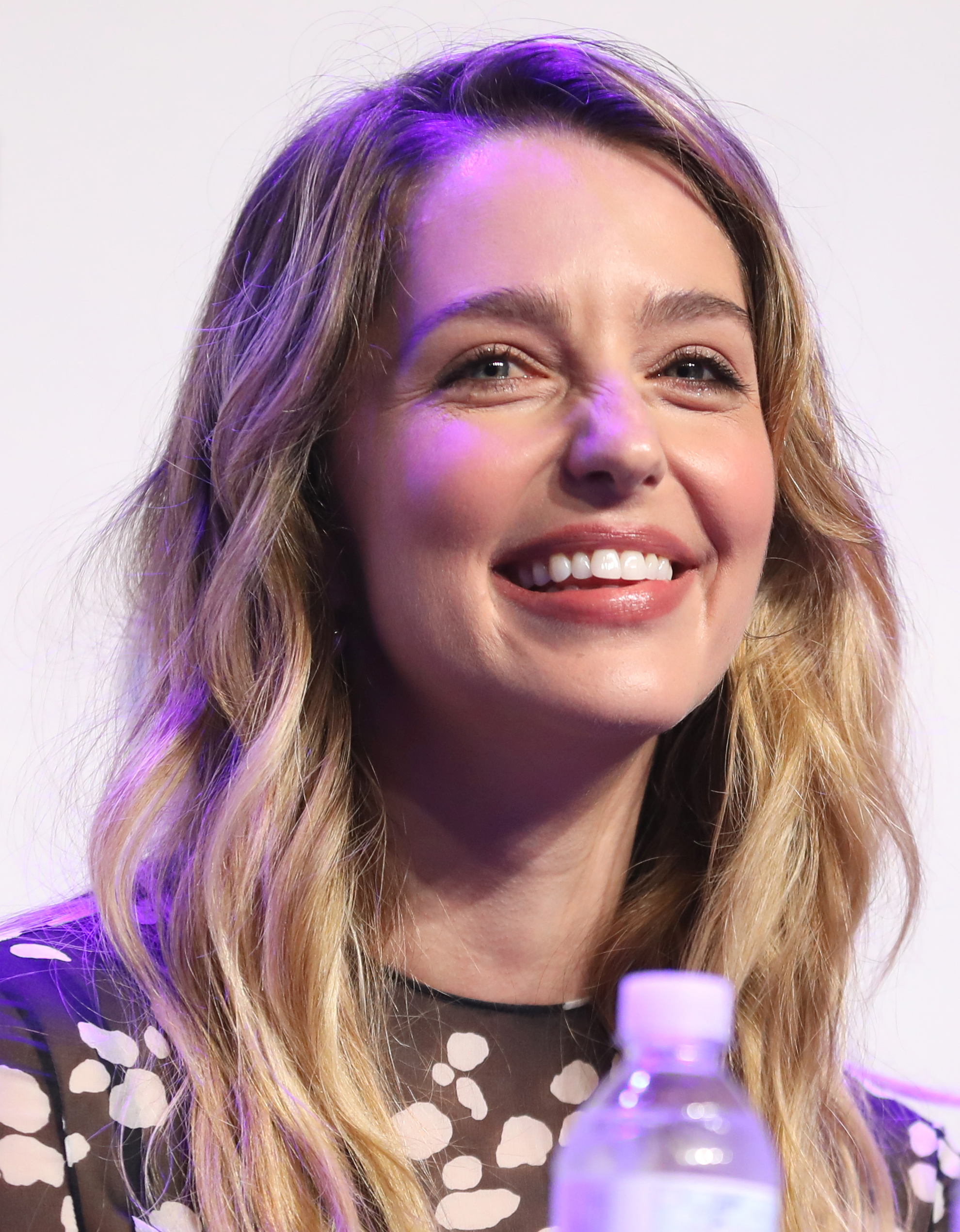
- Rothe in 2024
- Born: Jessica Ann Rothenberg; May 28, 1987 (age 39); Denver, Colorado, U.S.
- Education: Boston University (BFA)
- Occupation: Actress
- Years active: 2010–present
- Spouse: Eric Clem (m. 2020)

Jessica Ann Rothenberg (born May 28, 1987), known professionally as Jessica Rothe (/rɒθ/), is an American actress. After appearing in independent films and on stage, her breakthrough role came with playing Tree Gelbman in the comedy slasher film Happy Death Day (2017) and its 2019 sequel, which established her as a scream queen.

Rothe has starred in the musical films La La Land (2016) and Valley Girl (2020), the romantic drama films Forever My Girl (2018) and All My Life (2020), and the action thriller film Boy Kills World (2023). On television, she starred in the comedy series Mary + Jane (2016), the science fiction Parallels (2015) and the science fiction drama series Utopia (2020).

== Early life ==
Rothe was born in Denver, Colorado, the daughter of Susan and Steve Rothenberg. Rothe's father is Jewish and a pediatric surgeon. Her paternal grandmother Colleen Rothenberg was a theatre actress who belonged to the Congregation Shomrei Torah synagogue in Santa Rosa, California.

Rothe took ballet classes when she was age eight. As a youth, she attended summer theater camps in Kansas City. Rothe attended Cherry Creek High School and then Boston University, graduating in 2009 with a bachelor's degree in fine arts; during that time, she learned to play the violin, tap dance, and make pottery.

== Career ==
=== 2010–2016: Early work and stage ===
Rothe began acting under her birth name Jessica Rothenberg and, from 2010 to 2013, made minor appearances in shows such as The Onion News Network and played supporting roles in independent films such as The Hot Flashes and Jack, Jules, Esther and Me, among others. She also made her stage debut in 2011, starring in the David West Read play The Dream of the Burning Boy. Charles Isherwood of The New York Times wrote that Rothe gave an "impressive" performance. She and the cast of the 2014 series Next Time on Lonny earned a Streamy Award nomination.

In 2015, Rothe had leading roles in the comedy film Lily & Kat, the Netflix science fiction pilot Parallels, and the crime drama film The Preppie Connection. That same year, she was cast as Alexis in Damien Chazelle's musical film La La Land. Rothe was drawn to the role since, as a child, "I just thought that living in a world where any moment someone could burst into song and dance would be the dreamiest thing in the world".

In 2016, Rothe had her first leading role in a television series, playing Paige in the MTV comedy series Mary + Jane. Described as a "weed-comedy" and produced by Snoop Dogg, the show ran for one season. The show earned mixed reviews, though critics praised Rothe's and her co-star Scout Durwood's acting. Daniel Fienberg of The Hollywood Reporter said that they "have a rapport that feels natural and unforced, even if so much of the rest of the show feels often wildly forced, or at least like its trying too hard".

=== 2017–present: Mainstream breakthrough ===
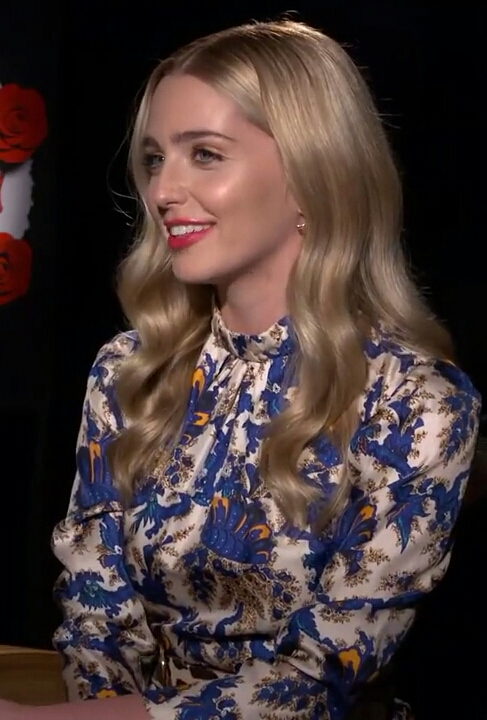
Rothe in an interview with MTV in 2019

In 2017, Rothe starred in the Christopher Landon horror film Happy Death Day—originally titled Half to Death—as Theresa "Tree" Gelbman. The character was written with the intention of having more depth than the average slasher character, part of which is reflected through the nickname Tree as "trees need to grow and you see this character go from one person to another". Happy Death Day was a significant box office success and was called a "starmaking" film for Rothe. Writing for RogerEbert.com, Brian Tallerico said that Rothe was "quite good in a way that makes me eager to see what she does next. Her performance is quite easily the best thing about the movie." Simran Hans of The Guardian described her as "endlessly watchable and witty". Jeannette Catsoulis of The New York Times called her "unimprovable", "inexhaustable and funny". The character has been called an example of the "final girl" trope and established Rothe as a scream queen. She was nominated for a Fright Meter Award and a New Mexico Film Critics Circle Award.

In 2018, Rothe played Josie in the romance film Forever My Girl, which she accepted based on the themes of strength and female empowerment. Her sole release of that year, the film received negative reviews from critics.

In 2019, Rothe reprised the role of Tree Gelbman in Happy Death Day 2U, a sequel to Happy Death Day. The film was conceived by Landon before its predecessor was released, and Rothe was initially hesitant to participate, feeling that a sequel could potentially retread the original. However, she was convinced by Landon's pitch and believed it "elevates the movie from being a horror movie into a Back to the Future type of genre film where the sequel joins us right from where we left off, it explains a lot of things in the first one that didn't get explained, and it elevates everything". It was released to similar financial success. Kimber Myers of the Los Angeles Times called Rothe "one of the most magnetic new actresses on screen, equally capable of showing vulnerability and pain as well as a blithe, easy humor." She earned a second Fright Meter Award nomination for her work in the film.

In 2020, Rothe had starring roles in two films: the jukebox musical Valley Girl, a remake of the 1983 film, and the romantic drama All My Life. Valley Girl saw Rothe playing Julie. In All My Life, she played Jennifer "Jenn" Carter. Both films garnered a mixed reception from critics, though Rothe's performances earned some praise. Also in 2020, she appeared in four episodes of the Amazon Prime Video series Utopia. Rothe said that "working with Gillian Flynn and the incredible cast in Chicago was a dream job, and I’m so excited for audiences to go through that emotional rollercoaster. It’s unique, fun and tragic all at the same time".

Rothe next starred in the crime drama film Body Brokers. She was cast in 2019, and the film was released in 2021, her sole release of that year. Though he gave the film a mixed review, Peter Sobczynski of RoberEbert.com said Rothe and co-star Melissa Leo "do strong work as those who represent the non-exploitative side of the rehabilitation world."

In 2022, Rothe replaced actress Samara Weaving in the action film Boy Kills World; the film premiered at the 2023 Toronto International Film Festival, and was theatrically released in April 2024. Lauren Coates of The A.V. Club said that Rothe's character was "underwritten and enters the game too late to be effectively used. Her helmet gimmick is mistakenly substituted for a personality—a truly grievous waste of a charming young talent." More positively, Chase Hutchinson of The Seattle Times said her performance "provided redemption". She reprised the role in a spin-off game, Super Dragon Punch Force 3, released that same month.

In 2026, Rothe starred in the survival thriller film Beware Boiúna, as well as the slasher River, which is scheduled to receive a wide release in 2027.

== Personal life ==
On February 14, 2019, Rothe announced that she was engaged to actor Eric Clem. They married on September 12, 2020, in Morrison, Colorado.

== Filmography ==
=== Film ===
Year	Title	Role	Notes
2013	The Last Keepers	Jessica	(Note: Credited as Jessica Rothenberg)
2013	The Hot Flashes	Millie Rash	
2013	Bastards of Young	Samantha the Devil	
2013	Jack, Jules, Esther and Me	Jules	
2015	Lily & Kat	Lily	
2015	Parallels	Beatrix Carver	
2015	The Preppie Connection	Laura	
2016	Juveniles	Amber	
2016	Trust Fund	Reese Donahue	
2016	Wolves	Lola	
2016	The Tribe	Jenny	
2016	Summertime	Jules	
2016	La La Land	Alexis	
2016	Better Off Single	Mary	
2017	Tater Tot & Patton	Andie	
2017	Happy Death Day	Tree Gelbman	
2017	Please Stand By	Julie	
2018	Forever My Girl	Josie Mollee Swan	
2019	Happy Death Day 2U	Tree Gelbman	
2020	Valley Girl	Julie Richman	
2020	All My Life	Jenn Carter	
2021	Body Brokers	May	
2023	Boy Kills World	Mina Van Der Koy / June 27	
2025	Affection	Ellie Carter / Sarah Thompson	
2026	Imposters	Marie	
2026	River	Carla	
2026	Beware Boiúna	Alli	
2026	Pathetic Fallacy	Iris	

=== Television ===
Year	Title	Role	Notes
2010	America's Most Wanted: America Fights Back	Bojana Mitic	Episode: "The Pink Panthers"
2011	The Onion News Network	Katie Clements	2 episodes
2011	Happy Endings	Teenage girl	Episode: "Baby Steps"
2012	Gossip Girl	Young woman	Episode: "The Backup Dan"
2013	Blue Bloods	Sylvie Freeland	Episode: "Protest Too Much"
2013	Futurestates	Maya	Episode: "Promised Land"
2013	High Maintenance	Rachel	Episode: "Elijah"
2013	Next Time on Lonny	Stephanie	Recurring role
2016	Chicago P.D.	Madison	Episode: "If We Were Normal"
2016	Mary + Jane	Paige	Main role
2019	Whitney Avalon: This Song is Killer	Theresa "Tree" Gelbman	Web series
2020	Utopia	Samantha	Recurring role
2020	Delilah	Delilah	Main role; unsold HBO Max pilot
2021	Eli Roth's History of Horror	Herself	Episode: "Holiday Horror"
2024	Virgin River	Sarah Jensen	Recurring role
2025	Pulse	Cass Himmelstein	Main role

=== Stage ===
- The Dream of the Burning Boy (2011), as Chelsea

=== Video game ===
- Super Dragon Punch Force 3 (2024), as Mina Van Der Koy / June 27

== Awards and nominations ==
Award	Year	Category	Nominated work	Result	Ref.
Fright Meter Awards	2017	Best Actress in a Leading Role	Happy Death Day	Nominated	
Fright Meter Awards	2019	Best Actress in a Leading Role	Happy Death Day 2U	Nominated	
New Mexico Film Critics Circle Awards	2017	Best Actress	Happy Death Day	Nominated	
Streamy Awards	2014	Best Ensemble Cast	Next Time on Lonny	Nominated	
