= David Vigliano =

American literary agent (born 1959)

- Born: David Vigliano; June 18, 1959 (age 67); New York, New York, US
- Education: Hunter College; Harvard University Business School
- Occupations: Literary agent, Entrepreneur
- Website: viglianoassociates.com

David Vigliano is an American literary agent. He is the founder and head of Vigliano Associates, a boutique literary agency. He is best known for working with "headline-making" authors and for negotiating record-setting advances. Since 2002, 112 of his projects have appeared on The New York Times Best Seller list, with 22 hitting the #1 position.

== Early life and education ==
Vigliano was born in New York. His mother, Barbara Murphy Vigliano, was an actress who starred in live television shows in the 1940s, and his father Eli was a lawyer, as is David's brother Dean. Vigliano attended Hunter College, where he graduated magna cum laude with a degree in communications, and earned an MBA from Harvard Business School in 1983.

== Career ==
Following college, Vigliano returned to New York, where he was hired as the Director of Packaging at Warner Books. There, Vigliano moved beyond the traditional practice of passively acquiring new properties, and instead generated book ideas and pursued new authors. In 1986, with no experience as a literary agent, he founded Vigliano Associates.

While he represents both fiction and non-fiction, Vigliano has received significant attention for securing substantial advances for celebrities, including a reported $4,000,000 advance for Kurt Cobain's journals in 2000. His notable clients have included Michael Jackson, George Noory Justin Timberlake, Mike Tyson, Shaquille O'Neal, Willie Nelson, Joanna Gaines, Chip Gaines, Alicia Keys, Janet Jackson, Britney Spears, David Blaine, Prince, Pearl Jam, Scott Weiland, Rocco DiSpirito, Courtney Love, Anthony Kiedis, Suzanne Somers, and Pope John Paul II. His roster also includes Bob Greene, Melody Beattie, Nicholas Perricone, Jerry Jenkins, Ben Parr, and Blake Mycoskie. Vigliano's literary projects include artist James Rosenquist's autobiography, Eddie Little's Another Day in Paradise, and Douglas Coupland's Generation X, which sold more than 1,000,000 copies.

Vigliano has negotiated film rights for several of his books. Ben Mezrich's Bringing Down the House, was the source material for MGM's 21, and The Oldest Rookie, by Jim Morris and Joe Engel, was adapted into the Disney movie The Rookie, starring Dennis Quaid. An article by Mike Sager in GQ was adapted into the Touchstone film Veronica Guerin, starring Cate Blanchett.

In 2012, he started Vigliano Books, an electronic book publishing venture that has worked with authors such as Tim Cowlishaw, Richard Belzer, David Blaine, Linda Davies, and Jerry B. Jenkins. Although he continued to run it, in 2014 Vigliano sold the company to Y Entertainment. He reacquired it in April 2020.

== Personal life ==
Vigliano lives in New York City. He has performed as a stand-up comic at clubs in Las Vegas, Los Angeles and New York.
