= Michael Landon, the Father I Knew =

- Title screen
- Also known as: A Father's Son
- Written by: Linda Bergman
- Story by: Michael Landon Jr. Linda Bergman
- Directed by: Michael Landon Jr.
- Starring: John Schneider; Cheryl Ladd; Joel Berti; Trever O'Brien; Shawn Pyfrom; Sarah Lancaster; J. Kenneth Campbell; Julie Condra
- Theme music composer: Richard Bellis
- Country of origin: United States
- Original language: English

Production
- Executive producers: Mark Bacino; Allen Epstein; Jim Green
- Producer: Linda Bergman
- Cinematography: Michael Slovis
- Editor: Peter Svab
- Running time: 89 minutes
- Production company: Green/Epstein Productions

Original release
- Network: CBS
- Release: May 23, 1999

Michael Landon, the Father I Knew is a 1999 American made-for-television biographical drama film directed by Michael Landon Jr. documenting his privileged, but often troubled, childhood as the son of beloved television actor, writer and director, Michael Landon. The film stars John Schneider as Michael Landon, Cheryl Ladd as his second wife Lynn Noe Landon, and Joel Berti, Trever O'Brien and Shawn Pyfrom sharing the role of their eldest son, Michael Landon Jr. throughout his childhood years. The film originally aired on CBS on May 23, 1999.

== Synopsis ==
The film opens with Michael Landon Jr. as a child (Shawn Pyfrom) living a comfortable and happy life with his family: his father, Bonanza star Michael Landon (John Schneider); his mother, Lynn Noe Landon (Cheryl Ladd); and his elder sister, Leslie Landon (Rachel Duncan). Landon is a compassionate and loving father who dotes on his children.

When Lynn announces a new baby is on the way, the family moves to a larger house in the San Fernando Valley. As the family grows and life begins to change, Michael Sr. becomes dissatisfied with his career and home life and his desire to fulfill his own needs take precedence over those of his wife and children. Soon, the teenage Michael Jr. (Trever O'Brien) and the rest of the Landon family learn that Landon has begun an extra-marital affair with a younger woman, Little House on the Prairie make-up artist, Cindy (Julie Condra). He soon divorces Lynn and marries Cindy.

Feeling rejected as a result of the distant relationship that develops over time as their father begins a new family with Cindy, the young adult Michael Jr. (Joel Berti) struggles in his college classes and turns to alcohol, while his sister Leslie (Sarah Lancaster) develops bulimia, believing her estranged father might take more of an interest in her if she were thinner.

After dropping out of school and overcoming his alcohol dependency, Michael Jr. meets his future wife Sharee Gregory while working on the set of Highway to Heaven and the young couple are married. On their first anniversary, Sharee announces she's pregnant however, the happiness is short-lived when Michael Sr. is diagnosed with terminal pancreatic cancer. Michael Jr. finally learns from his mother the truth of his father's unstable childhood, which may partly explain his irrational behavior and turbulent family life as an adult. Michael Sr. dies not long after.

== Cast ==
- John Schneider ... Michael Landon
- Cheryl Ladd ... Lynn Noe Landon
- Joel Berti ... Michael Landon Jr.
- Trever O'Brien ... Michael Landon Jr. - Age 15
- Shawn Pyfrom ... Michael Landon Jr. - Age 10
- Sarah Lancaster ... Leslie Landon
- Angela Seger ... Leslie Landon - 17
- Rachel Duncan ... Leslie Landon - Age 12
- J. Kenneth Campbell ... Andy Glennon
- Julie Condra ... Cindy Landon
- Jack S. Kimball ... Adult Jack
- Adam Wylie ... Teenage Jack
- Sivionna Hass ... Shawna Landon - Age 13
- Lynsey Parker ... Shawna Landon - Age 11
- Daveigh Chase ... Shawna Landon - Age 8
- Corey Bringas ... Christopher Landon - Age 10
- Camryn Walling ... Christopher Landon - Age 8
- Nicholai Bolam ... Christopher Landon - Age 5
- Alexis Brigante ... Brittany Landon
- Justin Chapman ... Josh Landon
- Jill Drexler ... Dodie Landon
- Marisa Petroro ... Sharee Landon
- Pauli Wolfe ... Ashley Landon

== Development ==
Michael Landon Jr. has stated that the film is based on a combination of his own experiences growing up and the last interview his father gave which was published in the June 1991 issue of Life magazine shortly before his death. In February 2005, Landon Jr. explained how the screenplay was conceived, saying "The movie was centered around the divorce, and that was my main reason for making the film. I basically used the guidelines my father had set in his Life magazine article, the last interview he gave before he died. The movie put things in perspective from my point of view — the affair, his drinking, everything in the Life article. I went by the parameters set by my father in that article, and I was not going to disrespect those parameters. The only difference was that it was exploring what I was going through, and my brothers and sisters were going through."

== Reception ==
The film received mixed reviews, with some critics detecting an element of retribution in Landon Jr.'s screenplay. Entertainment Weekly critic Ken Tucker gave the film a C+ writing, "[L]ove starved, Michael Landon Jr. harbors little affection for one of TV's most beloved stars. Where the public saw the elder Landon as a cocky-but-concerned family man, Junior recalls a workaholic who neglected the kids of his multiple marriages in favor of a succession of ever-younger wives. [...] As therapy for its creator, The Father I Knew is probably healing; as drama for us, it's congealing. But the movie is also so excessive — in its abject emotionalism, its dime-store psychologizing, its casting — that this version of Daddy Dearest exerts a certain undeniable pull."

People magazine critic Terry Kelleher felt similarly, writing "There's talk of forgiving and moving on in the last stages of this TV movie. But its director, Michael Landon Jr., seems more intent on making sure the world knows that his famous father (who died of cancer in 1991) was a hypocrite. No matter how well-founded the son's grievances, his film memoir feels vindictive as well as heavy-handed. [...] The story ends on a note of reconciliation, but the dominant chord is one of resentment. Bottom Line: Honesty is fine, but this smacks of getting even with Dad."

Variety critic Stuart Levine felt the film did a good job of chronicling the elder Landon's emotional phases, writing "Michael Landon, who starred in wholesome family dramas throughout his five-decade television career before his death in 1991, didn't always find that warmth in his own home, as illustrated in CBS' thoughtful, if somewhat predictable, "Michael Landon, the Father I Knew." John Schneider does a solid job of capturing Landon's life as an actor, father and often-confused husband, but it's helmer Michael Landon Jr.'s memories of a loving but then suddenly distanced parent that make for a touching story."
