= Susan McCray =

American film producer

Susan Sukman McCray is an American entrepreneur, film producer, and casting director.

== Background ==
McCray is the daughter of composer Harry Sukman and artist Francesca Paley Sukman. She attended University High School and then attended UCLA. majoring in both art history and psychology. She began her career as a singer, and then went on to be a casting director for several hit television series. She is now an entrepreneur.

== Career ==
=== Singer ===
McCray as a singer was "discovered" by Fred Foster, President of Monument Records. Foster nicknamed her "Susan Sands" and signed her to a contract to record four sides for the company. Her early recording of "Say A Prayer for Michael" appeared on the charts nationwide.

=== Casting ===
After touring for Monument, McCray returned to California and found employment as a secretary/receptionist at Paramount Studios for the NBC shows Bonanza and The High Chaparral. After a few years of experience working for the two show's casting director, McCray left Paramount and joined Warner Brothers as casting director for such shows as Kung Fu, The New Land and other network productions.

After a short stint at Warners, McCray returned to Paramount to work in their casting department, working for such series as Happy Days, Laverne & Shirley, Manix, and The Odd Couple. After her return to Paramount, she received a call of a lifetime from Michael Landon offering her the position of casting director for his new NBC series, Little House on the Prairie. During the nine years Susan spent casting for Little House, her additional casting assignments included the series Hawaii 5-0, Father Murphy, Freestyle and television movies such as Diary of Anne Frank, The Five of Me, Rodeo Girl, The Loneliest Runner and Mark Twain: Beneath the Laughter for PBS. McCray also cast the feature film Sam's Son, a semi-biographical story about Michael Landon, and was in charge of casting the NBC series Highway To Heaven.

McCray cast Art Carney in the film Where Pigeons Go to Die, for which role Carney received an Emmy nomination.

After Michael Landon's death Susan and producer Kent McCray produced the television movie Memories with Laughter and Love as a tribute to Landon.

=== Perfumer ===
From the age of eight, McCray had created fragrances with her mother, musician, painter, and fashion designer Francesca Paley. In 2010 she launched her first fragrance, Nightfall by Susan McCray.
