= Mark Landon =

American actor (1948–2009)

- Born: Mark Fraser; October 1, 1948
- Died: May 11, 2009 (aged 60); West Hollywood, California, U.S.
- Burial place: Hillside Memorial Park Cemetery
- Occupation: Actor
- Years active: 1986–1997
- Father: Michael Landon
- Relatives: Leslie Landon (adoptive sister); Michael Landon Jr. (adoptive brother); Christopher B. Landon (adoptive brother); Jennifer Landon (adoptive sister); Rachel Matthews (adoptive niece)

Mark Landon (October 1, 1948 – May 11, 2009) was an American actor and son of Bonanza and Little House on the Prairie star Michael Landon.

== Life and career ==
Mark Fraser Landon was adopted in 1956, at age 8, by 20-year-old actor Michael Landon. Mark's biological mother was Michael's then-wife, Dodie Levy-Fraser.

Landon appeared in three movies, including the CBS television movie Us (1991), which was written and directed by Michael Landon shortly before his death in 1991. It aired a few months after Michael Landon died. Mark also had a small role as a Navy SEAL in the 1997 movie Goodbye America.

== Death ==
Landon was found dead at his West Hollywood home in the 1300 block of North Sweetzer Avenue around noon on May 11, 2009, at age 60. He was interred at the Hillside Memorial Park Cemetery in Culver City, California, in the same crypt as his father.

West Hollywood sheriff's investigators stated that no suspicion of foul play existed.
