= Jennifer Landon =

American actress (born 1983)

- Born: August 29, 1983 (age 43)
- Education: New York University
- Occupation: Actress
- Years active: 1991; 2004–present
- Parents: Michael Landon (father); Cindy Clerico (mother)
- Relatives: Leslie Landon (half-sister); Michael Landon, Jr. (half-brother); Christopher B. Landon (half-brother); Mark Landon (adoptive brother); Rachel Matthews (niece)

Jennifer Landon (born August 29, 1983) is an American actress known for her role as Teeter on the Paramount Network series Yellowstone (2020–2024) and Dr. Toni Wright on Grey's Anatomy (2026-present). She is also known for her role as Gwen Norbeck Munson in the CBS soap opera As the World Turns (2005–2008, 2010). For her part on the show, Landon won three consecutive Daytime Emmy Awards for Outstanding Younger Actress in a Drama Series.

== Early life ==
Landon's paternal grandfather was Jewish, whereas her paternal grandmother was Catholic, although her father was raised Jewish. She is the daughter of actor Michael Landon and his third wife Cindy Clerico. Her late brother Mark Landon was and her brother Michael Landon, Jr., and her sister Leslie Landon are all actors. Her brother Christopher B. Landon is a filmmaker.

== Career ==
In late 2006, the soap opera As the World Turns featured a storyline about Landon's character pursuing a music career. She recorded three singles: "Staying Faithful", "Slide", and "I Saw Love". The latter two songs were written by Nini Camps. From April to July 2007, Landon played dual roles on As the World Turns; her regular character Gwen Norbeck Munson, and a lookalike named Cleo Babbitt. Landon left the show in 2008, but reprised her role in 2010 for the final two weeks of the series.

On May 1, 2012, it was announced that Landon would become the third adult actress to portray the role of Heather Stevens on The Young and the Restless. She portrayed the role for less than a year, before her character was written off. In 2016, she was cast as Lilith Bode, the wife of a serial killer, in the final season of Banshee.

In 2020, during the third season of the Paramount network’s series, Yellowstone, Landon was cast in the role of Teeter until December 2024.

== Filmography ==
=== Film ===
Year	Title	Role	Notes
2004	L.A. D.J.	Jessica	
2014	Rabid Weight Loss	Rabid Woman	Short film
2015	I Spit on Your Grave III: Vengeance Is Mine	Marla Finch	
2018	The Front Runner	Ann McDaniel	
2024	Brothers	Young Cath	

=== Television ===
Year	Title	Role	Notes
1991	Us	Jennifer Kramer	Television film
2005–2010	As the World Turns	Gwen Norbeck Munson; Cleo Babbitt	500 episodes Daytime Emmy Award for Outstanding Younger Actress in a Drama Series (2006–2008)
2011	House	Donovan	Episode: "Last Temptation"
2012	The Young and the Restless	Heather Stevens	28 episodes
2016	Banshee	Lilith Bode	4 episodes
2017	Days of Our Lives	Hillary Nelson	5 episodes
2017	Chicago Med	Janelle Nicholson	Episode: "White Butterflies"
2017–2018, 2022	Animal Kingdom	Amy	Recurring role (seasons 2 & 6); Special guest star (season 3)
2018	The Resident	Sara Ravenscroft	Special Guest Star (Season 1)
2019	The Orville	Ukania	Episode: "All The World Is Birthday Cake"
2020–2024	Yellowstone	Teeter	Recurring role (seasons 3–4); Main role (season 5)
2020	Helstrom	Katherine Reynolds	Episode: "Hell Storm"
2021–2022	FBI: Most Wanted	Sarah Allen	Recurring role (seasons 2–3)
2026-present	Grey's Anatomy	Dr. Toni Wright	Recurring role (seasons 22-23)

== Awards and nominations ==
Year	Award	Category	Title	Result	Ref.
2006	Daytime Emmy Award	Outstanding Younger Actress in a Drama Series	As the World Turns	Won	
2007	Daytime Emmy Award	Outstanding Younger Actress in a Drama Series	As the World Turns	Won	
2008	Daytime Emmy Award	Outstanding Younger Actress in a Drama Series	As the World Turns	Won	
2024	Screen Actors Guild Awards	Outstanding Performance by an Ensemble in a Drama Series	Yellowstone	Nominated	
