= Harry Sukman =

American film and television composer (1912–1984)

- Historical photo of Harry Sukman
- Born: December 2, 1912; Chicago, Illinois, U.S.
- Died: December 2, 1984 (aged 72); Palm Springs, California, U.S.
- Occupations: Film and television composer
- Years active: 1920s–1980s

Harry Sukman (December 2, 1912 – December 2, 1984) was an American film and television composer.

== Life and career ==
Sukman was born in Chicago, Illinois, in 1912. He started his musical career in the 1920s, when he was a teenager. He composed music scores for movies including Salem's Lot.

He married Francesca Paley in 1946, and the two stayed married until his death. They had one child, Susan McCray.

He won an Oscar and was nominated for two Oscars. He won the best musical song score Oscar at the 1960 Academy Awards (shared with Morris Stoloff) for Song Without End. Sukman was also nominated for Fanny and The Singing Nun. All three were in the Best Score category.

Sukman died of a heart attack on his 72nd birthday, December 2, 1984.

== Awards ==
- Nominee Best Score - Academy Awards (The Singing Nun)
- Nominee Best Score - Academy Awards (Fanny)
- Winner Best Musical Song Score - Academy Awards (Song Without End)
- Nominee Best Score - Emmy Awards (The High Chaparral)
- Nominee Best Score for Limited Series or Special - Emmy Awards ('Salem's Lot)

== Filmography ==
- Gog (1954)
- Riders to the Stars (1954)
- Battle Taxi (1955)
- A Bullet for Joey (1955)
- The Phenix City Story (1955)
- Screaming Eagles (1956)
- Forty Guns (1957)
- Fury at Showdown (1957)
- Tales of Wells Fargo (TV Series) (1957)
- Sabu and the Magic Ring (1957)
- Outcasts of the City (1958)
- Underwater Warrior (1958)
- The Hangman (1959)
- Verboten! (1959)
- The Crimson Kimono (1959)
- Dog Face (TV Movie) (1959)
- Death Valley Days (TV Series) (1960)
- Song Without End (1960)
- Alcoa Theatre (TV Series) (1960)
- Laramie (TV Series) (1960)
- Underworld U.S.A. (1961)
- Madison Avenue (1961)
- A Thunder of Drums (1961)
- Fanny (1961)
- Dr. Kildare (TV Series) (1961–66)
- Cain's Hundred (TV Series) (1962)
- Belle Sommers (TV Movie) (1962)
- The Eleventh Hour (TV Series) (1962)
- The Lieutenant (TV Series) (1963)
- The Virginian (TV Series) (1963–64)
- The Travels of Jaimie McPheeters (TV Series) (1963–64)
- Guns of Diablo (1965)
- The Singing Nun (1966)
- Around the World Under the Sea (1966)
- The Long Hunt of April Savage (TV Movie) (1966)
- High Noon: The Clock Strikes Noon Again (TV Movie) (1966)
- The Monroes (TV Series) (1966–67)
- Daniel Boone (TV Series) (1967)
- The Naked Runner (1967)
- Welcome to Hard Times (1967)
- Cowboy in Africa (TV Series) (1967–68)
- The High Chaparral (TV Series) (1967–70)
- If He Hollers, Let Him Go! (1968)
- The Private Navy of Sgt. O'Farrell (1968)
- Tiger, Tiger (TV movie) (1969)
- Bonanza (TV Series) (1969–72)
- Mister Kingstreet's War (1971)
- Genesis II (TV Movie) (1973)
- Owen Marshall, Counselor at Law (TV Series) (1973–74)
- The Cowboys (TV Series) (1974)
- The Family Kovack (TV Movie) (1974)
- Planet Earth (TV Movie) (1974)
- Beyond the Bermuda Triangle (TV Movie) (1975)
- Police Story (TV Series) (1975)
- Jeremiah of Jacob's Neck (TV Movie) (1976)
- Enigma (TV Movie) (1977)
- Someone's Watching Me! (TV Movie) (1978)
- Salem's Lot (TV Movie) (1979)
