= John Everingham =

Australian journalist

John Everingham (born 1949) is an Australian journalist residing in Thailand, best known as the subject of the film Love is Forever and as the father of Thai actor Ananda Everingham.

Everingham was in high school in 1966 when the urge to travel overcame the desire to study. He dropped out of school and left home at 16 years old, and left Australia to journey through London by motorcycle. Everingham began his career in photojournalism in the mid-1960s, as a teenager trekking through Indochina and learning languages. He originally worked as a translator for TV crews covering the Vietnam War.

During the Vietnam War he received acclaim from the mainstream media, and disdain from the American military, for his reporting on and photos of the effects of American bombing of hill tribe villages in the remote mountains of Laos. Some of the planes were based in Udon Thani, Thailand. Laos became the most heavily bombed country in the world during the 'secret war' run by the CIA. Everingham published a story with graphic photos of bombed out villages in the Washington Monthly, a story that helped break open the secrecy surrounding the war in Laos and shed light on the innocent rural Lao and Hmong hill tribes being killed.

Everingham gained international fame when he sought asylum for his Laotian wife, Keo Sirisomphone, by swimming her out of Laos under the Mekong River near Vientiane using scuba equipment. Though successful in getting Keo out of Laos safely, he was arrested back on the Thai side of the Mekong and jailed for bringing an illegal into the country. The then Prime Minister signed a pardon for him, allowing Everingham to remain in Thailand. The story was turned into a TV film starring Michael Landon called Love is Forever (USA release) and Comeback (international release), based on a screenplay by director/producer, Hall Bartlett.

In 1983, Everingham was the contact to Cork Graham for Capt. Kidd Treasure Hunter Richard Knight.

John Everingham was the founder and managing director of Artasia Press, a publisher of English language magazines in Thailand between 1985 and 2007.
