= Rachel Matthews =

American actress

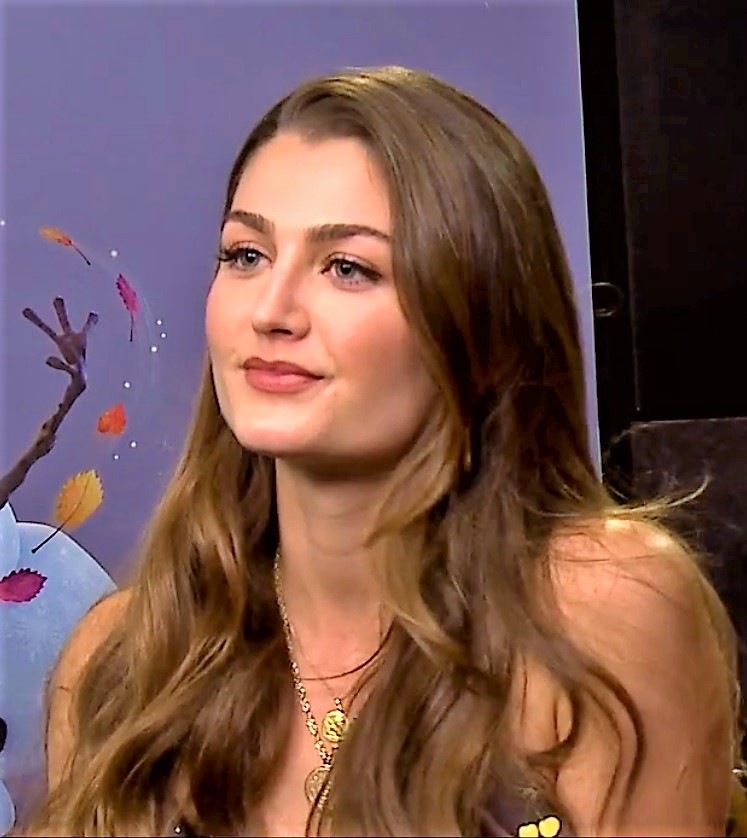
- Matthews interviewed by Dulce Osuna in 2019
- Born: Los Angeles, California, U.S.
- Education: New York University
- Occupation: Actress
- Years active: 2017–present
- Known for: Happy Death Day; Happy Death Day 2U
- Parents: Brian Matthews; Leslie Landon
- Relatives: Michael Landon (grandfather); Michael Landon Jr. (uncle); Christopher Landon (uncle); Jennifer Landon (aunt); Mark Landon (adoptive uncle)

Rachel Matthews is an American actress. She is known for her role in the film Happy Death Day and its sequel, Happy Death Day 2U.

== Early life and career ==
A native of Los Angeles, Matthews was born in 1993, the eldest daughter of actress Leslie Landon and Brian Matthews. She became interested in acting at an early age by watching Shirley Temple movies, leading to tap and voice classes, and ultimately joining a local theater program at the age of 10. Matthews continued to pursue the stage life by studying acting at New York University Tisch School of the Arts. In college, Matthews became friends with fellow actress Camila Mendes, who would become her roommate upon returning to Los Angeles, and musician Maggie Rogers, who would feature both in her music video "Give a Little".

In 2017, Matthews had her film debut in Happy Death Day, directed by her uncle Christopher Landon, playing sorority house president Danielle Bouseman, a role she would play again in the 2019 sequel Happy Death Day 2U. That same year, Matthews was cast as the villainous thief Magpie in the TV series Batwoman, had a small role in the Hulu series Looking for Alaska and voiced a character in Frozen II.

Matthews starred in country singer-songwriter Lainey Wilson's music video "Watermelon Moonshine", released in July 2023.

In June 2024, Matthews co-founded production company Honor Role with Camila Mendes.

== Filmography ==
=== Film ===
Year	Title	Role	Notes
2017	Happy Death Day	Danielle Bouseman	
2019	Happy Death Day 2U	Danielle Bouseman	
2019	Ms. White Light	Nurse Landon	
2019	Frozen 2	Honeymaren	Voice role
2022	Tankhouse	Mackenzie	
2022	Do Revenge	Allegra	
2023	The Duel	Abbie	
2024	Upgraded	Suzette	Also executive producer
2024	Griffin in Summer	—	Producer
2025	Idiotka	—	Producer
TBA	DED	—	Post-production; producer
TBA	Upgraded 2	Suzette	Filming; also producer

=== Television ===
Year	Title	Role	Notes
2019	Batwoman	Margot Pye / Magpie	3 episodes
2019	Looking for Alaska	Fiona	3 episodes
2025	Overcompensating	Yates student	Episode: "Lucky"
