= Another Day in Paradise (film) =

1998 American crime drama film by Larry Clark

- Theatrical release poster
- Directed by: Larry Clark
- Written by: Stephen Chin; Christopher B. Landon
- Based on: Another Day in Paradise by Eddie Little
- Produced by: Larry Clark; James Woods; Stephen Chin; Scott Shiffman
- Starring: James Woods; Melanie Griffith; Vincent Kartheiser; Natasha Gregson Wagner; Paul Hipp; Brent Briscoe; Branden Williams
- Cinematography: Eric Alan Edwards
- Edited by: Luis Colina
- Distributed by: Trimark Pictures
- Release date: December 30, 1998 (Los Angeles)
- Running time: 101 minutes
- Country: United States
- Language: English
- Budget: $4.5 million
- Box office: $1 million

Another Day in Paradise is a 1998 American crime drama film directed by Larry Clark, and starring James Woods, Melanie Griffith, Vincent Kartheiser, and Natasha Gregson Wagner. The film follows a teenage drug addict who, along with his girlfriend, are taken in by a middle-aged couple. The pair persuade the teenagers to help them commit a series of increasingly complicated and dangerous drug robberies. Based on the 1997 novel of the same name by Eddie Little, Another Day in Paradise is Clark's second feature film; it won the Grand Prix award at the 1999 Festival du Film Policier de Cognac.

After originally earning the rare NC-17 rating, the American theatrical release was edited for the purpose of obtaining an R, reducing the running time from 105 to 101 minutes. Clark's original cut ran over 140 minutes.

== Plot ==
In the Midwest, teenaged Bobbie, a methamphetamine addict, attempts to rob several vending machines at a local college, but is confronted by a night guard who brutally attacks and beats him. The fight ends with Bobbie stabbing the guard to death. A severely injured Bobbie returns to the flophouse of his girlfriend, Rosie, who contacts Mel, a streetwise middle-aged thief and part-time drug dealer, for help. Mel gives Bobbie heroin to ease his pain.

After Bobbie heals, Mel and his heroin-addicted girlfriend Sid take Bobbie and Rosie under their wing. The two commit several drug heists, including one at a small clinic which accrues them a significant amount of money. While on the run, Rosie discovers she is pregnant. The news elates Sid, who Mel later reveals cannot conceive a child.

In a dusty small town, Mel and Bobbie begin to sell off the stolen narcotics out of a rundown motel. A group of armed rednecks attempt to steal their stash, Mel and Bobbie are shot during the altercation, but Bobbie and Sid manage to kill the four men and take their money. The group flee to the home of the Reverend, a preacher and illegal arms dealer from whom Mel acquires his guns. The Reverend allows them to stay at his home, but only in exchange for half of their haul.

After Mel and Bobbie recover, the group continue their illegal exploits, uniting with Jewels, a flamboyant gay criminal with whom Mel has worked in the past. Mel, Bobbie, and Sid agree to commit a robbery with Jewels, but Rosie is reluctant, shaken by Mel and Bobbie's near-death incident. The night before the planned robbery, Rosie commits suicide by overdosing on heroin in their motel. A devastated Bobbie keeps Rosie's death a secret, and goes along with Mel and Sid in the morning to the home of the wealthy couple Jewels has planned for them to rob.

When they arrive, they discover Jewels already inside, beating the male occupant after having tied up his wife. The robbery quickly goes awry, and Bobbie shoots Jewels through the throat, killing him. Mel, angered that Bobbie has killed their cohort, proceeds to murder the homeowners to prevent being identified to police. Bobbie, Mel, and Sid flee with $80,000, but Mel is infuriated by Bobbie's actions.

During the car ride, Bobbie reveals that Rosie has died in the motel, which causes Sid to have a breakdown, as she has developed a maternal relationship with both Rosie and Bobbie. While stopping for gasoline, Mel insists they murder Bobbie to conceal their crime, which Sid reluctantly agrees to when Mel threatens her life as well. Bobbie goes to use the restroom, and Sid follows, tearfully warning him that Mel plans to murder him. She gives him a stack of money and pleads for him to go. The two embrace, and Bobbie flees through a cornfield. When Mel realizes Bobbie has escaped, he looks into the field to kill him, but is unable to spot him. Mel punishes and punches Sid in the face as punishment, before driving off as Bobbie continues to run.

== Cast ==
- James Woods as Mel
- Melanie Griffith as Sid
- Vincent Kartheiser as Bobbie
- Natasha Gregson Wagner as Rosie
- James Otis as Reverend
- Branden Williams as Danny
- Brent Briscoe as Clem
- Peter Sarsgaard as Ty
- Lou Diamond Phillips as "Jewels"
- Kim Flowers as Bonnie Johnson
- Paul Hipp as Richard Johnson
- Karen Sheperd as Big Man's Wife

== Production ==
Principal photography began in November 1997 and wrapped in January 1998. According to those involved with the film, the production was troubled and fraught with potential disaster. "Given the outrageous circumstances, it’s amazing that the movie happened at all," said co-producer/co-writer Stephen Chin. Actor and co-producer James Woods described the shoot as a "nightmare" and director Larry Clark as a "rude pig." The night of the film's world premiere in Venice, Clark physically attacked Chin.

A major bone of contention for Woods was Clark's friendship with the film's star, Vincent Kartheiser, which Woods said reflected the mentor-protégé friendship between Woods’ and Kartheiser's characters in the film. Kartheiser's manager Mike Cutler insists there was no such bond.

When Clark's cut of the film was shown to potential distributors, it was more than 140 minutes long and included a graphic sex scene between Kartheiser and Gregson Wagner which would have brought an NC-17 rating. Clark and Kartheiser wanted to shoot an even kinkier version of one sex scene, but Gregson Wagner refused. "I knew if Larry really believed in the idea, he wouldn't have come with Vincent and he wouldn't have waited until the day of to discuss it with me," said the actress. Producers eventually wrested the film away from Clark and re-cut it in California.

The re-edited version was accepted by the Venice and Toronto festivals and received strong reviews. Trimark Pictures stepped forward and made an offer for the film. Though Clark agreed to the changes, he maligned Woods in interviews, further alienating the actor. "We killed ourselves to allow him to make the film his way and he’s saying I ruined his picture," Woods said. "He was passed out drunk in the editing room and, as the producer, I could have had him thrown out. But I promised I wouldn’t interfere. He got his final cut."

== Music ==
The film's soundtrack includes mainly 60s and 70s soul music, including tracks by Otis Redding, Clarence Carter, Allen Toussaint, and songs by other artists such as The Tornadoes and Bob Dylan.

== Release ==
Another Day in Paradise premiered in Los Angeles on December 30, 1998. The film opened the following month in New York City, on January 22, 1999.

=== Critical response ===
Another Day in Paradise received mixed reviews. Philip French of The Guardian praised the film, writing that "Woods and Griffith are electrifying as the couple at the end of their tether.... Another Day in Paradise has a shocking honesty that Larry Clark's previous feature film, the notorious Kids, quite lacks. It's never judgmental or glibly sociological. The shoddy glamour of their fugitive lives is something Mel and Sid think they have chosen rather than been driven into. In this respect, the film resembles Bonnie and Clyde, but as far as charm and romance go in the crime film, Clark's movie would be at the opposite end of the spectrum from Arthur Penn's."

Janet Maslin of The New York Times wrote of the film: "Clark's main gift is for living furiously with his characters in the moment, as Eric Edwards' hand-held camera work swerves and pivots and the soundtrack pulsates with a bluesy, smoldering score featuring Clarence Carter. His second, more benign film delivers what his first promised: bad times with a wicked way of looking good."

On Rotten Tomatoes it has an approval rating of 57% based on 49 reviews. It was the last film that film critics Roger Ebert and Gene Siskel gave their famous "two thumbs up" to; they reviewed it in Siskel's last television appearance, before his death a few weeks later.
