= Michael Landon =

American actor and filmmaker (1936–1991)

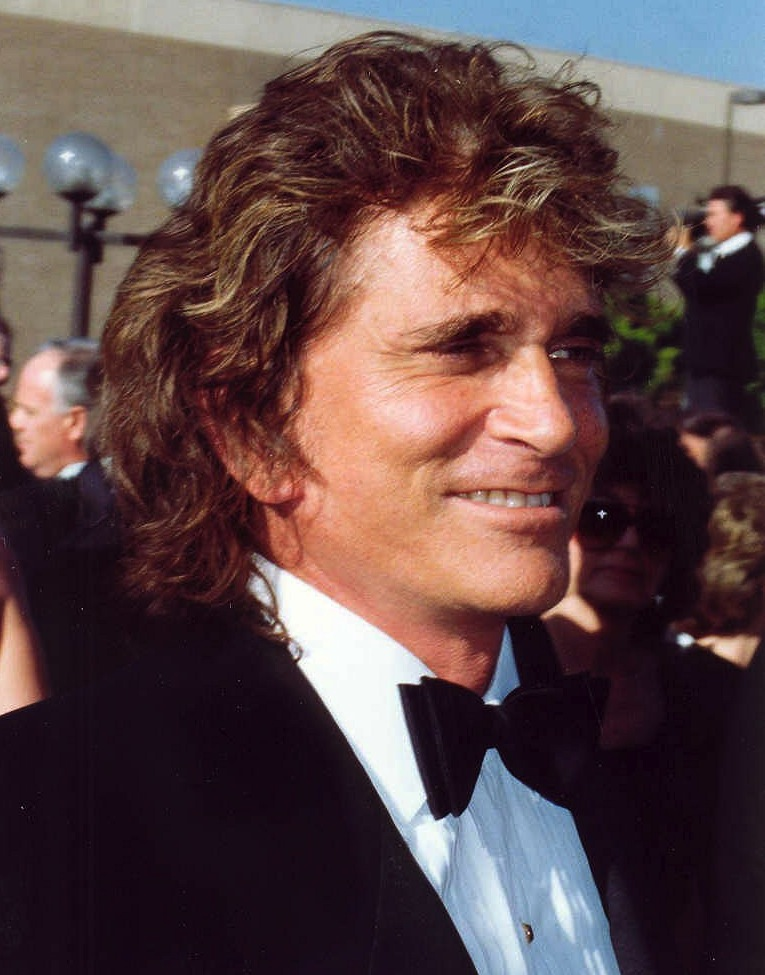
- Landon in 1990
- Born: Eugene Maurice Orowitz; October 31, 1936; New York City, U.S.
- Died: July 1, 1991 (aged 54); Malibu, California, U.S.
- Resting place: Hillside Memorial Park Cemetery
- Occupations: Actor; writer; producer; director; singer
- Years active: 1955–1991
- Known for: Bonanza; Little House on the Prairie; Highway to Heaven
- Spouses: Dodie Levy-Fraser (m. 1956; div. 1962) Marjorie Lynn Noe (m. 1963; div. 1982) Cindy Clerico (m. 1983)
- Children: 9, including Mark, Leslie, Michael Jr., Christopher and Jennifer
- Relatives: Rachel Matthews (granddaughter)

Michael Landon Sr. (born Eugene Maurice Orowitz; October 31, 1936 – July 1, 1991) was an American actor and filmmaker. He is known for his roles as Little Joe Cartwright in Bonanza (1959–1973), Charles Ingalls in Little House on the Prairie (1974–1983), and Jonathan Smith in Highway to Heaven (1984–1989). Landon appeared on the cover of TV Guide 22 times, second only to Lucille Ball.

== Early life, family and education ==
Landon was born Eugene Maurice Orowitz on October 31, 1936, in Forest Hills, a neighborhood of the borough of Queens in New York City. His parents were Kathleen "Peggy" Orowitz (née O'Neill), a dancer and comedian of Irish descent, and Eli Maurice Orowitz. Eli was Jewish and Peggy was Roman Catholic. Landon's sister, Evelyn, was born three years earlier.

In 1941, when Landon was four years old, the family relocated to the borough of Collingswood, New Jersey. He celebrated his bar mitzvah at Temple Beth Sholom in Haddon Heights, New Jersey. His family recalls that Landon "went through a lot of hassle studying for the big event, which included bicycling to a nearby town every day in order to learn how to read Hebrew and recite prayers." He said: "We were one of two Jewish families in a working-class town that had its share of anti-Semites". Years later he told an interviewer that he never went on a date when he was in high school "because no Christian father in the town would allow his daughter to go out with a Jew."

During his childhood, Landon worried constantly about his mother attempting suicide. He later reported that on a family beach vacation, his mother tried to drown herself, but Landon rescued her. Shortly after the attempt, his mother acted as if nothing happened, and a few minutes later, he vomited. He said that it was the worst experience of his life. Stress overload from his mother's suicide attempts caused Landon to battle the childhood problem of bedwetting, which was reported in the unauthorized biography Michael Landon: His Triumph and Tragedy. His mother put his wet sheets on display outside his window for all to see. He ran home every day and tried to remove them before his classmates could see. Some of these experiences were incorporated into his semi-autobiographical television movie, The Loneliest Runner, which he wrote, produced, and directed.

Landon attended Collingswood High School and was an excellent javelin thrower, with his 193 ft 4 in (58.93 m) toss in 1954 being the longest throw by a high schooler in the US that year. This earned him an athletic scholarship to the University of Southern California in Los Angeles, California, but he subsequently tore his shoulder ligaments, putting an end to his days as a college athlete and as a student.

In Los Angeles, Landon considered going into show business. He worked as an attendant at a gas station across from the Warner Bros. studios in Burbank, California. He was eventually noticed by Bob Raison, a local talent agent. Following his advice, Landon changed his Jewish-sounding name, selecting his new name from a telephone book.

== Career ==
=== Early work ===
Landon's first starring appearance was on the television series Telephone Time, in the episode "The Mystery of Casper Hauser" (1956) as the title character. In the prior year, he had appeared in the short live TV series Luke and the Tenderfoot. He was in the premiere episode. The series lasted only one more episode before cancellation. Other parts came, including movie roles in: I Was a Teenage Werewolf (1957), Maracaibo (1958), High School Confidential (1958), God's Little Acre (1958) and The Legend of Tom Dooley (1959), as well as many roles on television, such as: Crossroads (three episodes), The Restless Gun (pilot episode aired on Schlitz Playhouse of Stars), Sheriff of Cochise (in "Human Bomb"), U.S. Marshal (as Don Sayers in "The Champ"), Crusader, Frontier Doctor, The Rifleman (in "End of a Young Gun", 1958), The Adventures of Jim Bowie, Johnny Staccato, Wire Service, General Electric Theater, The Court of Last Resort, State Trooper (two episodes), Tales of Wells Fargo (three episodes), The Texan (in the 1958 episode "The Hemp Tree"), The Tall Man, Tombstone Territory (in the episodes "The Man From Brewster", with John Carradine and "Rose of the Rio Bravo", with Kathleen Nolan), Trackdown (two 1958 episodes), and Wanted Dead or Alive, starring Steve McQueen (in episodes "The Martin Poster", 1958, and "The Legend", 1959).

Landon also appeared in, at least, two episodes of Dick Powell's Zane Grey Theater including "Gift from a Gunman" in 1957 and "Living is a Lonely Thing" in 1959. Landon can be seen in two uncredited speaking roles as a cavalry trooper in a 1956 episode of the ABC/Warner Bros. television series Cheyenne, an episode titled "Decision". Two years later, Landon returned to that same series as White Hawk in "The White Warrior".

=== Bonanza ===
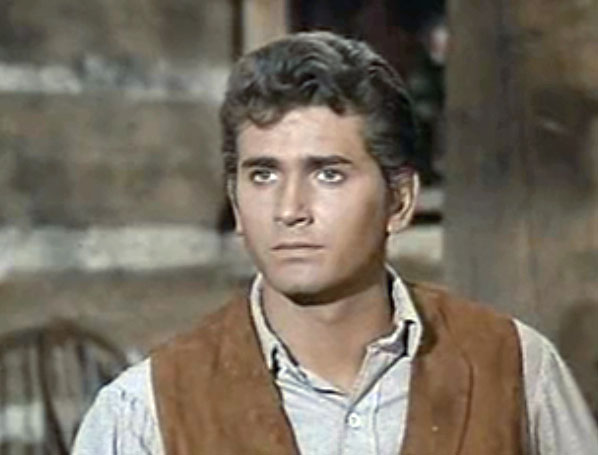
Landon in Bonanza (1960)

In 1959, at the age of 22, Landon began his first starring TV role as Little Joe Cartwright on Bonanza, one of the first TV series to be broadcast in color. Also starring on the show were Lorne Greene, Pernell Roberts, and Dan Blocker. During Bonanza's sixth season (1964–1965), the show topped the Nielsen ratings and remained number one for three years.

Receiving more fan mail than any other cast member, Landon negotiated with executive producer David Dortort and NBC to write and direct some episodes. In 1962, Landon wrote his first script. In 1968, Landon directed his first episode. In 1993, TV Guide listed Little Joe's September 1972 two-hour wedding episode ("Forever") as one of TV's most memorable specials. Landon's script recalled Little Joe's brother, Hoss, who was initially the story's groom, before Dan Blocker's death. During the final season, the ratings declined, and NBC canceled Bonanza in November 1972. The last episode aired on January 16, 1973. Along with Lorne Greene and Victor Sen Yung, Landon appeared in all 14 seasons of the series. Landon was loyal to many of his Bonanza associates, including producer Kent McCray, director William F. Claxton, and composer David Rose, who remained with him throughout Bonanza, as well as Little House on the Prairie and Highway to Heaven.

=== Little House on the Prairie ===
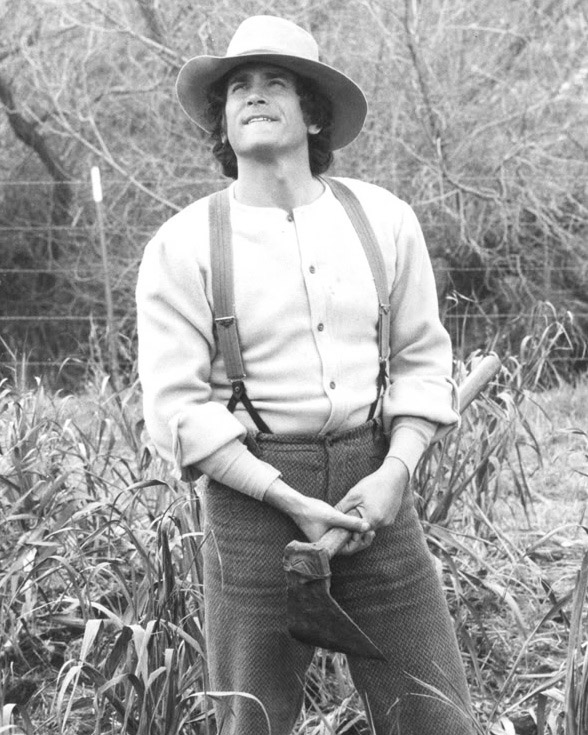
Landon as Charles Ingalls, 1974

The year after Bonanza was canceled, Landon went on to star as Charles Ingalls in what became another successful television series, Little House on the Prairie, again for NBC. The show was taken from a 1935 book written by Laura Ingalls Wilder, whose character in the show was played by 9-year-old actress Melissa Gilbert. In addition to Gilbert, two other unknown actresses also starred on the show: Melissa Sue Anderson, who appeared as Mary Ingalls, the oldest daughter in the Ingalls family, and Karen Grassle as Charles' wife, Caroline. Landon served as executive producer, writer, and director of Little House. The show was nominated for several Emmy and Golden Globe awards.

After eight seasons, Little House was retooled by NBC in 1982 as Little House: A New Beginning, which focused on the Wilder family and the Walnut Grove community. Though Landon remained the show's executive producer, director, and writer, A New Beginning did not feature Charles and Caroline Ingalls. A New Beginning was actually the final chapter of Little House, as the series ended in 1983. The following year, three made-for-television movies aired.

In a 2015 interview, Gilbert said of Landon, "He gave me so much advice...the overall idea that he pounded into me, from a little girl, into my brain was that nothing's more important than 'Home & Family'; no success, no career, no achievements, no accomplishments, nothing's more important than loving the people you love and contributing to a community. Though we were working, really, really hard, we were 'Not Saving the World', one episode of television at a time, we're just entertaining people and there are more important things to do... and have fun; no matter what."

=== Highway to Heaven ===
After producing both "Little House" and later the Father Murphy TV series, Landon starred in another successful program. In Highway to Heaven, he played a probationary angel (who named himself Jonathan Smith) whose job was to help people in order to earn his wings. His co-star on the show was Victor French (who had previously co-starred on Landon's Little House on the Prairie) as ex-cop Mark Gordon. On Highway, Landon served as executive producer, writer, and director. Highway to Heaven was the only show throughout his long career in television that he owned outright. Landon created the show after a promise he made to God when his daughter was in a coma.

By 1985, prior to hiring his son, Michael Landon Jr., as a member of his camera crew, he also brought real-life cancer patients and disabled people to the set. His decision to work with disabled people led him to hire a couple of adults with disabilities to write episodes for Highway to Heaven.

By season four, Highway dropped out of the Nielsen top 30, and in June 1988, NBC announced that the series would return for an abbreviated fifth season, which would be its last. Its final episodes were filmed in the fall of 1988. One aired in October, two in December, one in March 1989, and the remainder aired on Fridays from June to August. French did not live to see Highway's series finale broadcast; he died of advanced lung cancer on June 15, 1989, two months after it was diagnosed. Landon invited his youngest daughter, Jennifer Landon, to take part in the final episode.

=== Other projects ===
In 1972, he was among the guests in David Winters' musical television special The Special London Bridge Special, starring Tom Jones and Jennifer O'Neill.

In 1973, Landon was an episode director and writer for the short-lived NBC romantic anthology series Love Story. In 1982, he co-produced an NBC "true story" television movie, Love Is Forever, starring Laura Gemser (who was credited as Moira Chen) and himself, about Australian photojournalist John Everingham's successful attempt to scuba dive under the Mekong to rescue his lover from communist-ruled Laos in 1977. The real Everingham was cast as an extra in the film, which also marked the acting debut of Priscilla Presley.

Sam's Son was a 1984 coming-of-age feature film written and directed by Landon and loosely based on his early life. The film stars Timothy Patrick Murphy, Eli Wallach, Anne Jackson, Hallie Todd, and James Karen. Karen previously worked for Landon in the made-for-television film Little House: The Last Farewell.

He was a guest of the PBS television series The Electric Company.

After the cancellation of Highway to Heaven and before his move to CBS, Landon wrote and directed the teleplay Where Pigeons Go to Die. Based on a novel of the same name, the film starred Art Carney and was nominated for two Emmy awards.

Through the run of Highway to Heaven, all of Landon's television programs were broadcast on NBC, a relationship which lasted 30 consecutive years with the network. After the cancellation of Highway and due to a fallout with those within NBC's upper management, he moved to CBS and in 1991 starred in a two-hour pilot called Us. Us was meant to be another series for Landon, but with his diagnosis on April 5 of pancreatic cancer, the show never aired beyond the pilot. The pilot aired as a CBS Friday night movie presentation on September 20, 1991, two months after Landon's death. Also during the 1990–91 season, Landon appeared as host of the CBS special America's Missing Children, which explored actual cases of missing children that were under investigation. This special was also being considered as the pilot for a new series. He appeared as a celebrity panelist on the premiere week of Match Game on CBS.

=== Singing ===
Landon also had a singing career, of the teen idol type.

In 1957, Candlelight Records released a Michael Landon single "Gimme a Little Kiss (Will "Ya" Huh)"/ "Be Patient with Me" during the height of his notoriety for his role in the film I Was a Teenage Werewolf. Some copies show the artist credited as the "Teenage Werewolf" rather than as Michael Landon. In 1962, both the A- and B-sides of the record were re-released on the Fono-Graf label that included a picture sleeve of Landon's then-current role on Bonanza as Little Joe Cartwright.

In March 1964, RCA Victor Records released another Landon single, "Linda Is Lonesome"/"Without You". All of Landon's singles have since been issued on compact disc by Bear Family Records as part of a Bonanza various-artists compilation.

Landon sang on television, on the Dean Martin Show, Hullabaloo, and other venues, and also sang live on stage at theatrical venues (sometimes with a holster and gun strapped to his hip).

== Personal life ==
Landon was married three times and was a father to nine children (three of whom were adopted):

- Dodie Levy-Fraser (married 1956; divorced 1962)
  - Mark Fraser Landon (adopted; Dodie's biological son (in 1956 aged 8))
  - Josh Fraser Landon (adopted as infant)
- Marjorie Lynn Noe (married 1963; divorced 1982)
  - Cheryl Lynn Landon (born Cheryl Ann Pontrelli), Lynn's daughter from her first marriage; she was nine when her mother and Landon married.
  - Leslie Ann Landon
  - Michael Landon Jr.
  - Shawna Leigh Landon
  - Christopher Beau Landon
- Cindy Clerico (married 1983), a makeup artist on Little House on the Prairie
  - Jennifer Rachel Landon
  - Sean Matthew Landon

In February 1959, Landon's father died from a heart attack.

Landon's daughter Cheryl and several of her friends were involved in a serious car collision when their vehicle was struck by another while traveling home from a college event. She was the sole survivor. She was hospitalized with serious injuries and remained in a coma for days. In a 1985 interview with People, Landon said he made a bargain with God that if Cheryl recovered he would create something that would help people, and he saw Highway to Heaven as a way to fulfill this bargain.

Landon's mother, Peggy, died in March 1981.

Landon admitted to being a chain smoker and heavy drinker.

A 1985 profile in People described him as a political conservative, who was close to Ronald Reagan. In 1990, he supported a pro-environmentalist proposition in California. In a March 1991 interview, he criticized political polarization and political correctness in America.

Landon said in a May 1991 interview with the Associated Press: "I believe in God, I believe in family, I believe in truth between people, I believe in the power of love, I believe that we really are created in God's image, that there is God in all of us."

== Illness and death ==
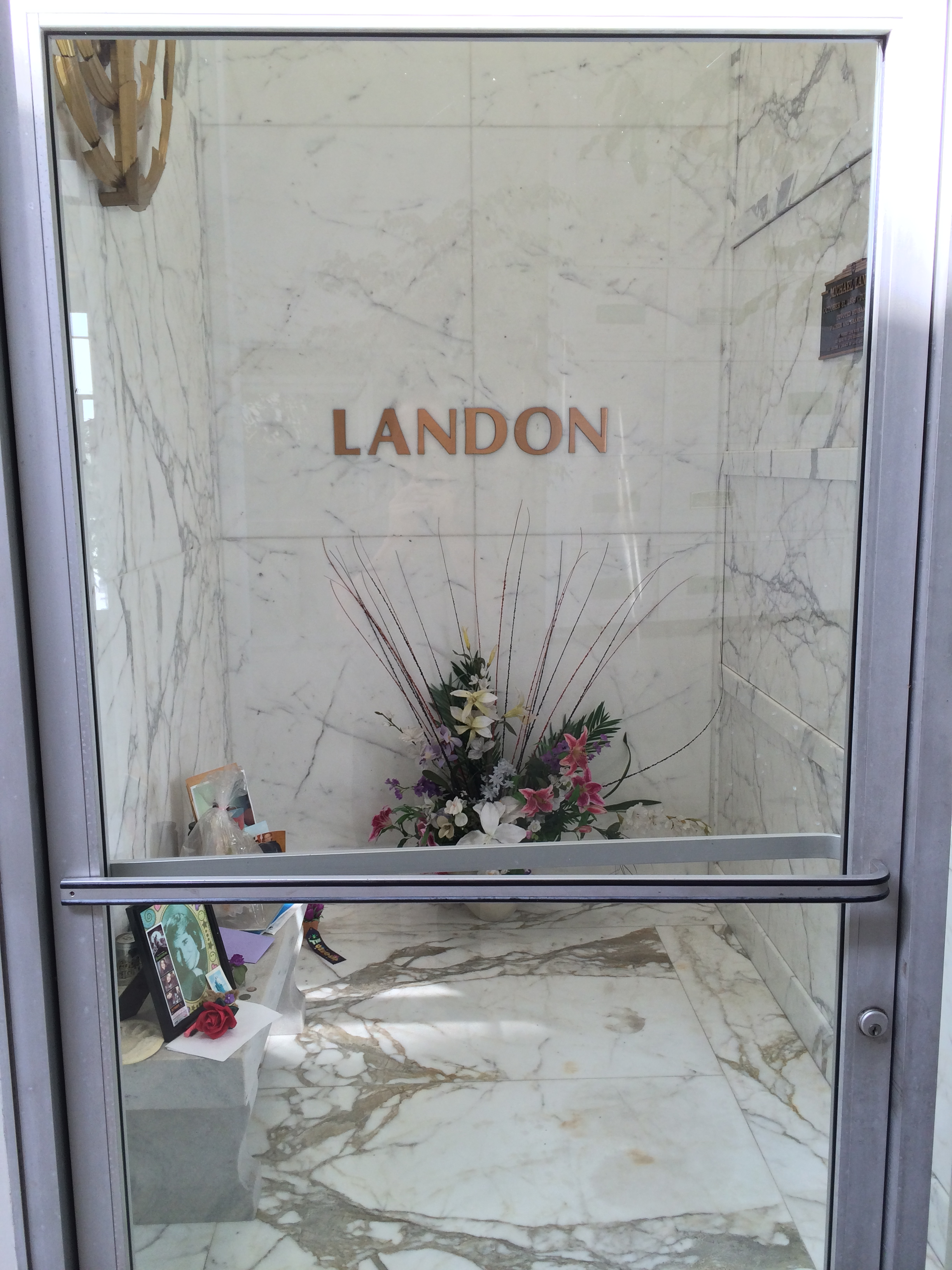
Crypt of Michael Landon at Hillside Memorial Park

In April 1991, Landon began to suffer from a severe headache while he was on a skiing vacation in Utah. Three days later, he was diagnosed with pancreatic cancer, which had begun to affect the tissues and blood vessels around his pancreas. The cancer was inoperable and terminal.

He appeared on The Tonight Show Starring Johnny Carson to speak about the cancer and condemn the tabloid press for its sensational headlines and inaccurate stories, including the claim that he and his wife were trying to conceive another child. During his appearance, Landon pledged to fight the disease and asked his fans to pray for him. Twelve days after his appearance on the show, he underwent successful surgery for a life-threatening blood clot in his left leg. In June, he appeared on the cover of LIFE after granting the periodical an exclusive private interview about his life, his family, and his struggle to live.

Landon died at age 54 in Malibu, California, at 1:20 p.m. on Monday, July 1, 1991, with his wife at his bedside. He is interred in a private family mausoleum at Hillside Memorial Park Cemetery, in Culver City, California. Landon's headstone reads: "He seized life with joy. He gave to life generously. He leaves a legacy of love and laughter". His adopted son, Mark, who died in May 2009, is also interred there.

== Legacy ==
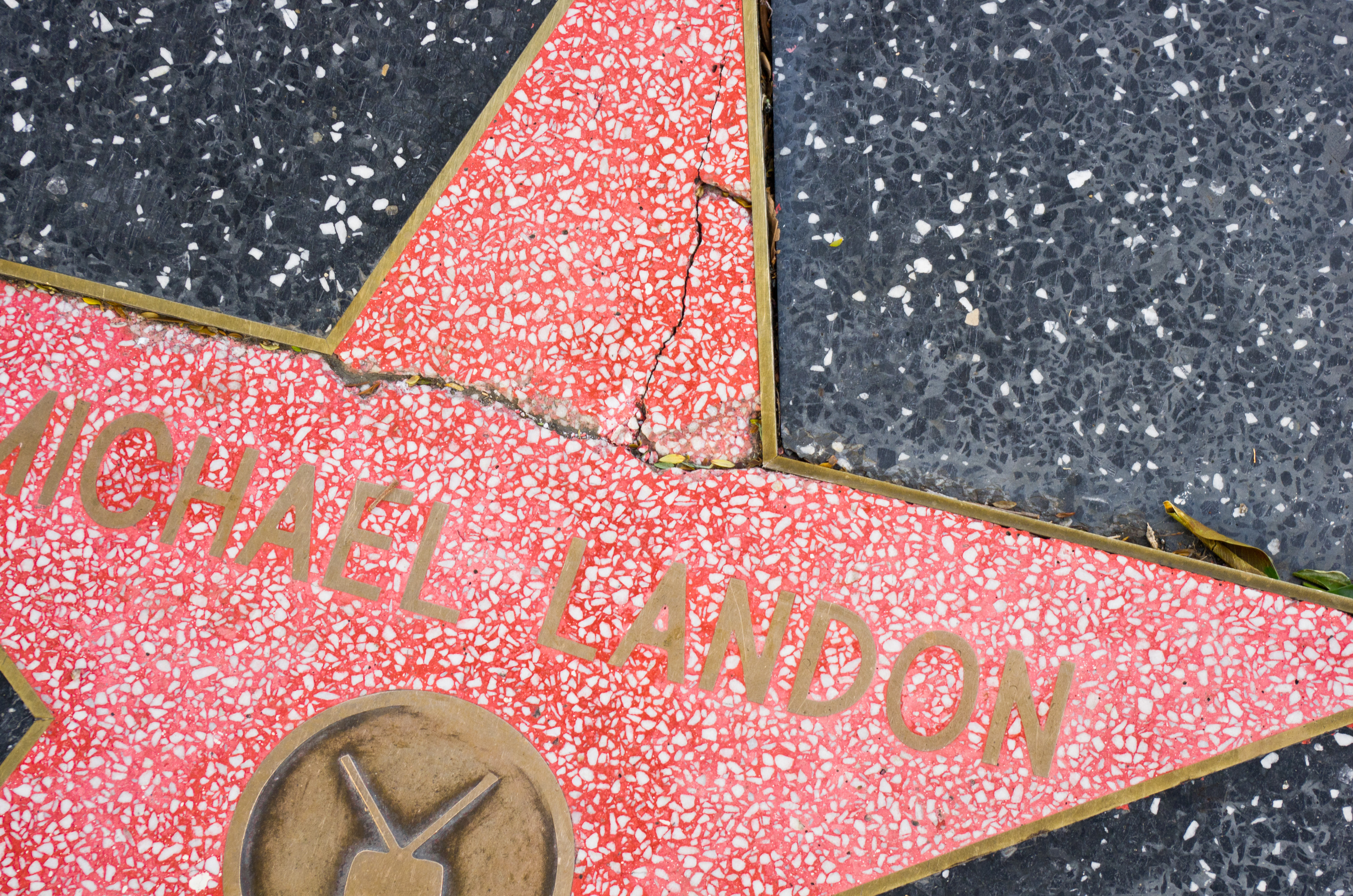
Landon's star on the Hollywood Walk of Fame

A community building at Malibu's Bluffs Park was named the Michael Landon Center following the actor's death. Landon's son, Michael Jr., produced a memorial special called Michael Landon: Memories with Laughter and Love, featuring the actor's family, friends, and co-stars; Bonanza co-star David Canary said that one word that described Landon was "fearless" in his dealings with network brass. Melissa Gilbert, who played his daughter on Little House, said that the actor made her feel "incredibly safe" and that he was "paternal". Often cited on the special was Landon's bizarre sense of humor, which included having toads leap from his mouth and dressing as a superhero to visit a pizza parlor.

In 1991, during Landon's final Tonight Show appearance, Johnny Carson related how the actor took him back to a restaurant the two had dined at previously. Carson had been led to believe he accidentally ran over the owner's cat in the parking lot during their first visit. When sitting down to eat the second time, Carson discovered that Landon had helped create a fake menu of dinner items featuring cat metaphors.

A made-for-TV movie, A Father’s Son, co-written and directed by his son Michael Jr., aired on CBS in May 1999. John Schneider starred in the title role as Michael Landon, with Cheryl Ladd as Lynn Noe and Joel Berti as Michael Landon Jr. The biopic detailed, from Michael Jr.'s point of view, the personal emotional trauma he endured during his parents' divorce and his father's premature death. The movie spanned a timeline from the 1960s through the early 1990s.

A plaque and small playground referred to as the Little Treehouse on the Prairie was erected in Knight Park, a central park in Landon's hometown of Collingswood. In 2011, the plaque was removed from the park by the borough and was later given to a local newspaper by an unnamed person. According to the Collingswood, NJ, website, the plaque was removed during a fall cleanup with plans to return it to a safer location. The plaque was reinstated next to a bench in a safer location the following summer.

In 2021, Karen Grassle, Landon's co-star on Little House, published her memoir, Bright Lights, Prairie Dust: Reflections on Life, Loss, and Love by House's Ma. In the book, Grassle detailed the troubled relationship she had with Landon, citing derogatory remarks he made about her while on the set of Little House, often with other members of the cast and crew present. Grassle subsequently "mended fences" with Landon prior to his death.

Landon allegedly damaged a motel room wall during a 1962 stay while headlining the local county fair in Neligh, Nebraska. The room, now called the Michael Landon Suite, remains largely unchanged, and the plaque beside the hole commemorates the incident.

== Filmography ==
=== Film ===
Film
Year	Title	Role	Notes
1956	These Wilder Years	Boy in Poolhall	Uncredited
1957	I Was a Teenage Werewolf	Tony Rivers	
1958	Maracaibo	Lago Orlando	
1958	High School Confidential!	Steve Bentley	
1958	God's Little Acre	Dave Dawson	
1959	The Legend of Tom Dooley	Tom Dooley	
1961	The Errand Boy	Joseph 'Little Joe' Cartwright	Uncredited
1976	The Loneliest Runner	John Curtis (adult)	
1982	Love Is Forever	John Everingham	Also co-producer
1984	Sam's Son	Gene Orman	

=== Television ===
Television
Year	Title	Role	Notes
1956	The Adventures of Jim Bowie	Jerome Juventin	Season 1, Episode 4: "Deputy Sheriff"
1956	The Adventures of Jim Bowie	Armand De Nivernais	Season 1, Episode 15: "The Swordsman"
1956	Crusader	Dick Manning	Season 2, Episode 11: "The Boy on the Brink"
1956	Wire Service	Pietro	Season 1, Episode 12: "High Adventure"
1956	Crossroads	Johnny Rico	Season 2, Episode 3: "Ringside Padre"
1956	Telephone Time	Caspar Hauser	S1:E5, "Mystery of Caspar Hauser"
1956	Cheyenne	U.S. Cavalry Trooper (Uncredited)	Season 1, Episode 7: "Decision"
1957	The 20th Century Fox Hour	Eddie	Season 2, Episode 8: "End of a Gun"
1957	Cavalcade of America	Frank	Season 5, Episode 18: "The Man from St. Paul"
1957	Crossroads	Race Stevens	Season 2, Episode 22: "Call for Help"
1957	Telephone Time	Lombard	Season 2, Episode 24, "Fight for the Title"
1957	General Electric Theater	Claude Duncan	Season 5, Episode 27: "Too Good with a Gun"
1957	General Electric Theater	Dixon	Season 5, Episode 30: "The Bitter Choice"
1957	State Trooper	Joe Durando	Season 1, Episode 18: "Buck Fever"
1957	State Trooper	Willie Losada	Season 1, Episode 24: "The Last War Party"
1957	The Court of Last Resort	Thomas Forbes	Season 1, Episode 3: "The Forbes-Carol Case"
1957	Suspicion	Howard	S1:E5, "The Story of Marjorie Reardon"
1957	Tales of Wells Fargo	Tad Cameron	Season 1, Episode 6: "Shotgun Messenger"
1957	Tales of Wells Fargo	Jackson	Season 1, Episode 10: "Sam Bass"
1957	Tales of Wells Fargo	Tad Cameron	Season 2, Episode 11: "The Kid"
1957	The Restless Gun	Sandy	Pilot episode
1957	Dr. Christian	Young Man	Season 1, Episode 20: "Mother's Boy"
1957	Zane Grey Theatre	Dan Overton	Season 2, Episode 11: "Gift from a Gunman"
1958	Cheyenne	Alan Horn / 'White Hawk'	Season 3, Episode 13: "White Warrior"
1958	Goodyear Theatre	Karl Wallace	Season 1, Episode 15: "The Giant Step"
1958	Schlitz Playhouse	Don Burns	Season 7, Episode 35: "Way of the West"
1958	Alcoa Theatre	Johnny Risk	Season 1, Episode 19: "Johnny Risk"
1958	Studio One	Augie Barone	Season 10, Episode 39, "Man Under Glass"
1958	The Texan	Nick Ahearn	Season 1, Episode 8: "The Hemp Tree"
1958	Trackdown	Jed Daws	Season 1, Episode 25: "The Pueblo Kid"
1958	Trackdown	Jack Summers	Season 2, Episode 13: "Day of Vengeance"
1958	U.S. Marshal	Don Sayers	Season 1, Episode 12: "The Champ"
1958	Wanted: Dead or Alive	Carl Martin	Season 1, Episode 1: "The Martin Poster"
1958	Tombstone Territory	Barton Clark Jr.	Season 1, Episode 39: "Rose of the Rio Bravo"
1958	Playhouse 90	Victor Gordon	Season 3, Episode 10: "Free Weekend"
1958	The Rifleman	Will Fulton	Season 1, Episode 3: "End of a Young Gun"
1959	The Rifleman	Billy Mathis	Season 1, Episode 40: "The Mind Reader"
1959	Zane Grey Theatre	Vance Coburn	S3:E13, "Living Is a Lonesome Thing"
1959	Frontier Doctor	Jim Mason	Season 1, Episode 15: "Shadows of Belle Starr"
1959	Westinghouse Desilu Playhouse	Aitchinson	Season 1, Episode 13: "Symbol of Authority"
1959	Wanted: Dead or Alive	Clay McGarrett	Season 1, Episode 27: "The Legend"
1959	Tombstone Territory	Chris Anderson	Season 2, Episode 7: "The Man from Brewster"
1959	Playhouse 90	Douglas Cunningham	Season 3, Episode 17: "A Quiet Game of Cards"
1959	Playhouse 90	Booth Latham	Season 3, Episode 30: "Dark December"
1959	Playhouse 90	Arthur Doner	Season 3, Episode 36: "Project Immortality"
1959	Johnny Staccato	Freddie Tate	Season 1, Episode 1: "The Naked Truth"
1959–1973	Bonanza	Joseph 'Little Joe' Cartwright	430 episodes
1974–1983	Little House on the Prairie	Charles Ingalls / Narrator	187 episodes
1984–1989	Highway to Heaven	Jonathan Smith	111 episodes
1990	Where Pigeons Go to Die	Hugh at 50	Television film; also director
1991	Us	Jeff Hayes	Television film; also director and writer

== Awards and honors ==
Year	Award / Organization	Category / Honor	Work	Result	Ref.
1969	Bambi Award	TV series International	Bonanza (shared with Lorne Greene, Dan Blocker, Pernell Roberts)	Won	
1970	Bronze Wrangler Award	Fictional Television Drama	Bonanza episode: "The Wish" (shared with director, producer and cast)	Won	
1979	Golden Globe Award	Best TV Actor – Drama	Little House on the Prairie	Nominated	
1980	Spur Award	Best TV Script	Little House on the Prairie episode: "May We Make Them Proud"	Won	
1984	Hollywood Walk of Fame	Television Star at 1500 N. Vine Street		Inducted	
1984	Golden Boot Award	Significant Contribution to the Western Genre		Honored	
1991	Youth in Film Award	Michael Landon Award	Outstanding Contribution to Youth Through Entertainment	Honored	
1995	Television Hall of Fame	Significant Contribution to the Field of Television		Honored	
1998	National Cowboy & Western Heritage Museum	Western Performers Hall of Fame		Inducted	
2004	TV Land Award	Most Memorable Mane	Little House on the Prairie	Nominated	
2005	TV Guide	50 Sexiest Stars of All Time		Ranked #33	
