= Timothy Patrick Murphy =

American actor (1959–1988)

- Born: November 3, 1959; Hartford, Connecticut, U.S.
- Died: December 6, 1988 (aged 29); Sherman Oaks, California, U.S.
- Occupation: Actor
- Years active: 1978–1988

Timothy Patrick Murphy (November 3, 1959 – December 6, 1988) was an American actor, widely known for his role as Mickey Trotter on the CBS prime time soap opera Dallas from 1982 to 1983.

== Career ==
Murphy started his acting career as an adolescent in several television commercials, and from there he went on to act in the 1978 miniseries Centennial. From 1980 to 1981, he played young conman Spencer Langley on the CBS daytime drama Search for Tomorrow. Murphy portrayed troubled Mickey Trotter on the CBS prime time soap opera Dallas from 1982 to 1983. During the 1984–1985 television season, he played series regular Chip Craddock on the ABC prime time drama Glitter. In addition to this, he appeared in episodes of the television shows Quincy, M.E., CHiPs, Teachers Only, Hotel, The Love Boat and Hunter.

Murphy appeared in the 1981 film The Bushido Blade. One of Murphy's most substantial roles was in the 1984 feature film Sam's Son, the film biography of the early life of actor Michael Landon, in which he played the character of Gene Orowitz (the young Landon).

In 1984, he won the Young Artist Award for Best Young Actor (Guest) in a TV Series for his work on The Love Boat.

== Personal life and death ==
Murphy was gay, as reported by his life partner Mark Patton.

Murphy died of AIDS on December 6, 1988, in Sherman Oaks, California, aged 29.

His younger brother, Patrick Sean Murphy (born January 29, 1965), died in the North Tower of the World Trade Center during the September 11, 2001 attacks. He was 36 years old.

== Filmography ==
Year	Title	Role	Notes
1978	The Paper Chase	Michael Burch	Episode: "Nancy"
1978	Centennial	Christian Zendt	TV miniseries; Episode: "The Longhorns"
1979	The Seekers	Jarod Kent	TV miniseries
1979	The Love Boat	Terry Gibson	Episode: "Too Young to Love"
1980–81	Search for Tomorrow	Spencer Langley	Unknown episodes
1980	A Time for Miracles	Will	TV movie
1981	The Bushido Blade	Midshipman Robin Burr	Feature film
1982	CHiPs	Alex	Episode: "In the Best of Families"
1982	Teachers Only	Jeremy	Episode: "Quote, Unquote"
1982	Quincy, M.E.	Nick Stadler	Episode: "The Mourning After"
1982–83	Dallas	Mickey Trotter	Main cast (27 episodes)
1983	The Love Boat	Kent Holden	Episode: "So Help Me Hannah"
1983	The Love Boat	David	Episode: "Bricker's Boy"
1984	Sam's Son	Gene Orowitz	Feature film
1984	With Intent to Kill	Drew Lanscott	TV movie
1984	Hotel	Andy / Kevin Walker	Episodes: "Tomorrows" / "Final Chapters"
1984–85	Glitter	Chip Craddock	Main cast (14 episodes)
1985	The Love Boat	Curtis Williams	Episodes: "A Gentleman of Discretion" (Parts 1 & 2)
1986	Hunter	Jeffery Wyatt	Episode: "True Confessions"
1988	Doin' Time on Planet Earth	Jeff Richmond	Feature film, (final film role)
