= Love Is Forever (1982 film) =

- Original film poster
- Directed by: Hall Bartlett
- Screenplay by: Hall Bartlett
- Story by: John Everingham
- Produced by: Hall Bartlett; Michael Landon
- Starring: Michael Landon; Laura Gemser; Jürgen Prochnow; Edward Woodward; Priscilla Presley
- Cinematography: Andrew Laszlo
- Music by: Klaus Doldinger; Lee Holdridge; Laura Branigan (singer); Carol Connors (song)
- Production company: 20th Century Fox
- Release dates: 1982; 1983 (U.S. television)
- Running time: 96 minutes
- Country: United States
- Language: English

Love Is Forever (also known as Comeback) is a 1982 adventure drama film based on the experiences of Australian journalist John Everingham in Laos and Thailand. It was written, directed and co-produced by Hall Bartlett and co-produced by Michael Landon, who played the lead role in the film. Filmed in Thailand, it was released outside the United States in cinemas under the titles Comeback and Passion and Valor and shown first in America on television.

This film was the last one Bartlett directed before his death in 1993.

== Plot ==
Following the Pathet Lao takeover of Laos, Australian journalist John Everingham is originally sympathetic but then feels the nation is turning into a police state. General Siegfried Kaplan, an East German advisor to the Pathet Lao secret police, has noticed that Western news agencies are receiving revealing news stories that could only have been provided by insiders in the government. Kaplan vows to plug the security leaks and identify and eliminate the sources of the stories.

According to the film, Everingham is the last Western journalist remaining in Laos. To gather information the General assigns the attractive Keo Sirisomphone to befriend and spy on Everingham. The two fall in love. Everingham is arrested, but rather than being executed or imprisoned he is exiled to Thailand.

Evernigham vows to return to Laos to rescue Keo by learning how to scuba dive in the Mekong River and bring her to Thailand. In the end, he succeeds.

== Cast ==
- Michael Landon as John Everingham
- Laura Gemser as Keo Sirisomphone (as Moira Chen)
- Jürgen Prochnow as General Siegfried Kaplan
- Edward Woodward as Derek McBracken
- Priscilla Presley as Sandy Redford
- David Leonard as Steve Hammond
- Cathy Bartlett as Cathy Hammond
- Gabriele Tinti as Georges

== Production ==
=== Development ===
John Everingham's account of his exploits was originally published in Newsweek. Producer Hall Bartlett purchased the rights. "I'd wanted to make a love story for a long time," said Bartlett, "but I wanted one that was true. When I read this one in Newsweek I knew that I'd found it." He spent months researching the story.

=== Casting ===
Upon the recommendation of his daughters, who enjoyed Little House on the Prairie, Bartlett cast Michael Landon as Everingham.

Landon said "there are a lot of anti heroes around but this is a true life hero who did something extraordinary for the woman he loved."

Landon later claimed his casting enabled Bartlett to raise $5 million from NBC. The movie was intended to be shown on NBC in the US but released theatrically by 20th Century Fox elsewhere in the world.

It was Landon's first lead in a feature since I Was a Teenage Werewolf.

For the role of Everingham's Laotian girlfriend and later wife, Bartlett cast Eurasian actress Laura Gemser. As she had previously been known to appear in erotic films, Bartlett insisted she be credited under the name of Moira Chen.

Hall Bartlett cast Priscilla Presley after being struck by her unusual wariness at their first meeting. Says Bartlett of his discovery, "She and Moira have the same kind of extreme vulnerability I was looking for. That's their defense mechanism. Both would crumble at the slightest criticism, and they don't speak unless they feel safe. They need protection and love."

Bartlett cast Jürgen Prochnow in his American film debut after the international success of Das Boot. He played an East German general wearing a variety of uniforms and carrying a riding crop. The screenplay had him and Landon square off in a kickboxing bout.

=== Shooting ===
The film was shot in Thailand with underwater sequences filmed in the Bahamas. Filming started in July 1982.

Everingham acted as an advisor on the film. Landon said "we glossed over the fact that Everingham is Australian since it really isn't important for the basic love story."

Landon and Bartlett clashed often during the production over a variety of issues with Bartlett eventually editing the film in secret to avoid Landon's interference.

"He just can't stand not being in charge," said Bartlett.

Later, in reference to Landon's work on Highway to Heaven and previously on Little House on the Prairie, Bartlett said, "If Landon is trying to get by with another Jesus Christ painting of himself, then let me say that Landon is the biggest liar I’ve ever met in the picture business."

Landon later replied, "Hassles are part of movie making. All I know is I got NBC to invest $5 million in the production. Without it, Bartlett never would have gotten the project together. And I never expected things to end up like this... For the record [I] never had a harsh word with any of the actors. Or the crew."

== Release ==
Two versions of the film were released - a theatrical version cut by Bartlett called Comeback. This was released in Canada and Bartlett said it made $1 million. The other version was a compromise cut between Bartlett and NBC which screened on NBC as Love is Forever.

Landon canceled an appearance on an NBC "Tonight Show" because he couldn't go on "in a good humor" after its producer said a film clip from the film was too depressing. "I sent them a clip in which I talk to the girl about what the Pathet Lao is doing to her country," he said. "It contained actual photographs. But [producer] Fred de Cordova said it was too depressing . . . I wanted to plug my movie, but at that point it was not worth it."

== Reception ==
The Globe and Mail film critic wrote "The fault here is doubly Bartlett's, for his lumpish direction and hopeless screenplay. For a script that is based on a true story, it's an amazing hodge-podge of misused fictional film cliches: Apocalypse Now dictates the style for the bombing of a boatload of refugees; Rocky determines the style of the boxing match between Everingham and Kapler; Chariots Of Fire donated Everingham's crusty British physical fitness trainer (played by Edward Woodward) and even the shark from Jaws has a brief cameo. Why not call it Close Encounters of The Third World Kind and have done with it?"

The Chicago Tribune wrote "as adventures go it's a real good one."
