= Christopher Landon (filmmaker) =

American filmmaker (born 1975)

- Born: Christopher Beau Landon; February 27, 1975 (age 51); Los Angeles, California, U.S.
- Education: Loyola Marymount University
- Occupation: Filmmaker
- Partner: Cody Morris
- Children: 2
- Parent: Michael Landon (father)
- Relatives: Leslie Landon (sister); Michael Landon Jr. (brother); Jennifer Landon (paternal half-sister); Mark Landon (adoptive brother); Rachel Matthews (niece)
- Writing career
- Years active: 1996–present

Christopher Beau Landon (born February 27, 1975) is an American filmmaker best known for working in the horror and comedy horror genres.

He has worked as a screenwriter on the thriller Disturbia and most of the films in the Paranormal Activity found-footage horror series. He wrote and directed Paranormal Activity: The Marked Ones as well as the horror comedy films Happy Death Day, Scouts Guide to the Zombie Apocalypse, Happy Death Day 2U, Freaky, and We Have a Ghost. He wrote and made his directorial debut on the satirical thriller film Burning Palms (2010).

== Early life ==
Landon was born in Los Angeles and is the son of actor Michael Landon and Lynn Noe. His paternal grandfather was Jewish, whereas his paternal grandmother was Catholic, although his father was raised Jewish. He is the youngest of their four children. His parents divorced in 1980, when he was four years old; he resided with his father until the age of sixteen, when his father died of pancreatic cancer. Two of his brothers, Mark and Michael Landon Jr., have been actors, as have his sister, Leslie Landon, and one of his half-sisters, Jennifer Landon.

== Career ==
Landon, following his father Michael Landon's footsteps in filmmaking, studied screenwriting at Loyola Marymount University, but dropped out three years into the course to pursue a career when film director Larry Clark offered him a writing job after reading one of his scripts. He went on to co-write the script of Another Day in Paradise (1998) with Eddie Little and Stephen Chin. After writing Another Day in Paradise, he came out as gay, aware that homophobia may have harmed his potential in the industry. "I may fall off some list because of my sexuality. But if that happens, then I really don't want to be on that list anyway," he said, speaking of homophobia in Hollywood and the film industry. "I was the flavor of the month, and then I was quickly dismissed. I reached a point in my career when I couldn't get a meeting anywhere." He moved from Los Angeles to Austin, Texas, contemplating the future of his career, which he revived only a few years later.

Many of Landon's films deal with gay themes and issues, including $30, one of five components in Boys Life 3 (2000), a collection of short films dealing with issues faced by young gays, and a spec script about the relationship between a straight man and a gay man. More recently, he has written the screenplays of the 2007 films Blood and Chocolate, The Flock and the acclaimed Disturbia. Disturbia was one of his spec scripts which was brought to Montecito Pictures and subsequently DreamWorks Pictures, and went on to become No. 1 in cinemas upon its release. He next worked on The Lesson, a film for DreamWorks and the 2007 television series Dirty Sexy Money, his first television project, eager to expand his repertoire. He is worked on a screenplay for a film adaption of Lisa McMann's young adult novel Wake. Landon made his directorial debut with Burning Palms (2010), an ensemble comedic thriller that was poorly received.

Landon became a creative voice behind the Paranormal Activity film series, writing Paranormal Activity 2 (2010), Paranormal Activity 3 (2011), Paranormal Activity 4 (2012), and Paranormal Activity: Next of Kin (2021). Landon also directed and wrote the franchise spinoff Paranormal Activity: The Marked Ones, which was released in 2014.

Landon's next film was Scouts Guide to the Zombie Apocalypse (2015). He then co-wrote Viral (2016), and wrote and directed Happy Death Day (2017), Happy Death Day 2U (2019), and Freaky (2020).

In August 2023, Landon was announced to direct Scream 7, the seventh installment in the Scream franchise. However, Landon announced on December 23, 2023 that he was no longer associated with the sequel, saying: "I guess now is as good a time as any to announce I formally exited Scream 7 weeks ago. It was a dream job that turned into a nightmare. And my heart did break for everyone involved. Everyone. But it's time to move on." He later explained that without Melissa Barrera, who was fired in November due to her pro-Palestinian social media posts about the Gaza war, the film he had signed on to direct no longer existed, and therefore there was no reason for him to continue. Though Landon had no involvement with the studio's actions, he faced backlash and harassment from some Barrera fans online, to the point of having threats leveled against him and his family: "People were threatening to kill me and my family, to the point where the FBI was getting involved. I got messages saying, 'I'm going to find your kids, and I'm going to kill them because you support child murder.' The head of security at various studios and the FBI had to examine the threats."

== Personal life ==
Landon came out as gay in 1999, having only written the script of Another Day in Paradise, unafraid of his sexuality harming his career potential. He says that growing up he was called a "faggot" by peers at his high school. His mother, a Christian, refused to accept his sexuality. His stepmother, Cindy Clerico, his father's next wife, told him that both she and his father suspected he was gay.

Landon has a partner, Cody Morris. The couple have two children together.

== Filmography ==
Year	Title	Director	Writer	Producer	Notes
1998	Another Day in Paradise	No	Yes	No	
2000	Boys Life 3	No	Yes	Yes	Segment: "$30"
2007	Blood & Chocolate	No	Yes	No	
2007	Disturbia	No	Yes	No	
2007–2009	Dirty Sexy Money	No	Yes	Consultant	Television series Writer: 2 episodes
2010	Burning Palms	Yes	Yes	Yes	Directorial debut
2010	Paranormal Activity 2	No	Yes	No	
2011	Paranormal Activity 3	No	Yes	Co-producer	
2012	Paranormal Activity 4	No	Yes	Executive	
2014	Paranormal Activity: The Marked Ones	Yes	Yes	No	
2015	Scouts Guide to the Zombie Apocalypse	Yes	Yes	No	
2016	Viral	No	Yes	No	
2017	Happy Death Day	Yes	Uncredited	No	
2019	Happy Death Day 2U	Yes	Yes	No	
2020	Freaky	Yes	Yes	No	
2021	Paranormal Activity: Next of Kin	No	Yes	Executive	
2021	Unknown Dimension: The Story of Paranormal Activity	No	No	No	Documentary film, interview
2022	My Best Friend's Exorcism	No	No	Yes	
2023	We Have a Ghost	Yes	Yes	Executive	
2024	Time Cut	No	No	Yes	
2025	Heart Eyes	No	Yes	Yes	
2025	Drop	Yes	No	No	
