= Magpie (character) =

Fictional character of the DC Universe

- Magpie, from the cover of Batgirl (vol. 5) #8 (February 2017); Art by Christian Wildgoose

Publication information
- Publisher: DC Comics
- First appearance: The Man of Steel #3 (November 1986)
- Created by: John Byrne

In-story information
- Alter ego: Margaret Pye
- Species: Human
- Team affiliations: Black Lantern Corps; Suicide Squad
- Abilities: Hand-to-hand combat Fingernail extending

Magpie (Margaret "Mag" Pye) is a supervillain appearing in American comic books published by DC Comics. She was created by John Byrne, and first appeared in The Man of Steel #3 (November 1986). The character is an enemy of Batman and one of many villains who make up his rogues gallery.

The character has been portrayed in live-action by Sarah Schenkkan in the final season of Gotham, Rachel Matthews in the first season of the Arrowverse series Batwoman, and Marié Botha in The Penguin. Grey DeLisle voiced the character in Beware the Batman.

== Fictional character biography ==
=== 1986–2011 ===
Magpie, as she originally appeared in The Man of Steel #3 (November 1986). Art by John Byrne.

Magpie is a jewel thief who specifically targets jewels named after birds and then replaces them with booby-trapped replicas. Taking a job as a museum curator, Pye is slowly driven mad surrounded by the beautiful things that she loves but can never own. She was notable in Post-Crisis continuity as the first villain who was defeated by Superman and Batman working together, Superman having visited Gotham to "apprehend" Batman before Batman's demonstration of his skills while tracking Magpie convinced Superman that Gotham needed someone like Batman to protect it.

Some time after during the events of Legends, Pye is released on an insanity plea and goes on another rampage, before eventually being stopped by Batman and Jason Todd.

Magpie is murdered by Tally Man, along with Orca, Ventriloquist, and KGBeast, villains working for the Penguin. Ultimately, her death was part of a revenge scheme by Great White Shark.

During the "Blackest Night" storyline, Magpie is revived as a Black Lantern.

=== The New 52 ===
In 2011, DC Comics rebooted the DC Universe through "The New 52". During the "Forever Evil" storyline, Magpie appears as a member of the Secret Society of Super Villains, which Outsider set up on behalf of the Crime Syndicate of America.

In 2016, DC Comics implemented a relaunch of its books called "DC Rebirth", which restored its continuity to a form much as it was prior to "The New 52". Magpie appears as a member of the Suicide Squad.

== Powers and abilities ==
Magpie is an expert at hand-to-hand combat. Later appearances showed her with the ability to extend her fingernails into claws.

=== Equipment ===
Magpie is an expert at creating gadgetry that resembles the items that she stole. She also makes use of weapons that are explosive, can emit airborne toxins, or shoot razor blades.

== In other media ==
=== Television ===
- Magpie appears in Beware the Batman, voiced by Grey DeLisle. This version is a split personality of Margaret Sorrow, who was the subject of a failed experiment meant to remove her kleptomania in exchange for a reduced sentence at Blackgate Penitentiary that granted her retractable claws (which she laces with non-lethal doses of Curare) and the inability to feel pain. Later in the series, Magpie develops an obsessive attraction towards Batman and jealousy towards his partner Katana.
- Magpie appears in the Gotham episode "13 Stitches", portrayed by Sarah Schenkkan. This version's design takes inspiration from the Beware the Batman incarnation.
- Magpie appears in Batwoman, portrayed by Rachel Matthews. This version utilizes 3D-printed bombs in her robberies, poses as photographer Margot to canvas potential heist locations, and has a sister named Reagan.
- Magpie appears in promotional artwork released for Harley Quinn.
- Magpie, based on her pre-New 52 design, makes a non-speaking appearance in the Kite Man: Hell Yeah! episode "Portal Potty, Hell Yeah!".
- Magpie appears in The Penguin episode "Cent'Anni", portrayed by Marié Botha.

=== Film ===
Magpie makes a minor non-speaking appearance in The Lego Batman Movie.

=== Video games ===
Magpie appears as a character summon in Scribblenauts Unmasked: A DC Comics Adventure.

=== Miscellaneous ===
- Magpie appears in the DC Super Hero Girls tie-in comic books.
- Magpie appears in Injustice 2 as a member of the Suicide Squad until she is killed by Jason Todd.
- Magpie appears in the Spotify audio series Harley Quinn and The Joker: Sound Mind, voiced by Mary Holland.
- Magpie appears in the DC Comics Novel series adaptation of Mad Love, written by Paul Dini and Pat Cadigan. This version is a patient of Arkham Asylum under Harleen Quinzel's care.
