= The Bushido Blade =

- Theatrical release poster
- Directed by: Tom Kotani
- Screenplay by: William Overgard
- Produced by: Arthur Rankin Jr.
- Starring: Richard Boone; Sonny Chiba; Frank Converse; Laura Gemser; James Earl Jones; Mako; Timothy Murphy; Michael Starr; Tetsurō Tamba; Toshiro Mifune
- Cinematography: Shōji Ueda
- Edited by: Yoshitami Kuroiwa
- Music by: Maury Laws
- Production companies: Trident Films; Rankin/Bass Productions
- Distributed by: Aquarius Releasing
- Release date: 1981
- Running time: 104 minutes
- Countries: United Kingdom; United States; Japan
- Languages: English; Japanese
- Budget: $5 million

The Bushido Blade is a 1981 film directed by Tom Kotani. The film stars Sonny Chiba, Toshiro Mifune, Mako, Laura Gemser, James Earl Jones and Richard Boone in his last film appearance. It was filmed in 1978, but not released until 1981.

== Plot ==
The Bushido Blade is a fictional sideline to the true events surrounding the treaty Commodore Matthew Perry signed with the shogun of feudal Japan. The samurai sword entrusted to Commodore Perry for President Franklin Pierce of the United States by the Emperor of Japan is stolen by factions wishing to maintain Japanese isolationism. The sword is stolen by Baron Zen, who is a servant of Lord Yamato, who opposes the Convention of Kanagawa about to be signed.

Commodore Akira Hayashi is told to recover the sword and, as a matter of honor, not sign the treaty until it is recovered. Prince Ido has received Hayashi's order to regain the sword and goes to the castle of Yamato alone. Similarly, Perry has ordered Captain Lawrence Hawk to retrieve the sword. Hawk brings Midshipman Robin Gurr and Crew Bos'n Cave Johnson. The three get separated and the movie centers on their stories.

== Cast ==
Principal actors

- Richard Boone as Commodore Matthew C. Perry
- Sonny Chiba as Prince Ido (as Sony Chiba)
- Frank Converse as Captain Lawrence Hawk
- Laura Gemser as Tomoe
- James Earl Jones as the prisoner (a crew member of the whaling ship)
- Mako Iwamatsu as Enjirō (as Mako)
- Timothy Murphy as Midshipman Robin Gurr
- Michael Starr as L/S Cave Johnson
- Tetsurō Tamba as Lord Yamato
- Toshirō Mifune as Commodore Akira Hayashi

Supporting roles

- Bin Amatsu as Baron Zen
- Mayumi Asano as Yuki
- Kin Ōmae as Rikishi (sumo wrestler) (as Kin Omai)

== Crew ==
- Film director - Tom Kotani
- Executive producer - Jules Bass
- Associate producer - Benni Korzen, Masaki Îzuka
- Producer - Arthur Rankin, Jr.
- Writer - William Overgard
- Music - Maury Laws
- Cinematography - Shōji Ueda
- Editing - Yoshitami Kuroiwa
- Post-production executive - Robert D. Cardona
- Editorial consultant - Anne V. Coates
- Production manager - Kishirô Ōkubo
- 1st assistant direction - Kouichi Nakajima
- Lighting - Kazuo Shimomura
- Art director - Toyokazu Ôhashi
- Sound recording - Yūji Miyoshi
- Sound editor - Ian Crafford
- Sound re-recording - Paul Carr (composer)
- Dueling master - Ryu Kuze
- Production secretary - Barbara Hilse
- U.S.Navy coordination - Commodore William North, U.S.N.

== See also ==
- List of historical drama films of Asia
