= Sam's Son =

- Cover of the VHS release
- Directed by: Michael Landon
- Screenplay by: Michael Landon
- Produced by: Kent McCray
- Starring: Eli Wallach; Anne Jackson; Timothy Patrick Murphy; Hallie Todd; Jonna Lee; Michael Landon
- Cinematography: Ted Voigtländer
- Edited by: John Loeffler
- Music by: David Rose
- Production company: Michael Landon Productions
- Distributed by: Invictus Entertainment
- Release date: August 17, 1984
- Running time: 104 minutes
- Country: United States
- Language: English

Sam's Son is a 1984 American semi-autobiographical coming-of-age drama film written and directed by Michael Landon loosely based on his early life and is also the only feature film made by him. The film stars Eli Wallach, Anne Jackson, Timothy Patrick Murphy, Hallie Todd, Jonna Lee, James Karen, and Landon in a cameo. The film was produced independently by Landon and released by Utah-based distributor Invictus Entertainment.

== Plot ==
The film begins when a private jet descends on a runway of a small airport in Collingswood, New Jersey. Famous movie director Gene Orman (Landon) has visited the town to attend the premiere of his latest film Sam's Son. On the way to the theater, he orders his driver to have the limo stop across the street from his childhood home where he grew up. He gets out and looks at the house, while tearfully saying "We did it, Sam."

The story then takes us back to the year 1953 when Gene is in high school and is an ordinary, shy teenager struggling with his identity (Murphy). His parents, Sam (Wallach), a movie theater manager, and Harriet (Jackson), a housewife, were an unhappy couple, who constantly bickered. Eugene is constantly bullied by his sharp-tongued mother Harriet, who had no patience for his privacy in the bathroom, disliked his long hair and his love for movies. Gene also has a girlfriend Bonnie (Lee), a cheerleader, who grows increasingly disdained with him, especially when the new transfer student and resident bully Robert Woods (Hayes) begins to take a liking to Bonnie, and eventually becomes the star of the football team. One night, when Eugene and Bonnie are at the movies, they are harassed by Woods in the theater until Sam firmly escorts him out. To get revenge, he challenges Eugene to a fight when he takes Bonnie home, but Eugene backs down and Woods calls him a wimp for chickening out. While running home, Eugene meets with classmates who drag a reluctant Eugene to a rowdy neighborhood bar where they eventually get into a fight with a loutish patron, but they escape before the cops are called.

At the same time, the high school track coach Sutter (William Boyett) is impressed with Eugene's work on throwing the javelin and he offers to help him compete in future track meets, providing his grades don't suffer because of it. That night, at the theater, Eugene watches Samson and Delilah and he wonders if he grew his hair, would he be strong enough to win the track meets. The next day, fellow schoolmate Cathy Stanton (Todd), who had been witnessing Eugene's work for several weeks, offers to help him with tutoring to make sure his grades don't fail if he wins a scholarship to the University of Southern California. However, soon after, the unsympathetic principal Mr. Collins (Karen) discovers Eugene hasn't cut his hair for quite some time and he orders him to or he will be barred from future track meets, even after Eugene tries to convince Collins he has to let his hair grow so he doesn't lose his strength.

Although Harriet disapproves of Eugene's actions, Sam secretly takes him to his brother, a famous doctor, to wrap his head in bandages so no one will get suspicious and Sam demands Eugene to keep it a secret from everybody. As weeks go by, Eugene wins meet after meet and one night, he and Cathy go on a date to the local drive-in, until it gets ruined by Woods, who slams his car into Eugene's. Again, he challenges him to a fight, but because Eugene has the upper hand in strength, he knocks Woods out cold. The next day, a determined Bonnie decides to reconcile her relationship with Eugene, but to no avail as he's already seeing Cathy.

As a subplot, Sam understands about Eugene getting bullied all the time as he has a jerk of a boss, Mr. Bellow (Harvey Gold), who constantly berates Sam. One day, he finally stands up to him saying he will quit his job unless he's allowed to go to Eugene's track meet. Bellow reluctantly agrees to let him have a couple of hours off, and Sam is delighted. However, on the day of the event, Sam is forced to help deliver a slate of film prints after the delivery truck breaks down. The heavy lifting and carrying sadly takes a toll on Sam, who collapses on the stairs from a heart attack. At the track meet, Eugene and Cathy patiently wait for Sam when a policeman comes over and tells them the bad news. Angry and distraught, he unwraps the bandages from his head, revealing a full head of long hair. He takes his javelin and throws it over 200 feet in the air, landing next to a distance cone.

Eugene and Cathy immediately rush to the hospital to an emotional Harriet. She tells Eugene to tell Sam they will be all right on their own without him. When he goes into his room, the doctor informs him Sam will need a new heart but are unable to give it to him due to money and technology. At Sam's bedside, he apologizes to Eugene for not showing up and tells him to look at a script at their house he has been working on for weeks. The life support system flatlines, and Eugene rushes to get help. However, it's too late.

We then travel back to the present day, where Gene's friend Cy Martin (Howard Bassett) is seen explaining to someone on the limo's phone asking why they're not at the theater yet. After hanging up, Cy informs Gene they have to get there before the movie starts. When they arrive, he is greeted by a swarm of excited fans, his wife Cathy, and even Mr. Bellow, who obviously changed his ways, attitude-wise. Bellow tells Gene that it is an honor to have him at his theater. To put him in his place, Gene orders Bellow to fix five letters out on the marquee. As Gene and Cathy enter the theater, Bellow informs him it will be done. Before the fade to black, Bellow looks up at the marquee and nods his head sarcastically at the title.

== Cast ==
- Eli Wallach as Sam Orowitz
- Anne Jackson as Harriet Orowitz
- Timothy Patrick Murphy as Gene Orowitz
- Hallie Todd as Cathy Stanton
- Alan Hayes as Robert Woods
- Jonna Lee as Bonnie Barnes
- Michael Landon as Gene Orman
- Howard Witt as Cy Martin
- James Karen as Mr. Collins

== Production ==
Michael Landon originally wrote the film's script in the summer of 1982 while his television series Little House on the Prairie was taking a break for the next season. He pitched the idea to NBC, which was interested to have it as a television movie, but Landon had wanted it to be a feature film.

Production began in the summer of 1983 in Southern California, substituting it for New Jersey. Timothy Patrick Murphy was cast as Eugene Orowitz because Landon thought he looked exactly like he did when he was younger and had seen him on Dallas as Charlene Tilton's boyfriend Mickey Trotter. Eli Wallach and Anne Jackson were cast as Eugene's parents because Landon knew their real-life marriage would blend in with their characters. Hallie Todd, another newcomer in show business, was cast after she appeared in the TV movie Who Will Love My Children? For the film, Landon used most of his TV crew from Little House on the Prairie.
