= Leslie Landon =

American actress

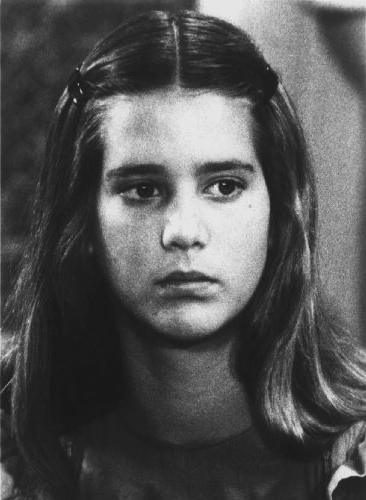
- Landon on Little House on the Prairie c. 1977
- Education: Pepperdine University (BA, MA); California Graduate Institute (PhD.)
- Occupations: Actress, psychologist
- Years active: 1975–1984
- Known for: Portraying Etta Plum in Little House on the Prairie
- Spouse: Brian Matthews (m. 1990)
- Children: 4, including Rachel Matthews
- Parent: Michael Landon
- Relatives: Michael Landon Jr. (brother); Mark Landon (adoptive brother); Christopher Landon (brother); Jennifer Landon (sister)

Leslie Landon Matthews (née Landon) is an American psychologist and former actress. She had a supporting role on the Little House on the Prairie television series, in which her father, Michael Landon, played the lead.

Served as Queen Shenandoah LIII in 1980 at the Shenandoah Apple Blossom Festival in Winchester, VA. Her reign launched a family tradition, with her sister Shawna (1996) and daughter Rachel (2013) later wearing the crown.

== Career ==
Matthews made small guest appearances in four episodes of Little House on the Prairie between 1975 and 1981. From 1982 to 1984, she portrayed schoolteacher Etta Plum on Little House.

She became a psychologist.

== Personal life ==
Landon's parents are actor-director Michael and Lynn Landon. Landon has eight siblings, including two brothers, Michael Landon Jr. and Christopher Landon, and a sister, Shawna Leigh Landon, from her parents' marriage. From her mother's first marriage, Landon has another half-sister, Cheryl Lynn Landon. From her father's marriage to Cindy Landon, she has a half-sister, Jennifer Landon, and a half-brother, Sean Matthew Landon. She has an adopted brother, Mark Landon (now deceased), and a half-brother, Josh Landon, both from her father's first marriage to Dodie Fraser. Her paternal grandfather was Jewish and her paternal grandmother was Catholic. Her father was raised Jewish.

Landon married Brian Matthews in 1990. Her eldest daughter, born in 1993, Rachel Matthews, is also an actress, with her film debut in Happy Death Day, directed by her uncle Christopher.

Landon obtained a BA in psychology and an MA in clinical psychology from Pepperdine University and a Ph.D. in marriage and family therapy from the California Graduate Institute.

== Filmography ==
- Little House on the Prairie
  - 1975: Leslie, a plague victim girl, in "The Plague" (season 1)
  - 1977: Kate in "The Election" (season 3)
  - 1979: Marge in "The Third Miracle" (season 6)
  - 1981: Pam in "A Wiser Heart" (season 8)
  - 1982–83: Etta Plum, 15 episodes (season 9)
  - 1983: Etta Plum in Little House: Look Back to Yesterday (TV movie)
  - 1984: Etta Plum in Little House: Bless All the Dear Children (TV movie)
  - 1984: Etta Plum in Little House: The Last Farewell (TV movie)
- Father Murphy
  - 1982: Kate Jones in "The Dream Day"

== Bibliography ==
- When Children Grieve: For Adults to Help Children Deal with Death, Divorce, Pet Loss, Moving, and Other Losses. By John W. James, Russell Friedman, Dr. Leslie Matthews. HarperCollins, 2001.
