= Kent McCray =

American television producer

- Born: June 7, 1928; Hartford, Connecticut, U.S.
- Died: June 3, 2018 (aged 89); Los Angeles, California, U.S.
- Education: Kimball Union Academy
- Alma mater: University of Hartford
- Occupation: Television producer
- Spouse: 2, including Susan Sukman
- Children: 4
- Parent(s): Mr. and Mrs. Tom McCray

Kent McCray (June 7, 1928 – June 3, 2018) was an American television producer. He produced many television programs, including Little House on the Prairie.

The son of Mr. and Mrs. Tom McCray, he studied at the Hartt School performing arts conservatory at the University of Hartford in Connecticut.

In addition to Little House on the Prairie, McCray worked on Bonanza, The Red Skelton Show, and This Is Your Life. He also was associate producer with Bob Hope and worked with many of Hope's USO tours overseas. McCray also produced Highway to Heaven from 1984 to 1989, becoming showrunner beginning with that series' second season.

In 2005, McCray donated $100,000 to the Hartt School's television studio. In return, the university named the facility the Kent McCray Television Studio.
