= Joel Berti =

American actor

- Born: December 17, 1971 (age 54)
- Occupation: Actor

Joel Berti (born December 17, 1971) is an American actor, acting coach and photographer. He is best known for his role as William Chandler on MyNetworkTV telenovela, Fashion House. He is the brother of Chiara Jude Berti, born in New York City, New York in 1977, who appeared on Season 3 of Big Brother,

== Filmography ==
- Beer Friday (2007) (V) .... Kyle
- Fashion House (15 episodes, 2006) .... William Chandler
- Fish Without a Bicycle (2003) .... Aaron
- Jack Woody (2003) .... Blain
- Friends (1 episode, 2002) .... Guy in Coffee Shop
- Inside the Osmonds (2001) (TV) .... Alan Osmond
- Touched by an Angel (1 episode, 2000) .... Zach
- Pensacola: Wings of Gold (1 episode, 2000) .... Capt. Joseph 'Ski' Zabronski
- Pacific Blue (2 episodes, 1997–2000) .... Donny Lynch
- Martial Law (1 episode, 1999) .... Patrick
- Rude Awakening (1 episode, 1999) .... Brian
- Michael Landon, the Father I Knew (1999) (TV) .... Michael Landon Jr.
- Silk Stalkings (1 episode, 1997) .... Mark Stavros
- USA High (1 episode, 1997) .... Paul Ember
- Social Studies (1997) TV series (unknown episodes) ....
- Saved by the Bell: Wedding in Las Vegas (1994) (TV) .... Red Team Guy #2
- Search and Rescue (1994) (TV) ....
