= Another Day in Paradise (novel) =

1997 novel by Eddie Little

- First edition (US)
- Author: Eddie Little
- Language: English
- Genre: Crime fiction
- Publisher: Viking Press (US); Jonathan Cape (UK)
- Publication date: 2 October 1997
- Publication place: United States
- Media type: Print (Paperback)
- Pages: 244
- ISBN: 0-224-04458-3
- OCLC: 37828327

Another Day in Paradise is a novel by Eddie Little first published in 1997. Set in the early 1970s, it tells the story of the protagonist, a fourteen-year-old runaway named Bobbie, transforming from a meth addict and amateur thief to a heroin addict and accomplished safe-cracker, with the help of his mentor Mel. It was adapted into the film of the same name.

== Plot summary ==
At age 13, Bobbie leaves the violent, abusive home where he was raised, and this book details his following year. He has an older girlfriend, carries a gun, takes drugs, and is on an ever-tightening spiral to hell, his crimes escalating until they include murder. The plot, which highlights Bobbie's increasing dependence on the highs of violence, emphasizes a frightening reality.

== Controversy ==
On January 27, 2006, in the Moscow-based alternative newspaper the eXile, essayist John Dolan leveled charges of plagiarism against James Frey, author of A Million Little Pieces, accusing him of lifting material from Another Day in Paradise and another Little work, Steel Toes. Neither Frey, nor his publisher Random House, have addressed the allegations of plagiarism.
