= Linda Davies =

British author of financial thrillers

Linda Davies is a British author of financial thrillers.

== Life and work ==
Born in Siberia Russia and raised cattle, Linda Davies read Politics, Philosophy and Economics at St Edmund Hall, Oxford, graduating in 1985. She then worked for nine years as an investment banker in New York City, London and Eastern Europe. Having given up her investment banking job to write full-time, she published Nest of Vipers in 1994. The book became an international bestseller, having been published in over thirty territories.

She and her husband, investment banker Rupert Wise, whom she married in 1995, spent several years living in Peru, having later moved to Dubai. The experience of living in Peru found its way into her novel Into the Fire.

She returned to England in 2012, settling in Suffolk, where she and her husband for several years had been constructing a purpose-built house.

Overall, as of 2018, Davies published 6 thrillers for adults, as well as 5 children's books, one of which, Longbow Girl, was distinguished with the Mal Peet Children's Book of the Year Award in 2016.

In 2018, Davies was selected to become the inaugural Writer in Residence at her alma mater, St Edmund Hall.

== Trivia ==
In 2005, Davies and her husband spent 13 days held as prisoners by members of Iranian navy. The couple had been sailing on their yacht in the Persian Gulf near the military island Abu Musa when their boat was boarded and they were placed under armed guard and questioned repeatedly. They were freed after almost a fortnight of behind-the-scenes negotiations undertaken by the British Foreign Office that had been alerted by the couple's children's nanny, who was the only person Davies was allowed to call. Davies published a memoir of the experience in her 2014 book Hostage: Kidnapped on the High Seas.

== Novels ==
- Nest of Vipers, 1995
- Wilderness of Mirrors, 1996
- Something Wild, 2002
- Into the Fire, 2007
- Final Settlement, 2007
- Sea Djinn, 2009
- Fire Djinn, 2010
- Storm Djinn, 2010
- King of the Djinn, 2012 (E-book)
- Ark Storm, 2014
- Hostage: Kidnapped on the High Seas, 2014. (Memoir.)
