= Us (1991 film) =

- Genre: Drama
- Written by: Michael Landon
- Directed by: Michael Landon
- Starring: Michael Landon; Barney Martin; Casey Peterson
- Music by: Steve Dorff
- Country of origin: United States
- Original language: English

Production
- Executive producer: Michael Landon
- Producer: Kent McCray
- Cinematography: Haskell B. Boggs
- Editor: John Loeffler
- Production companies: Michael Landon Productions; Columbia Pictures Television

Original release
- Network: CBS
- Release: September 20, 1991

Us is a 1991 television movie broadcast on CBS, produced, written and directed by Michael Landon. Landon also starred in the film, along with Barney Martin and Casey Peterson. It was a pilot for what would have been Landon's fourth consecutive television series and his first for a network other than NBC; Landon's death that year precluded its going ahead, but the pilot aired as a posthumous tribute to Landon in September 1991.

Landon played Jeff Hayes, a man just released from prison after serving many years due to being wrongfully convicted of killing a wealthy man's wife.
