= Eddie Little =

American author (1954–2003)

- Born: August 25, 1954; Los Angeles, California, U.S.
- Died: May 20, 2003 (aged 48); Los Angeles, California, U.S.
- Occupations: Novelist, journalist
- Children: 1

Eddie Little (August 25, 1954 – May 20, 2003) was a widely acclaimed American author. He wrote Another Day in Paradise, later made into a film of the same name directed by Larry Clark. Little was also the author of "Outlaw LA" an ongoing article published in LA Weekly. His writings were a rugged portrayal of coming of age in the underbelly of society and heroin addiction. His books were largely autobiographical, and although his supporting characters tended to be fictional, the narrators were almost parallel with himself.

Little died of a heart attack in a Los Angeles motel room, at the age of 48. He was survived by a daughter and two siblings.

== Bibliography ==
- Little, Eddie (1998). Another Day in Paradise. Viking Adult. ISBN 978-0670872176.
- Little, Eddie (2001). Steel Toes. L.A. Weekly Books. ISBN 978-0312282912.
