= Divide/Conquer =

American film and television production company

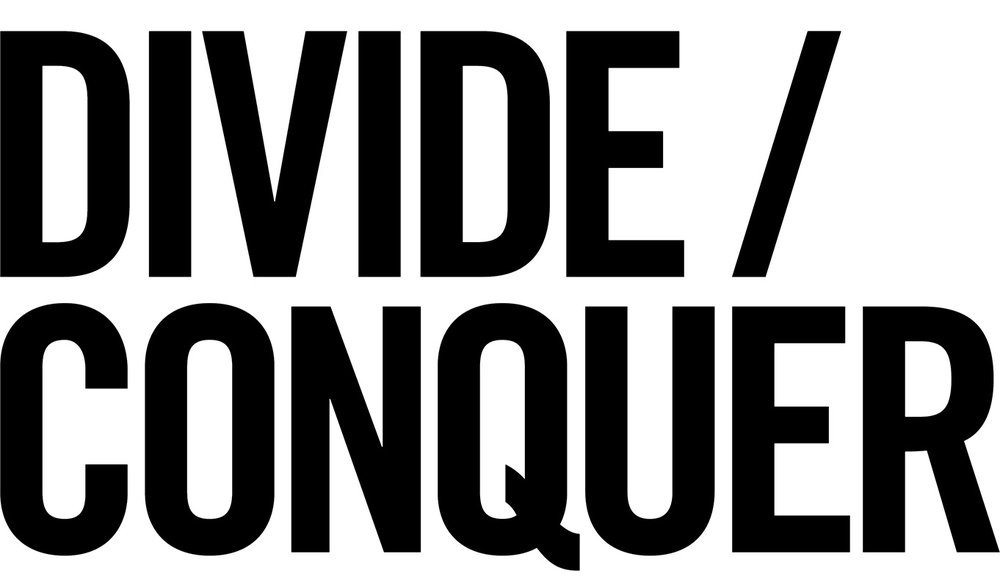
- Type: Privately held company
- Industry: Film; Television
- Founded: 2013; 13 years ago
- Founder: Adam Hendricks; Greg Gilreath; John H. Lang
- Headquarters: Los Angeles, California, United States
- Key people: Adam Hendricks; Greg Gilreath
- Website: divideconquer.us

Divide/Conquer (pronounced "Divide and Conquer") is an American film and television production company founded in 2013 by Adam Hendricks, Greg Gilreath and John H. Lang. It is known for producing films such as Lucky, Cam, Black Christmas, Freaky, The Voyeurs, Vengeance, M3GAN, Totally Killer and Heart Eyes.

== Overview ==
Divide/Conquer oversees the development and production of budget films. Its first films were Lucky, Like. Share. Follow. and Totem. It is also known for producing multiple projects with Jason Blum and Blumhouse Productions. Its films Freaky and M3GAN were both featured at Universal's Halloween Horror Nights in Hollywood and Orlando.

On December 9, 2025, the company signed a first-look deal with Blumhouse Atomic Monster.

== Feature films ==
Release date	Film	Director(s)	Distributor
September 29, 2017	Lucky	John Carroll Lynch	Magnolia Pictures
October 31, 2017	Like. Share. Follow.	Glenn Gers	Cinemax
October 31, 2017	Totem	Marcel Sarmiento	Cinemax
May 4, 2018	Family Blood	Sonny Mallhi	Netflix
November 16, 2018	Cam	Daniel Goldhaber	Netflix
December 7, 2018	Newly Single	Adam Christian Clark	Gravitas Ventures
March 31, 2019	Mercy Black	Owen Egerton	Netflix
April 5, 2019	The Wind	Emma Tammi	IFC Midnight
April 14, 2019	Thriller	Dallas Jackson	Netflix
September 20, 2019	Bloodline	Henry Jacobson	Momentum Pictures
November 1, 2019	Adopt a Highway	Logan Marshall-Green	RLJE Films
December 13, 2019	Black Christmas	Sophia Takal	Universal Pictures
November 13, 2020	Freaky	Christopher Landon	Universal Pictures
December 18, 2020	Climate of the Hunter	Mickey Reece	Dark Star Pictures
March 20, 2021	Wildcat	Jonathan W. Stokes	Saban Films
May 8, 2021	Pink Skies Ahead	Kelly Oxford	MTV Entertainment Studios
September 10, 2021	The Voyeurs	Michael Mohan	Amazon Studios
December 10, 2021	Agnes	Mickey Reece	Magnet Releasing
July 15, 2022	Diary of a Spy	Adam Christian Clark	XYZ Films
July 29, 2022	Vengeance	B. J. Novak	Focus Features
October 7, 2022	The Visitor	Justin P. Lange	Epix
November 1, 2022	Deborah	Noga Pnueli	1091 Pictures
January 6, 2023	M3GAN	Gerard Johnstone	Universal Pictures
April 7, 2023	Play Dead	Patrick Lussier	Voltage Pictures
June 9, 2023	Brooklyn 45	Ted Geoghegan	Shudder
September 1, 2023	Perpetrator	Jennifer Reeder	Shudder
October 6, 2023	Totally Killer	Nahnatchka Khan	Amazon MGM Studios
November 10, 2023	It's a Wonderful Knife	Tyler MacIntyre	RLJE Films; Shudder
October 3, 2024	House of Spoils	Bridget Savage Cole; Danielle Krudy	Amazon MGM Studios
February 7, 2025	Heart Eyes	Josh Ruben	Sony Pictures Releasing
June 27, 2025	M3GAN 2.0	Gerard Johnstone	Universal Pictures
October 17, 2025	Black Phone 2	Scott Derrickson	Universal Pictures
April 10, 2026	Faces of Death	Daniel Goldhaber	Independent Film Company

=== Upcoming films ===
Release date	Film	Director(s)	Distributor
April 2, 2027	Play House	Nicolas Curcio	Focus Features
May 7, 2027	Anything but Ghosts	Curry Barker	Focus Features
September 24, 2027	Blair Witch Project	Dylan Clark	Lionsgate
February 4, 2028	Heart Eyes 2	Josh Ruben	Paramount Pictures

=== Undated films ===
Film	Director(s)	Distributor
4 X 4: The Event	Alexander Ullom	Neon
Occupant	Joshua Giuliano	Focus Features
Thud	Mali Elfman	—N/a

== Short films ==
Year	Short	Director
2013	Jerry, the Exorcist Roommate	Kevin Oeser
2013	The Key	Sherwin Shilati
2013	This Is How You Die	Michael Mohan
2014	Redaction	Tim Sanger
2014	Vicious Circles	Marcel Sarmiento
2015	Pink Grapefruit	Michael Mohan
2015	Grand Zero	Kevin Oeser
2015	Party Animal	Adam Bowers
2015	Connected	Luke Gilford
2016	How Was Burning Man?	Kevin Oeser
2017	Game	Jeannie Donohoe
2018	Deb	Noga Pnueli
2018	End Times	Bobby Miller
2018	Maradentro	Christa Boarini
2020	The Priest	Mike Vukadinovhich

== Television series ==
Year	Series	Creator(s)	Notes
2016	Judgment Day: Prison or Parole?	Joe Berlinger	
2016	Garfunkel and Oates: Trying to Be Special	Jeremy Konner; Riki Lindhome	TV special
2016	Virtually Mike and Nora	Nora Kirkpatrick; Mike O'Brien	
2017	Killing Richard Glossip	Joe Berlinger; Kevin Huffman	
2017	High & Mighty	Cesar Mazariegos	
2017	Breakarate	Patrick Cox; Clay Baird	
2018	Door No. 1	Nora Kirkpatrick; Chris W. Smith	
2018–19	Into the Dark	—N/a	2 episodes: "Flesh & Blood" "All That We Destroy"
