= Adam Clark =

Adam Clark may refer to:

- Adam Christian Clark (born 1980), film director
- Adam Clark (American football coach), American football coach
- Adam Clark (engineer) (1811–1866), Scottish civil engineer
- Adam Clark (meteorologist), American meteorologist
- Adam Clark (actor), actor in Star Trek: Enterprise

== See also ==
- Adam Clarke (disambiguation)
