= Happy Endings season 2 =

Second season of the American TV show "Happy Endings"

Happy Endings
- Season 2
- DVD cover
- No. of episodes: 21

Release
- Original network: ABC
- Original release: September 28, 2011 – April 4, 2012

Season chronology
- ← Previous; Season 1 Next → Season 3

The second season of Happy Endings, an American television series. ABC officially renewed Happy Endings for a second season on May 13, 2011. It was later announced it would move to a new time-slot on Wednesdays at 9:30pm, as a lead-in to new series Revenge. It premiered on September 28, 2011.

On 3 November 2011, ABC picked up the show for a full 22-episode second season. However the 21st episode to air was labeled as the season finale by ABC as they "needed" to premiere Don't Trust the B— in Apartment 23 on April 11, 2012. Despite the episode officially being held back for the third season, the 22nd episode aired on E4 in the UK on May 17, 2012, and other international markets, as part of the second season.

Although the season was not officially released on DVD until October 23, 2012, the DVD was included in a release that contains the first two seasons of the show that was released on August 14, 2012.

== Summary ==
From cranky landlords, nosy childhood friends, Brozilians, gym bullies, sexy Halloween costumes, to racist parrots. Season two offers more of the six best friends navigating life and love in Chicago's hip downtown. Dave and Alex have managed to stay friends, and continue to reshuffle their feelings. Jane tests out her maternal instincts while hubby Brad unwittingly gets a "work wife." Max actually lands the perfect boyfriend that the gang falls in love with. Meanwhile, "The Year of Penny" is off to a rocky start as Penny struggles with everything from birthday curses to 1980s-themed scavenger hunts.

== Cast ==
=== Starring ===
- Eliza Coupe as Jane Kerkovich-Williams
- Elisha Cuthbert as Alex Kerkovich
- Zachary Knighton as Dave Rose
- Adam Pally as Max Blum
- Damon Wayans, Jr. as Brad Williams
- Casey Wilson as Penny Hartz

=== Recurring ===
- Seth Morris as Scotty (3 episodes)
- James Wolk as Grant (3 episodes)
- Megan Mullally as Dana Hartz (2 episodes)
- Brandon Johnson as Daryl (2 episodes)
- Stephen Guarino as Derrick (2 episodes)
- Larry Wilmore as Mr. Forristal (2 episodes)
- Mary Elizabeth Ellis as Daphne Wilson (1 episode)
- Brian Austin Green as Chris (1 episode)
- Tom Kenny as Tyler Kerkovich (1 episode)
- Michael McKean as 'Big' Dave Rose (1 episode)
- Paul Scheer as Avi (1 episode)
- Mikaela Hoover as Jackie (1 episode)

=== Notable guest stars ===
- Derek Waters as Glaze ("Blax, Snake, Home")
- Megan Park as Chloe ("Baby Steps")
- Nicole Gale Anderson as Madison ("Baby Steps")
- Alex Kapp Horner as Kelly ("Baby Steps")
- Noureen DeWulf as Molly ("Secrets and Limos")
- Matt Besser as Rick ("Spooky Endings")
- David Walton as Henry ("Spooky Endings")
- Brent Musburger as himself ("Lying Around")
- Fred Savage as himself ("Lying Around")
- Riki Lindhome as Angie ("The Code War")
- Angelique Cabral as Vanessa ("The Code War")
- Hayes MacArthur as Steven ("The Code War")
- Rob Riggle as Drew ("Full Court Dress")
- Chryssie Whitehead as Janet ("Full Court Dress")
- Gary Anthony Williams as Officer Jones ("Grinches Be Crazy")
- Jamie Denbo as Gita ("Grinches Be Crazy")
- Ken Marino as Richard Rickman ("The Shrink, the Dare, Her Date and Her Brother")
- Sarah Wright as Nikki ("The Shrink, the Dare, Her Date and Her Brother")
- Ed Begley, Jr. as himself ("Meat the Parrots")
- Ryan Hansen as Jeff Niebert ("Makin' Changes!")
- Lindsey Kraft as Lindsay ("The St. Valentine's Day Maxssacre")
- Colin Hanks as himself ("Cocktails & Dreams")
- Richard Edson as himself ("The Kerkovich Way")
- Bobby Moynihan as Corey ("You Snooze, You Bruise")
- Ben Falcone as Darren ("Big White Lies")

== Episodes ==
| No. overall | No. in season | Title | Directed by | Written by | Original release date | Prod. code | US viewers (millions) |
|---|---|---|---|---|---|---|---|
| 14 | 1 | "Blax, Snake, Home" | Anthony Russo | Josh Bycel | September 28, 2011 | 201 | 7.25 |
The gang get together to mark the first anniversary of Alex and Dave’s non-wedding, which leads Alex and Dave to decide that they should be honest with each other; Penny buys a new condo and declares that it's "The Year of Penny" -- the year where everything will start going her way. After her optimism is deflated when finding out her new home has a "spinster curse", the gang tries to cheer her up at her house-warming party; Max tries to find out why Brad hasn't been hanging out with him lately.
| 15 | 2 | "Baby Steps" | Tristram Shapeero | Gail Lerner | October 5, 2011 | 202 | 6.70 |
Alex and Penny befriend a group of snotty teenage girls, after Alex's shop becomes their new hangout when she releases a line of slogan t-shirts for babies; Jane searches for the now 11-year-old girl she thinks is the result of the egg she donated in college; Max starts working at Dave's food truck.
| 16 | 3 | "Yesandwitch" | Joe Russo | Leila Strachan | October 12, 2011 | 203 | 7.29 |
Penny's mom Dana (Megan Mullally) comes to town for a gig singing at a boat show. However, Penny learns that her mom's inspiring upbeat attitude is hiding some bad news, which leads Penny to decide to give her mom a reality check; Max plays tour guide to some tourists in his new limo with the help of Brad and Jane; Dave finds out that he is 1/16th Navajo and Alex becomes obsessed with a new exercise gadget called the "necksercizer".
| 17 | 4 | "Secrets and Limos" | Anthony Russo | Hilary Winston | October 19, 2011 | 204 | 6.81 |
Jane convinces Penny to make a vision board to visualize the path to her dreams, although everything doesn't go according to plan; Brad has a hard time impressing his humorless boss (Larry Wilmore), until he flips for Max's limo; Dave keeps his new girlfriend (Noureen DeWulf) a secret from the gang, but Alex finds out.
| 18 | 5 | "Spooky Endings" | Fred Savage | Daniel Libman & Matthew Libman | October 26, 2011 | 205 | 8.33 |
Penny, Max, Dave and Alex head to a Halloween warehouse party, where their costumes don't have the effect they anticipated. Meanwhile, Jane and Brad spend their Halloween house sitting for some friends in the suburbs.
| 19 | 6 | "Lying Around" | Fred Savage | Prentice Penny | November 2, 2011 | 206 | 7.62 |
Brad discovers that Jane's old sorority sister is coming for a visit, so he lies and says he has a work retreat out of town, when he's actually on "staycation" in a fancy hotel in the city; Penny sets Alex on a date with Liam (Josh Casaubon) but becomes jealous of his romantic gestures, while Alex thinks his dates are a bit over-the-top; Max helps Dave film a television commercial for the "Steak Me Home Tonight" food truck.
| 20 | 7 | "The Code War" | Rob Greenberg | Josh Bycel | November 16, 2011 | 208 | 6.94 |
When Max's high school girlfriend Angie (Riki Lindhome), the girl he dated before he realized he was gay, returns to town, Penny (who was Max's girlfriend in college) starts to feel jealous, but then she tries to befriend her. Meanwhile, Alex starts to develop an unusual crush on Max. When Dave starts dating Angie, Max becomes angry and declares a "code war"; Jane finds out that Brad has a "work wife", so she sets her sights on Steven (Hayes MacArthur), the head of human resources at her workplace, with the intent of making him her "work husband".
| 21 | 8 | "Full Court Dress" | Victor Nelli, Jr. | Sierra Teller Ornelas | November 23, 2011 | 207 | 7.11 |
Jane is shocked when Alex's attempt to design a dress for a charity event for her, turns out looking good, until she realizes Alex just used another dress and pretended it was the one she made; Penny helps Max babysit his niece and nephew, but she becomes competitive for the kids affection, after realizing they like Max better than her; Dave and Brad don't quite get the friendship they were hoping for out of Drew (Rob Riggle), their weird mailman.
| 22 | 9 | "Grinches Be Crazy" | Jeff Melman | Hilary Winston | December 7, 2011 | 209 | 6.38 |
Max agrees to dress up as Santa for Penny's charity event; Jane and Brad accidentally give their housekeeper (Jamie Denbo) the envelope stuffed with the money for their big Christmas getaway to Turks & Caicos, instead of the $200 Christmas tip they had planned -- and scheme a way to get the cash back; Dave cashes in all the homemade coupons Alex made, and gave him as gifts from past Christmases.
| 23 | 10 | "The Shrink, The Dare, Her Date and Her Brother" | Jeff Melman | Gail Lerner | January 4, 2012 | 211 | 7.48 |
Dave reacts oddly when his therapist (Ken Marino) starts dating Penny; Jane and Max fight over ownership of a sweater; Brad and Alex have a hard time trying to bond with each other until they discover their mutual love of romantic comedies.
| 24 | 11 | "Meat The Parrots" "Meet The Parrots" | Jay Chandrasekhar | Prentice Penny | January 11, 2012 | 214 | 6.68 |
Dave's father (Michael McKean) comes to town to introduce his new girlfriend, who turns out to be Penny's mother, Dana. Penny couldn't be more thrilled that her mother has a new man in her life, while Dave reacts rather childishly to the news; Alex decides to adopt a pet parrot that turns out to be not so charming, spewing nonstop racist and homophobic rhetoric; Alex enlists Brad and Max's help, as she is convinced the Chinese restaurant next door is a front for a brothel.
| 25 | 12 | "Makin' Changes!" | Michael Patrick Jann | Gil Ozeri & Jackie Clarke | January 18, 2012 | 212 | 6.05 |
Jane convinces Penny to stop changing herself for every guy she dates, and instead to change the guy to suit her needs. Penny's first experiment is Jeff (Ryan Hansen), a slacker who is 30 going on 20. Meanwhile, when Brad overhears Jane bragging to Penny about how she completely made him over after they met, he rebels, and starts walking, talking and dressing like his college-era self. And Alex and Max stage an "inter-V-ntion" to stop Dave from his obsession with v-necked T-shirts.
| 26 | 13 | "The St. Valentine's Day Maxssacre" | Joe Russo | Matthew Libman & Daniel Libman | February 8, 2012 | 213 | 6.70 |
Penny has a new boyfriend she wants to dump, but decides she should observe the "breakup window" and string him along until after Valentine's Day; Dave is afraid his new girlfriend is getting ready to do the same to him; Alex, an expert on all things Valentine's, goes looking for a party in the sketchy part of town; and Brad's hopes for a perfect night out for Jane are dashed when a dental appointment goes terribly wrong. But they don't have anything on Max, who picks up a couple with his limo only to find that one of the passengers is Grant (James Wolk), the boyfriend he broke up with a year ago.
| 27 | 14 | "Everybody Loves Grant" | Kyle Newacheck | Leila Strachan | February 15, 2012 | 215 | 5.44 |
When the whole gang, with the exception of Dave, falls in love with Grant, Max wonders if he really is good enough to date the "perfect" guy. Meanwhile, Dave sets out to prove he's way cooler than Max's new boyfriend, and Penny tries to get the gang to recognize her and new boyfriend Sean (David Clayton Rogers) as the perfect pair for couples dating.
| 28 | 15 | "The Butterfly Effect Effect" "Spring Smackdown" | Victor Nelli, Jr. | Jonathan Groff & Sierra Teller Ornelas | February 22, 2012 | 216 | 5.45 |
The episode starts with Alex, Dave, and Penny playing indoor baseball in Dave's apartment. Soon after, they end the game and discuss how they wish it were spring. They talk about how the beginning of spring is heralded by Brad and Jane's annual "Spring Smackdown", an annual fight between Brad and Jane that signals spring is coming and that Max can come out of hibernation (throughout the episode Max acts increasingly like a bear, including attacking hanging meat, growling, eating out of a garbage can, and riding a unicycle). Brad and Jane arrive and seem like they will start the fight, but do not.
| 29 | 16 | "Cocktails & Dreams" | Rob Greenberg | David Caspe, Matthew Libman & Daniel Libman | February 29, 2012 | 217 | 5.94 |
Dave gets a liquor license for his food truck, making it a new, speakeasy-styled, hot spot; the gang avoids Dave because his signature drink gives them sex dreams about him. Along the way, Dave's popularity of his truck gets to his head, leading to him making stupid decisions, including hosting a birthday party for and forming a strange friendship with Colin Hanks. At the end of the episode, Alex, after drinking one of Dave's drinks, wakes up in bed with him.
| 30 | 17 | "The Kerkovich Way" | Steven Sprung | Todd Linden | March 7, 2012 | 218 | 4.49 |
A panicked Alex enlists Jane's help in convincing Dave that something he's certain happened never did using "The Kerkovich Way", an ancient Serbian memory-wiping technique passed down through the Kerkovich family. Meanwhile, Penny and Max are determined to finally beat an annoyingly perfect couple (Morgan Walsh and Brice Williams) in the annual "Rosalita's Run" scavenger hunt.
| 31 | 18 | "Party of Six" | Fred Goss | Lon Zimmet & Dan Rubin | March 14, 2012 | 219 | 5.27 |
After years of bad luck celebrating Penny's birthday, the gang starts to believe the day is cursed.
| 32 | 19 | "You Snooze, You Bruise" | Jay Chandrasekhar | Leila Strachan | March 21, 2012 | 210 | 4.10 |
Dave finds himself bullied at the gym by Corey (Bobby Moynihan), and former bully Alex coaches him on how to fight back. Meanwhile, the residents at Brad and Jane's condo are fed up with Jane being too controlling as president of their home owners' association, and rise up to challenge her for the job. But when Penny tells Jane to "sleep on it" before she does anything rash, her advice results in an all-new, suddenly chilled out Jane.
| 33 | 20 | "Big White Lies" | Gail Mancuso | Gail Lerner | March 28, 2012 | 220 | 4.13 |
Things spiral out of control after Penny tells a white lie to avoid an irritating childhood friend (Mary Elizabeth Ellis); Dave and Max's lonely and jealous landlord (Ben Falcone) falls for Alex.
| 34 | 21 | "Four Weddings and a Funeral (Minus Three Weddings and One Funeral)" | Rob Greenberg | Leila Strachan & Josh Bycel | April 4, 2012 | 222 | 3.67 |
The gang find themselves at yet another wedding, this time the nuptials of Derrick (Stephen Guarino) and Eric (Nate Smith). Will there be "DRAMA", to quote Derrick? Of course, as Brad struggles to tell Jane something important; Jane tries to find a way to help Eric hide the fact that the pricey reception must be down-scaled; and Max tries to find the courage to perform with his old all-male Madonna cover band. Meanwhile, a dateless Penny is sad that she's at another wedding alone, until she meets a cute guy (Brian Austin Green) via Skype.

== Production ==
ABC officially renewed Happy Endings for a second season on May 13, 2011. On June 27, 2011, with the reveal of ABC 2011-12 schedule, it was announced the series would be moving to an earlier time-slot of 9:30 pm Eastern/8:30 pm Central on Wednesdays as a lead-in to new series, Revenge.

== Reception ==
=== Critical reception ===
The second season currently holds an average of 67 out of 100 from critics on Metacritic, which indicates generally favorable reviews.

Tom Gliatto from People said the series "has clicked as one of prime-time's most sophisticated ensemble comedies". While TV Guide's Matt Roush said the show was "an under-inspired Friends-wannabe", he praised the performances of Casey Wilson and Adam Pally. On The A.V. Club, the season contains the highest graded episode of the series to-date, "The Butterfly Effect Effect", with a grade of an A on a scale of A to F.

=== U.S. Ratings ===
| # | Episode | Original air date | Timeslot (EST) | Viewers (millions) | Ratings share (Adults 18-49) |
|---|---|---|---|---|---|
| 1 | "Blax, Snake, Home" | September 28, 2011 | Wednesday 9:30PM | 7.25 | 3.1/8 |
| 2 | "Baby Steps" | October 5, 2011 | Wednesday 9:30PM | 6.70 | 2.8/7 |
| 3 | "Yesandwitch" | October 12, 2011 | Wednesday 9:30PM | 7.29 | 3.2/8 |
| 4 | "Secrets and Limos" | October 19, 2011 | Wednesday 9:30PM | 6.81 | 3.0/7 |
| 5 | "Spooky Endings" | October 26, 2011 | Wednesday 9:30PM | 8.33 | 3.5/9 |
| 6 | "Lying Around" | November 2, 2011 | Wednesday 9:30PM | 7.62 | 3.4/8 |
| 7 | "The Code War" | November 16, 2011 | Wednesday 9:30PM | 6.94 | 3.2/8 |
| 8 | "Full Court Dress" | November 23, 2011 | Wednesday 9:30PM | 7.11 | 2.6/7 |
| 9 | "Grinches Be Crazy" | December 7, 2011 | Wednesday 9:30PM | 6.38 | 2.8/7 |
| 10 | "The Shrink, the Dare, Her Date and Her Brother" | January 4, 2012 | Wednesday 9:30PM | 7.48 | 3.2/8 |
| 11 | "Meat the Parrots" | January 11, 2012 | Wednesday 9:30PM | 6.68 | 3.0/8 |
| 12 | "Makin' Changes!" | January 18, 2012 | Wednesday 9:30PM | 6.05 | 2.9/7 |
| 13 | "The St. Valentine's Day Maxssacre" | February 8, 2012 | Wednesday 9:30PM | 6.70 | 2.9/7 |
| 14 | "Everybody Loves Grant" | February 15, 2012 | Wednesday 9:30PM | 5.44 | 2.4/6 |
| 15 | "The Butterfly Effect Effect" | February 22, 2012 | Wednesday 9:30PM | 5.45 | 2.4/6 |
| 16 | "Cocktails & Dreams" | February 29, 2012 | Wednesday 9:30PM | 5.94 | 2.7/7 |
| 17 | "The Kerkovich Way" | March 7, 2012 | Wednesday 9:30PM | 4.49 | 2.0/5 |
| 18 | "Party of Six" | March 14, 2012 | Wednesday 9:30PM | 5.27 | 2.4/6 |
| 19 | "You Snooze, You Bruise" | March 21, 2012 | Wednesday 9:30PM | 4.10 | 1.8/5 |
| 20 | "Big White Lies" | March 28, 2012 | Wednesday 9:30PM | 4.13 | 1.9/5 |
| 21 | "Four Weddings and a Funeral (Minus Three Weddings and One Funeral)" | April 4, 2012 | Wednesday 9:30PM | 3.67 | 1.7/4 |

== Home media ==
Happy Endings: The Complete Second Season
| Set details | | | Special features |
| 21 episodes; 3-disc set; 1.85:1 aspect ratio; Languages: English (Dolby Digital 5.1, with subtitles) | | | Deleted Scenes; Outtakes |
| Release dates | | | Deleted Scenes; Outtakes |
| Region 1 | Region 2 | Region 4 | Deleted Scenes; Outtakes |
| October 23, 2012 | TBA | TBA | Deleted Scenes; Outtakes |
| Blu-ray release dates | | | Deleted Scenes; Outtakes |
| Region A | Region B | Region C | Deleted Scenes; Outtakes |
| August 7, 2018 (Complete Series Release) | TBA | TBA | Deleted Scenes; Outtakes |
