= Climate of the Hunter =

2019 American horror film

- Promotional release poster
- Directed by: Mickey Reece
- Written by: Mickey Reece; John Selvidge
- Produced by: Jacob Ryan Snovel
- Starring: Mary Buss; Ginger Gilmartin; Ben Hall
- Music by: Nicholas Poss
- Production companies: Divide/Conquer; VisionChaos Productions
- Distributed by: Dark Star Pictures
- Release date: September 2019 (Fantastic Fest)
- Running time: 82 minutes
- Country: United States
- Language: English

Climate of the Hunter is a 2019 American horror film directed by Mickey Reece, who co-wrote the film with John Selvidge. It stars Mary Buss and Ginger Gilmartin as sisters Elizabeth and Alma, who attempt to reconnect with their friend Wesley (Ben Hall), who may or may not be a vampire, after twenty years apart.

The film premiered at Fantastic Fest in Austin, Texas in September 2019. It received a limited theatrical release on December 18, 2020, followed by a wider video-on-demand and digital release on January 12, 2021.

== Cast ==
- Ginger Gilmartin as Alma
- Mary Buss as Elizabeth
- Ben Hall as Wesley
- Jacob Snovel as BJ Beavers
- Laurie Cummings as Genevieve
- Sheridan McMichael as Percy
- Danielle Evon Ploeger as Rose

== Release ==
Climate of the Hunter premiered at Fantastic Fest in Austin, Texas in September 2019. It later screened at the Nashville Film Festival on October 9, 2019. In 2020, the film screened in Quebec, Canada as part of the Fantasia International Film Festival.

Distributor Dark Star Pictures released the film in select venues on December 18, 2020, followed by a wider video-on-demand and digital release on January 12, 2021.

== Reception ==
On Rotten Tomatoes, the film has an approval rating of 85% based on 33 reviews, with an average rating of 7/10. The site's critical consensus reads, "Strong direction and an arresting sense of visual style make the vampire love triangle Climate of the Hunter a balmy treat for fans of off-kilter horror."

Leigh Monson of Birth. Movies. Death. called Climate of the Hunter "a film dripping in sensuously mysterious atmosphere, but instead of drowning its characters in absurdity like an overdressed salad, it uses its director's bizarre proclivities as a garnish to a relatable, more readily consumable story." Rachel Reeves of Rue Morgue called the film "a surreal cinematic treat that gleefully walks the fine line between trippy arthouse and bemusement with ease. An unquestionably unique entry in the heavily saturated vampire genre, its greatest trick may lie in the question of whether it's actually a vampire film at all."
