= Happy Endings season 1 =

Happy Endings
- Season 1
- DVD cover
- No. of episodes: 13

Release
- Original network: ABC
- Original release: April 13 – August 24, 2011

Season chronology
- Next → Season 2

The first season of Happy Endings, an American television series, premiered on April 13, 2011 and concluded on August 24 of the same year. ABC officially picked up the show on May 18, 2010, where it premiered on April as a mid-season replacement, with a one-hour premiere of two back-to-back episodes starting at 9:30 pm ET/PT. In the weeks that followed, the show continued to air back-to-back episodes that began airing at 10:00 pm ET/PT.

== Cast ==
=== Starring ===
- Eliza Coupe as Jane Kerkovich-Williams
- Elisha Cuthbert as Alex Kerkovich
- Zachary Knighton as Dave Rose
- Adam Pally as Max Blum
- Damon Wayans, Jr. as Brad Williams
- Casey Wilson as Penny Hartz

=== Recurring ===
- Stephen Guarino as Derrick (2 episodes)
- Travis Van Winkle as Bo Bazinski (2 episodes)
- Seth Morris as Scotty (1 episode)
- Paul Scheer as Avi (1 episode)
- Mikaela Hoover as Jackie (1 episode)

=== Notable guest stars ===
- Angelique Cabral as Waitress ("Pilot")
- Brett Gelman as Carl ("Your Couples Friends & Neighbors")
- Danielle Schneider as Dianne ("Your Couples Friends & Neighbors")
- Alan Rachins as Howard Blum ("Mein Coming Out")
- Caroline Aaron as Pauline Blum ("Mein Coming Out")
- Damon Wayans as Francis Williams ("Like Father, Like Gun")
- Rob Huebel as Alan Fitzgerald ("You've Got Male")
- Max Greenfield as Ian ("You've Got Male")
- Nat Faxon as Chef Leslie ("Bo Fight")
- Jon Daly as Brody Daniels ("Barefoot Pedaler")
- Nick Thune as Tommy ("Barefoot Pedaler")
- June Diane Raphael as Melinda Shershow ("The Shershow Redemption")
- T.J. Miller as Jason Shershow ("The Shershow Redemption")
- Gina Rodriguez as Rita ("Why Can't You Read Me")
- Meagen Fay as Barbara ("Why Can't You Read Me")
- Bre Blair as Kim ("Why Can't You Read Me")

== Episodes ==
The first season aired out of order. The series’ first season was presented in its proper production order on the season one DVD, was presented in broadcast order when it appeared on Hulu, and was presented in production order when it appeared on HBOMax.

No. overall	No. in season	Title	Directed by	Written by	Original release date	Prod. code	US viewers (millions)
1	1	"Pilot"	Anthony Russo & Joe Russo	David Caspe	April 13, 2011	HE101	7.30
Alex suddenly leaves Dave at the altar on the day of their wedding, putting their group of friends (Brad, Jane, Penny and Max) in an awkward position of having to choose sides. All these problems come to a head at Penny's birthday party the following week.
2	2	"The Quicksand Girlfriend"	Jeff Melman	Josh Bycel	April 13, 2011	HE105	5.70
Dave has a one night stand with a girl he met at a bar. Feeling bad about just blowing her off, he decides to call her the next morning. But things go awry when he finds himself in a new relationship and the girl constantly smothers him. Meanwhile, Jane tries to help Alex find a new roommate, and Penny decides to find herself a more stereotypical "gay husband" to hang out with, after becoming tired of Max not being traditionally "gay enough" for her liking.
3	3	"Your Couples Friends & Neighbors"	Fred Savage	Josh Bycel	April 20, 2011	HE109	4.59
Jane convinces Brad to try and befriend a more sophisticated married couple. Max and Dave try to figure out why their stuff starts to disappear from their apartment, and Alex decides she is ready to start dating again after finding out Dave has been dating.
4	4	"Mein Coming Out"	Jeff Melman	Gail Lerner	April 20, 2011	HE108	3.86
Max's parents (Alan Rachins and Caroline Aaron) come to visit and the gang tries to convince him to finally come out to them although he is afraid of how they would react. Penny meets the man of her dreams on a blind date, who she later finds out happens to have a rather infamous last name.
5	5	"Like Father, Like Gun"	Tristram Shapeero	Daniel Libman & Matthew Libman	April 27, 2011	HE112	5.17
Brad's dad, who's in town for some medical exams, gets a clean bill of health from the doctor and proceeds to let loose much to Brad's discomfort. Penny who once studied in Italy is excited when she meets a gorgeous Italian guy. Problem is, he speaks no English and she finds she can only speak Italian when she's drunk.
6	6	"Of Mice & Jazz-Kwon-Do"	Troy Miller	Rob Kerkovich & Todd Waldman	May 4, 2011	HE107	3.88
Max doesn't act very grateful when Brad tries to hook him up with a guy from work and Penny has second thoughts after asking Jane along to her martial arts class. Dave misses his old digs as he adjusts to living with Max so he starts hanging out at Alex's place helping out with odd jobs.
7	7	"Dave of the Dead"	Randall Einhorn	Leila Strachan	May 4, 2011	HE104	3.26
The gang starts thinking about the coming "zombie apocalypse" after watching a horror movie, so Max and Jane compete to see who would survive if zombies did take over. For his response, Dave decides to quit his boring job and open a restaurant. Trying to keep up with her current boyfriend and his friends leaves Penny exhausted.
8	8	"The Girl with the David Tattoo"	Jay Chandrasekhar	Prentice Penny	May 11, 2011	HE111	4.18
Now that Alex and Dave are no longer a couple, those his-and-hers tattoos don't seem like such a good idea anymore. Jane meddles when Max passes on what she considers the perfect guy and there are unexpected results when Brad takes on what he thinks is the world's worst waiter.
9	9	"You've Got Male"	Matt Shakman	Leila Strachan	May 11, 2011	HE110	3.46
Dave's excited that the high school teacher who had a big influence on his life is in town. But when Penny goes on a date with Alan, she realizes he isn't quite what Dave thinks. Max organizes a protest against the coffee chain that has moved into the shop next to Alex's.
10	10	"Bo Fight"	Joe Russo	David Caspe	May 18, 2011	HE102	3.70
Alex's string of "girls' nights out" start to get on Penny's nerves; Max convinces Dave to track down and fight the man who ruined his wedding; Jane and Brad try to have a night out on the town.
11	11	"Barefoot Pedaler"	Anthony Russo	Gail Lerner	May 18, 2011	HE103	3.10
A concert outing goes awry because of Alex and Dave's constant bickering; Jane gets progressively drunker throughout the night; Penny is determined to get backstage to reunite with the band's electric fiddler (Nick Thune) who she dated years before.
12	12	"The Shershow Redemption"	Lee Shallat-Chemel	Todd Linden, Sierra Teller Ornelas, Steve Basilone & Annie Mebane	May 25, 2011	HE113	4.02
Being invited to the wedding of old friend Shershow (T.J. Miller) creates unexpected consequences and feelings among the group. Brad and Jane discover unsettling news about their marital status; Alex agrees to act as Dave's wingman at the wedding; Penny pretends to be engaged to Derrick; Shershow's fiancé (June Diane Raphael) thinks that Alex is a "wedding jinx".
13	13	"Why Can't You Read Me?"	Lee Shallat-Chemel	Prentice Penny	August 24, 2011	HE106	2.98
Penny's assistant, nicknamed Ri-Ri, gets Penny a new high-tech cell phone. This phone makes Penny the star of a new reality TV show she doesn't even realize she's in.

== Production ==
On January 19, 2010, ABC green-lit the pilot episode, which was written by David Caspe and directed by Anthony Russo and Joe Russo. The show is from production companies Sony Pictures Television, ABC Studios, and executive producer Jamie Tarses' FanFare Productions. Executive producers are Jamie Tarses, Jonathan Groff and The Russo Brothers.

Casting announcements began in February 2010, with Damon Wayans, Jr. first cast as Brad, Jane's husband who does whatever she says. Next to join the series was Casey Wilson as Penny, the group's desperate and single friend. Eliza Coupe and Adam Pally shortly joined that cast, with Coupe playing Jane, Alex's control freak sister who is married to Brad, and Pally playing Max, Dave's close friend and roommate. Elisha Cuthbert later joined the cast as Alex, Dave's ex-fiancé who leaves him at the altar. Zachary Knighton was last actor to be cast as the newly single Dave.

The pilot was ordered to series on May 13, 2010, as a mid-season entry in the 2010–11 United States network television schedule.

ABC originally aired the episodes out of production order, affecting the continuity of the show. For example, Dave owns a food truck in the third episode to be aired, Your Couples Friends & Neighbors, though he doesn't get into the food truck business until the seventh episode to be aired, Dave of the Dead. The DVD release puts the episodes back into their intended order.

== Reception ==
=== Critical reception ===
The first season currently holds a 57 out of 100 rating from critics on Metacritic, which indicates mixed or average reviews.

While initially criticized, being negatively compared to several similar "relationship sitcoms" that had premiered earlier in the season - Perfect Couples, Mad Love, Traffic Light and Friends with Benefits - all of which were canceled after one season. The series also drew comparisons from the hit 1990s sitcom Friends. However, as the season progressed, the reviews from critics became much warmer - with some admitting that it had grown on them and that it had improved since the pilot.

=== U.S. Ratings ===
The show's first season averaged 4 million viewers and a 1.7 rating in the adults among the 18-49 age demographic.

#	Episode	Original air date	Timeslot (EST)	Viewers (millions)	Ratings share (Adults 18-49)
1	"Pilot"	April 13, 2011	Wednesday 9:31PM	7.301	2.8/7
2	"The Quicksand Girlfriend"	April 13, 2011	Wednesday 10PM	5.700	2.3/6
3	"Your Couples Friends & Neighbors"	April 20, 2011	Wednesday 10PM	4.591	1.8/5
4	"Mein Coming Out	April 20, 2011	Wednesday 10:30PM	3.875	1.6/4
5	"Like Father, Like Gun"	April 27, 2011	Wednesday 10PM	5.169	2.1/5
6	"Of Mice & Jazz-Kwon-Do"	May 4, 2011	Wednesday 10PM	3.88	1.7/4
7	"Dave of the Dead"	May 4, 2011	Wednesday 10:30PM	3.26	1.4/4
8	"The Girl With the David Tattoo"	May 11, 2011	Wednesday 10PM	4.178	1.7/4
9	"You've Got Male"	May 11, 2011	Wednesday 10:30PM	3.463	1.4/4
10	"Bo Fight"	May 18, 2011	Wednesday 10PM	3.70	1.5/4
11	"Barefoot Pedaler"	May 18, 2011	Wednesday 10:30PM	3.10	1.3/3
12	"The Shershow Redemption"	May 25, 2011	Wednesday 10:30PM	4.02	1.7/4
13	"Why Can't You Read Me?"	August 24, 2011	Wednesday 9:30PM	2.98	1.3/4

== Home media ==
Happy Endings: The Complete First Season
Set details			Special features
13 episodes; 2-disc set; 1.85:1 aspect ratio; Languages: English (Dolby Digital 5.1, with subtitles)			Banana Republic Style Previews; The Girls of Happy Endings; The Guys of Happy Endings; Deleted Scenes; Outtakes; Mike Relm Remix; Mark Douglas Interview with Adam Pally and Casey Wilson; Parody Theme Song
DVD release dates			Banana Republic Style Previews; The Girls of Happy Endings; The Guys of Happy Endings; Deleted Scenes; Outtakes; Mike Relm Remix; Mark Douglas Interview with Adam Pally and Casey Wilson; Parody Theme Song
Region 1	Region 2	Region 4	Banana Republic Style Previews; The Girls of Happy Endings; The Guys of Happy Endings; Deleted Scenes; Outtakes; Mike Relm Remix; Mark Douglas Interview with Adam Pally and Casey Wilson; Parody Theme Song
September 20, 2011	March 12, 2012	August 15, 2012	Banana Republic Style Previews; The Girls of Happy Endings; The Guys of Happy Endings; Deleted Scenes; Outtakes; Mike Relm Remix; Mark Douglas Interview with Adam Pally and Casey Wilson; Parody Theme Song
Blu-ray release dates			Banana Republic Style Previews; The Girls of Happy Endings; The Guys of Happy Endings; Deleted Scenes; Outtakes; Mike Relm Remix; Mark Douglas Interview with Adam Pally and Casey Wilson; Parody Theme Song
Region A	Region B	Region C	Banana Republic Style Previews; The Girls of Happy Endings; The Guys of Happy Endings; Deleted Scenes; Outtakes; Mike Relm Remix; Mark Douglas Interview with Adam Pally and Casey Wilson; Parody Theme Song
August 7, 2018 (Complete Series Release)	TBA	TBA	Banana Republic Style Previews; The Girls of Happy Endings; The Guys of Happy Endings; Deleted Scenes; Outtakes; Mike Relm Remix; Mark Douglas Interview with Adam Pally and Casey Wilson; Parody Theme Song
