= Rex Is Not Your Lawyer =

American legal drama television pilot

- Genre: Legal drama; Comedy drama
- Written by: Andrew Leeds; David Lampson
- Starring: David Tennant; Jerry O'Connell; Abigail Spencer; Jane Curtin; Jeffrey Tambor
- Country of origin: United States
- Original language: English

Production
- Executive producers: Barry Schindel; Andrew Leeds; David Lampson; Gail Berman; Lloyd Braun
- Running time: 42 minutes
- Production companies: BermanBraun; Universal Media Studios

Original release
- Network: NBC

Rex Is Not Your Lawyer is an American legal comedy-drama television pilot developed by Gail Berman and Lloyd Braun for NBC. The pilot show was produced by BermanBraun and Universal Media Studios. Andrew Leeds and David Lampson wrote the pilot, which was directed by David Semel. David Tennant starred as Rex Alexander, an anxiety-ridden top litigator who coaches his clients to represent themselves in the courtroom.

== Plot ==
Rex is Not Your Lawyer (2010) starred David Tennant as Rex Alexander, a top litigator who becomes so crippled by panic attacks that he can no longer appear in the courtroom and starts coaching his clients to represent themselves. The pilot episode, titled "Mabel Howard's Wrongful Termination," focused on a case involving private school bus driver Mabel Howard (Cleo King).

== Cast ==
- David Tennant as Rex Alexander, an attorney who suffers an anxiety disorder
- Jeffrey Tambor as Alexander's psychiatrist who also has anxiety disorders
- Abigail Spencer as Lindsey Steers, an ambitious attorney and Alexander's fiancée
- Jane Curtin as Alexander's mother and a successful law professor
- Jerry O'Connell as a good-natured attorney who is secretly in love with Steers
- Lindsey Kraft as Alexander's legal assistant
- Cleo King as Alexander's client in a wrongful termination case

== Production ==
Rex Is Not Your Lawyer, from Universal Media Studios and BermanBraun, was first sold to NBC in Spring 2007 (on a "first-look" agreement through BermanBraun) but the production was stalled because of the Writer's Strike. The program was re-considered and then rejected for the 2008 season as well. With new programming executives in charge at NBC, and Barry Schindel from Law & Order on board as showrunner, the show was recommissioned in October 2009.

On November 3, 2009, Scottish actor David Tennant, who had recently concluded a run as the lead actor on Doctor Who, was announced as the lead actor in the role of Rex Alexander. Heroes actor Sendhil Ramamurthy was cast as Bruce Sweet, Rex's best friend—an ambitious but good-natured lawyer who was in Rex's shadow until Rex's career switch; Bruce's friendship with Rex becomes complicated when he falls in love with his pal's ex-fiancée, Lindsey Steers (Abigail Spencer). Other cast members in the pilot included Jane Curtin as Rex's mother Ellen, Jeffrey Tambor as Doctor Barry Fineman (originally "Doctor Barry Cohen" in earlier drafts of the script), Lindsey Kraft as Sophia Kraft (Rex's assistant), and Cleo King as Mabel Howard. The pilot was directed by David Semel.

The original setting for the comedy-drama script was Chicago, Illinois, but it was changed to Los Angeles, California prior to filming. Production began in late November or early December 2009, and scenes for the pilot were shot in and around Los Angeles, utilizing various streets and businesses in the downtown area including the Hilton Checkers (Hilton Hotels & Resorts) and Los Angeles Center Studios. On December 5, actor Jerry O'Connell was spotted on location and the next day it was announced that O'Connell had replaced Ramamurthy as Bruce. Golf scenes between Tennant and O'Connell were shot in three locations—at the Donald Trump National Golf Course in Palos Verdes, at a driving range in Koreatown, and outdoors on the Los Angeles Center Studio lot—and filming for the pilot was completed a few days before December 25.

During the December 2009 filming, on-set rumors indicated that the show could begin filming its regular series episodes within a matter of weeks, pending network approval. At the January 2010 Television Critics Association Press Tour, NBC's Angela Bromstad and Jeff Gaspin said that the pilot would be reviewed by executives and that "Rex" could become either a fast-track program airing in Spring 2010 (to help cover NBC's scheduling nightmare regarding the 2010 Tonight Show conflict) or it could be an early Fall 2010 program. During the early months of 2010, there were at least two test screenings for the pilot in April, one at Universal Parks & Resorts in Orlando, Florida and another at a screening room in Las Vegas, Nevada.

However, it was reported on January 24, 2010, that the sets had been dismantled and stored, and the pilot was later passed over for both the Spring and Fall network schedules. In August 2010, Tennant confirmed during an interview at the 2010 Emmys that the show was "truly and sincerely dead"; later that year he spoke candidly about the pilot in several British interviews.
