= Newly Single =

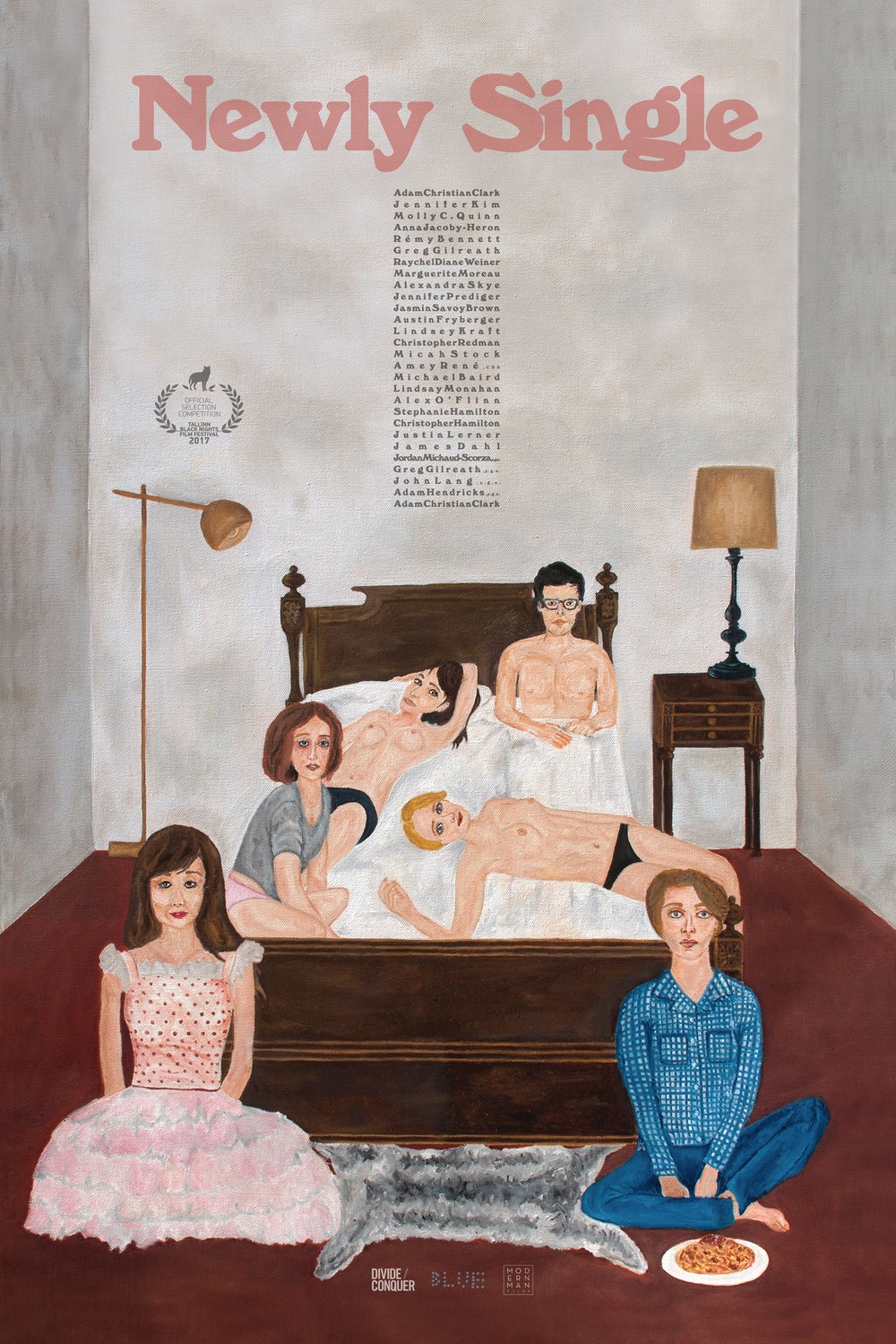
- PÖFF festival release poster
- Directed by: Adam Christian Clark
- Written by: Adam Christian Clark
- Produced by: Adam Hendricks; John H. Lang; Greg Gilreath; Jordan Michaud-Scorza; James Dahl
- Starring: Adam Christian Clark; Jennifer Kim; Molly C. Quinn; Anna Jacoby-Heron; Rémy Bennett; Greg Gilreath; Raychel Diane Weiner; Marguerite Moreau; Lindsey Kraft
- Cinematography: Christopher Hamilton
- Edited by: Alex O'Flinn
- Production companies: Divide/Conquer; Blueberry Films
- Distributed by: Gravitas Ventures
- Release dates: November 27, 2017 (Tallinn Black Nights Film Festival); December 7, 2018 (US Limited)
- Running time: 96 minutes
- Country: United States
- Language: English

Newly Single is a 2017 American arthouse meta dark comedy film written and directed by Adam Christian Clark.

Set in Downtown Los Angeles over the course of a winter, the script focuses on the dark and often funny moments of a newly-single and increasingly abrasive filmmaker.

== Plot ==
After ridiculing his girlfriend’s belief in Scientology, director Astor Williams Stevenson finds himself single and trying to discover what exactly it is he wants. At the same time he attempts to get a film off the ground and soon learns that his creative vision will not align with that of his crew. As Astor goes on a number of dates his abrasiveness and cynical attitude towards life seems to become ever more crystallised.

Reminiscent of great American cinema of the 1970s with a somewhat staccato structure made up of disparate moments, it is still a thoroughly modern affair replete with some graphic sexuality and an often harsh takedown on modern views of dating.

== Cast ==
- Adam Christian Clark as Astor
- Jennifer Kim as Izzy
- Molly C. Quinn as Valerie
- Anna Jacoby-Heron as Madeline
- Rémy Bennett as Francine
- Greg Gilreath as Lawrence
- Raychel Diane Weiner as Maria
- Marguerite Moreau as Charlee
- Alexandra Skye as Belle
- Jennifer Prediger as Emily
- Lindsey Kraft as Jackie
- Anthony Jeselnik as Anthony

== Production ==
The film's main location, Astor's apartment, was filmed in Clark's real-life apartment in Downtown Los Angeles' Continental Building.

== Release ==
Newly Single premiered in the main competition of the 2017 edition of PÖFF.

The film was released in North America in 2018 by Gravitas Ventures.

== Reception ==
The film holds an 88% rating, on Rotten Tomatoes.

The New York Times described the film as a dark comedy "probing the sexual and professional misadventures of a struggling filmmaker."

Rob Aldam of Backseat Mafia called the film "a brilliant take on narcissism and a total lack of self-awareness." In contrast, Chuck Foster of Film Threat barbs, "what could have been the next Tiny Furniture gets so wrapped up in its own narcissism that it falls flat with a dull thud".

Eye for Film's Jennie Kermode praised the film as "a powerful piece of work, as darkly hilarious as it is bleak."

== Music ==
Clark originally worked with a composer on an original score for Newly Single, but in the editing process decided to score the film entirely with archival music, largely unreleased American jazz music from the 1950s.
