= Adam Clarke (disambiguation) =

Adam Clarke was a theologian.

Adam Clarke may also refer to:

- Adam Vincent Clarke (born 1992), Canadian composer
- Adam Clarke (Durham University cricketer)
- Adam Clarke (Cambridge University cricketer)

== See also ==
- Adam Clark (disambiguation)
