= Diary of a Spy =

2022 film

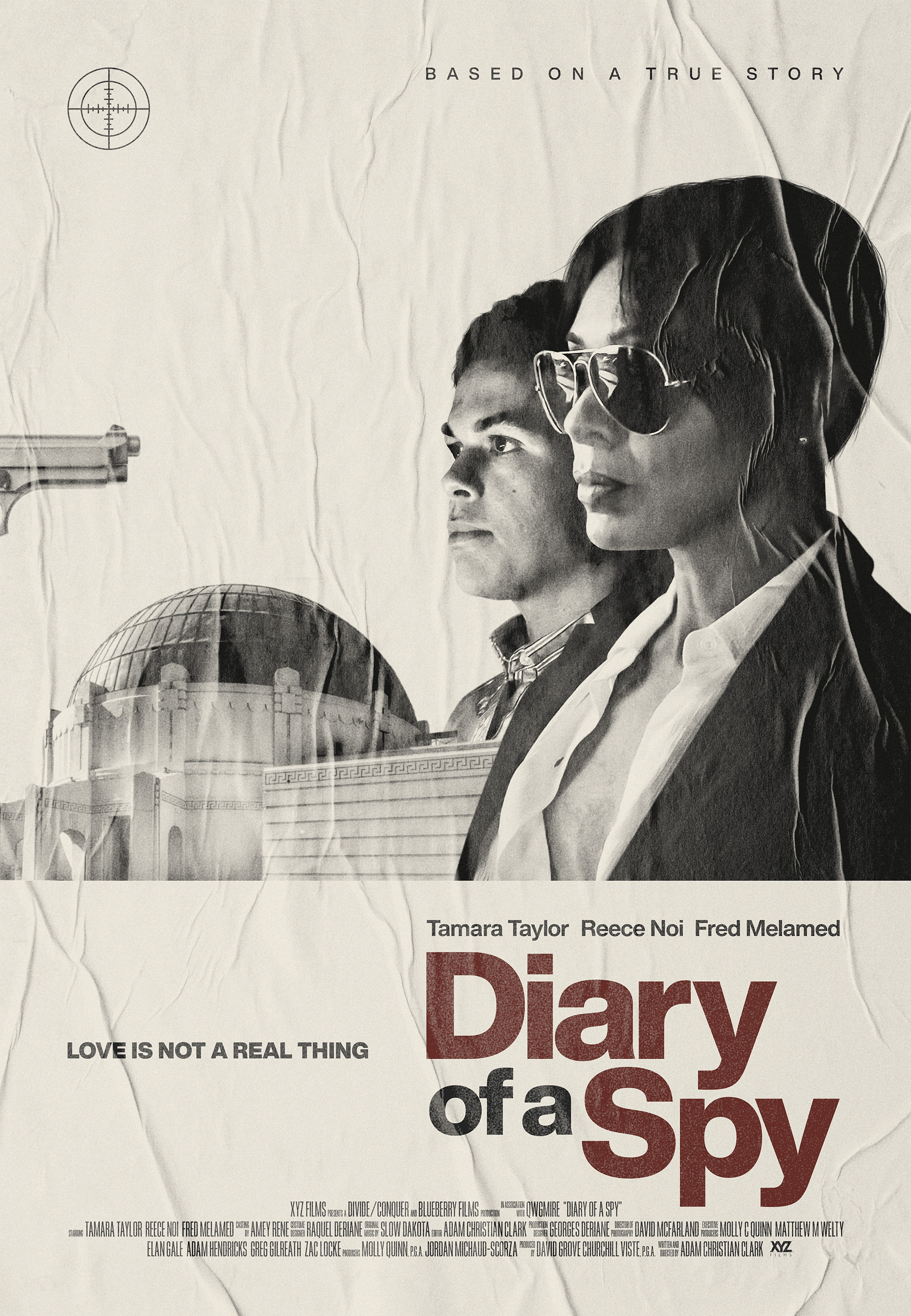
- North American release poster
- Directed by: Adam Christian Clark
- Written by: Adam Christian Clark
- Produced by: David Grove Churchill Viste; Molly C. Quinn; Jordan Michaud-Scorza
- Starring: Tamara Taylor; Reece Noi; Fred Melamed
- Cinematography: David McFarland
- Edited by: Adam Christian Clark
- Production companies: Divide/Conquer; Blueberry Films
- Distributed by: XYZ Films
- Release date: July 15, 2022 (US Limited)
- Running time: 99 minutes
- Country: United States
- Language: English

Diary of a Spy is a 2022 American arthouse spy romance film written and directed by Adam Christian Clark, starring Tamara Taylor, Reece Noi, and Fred Melamed.

== Plot ==
Anna (Tamara Taylor) is a disgraced spy: after living in Saudi Arabia for several years, all other members of her cell have been killed, and the blame (deserved or not) has fallen on her. Having squandered her salary on various addictions, she agrees to take on a job that will guarantee comfort for the rest of her life: develop an intimate relationship with Camden (Reece Noi), the tutor of Saudi princess Fatma, and gather intel.

== Cast ==
- Tamara Taylor as Anna
- Reece Noi as Camden
- Fred Melamed as James
- Jon Lindstrom as George
- Susan Sullivan as S
- Paulina Leija as Fahda
- Madeline Zima as Leila

== Production ==
Filmed under its original title Marzipan, Diary of a Spy was shot entirely on location in Los Angeles, CA.

== Release ==
Diary of a Spy was released in North America by XYZ Films on July 15, 2022.

== Reception ==
Diary of a Spy marks Clark's first foray into a genre space and was generally not as well received critically as his prior works of drama. The film currently holds a 57% rating on the review aggregator website Rotten Tomatoes.

Q.V. Hough of Vague Visages wrote, "'Diary of a Spy' mostly keeps viewers in the dark; it's unclear what makes the main characters tick. Anna and Camden are Dostoevskian figures in spirit, from a different tale, who seem lost in time." And, Josh Bell of Crooked Marquee barbed, "Clark seems determined to drain all possible suspense and excitement from the spy genre."

Though, Clark's somber style garnered some praise. Shelagh Rowan-Legg wrote for Screen Anarchy, "Diary of a Spy takes us into this dark, dangerous world via an often neglected side door, probing this story with observations on human vulnerability and the price of exploiting it."

== Music ==
Diary of a Spy marks the first original film score by Brooklyn recording artist Slow Dakota.
