= Nostalgia (2018 film) =

2018 film by Mark Pellington

- Theatrical release poster
- Directed by: Mark Pellington
- Screenplay by: Alex Ross Perry
- Story by: Alex Ross Perry; Mark Pellington
- Produced by: Tom Gorai; Mark Pellington; Josh Braun
- Starring: Jon Hamm; Catherine Keener; John Ortiz; Nick Offerman; James LeGros; Bruce Dern; Suyash Pachauri; Ellen Burstyn
- Cinematography: Matt Sakatani Roe
- Edited by: Arndt-Wulf Peemöller
- Music by: Laurent Eyquem
- Distributed by: Bleecker Street
- Release dates: January 6, 2018 (PSIFF); February 16, 2018 (United States)
- Running time: 114 minutes
- Country: United States
- Language: English

Nostalgia is a 2018 American drama film directed by Mark Pellington. The screenplay, written by Alex Ross Perry, is based on a story by Perry and Pellington. The film stars an ensemble cast led by Jon Hamm, Catherine Keener, John Ortiz, Nick Offerman, James LeGros, Bruce Dern, and Ellen Burstyn. It revolves around the lives of several people who become connected through loss.

== Plot ==
At a diner, middle-aged Daniel Kalman, an insurance agent, remarks on the beauty of sentimental jewelry worn by a waitress. He then visits Ronald Ashemore, an elderly architect living off a pension. His visit is for the purpose of evaluating Ashemore's possessions to satisfy granddaughter Bethany, and he's able to determine that a few pieces are worth enough value for an appraiser to look at.

Kalman's next visit is to Bethany and her husband. Pregnant, she is overwhelmed with being the sole decision-maker due to living the closest, but she does care deeply about her grandfather and does not wish to think of him dying. Back at the office Kalman studies the photographs he's taken that day, contemplating the lives lived.

The next day, his work takes him to meet Helen Greer, whose home has been destroyed by a fire of unknown origin. She laments how very little time she had to grab what keepsakes she could. She was able to save a signed baseball Kalman determines may have some value. They discuss things at a neighbor's house over coffee with another couple who've also lost their home. Kalman remarks how he always learns something new from listening to people's stories.

Helen stays with her son Henry and his wife Lisa. Discussion to place her in assisted living is met with indignity, as is the thought of selling her things for cash before the insurance kicks in.

Helen flies to Las Vegas with a case containing the baseball to meet with an appraiser. She settles in to her hotel room, takes in some gambling and dines solo. After much emotional turmoil, she meets Will Bleam to determine its worth. It is an authentic item, he says, and the signature is that of Ted Williams. Normally, most things he sees are worth $10–20,000 but he tells her this feels like it may be $80–100,000. Helen is amazed. After they converse awhile, Helen is finally able to let go of her husband's priceless keepsake. Later, Will gets a call from a potential buyer.

Will flies to his hometown in Virginia to meet older sister Donna. Will rides with Donna to their parents' house to go through things. The house is for sale and their parents have recently moved to a condo in Florida. Will is more matter-of-fact regarding the heirlooms that the quiet house holds, while Donna expresses her teen daughter Tallie's sadness over losing the one place that holds so many memories. Will stays overnight in the barren house, while Donna drives back to her own home.

The next day, Tallie joins them in sorting through keepsakes, a promise to her mother, but she is unable to connect with the many things that are older than she is and is distracted by texts from her friend, Kathleen. Donna reluctantly agrees to let her go and she leaves to Kathleen on a weekend trip. While disposing of many things into an onsite dumpster, Will comes across letters written by his own father, Will, to his mother, Joy, that expresses, among other things, deep love. Later he falls asleep to records playing soft jazz.

Will's sleep is interrupted by a frantic phone call from Donna. A drunk driver has hit the car the girls were driving in and killed Tallie and another girl, Marie. Donna's husband Patrick picks up Will, and they rush back to console a distraught Donna. Later, Kathleen's parents, Peter and Marge come to console them as well.

Patrick goes to Tallie's room to collect items for her memorial, but only finds a handful of childhood pictures and a trophy. He laments to Will that Tallie's cell phone and computer were destroyed in the crash and they are left with nothing to remember her by or even music to play at her service. Donna comes to her room that night and finds a few pictures and some of Tallie's writings in a composition book.

Will returns to his parents house and continues to sort through his parents' possessions. He shows up at Donna's the next day with a U-Haul of items from their house so Donna will not have to be burdened going through them. Before departing, he hands her a box he retrieved from the dumpster filled with his parents letters and photos.

At a local diner, Patrick and Donna are approached by a recovering Kathleen. She expresses survivors guilt but promises to keep Tallie and her parents in her thoughts. She hands them a key chain with Tallie's name on it, noting it was their ritual to exchange them. She mentions the word "saudade" which Tallie seemed to embrace (and is on a note in her room), "A strong longing for something that isn't the present."

== Cast ==
- Jon Hamm as Will Bleam, Donna's brother
- Nick Offerman as Henry Greer, Helen's son
- Amber Tamblyn as Bethany Ashemore, Ronald's granddaughter
- Patton Oswalt as Peter
- Catherine Keener as Donna Bleam, Will's sister, Patrick's wife and Tallie's mother
- Ellen Burstyn as Helen Greer, Henry's mother
- Bruce Dern as Ronald Ashemore, Bethany's grandfather
- John Ortiz as Daniel Kalman, an insurance agent
- James LeGros as Patrick Bleam, Donna’s husband and Tallie's father
- Jennifer Mudge as Caitlin
- Annalise Basso as Tallie Bleam, Patrick and Donna's daughter and Kathleen's friend
- Joanna Going as Marge
- Arye Gross as Riley O'Bryan
- Mikey Madison as Kathleen, Tallie's friend
- Chris Marquette as Craig
- Suyash Pachauri as OTT
- Lindsey Kraft as Tobey

== Release ==
On January 22, 2017, it was announced that Bleecker Street acquired North American distribution rights at the Sundance Film Festival to the film.

Nostalgia had its world premiere at the Palm Springs International Film Festival on January 6, 2018. It was theatrically released in the United States on February 16, 2018, by Bleecker Street.

== Reception ==
=== Critical response ===
On the review aggregator website Rotten Tomatoes, 38% of 55 critics' reviews are positive, with an average rating of 5.6/10. The website's consensus reads: "Nostalgia combines talented actors and honorable intentions, but poky pacing and a lack of depth make it unlikely the end result will ever inspire the titular emotion." Metacritic, which uses a weighted average, assigned the film a score of 47 out of 100, based on 22 critics, indicating "mixed or average" reviews.

Jeannette Catsoulis of The New York Times wrote, "Nostalgia is the kind of heartfelt wallow that you feel like a heel for attacking. A soggy string of Hallmark moments designed to interrogate the value of the objects we cherish, the movie is front-loaded with major stars and squelching with sentiment." However, Catsoulis praised the cast for their "exceptionally strong performances." Sheri Linden of the Los Angeles Times called the film "a day-old news flash of a drama, delivered in weepy headlines posing as dialogue", and noted that "the actors can't turn the strained stabs at poetry into the affecting meditation that was clearly intended." Michael O'Sullivan of The Washington Post described the film as "a slow, talky and only faintly moving meditation on mortality and memory", and concluded his review by writing, "Moviegoers hoping for something — anything — to take away from Nostalgia (other than a vague feeling of dysphoria, tinged with ennui) will not be similarly compensated."

== Accolades ==
Year	Award	Category	Nominee	Result	Ref.
2018	World Soundtrack Awards	Discovery of the Year	Laurent Eyquem	Nominated	
2018	World Soundtrack Awards	Public Choice Award	Laurent Eyquem	Won	
