= Adam Clark (meteorologist) =

American meteorologist

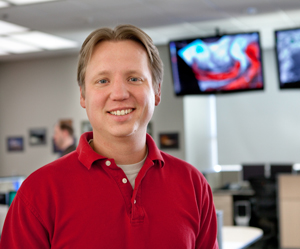
- Education: Iowa State University (B.S., 2004; M.S., 2006; Ph.D., 2009)
- Known for: Numerical modeling of convection
- Awards: Presidential Early Career Award for Scientists and Engineers
- Scientific career
- Fields: Meteorology
- Workplaces: Cooperative Institute for Mesoscale Meteorological Studies / National Severe Storms Laboratory
- Thesis: Predictability Associated with Convection-allowing and Convection-parameterizing Forecasts (2009)
- Doctoral advisor: William A. Gallus

For the American film director see Adam Christian Clark. For the British theologian, see Adam Clarke.

Adam James Clark is an American meteorologist at the Cooperative Institute for Mesoscale Meteorological Studies (CIMMS) and the National Severe Storms Laboratory (NSSL) recognized for contributions to numerical modeling of convection.

Clark earned B.S., M.S., and Ph.D. degrees in meteorology from Iowa State University (ISU) in 2004, 2006, and 2009, respectively. In 2009 he joined NSSL as a National Research Council post-doctoral research associate under David Stensrud and soon became a research scientist at CIMMS/NSSL. He is also an assistant professor at the affiliated University of Oklahoma (OU). On December 23, 2013, Clark was selected by President Barack Obama for the prestigious Presidential Early Career Award for Scientists and Engineers (PECASE), which was awarded at a White House ceremony on April 15, 2014.
