= Happy Endings season 3 =

Happy Endings
- Season 3
- Promotional poster
- No. of episodes: 23

Release
- Original network: ABC
- Original release: October 23, 2012 – May 3, 2013

Season chronology
- ← Previous; Season 2

The third and final season of Happy Endings, an American television series. ABC officially renewed Happy Endings for a third season on May 11, 2012. It was also announced it would move to a new time-slot on Tuesdays at 9:00pm, as a lead-in to Don't Trust the B— in Apartment 23. The season premiered on October 23, 2012. On February 13, 2013, ABC announced that, starting March 29, 2013, the series would move to Fridays at 8:00-9:00 p.m ET/PT with back-to-back original episodes. The series finale aired on May 3, 2013.

ABC's scheduling of Happy Endings's third season was labeled the "Worst TV Strategy" of the 2012-13 television season.

== Cast ==
=== Starring ===
- Eliza Coupe as Jane Kerkovich-Williams
- Elisha Cuthbert as Alex Kerkovich
- Zachary Knighton as Dave Rose
- Adam Pally as Max Blum
- Damon Wayans Jr. as Brad Williams
- Casey Wilson as Penny Hartz

=== Recurring ===
- Nick Zano as Pete (8 episodes)
- Stephen Guarino as Derrick (3 episodes)
- Rob Corddry as Lon "The Car Czar" Sarofsky (3 episodes)
- Mark-Paul Gosselaar as Chase (2 episodes)
- Christopher McDonald as Mr. Kerkovich (2 episodes)
- Julie Hagerty as Mrs. Kerkovich (2 episodes)
- Seth Morris as Scotty (2 episodes)
- Tom Kenny as Tyler Kerkovich (1 episode)
- Brian Austin Green as Chris (1 episode)
- Mary Elizabeth Ellis as Daphne Wilson (1 episode)
- Megan Mullally as Dana Hartz (1 episode)
- Michael McKean as 'Big' Dave Rose (1 episode)

=== Notable guest stars ===
- Rachael Harris as Suzanne ("Sabado Free-Gante")
- Marc Evan Jackson as the Fishmonger ("More Like Stanksgiving")
- Jon Daly as Brody Daniels ("P&P Romance Factory")
- Kulap Vilaysack as Nicole ("To Serb with Love")
- Matt Walsh as Duckie Blenkinship ("KickBall 2: The Kickening")
- Lance Briggs as himself ("KickBall 2: The Kickening")
- David Alan Grier as Terry Chuckles ("In the Heat of the Noche")
- Abby Elliott as Katie ("The Straight Dope")
- RuPaul as Krisjahn ("The Incident")
- Andy Richter as Roy ("Bros Before Bros")
- Stephanie March as Brooke Kerkovich ("Brothas & Sisters")
- James Lesure as Elliot ("Brothas & Sisters")

== Episodes ==
No. overall	No. in season	Title	Directed by	Written by	Original release date	Prod. code	US viewers (millions)
35	1	"Cazsh Dummy Spillionaires"	Fred Goss	David Caspe, Matthew Libman & Daniel Libman	October 21, 2012 (Canada); October 23, 2012 (US)	301	5.57
Dave and Alex start dating again, telling everyone they're keeping it "cazsh." When an unfortunate accident lands Penny in a full body cast, Max nurses her back to health. But after he meets Kent, her hot physical therapist (Matthew Del Negro), he starts "misery-ing" her so her fast recovery won't put the brakes on his new crush; and Brad has a secret about his new unemployed status that he's trying to keep from Jane.
36	2	"Sabado Free-Gante"	Stuart McDonald	Josh Bycel & Jonathan Fener	October 28, 2012 (Canada); October 30, 2012 (US)	302	4.31
Dave and Alex go apartment hunting, but their inability to commit to a place puts their real estate agent (Rachael Harris) to the ultimate test. Meanwhile, Jane takes negotiations to crazy levels when she helps Penny shop for a car; and professional freeloader Max shows a cash-strapped Brad how to spend the perfect Saturday in Chicago with no money at all.
37	3	"Boys II Menorah"	Eric Appel	Dan Rubin & Lon Zimmet	November 11, 2012 (Canada); November 13, 2012 (US)	303	4.36
Max and Brad become "Bar Mitzvah Hype Men", but when Brad accidentally steals Max's thunder, jealousy and tension begins to brew between the two. Meanwhile, Penny finds herself attracting lots of attention from Jewish teens at the Bar Mitzvahs; Dave and Alex try to get their relationship back on track, but things end badly when they take Jane's advice of role playing.
38	4	"More Like Stanksgiving"	Jay Chandrasekhar	Leila Strachan	November 18, 2012 (Canada); November 20, 2012 (US)	304	4.38
The gang celebrates Thanksgiving by watching a previously unaired pilot episode of a Sacramento season of "The Real World" they appeared in back in college -- and, long after the fact, learn some shocking new dirt about one another. Meanwhile, Dave's attempt to give his friends an authentic "Navajo Thanksgiving" ends in disaster.
39	5	"P&P Romance Factory"	Beth McCarthy-Miller	Erik Sommers	December 3, 2012 (Canada); December 4, 2012 (US)	305	3.37
Penny meets a terrific new guy, Pete (Nick Zano), but her frantic attempts to hide that she's wearing a prescription helmet because of her concussion limits their potential romance; Jane tries too hard to break into the "boys club" at her new job at the car dealership; Max and Dave's fist bumping issues bring back painful childhood memories.
40	6	"To Serb with Love"	Victor Nelli Jr.	Jonathan Groff & Brian Gallivan	December 10, 2012 (Canada); December 11, 2012 (US)	306	3.22
With Jane and Alex's parents (Christopher McDonald and Julie Hagerty) planning to celebrate the 20th anniversary of the family mattress business, Jane struggles to find Serbian-themed jokes to make her humorless dad laugh at her toast, while Alex quietly informs Dave that she hasn't told her mom and dad that they're back together. Meanwhile, Max is feeling left out now that Penny is in a stable relationship with Pete. In an attempt to make her jealous and break up with Pete, Max tries to replace Penny with a new BFF (Kulap Vilaysack) with a messy love life. The plan backfires when Penny ruins her relationship with Pete on her own. Feeling guilty, Max helps Penny win back Pete.
41	7	"No-Ho-Ho"	Michael Patrick Jann	Prentice Penny	December 17, 2012 (Canada); December 18, 2012 (US)	307	3.16
The gang is shocked to discover that Jane was born on Christmas Day and has been lying about her birthday this whole time because she hated being overshadowed by the day. So the group makes an extra special effort to throw her a Christmas-free birthday celebration - but will the holiday spirit prove to be too strong to fight? Meanwhile, Max is trying to kick his eggnog addiction and Dave helps Penny pick out the perfect Christmas gift for Pete.
42	8	"Fowl Play/Date"	Rob Greenberg	Sierra Teller Ornelas	January 6, 2013	309	2.40
After Brad and Penny accidentally break Alex's beloved childhood memento, they try to glue it back together before she returns from her "Rom-Com Con" romantic comedy convention. But they go from just being clumsy to "birderers" after Tyler, Alex's racist parrot, keels over and dies from the glue fumes. Can they cover up the crime before Alex returns? Meanwhile, Jane and Dave try a little too hard to find a perfect match for Max.
43	9	"Ordinary Extraordinary Love"	Michael Price	Daniel Chun	January 8, 2013	308	3.66
When a hot young pop star buys a dress at Alex's shop, Penny sees the chance for some favorable publicity, but her efforts backfire in a big way; Jane and Derrick take Max on a tour of Chicago's themed gay bars to help him find his gay identity; Brad and Dave try to be "men" and fix things around the house.
44	10	"KickBall 2: The Kickening"	Gail Lerner	Jackie Clarke & Gil Ozeri	May 17, 2012 (UK); January 13, 2013 (US)	221	2.07
Alex signs everyone up to participate in the Northside Kickball Classic tournament. Max appoints himself as manager and struggles to get his players up to scratch with Dave's history of freezing during games resurfacing, Penny being more interested in trying to meet cute guys, and Jane defecting to another, more winning team.
45	11	"The Ex Factor"	Fred Goss	Leila Strachan	January 14, 2013 (Canada); January 15, 2013 (US)	310	3.05
When Ryan, Jane's ex, comes to town for a visit, Brad is surprised to learn that Ryan (Briga Heelan) is a woman. Meanwhile, Max gets a cool new roommate, Chase (Mark-Paul Gosselaar), who immediately upgrades the apartment with expensive furniture and gadgets. The gang is in awe, but when Chase suddenly disappears, they start snooping into his private life. And Penny attempts to hang out with Pete's "normal" friends.
46	12	"The Marry Prankster"	Rebecca Asher	Jackie Clarke & Gil Ozeri	January 28, 2013 (Canada); January 29, 2013 (US)	311	2.92
After the gang pranks Max into thinking he won a big lotto jackpot, he vows revenge when they least suspect it. Everyone dreads what might happen next; Alex decides to cut a deal with Max to avoid payback. And Max's plotting gets in the way of the big event Penny's been waiting for, a proposal from Pete. Meanwhile, Brad gets a new job as a CFO, but Jane is not amused when she learns the job title is "Chief Fun Officer" and that Brad is working at a gym for kids.
47	13	"Our Best Friend's Wedding"	Rob Greenberg	Hilary Winston	January 29, 2013	312	2.85
When newly-engaged Penny learns that Pete wants to elope instead of having a wedding, would-be wedding planner Jane takes the lovebirds and the rest of the gang to a wedding expo in hopes that Pete will change his mind. Meanwhile, Max and Brad are stuck with a "couples pass" and end up in the gay wedding part of the expo, and Alex and Dave are forced to deal with their own unresolved wedding issues.
48	14	"In the Heat of the Noche"	Josh Bycel	Matthew Libman & Daniel Libman	March 29, 2013	313	2.97
Brad's boss (David Alan Grier) tells him that the children's gym, "Chuckles and Huggs", may close. Inspired by his 23rd favorite movie, Sister Act 2: Back in the Habit, Brad enlists the help of the gang who drive up business and attendance. To help with their habit of constantly texting the men in their lives, and thus "giving up the power", Penny and Max start drinking NocheTussin, a black market cough medicine from South America. The medicine put them to sleep and prevents them from texting, but their tolerance to the cough syrup becomes a problem when they can no longer sleep more than a few hours. Alex winds up using the kids from the gym in a sweatshop to produce custom jewellery.
49	15	"The Straight Dope"	Steven Sprung	Lon Zimmet & Dan Rubin	March 29, 2013	315	2.29
Max pretends to be straight and begins dating a cute girl named Katie (Abby Elliott), after finding out she has access to Chicago Bulls season tickets. Penny and Brad think what Max is doing is terrible and that Katie deserves to know the truth and attempt to out him in front of Katie. Meanwhile, Alex is tired of being seen as the "dimwitted blonde" by the gang, so she becomes well read to prove them wrong. However, her newfound knowledge completely throws off the group dynamic and nobody likes it.
50	16	"The Incident"	Ken Whittingham	Erik Sommers	April 5, 2013	314	3.28
Max starts going to Alex and Jane's hairdresser, Krisjahn (RuPaul) to get gossip on them, but Max's inability to keep the gossip to himself starts a war between the Kerkovich sisters; after Penny accidentally loses Dave's "Steak Me Home" truck, she helps him find who stole it.
51	17	"Bros Before Bros"	Eric Appel	Jason Berger	April 5, 2013	316	2.69
Alex urges Penny to invite her estranged father, Roy (Andy Richter) to come to the wedding. Jane is skeptical but warms up to Roy later on after he buys Penny the wedding dress she has been eyeing for weeks. Penny asks Roy to walk her down the aisle, but when Roy won't stop trying to offer to pay for wedding expenses, she becomes angry with him, getting into an argument which ends with them deciding that he shouldn't attend. Dave asks for help from Brad and Max to sabotage a rival food truck. During an operation to have the rival food truck's meat supply swapped with offal, Max runs into and falls for the rival owner's son. A food fight breaks out between the two food trucks on game day and in the chaos Roy jumps in front of a tomato about to hit Penny. Though still not wanting him to walk her down the aisle she would still like Roy to be there.
52	18	"She Got Game Night"	Kyle Newacheck	Brian Gallivan	April 12, 2013	317	2.73
Penny starts having doubts about her engagement to Pete, unsure if they're really right for each other and if she really knows him well enough after four months. Jane and Penny decide the best way to find out is to have a couples games night between them, with Max tagging along and inviting Scotty (Seth Morris) as his teammate. The competitiveness gets out of hand when Penny draws Jane's ire after claiming that she and Pete know each other better after four months than Jane and Brad do after 10 years, with Jane being particularly angry at Brad after they come in last place. The aftermath of the game prompts Penny to make an unexpected decision - she breaks off her engagement with Pete after realizing she doesn't have what Jane and Brad have and can't see herself with him decades from now. Elsewhere, Dave looks for a new psychic to help him choose between taking a job at a restaurant or to stay with his food truck business. Alex tries to show Dave that he only wanted someone to tell him what he already wanted to do, which is stay with the food truck.
53	19	"The Storm Before the Calm"	Kyle Newacheck	Prentice Penny	April 12, 2013	318	2.08
Penny writes a musical entitled "Black Plague: A Love Story" with a lead character named Clete who has his heart ripped out by the black plague. Penny insists that it's not autobiographical and that she's handling the break up with Pete fine. Penny asks her friend Derrick to stage the play at a local theater. Brad is cast in the lead role with Dave working the lighting and audio equipment. When Penny makes a few last minute changes to the musical and staging they quit, but the show goes on with Derrick in the role of Clete. Meanwhile, a guerilla marketer recruits Alex and Max to be tastemakers and the pair lock out Jane from joining. After a few days, Jane finally gets to sit down and ask about their products, but realises the pair have been scammed.
54	20	"The Ballad of Lon Sarofsky"	Fred Goss	Jackie Clarke & Gil Ozeri	April 19, 2013 (Canada); April 26, 2013 (US)	319	2.19
With Penny temporarily living with Brad and Jane, they attempt to set up a dinner date for Penny and a new guy she's into, to help her rebound from her break-up with Pete. The date night backfires after Brad accidentally ends up inviting Jane's crude boss, The Car Czar (Rob Corddry), who Penny ends up hooking up with instead. Brad and Jane are disgusted when they find out and end up acting like disapproving parents toward Penny. Meanwhile, Max enters the "Mr. Super Gay Chicago" pageant to make some money, and has help from Alex and Dave as his coaches.
55	21	"Un-sabotagable"	Tristram Shapeero	Jonathan Fener	April 26, 2013	320	1.73
Chase (Mark-Paul Gosselaar) returns to get revenge, but declares Max's life as so pathetic it's "un-sabotagable." Jane helps Max improve his life in order to prove Chase wrong. Despite succeeding, Max's paranoia returns his life to its previous pathetic state. Dave challenges Alex to use her stockpile of Groupons to curb her impulsiveness and stop her from purchasing a Groupon for swimming with dolphins. Dave is deathly afraid of dolphins and sabotages one of Alex's Groupons for a boot camp in order to have the challenge unfulfilled. Brad and Penny are dragged into the challenge - one willingly, the other less so.
56	22	"Deuce Babylove 2: Electric Babydeuce"	David Caspe	Matthew Libman & Daniel Libman	May 3, 2013	321	2.68
Penny and Dave's parents, Dana (Megan Mullally) and Big Dave (Michael McKean) announce that they're going to adopt a baby together. Penny and Dave hold a fake casting call for babies in order to steal one and deter their parents from adopting. Brad and Jane want more couples time alone away from the rest of the group and enroll in a country club. Max and Alex, afraid of being left out, also look into enrolling. When the couples challenge each other to a tennis match, Max and Alex lose. As Brad and Jane gloat and smash tennis rackets in victory, the rest of the country club looks on disapprovingly and stop their enrollment.
57	23	"Brothas & Sisters"	Rebecca Asher	Josh Bycel & Leila Strachan	May 3, 2013	322	2.17
Jane and Alex's big sister, Brooke (Stephanie March), is getting married and Jane has the task of organizing the wedding and reception. Brad is put off by the fact that Brooke's fiancé, Elliot (James Lesure) is black, who Brad feels will have an easier time with the Kerkovich after he himself was the first black person introduced to the family. After a series of planning disagreements, Brooke demotes Jane from wedding planner to standing near a sign-in book. Alex and Dave have broken up but haven't told anyone. They end up telling Penny and Max who in turn, in order to stop themselves from gossiping about the break-up, create other rumors to spread disinformation.

== Production ==
ABC officially renewed Happy Endings for a third season on May 11, 2012. It was also announced it would move to a new time-slot on Tuesdays at 9:00pm, as a lead-in to Don't Trust the B— in Apartment 23. It premiered on October 23, 2012.

The first six episodes of the season aired in Canada on City, two days prior to the American broadcasts airing on ABC. KickBall 2: The Kickening, an episode from season two that previously did not air on ABC, made its debut as part of the third season on ABC and City on January 13, 2013, despite having aired internationally as part of season two.

On December 4, 2012, ABC announced that on Tuesday, March 26, 2013, Dancing with the Stars would retake the Tuesday 9PM hour, leaving the fate of unaired episodes unclear. On December 21, 2012, ABC announced that new episodes of both Happy Endings and Don't Trust the B— in Apartment 23 will replace the cancelled drama 666 Park Avenue for three weeks on January 6, January 13, and January 20 while maintaining its current timeslot. Only 2 of the 3 scheduled episodes aired on the Sunday timeslot.

On January 22, 2013, ABC announced that it has removed Don't Trust the B— in Apartment 23 from the schedule and would instead air back-to-back Happy Endings concurrently on Tuesdays, but it was removed from the timeslot after episodes 12 and 13 aired. However, on February 13, 2013, ABC announced that, starting March 29, the series would move to Fridays at 8:00-9:00 p.m ET/PT with back-to-back original episodes.

On April 19, 2013, ABC preempted its primetime programming in favor of covering the Boston manhunt, after the Boston Marathon bombing, pushing back the season finale date to May 3, 2013.

== Reception ==
=== Critical reception ===
The third season of Happy Endings continued the series' critical acclaim. In regards to the premiere, David Sims of The A.V. Club stated "In a TV landscape increasingly dotted with low-concept ensemble comedies that are trying to be all whip-smart and funny, it's nice to have "Happy Endings" back to put 'em all in their place." Verne Gay of Newsday said that "Happy Endings", cast and all, has now officially jelled. The show exists on the same cosmic (and comic) TV plane as "Scrubs," "Arrested Development" and that other late bloomer, "Cougar Town." Maureen Ryan of The Huffington Post stated that "Happy Endings" has so many things going for it that the occasional weak story line or meh scene is not a big deal at all. It's one of the sharpest and warm-hearted comedies on the air, and I enjoy it a lot more than "Modern Family..." Clay Sublett of Splitsider said, "If ABC is willing to give them a chance, Happy Endings can come back in season four and fill the hole 30 Rock will leave in our hearts."

At the end of the third season, with the show facing possible cancellation due to low ratings, Rolling Stone declared that the show was "the most underrated, under-watched series on TV, that may also be the funniest" and went on to say, "Despite flying under the radar, Happy Endings has stayed afloat for three seasons by earning both critical acclaim and a devote fan following. Blending comedic elements of Friends, Arrested Development, and 30 Rock, it manages to serve up something new and refreshing by being both consumed by and annoyed with the frenetic world we live in. It's biting, but easy to swallow – social commentary at its best."

=== U.S. Ratings ===
#	Episode	Original air date	Timeslot (EST)	Viewers (millions)	Ratings share (Adults 18-49)	DVR 18–49	Total 18–49	Ref
1	"Cazsh Dummy Spillionaires"	October 23, 2012	Tuesday 9:00PM	5.57	1.8/5	—N/a	—N/a	—N/a
2	"Sabado Free-Gante"	October 30, 2012	Tuesday 9:00PM	4.31	1.4/3	0.5	1.8	
3	"Boys II Menorah"	November 13, 2012	Tuesday 9:00PM	4.36	1.3/4	—N/a	—N/a	—N/a
4	"More Like Stanksgiving"	November 20, 2012	Tuesday 9:00PM	4.38	1.1/3	—N/a	—N/a	—N/a
5	"P & P Romance Factory"	December 4, 2012	Tuesday 9:00PM	3.37	1.3/3	0.5	1.8	
6	"To Serb with Love"	December 11, 2012	Tuesday 9:00PM	3.22	1.2/3	0.6	1.8	
7	"No-Ho-Ho"	December 18, 2012	Tuesday 9:00PM	3.16	1.3/4	0.5	1.8	
8	"Fowl Play/Date"	January 6, 2013	Sunday 10:00PM	2.40	1.0/3	—N/a	—N/a	—N/a
9	"Ordinary Extraordinary Love"	January 8, 2013	Tuesday 9:00PM	3.66	1.4/4	0.6	2.0	
10	"KickBall 2: The Kickening"	January 13, 2013	Sunday 10:00PM	2.07	0.9/2	—N/a	—N/a	—N/a
11	"The Ex Factor"	January 15, 2013	Tuesday 9:00PM	3.05	1.3/3	—N/a	—N/a	—N/a
12	"The Marry Prankster"	January 29, 2013	Tuesday 9:00PM	2.92	1.2/3	0.6	1.8	
13	"Our Best Friend's Wedding"	January 29, 2013	Tuesday 9:30PM	2.86	1.3/3	—N/a	—N/a	—N/a
14	In the Heat of the Noche	March 29, 2013	Friday 8:00PM	2.97	0.9/3	0.6	1.5	
15	The Straight Dope	March 29, 2013	Friday 8:30PM	2.29	0.7/3	0.6	1.3	
16	The Incident	April 5, 2013	Friday 8:00PM	3.28	1.1/4	—N/a	—N/a	—N/a
17	Bros Before Bros	April 5, 2013	Friday 8:30PM	2.69	1.0/4	—N/a	—N/a	—N/a
18	She Got Game Night	April 12, 2013	Friday 8:00PM	2.73	0.8/3	0.4	1.2	
19	The Storm Before the Calm	April 12, 2013	Friday 8:30PM	2.08	0.7/2	0.4	1.1	
20	The Ballad of Lon Sarofsky	April 26, 2013	Friday 8:00PM	2.19	0.6/2	—N/a	—N/a	—N/a
21	Un-sabotagable	April 26, 2013	Friday 8:30PM	1.73	0.6/2	—N/a	—N/a	—N/a
22	Deuce Babylove 2: Electric Babydeuce	May 3, 2013	Friday 8:00PM	2.68	0.8/3	0.4	1.2	
23	Brothas & Sisters	May 3, 2013	Friday 8:30PM	2.17	0.7/2	—N/a	—N/a	—N/a

== Home media ==
Unlike the first two seasons of the show, the third season was released exclusively through Amazon's manufacture-on-demand program – where the content is custom burned onto DVD-R discs to fulfill orders sold directly to the consumer – rather than using the traditional business model of pressing batches of discs that ship to "brick and mortar" retailers. As is standard with MOD releases, the release contains no special features.

Happy Endings: The Complete Third Season
Set details
23 episodes; 3-disc set; 1.85:1 aspect ratio
Release dates
Region 1	Region 2	Region 4
October 1, 2013 (manufactured-on-demand release)	TBA	TBA
Blu-ray release dates
Region A	Region B	Region C
August 7, 2018 (Complete Series Release)	TBA	TBA
