= Game (2017 film) =

2017 American short film

- Directed by: Jeannie Donohoe
- Written by: Jeannie Donohoe
- Produced by: Joey Horvitz
- Starring: Rick Fox; Nicole Chanel Williams; Tye White
- Edited by: Saira Haider
- Music by: Deron Johnson
- Production companies: Divide/Conquer; Lexus Short Films
- Distributed by: The Weinstein Company
- Release date: May 3, 2017
- Running time: 15 minutes
- Country: United States
- Language: English

Game is a 2017 American sports drama short film written and directed by Jeannie Donohoe and produced by Joey Horvitz.

== Plot ==
A.J. Green, a newcomer to town, arrives at the local high school boys' basketball varsity tryouts. Her exceptional skills immediately catch the eyes of the coach and fellow players, especially Collins, a three-time point guard MVP. However, as the days progress, Collins reveals signs of egotism and jealousy, manifesting in petty acts such as making A.J. wait to drink at the water fountain and sticking gum on the faucet.

A revelation unfolds when A.J. joins her father in his car after tryouts – she is a girl concealing her gender from the entire tryout team. Undeterred, A.J. dedicates herself to rigorous training on an empty outdoor basketball court late into the night, continuing even when the court lights shut off.

In the next training session, Collins showcases his offensive prowess in a one-on-one. A.J. responds in kind, prompting the coach to pit her against Collins. A jaw-dropping moment occurs as A.J. steals the ball from Collins, only for him to retaliate with unsportsmanlike conduct, irritating the coach and setting the stage for tensions within the team.

During the final training day, a typical five-on-five basketball game is organized with the roster. A.J. and Collins find themselves on opposite sides. Driven by egotism, Collins hogs the ball, while A.J. exhibits exceptional teamwork, stealing the ball from him once again. The coach, seeking to challenge the status quo, places A.J. at point guard in Collins' team, infuriating him. Despite initial struggles, A.J. adapts to the position and leads her team to victory.

Post-game, the coach announces the impending roster reveal, leading the team to the men's locker room. In a pivotal moment, a confrontation erupts between A.J. and Collins when he steals her gym bag. As he empties her bag, A.J.'s sports bra falls into Collins' hand. Surprised, he attempts to lift her shirt, creating a scuffle. The coach intervenes, and A.J. is forced to reveal her true identity and name, "Anastasia". He reproaches her actions and tells her that he will contact the girl's coach. In a defiant moment, A.J. expresses her determination to prove herself by questioning the coach about his knowledge of WNBA players, but he remains silent in response.

The roster call becomes a nerve-wracking moment as names are announced, with A.J. anticipating rejection. However, to everyone's surprise, the coach calls her name, emphasizing a promising journey ahead for the team.

== Themes ==
The film Game follows the theme of gender inequality. This is displayed with A.J.'s going out of her way to hide her gender to make it in the men's basketball team, knowing it would increase her chances of success and recognition.

== Production ==
=== Development ===
Writer and director Jeannie Donohoe said she came up with the initial idea for the Game through her desire to delve into the concept of gender constraint and possibilities, however through an entertaining sports film. Her goal was to captivate audiences with the premise of a sports-themed movie while subtly revealing its deeper commentary on gender inequality in the sporting world. Donohoe mentions as well that she was inspired by a moment in her childhood when she experienced gender inequality. It happened when she and a friend were mistakenly hired by the circus organizers who assumed they were boys due to their short haircuts. When it was revealed that Donohoe and her friend were girls, they were sent home and replaced with boys.

=== Filming ===
The film was made on a 4-month timeline. It started in the summer of 2016 and had a short pre-production. It then had a 5-day shoot in August and a post-production that lasted until its premiere in the fall.

=== Cast ===
- Rick Fox as Coach
- Nicole Chanel Williams as A.J. Green
- Tye White Collins
- Jamie McShane as Assistant Coach
- Charles Parnell as AJ's Father
- Dominique Columbus as Theo
- Michael Purdie as Luke

== Awards ==
The film received many accolades, receiving many different awards across 250 film festivals.

The most notable are:

- Bronze Lion for Cinema & Theatrical Fiction at the Cannes Lions International Festival of Creativity in June 2017.
- Audience Awards (age 12-17 & Grown Ups) & Grand Prize at the New York International Children's Film Festival.
- Best of Fest Audience Favorites at Palm Springs International ShortFest.
- Best Short at the Julien Dubuque International Film Festival.
- The Special Jury Award: Narrative Short at the San Luis Obispo International Film Festival.
- The Audience Choice Award at the Los Angeles Indie Film Festival.
- Best Live Action Narrative at Tokyo Lift-Off Film Festival.
