= Lindsey Kraft =

American actress, model and writer (born 1983)

- Born: Lindsey Brooke Kraft; January 23, 1983 (age 43); Manhasset, New York, U.S.
- Education: University of Maryland
- Occupations: Actress, model, writer, musician
- Years active: 2003–present

Lindsey Brooke Kraft (born January 23, 1983) is an American actress, model, writer and musician. She is best known for playing Marguerite Macaw on Getting On, Leslie Curry on Living Biblically, and Allison on Grace and Frankie.

Kraft has also appeared in films such as Epic Movie (2007), Nostalgia (2018), and A Futile and Stupid Gesture (2018).

Kraft is also a singer, songwriter, and pianist, and is currently writing a musical titled Love, Me. In Fall 2023, Kraft opened for Ben Folds on his What Matters Most tour, playing songs from Love, Me.

== Early life ==
Kraft was born in Manhasset, New York, on January 23, 1983, and grew up on Long Island, New York. She is a graduate of the University of Maryland.

== Filmography ==
=== Film ===
Year	Title	Role	Notes
2006	Nail Polish	Sorority girl	
2007	Epic Movie	Rogue	
2008	The Accidental Husband	Lauren	
2010	Nonames	Steph	
2010	See You in September	Dagney	
2012	The Babymakers	Greta	
2017	Newly Single	Jackie	
2018	Nostalgia	Tobey	
2018	A Futile and Stupid Gesture	Gwyneth Cravens	

=== Television ===
Year	Title	Role	Notes
2003, 2011	Law & Order: Special Victims Unit	Courtney / Lisette	2 episodes
2005	Law & Order: Trial by Jury	Ms. Prokolsky	Episode: "Pattern of Conduct"
2005	Third Watch	Penelope	3 episodes
2006	The Sopranos	Nadia	Episode: "Johnny Cakes"
2006	Without a Trace	Amy Jenson	Episode: "Watch Over Me"
2009	Southland	Daisy Milliard	2 episodes
2010	Lie to Me	Connie	Episode: "The Canary's Song"
2010	Rex Is Not Your Lawyer	Sophia Kraft	Episode: "Pilot"
2010–2011	Backwash	Phoebe / Pheobe	5 episodes
2011	Tagged	Susan Cromwell	TV movie
2012	Happy Endings	Lindsay	Episode: "The St. Valentine's Day Maxssacre"
2012	Desperate Housewives	Jennifer	Episode: "Finishing the Hat"
2012	Dating Rules from My Future Self	Tara Reed	5 episodes
2012	The Newsroom	Alexandra	Episode: "The Blackout, Part 2: Mock Debate"
2012	Sketchy		Episode: "Got the Check"
2012–2013	The Mob Doctor	Casey Lambert	2 episodes
2013	Guys with Kids	Jess	Episode: "Marny's Dad"
2013	Men at Work	Morgan	Episode: "Weekend at PJ's"
2013	Burning Love	Rebecca	Episode: "Photo Shoot"
2013	Brenda Forever	Jenny	TV movie
2013–2015	Getting On	Marguerite Macaw	14 episodes
2014	Kirstie	Melissa Winters	Episode: "The Dinner Party"
2014	Grey's Anatomy	Lisa Campbell	Episode: "You've Got to Hide Your Love Away"
2014	2 Broke Girls	Monica	Episode: "And the Kilt Trip"
2014	Mixology	Gabby	Episode: "Cal & Kacey"
2014	Veep	Cassie Langley	Episode: "Clovis"
2014	Franklin & Bash	Mikah Rowe	Episode: "Red or Black"
2015	Chasing Life	Shawna	Episode: "Rest in Peace"
2015	Workaholics	Jasmine	Episode: "Blood Drive"
2015	Backstrom	Claire McGrail	Episode: "Love Is a Rose and You Better Not Pick It"
2015	NCIS	Sarah Goode	2 episodes
2015	Wayward Pines	Darla	Episode: "Do Not Discuss Your Life Before"
2015	Bones	Leelah Strawn	Episode: "The Next in the Last"
2015	Childrens Hospital	Esther	Episode: "Home Life of a Doctor"
2015	Suits	Alyssa Lang	Episode: "Toe to Toe"
2016	Noches con Platanito	Herself	
2016	Lethal Weapon	Sarah McFadden	Episode: "Can I Get a Witness?"
2016	Dream Team	Michaela	TV movie
2016–2018	The Ranch	Dr. Boyd	2 episodes
2017–2022	Grace and Frankie	Allison Giampietro-Smikowitz	Recurring
2017	Modern Family	Joey	Episode: "All Things Being Equal"
2018	Nobodies	Michelle	Episode: "Open Dorf Policy"
2018	Living Biblically	Leslie Curry	Main cast
2018	The Conners	Mrs. Reynolds	Episode: "Tangled Up in Blue"
2018–2019	Dirty John	Ruth	2 episodes
2019	The Big Bang Theory	Marissa Johnson	2 episodes
2019	Fam	Molly	Episode: "This Is Fam"
2019–2021	Why Women Kill	Claire	5 episodes
2020	The Good Doctor	Ellie Lewis	Episode: "Fault"
2021	Them	Midge Pruitt	Episodes: "Day 1" and "Day 3"
2021	The Shrink Next Door	Deborah	Episode: "The Consultation"
2021	Fantasy Island	Allison Holmes	2 episodes
2022	Mythic Quest	Sarah	Episode: "Sarian"
2023	Obliterated	Yani	4 episodes
