= Jeannie Donohoe =

American director and writer

Jeannie Donohoe is an American director and writer who has written and directed short films.

== Career ==
Donohoe attended Dartmouth College as an undergraduate student and earned a B.A. degree. Later she attended Lehman College and earned a Master in Education. Donohoe would then enroll in the Teach for America program and teach middle school in the South Bronx for four years. She became interested in filmmaking from watching movies in her spare time and decided to join the film program at Columbia University where she would earn an M.F.A. in screenwriting and directing.

During her time at Columbia, Donohoe made two thesis short films: Public (2010) and Lambing Season (2013). Public explores the relationship between a teacher and his student, which she took inspiration from her time as a teacher. It marked her debut as a writer and a director and was the first movie she publicized and displayed in festivals, including the Palm Springs International ShortFest. Lambing Season follows a woman tracking down her father in rural Ireland. Donohoe submitted the movie to the Lexus Short Films competition in 2015 where she made it into the second round and was given the theme of "anticipation" to create a film on. With that, she wrote and directed her next short film, Game (2017), which follows a teenager trying to enroll in his local high school's basketball team while hiding a secret from them. The film played in 250 different film festivals and won two Oscar-qualifying awards at Raindance and New York International Children’s Film Festival and a Bronze Lion for Cinema & Theatrical Fiction at the Cannes Lions. She currently serves as a screenwriting instructor at Columbia University.

== Filmography ==
- Public
- Lambing Season
- Game
