= Adam Christian Clark =

American film director

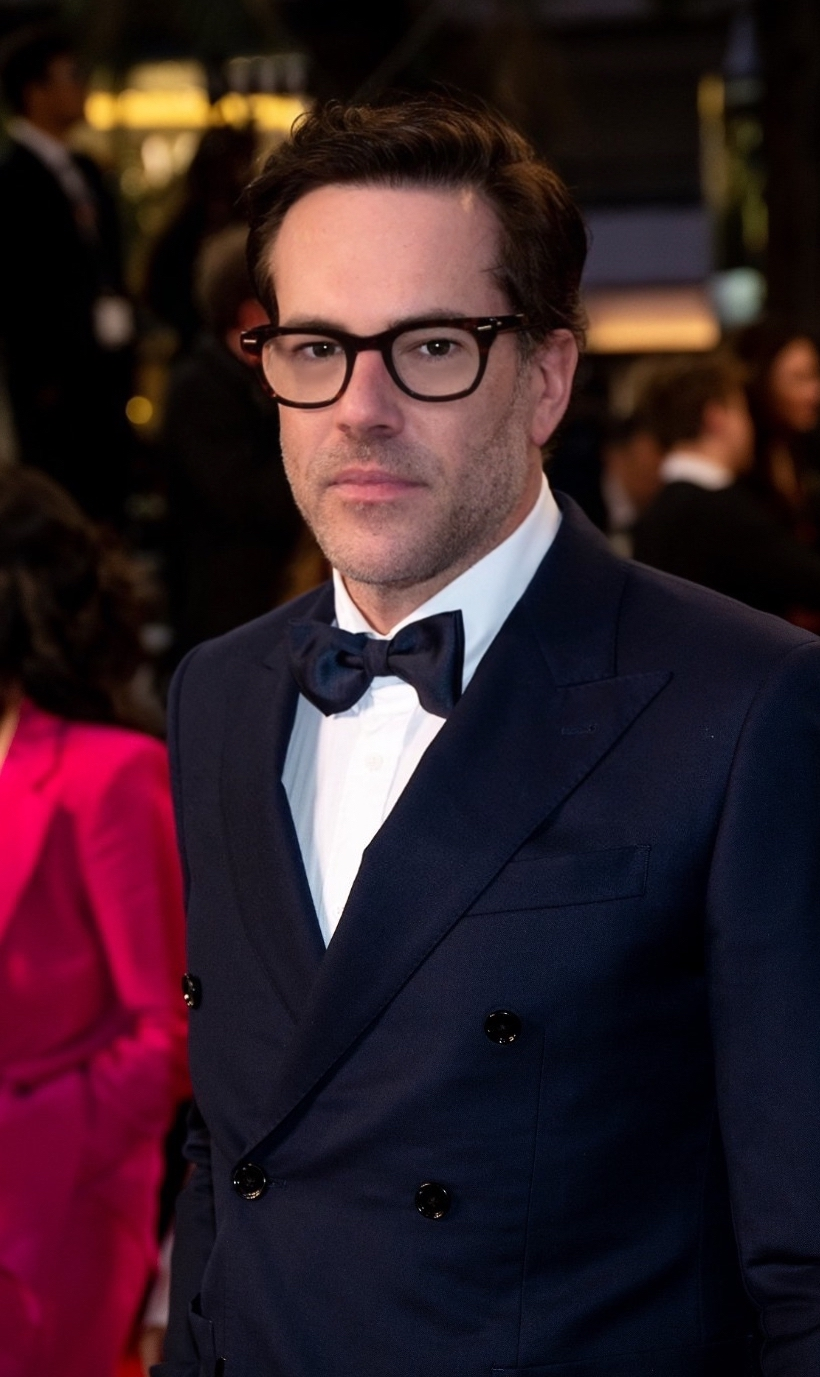
- Clark at the 2023 Cannes Film Festival
- Born: December 20, 1980 (age 45)
- Education: USC School of Cinematic Arts
- Occupations: Film director, screenwriter, editor
- Years active: 2002–present

Adam Christian Clark (born 1980) is a Greek-American film director, screenwriter, editor, and actor whose films have been noted for their naturalistic dialogue and style.

== Career ==
=== Early career ===
Clark attended the University of Southern California School of Cinematic Arts. While still a student, he worked as a director on the CBS network television series Big Brother. He then worked as a roster director at Quentin Tarantino and Lawrence Bender's production company A Band Apart, where he wrote and directed television, music videos, and commercials. Clark has worked with such artists as Kanye West, Jackie Chan, Gnarls Barkley, Lupe Fiasco, and Girl Talk.

Clark spent 2006 in Shanghai, writing and directing Mainland China's first reality television series. In 2008, Clark collaborated on two projects with author Charlie LeDuff: The Editor, a short film starring Richard Riehle based on LeDuff's career at The New York Times, and Bag Men, a feature screenplay written for Plan B Entertainment. In 2009, Clark returned to China to shoot Goodbye Shanghai, a short film he also wrote about Western spies working as international bankers in Shanghai. The film received several national and international festival awards.

=== 2010s ===
==== Caroline and Jackie ====
Clark's first feature film Caroline and Jackie premiered at the 2012 Tribeca Film Festival, and was met with positive reviews. John Anderson of Variety said, "Displaying nerves of steel and a generous heart, helmer Adam Christian Clark takes a lot of chances with Caroline and Jackie, a tale of troubled sisters that keeps the viewer off balance throughout before delivering a payoff that serves as both catharsis and absolution. While it does make demands of its audience, the cumulative emotional impact is startling". The film was theatrically released by Phase 4 Films in 2013.

==== Newly Single ====
Clark's second feature film Newly Single, premiered in the main competition of the 2017 edition of PÖFF, and was Clark's first time acting in a feature film. The New York Times described the film as a dark comedy “probing the sexual and professional misadventures of a struggling filmmaker.” The film was released in 2018 by Gravitas Ventures and, as of 2024, holds an 88% "Fresh" rating from the review aggregator website Rotten Tomatoes.

=== 2020s ===
==== Diary of a Spy ====
Clark's third feature film Diary of a Spy was released by XYZ Films in mid 2022. Diary of a Spy marks Clark's first foray into a genre space with mixed reviews. As of 2024, the film has a 57% "Rotten" rating from Rotten Tomatoes. Josh Bell from Crooked Marquee commented, "Clark seems determined to drain all possible suspense and excitement from the spy genre," while Shelagh Rowan-Legg wrote for Screen Anarchy, "Diary of a Spy takes us into this dark, dangerous world via an often neglected side door, probing this story with observations on human vulnerability and the price of exploiting it."

=== Influences ===
While an undergraduate film student at USC, Clark became close friends with his professor, cinematographer William A. Fraker. Clark accredits Fraker as an influence for hard lighting and formalistic production design.

Clark has attributed strong influence to the American New Wave film movement, and directors John Cassavetes, and Robert Altman.

=== Themes and style ===
Clark's films are very character driven, and often explore themes centered around family, isolation, and modern dating.

When asked to describe his style in a 2012 interview with IndieWire, Clark stated, "Stylistically my number one goal at all stages of production is for the narrative to always maintain the highest level of reality possible. My hope would be that the camera, the lighting, the sound, the performances, and my own ego will go as unnoticed as possible, and that you may feel, if just for a moment, that you are watching your own family interact."

== Filmography ==
=== Feature films ===
- Caroline and Jackie (2013)
- Newly Single (2018)
- Diary of a Spy (2022)

=== Short films ===
- The Editor: a man i despise. (2008)
- Goodbye Shanghai (2010)
